= Cheshire RFU Cup =

Cheshire Cup
- Sport: Rugby Union
- Instituted: 1877; 149 years ago
- Number of teams: 8
- Country: England
- Holders: Caldy (6th title) (2016–17)
- Most titles: Sale (17 titles)
- Website: Cheshire RFU

The Cheshire Cup is an annual rugby union knock-out club competition organized by the Cheshire Rugby Football Union. It was first introduced in the 1877–78 season as the Cheshire Challenge County Cup and the inaugural competition was won by Birkenhead Park, who along with eight other local sides including New Brighton and Sale, made up the club members of the Cheshire RFU at that time. Four years later the cup was discontinued due to arguments over whether cup ties were beneficial to the county game. The Cheshire RFU reintroduced the cup during the 1969–70 season, with Sale the first winners of the competition in over 80 years.

The Cheshire Cup is currently the premier county cup competition for club sides in tier 4 (National League 2 North) and tier 5 (National League 3 North or National League 3 Midlands) of the English rugby union system that are based in either Cheshire, Merseyside or the Isle of Man. Originally it was the only men's county cup competition but plate, shield and bowl competitions have been introduced over the years for lower ranked clubs. The current format is as a knock-out cup with a quarter-final, semi-final and final which is held at a neutral venue during the latter stages of the season (March–May). At present Cheshire Cup finals are held on the same date and at the same venue as Cheshire Plate finals.

== Cheshire Cup winners ==
Cheshire Cup Finals
Season	Winner	Score	Runners–up	Venue
1877-78	Birkenhead Park		Bowdon & Lymm	Manchester
1878-79	Birkenhead Park		New Brighton	St Anthony's Road, Blundellsands
1879-80	New Brighton		Birkenhead	Rock Ferry
1880-81	Birkenhead Park		New Brighton	Liverpool
1881-1968	No competition for 88 years			
1969-70	Sale		Old Salians	Heywood Road, Sale
1970-71	Caldy		Lymm	Hare Lane, Chester
1971-72	Wilmslow		Birkenhead Park	Hare Lane, Chester
1972-73	Sale		Wilmslow	
1973-74	Sale		Wilmslow	
1974-75	Sale		Wilmslow	
1975-76	Sale		Birkenhead Park	
1976-77	Sale		Wilmslow	
1977-78	Sale		Birkenhead Park	
1978-79	Sale		New Brighton	Heywood Road, Sale
1979-80	Sale		Lymm	
1980-81	Sale		Birkenhead Park	
1981-82	Sale	32-9	Lymm	Memorial Ground, Wilmslow
1982-83	Sale	29-13	Alsager College	Memorial Ground, Wilmslow
1983-84	Sale	40-3	Birkenhead Park	Heywood Road, Sale
1984-85	Sale	31-0	Lymm	Heywood Road, Sale
1985-86	Sale		Birkenhead Park	
1986-87	Sale		Birkenhead Park	Heywood Road, Sale
1987-88	Winnington Park		Birkenhead Park	Hare Lane, Chester
1988-89	Lymm		Mid Cheshire College	Memorial Ground, Wilmslow
1989-90	Winnington Park	10-6	Lymm	Memorial Ground, Wilmslow
1990-91	Winnington Park		Chester	Heywood Road, Sale
1991-92	Macclesfield	21-4	Sale	Memorial Ground, Wilmslow
1992-93	Winnington Park		New Brighton	Hare Lane, Chester
1993-94	Winnington Park		New Brighton	Hare Lane, Chester
1994-95	Macclesfield		Winnington Park	Hare Lane, Chester
1995-96	New Brighton	19-16	Winnington Park	Hare Lane, Chester
1996-97	Sale	48-10	Chester	Crouchley Lane, Lymm
1997-98	New Brighton		Winnington Park	Hare Lane, Chester
1998-99	New Brighton		Chester	Upper Park, Birkenhead
1999-00	New Brighton	24-20	Chester	Crouchley Lane, Lymm
2000-01	New Brighton	27-11	Winnington Park	Hare Lane, Chester
2001-02	Macclesfield	33-27	Birkenhead	Hare Lane, Chester
2002-03	Macclesfield	28-25	Chester	The Memorial Ground, Stockport
2003-04	Chester	20-13	Wirral	Paton Field, Thurstaston
2004-05	New Brighton	25-18	Macclesfield	Memorial Ground, Clatterbridge
2005-06	Macclesfield	36-26 (Note: Game went into extra time after being tied 26-26 in regular time.)	Chester	Heywood Road, Sale
2006-07	Macclesfield	35-23	New Brighton	Heywood Road, Sale
2007-08	Birkenhead Park	22-20	Macclesfield	Hare Lane, Chester
2008-09	Macclesfield	18-14	Birkenhead Park	Burrows Hill, Winnington
2009-10	Sale Jets	34-13	Lymm	Crouchley Lane, Lymm
2010-11	Final was cancelled due to fixture congestion caused by league games – the finalists, Caldy and Sale Jets, shared the title.			
2011-12	Caldy	28-0	Northwich	Crouchley Lane, Lymm
2012-13	Caldy	40-24	Birkenhead Park	Hartsfield, Moreton
2013-14	Sale FC	26-21	Caldy	Crouchley Lane, Lymm
2014-15	Caldy	28-18	Sale FC	Upper Park, Birkenhead
2015-16	Macclesfield	49-26	Caldy	Bradwell Road, Sandbach
2016-17	Caldy	35-19	Sandbach	Memorial Ground, Clatterbridge
2017-18	Final was cancelled as the finalists, Caldy and Sale FC could not meet due to league fixture congestion caused by bad weather.			
2018-19	Sale FC	34-24	Chester	Burrows Hill, Winnington

== Number of wins ==
- Sale (17) (Note: If you count both the Sale FC (amateur) and Sale Jets (Sharks second team) victories in the competition, then Sale actually have won the Cheshire Cup 20 times.)
- Macclesfield (8)
- New Brighton (7)
- Caldy (6)
- Winnington Park (5)
- Birkenhead Park (4)
- Sale FC (2)
- Chester (1)
- Lymm (1)
- Sale Jets (1)
- Wilmslow (1)

== See also ==
- Cheshire RFU
- Cheshire Vase
- Cheshire Bowl
- Cheshire Plate
- English rugby union system
- Rugby union in England
