= Cheshire RFU Vase =

Cheshire Vase
- Sport: Rugby Union
- Instituted: 2005; 21 years ago
- Number of teams: 8
- Country: England
- Holders: Wirral (2nd title) (2017–18)
- Most titles: Northwich (4 titles)
- Website: Cheshire RFU

The Cheshire Vase is an annual rugby union knock-out club competition organized by the Cheshire Rugby Football Union, and was introduced during the 2005-06 season with Anselmians being the first ever winners. The Vase is currently a stand-alone competition open to club sides based in either Cheshire, Merseyside or the Isle of Man that are ranked at tier 6 (North 1 West) and 7 (South Lancs/Cheshire 1) of the English league system. It is the second most important club competition organized by the Cheshire RFU behind the Cheshire Cup.

The present format is as a knock-out cup with a quarter-final, semi-final and final which is held at a neutral venue during the latter stages of the season (March–May). At present Cheshire Vase finals are held on the same date and same venue as the Cheshire Bowl final.

== Cheshire Vase winners ==
Cheshire Vase Finals
Season	Winner	Score	Runners–up	Venue
2005-06	Anselmians	25-3	Wirral	Bradwell Road, Sandbach
2006-07	Northwich	10-9	Wirral	Upper Park, Birkenhead
2007-08	Sandbach	10-7	Northwich	Burrows Hill, Winnington
2008-09	Wirral	20-10	Chester	Hartsfield, Moreton
2009-10	Northwich	29-10	Bowdon	Hartsfield, Moreton
2010-11	Altrincham Kersal	51-22	Anselmians	Crouchley Lane, Lymm
2011-12	Sandbach	25-13	Anselmians	Burrows Hill, Winnington
2012-13	Sale FC	19-11	Wirral	Memorial Ground, Wilmslow
2013-14	Altrincham Kersal	17-13	New Brighton	Burrows Hill, Winnington
2014-15	Wilmslow	37-0	Crewe & Nantwich	Burrows Hill, Winnington
2015-16	Birkenhead Park	44-8	Crewe & Nantwich	Bradwell Road, Sandbach
2016-17	Northwich	36-10	Birkenhead Park	The Vagrants Ground, Nantwich
2017-18	Wirral	17-14	Sandbach	Burrows Hill, Winnington
2018-19	Northwich	24-17	Birkenhead Park	Hartsfield, Moreton

== Number of wins ==
- Northwich (4)
- Altrincham Kersal (2)
- Sandbach (2)
- Wirral (2)
- Anselmians (1)
- Birkenhead Park (1)
- Sale FC (1)
- Wilmslow (1)

== See also ==
- Cheshire RFU
- Cheshire Cup
- Cheshire Bowl
- Cheshire Plate
- English rugby union system
- Rugby union in England
