= Cheshire RFU Plate =

Annual rugby competition in Cheshire, England

Cheshire Plate
- Sport: Rugby Union
- Instituted: 1981; 45 years ago
- Number of teams: 7
- Country: England
- Holders: Ellesmere Port (1st title) (2016–17)
- Most titles: Oldershaw (4 titles)
- Website: Cheshire RFU

The Cheshire Plate is an annual rugby union knock-out club competition organised by the Cheshire Rugby Football Union. It was introduced in 1981 for teams that were eliminated from the preliminary and 1st rounds of the Cheshire Cup, with Old Instonians being the first ever winners. Initially the secondary competition in the region, in recent years the Plate has become stand-alone competition open to club sides based in either Cheshire, Merseyside or the Isle of Man that are ranked at tier 8 (South Lancs/Cheshire 2) and 9 (South Lancs/Cheshire 3) of the English league system – although some teams that compete are invited come from outside the official league structure. It is currently the fourth most important club competition organised by the Cheshire RFU behind the Cheshire Bowl (3rd), Cheshire Vase (2nd) and Cheshire Cup (1st).

The present format is as a knock-out cup with a quarter-final, semi-final and final which is held at a neutral venue during the latter stages of the season (March–May). At present Cheshire Plate finals are held on the same date and same venue as the more prestigious Cheshire Cup final.

== Cheshire Plate winners ==
Cheshire Plate Finals
| Season | Winner | Score | Runners–up | Venue |
| 1980–81 | Old Instonians | | Port Sunlight | Upper Park, Birkenhead |
| 1981–82 | Macclesfield | 22–14 | Winnington Park | Memorial Ground, Wilmslow |
| 1982–83 | New Brighton | 23–9 | Mid Cheshire College | Birkenhead Park, Birkenhead |
| 1983–84 | Chester | 17–7 | Crewe & Nantwich | Memorial Ground, Wilmslow |
| 1984–85 | Sandbach | 11–9 | Macclesfield | Memorial Ground, Wilmslow |
| 1985–86 | Port Sunlight | | Oldershaw | Reeds Lane, New Brighton |
| 1986–87 | Davenport | | Port Sunlight | Hare Lane, Chester |
| 1987–88 | Mid Cheshire College | 23–7 | Oldershaw | Hare Lane, Chester |
| 1988–89 | Ashton-on-Mersey | 13–0 | Helsby | Hare Lane, Chester |
| 1989–90 | Port Sunlight | 11–9 | Old Anselmians | Hare Lane Chester |
| 1990–91 | Oldershaw | | Crewe & Nantwich | Hare Lane, Chester |
| 1991–92 | New Brighton | | Wilmslow | Memorial Ground, Wilmslow |
| 1992–93 | Oldershaw | | Congleton | Hare Lane, Chester |
| 1993–94 | Macclesfield | | Wallasey | Crouchley Lane, Lymm |
| 1994–95 | Wilmslow | | Birkenhead Park | Crouchley Lane, Lymm |
| 1995–96 | Crewe & Nantwich | 20–15 | Wirral | Crouchley Lane, Lymm |
| 1996–97 | Old Anselmians | 20–13 | Caldy | Crouchley Lane, Lymm |
| 1997–98 | Altrincham Kersal | | Prenton | Burrows Hill, Winnington |
| 1998–99 | Stockport | | Prenton | Hare Lane, Chester |
| 1999-00 | Runcorn | 14–11 | Crewe & Nantwich | Hare Lane, Chester |
| 2000–01 | Runcorn | | Caldy | Crouchley Lane, Lymm |
| 2001–02 | Runcorn | 22–20 | Ellesmere Port | Crouchley Lane, Lymm |
| 2002–03 | Wirral | 8–6 | Old Anselmians | |
| 2003–04 | Crewe & Nantwich | 27–13 | Ellesmere Port | The Memorial Ground, Stockport |
| 2004–05 | Northwich | 26–3 | Oxton Parkonians | Memorial Ground, Clatterbridge |
| 2005–06 | Sale FC | 45–10 | Marple | |
| 2006–07 | Wallasey | 29–19 | Crewe & Nantwich | Upper Park, Birkenhead |
| 2007–08 | Wallasey | 17–12 | Crewe & Nantwich | Burrows Hill, Winnington |
| 2008–09 | Ashton-on-Mersey | 22–21 | Oldershaw | Burrows Hill, Winnington |
| 2009–10 | Holmes Chapel | 10–3 | Prenton | Hartsfield, Moreton |
| 2010–11 | Crewe & Nantwich | 39–7 | Prenton | Crouchley Lane, Lymm |
| 2011–12 | Southern Nomads | 18–13 | Prenton | Hartsfield, Moreton |
| 2012–13 | Wallasey | 22–14 | Southern Nomads | Bradwell Road, Sandbach |
| 2013–14 | Southern Nomads | 24–17 | Oxton Parkonians | Burrows Hill, Winnington |
| 2014–15 | Oldershaw | 32–15 | Oxton Parkonians | Burrows Hill, Winnington |
| 2015–16 | Oldershaw | 20–17 | Ellesmere Park | Memorial Ground, Clatterbridge |
| 2016–17 | Port Sunlight | 26–8 | Oldershaw | Memorial Ground, Clatterbridge |
| 2017–18 | Ellesmere Port | 43–0 | Southern Nomads | Paton Field, Thurstaston |
| 2018–19 | Oldershaw | 11–5 | Ellesmere Port | Hartsfield, Moreton |

== Number of wins ==
- Oldershaw (5)
- Crewe & Nantwich (3)
- Port Sunlight (3)
- Runcorn (3)
- Wallasey (3)
- Ashton-on-Mersey (2)
- Macclesfield (2)
- New Brighton (2)
- Northwich (2) (Note: Northwich also won the competition back when they were known as Mid Cheshire College.)
- Southern Nomads (2)
- Altrincham Kersal (1)
- Anselmians (1)
- Chester (1)
- Davenport (1)
- Ellesmere Port (1)
- Holmes Chapel (1)
- Old Instonians (1)
- Sale FC (1)
- Sandbach (1)
- Stockport (1)
- Wilmslow (1)
- Wirral (1)

== See also ==
- Cheshire RFU
- Cheshire Cup
- Cheshire Vase
- Cheshire Bowl
- English rugby union system
- Rugby union in England
