= Cheshire RFU Bowl =

Cheshire Bowl
- Sport: Rugby Union
- Instituted: 2009; 17 years ago
- Number of teams: 4
- Country: England
- Holders: Winnington Park (3rd title) (2017-2018)
- Most titles: Winnington Park (3 titles)
- Website: Cheshire RFU

The Cheshire Bowl is an annual rugby union knock-out club competition organized by the Cheshire Rugby Football Union, and was introduced during the 2009–10 season with Winnington Park being the first ever winners. The Bowl is currently a stand-alone competition that is open to club sides based in Cheshire, Merseyside or the Isle of Man that are ranked at tier 8 (South Lancs/Cheshire 2) of the English league system - although some teams may be invited from outside the official leagues. It is the third most important competition organized by the Cheshire RFU behind the Cheshire Vase (2nd) and Cheshire Cup (1st).

The present format is as a knock-out cup with a semi-final and final which is held at a neutral venue during the latter stages of the season (March–May). At present Cheshire Bowl finals are held at the same date and venue as the Cheshire Vase final.

== Cheshire Bowl winners ==
Cheshire Bowl Finals
Season	Winner	Score	Runners–up	Venue
2009-10	Winnington Park	19-14	Anselmians	Hartsfield, Moreton
2010-11	Winnington Park	29-22	Dukinfield	Crouchley Lane, Lymm
2011-12	Sale FC	24-3	Ashton-on-Mersey	Burrows Hill, Winnington
2012-13	No Competition			
2013-14	Bowdon	32-27	Oswestry	Burrows Hill, Winnington
2014-15	Southern Nomads	12-11	Ashton-on-Mersey	Burrows Hill, Winnington
2015-16	Hoylake	29-22	Dukinfield	Memorial Ground, Clatterbridge
2016-17	Hoylake	25-20	Winnington Park	The Vagrants Ground, Nantwich
2017-18	Winnington Park	38-21	New Brighton FC	Upper Park, Birkenhead
2018-19	Crewe & Nantwich	21-8	Winnington Park	Hartsfield, Moreton

== Number of wins ==
- Winnington Park (3)
- Hoylake (2)
- Bowdon (1)
- Sale (1)
- Southern Nomads (1)
- Crewe & Nantwich (1)

== See also ==
- Cheshire RFU
- Cheshire Cup
- Cheshire Vase
- Cheshire Plate
- English rugby union system
- Rugby union in England
