= Steve Rule =

Wales international rugby league & union footballer and RU coach

Personal information
- Full name: Stephen Rule
- Born: 5 June 1952 (age 74) Bebington, England

Playing information

Rugby union
- Position: Fly-half
Club
Years	Team	Pld	T	G	FG	P
≤1973–73	Loughborough Students RUFC
1973–78	Sale
	Total	0	0	0	0	0
Representative
Years	Team	Pld	T	G	FG	P
≤1973–73	English Universities
≥1973–≤78	Cheshire

Rugby league
- Position: Fullback
Club
Years	Team	Pld	T	G	FG	P
1978–83	Salford	117	23	384	11	848
1983–84	St. Helens	40	4	49	0	118
	Total	157	27	433	11	966
Representative
Years	Team	Pld	T	G	FG	P
1981	Wales	1		2		4

Coaching information
Representative
Years	Team	Gms	W	D	L	W%
2000–	Cheshire
1989–92	Sale
1997–00	Lymm RFC
2000–02	New Brighton
2002–06	Macclesfield RUFC

Stephen "Steve" Rule (born 5 June 1952) is an English-born former rugby union and professional rugby league footballer who played in the 1970s and 1980s, and current rugby union coach. He played representative level rugby union (RU) for English Universities Rugby Union and Cheshire Rugby Football Union, and at club level for Loughborough Students RUFC and Sale, as a fly-half, and representative level rugby league (RL) for Wales, and at club level for Salford and St. Helens, as a fullback, and coached representative level rugby union (RU) for Cheshire Rugby Football Union, and at club level for Sale, Lymm RFC, New Brighton and Macclesfield RUFC.

== Background ==
Steve Rule was born in Bebington, Cheshire, England.

== Playing career ==
=== International honours ===
Steve Rule won a cap for Wales (RL) while at Salford in 1981, qualifying through his grandparents who were born in Aberdare.

=== Rugby union achievements ===
Steve Rule won the Universities Athletic Union, Old Belvedere, Bridgend and Glasgow Rugby sevens tournaments with Loughborough Students RUFC in 1973, and represented England in the Bermuda Classic Tournament in 1989.

=== Career records ===
Until extended to 14-goals by Steve Blakeley in 2003, Steve Rule jointly held Salford's "Most goals in a game" record with 13-goals scored against Doncaster on 4 September 1981, with Gus Risman and David Watkins.

== Coaching career ==
In 1991, Rule returned to Sale as a coach. At the time, anyone who had played rugby league professionally were normally banned from any involvement in rugby union, but Rule became one of the first English players to be re-instated by the Rugby Football Union. He also went on to coach at Lymm RU, New Brighton, and Macclesfield.

In 2011, he returned to Lymm as director of rugby.

== Outside of rugby ==
Steve Rule retired from playing rugby in 1985 following a neck injury, then worked as Head of the Pupil Referral Service at Wigan Council. He has since retired.
