= North Premier =

Level five league in the English rugby union system

- Sport: Rugby Union
- Instituted: 1987; 39 years ago (as North Division 1)
- Ceased: 2022; 4 years ago
- Country: England
- Most titles: Bradford & Bingley, Darlington Mowden Park, Huddersfield, Kendal, Morley, Otley and Preston Grasshoppers (2 titles)
- Website: clubs.rfu.com

North Premier was a level five league in the English rugby union system, with the fourteen teams drawn from across Northern England. The other leagues at this level were London & South East Premier, Midlands Premier and South West Premier. The RFU reorganised the level five leagues for season 2022–23, with an increase from four to six and reducing the teams in each from fourteen to twelve. The teams in this league now play in either Regional 1 North East or Regional 1 North West.

== Format ==
The fourteen teams in this league were drawn from across northern England with the champions promoted to National League 2 North and the runner-up going into a play-off with the second placed team from Midlands Premier with the winner also being promoted. The league's bottom three teams are relegated to either North 1 East or North 1 West depending on their geographic location. The league was changed at the beginning of the 2009–10 season following reorganisation by the Rugby Football Union when the league was originally known as North Division 1. A further name change from National League 3 North to its final name for the 2017–18 season by the RFU in order to lessen confusion for the series of regional leagues.

The season ran from September to May and comprised twenty-six rounds of matches, with each club playing each of its rivals home and away. The results of the matches contributed points to the league table as follows:

- 4 points are awarded for a win
- 2 points are awarded for a draw
- 0 points are awarded for a loss, however
- 1 losing (bonus) point is awarded to a team that loses a match by 7 points or fewer
- 1 additional (bonus) point is awarded to a team scoring 4 tries or more in a match

== 2021–22 ==
Nine of the fourteen teams participated in the previous season's competition. They were joined by Otley and Preston Grasshoppers who were relegated from National League 2 North, and promoted sides York (from North 1 East) together with Burnage and Northwich RUFC (both from North 1 West).

The previous season's champions Blaydon were promoted into National League 2 North alongside Harrogate (who won the virtual play-off against Newport runners-up in Midlands Premier), while the relegated teams were Carlisle RFC (to North 1 West) together with Morpeth and Ilkley RFC (both to North 1 East).

The teams competing in 2021–22 achieved their places in the league based on performances in 2019–20, the 'previous season' column in the table below refers to that season not 2020–21.

Twelve of the fourteen teams from 2021 to 2022 were placed into one of the new level five leagues for 2022–23. Alnwick, Billingham, Sandal and York were placed into Regional 1 North East while Blackburn, Burnage, Kirkby Lonsdale, Lymm, Macclesfield, Northwich, Rossendale and Wirral were placed into Regional 1 North West. The top two teams in 2021–22, Otley and Preston Grasshoppers, were promoted to the level four league National League 2 North. No teams were relegated to level six.

=== Participating teams and locations ===
Team	Ground	Capacity	City/Area	Previous season
Alnwick	Greensfield	1,200 (200 in stand)	Alnwick, Northumberland	11th
Billingham	Greenwood Road	1,500 (100 seats)	Billingham, County Durham	5th
Blackburn	Ramsgreave Drive		Blackburn, Lancashire	6th
Burnage	Varley Park		Stockport, Greater Manchester	Promoted from North 1 West (champions)
Kirkby Lonsdale	Underley Park		Kirkby Lonsdale, Cumbria	8th
Lymm	Crouchley Lane	1,000	Lymm, Cheshire	7th
Macclesfield	Priory Park	1,250 (250 seats)	Macclesfield, Cheshire	3rd
Northwich	Moss Farm		Northwich, Cheshire	Promoted from North 1 West (playoff)
Otley	Cross Green	7,000 (852 seats)	Otley, Leeds, West Yorkshire	Relegated from Nat 2 North (12th)
Preston Grasshoppers	Lightfoot Green	2,250 (250 seats)	Preston, Lancashire	Relegated from Nat 2 North (13th)
Rossendale	Marl Pits	1,100 (100 stand)	Rawtenstall, Rossendale, Lancashire	9th
Sandal	Milnthorpe Green		Sandal Magna, Wakefield, West Yorkshire	4th
Wirral	The Memorial Ground		Clatterbridge, Wirral	10th
York	Clifton Park		York, North Yorkshire	Promoted from North 1 East (champions)

Locations of the 2021–22 North Premier teams

=== Final league table ===
North Premier 2021–22
	Team	Played	Won	Drawn	Lost	Points for	Points against	Points diff	Try bonus	Loss bonus	Points	Adj pts
1	Otley	26	24	0	2	1076	310	766	20	0	116	
2	Preston Grasshoppers	26	23	1	2	1105	299	806	19	0	113	
3	Blackburn	26	18	2	6	1001	526	475	19	3	98	
4	Billingham	26	18	1	7	837	432	405	16	2	92	
5	Lymm	26	17	0	9	829	543	286	15	3	86	
6	Macclesfield	26	15	0	11	840	565	275	13	4	77	
7	Alnwick	26	14	1	11	854	563	291	12	3	73	
8	Rossendale	26	12	1	13	612	669	−57	9	2	61	
9	Wirral	26	11	0	15	562	669	−107	8	5	58	
10	York	26	9	1	16	643	584	59	11	8	58	
11	Sandal	26	7	2	17	605	853	−248	8	3	43	
12	Burnage	26	5	0	21	545	1035	−490	8	4	32	
13	Kirkby Lonsdale	26	3	2	21	298	1288	−990	4	0	20	
14	Northwich	26	0	1	25	168	1639	−1471	1	0	−2	−5
If teams are level at any stage, tiebreakers are applied in the following order: 1. Number of matches won 2. Difference between points for and against 3. Total number of points for 4. Aggregate number of points scored in matches between tied teams 5. Number of matches won excluding the first match, then the second and so on until the tie is settled
Green background are the promotion places. Pink background are relegation places. Updated: 2 June 2022; Source:

== 2020–21 ==
On 30 October the RFU announced, that due to the coronavirus pandemic, a decision had been taken to cancel Adult Competitive Leagues (National League 1 and below) for the 2020/21 season meaning North Premier was not contested.

== 2019–20 ==
Ten of the fourteen teams participated in last season's competition. They are joined by Macclesfield who were relegated from National League 2 North, and Blackburn, Carlisle and Morpeth who were promoted into the division. Last season's champions Hull were promoted into National League 2 North, while the relegated teams were Vale of Lune and Wilmslow who all drop down into North 1 West and Kendal Rugby Union Football Club, Kendal who were relegated to North 1 East.

=== Participating teams and locations ===
Team	Ground	Capacity	City/Area	Previous season
Alnwick	Greensfield	1,200 (200 in stand)	Alnwick, Northumberland	9th
Billingham	Greenwood Road	1,500 (100 seats)	Billingham, County Durham	4th
Blackburn	Ramsgreave Drive		Blackburn, Lancashire	Promoted from North 1 West (playoff)
Blaydon	Crow Trees	2,000 (400 seats)	Swalwell, Tyne and Wear	Runners up (lost playoff)
Carlisle	Rugby Ground, Warwick Road	1,500 (250 seats)	Carlisle, Cumbria	Promoted from North 1 West (champions)
Harrogate	Rudding Lane	2,000	Harrogate, North Yorkshire	3rd
Ilkley	Stacks Field	2,000 (40 seats)	Ilkley, West Yorkshire	8th
Kirkby Lonsdale	Underley Park		Kirkby Lonsdale, Cumbria	10th
Lymm	Crouchley Lane	1,000	Lymm, Cheshire	11th
Macclesfield	Priory Park	1,250 (250 seats)	Macclesfield, Cheshire	Relegated from National 2 North (14th)
Morpeth	Grange House Field	1,000	Morpeth, Northumberland	Promoted from North 1 East (champions)
Rossendale	Marl Pits	1,100 (100 stand)	Rawtenstall, Rossendale, Lancashire	5th
Sandal	Milnthorpe Green		Sandal Magna, Wakefield, West Yorkshire	6th
Wirral	The Memorial Ground		Clatterbridge, Wirral	7th

Locations of the 2019–20 North Premier teams

== 2018–19 ==
Ten of the fourteen teams participated in last season's competition. They are joined by Blaydon who were relegated from National League 2 North, while Alnwick, Vale of Lune and Wilmslow were promoted into the division. Preston Grasshoppers were promoted as champions into National League 2 North, while the relegated teams were Birkenhead Park (North 1 West), Morley and Pocklington (both North 1 East).

=== Participating teams and locations ===
Team	Ground	Capacity	City/Area	Previous season
Alnwick	Greensfield	1,200 (200 in stand)	Alnwick, Northumberland	Promoted from North 1 East (champions)
Billingham	Greenwood Road	1,500 (100 seats)	Billingham, County Durham	6th
Blaydon	Crow Trees	2,000 (400 seats)	Swalwell, Tyne and Wear	Relegated from National 2 North (15th)
Harrogate	Rudding Lane	2,000	Harrogate, North Yorkshire	3rd
Hull	Ferens Ground	1,500 (288 seats)	Kingston upon Hull, East Riding of Yorkshire	Runners up (lost playoff)
Ilkley	Stacks Field	2,000 (40 seats)	Ilkley, West Yorkshire	7th
Kendal	Mint Bridge Stadium	3,500 (258 seats)	Kendal, Cumbria	10th
Kirkby Lonsdale	Underley Park		Kirkby Lonsdale, Cumbria	8th
Lymm	Crouchley Lane	1,000	Lymm, Cheshire	4th
Rossendale	Marl Pits	1,100 (100 stand)	Rawtenstall, Rossendale, Lancashire	5th
Sandal	Milnthorpe Green		Sandal Magna, Wakefield, West Yorkshire	11th
Vale of Lune	Powder House Lane	4,000 (50 seats)	Lancaster, Lancashire	Promoted from North 1 West (Champions)
Wilmslow	Memorial Ground		Wilmslow, Cheshire	Promoted from North 1 West (playoff)
Wirral	The Memorial Ground		Clatterbridge, Wirral	9th

Locations of the 2018–19 North Premier teams

== 2017–18 ==
Nine of the fourteen teams participated in last season's competition. They are joined by Preston Grasshoppers and Harrogate who were relegated from National League 2 North, while Pocklington, Kirkby Lonsdale and Birkenhead Park are promoted into the division. Huddersfield were promoted as champions into National League 2 North, with Firwood Waterloo and Stockport both relegated to North 1 West and Cleckheaton dropping to North 1 East. In order to address an imbalance of teams at tier 5, Doncaster Phoenix were level transferred to Midlands Premier. This season was the first that Kendal played at the new Mint Bridge Stadium.

=== Participating teams and locations ===
Team	Ground	Capacity	City/Area	Previous season
Billingham	Greenwood Road	1,500 (100 seats)	Billingham, County Durham	5th
Birkenhead Park	Upper Park		Birkenhead, Wirral	Promoted from North 1 West (playoffs)
Harrogate	Rudding Lane	2,000	Harrogate, North Yorkshire	Relegated from National 2 North (14th)
Hull	Ferens Ground	1,500 (288 seats)	Kingston upon Hull, East Riding of Yorkshire	3rd
Ilkley	Stacks Field	2,000 (40 seats)	Ilkley, West Yorkshire	9th
Kendal	Mint Bridge Stadium (Note: Kendal moved to the brand new "Mint Bridge Stadium" in 2017–18 which should not be confused with the old Mint Bridge ground.)	3,500 (258 seats) (Note: This capacity is for the new Mint Bridge ground as opposed to the old ground, which had a capacity of 4,600 (600 seats).)	Kendal, Cumbria	7th
Kirkby Lonsdale	Underley Park		Kirkby Lonsdale, Cumbria	Promoted from North 1 West (champions)
Lymm	Crouchley Lane	1,000	Lymm, Cheshire	8th
Morley	Scatcherd Lane	6,000 (1,000 seats)	Morley, West Yorkshire	10th
Pocklington	Percy Road		Pocklington, East Riding of Yorkshire	Promoted from North 1 East (champions)
Preston Grasshoppers	Lightfoot Green	2,250 (250 seats)	Preston, Lancashire	Relegated from National 2 North (16th)
Rossendale	Marl Pits	1,100 (100 stand)	Rawtenstall, Rossendale, Lancashire	2nd (lost playoff)
Sandal	Milnthorpe Green		Sandal Magna, Wakefield, West Yorkshire	6th
Wirral	The Memorial Ground		Clatterbridge, Wirral	4th

Locations of the 2017–18 North Premier teams

=== Final league table ===
National League 3 North 2017–18
	Team	Played	Won	Drawn	Lost	Points for	Points against	Points diff	Try bonus	Loss bonus	Points
1	Preston Grasshoppers (P)	26	23	1	2	897	410	487	22	2	118
2	Hull	26	20	3	3	815	340	475	18	2	106
3	Harrogate	26	19	1	6	697	477	220	16	4	98
4	Lymm	26	17	2	7	691	382	309	11	5	88
5	Rossendale	25	17	0	8	636	571	65	14	1	83
6	Billingham	26	16	1	9	794	501	293	13	3	82
7	Ilkley	25	12	1	12	523	532	−9	7	5	62
8	Kirkby Lonsdale	26	10	0	16	565	584	−19	7	10	57
9	Wirral	26	9	0	17	573	715	−142	12	6	54
10	Kendal	26	10	1	15	537	635	−98	6	5	53
11	Sandal	26	7	1	18	528	694	−166	8	8	46
12	Birkenhead Park	26	5	1	20	452	874	−422	5	6	33
13	Morley	26	6	1	19	324	715	−391	2	3	31
14	Pocklington (R)	26	3	1	22	375	977	–602	6	3	23
If teams are level at any stage, tiebreakers are applied in the following order: 1. Number of matches won 2. Difference between points for and against 3. Total number of points for 4. Aggregate number of points scored in matches between tied teams 5. Number of matches won excluding the first match, then the second and so on until the tie is settled
Green background is the promotion place. Blue background is the play-off place. Pink background are relegation places. Updated: 22 November 2021; Source: "National League 3 North". England Rugby.

== 2016–17 ==
Nine of the fourteen teams participated in last season's competition. They are joined by Huddersfield and Sandal who were relegated from National 2 North while Doncaster Phoenix, Morley and Kendal were promoted into the league. Sheffield Tigers were promoted as champions into National 2 North while Burnage and Huddersfield Y.M.C.A. were relegated to North 1 East and Birkenhead Park dropped to North 1 West. In order to address a league imbalance, 7th placed Sheffield were level transferred to National League 3 Midlands.

=== Participating teams and locations ===
Team	Ground	Capacity	City/Area	Previous season
Billingham	Greenwood Road	1,500 (100 seats)	Billingham, County Durham	9th
Cleckheaton	Moorend		Cleckheaton, West Yorkshire	10th
Doncaster Phoenix	Castle Park	5,000	Doncaster, South Yorkshire	promoted from North 1 East (champions)
Firwood Waterloo	St Anthony's Road	9,950 (950 seats)	Blundellsands, Merseyside	4th
Huddersfield	Lockwood Park	1,500 (500 seats)	Huddersfield, South Yorkshire	relegated from National 2 North (16th)
Hull	Ferens Ground	1,500 (288 seats)	Kingston upon Hull, East Riding of Yorkshire	5th
Ilkley	Stacks Field	2,000 (40 seats)	Ilkley, West Yorkshire	8th
Kendal	Mint Bridge	4,600 (600 seats)	Kendal, Cumbria	promoted from North 1 West (champions)
Lymm	Crouchley Lane	1,000	Lymm, Cheshire	3rd
Morley	Scatcherd Lane	6,000 (1,000 seats)	Morley, West Yorkshire	promoted from North 1 East (via play-off)
Rossendale	Marl Pits	1,100 (100 stand)	Rawtenstall, Rossendale, Lancashire	6th
Sandal	Milnthorpe Green		Sandal Magna, Wakefield, West Yorkshire	relegated from National 2 North (14th)
Stockport	The Memorial Ground	500	Stockport, Greater Manchester	11th
Wirral	The Memorial Ground		Clatterbridge, Wirral	2nd (lost promotion play-off)

Locations of the 2016-17 North Premier teams

=== Final league table ===
National League 3 North 2016–17
	Team	Played	Won	Drawn	Lost	Points for	Points against	Points diff	Try bonus	Loss bonus	Points
1	Huddersfield (P)	26	26	0	0	1180	263	917	20	0	124
2	Rossendale	26	21	0	5	852	443	409	14	1	99
3	Hull	26	20	0	6	837	460	377	17	0	97
4	Wirral	26	18	0	8	814	501	313	16	1	89
5	Billingham	26	17	0	9	779	542	237	16	3	87
6	Sandal	26	16	0	10	935	556	379	16	5	85
7	Kendal	26	13	0	13	548	498	50	7	6	65
8	Lymm	26	12	0	14	629	632	−3	9	4	61
9	Ilkley	26	11	0	15	571	576	−5	7	8	59
10	Morley	26	8	0	18	577	864	−287	10	4	46
11	Doncaster Phoenix	26	8	0	18	538	837	−299	6	3	41
12	Cleckheaton (R)	26	7	0	19	523	739	–216	7	4	39
13	Firwood Waterloo (R)	26	5	0	21	422	1019	−597	4	5	29
14	Stockport (R)	26	0	0	26	229	1504	−1275	1	1	2
If teams are level at any stage, tiebreakers are applied in the following order: 1. Number of matches won 2. Difference between points for and against 3. Total number of points for 4. Aggregate number of points scored in matches between tied teams 5. Number of matches won excluding the first match, then the second and so on until the tie is settled
Green background is the promotion place. Blue background is the play-off place. Pink background are relegation places. Updated: 29 April 2017; Source: "National League 3 North". England Rugby.

=== Promotion play-off ===
Each season, the runners-up in the National League 3 North, and National League 3 Midlands participate in a play-off for promotion to National League 2 North. The team with the best playing record, in this case Rossendale, host the match and they lost to their opponents Sheffield 31 – 32.

Team	Played	Won	Drawn	Lost	Points for	Points against	Points diff	Try bonus	Loss bonus	Points
Rossendale	26	21	0	5	852	443	409	14	1	99
Sheffield	26	19	0	7	717	434	283	16	4	96

29 April 2017
15:00

Rossendale	31 – 32	Sheffield

Marl Pits

== 2015–16 ==
Sheffield Tigers, are the champions, winning the league by 16 points. It was Sheffield's second promotion to National 2 North; in 2010–11 they won promotion via the play-off (as Midland representatives), beating Chester. Wirral, the second-placed team lost their play-off match against Hinckley and remain in this league for next season. Three clubs are relegated, Huddersfield YMCA to North East 1, and Birkenhead Park and Burnage, both to North West 1 .

=== Participating clubs and locations ===
Nine of the fourteen teams participated in last season's competition. They were joined by two teams relegated from National League 2 North, Hull and Stockport; and by three promoted teams, Birkenhead Park, Ilkley and Sheffield. The teams leaving the league were the 2014–15 champions, Sale who were promoted to National League 2 North, along with the runner-up Sandal, the play-off winner against Hinckley; Morley, South Shields West and Beverley were all relegated to North 1 East.

Team	Ground	Capacity	City/Area	Previous season
Billingham	Greenwood Road	1,500 (100 seats)	Billingham, County Durham	7th
Birkenhead Park	Birkenhead Park		Birkenhead, Wirral	promoted from North 1 West (champions)
Burnage	Varley Park		Stockport, Greater Manchester	11th
Cleckheaton	Moorend		Cleckheaton, West Yorkshire	6th
Firwood Waterloo	St Anthony's Road	9,950 (950 seats)	Blundellsands, Merseyside	4th
Huddersfield YMCA	Laund Hill		Huddersfield, West Yorkshire	8th
Hull	Ferens Ground	1,500 (288 seats)	Kingston upon Hull, East Riding of Yorkshire	relegated from National 2 North (15th)
Ilkley	Stacks Field	2,000 (40 seats)	Ilkley, West Yorkshire	promoted from North 1 East (champions)
Lymm	Crouchley Lane	1,000	Lymm, Cheshire	9th
Rossendale	Marl Pits	1,100 (100 stand)	Rossendale, Lancashire	5th
Sheffield	Abbeydale Park	3,200 (100 seats)	Sheffield, South Yorkshire	promoted from North 1 East (via play-off)
Sheffield Tigers	Dore Moor		Sheffield, South Yorkshire	3rd
Stockport	The Memorial Ground	500	Stockport, Greater Manchester	relegated from National 2 North (16th)
Wirral	Memorial Ground		Clatterbridge, Wirral	10th

Locations of the 2015-16 North Premier teams

=== Final league table ===
National League 3 North 2015–16
	Team	Played	Won	Drawn	Lost	Points for	Points against	Points diff	Try bonus	Loss bonus	Points
1	Sheffield Tigers (C)	26	22	0	4	984	314	670	17	4	109
2	Wirral	26	19	0	7	677	486	191	13	4	93
3	Lymm	26	15	1	10	635	482	153	11	6	79
4	Firwood Waterloo	26	17	1	8	590	537	53	11	2	78
5	Hull	26	15	0	11	653	454	199	9	9	78
6	Rossendale	26	14	1	11	720	613	107	13	3	74
7	Sheffield	26	14	2	10	595	502	93	9	4	73
8	Ilkley	26	14	1	11	571	609	–38	7	5	70
9	Billingham	26	12	0	14	614	594	20	10	6	64
10	Cleckheaton	26	11	0	15	508	646	–138	6	4	54
11	Stockport	26	8	1	17	588	770	–182	10	7	51
12	Huddersfield YMCA (R)	26	7	1	18	546	813	–267	10	7	47
13	Birkenhead Park (R)	26	6	0	20	519	739	–220	7	10	41
14	Burnage (R)	26	4	0	22	359	1000	–641	1	3	20
If teams are level at any stage, tiebreakers are applied in the following order: 1. Number of matches won; 1. Difference between points for and against; 1. Total number of points for; 1. Aggregate number of points scored in matches between tied teams; 1. Number of matches won excluding the first match, then the second and so on until the tie is settled
Green background is the promotion place. Blue background is the play-off place. Pink background are relegation places. Updated: 27 April 2016; Source: "National League 3 North". England Rugby.

=== Promotion play-off ===
Each season, the runners-up in the National League 3 Midland, and National League 3 North participate in a play-off for promotion to National League 2 North. The team with the best playing record, in this case Hinckley, host the match and their opponents are Wirral.

Club	Played	Won	Drawn	Lost	Points for	Points against	Points diff	Try bonus	Loss bonus	Points
Hinckley (P)	26	22	1	3	790	343	447	16	2	108
Wirral	26	19	0	7	677	486	191	13	4	93

30 April 2016
15:00

Hinckley	33 – 20	Wirral
	Report

Leicester Road
Attendance: 650

== 2014–15 ==
=== Participating clubs ===
- Beverley
- Billingham
- Burnage
- Cleckheaton (promoted from North 1 East)
- Firwood Waterloo
- Huddersfield Y.M.C.A. (promoted from North 1 East)
- Lymm (transferred from National League 3 Midlands)
- Morley
- Rossendale
- Sale
- Sandal
- Sheffield Tigers (relegated from National League 2 North)
- Westoe
- Wirral (promoted from North 1 West)

== 2013–14 ==
=== Participating clubs ===
- Beverley (promoted from North 1 East)
- Billingham
- Bradford & Bingley
- Burnage
- Firwood Waterloo
- Huddersfield (relegated from National League 2 North)
- Morley (promoted from North 1 East)
- Penrith
- Percy Park
- Rossendale
- Sale (promoted from North 1 West)
- Sandal
- Stockport (relegated from National League 2 North)
- Westoe (relegated from National League 2 North)

== 2012–13 ==
=== Participating clubs ===
- Billingham (promoted from North 1 East)
- Birkenhead Park
- Bradford & Bingley
- Burnage
- Chester
- Harrogate (relegated from National League 2 North)
- Kendal (relegated from National League 2 North)
- Lymm
- Penrith
- Percy Park (promoted from North 1 East)
- Rossendale
- Sandal
- Waterloo
- West Hartlepool

== 2009–10 ==
=== Participating clubs ===
Inaugural clubs (first season as National 3 North)

- Beverley (now playing in North 1 East)
- Birkenhead Park (still playing in National 3 North)
- Chester (now playing in National 2 North)
- Cleckheaton (still playing in National 3 North)
- Darlington Mowden Park (now playing in National 2 North)
- Middlesbrough (now playing in Durham/Northumberland 1)
- Morley (now playing in North 1 East)
- Penrith (now playing in North 1 West)
- Rochdale (now playing in North 1 West)
- Rossendale (still playing in National 3 North)
- Sheffield Tigers (still playing in National 3 North)
- Stockport (still playing in National League 3 North)
- West Hartlepool (now playing in North 1 East)
- West Park St Helens (now playing in South Lancs/Cheshire 1)

== 2008–09 ==
=== Final league table ===
2008–09 North Division 1 Final League Table
Club	Played	Won	Drawn	Lost	Points for	Points against	Points diff	Points
Westoe	22	19	0	3	737	264	473	38
Hull	22	18	0	4	702	241	461	36
Morley R.F.C.	22	16	0	6	497	222	275	32
Sheffield Tigers RUFC	22	15	0	7	495	307	118	30
Birkenhead Park	22	14	1	7	373	331	42	29
Middlesbrough	22	11	0	11	477	421	56	22
West Hartlepool	22	9	0	13	356	420	–64	18
Stockport R.U.F.C	22	8	0	14	414	520	–106	16
Beverley	22	8	0	14	311	425	–114	16
Cleckheaton	22	5	1	16	293	654	–361	11
West Park St Helens	22	5	0	17	273	599	–326	10
Darlington RFC	22	3	0	19	254	769	–524	6

== Original teams ==
When league rugby began in 1987 this division contained the following teams:

- Hartlepool Rovers (now playing in Durham/Northumberland 1)
- Harrogate (now playing in National league 2 North)
- Hull & ER (now playing as Hull Ionians in National League 1)
- Kendal (now playing in North 1 West
- Middlesbrough (now playing in Yorkshire 1)
- Otley (now playing in National League 2 North)
- Tynedale (now playing in National League 2 North)
- Widnes
- Wigton
- Winnington Park (now playing in South Lancs/Cheshire 1
- West Park (now playing in Lancs/Cheshire Division 1

== North Premier honours ==
In the first season of the English rugby union league pyramid, sponsored by Courage, there was four, tier five leagues. The geographical area for teams in the north of England covered the ceremonial counties of Cheshire, Cumbria, Lancashire Northumberland and Yorkshire There were eleven teams in the league and they played each other once, giving each team ten matches. The other tier five leagues were London Division One, Midlands Division One and South West Division One. This system prevailed for five seasons, and in 1992–93 the number of teams increased from eleven to thirteen. The following season (1993–94) the league was reorganised and the four tier five leagues became two; National 5 North and National 5 South. After three seasons, in 1996–97, a further reorganisation occurred, and there was a return to four, tier five leagues; with North Division One covering the area of northern England. This system prevailed until 2009–10 when the number of teams was increased from twelve to fourteen and renamed National League Three North.

=== North Division 1 (1987–1993) ===
The original North Division 1 was a tier 5 league with promotion to Area League 2 North and relegation to North Division 2 (later split into two leagues known as North 1 East and North 1 West).

North Division One
Season	No of teams	No of matches	Champions	Runners–up	Relegated teams	Reference
1987–88	11	10	Winnington Park	Kendal	Widnes, Middlesbrough	
1988–89	11	10	Kendal	Tynedale	West Park	
1989–90	11	10	Otley	Harrogate	No relegation	
1990–91	11	10	Aspatria	Bradford & Bingley	Halifax	
1991–92	11	10	Rotherham	Tynedale	Birkenhead Park	
1992–93	13	12	Bradford & Bingley	Tynedale	Lymm	

=== North Division 1 (1993–1996) ===
At the end of the 1992–93 season the top six teams from North Division 1 and the top six from Midland Division 1 were combined to create National 5 North. North Division 1 dropped from a tier 5 league to a tier 6 league for the years that National 5 North was active.

North Division 1
Season	No of teams	Champions	Runners–up	Relegated teams
1993-94	13	Wharfedale	Sandal	Hartlepool Rovers, Northern, Vale of Lune
1994-95	13	Sandal	Stockton	Durham City
1995-96	13	Manchester	Macclesfield	No relegation (Note: Due to RFU restructuring of the English league structure there would be no relegation this season.)
Green backgrounds are promotion places.

=== North Division 1 (1996–2009) ===
For the end of the 1995–96 season National 5 North was discontinued and North Division One returned to being a tier 5 league. Promotion was to National 4 North (later known as National League 2 North), while relegation continued to North Division 2 until 2000–01, and then into either North 2 East or North 2 West (later known as North 1 East / North 1 West) in subsequent seasons.

North Division One
Season	No of teams	No of matches	Champions	Runners–up	Relegated teams	Reference
1996–97	12	22	Sedgley Park	Tynedale	Bradford & Bingley	
1997–98	12	22	New Brighton	Doncaster	West Park Bramhope	
1998–99	12	22	Doncaster	Northern	Bridlington, Broughton Park	
1999–00	12	22	Tynedale	Hull Ionians	Widnes, Winnington Park	
2000–01	12	22	Darlington Mowden Park	Blaydon	Northern, Stockton	
2001–02	12	22	Halifax	Hull Ionians	Wigton, Middlesbrough, Bradford & Bingley	
2002–03	12	22	Darlington	Macclesfield	Sandal, West Hartlepool	
2003–04	12	22	Bradford & Bingley	Cleckheaton	Huddersfield, Aspatria, Driffield	
2004–05	12	22	Preston Grasshoppers	Hull Ionians	Sheffield, Liverpool St Helens, Vale of Lune	
2005–06	12	22	Morley	West Park St Helens	Whitchurch, Middlesbrough, Longton	
2006–07	12	22	Caldy	Beverley	New Brighton, Chester, Stockport	
2007–08	12	22	Kendal	Huddersfield	Penrith, Altrincham Kersal	
2008–09	12	22	Westoe	Hull	No relegation	

=== National League 3 North (2009–2017) ===
For the 2009–10 season North Division One was renamed as National League 3 North following a restructuring of the national leagues leading to changes at all levels.

National League 3 North
Season	No of teams	No of matches	Champions	Runners–up	Relegated teams	Reference
2009–10	14	26	Morley	Stockport	West Hartlepool, Cleckheaton, West Park St Helens	
2010–11	14	26	Stockport	Chester	Rochdale, Billingham, Middlesbrough	
2011–12	14	26	Darlington Mowden Park	Rossendale	Morley, Altrincham Kersal, Beverley	
2012–13	14	26	Chester	Harrogate	West Hartlepool, Kendal, Birkenhead Park	
2013–14	14	26	Huddersfield	Stockport	Penrith, Percy Park, Bradford & Bingley	
2014–15	14	26	Sale FC	Sandal	Beverley, Westoe, Morley	
2015–16	14	26	Sheffield Tigers	Wirral	Huddersfield YMCA, Birkenhead Park, Burnage	
2016–17	14	26	Huddersfield	Rossendale	Stockport, Firwood Waterloo, Cleckheaton	
Green background are the promotion places.

=== North Premier (2017–2022) ===
The division was renamed North Premier for the 2017–18 season in order to make it more obvious that this was a regional division and the top one in the north.

North Premier
Season	No of teams	No of matches	Champions	Runners–up	Relegated teams	Reference
2017–18	14	26	Preston Grasshoppers	Hull	Pocklington, Morley, Birkenhead Park	
2018–19	14	26	Hull	Blaydon	Wilmslow, Vale of Lune, Kendal	
2019–20	14	21 (Note: Due to the COVID-19 pandemic in the United Kingdom the RFU cancelled all rugby below the Premiership with most clubs in North Premier having played 21 games, and a best playing record formula was used to decide the final table.)	Blaydon	Harrogate	Ilkley, Morpeth, Carlisle	
2020–21	Cancelled due to the COVID-19 pandemic in the United Kingdom.					
2021–22	14	26	Otley	Preston Grasshoppers	Awaiting an announcement from the RFU.	
Green background are the promotion places.

== Promotion play-offs ==
From 2000 to 2001 season until 2018–19 there was a play-off, between the league runners-up of North Premier and Midlands Premier, for the third and final promotion place to National League 2 North. The team with the superior league record has home advantage. As of the end of the 2018–19 season the northern teams have been stronger with twelve wins to the Midlands seven, while the home team has won thirteen times compared to the away teams six.

North Premier v Midlands Premier promotion play-off results
Season	Home team	Score	Away team	Venue	Attendance	Reference
2000–01	Blaydon (N)	31–12	Leicester Lions (M)	Crow Trees, Swalwell, County Durham		
2001–02	Hull Ionians (N)	35–22	Walsall (M)	Brantingham Park, Brantingham, East Riding of Yorkshire		
2002–03	Luctonians (M)	3–17	Macclesfield (N)	Mortimer Park, Kingsland, Herefordshire	1,000	
2003–04	Cleckheaton (N)	23–10	Kettering (M)	Cleckheaton Sports Club, Cleckheaton, West Yorkshire	900	
2004–05	Hull Ionians (N)	19–18	Kettering (M)	Brantingham Park, Brantingham, East Riding of Yorkshire		
2005–06	Bedford Athletic (M)	17–24	West Park St Helens (N)	Putnoe Woods, Bedford, Bedfordshire		
2006–07	Beverley (N)	7–3	Dudley Kingswinford (M)	Beaver Park, Beverley, East Riding of Yorkshire		
2007–08	Huddersfield (N)	22–7	Luctonians (M)	Lockwood Park, Huddersfield, West Yorkshire		
2008–09	Hull (N)	40–15	Chester (M)	Ferens Ground, Kingston upon Hull, East Riding of Yorkshire		
2009–10	Stockport (N)	10–18	Luctonians (M)	The Memorial Ground, Stockport, Greater Manchester	350	
2010–11	Sheffield Tigers (M)	16–14	Chester (N)	Dore Moor, Sheffield, South Yorkshire		
2011–12	Dudley Kingswinford (M)	36–27	Rossendale (N)	Heath Brook, Kingswinford, West Midlands	1,000	
2012–13	Sutton Coldfield (M)	13–28	Harrogate (N)	Roger Smoldon Ground, Sutton Coldfield, West Midlands	650	
2013–14	Stockport (N)	52–22	Sutton Coldfield (M)	The Memorial Ground, Stockport, Greater Manchester		
2014–15	Sandal (N)	20–10	Hinckley (M)	Milnthorpe Green, Sandal Magna, Wakefield, West Yorkshire	200	
2015–16	Hinckley (M)	33–20	Wirral (N)	Leicester Road, Hinckley, Leicestershire	650	
2016–17	Rossendale (N)	31–32	Sheffield (M)	Marl Pits, Rawtenstall, Lancashire	413	
2017–18	Hull (N)	22-31	Peterborough Lions (M)	Ferens Ground, Kingston upon Hull, East Riding of Yorkshire		
2018–19	Luctonians (M)	31–17	Blaydon (N)	Mortimer Park, Kingsland, Herefordshire	1,757	
2019–20	Cancelled due to COVID-19 pandemic in the United Kingdom. Best ranked runner up - Harrogate (N) - promoted instead.					
2020–21	Cancelled due to COVID-19 pandemic in the United Kingdom.					
2021–22	Cancelled due league reorganisation					
Green background represent the promoted teams. (M) stands for the Midlands teams while (N) stands for the Northern teams.

== Number of league titles ==
- Bradford & Bingley (2)
- Darlington Mowden Park (2)
- Huddersfield (2)
- Kendal (2)
- Morley (2)
- Otley (2)
- Preston Grasshoppers (2)
- Aspatria (1)
- Blaydon (1)
- Caldy (1)
- Chester (1)
- Darlington (1)
- Doncaster (1)
- Halifax (1)
- Hull (1)
- Manchester (1)
- New Brighton (1)
- Rotherham (1)
- Sale FC (1)
- Sandal (1)
- Sedgley Park (1)
- Sheffield Tigers (1)
- Stockport (1)
- Tynedale (1)
- Westoe (1) (Note: Currently known as South Shields Westoe.)
- Wharfedale (1)
- Winnington Park (1)

== See also ==
- English rugby union system
- Rugby union in England
