= North West 2 =

English Rugby Union league

- Sport: Rugby Union
- Instituted: 1987; 39 years ago
- Ceased: 2000; 26 years ago
- Country: England
- Website: clubs.rfu.com

North West 2 was an English Rugby Union league which was at the eighth tier of the domestic competition and was available to teams in North West England. Promoted teams moved up to North West 1 while relegated teams dropped to North West 3. The division was abolished at the end of the 1999–00 season due to RFU restructuring with teams being transferred to their relevant regional leagues such as South Lancs/Cheshire 1 or North Lancs/Cumbria.

== Original teams ==
When league rugby began in 1987 this division contained the following teams:

- Burnage
- Cockermouth
- Heaton Moor
- Leigh
- Macclesfield
- Newton-le-Willows
- Penrith
- Sandbach
- Sedgley Park
- Warrington
- Workington

== North West 2 Honours ==
=== North West 2 (1987–1993) ===
The original North West 2 was a tier 8 league with promotion up to North West 1 and relegation down to either North-West East/North 1 or North-West West 1.

North West 2 Honours
| Season | No of Teams | Champions | Runners–up | Relegated Teams |
| 1987–88 | 11 | Sedgley Park | Sandbach | Warrington, Heaton Moor, Newton-le-Willows |
| 1988–89 | 11 | Cockermouth | Macclesfield | Burnage, Leigh |
| 1989–90 | 11 | Manchester | Netherall | Moresby |
| 1990–91 | 11 | St Edward's Old Boys | Chester | Southport, Penrith |
| 1991–92 | 11 | Ashton-on-Mersey | Blackburn (Note: 3rd place Merseyside Police also promoted.) | No relegation (Note: There was no relegation at the end of 1991–92 season due to the restructuring of the northern leagues by the RFU for the following season, which would see North West 2 expand from 11 to 13 teams.) |
| 1992–93 | 13 | Oldershaw | Kirkby Lonsdale | South Liverpool, Workington |
Green backgrounds are promotion places.

=== North West 2 (1993–1996) ===
The creation of National 5 North for the 1993–94 season meant that North West 2 dropped from being a tier 8 league to a tier 9 league for the years that National 5 North was active.

North West 2 Honours
| Season | No of Teams | Champions | Runners–up | Relegated Teams |
| 1993–94 | 13 | Wilmslow | Netherall | Wirral, Rochdale, Warrington, Ormskirk |
| 1994–95 | 13 | Leigh | Penrith | Ruskin Park, St Edward's Old Boys |
| 1995–96 | 13 | Vagabonds | Aspull | Stockport, Wigan, Caldy, Rossendale, Merseyside Police, Windermere (Note: The creation of North West 3 for the following season, meant that six clubs were relegated from North West 2 to help populate the new division.) |
Green backgrounds are promotion places.

=== North West 2 (1996–2000) ===
The cancellation of National 5 North at the end of the 1995–96 season meant that North West 2 reverted to being a tier 8 league. Additionally, the creation of North West 3 at tier 9 for the 1996–97, meant that relegated teams dropped to this new league. At the end of the 1999–00 season a further restructure of the leagues saw North West 1, North West 2 and North West 3 cancelled, along with their counterparts North East 1, North East 2 and North East 3.

North West 2 Honours
| Season | No of Teams | Champions | Runners–up | Relegated Teams |
| 1996–97 | 10 | Old Aldwinians | Ashton-on-Mersey | Sandbach |
| 1997–98 | 10 | Caldy | Kirkby Lonsdale | Old Salians |
| 1998–99 | 10 | Stockport | Altrincham Kersal | Merseyside Police |
| 1999–00 | 10 | Workington (Note: As North West 1 was to be abolished there was no promotion - champions Workington were instead transferred to North Lancs/Cumbria.) | Northwich (Note: Due to cancellation of North West 2 Northwich, Wilmslow, Leigh, Wigan and Vagabonds were transferred to South Lancs/Cheshire 1, while Netherhall, Carlisle, Egremont and Fleetwood went into North Lancs/Cumbria.) | No relegation (Note: Due to the cancellation of North West 1, North West 2 and North West 3 there was no relegation.) |
Green backgrounds are promotion places.

== Number of league titles ==
- Ashton-on-Mersey (1)
- Caldy (1)
- Cockermouth (1)
- Leigh (1)
- Manchester (1)
- Old Aldwinians (1)
- Oldershaw (1)
- Sedgley Park (1)
- St Edward's Old Boys (1)
- Stockport (1)
- Vagabonds (1)
- Wilmslow (1)
- Workington (1)

== See also ==
- English Rugby Union Leagues
- English rugby union system
- Rugby union in England
