= North 1 West =

English rugby union league

- Current season or competition: 2019–20 North 1 West
- Sport: Rugby union
- Instituted: 1987; 39 years ago
- Number of teams: 14
- Country: England, Isle of Man
- Holders: Burnage (1st title) (2019–20) (promoted to North Premier)
- Most titles: Altrincham Kersal, Birkenhead Park, Vale of Lune (2 titles)
- Website: England RFU

North 1 West is a rugby union league at the sixth level within the English league system. The league is made up of teams from north west England and the Isle of Man; principally consisting of the English counties of Cheshire, Cumbria, Greater Manchester, Lancashire and Merseyside. The league was known as North Division 2 when it was first created back in 1987 and was a single division. It has since split into two regional leagues, with North West 1 and its compatriot North 1 East being the longest running versions of the division.

Promotion and relegation determine the makeup of the league each season, with the top team automatically moving into North Premier and the second-placed team entering into a play-off match with the second-placed team in North 1 East. Occasionally, depending on promotion and relegation, teams from either North 1 East and North 1 West may be required to compete in the opposite league to ensure that the number of teams in the east and west leagues remains at 14 teams each. Teams dropping from the league go into North 2 West.

== Teams 2021–22 ==
The teams competing in 2021-22 achieved their places in the league based on performances in 2019–20, the 'previous season' column in the table below refers to that season not 2020–21.

Team	Ground	Capacity	City/Area	Previous season
Altrincham Kersal	Stelfox Avenue		Timperley, Altrincham, Greater Manchester	3rd
Birkenhead Park	Upper Park	2,000	Birkenhead, Wirral	6th
Bowdon	Clay Lane		Timperley, Altrincham, Greater Manchester	12th
Broughton Park	Hough End		Chorlton-cum-Hardy, Manchester	11th
Carlisle	Rugby Ground, Warwick Road	1,500 (250 seats)	Carlisle, Cumbria	Relegated from North Premier (12th)
Douglas	Port-E-Chee		Douglas, Isle of Man	8th
Glossop	Hargate Hill Lane		Charlesworth, Glossop, Derbyshire	Promoted from North 2 West (runners-up)
Firwood Waterloo	St Anthony's Road	9,950 (950 seats)	Blundellsands, Merseyside	4th
Kendal	Mint Bridge Stadium	3,500 (258 seats)	Kendal, Cumbria	Level transfer from North 1 East (5th)
Manchester	Grove Park	4,000 (250 seats)	Cheadle Hulme, Stockport, Greater Manchester	Promoted from North 2 West (champions)
Penrith	Winters Park		Penrith, Cumbria	10th
Stockport	The Memorial Ground	500	Stockport, Greater Manchester	7th
Vale of Lune	Powder House Lane	4,000 (50 seats)	Lancaster, Lancashire	9th
Wilmslow	Memorial Ground		Wilmslow, Cheshire	5th

Locations of the 2021–22 North 1 West teams in NW England
Locations of the 2021–22 North 1 West teams in Greater Manchester

== 2020–21 ==
On 30 October 2020 the RFU announced that due to the coronavirus pandemic a decision had been taken to cancel Adult Competitive Leagues (National League 1 and below) for the 2020/21 season meaning North 1 West was not contested.

== Teams 2019–20 ==
Team	Ground	Capacity	City/Area	Previous season
Altrincham Kersal	Stelfox Avenue		Timperley, Altrincham, Greater Manchester	Promoted from Lancs/Cheshire 1 (champions)
Birkenhead Park	Upper Park	2,000	Birkenhead, Wirral	3rd
Bowdon	Clay Lane		Timperley, Altrincham, Greater Manchester	Promoted from Lancs/Cheshire 1 (playoff)
Broughton Park	Hough End		Chorlton-cum-Hardy, Manchester	5th
Burnage	Varley Park		Stockport, Greater Manchester	11th
Douglas	Port-E-Chee		Douglas, Isle of Man	6th
Keswick	Davidson Park		Keswick, Cumbria	Promoted from Cumbria 1 (champions)
Firwood Waterloo	St Anthony's Road	9,950 (950 seats)	Blundellsands, Merseyside	8th
Northwich	Moss Farm		Northwich, Cheshire	4th
Penrith	Winters Park		Penrith, Cumbria	10th
Stockport	The Memorial Ground	500	Stockport, Greater Manchester	7th
Vale of Lune	Powder House Lane	4,000 (50 seats)	Lancaster, Lancashire	Relegated from North Premier (13th)
Warrington	The Fortress		Walton, Warrington, Cheshire	9th
Wilmslow	Memorial Ground		Wilmslow, Cheshire	Relegated from North Premier (14th)

Locations of the 2019–20 North 1 West teams outside Greater Manchester

Locations of the 2019–20 North 1 West teams in Greater Manchester

== Original teams ==
When league rugby began in 1987 this was a single division containing the following teams from the north of England:

- Alnwick
- Aspatria
- Bradford & Bingley
- Davenport (Note: Davenport would be renamed as Stockport RUFC in 1992.)
- Halifax
- Huddersfield
- Lymm
- Manchester
- New Brighton
- Sandal
- Wilmslow

== North 1 West honours ==
=== North Division 2 (1987–1993) ===
The original North Division 2 was a tier 6 league with promotion up to North Division 1 and relegation down to either North East 1 or North West 1.

North Division 2
Season	No of teams	Champions	Runners–up	Relegated teams
1987–88	11	Aspatria	Halifax	Wilmslow, Manchester
1988–89	11	Bradford & Bingley	Middlesbrough	Davenport
1989–90	11	Rotherham	Widnes	No relegation
1990–91	11	Stockton	Sandal	New Brighton
1991–92	11	Wharfedale	Lymm	No relegation
1992–93	13	Manchester	Huddersfield	Sandbach
Green backgrounds are promotion places.

=== North Division 2 (1993–1996) ===
The creation of National 5 North for the 1993–94 season, meant that North Division 2 dropped from being a tier 6 league to a tier 7 league for the years that National 5 North was active.

North Division 2
Season	No of teams	Champions	Runners–up	Relegated teams
1993–94	13	York	West Park Bramhope	Carlise, Wigan, Lymm
1994–95	13	Macclesfield	Bridlington	Northwich
1995–96	13	New Brighton	Sedgley Park	Birkenhead Park, West Park St Helens, Old Crossleyeans, Hartlepool Rovers (Note: The introduction of a number of new leagues in the north for the 1996–97 season meant that more teams than normal were relegated between leagues to populate the new divisions.)
Green backgrounds are promotion places.

=== North Division 2 (1996–2000) ===
The cancellation of National 5 North at the end of the 1995–96 season meant that North Division 2 reverted to being a tier 6 league.

North Division 2 honours
Season	No of teams	Champions	Runners–up	Relegated teams
1996–97	12	Doncaster	Middlesbrough	Durham City
1997–98	12	Northern	Blaydon	Halifax
1998–99	12	Bradford & Bingley	Driffield	York, Percy Park
1999–00	12	Darlington Mowden Park	Chester	No relegation
Green backgrounds are promotion places.

=== North 2 West ===
For the 2000–01 season, North Division 2 was split into two regional divisions - North 2 East and North 2 West. While promotion continued up into North Division 1, the cancellation of the North West 1, North West 2 and North West 3 meant that relegation was to either North Lancashire/Cumbria or South Lancs/Cheshire 1.

North 2 West
Season	No of teams	Champions	Runners–up	Relegated teams
2000–01	12	West Park St Helens	Aldwinians	Widnes, Penrith, Blackburn
2001–02	12	Birkenhead Park	Vale of Lune	Caldy, Workington, Warrington
2002–03	12	Vale of Lune	Rochdale	Wilmslow, Aldwinians
2003–04	12	Altrincham Kersal	Caldy	Broughton Park, Rochdale, Wigton
2004–05	12	Caldy	Stockport	Blackburn, Aspull, Oldham
2005–06	12	Stockport	Winnington Park	Widnes, Rossendale, Fleetwood
2006–07	12	Liverpool St Helens	Lymm	Stoke-on-Trent, Wilmslow, Bowdon
2007–08	12	Chester	Stockport	Tyldesley, Winnington Park, Vale of Lune
2008–09	12	Rochdale	Rossendale	No relegation due to league restructure (Note: The division would be renamed North Division 1 West for the next season and along with the whole national restructure of the league system by the RFU lead to mass changes at all levels.)
Green backgrounds are promotion places.

=== North 1 West ===
For the 2009–10 season the division would be renamed North 1 West as part of wholesale national restructure of the league system by the RFU leading to mass changes at all levels including in the north.

North 1 West
Season	No of teams	Champions	Runners–up	Relegated teams
2009–10	14	Lymm	Northwich	Aspatria, Blackburn, Tyldesley
2010–11	14	Altrincham Kersal	Burnage	West Park St Helens, Kirkby Lonsdale, New Brighton
2011–12	14	Sandbach	Liverpool St Helens	Aspatria, Broughton Park, Wigton
2012–13	14	Sale FC	Liverpool St Helens	Fleetwood, Manchester, Anselmians
2013–14	14	Wirral	Birkenhead Park	Altrincham Kersal, Leigh, Liverpool St Helens
2014–15	14	Birkenhead Park	Kirkby Lonsdale	Wigton, New Brighton, Bolton
2015–16	14	Kendal	Kirkby Lonsdale	Broughton Park, Widnes, Carlisle
2016–17	14	Kirkby Lonsdale	Birkenhead Park	Eccles, Leigh, West Park St Helens
2017–18	13 (Note: The division started with 14 teams but St Benedicts decided to quit the league in April 2018 due to fixture buildup and issues with their home pitch. They would automatically be relegated.)	Vale of Lune	Wilmslow	Rochdale, Altrincham Kersal (Note: St Benedicts also relegated due to quitting the league - all league results involving the club were wiped out.)
2018–19	14	Carlisle	Blackburn	De La Salle, Anselmians, Manchester
2019–20	14	Burnage	Northwich	Warrington, Keswick
2020–21	14			
Green backgrounds are promotion places.

== Promotion play-offs ==
Since the 2000–01 season there has been a play-off between the runners-up of North 1 East and North 1 West for the third and final promotion place to North Premier. The team with the superior league record has home advantage in the tie. At the end of the 2019–20 season the North 1 East have been the most successful with thirteen wins to the North 1 West teams six; and the home team has won promotion on fifteen occasions compared to the away teams five.

North 1 East v North 1 West promotion play-off results
Season	Home team	Score	Away team	Venue	Attendance
2000–01	Darlington (E)	49-0	Aldwinians (W)	Blackwell Meadowns, Darlington, County Durham	
2001–02	Huddersfield (E)	26-10	Vale of Lune (W)	Lockwood Park, Huddersfield, West Yorkshire	
2002–03	Sheffield (E)	32-15	Rochdale (W)	Abbeydale Park, Dore, Sheffield, South Yorkshire	
2003–04	Middlesbrough (E)	21-13	Caldy (W)	Acklam Park, Middlesbrough, North Yorkshire	
2004–05	Huddersfield (E)	22-13	Stockport (W)	Lockwood Park, Huddersfield, West Yorkshire	
2005–06	Beverley (E)	21-16	Winnington Park (W)	Beaver Park, Beverley, East Riding of Yorkshire	
2006–07	Sheffield Tigers (E)	50-10	Lymm (W)	Dore Moor, Dore, Sheffield, South Yorkshire	
2007–08	Durham City (E)	13-18	Stockport (W)	Hollow Drift, Durham, County Durham	
2008–09	Old Crossleyans (E)	25-31	Rossendale (W)	Broomfield Avenue, Halifax, West Yorkshire	
2009–10	Sandal (E)	30-22	Northwich (W)	Milnthorpe Green, Sandal Magna, Wakefield, West Yorkshire	
2010–11	Percy Park (E)	26-27	Burnage (W)	Preston Avenue, North Shields, Tyne and Wear	
2011–12	Percy Park (E)	18-12	Liverpool St Helens (W)	Preston Avenue, North Shields, Tyne and Wear	500
2012–13	Liverpool St Helens (W)	17-28	Morley (E)	Moss Lane, St Helens, Merseyside	
2013–14	Birkenhead Park (W)	19-29	Huddersfield Y.M.C.A. (E)	Upper Park, Birkenhead, Merseyside	
2014–15	Kirkby Lonsdale (W)	29-35	Sheffield (E)	Underley Park, Kirkby Lonsdale, Cumbria	1,000
2015–16	Kirkby Lonsdale (W)	33-38 (aet)	Morley (E)	Underley Park, Kirkby Lonsdale, Cumbria	
2016–17	Birkenhead Park (W)	29-21	Penrith (E)	Upper Park, Birkenhead, Merseyside	
2017–18	Driffield (E)	21-24	Wilmslow (W)	Show Ground, Driffield, East Riding of Yorkshire	
2018–19	Blackburn (W)	17-7	Scarborough (E)	Ramsgreave Drive, Blackburn, Lancashire	
2019–20	Cancelled due to COVID-19 pandemic in the United Kingdom. Best ranked runner up - Northwich (W) - promoted instead.				
2020–21					
Green background is the promoted team. E = North 1 East (formerly North 2 East) and W = North 1 West (formerly North 2 West)

== Number of league titles ==
- Altrincham Kersal (2)
- Birkenhead Park (2)
- Vale of Lune (2)
- Aspatria (1) (Note: Aspatria's title was won when league was a single division known as North Division 2.)
- Bradford & Bingley (1) (Note: Bradford & Bingley's title was won when league was a single division known as North Division 2.)
- Burnage (1)
- Caldy (1)
- Carlisle (1)
- Chester (1)
- Darlington Mowden Park (Note: Darlington Mowden Park's title was won when league was a single division known as North Division 2.)
- Doncaster (1) (Note: Doncaster's title was won when league was a single division known as North Division 2.)
- Kendal (1)
- Kirkby Lonsdale (1)
- Liverpool St Helens (1)
- Lymm (1)
- Macclesfield (1) (Note: Manchester's title was won when league was a single division known as North Division 2.)
- Manchester (1) (Note: Manchester's title was won when league was a single division known as North Division 2.)
- New Brighton (1) (Note: New Brighton's title was won when league was a single division known as North Division 2.)
- Northern (1) (Note: Northern's title was won when league was a single division known as North Division 2.)
- Rochdale (1)
- Rotherham (1) (Note: Rotherham's title was won when league was a single division known as North Division 2.)
- Sandbach (1)
- Sale FC (1)
- Stockport (1)
- Stockton (1) (Note: Stockton's title was won when league was a single division known as North Division 2.)
- West Park St Helens (1)
- Wharfedale (1) (Note: Wharfedale's title was won when league was a single division known as North Division 2.)
- Wirral (1)
- York (1) (Note: York's title was won when league was a single division known as North Division 2.)

== See also ==
- Cheshire RFU
- Cumbria RU
- Lancashire RFU
- English rugby union system
- Rugby union in England
