= North West 1 =

English rugby union league

- Sport: Rugby Union
- Instituted: 1987; 39 years ago
- Ceased: 2000; 26 years ago
- Country: England
- Website: clubs.rfu.com

North West 1 (not to be confused with North 1 West) was an English Rugby Union league at the seventh tier of the domestic competition and was available to teams in North West England. Promoted teams moved up to North 2 West, while relegated teams dropped to North West 2. The division was abolished at the end of the 1999–00 season due to RFU restructuring with teams being transferred to either North 2 West or their relevant regional leagues, such as South Lancs/Cheshire 1 or North Lancs/Cumbria.

== Original teams ==
When league rugby began in 1987 this division contained the following teams:

- Blackburn
- Carlisle
- Caldy
- Chester
- Egremont
- Mid-Cheshire College (Note: Mid-Cheshire College were renamed to Northwich RUFC from the 1990–91 season onward.)
- Netherhall
- Rochdale
- Southport
- Wigan
- Wirral

== North West 1 Honours ==
=== North West 1 (1987–1993) ===
The original North West 1 was a tier 7 league with promotion up to North Division 2 and relegation down to North West 2.

North West 1 Honours
Season	No of Teams	Champions	Runners–up	Relegated Teams
1987–88	11	Carlisle	Wirral	Blackburn, Netherall, Southport
1988–89	11	Wigan	Egremont	Wilmslow, Manchester
1989–90	11	Sandbach	Egremont	Chester
1990–91	11	Northwich	Manchester	Rochdale
1991–92	11	Manchester	Macclesfield	No relegation (Note: There was no relegation at the end of 1991–92 season due to the restructuring of the northern leagues by the RFU for the following season, which would see North West 1 expand from 11 to 13 teams.)
1992–93	13	Macclesfield	New Brighton	Egremont, Wirral
Green backgrounds are promotion places.

=== North West 1 (1993–1996) ===
The creation of National 5 North for the 1993–94 season meant that North West 1 dropped from being a tier 7 league to a tier 8 league for the years that National 5 North was active.

North West 1 Honours
Season	No of Teams	Champions	Runners–up	Relegated Teams
1993–94	13	New Brighton	Oldershaw	Kirkby Lions, Merseyside Police, St Edward's Old Boys
1994–95	13	Sedgley Park	Lymm	Wigan, Stockport
1995–96	13	Lymm	Penrith	Multiple teams (Note: Due to restructuring caused by the creation of North West 3, five clubs were relegated into North West 2, including Sandbach, Northwich, Carlisle, Ashton-on-Mersey and Leigh. Bottom place Cockermouth were also relegated, but this time two levels down into the new North West 3.)
Green backgrounds are promotion places.

=== North West 1 (1996–2000) ===
The cancellation of National 5 North at the end of the 1995–96 season meant that North West 1 reverted to being a tier 7 league. At the end of the 1999–00 season a further restructure of the leagues saw North West 1, North West 2 and North West 3 cancelled, along with their counterparts North East 1, North East 2 and North East 3.

North West 1 Honours
Season	No of Teams	Champions	Runners–up	Relegated Teams
1996–97	10	Blackburn	West Park St Helens	Netherall
1997–98	10	Chester	West Park St Helens	Wilmslow
1998–99	10	Aldwinians	West Park St Helens	Vagabonds
1999–00	10	West Park St Helens	Stockport (Note: As this was the last season for North West 1 a larger than usual number of teams were promoted to North 2 West.)	Ashton-on-Mersey (Note: Due to North West 2 being abolished Ashton-on-Mersey, Aspull, Oldershaw and Birkenhead Park were relegated/transferred to South Lancs/Cheshire 1 while Kirkby Lonsdale went into North Lancs/Cumbria.)
Green backgrounds are promotion places.

== Number of league titles ==
- Aldwinians (1)
- Blackburn (1)
- Chester (1)
- Carlisle (1)
- Lymm (1)
- Macclesfield (1)
- Manchester (1)
- New Brighton (1)
- Northwich (1)
- Sandbach (1)
- Sedgley Park (1)
- West Park St Helens (1)
- Wigan (1)

== See also ==
- English Rugby Union Leagues
- English rugby union system
- Rugby union in England
