= Sale FC Rugby Club =

Rugby union club in Cheshire, England

(England) Sale
- Full name: Sale FC Rugby Club
- Union: Cheshire RFU
- Founded: 1861; 165 years ago
- Location: Sale, Greater Manchester, England
- Region: Cheshire
- Ground: Heywood Road (Capacity: 3,387)
- Chairman: Dr Scott Bambrick
- President: James Hourihan
- Coach: Jonathan Keep
- Captain: Andy Hughes
- League: National League 1
- 2025–26: 5th
Team kit

Official website
- salefc.com

Sale FC is a semi-professional rugby union club based at Heywood Road in Sale, Greater Manchester, England. They play in National League 1 following promotion from National League 2 North at the end of the 2017–18 season. Premiership club Sale Sharks is the professional offshoot of Sale FC.

== History ==
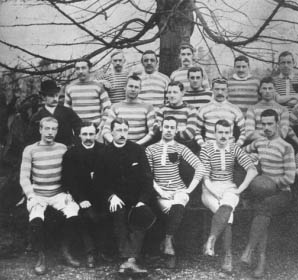
An early Sale FC team

Formed by a team of sportsmen drawn mainly from Sale Cricket Club, Sale Football Club was founded in 1861 and is the fifth oldest surviving rugby club. In the early days of the club, rules were usually deemed unnecessary and those that were enforced were often made up on the spot. As the game began to evolve, however, the need for specified regulations became apparent and in 1865 the Minute Book was created stipulating the ten rules to be followed by all players. This is reputedly the world's oldest existing rugby rule book and a much treasured possession. Games were originally played on either a rented portion of Sale Cricket Club or on fields owned by local farmers. In 1905, the club bought a field at the end of Heywood Road.

Sale FC have featured many prominent international and county players. Pat Davies became their first England international in 1927 and the 1930s saw an international backline of Hal Sever (England wing), Claude Davey and Wilf Wooller (Wales centres) and Ken Fyfe (Scotland wing). Fran Cotton, Steve Smith, Dewi Morris, Richard Trickey and Jason Robinson also played at Sale. Eric Evans played for and captained England as hooker.For many years there was an Eric Evans Stand.

In 1936, Sale were invited to take part in the Middlesex Sevens Cup and went on to win the competition.

Before World War II, an increase in membership meant that the club had almost outgrown facilities at Heywood Road and an additional site on Woodbourne Road was purchased. Initially this was meant to be a training ground for the junior team, but there were talks to eventually relocate the rest of the club there too, but when war was over it was instead decided to focus efforts on the redevelopment of Heywood Road. Land was sold to fund the project and the ground gradually began to evolve. A new clubhouse was built, the old bath house replaced by squash courts, changing facilities improved, floodlights installed and the commemorative Jim Birtles Stand erected.

== Current season ==
2026–27 National League 1 table
Pos	Team	Pld	W	D	L	PF	PA	PD	TB	LB	Pts	Qualification
1	Plymouth Albion	5	5	0	0	292	57	+235	5	0	25	Promotion place
2	Tonbridge Juddians	5	5	0	0	216	203	+13	5	0	25	Promotion play-off
3	Sale FC	5	4	0	1	231	141	+90	4	1	21	Promotion play-off
4	Camborne	5	4	0	1	163	144	+19	4	0	20	
5	Bishop's Stortford	5	3	0	2	184	170	+14	4	0	16	
6	Birmingham Moseley	5	3	0	2	148	191	−43	4	0	16	
7	Leeds Tykes	5	2	0	3	179	121	+58	3	3	14	
8	Rosslyn Park	5	2	0	3	178	193	−15	4	1	13	
9	Dings Crusaders	5	1	1	3	203	199	+4	5	2	13	
10	Bury St Edmunds	5	2	0	3	158	218	−60	4	0	12	
11	Rams	5	1	1	3	129	177	−48	4	1	11	Relegation play-off
12	Sheffield	5	1	0	4	98	156	−58	3	2	9	Relegation place
13	London Scottish	5	1	0	4	141	211	−70	3	1	8	Relegation place
14	Cambridge	5	0	0	5	149	288	−139	4	3	7	Relegation place

Updated to match(es) played on 5 June 2026. Source: National League Rugby
Rules for classification: If teams are level at any stage, tiebreakers are applied in the following order:
1. Number of matches won
2. Number of matches drawn
3. Difference between points for and against
4. Total number of points for
5. Aggregate number of points scored in matches between tied teams
6. Number of matches won excluding the first match, then the second and so on until the tie is settled

== Facilities ==
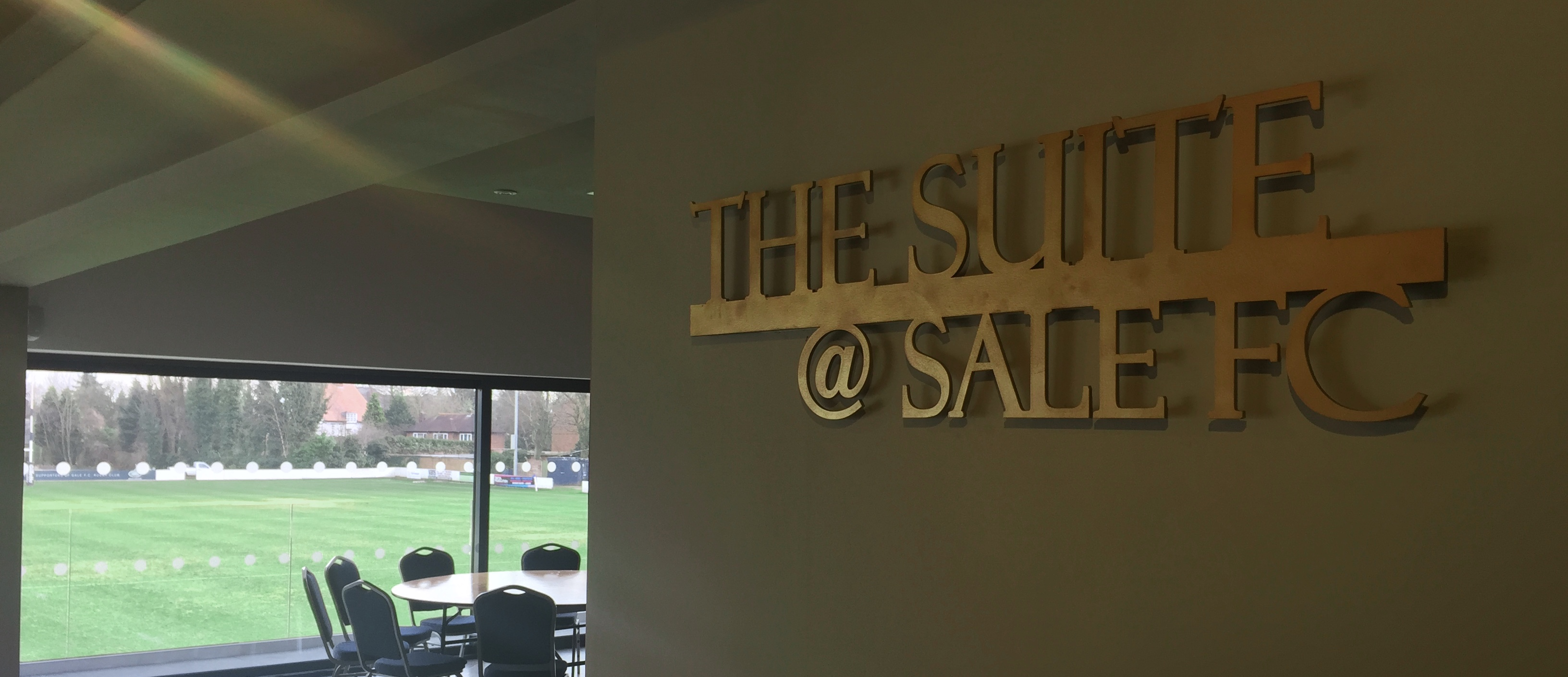
The Suite @Sale FC

In December 2017 at their home game against Sedgley Tigers, Sale FC opened their Suite @Sale hospitality suite. This new suite overlooking the main pitch with sliding windows onto the balcony, seats 190 for meals in the main room, 24 people in the Executive Suite and has two bars. There is also a bar downstairs named after Steve Smith "Smithys". The new development includes a new gymnasium and a martial arts facility.

== Training ground ==
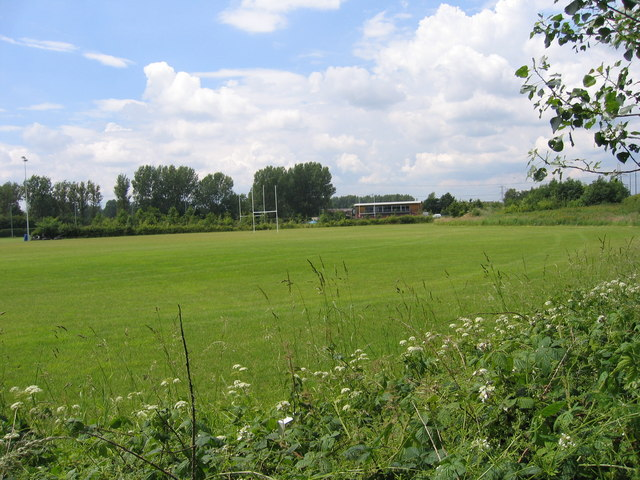
Carrington High Performance Centre

Sale FC Rugby also own the Sale FC Rugby Training ground on Carrington Lane. This high performance facility has four pitches, one of which is floodlit and a training resource area including dining room, performance analysis suite and it is also where Minis and Juniors train on Sunday mornings and Thursday evenings. This is also the home venue for Sale FC 1861, Sale FC Vikings and Sale FC Senior Colts. The gymnasium provides rehab, strength and condition facilities and changing rooms. Recently the club house has had a complete refurbish and now contains a bar and a cafe.

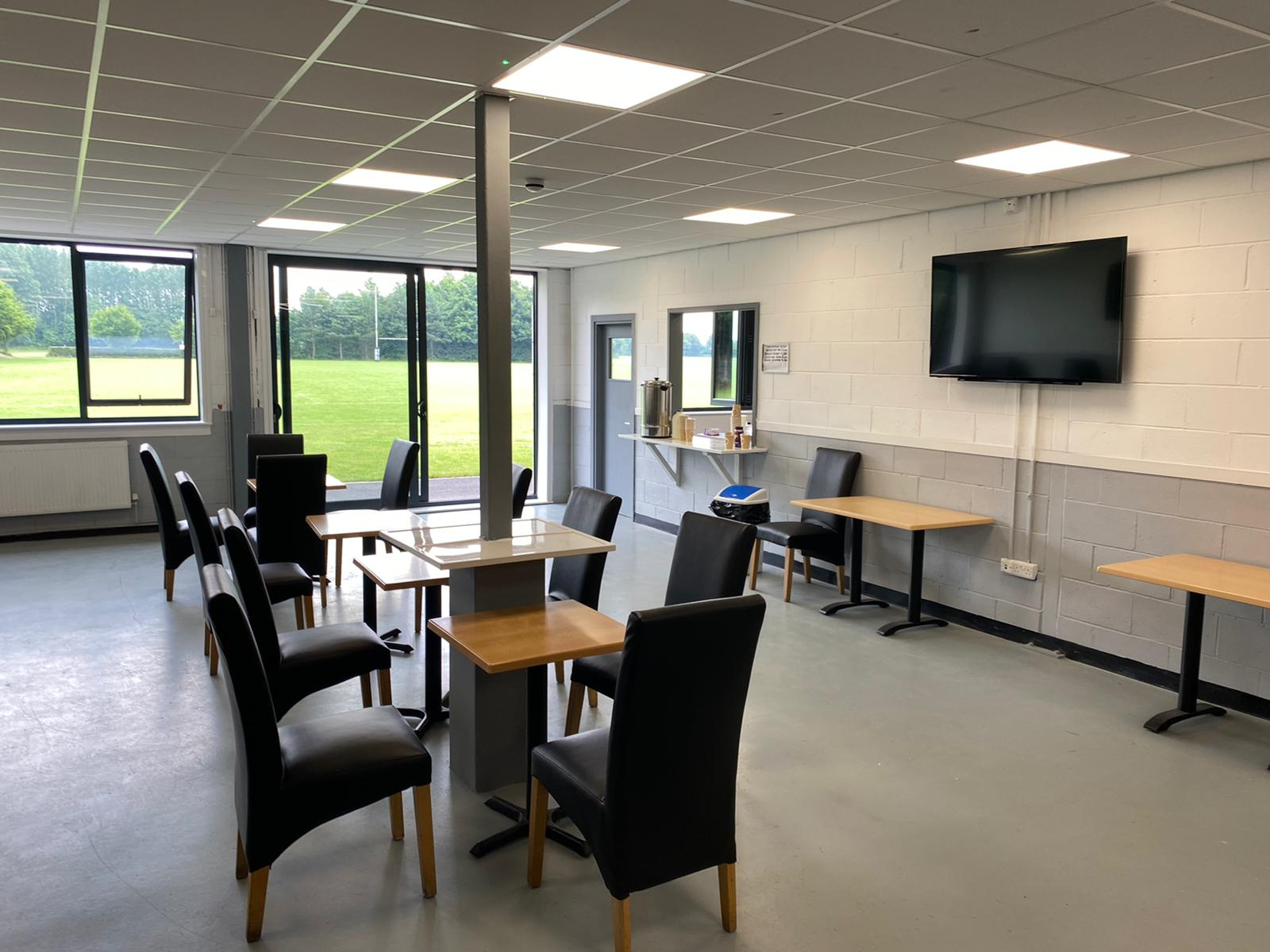
Cafe Sale FC Rugby Training Ground

== Mascot ==
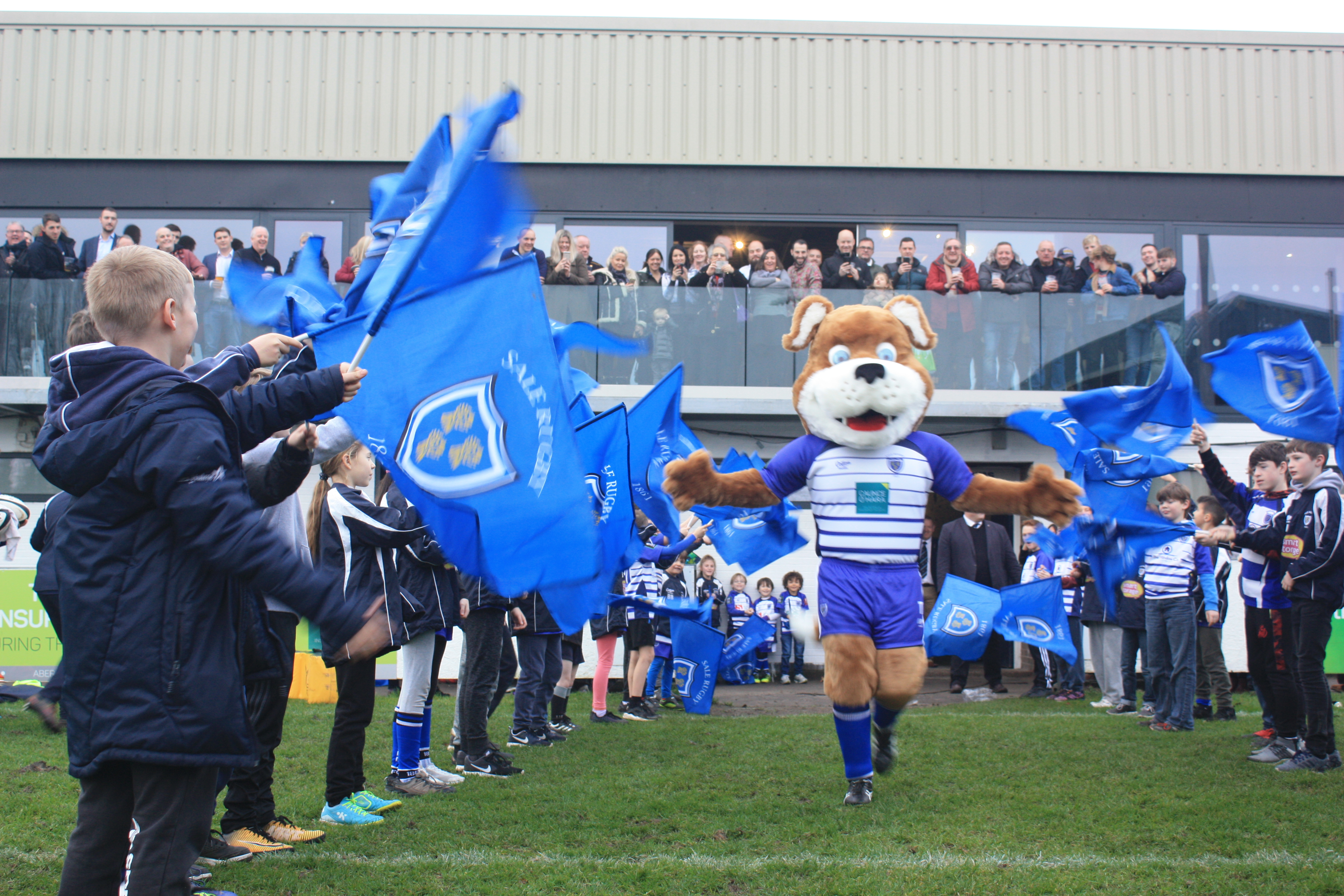
The unveiling of Trickey the Mutt, 23 December 2017

On 23 December 2017 the club unveiled a new mascot, Trickey the Mutt.

== Teams ==
Sale FC currently has four senior teams

- Sale FC 1st Team playing in National One
- Sale FC Vikings new entry to the leagues 2022–23 season
- Sale FC 1861 women's team playing in Championship North Two
- Sale FC Chargers Touch Rugby Team

Sale FC also has

- Sale FC Senior Colts
- Sale FC Junior Colts
- More than 350 Juniors and Minis

== Touch Rugby ==
In the 2022–23 season, Sale FC have added a touch rugby team to their club. Manchester Chargers in the search for a new home have joined forces with Sale FC to form Sale FC Chargers. Home games and training are at Sale FC Training Centre Carrington Lane.

== Honours ==
Old amateur club (pre Sale Sharks)

- Middlesex Sevens winners: 1936
- Glengarth Sevens Davenport Plate winners (2): 1968, 1985
- Cheshire Cup winners (17): 1970, 1973, 1974, 1975, 1976, 1977, 1978, 1979, 1980, 1981, 1982, 1983, 1984, 1985, 1986, 1987, 1997
- Glengarth Sevens Main Event Champions: 1978
- Courage League National Division Two champions: 1993–94

Modern amateur club (post Sale Sharks)

- South Lancs/Cheshire 4 champions: 2003–04
- South Lancs/Cheshire 3 champions: 2004–05
- South Lancs/Cheshire 2 champions: 2005–06
- Cheshire Plate winners: 2006
- South Lancs/Cheshire 1 champions: 2011–12
- Cheshire Bowl winners: 2012
- North Division 1 West champions: 2012–13
- Cheshire Vase winners: 2013
- Cheshire Cup winners: 2014 2019
- National 3 North champions: 2014–15
- National League 2 North champions: 2017–18
