= Sheffield Tigers RUFC =

English rugby union club, based in Sheffield

(England) Sheffield Tigers
- Full name: Sheffield Tigers Rugby Union Football Club
- Union: Yorkshire RFU
- Founded: 1932; 94 years ago
- Location: Dore, Sheffield, South Yorkshire, England
- Ground: Dore Moor (Capacity: 1,000)
- Chairman: Vacant
- President: Rory Earley
- Coach: Glen Kenworthy
- Captain: Joe Fitzsimons
- League: National League 2 North
- 2025–26: 8th
Team kit

Official website
- sheffieldtigers.co.uk

Sheffield Tigers Rugby Football Club is a rugby union team based in Sheffield, South Yorkshire, England. They currently play in the fourth tier of the English rugby union league system, National League 2 North, and are based at Dore Moor, Hathersage Road, Sheffield. The club runs three senior teams – the Mens 1st XV, Womens 1st XV playing at National Level 3 and Mens 2nd XV playing in Counties 2 Yorkshire B division after a decision was made in 2026 to introduce 2XVs into the league structure. The junior section starts at under-7's up to a colts XV.

== History ==
Formed in 1932 they celebrated their 75th season of rugby in 2007. Since league rugby began they were long standing members of Yorkshire 2, managing to avoid either promotion or relegation for the first dozen or so years of the leagues.

The arrival of former England and Halifax RLFC David Holmes spearheaded a new era and the club reached the final of the Tetley Bitter Vase at Twickenham in 2000, securing a 20–11 win over favourites Bank of England RUFC. Despite finishing second, a restructure of the leagues meant that they remained in Yorkshire 2; as all ten clubs below them were relegated! Promotion the following year was accompanied by the club's first Yorkshire Shield win over Scarborough and the 'Tigers' stayed in Yorkshire 1 for two seasons before a disastrous campaign in 2002–03 saw them relegated back to Yorkshire 2.

The arrival of coach Richard Selkirk and a host of new players saw Tigers promoted at the second time of asking in 2004–05, a year that also saw a second Vase win at Twickenham, this time over Solihull after a tumultuous semi-final win at Sidmouth.

Further success followed in 2005–06 with the Yorkshire 1 title captured, and at their first attempt Tigers made it three promotions in a row in 2006–07 with a play-off win over North 2 West rivals Lymm to book their place in North 1 for 2007–08. Three seasons later the club gained promotion from this league, now known as National 3 North, via a play-off victory over Chester.

== Ground ==
The Tigers home ground, Dore Moor, is situated on the northern outskirts of Dore, to the south of Sheffield with direct access to the A625. There is a club house and three pitches, with the capacity around the main pitch being approximately 1,000 (all standing).

== Honours ==
- Tetley/Powergen Junior Vase winners (2): 1999–00, 2004–05
- Yorkshire Shield winners: 2000–01
- South Yorkshire Trophy winners (3): 2003–04, 2004–05, 2005–06
- Yorkshire League 2 champions: 2004–05
- Yorkshire League 1 champions: 2005–06
- North 2 (east v west) promotion play-off winners: 2006–07
- National League 3 (north v midlands) promotion play-off winner: 2010–11
- National League 3 North champions: 2015–16

== Current standings ==
2026–27 National League 2 North table
Pos	Team	Pld	W	D	L	PF	PA	PD	TB	LB	Pts	Qualification
1	Sedgley Park	8	8	0	0	420	111	+309	8	0	40	Promotion place
2	Darlington Mowden Park	8	6	0	2	388	159	+229	7	1	32	Promotion play-off
3	Chester	8	6	0	2	315	214	+101	6	1	31	
4	Tynedale	8	6	0	2	252	221	+31	6	0	30	
5	Hull Ionians	7	5	0	2	276	220	+56	7	1	28	
6	Preston Grasshoppers	8	5	0	3	295	235	+60	6	1	27	
7	Harrogate	8	3	1	4	204	328	−124	6	0	20	
8	Sheffield Tigers	8	3	0	5	225	229	−4	5	3	20	
9	Fylde	8	3	0	5	198	253	−55	5	0	17	
10	Billingham	8	3	0	5	222	350	−128	5	0	17	
11	Huddersfield	8	2	1	5	202	362	−160	5	1	16	
12	Heath	8	2	0	6	188	282	−94	4	1	13	Relegation play-off
13	Otley	7	1	0	6	183	292	−109	4	1	9	Relegation place
14	Wharfedale	8	1	0	7	203	315	−112	5	0	9	Relegation place

Updated to match(es) played on 2 September 2026. Source: National League Rugby
Rules for classification: If teams are level at any stage, tiebreakers are applied in the following order:
1. Number of matches won
2. Number of matches drawn
3. Difference between points for and against
4. Total number of points for
5. Aggregate number of points scored in matches between tied teams
6. Number of matches won excluding the first match, then the second and so on until the tie is settled
