= Frank Handford =

British Lions & England international rugby union player

- Born: Frank Gordon Handford; September 1884 Eccles, Greater Manchester, England
- Died: unknown
- Height: 5 ft 11 in (180 cm)
- Weight: 168 lb (76 kg)
- School: The Leys School

Rugby union career
- Position: Flanker
Senior career
Years	Team	Apps	(Points)
1908/09	Kersal		
1909 onwards	Manchester Football Club		
International career
Years	Team	Apps	(Points)
1909	England	4	
1910	British Isles	3	

Frank Handford was an English rugby union international who played on four occasions for his country and was part of the first official British Isles team that toured South Africa in 1910.

== Early life ==
Frank Gordon Handford was born in 1884 in Eccles, Lancashire, the son of Joseph Handford, a tea merchant who hailed from Stockport, Cheshire, and his second wife Annie Elizabeth Walker of Lowestoft, Suffolk, England whom he married in 1882. Frank had a number of older siblings from hisn father's first marriage. He lived in Barton upon Irwell before he went to The Leys School in Cambridge as a boarder. In 1906 he enrolled for an agricultural course at the Aspatria Agricultural College, where after two years of theoretical and practical study he left with an award of the Diploma of the College.

== Rugby career ==
Handford played for Aspartria during the 1906/7/8 seasons and for Kersal Football Club (which would later become Altrincham Kersal RFC) in the 1908/09 season and was shown in the Fixture Card as Vice-Captain for the season. He later moved on to Manchester Football Club (later renamed Manchester Rugby Club). He was a stalwart of the Lancashire County side playing from 1906 through till the return season of 1918 after the Great War. During his period of study at the Aspatria Agricultural College he played Rugby union for Cumberland County on four occasions.

F G Handford with the British Isles team in 1910

Handford made his Test debut for England vs Wales at Cardiff on 16 January 1909. He played in a further 3 matches for his country in that Five Nations championship. His last Test for England was a Calcutta Cup match against Scotland at Richmond on 20 March 1909. In 1910 he was selected for the first official British tour to South Africa (in that it was sanctioned and selected by the four Home Nations official governing bodies). He played on all three tests.

== First World War ==
He served in the Cheshire Yeomanry, Machine Gun Corps during the First World War rising to the rank of sergeant.

== Personal life ==
On 11 November 1915 Frank Handford married Mildred Honor Fiddy in Great Yarmouth. Perhaps due to his earlier Lions Tour in 1910, he is recorded as having emigrated to South Africa at some time after 1919.
