= Cheshire Rugby Football Union =

UK rugby union governing body

(England) Cheshire RFU
- Full name: Cheshire Rugby Football Union
- Union: RFU
- Founded: 1880; 146 years ago
- Region: Cheshire; Isle of Man
Team kit

Official website
- www.cheshirerfu.co.uk

The Cheshire Rugby Football Union (CRFU) is a rugby union governing body in the historic county of Cheshire and the Isle of Man. The union is the constituent body of the Rugby Football Union (RFU) for Cheshire. The CRFU administers and organises rugby union clubs and competitions in the county and administers the Cheshire county rugby representative teams.

== Cheshire senior men's county team ==
Honours

- County Championship Cup winners (3): 1950, 1961, 1998
- County Championship Plate winners (2): 2006, 2009

== Affiliated clubs ==
There are currently 52 clubs affiliated with the union, with teams at both senior and junior level.

- Acton Nomads
- Altrincham Kersal
- Anselmians
- Ashton-on-Mersey
- Birkenhead Park
- Bowdon
- Caldy
- Capenhurst
- Carrington
- Castletown (I.O.M.)
- Chester
- Christleton
- Congleton
- Crewe & Nantwich
- Douglas (I.O.M.)
- Dukinfield
- Ellesmere Port
- Helsby
- Holmes Chapel
- Hoylake
- Knutsford
- Lymm
- Macclesfield
- Manchester Village Spartans
- Marple
- Manchester Metropolitan University
- Moore RFC
- New Brighton
- North Wales Exiles
- North West Mercenaries
- Northwich
- Old Birkonians
- Oldershaw
- Oswestry
- Oxton Parkonians
- Port Sunlight
- Prenton
- Ramsey (I.O.M.)
- Reaseheath College
- Sale FC
- Sale Sharks
- Sandbach
- Southern Nomads (I.O.M.)
- Stockport
- University of Chester
- University of Law
- Vagabonds (I.O.M.)
- Wallasey
- Western Vikings (I.O.M.)
- Wilmslow
- Winnington Park
- Wirral

== County club competitions ==
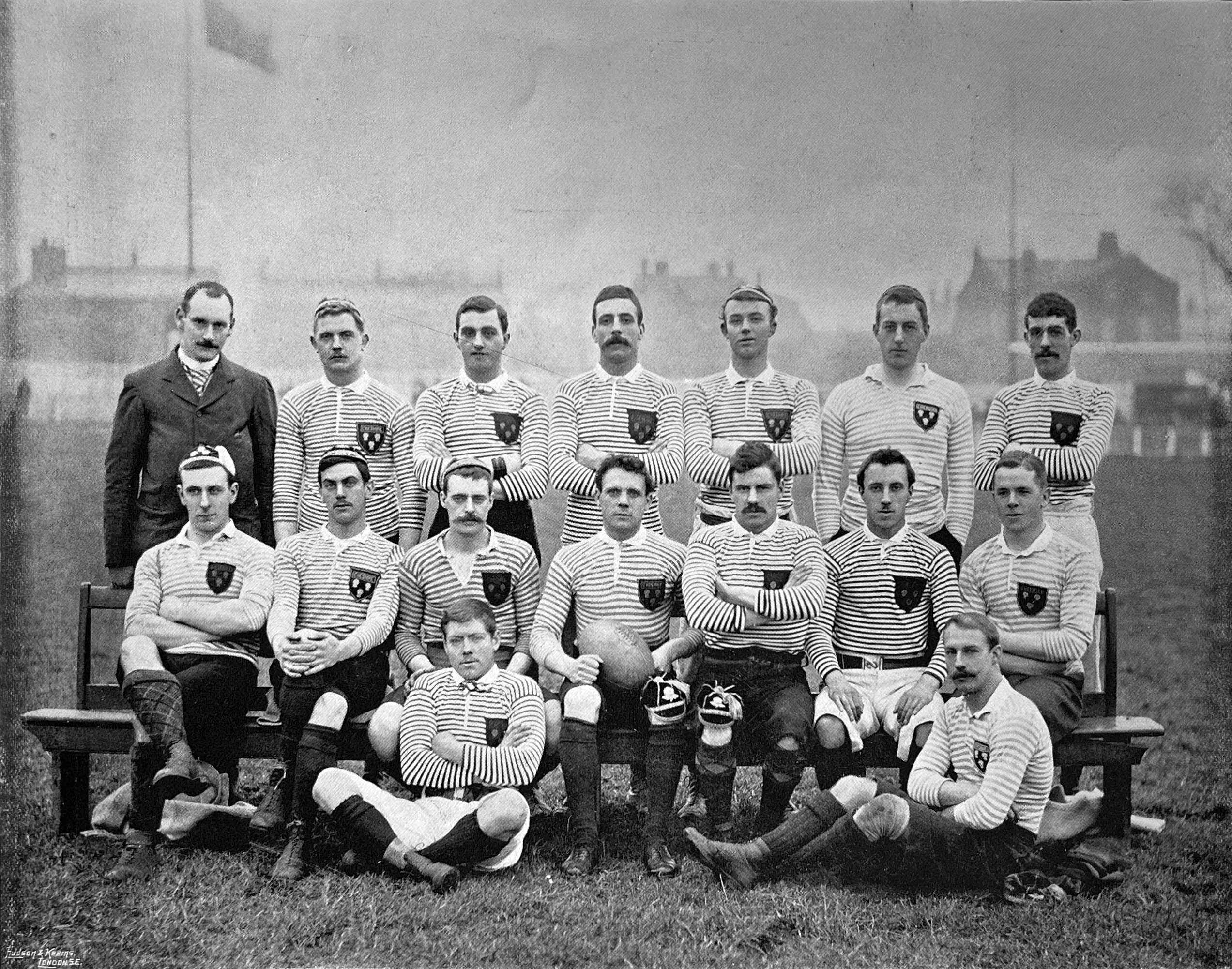
Cheshire team of 1894

The Cheshire RFU currently helps run the following club competitions for club sides based in Cheshire, parts of Merseyside and Manchester, and the Isle of Man:

=== Leagues ===
All leagues are by both the Cheshire RFU and Lancashire RFU and feature clubs based in Cheshire, Merseyside, Lancashire, Greater Manchester and the Isle of Man.

- Lancs/Cheshire 1 - league ranked at tier 7 of the English rugby union system
- South Lancs/Cheshire 2 - tier 8 league
- Lancs/Cheshire Division 3 - tier 9 league

=== Cups ===
- Cheshire Cup - first played for in 1877 open to clubs playing at tiers 4-5 of the English rugby union league system
- Cheshire Vase - founded in 2005 open to clubs playing at tiers 6-7
- Cheshire Bowl - founded in 2009, open to clubs playing in tier 8
- Cheshire Plate - founded in 1980, open to clubs in tier 9

=== Discontinued competitions ===
- South Lancs/Cheshire 4 - a tier 10 league for regional sides that was discontinued at the end of the 2008-09 season
- Cheshire (South) / Merseyside (West) - tier 8 leagues for sides from Cheshire and Merseyside that briefly replaced South Lancs/Cheshire 2 and South Lancs/Cheshire 3 for the 2015-16 season
- South Lancs/Cheshire 3 - tier 9 league for regional sides that was abolished in 2017
- North West 1 - tier 7 league for Lancashire, Cheshire and Cumbria clubs that was abolished in 2000
- North West 2 - tier 8 league for Lancashire, Cheshire and Cumbria clubs that was abolished in 2000
- North West 3 - tier 9 league for Lancashire, Cheshire and Cumbria clubs that was abolished in 2000

== See also ==
- Northern Division
- English rugby union system
