= Dewi Morris =

British Lions & England international rugby union player

Colin Dewi Morris (born 9 February 1964) is a former rugby union footballer who played scrum half for England.

Morris was born in Crickhowell, Brecknockshire, Wales, and graduated from Crewe & Alsager College. He made his England debut in 1988, as a twenty-four year old, against Australia, scoring a try as part of England's victory. He was dropped in 1990 in favour of Richard Hill, but returned to the England side in 1992 and was the Lions scrum-half in 1993. Early on in his playing career, Dewi played for Winnington Park Rugby Football Club in Cheshire. Dewi also played for Liverpool St. Helens, winning the Lancashire Cup, before moving on to play for local rivals, Orrell.

He was England's first-choice scrum-half at the 1995 World Cup in South Africa. He retired from international rugby after England lost to France in the tournament's third place play-off, having won 26 caps in total. However, he came out of retirement after professionalism to play for a season for Sale, helping them reach the final of the Pilkington Cup. After retiring he now appears regularly as a rugby union pundit/commentator on Sky Sports where he appears with former England international (and Wales schoolboy international) Stuart Barnes and former England and Lions centre Will Greenwood.
