= Wilmslow RUFC =

English rugby union club, based in Wilmslow, Cheshire

(England) Wilmslow
- Union: Cheshire RFU
- Founded: 1884; 142 years ago
- Location: Wilmslow, Cheshire, England
- Ground: Memorial Ground
- Chairman: Ric Noden
- League: North 1 West
- 2019–20: 5th

Official website
- www.pitchero.com/clubs/wilmslow

Wilmslow Rugby Club is an English rugby union club based in Wilmslow, Cheshire. The first XV team presently competes in North 1 West, which is a level six league within the English rugby union system. This follows their relegation from North Premier at the conclusion of the 2018–19 season.

== History ==
In 2018, Wilmslow reached the national levels of the sport for the first time by achieving promotion through winning the 2017-18 North 1 East/North 1 West promotion play-off. Nonetheless, this transition proved to be challenging. The club concluded at the bottom of the North Premier league and subsequently faced immediate relegation back into North 1 West.

== Club honours ==
- Cheshire Cup winners: 1971–72
- North West 2 champions: 1993–94
- Cheshire Plate winners: 1994–95
- South Lancs/Cheshire 1 champions (2): 2001–02, 2007–08
- Cheshire Vase winners: 2014–15
