= Macclesfield R.U.F.C. =

English rugby union club, based in Macclesfield

(England) Macclesfield
- Full name: Macclesfield Rugby Union Football Club
- Union: Cheshire RFU
- Nickname: Blues
- Founded: 1874; 152 years ago (present club formed in 1927; 99 years ago)
- Location: Macclesfield, Cheshire, England
- Ground: Priory Park (Capacity: 1,250 (250 seats))
- Chairman: Robert Cooke
- League: National League 2 North
- 2025–26: 3rd (relegated by the RFU to Regional 1 North West)
Team kit

Official website
- macclesfieldrufc.co.uk

Macclesfield RUFC is a rugby union team based in the Cheshire town of Macclesfield and operates a women's side, three senior men's sides, senior and junior colts and ten mini/junior teams. The men's first XV currently play in the fifth tier of the English rugby union system, Regional 1 North West, following the RFU's relegating the team from National League 2 North because they refused a level transfer to National League 2 West. The second men's XV plays in the Cotton Traders Premier League and the third XV play in NOWIRUL division 3.

== History ==
Macclesfield RUFC was formed in 1877 although the present club was formed in 1927. After playing at several venues, the club moved to its present home in 1980. Five years later they participated in the forerunner to the launch of the national league system when they participated in the Girobank North West League. Over the last 25 years Macclesfield have climbed the pyramid spending one season in National One during the 2012–13 Season before being relegated but bouncing straight back after winning promotion during 2013–14 Season. However the 2014–15 saw the Blues relegated back to National 2 at the end of the campaign. They won the old North West 1 in 1991–92, North 2 in 1994–95 and entered the old National 3 North, then the fourth tier of club rugby, in 2002, winning the league in 2009–10, by which it had been restructured as National League 2 North.

== Honours ==
- Cheshire Plate
  - Winners (2): 1981–82, 1993–94
- Cheshire Cup
  - Winners (8): 1991–92, 1994–95, 2001–02, 2002–03, 2005–06, 2006–07, 2008–09, 2015–16
  - Runners-up (2): 2004–05, 2007–08
- North West 1 (1): 1992–93
- North 2 (1): 1994–95
- North 1 v Midlands 1 promotion play-off winners (1): 2002–03
- National League 2 North (3): 2009–10, 2013–14, 2015–16
- National Division 2 Champions Cup (1): 2009–10
- Regional 1 North West: 2023–24

== Current standings ==
2025–26 National League 2 North table
Pos	Team	Pld	W	D	L	PF	PA	PD	TB	LB	Pts	Qualification
1	Sheffield (C)	26	24	0	2	1041	467	+574	24	1	121	Promotion place
2	Tynedale	26	21	0	5	941	509	+432	19	3	106	Promotion Play-off
3	Macclesfield	26	20	0	6	1037	725	+312	21	2	103	
4	Hull Ionians	26	17	1	8	801	592	+209	19	3	92	
5	Darlington Mowden Park	26	15	1	10	878	877	+1	20	2	84	
6	Fylde	26	13	3	10	796	664	+132	16	5	79	
7	Wharfedale	26	13	0	13	725	780	−55	15	6	73	
8	Sheffield Tigers	26	12	0	14	686	611	+75	15	8	71	
9	Preston Grasshoppers	26	10	1	15	776	817	−41	16	3	61	
10	Billingham	26	10	0	16	604	905	−301	16	3	59	
11	Otley	26	7	0	19	673	831	−158	12	8	48	
12	Rossendale (R)	26	7	0	19	633	965	−332	14	4	46	Relegation Play-off
13	Scunthorpe (R)	26	5	0	21	622	1097	−475	12	7	39	Relegation place
14	Hull (R)	26	5	0	21	570	943	−373	11	5	36	Relegation place

Updated to match(es) played on 2 May 2026. Source: National League Rugby
Rules for classification: If teams are level at any stage, tiebreakers are applied in the following order:
1. Number of matches won
2. Number of matches drawn
3. Difference between points for and against
4. Total number of points for
5. Aggregate number of points scored in matches between tied teams
6. Number of matches won excluding the first match, then the second and so on until the tie is settled
