= Chester RUFC =

English rugby union club, based in Chester

(England) Chester
- Full name: Chester Rugby Union Football Club
- Union: Cheshire RFU
- Founded: 1925; 101 years ago
- Location: Chester, Cheshire, England
- Ground(s): Hare Lane, Littleton, Chester (Capacity: 2,000 (500 seats))
- League: National League 2 West
- 2025–26: 11th
2nd kit

Official website
- www.pitchero.com/clubs/chesterrufc/

Chester Rugby Union Football Club (also known as Chester RUFC) is a rugby union club based in Chester, Cheshire. The club is governed by the Rugby Football Union and the 1st XV currently competes in the fourth tier of the English rugby union system, National League 2 North, following a level transfer from National League 2 West at the end of the 2025–26 season. The 2nd XV and 3rd XV play in the North West Intermediate Rugby Union leagues.

== History ==
Research shows that there was a rugby club in Chester in the 1880s and apparently there was a game between Chester and New Brighton in 1879–80, but the club later disbanded, The 'new' Chester RUFC was formed in 1925 at the Chester YMCA. In 1932 the club moved to rented facilities at Boughton Hall as tenants of the cricket club where they stayed for almost thirty years until the ground at Hare Lane, Vicars Cross was purchased with the club moving there in 1961. Rugby blossomed in the sixties and seventies with a fixture list including some of the then top clubs in the North and many players awarded county honours. The eighties was a quiet period, with playing strength less than before and the fixture list suffering as a result.

The introduction of league rugby revitalized the club and started a new era. In 1994 a new clubhouse was built and since the turn of the century Chester have reached the Cheshire Cup final three more times, winning in 2004. The 2007–08 season was arguably the most successful in the club's history. Not only were Chester promoted as champions from North 2 West (having been relegated from North 1 the previous season) but they also won the EDF Intermediate Cup, at Twickenham, with a 21–18 win over local rivals Birkenhead Park after an interception allowed winger Simon Love to run in from 80 metres late in the game to secure the win after Centre Liam Lawton had run in a try in the first half.

Since then Chester have performed well at Level 5, finishing runner-up in National League 3 Midlands in 2008–09 but losing heavily in the ensuing North/Midlands promotion play-off game against Hull. The following season they returned to the familiar surroundings of National 3 North (formerly North 1) after a level transfer. In the 2009–10 season Chester finished in the top half of the table after an inconsistent season. However the 2010–11 season, under the leadership of new club captain Andrew Moore, saw Chester reach the North/Midlands play-off game for the second time in three years, once again losing, this time narrowly at Sheffield Tigers 16–14.

The comprehensive 34–6 EDF Intermediate Cup semi-final victory against Newport Salop in 2007–08 saw one of the biggest crowds seen at Hare Lane in recent years.

Recent seasons have seen Chester players return to the Cheshire set up when props James Whitlock-Wainwright and Mike Davies along full back Sean Green were selected to play for Cheshire in the 2009–10 County Championship. Half backs Thomas Chappell and Bryn Snellgrove also appeared in a Cheshire shirt the following year.

Chester holds the Chester Vets tournament each May where teams of over-35's compete in shortened 15-a-side games. This tournament once regularly attracted large numbers of sides but in recent years the turnout in terms of teams has begun to decline but the enthusiasm of the players playing has remained.

== Honours ==
- North West 1 champions: 1997–98
- Cheshire Cup winners: 2004
- North 2 West champions: 2007–08
- EDF Intermediate Cup winners: 2007–08
- National League 3 North champions: 2012–13

== Current standings ==
2026–27 National League 2 North table
Pos	Team	Pld	W	D	L	PF	PA	PD	TB	LB	Pts	Qualification
1	Sedgley Park	8	8	0	0	420	111	+309	8	0	40	Promotion place
2	Darlington Mowden Park	8	6	0	2	388	159	+229	7	1	32	Promotion play-off
3	Chester	8	6	0	2	315	214	+101	6	1	31	
4	Tynedale	8	6	0	2	252	221	+31	6	0	30	
5	Hull Ionians	7	5	0	2	276	220	+56	7	1	28	
6	Preston Grasshoppers	8	5	0	3	295	235	+60	6	1	27	
7	Harrogate	8	3	1	4	204	328	−124	6	0	20	
8	Sheffield Tigers	8	3	0	5	225	229	−4	5	3	20	
9	Fylde	8	3	0	5	198	253	−55	5	0	17	
10	Billingham	8	3	0	5	222	350	−128	5	0	17	
11	Huddersfield	8	2	1	5	202	362	−160	5	1	16	
12	Heath	8	2	0	6	188	282	−94	4	1	13	Relegation play-off
13	Otley	7	1	0	6	183	292	−109	4	1	9	Relegation place
14	Wharfedale	8	1	0	7	203	315	−112	5	0	9	Relegation place

Updated to match(es) played on 2 September 2026. Source: National League Rugby
Rules for classification: If teams are level at any stage, tiebreakers are applied in the following order:
1. Number of matches won
2. Number of matches drawn
3. Difference between points for and against
4. Total number of points for
5. Aggregate number of points scored in matches between tied teams
6. Number of matches won excluding the first match, then the second and so on until the tie is settled
