= Anselmians RUFC =

English rugby union team, based in Eastham, Merseyside

(England) Anselmians
- Full name: Anselmians RUFC
- Union: Cheshire RFU
- Founded: 1947; 79 years ago
- Location: Eastham, Merseyside, England
- Ground: Malone Field
- League: Regional 1 North West
- 2024–25: 2nd

Official website
- www.anselmiansrufc.com

Anselmians RUFC is an English rugby union club based in Eastham, near Birkenhead, Merseyside. The club was founded in 1947 as Old Anselmians by a group of former pupils of St. Anselm's College. The first XV team play in Regional 1 North West, playing in tier 5 for the first time following promotion as champions of Regional 2 North West.

== Honours ==
- Regional 2 North West champions 2022–23
- South Lancs/Cheshire 1 champions 2010–11
- North Lancashire/Cumbria/South Lancs/Cheshire 1 play-off winners 2017–18
- Cheshire Vase winners 2005–06
- Cheshire Plate winners 1996–97
