= Sandbach RUFC =

English rugby union club, based in Sandbach, Cheshire

(England) Sandbach RUFC
- Full name: Sandbach Rugby Union Football Club
- Union: Cheshire RFU
- Nickname: Bach
- Founded: 1936; 90 years ago (present club formed in 1956)
- Location: Sandbach, Cheshire, England
- Ground: Bradwall Road
- League: Regional 2 North West
- 2024–25: 3rd
Team kit

Official website
- www.sandbachrufc.co.uk

Sandbach RUFC is a rugby union team based in the Cheshire town of Sandbach. It operates four senior sides, junior and senior colts and ten mini/junior teams. The first XV play in the sixth tier of the English league system – Regional 2 North West. The second XV plays in the NOWIRUL Cotton Traders Premier League with the third team playing in the NOWIRUL Division 2 South and the fourth team social rugby.

== History ==
Sandbach RUFC, formally known as Old Sandbachians RUFC (after Sandbach School for Boys), was formed in 1936 but became defunct during World War II. The club reformed in 1956 and used one of the Sandbach School's rugby pitches on which to play home games. Local premises near to the school playing fields were used as changing rooms and the Iron Grey, a local pub, was used as a base for after match hospitality. Old boys from Sandbach School were encouraged back to the game and the club grew from strength to strength.

In 1960 the club began admitting non-old boys and in May 1961 a piece of land on Middlewich Road which backed onto Sandbach School premises was purchased and the first clubhouse was built. In the summer of 1980 Old Sandbachians moved from Middlewich Road to Bradwall Road where a new clubhouse and pitches had been developed. By the start of season 1981–82 the club had changed its name from Old Sandbachians to Sandbach Rugby Club.

Sandbach has a rich history of producing top quality players and over the past twenty years the Mini/Junior section has produced a steady stream of top flight players. In the spring of 2012, Premiership side, Sale Sharks featured five ex-Sandbach players in a Premiership game against Wasps.

In 2011, Sandbach became a CASC (Community Amateur Sports Club), reaffirming their principles of not paying players and staying true to their vision as a community based club. In 2012 the club celebrated winning the North 1 West league and with the ensuing promotion celebrated its first ever season of National League Rugby in 2012–13. Sandbach continue to thrive in Level 5 of the RFU Structured Competitions and currently play in the Midlands Premier Division.

In June 2017 the club appointed Byron McGuigan and Rob Webber as Joint Head Coaches. Byron and Rob currently both played Premiership Rugby at Sale Sharks. Both have gained full international caps; Rob for England and Byron for Scotland. Currently the coaching team is led Director of Rugby Andy Bird and Head Coach Matt Bebbington, both teachers of sport in local schools.

== Honours ==
- Cheshire Plate winners: 1985
- North West 1 champions: 1989–90
- Midlands 3 West (North) champions: 2006–07
- Cheshire Vase winners (2): 2008, 2012
- North Division 1 West champions: 2011–12
- Cheshire Cup Champions: 2022

== Notable former players ==
- (England) John Olver
- (England) Mark Cueto
- (England) Matt Beesley
- (England) Will Cargill
- (England) Simon Verbickas
- (England) Will Cliff
- (England) James Gaskell
- (England) Tom Holmes
- (England) Lee Imiolek
- (England) Pete Sherratt
- (Scotland) Graham McCallum
- (Scotland) Duncan MacDonald
- (Scotland) Ewan Ashman
