= Altrincham Kersal RFC =

English rugby union club, based in Timperley, Greater Manchester

(England) Altrincham Kersal
- Full name: Altrincham Kersal Rugby Football Club
- Union: Cheshire RFU
- Nickname: AK
- Founded: 1897; 129 years ago
- Location: Timperley, Trafford, England
- Ground: Stelfox Avenue
- Chairman: Tim Marston
- Captain: Steve Richardson
- League: Regional 2 North West
- 2024–25: 7th
Team kit

Official website
- www.pitchero.com/clubs/altrinchamkersalrfc/

Altrincham Kersal Rugby Football Club is an English rugby union team based in Timperley, Trafford. The club runs three senior men's teams, and mini and junior rugby from age 5. The first XV currently play in Regional 2 North West, a level six league in the English league system, following the club's promotion as champions of Lancs/Cheshire 1 at the end of the 2018–19 season.

== Honours ==
- North-West East 1 champions: 1991–92
- Lancs/Cheshire 1 champions (3): 1996–97, 2014–15, 2018–19
- Cheshire Plate winners: 1997-98
- North Division 1 West champions (2): 2003–04, 2010–11
- Cheshire Vase winners (2): 2011, 2014

== Notable players ==
=== England ===
The following Altrincham Kersal players have represented England at full international level.

- Frank Handford
- Mark Cueto
- John Orwin

=== British and Irish Lions ===
The following Altrincham Kersal players have also represented the British and Irish Lions.

- Frank Handford: 1910
- Mark Cueto
