= Stockport RUFC =

English rugby union club

Stockport
- Full name: Stockport Rugby Union Football Club
- Union: Cheshire RFU
- Founded: 1923; 102 years ago (as Davenport R.U.F.C.)
- Location: Bramhall, Stockport, Greater Manchester, England
- Ground(s): The Memorial Ground (Capacity: 500)
- Coach(es): (England) Tom Eaton
- League(s): Regional 1 North West
- 2024–25: 5th
Team kit

Official website
- stockportrugby.com

Stockport Rugby Union Football Club is a rugby union club based in Stockport, Greater Manchester, England. They play in Regional 1 North West, following their promotion from North 1 West in 2021–22.

== History ==
Stockport RUFC was founded in 1923 as Davenport R.U.F.C, the name changing in 1992. The club has made its way up the rugby pyramid in recent seasons, having been as low as the old North West 3 league at one point in the mid-1990s.

In 2006 the club won the Powergen Intermediate Cup, 11–6 versus Morley, where Mike Raven was awarded man of the match after a dazzling display at Twickenham. During that successful season the club finished 1st in the North 2 West League gaining promotion to National 3 North.

In 2011, Stockport were crowned champions of National 3 North gaining promotion to National 2 North. Six players were also selected to play for Cheshire RFU at the end of the season; Captain David Marwick, Vice Captain Andy Fuller, Tom Cruse, Jan Erik Anderson, Paul Ralph and Jamie Anthony.

During June 2012 Stockport R.U.F.C hosted the first annual Stockport 7s where they will recreate the success of the Glengarth Sevens which ran at the club for 21 years with the first being in 1967.

== Honours ==
- North 1 West champions: 2021–22
- North 2 West champions: 1998–99
- Cheshire Plate winners: 1999
- North Division 2 West champions: 2005–06
- Powergen Intermediate Cup winners: 2006
- North 2 (East v West) promotion play-off winners: 2007–08
- National League 3 North champions: 2010–11
- National League 3 (North v Midlands) promotion play-off winners: 2013–14

== Stadium ==
The club play their home matches at the Memorial Ground, Headlands Road in Bramhall, Stockport.

Since 1998 a marquee has been erected every summer on the 1st team pitch hosting classic pop acts like; Elkie Brooks, Procol Harum, Paul Jones, The Animals, Ruby Turner and Fairport Convention. In 2006 the main attraction were the Troggs who appeared with Marmalade and the Tremeloes. In 2009 The Bootleg Beatles made their second visit to the Marquee two years after their first visit.
