= Blackburn RUFC =

English rugby union club

Blackburn
- Full name: Blackburn Rugby Union Football Club
- Union: Lancashire RFU
- Nickname(s): Burn
- Founded: 1877; 148 years ago
- Location: Blackburn, Lancashire, England
- Ground(s): Ramsgreave Drive
- League(s): Regional 1 North West
- 2024–25: 8th
Team kit

Official website
- www.pitchero.com/clubs/blackburn

Blackburn Rugby Club is an English rugby union club based in Blackburn, Lancashire. The first XV currently play in the level 5 league, Regional 1 North West, having reached the national levels of the sport for the first time in 2019 after winning the North 1 East/North 1 West promotion play-off.

== Honours ==
- North West 1 champions: 1996–97
- North Lancashire/Cumbria champions (2): 2007–08, 2014–15
- North 1 East/North 1 West promotion play-off winners: 2018–19
