= Winnington Park =

English rugby union club, based in Northwich, Cheshire

(England) Winnington Park
- Union: Cheshire RFU
- Founded: 1907; 119 years ago
- Location: Northwich, Cheshire, England CW83AA
- Ground: Burrows Hill (Capacity: 5,000)
- Chairman: Paul Dean
- President: Brian Concannon
- Coach(es): Aaron Collins, Chris Sheppard
- Captain(s): Matt Treacy (men’s), Liv Cole (women’s)
- League: Regional 2 North West
- 2025–26: 7th

Official website
- winningtonparkrfc.rfu.club

Winnington Park Rugby Football Club is a rugby union club situated in Winnington, Northwich in Cheshire, England. The club runs three Men’s senior sides, two Ladies teams, a men’s vets team, a colts side and fifteen mini & junior teams. The club also has Walking and Touch Rugby sections.The Men’s first XV currently play in the Northern Division, in Regional 2 North West following their promotion from South Lancs/Cheshire 2 as champions at the end of the 2017–18 season. The Wprfc Women’s team play in NC2 North (West)

== Rugby Union ==
The club was founded in 1907 as a rugby union club.

Wprfc was formed as one of the many “Sports Sections” of the local Chemical Works, Brunner Mond. In 1926 BM then became part of ICI and after playing at numerous grounds in the Winnington Works areas, moved to Moss Farm in 1947. In 1976, Wprfc so as to gain more independence from the local council & ICI, moved to their current home at Burrows Hill.

The Directors of Rugby for 2026/7 are: Dave Allcock & Richard Querelle (men’s), and Jen Williams (women’s).

Dewi Morris played for Winnington Park before moving on in his career and gaining caps with England, plus The British & Irish Lions

Winnington Park Rugby Club played a prominent role in the pioneering Girobank North West League—an early competitive regional structure introduced in the mid-1980s just before the official national RFU league pyramid launched in 1987. During this era of local league groundwork, Winnington Park achieved consecutive title success and a remarkable winning streak before moving up into the national and area divisions.

Winnington Park rugby club is a few hundred yards across the park from its neighbours Northwich Rugby Club.

== Rugby League ==
Weaverham Rangers rugby league club played in the North West Counties League until 2005. Weaverham Rangers became Winnington Park and joined the Rugby League Conference in 2006. Winnington Park had previously hosted rugby league matches when Crewe Wolves temporarily played there in 2004.

Winnington Park moved to neighbours Northwich RUFC and became Northwich Stags in 2008, the team won the Cheshire Division of the Conference but after 2009 in the Rugby League Merit League the club folded.

== Honours ==
- North 1 champions: 1987–88
- Cheshire Cup winners (5): 1988, 1990, 1991, 1993, 1994. runners up: (4) 1995, 1996, 1998, 2001
- Cheshire Bowl winners (3): 2010, 2011, 2018
- Cheshire Bowl runner-up (2): 2017, 2019
- South Lancs/Cheshire 2 champions: 2017–18
- Papa John Community Shield Regional 2 North: winner 2023
