= New Brighton F.C. (rugby union) =

Rugby union club in New Brighton, Merseyside, England

Coordinates: 53.415449°N 3.1046116°W

(England) New Brighton
- Full name: New Brighton Football Club (Rugby Union)
- Union: Cheshire RFU
- Founded: 1875; 151 years ago
- Location: Moreton, Merseyside, England
- Region: West Cheshire / Wirral
- Ground: Hartsfield (Capacity: 2,000)
- Chairman: Bernard Murphy
- Coach: Ryan Stead
- League(s): Counties ADM 1 Lancashire & Cheshire
Team kit

Official website
- newbrightonrugby.rfu.club

New Brighton Football Club (Rugby Union) are a rugby union team based in Moreton, Merseyside, UK. They are currently playing in the ADM Lancashire Championship League.

The club was formed in 1875 and have been based at several grounds over the years. The club's present home is Hartsfield, situated in Moreton, Wirral, England. One of the most notable matches in the club's history was when they hosted a joint New Brighton / North of Ireland F.C. team to face the 1969 touring South African team. The South Africa national team had initially intended to play an Ulster fixture in Belfast, but this was cancelled and the New Brighton game scheduled in its place. The Springboks won 22–6. Today, the club fields teams from many different age groups, including 3 full senior men's XV, Women's XV, and teams from under-18 to under-5.

== Notable players ==
James Patrick Quinn (New Brighton, England and British Lions) won his first cap for England against Wales on 16 January 1954 at Twickenham. He went on the 1955 British Lions tour to South Africa playing twelve matches (including the last one against East Africa) scoring 21 points from three tries (9 points), three conversions (6 points) and two penalties (6 points).

== Honours ==
- Cheshire Bowl winners (2): 2024
- Cheshire Cup winners (7): 1880, 1996, 1998, 1999, 2000, 2001, 2005
- Cheshire Plate winners (2): 1983, 1992
- North West 1 champions: 1993–94
- North 2 champions: 1995–96
- North 1 champions: 1997–98
- South Lancs/Cheshire 1 champions: 2013–14
