= Winnington =

Suburb of Northwich, Cheshire, England

Coordinates: 53.26630°N 2.53371°W

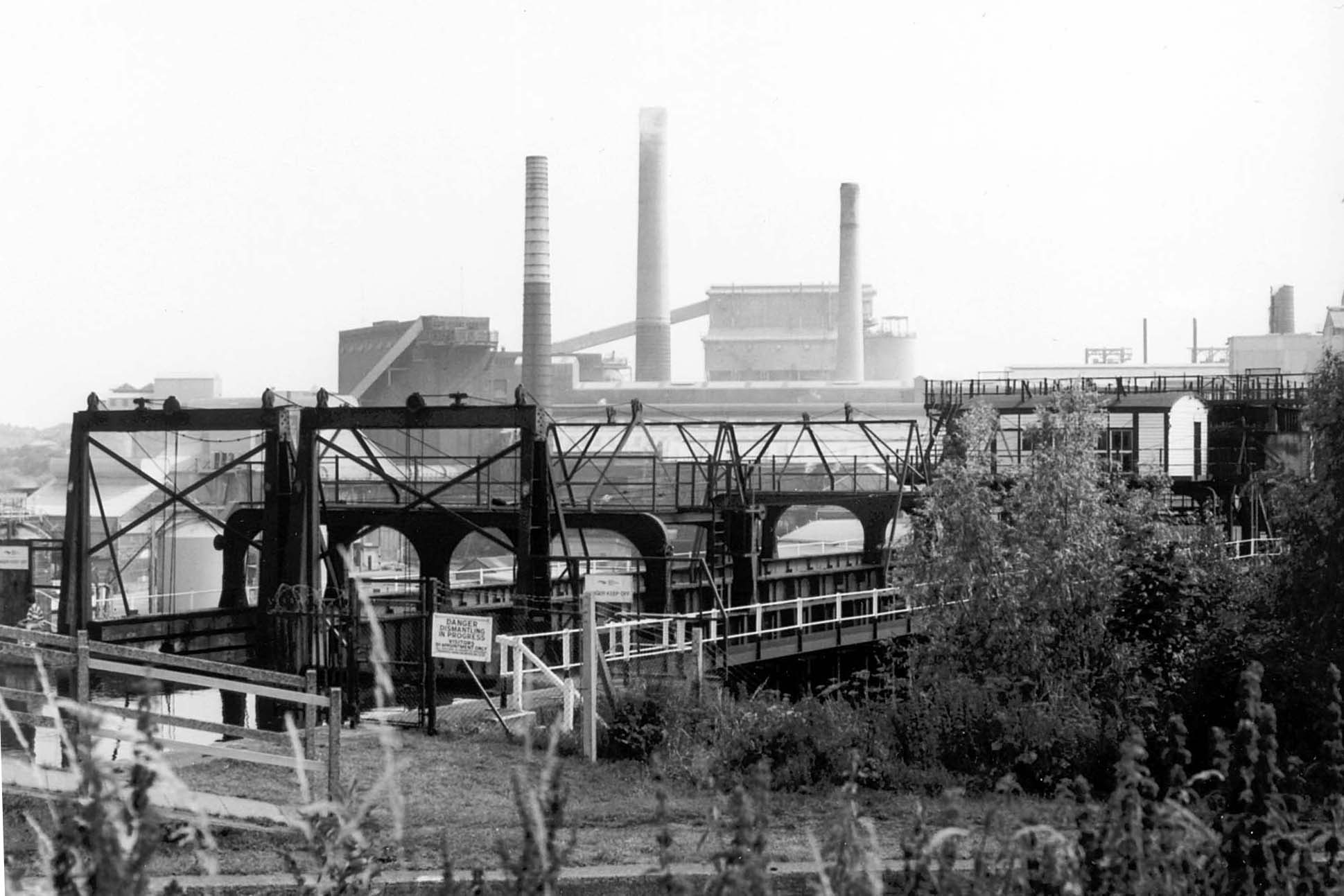
- ICI Winnington Works seen from Anderton Boat Lift in 1992

- Location within Cheshire
- OS grid reference: SJ486585
- Civil parish: Northwich
- Unitary authority: Cheshire West and Chester
- Ceremonial county: Cheshire
- Region: North West
- Country: England
- Sovereign state: United Kingdom
- Post town: NORTHWICH
- Postcode district: CW8
- Dialling code: 01606
- Police: Cheshire
- Fire: Cheshire
- Ambulance: North West
- UK Parliament: Mid Cheshire

Winnington is a ward and northwestern suburb of the town of Northwich, in the Cheshire West and Chester borough of Cheshire, England.

== Industry ==
Winnington is the home to Brunner Mond UK chemical works, where soda ash is created. Polythene, the material used in many plastic items (e.g. plastic bags), was first made at the chemical works by Reginald O. Gibson and Eric W. Fawcett in 1933, during an experiment that 'went wrong'. Most residents in Winnington were employed by ICI (Imperial Chemical Industries); however, many people now work in the town centre, with Brunner Mond still employing hundreds of people. Most of the houses built closer to the ICI plant were built by the company to house their workers.

Winnington also has a combined heat and power station, providing electricity for Brunner Mond.

The Anderton Boat Lift, which lifts boats from the River Weaver navigation to the canal, is nearby.

== The future ==
Winnington Village is a new development consisting of a range of family homes. Developers including Barratt Developments, Taylor Wimpey, Morris and Wilson Homes (Wilson Bowden) are looking to build a new community environment with the potential for a school and leisure facilities.

== Climate ==
Climate data for Winnington, Cheshire elevation: 20 m (66 ft), 1959–1976
Month	Jan	Feb	Mar	Apr	May	Jun	Jul	Aug	Sep	Oct	Nov	Dec	Year
Mean daily maximum °C (°F)	6.9 (44.4)	7.4 (45.3)	9.6 (49.3)	12.5 (54.5)	16.2 (61.2)	19.7 (67.5)	20.3 (68.5)	20.3 (68.5)	17.9 (64.2)	14.6 (58.3)	9.8 (49.6)	7.7 (45.9)	13.6 (56.4)
Daily mean °C (°F)	4.4 (39.9)	4.6 (40.3)	6.2 (43.2)	8.8 (47.8)	12.1 (53.8)	15.2 (59.4)	16.2 (61.2)	16.2 (61.2)	14.0 (57.2)	11.1 (52.0)	6.8 (44.2)	5.0 (41.0)	10.0 (50.1)
Mean daily minimum °C (°F)	1.9 (35.4)	1.9 (35.4)	2.8 (37.0)	5.0 (41.0)	8.0 (46.4)	10.7 (51.3)	12.2 (54.0)	12.1 (53.8)	10.0 (50.0)	7.7 (45.9)	3.8 (38.8)	2.3 (36.1)	6.5 (43.8)
Average precipitation mm (inches)	65.6 (2.58)	44.2 (1.74)	45.2 (1.78)	57.2 (2.25)	66.4 (2.61)	55.0 (2.17)	73.4 (2.89)	75.7 (2.98)	71.0 (2.80)	63.9 (2.52)	78.4 (3.09)	68.5 (2.70)	764.5 (30.11)
Source: CEDA

== Sport ==
Winnington is home to Winnington Park Rugby Football Club that fields both a rugby union and rugby league team.

Also in Winnington is the Jubilee field (so named when it was given to the people of Northwich by Brunner Mond on their 50th anniversary in 1923), the playing fields are home to Winnington Avenue Football Club, with age groups in the Mid Cheshire Youth league from 8 years old to open age.

== History ==
Winnington was formerly a township in the parish of Great Budworth, in 1866 Winnington became a separate civil parish, on 1 April 1936 the parish was abolished and merged with Northwich, Weaverham cum Milton and Hartford. In 1931 the parish had a population of 1268.

== See also ==
- Winnington Hall
- Battle of Winnington Bridge (19 August 1659)
