= Wirral RFC =

English rugby union club, based in Clatterbridge

(England) Wirral
- Full name: Wirral Rugby Football Club
- Union: Cheshire RFU
- Nickname: Old Wirralians
- Founded: 1937; 89 years ago
- Location: Clatterbridge, Merseyside, England
- Ground: Memorial Ground
- President: Dave Van Der Zwan
- Coach(es): Craig Harvey (England) (Head Coach), Keith Mahon (England) (Forwards Coach), Ben Cornford (England) (Assistant Coach), Phil Crowley (England) (Skills Coach)
- Captain(s): Chris Crowley (England) (Captain), James Annetts (England) (Vice-Captain), Nick Hearn (England) (Pack Leader)
- Top scorer: James Annetts (England) (140 Points), Rob Pearl (England) (14 Tries)
- League: Regional 1 North West
- 2024–25: 4th
Team kit

Official website
- www.wirralrugbyclub.com

Wirral Rugby Football Club is a rugby union club based in Thornton Common Road, Clatterbridge, Wirral, England. It has many mini, junior teams from under-7s upwards, and runs colts and four senior men's teams, a ladies team (Wirral Warriors) and girls age group teams. The club was formed in 1937 and was based at the school in Bebbington, and since 1967, at its present ground. The first team play in Regional 1 North West, a fifth level league in the English league system. The team used to be called the "Old Wirralians" due to its historical association with Wirral Grammar School. A former notable player is Matt Cairns who played for England against South Africa in the first test of 2007.

== Honours ==
- South Lancs/Cheshire 2 champions: 2001–02
- Cheshire Plate winners: 2003
- Cheshire Vase winners (2): 2009, 2018
- South Lancs/Cheshire 1 champions: 2009–10
- North 1 West champions: 2013–14
- Papa Johns National Community Cup winners: 2023
