= Clatterbridge =

Coordinates: 53.33°N 3.03°W

- Hamlet
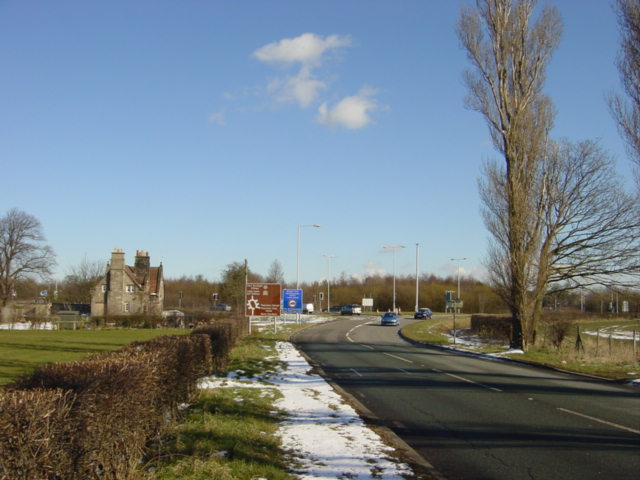
- Sitch Cottage and the A5137 Brimstage Road, looking towards the roundabout at Junction 4 of the M53 motorway

- Location within Merseyside
- Population: 14,411 (Ward) (2011 census)
- OS grid reference: SJ321823
  - London: 176 mi (283 km) SE
- Metropolitan borough: Wirral
- Metropolitan county: Merseyside
- Region: North West
- Country: England
- Sovereign state: United Kingdom
- Post town: WIRRAL
- Postcode district: CH63
- Dialling code: 0151
- ISO 3166 code: GB-WRL
- Police: Merseyside
- Fire: Merseyside
- Ambulance: North West
- UK Parliament: Wirral West

Clatterbridge is a hamlet on the Wirral Peninsula, in the Metropolitan Borough of Wirral, Merseyside, England. It is to the south-west of Bebington and close to the M53 motorway. Clatterbridge is also the name of a local government ward, which includes Brimstage, Raby, Raby Mere, Thornton Hough, Storeton, Spital and the western fringes of Bromborough and Eastham.

At the 2001 census, the total population of the ward was 16,906, falling to 14,411 at the 2011 census. The hamlet of Clatterbridge only had a recorded resident population of 30 in 2001.

== Geography ==
Clatterbridge is in the central part of the Wirral Peninsula, approximately 11 kilometres (7 miles) southeast of the Irish Sea at Leasowe, 7 km (4 1/2 mi) east of the Dee Estuary at Heswall and 4 km (2 1/2 mi) west of the River Mersey at Bromborough. The Clatter Bridge, itself, is at an elevation of approximately 31 m (102 ft) above sea level.

The Clatter Brook merges into the River Dibbin at Raby Mere, before discharging into the River Mersey at Bromborough.

== Economy ==
The major employment sector in Clatterbridge is healthcare. The area is the site of Clatterbridge Health Park, which hosts Clatterbridge Hospital, Clatterbridge Cancer Centre and Radio Clatterbridge.

== Transport ==
=== Road ===
Clatterbridge is located close to junction 4 of the M53 motorway, which joins with the A5137. The B5151 passes across the Clatter Bridge.

=== Rail ===
Spital railway station is the nearest by road, about 2 km (1 1/4 mi) to the east. This station is on the Wirral line of the Merseyrail network, with frequent services to Liverpool, Chester and Ellesmere Port.

=== Bus ===
Buses operating in Clatterbridge as of August 2020:

Number	Route	Operator	Days of Operation
16/16A	Eastham Rake - Upton - Moreton	Stagecoach Merseyside & South Lancashire	Monday - Saturday
17	Eastham Rake - Saughall Massie - Moreton	Stagecoach Merseyside & South Lancashire	Monday - Saturday
410	Clatterbridge Hospital - New Brighton	Arriva North West	Daily
487	Ness Gardens or Little Neston or Parkgate - Liverpool	Arriva North West	Daily

== Notable people ==
- Alison McGovern, currently MP for Birkenhead, was born there in 1980.
