= Lymm RFC =

English rugby union club, based in Cheshire

(England) Lymm
- Full name: Lymm Rugby Football Club
- Union: Cheshire RFU
- Founded: 1960; 66 years ago
- Location: Lymm, Cheshire, England
- Ground: Crouchley Lane (Capacity: 1,000)
- Chairman: David Simpson
- President: John Cartwright
- Coach: Adam Fletcher
- Captain: Nathan Beesley
- League: National League 2 West
- 2025–26: 9th
Team kit

Official website
- www.lymmrugby.co.uk

Lymm Rugby Football Club is an English rugby union team based in Lymm, Cheshire. The club runs five senior sides (including two colts teams) and a full range of junior sides as well as teams in squash, hockey and recently formed a tennis club. The first XV is currently playing in National League 2 West, a fourth tier league in the English rugby union system, following a level transfer from the National League 2 North at the end of the 2024–25 season.

== Ground ==
The club is based at Crouchley Lane on the southern outskirts of town. There are three full size rugby pitches, including the main pitch which is AGP, as well as several mini pitches. There is on-site parking, a club house and facilities for other sports including squash, tennis and field hockey. Capacity around the main rugby pitch is limited to around 1,000 standing.

== Current standings ==
2026–27 National League 2 West table
Pos	Team	Pld	W	D	L	PF	PA	PD	TB	LB	Pts	Qualification
1	Redruth	6	6	0	0	265	121	+144	5	0	29	Promotion place
2	Taunton Titans	6	5	0	1	264	132	+132	5	1	26	Promotion play-off
3	Hinckley	6	5	0	1	253	108	+145	5	0	25	
4	Luctonians	6	5	0	1	198	129	+69	5	0	25	
5	Clifton	6	5	0	1	240	189	+51	5	0	25	
6	Lymm	6	4	0	2	198	202	−4	5	1	22	
7	Old Redcliffians	6	3	0	3	194	188	+6	5	1	18	
8	Cinderford	6	3	0	3	222	250	−28	5	0	17	
9	Loughborough Students	6	2	0	4	197	236	−39	5	1	14	
10	Hornets	6	1	0	5	180	200	−20	4	4	12	
11	Barnstaple	6	2	0	4	139	174	−35	2	1	11	
12	Bournville	6	1	0	5	212	348	−136	5	1	10	Relegation play-off
13	Devonport Services	6	0	0	6	145	294	−149	3	1	4	Relegation place
14	Exeter University	6	0	0	6	140	276	−136	2	0	2	Relegation place

Updated to match(es) played on 5 September 2026. Source: National League Rugby
Rules for classification: If teams are level at any stage, tiebreakers are applied in the following order:
1. Number of matches won
2. Number of matches drawn
3. Difference between points for and against
4. Total number of points for
5. Aggregate number of points scored in matches between tied teams
6. Number of matches won excluding the first match, then the second and so on until the tie is settled

== Honours ==
- Glengarth Sevens Davenport Plate winners: 1973
- Cheshire Cup winners: 1989
- North West 1 champions: 1995–96
- North 1 West champions: 2009–10
- Regional 1 North West champions: 2022–23
