= Vagabonds RUFC =

Manx rugby union club, based in Douglas, IOM

(Isle of Man) Vagabonds
- Full name: Vagabonds Rugby Union Football Club
- Union: Lancashire RFU
- Nickname: Vagas
- Founded: 1965; 61 years ago
- Location: Douglas, Isle of Man
- Ground: Ballafletcher Sports Ground
- Chairman: John Cannan
- President: Jerry Carter
- Coach(es): Franzy Germishuys (Men), Jack Caine (Ladies)
- Captain(s): Matthew Rockwell (Mens), Lauren Ellison (Ladies), Ian Marks (Hornets)
- League: Lancs/Cheshire 2

Official website
- vagabondsrufc.rfu.club

Vagabonds RUFC also known as simply Vagabonds or by their nickname Vagas is a rugby union club located in Douglas, Isle of Man. They are affiliated with the English Rugby Football Union with their Men's Team currently playing in the South Lancs/Cheshire 3 division and the Ladies team playing in North West 1.

== Club history ==
Vagabonds was established in 1965 as Douglas High School Old Boys by school master John Timson, and was made up of current and former players from the Douglas High School rugby team. Soon, the name Vagabonds was adopted (see below). In October 1980, the club moved to a site on Glencrutchery Road, adjacent to the famous TT Grandstand. 31 years later in 2011, the club moved to its current site at Ballafletcher, where the club has a modern clubhouse, changing facilities and two pitches. The 2015/16 season was the Vagabonds 50th Anniversary season

== Honours ==
- North-West West 3 champions: 1989–90
- North-West West 2 champions: 1990–91
- North West 2 champions: 1995–96

== Origin of the name ==
When the club was formed, it was forced to train and play on the rugby pitches nearby because it had no grounds of its own. These pitches were then owned by Douglas Rugby Club (and still are to this day). Due to this lack of a home, the name 'Vagabonds' was soon adopted. Also, due to the sharing of a pitch for many years, a fierce rivalry now exists between Douglas Rugby Club and Vagabonds. Since 2019, the second XV have been known as the "Hornets" due to the black and gold striped kits they wear.

== Team colours ==
The traditional club colours are black, white and gold. The Men's and Ladies' kit consists of a white jersey with a gold band across the chest along with the club crest and sponsor, black shorts and black and gold striped socks. The Hornets kit is a black and gold striped design. The current principal sponsors of Vagabonds are Sure, Isle of Man Steam Packet Company and Tower Insurance Company Ltd. The Hornets kit is sponsored by Colebourn.

== See also ==
- Rugby union in the Isle of Man
- Isle of Man Sport
- Castletown Rugby Club
- Douglas Rugby Club
- Ramsey Rugby Club
- Southern Nomads Rugby Club
- Western Vikings Rugby Club
