= Ramsey R.U.F.C. =

Manx rugby union club, based in Ramsey, IOM

(Isle of Man) Ramsey Rugby Club
- Full name: Ramsey Rugby Union Football Club
- Union: Cheshire RFU
- Nickname: Ramsey Rugby Club
- Location: Ramsey, Isle of Man
- Ground: Mooragh Park
- Chairman: Billy Kneale
- President: Robert Jelski
- Captain: Matthew Meechan
- League: Lancs/Cheshire Division 1
- 2019–20: 8th (relegated to Lancs/Cheshire Division 2) Home Strip

Ramsey Rugby Club is a rugby union team based in Ramsey, Isle of Man. Until the end of the 2019/20 season, the club's First XV played in the English Clubs Championship. The League Structure at levels 8 and 9 disintegrated in March 2020 leaving Ramsey confined to Isle of Man domestic rugby only.

The club operates two senior men's teams. The First XV and a Second XV known to insiders as The Mighty Blues. The club also operates a Junior Section catering from U6 through to U16 and includes two girls groups.

== Club history ==
A long long time ago in a galaxy far far away there was a small school, in a small town on a small Island with a group of schoolboys with nothing in common but a taste for beer and a liking for oddly shaped balls. It was from these humble beginnings that Ramsey Rugby Union Football Club was born.

Under the expert tutelage of Graham Atkinson and Peter Hooson-Owen, Rugby Union was introduced as a curriculum sport at Ramsey Grammar School in the mid-1970s. Both Graham and Peter were playing for Douglas Rugby Club at that time and were keen to share their knowledge with an eager northern audience.

Rugby was a success in the school and as the first batches of pupils began to leave the education system, they found that there was nowhere to play in Ramsey and the north. There were clubs in Peel, Douglas and Ronaldsway, but nowhere else. The decision to form a team was easy to take and in the late 1970s the first Ramsey side took the field. The game was played against Douglas and we won!! The score and other details like that have been lost in the mists of time however Victor Ferreira apparently scored the winning try under the sticks at the school end of the back pitch at the Grammar School.

In the early days, kit was borrowed as was the odd player needed to make up the numbers. The club took part in the big Douglas Easter Festivals as well as playing friendlies against the local sides. The side was made up mainly of youngsters who were fairly new to the sport so it was not a great surprise to find that defeats were common and often heavy. In fact at times, the results were so poor that it was suggested to fold the club. The early diehards had none of this however and good or bad, right or wrong, win or lose the club carried on and on 1 December 1982 was finally admitted to membership of the RFU.

1980s RFU membership meant recognition. The club was listed in the RFU Club directory and contact details were instantly available to clubs around England. As a full member, Ramsey was also entitled to a vote at RFU meetings and an allocation of International tickets. RFU membership also brings with it certain obligations. Colours were needed; players insurance, subs had to be paid not just to Twickenham but also to Cheshire RFU and a whole host of other bits and pieces of admin work which crop up the minute a club becomes official.

It was during this period that the club appointed its first full time official in the rather large shape of Bryan “Doobie” Strickett. Doobie wasn't actually full time as such however after a back problem ended his playing career, he invested so much of his personal time in Club work that he may as well have been full time. Doobie was the club secretary and he used this role to involve himself in as much of the club's operations as he could. He booked pitches, organised referees, helped out at training, collected subs, acted as touch judge and sponge man. He kept records, photographs and press cuttings. He organised the club's dinners, the Christmas Disco, he kept minutes of meetings, he ordered kit and he dealt with all club correspondence and represented Ramsey at the Isle of Man Federation of Rugby Clubs. If anyone ever deserved the title Mr Ramsey Rugby in the 1980s it was Doobie. Without the effort he put into these early years, the club wouldn't be the success it is now.

The club initially played in what was known as “The Second Team Shield” however as the 1980s neared an end another new club sprung up on the Island (Southern Nomads) a sponsor was found for the competition and a formal domestic league was set up. The Castletown Ales Manx Shield as it was known then was played in much the same way as it is now. Everyone plays each other home and away and the winner is the team with the most points at the end of it all. New club Southern Nomads won the first Manx Shield in 1987/88 and Ramsey bagged it in 1988/89 to show that the decision to carry on playing was a good one. 1988 also saw the club make its first Tour which was to Peebles in the Scottish borders.

1990s The Manx Shield was dominated by Vagabonds B in the early 1990s. Ramsey were right behind them and rivalry was pretty fierce on the field (and off it too on occasion). Games between the two were very close, often decided by a single penalty and this only served to intensify the rivalry. In May 1994 however the annual General meeting of the Club took a decision which was to change the fortunes of the club on the field and kick start a whole new phase of domestic domination for Ramsey. What did they decide? I hear you cry, well, they made Alf Cannan Captain.

Under Alf's leadership Ramsey took the Manx Shield in 1994/95 and again in 1995/96. We also won the Shield in 1996/97, 1998/99, 1999/00, 2000/01, 2001/02, 2002/03, 2003/04, 2004/05 and 2006/07 in a period of domination which saw the club outgrow domestic competition.

Another landmark in the 1990s was the introduction of a second team. The Shield success in the late 80s saw a big influx of new players to the club and eventually there were just too many to try to fit in one team. The seconds competed in the Shield along with the firsts and while they weren't as successful the second team proved to be an excellent breeding ground for future first teamers.

The final big development of the 1990s was the Mooragh Project. After much soul searching the club decided to embark on a pitch development at the Mooragh. Much fundraising had been done for this but even so the project took just about every penny we had and only for Ramsey Town Commissioners weighing in with £5000 we would have been on our uppers. Thankfully, the pitch project was a huge success. The surface is excellent for running rugby and it drainage is second to none. Since the pitch was opened in 1996 we’ve lost very few games to bad weather. At the time it cost around £35000 which now seems like money well spent.

The noughties and beyond The Shield has become Ramsey property more or less and while a slight fall in playing numbers saw us drop the second team, we formed an alliance with Southern Nomads and launched the Northern Spaniards. This loose association allowed us to continue blooding new players until we were strong enough to stand on our own again. The Spaniards’ final game saw them lift the Shimmin Wilson Manx Bowl at the end of 2006/07. We are now back up to 2 teams of our own and have moderate success both on and off Island.

By far the biggest development in the 2000s to date has been the building of our very own clubhouse. This project was driven by Garry Vernon and Sally Mason and was funded by our own money raising, an interest free loan from the RFU and Sports Council & Lottery Grants. The building opened in December 2003 and has seen plenty of use from both the club and members of the local community.

Thanks are due to many people for this pivotal development for the club and there are too many to mention here. Special thanks are however due to our representative at the RFU the late Mike Lord for all the support he gave us in the corridors of power and also to the late Eric Quinn whose firm E&E Construction did the building work.

Cheshire Cup and Plate With success coming on the Island in the 1990s it was the right time to try to build some off the Island and the club entered the Cheshire Cup for the first time. We lost away at Shell Stanlow (now Ellesmere Port) and Old Anselmians but finally we got a few wins too. Port Sunlight, Wallasey, Parkonians, Helsby and Runcorn all crashed out of the competition against non-league Ramsey at some stage and we have also given bigger clubs plenty of scares along the way.

In recent years however reorganisation of the County competitions has seen our entry restricted to the Cheshire Plate only. The building of a bar and clubhouse has meant that we can play our home fixtures at home and use the bar revenue to assist with the travelling costs which we have to pay. For those of you who don't know, the Manx side have to meet the travelling expenses of the UK side in full. For this reason we’ve not entered for many years.

Ramsey Juniors In the early 2000s it became readily apparent that we needed to become more proactive in player recruitment. We had and still have a fantastic game to be involved with both on and off the field but we were doing nothing to market it.

Club coach Gareth Hinge MBE together with a dedicated band of volunteers took the bull by the horns. Coaching qualifications were obtained and contacts were forged with local schools and we started to bring rugby to the north. Our junior section was formed and we are now seeing the fruits of all this hard work with juniors making the leap into our senior sides.

Their finest hour? No resume of the club's history would be complete without a mention of the Manx Cup. The Cup had been the exclusive property of Douglas and Vagabonds for a long long time. The draw was seeded each year and we always fell at the semi-final hurdle when we met the league sides. All that changed in 1995 when a semi final victory against Douglas put us into the final. We were out muscled by Vagabonds in 1995 and again the following season. A third consecutive final was ruled out in 1997 when MRFU awarded a drawn semi to Douglas year and the run seemed all but over.......until 2001.

We beat Nomads 63–0 in the opening round and went on to meet Vagabonds in the semi-final. We lost 18–13 at the Mooragh but the MRFU ordered the game to be replayed after Vagabonds fielded ineligible players. They were unable to comply with the replay order and our place in the final was secured.

The final against Douglas was on 5 May 2001 and a try by Chairman Billy Kneale saw us squeeze out Douglas 20–15 in a magical afternoon which saw skipper Mike Caine lift the Cup to make Ramsey the first and only team to do the Manx Double.

For the record the squad that day was Simon Mason, Billy Kneale, Chris Melvin, Darren Ideson, Tynan Pritchard, Mike Caine, Will Moffatt, Mark Corkill, Geoff Quayle, Matt Moffatt, Aneurin Pritchard, Gareth Hinge MBE, Garry Vernon, Myles Ellis, Dave Harding, Mickey Melvin, Chris Penketh, Matt Livesey, Jason Walker, Andy Gale and Rupert Leaton.

The League years After several seasons of struggling with domestic fixtures the club was finally admitted into the English Clubs Championship in 2008 and details of that are below.

== Honours ==
The club's first success was winning the Shimmin Wilson Manx Shield in the 1988/89 season. It regained the Shield in 1994/95, 1995/96, 1996/97, 1998/99 and 1999/00. In the 2000/01 season, Ramsey completed their biggest achievement winning the domestic double of the Shimmin Wilson Manx Shield and the Dorchester Maritime Manx Cup. The club also won the Shield in 2001/02, 2002/03, 2004/05, 2006/07 and 2007/08. In 2006/07, Ramsey completed another double winning the inaugural Shimmin Wilson Manx Trophy. The club's second team also won the Shimmin Wilson Manx Bowl in 2005/06 and 2014/15. The latter was dubbed "the miracle of Ballafletcher and is reported to be made into a Hollywood movie with Vin Diesel starring as skipper Gareth Hinge.

Following the consistent domestic success the club was admitted into the English Clubs' Championship in 2008/09. Ramsey played its first ever game in South Lancashire/Cheshire Division 4 of the English league system on 13 September 2008 away to Linley & Kidsgrove RUFC. Tries from Shaun Wyllie and Fintan Cummins ensured Ramsey a 14–5 victory.

In 2003, Ramsey completed the construction of its Club House at The Mooragh Park in Ramsey. In 2013 the club enhanced its facilities with the installation of match standard floodlights.

== Team performance ==
=== 2008/09 season ===
Ramsey finished 2nd in the League and was accordingly promoted to the South Lancs/Cheshire Division 3.

=== 2009/10 season ===
Ramsey topped the table for much of the season but successive losses to Holmes Chapel and Prenton left the club needing to win their last two games to be promoted. They achieved this, and secured promotion with a 43–3 win away at Ellesmere Port.

=== 2010/11 season ===
Ramsey struggled a little in the new league (South Lancashire/Cheshire Division 2) and finished in a lower mid-table position.

=== 2011/12 season ===
Vagabonds' relegation the previous season saw all three Manx clubs competing in the same division. Ramsey again achieved a safe lower mid table position.

=== 2012/13 season ===
For the first time in the club's history Ramsey beat Vagabonds in a competitive match - not just once but three times. An Andy Cleator conversion sealed the deal at Ballafletcher while in the return leg Ramsey won more comfortably. Ramsey also beat Vagabonds in the semi-final of the Manx Cup. However Ramsey lost the cup final to Douglas and narrowly avoided relegation from the league.

=== 2013/14 season ===
After struggling all season in South Lancashire/Cheshire Division 2, the club went into the final match needing a bonus point win against championship contenders Bowdon to avoid relegation. They failed and were relegated to the South Lancashire/Cheshire Division 3. In the Manx Cup they were beaten 48-0 by Douglas in the semi-final. The second team ("The Mighty Blues") won the Shimmin Wilson Manx Bowl, beating Emerging Nomads 43–5 in the final.

=== 2014/15 season ===
Ramsey were cruising to promotion until the ides of March. A shock away defeat at Knutsford took the season to a nailbiting conclusion, but a 59–20 win away at Capenhurst was enough to clinch the second promotion spot. However, there was an RFU league restructure, and Ramsey moved into a new league badged Cheshire South. A 32–3 home defeat to Douglas put the Ramsey out of the Manx Cup too. Domestically The Mighty Blues finished fourth in the Manx Shield, but lifted the Manx Bowl in an epic match against Emerging Nomads, winning in extra time. The Blues also finished runners up in the Manx Plate.

=== 2015/16 season ===
Cheshire South turned out to be a mixed bag, with good competitive fixtures on the whole, but the occasional mismatch. It was a stiffer contest than the season before, and Ramsey toiled away, eventually finishing eighth. At the end of the season, however, the experimental restructure was abandoned and Cheshire South was merged with Cheshire West and then split into South Lancs/Cheshire Divisions 2 & 3. Ramsey just missed the cut, and dropped into Division 3. A Manx Cup final at the Mooragh saw a bumper crowd and a heavy defeat to Douglas. The Blues put in a huge shift to finish second in the Manx Shield and were runners up again in the Manx Plate.

=== 2016/17 season ===
South Lancs/Cheshire Division 3 was another mixed bag, with Aspull the dominant side. Ramsey put in an improved performance and finished fifth. The Manx Cup however did not go so well and they lost 10–5 away at Southern Nomads. Domestically "The Mighty Blues" finished third in the Manx Shield. A 20–12 defeat by Douglas B was a disappointment, as a win would have put the Blues into a playoff with Nomads.

=== 2017/18 season ===
Another season, another league restructure. This time it was horrible. The league was split into two sister leagues of ten and nine teams respectively. Matches were played home and away, with the top five and top four from each league then splitting into a second league in which each side played each other just once. Ramsey made the top five but lost all their away matches and finished fourth in the secondary league. The club however were invited to play in the RFU National Vase. A condition of entry was playing all home games within the county of Cheshire, but there was no funding available for travel. The club decided to commit and after beating Creighton and Liverpool University in the Pool stages they went to the quarter-finals and lost away to eventual winners Otliensians. The Vase meant no space on the calendar for the Manx Cup. At home, the Blues did not fare so well, finishing 6th in the Shield.

=== 2018/19 season ===
The inevitable league restructure happened, mainly due to an internal civil war at Northern Division of the RFU which resulted in 22 Lancs clubs pulling out of the English Clubs Championship. Ramsey were pitched into Lancs/Cheshire Division 3. The club led pretty much from start to finish and eventually wrapped up its first league title on 6 April 2019 by beating Old Bedians 34–14 at Mooragh Park. The season was also notable for long-serving player John F Watling, who notched up his 200th league appearance. John played in the very first league match at Linley back in 2008. In among all the league drama, the club also qualified for the final of a new look Manx Cup competition. The Blues started slowly but improved rapidly, mainly due to an influx of 17 year olds from Ramsey's junior set up. The U14s also qualified for the final of the Cheshire Vase competition.

=== 2019/20 season ===
This started badly and became progressively worse. A number of players from the championship winning side either retired, or left which left a huge hole in the First XV. Up stepped a group of seventeen year olds from the Mighty Blues and while they lacked experience, they had bags of commitment. Results weren't good and the highlight was a home draw against Garstang. Relegation was confirmed well before covid became an issue. To make matters worse, the internal civil war which had been plaguing Northern Division reared its head and a large group of Lancashire clubs left ECC. There was therefore nothing left for Ramsey other than the IOM domestic leagues. If that wasn't bad enough, the RFU cut the travel budget so even if there was a league, Ramsey would be priced out of it. Then, to ice the cake, there was an internal central heating oil leak in the clubhouse which has left the bar and kitchen unusable since 25 March 2020. There was however some light among all the darkness.

As the IOM was locked down for covid, Gareth Hinge MBE and Dave Harding decided that they wanted to assist those people in the community who were shielding. They set up a network of club members covering their own local areas around the north. They did a leaflet drop and then set about shopping, dog walking, collecting prescriptions and much more. Gareth then linked his service into IOM Foodbank and turned the changing rooms into huge larder cupboards. He also linked with IOM Creameries and Ramsey Bakery to set up Ramsey Rugby Club's Doorstep Deliveries of fresh dairy products and bread. The work featured in local press, RFU pages and Gareth Hinge MBE was honoured in the Queens Birthday Honours list for his work. The story of the Ramsey response to covid is set to be made into a Hollywood blockbuster with Bruce Willis lined up to play Hinge. Bob Hoskins' death means that the casting team are still looking for someone to play Dave Harding.

=== 2020/21 season ===
The Isle of Man emerged from the covid lockdown in the middle of June 2020 and for 6 months life returned to normal(ish). With all ECC rugby cancelled due to either covid or the "Lancashire" problem, Ramsey entered into the IOM domestic comps. To try to mix it up a little, a few weeks of regional friendlies were held on a north–south/East/West basis with the dividing line seeing skipper Eddie Lord and the Kneale brothers all playing for the West. Once these games were dispatched, the proper comps started and Ramsey played in a five team league with Douglas 1, Douglas 2, Vagabonds 1 and Southern Nomads 1. The comp was won by Douglas 1 and the Ramsey highlight was beating the champions in the final game. The Blues played in a similar comp and after losing their first match, strung together a nine-game unbeaten run and only just missed out when they lost the deciding game against Vagas 2. Covid then struck again and a series of further lockdowns curtailed all further competition.

=== 2021/22 season ===
With covid now becoming a bad memory, there was some optimism ahead of the 21/22 season. It didn't last! Douglas returned to ECC however at the lower levels there was still nothing. Vagabonds elected to remain in domestic competition and two new look comps were set up. The Ravenscroft Manx Trophy and the Bowl. The Reds played in the Trophy and the Mighty Blues in the Bowl. Games were played on a round robin home and away basis with the top tw0 in each league playing off in the Finals. Both teams made their respective finals and on 8th Jan 2022 The Reds beat Vagabonds 52-3 to take the Trophy and the Mighty Blues beat Vagabonds Hornets 45-25 to take the Bowl.

Post Christmas a Ravenscroft Manx Cup and Plate competition got underway. This was played in the same format as the Trophy and Bowl and both Ramsey teams qualified for the finals which were held at the Mooragh on 14 May. The Reds faced Vagabonds in the Cup Final and won an epic game 36-31 after extra time. Dan Bonwick scored the winning try and the second ever Manx Cup win was secured. The Blues faced Emerging Nomads in the Plate final and lost 32-25.

== Club colours ==
Ramsey initially played in yellow jerseys before adopting red and black hoops. In the late 1980s a change of colours was introduced with a dark blue/light blue quartered design used by the second XV. Various design changes have taken place the main one being the introduction of a red and blue hooped design for the 2012/13 season as part of a new sponsorship deal with Ramsey Bakery Limited. The club however decided to revert to red and black hoops from the beginning of the 2016/17 season

As at 1 September 2016 the playing strip is

First 15 Red and black hoops, black shorts & red and black hooped socks.

Second 15 Dark and light blue hoops, black shorts and dark & light blue hooped socks.

== Club honours ==
1st XV

- Shimmin Wilson Manx Shield winners (12): 1989, 1995, 1996, 1997, 1999, 2000, 2001, 2002, 2003, 2005, 2007, 2008
- Dorchester Maritime Manx Cup winners: 2001
- Shimmin Wilson Manx Bowl winners: 2006
- Shimmin Wilson Manx Trophy winners: 2007
- Lancs/Cheshire Division 3 champions: 2018–19
- Ravenscroft Mans Trophy winners 2022
- Ravenscroft Manx Cup winners 2022
- Ravenscroft Manx Shield winners 2023

2nd XV

- Shimmin Wilson Manx Bowl winners (2): 2014, 2015
- Ravenscroft Manx Bowl winners 2022

== See also ==
- Rugby union in the Isle of Man
- Isle of Man Sport
- Castletown Rugby Club
- Douglas Rugby Club
- Southern Nomads Rugby Club
- Vagabonds Rugby Club
- Western Vikings Rugby Club
