= Rugby union in the Isle of Man =

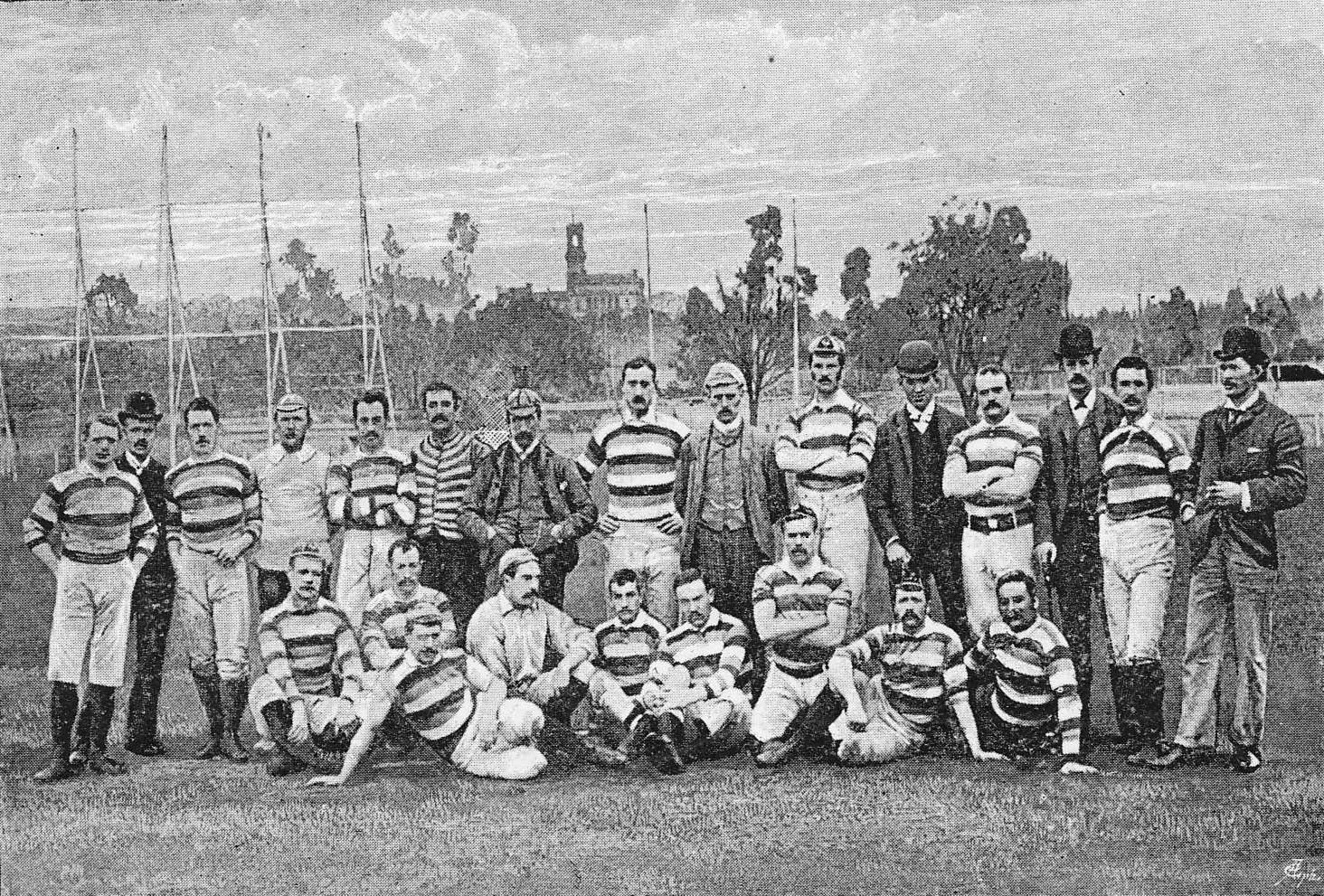
- The 1888 British Isles side including Manx player A.P. Penketh
- Country: Isle of Man
- Governing body: Rugby Football Union
- National team: Isle of Man
- First played: late 19th century
- Clubs: 6

Rugby union in the Isle of Man is a popular sport. It has no national competitive side of its own, and is not affiliated to the IRB in its own right. For this reason, it has no IRB ranking.

== Governing body ==
Rugby Union is played in the Isle of Man under the auspices of the Cheshire Rugby Football Union which is affiliated to the (English) Rugby Football Union. The sport is organised and operated by a Manx Executive Committee which is a sub-committee of Cheshire RFU.The Isle of Man is politically neither part of the UK nor of England, but Manx rugby has a relationship with English rugby.

== History ==
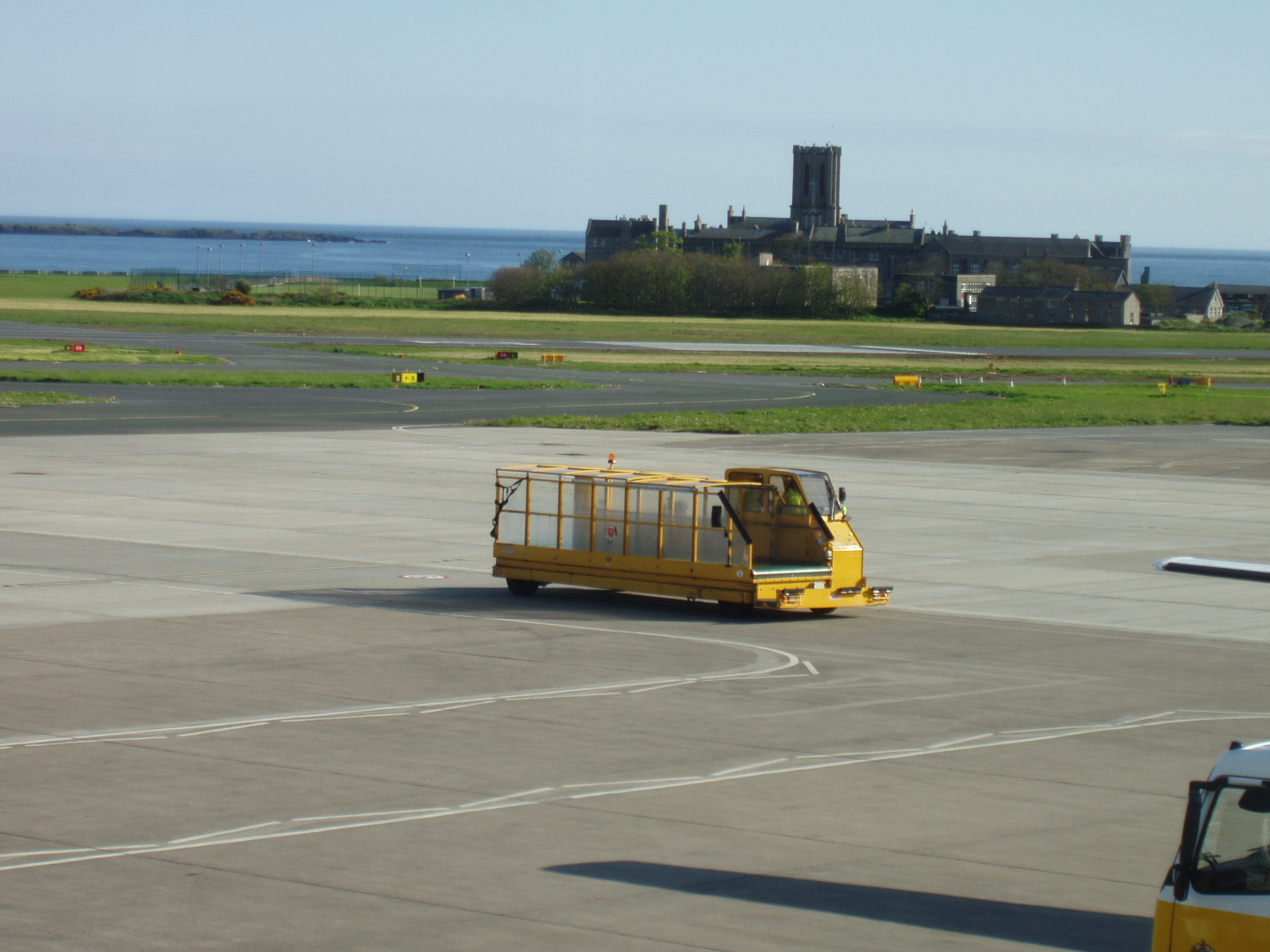
King William's College as seen across the runway of Ronaldsway Airport.

Due to its proximity to England, and the major rugby nations of Ireland, Scotland and Wales, Manx rugby is amongst the oldest in the world, dating back to the mid 19th century. King William's College, the island's best known private school took the game up early and it is still one of the school's main sports, and a number of other Manx schools also play, such as Castle Rushen High School, Ramsey Grammar School. The Manx Government also funds a full-time rugby development officer.

An early club was Mona RFC, which is now defunct.

There are a number of rugby union clubs within the island that contest the domestic competitions the Manx Shield and the Manx Cup. Reigning Shield Champions are Douglas Rugby Club with the Manx Cup yet to be decided. Other clubs include Castletown Rugby Club, Ramsey Rugby Club, Southern Nomads Rugby Club, Vagabonds Rugby Club and Western Vikings R.U.F.C

There is also a London Manx RFC side.

Ramsey Rugby Club, Douglas Rugby Club and Vagabonds Rugby Club all had teams participating in the English Clubs Championship until 2020. At levels 8 & 9 of the structure there were insufficient teams to run a worthwhile league system. Ramsey & Vagabonds were therefore back in domestic competition only. Douglas and Vagabonds Ladies fell victims to the COVID-19 pandemic and are in a similar position.

As yet, the Isle of Man has fielded a national team only on a sporadic basis.

== Notable players connected with the Isle of Man ==
The following are notable Manx rugby union players, or people with a connection to the island.

- G.A.M. Isherwood, British Lions player, attended Ramsey Grammar School, but was born and spent most of his life in England... for which he was strangely never selected.
- A.P. Penketh, of Douglas RC, who took part in the first 1888 British Isles tour to New Zealand and Australia
- Doug Davies, 24 caps for Scotland, died in Peel.
- Neil Bennett, played for England, born in Ramsey.
- Douglas Bader, better known as a flying ace, spent the first two years of his life in the IOM.
- Bevan Rodd, England player, born in Scotland, who grew up in the Isle of Man

== Broadcast media ==
The Isle of Man has no television of its own, but does have its own radio station. However, British and Irish television can both be received on the island, and often include extensive rugby coverage - such as the Rugby World Cup and Six Nations Championship

== Teams ==
- Castletown R.U.F.C.
- Douglas R.U.F.C.
- Ramsey R.U.F.C.
- Southern Nomads R.U.F.C.
- Vagabonds R.U.F.C.
- Western Vikings R.U.F.C.
