= Western Vikings R.U.F.C. =

Isle of Man rugby union club, based in Peel

(Isle of Man) Western Vikings Rugby Club
- Full name: Western Vikings Rugby Union Football Club
- Union: Cheshire RFU
- Nickname: Vikings
- Emblem: Viking Longboat
- Founded: 1989; 37 years ago
- Location: Peel, Isle of Man
- Ground: QEII High School
- Chairman: Ryan Burke
- President: Stephen Kelly
- Coach: Paul "Suggs" Gale
- Captain: Ashley Howard
- League: Manx Shield
- 2013-14: 5th

First match
- Vagabonds C 23 – 0 Western Vikings (12 November 1989)

Official website
- www.westernvikingsrufc.com

Western Vikings Rugby Club is a rugby union team based in Peel, Isle of Man. They are affiliated to the Cheshire Rugby Football Union and in turn the English Rugby Football Union.

They compete in the Manx Shield competition which the club won in the 1997-1998 season. The club also won the Manx Bowl competition in the 2003-2004 season.

They also compete in the BSM Manx Cup and have in the past competed in the Cheshire Cup on numerous occasions.

Western Vikings currently play their home games at the QEII High School in Peel, Isle of Man.

== Club history ==
=== Early years and formation ===
Western Vikings Rugby Club came into existence in November 1989 by Tony Gale and Dave Berry. They got together a group of friends who decided to play a few games of rugby. There was surprisingly good response to their idea which resulted in the club being formed.

The first game was played away to Vagabonds C at Glencrutchery Road on 12 November 1989. The score was a respectable 23-0 to Vagabonds C. The club then held a meeting on 30 November 1989 when the first committee was elected. David Lancaster was elected the first club Chairman, with Tony Gale being elected the first Club Captain.

The club carried on in the 1989/90 season by playing only friendly games basically to become known as Western Vikings RUFC (as opposed to Peel RUFC) within the rugby world in the Isle of Man and the Cheshire RFU.

The club secured a pitch at the Queen Elizabeth II High School in Peel, Isle of Man on which to play their home games. The team's clubhouse and main meeting point was decided to be The Creek Inn in Peel with permission of the Licensee, Robert McAleer. Vikings then competed in their first ever Easter Festival at Douglas RUFC's pitch at Port-a-Chee in 1990. The teams played were Rossendale RUFC and Sunderland RUFC, although the Vikings were defeated, it proved to be the beginning of both playing and social experiences for the members.

The club then grew in strength and viewing numbers by the end of the season which was rounded off with their first annual dinner held at the King Edward Bay Golf Club on Friday, 11 May.

=== Shield winners ===
Vikings finest hour was when they won the Manx Shield in 1998 with a last match 39-38 victory over Vagabonds at Glencrutchery Road. This was the first and only time the club have won the Manx Shield. They also won the Manx Bowl in 2004 with victory over Castletown at Mooragh Park.

=== Youth commitment and disbandment ===
During the 2003/2004 season the club was approached by Ian "Wagga" Williams the head of Rugby Development on the Island to start up a youth Section for the club this was in conjunction with the Manx Youth Games being held on the Island to help train the Juniors of the West of the Island for the Tag Rugby section in the games, this coaching was taken on by Matthew Wozniak as the head coach and Brian Wozniak as an assistant coach.

With help from one or two other players the Youth team went from strength to strength over the years. This laid a platform for some of the young players to learn their trade and hopefully progress and play for the club in future years. The senior team disbanded after the 2006/07 season after losing many senior players through injury and retirement. This time the club was still running a junior section with the intention of reforming a senior side in the near future.

=== Resurrection ===
It was some five years until the west had a senior rugby team again. In March 2012, Western Vikings announced that they would be reforming their senior side and entering a team in the 2012/13 Manx domestic season.

Vikings currently have one senior team entered in the Shimmin Wilson Manx Shield and the BSM Manx Cup and have numerous junior teams starting from under 7's all the way to school leaving age.

== Life members ==
Introduced in 2013 to honour club members who, after their playing careers are over, have remained a part of the club and are always on hand to lend advice and offer assistance on match days and training. The inductees to the Vikings hall of fame are presented with a blazer to commemorate the award and this is presented at the annual dinner.

== Senior team performance ==
=== 2012/2013 season ===
Western Vikings entered the league for the first time since 2006/07 and were given an away trip to Emerging Nomads to start the season. Vikings won the game 24-17 with Paul Wheeldon scoring the first try since the resurrection. The first home game brought Castletown to the QEII for their first trip to Peel, for some years. Vikings lost this match 27-15 after losing some notable players to injury early in the game.

It can be seen as a successful season for Vikings having defeated Castletown 12-10, and Ramsey B 19-18. They have also completed the double over Emerging Nomads with a 50-17 home win. Vikings finished fourth in the Manx Shield and had the choice to play in either the Trophy or the Bowl for the remainder of the season.

Vikings opted to play against the better opposition in the Manx Trophy and failed to register a win. Vikings finished the season with a 66-12 loss to Vagabonds B in the Manx Plate semi final.

Numerous injuries have affected the season, most notably a handbag injury to team captain Mike Sheeley in only the fifth game of the season. Even with these injuries Western Vikings have used over forty players in their comeback season which they will be looking to add to over the summer months.

=== 2013/2014 season ===
This is a landmark season for Vikings as it will be the 25th season that Western Vikings has been in existence. Vikings have enjoyed a pre-season tour taking part in a seven's tournament in Cheshire where they left a positive lasting impression of Manx rugby on all teams they met. Pre-season training commenced on 4 July 2013 and is held weekly on Thursday at the QEII from 6.30pm onwards.

On 29 June 2013 Vikings held the Annual General Meeting. A new captain was to be elected and Paul Wheeldon was unanimously selected to lead Vikings into the 2013/14 season. Another major change was the appointment of long time club captain Paul Gale as head coach. It was also announced that a coaching team was to be selected in order to progress the team on the pitch.

There will also be the need for a youth committee, which will be led by youth co-ordinator Chris Horton. Horton will select a small committee that will handle the club's youth teams, players and coaches and the organization of matches and tournaments both on and off the island.

Vikings' season started on 14 September and they faced two tough away fixtures in the first two weeks. First up was Douglas B who were one of the favourites for the title. Vikings suffered a heavy defeat and that was followed up by another less heavy defeat at the hands of Vagabonds B the following week.

Their first home game was against Ramsey B and this brought about their first league win of the season. Kevin Mellor was the pick of the players picking up two tries in the process. Vikings then had another three tough games. A very close game against Vagabonds B which resulted in a 23-15 loss was sandwiched in between two defeats by current Champions Southern Nomads. Vikings then had a home match against Castletown at the QEII. Vikings came away with the spoils and their highest winning score since the resurrection, defeating Town by 61 unanswered points. Sam Radcliffe scored a hat trick of tries with Mark Venables picking up 21 points with a try and eight conversions.

Vikings managed another two more victories before the end of the Manx Shield campaign. A close 8-7 home win over Emerging Nomads with Tony Grundy scoring the decisive penalty for Vikings. Their other win was another close 13-12 victory over Castletown at Poulsom Park. Mark Venables kicked the winning penalty with the last kick of the match.

Vikings finished the Manx Shield season one place worse off in joint fifth place in the Manx Shield however did finish with one more point than the previous season. Vikings were defeated in the Manx Cup by Southern Nomads. This relegated them to the Manx Plate where they beat Castletown 32-19 at Poulsom Park to reach their first final since the resurrection. They played Vagabonds B team in the final however lost 66-5 at the home of their opponents.

Vikings finished the season without silverware after defeats in the final three games of the Manx Bowl. The bowl was eventually won by Ramsey B after defeating Emerging Nomads in the final.

==== 2013/2014 awards ====
Nationality	Player	Award
England	Paul Wheeldon	Player of the Season
Isle of Mann	Kevin Mellor	Young Player of the Season
Isle of Mann	Ashley Howard	Most Improved Player of the Season
England Isle of Mann Isle of Mann	Paul Wheeldon/Sam Radcliffe/Kevin Mellor (8)	Top Try Scorer
England	Mark Venables (63)	Top Points Scorer
Sweden	Anna-Lena Kelly	Clubmann of the Season
England	Ryan Burke	Captain's Bowl
Isle of Mann	Chris Horton	Chairman's Shield
Sweden Isle of Man	Anna-Lena Kelly & Lianne Watterson	Supporter of the Season

==== 2014/15 Manx Shield fixtures ====
Date	Team	Home/Away	Result
06/09/14	Vagabonds B	Away	L 38-7
13/09/14	Douglas B	Home	L 57-12
20/09/14	Ramsey B	Home	W 38-25
27/09/14	Emerging Nomads	Home	TBA

== Club colours ==
Vikings play in a black shirt with a white "V", black shorts and black and white socks. Their alternative kit is a white shirt with a red "V", white shorts and white socks.

The youth teams play in a black shirt with a white "V", however they are encouraged to wear their school shorts and socks in a 'barbarians' style playing kit.

== Sponsors ==
The senior team's primary sponsor is elecbits.com and this is displayed on both kits. The team also has two secondary shirt sponsors that only appear on the black and white kit. These are Chimney Cowl Products and IFS Limited.

elecbits.com and Chimney Cowl Products are also displayed on all senior training kit and leisurewear.

The junior kit only has one sponsor that is displayed on the kit. This is Tony Quaye Joinery and the sponsor is also displayed on all junior training kit and leisurewear.

The club is also sponsored by The Creek Inn free house where the senior rugby team gather after training and matches. The club also has numerous match day sponsors throughout the season.

== Community work ==
The club has a social and community committee whose aim is to provide assistance and help primarily in the west of the island where the club is based. Youth coaches often help out in both the junior and high schools teaching all levels of rugby.

The club also provides stewards for the Royal Manx Agricultural Show and Peelstock.

In 2014 the club will also provide stewarding for the revamped Peel Day which is held in Sunset City on the Mad Sunday of TT week.

== Tour ==
The club as a whole have always toured since it was formed with the exception of when there was no senior team. The first tour since the resurrection was in 2013 when they toured Chester. The senior side played in the Chester 7's tournament over the whole weekend.

The club are due to tour Wigan in 2014 with a match scheduled against a select Wigan RUFC team. This will take place over Easter weekend and a confirmed party of thirty club players and members are due to travel.

In 2013 the first youth tour took place with Western Vikings u9's touring Warrington. Players, parents and coaches all came together, and they played several games on tour.

== See also ==
- Rugby union in the Isle of Man
- Isle of Man Sport
- Castletown Rugby Club
- Douglas Rugby Club
- Southern Nomads Rugby Club
- Vagabonds Rugby Club
