= World Tinbath Championship =

Annual event on the Isle of Man

The World Tinbath Championship takes place annually in Castletown Harbour on the Isle of Man. On 21 July 2007, the 36th edition of the competition took place.

The event is organised by The Castletown Ale Drinkers Society and sponsored by local breweries, with support from the Isle of Man Department of Tourism. It raises money for local charities. Each year there are over 100 competitors and teams from the Isle of Man and elsewhere. Although the event is run as a fun day, the competition is fierce, and strict rules are in place to ensure a fair and safe event.

Categories in the Championship are: a Men's Race, Ladies' Race, Snake Race (teams), the Rope Slide, and a Flying Competition in which entrants attempt to fly over the harbour with varying degrees of success in homemade flying machines.
