= Castletown, Isle of Man =

Town on the Isle of Man

Coordinates: 54.074°N 4.654°W

Castletown: Manx: Balley Chashtal
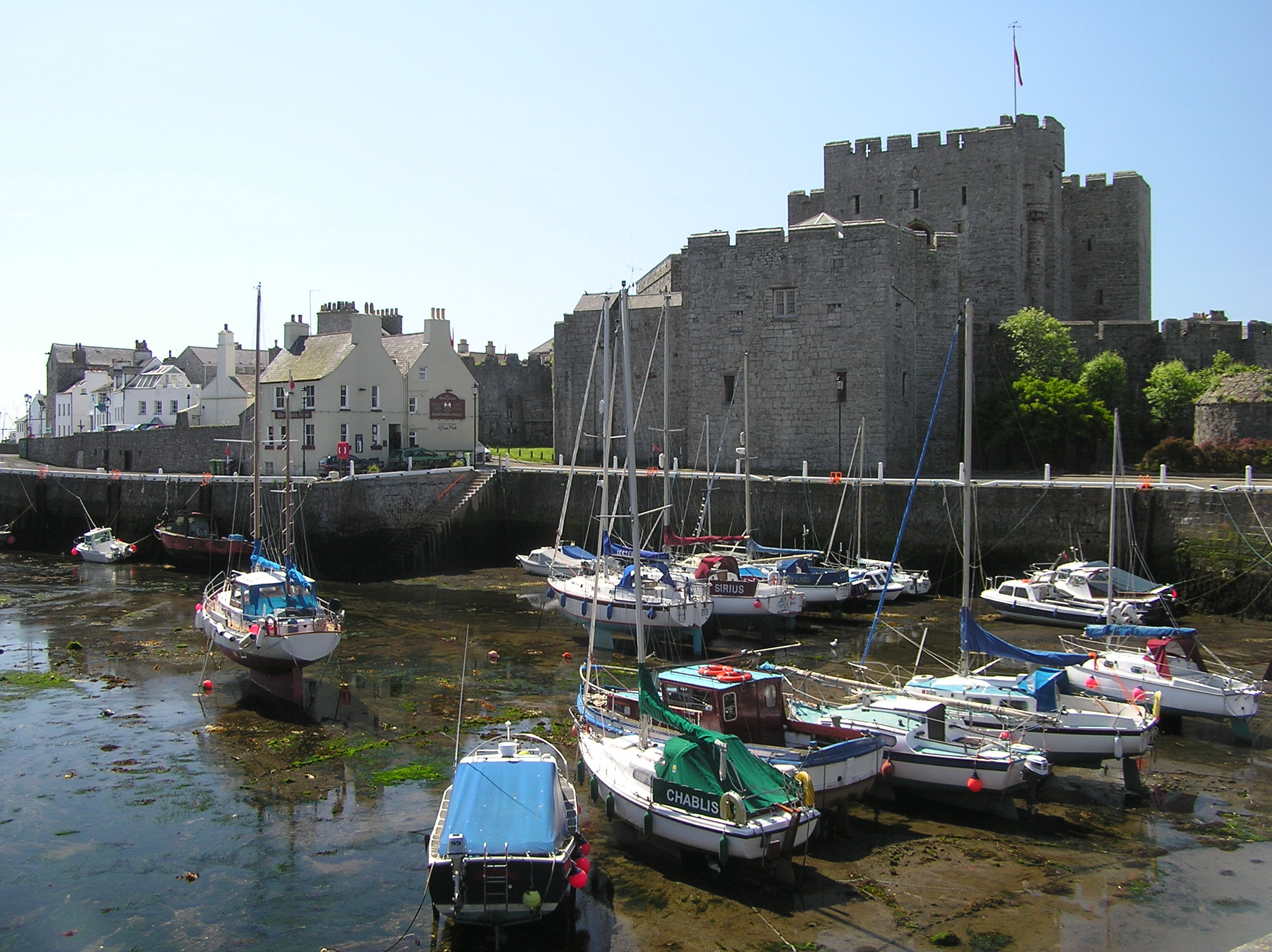
- Castle Rushen seen across Castletown Harbour at low tide

- Location within the Isle of Man
- Population: 3,206
- OS grid reference: SC263675
  - Douglas: 8.9 miles (14 km) ENE
- Parish: Malew
- Sheading: Rushen
- Crown dependency: Isle of Man
- Post town: ISLE OF MAN
- Postcode district: IM9
- Dialling code: 01624
- Police: Isle of Man
- Fire: Isle of Man
- Ambulance: Isle of Man
- House of Keys: Arbory, Castletown & Malew

Castletown (Manx: Balley y Chashtal, pronounced [ˈbalʲə ˈxaʃtʃəl]) is a town in the Isle of Man, geographically within the historical parish of Malew but administered separately. Lying at the south of the island, it was the Manx capital until 1869. The centre of town is dominated by Castle Rushen, a well-preserved medieval castle, originally built for a Viking king.

== History ==
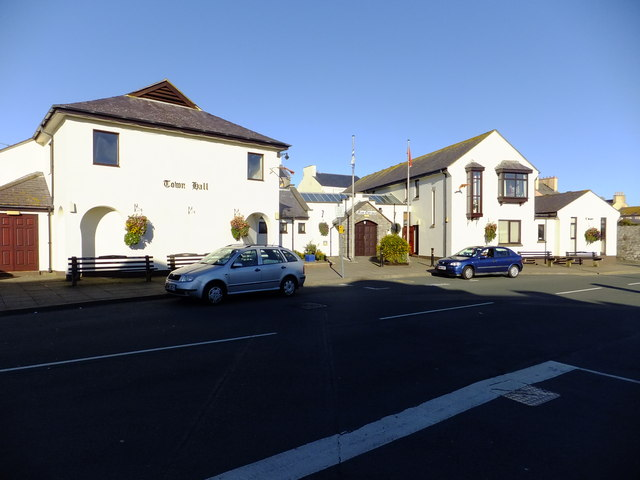
Castletown Civic Centre

Castletown is the former capital of the Isle of Man and site of the Tynwald, and can trace its roots back to 1090. The town has narrow streets and small fishing cottages. Castle Rushen (at the centre of the town) was originally built in 1265 for a Norse king, then fortified and added to by successive rulers between the 13th and 16th centuries. The castle has been used as a fortress, a residence for the Kings and Lords of Mann, the site of a mint and even a prison (past prisoners include a bishop and two newspaper editors). The town and castle were the site of a number of sieges and battles, especially during the years when control of the island passed between the Norse, Scots and English. Robert the Bruce laid siege to and captured the castle three times.

The history of the town and island is illustrated in four Manx National Heritage sites in the centre of Castletown: Castle Rushen, the Nautical Museum (in the secret passage-filled home of inventor, politician, banker and probable smuggler George Quayle), the Old Grammar School (originally a church from 1200 AD) and the Old House of Keys.

Fishing boats still go out to fish from the harbour. Commercial traffic to the port ended in the 1970s, although there has been an ongoing expansion of financial and industrial businesses in the area. The first telephones on the Isle of Man appeared in Castletown in 1901.

Castletown Civic Centre opened in 1989.

== Geography and geology ==
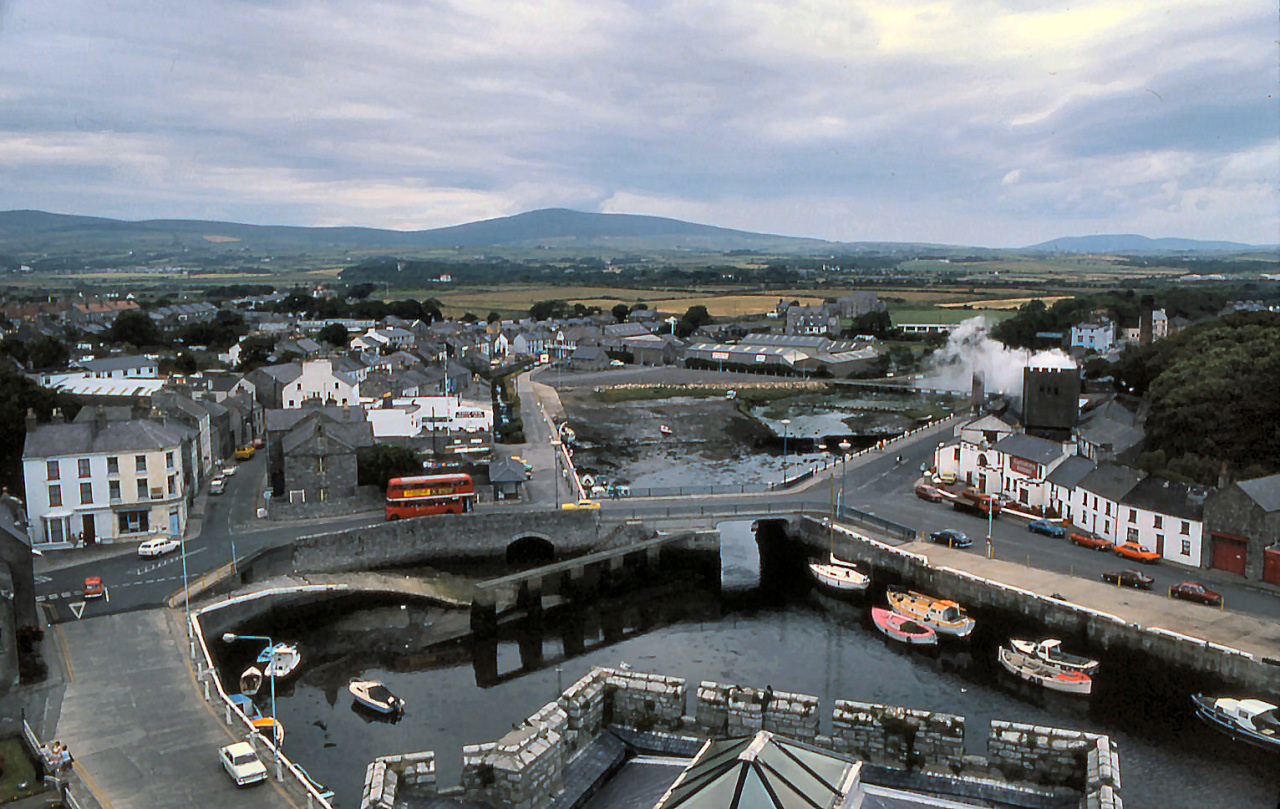
Middle & Inner Harbours

The town lies on the northwest side of Castletown Bay. The opposite shore of the bay is the west coast of the distinctively-shaped Langness Peninsula. To the north-east are Ronaldsway Airport and industrial zone, and the village of Ballasalla; to the north-west the villages of Ballabeg and Colby; and to the west Port St Mary and Port Erin.

The older parts of the town are largely built of local grey limestone. At Scarlett, a short distance to the south of the town, there are the remains of an ancient volcano and various other features such as fossils and thick sheets of limestone.

=== Climate ===
Climate data for Ronaldsway (1991–2020 averages)
Month	Jan	Feb	Mar	Apr	May	Jun	Jul	Aug	Sep	Oct	Nov	Dec	Year
Mean daily maximum °C (°F)	8.5 (47.3)	8.4 (47.1)	9.4 (48.9)	11.5 (52.7)	14.3 (57.7)	16.5 (61.7)	18.2 (64.8)	18.2 (64.8)	16.6 (61.9)	13.8 (56.8)	11.1 (52.0)	9.2 (48.6)	13.0 (55.4)
Mean daily minimum °C (°F)	4.3 (39.7)	3.9 (39.0)	4.5 (40.1)	5.8 (42.4)	8.1 (46.6)	10.6 (51.1)	12.5 (54.5)	12.7 (54.9)	11.4 (52.5)	9.2 (48.6)	6.7 (44.1)	4.9 (40.8)	7.9 (46.2)
Average precipitation mm (inches)	82.5 (3.25)	65.5 (2.58)	62.5 (2.46)	55.1 (2.17)	54.6 (2.15)	62.4 (2.46)	59.1 (2.33)	67.4 (2.65)	70.6 (2.78)	103.3 (4.07)	105.2 (4.14)	95.0 (3.74)	882.9 (34.76)
Average precipitation days	14.2	11.4	10.9	10.0	9.8	9.3	10.2	10.8	11.2	13.4	15.8	14.7	141.8
Mean monthly sunshine hours	54.6	82.8	127.3	181.9	235.3	213.4	203.5	190.2	145.9	105.4	63.9	47.0	1,651.2

== Demographics ==
The Isle of Man Census 2011 lists the town's population as 3,097 (2006: 3,109) It is the fourth largest town on the island, after Douglas, Ramsey and Peel, but is also smaller than Onchan and Port Erin, which have the status of villages.

== Politics ==
Castletown is, along with Peel, Ramsey, and formerly Douglas (now designated a city) one of four town local authorities. They were all designated as towns by the Town Act 1852. Castletown became a local authority in 1883.

Until 2016 Castletown was also a House of Keys constituency, electing one Member of the House of Keys (MHK). The town's representative for 30 years until 2011 was Tony Brown, who was the Chief Minister of the Isle of Man after the 2006 Manx general election. He retired in 2011 and was replaced as MHK for Castletown by Richard Ronan. Since 2016 Castletown has been part of the Arbory, Castletown & Malew constituency.

In 1874, the House of Keys moved from Castletown to Douglas.

== Transport ==
=== Roads ===
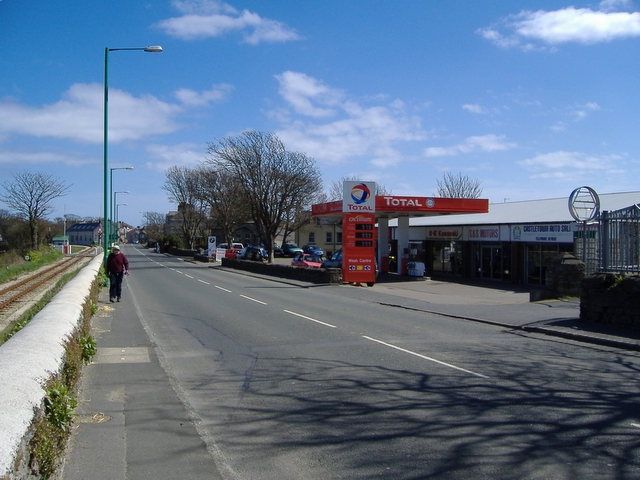
Alexandra (Bypass) Road

The A3 road connects Castletown with Ramsey via St John's, while the A5 road (also known as New Castletown Road as opposed to the Old Castletown Road which takes a more rural route nearer the coast) connects the town with Douglas to the north-east and Port Erin to the west. The A25 road was the historical route to Douglas and is now bypassed by the A5. There are free electric car charging stations available in a car park in the centre of the town. The town has several car parks including one above the harbour close to the old school house, to the rear of the Castle Arms and off Victoria Road as well as dedicated parking for the local bank, supermarkets and the railway station.

=== Buses ===
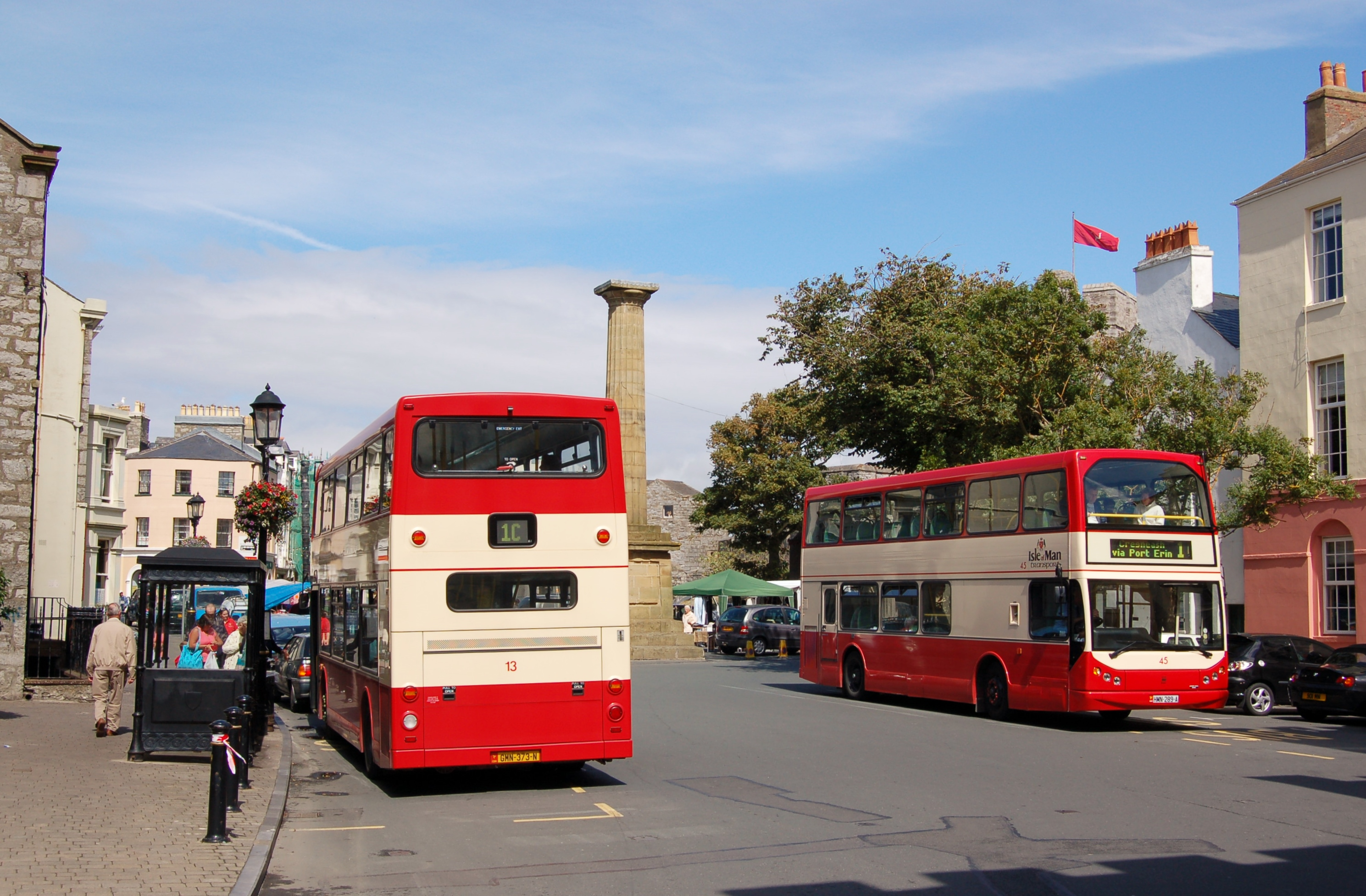
On The Parade

Bus services operate through the town to Douglas, Port St Mary and Port Erin using route numbers 1, 2, 11 and 12; these run about every twenty minutes on weekdays and Saturdays with a less frequent service at weekends and after 6.00 pm. Some of these services (1c and 11b) do not run through the town but use the bypass road. These routes are the island's busiest, in part because they also serve Ronaldsway Airport just outside the town. A late evening service also operates on Friday and Saturday evenings, called the Hullad Oie (Night Owl), which charges premium fare rates. There are also occasional buses to Peel (Service No. 8) via Foxdale; all these buses are within the island's transport network Bus Vannin, a government-run service which replaced the railway-operated Isle of Man Road Services in 1976.

=== Railway ===
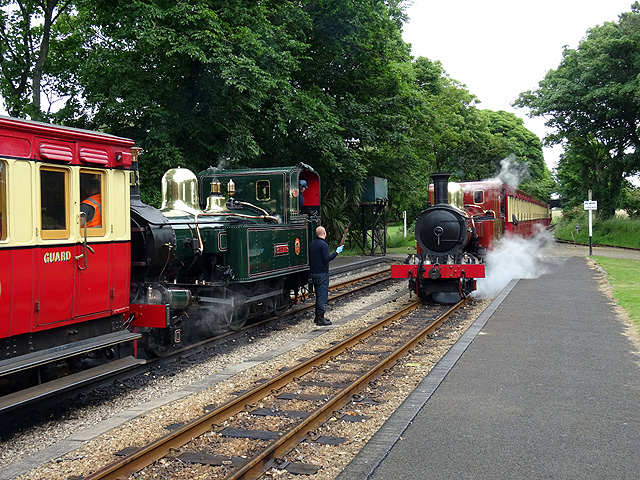
Castletown Trains Crossing

The town is also served by Castletown railway station, on the sole remaining section of the Isle of Man Railway, a 3 ft (914 mm) narrow gauge steam-operated railway which now runs 15 miles from Douglas to Port Erin. The railway station is on the northeasterly edge of the town next to Poulsom Park and playing fields, and was at one time used to transport beer from the Castletown Brewery as well as cattle and other livestock; remnants of the cattle dock are still visible at the railway station, which is open seasonally between March and November as well as at weekends around Christmas; there is a small volunteer group, the Friends of Castletown Railway Station, who tend to the area in association with the Isle of Man Steam Railway Supporters' Association, a local charity.

==== Castletown Railway Station ====
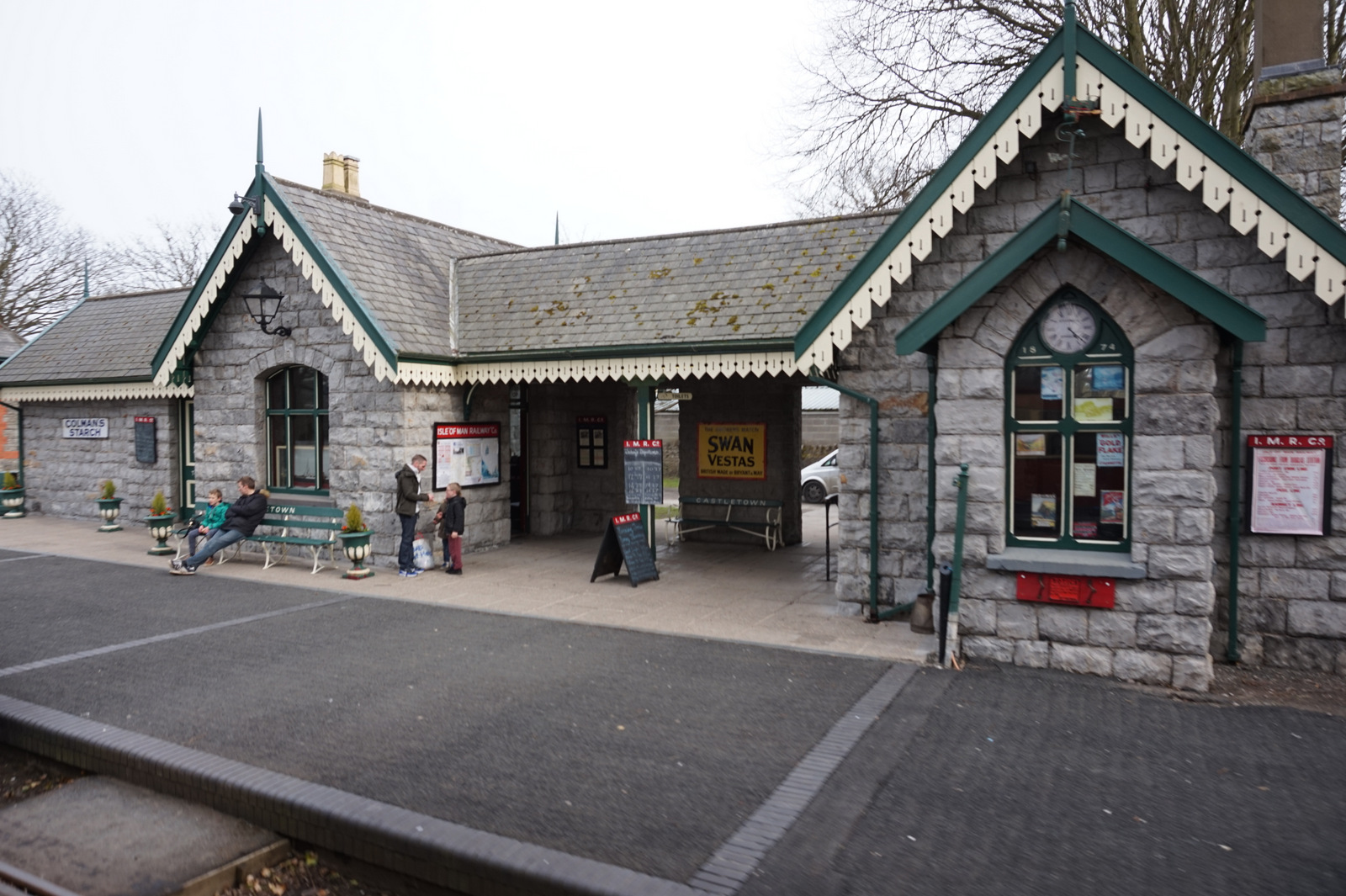
Castletown Railway Station

Constructed in 1874 from locally sourced limestone from Scarlett Point, it is the sole surviving structure from the opening of the line; it was extensively refurbished in 1993/1994 to original form. It is open seasonally and many people's first encounter with the town is their arrival at the station.

=== Air ===
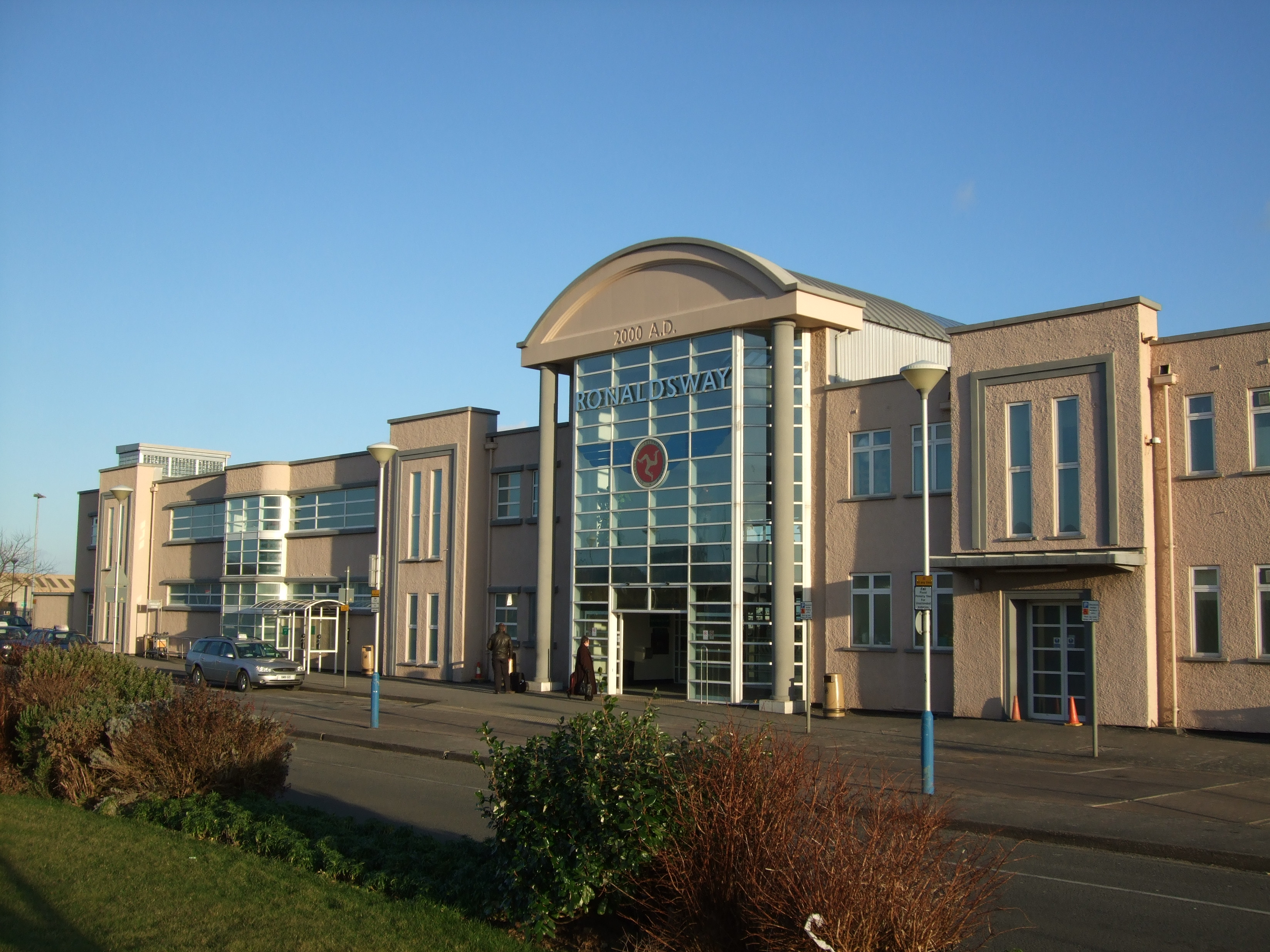
Ronaldsway Airport

The island's only commercial airport, Ronaldsway Airport, is 2 km (just over one mile) northeast of the town and is served by both Bus Vannin and Castletown railway station as well as local taxi services. There is a closer railway station, small request stop at Ronaldsway Halt. The airport runways and aprons spread over the area to the edge of the grounds of King William's College and close to the Janet's Corner local authority housing estate. The airport was first used as an airfield in 1928, with passenger services to the United Kingdom commencing in 1933. Commissioned as HMS Urley (Manx for Eagle) by the Admiralty in June 1944, with accounts handled by HMS Valkyrie, flying recommenced on 15 July 1944. The terminal building was significantly modified, reopening in its present form in 2000.

=== Footpaths ===
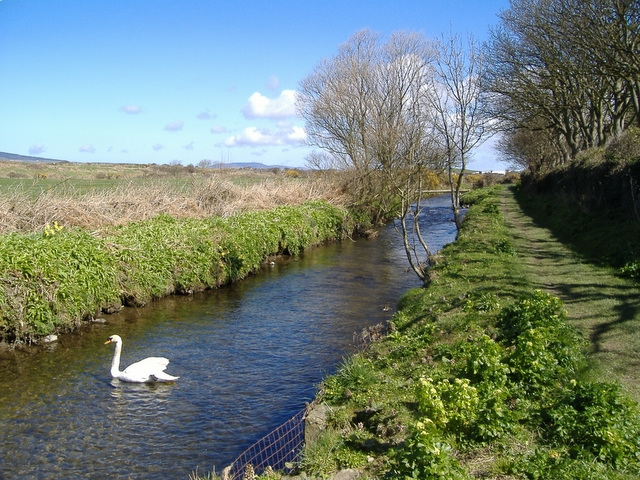
Silverburn River Path

- The southern end of the Millennium Way long-distance footpath is at Castletown close to the entrance to Poulsom Park and is signposted to that effect near Alexander Bridge beside the roundabout for the bypass road.
- The Raad ny Foillan ("way of the gull") long distance coastal footpath, opened in 1986 which was designated as Heritage Year on the island, and runs along the coast in the town. It is 102 miles (164 km) in length and forms a complete loop around the coast, waymarked with signs showing a gull on a blue background.
- Shorter paths around the town included a dedicated surfaced path around the perimeter of Poulsom Park and a trail between the town and Scarlett Point which is part of the coastal footpath and serves the visitor centre there.

=== Politics ===
- Illiam Dhone (1608–1663) a local nationalist and politician, executed at Hango Hill outside the town.
- Major John Taubman (1746 in Castletown – 1822 in Braddan) a Manx politician, he entered the House of Keys in 1799. He served as Speaker from 1799 until his death in 1822
- John Ready (1777 in Castletown – 1845 in Castletown) a British army officer who served as Lieutenant Governor of the island (1832–1845)
- John Moore Jeffcott QC (1817 in Castletown – 1892 in Castletown) a Manx advocate who became High Bailiff of Castletown and a Member of the House of Keys for the constituency of Castletown.
- Sir Joseph Qualtrough (1885 in Castletown – 1960) Speaker of the House of Keys from 1937 to 1960.

=== Members of the House of Keys and elections ===
Year	Election	Turnout	Candidates
1903	General election	Unknown	Colonel George Moore, (257 votes, elected); D. D. Rees, 135 votes
1919	By-election	Unknown	Sir Joseph Davidson Qualtrough CBE, elected; James Robinson Corrin; Possibly other candidates
1919	General election		Sir Joseph Davidson Qualtrough (elected unopposed)
1924	General election		Sir Joseph Davidson Qualtrough (elected unopposed)
1929	General election		Sir Joseph Davidson Qualtrough (elected unopposed)
1934	General election		Sir Joseph Davidson Qualtrough (elected unopposed)
1946	General election	Unknown	Sir Joseph Davidson Qualtrough (elected)
1951	General election	Unknown	Sir Joseph Davidson Qualtrough (elected)
1956	General election	Unknown	Sir Joseph Davidson Qualtrough (elected); Qualtrough's death led to a by-election on 17 February 1960:
1960	By-election	73.4%	Thomas Harold Colebourn (494 votes, elected); Joseph P Qualtrough (347 votes); James Blackburn (156 votes)
1962	General election	83.3%	Thomas Harold Colebourn (586 votes, elected); Colin L P Vereker (417 votes); (Colin Vereker became Viscount Gort in 1975.): Mrs M Faragher (76 votes)
1966	General election	74.1%	Colin Vereker (685 votes, elected); Thomas Harold Colebourn (309 votes); J R G Crellin (301 votes); Possibly other candidates
1971	General election	81.3%	Elspeth Quayle, elected; Colin Vereker; Commodore Roland Watkin, RN, CBE
1976	General election	80.2%	Elspeth Quayle (893 votes, elected); Colin Vereker (Viscount Gort) (405 votes); Clifford Peach (315 votes)
1981	General election	68.7%	Tony Brown OBE (997 votes, elected); Harold Lewin Kelly (540 votes)
1986	General election	67.3%	Tony Brown (995 votes, elected); J. K. Gale (487 votes)
1991	General election		Tony Brown (elected unopposed)
1996	General election	67.2%	Tony Brown (876 votes, elected); Elsie Pickard (467 votes); Carol Edge (102 votes)
2001	General election		Tony Brown (elected unopposed)
2006	General election	62.2%	Tony Brown (915 votes, elected); Roy Redmayne (Liberal Vannin), 335 votes
2011	General election	65.7%	Richard Ronan, 520 votes, elected; Jason Moorhouse, 479 votes; Mahendra Patel, 280 votes; Colin Leather, 108 votes; Carol Quine, 43 votes; David Pownall, 33 votes

In 2016 the constituency was abolished.

== Education ==
=== Primary ===
There is one primary school located in the town, Victoria Road School, which originally opened as a boys' school in 1895, with a girls' school in Hope Street. The old grammar school in the town, which later became a chapel, is now an exhibit of a Victorian period schoolroom, part of the Story of Mann. This is open to the public between Easter and November and can be found close to the castle and the Old House of Keys.

=== Secondary ===
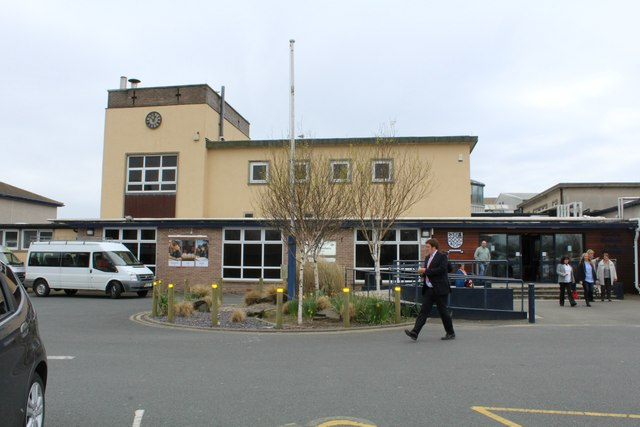
Castle Rushen High School

Castle Rushen High School, a co-educational secondary state school in the south-west of the town.

=== Private ===
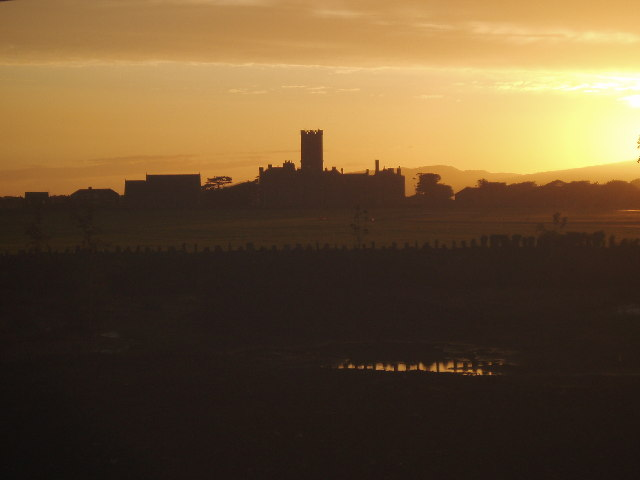
Sunset, King William's College

King William's College is a private school. Founded in 1668 with funds from the Bishop Barrow Trust, it opened in 1833 with 46 boys. It is now co-educational, with about 500 pupils. The college has two sites in the town: the main estate is near the shore of Castletown Bay at the end of the main airport runway, and The Buchan School, the college's junior school, is in the Westhill area of Castletown, about 2 km (1 mi) from the main campus.

== Churches ==
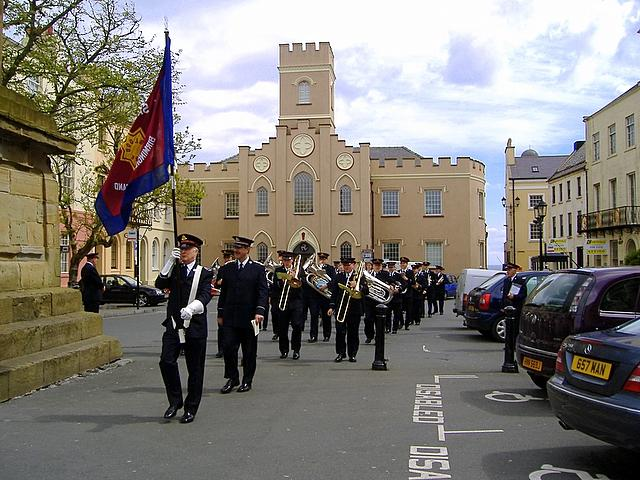
Birmingham Citadel Band. Old St Mary's Church (background)

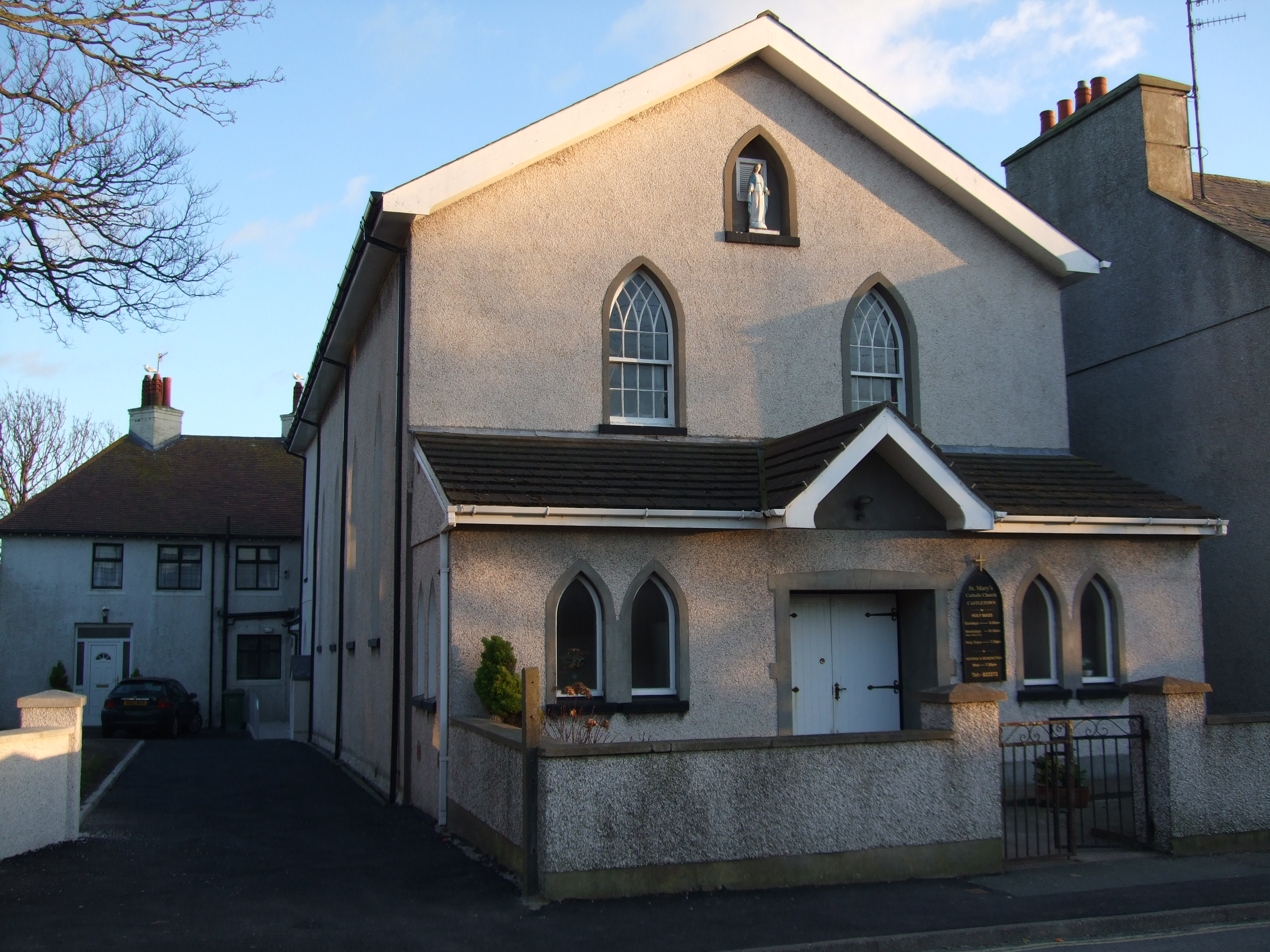
St Mary's Catholic Church

=== Church of England ===
On the town square is Old St Mary's Church, the original parish and garrison church, which is now office accommodation. It once had a spire, but this was lost in the early 1900s.

The new St Mary's Church is located on the harbour. It was consecrated in 1985 when the congregation moved from the Garrison (Old St Mary's) Church in Castletown Square. The new church can be found in Hope Street, to the side of Thirtle Bridge. Known as St Mary's on the Harbour, it is the parish church of Castletown.

Malew Church is located about one mile north of the town on the A3 road towards St John's, a road which forms part of the Billown Circuit. The church's name is derived from its original dedication to the early Celtic saint, Saint Moluag, who is said to have converted the Picts to Christianity in the west of Scotland. Malew Church has its own graveyard, unlike the churches in the town; the minor bend around the church grounds has the title Church Bends on the racing circuit.

St Thomas' chapel is the school chapel at King William's College, and was built in 1878, and consecrated on 28 January 1879. Designed by local architect James Cowle, it features a scissor-braced roof, canopied stalls, wall paintings, and stained glass windows. Windows commemorate T. E. Brown, an old boy of the college. The chapel is staffed by a Church of England priest who is employed by the college and licensed by the Bishop of Sodor and Man.

=== Catholic ===
St Mary's Roman Catholic Church is on Bowling Green Road, near Janet's Corner. It was built in the 1820s; it was the first post-Reformation Catholic Church to be built on the island. It is the third church in the town to be dedicated to St Mary the Virgin ("Our Lady of Rushen"). It has two intricate and colourful Celtic Revival/Art Nouveau windows, which depict the Annunciation and the Resurrection. These were made by the Clarke Brothers of Dublin.

=== Methodist ===
Castletown Methodist Church on Arbory Street, founded in 1932, is part of the Methodist Church in the Isle of Man, which in turn is part of the British Methodist Connexion. It can trace its history back to the visits of the founder of Methodism John Wesley to the town in the 18th century. It is sometimes known locally as Arbory Street, formerly to distinguish it from the Malew Street chapel when the former was the Wesleyan Methodist and the latter the Primitive Methodist Chapel.

== Sport ==
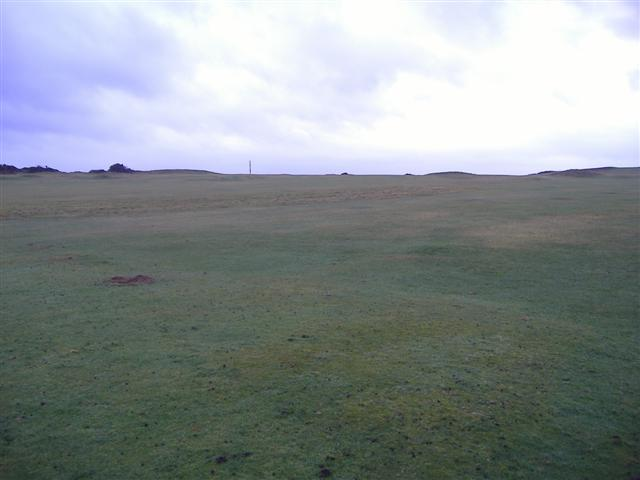
Castletown Golf Links

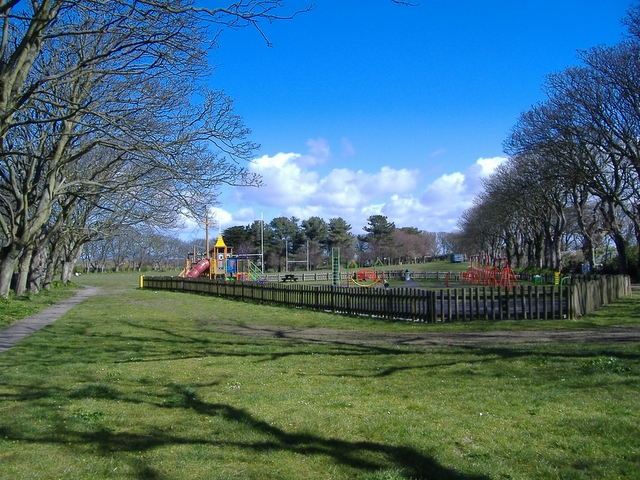
Poulsom Park, Castletown R.U.F.C.

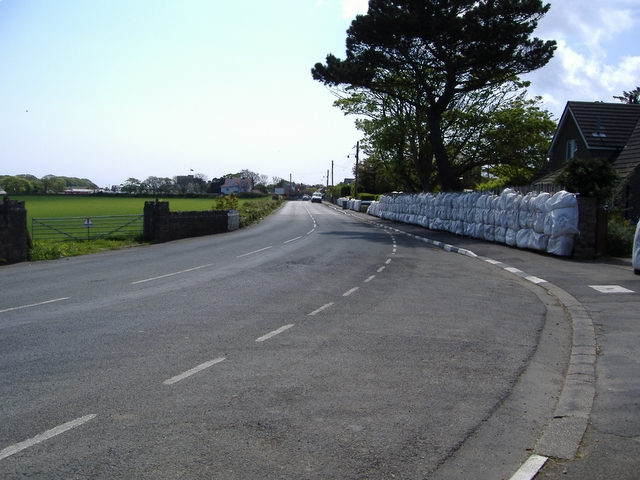
Stadium Corner, Castletown

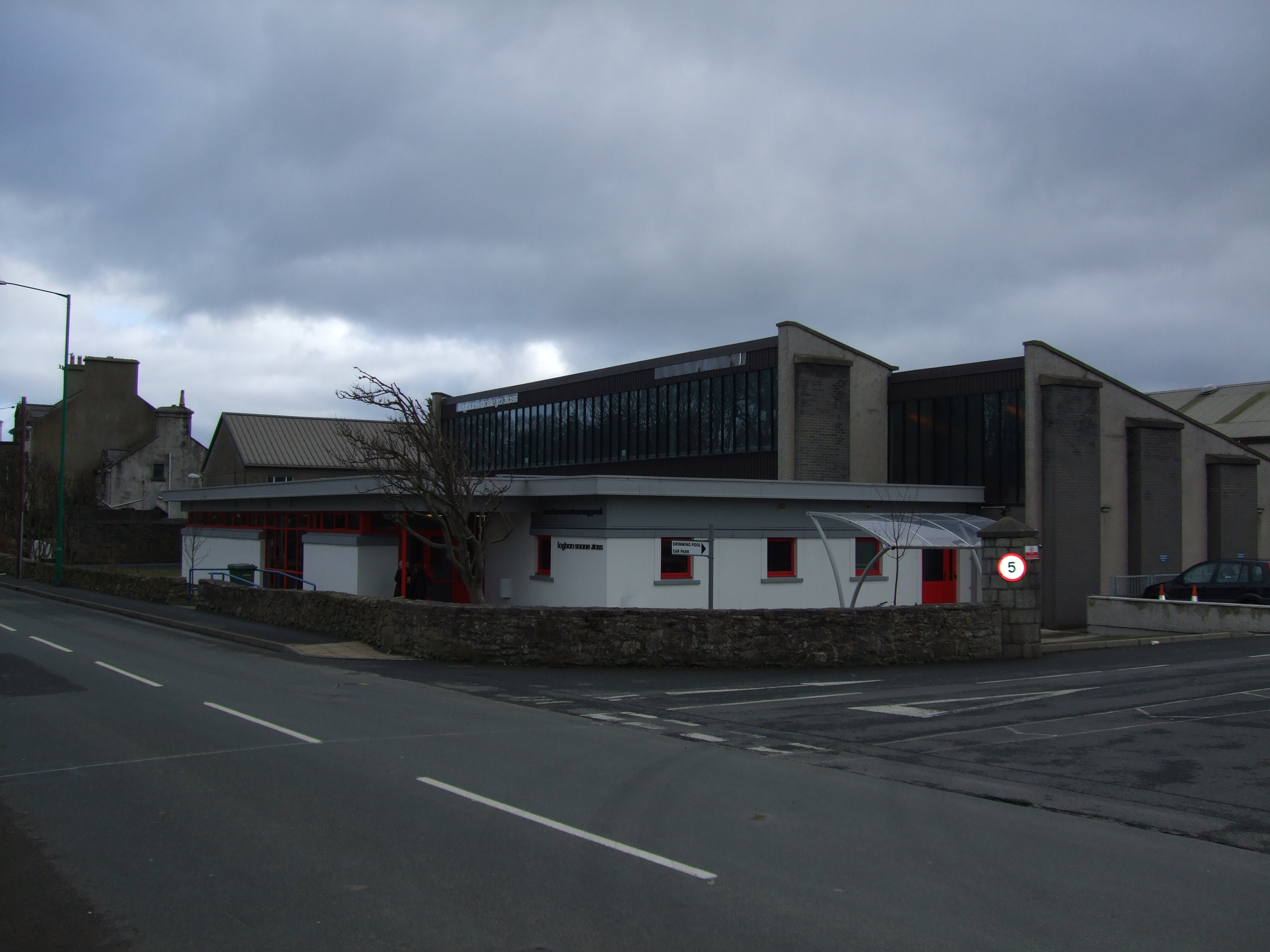
Southern Swimming Pool

=== Bowls ===
Castletown Bowling Club is located at the Crofts.

=== Cricket ===
Castletown cricket club is based at King William's College and is a member of the Isle of Man Cricket Association.

=== Football ===
Castletown Metropolitan F.C. play in the Isle of Man Football League and are based at the Castletown Football Stadium, Malew Road. Formed in 1904, the club is one of the most successful on the Isle of Man. They have been champions of the Isle of Man League eight times, including three consecutive seasons from 1922–23 to 1924-25 and won the Manx F.A. Cup seven times.

=== Golf ===
Castletown Golf & Country Club is located on the Langness Peninsula. It is a tournament golf course, and is a Top 100 course designed by Old Tom Morris and redesigned by Mackenzie Ross. The 17th hole has the unusual feature of a drive over the Irish Sea. The links has hosted, among other events, the PGA Cup (1979), Europro Tour 2002, Manx Classic Pro Am and the Duke of York Young Champions Trophy in 2003 and again in 2005.

=== Hockey ===
Castletown Hockey Club are the only hockey club in the south of the Isle of Man. They field three men's, four women's and six mixed teams plus 10 junior sides. They train at Castle Rushen High School, which is also their home pitch.

=== Racing ===
The Billown Circuit motor cycling course has its start line in the town. The course is home to the Southern 100, a motorcycle racing event held on the Isle of Man in July of each year. The event was first held in 1955, when there were three races for different classes of motorcycles; the current calendar includes twelve races for various classes. The paddock, clubhouse and race control are all located on the outskirts of the town.

=== Rugby ===
There are two rugby union football clubs in the town; both play in the Manx Shield:

Castletown R.U.F.C. are based at Poulsom Park. The club now has permanent changing facilities. These were officially opened in October 2006 and built with the support of the Rugby Football Union (RFU), Manx Lottery Trust, Manx Sports Council, Castletown Commissioners and the members of the team. With the newly formed Castletown Rugby Union Football Club Limited, the club has secured the tenure on the pitch at Poulsom Park, having taken on a lease from the Castletown Commissioners.

Southern Nomads R.U.F.C. are based at King William's College.

=== Swimming ===
Southern Swimming Pool is a 25-metre, four lane short course pool.

=== Tennis ===
Next to the bowling green is Castletown Lawn Tennis Club with teams in local leagues. The club won 6 leagues in the 2010–11 season.

=== World Championship Tin Bath Races ===
The World Tinbath Championship is an annual event takes place in the middle harbour; it is organised by the Castletown Ale Drinkers' Society and sponsored by local breweries, with support from the Isle of Man Department of Community, Culture and Leisure and further sponsorship from local radio station Three FM. It raises money for local charities. Each year there are over 100 competitors and teams from the Isle of Man and elsewhere. In 2011 the event celebrated its 40th anniversary.

=== 2011 Commonwealth Youth Games ===
The "culture day" prior to the closing ceremony of the 2011 Commonwealth Youth Games was held in Castletown on 12 September 2011, with competitors all travelling by steam train to the town square, where a number of attractions were laid on.

== Places of interest ==
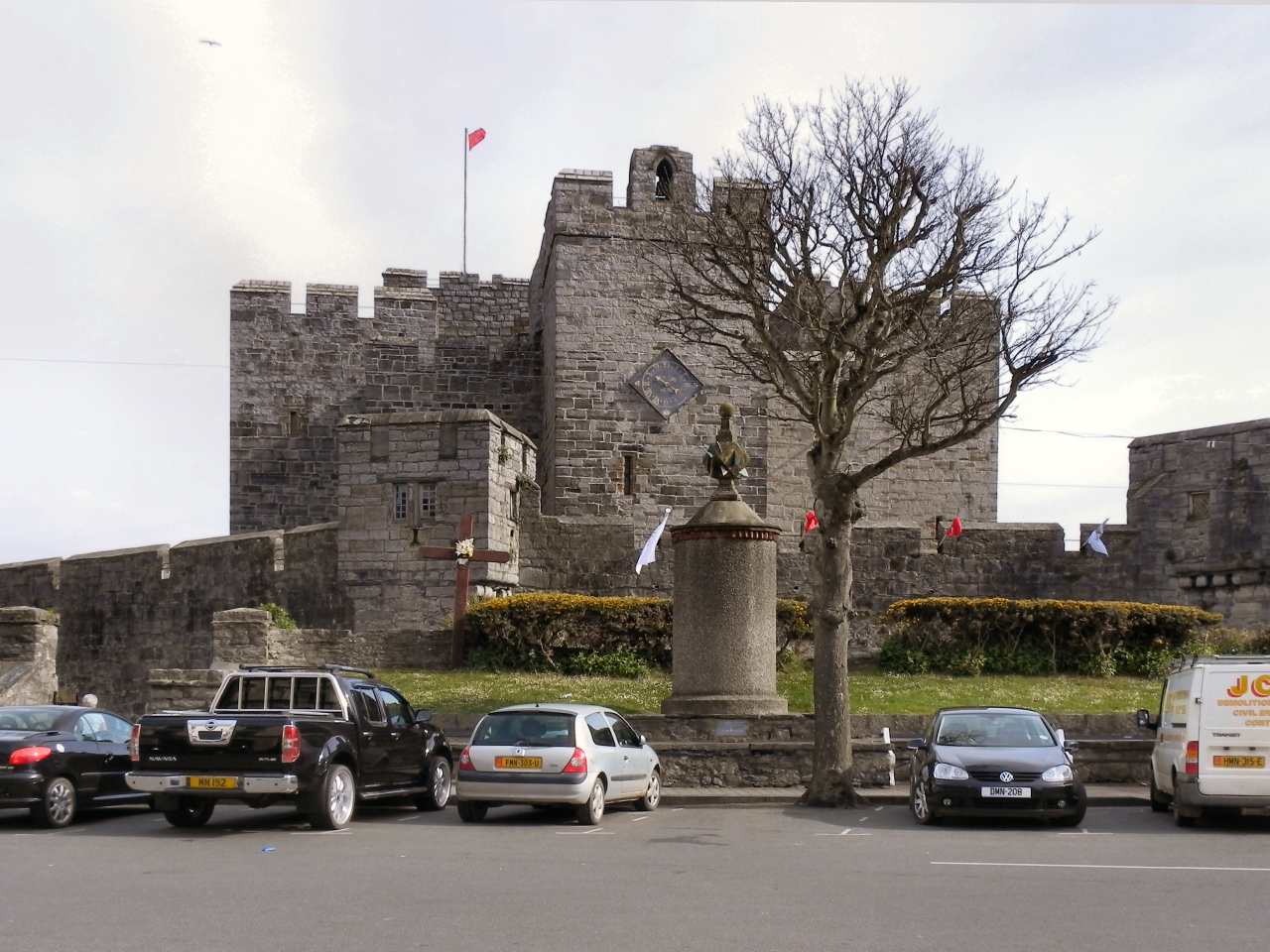
Castle Rushen

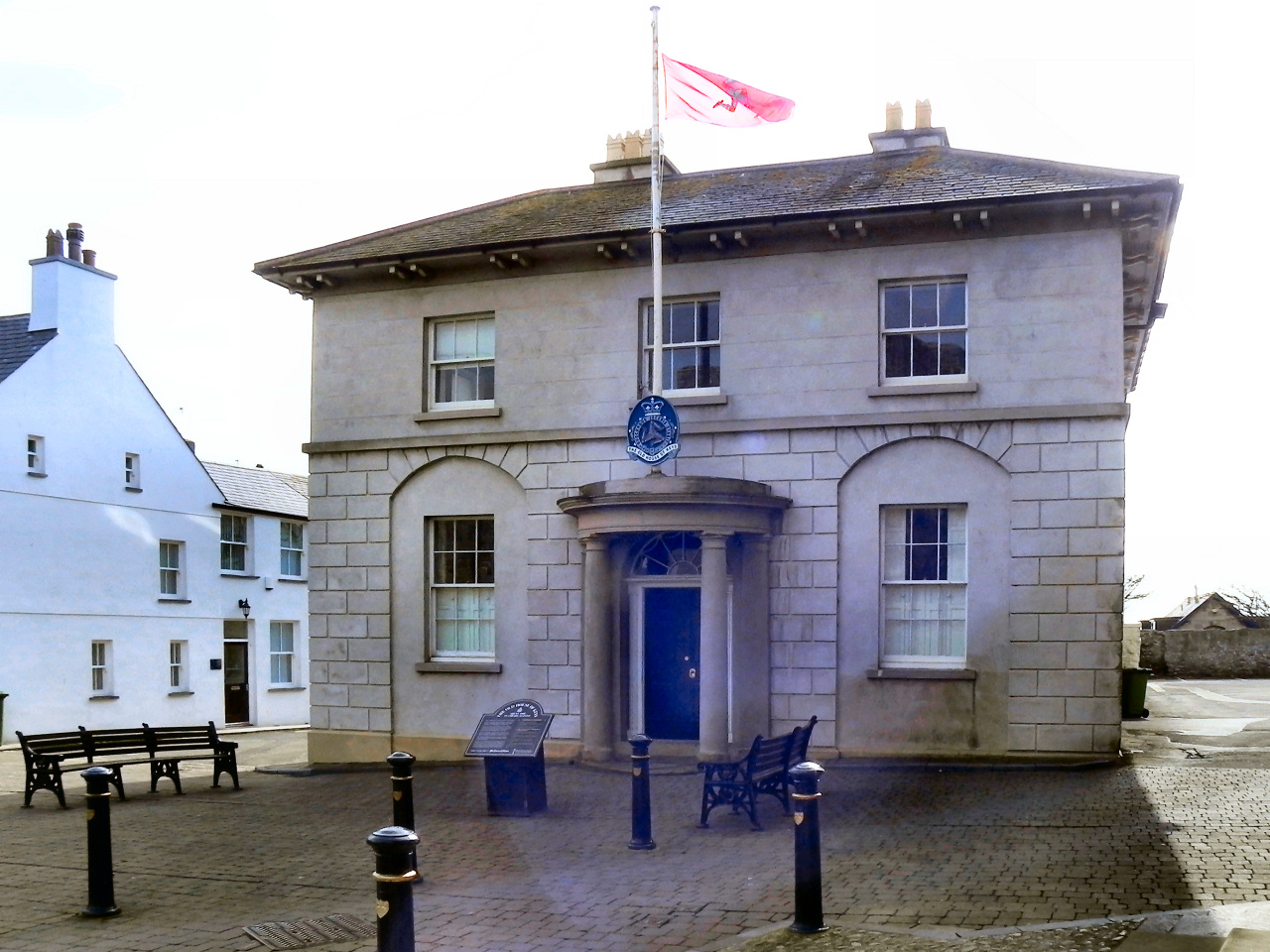
Old House of Keys

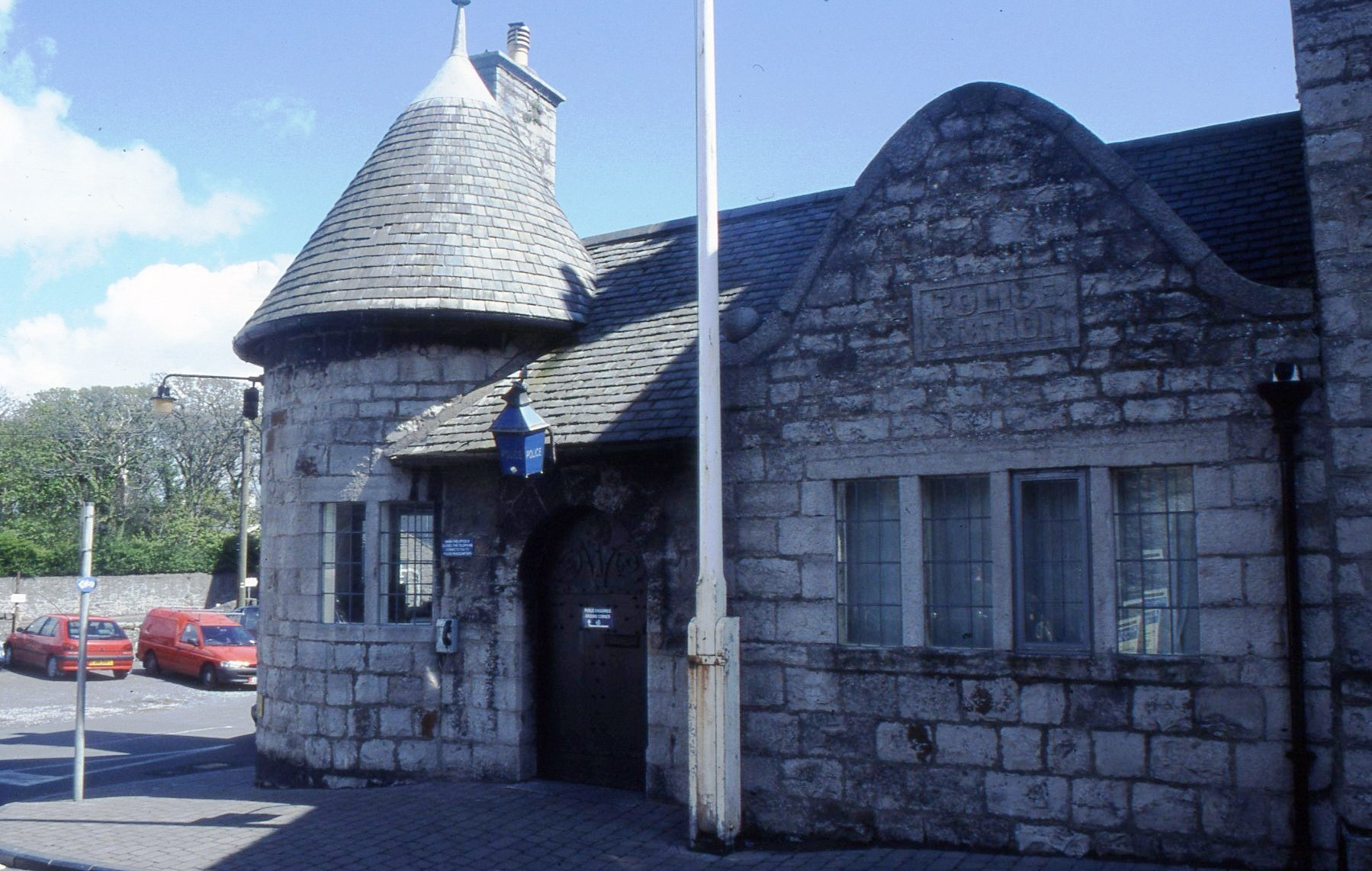
The Old Police Station

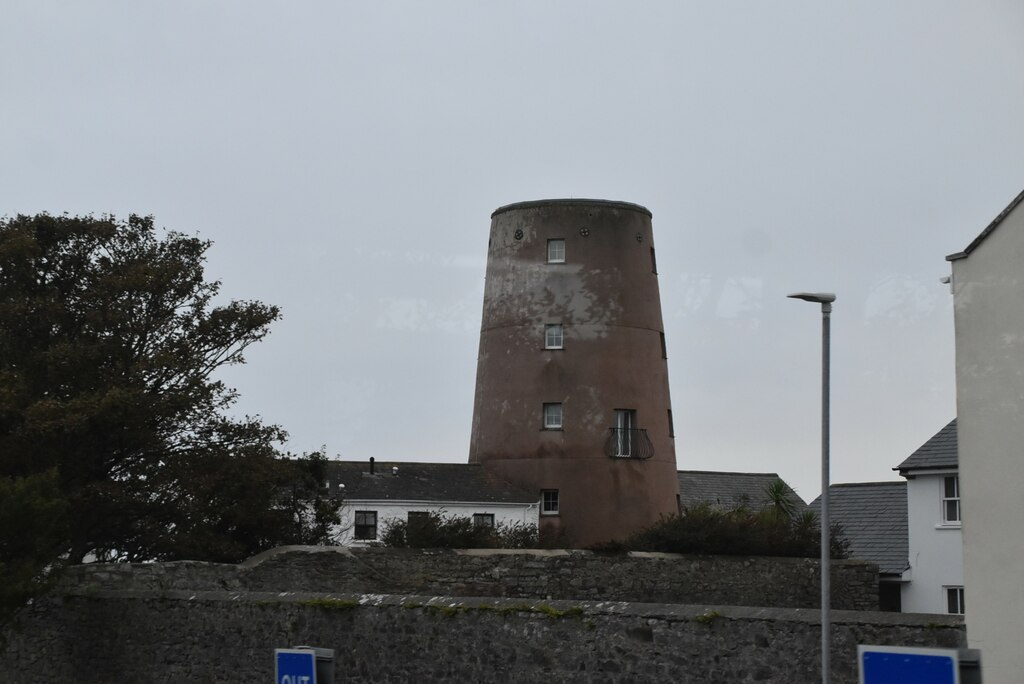
The Witches Mill

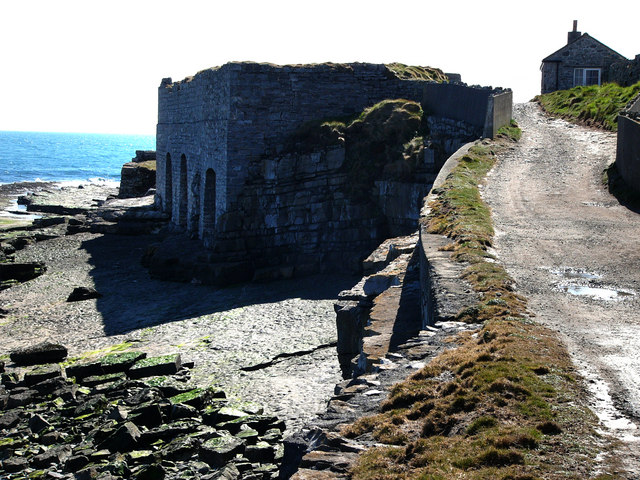
Scarlett Point Lime Kilns

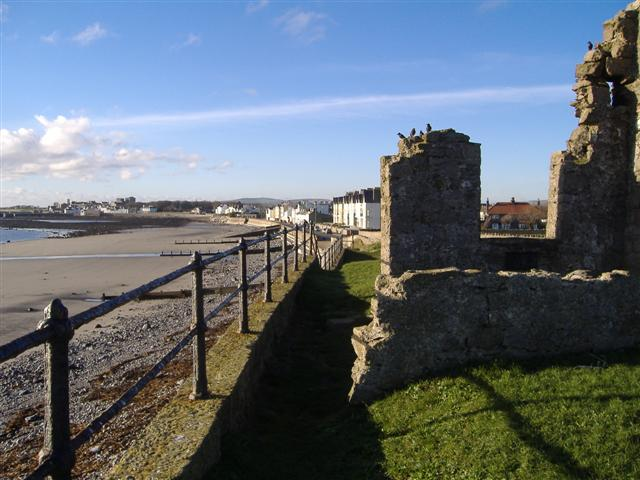
Hango Hill

Much of the attraction of Castletown is in the quality of its many 18th- and early 19th-century buildings, many constructed in the local silver-grey limestone. The town centre retains its early layout, echoing the cluster of houses around the Castle, the harbour and the military parade ground, is still used as a market place. The interested visitor can still identify the original building plots, and the crofts attached to them, which have given their name to a residential area close to the town centre.

=== Castle Rushen ===
A medieval castle which towers over the Market Square to the south-east and the harbour to the north-east. HMS Rushen Castle, a former Castle-class corvette of the Royal Navy, was named after the castle. It is the focal point of the town and is open to the public between Easter and October.

=== The Old House of Keys ===
This was the location of Tynwald, the Manx parliament, from 1821 until it moved in 1874 to Douglas. The house was renovated in 2000 and is run as a museum by Manx National Heritage. Tynwald used to meet in Castletown except on Tynwald Day, when it traditionally met (and still meets) on Tynwald Hill in St John's.

=== The Old Grammar School ===
This is next to the harbour to the rear of the town square at the side of a large car park. It was originally built as a chapel about 1190–1230. The building ceased to be a school in the 1930s and is now a museum exhibit opened seasonally in connection with the other Story of Mann sites in the town.

=== The Nautical Museum ===
Also known as the Peggy Story in recent times, the Nautical Museum is in Bridge Street opened in 1951; the main focus of the museum is an 18th-century yacht, the Peggy (Peggy of Castletown), housed in the boat cellar, where she has been since the 19th century. She had been bricked up and forgotten before being rediscovered by workmen. In early 2015, Peggy was moved to Douglas for conservation in a climate-controlled facility. The Nautical Museum is based in the house of local inventor (and politician, trader and possible smuggler) George Quayle, who had the house built with secret passages, doorways, and a replica of a captain's cabin. Quayle had a bank next door at Bridge House, known as George Quayle & Co. and also known as the Isle of Man Bank Company and Quayle's Bank. Opening the safe involved posting a series of cannonballs, which ran through a mechanism invented by Quayle.

=== Castletown Police Station ===
Located opposite the entrance to the castle, adjacent to the Castle Arms (locally referred to as the "Glue Pot" for many years) public house and was designed by the noted Arts & Crafts architect Baillie Scott, the building is now disused.

=== The Witchcraft Museum (Witches Mill) ===
This was in existence in the town for a short period at the Witches Mill which has since been redeveloped as flats. It was operated by the self-proclaimed witch Gerald Gardner who ran it under the title Folklore Centre of Superstition and Witchcraft, becoming a familiar figure in the town.

=== The Smelt Monument ===
An unusual monument in the Parade in the town centre, built to commemorate the life of Cornelius Smelt, the first royally appointed Lieutenant Governor of the Isle of Man, who died in 1832. Work on the monument began in 1836, and ceased the following year.

=== Hango Hill ===
Hango Hill is the execution site of Illiam Dhone, is on the outskirts of the town on the road to Derbyhaven. The mound is said to be a possible prehistoric burial site. The recovery of a bronze flat axe implies a possible Bronze Age date. Its name derives from the Norse hanga-haugr, "Gallows hill".

=== Scarlett Point Visitor Centre ===
Scarlett Point Visitor Centre is at the south-western tip of Castletown Bay, the southern extremity of which is a conical mass of sub-columnar basalt. The former radar station and abandoned lime kilns are also a feature of this area which forms part of the island's coastal footpath connecting to Fisher's Hill.

=== Fairy doors ===
A notable feature of the town is a permanent trail of over 70 bright and colourful "fairy doors" for tourists to find, provided by Balley Cashtal Beg (the little people of Castletown) The trail features doors dedicated to groups such as Bowling Green Pixies, Carnival Fairies, the Seafarers and many more.

== Tunnels and legends ==
Castle Rushen and the town have long been said to have networks of tunnels. In 1938 tunnels under the town square were found (by Ramsey Quayle, the local baker, who was replacing an oven in his basement) leading to the Castle from nearby houses. Bagnio House also had a tunnel leading from it. The legend of Ivar and Matilda tells how in 1249 the knight Ivar saved his betrothed Matilda from the attentions of King Reginald (Rǫgnvaldr Óláfsson) and killed the king, after discovering a tunnel to the Castle, where Matilda was being kept prisoner. The killing continued an ongoing struggle between different factions of the royal family. There are also legends of giants in the tunnels under the Castle, one of which is said to be actively haunting the grounds.

== Notable people ==
- Bishop Thomas Wilson (born 1663 in Cheshire – 1755 in Michael) imprisoned at Castle Rushen during his tenure as Bishop of Sodor and Man
- Captain John Quilliam (born Marown, 1771 - died Michael 1829) a Royal Navy officer; he steered HMS Victory during the Battle of Trafalgar.
- John Christian (1776 in Castletown – 1852 in Lezayre) a Justice of the Peace and First Deemster of the island.
- Hugh Gill (Castletown 1830 - 1912) an Anglican priest, the Archdeacon of Man from 1895
- John Kewish (died 1 August 1872) the last person to be hanged on the island, in Castle Rushen on 1 August 1872. He was convicted and executed for the crime of patricide.
- James Stowell Gell QC (1855 in Castletown – 1919 in Castletown) a Manx advocate who became High Bailiff of both Castletown and Douglas.
- John Quayle-Dickson, military officer and colonial officer.
- Sir Frank Gill KCMG OBE (1866 in Castletown – 1950 in Geneva, Switzerland) was a British engineer and a pioneer of international telephony.
- Robert Henry Cain VC (1909 Shanghai, China – 1974 Crowborough, Sussex) grew up in Castletown and attended King William's College; first Manxman to earn the Victoria Cross
- James Carine (1934 Castletown - 2024 Chippenham, Wiltshire) grew up in Castletown and attended King William's College before joining the Royal Navy.
