= Castletown Civic Centre =

Municipal building in Castletown, Isle of Man

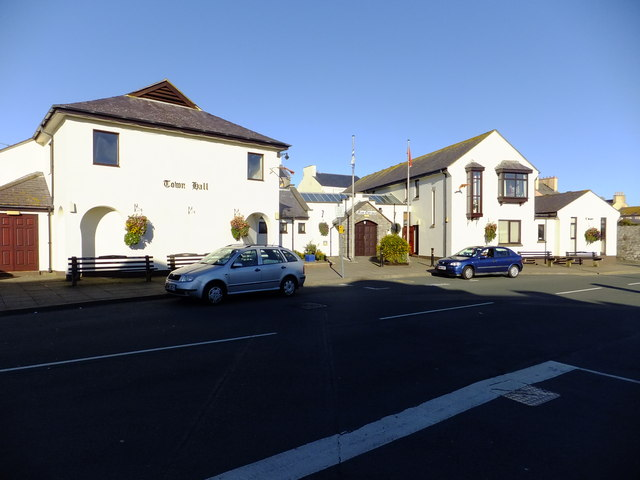
- The building in September 2013

- Shown in Isle of Man
- 54.0732°N 4.6545°W
- Location: Farrants Way, Castletown

History
- Built: 1989

Site notes
- Architectural style: Modern style

Castletown Civic Centre is a municipal complex on Farrants Way, Castletown, Isle of Man. It accommodates a public library and a police station as well as the offices and meeting place of the Castletown Town Commissioners.

== History ==
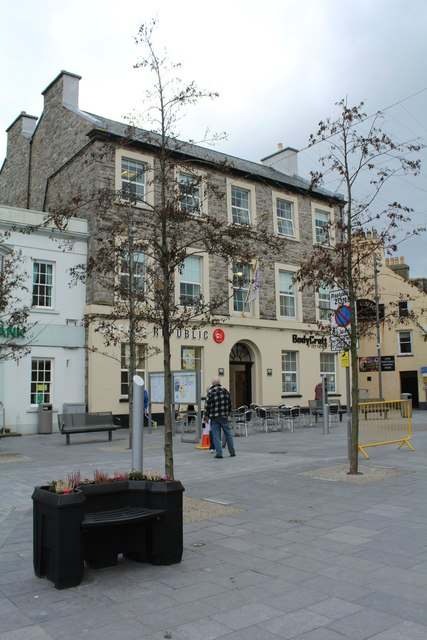
Manannan House, which served as the town hall from 1911 to 1973

The first building in Castletown referred to as a "town hall" was a building on the north side of Arbory Street. It was commissioned and financed by a group of local businessmen who formed a company for that purpose. It was not a municipal building as such but an assembly hall for public events. The foundation stone was laid by James Gell, who was High Bailiff of the town, in March 1856. It was designed in the neoclassical style, built in ashlar stone and was completed in around 1859. The design involved a hexastyle portico, formed by six Doric order columns supporting an entablature and a pediment. Internally, the main hall was 68 metres (223 ft) long and 34 metres (112 ft) wide. The poet, Thomas Edward Brown, gave his last performance there in 1897. It was later taken over by the Order of Odd Fellows and, in 2004, it became the Castletown Youth Centre.

After significant population growth, largely associated with the seaside tourism industry, town commissioners were appointed in 1883. The new town commissioners established offices in a building on the south side of the Market Square. The site had been occupied by a public house owned by John Murray, 4th Duke of Atholl and known as The George in the late 18th century. The building was acquired by the War Office in 1828 and converted into barracks in around 1830. It was bought by the town commissioners in 1911. The design involved a symmetrical main frontage of five bays facing onto the Market Square. The ground floor was faced with cement render and the central bay featured a round headed doorway. The building was fenestrated by square-headed casement windows on all three floors. After the building was no longer required for municipal purposes, it was renamed Manannan House and was subsequently occupied by a coffee shop on the ground floor with a gym above.

In 1973, National Westminster Bank presented the Old House of Keys to the town commissioners on condition that it serve the town, and it was then used as the town hall for the next 16 years.

However, in the mid-1980s, the town commissioners decided to commission a more substantial building. The site they selected was on the north side of Farrants Way. The building was designed in the modern style, built by a local contractor, Kelly & Bridson, in brick with a cement render finish and was officially opened on 16 March 1989. The complex was laid out as three blocks with a two-storey town hall on the left, a single-storey entrance block in the centre, and a two-storey library to the right. The entrance block featured a small stone porch with a gable. An extension to the library was completed in November 1999. The local police service also moved into the complex, in part of the area previously occupied by the library, in November 2017.
