= Southern Nomads R.U.F.C. =

Manx rugby union club, based in Port Erin, IOM

Southern Nomads R.U.F.C. is an amateur Rugby Football club in Port Erin, Isle of Man.

The Southern Nomads RUFC formed in 1982 who play on the Isle of Man and have played competitively in the Manx Shield and Manx Cup competitions every year since then. Regularly finishing in the top three places. They have won the coveted Manx Shield four times; most recently in the 2009/10 season. Nomads have also competed in the Cheshire Plate and will continue to persevere to improve their record there.

The Club is based in the south of the Island, primarily between the villages of Port Erin and Port St. Mary, and play home matches at King William's College.

Nomads 2nd team have formed in their own right as the Emerging Southern Nomads.

With a ‘senior’ membership of at least 50 players, and about 80 ‘youngsters’ they are working to develop facilities of their own to provide the membership with the facilities, and for the Club's future. To this end they have formed Charity no. 1001, 'SPort Erin'.

== Club honours ==
- Cheshire Plate winners (2): 2012, 2014
- Cheshire Bowl winners: 2015

== See also ==
- Isle of Man Sport
- Western Vikings Rugby Club
- Castletown Rugby Club
- Douglas Rugby Club
- Ramsey Rugby Club
- Vagabonds Rugby Club
