= Richard Ronan =

Manx politician (born 1963)

Richard Ronan MHK

Member of the House of Keys Assembly for Castletown
- In office 4 October 2011 – 2016
- Preceded by: Tony Brown
- Succeeded by: Constituency abolished

Personal details
- Born: 16 May 1963 (age 62)
- Party: Independent
- Spouse: Tracey
- Occupation: Politician

Richard Alexander Ronan (born 16 May 1963) is a former Manx politician, who was a Member of the House of Keys for Castletown from 2011 to 2016. He was minister for Environment, Food and Agriculture from 2014 until 2016.

== Political career ==
Richard first stood and was elected Member of the House of Keys for Castletown in 2011. He served one term. He retired from politics in 2016 citing the desire to spend more time with him family and develop his business.

He served as minister for Environment, Food and Agriculture from 2014 until his retirement in 2016.

=== Other parliamentary roles ===
Ronan also served in the following roles during his tenure as a member of the House of Keys:

- Member of the Department of Infrastructure 2011-
- Member of the Department of Social Care 2011-
- Member of the Department of Economic Development 2013-
- Vice Chairman of the Isle of Man Post Office 2011-
- Member of the Tynwald Honours Committee 2011-
- Chairman of the Select Committee on Public Service Broadcasting 2012

Shortly before he announced his retirement from politics, Ronan was criticised by the Manx National Farmers Union for his perceived failures and that "his department isn't listening to those trying to survive in the industry".

== Person life ==
Ronan was born 16 May 1963 to Jack Ronan and his wife Elizabeth Ronan (née Lang). He received both his primary and secondary education in Castletown at Victoria Road School and Castle Rushen High School. He then attended the College of Further Education (University College Isle of Man). He trained and worked as a joiner before founding his own business as a joiner in 1986 and then as a building contractor from 1990 to 2011.

He is married with three children and enjoys local history and is a Liverpool F.C. fan.
