= Sport in the Isle of Man =

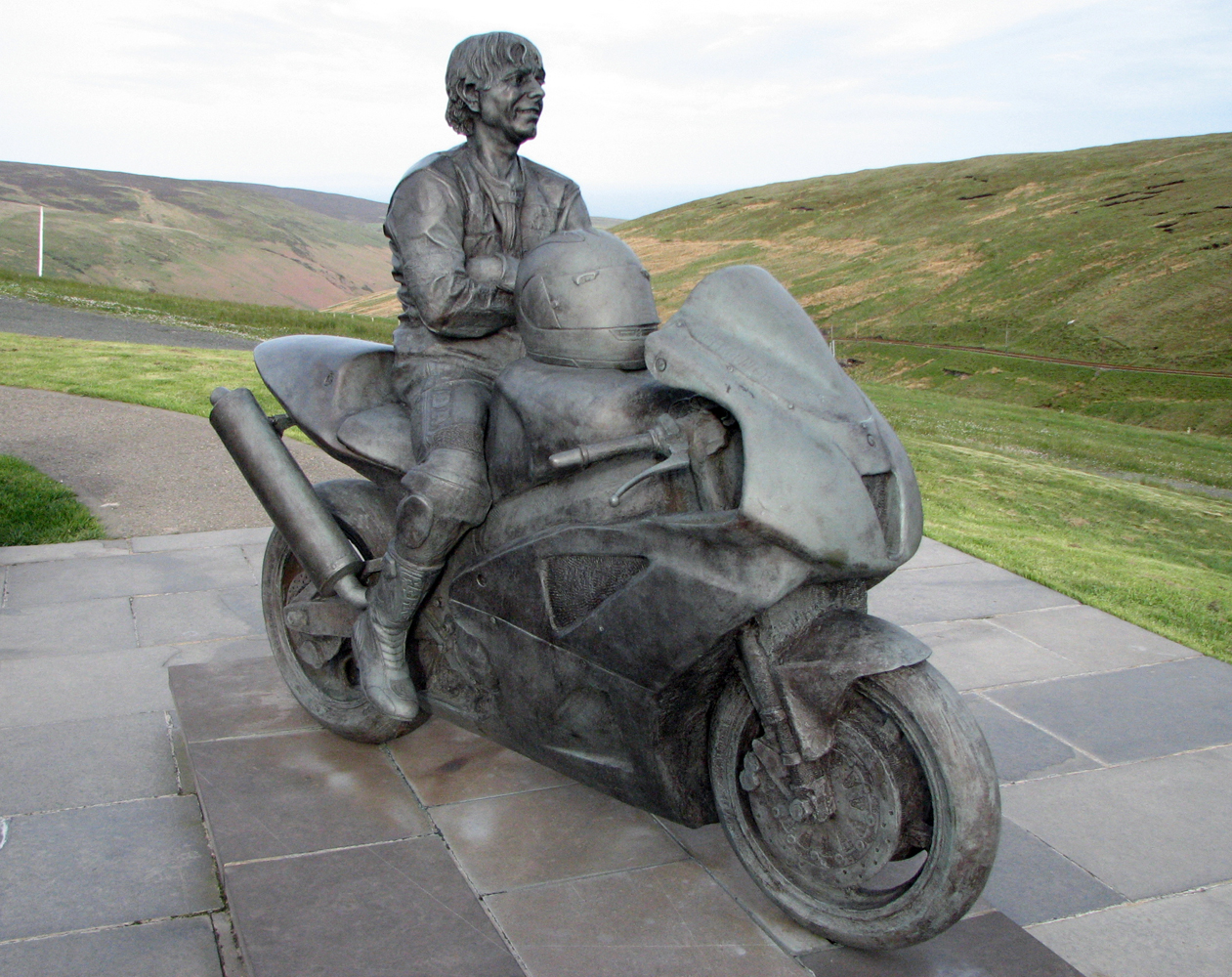
Statue of the late Joey Dunlop on Snaefell mountain

For a small country, sport in the Isle of Man plays an important part in making the island known to the wider world. The principal international sporting event held on the island is the annual Isle of Man TT motorcycling event. However, the Isle of Man is represented internationally in a number of other sports at the Commonwealth Games and the Island Games.

== International sport ==
The Isle of Man hosted the IV Commonwealth Youth Games in September 2011. The island started the Island Games in 1985 and hosted them once again in 2001. The most notable international event held on the Isle of Man is the Isle of Man TT motorcycle races, held annually in June. Rower Sidney Swann and cyclist Peter Kennaugh are the only islanders to have won Olympic Games gold medals, while polo player Frederick Agnew Gill won a bronze medal in 1900 and cyclist Mark Cavendish won a silver in 2016. In the Olympic Games, Manx athletes may compete in Team GB.

== Cricket ==
The Isle of Man Cricket Association broke their affiliation with the Lancashire Cricket Board in 2004 to become affiliate members of the International Cricket Council and compete as a national team in their own right. The Isle of Man cricket team competed in their first official ICC competitions in 2005.

== Cycling ==
The Manx Trophy cycling event is held annually. The Isle of Man is represented in international cycling by a number of professional riders.

Manxman Mark Cavendish won two World Championships in the Madison, having won the event in Manchester at the 2008 UCI Track Cycling World Championships along with race partner Bradley Wiggins, and also with Rob Hayles at the Los Angeles World Championships in 2005. In 2006, he won a gold medal in the Scratch race on the track at the Commonwealth Games in Melbourne. After failing to win a medal in the Madison at the 2008 Olympic Games, Cavendish switched exclusively to road racing. He currently rides for Team Qhubeka NextHash. His sprinting abilities have made him one of the most prolific talents in British cycling, with 35 stage wins to date in the Tour de France between 2008 and 2024, and the green jersey in the 2011 Tour de France. In 2011, Cavendish, with the support of the British team, won the World Championship Road Race.

In 1966, Manxman Peter Buckley won a gold medal in the Men's Road Racing Championship at the Commonwealth Games in Kingston, Jamaica. Just a couple of years later, his life and career were cut short when a dog ran into the road, causing Buckley to crash and subsequently die from the resultant cerebral injuries.

Other notable Manx racing cyclists include Olympic champion and Commonwealth medallist Peter Kennaugh, world and Commonwealth track cycling champion Matthew Bostock, Commonwealth track cycling medallist Mark Christian and Millie Robinson, who won the first Tour de France Féminin and broke the world hour record.

== Rugby union ==
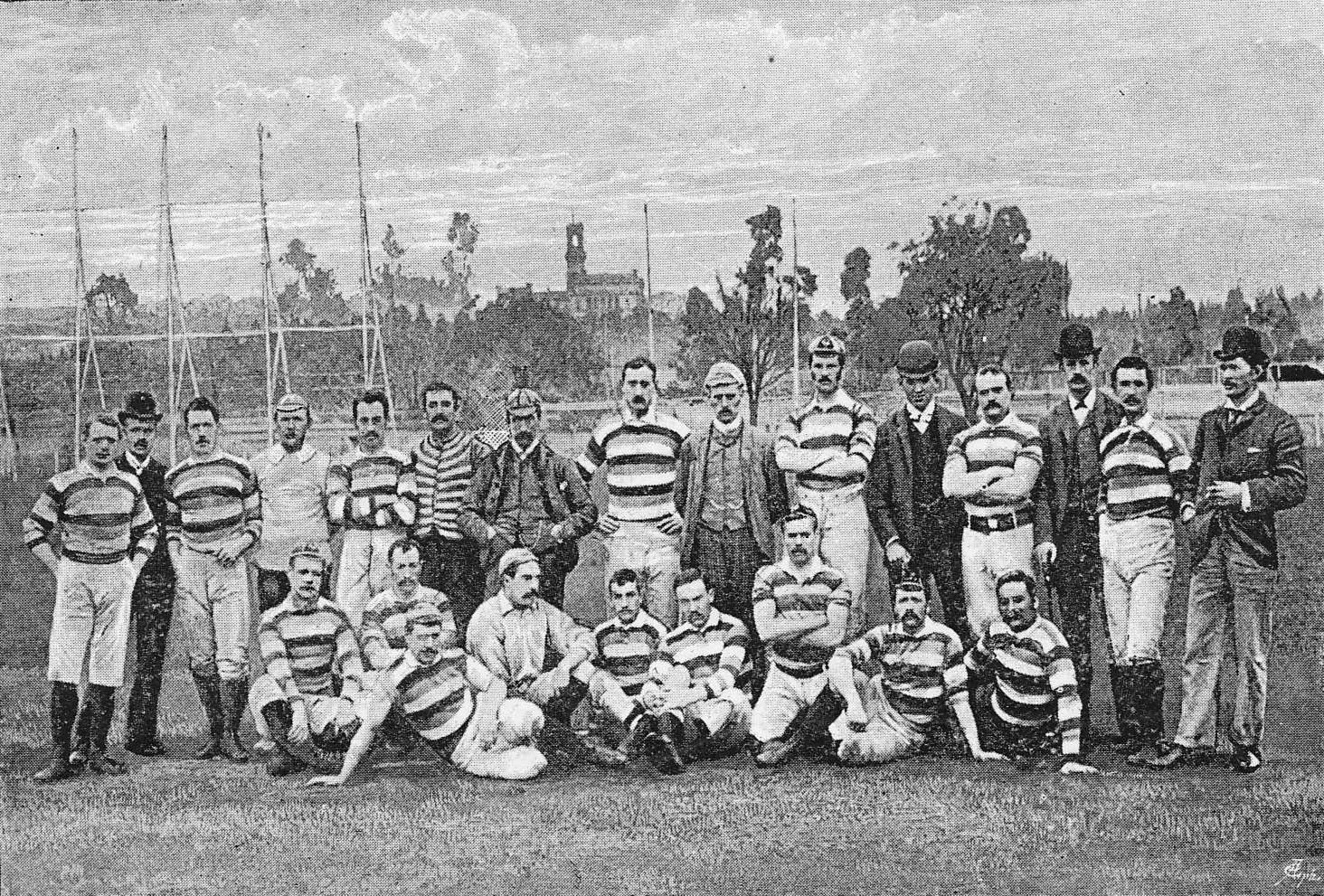
The 1888 British Isles side including A.P. Penketh of Douglas RFC

There are five rugby union clubs in the island. The main domestic competition is the Dorchester Maritime Manx Cup; the secondary domestic competition is the Shimmin Wilson Manx Shield.

The current holders of the Manx Cup are Douglas Rugby Club and the Shield is held by Ramsey Rugby Club. The other island clubs are Castletown Rugby Club, Southern Nomads Rugby Club and Vagabonds Rugby Club.

Douglas, Vagabonds and Ramsey participate in the English leagues.

== Motorcycle racing ==
The Isle of Man is famous for its TT motorbike racing event, which began in 1904 as a motorcar race. TT stands for Tourist Trophy. From 1905, the TT was held as a closed-roads motorcycle racing event and the original course was extended in the 1920s to use the current Snaefell Mountain Course. This is now a series of annual motorcycle road races over 37.73 mi (60.72 km) held from late May to early June.

The 4.25-mile (6.84 km) Billown circuit near Castletown has been the scene of further events such as the Southern 100 in May, June and July since 1955.

Further racing takes place on the TT course each August–September in the form of the Manx Grand Prix (MGP). The idea of motor cycle racing for amateurs and private entrants on the famous TT course gave rise to the birth of the MGP back in 1921.

Linked to all this motor cycle racing are the Supporters Clubs, Riders Associations, the TT Marshals Association and the MGP Marshals Association.

== Rallying ==
The Isle of Man hosts a number of rallying events including the Rally Isle of Man (formerly the Manx International Rally or Manx Trophy Rally) a round of the British Open Rally Championship. Also the Manx Rally (formerly the Manx National Rally), a round of the British National Rally Championship. Mark Higgins is a noted Manx rally driver, having won the Manx Rally a record five times, along with other events.

== Association football ==
Association football is also popular, with the Isle of Man Football Association running a league of 27 clubs in two divisions, as well as a football combination for the reserve teams of the league clubs. There is also a national football team and Ellan Vannin team, although they do not participate in UEFA or FIFA tournaments. The Isle of Man Football Association has the status of a County Football Association within the English Football Association so is therefore represented by the England national football team. People born in the Isle of Man are eligible to play for England, Scotland, Wales or Northern Ireland

In August 2019, it was announced that FC Isle of Man was investigating plans for a new club to be formed on the island which would join the English football league system. In December 2019, the club officially applied to join the North West Counties Football League, at Step 6 of the English non-league system. The league would then take the application to the Football Association with 'a recommendation that FC Isle of Man is accepted providing the appropriate criteria is met by 31 March 2020'.

== Gymnastics ==
The Isle of Man has successful men's and women's gymnastics teams and individuals competing in European, Commonwealth and World level events. The Isle of Man Gymnastics Association sends selected gymnasts from local clubs including Ellan Vannin and Manx Gym to events such as the Commonwealth Games, Island Games, Northern Europeans, and Celtic Cup, where the island competes with national representation. Island gymnasts also compete in England, Ireland, Scotland, Wales and further afield at both Championship, Challenge or Graded level. The sport has a very large growing young population, with larger Douglas clubs Manx Gym and Ellan Vannin, and smaller clubs Southern Gymnastics and Northern Gymnastics, drawing from the schools and the kindergartens.

== Hockey ==
There are many Manx hockey teams, with mixed, men's and ladies' leagues. The mixed league runs from September to December with the men's and ladies' leagues running from January to April. Each club has a nominated home pitch which is one of the National Sports Centres regional astro turf pitches. Bacchas, Vikings & Harlequins Hockey Clubs all play at the NSC in Douglas, Valkyrs Hockey Club play at the QEII High School in Peel, Castletown Hockey Club play at Castle Rushen High School and Ramsey Hockey Club play at Ramsey Grammar School.

The Manx Hockey Association (MHA) maintains live records of all league fixtures, results and scorers.

The Isle of Man is also home to the annual Whit Hockey Festival. Held over the last weekend in May, the tournament welcomes many sides from around the UK to play mixed, men's and ladies' hockey at all levels of ability. Acting on behalf of the Isle of Man Government, the entire event is covered by professional photographer, John Coxon.

== Shooting ==
Target shooting has a long and successful tradition on the Isle of Man. Ranges and clubs exist for rifle, pistol and shotgun disciplines and the various elements come together under the umbrella organisation, the Isle of Man Target Shooting Federation. Shooting has won more medals for the Isle of Man at the Commonwealth Games than any other sport. The Islands shooters include World medalists, British National Champions as well as Island Games Champions where collectively shooting is one of the most active sports.

== Athletics ==
Athletics is also well supported on the Isle of Man. One of the highlights of the race calendar is the Easter Athletics Festival, a great social and athletic weekend, now in its 46th year. Manx Harriers is the main athletics club on the Island, and it is successful in the UK when teams of athletes go to compete. (2008).

== Cammag ==
The sport of cammag originated on the Isle of Man. It is similar to the Scottish game of shinty, and Irish hurling. Once the most popular sport on the island, it ceased to be played by the start of the 20th century. It has more recently been revived with an annual match at St John's.

== Taekwondo ==
Taekwondo is a martial art sport that is growing in popularity. The Isle of Man Taekwondo Association was admitted as an associate member of the World Taekwondo in 2006 and the Isle of Man can compete as a country in WTF competitions.

== Other sports ==
Basketball is also played in the Isle of Man.

The Monarch Assurance International Chess tournament was held in Port Erin every September–October from 1992 to 2007. The PokerStars Isle of Man International Chess Tournament took place in 2014 and 2015 in Douglas. In 2016 Chess.com became the new sponsor of the event, which was renamed to Chess.com Isle of Man International.

The board game of Go visits the island biennially.

There is also a growing mud and obstacle running scene, with the Tough Mann Adventure Challenge starting in 2013.

Race Walking is popular as well and culminates in the yearly Parish Walk, a non-stop race over 85 miles.

== See also ==
- Sport in the United Kingdom
