= Castletown R.U.F.C. =

Rugby union football club in Castletown, Isle of Man

(Isle of Man) Castletown Rugby Club
- Full name: Castletown Rugby Union Football Club
- Union: Cheshire RFU
- Nickname: Town
- Location: Castletown, Isle of Man
- Ground: Poulsom Park
- Chairman: John Grimshaw
- President: Garry Logan
- Coach: Nick Dale
- Captain: Matt Quine
- League: Manx Shield
- 2012-13: 3rd

Castletown R.U.F.C. is a Rugby union football club in Castletown, Isle of Man.

== History ==
The club traces its roots back to the late 1960s, when a rugby club, Ronaldsway Rugby Club, was formed by employees of the Ronaldsway Aircraft Company.

The first official outing for the new-formed club was the Douglas Rugby Club Easter Sevens competition in 1967, held in the grounds of King Williams College. There were just seven players for their debut, but things improved over the following weeks and months, and the number of players increased.

Facilities began to improve, when the pitch was moved from the hillside where the first couple of games were played, to a better quality playing area, with use of the cricket pavilion for changing and membership of the Ronaldsway Sports and Social Club.

Along with the local sides of Douglas and Vagabonds, the only other regular fixture was against the King Williams College second team. However, matches were also played against touring sides.

The 1980s a new competition, the Manx Shield, became part of the annual rugby calendar. The club were runners up in the Shield for the first two years of its existence. During this time the club lost a number of players to the newly formed Southern Nomads club, but new clubs meant more games and a bigger competition.

As the 1990s beckoned, the management at the Aircraft Company realised that the rugby club they were supporting was no longer made up solely of employees and withdrew their support, so Ronaldsway as it was, folded. Or would have if not a few souls, at the final Ronaldsway RUFC Dinner Dance, refused to give up the club that they had been part of for so long and vowed to find a way to continue and Castletown RUFC was founded.

With the permission of Castletown Commissioners a pitch was marked out at Poulsom Park and posts erected, although short at first. Changing facilities were sparse, with the railway station awning keeping the rain off on wet days. Modern changing facilities by way of porta-cabins came next, which were added to, repainted and repaired over the next few years.

The club has completed the building of permanent changing facilities to replace the porta-cabins. They were officially opened in October 2006 and built with the support of the Rugby Football Union (RFU), Manx Lottery Trust, Manx Sports Council, Castletown Commissioners and the members of Castletown RUFC. With the newly formed Castletown Rugby Union Football Club Limited, the club has secured the tenure on the pitch at Poulsom Park, having taken on a lease from the Castletown Commissioners.

== 2012/13 Season ==
Castletown struggled for much of the year with playing numbers and absences in key positions. Generously moustachioed utility man James Jones missed most of the season travelling with work or by rickshaw, regular try scorer Barry Irvine suffered a potentially career ending knee injury early in the season and powerhouse prop Ruan Badenhorst incurred a broken leg while attempting to gain a winning try at Mooragh Park against Ramsey B.

Despite these set backs morale remained high throughout and 'Town managed to secure a number of impressive wins throughout the season to ensure they made the Manx Bowl final. The season ended with a fine success in the Manx Bowl final with a hard fought 10-8 victory over a strong Ramsey B side.

Following an annual dinner, the club are hoping to build on this success and defend their crown next season.

== See also ==
- Rugby union in the Isle of Man
- Isle of Man Sport
- Ramsey Rugby Club
