= Douglas R.U.F.C. =

Manx rugby union club, based in Douglas, IOM

(Isle of Man) Douglas Rugby Club
- Full name: Douglas Rugby Union Football Club
- Union: Cheshire RFU
- Nickname: Proud Lions
- Founded: 1873; 153 years ago
- Location: Douglas, Isle of Man
- Ground: Port-e-Chee
- Chairman: Peter Horsthuis
- President: Gareth Hooson-Owen
- League: Regional 2 North West
- 2025–26: 5th
1st kit	2nd kit

Official website
- www.douglasrufc.com

Douglas Rugby Club (also referred to as DRUFC) is a rugby union club based in Douglas on the Isle of Man. The club has two senior sides and age-range teams encompassing both mini and junior rugby. The men's 1st XV currently play in Regional 2 North West, at the sixth tier of the English rugby union system, following their promotion from South Lancs/Cheshire 1 via a play-off at the end of the 2016–17 season.

== History ==
Arthur William Moore, a Cambridge rugby blue in 1874, established Douglas Rugby Club in 1873. His friend Peter Drinkwater offered the use of land at Port-e-Chee, and Douglas have since been the leading club in the Isle of Man. A. P. Penketh and A. Paul were two Douglas players selected to tour Australia and New Zealand with the 1888 British Isles tour (Lions). Cheshire Cup quarter-finalists on three occasions, Douglas joined the RFU National league in 1986–87 and have since been promoted to Regional Two North West. The first Isle of Man club to build a clubhouse, subsequently extended with four changing rooms, showers, physio's room, gym, referees' facilities and kitchen, the 1st XV retained the Manx Cup for the fifth successive time in 2016–17 and were first to instigate Isle of Man mini rugby in 1994. Douglas entered the history books in 2018–19 when their first team were no longer allowed to compete in the Manx Cup. Two Manx Cup record scores had been set in a 118–3 semi-final score, and 110–0 win in the final, and it was decided Douglas 1st XV would be replaced in the local Cup competition by the 2nd team known as Douglas Celts. Under coach Tom Waterworth, the Celts won the 2019 Manx Cup in a tense final versus Ramsey 15–12 at Ballafletcher in monsoon conditions, and in doing so became the first second-string team to win the competition. In 2021–22 Douglas retained their North One West status despite Covid and travel difficulties dictating an opening run of seven away fixtures before Christmas. Ex-London Scottish prop Phil Cringle is appointed coach as Douglas prepared to celebrate 150 years in 2023.

== Honours ==
- South Lancs/Cheshire 3 champions: 2007–08
- North Lancashire/Cumbria v South Lancs/Cheshire 1 promotion play-off winner: 2016–17

== Club colours ==
The club play in maroon shorts and maroon with gold hooped socks. The shirt emblem is a Viking.

== See also ==
- Rugby union in the Isle of Man
- Sport in the Isle of Man
