= Matthew Shepherd (rugby) =

English rugby league and union player

- Born: Matthew Shepherd; 21 January 1990 (age 36) Truro, Cornwall
- Height: 5 ft 9 in (1.75 m)
- Weight: 12 st 13 lb (82 kg)

Rugby union career
- Position(s): Scrum-half, Full back
- Current team: Plymouth Albion
Senior career
Years	Team	Apps	(Points)
2009–14	St Austell	114	(1,095)
2011, 2019	Redruth	3	(3)
2011	Cornish Pirates	1	(0)
2014–15	Launceston	30	(70)
2015–19	Plymouth Albion	114	(630)
- Correct as of 27 April 2019
International career
Years	Team	Apps	(Points)
2015–	England Counties XV	7	(43)
- Correct as of 27 April 2019
- Rugby league career

Playing information
- Position: Fullback
Club
Years	Team	Pld	T	G	FG	P
2013–14	Cornish Rebels	9				82

Matthew Shepherd (born 1990) is an English and Cornish rugby union player who currently plays at scrum-half or full back for Redruth in National League 2 South, having previously played for Plymouth Albion in National League 1. An extremely reliable points scorer with a knack for scoring important tries, he was instrumental in Cornwall's County Championship victories in 2015 and 2016 and has also been capped by England Counties XV. As well as playing union, Shepherd has played summer rugby league for the Cornish Rebels.

== Career ==
=== First spell with St Austell ===
After spending the beginning of his rugby career with St Austell from the age of 6 through to U16 he joined Perranporth. After one season at Perranporth playing for their Colts side he returned to St Austell to start his adult career. He came into prominence for St Austell during the 2009–10 season, when playing at scrum-half he showed good try scoring instinct as he helped his team to a third-place finish in Tribute Cornwall/Devon. The next season his team went one better after clinching the second promotion spot by finishing as runners up behind runaway league champions, Bideford. Shepherd played an important part in his club's promotion, taking over kicking duties from Andy Ashwin, and finishing with 228 league points – a figure that also included 10 tries. The form of the young Shepherd saw him come to the attention of fellow Cornish club, Redruth, who had just been relegated from National League 1.

=== Redruth and Pirates ===
Shepherd signed for Redruth for the start of the 2011–12 National League 2 South season but returned to St Austell after just a month away and a handful of games played, citing difficulties due to work commitments and the increased travel required for away games in the division. While at Redruth he was dual-registered with the Cornish Pirates for their 2011–12 British and Irish Cup squad. He made a solitary appearance for the Cornish Pirates on 2 October 2011, making a late second half appearance from the substitute bench as his team won 38–0 away against Plymouth Albion in a pool game.

=== Return to St Austell ===
Back with St Austell, now in Tribute Western Counties West, Shepherd played in all of the club's remaining league appearances of the season, scoring 159 points as the newly promoted side finished in a very respectable 4th place. St Austell had actually led the league at one point, but lost their way slightly at the end of the season, meaning that they missed out on second place (and a promotion playoff) by just four points. St Austell also reached the final of the 2012 Cornwall Cup held at the Memorial Ground, Penryn, facing Wadebridge Camels who were one division higher. Shepherd featured in the match but despite contributing 7 points from the boot was unable to stop Wadebridge Camels winning the cup in close game, 20–17. The 2011–12 season would end on a high for Shepherd, however, as he was called up by Cornwall for their annual Tamar Cup game against Devon. He made his county début on 24 April 2012, coming on as a second-half substitute, in Cornwall's 36–15 victory at the game held at Polson Bridge, Launceston.

The 2012–13 season would be both Shepherd's and St Austell's most successful to date. He played all 26 league games in Tribute Western Counties as his club stored to the league title ahead of Bideford, contributing an outstanding 288 points to the title campaign, including 22 tries. Despite an early exit from the Cornwall Cup, St Austell embarked on a great run in the RFU Intermediate National Cup. After a walkover win in the first round they defeated Berry Hill, and then Wimborne to win the RFU South West Intermediate Cup and book a place in the National Cup semi-finals – one game from the final to be held at Twickenham. Unfortunately it would not be season hat trick for Shepherd and St Austell as they lost the semi-final game 19–31, away to south-east winners, Brighton Blues. In April Shepherd was once more called up by Cornwall to take part in the Tamar Cup game against Devon, starting the game and kicking 7 points in a 17–0 victory away at the Brickfields in Plymouth. He would also be included in Cornwall's county championship squad, making appearances from the substitutes bench as his county reached the final of the 2013 Bill Beaumont Cup, losing 26–36 to Lancashire at Twickenham, with Shepherd coming on during the second half.

The 2013–14 season would be Shepherd's last at St Austell. Despite being newly promoted to Tribute South West 1 West his club held its own and finished in 4th spot behind fellow Cornish side, Camborne, with Shepherd enjoying another prolific year with 263 points (including 19 tries) from the 25 games he played in. St Austell also reached the final of the Cornwall Cup for the second year running, again ending up empty handed as they lost 10–24 to league rivals Camborne at the Recreation Ground in Redruth with Shepherd kicking 5 points for the losing side. Over the summer of 2014 Shepherd was called up to the Cornwall squad for the 2014 Bill Beaumont Cup having featured in the 17–0 Tamar Cup warm-up victory against Devon at Polson Bridge, Launceston. At the county championships proper Cornwall once again finished as runners up to nemesis Lancashire, losing 26–36 in the Twickenham final, with Shepherd making an appearance from the substitutes bench early in the second half.

=== Launceston ===
For the 2014–15 season Shepherd left St Austell to sign for Launceston to have another stab at National League 2 South following his early spell with Redruth (who had also chased his signature over the summer). Coach Neil Bayliss had been looking at Shepherd for some time following his displays for St Austell and Cornwall, and felt that he would help provide strength in depth as well as being a backup kicker to club stalwart, Kieron Lewitt. He made his début away Bishop's Stortford on 6 September 2014, scoring a try in an 18–19 defeat. His versatility across the back line meant that he featured in all of Launceston's league matches that season, contributing 70 points including 8 tries, as his club finished 10th in the league, level on points with rivals Redruth who finished in 9th place due to having one more win.

Shepherd really clicked in gear with Launceston during the second half of the season and he continued his form with Cornwall, first by scoring 14 points including a try in a dominant 38–13 victory against Devon in the Tamar Cup match at Brickfields, Plymouth. He then went to play a starring role at the 2015 Bill Beaumont Cup as Cornwall went on to win their first championship in 16 years, scoring 2 tries and a conversion in the 18–13 final victory over Lancashire at Twickenham. In winning the cup, Shepherd would also finish as the competition's top scorer with a tally of 64 points, including 4 tries. His spectacular displays with Cornwall saw Shepherd called up by the England Counties XV side for their tour of Romania during the summer and he marked his international début with a try and 13 points overall in a 28–0 win over Romania A.

=== Plymouth Albion ===
During the summer of 2015 Shepherd signed for Plymouth Albion, playing a division higher in National League 1, and coached by Shepherd's Cornwall coach Graham Dawe. He was just one of the many players over the close season that were signed by Plymouth Albion from nearby Launceston – a consequence of Albion's recent relegation from the RFU Championship, and the coaches familiarity with Launceston's many county championship squad players. Shepherd made his Plymouth Albion league début on 5 September 2015, appearing from the bench in a 33–20 home win over Richmond. He would go on to appear in all 30 of Albions league matches that season (7 from the substitutes bench), contributing 189 points including 14 tries, making him the 5th highest scorer in the league overall. Albion were one of the top sides in National League 1 and were actually challenging for the league title until the latter stages of the season when the club went into administration and were docked 30 points, meaning that they ended up in 8th place despite having the second most wins in the league behind champions, Richmond.

At the season's end Shepherd was called up by Cornwall for the 2016 Bill Beaumont Cup, appearing in the warm-up Tamar Cup victory over Devon, 45–10 at Tregorrick Park, St Austell. At the county championships Shepherd once again played a key role as Cornwall went on to retain the cup with a 35–13 win over Cheshire in the Twickenham final. He finished as the competition's second top scorer with 48 points – 20 of which came in the final. During the summer of 2016 Shepherd was once more invited by England Counties XV to take part in their tour of Canada. On a successful tour in which Counties won all their matches, Shepherd played his part by kicking 16 points in the two games he appeared in.

The 2016–17 season saw Shepherd feature in all 30 of Albion's league games, contributing 164 points, including 10 tries, as his team finished second in National League 1 – some distance behind record breaking champions Hartpury College. He would be called up by Cornwall for the 2017 Bill Beaumont Cup, helping his county to reach the final once again but ultimately being unable to claim a third title in a row as they were well beaten 8–19 by Lancashire at Twickenham. After the county championships, Shepherd was called up by England Counties XV to take part in their tour of Spain. He made his first appearance on the tour from the substitutes bench, kicking 4 points as Counties beat Euskarians 61–19 in San Sebastián. He then started the second game of the tour, contributing ten points from the boot as Counties beat Spain 45–28 in Guadalajara.

After finishing in mid-table with Albion at the end of the 2018–19 season, Shepherd returned to county action with Cornwall, helping them to retain the Tamar Cup at the Brickfields against Devon, contributing three conversions in a 28–13 victory. Although he missed the first game of the 2019 Bill Beaumont Cup, Shepherd played in the two remaining group games and was selected to start the Twickenham final against Cheshire. In a tense game, he helped orchestrate Cornwall from scrum-half after the original scrum-half was red-carded, and it was Shepherd who held his nerve to kick the match-winning conversion (well into injury time), to win the game 14–12. It was Shepherd's third county championship title, and Cornwall's sixth overall.

=== Redruth ===
In the summer of 2019, Shepherd rejoined Redruth after having spent four seasons at Plymouth Albion, dropping down a division to play in National League 2 South. He would take up a position as a player-coach at the Reds, who he had previously had a short spell with back in 2011.

=== Rugby League ===
While rugby union is his main game, Shepherd has also played rugby league for the Cornish Rebels during the summer months on a number of occasions. He made his first appearance for the Rebels on 11 August 2013, scoring 2 tries and a conversion as his side won 60–10 against the Plymouth Titans at the Recreation Ground in Redruth to book a place in the South West Rugby League Grand Final. A couple of weeks later Shepherd was part of the Rebels side that took part in the Grand Final held at Polson Bridge in Launceston against the Devon Sharks. Although strong favourites having dominated the league stage and having beaten the Sharks three times already, the Rebels had their poorest performance of the season and ended up the wrong side of a 24–38 scoreline, Shepherd getting 2 tries for the losing side. Shepherd also represented Cornwall in their County of Origin win over Devon in August 2013, scoring two tries and kicking 6 conversions to help his side to a 36–26 victory at the Recreation Ground in Redruth.

In 2014 despite having just won the rugby union county championships with Cornwall, Shepherd decided to once more play summer rugby league with the Cornish Rebels, making his first appearance and scoring 2 tries in a 58–24 win over the Plymouth Titans in the semi-finals of the South-West Challenge Cup. A week later he made his first league appearance of the campaign, helping himself to 4 tries as the Rebels won 50–20 away to the Exeter Centurions. At the end of June the Rebels won their first silverware of the season when they defeated Exeter Centurions 38–26 at Polson Bridge in Launceston to retain the South-West Challenge Cup, with Shepherd grabbing a try. In August the Rebels then claimed the league title to make it a double, winning the South Grand Final at Tregorrick Park, St Austell, after a 68–16 win over the Plymouth Titans, Shepherd getting yet another try to make it an impressive personal total of 14 for the summer.

== Rugby union season-by-season playing stats ==
=== Club ===
Season	Club	Competition	Appearances	Tries	Drop Goals	Conversions	Penalties	Total Points
2009–10	St Austell	Tribute Cornwall/Devon	12	8	0	0	0	40 (Note: St Austell are missing a number of match reports for the 2009–10 season so it is likely that Shepherd played more games and scored more tries and points.)
2009–10	St Austell	Cornwall Cup	0	0	0	0	0	0
2010–11	St Austell	Tribute Cornwall/Devon	20	10	0	65	16	228
2010–11	St Austell	Cornwall Cup	1	0	0	0	0	0
2011–12	Redruth	National League 2 South	3	0	0	0	1	3
2011–12	Cornish Pirates	British and Irish Cup	1	0	0	0	0	0
2011–12	St Austell	Tribute Western Counties West	20	6	0	39	17	159
2011–12	St Austell	Cornwall Cup	3	1	0	8	3	30
2012–13	St Austell	Tribute Western Counties West	26	22	0	62	18	288
2012–13	St Austell	Cornwall Cup	1	0	0	1	1	5
2012–13	St Austell	RFU Intermediate National Cup	3	0	0	7	7	35
2013–14	St Austell	Tribute South West 1 West	25	19	0	51	22	263
2013–14	St Austell	Cornwall Cup	3	7	0	6	0	47
2014–15	Launceston	National League 2 South	30	8	0	6	6	70
2015–16	Plymouth Albion	National League 1	30	14	0	34	17	189
2016–17	Plymouth Albion	National League 1	30	10	0	39	12	164
2017–18	Plymouth Albion	National League 1	29	12	0	28	3	125
2018–19	Plymouth Albion	National League 1	25	5	0	47	11	152
2019–20	Redruth	National League 2 South	0	0	0	0	0	0

=== County/Representative ===
Season	Side	Competition	Appearances	Tries	Drop Goals	Conversions	Penalties	Total Points
2011–12	Cornwall	Tamar Cup	1	0	0	0	0	0
2012–13	Cornwall	Tamar Cup	1	0	0	2	1	7
2012–13	Cornwall	County Championship	3 (Note: Shepherd may have played 4 games for Cornwall in the 2013 County Championships. However, it is not clear if he came off the bench to feature in his county's 24–19 win over Gloucestershire in their first pool match.)	0	0	0	0	0
2013–14	Cornwall	Tamar Cup	1	0	0	0	1	3
2013–14	Cornwall	County Championship	2	0	0	0	0	0
2014–15	Cornwall	Tamar Cup	1	1	0	3	1	14
2014–15	Cornwall	County Championship	4	4	0	4	12	64
2014–15	England Counties XV	Tour of Romania	1 (Note: There were 2 games played on the England Counties XV tour of Romania in 2015 – however only the second game counted towards an England Counties cap.)	1	0	4	0	13
2015–16	Cornwall	Tamar Cup	1	0	0	0	0	0
2015–16	Cornwall	County Championship	4	1	0	8	9	48
2015–16	England Counties XV	Tour of Canada	2	0	0	8	0	16
2016–17	Cornwall	Tamar Cup	0	0	0	0	0	0
2016–17	Cornwall	County Championship	3	1	0	6	1	20
2016–17	England Counties XV	Tour of Spain	2	0	0	7	0	14
2017–18	Cornwall	Tamar Cup	1	0	0	0	0	0
2017–18	Cornwall	County Championship	0	0	0	0	0	0
2018–19	Cornwall	Tamar Cup	1	0	0	3	0	6
2018–19	Cornwall	County Championship	3	0	0	1	0	2

== Rugby league season-by-season playing stats ==
=== Club ===
Season	Club	Competition	Appearances	Tries	Drop Goals	Conversions	Penalties	Total Points
2013	Cornish Rebels	South West Rugby League (Note: Includes 2013 South West Rugby League Grand Final. Also, note that Shepherd may have actually played for Rebels in their 52–12 win over Plymouth Titans on 27 July 2013 but no records are available.)	2	4	0	1	0	18
2014	Cornish Rebels	South West Rugby League (Note: Includes 2014 South West Rugby League Grand Final.)	4	14	0	0	0	56
2014	Cornish Rebels	South West Challenge Cup	3	2	0	0	0	8

=== County/Representative ===
Season	Club	Competition	Appearances	Tries	Drop Goals	Conversions	Penalties	Total Points
2013	Cornwall	County of Origin	1	2	0	6	0	20

== Honours and records ==
=== Rugby Union ===
St Austell

- RFU South West Intermediate Cup winners: 2013
- Tribute Western Counties West champions: 2012–13

Cornwall

- Tamar Cup winners (7): 2012, 2013, 2014, 2015, 2016, 2018, 2019
- County Championship winners (3): 2015, 2016, 2019

England Counties XV

- Selected for tour of Romania: 2015
- Selected for tour of Canada: 2016
- Selected for tour of Spain: 2017

Individual

- County Championship top points scorer: 2015 (64 points)

=== Rugby League ===
Cornish Rebels

- South West Rugby League Challenge Cup winners: 2014
- South West Rugby League Grand Final winners: 2014

Cornwall

- County of Origin winners: 2013
