= Alex Ducker =

English rugby union and league player

- Born: 15 March 1993 (age 33) Torquay, Devon
- Height: 5 ft 10 in (1.78 m)
- Weight: 196 lb (89 kg)

Rugby union career
- Position(s): Wing, Full back
- Current team: Camborne
Senior career
| Years | Team | Apps | (Points) |
| 2010–16, 18–19 | Camborne | 84 | (536) |
| 2011–13, 15 | Penryn | 30 | (219) |
| 2014 | Cornish Pirates | 4 | (20) |
| 2014 | Launceston | 1 | (20) |
| 2015, 16–17, 18 | Redruth | 29 | (170) |
| 2017–18 | Hartpury College | 6 | (0) |
| 2019– | Plymouth Albion | 52 | (220) |
- Correct as of 25 June 2019
- Rugby league career

Playing information
- Position: Wing
Club
| Years | Team | Pld | T | G | FG | P |
|---|---|---|---|---|---|---|
| 2013, 15 | Cornish Rebels | 9 | | | | 88 |

Alex Ducker (born 15 March 1993) is an English professional rugby union and rugby league player who plays as a winger or full back. He is currently playing back at Camborne. He previously played for Plymouth Albion from 2019 until 2022. An extremely gifted try scorer who can also kick points, he is most comfortable on the wing but can also play at full back. During his career he has led a nomadic existence which has seen him play for all of the top club sides in Cornwall including a stint with the Cornish Pirates. Ducker has been capped by the Cornwall senior rugby union side and has played summer rugby league with the Cornish Rebels, as well as experiencing Premiership Rugby Sevens with the Exeter Chiefs.

== Rugby union career ==
=== Early career ===
Ducker began his rugby career at Camborne at the age of 8. He played youth rugby for the club until 14 when he joined rivals Redruth to play for their colts. After a season with Redruth he returned to Camborne, where he would start his senior career. In October 2013 an injury crisis saw him called up in to the first team for a league game away to Chippenham, making his senior début for Town aged 17 in a close defeat by the team that would finish as Tribute South West 1 West champions. He would start the next game, a 27–10 over Cullompton, but would find appearances hard to come by for the rest of the season in a Camborne side that fought their way to a fifth-place finish. The 2011–12 season saw Ducker remain on the fringes of the Camborne first team as they improved their league ranking with a 4th-place finish. Although appearances were still limited, Ducker gave a glimpse of his potential by scoring a try in Camborne's 11–20 defeat by Redruth in the Rodda's Cup match on 26 December.

In the summer of 2012, with opportunities at Camborne limited, the young Ducker decided to try his luck with Penryn, playing a division down in Tribute Western Counties West. With less competition for places, Ducker was able to become a first team regular at his new club, scoring multiple tries including braces against Truro, Devonport Services and Bideford as well as a hat-trick in the last game of the season, a 29–44 defeat by Ivybridge. As well as showing exceptional try scoring ability, Ducker also proved a reliable backup kicker in a Penryn side that finished a respectable 5th in the league.

The 2013–14 season saw Ducker continue to terrorise defences in Tribute Western Counties West, scoring back to back hat-tricks in the first two league games, as Penryn beat first St Ives, and then Tavistock. His try scoring form would continue that autumn, including another hat-trick in a victory over Bude, and this led to him coming to the attention of former club, Camborne, who had resigned him by November. He scored a try on his first game back with Town, a 23–17 victory over Chard RFC in the league, and despite moving back up a division, continued to play with confidence, contributing 24 tries in just 17 games as his side went on to finish 3rd in Tribute South West 1 West, just missing out on the promotion playoff spot to Chard. He would also grab a try in the impressive 35–26 victory over Redruth in the Rodda's Milk Cup over the festive period. The final highlight of the season would see Camborne win the Cornwall Cup but unfortunately for Ducker he was unable to take part in the victory, having already appeared in the competition with Penryn. Ducker's outstanding form with Camborne saw him called up by Cornwall, making his début in a 17–0 victory over Devon at Polson Bridge in Launceston, as Cornwall retained the Tamar Cup.

=== Pirates and Back Again ===
Ducker's prolific try scoring in the south-west regional leagues saw him come to the attention of RFU Championship side Cornish Pirates, and he signed for the club during the summer of 2014. Although he enjoyed a good pre-season, scoring 4 tries in 5 appearances, including 2 against the University of Bath he was unable to break into the Pirates first team and by October he was loaded to Launceston, who played two divisions down in National League 2 South. This loan move did not work out either, and by December Ducker returned to Camborne, scoring a try in his first game back as they beat Bideford 28–16 at home. He would go to feature in all of Town's remaining fixtures of the season, scoring 14 tries including hat-tricks against Cullompton and Avonmouth Old Boys. Although Camborne could only manage a 6th-place finish in the league they did retain the Cornwall Cup (for the third time in a row), Ducker getting the second try as his team went on to defeat St Austell 23–13 in a tough match at St Clements Hill in Truro which required extra time.

=== Redruth injury to Camborne league & cup double ===
In the summer of 2015 Ducker left Camborne to sign for arch-rivals Redruth with whom he had formerly played colts rugby. The move would give him another opportunity at higher level rugby as the league Redruth were playing in (National League 2 South) was two divisions higher than the one Camborne were playing in (Tribute South West 1 West. Ducker started well for the Reds, playing in the first three league games of the season and scoring 2 tries but this good start was not destined to last as he suffered a knee injury early on in the campaign. Unable to get back into the Redruth team, in November he decided to return to another former club, Penryn, who were riding high in Tribute Western Counties West. Ducker's first game back with the Borough saw him score a try in the 20–15 league win over Devonport Services. He played in the club's games through November and December, scoring multiple tries including a hat-trick against Saltash.

At the end of 2015 Ducker left Penryn to resign with Camborne for the fourth time! Camborne were a much stronger team than with previous seasons and with Ducker back at the club they stormed to the Tribute West 1 West league title. Ducker contributed 17 tries in the title run in from just 11 games – a total that included 3 hat-tricks. More glory was to follow as Camborne went on to win the Cornwall Cup for the 10th time (and fourth in a row), which tied them with Redruth. Ducker played a starring role in the final at Tregorrick Park in St Austell, claiming a hat-trick against his former club Penryn as Camborne went on to win 62–8 – the biggest cup final winning margin in the competition's history.

=== Second Chance with the Reds ===
Despite his double success with Camborne Ducker decided to forego Town's adventure into National League 3 South West (the highest level the club had reached in decades), instead opting for a second shot at Redruth. In the summer of 2016 he signed with Redruth to undertake his second spell with the Reds (or third if you count youth rugby). He instantly got off to a good start, scoring 2 tries in a 48–12 win in National League 2 South over newcomers Barnstaple. While previous attempts at this level had ended with disappointment, this time Ducker was ready and by Christmas he was the league's top try scorer and earning rave reviews for his performances. In December he faced former club Camborne in the Rodda's Cup/Cornwall Super Cup double header, scoring a try as Redruth won 54–7. On 7 January 2017 he scored possibly the try of the season at home against promotion favourites, Chinnor, chipping an opposition player in his own 22 before going on to beat four more defenders as he raced the length of the pitch to go down under the posts, helping Redruth to a 21–7 win. Unfortunately, Ducker was injured in February, with 24 tries already to his name, and did not make any appearances for the rest of the campaign, also causing him to miss the 2017 Bill Beaumont Cup with Cornwall (he would surely have been a cert for the squad). Before he was injured Redruth were doing well in the league, and had looked to be potential title challengers, but their form dropped off towards the end of the season and they finished in 5th place.

=== Hartpury College ===
In June 2017 Ducker left Redruth to sign for Hartpury College, playing two divisions higher in the RFU Championship. After failing to get much game time at Hartpury he returned to former club Redruth on loan in March 2018, proving to be an instant hit with 7 tries in 4 games, including 4 in one game against Broadstreet. In May 2018 Ducker was released by Hartpury College.

=== Back to Camborne ===
In the summer of 2018 Ducker signed for Camborne following his loan spell with Redruth, making it his fifth spell with the club and his first since 2016, dropping one league down from National League 2 South to South West Premier. He continued his try scoring prowess, with a personal best of 39 tries in just 26 league games during the 2018-19 season, particularly impressive considering Camborne only finished mid-table and struggled with injuries throughout the campaign. That season he also returned to the Cornwall county side, scoring a hat-trick of tries as they retained the Tamar Cup with a 28-13 win over Devon. He continued his outstanding form in the 2019 County Championships, scoring 4 tries to finish as joint top try scorer in the tournament, including a solo try in the final as Cornwall won their sixth title.

== Rugby league career ==
During the summer of 2013 Ducker decided to use the pre-season to try his hand at rugby league with the newly formed Cornish Rebels who were competing in the South West Rugby League. Despite being new to the league the Rebels started the season extremely well with huge wins against Somerset Vikings (100–30) and Exeter Centurions (108–20), Ducker getting hat-tricks in each. In July, he was in the side that contested the South West Challenge Cup final held at Polson Bridge, Launceston, scoring 2 tries in a 43–26 win over the Devon Sharks as the Rebels won the cup for the first time in the club's history.

A third hat-trick for Ducker was achieved at the start of August as the Rebels beat Plymouth Titans 60–10 at the Recreation Ground in Redruth to win the league stage and book a place in the Grand Final. In the Grand Final the Rebels faced the Devon Sharks for the third time that season, having won the other two encounters. Ducker scored two tries in the final at Polson Bridge but it was not enough as the Rebels went down 24–38 to the Sharks. Ducker was picked for Cornwall at the end of August as they defeated Devon 36–26 to win the first ever County of Origin game between the sides, Ducker getting a try in the second half in the game held at Redruth.

After missing the 2014 rugby league season, Ducker returned to the Cornish Rebels in the summer of 2015. He played his first game of the season in a 54–18 league win away to the Devon Sharks, scoring a try from his own half. At the end of May he featured in Cornwall's County of Origin game against Devon, kicking 2 conversions but missing a crucial kick at the death in a 24–26 defeat at the Recreation Ground in Redruth. In June, he was on the bench for the South West League Challenge Cup final, held at Saltash. Coming on for the second half, Ducker scored a hat-trick but it was not enough as the Rebels lost 24–49 against the Exeter Centurions – the first time in the sides 3-year history that it had lost a game in the cup.

A month later, the Rebels were in the Grand Final, with home advantage at the game at Polson Bridge, Launceston, thanks to winning the league stage. Once again they faced the Exeter Centurions in a final, but this time the Rebels thrashed the Exeter Centurions 94–12 to win the South West Rugby League Grand Final for the second year running, with Ducker scoring 4 tries.

== Rugby union season-by-season playing stats ==
=== Club ===
| Season | Club | Competition | Appearances | Tries | Drop Goals | Conversions | Penalties | Total Points |
|---|---|---|---|---|---|---|---|---|
| 2010–11 | Camborne | Tribute South West 1 West | 2 | 0 | 0 | 0 | 0 | 0 |
| 2010–11 | Camborne | Cornwall Cup | 0 | 0 | 0 | 0 | 0 | 0 |
| 2010–11 | Camborne | Rodda's Milk Cup | 0 (Note: Ducker may have made 1 appearance in the 2010–11 Rodda's Milk Cup as he was on the bench for the second game but it is not clear if he came on.) | 0 | 0 | 0 | 0 | 0 |
| 2011–12 | Camborne | Tribute South West 1 West | 4 (Note: Ducker was a bit part player during the 2012–13 but may have played 2 more league games as press reports are not clear for several games in September.) | 1 | 0 | 0 | 0 | 5 |
| 2011–12 | Camborne | Cornwall Cup | 1 | 0 | 0 | 0 | 0 | 0 |
| 2011–12 | Camborne | Rodda's Milk Cup | 1 (Note: Ducker may have made 2 appearances in the 2011–12 Rodda's Milk Cup as he was on the bench for the second game but it is not clear if he came on.) | 1 | 0 | 0 | 0 | 5 |
| 2012–13 | Penryn | Tribute Western Counties West | 17 (Note: Ducker was with Penryn throughout the whole of the 2012–13 season and is likely to have played more than 17 games and scored more tries and points. However, due to inconsistent press reports there is no way of finding out this missing information.) | 19 | 0 | 13 | 1 | 124 |
| 2012–13 | Penryn | Cornwall Cup | 1 (Note: Ducker may have played 2 Cornwall Cup games in the 2012–13 season. However, there is no mention in the press of Penryn's game against Liskeard-Looe in the Cornwall Cup 1st round, although the defeat by Bude in the quarter-finals has been included.) | 0 | 0 | 0 | 0 | 0 |
| 2013–14 | Penryn | Tribute Western Counties West | 7 (Note: At the start of the 2013–14 season Ducker played at least 7 league games for Penryn, scoring 11 tries, before switching to Camborne in November. He is likely to have played 2 more games against Torquay Athletic on 28 September and Ivybridge on 2 November but this is not clear from online sources.) | 11 | 0 | 0 | 0 | 55 |
| 2013–14 | Penryn | Cornwall Cup | 1 | 2 | 0 | 0 | 0 | 10 |
| 2013–14 | Camborne | Tribute South West 1 West | 17 | 24 | 0 | 3 | 2 | 132 |
| 2013–14 | Camborne | Cornwall Cup | 0 (Note: Ducker was unable to play in the Cornwall Cup with Camborne having been cup-tied as he had played for Penryn in the earlier rounds of the competition.) | 0 | 0 | 0 | 0 | 0 |
| 2013–14 | Camborne | Rodda's Milk Cup | 1 (Note: Ducker played in at least 1 of the 2 Rodda's Milk Cup games in the 2013–14 season, scoring 1 try. He may have played a second game but no information is available online.) | 1 | 0 | 0 | 0 | 5 |
| 2014–15 | Cornish Pirates | RFU Championship | 0 | 0 | 0 | 0 | 0 | 0 |
| 2014–15 | Cornish Pirates | British and Irish Cup | 0 | 0 | 0 | 0 | 0 | 0 |
| 2014–15 | Launceston | National League 2 South | 0 | 0 | 0 | 0 | 0 | 0 |
| 2014–15 | Camborne | Tribute South West 1 West | 17 | 14 | 0 | 0 | 5 | 85 |
| 2014–15 | Camborne | Cornwall Cup | 2 | 1 | 0 | 0 | 0 | 5 |
| 2014–15 | Camborne | Rodda's Milk Cup | 1 | 0 | 0 | 0 | 0 | 0 |
| 2015–16 | Redruth | National League 2 South | 3 | 2 | 0 | 0 | 0 | 10 |
| 2015–16 | Penryn | Tribute Western Counties West | 4 (Note: Ducker played at least 4 games for Penryn in 2015 between 21 November 2015 to 19 December 2015 before joining Camborne. Penryn list 3 of the games Ducker played in during this time, while St Austell state that Ducker played a game against them as well, scoring a try. However, there is no online details of Penryn's 17–28 defeat away to Truro on 28 November 2015 – a game Ducker is likely to have played and maybe even scored in.) | 6 | 0 | 0 | 0 | 30 |
| 2015–16 | Camborne | Tribute South West 1 West | 11 | 17 | 0 | 0 | 0 | 85 |
| 2015–16 | Camborne | Cornwall Cup | 1 | 3 | 0 | 0 | 0 | 15 |
| 2016–17 | Redruth | National League 2 South | 21 | 24 | 0 | 0 | 0 | 120 |
| 2016–17 | Redruth | Cornwall Super Cup / Rodda's Cup | 1 | 1 | 0 | 0 | 0 | 5 |
| 2017–18 | Hartpury College | RFU Championship | 2 | 0 | 0 | 0 | 0 | 0 |
| 2017–18 | Hartpury College | British and Irish Cup | 4 | 0 | 0 | 0 | 0 | 0 |
| 2017–18 | Redruth (Loan) | National League 2 South | 4 | 7 | 0 | 0 | 0 | 35 |
| 2018–19 | Camborne | South West Premier | 26 | 39 | 0 | 8 | 1 | 214 |
| 2018–19 | Camborne | Rodda's Cup | 0 | 0 | 0 | 0 | 0 | 0 |
| 2019–20 | Plymouth Albion | National League 1 | | | | | | |

=== County/Representative ===
| Season | Side | Competition | Appearances | Tries | Drop Goals | Conversions | Penalties | Total Points |
|---|---|---|---|---|---|---|---|---|
| 2013–14 | Cornwall | Tamar Cup | 1 | 0 | 0 | 0 | 0 | 0 |
| 2018–19 | Cornwall | Tamar Cup | 1 | 3 | 0 | 0 | 0 | 15 |
| 2018–19 | Cornwall | County Championship | 4 | 4 | 0 | 0 | 0 | 20 |

== Rugby league season-by-season playing stats ==
=== Club ===
| Season | Club | Competition | Appearances | Tries | Drop Goals | Conversions | Penalties | Total Points |
|---|---|---|---|---|---|---|---|---|
| 2013 | Cornish Rebels | South West Rugby League | 4 (Note: Ducker played at least 4 games for the Cornish Rebels during the 2015 South West Rugby League season (including playoffs). He may have played in up to 7 games that season, scoring more points, but press releases are very poor this season.) | 11 | 0 | 0 | 0 | 44 |
| 2013 | Cornish Rebels | South West Challenge Cup | 1 | 2 | 0 | 0 | 0 | 8 |
| 2015 | Cornish Rebels | South West Rugby League | 3 (Note: Ducker played at least 3 games for the Cornish Rebels during the 2015 South West Rugby League season (including playoffs). He may also have featured in the 38–40 league loss against Devon Sharks in July but there are no detailed match reports online that confirm this. Note that one of the Rebels league fixtures also doubled up as a South West Challenge Cup semi-final.) | 6 | 0 | 0 | 0 | 24 |
| 2015 | Cornish Rebels | South West Challenge Cup | 1 | 3 | 0 | 0 | 0 | 12 |

=== County/Representative ===
| Season | Club | Competition | Appearances | Tries | Drop Goals | Conversions | Penalties | Total Points |
|---|---|---|---|---|---|---|---|---|
| 2013 | Cornwall | County of Origin | 1 | 1 | 0 | 0 | 0 | 4 |
| 2015 | Cornwall | County of Origin | 1 (Note: Ducker played at least 1 test for Cornwall during the 2015 County of Origin games against Devon. He didn't play in the second test but may have played in the third, although this is unknown due to poor press coverage.) | 0 | 0 | 2 | 0 | 4 |

== Honours and records ==
=== Rugby Union ===
Camborne

- Cornwall Cup winners (2): 2014–15, 2015–16
- Tribute South West 1 West champions: 2015–16

Cornwall

- Tamar Cup winners (2): 2014, 2019
- County Championship Division 1 winners: 2019

2021

England

- Counties tour Georgia 2019
- premiership sevens

Individual

- County Championship Division 1 joint top try scorer: 2019 (4 tries)

=== Rugby League ===
Cornish Rebels

- South West Challenge Cup winners: 2013
- South West Rugby League Grand Final winners: 2015

Cornwall

- County of Origin winners: 2013
