= Rugby league in Cornwall =

Competitive rugby league was established in Cornwall in 2010 by Joe Catcheside, working on behalf of the Rugby Football League, who organised and established an annual fixture between Devon and Cornwall. Until this time all rugby league played in Cornwall had been exhibition matches and featured teams from outside the county. The first match between Devon and Cornwall was played in August 2010. The match is now played annually and is regularly billed as the "County Clash" or the "County of Origin" game and the teams play for the Martin Roddy MBE Trophy.

The Cornwall Rugby League Association currently has only one member; Cornish Rebels RLFC who were established in 2013 and play in the South West Premier Division. They were joined by Cornwall R.L.F.C. who played in the third tier of the professional game, RFL League One, from 2022 until they folded in 2025.

== History ==
The first rugby league matches to take place in Cornwall were a series of exhibition matches between Hull F.C. and Hull Kingston Rovers which took place on three consecutive evenings in June 1962. The first match was at the Mennaye Field (a rugby union ground); the home of Penzance–Newlyn RFC and the former club of Hull Kingston Rovers player Graham Paul. Two more matches took place at Camborne and Falmouth. There was an earlier attempt to introduce rugby league via a Western League in 1912.

Date	Won	Score	Lost	Venue	Attendance
4 June 1962	Hull	57–26	Hull Kingston Rovers	Mennaye Field, Penzance	2000
5 June 1962	Hull	38−26	Hull Kingston Rovers	Recreation Ground, Camborne	1500
6 June 1962	Hull	44−29	Hull Kingston Rovers	Recreation Ground, Falmouth	

The next matches to be played in Cornwall were in 1985 when Mansfield Marksman beat Carlisle in a challenge match at Penlee Park, Penzance and two Doncaster teams played each other at Looe in a second challenge match. The formation of the South West League in 1984−85 saw two amateur teams from Cheltenham and Bristol play at Ludgvan.

== Martin Roddy MBE Trophy ==
On 16 September 2010 the first team to represent Cornwall took to the field to play Devon at the Rectory Ground, Devonport. In 2012 the match was renamed from the Tamar Cup to the Martin Roddy MBE Trophy.

Date	Won	Score	Lost	Venue	Attendance	Match report
16 September 2010	Devon	44–20	Cornwall	Rectory Field, Plymouth		
24 August 2011	Devon	54–12	Cornwall	Mennaye Field, Penzance		
29 August 2012	Cornwall	32–24	Devon	Bitton Park, Teignmouth		
21 August 2013	Cornwall	36–26	Devon	Recreation Ground, Redruth	300	
2015	Devon		Cornwall	Recreation Ground, Redruth		
4 July 2015	Cornwall	40–34	Devon	Polson Bridge, Launceston		
23 August 2015				Bitton Park, Teignmouth		

- The 2011 match was sponsored by Leeds Rhinos as part of their commitment to develop the game in the south-west.
- The 2015 matches are contested as the County of Origin series

== Cornish Rebels ==
In March 2013 the first ever rugby league club was established in Cornwall. Cornish Rebels RLFC currently play in the South West Rugby League against Devon Sharks, Exeter Centurions, North Devon Raiders, Plymouth Titans and Somerset Vikings A. Their home matches are played at The Recreation Ground, home of rugby union club Redruth.

== Semi-professional club ==
Cornwall R.L.F.C. joined the professional league system in 2022, playing in the third tier RFL League 1. The club folded in 2025 due to financial problems.
