= 2019 Bill Beaumont County Championship Division 1 =

- Countries: England
- Date: 4 May 2019 - 2 June 2019
- Champions: Cornwall (6th title)
- Runners-up: Cheshire
- Matches played: 19
- Attendance: 13,403 (average 705 per match)
- Highest attendance: 3,500; Cheshire v Cornwall (2 June 2019)
- Lowest attendance: 247; Cheshire v Eastern Counties (4 May 2019)
- Tries scored: 153 (average 8.1 per match)
- Top point scorer: (England) Lewis Minikin (Yorkshire); 50 points
- Top try scorer: (England) Leo Fielding (Gloucestershire) (England) Tom Grimes (Lancashire) (England) Alex Ducker (Cornwall); 4 tries each

The 2019 Bill Beaumont County Championship Division 1 was the 119th version of the annual, English rugby union, County Championship organised by the Rugby Football Union (RFU) for the top tier English counties. Each county drew its players from rugby union clubs from the third tier and below of the English rugby union league system (typically National League 1, National League 2 North or National League 2 South). The counties were divided into two regional sections with the winners of each meeting in the final held at Twickenham Stadium. Lancashire were the reigning champions having defeated Hertfordshire in the previous year's final.

At the end of the group stage, Cheshire overcame stiff challenges from Lancashire and Yorkshire to top Division 1 North. Although they beat Yorkshire in a razor tight game during round 2, they had to rely on the same side to beat favourites Lancashire on the final match day, before they were assured of a place in the competition final. The tournament structure was perhaps slightly unkind to Yorkshire as they had to play the top two sides, while Cheshire and Lancashire avoided playing one another. Cornwall made amends for a terrible tournament the previous year by topping Division 1 South with a resounding victory over Hertfordshire being probably the most impressive of their three wins. Again, due to the rather bizarre tournament structure the top two sides in the group did not meet, although Gloucestershire failed to get the 100% record needed to qualify for the final, thanks to a defeat against Kent.

In an incredibly tight Twickenham final Cornwall defeated Cheshire 14–12. Cornwall had a 7–0 lead at the end of the first half thanks to a solo Alex Ducker converted try (his 4th of the tournament), when a moment of madness just before half-time saw Cornish scrum-half, Jack Oulton, red carded for an off-the-ball incident. The second half was all Cheshire as they looked to get back into the game against the 14 men of Cornwall, scoring two tries to eventually take a 12–7 lead with 10 minutes remaining. With a Cheshire win looking imminent, Cornwall were awarded a penalty inside the Cheshire 22. What followed was a series of Cornwall penalties and scrums, as Cheshire were reduced to 13 men for repeated infringements as the game went into injury time. Eight minutes into injury, the ball finally left the scrum and was found by Cornwall's Seti Raumakita, who dodged several tackles to go over for a try to make it 12-12. With the last kick of the game Matthew Shepherd held his nerve to kick the conversion and win Cornwall the 2019 County Championship, and their sixth overall.

== Competition format ==
The 2019 Bill Beaumont County Championship Division 1 consists of twelve county sides, with six counties in the northern group, and six in the southern group. Each county plays three games per group, which means that certain counties get two home games, while others just the one home game. The RFU have taken fixtures from the previous year into account so that county sides that only played one home game in that competition now get two games and vice versa. At the end of the group stage the top teams with the best record from each group (north and south) advance to the final held on 2 June 2019 at Twickenham Stadium. It is the top tier of county championship rugby.

Promotion into the division and relegation from it occurs every two seasons, with accumulated points taken into consideration. At the end of the 2017–18 season, East Midlands (north) and Surrey (south) were relegated due to pool results accumulated over the 2017 and 2018 competitions, although in East Midlands' case they actually took voluntary relegation due to difficulties in getting the top eligible clubs in their union to provide players for future competitions. They are replaced by Durham (north) and Hampshire (south), who were the highest ranked counties during the 2017 and 2018 Division 2 competitions, with Durham being the 2018 champions. This also means that there will be no promotion or relegation until the end of the 2020 competition.

== Participating counties and ground locations ==
County	Stadium(s)	Capacity	City/Area
Cheshire	Heywood Road; Upper Park	3,387	Sale, Greater Manchester; Birkenhead, Wirral
Cornwall	The Recreation Ground	3,500 (580 seats)	Redruth, Cornwall
Devon	Astley Park; Showground	1,800 (300 in stand); 1,120 (120 seats)	Brixham, Devon; Okehampton, Devon
Durham County	Ashbrooke		Sunderland, Tyne and Wear
Eastern Counties	The Haberden; Grantchester Road	3,000 (135 seats); 2,200 (200 seats)	Bury St Edmunds, Suffolk; Cambridge, Cambridgeshire
Gloucestershire	Dockham Road; Station Road	2,500; 2,500 (400 seats)	Cinderford, Gloucestershire; Patchway, Bristol
Hampshire	Gosport Park; Hook's Lane	1,500 (500 seats)	Gosport, Hampshire; Havant, Hampshire
Hertfordshire	Highfields		Ware, Hertfordshire
Kent	Priestfields		Rochester, Kent
Lancashire	Woodlands Memorial Ground	9,000	Lytham St Annes, Lancashire
Northumberland	Kingston Park	10,200	Newcastle upon Tyne, Tyne and Wear
Yorkshire	Wagon Lane; Laund Hill	4,000; 2,000 (240 seats)	Bingley, West Yorkshire; Huddersfield, West Yorkshire

Locations of the 2019 Division 1 county teams

== Group stage ==
=== Division 1 North ===
2019 Bill Beaumont Division 1 North Table
	County	Played	Won	Drawn	Lost	Points For	Points Against	Points Difference	Try Bonus	Losing Bonus	Points
1	Cheshire (Q)	3	3	0	0	99	52	47	2	0	14
2	Lancashire	3	2	0	1	150	40	110	2	1	11
3	Yorkshire	3	2	0	1	105	44	61	1	1	10
4	Northumberland	3	1	0	2	65	104	-39	2	1	7
5	Eastern Counties	3	1	0	2	60	110	-50	1	1	6
6	Durham County	3	0	0	3	31	160	-129	0	0	0
If teams are level at any stage, tiebreakers are applied in the following order: 1. Number of matches won 2. Difference between points for and against 3. Total number of points for 4. Aggregate number of points scored in matches between tied teams 5. Number of matches won excluding the first match, then the second and so on until the tie is settled
Green background means the county qualified for the final. Updated: 18 May 2019; Source: "County Championships". englandrugby.com.

==== Round 1 ====
4 May 2019
15:00

(1 BP) Cheshire	26 – 25	Eastern Counties (1 BP)
	Report

Heywood Road, Sale
Attendance: 247
Referee: Michael Harris

4 May 2019
15:00

Durham County	7 – 73	Lancashire (1 BP)
	Report

Ashbrooke, Sunderland
Attendance: 410
Referee: Alan Chandrachud

4 May 2019
15:00

(1 BP) Yorkshire	59 – 3	Northumberland
	Report

Wagon Lane, Bingley
Attendance: 587
Referee: Timothy Allatt

==== Round 2 ====
11 May 2019
12:30

(1 BP) Northumberland	35 – 17	Durham County
	Report

Kingston Park, Newcastle upon Tyne
Attendance: 379
Referee: Jamie Leahy

11 May 2019
15:00

Eastern Counties	7 – 57	Lancashire (1 BP)
	Report

Grantchester Road, Cambridge
Attendance: 348
Referee: Richard Haughton

11 May 2019
15:00

(1 BP) Yorkshire	20 – 21	Cheshire
	Report

Laund Hill, Huddersfield
Attendance: 564
Referee: James O'Brien

==== Round 3 ====
18 May 2019
15:00

(1 BP) Cheshire	52 – 7	Durham County

Upper Park, Birkenhead
Attendance: 421
Referee: Michael Harris

18 May 2019
15:00

(1 BP) Eastern Counties	28 – 27	Northumberland (2 BP)
	Report

The Haberden, Bury St Edmunds
Attendance: 389
Referee: Phillip Davies

18 May 2019
15:00

(1 BP) Lancashire	20 – 26	Yorkshire
	Report

Woodlands Memorial Ground, Lytham St Annes
Attendance: 965
Referee: Alexander Thomas

=== Division 1 South ===
2019 Bill Beaumont Division 1 South Table
	County	Played	Won	Drawn	Lost	Points for	Points against	Points difference	Try bonus	Losing bonus	Points
1	Cornwall (Q)	3	3	0	0	112	54	58	2	0	14
2	Gloucestershire	3	2	0	1	127	80	47	3	0	11
3	Kent	3	2	0	1	98	84	14	2	1	11
4	Hertfordshire	3	1	0	2	66	97	-31	2	0	6
5	Devon	3	1	0	2	64	131	-67	1	0	5
6	Hampshire	3	0	0	3	73	94	-21	1	1	2
If teams are level at any stage, tiebreakers are applied in the following order: 1. Number of matches won 2. Difference between points for and against 3. Total number of points for 4. Aggregate number of points scored in matches between tied teams 5. Number of matches won excluding the first match, then the second and so on until the tie is settled
Green background means the county qualified for the final. Updated: 18 May 2019; Source: "County Championships". englandrugby.com.

==== Round 1 ====
4 May 2019
14:30

Hampshire	20 – 29	Hertfordshire (1 BP)
	Report

Gosport Park, Gosport
Attendance: 281
Referee: Sam Phillips

4 May 2019
15:00

(1 BP) Gloucestershire	54 – 14	Devon
	Report

Dockham Road, Cinderford
Attendance: 250
Referee: Philip Davies

4 May 2019
15:00

(1 BP) Kent	21 – 25	Cornwall
	Report

Priestfields, Rochester
Attendance: 250
Referee: Andrew Wigley

==== Round 2 ====
11 May 2019
14:30

(1 BP) Devon	30 – 27	Hampshire (1 BP)
	Report

Showfield, Okehampton
Attendance: 350
Referee: James Milliner-Woodcock

11 May 2019
15:00

(1 BP) Cornwall	37 – 13	Hertfordshire
	Report

The Recreation Ground, Redruth
Attendance: 1,780
Referee: Dan Parrott

11 May 2019
15:00

(1 BP) Gloucestershire	33 – 42	Kent (1 BP)
	Report

Station Road, Patchway
Attendance: 384
Referee: Veryan Boscawen

==== Round 3 ====
18 May 2019
14:30

Devon	20 – 50	Cornwall (1 BP)
	Report

Astley Park, Brixham
Attendance: 1,450
Referee: Nick Wood

18 May 2019
15:00

(1 BP) Hampshire	26 – 35	Kent (1 BP)
	Report

Hook's Lane, Havant
Attendance: 498
Referee: Andrew MacNeaney

18 May 2019
15:00

(1 BP) Hertfordshire	24 – 40	Gloucestershire (1 BP)
	Report

Highfields, Ware
Attendance: 350
Referee: Jonathan Cook

== Final ==
2 June 2019
17:00

Cheshire	12 – 14	Cornwall
	Report

Twickenham Stadium, London
Attendance: 3,500
Referee: Phil Davies

== Total season attendances ==
- Does not include final at Twickenham which is a neutral venue and involves teams from all three county divisions on the same day

County	Home Games	Total	Average	Highest	Lowest	% Capacity
Cheshire	2	668	334	421	247	7%
Cornwall	1	1,780	1,780	1,780	1,780	51%
Devon	2	1,800	900	1,450	350	56%
Durham County	1	410	410	410	410	
Eastern Counties	2	737	369	389	348	14%
Gloucestershire	2	634	317	384	250	13%
Hampshire	2	779	390	498	281	33%
Hertfordshire	1	350	350	350	350	
Kent	1	250	250	250	250	
Lancashire	1	965	965	965	965	11%
Northumberland	1	379	379	379	379	4%
Yorkshire	2	1,151	576	587	564	21%

== Individual statistics ==
- Note that points scorers includes tries as well as conversions, penalties and drop goals. Appearance figures also include coming on as substitutes (unused substitutes not included). Statistics also include final.

=== Top points scorers ===
Rank	Player	County	Club Side	Appearances	Points
1	(England) Lewis Minikin	Yorkshire	Hull Ionians	3	50
2	(England) Leo Fielding	Gloucestershire	Blackheath	2	44
3	(England) Chris Johnson	Lancashire	Huddersfield	3	34
4	(England) Thomas Morton	Cheshire	Macclesfield	4	36
5	(England) Fraser Honey	Cornwall	Plymouth Albion	4	29

=== Top try scorers ===
Rank	Player	County	Club Side	Appearances	Tries
1	(England) Leo Fielding	Gloucestershire	Blackheath	2	4
1	(England) Tom Grimes	Lancashire	Fylde	3	4
1	(England) Alex Ducker	Cornwall	Camborne	4	4
2	(England) Nick Hankin	Hertfordshire	Bishop's Stortford	2	3
2	(England) Ricky McIntosh	Kent	Canterbury	2	3
2	(England) Alex Pickersgill	Kent	Blackheath	2	3
2	(England) Alex Ricci	Hertfordshire	Old Albanian	2	3
2	(England) Henry Roberts	Yorkshire	Rotherham Titans	2	3
2	(England) Tom Carleton	Lancashire	Fylde	3	3
2	(England) Sam Goatley	Gloucestershire	Clifton	3	3
2	(England) Brad Howe	Cornwall	Redruth	4	3

== Competition records ==
=== Team ===
Largest home win — 56 points

59 – 3 Yorkshire at home to Northumberland on 4 May 2019

Largest away win — 66 points

73 – 7 Lancashire away to Durham County on 4 May 2019

Most points scored — 73 points

73 – 7 Lancashire away to Durham County on 4 May 2019

Most tries in a match — 11

Lancashire away to Durham County on 4 May 2019

Most conversions in a match — 9

Lancashire away to Durham County on 4 May 2019

Most penalties in a match — 4

Yorkshire away to Lancashire on 18 May 2019

Most drop goals in a match — 1

Lancashire at home to Yorkshire on 18 May 2019

=== Attendances ===
Highest — 3,500

Cheshire v Cornwall on 2 June 2019 (Final)

Lowest — 247

Cheshire at home to Eastern Counties on 4 May 2019

Highest Average Attendance — 1,780

Cornwall

Lowest Average Attendance — 250

Kent

=== Player ===
Most points in a match — 29

(England) Leo Fielding for Gloucestershire at home to Devon on 4 May 2019

Most tries in a match — 3 (3)

(England) Leo Fielding for Gloucestershire at home to Devon on 4 May 2019
(England) Tom Grimes for Lancashire away to Durham County on 4 May 2019
(England) Henry Roberts for Yorkshire at home to Northumberland on 4 May 2019

Most conversions in a match — 9

(England) Chris Johnson for Lancashire away to Durham County on 4 May 2019

Most penalties in a match — 4

(England) Lewis Minikin for Yorkshire away to Lancashire on 18 May 2019

Most drop goals in a match — 1

(England) Chris Johnson for Lancashire at home to Yorkshire on 18 May 2019

== See also ==
- English rugby union system
- Rugby union in England
