= Cornish Rebels =

English amateur rugby league club

Club information
- Full name: Cornish Rebels RLFC
- Colours: black and gold
- Founded: 2013; 13 years ago

Current details
- Ground: The Recreation Ground, Redruth
- Competition: South West Rugby League

Cornish Rebels are an amateur rugby league team based in Redruth, Cornwall. They were founded in January 2013 by John Beach and Rob Butland. Cornish Rebels RLFC are affiliated with the Rugby Football League, rugby league's governing body in the UK.

Cornish Rebels RLFC currently play in the South West Rugby League, a tier four regional league.

== Men's team ==
After meeting in a local pub one night John Beach, Robert Butland and Laurence Belt decided that between them they could start their own rugby league club, the first ever to be established in the County of Cornwall. Until this time rugby league had never been played competitively at club level in Cornwall.

In preparation for the 2013 South West Premier season, Former Royal Navy hooker, Jonny Platt, was given the role of head coach.

Rebels finished runners-up in the annual pre-season South-West 9s tournament. The Rebels made their league debut with an 80 - 6 away win against South West Cup holders Exeter Centurions. This was followed by a 46–18 home win over South West Men's League champions Devon Sharks. A crowd of around 200 turned out to watch and the game was covered by BBC Radio Cornwall. Cornish Rebels then made it three wins out of three to maintain their status at the top of the South West Men's League by putting 100 points past Somerset Vikings A. A week later, they beat Plymouth Titans 56-10 also at Redruth. Eventually the Rebels finished with a 100% record in their first season, finishing top of the South West Premier Division by 2 points and a +244 points scored difference.

The Rebels won the South West Challenge Cup Final at Polson Bridge, Launceston. The game was played in blistering heat, and was tied after 80 minutes. The Rebels were eventual winners, led by Captain Kye Beasley, over opponents Devon Sharks.

The Rebels faced Devon Sharks in the Grand Final in their first year, after the Sharks finished second in the league, and beat the Rebels to become Grand Final Winners, after a lacklustre performance from the Rebels.

The first person to score a competitive try for Cornish Rebels was local-born fullback Darren Pellow, and the first man ever to score a competitive rugby league try in Cornwall at club level was Cornwall RFU second-row Ashley Lawton.

== Women's team ==
In 2021 the Rebels established a women's team who competed in the Betfred Super League South

=== Seasons ===
Season	League									Play-offs
Season	Division	P	W	D	L	F	A	Pts	Pos	Play-offs
2021	Super League South: Western Conference	4	0	1	3	28	170	1	3rd	Did not qualify

== Club honours ==
2013

- South West Premier Division League Leaders
- South West Challenge Cup Winners
- South West Grand Final Runners Up
- South West 9's Runners Up

2014

- Steve Prescott Foundation South West 9's Winners
- South West Premier Division League Leaders
- South West Grand Final Winners

== See also ==
- Rugby league in Cornwall
- Cornwall R.L.F.C.
