= North Devon Raiders =

English amateur rugby league club

Club information
- Full name: North Devon Raiders RLFC
- Colours: Royal blue and canary yellow
- Founded: 2009; 17 years ago

Current details
- Ground: Pottington Road, Barnstaple
- Competition: South West Rugby League

North Devon Raiders are a rugby league team based in Barnstaple, Devon. They play in the South West Rugby League.

== History ==
The North Devon Raiders were formed in 2009 and joined the South West division of the Rugby League Conference for the 2010 season.

Raiders lost to Exeter Centurions in the 2012 South West cup final after having beaten them 80-0 earlier in the season. They also lost out on the South West Rugby League title after defeat to Devon Sharks in the Grand Final.

== See also ==
- List of sports clubs inspired by others
