= Burntwood Barbarians =

English rugby league club, based in Burntwood, Staffordshire

Burntwood Barbarians Rugby League Club

Club information
- Full name: Burntwood Barbarians Rugby League Club
- Colours: Black and red
- Founded: 2006; 20 years ago
- Website: Burntwood Barbarians RLC

Current details
- Ground: Burntwood Rugby Club Sports Association, The Sportsway, Northshore, Burntwood WS7 3PH
- Competition: Midlands Rugby League

Burntwood Barbarians are a rugby league club founded in 2006, as part of the Burntwood Rugby Club Sports Association. Having played in the Rugby League Conference, West Midlands division for two seasons, the club currently play in the Midlands Rugby League.

They played their games at Burntwood rugby union club in Burntwood, Staffordshire and were founded by some players who previously played for Wolverhampton Wizards.

== History ==
Burntwood Barbarians joined the Rugby League Conference South West and West Midlands Division in 2006. Their first season in the Rugby League Conference was successful, reaching the play-offs and winning their eliminator against Plymouth. Unfortunately holiday traffic and accidents on the M5 caused them to miss their semi-final against Somerset Vikings.

They left the Conference at the end of the 2007 season and spent the 2008 as a non-playing side. The club joined the Kukri Midlands League in 2009, but did not enter the 2010 competition.
