= South Somerset Warriors =

Club information
- Full name: South Somerset Warriors Rugby League
- Founded: 2010
- Website: www.southsomersetwarriors.co.uk

Current details
- Ground: Ivel Barbarians RFC
- Competition: Rugby League Conference

South Somerset Warriors were a rugby league team based in Yeovil, Somerset. They played in the South West Division of the Rugby League Conference.

== History ==
South Somerset Warriors were formed in 2010 and joined the South West Division of the Rugby League Conference that same year; their first ever game was a 64 - 26 win against Somerset Vikings. They finished the season in 6th place.

In the 2011 season they were in the South West Division again but folded on 20 May after being unable to fulfil their fixtures.
