= 2015 Bill Beaumont Cup =

2015 Bill Beaumont Cup (County Championship)
- Countries: England
- Date: 9 May 2015 - 31 May 2015
- Champions: Cornwall (4th title)
- Runners-up: Lancashire
- Relegated: Kent, Durham County
- Matches played: 13
- Attendance: 9,803 (average 754 per match)
- Highest attendance: 2,800 Cornwall v Hertfordshire (23 May 2015)
- Lowest attendance: 250 Cheshire v Lancashire (9 May 2015)
- Top point scorer: (England) Matthew Shepherd; Cornwall 64
- Top try scorer: (England) Forbes Edwards; Cheshire 4

The 2015 Bill Beaumont Cup, also known as Bill Beaumont Cup Division One, was the 115th version of the annual, English rugby union, County Championship organized by the RFU for the top tier English counties. Each county drew its players from rugby union clubs from the third tier and below of the English rugby union league system (typically National League 1, National League 2 South or National League 2 North). The counties were divided into two regional pools with the winners of each pool meeting in the final held at Twickenham Stadium. New counties to the competition were the two finalists from the 2014 County Championship Plate – Kent (winners) and Durham County (runners-up) who replaced North Midlands and Northumberland. Lancashire were the defending champions.

At the end of the group stage, Lancashire won the northern division with relative ease to book their place in the final for the seventh successive year while Cornwall joined them, squeezing through by defeating Hertfordshire in the last game of the southern group having trailed 18 - 6 at half time. Both Durham County and Kent made an instant return to the 2016 County Championship Plate after being relegated by coming bottom of their respective groups. The 2015 final was a repeat of the previous two seasons with Cornwall this time turning the tables on holders Lancashire and winning their first county title since 1999 in an 18 - 13 victory. Cornish All Black scrum half Matthew Shepherd was man of the match with two tries and also finished as the competition's top scorer.

== Competition format ==
The competition format was two regional group stages divided into north and south, with each team playing each other once. This meant that two teams in the pool had two home games, while the other two had just one. The top side in each group went through to the final held at Twickenham Stadium on 31 May 2015. The bottom side in each group was relegated to the second tier of the county championships for the following season, with the finalists from that division replacing them.

== Participating Counties and ground locations ==
Locations of the 2015 Bill Beaumont Cup county teams

| County | Stadium(s) | Capacity | City/Area |
|---|---|---|---|
| Cheshire | Hare Lane | 2,000 | Chester, Cheshire |
| Cornwall | Recreation Ground | 3,500 (580 seats) | Redruth, Cornwall |
| Durham County | Crow Trees; The Darlington Arena | 2,000; 25,000 | Swalwell, Tyne and Wear; Darlington, County Durham |
| Gloucestershire | Dockham Road; The Hayfields | 2,500; N/A | Cinderford, Gloucestershire; Mangotsfield, Gloucestershire |
| Hertfordshire | Highfields | N/A | Ware, Hertfordshire |
| Kent | Merton Lane; Rectory Field | 1,500 (75 seats); N/A | Canterbury, Kent; Gravesend, Kent |
| Lancashire | Woodlands Memorial Ground | 9,000 | Lytham St Annes, Lancashire |
| Yorkshire | Lockwood Park; Castle Park | 1,500 (500 seats); 5,000 (1,650 seats) | Huddersfield, West Yorkshire; Doncaster, South Yorkshire |

== Group stage ==
=== Division 1 North ===
2015 Beaumont Cup Division 1 North Table
| | County | Played | Won | Drawn | Lost | Points For | Points Against | Points Difference | Try Bonus | Losing Bonus | Points |
| 1 | Lancashire (Q) | 3 | 3 | 0 | 0 | 67 | 24 | 29 | 1 | 0 | 13 |
| 2 | Cheshire | 3 | 2 | 0 | 1 | 95 | 80 | 15 | 1 | 1 | 10 |
| 3 | Yorkshire | 3 | 1 | 0 | 2 | 66 | 66 | 0 | 1 | 1 | 6 |
| 4 | Durham County (R) | 3 | 0 | 0 | 3 | 58 | 102 | –44 | 1 | 0 | 1 |
If teams are level at any stage, tiebreakers are applied in the following order: 1. Number of matches won 2. Difference between points for and against 3. Total number of points for 4. Aggregate number of points scored in matches between tied teams 5. Number of matches won excluding the first match, then the second and so on until the tie is settled
Green background means the county qualified for the final. Pink background means the county were demoted to Division 2 North of the County Championship Plate for the following season. Updated: 12 May 2015; Source: "County Championships". englandrugby.com.

==== Round 1 ====
9 May 2015
15:00

| (BP) Cheshire | 18 – 21 | Lancashire |
| | Report |

Hare Lane
Attendance: 250
Referee: Llyr Apgeraint-Roberts

9 May 2015
15:00

| (BP) Yorkshire | 33 – 12 | Durham County |
| | Report |

Lockwood Park, Huddersfield
Attendance: 446
Referee: Ben Davis

==== Round 2 ====
16 May 2015
15:00

| Durham County | 6 – 17 | Lancashire |
| | Report |

Crow Trees, Swalwell
Attendance: 320
Referee: Peter Steniford

16 May 2015
15:00

| (BP) Yorkshire | 19 – 25 | Cheshire |
| | Report |

Castle Park, Doncaster
Attendance: 550
Referee: Mike Harris

==== Round 3 ====
23 May 2015
15:00

| (BP) Durham County | 40 – 52 | Cheshire (BP) |
| | Report |

Darlington Arena, Darlington
Attendance: 380
Referee: Matt Turvey

23 May 2015
15:00

| (BP) Lancashire | 29 – 14 | Yorkshire |
| | Report |

Woodlands Memorial Ground, Lytham St Annes
Attendance: 1,200
Referee: Gareth Holsgrove

=== Division 1 South ===
2015 Beaumont Cup Division 1 South Table
| | County | Played | Won | Drawn | Lost | Points For | Points Against | Points Difference | Try Bonus | Losing Bonus | Points |
| 1 | Cornwall (Q) | 3 | 3 | 0 | 0 | 74 | 42 | 32 | 1 | 0 | 13 |
| 2 | Hertfordshire | 3 | 2 | 0 | 1 | 86 | 69 | 17 | 2 | 1 | 11 |
| 3 | Gloucestershire | 3 | 1 | 0 | 2 | 53 | 75 | –22 | 0 | 0 | 4 |
| 4 | Kent (R) | 3 | 0 | 0 | 3 | 46 | 73 | –27 | 0 | 1 | 1 |
If teams are level at any stage, tiebreakers are applied in the following order: 1. Number of matches won 2. Difference between points for and against 3. Total number of points for 4. Aggregate number of points scored in matches between tied teams 5. Number of matches won excluding the first match, then the second and so on until the tie is settled
Green background means the county qualified for the final. Pink background means the county were en demoted to Division 2 South of the County Championship Plate for the following season. Updated: 12 May 2015; Source: "County Championships". englandrugby.com.

==== Round 1 ====
9 May 2015
15:00

| Gloucestershire | 8 – 27 | Cornwall (BP) |
| | Report |

Dockham Road, Cinderford
Attendance: 562
Referee: Mike Hudson

9 May 2015
15:00

| Kent | 19 – 31 | Hertfordshire (BP) |
| | Report |

Merton Lane, Canterbury
Attendance: 250
Referee: Luis Caviglia

==== Round 2 ====
16 May 2015
15:00

| (BP) Hertfordshire | 37 – 25 | Gloucestershire |
| | Report |

Highfields, Ware
Attendance: 620
Referee: Luke Haskins

16 May 2015
15:00

| (BP) Kent | 16 – 22 | Cornwall |
| | Report |

Milton Road, Gravesend
Attendance: 600
Referee: Calum Howard

==== Round 3 ====
23 May 2015
15:00

| Cornwall | 25 – 18 | Hertfordshire (BP) |
| | Report |

The Recreation Ground, Redruth
Attendance: 2,800
Referee: Veryan Boscawen

23 May 2015
15:00

| Gloucestershire | 20 – 11 | Kent |
| | Report |

The Hayfields, Mangotsfield
Attendance: 325
Referee: Anthony Woodthorpe

== Final ==
31 May 2015
12:00

| Cornwall | 18–13 | Lancashire |
| Try: Shepherd (2); Con: Shepherd; Pen: Shepherd, Searle | Report | Try: Stewart; Con: Johnson; Pen: Collins, Johnson |

Twickenham Stadium, London
Attendance: 1,500
Referee: James Sullivan

| 15 | Billy Searle | Cornish All Blacks |
| 14 | Jon Dawe | Cornish All Blacks |
| 13 | Jake Murphy | Cornish All Blacks |
| 12 | Nielson Webber | Redruth |
| 11 | Robin Wedlake | Redruth |
| 10 | Lewis Webb | Taunton |
| 9 | Matthew Shepherd | Cornish All Blacks |
| 1 | Rupert Freestone | Clifton |
| 2 | Jamie Salter | Cornish All Blacks |
| 3 | Craig Williams | Redruth |
| 4 | Tony Whittle | Camborne |
| 5 | Ben Hilton | Cornish All Blacks |
| 6 | Chris Fuca | Redruth |
| 7 | George Jones | Penryn |
| 8 | Kyle Marriott (capt) | Redruth |
Replacements:
| 16 | Christian Judge | Cornish All Blacks |
| 17 | Damien Cook | Redruth |
| 18 | Tommy Phillips | Redruth |
| 19 | James Goldsworthy | Camborne |
| 20 | David Mankee | Camborne |
| 22 | Sam Parsons | Redruth |
| 23 | Barrie-John Chapman | Cornish All Blacks |

| 15 | Warren Spragg | Fylde |
| 14 | Jordan Dorrington | Fylde |
| 13 | Chris Briers | Fylde |
| 12 | Scott Rawlings | Fylde |
| 11 | Anthony Bingham | Rossendale |
| 10 | Steve Collins | Sedgley Park |
| 9 | Ryan De La Harpe | Fylde |
| 1 | Ben Black | Sedgley Park |
| 2 | Alex Loney | Fylde |
| 3 | Adam Lewis | Fylde |
| 4 | Jonathan Nugent | Bergerac |
| 5 | Gareth Rawlings | Fylde |
| 6 | Evan Stewart (capt) | Fylde |
| 7 | Steven McGinnis | Loughborough Students |
| 8 | Matthew Lamprey | Sedgley Park |
Replacements:
| 16 | Louis McGowan | Caldy |
| 17 | Peter Altham | Preston Grasshoppers |
| 18 | Philip Mills | Preston Grasshoppers |
| 19 | Paul Arnold | Fylde |
| 20 | Chris Johnson | Fylde |
| 21 | Oliver Brennand | Fylde |
| 22 | Niall Crossley | Hartpury College |

== Total season attendances ==
- Does not include final at Twickenham which is a neutral venue and involves teams from all three county divisions on the same day

| County | Home Games | Total | Average | Highest | Lowest | % Capacity |
|---|---|---|---|---|---|---|
| Cheshire | 1 | 250 | 250 | 250 | 250 | 13% |
| Cornwall | 1 | 2,800 | 2,800 | 2,800 | 2,800 | 80% |
| Durham County | 2 | 700 | 350 | 380 | 320 | 9% |
| Gloucestershire | 2 | 887 | 444 | 562 | 325 | 22% |
| Hertfordshire | 1 | 620 | 620 | 620 | 620 | |
| Kent | 2 | 850 | 425 | 600 | 250 | 17% |
| Lancashire | 1 | 1,200 | 1,200 | 1,200 | 1,200 | 13% |
| Yorkshire | 2 | 996 | 498 | 550 | 446 | 20% |

== Individual statistics ==
- Note if players are tied on tries or points the player with the lowest number of appearances will come first. Also note that points scorers includes tries as well as conversions, penalties and drop goals. Appearance figures also include coming on as substitutes (unused substitutes not included). Statistics will also include final.

=== Top points scorers ===
| Rank | Player | County | Club Side | Appearances | Points |
|---|---|---|---|---|---|
| 1 | (England) Matthew Shepherd | Cornwall | Cornish All Blacks | 4 | 64 |
| 2 | (England) Jack Lavin | Cheshire | Caldy | 3 | 31 |
| 3 | (England) Dan Watt | Hertfordshire | Old Albanian | 3 | 28 |
| 4 | (England) Chris Johnson | Lancashire | Fylde | 3 | 21 |
| 5 | (England) Forbes Edwards | Cheshire | Caldy | 3 | 20 |

=== Top try scorers ===
| Rank | Player | County | Club Side | Appearances | Tries |
|---|---|---|---|---|---|
| 1 | (England) Forbes Edwards | Cheshire | Caldy | 3 | 4 |
| 2 | (England) Matthew Shepherd | Cornwall | Cornish All Blacks | 4 | 4 |
| 3 | (England) Jordan Dorrington | Cheshire | Fylde | 3 | 3 |
| 4 | (England) Jack Lavin | Cheshire | Caldy | 3 | 3 |
| 5 | (England) Robin Wedlake | Cornwall | Redruth | 3 | 3 |

== See also ==
- English rugby union system
- Rugby union in England
