= East Devon Eagles =

English amateur rugby league club

Club information
- Full name: East Devon Eagles ARL
- Colours: Fuchsia pink with black trim, black shorts
- Founded: 2006; 20 years ago
- Website: www.eastdevoneagles.co.uk

Current details
- Ground: Imperial Recreation Ground, Exmouth
- Competition: Rugby League Conference

East Devon Eagles are a rugby league team based in Exmouth, Devon. They play in the South West Division of the Rugby League Conference.

== History ==
After a campaign by the Rugby Football League to form new clubs in the South West a rugby league game was staged between East Devon Eagles and Devon Sharks, then based at Newton Abbot. The Eagles were Devon Cup winners in 2006.

They joined the newly formed South West Division of the Rugby League Conference in 2007. They won the Devon Challenge Cup in a final against Plymouth Titans that was featured on Sky Sports. East Devon Eagles finished level on points with Devon Sharks who they beat 38-22 in a semi-final play-off.

They won the RLC South West Division in 2008 and made it to the final of the Devon Cup but lost 31-20 to Plymouth Titans.

They completed the 2009 regular season unbeaten before going down to Devon Sharks in the Grand Final. The Eagles won the successor to the Devon Cup, the South West Cup, beating Exeter Centurions at Plymouth Albion's Brickfields ground.

== Club honours ==
- Devon / South West Challenge Cup: 2006, 2007, 2009
- RLC South West: 2008, 2010
