= John Collins (rugby union, born 1928) =

England international rugby union player (born 1928)

- Full name: Philip John Collins
- Born: 4 November 1928 (age 98) Redruth, Cornwall, England

Rugby union career
- Position: Fullback
International career
Years	Team	Apps	(Points)
1952	England	3	(0)

Philip John Collins (born 4 November 1928) is an English former international rugby union player.

Born in Redruth, Collins is the son of local rugby player Phill Collins, who represented Cornwall against the touring 1924–25 All Blacks. He played his rugby as a fullback and in 1947 made his representative debut for Cornwall. In 1952, Collins made three Five Nations appearances for England, becoming the first international produced by Camborne RFC.

Collins is the oldest living former England international player.

== See also ==
- List of England national rugby union players
