= 2018 Bill Beaumont County Championship Division 1 =

- Countries: England
- Date: 5 May 2017 - 27 May 2018
- Champions: Lancashire (25th title)
- Runners-up: Hertfordshire
- Relegated: Northumberland, Surrey
- Matches played: 18
- Attendance: 6,967 (average 387 per match)
- Highest attendance: 1,515; Cornwall v Devon (6 May 2018)
- Lowest attendance: 150; Northumberland v East Midlands (19 May 2018)
- Tries scored: 150 (average 8.3 per match)
- Top point scorer: (England) Chris Johnson (Lancashire); 55 points
- Top try scorer: (England) Anthony Bingham (Lancashire); 5 tries

The 2018 Bill Beaumont County Championship Division 1 was the 118th version of the annual, English rugby union, County Championship organised by the Rugby Football Union (RFU) for the top tier English counties. Each county drew its players from rugby union clubs from the third tier and below of the English rugby union league system (typically National League 1, National League 2 North or National League 2 South). The counties were divided into two regional sections (each divided into two pools, for a total of four) with the winners of each meeting in the final held at Twickenham Stadium. Lancashire are the reigning champions having defeated Cornwall in the previous year's final.

Once again Lancashire finished as winners of the northern group stage with a 100% record to qualify for their second successive final, although group runners-up Yorkshire could feel aggrieved as they also had a 100% record, but lost out on points for/against. It showcased a real weakness in the new competition format as neither county had faced each other over the past two years, despite being the best sides in the northern group. Lancashire were joined by Hertfordshire who took advantage of a slip-up by Gloucestershire at Surrey to win the southern group and cement their place in the final - the county's first since 2012. By contrast last season's finalists Cornwall had a dire campaign, managing only one draw in their three games and finishing bottom of their group. Unlike Yorkshire, Cornwall can thank the RFU for the new format as promotion/relegation is over two seasons, saving Cornwall from the drop due to their excellent tournament the previous season.

In the Twickenham final Lancashire finished as deserving champions beating Hertfordshire 32-16, with 22 points coming from the boot Chris Johnson who also finished as the competition's top points scorer, while a try from his team-mate, Anthony Bingham, made him the top try scorer with 5 tries. It was the 25th cup win for a Lancashire side that has dominated the competition through its history. Relegated sides from the 2018 competition included East Midlands from the north and Surrey from the south. In Surrey's case they had actually looked safe, having finished a point clear of relegation rivals, Devon, but ultimately went down due to a 2 points deduction for fielding an ineligible player in their 15-15 draw with Cornwall earlier in the campaign. In East Midlands case they actually finished 3rd overall in the northern group competition over the two seasons but decided to take voluntary relegation due to difficulties in getting the top eligible clubs in their union to provide players for future competitions. Both East Midlands and Surrey will play in the 2019 Bill Beaumont County Championship Division 2 next season.

== Competition format ==
The 2018 Bill Beaumont County Championship Division 1 consists of twelve county sides, with six counties in the northern group, and six in the southern group. Each county plays three games per group, which means that some counties get two home games, and the others just the one home game. The RFU have taken fixtures from the previous year into account so that county sides that only played one home game in that competition now get two games and vice versa. At the end of the group stage the top teams with the best record from each group (north and south) advance to the final held on 27 May 2018 at Twickenham Stadium.

A continuation from the 2017 competition is that promotion/relegation occurs every two seasons instead of one, with points accumulated over the two seasons (2017 and 2018) taken into consideration. The two lowest ranked counties (one from the north/one from the south) will be relegated into the 2019 Bill Beaumont County Championship Division 2 competition, with the two highest aggregate ranked sides of that tournament being promoted to take their place.

== Participating Counties and ground locations ==
County	Stadium(s)	Capacity	City/Area
Cheshire	Hartsfield	2,000	Moreton, Merseyside
Cornwall	The Recreation Ground; Recreation Ground	3,500 (580 seats); 7,000 (780 seats)	Redruth, Cornwall; Camborne, Cornwall
Devon	Astley Park	1,800 (300 in stand)	Brixham, Devon
East Midlands	Dillingham Park; Goldington Road	3,000; 6,000 (1,700 seats)	Ampthill, Bedfordshire; Bedford, Bedfordshire
Eastern Counties	University Football Ground	1,500	Cambridge, Cambridgeshire
Gloucestershire	Regentsholme	1,500	Lydney, Gloucestershire
Hertfordshire	Rosedale Sports Club; Silver Leys	N/A; 1,600	Cheshunt, Hertfordshire; Bishop's Stortford, Hertfordshire
Kent	Goddington Dene; Jack Williams Ground	3,200 (200 seats); N/A	Orpington, London; Aylesford, Kent
Lancashire	Park Lane; Woodlands Memorial Ground	3,000; 9,000	Whitefield, Greater Manchester; Lytham St Annes, Lancashire
Northumberland	Preston Avenue; Tynedale Park	N/A; 2,000 (400 seats)	North Shields, Tyne and Wear; Corbridge, Northumberland
Surrey	Molesey Road	3,500 (1,200 seats)	Hersham, Surrey
Yorkshire	Silver Royd	4,500 (425 seats)	Scarborough, North Yorkshire

Locations of the 2018 Division 1 county teams

== Group stage ==
=== Division 1 North ===
2018 Bill Beaumont Division 1 North Table
	County	Played	Won	Drawn	Lost	Points For	Points Against	Points Difference	Try Bonus	Losing Bonus	Points
1	Lancashire (Q)	3	3	0	0	180	74	106	3	0	15
2	Yorkshire	3	3	0	0	99	72	27	3	0	15
3	Cheshire	3	1	0	2	91	122	-31	2	1	7
4	Eastern Counties	3	1	0	2	77	98	-21	1	1	6
5	Northumberland	3	1	0	2	76	114	-38	2	0	6
6	East Midlands (R)	3	0	0	3	55	98	-43	1	1	2
If teams are level at any stage, tiebreakers are applied in the following order: 1. Number of matches won 2. Difference between points for and against 3. Total number of points for 4. Aggregate number of points scored in matches between tied teams 5. Number of matches won excluding the first match, then the second and so on until the tie is settled
Green background means the county qualified for the final Pink background means the county were demoted to Division 2 for the following season. Updated: 19 May 2018; Source: "County Championships". englandrugby.com.

==== Round 1 ====
5 May 2018
15:00

(2BP) Cheshire	27 - 34	Yorkshire (BP)
	Cheshire

Hartsfield, Moreton
Attendance: 220
Referee: Timothy Allatt

5 May 2018
15:00

(BP) East Midlands	19 - 22	Eastern Counties
	East Midlands

Dillingham Park, Ampthill
Attendance: 350
Referee: Harry Walbaum

5 May 2018
15:00

(BP) Northumberland	20 - 64	Lancashire (BP)
	Lancashire

Preston Avenue, North Shields
Attendance: 250
Referee: Owen Taylor

==== Round 2 ====
12 May 2018
15:00

(BP) East Midlands	24–41	Cheshire (BP)
	East Midlands

Goldington Road, Bedford
Attendance: 220
Referee: Matt Astle

12 May 2018
15:00

(BP) Lancashire	52–31	Eastern Counties (BP)
	Lancashire

Park Lane, Whitefield
Attendance: 301
Referee: Michael Harris

12 May 2018
15:00

(BP) Yorkshire	38–21	Northumberland

Silver Royd, Scarborough
Attendance: 275
Referee: Joe James

==== Round 3 ====
19 May 2018
14:00

(BP) Eastern Counties	24 – 27	Yorkshire (BP)
	Eastern Counties

University Football Ground, Cambridge
Attendance: 309
Referee: Callum Howard

19 May 2018
15:00

(BP) Lancashire	64 – 23	Cheshire
	Lancashire

Woodlands Memorial Ground, Lytham St Annes
Attendance: 453
Referee: Tim Allatt

19 May 2018
15:00

(BP) Northumberland	35 – 12	East Midlands
	East Midlands

Tynedale Park, Corbridge
Attendance: 150
Referee: Alan Chandrachud

=== Division 1 South ===
2018 Bill Beaumont Division 1 South Table
	County	Played	Won	Drawn	Lost	Points for	Points against	Points difference	Try bonus	Losing bonus	Points
1	Hertfordshire (Q)	3	2	0	1	138	52	86	3	1	12
2	Gloucestershire	3	2	0	1	80	68	12	2	1	11
3	Kent	3	2	0	1	72	101	-29	1	0	9
4	Devon	3	1	0	2	73	86	-13	2	1	7
5	Surrey (R)	3	1	1	1	43	48	-5	0	1	3 (Note: Surrey deducted 2 points for fielding an ineligible player against Cornwall on 5 May 2018.)
6	Cornwall	3	0	1	2	34	85	-51	0	1	3
If teams are level at any stage, tiebreakers are applied in the following order: 1. Number of matches won 2. Difference between points for and against 3. Total number of points for 4. Aggregate number of points scored in matches between tied teams 5. Number of matches won excluding the first match, then the second and so on until the tie is settled
Green background means the county qualified for the final. Pink background means the county were demoted to Division 2 for the following season. Updated: 19 May 2018; Source: "County Championships". englandrugby.com.

==== Round 1 ====
5 May 2018
14:30

(BP) Devon	26 - 38	Gloucestershire (BP)
	Devon

Astley Park, Brixham
Attendance: 350
Referee: Henry Lowis

5 May 2018
15:00

Cornwall	15 - 15	Surrey
	Cornwall

The Recreation Ground, Redruth
Attendance: 815
Referee: Calum Howard

5 May 2018
15:00

(BP) Hertfordshire	59 - 21	Kent
	Hertfordshire

Rosedale Sports Club, Cheshunt
Attendance: 324
Referee: Robert Bourke

==== Round 2 ====
12 May 2018
15:00

(BP) Cornwall	19–20	Devon
	Cornwall

Recreation Ground, Camborne
Attendance: 1,515
Referee: Veryan Boscawen

12 May 2018
15:00

(BP) Gloucestershire	31–29	Hertfordshire (2BP)
	Gloucestershire

Regentsholm, Lydney
Attendance: 250
Referee: James O'Brien

12 May 2018
15:00

Kent	22–15	Surrey (BP)

Goddington Dene, Orpington, London
Attendance: 172
Referee: Daniel Collins

==== Round 3 ====
19 May 2018
15:00

(BP) Hertfordshire	50 – 0	Cornwall
	Cornwall

Silver Leys, Bishop's Stortford
Attendance: 610
Referee: Alexander Thomas

19 May 2018
15:00

(BP) Kent	29 – 27	Devon (2BP)

Jack Williams Ground, Aylesford
Attendance: 153
Referee: George Selwood

19 May 2018
15:00

Surrey	13 – 11	Gloucestershire (BP)
	Gloucestershire

Molesey Road, Hersham
Attendance: 250
Referee: Jonathan Cook

== Final ==
27 May 2018
12:00

Lancashire	31–16	Hertfordshire
Try: Bingham, Collins; Con: Johnson (2); Pen: Johnson (5); Drop: Johnson	Report	Try: Byfield (2); Pen: Taylor (2)

Twickenham Stadium, London

15	Lewis Allen	Rossendale
14	Scott Armstrong	Kirkby Lonsdale
13	Chris Mayor	Sale FC
12	Scott Rawlings	Longton
11	Anthony Bingham	Sale FC
10	Chris Johnson	Sale FC
9	Callum McShane	Sedgley Park
1	Dan Birchall	Sale FC
2	Alex Loney	Fylde
3	Adam Lewis (capt)	Fylde
4	Bob Birtwell	Sedgley Park
5	Rhys Davies	Sale FC
6	Evan Stewart	Vale of Lune
7	Phil Mills	Rossendale
8	Tom Ailes	Sale FC
Replacements:
16	Peter Altham	Preston Grasshoppers
17	Danny Maher	Sedgley Park
19	Reece Tomlinson	Rossendale
20	Adam Aigbokhae	Sale FC
21	Connor Wilkinson	Fylde
22	Scott Jordan	Preston Grasshoppers
23	Steve Collins	Sedgley Park

15	Sean Taylor	Hertford
14	Elliott Byfield	Tring
13	James Rea	Bishop's Stortford
12	Richard Streets	Hertford
11	Sam Barnes	Tring
10	Dan Watt	Old Albanian
9	Tom Banks (capt)	Bishop's Stortford
1	Louis Castiglione	Hertford
2	Steff Jones	Hertford
3	Karl Garside	Ampthill
4	Rob Conquest	Cambridge
5	Harry Green	Tring
6	Nick Radley	Tring
7	Nick Stevens	Tring
8	Chris West	Old Albanian
Replacements:
16	Oliver Walliker	Old Albanian
17	Tom McCrone	Bishop's Stortford
18	Dave Archer	Hertford
19	Jack Elston	Hertford
20	Jack Scantlebury	Bishop's Stortford
21	Ben Creasey	Hertford
22	Luke Barber	Harpenden

== Relegation aggregate table ==
In order to determine relegation to the 2019 Bill Beaumont County Championship Division 2, results from the 2017 and 2018 competitions will be combined, with the lowest ranked team from each group being relegated.

2017 and 2018 Bill Beaumont Division 1 North Table
	County	Played	Won	Drawn	Lost	Points For	Points Against	Points Difference	Try Bonus	Losing Bonus	Points
1	Lancashire	6	6	0	0	295	120	175	6	0	30
2	Yorkshire	6	6	0	0	220	126	94	5	0	29
3	East Midlands (R) (Note: Despite finishing 3rd overall over the two seasons, East Midlands decided to take voluntary relegation due to difficulties in getting the top eligible clubs in their union to provide players for future competitions.)	6	2	0	4	139	165	-26	3	1	12
4	Cheshire	6	2	0	4	145	201	-56	3	1	12
5	Eastern Counties	6	1	0	5	128	221	-93	1	2	7
6	Northumberland	6	1	0	5	138	232	-94	3	0	7
If teams are level at any stage, tiebreakers are applied in the following order: 1. Number of matches won 2. Difference between points for and against 3. Total number of points for 4. Aggregate number of points scored in matches between tied teams 5. Number of matches won excluding the first match, then the second and so on until the tie is settled
Pink background means the county were demoted to Division 2 for the following season.Updated: 12 May 2018

2017 and 2018 Bill Beaumont Division 1 South Table
	County	Played	Won	Drawn	Lost	Points for	Points against	Points difference	Try bonus	Losing bonus	Points
1	Gloucestershire	6	4	0	2	210	138	72	4	1	21
2	Hertfordshire	6	4	0	2	231	128	103	5	1	20 (Note: Hertfordshire were initially deducted 4 points for fielding an ineligible player against Kent on 6 May 2017. It was later reduced to a 2 point deduction.)
3	Kent	6	4	0	2	130	157	-27	2	1	19
4	Cornwall	6	3	1	2	169	138	31	3	1	18
5	Devon	6	1	0	5	116	225	-109	2	1	7
6	Surrey (R)	6	1	1	4	86	156	-70	0	2	6 (Note: Surrey deducted 2 points for fielding an ineligible player against Cornwall on 5 May 2018.)
If teams are level at any stage, tiebreakers are applied in the following order: 1. Number of matches won 2. Difference between points for and against 3. Total number of points for 4. Aggregate number of points scored in matches between tied teams 5. Number of matches won excluding the first match, then the second and so on until the tie is settled
Pink background means the county were demoted to Division 2 for the following season. Updated: 19 May 2018

== Total season attendances ==
- Does not include final at Twickenham which is a neutral venue and involves teams from all three county divisions on the same day

County	Home Games	Total	Average	Highest	Lowest	% Capacity
Cheshire	1	220	220	220	220	11%
Cornwall	2	2,330	1,165	1,515	815	22%
Devon	1	350	350	350	350	19%
East Midlands	2	570	285	350	220	8%
Eastern Counties	1	309	309	309	309	21%
Gloucestershire	1	250	250	250	250	17%
Hertfordshire	2	934	467	610	324	38%
Kent	2	325	163	172	153	5%
Lancashire	2	754	377	453	301	8%
Northumberland	2	400	200	250	150	8%
Surrey	1	250	250	250	250	7%
Yorkshire	1	275	275	275	275	6%

== Individual statistics ==
- Note that points scorers includes tries as well as conversions, penalties and drop goals. Appearance figures also include coming on as substitutes (unused substitutes not included). Statistics also include final.

=== Top points scorers ===
Rank	Player	County	Club Side	Appearances	Points
1	(England) Chris Johnson	Lancashire	Sedgley Park	3	55
2	(England) Sean Taylor	Hertfordshire	Hertford	4	44
3	(England) Stephen Collins	Lancashire	Sedgley Park	3	29
4	(England) Jack Blakeney-Edwards	Yorkshire	Darlington Mowden Park	3	24
5	(England) Ben Jones	Cheshire	Caldy	2	23

=== Top try scorers ===
Rank	Player	County	Club Side	Appearances	Tries
1	(England) Anthony Bingham	Lancashire	Sale FC	4	5
2	(England) Lewis Minikin	Yorkshire	Hull Ionians	3	4
2	(England) Phil Mills	Lancashire	Rossendale	4	4
3	(England) Stephen Collins	Lancashire	Sedgley Park	3	3
3	(England) Simon Frewin	Yorkshire	Sandal	3	3
3	(England) Matt Hema	Eastern Counties	Cambridge	3	3
3	(England) Steve Nolson	Yorkshire	Otley	3	3
3	(New Zealand) Dan Smart	Kent	Canterbury	3	3
3	(England) Scott Rawlings	Lancashire	Longton	4	3
3	(England) Evan Stewart	Lancashire	Vale of Lune	4	3

== Competition records ==
=== Team ===
Largest home win — 50 points

50 - 0 Hertfordshire at home to Cornwall on 19 May 2018

Largest away win — 44 points

64 - 20 Lancashire away to Northumberland on 5 May 2018

Most points scored — 64 points (2)

Lancashire away to Northumberland on 5 May 2018
Lancashire at home to Cheshire on 19 May 2018

Most tries in a match — 10

Lancashire away to Northumberland on 5 May 2018

Most conversions in a match — 8

Lancashire at home to Cheshire on 19 May 2018 Lancashire at home to Eastern Counties on 12 May 2018

Most penalties in a match — 5

Lancashire versus Hertfordshire at Twickenham on 27 May 2018

Most drop goals in a match — 1

Lancashire versus Hertfordshire at Twickenham on 27 May 2018

=== Attendances ===
Highest — 1,515

Cornwall at home to Devon on 12 May 2018

Lowest — 150

Northumberland at home to East Midlands on 19 May 2018

Highest Average Attendance — 1,183

Cornwall

Lowest Average Attendance — 163

Kent

=== Player ===
Most points in a match — 22

(England) Chris Johnson for Lancashire versus Hertfordshire at Twickenham on 27 May 2018

Most tries in a match — 3

(England) Anthony Bingham for Lancashire at home to Cheshire on 19 May 2018

Most conversions in a match — 8

(England) Chris Johnson for Lancashire at home to Cheshire on 19 May 2018

Most penalties in a match — 5

(England) Chris Johnson for Lancashire versus Hertfordshire at Twickenham on 27 May 2018

Most drop goals in a match — 1

(England) Chris Johnson for Lancashire versus Hertfordshire at Twickenham on 27 May 2018

== See also ==
- English rugby union system
- Rugby union in England
