= 2017 Bill Beaumont County Championship Division 1 =

- Countries: England
- Date: 6 May 2017 - 28 May 2017
- Champions: Lancashire (24th title)
- Runners-up: Cornwall
- Matches played: 19
- Attendance: 27,548 (average 1,450 per match)
- Highest attendance: 7,000; Lancashire v Cornwall on 28 May 2017
- Lowest attendance: 150; Gloucestershire v Devon on 6 May 2017
- Tries scored: 149 (average 7.8 per match)
- Top point scorer: (England) Sam Goatley (Gloucestershire) / (England) Calum Irvine (Yorkshire) 35
- Top try scorer: (England) Sam Goatley (Gloucestershire) 7

The 2017 Bill Beaumont County Championship Division 1 was the 117th version of the annual, English rugby union, County Championship organised by the RFU for the top tier English counties. This was the first season it would be officially known as Bill Beaumont Division 1 having previously been known as the Bill Beaumont Cup. Each county drew its players from rugby union clubs from the third tier and below of the English rugby union league system (typically National League 1, National League 2 North or National League 2 South). The counties were divided into two regional sections (each divided into two pools, for a total of four) with the winners of each meeting in the final held at Twickenham Stadium. Cornwall were the defending champions.

Due to changes to the County Championship format (more detail of this below) four new teams were added to the competition, with East Midlands and Northumberland joining the northern section, while Kent and Devon joined the south. East Midlands (winners) and Kent (runners up) were promoted after reaching the final of the 2016 County Championship Plate, while Northumberland and Devon were promoted by virtue of their performances in the competition over the past couple of seasons. It also saw a lucky escape for the likes of Yorkshire, who would have been playing tier 2 rugby this year were it not for the competition restructuring.

By the end of the group stages, Lancashire and Cornwall came top of their respective pools, winning all three of their games with a bonus point in each to qualify for the final in what would be the fourth county championship final between the two sides. Lancashire possibly had the harder time of it as they edged rivals Yorkshire by just one point with neither side playing each other due to the new format, while Cornwall won all their games. In the Twickenham final, the first half started with Cornwall dominant in taking an 8-0 lead into the break - although they perhaps should have capitalized more on a Lancashire yellow card towards the end of the half. The second half was a completely different story, however, as Lancashire played some breath-taking rugby scoring three delightful tries to take the game 19-8, ending Cornwall's hope of a treble of championships, and claiming the 24th county championship title for the Red Rose.

== Competition format ==
The 2017 County Championships saw a new competition structure introduced across all three divisions. In tier 1 there were now twelve teams instead of the eight from 2016, with six counties in the northern group, and six in the southern group. To complicate matters further, each county only played three games per group instead of five. This meant that some counties had two home games, while the others had just one. The RFU plans to switch this around the following year so that teams that played one home game in 2017 will get two during the 2018 competition - it is assumed that this is against the three teams in the group they did not play the previous season.

At the end of the group stage the top teams with the best record from each group (north and south) advanced to the final held on 28 May 2017 at Twickenham Stadium. A further change will see relegation occur every two seasons instead of one, with points accumulated over the two seasons taken into consideration. This system will also apply to promoted teams in tier 2.

== Participating Counties and ground locations ==
| County | Stadium(s) | Capacity | City/Area |
|---|---|---|---|
| Cheshire | Paton Field; Heywood Road | 4,000; 3,387 | Thurstaston, Wirral, Merseyside; Sale, Greater Manchester |
| Cornwall | Recreation Ground | 7,000 (780 seats) | Camborne, Cornwall |
| Devon | Cross-in-Hand; Pottington Road | N/A; 2,000 (600 seats) | Ivybridge, Devon; Barnstaple, Devon |
| East Midlands | Dillingham Park | 3,000 | Ampthill, Bedfordshire |
| Eastern Counties | Grantchester Road; University Football Ground | 2,200 (200 seats); 1,500 | Cambridge, Cambridgeshire; Cambridge, Cambridgeshire |
| Gloucestershire | The Hayfields; Regentsholm | N/A; 1,500 | Mangotsfield, Gloucestershire; Lydney, Gloucestershire |
| Hertfordshire | Highfields | N/A | Ware, Hertfordshire |
| Kent | Broad Walk | N/A | Kidbrooke, London |
| Lancashire | Woodlands Memorial Ground | 9,000 | Lytham St. Annes, Lancashire |
| Northumberland | Greensfield | 1,200 (200 in stand) | Alnwick, Northumberland |
| Surrey | Athletic Ground; The Big Field | 4,500 (1,000 seats); 1,500 | Richmond, London; Dorking, Surrey |
| Yorkshire | Lockwood Park; Brantingham Park | 1,500 (500 seats); 1,500 (240 seats) | Huddersfield, West Yorkshire; Brantingham, East Riding of Yorkshire |

Locations of the 2017 Division 1 county teams

== Group stage ==
=== Division 1 North ===
2017 Bill Beaumont Division 1 North Table
| | County | Played | Won | Drawn | Lost | Points For | Points Against | Points Difference | Try Bonus | Losing Bonus | Points |
| 1 | Lancashire (Q) | 3 | 3 | 0 | 0 | 115 | 46 | 69 | 3 | 0 | 15 |
| 2 | Yorkshire | 3 | 3 | 0 | 0 | 121 | 54 | 67 | 2 | 0 | 14 |
| 3 | East Midlands | 3 | 2 | 0 | 1 | 84 | 67 | 17 | 2 | 0 | 10 |
| 4 | Cheshire | 3 | 1 | 0 | 2 | 54 | 79 | -25 | 1 | 0 | 5 |
| 5 | Northumberland | 3 | 0 | 0 | 3 | 62 | 118 | -56 | 1 | 0 | 1 |
| 6 | Eastern Counties | 3 | 0 | 0 | 3 | 51 | 123 | -72 | 0 | 1 | 1 |
If teams are level at any stage, tiebreakers are applied in the following order: 1. Number of matches won 2. Difference between points for and against 3. Total number of points for 4. Aggregate number of points scored in matches between tied teams 5. Number of matches won excluding the first match, then the second and so on until the tie is settled
Green background means the county qualified for the final.Updated: 20 May 2017; Source: "County Championships". englandrugby.com.

==== Round 1 ====
6 May 2017
14:15

| (BP) Eastern Counties | 21 - 24 | East Midlands (BP) |
| | Report |

Grantchester Road, Cambridge
Attendance: 300
Referee: Jack Sutton

6 May 2017
15:00

| (BP) Lancashire | 48 - 28 | Northumberland (BP) |
| | Report |

Woodlands Memorial Ground, Lytham St. Annes
Attendance: 545
Referee: Llyr ApGeraint-Roberts

6 May 2017
15:00

| Yorkshire | 26 - 17 | Cheshire |
| | Report |

Lockwood Park, Huddersfield
Attendance: 436
Referee: Andrew Wigley

==== Round 2 ====
13 May 2017
14:15

| Eastern Counties | 15 - 38 | Lancashire (BP) |
| | Report |

University Football Ground, Cambridge
Attendance: 314
Referee: Neil Chivers

13 May 2017
15:00

| (BP) Cheshire | 32 - 24 | East Midlands |
| | Report |

Paton Field, Thurstaston
Attendance: 325
Referee: Matt Turvey

13 May 2017
15:00

| Northumberland | 22 - 34 | Yorkshire (BP) |

Greensfield, Alnwick
Attendance: 256
Referee: Ieuan Davies

==== Round 3 ====
20 May 2017
15:00

| Cheshire | 5 - 29 | Lancashire (BP) |

Heywood Park, Sale
Attendance: 450
Referee: Andrew Wrigley

20 May 2017
15:00

| (BP) East Midlands | 36 - 14 | Northumberland |
| | Report |

Dillingham Park, Ampthill
Attendance: 350
Referee: Claire Hodnett

20 May 2017
15:00

| (BP) Yorkshire | 61 - 15 | Eastern Counties |

Brantingham Park, Brantingham
Attendance: 484
Referee: Ieuan Davies

=== Division 1 South ===
2017 Bill Beaumont Division 1 South Table
| | County | Played | Won | Drawn | Lost | Points for | Points against | Points difference | Try bonus | Losing bonus | Points |
| 1 | Cornwall (Q) | 3 | 3 | 0 | 0 | 135 | 53 | 82 | 3 | 0 | 15 |
| 2 | Gloucestershire | 3 | 2 | 0 | 1 | 130 | 70 | 60 | 2 | 0 | 10 |
| 3 | Kent | 3 | 2 | 0 | 1 | 58 | 56 | 2 | 1 | 1 | 10 |
| 4 | Hertfordshire | 3 | 2 | 0 | 1 | 93 | 76 | 17 | 2 | 0 | 8 (Note: Hertfordshire were initially deducted 4 points for fielding an ineligible player against Kent on 6 May 2017. It was later reduced to a 2 point deduction.) |
| 5 | Surrey | 3 | 0 | 0 | 3 | 43 | 108 | -65 | 0 | 1 | 1 |
| 6 | Devon | 3 | 0 | 0 | 3 | 43 | 139 | -96 | 0 | 0 | 0 |
If teams are level at any stage, tiebreakers are applied in the following order: 1. Number of matches won 2. Difference between points for and against 3. Total number of points for 4. Aggregate number of points scored in matches between tied teams 5. Number of matches won excluding the first match, then the second and so on until the tie is settled
Green background means the county qualified for the final.Updated: 20 May 2017; Source: "County Championships". englandrugby.com. Notes

==== Round 1 ====
6 May 2017
15:00

| (BP) Gloucestershire | 55 - 12 | Devon |
| | Report |

The Hayfields, Mangotsfield
Attendance: 150
Referee: James Clarke

6 May 2017
15:00

| (BP) Kent | 12 - 19 | Hertfordshire |
| | Report |

Broad Way, Kidbrooke, London
Attendance: 452
Referee: Gareth Holsgrove

6 May 2017
15:00

| Surrey | 14 - 34 | Cornwall (BP) |
| | Report |

Athletic Ground, Richmond, London
Attendance: 643
Referee: Neil Chivers

==== Round 2 ====
13 May 2017
15:00

| Devon | 11 - 56 | Cornwall (BP) |
| | Report |

Cross-in-Hand, Ivybridge
Attendance: 1,025
Referee: Robert Bourke

13 May 2017
15:00

| (BP) Hertfordshire | 46 - 19 | Gloucestershire |
| | Report |

Highfields, Ware
Attendance: 450
Referee: Philip Davies

13 May 2017
15:00

| (BP) Surrey | 17 - 18 | Kent |
| | Report |

The Big Field, Dorking
Attendance: 231
Referee: Calum Howard

==== Round 3 ====
20 May 2017
15:00

| (BP) Cornwall | 45 - 28 | Hertfordshire (BP) |
| | Report |

Recreation Ground, Camborne
Attendance: 3,525
Referee: Ben Russell

20 May 2017
15:00

| Devon | 20 - 28 | Kent (BP) |

Pottington Road, Barnstaple
Attendance: 412
Referee: Kevin Williams

20 May 2017
15:00

| (BP) Gloucestershire | 56 - 12 | Surrey |
| | Report |

Regentsholm, Lydney
Attendance: 200
Referee: James Milliner

== Final ==
28 May 2017
12:00

| Lancashire | 19–8 | Cornwall |
| Try: Bingham, Burtonwood, Armstrong; Con: Johnson (2) | Report | Try: Jones; Pen: Shepherd |

Twickenham Stadium, London
Attendance: 7,000
Referee: Ben Blain

| 15 | Lewis Allen | Preston Grasshoppers |
| 14 | Scott Armstrong | Fylde |
| 13 | Chris Briers | Fylde |
| 12 | Scott Rawlings | Sale FC |
| 11 | Anthony Bingham | Fylde |
| 10 | Chris Johnson | Sale FC |
| 9 | Sam Stelmaszek | Fylde |
| 1 | Dan Birchall | Fylde |
| 2 | Tom Burtonwood | Fylde |
| 3 | Adam Lewis | Fylde |
| 4 | Bob Birtwell | Sedgley Park |
| 5 | Reece Tomlinson | Rossendale |
| 6 | Mark Goodwin | Sedgley Park |
| 7 | Evan Stewart (capt) | Fylde |
| 8 | Tom Ailes | Sale FC |
Replacements:
| 16 | Peter Altham | Preston Grasshoppers |
| 17 | Johnny Matthews | Sedgley Park |
| 18 | Simon Griffiths | Fylde |
| 19 | Greg Smith | Fylde |
| 20 | Connor Wilkinson | Fylde |
| 21 | Rhys Davies | Sale FC |
| 22 | Steve Collins | Sedgley Park |
| 23 | Ciaran Connolly | Sale FC |

| 15 | Matthew Shepherd | Plymouth Albion |
| 14 | Seti Raumakita | Plymouth Albion |
| 13 | Robin Wedlake | Plymouth Albion |
| 12 | Jake Murphy (capt) | Barnstaple |
| 11 | Tom Notman | Redruth |
| 10 | Jake Elderkin | Redruth |
| 9 | Jack Oulton | Redruth |
| 1 | Tommy Phillips | Redruth |
| 2 | Richard Brown | Redruth |
| 3 | Craig Williams | Redruth |
| 4 | Tony Whittle | Camborne |
| 5 | Bryn Jenkins | Barnstaple |
| 6 | George Jones | Penryn |
| 7 | Sam Matavesi | Camborne |
| 8 | Grant Randlesome | Penryn |
Replacements:
| 16 | Matt Ballard | Wadebridge Camels |
| 17 | Dan Collier | Plymouth Albion |
| 18 | Jack Simmons | Camborne |
| 19 | Andrius Zacharovas | Camborne |
| 20 | Chris Fuca | Redruth |
| 22 | David Mankee | Camborne |
| 23 | Barrie-John Chapman | Redruth |

== Total season attendances ==
- Does not include final at Twickenham which is a neutral venue and involves teams from all three county divisions on the same day

| County | Home Games | Total | Average | Highest | Lowest | % Capacity |
|---|---|---|---|---|---|---|
| Cheshire | 2 | 775 | 388 | 450 | 325 | 11% |
| Cornwall | 1 | 3,525 | 3,525 | 3,525 | 3,525 | 50% |
| Devon | 2 | 1,437 | 719 | 1,025 | 412 | 21% |
| East Midlands | 1 | 350 | 350 | 350 | 350 | 12% |
| Eastern Counties | 2 | 614 | 307 | 314 | 300 | 17% |
| Gloucestershire | 2 | 350 | 175 | 200 | 150 | 13% |
| Hertfordshire | 1 | 450 | 450 | 450 | 450 | |
| Kent | 1 | 452 | 452 | 452 | 452 | |
| Lancashire | 1 | 545 | 545 | 545 | 545 | 6% |
| Northumberland | 1 | 256 | 256 | 256 | 256 | 21% |
| Surrey | 2 | 874 | 437 | 643 | 231 | 15% |
| Yorkshire | 2 | 920 | 460 | 484 | 436 | 31% |

== Individual statistics ==
- Note if players are tied on tries or points the player with the lowest number of appearances will come first. Also note that points scorers includes tries as well as conversions, penalties and drop goals. Appearance figures also include coming on as substitutes (unused substitutes not included). Statistics will also include final.

=== Top points scorers ===
| Rank | Player | County | Club Side | Appearances | Points |
|---|---|---|---|---|---|
| 1 | (England) Sam Goatley | Gloucestershire | Cinderford | 3 | 35 |
| 1 | (England) Calum Irvine | Yorkshire | Hull Ionians | 3 | 35 |
| 2 | (England) Tom Banks | Hertfordshire | Bishop's Stortford | 3 | 28 |
| 2 | (England) David Mankee | Cornwall | Camborne | 3 | 28 |
| 3 | (England) Tom Stradwick | Kent | Blackheath | 3 | 25 |

=== Top try scorers ===
| Rank | Player | County | Club Side | Appearances | Tries |
|---|---|---|---|---|---|
| 1 | (England) Sam Goatley | Gloucestershire | Cinderford | 4 | 7 |
| 2 | (England) Tom Stradwick | Kent | Blackheath | 3 | 5 |
| 3 | (England) Scott Armstrong | Lancashire | Fylde | 4 | 4 |
| 3 | (England) Lewis Minikin | Yorkshire | Hull Ionians | 3 | 4 |
| 3 | (England) Pete Swatkins | Yorkshire | Sheffield Tigers | 3 | 4 |

== Competition records ==
=== Team ===
Largest home win — 46 points

61 - 15 Yorkshire at home to Eastern Counties on 20 May 2017

Largest away win — 45 points

56 - 11 Cornwall away to Devon on 13 May 2017

Most points scored — 61 points

61 - 15 Yorkshire at home to Eastern Counties on 20 May 2017

Most tries in a match — 9

Yorkshire at home to Eastern Counties on 20 May 2017

Most conversions in a match — 8

Yorkshire at home to Eastern Counties on 20 May 2017

Most penalties in a match — 3

Yorkshire at home to Cheshire on 6 May 2017

Most drop goals in a match — 0

=== Player ===
Most points in a match — 20

(England) Sam Goatley for Gloucestershire at home to Devon on 6 May 2017

Most tries in a match — 4

(England) Sam Goatley for Gloucestershire at home to Devon on 6 May 2017

Most conversions in a match — 5 (x3)

(England) Calum Irvine for Yorkshire at home to Northumberland on 20 May 2017
(England) James Moffat for Gloucestershire at home to Surrey on 20 May 2017
(England) Matthew Shepherd for Cornwall at home to Hertfordshire on 20 May 2017

Most penalties in a match — 3

(England) Calum Irvine for Yorkshire at home to Cheshire on 6 May 2017

Most drop goals in a match — 0

=== Attendances ===
Highest — 3,525

Cornwall at home to Hertfordshire on 13 May 2017

Lowest — 150

Gloucestershire at home to Devon on 6 May 2017

Highest Average Attendance — 3,525

Cornwall

Lowest Average Attendance — 150

Gloucestershire

== See also ==
- English rugby union system
- Rugby union in England
