= Plymouth Titans =

English amateur rugby league club

Club information
- Full name: Plymouth Titans Rugby League Football Club
- Colours: Green, White and Black
- Founded: 1985; 41 years ago
- Website: http://www.pitchero.com/clubs/plymouthtitansrlfc/

Current details
- Ground: Horsham Fields, Plymouth
- Competition: South West Rugby League

Plymouth Rugby League Football Club is a rugby league club based in Plymouth.

The club is a member of the South West Rugby League, playing home matches at Horsham Fields, Plymouth.

== History ==
=== History of rugby league in the South West ===
The first attempt at forming a club was in the Northern Union days of 1912 when in a dispute over inducements to players, attempts were made to form a Western League of clubs in Devon and Cornwall. Huddersfield beat Oldham 31–26 in an exhibition game at South Devon Place (the home of Plymouth RFC) before 8000 spectators and as a result a meeting was held and the Plymouth Northern Union Club formed. In July, the Northern Union club took over South Devon Place and as a result the ailing Plymouth RFC disbanded, later to re-emerge as part of a merger with Devonport Albion to become Plymouth Albion.

At Christmas, Coventry Northern Union beat Plymouth twice before a number of games were played against local opposition in the new year including Newton Abbot, Teignmouth, Torquay and Paignton (plus a 27–17 defeat at the hands of St. Helens at their home ground South Devon Place (now Astor Field) on Embankment Road. An international was staged at South Devon Place with a crowd of 7000 witnessing England's victory over Wales 40–16 on 15 February 1913 (a Wales and West side had beaten England 27–25 at Home Park on 10 September 1910 following the return of the Northern Union tourists from Australasia) and Devon clubs hosted a touring Northern Union Combination which Plymouth thrashed 33–3 but the club along with the league folded during the summer of 1913 due to Plymouth losing the lease at South Devon Place (which was bought by the Astor family and given to the people of Plymouth as Astor Field) and Torquay were refused permission to share the Recreation Ground with Torquay Athletic RFC.

The majority of players returned to union though some moved north to continue their 13-a-side careers with Willie Davies and Dave Holland representing the Northern Union (now Great Britain) on the 1914 tour of Australia and New Zealand. Another well-known figure from that era was James Peters who was the first black player to represent England at rugby union before playing league for Plymouth and then moving on to play for Barrow. Peters was recently the subject of an exhibition at Twickenham.

No rugby league was played in the area for another forty-four years until Leigh and Barrow toured Devon in 1947 and later Hull F.C. and Hull Kingston Rovers played three games in Cornwall during the summer of 1962.

In 1985, following the formation of the Cheltenham club the previous year, another club was formed in Plymouth following an inquiry by Lionel Hurst, the instigator of what as to become the Midlands and South West Amateur Rugby League Association (MASWARLA). The first game was played at Pittville Park, Cheltenham on Sunday 12 May 1985. Plymouth trailed 22–2 at half time but rallied to win 30–26 and enough interest was shown to enter the MASWARLA League for the 1985/6 season. The club remained in the league until 1992 as first Plymouth-Tamarside and latterly Plymouth City. Problems with teams travelling down for games and the final disbanding of the MASWARLA League left the club out on a limb and the club disbanded due to lack of fixtures.

The following year, plans were made for a local competition, and in December 1993 a four-team league began with West Park Warriors, Stonehouse Saints, Devonport Pirates and the St. Budeaux Bulldogs competing for the Plymouth and District League, eventually won by Stonehouse, and the League played hosts to Wigan St. Judes and Wigan Tech at the end of the season. However, the momentum was lost the following season and the league collapsed.

=== Plymouth RLFC ===
Apart from a couple of visits by Wigan St. Judes playing against scratch sides at the end of the rugby union season there was little activity in the area until a group of friends advertised on the RLFans.com website in 2001 aiming to form a club to join the Rugby League Conference. The Plymouth Rock RLFC never really caught on and after failing to attract sponsorship and players the club failed.

However a number of the group along with Ray Pickavance from St Helens revived the idea in 2003. After a flurry of emails and telephone conversations the club had its first meeting at the Fortescue pub on Mutley Plain. Numbers grew and the club – now based at the new Stonehouse Creek Leisure and Social Club on Stonehouse Creek – played its first games at the Bristol and West 9s on 16 May 2004. Despite losing three of their games and drawing the other the club had given a taste of the game to a number of new players and the first full 13-a-side game was played away to Blandford Bulldogs in Dorset on 3 July 2004 with a return game on the Creek on 15 August. Despite losing both games interest was maintained and the club successfully applied for membership of the Rugby League Conference in January 2005.

Despite early setbacks and a number of changes in personnel, the club completed a relatively successful year with a nailbiting defeat to St Ives Roosters in the semi-final of the RLC Shield 34–32 at Hemel Hempstead after finishing fourth of five in the South West Division.

2006 saw Plymouth finish third in the South West and West Midlands division before losing narrowly to Burntwood Barbarians in the play-offs.

=== Plymouth Titans ===
For 2007, a new South West Division of the Rugby League Conference was created with new clubs in East Devon Eagles (Exmouth), Devon Sharks (Newton Abbot) and Exeter Centurions joining Plymouth (who added the suffix "Titans") and Somerset Vikings "A".

The season started with the South West Nines at Taunton which the Titans won – beating the East Devon Eagles 8–6 in the final. The club was forced to leave their home ground of Stonehouse Creek after playing their opening two games due to proposed re-surfacing of the pitches and transferred to King George V Playing Fields at Elburton for the remainder of the season.

2007 was Plymouth's most successful yet with nine wins out of ten in the league, a 96–0 win in the South West Grand Final against Devon Sharks and only narrowly losing to Bedford Tigers in the RLC semi-final at Bristol. The Titans suffered just three defeats, the semi-final reverse to Bedford and two defeats at the hands of the East Devon Eagles who won a Friday night thriller at the KGV 37–36 and 40–34 in the Devon Cup Final at Exmouth. In addition, a second team – the Stonehouse Stallions – was formed and played in the Devon Cup, losing all four games.

In 2008, the Titans gained revenge for their previous final loss beating Eagles 31–20 in the Devon Cup Final. In 2008, Plymouth Titans beat Devon Sharks 42–22 at Plymouth Albion’s Brickfields home. Plymouth Titans failed to complete the 2009 season in the South West division.

Plymouth Titans folded in 2016

== Club honours ==
- RLC South West Division: 2007
- South West Cup: 2011
- South West 9s: 2007, 2013

== See also ==
- List of sports clubs inspired by others
