= Exeter Centurions =

English amateur rugby league club

Club information
- Full name: Exeter Centurions RLFC
- Colours: Red with black and white V, gold trim
- Founded: 2007; 19 years ago
- Website: www.pitchero.com/clubs/exetercenturionsrlfc

Current details
- Ground: Flowerpots Field, Exwick, Exeter
- Coach: Joe Catcheside
- Captain: Stef Richards
- Competition: South West Rugby League

Records
- South West Cup (Rugby League): 1 (2012)

Exeter Centurions are a rugby league team based in Exeter, Devon. They play in the South West Rugby League.

== History ==
Exeter Centurions were formed by Basingstoke Beasts founder Joe Catcheside.

They joined the newly formed South West Division of the Rugby League Conference in 2007. In their first two seasons, Exeter only won one match. Exeter co-hosted the 2009 South West Nines competition and reached the final before losing to Exeter University at Duckes Meadow. In the regular season, the club's performance improved significantly, finishing in third in the league and reaching the SW Cup Final, which they lost against East Devon Eagles at Plymouth Albion's Brickfields ground.

The club continued to improve in 2010, opening with a record 5 game winning sequence before falling to a last gasp defeat in the cup quarter- final against Devon Sharks in Torquay. The club lost only two league fixtures, but again missed out on the Grand Final after a narrow defeat to the Eagles. Centurions went on to represent the South West Conference in the National competition, losing a close game against Neath Port Talbot Steelers. Once again, Centurions lost the South West Nines final to the Exeter University team. 2011 proved a disappointing season, after the loss of influential players Brent Ryan and Alex Stevens. The club suffered several narrow defeats, including an extra-time loss in the cup semi-final against Plymouth Titans, and finished only sixth in the league, is worst performance for three years.

In 2012, the club is underwent a relaunch. It secured the rights to wear the city crest of Exeter on its shirts, and branding itself 'The Pride of the City'. Despite a rather erratic league record, the club enjoyed its greatest triumph to date in the South West Cup. After an unexpected victory in the semi-final against 2011 League Champions, Somerset Vikings, the club went on to win the South West Rugby League Cup Final, beating North Devon Raiders 34-14 at Launceston, on 22 July 2012. Dave Bargent scored three tries, with Alex Stevens, returning with dispensation from his professional contract at Featherstone Rovers. adding two, and taking the Man of the Match Award. Influential stand-off Alex Ford scored the other try, with Adam Willows kicking five goals. Captain Matt Coldrey - with Stevens, and Nathan Clark (formerly Nathan Hardy), were winners who debuted for the club in their first run-out, at the 2007 South West Nines five years earlier. Also in that original team was Cup Final Referee, Chris Symons.

Exeter Centurions South West Cup 2012 Final Team
| First team squad | | Coaching staff |
|---|---|---|
| 1 Rich Hart – FB; 2 Dan Mountstevens – WG; 3 Adam Willows – CE, SO; 4 Nathan Clark – CE, SR; 5 Andrew Turner – WG; 6 Alex Ford – SO; 7 Matt Coldrey (c) – HB; 15 Wayne Broomfield – PR; 9 Alex Stevens – HK; 10 Charlie Hinton – PR; 11 Ollie Chanin – SR, LF; 12 Dave Bargent – SR; 13 Dave Walter – LF, SR | 14 Andrew Alderman – WG; 8 Dom Cant – PR; 16 Joe Brooks – CE; 17 Mark Toms – WG | Head coach: Joe Catcheside; Legend: (c) Captain(s); (vc) Vice-captain(s) |
