= South West Rugby League =

English rugby league competition

- Founded: 2003
- Country: England
- Level on pyramid: 7
- Promotion to: None
- Relegation to: None
- Current champions: Devon Sharks
- Website: https://www.rugby-league.com/competitions/community-leagues/south-west-league

The South West Rugby League was a summer rugby league competition for amateur teams in South West England. The competition was formed in 2003 as the RLC South West Regional. Its name changed following the 2012 restructure of amateur rugby league in Great Britain.

The league has not played since its last documented season in 2023.

== History ==
The Rugby League Conference was founded in 1997 as the Southern Conference, a 10-team pilot league for teams in the South of England and the English Midlands.

The conference made the leap from 30 to 52 teams in 2003 and a South West Division appeared for the first time. It disappeared in 2004 as South West teams took part in the Western Division and Cardiff Demons joined the newly created Welsh Division.

The Premier divisions saw a change in boundaries leaving the North Premier division covering a larger area to give the English Midlands clubs their own premier division without having to face heartland teams, this left the West Midlands division with too few teams to run, resulting in a merged West Midlands and South West Division.

After a campaign by the RFL to form new clubs in the South West, a new South West division was created in 2007 for teams from the West Country. By 2010, there were enough teams to have a South West conference split into two pools.

For the 2011 season, there was a new RLC West of England alongside the RLC South West. The initial idea was that the two leagues would compete side by side with play-offs at the end of the season to decide an overall South West champion. In 2011, Gloucestershire Warriors defeated Somerset Vikings in the Championship play-off. In 2012, the intended play-off match was cancelled as the majority of the Devon Sharks team, the South West Champions, were unable to break off from the start of the rugby union season to fulfil the fixture.

The South Western Rugby League was formed in February 2013 to organise and administer the South West Men's League following the switch of the majority of community clubs in England to a summer season and the ending of the Rugby League Conference in 2011.

The league has consequently not been competed for since its last season in 2023, where the league was won by Devon Sharks.

== Position in Pyramid ==
- 1: Betfred Super League
- 2: Betfred Championship
- 3: Betfred League One
- 4: National Conference Premier Division
- 5: National Conference League One
- 6: National Conference League Two
- 7: National Conference League Three

== Participating teams by season ==
=== South West League ===
- 2003: Bristol Sonics, Cardiff Demons, Gloucestershire Warriors, Oxford Cavaliers, Somerset Vikings, Worcestershire Saints
- 2005: Bristol Sonics, Gloucestershire Warriors, Oxford Cavaliers, Plymouth, Somerset Vikings, Thames Valley
- 2007: Devon Sharks, East Devon Eagles, Exeter Centurions, Plymouth Titans, Somerset Vikings 'A'
- 2008: Devon Sharks, East Devon Eagles, Exeter Centurions, Plymouth Titans, Somerset Vikings
- 2009: Devon Sharks, East Devon Eagles, Exeter Centurions, Plymouth Titans, Somerset Vikings, South Dorset Giants
- 2010: Devon Sharks, East Devon Eagles, Exeter Centurions, North Devon Raiders, Plymouth Titans, Somerset Vikings, South Dorset Giants, South Somerset Warriors
- 2011: Devon Sharks, East Devon Eagles, Exeter Centurions, North Devon Raiders, Plymouth Titans, Somerset Vikings, South Dorset Giants, (South Somerset Warriors withdrew mid-season)
- 2012: Devon Sharks, Exeter Centurions, Exmouth Saints (replacements for East Devon Eagles; failed to complete the season), North Devon Raiders, Plymouth Titans
- 2013: Cornish Rebels, Devon Sharks, Exeter Centurions, North Devon Raiders, Plymouth Titans, Somerset Vikings A
- 2014: Cornish Rebels, Devon Sharks, Exeter Centurions, North Devon Raiders, Plymouth Titans
- 2015: Cornish Rebels, Devon Sharks, Exeter Centurions, North Devon Raiders, Plymouth Titans
- 2018: Cornish Rebels, Dorset County Giants, Saltash Essayons, Tarka Storm, Teignbridge Trojans (league was known as South West Premier in the West of England Leagues)
- 2019: Devon Sharks, Dorset County Giants, Saltash Essayons, Tarka Storm, Teignbridge Trojans
- 2021: Cornish Rebels, Cornwall, Devon, Exeter Ravens RL, Saltash Essayons, Tarka Storm, Teignbridge Trojans
- 2022: Exeter Ravens RL, Royal Navy Development XIII, Saltash Essayons, Tarka Storm, Teignbridge Trojans#
- 2023: Devon Sharks, Exeter Ravens RL, Tarka Storm, Teignbridge Trojans

== Winners ==
=== South West League ===
- 2003: Cardiff Demons
- 2005: Gloucestershire Warriors
- 2007: Plymouth Titans
- 2008: East Devon Eagles
- 2009: Devon Sharks
- 2010: East Devon Eagles
- 2011: Somerset Vikings
- 2012: Devon Sharks
- 2013: Devon Sharks
- 2014: Cornish Rebels
- 2018: Cornish Rebels
- 2019: Devon Sharks
- 2021: Tarka Storm
- 2022: Tarka Storm
- 2023: Devon Sharks

=== South West Cup ===
The South West cup is a knock-out competition played for by members of the South West Division. It was originally known as the Devon Cup.

- 2006: East Devon Eagles (as Devon Cup)
- 2007: East Devon Eagles (as Devon Cup)
- 2008: Plymouth Titans (as Devon Cup)
- 2009: East Devon Eagles
- 2010: Devon Sharks
- 2011: Plymouth Titans
- 2012: Exeter Centurions
- 2013: Cornish Rebels
- 2014: Cornish Rebels
- 2015: Exeter Centurions

=== South West Nines ===
The South West Nines is a rugby league nines competition. It is competed for by RLC South West and RLC West of England teams and local student rugby league sides.

- 2007: Plymouth Titans
- 2008: Exeter University
- 2009: Exeter University
- 2010: Exeter University
- 2011: Exeter University
- 2012: Plymouth Titans
- 2013: Exeter University
- 2014: Cornish Rebels
- 2015: Cornish Rebels

=== County Challenge ===
In 2010, an intended one–off County of Origin style match was played between Devon and Cornwall with Devon winning 44–20. The match was featured on the BBC national news and was widely covered by the rugby league press. It has since been competed for on several occasions as the Martin Roddy MBE Trophy. Winners are:

- 2010: Devon
- 2011: Devon
- 2012: Cornwall
- 2013: Cornwall
- 2015: Devon

=== South West County Championship Festival ===
The first South West County Championship took place on the May Bank Holiday weekend in 2011 at Aretians RFC in Bristol. The 2012 Event took place at Bridgwater RFC in Somerset. Winners are:

- 2011: Hampshire
- 2012: Hampshire
