= The Brickfields =

Stadium in Devonport, England

Coordinates: 50°22′16″N 4°10′14″W

Brickfields Recreation Ground
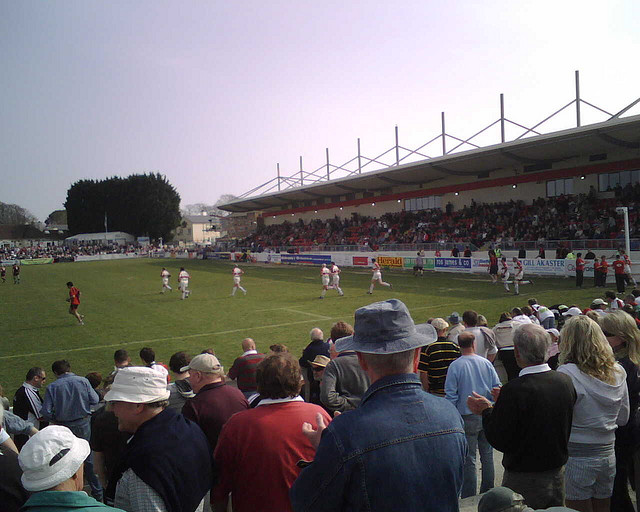
- Interactive map of Brickfields Recreation Ground
- Location: Devonport, Devon
- Capacity: 8,500

Construction
- Opened: 1915

Tenant
- Plymouth Albion (2003- )

Brickfields Recreation Ground is a sports stadium and multi-sport complex in Devonport, Plymouth, England. It is run by EveryoneActive on behalf of Plymouth City Council, and is the home ground of Rugby Union team Plymouth Albion of the National League 1, who moved there in 2003, after leaving their old ground at Beacon Park. The highest crowd was 6,871, for a match against local rivals Exeter Chiefs in October 2008.

Following Albion's relegation to the National League 1 in 2015, the North stand of the rugby stadium which read "PARFC" in white seats, was demolished, and attendances dropped down to roughly 1,000 per match. although attendances have risen to almost 3,000 in occasional games. Albion have two marquee tents next to the East and South stands that they hire out as a venue for receptions.

== Facilities ==
Since 1915, the site has been a recreation ground, primarily used for rugby union. The site is home to a gym complex, which is built into the back of the West stand.

Other facilities on the site include:

- An artificial turf football/hockey pitch
- Three grass football pitches
- One grass rugby pitch
- Athletics facilities
- Pétanque facilities
- A generic sports hall
- An exercise studio

== Redevelopment ==
In March 2023, it was announced that a consortium of Plymouth-based stakeholders would come together to fund a £21 million redevelopment of Brickfields to see the entire site redeveloped and provide a range of new community and sports facilities. This will include new grass and all-weather 3G pitches, new buildings to house classrooms, and improved parking facilities. The redeveloped facility will also provide a new permanent home for Plymouth Argyle F.C.'s senior women's team. The group overseeing the project includes Plymouth Argyle F.C., the Argyle Community Trust, Plymouth Albion RFC, Plymouth City Council and Devonport Community Leisure Ltd.

On 21 November 2024, it was announced that Brickfields would be renamed as Foulston Park following the completion of the redevelopment. The new name is intended to honour the Plymouth-born architect John Foulston who played a prominent role in developing the city in the 1800s.
