= Devon Sharks =

English amateur rugby league club

Club information
- Full name: Devon Sharks RLFC
- Colours: Royal Blue shirts, White shorts and Royal Blue Socks
- Founded: 3 May 2006; 20 years ago
- Website: www.devonsharksrl.co.uk

Current details
- Ground: Bullands Field, Bovey Tracey
- Competition: South West Rugby League

Devon Sharks are a rugby league team based in Bovey Tracey, Devon. The club were officially founded on Wednesday 3 May 2006 by Steve Hart, Darren West, Lee Kirkman and Christine Fairchild.

== History ==
Devon Sharks were formed in 2006 out of Newton Abbot RFC as part of an initiative from the Rugby Football League to form new clubs for the Rugby League Conference. They were based at the All Whites Rackerhayes home. That first year for Sharks was difficult as they only ever had eleven players to call upon. Their first game was against East Devon Eagles which they lost 68-0.

In 2007 Sharks joined the newly formed South West Division of the Rugby League Conference and it took a last-ditch appeal in the local press to ensure they had enough players to meet the Somerset Vikings in the season opener. The season went on to be reasonably successful for the Sharks, finishing level on points with East Devon Eagles. Sharks lost to Plymouth Titans in the final.

Big changes happened in 2008 as the Sharks severed all ties with Newton Abbot RFC and moved across South Devon to Easterfield Lane, Torquay into the first purpose rugby league pitch in the South West. Despite forming in Newton Abbot, the majority of the players all came from Torbay. Results were not what was expected and the Sharks missed out on the play-offs. Devon Sharks were involved in a game that was played on the biggest stage rugby league had ever been played on in the South West, when they travelled to take on Plymouth Titans at Plymouth Albion’s Brickfields home. After dominating the first hour, Sharks ran out of steam and conceded a number of tries in the final twenty minutes of the game, going down 42-22.

In 2009, Devon Sharks were champions of the RLC South West and went on to meet Northampton Casuals at the Stoop in the national semi-finals.

In 2010, Devon Sharks won the South West Cup beating Somerset Vikings 54-6 in the final held at Tiverton Rugby Club. Just 10 days later again in Tiverton, Sharks lost the RLC South West Grand Final to East Devon Eagles 37-32. In 2010, they notched their largest defeat inflicted on an opponent by trouncing North Devon Raiders 104 – 24.

In 2011 Devon Sharks made the play-offs

In 2012 Devon Sharks were Champions of the RLC South West beating North Devon Raiders.

In 2013 Devon Sharks entered into a partnership with Prostate Cancer UK and went on to become Champions of the South West for the third time. Sharks also lost in very closely fought game against the Cornish Rebels in the SW Cup. Reached the Harry Jepson Trophy Semi-Final before losing 44-22 to the South West London Chargers.

In 2015 Devon Sharks finished third in the table and crashed out of the SWRL play off system at the semi-final stage.

In 2016 Devon Sharks finished second, and played Cornish Rebels in the Grand Final, finishing runners up. Earlier in the season, both played the SW Cup Final, only for Sharks to be beaten by 2 points.

In 2017 Devon Sharks pulled out of the SWRL to concentrate on appeasing sponsors and to rebuild the club. Three years of missed fixtures and the requirement to play at neutral venues in the 2017 season was not conducive to the clubs growth. Sharks played friendlies against clubs from across the country against higher level opposition. Won the SWRL 9s at Teignbridge Trojans.

in 2019 Devon Sharks returned to the SWRL stronger and more experienced after two years of playing higher quality opposition. The club won its fourth title after beating Tarka Storm 38-10 in the Grand Final down in Launceston. The club then went on to beat Somerset Vikings 56-24 in the Harry Jepson Quarter Final to reach a third semi final at national level.

In 2020 Devon Sharks applied for and were accepted into the Southern Conference the top level of amateur rugby league in the South.

== Club honours ==
- Promoted to Southern Conference: 2020
- RLC South West / South West Rugby League Champions: 2009, 2012, 2013, 2019
- RLC South West Runners up: 2007, 2010, 2016
- South West Cup Winners: 2010
- South West Cup Runners Up: 2013, 2016
- South West 9s Winners 2017
- Tamarside Trophy Winners: 2007, 2008
- Devon Cup Runners up: 2006
- Tamar Shield Winners: 2019
