= Somerset Vikings =

English amateur rugby league club, based in Weston-super-Mare, Somerset

Somerset Vikings RLFC

Club information
- Full name: Somerset Vikings RLFC
- Colours: White, burgundy and black
- Founded: 2003; 23 years ago

Current details
- Ground: Hornets RFC, Hutton Moor Road, Weston-super-Mare BS22 8LY
- Competition: West of England Rugby League

Somerset Vikings RLFC are a rugby league team from the county of Somerset in England. They play in the West of England Rugby League.

The team play at Hornets RFC Weston-super-Mare. On a full artificial pitch. In 2004/5 the Vikings became a club subject to a formal constitution and is now run by a committee of five officials elected at the annual general meeting in September assisted by two ex officio members.

The club has never finished lower than 3rd in the league and were winners in 2004. The club have a number of sponsors made up of businesses in the Somerset area.

== History ==
Somerset Vikings were formed at the beginning of 2003 and joined the Rugby League Conference that same year. Head coach, Chris Richards, and commercial manager, Darren Horne, manage the side made up of Taunton and Exeter based Royal Marines and a number of local rugby union players. The club were then, the most south-westerly rugby league club in England. The club's first base was Hyde Park, home of Taunton rugby union club.

Somerset Vikings were winners of the Western Division in 2004. In 2004/5, the Vikings became a club subject to a formal constitution. The Vikings finished the 2006 season in second place, losing to Gloucestershire Warriors in the South West and Midlands Grand Final.

Somerset were promoted to the Midlands Premier division for the 2007 season. The typical away match required a round trip of 300 miles; the team finished 4th out of 8. After a campaign by the RFL to form new clubs in the South West, a new South West Division emerged this year for teams from the West Country, Vikings' newly formed second team competed but did not make the play-offs.

In 2008, the club withdrew from the Midlands Premier and joined the South West division; the second team being disbanded. Somerset reached the Grand Final in this first season. In 2010, they made it to the final of the South West cup but lost out again. The next year, they finished top of the table and were awarded the South West Rugby League title following play-off defaults from East Devon Eagles and Devon Sharks.

For the 2012 season, the club played in the new West of England division of the South West Conference; they made it to the Grand Final but lost to Oxford Cavaliers. For the 2012 season, Vikings played at the home of Bridgwater & Albion.

== Club honours ==
- RLC Western Division: 2004
- RLC South West Division: 2011
