= Camborne RFC =

Rugby union club, based in Camborne, Cornwall

Camborne
- Full name: Camborne Rugby Football Club
- Union: Cornwall RFU
- Nickname(s): The Cherry & Whites
- Founded: 1878; 148 years ago
- Location: Camborne, Cornwall, UK
- Ground: Recreation Ground (Capacity: 7,000 (780 seated))
- Chairman: Martin Symons
- President: Terry Williams
- Coach(es): Tom Kessell (Head Coach), Josh Matavesi (defence coach), Kyle Moyle (attack coach), Chris Fuca (Forwards/scrum coach), Ben Priddey (Strength and Conditioning Coach)
- Top scorer: Ben Priddey (45 tries 2024 - 25 season)
- League: National League 2 West
- 2025–26: 1st (promoted to National League 1)
1st kit	2nd kit

Official website
- www.cambornerfc.co.uk

Camborne RFC was established in 1878, known locally by fans as 'Town', are one of the most famous rugby union clubs in Cornwall. Having won promotion from National League 2 West, a level four league in the English rugby union system, Camborne RFC currently play in National League 1.

When the rugby union leagues were introduced in 1987, Camborne was the highest placed Cornish team and played in Area 4 South. They are also one of the most successful club sides in Cornwall having won the Cornish Cup ten times as of 2016 – level with local rivals Redruth – following a record fourth title in a row in 2016. Camborne enjoys a strong a rivalry with neighbours Redruth, with the two clubs meeting each year, in what was once erroneously believed to be the world's longest enduring rugby fixture.

== History ==
Many original players were involved in the local tin mining industry especially at Camborne's Dolcoath mine which at that time was the deepest mine in Britain, and many were employed at the local machine tool manufacturer at Holman Brothers producing mining equipment. The first Camborne RFC game was played against Penzance in front of some 600 spectators in November 1877. At the start of the 1880–81 season the ground was a field near Camborne Consols (described as an ″old mine″), adjoining Holman Brothers' stone yard.

In 1909–10 Camborne was the top Cornish team and in the following season no Cornish side managed to score a try against "Town" as they were then known. When the tin mining recession hit Cornwall in the late 19th-century many Camborne men and their successors were forced to emigrate to places such as South Africa, Australia and North and South America and along with their mining skills they also helped establish the game of rugby in these areas.

After the First World War in the early 1920s, rugby established a huge following in Camborne. Teams would change at a local hotel and march to the ground behind the Town band. In 1924 a crowd of 19,000 people gathered at Camborne to watch Cornwall, with no less than seven Camborne players, take on the New Zealand All Blacks, and matches against local rivals, Redruth, invariably pulled in crowds of around 6,000. Captain Crawshays Welsh Touring XV started to include Camborne on their fixture list in 1923. Crawshays teams were chosen from the leading clubs in Wales, and consisted of seasoned internationals and up and coming players who would usually go on to be internationals. In 1926–27, Camborne, also known as the Cherry and Whites were the top club in Cornwall and had their first win over a Crawshay side.

With the end of the Second World War the club was back in business and John Collins made his debut for the reserves team in 1946–47 and was selected to play at full back for England in 1952. The 1950s and 60's saw many more successful teams, and Camborne became the first Cornish side in 1968 to beat Ebbw Vale in eighteen Cornish tours.

The team became the most consistent and successful side in Cornwall in the 1970s, winning the Cornish league and cup in 1977–78, the league for the next four years running until 1982, again league champions 84–85 and 85–86, were the highest placed Cornish national league club 87–88 and 88–89, and achieved further Cornwall Cup wins in 1985, 1987, 1990 and 1992. Giant lock Andy Reed joined the Cherry and Whites in 1987, who was later to play for the all-conquering Bath Rugby team of the nineties and represent Scotland and the British and Irish Lions. In 1989 Cornwall reached the final of the County Championship at Twickenham against Durham and were represented by nine Camborne players out of the twenty-one man squad.

More recently youth development products Josh Matavesi and younger brother Sam have gone on to represent Fiji at International level. They are the sons of Camborne and Cornwall legend Serelli Matavesi.

== Recreation Ground ==
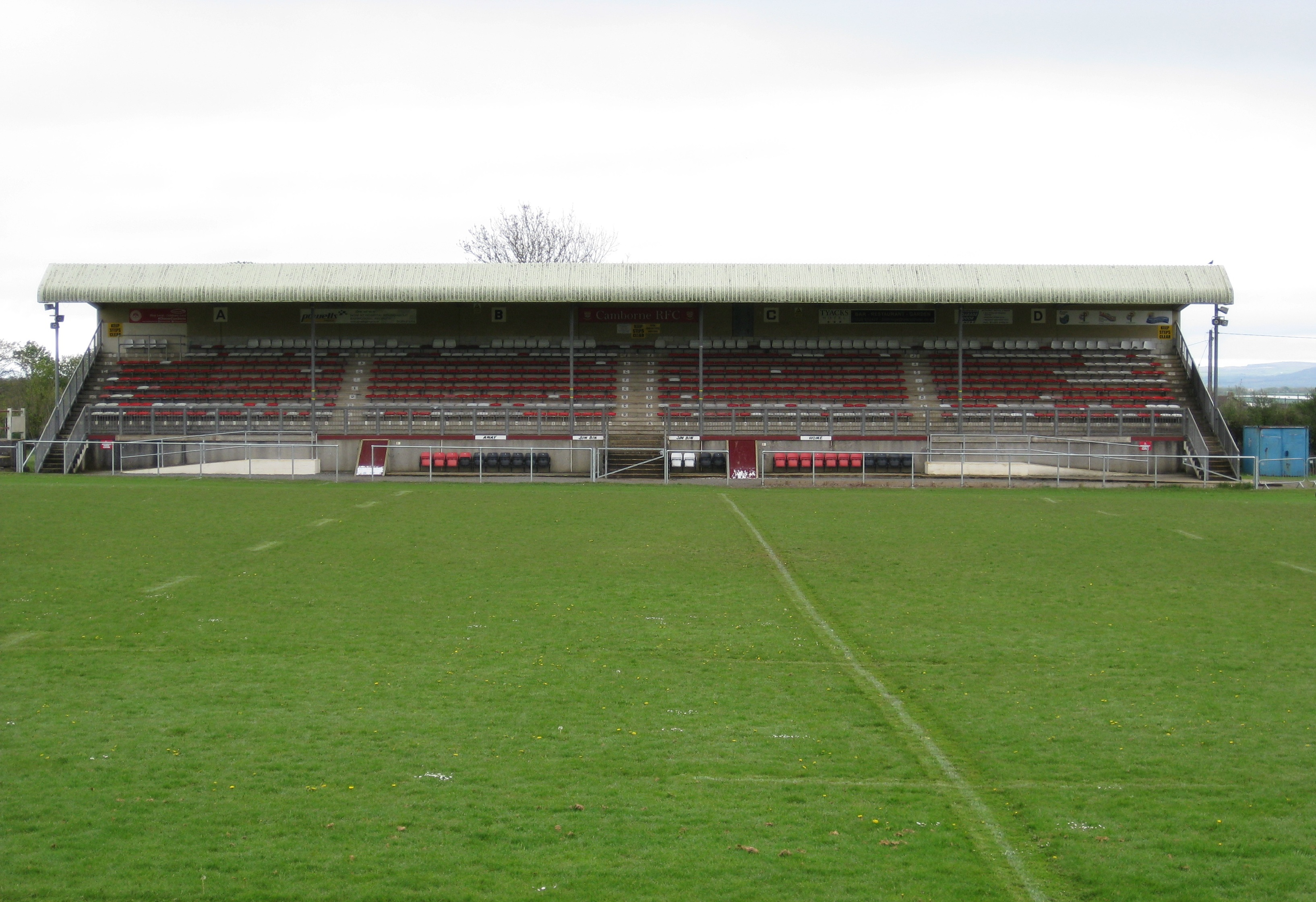
View of the grandstand at the Recreation Ground, home of Camborne RFC

Camborne is one of the grounds used by the Cornish rugby team and has hosted many notable international sides including the New Zealand All Blacks in 1905, 1924 and 1953, Australia in 1908, 1947 and 1967, South Africa 1960, United States 1977 and numerous other touring sides such as the South African Barbarians and Canterbury (NZ).

In 2006 it was agreed to ground share the Recreation Ground with RFU Championship team the Cornish Pirates and the ground underwent a major refurbishment including a new stand for the 2007–08 season. This arrangement has now ceased and the Pirates returned to play at the Mennaye, Penzance in 2010. The first stand was built in 1901 with a £400 loan from the local order of Oddfellows.

The capacity of the Recreation Ground has varied over the decades. Up until the 1980s it was one of the largest rugby grounds in England with an official capacity of 18,582, while a 1990 ground capacity estimate was down to 11,000 (all standing).

The current capacity (2018) is much reduced on this due to much tighter safety measures, being approximately 7,000, which includes 780 seated in the grandstand. The Cornish Pirates came close to achieving a capacity crowd at the ground with a club-record attendance of 6,487 watching the Pirates play Northampton Saints on 9 September 2007.

== Current standings ==
2026–27 National League 1 table
Pos	Team	Pld	W	D	L	PF	PA	PD	TB	LB	Pts	Qualification
1	Plymouth Albion	5	5	0	0	292	57	+235	5	0	25	Promotion place
2	Tonbridge Juddians	5	5	0	0	216	203	+13	5	0	25	Promotion play-off
3	Sale FC	5	4	0	1	231	141	+90	4	1	21	Promotion play-off
4	Camborne	5	4	0	1	163	144	+19	4	0	20	
5	Bishop's Stortford	5	3	0	2	184	170	+14	4	0	16	
6	Birmingham Moseley	5	3	0	2	148	191	−43	4	0	16	
7	Leeds Tykes	5	2	0	3	179	121	+58	3	3	14	
8	Rosslyn Park	5	2	0	3	178	193	−15	4	1	13	
9	Dings Crusaders	5	1	1	3	203	199	+4	5	2	13	
10	Bury St Edmunds	5	2	0	3	158	218	−60	4	0	12	
11	Rams	5	1	1	3	129	177	−48	4	1	11	Relegation play-off
12	Sheffield	5	1	0	4	98	156	−58	3	2	9	Relegation place
13	London Scottish	5	1	0	4	141	211	−70	3	1	8	Relegation place
14	Cambridge	5	0	0	5	149	288	−139	4	3	7	Relegation place

Updated to match(es) played on 3 October 2026. Source: National League Rugby
Rules for classification: If teams are level at any stage, tiebreakers are applied in the following order:
1. Number of matches won
2. Number of matches drawn
3. Difference between points for and against
4. Total number of points for
5. Aggregate number of points scored in matches between tied teams
6. Number of matches won excluding the first match, then the second and so on until the tie is settled

== Honours ==
- Cornwall League/Merit Table champions (10): 1909–10, 1910–11, 1926–27, 1977–78, 1978–79, 1979–80, 1980–81, 1981–82, 1984–85, 1985–86
- Cornwall Cup winners (10): 1977–78, 1984–85, 1986–87, 1989–90, 1991–92, 2010–11, 2012–13, 2013–14, 2014–15, 2015–16
- Western Counties West champions (2): 2003–04, 2009–10
- Rodda's Cup winners (3): 2011, 2013, 2018 (Note: Note that the Rodda's Cup fixture between Camborne and Redruth is contested twice a season on a home and away basis, once on Boxing Day and then again in either March or April. Also note that the cup was first competed for on the Boxing Day of 2010.)
- Tribute South West 1 West champions: 2015–16
- Cornwall Super Cup winners: 2016–17
- Regional 1 South West champions 2022–23
- National League 2 West champions: 2025–26

== Notable former players ==
- (Wales) F S Jackson – 1908 British Lions tour to New Zealand and Australia
- (Cornwall) John Collins – 1952 England international
- Josh Matavesi – played junior rugby at the club, went on to play for a number of professional clubs including Racing 92, and has gained multiple international caps for Fiji as well as representing the Barbarians.
- Andy Reed – British and Irish Lion and Scotland international
- Sam Matavesi - Northampton Saints & Fiji international
- {{flagicon|fiji}} Joel Matavesi - Former Northampton Saints & Newcastle Red Bulls

== See also ==
- Cornish rugby
