= Jack Lavin =

English rugby union player

- Born: 13 January 1992 (age 34)
- Height: 6 ft 2 in (1.88 m)
- Weight: 203 lb (92 kg)
- School: Calday Grange
- University: Cardiff Metropolitan University

Rugby union career
- Position(s): Fly-half, Inside Centre
- Current team: Esher
Senior career
| Years | Team | Apps | (Points) |
| 2009–10 | Hoylake | | |
| 2010–11, 2015 | Birkenhead Park | 18 | (83) |
| 2011–14 | UWIC | | |
| 2014–15, 2015–17 | Caldy | 63 | (471) |
| 2017– | Esher | | |
- Correct as of 30 April 2019
International career
| Years | Team | Apps | (Points) |
| 2017 | England Counties XV | 2 | (12) |
- Correct as of 10 July 2017

Jack Lavin (born 1992) is an English rugby union player who is currently at Esher in National League 1 having signed from Caldy for the 2017–18 season. He plays at Fly-half or Inside Centre and is an excellent points kicker who can also score tries. As well as playing club rugby he has represented Cheshire in the county championships, finishing as runners up in 2016, as well as being capped by England Counties XV.

== Career ==
=== Early career ===
Growing up in the Wirral, Lavin attended Calday Grange Grammar School in the town of West Kirby. While still attending school he played men's senior rugby union with Hoylake, featuring prominently for the club during the 2009–10 season when they finished 10th in South Lancs/Cheshire 1 – a northern regional league. His performances for Hoylake saw him come to the attention of two higher ranked clubs in the area – Birkenhead Park and Caldy. After playing several pre-season games with Caldy during the summer of 2010 he decided to sign for Birkenhead Park instead as he felt he was more likely to get first team action as Park were one division below Caldy in National League 3 North.

Lavin started the 2010–11 season playing for Birkenhead Park's second team – the Wanderers. After impressing for the Wanderers he made his first team debut on 25 September 2010, scoring 10 points in a 20–11 victory away to Penrith. Several months later he scored his first try for his new club in a 27–24 victory away to Billingham in a league match. Lavin would go on to feature regularly for Birkenhead Park as they finished in 6th place in National League 3 North. While at Birkenhead Park he was also selected to play for the Cheshire under-20 county side.

In 2011 Lavin left Birkenhead Park and the Wirral to move to Cardiff where he was studying for a Bachelor of Science (Bsc), Sports and Exercise at Cardiff Metropolitan University. While at university he also played for the affiliated rugby club, UWIC, who played in the Welsh Championship (tier 2 of the Welsh domestic league). Lavin was also part of the Cardiff Met side that won the 2013 BUCS Championship, featuring in the starting line-up as his team defeated Hartpury College 27–13 in the final held at Twickenham Stadium in March. Several months later Lavin would be called up by the Cheshire senior county side to be part of the squad for the 2013 Bill Beaumont Cup – the first of two county championship he would take part in while still at university.

=== Caldy ===
In 2014 upon completing university at Cardiff Met Lavin returned to the Wirral and joined Caldy (who he had almost signed for back in 2010). He made his National League 2 North debut for Caldy on 6 September 2014 in what would be a 17–45 defeat away to Hull Ionians. His debut season with Caldy was slightly underwhelming and despite making 10 league appearances by the spring of 2015 Lavin had decided to leave the club and resign with former club, Birkenhead Park, who were playing several divisions below in North 1 West.

=== Second spell with Birkenhead Park ===
Having left half-way through the season Lavin joined a Birkenhead Park side chasing promotion in North 1 West, making his debut on 31 January 2015 in a 29–12 win away to Warrington in a game that saw him score a try in a man of the match performance. In his new surroundings he continued to show great form as Birkenhead Park, playing in every league game as they went on to claim the North 1 West title and promotion to National League 3 North. He capped a triumphant season by scoring a hat-trick of tries in the final league game, a 43–15 win at home to Kendal.

Despite playing in tier 6 of the English league system, Lavin was so impressive that he was once more called up by the Cheshire county side to take part in the 2015 Bill Beaumont Cup. While he had been a bit part player in previous championships, this time he was the main man in a Cheshire side looking to win the northern pool and qualify for the Twickenham final. Lavin had an excellent tournament, finishing as the competitions second highest points scorer with 31 points, as Cheshire finished second in their pool behind finalists Lancashire.

=== Back to Caldy ===
After a successful personal showing at the 2015 Bill Beaumont Cup with Cheshire, Lavin returned to Caldy for another crack at National League 2 North. He made his first appearance of the campaign on 5 September 2015, kicking 13 points in a 23–11 victory away to Sale. After this starring performance, Lavin would not look back and he went on to make 27 league appearances and contributed 83 points (including 8 tries) to a Caldy side that would finish 5th in the league. He also started the final of the Cheshire Cup in April 2016, as Caldy lost 26–49 to National League 2 champions, Macclesfield, at Bradwell Road in Sandbach.

At the end of the 2015–16 season Lavin would take part in his fourth county championships with Cheshire. He had another excellent tournament at the 2016 Bill Beaumont Cup helping his county to their first final in 14 years, and although they lost 13–35 to a very strong Cornwall side, Lavin proved to be one of the best players in the competition, with his personal tally of 49 points (including 3 tries) making him the top points scorer. The 2016–17 season was an outstanding one for Lavin who finished top scorer in National League 2 North with 378 points, including 23 tries, in a Caldy side that stormed to the league title and promotion to National League 1 – the highest level the club has ever reached. He was also called up for Cheshire for the 2017 Bill Beaumont Cup but experienced a disappointing championships as his county failed to reach the final after losing 2 of their 3 pool games. The final highlight of an excellent season was Lavin's call up to the England Counties XV for their tour of Spain. He started the first game of the tour, kicking 12 points as Counties convincingly beat Euskarians 61–19 in San Sebastián. He also featured in the second game against Spain in Guadalajara, which Counties won 45–28.

=== National League 1 with Esher ===
In July 2017, after two successful seasons with Caldy, Lavin signed for Esher, playing in National League 1. Unfortunately, Lavin suffered a serious (life-threatening) neck injury during pre-season training which ended his season before it began. After two seasons out he is expected to be back playing again at the start of the 2019–20 season.

== Season-by-season playing stats ==
1st 50/22 for Esher RFC vs Redruth 2021/22 season

=== Club ===
| Season | Club | Competition | Appearances | Tries | Drop Goals | Conversions | Penalties | Total Points |
|---|---|---|---|---|---|---|---|---|
| 2009–10 | Hoylake | South Lancs/Cheshire 1 | ? | ? | ? | ? | ? | ? |
| 2010–11 | Birkenhead Park | National League 3 North | 9 | 2 | 0 | 5 | 6 | 38 |
| 2011–12 | UWIC | Welsh Championship | ? | ? | ? | ? | ? | ? |
| 2012–13 | UWIC | Welsh Championship | ? | ? | ? | ? | ? | ? |
| 2013–14 | UWIC | Welsh Championship | ? | ? | ? | ? | ? | ? |
| 2014–15 | Caldy | National League 2 North | 10 | 2 | 0 | 0 | 0 | 10 |
| 2014–15 | Birkenhead Park | North 1 West | 9 | 9 | 0 | 0 | 0 | 45 |
| 2015–16 | Caldy | National League 2 North | 27 | 8 | 0 | 11 | 7 | 83 |
| 2016–17 | Caldy | National League 2 North | 26 | 23 | 1 | 85 | 30 | 378 |
| 2017–18 | Esher | National League 1 | 0 | 0 | 0 | 0 | 0 | 0 |
| 2018–19 | Esher | National League 1 | 0 | 0 | 0 | 0 | 0 | 0 |

=== County/Representative ===
| Season | Side | Competition | Appearances | Tries | Drop Goals | Conversions | Penalties | Total Points |
|---|---|---|---|---|---|---|---|---|
| 2012–13 (Note: Gavin was selected for the Cheshire squad to take part in the 2013 County Championships but only was on the substitutes bench for one of their pool games. Whether he made an appearance from the bench during this game is unclear.) | Cheshire | County Championship | 0 | 0 | 0 | 0 | 0 | 0 |
| 2013–14 | Cheshire | County Championship | 1 | 0 | 0 | 0 | 0 | 0 |
| 2014–15 | Cheshire | County Championship | 3 | 3 | 0 | 8 | 0 | 31 |
| 2015–16 | Cheshire | County Championship | 4 | 3 | 0 | 5 | 8 | 49 |
| 2016–17 | Cheshire | County Championship | 2 | 0 | 0 | 5 | 3 | 19 |
| 2016–17 | England Counties XV | Tour of Spain | 2 | 0 | 0 | 6 | 0 | 12 |

== Honours and records ==
Cardiff Metropolitan University

- BUCS Championship winners: 2013

Birkenhead Park

- North 1 West champions: 2014–15

Caldy

- National League 2 North champions: 2016–17
- National League 2 North top points scorer: 2016–17 (378 points)

Cheshire (Senior Side)

- Capped by Cheshire senior county side
- County Championship runners up: 2016
- County Championship top points scorer: 2016 (49 points)

Cheshire (under-20)

- Capped by Cheshire under-20 county side

England Counties XV

- Selected for tour of Spain: 2017
