= 2016 Bill Beaumont Cup =

2016 Bill Beaumont Cup (County Championship)
- Countries: England
- Date: 7 May 2016 - 29 May 2016
- Champions: Cornwall (5th title)
- Runners-up: Cheshire
- Relegated: Yorkshire, Surrey
- Matches played: 13
- Attendance: 13,563 (average 1,043 per match)
- Highest attendance: 3,125 Cornwall v Surrey (21 May 2016)
- Lowest attendance: 200 Surrey v Gloucestershire (4 May 2016)
- Top point scorer: (England) Jack Lavin; Cheshire 49
- Top try scorer: (England) Sam Baker; Gloucestershire 5

The 2016 Bill Beaumont Cup, also known as Bill Beaumont Cup Division One, was the 116th version of the annual, English rugby union, County Championship organized by the RFU for the top tier English counties. Each county drew its players from rugby union clubs from the third tier and below of the English rugby union league system (typically National League 1, National League 2 North or National League 2 South). The counties were divided into two regional pools with the winners of each meeting in the final held at Twickenham Stadium. New counties to the competition were the two finalists from the 2015 County Championship Plate – Surrey (winners) and Eastern Counties (runners-up) who replaced Kent and Durham who were relegated from their respective groups. Cornwall were the defending champions.

The two pool winners, Cheshire (north) and holders Cornwall met in the final. Cheshire had beaten 2015's runners up, Lancashire, in the pool stage, but came up short against a Cornish side managed once more by Graham Dawe who had lost his job at Plymouth Albion at the end of the season. The bulk of his team were Albion players, and they beat Cheshire, 35–13, to retain their title, with Matthew Shepherd having another good final by getting 20 of Cornwall's points including a last minute try. Due to changes to the County Championship format for the 2017 competition, no teams would be relegated to the second tier of the county championships for the following season.

== Competition format ==
The competition format is two regional group stages divided into north and south, with each team playing each other once. This means that two teams in the pool have two home games, while the other two had just one. The top side in each group goes through to the final held at Twickenham Stadium. Unlike previous seasons, due to changes to the following seasons championships there would be no relegation.

== Participating Counties and ground locations ==
Locations of the 2016 Bill Beaumont Cup county teams

County	Stadium(s)	Capacity	City/Area
Cheshire	Hare Lane; Heywood Road	2,000; 5,400	Chester, Cheshire; Sale, Greater Manchester
Cornwall	The Recreation Ground; Recreation Ground	3,500 (580 seats); 7,000 (780 seats)	Redruth, Cornwall; Camborne, Cornwall
Eastern Counties	University Football Ground	1,500	Cambridge, Cambridgeshire
Gloucestershire	Station Road	2,500 (400 seats)	Cribbs Causeway, Patchway, Bristol
Hertfordshire	Woollam Playing Fields; Silver Leys	1,000; 1,600	St Albans, Hertfordshire; Bishop's Stortford, Hertfordshire
Lancashire	Woodlands Memorial Ground; Park Lane	9,000; 3,000	Lytham St Annes, Lancashire; Whitefield, Greater Manchester
Surrey	Hazelwood	2,000	Sunbury-on-Thames, Surrey
Yorkshire	Silver Royd	4,500 (425 seats)	Scalby, North Yorkshire

== Group stage ==
=== Division 1 North ===
2016 Beaumont Cup Division 1 North Table
	County	Played	Won	Drawn	Lost	Points For	Points Against	Points Difference	Try Bonus	Losing Bonus	Points
1	Cheshire (Q)	3	3	0	0	85	29	56	2	0	14
2	Lancashire	3	2	0	1	87	64	23	2	0	10
3	Eastern Counties	3	1	0	2	66	98	-32	1	0	5
4	Yorkshire	3	0	0	3	67	114	-47	1	0	1
If teams are level at any stage, tiebreakers are applied in the following order: 1. Number of matches won 2. Difference between points for and against 3. Total number of points for 4. Aggregate number of points scored in matches between tied teams 5. Number of matches won excluding the first match, then the second and so on until the tie is settled
Green background means the county qualified for the final. Pink background means the county were demoted to Division 2 North of the County Championship Plate for the following season. Updated: 21 May 2016; Source: "County Championships". englandrugby.com.

==== Round 1 ====
7 May 2016
15:00

(BP) Cheshire	29 - 11	Eastern Counties
	Report

Hare Lane, Chester
Attendance: 300
Referee: Matthew Turvey

7 May 2016
15:00

Yorkshire	27 - 40	Lancashire (BP)
	Yorkshire; Lancashire

Silver Royd, Scalby
Attendance: 1,896
Referee: Ben Blain

==== Round 2 ====
14 May 2016
15:00

(BP) Cheshire	29 - 7	Yorkshire
	Report

Heywood Road, Sale
Attendance: 523
Referee: Claire Hodnett

14 May 2016
15:00

(BP) Lancashire	36 - 10	Eastern Counties
	Eastern Counties; Lancashire

Woodlands Memorial Ground, Lytham St Annes
Attendance: 719
Referee: Will Halford

==== Round 3 ====
21 May 2016
15:00

(BP) Eastern Counties	45 - 33	Yorkshire (BP)
	Report

University Football Ground, Cambridge
Attendance: 250
Referee: Callum Howard

21 May 2016
15:00

Lancashire	11 - 27	Cheshire

Park Lane, Whitefield
Attendance: 500
Referee: Jamie Leahy

=== Division 1 South ===
2016 Beaumont Cup Division 1 South Table
	County	Played	Won	Drawn	Lost	Points For	Points Against	Points Difference	Try Bonus	Losing Bonus	Points
1	Cornwall (Q)	3	3	0	0	88	56	32	2	0	14
2	Hertfordshire	3	2	0	1	69	56	13	1	0	9
3	Gloucestershire	3	1	0	2	70	78	-8	1	1	6
4	Surrey	3	0	0	3	64	101	-37	0	1	1
If teams are level at any stage, tiebreakers are applied in the following order: 1. Number of matches won 2. Difference between points for and against 3. Total number of points for 4. Aggregate number of points scored in matches between tied teams 5. Number of matches won excluding the first match, then the second and so on until the tie is settled
Green background means the county qualified for the final. Pink background means the county were en demoted to Division 2 South of the County Championship Plate for the following season. Updated: 21 May 2016; Source: "County Championships". englandrugby.com.

==== Round 1 ====
7 May 2016
15:00

Cornwall	33 - 27	Gloucestershire (BP)
	Report

The Recreation Ground, Redruth
Attendance: 1,850
Referee: Callum Howard

7 May 2016
15:00

(BP) Hertfordshire	31 - 28	Surrey (BP)
	Report

Woollam Playing Fields, St Albans
Attendance: 490
Referee: David Clarkson

==== Round 2 ====
14 May 2016
14:00

Surrey	22 - 38	Gloucestershire (BP)
	Report

Hazelwood, Sunbury-on-Thames
Attendance: 200
Referee: Robbie Bourke

14 May 2016
15:00

Hertfordshire	15 - 23	Cornwall
	Report

Silver Leys, Bishop's Stortford
Attendance: 360
Referee: Luis Caviglia

==== Round 3 ====
21 May 2016
14:15

Gloucestershire	5 - 23	Hertfordshire
	Report

Station Road, Clifton, Bristol
Attendance: 350
Referee: Neil Chivers

21 May 2016
15:00

(BP) Cornwall	32 - 14	Surrey
	Report

The Recreation Ground, Camborne
Attendance: 3,125
Referee: Veryan Boscawen

== Final ==
29 May 2016

Cornwall	35–13	Cheshire
Try: Searle, Matavesi, Stupple, Shepherd; Con: Shepherd (3); Pen: Shepherd (3)	Report	Try: Millea; Con: Lavin; Pen: Lavin (2)

Twickenham Stadium, London
Attendance: 3,000
Referee: Jamie Leahy

15	Matthew Shepherd	Plymouth Albion
14	Lewis Vinnicombe	Redruth
13	Jake Murphy	Plymouth Albion
12	Nielson Webber	Redruth
11	Robin Wedlake	Plymouth Albion
10	Billy Searle	Plymouth Albion
9	Greg Goodfellow	Chinnor
1	Tom Cowan-Dickie	Redruth
2	Rupert Freestone	Plymouth Albion
3	Craig Williams	Redruth
4	Ben Hilton	Cornish All Blacks
5	Tony Whittle	Camborne
6	Kyle Marriott (capt)	Redruth
7	Sam Matavesi	Plymouth Albion
8	Herbie Stupple	Plymouth Albion
Replacements:
16	Richard Brown	Redruth
17	Barrie-John Chapman	Redruth
18	Damien Cook	Camborne
19	Chris Fuca	Camborne
20	Jon Dawe	Redruth
22	Sam Parsons	Plymouth Albion
23	Peter Joyce	Redruth
24	Lewis Webb	Taunton

15	Charlie Venables	Macclesfield
14	Jack Leech	Sandbach
13	Craig Harvey	Wirral
12	Rhys Hayes	Chester
11	Ali Baker	Wirral
10	Jack Lavin	Caldy
9	Joe Murray	Wirral
1	Gavin Woods	Chester
2	Paul Millea	Macclesfield
3	Elliot Millar-Mills	Macclesfield
4	David Marwick (capt)	Macclesfield
5	Tom Sanders	Caldy
6	Nyle Davidson	Caldy
7	Harry Broadbent	Rosslyn Park
8	Ryan Parkinson	Macclesfield
Replacements:
16	Benjamin Jones	Caldy
17	Forbes Edward	Unattached
18	Nathan Rushton	Caldy
19	Timothy Oakes	Sandbach
20	Chris Roddy	Stourbridge
22	Nicholas Pearson	Sheffield Tigers
23	Mike Craven	Chester

== Total season attendances ==
- Does not include final at Twickenham which is a neutral venue and involves teams from all three county divisions on the same day

County	Home Games	Total	Average	Highest	Lowest	% Capacity
Cheshire	2	823	412	523	300	12%
Cornwall	2	4,975	2,488	3,125	1,850	49%
Eastern Counties	1	250	250	250	250	17%
Gloucestershire	1	350	350	350	350	14%
Hertfordshire	2	850	425	490	360	36%
Lancashire	2	1,219	610	719	500	12%
Surrey	1	200	200	200	200	10%
Yorkshire	1	1,896	1,896	1,896	1,896	42%

== Individual statistics ==
- Note if players are tied on tries or points the player with the lowest number of appearances will come first. Also note that points scorers includes tries as well as conversions, penalties and drop goals. Appearance figures also include coming on as substitutes (unused substitutes not included). Statistics will also include final.

=== Top points scorers ===
Rank	Player	County	Club Side	Appearances	Points
1	(England) Jack Lavin	Cheshire	Caldy	4	49
2	(England) Matthew Shepherd	Cornwall	Plymouth Albion	4	48
3	(England) Chris Johnson	Lancashire	Fylde	3	32
4	(England) Greg Lound	Yorkshire	Hull Ionians	3	27
5	(England) Simon Horbeck	Eastern Counties	Shelford	3	26

=== Top try scorers ===
Rank	Player	County	Club Side	Appearances	Tries
1	(England) Sam Baker	Gloucestershire	Cinderford	3	5
2	(Fiji) Sam Matavesi	Cornwall	Plymouth Albion	4	5
3	(England) Billy Searle	Cornwall	Plymouth Albion	3	4
4	(England) Jack Lavin	Cheshire	Caldy	4	3
5	(England) Matthew Noble	Surrey	Dorking	2	2

== See also ==
- English rugby union system
- Rugby union in England
