= Cowan-Dickie =

Cowan-Dickie is a Compound surname. Notable people with the surname include:

- Luke Cowan-Dickie (born 1993), English rugby union player
- Tom Cowan-Dickie (born 1991), English rugby union player, brother of Luke
