= 2016–17 National League 2 North =

Rugby union competition in England

- Countries: England
- Date: September 2016 – May 2017
- Champions: Caldy (1st title)
- Runners-up: Sale
- Relegated: Preston Grasshoppers, Scunthorpe, Harrogate
- Matches played: 240
- Attendance: 78,160 (average 326 per match)
- Highest attendance: 1,432; Caldy v Sale (8 April 2017)
- Lowest attendance: 50; South Leicester v Caldy (22 October 2016)
- Top point scorer: (England) Jack Lavin (Caldy) 378
- Top try scorer: (England) Nick Royle (Caldy) 32

The 2016–17 National League 2 North is the eighth season (30th overall) of the fourth tier (north) of the English domestic rugby union competitions since the professionalised format of the second division was introduced. New teams to the division include Wharfedale who were relegated from National League 1 while Sheffield Tigers were promoted as champions of National League 3 North along with Scunthorpe (champions) and Hinckley (play-off) from National League 3 Midlands.

Caldy were crowned champions on the 8 April 2017 with two games to go, after beating second place Sale 28–26 in front of a crowd of 1,432 at Paton Field (the biggest in the league that season) to make sure that the Heywood Road side could not catch them. It was the first time Caldy had won National League 2 North and the highest level they have reached in the club's history. Up until the last few games, Sale had been neck and neck with Caldy but in the end two defeats to the Wirral-based club meant that they finished 9 points adrift in second place. However, a strong finish by Sale meant that they would go into the promotion play-off against the runner-up from the 2016–17 National League 2 South, Old Elthamians, with home advantage as they gained more league points (124) than the southern based side (122). Despite home advantage Sale were unable to join Caldy in the 2017–18 National League 1 as they lost a close game 14–19 to Old Elthamians in front of a crowd of 1,297 at Heywood Road.

The liquidation of London Welsh in January 2017, and their expulsion from the RFU Championship, meant that there were only five teams relegated from National League 2 South and National League 2 North this season – meaning that one league would have three teams going down and the other having just two depending on league points at the end of the season. On the same day that Caldy won the league title, Preston Grasshoppers were the first team to be relegated, losing 32–48 to relegation rivals Harrogate and ending the club's 12-year stay in the division.

The battle for the other relegation places was much closer as on the last day of the season three sides could still go down. In the end it was Harrogate and newly promoted Scunthorpe who were relegated as both teams lost their matches, while another newly promoted side, Sheffield Tigers, won theirs. With regards to the Tigers, who at one point looked likely to go down, they had an absolute fantastic finish to the season, winning four out of five games to remain in National League 2 North. There had been some hope that the 14th placed team might have been kept safe but the equivalent side in the 2016–17 National League 2 South, Barnstaple, escaped relegation as they gained more points (51) than their northern counterparts (47). Following their relegation, Preston Grasshoppers and Harrogate will start next season in National League 3 North, while Scunthorpe will drop back down to National League 3 Midlands.

There were other points to contemplate at the end of the campaign. Attendances in National League 2 North were very good this season - up to 78,160 (or 326 per game) from 65,338 (273 per game) the previous year - which was the best support since the 2013-14 campaign when sides such as Darlington Mowden Park were taking part. This was mostly due to the consistent support which went to watch Wharfedale, Tynedale and Hinckley (two of whom were new to the division), along with several good individual attendances at both Caldy and Sale who benefited from being involved in a tightly contested title battle. A second point of note went to Nick Royle of Caldy who had another record breaking campaign. Firstly, his 32 tries equaled a season best for the division (Gareth Collins and Royle himself had previously achieved this), and secondly he finished as the top try scorer in the division for the third time in his career - a National League 2 North record. Finally, another record was equaled in the division by Wharfedale's Tom Barrett, who scored 3 drop kicks in a game - twice during the season.

== Structure ==
The league consists of sixteen teams with all the teams playing each other on a home and away basis to make a total of thirty matches each. There is one automatic promotion place, one play-off place and three relegation places. The champions are promoted to the 2017–18 National League 1 and the runner-up play the second-placed team in the 2016–17 National League 2 South with the winner also being promoted. The last three teams are relegated to either National League 3 North or National League 3 Midlands depending on the geographical location of the team (in some cases teams may join the southern regional leagues).

The results of the matches contribute points to the league as follows:

- 4 points are awarded for a win
- 2 points are awarded for a draw
- 0 points are awarded for a loss, however
- 1 losing (bonus) point is awarded to a team that loses a match by 7 points or fewer
- 1 additional (bonus) point is awarded to a team scoring 4 tries or more in a match.

== Participating teams and locations ==
Eleven of the teams listed below participated in the 2015–16 National League 2 North season; Wharfedale were relegated from the 2015–16 National League 1 while Sheffield Tigers were promoted as champions of National League 3 North and Scunthorpe (champions) and Hinckley came up from National League 3 Midlands.

Locations of the 2016–17 National League 2 North teams

Team	Ground	Capacity	City/Area	Previous season
Caldy	Paton Field	4,000	Thurstaston, Wirral, Merseyside	5th
Chester	Hare Lane	2,000 (500 seats)	Chester, Cheshire	11th
Harrogate	Rudding Lane	2,000	Harrogate, North Yorkshire	7th
Hinckley	Leicester Road	2,000	Hinckley, Leicestershire	Promoted from National League 3 Midlands (play-off winner)
Leicester Lions	Westleigh Park	2,000	Blaby, Leicestershire	3rd
Luctonians	Mortimer Park	2,500 (300 seats)	Kingsland, Herefordshire	6th
Otley	Cross Green	7,000 (852 seats)	Otley, Leeds, West Yorkshire	8th
Preston Grasshoppers	Lightfoot Green	2,250 (250 seats)	Preston, Lancashire	9th
Sale	Heywood Road	3,387 (Note: Sale's ground capacity was reduced from 5,400 to 3,387 in September 2016 on the recommendation of Trafford Council to improve spectator safety.)	Sale, Greater Manchester	13th
Scunthorpe	Heslam Park	1,212 (212 seats)	Scunthorpe, Lincolnshire	Promoted from National League 3 Midlands (champions)
Sedgley Park	Park Lane	3,000	Whitefield, Bury, Greater Manchester	2nd (lost play-off)
Sheffield Tigers	Dore Moor	1,000	Sheffield, South Yorkshire	Promoted from National League 3 North (champions)
South Leicester	Welford Road Ground		Leicester, Leicestershire	12th
Stourbridge	Stourton Park	3,500 (499 seats)	Stourbridge, West Midlands	4th
Tynedale	Tynedale Park	2,000 (400 seats)	Corbridge, Northumberland	10th
Wharfedale	The Avenue	2,000	Threshfield, North Yorkshire	Relegated from National League 1 (14th)

== League table ==
2016–17 National League 2 North table
Pos	Team	Pld	W	D	L	PF	PA	PD	TB	LB	Pts	Qualification
1	Caldy (C, P)	30	27	1	2	1060	454	+606	21	2	133	Promoted
2	Sale	30	26	0	4	997	487	+510	18	2	124	Promotion play-off
3	Leicester Lions	30	21	0	9	778	576	+202	16	4	104	
4	Sedgley Park	30	19	3	8	884	635	+249	15	4	101	
5	Chester	30	17	1	12	662	550	+112	16	7	93	
6	Tynedale	30	17	1	12	741	750	−9	15	4	89	
7	South Leicester	30	15	2	13	762	703	+59	12	8	84	
8	Stourbridge	30	16	0	14	679	685	−6	12	7	83	
9	Hinckley	30	14	0	16	630	712	−82	12	5	73	
10	Wharfedale	30	11	0	19	640	757	−117	8	9	61	
11	Otley	30	11	0	19	642	837	−195	9	3	56	
12	Luctonians	30	9	0	21	640	812	−172	12	8	56	
13	Sheffield Tigers	30	10	0	20	670	856	−186	8	3	51	
14	Harrogate (R)	30	9	0	21	477	730	−253	3	8	47	Relegated
15	Scunthorpe (R)	30	9	0	21	472	934	−462	2	5	43	Relegated
16	Preston Grasshoppers (R)	30	5	0	25	590	846	−256	3	9	32	Relegated

Updated to match(es) played on 29 April 2017. Source: "National League 2 North". NCA Rugby.
Rules for classification: If teams are level at any stage, tiebreakers are applied in the following order:
1. Number of matches won
2. Difference between points for and against
3. Total number of points for
4. Aggregate number of points scored in matches between tied teams
5. Number of matches won excluding the first match, then the second and so on until the tie is settled
  (C) Champion; (P) Promoted; (R) Relegated

== Results ==
=== Round 1 ===
3 September 2016
14:00

(BP) Leicester Lions	24 – 20	Tynedale (BP)
	Report

Westleigh Park
Attendance: 80
Referee: Anthony Woodthorpe

3 September 2016
14:30

Sedgley Park	16 – 13	Caldy (BP)
	Report

Park Lane
Attendance: 250
Referee: Llyr ApGeraint-Roberts

3 September 2016
15:00

Harrogate	7 – 21	Hinckley
	Report

Rudding Lane
Attendance: 270
Referee: Chris Bennett

3 September 2016
15:00

Sale	27 – 3	Otley
	Report

Heywood Park
Attendance: 252
Referee: Brendan McGaffney

3 September 2016
15:00

Scunthorpe	15 – 13	Chester (BP)
	Report

Heslam Park
Attendance: 500
Referee: Michael Harris

3 September 2016
15:00

Sheffield Tigers	10 – 22	Luctonians
	Report

Dore Moor
Attendance: 286
Referee: Ben Davis

3 September 2016
15:00

Stourbridge	19 – 13	South Leicester (BP)
	Report

Stourton Park
Attendance: 350
Referee: Callum Sharp

3 September 2016
15:00

Wharfedale	12 – 20	Preston Grasshoppers
	Report

The Avenue
Attendance: 525
Referee: Hamish Smales

=== Round 2 ===
10 September 2016
14:00

(BP) Otley	39 – 27	Wharfedale
	Report

Cross Green
Attendance: 630
Referee: Jonathon Cook

10 September 2016
14:15

Preston Grasshoppers	22 – 33	Sedgley Park (BP)
	Report

Lightfoot Green
Attendance: 263
Referee: Brendan McGaffney

10 September 2016
15:00

Chester	17 – 35	Caldy (BP)
	Report

Hare Lane
Attendance: 372
Referee: Luke Haskins

10 September 2016
15:00

Hinckley	6 – 40	Sale (BP)
	Report

Leicester Road
Attendance: 600
Referee: Calum Sharp

10 September 2016
15:00

(BP) Luctonians	32 – 49	Stourbridge (BP)
	Report

Mortimer Park
Attendance: 420
Referee: Sara Cox

10 September 2016
15:00

(BP) Sheffield Tigers	40 – 10	Scunthorpe
	Report

Dore Moor
Attendance: 273
Referee: Hamish Smales

10 September 2016
15:00

(BP) South Leicester	18 – 19	Leicester Lions
	Report

Welford Road Ground
Attendance: 150
Referee: Alexander Thomas

10 September 2016
15:00

Tynedale	20 – 16	Harrogate (BP)
	Report

Tynedale Park
Attendance: 400
Referee: Benjamin Davis

=== Round 3 ===
17 September 2016
14:00

(BP) Leicester Lions	14 – 16	Luctonians
	Report

Westleigh Park
Attendance: 120
Referee: Hamish Smales

17 September 2016
14:30

(BP) Sedgley Park	32 – 17	Otley
	Report

Park Lane
Attendance: 250
Referee: Ben Rayner

17 September 2016
15:00

(BP) Chester	31 – 5	Preston Grasshoppers
	Report

Hare Lane
Attendance: 244
Referee: Chris Bennett

17 September 2016
15:00

Harrogate	16 – 34	South Leicester (BP)
	Report

Rudding Lane
Attendance: 270
Referee: Llyr ApGeraint-Roberts

17 September 2016
15:00

(BP) Sale	45 – 13	Tynedale
	Report

Heywood Road
Attendance: 269
Referee: Michael Harris

17 September 2016
15:00

Scunthorpe	18 – 56	Caldy (BP)
	Report

Heslam Park
Attendance: 179
Referee: Jonathon Cook

17 September 2016
15:00

(BP) Stourbridge	49 – 21	Sheffield Tigers
	Report

Stourton Park
Attendance: 360
Referee: Neil Chivers

17 September 2016
15:00

(BP) Wharfedale	51 - 33	Hinckley (BP)
	Report

The Avenue
Attendance: 421
Referee: Brendan McGaffney

=== Round 4 ===
24 September 2016
14:15

Preston Grasshoppers	20 – 39	Caldy (BP)
	Report

Lightfoot Green
Attendance: 221
Referee: Ben Davis

24 September 2016
15:00

Hinckley	21 – 33	Sedgley Park (BP)
	Report

Leicester Road
Attendance: 250
Referee: Llyr ApGeraint-Roberts

24 September 2016
15:00

(BP) Luctonians	35 – 5	Harrogate
	Report

Mortimer Park
Attendance: 322
Referee: Sam Brown

24 September 2016
15:00

Otley	15 – 10	Chester (BP)
	Report

Cross Green
Attendance: 412
Referee: Hamish Smale

24 September 2016
15:00

(BP) Sheffield Tigers	26 – 41	Leicester Lions (BP)
	Report

Dore Moor
Attendance: 200
Referee: Chris Bennett

24 September 2016
15:00

(BP) South Leicester	42 – 39	Sale (2BP)
	Report

Welford Road Ground
Attendance: 75
Referee: Jonathon Cook

24 September 2016
15:00

(BP) Stourbridge	45 – 20	Scunthorpe
	Report

Stourton Park
Attendance: 390
Referee: Robbie Bourke

24 September 2016
15:00

(BP) Tynedale	35 – 10	Wharfedale
	Report

Tynedale Park
Attendance: 700
Referee: Calum Sharp

=== Round 5 ===
1 October 2016
14:00

(BP) Leicester Lions	37 – 13	Stourbridge
	Report

Westleigh Park
Attendance: 123
Referee: Neil Chivers

1 October 2016
14:30

(BP) Sedgley Park	24 – 24	Tynedale (BP)
	Report

Park Lane
Attendance: 195
Referee: Chris Bennett

1 October 2016
15:00

(BP) Caldy	34 – 3	Otley
	Report

Paton Field
Attendance: 178
Referee: Callum Sharp

1 October 2016
15:00

(BP) Chester	27 – 16	Hinckley
	Report

Hare Lane
Attendance: 326
Referee: James O'Brien

1 October 2016
15:00

(BP) Harrogate	17 – 24	Sheffield Tigers
	Report

Rudding Lane
Attendance: 250
Referee: Ryan Smith

1 October 2016
15:00

(BP) Sale	31 – 18	Luctonians
	Report

Heywood Road
Attendance: 221
Referee: Daniel Collins

1 October 2016
15:00

Scunthorpe	24 – 18	Preston Grasshoppers (BP)
	Report

Heslam Park
Attendance: 129
Referee: Alexander Thomas

1 October 2016
15:00

(BP) Wharfedale	38 – 32	South Leicester (2BP)
	Report

The Avenue
Attendance: 460
Referee: Jamie Leahy

=== Round 6 ===
8 October 2016
14:00

(BP) Leicester Lions	38 – 13	Scunthorpe
	Report

Westleigh Park
Attendance: 105
Referee: Anthony Woodthorpe

8 October 2016
15:00

Hinckley	7 – 21	Caldy
	Report

Leicester Road
Attendance: 250
Referee: Neil Chivers

8 October 2016
15:00

(BP) Luctonians	34 – 7	Wharfedale
	Report

Mortimer Park
Attendance: 387
Referee: Ben Davies

8 October 2016
15:00

Otley	20 – 18	Preston Grasshoppers (BP)
	Report

Cross Green
Attendance: 580
Referee: Michael Harris

8 October 2016
15:00

Sheffield Tigers	27 – 47	Sale (BP)
	Report

Dore Moor
Attendance: 248
Referee: James O'Brien

8 October 2016
15:00

South Leicester	27 – 27	Sedgley Park
	Report

Welford Road Ground
Attendance: 97
Referee: Alexander Thomas

8 October 2016
15:00

Stourbridge	18 – 12	Harrogate (BP)
	Report

Stourton Park
Attendance: 470
Referee: Chris Bennett

8 October 2016
15:00

(2BP) Tynedale	27 – 33	Chester (BP)
	Report

Tynedale Park
Attendance: 550
Referee: Jonathon Cook

=== Round 7 ===
15 October 2016
14:15

(BP) Preston Grasshoppers	51 – 17	Hinckley
	Report

Lightfoot Green
Attendance: 213
Referee: Chris Bennett

15 October 2016
14:30

(BP) Sedgley Park	76 – 35	Luctonians (BP)
	Report

Park Lane
Attendance: 344
Referee: Neil Chivers

15 October 2016
15:00

(BP) Caldy	56 – 13	Tynedale
	Report

Paton Field
Attendance: 212
Referee: Luke Haskins

15 October 2016
15:00

(BP) Chester	43 – 32	South Leicester (BP)
	Report

Hare Lane
Attendance: 327
Referee: Callum Sharp

15 October 2016
15:00

Harrogate	27 – 10	Leicester Lions
	Report

Rudding Lane
Attendance: 300
Referee: Jonathon Cook

15 October 2016
15:00

Sale	13 – 9	Stourbridge (BP)
	Report

Heywood Road
Attendance: 706
Referee: Ben Davis

15 October 2016
15:00

Scunthorpe	23 – 14	Otley
	Report

Heslam Park
Attendance: 172
Referee: Sam Brown

15 October 2016
15:00

Wharfedale	19 – 29	Sheffield Tigers (BP)
	Report

The Avenue
Attendance: 587
Referee: Michael Harris

=== Round 8 ===
22 October 2016
14:00

Leicester Lions	23 – 5	Sale
	Report

Westleigh Park
Attendance: 159
Referee: Sara Cox

22 October 2016
15:00

(BP) Harrogate	14 – 18	Scunthorpe
	Report

Rudding Lane
Attendance: 320
Referee: Ben Davies

22 October 2016
15:00

(BP) Hinckley	27 – 15	Otley
	Report

Leicester Road
Attendance: 400
Referee: Ben Rayner

22 October 2016
15:00

(2BP) Luctonians	31 – 32	Chester (BP)
	Report

Mortimer Park
Attendance: 422
Referee: Benjamin Russell

22 October 2016
15:00

Sheffield Tigers	20 – 14	Sedgley Park (BP)
	Report

Dore Moor
Attendance: 295
Referee: Ryan Smith

22 October 2016
15:00

South Leicester	21 – 21	Caldy
	Report

Welford Road Ground
Attendance: 50
Referee: Alexis Manley

22 October 2016
15:00

Stourbridge	19 – 8	Wharfedale
	Report

Stourton Park
Attendance: 400
Referee: Alexander Thomas

22 October 2016
15:00

(BP) Tynedale	26 – 22	Preston Grasshoppers (BP)
	Report

Tynedale Park
Attendance: 560
Referee: Calum Sharp

=== Round 9 ===
29 October 2016
14:15

(BP) Preston Grasshoppers	20 – 22	South Leicester (BP)
	Report

Lightfoot Green
Attendance: 198
Referee: Michael Harris

29 October 2016
14:30

Sedgley Park	27 – 24	Stourbridge (BP)
	Report

Park Lane
Attendance: 195
Referee: Callum Sharp

29 October 2016
15:00

(BP) Caldy	39 – 21	Luctonians
	Report

Paton Field
Attendance: 166
Referee: Chris Bennett

29 October 2016
15:00

(BP) Chester	30 – 14	Sheffield Tigers
	Report

Hare Lane
Attendance: 357
Referee: Ben Rayner

29 October 2016
15:00

(BP) Otley	39 – 21	Tynedale
	Report

Cross Green
Attendance: 422
Referee: Dave Sutherland

29 October 2016
15:00

(BP) Sale	37 – 13	Harrogate
	Report

Heywood Road
Attendance: 276
Referee: Jonathon Cook

29 October 2016
15:00

(BP) Scunthorpe	11 – 15	Hinckley
	Report

Heslam Park
Attendance: 173
Referee: Daniel Collins

29 October 2016
15:00

(BP) Wharfedale	21 – 23	Leicester Lions
	Report

The Avenue
Attendance: 417
Referee: Finlay Brown

=== Round 10 ===
5 November 2016
14:00

Harrogate	20 – 17	Wharfedale (BP)
	Report

Rudding Lane
Attendance: 580
Referee: Llyr ApGeraint-Roberts

5 November 2016
14:00

Leicester Lions	26 – 23	Sedgley Park (BP)
	Report

Westleigh Park
Attendance: 87
Referee: Neil Chivers

5 November 2016
14:00

Sheffield Tigers	10 – 34	Caldy (BP)
	Report

Dore Moor
Attendance: 236
Referee: Ben Davies

5 November 2016
14:00

Tynedale	12 – 22	Hinckley
	Report

Tynedale Park
Attendance: 400
Referee: Jonathon Cook

5 November 2016
14:15

Luctonians	20 – 12	Preston Grasshoppers
	Report

Mortimer Park
Attendance: 337
Referee: Claire Hodnett

5 November 2016
14:15

(BP) Sale	52 – 5	Scunthorpe
	Report

Heywood Road
Attendance: 289
Referee: Rob Teare

5 November 2016
14:15

(BP) South Leicester	33 – 31	Otley (2BP)
	Report

Welford Road Ground
Attendance: 75
Referee: David Conway

5 November 2016
15:00

(BP) Stourbridge	34 – 24	Chester (BP)
	Report

Stourton Park
Attendance: 550
Referee: Jack Makepeace

=== Round 11 ===
12 November 2016
14:00

Caldy	14 – 9	Stourbridge (BP)
	Report

Paton Field
Attendance: 135
Referee: Neil Chivers

12 November 2016
14:00

(BP) Otley	42 – 22	Luctonians
	Report

Cross Green
Attendance: 217
Referee: Callum Sharp

12 November 2016
14:00

(BP) Wharfedale	13 – 18	Sale
	Report

The Avenue
Attendance: 425
Referee: Alexander Thomas

12 November 2016
14:15

Preston Grasshoppers	32 – 21	Sheffield Tigers
	Report

Lightfoot Green
Attendance: 109
Referee: Anthony Woodthorpe

12 November 2016
14:15

(BP) Scunthorpe	15 – 17	Tynedale
	Report

Heslam Park
Attendance: 157
Referee: Jonathon Cook

12 November 2016
14:30

Sedgley Park	14 – 7	Harrogate (BP)
	Report

Park Lane
Attendance: 208
Referee: Mike Harris

12 November 2016
15:00

Chester	20 – 19	Leicester Lions (BP)
	Report

Hare Lane
Attendance: 380
Referee: Chris Bennett

12 November 2016
15:00

Hinckley	10 – 6	South Leicester (BP)
	Report

Leicester Road
Attendance: 320
Referee: Dave Clarkson

=== Round 12 ===
19 November 2016
14:00

Harrogate	6 – 3	Chester (BP)
	Report

Rudding Lane
Attendance: 200
Referee: Ben Rayner

19 November 2016
14:00

Leicester Lions	11 – 31	Caldy (BP)
	Report

Westleigh Park
Attendance: 113
Referee: Callum Sharpe

19 November 2016
14:00

(BP) Sheffield Tigers	13 – 17	Otley
	Report

Dore Moor
Attendance: 243
Referee: Chris Bennett

19 November 2016
14:00

Wharfedale	19 – 12	Scunthorpe (BP)
	Report

The Avenue
Attendance: 340
Referee: Jamie Leahy

19 November 2016
14:15

(BP) Luctonians	14 – 22	Hinckley (BP)
	Report

Mortimer Park
Attendance: 343
Referee: Shane Lewis

19 November 2016
14:15

Sale	25 – 24	Sedgley Park (BP)
	Report

Heywood Road
Attendance: 435
Referee: Calum Howard

19 November 2016
14:15

(BP) South Leicester	25 – 26	Tynedale
	Report

Welford Road Ground
Attendance: 75
Referee: Benjamin Davis

19 November 2016
15:00

Stourbridge	19 – 10	Preston Grasshoppers
	Report

Stourton Park
Attendance: 300
Referee: Ben Russell

=== Round 13 ===
26 November 2016
14:00

(BP) Caldy	48 – 13	Harrogate
	Report

Paton Field
Attendance: 189
Referee: Chris Bennett

26 November 2016
14:00

Otley	14 – 7	Stourbridge (BP)
	Report

Cross Green
Attendance: 426
Referee: Ben Raynor

26 November 2016
14:00

(BP) Tynedale	29 – 24	Luctonians (2BP)
	Report

Tynedale Park
Attendance: 375
Referee: Neil Chivers

26 November 2016
14:15

Scunthorpe	10 – 35	South Leicester (BP)
	Report

Heslam Park
Attendance: 110
Referee: Callum Sharp

26 November 2016
14:30

(BP) Sedgley Park	39 – 8	Wharfedale
	Report

Park Lane
Attendance: 210
Referee: Matt Turvey

26 November 2016
15:00

Chester	5 – 17	Sale
	Report

Hare Lane
Attendance: 462
Referee: Michael Harris

26 November 2016
15:00

(BP) Hinckley	47 – 24	Sheffield Tigers (BP)
	Report

Leicester Road
Attendance: 520
Referee: Daniel Collins

26 November 2016

Preston Grasshoppers	P – P	Leicester Lions

- Postponed due to frozen pitch. Game to be rescheduled for 25 February 2017.

=== Round 14 ===
3 December 2016
14:00

Harrogate	28 – 26	Preston Grasshoppers (BP)
	Report

Rudding Lane
Attendance: 220
Referee: James O'Brien

3 December 2016
14:00

(BP) Leicester Lions	32 – 25	Otley (BP)
	Report

Westleigh Park
Attendance: 102
Referee: Finlay Brown

3 December 2016
14:00

Sheffield Tigers	12 – 34	Tynedale (BP)
	Report

Dore Moor
Attendance: 256
Referee: Ben Rayner

3 December 2016
14:00

Wharfedale	27 – 21	Chester (BP)
	Report

The Avenue
Attendance: 287
Referee: Jonathan Cook

3 December 2016
14:15

(2BP) Luctonians	29 – 31	South Leicester (BP)
	Report

Mortimer Park
Attendance: 274
Referee: Robert Teare

3 December 2016
14:15

Sale	26 – 38	Caldy (BP)
	Report

Heywood Road
Attendance: 477
Referee: Jamie Leahy

3 December 2016
14:30

(BP) Sedgley Park	67 – 14	Scunthorpe
	Report

Park Lane
Attendance: 173
Referee: Harry Walbaum

3 December 2016
15:00

Stourbridge	15 – 10	Hinckley (BP)
	Report

Stourton Park
Attendance: 237
Referee: Kevin White

=== Round 15 ===
10 December 2016
14:00

(BP) Caldy	59 – 12	Wharfedale
	Report

Paton Field
Attendance: 181
Referee: Clare Hodnett

10 December 2016
14:00

Otley	26 – 15	Harrogate
	Report

Cross Green
Attendance: 673
Referee: Benjamin Davis

10 December 2016
14:00

(BP) Tynedale	25 – 33	Stourbridge (BP)
	Report

Tynedale Park
Attendance: 550
Referee: Chris Bennett

10 December 2016
14:15

Preston Grasshoppers	11 – 28	Sale (BP)
	Report

Lightfoot Green
Attendance: 442
Referee: Alex Thomas

10 December 2016
14:15

Scunthorpe	20 – 18	Luctonians (BP)
	Report

Heslam Park
Attendance: 153
Referee: Michael Harris

10 December 2016
14:15

South Leicester	25 – 13	Sheffield Tigers
	Report

Welford Road Ground
Attendance: 110
Referee: Robert Bourke

10 December 2016
15:00

Chester	15 – 15	Sedgley Park
	Report

Hare Lane
Attendance: 412
Referee: Callum Sharp

10 December 2016
15:00

(BP) Hinckley	14 – 17	Leicester Lions
	Report

Leicester Road
Attendance: 750
Referee: Llyr ApGeraint-Roberts

=== Round 16 ===
17 December 2016
14:00

Caldy	21 – 3	Chester
	Report

Paton Field
Attendance: 351
Referee: Llyr ApGeraint-Roberts

17 December 2016
14:00

(BP) Harrogate	15 – 22	Tynedale
	Report

Rudding Lane
Attendance: 275
Referee: Mick Harris

17 December 2016
14:00

(BP) Leicester Lions	29 – 26	South Leicester (BP)
	Report

Westleigh Park
Attendance: 189
Referee: Neil Chivers

17 December 2016
14:00

Wharfedale	27 – 17	Otley
	Report

The Avenue
Attendance: 847
Referee: Luke Haskins

17 December 2016
14:15

Sale	25 – 14	Hinckley
	Report

Heywood Road
Attendance: 669
Referee: Benjamin Davies

17 December 2016
14:15

Scunthorpe	26 – 12	Sheffield Tigers
	Report

Heslam Park
Attendance: 213
Referee: Alex Thomas

17 December 2016
14:30

(BP) Sedgley Park	34 – 17	Preston Grasshoppers
	Report

Park Lane
Attendance: 205
Referee: Jonathon Cook

17 December 2016
15:00

(BP) Stourbridge	26 – 5	Luctonians
	Report

Stourton Park
Attendance: 520
Referee: Phil Davies

=== Round 17 ===
7 January 2017
14:00

(BP) Caldy	38 – 0	Scunthorpe
	Report

Paton Field
Attendance: 157
Referee: Ben Rayner

7 January 2017
14:00

Otley	19 – 45	Sedgley Park (BP)
	Report

Cross Green
Attendance: 239
Referee: Chris Bennett

7 January 2017
14:00

Sheffield Tigers	17 – 40	Stourbridge (BP)
	Report

Dore Moor
Attendance: 316
Referee: Jonathan Cook

7 January 2017
14:00

(BP) Tynedale	28 – 37	Sale (BP)
	Report

Tynedale Park
Attendance: 400
Referee: Jamie Leahy

7 January 2017
14:15

Luctonians	8 – 26	Leicester Lions (BP)
	Report

Mortimer Park
Attendance: 462
Referee: Jack Lewars

7 January 2017
14:15

Preston Grasshoppers	12 – 29	Chester (BP)
	Report

Lightfoot Green
Attendance: 422
Referee: Ben Davis

7 January 2017
14:15

South Leicester	19 – 15	Harrogate (BP)
	Report

Welford Road Ground
Attendance: 70
Referee: Thomas Davies

7 January 2017
15:00

(BP) Hinckley	31 – 30	Wharfedale (2BP)
	Report

Leicester Road
Attendance: 555
Referee: David Clarkson

=== Round 18 ===
14 January 2017
14:00

(BP) Caldy	57 – 17	Preston Grasshoppers
	Report

Paton Field
Attendance: 198
Referee: Chris Bennett

14 January 2017
14:00

(BP) Harrogate	26 – 24	Luctonians (BP)
	Report

Rudding Lane
Attendance: 230
Referee: Llyr ApGeraint-Roberts

14 January 2017
14:00

(BP) Leicester Lions	32 – 17	Sheffield Tigers
	Report

Westleigh Park
Attendance: 97
Referee: Robert Teare

14 January 2017
14:00

Wharfedale	P – P	Tynedale

- Postponed due to frozen pitch. Game to be rescheduled for 25 February 2017.

14 January 2017
14:15

Sale	20 – 14	South Leicester (BP)
	Report

Heywood Road
Attendance: 372
Referee: Michael Harris

14 January 2017
14:15

Scunthorpe	15 – 26	Stourbridge (BP)
	Report

Heslam Park
Attendance: 175
Referee: Calum Sharp

14 January 2017
14:30

Sedgley Park	5 – 26	Hinckley (BP)
	Report

Park Lane
Attendance: 150
Referee: Alex Thomas

14 January 2017
15:00

(BP) Chester	26 – 12	Otley
	Report

Hare Lane
Attendance: 289
Referee: James O'Brien

=== Round 19 ===
21 January 2017
14:00

(BP) Otley	27 – 52	Caldy (BP)
	Report

Cross Green
Attendance: 350
Referee: Alexander Thomas

21 January 2017
14:00

(BP) Sheffield Tigers	14 – 19	Harrogate
	Report

Dore Moor
Attendance: 364
Referee: Ben Davis

21 January 2017
14:00

(BP) Tynedale	35 – 24	Sedgley Park
	Report

Tynedale Park
Attendance: 650
Referee: Michael Harris

21 January 2017
14:15

(BP) Luctonians	18 – 25	Sale (BP)
	Report

Mortimer Park
Attendance: 281
Referee: David Conway

21 January 2017
14:15

(BP) Preston Grasshoppers	24 – 25	Scunthorpe
	Report

Lightfoot Green
Attendance: 487
Referee: Steve Lee

21 January 2017
14:15

South Leicester	21 – 20	Wharfedale (BP)
	Report

Welford Road Ground
Attendance: 200
Referee: Harry Walbaum

21 January 2017
15:00

(BP) Hinckley	6 – 8	Chester
	Report

Leicester Road
Attendance: 450
Referee: Royan Smith

21 January 2017
15:00

Stourbridge	21 – 18	Leicester Lions (BP)
	Report

Stourton Park
Attendance: 400
Referee: Gareth Holsgrove

=== Round 20 ===
28 January 2017
14:00

(BP) Caldy	47 – 22	Hinckley (BP)
	Report

Paton Field
Attendance: 196
Referee: Jonathon Cook

28 January 2017
14:00

Harrogate	19 – 12	Stourbridge (BP)
	Report

Rudding Lane
Attendance: 220
Referee: Mick Harris

28 January 2017
14:00

Wharfedale	32 – 22	Luctonians (BP)
	Report

The Avenue
Attendance: 435
Referee: Alexander Thomas

28 January 2017
14:15

Preston Grasshoppers	30 – 5	Otley
	Report

Lightfoot Green
Attendance: 332
Referee: Chris Sharp

28 January 2017
14:15

(BP) Sale	35 – 15	Sheffield Tigers
	Report

Heywood Road
Attendance: 306
Referee: Chris Bennett

28 January 2017
14:15

(BP) Scunthorpe	15 – 17	Leicester Lions
	Report

Heslam Park
Attendance: 130
Referee: Llyr ApGeraint-Roberts

28 January 2017
14:30

Sedgley Park	21 – 10	South Leicester
	Report

Park Lane
Attendance: 150
Referee: Benjamin Davies

28 January 2017
15:00

(BP) Chester	10 – 11	Tynedale
	Report

Hare Lane
Attendance: 285
Referee: David Sutherland

=== Round 21 ===
4 February
14:00

(BP) Leicester Lions	28 – 15	Harrogate
	Report

Westleigh Park
Attendance: 113
Referee: Ben Rayner

4 February
14:00

Sheffield Tigers	14 – 8	Wharfedale (BP)
	Report

Dore Moor
Attendance: 324
Referee: Claire Hodnett

4 February
14:00

Tynedale	17 – 30	Caldy
	Report

Tynedale Park
Attendance: 400
Referee: Chris Bennett

4 February
14:15

Luctonians	23 – 14	Sedgley Park
	Report

Mortimer Park
Attendance: 334
Referee: Tom Davis

4 February
14:15

South Leicester	10 – 22	Chester
	Report

Welford Road Ground
Attendance: 105
Referee: Luke Haskins

4 February
14:30

(BP) Otley	32 – 8	Scunthorpe
	Report

Cross Green
Attendance: 328
Referee: Michael Harris

4 February
14:30

(BP) Hinckley	29 – 22	Preston Grasshoppers (BP)
	Report

Leicester Road
Attendance: 420
Referee: Ben Davis

4 February
14:00

Stourbridge	19 – 40	Sale (BP)
	Report

Stourton Park
Attendance: 290
Referee: Luis Caviglia

=== Round 22 ===
11 February 2017
14:00

(BP) Caldy	29 – 10	South Leicester
	Report

Paton Field
Attendance: 152
Referee: Michael Harris

11 February 2017
14:00

(BP) Wharfedale	37 – 0	Stourbridge
	Report

The Avenue
Attendance: 340
Referee: Chris Bennett

11 February 2017
14:15

Preston Grasshoppers	17 – 34	Tynedale (BP)
	Report

Lightfoot Green
Attendance: 298
Referee: Neil Chivers

11 February 2017
14:15

Sale	21 – 0	Leicester Lions
	Report

Heywood Road
Attendance: 289
Referee: Jonathan Cook

11 February 2017
14:15

(BP) Scunthorpe	15 – 18	Harrogate
	Report

Heslam Park
Attendance: 110
Referee: Alex Thomas

11 February 2017
14:30

Otley	25 – 12	Hinckley
	Report

Cross Green
Attendance: 206
Referee: George Selwood

11 February 2017
14:30

(BP) Sedgley Park	39 – 28	Sheffield Tigers (BP)
	Report

Park Lane
Attendance: 205
Referee: James O'Brien

11 February 2017
15:00

(BP) Chester	31 – 26	Luctonians (BP)
	Report

Hare Lane
Attendance: 336
Referee: Ben Rayner

=== Round 23 ===
18 February 2017
14:00

Harrogate	10 – 21	Sale
	Report

Rudding Lane
Attendance: 300
Referee: Mattheaus Rozier

18 February 2017
14:00

(BP) Leicester Lions	36 – 12	Wharfedale
	Report

Westleigh Park
Attendance: 117
Referee: Jamie Leahy

18 February 2017
14:00

Sheffield Tigers	26 – 37	Chester (BP)
	Report

Dore Moor
Attendance: 324
Referee: Luke Davies

18 February 2017
14:00

(BP) Tynedale	38 – 20	Otley
	Report

Tynedale Park
Attendance: 450
Referee: Richie Elliot

18 February 2017
14:15

Luctonians	5 – 36	Caldy (BP)
	Report

Mortimer Park
Attendance: 298
Referee: George Selwood

18 February 2017
14:15

South Leicester	23 – 10	Preston Grasshoppers
	Report

Welford Road Ground
Attendance: 75
Referee: Benjamin Davies

18 February 2017
15:00

(BP) Hinckley	41 – 20	Scunthorpe
	Report

Leicester Road
Attendance: 487
Referee: Callum Sharp

18 February 2017
15:00

(BP) Stourbridge	14 – 19	Sedgley Park
	Report

Stourton Park
Attendance: 350
Referee: Daniel Collins

=== Rounds 13 & 18 (rescheduled games) ===
25 February 2017
14:00

(BP) Wharfedale	27 – 3	Tynedale
	Report

The Avenue
Attendance: 339
Referee: Benjamin Davies

- Game rescheduled from 14 January 2017.

25 February 2017
14:15

Preston Grasshoppers	21 – 5	Leicester Lions

Lightfoot Green
Attendance: 387
Referee: Neil Chivers

- Game rescheduled from 26 November 2016.

=== Round 24 ===
4 March 2017
14:15

(BP) Preston Grasshoppers	23 – 24	Luctonians (BP)
	Report

Lightfoot Green
Attendance: 331
Referee: Llyr Apgeraint-Roberts

4 March 2017
14:15

Scunthorpe	7 – 61	Sale (BP)
	Report

Heslam Park
Attendance: 150
Referee: Claire Hodnett

4 March 2017
14:30

Otley	19 – 34	South Leicester (BP)
	Report

Cross Green
Attendance: 492
Referee: Ben Rayner

4 March 2017
14:30

(BP) Sedgley Park	36 – 27	Leicester Lions (BP)
	Report

Park Lane
Attendance: 200
Referee: Callum Sharp

4 March 2017
15:00

(BP) Caldy	41 – 7	Sheffield Tigers
	Report

Paton Field
Attendance: 254
Referee: Harry Walbaum

4 March 2017
15:00

(BP) Chester	31 – 0	Stourbridge
	Report

Hare Lane
Attendance: 411
Referee: Benjamin Davies

4 March 2017
15:00

(BP) Hinckley	15 – 19	Tynedale
	Report

Leicester Road
Attendance: 450
Referee: Chris Bennett

4 March 2017
15:00

Wharfedale	17 – 3	Harrogate
	Report

The Avenue
Attendance: 796
Referee: Michael Harris

=== Round 25 ===
11 March 2017
14:00

(BP) Leicester Lions	24 – 19	Chester (BP)
	Report

Westleigh Park
Attendance: 107
Referee: Luke Davies

11 March 2017
14:00

(BP) Tynedale	25 – 10	Scunthorpe
	Report

Tynedale Park
Attendance: 400
Referee: Michael Harris

11 March 2017
14:15

Luctonians	30 – 21	Otley

Mortimer Park
Attendance: 324
Referee: Chris Bennett

11 March 2017
15:00

Harrogate	10 – 46	Sedgley Park (BP)

Rudding Lane
Attendance: 230
Referee: Ben Rayner

11 March 2017
15:00

(BP) Sale	63 – 27	Wharfedale (BP)
	Report

Heywood Road
Attendance: 217
Referee: Harry Walbaum

11 March 2017
15:00

Sheffield Tigers	30 – 0	Preston Grasshoppers
	Report

Dore Moor
Attendance: 326
Referee: Jamie Leahy

11 March 2017
15:00

South Leicester	23 – 15	Hinckley
	Report

Welford Road Ground
Attendance: 155
Referee: Benjamin Russell

11 March 2017
15:00

(BP) Stourbridge	23 – 29	Caldy (BP)
	Report

Stourton Park
Attendance: 476
Referee: Jonathan Cook

=== Round 26 ===
25 March 2017
14:15

Preston Grasshoppers	15 – 26	Stourbridge (BP)

Lightfoot Green
Attendance: 346
Referee: Luke Davies

25 March 2017
14:15

(BP) Scunthorpe	27 – 26	Wharfedale (2BP)
	Report

Heslam Park
Attendance: 250
Referee: Llyr ApGeraint-Roberts

25 March 2017
14:30

Sedgley Park	10 – 42	Sale (BP)
	Report

Park Lane
Attendance: 250
Referee: Ryan Paul Smith

25 March 2017
15:00

Caldy	22 – 16	Leicester Lions (BP)
	Report

Paton Field
Attendance: 268
Referee: Michael Harris

25 March 2017
15:00

(BP) Chester	30 – 10	Harrogate
	Report

Hare Lane
Attendance: 354
Referee: Callum Sharp

25 March 2017
15:00

(BP) Hinckley	29 – 13	Luctonians
	Report

Leicester Road
Attendance: 450
Referee: Jack Lewars

25 March 2017
15:00

(2BP) Otley	33 – 34	Sheffield Tigers
	Report

Cross Green
Attendance: 326
Referee: Jonathan Cook

25 March 2017
15:00

(BP) Tynedale	29 – 23	South Leicester (BP)
	Report

Tynedale Park
Attendance: 500
Referee: Benjamin Davies

=== Round 27 ===
1 April 2017
14:00

(BP) Leicester Lions	40 – 14	Preston Grasshoppers
	Report

Westleigh Park
Attendance: 108
Referee: Claire Hodnett

1 April 2017
15:00

Harrogate	10 – 38	Caldy (BP)
	Report

Rudding Lane
Attendance: 450
Referee: Llyr ApGeraint-Roberts

1 April 2017
15:00

(BP) Luctonians	24 – 17	Tynedale (BP)
	Report

Mortimer Park
Attendance: 345
Referee: Dan Parrott

1 April 2017
15:00

(BP) Sale	28 – 19	Chester
	Report

Heywood Road
Attendance: 441
Referee: Matt Turvey

1 April 2017
15:00

Sheffield Tigers	27 – 22	Hinckley (BP)
	Report

Dore Moor
Attendance: 344
Referee: Ben Davis

1 April 2017
15:00

(BP) South Leicester	43 – 10	Scunthorpe
	Report

Welford Road Ground
Attendance: 75
Referee: Luis Caviglia

1 April 2017
15:00

(BP) Stourbridge	36 – 26	Otley (BP)
	Report

Stourton Park
Attendance: 325
Referee: Callum Sharp

1 April 2017
15:00

Wharfedale	13 – 10	Sedgley Park (BP)
	Report

The Avenue
Attendance: 478
Referee: Robert Bourke

=== Round 28 ===
8 April 2017
14:15

(BP) Preston Grasshoppers	32 – 48	Harrogate (BP)
	Report

Lightfoot Green
Attendance: 334
Referee: Michael Harris

- Preston Grasshoppers are relegated.

8 April 2017
15:00

Caldy	28 – 26	Sale (BP)
	Report

Paton Field
Attendance: 1,432
Referee: Callum Sharp

- Caldy are champions.

8 April 2017
15:00

Chester	22 – 15	Wharfedale (BP)
	Report

Hare Lane
Attendance: 384
Referee: Jack Sutton

8 April 2017
15:00

(BP) Hinckley	36 – 24	Stourbridge
	Report

Leicester Road
Attendance: 500
Referee: George Selwood

8 April 2017
15:00

Otley	17 – 65	Leicester Lions (BP)
	Report

Cross Green
Attendance: 286
Referee: Luke Davies

8 April 2017
15:00

(BP) Scunthorpe	33 – 72	Sedgley Park (BP)
	Report

Heslam Park
Attendance: 135
Referee: Paul Walbaum

8 April 2017
15:00

(BP) South Leicester	40 – 28	Luctonians (BP)
	Report

Welford Road Ground
Attendance: 75
Referee: James O'Brien

8 April 2017
15:00

(BP) Tynedale	41 – 40	Sheffield Tigers (2BP)
	Report

Tynedale Park
Attendance: 425
Referee: Ben Rayner

=== Round 29 ===
22 April 2017
14:00

(BP) Leicester Lions	49 – 12	Hinckley
	Report

Westleigh Park
Attendance: 175
Referee: Calum Sharp

22 April 2017
14:39

(BP) Sedgley Park	33 – 29	Chester (2 BP)
	Report

Park Lane
Attendance: 250
Referee: Adam Wookey

22 April 2017
15:00

Harrogate	15 – 35	Otley (BP)

Rudding Lane
Attendance: 750
Referee: Andrew MacNeaney

22 April 2017
15:00

(BP) Luctonians	19 – 25	Scunthorpe

Mortimer Park
Attendance: 321
Referee: Thomas Davis

22 April 2017
15:00

(BP) Sale	59 – 14	Preston Grasshoppers
	Report

Heywood Road
Attendance: 613
Referee: Jonathan Cook

22 April 2017
15:00

(BP) Sheffield Tigers	49 – 22	South Leicester

Dore Moor
Attendance: 410
Referee: Chris Bennett

22 April 2017
15:00

(BP) Stourbridge	24 – 52	Tynedale (BP)
	Report

Stourton Park
Attendance: 265
Referee: Ben Russell

22 April 2017
15:00

(BP) Wharfedale	19 – 20	Caldy

The Avenue
Attendance: 693
Referee: Harry Wallbaum

=== Round 30 ===
29 April 2017
15:00

(2BP) Caldy	34 – 35	Sedgley Park (BP)

Paton Field
Attendance: 723
Referee: Llyr ApGeraint-Roberts

29 April 2017
15:00

(BP) Chester	22 – 8	Scunthorpe

Hare Lane
Attendance: 437
Referee: Michael Harris

- Scunthorpe are relegated.

29 April 2017
15:00

(BP) Hinckley	32 – 31	Harrogate (2BP)

Leicester Road
Attendance: 750
Referee: Neil Chivers

- Harrogate are relegated.

29 April 2017
15:00

Luctonians	23 – 36	Sheffield Tigers (BP)

Mortimer Park
Attendance: 409
Referee: Ben Davis

29 April 2017
15:00

Otley	14 – 44	Sale (BP)

Cross Green
Attendance: 412
Referee: Claire Hodnett

29 April 2017
15:00

(2BP) Preston Grasshoppers	35 – 41	Wharfedale (BP)

Lightfoot Green
Attendance: 376
Referee: Chris Bennett

29 April 2017
15:00

(BP) South Leicester	46 – 26	Stourbridge (BP)

Welford Road Ground
Attendance: 100
Referee: Ryan Smith

29 April 2017
15:00

(BP) Tynedale	28 – 32	Leicester Lions (BP)

Tynedale Park
Attendance: 575
Referee: Jonathan Cook

== Promotion play-off ==
Each season, the runners-up in the National League 2 North and National League 2 South participate in a play-off for promotion to National Division 1. Sale finished second in the 2016–17 National League 2 North and because they had a better record than the 2016–17 National League 2 South runners-up, Old Elthamians, they hosted the play-off match.

Team	Pld	W	D	L	PF	PA	PD	TB	LB	Pts
Sale	30	26	0	4	997	487	+510	18	2	124
Old Elthamians (P)	30	25	0	5	1071	533	+538	19	3	122

(P) Promoted

6 May 2017
14:30

Sale	14 – 19	Old Elthamians

Heywood Road
Attendance: 1,297
Referee: Calum Howard

== Attendances ==
- Does not include promotion play-off.

Club	Home Games	Total	Average	Highest	Lowest	% Capacity
Caldy	15	4,792	319	1,432	135	8%
Chester	15	5,376	358	462	244	18%
Harrogate	15	4,865	324	750	200	16%
Hinckley	15	7,152	477	750	250	24%
Leicester Lions	15	1,795	120	189	80	6%
Luctonians	15	5,279	352	462	274	14%
Otley	15	5,999	400	673	206	6%
Preston Grasshoppers	15	4,759	317	487	109	14%
Sale	15	5,832	389	706	217	11%
Scunthorpe	15	2,736	182	500	110	15%
Sedgley Park	15	3,235	216	344	150	7%
Sheffield Tigers	15	4,445	296	410	200	30%
South Leicester	15	1,487	99	200	50	
Stourbridge	15	5,683	379	550	237	11%
Tynedale	15	7,335	489	700	375	24%
Wharfedale	15	7,390	493	847	287	25%

== Individual statistics ==
- Note that points scorers includes tries as well as conversions, penalties and drop goals. Appearance figures also include coming on as substitutes (unused substitutes not included). Does not include promotion playoff.

=== Top points scorers ===
Rank	Player	Team	Appearances	Points
1	(England) Jack Lavin	Caldy	26	378
2	(England) Rickie Aley	South Leicester	30	329
3	(England) Luke McGovern	Sale	30	327
4	(England) Lewis Allen	Preston Grasshoppers	28	240
5	(England) Louis Silver	Luctonians	29	213
6	(England) Tom Hodson	Otley	28	209
7	(England) Luke White	Stourbridge	29	201
8	(England) Ashley Smith	Tynedale	23	190
9	(England) Stephen Collins	Sedgley Park	22	188
10	(England) Nick Royle	Caldy	30	160

=== Top try scorers ===
Rank	Player	Team	Appearances	Tries
1	(England) Nick Royle	Caldy	30	32
2	(England) Johnny Matthews	Sedgley Park	29	28
3	(England) Jamie Broadley	Sheffield Tigers	28	24
3	(England) Andrew Riley	Sedgley Park	28	24
4	(England) Jack Lavin	Caldy	26	21
5	(England) Devon Constant	Leicester Lions	24	20
6	(England) Oliver Walker	Tynedale	25	18
6	(England) Jack Moorhouse	Sale	29	18
7	(England) Peter Swatkins	Sheffield Tigers	25	17
9	(England) Jesiah Dickinson	Caldy	29	16

== Season records ==
=== Team ===
Largest home win — 53 points

67 – 14 Sedgley Park at home to Scunthorpe on 3 December 2016

Largest away win — 54 points

61 - 7 Sale away to Scunthorpe on 4 March 2017

Most points scored — 76 points

76 - 35 Sedgley Park at home to Luctonians on 15 October 2016

Most tries in a match — 12

Sedgley Park at home to Luctonians on 15 October 2016

Most conversions in a match — 9

Sale at home to Wharfedale on 11 March 2017

Most penalties in a match — 6

Scunthorpe away to Harrogate on 22 October 2016

Most drop goals in a match — 3 (x2)

Wharfedale at home to Scunthorpe on 19 November 2016
Wharfedale at home to Luctonians on 28 January 2017

=== Player ===
Most points in a match — 37

(England) Jack Lavin for Caldy at home to Preston Grasshoppers on 14 January 2017

Most tries in a match — 5 (x3)

(England) Johnny Matthews for Sedgley Park at home to Luctonians on 15 October 2016
(England) Andrew Riley for Sedgley Park at home to Scunthorpe on 3 December 2016
(England) Jack Lavin for Caldy at home to Preston Grasshoppers on 14 January 2017

Most conversions in a match — 9

(England) Luke McGovern for Sale at home to Wharfedale on 11 March 2017

Most penalties in a match — 6

(England) Steve Johnson for Scunthorpe away to Harrogate on 22 October 2016

Most drop goals in a match — 3 (x2)

(England) Tom Barrett for Wharfedale at home to Scunthorpe on 19 November 2016
(England) Tom Barrett for Wharfedale at home to Luctonians on 28 January 2017

=== Attendances ===
Highest — 1,432

Caldy at home to Sale on 8 April 2017

Lowest — 50

South Leicester at home to Caldy on 22 October 2016

Highest Average Attendance — 493

Wharfedale

Lowest Average Attendance — 99

South Leicester

== See also ==
- English rugby union system
- Rugby union in England
