= Chris Bentley (rugby union) =

English rugby union player

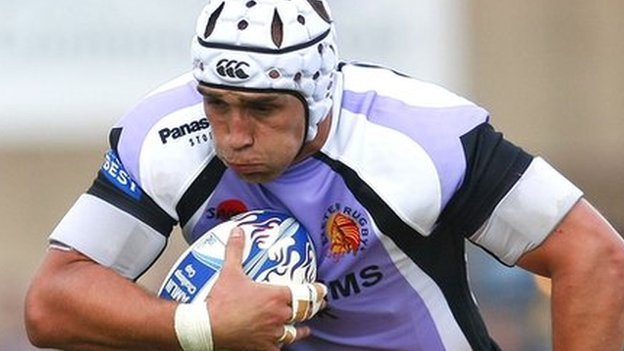
- Bentley playing for the Exeter Chiefs
- Born: 24 May 1979 (age 47) Sunderland, England
- Height: 1.98 m (6 ft 6 in)
- Weight: 118 kg (18 st 8 lb)
- School: Calday Grange Grammar School
- University: The University of Liverpool

Rugby union career
- Position: Lock
- Current team: Exeter Chiefs
Youth career
- 1990–1997: Caldy RFC
Senior career
Years	Team	Apps	(Points)
1997–1999	New Brighton	20	(10)
1999–2004	Orrell RUFC	128	(25)
2004	Biarritz	2	(0)
2004–2006	Exeter Chiefs	60	(30)
summer 2006	Tasman Mako	6	(0)
2006–2007	Edinburgh	12	(5)
summer 2007	Tasman Mako	10	(0)
2007–2013	Exeter Chiefs	66	(25)
Total		304	(95)
International career
Years	Team	Apps	(Points)
	England U21	2	(0)
–	Barbarians F.C.	1	(0)

Chris Bentley (born 24 May 1979) is an English former rugby union footballer previously of Exeter Chiefs in Premiership Rugby. His position of choice was right sided Lock.

== Career ==
After starting his senior career at New Brighton he gained the chance to play for Orrell following a suspension to club stalwart Chas Cusuani. He went on to play 128 first team games (including a record 64 consecutive 1st XV starts), leaving when the club owner Dave Whelan withdrew financial support. After a brief stint with Biarritz Olympique Pays Basque in the south of France, he joined the Exeter Chiefs for one of two stints that accrued 126 first XV appearances.

Taking a sabbatical when the Chiefs moved to Sandy Park, he played in the National Provincial Championship for Tasman Mako (as founder Mako number 4) spending the New Zealand off season at Edinburgh Gunners before returning to Exeter where he was part of the promotion winning team of 2010. He played two seasons in the Gallagher Premiership joining the corporate team at the club as sales manager for six years following his retirement.

== Post-retirement career ==
He now works in marketing.
