= 2017–18 National League 1 =

Rugby union competition in England

- Countries: England
- Date: 2 September 2017 – 28 April 2018
- Champions: Coventry (3rd title)
- Runners-up: Darlington Mowden Park
- Relegated: Fylde, Old Albanian, Hull Ionians
- Matches played: 240
- Attendance: 156,700 (average 653 per match)
- Highest attendance: 3,758; Coventry v Hull Ionians; 28 April 2018
- Lowest attendance: 103; Loughborough Students v Cambridge; 23 December 2017
- Tries scored: 1651 (average 6.9 per match)
- Top point scorer: 262 (England) Will Maisey (Coventry)
- Top try scorer: 21 (England) Sam Baker (Ampthill) (England) James Stokes (Coventry)

The 2017–18 National League 1, known for sponsorship reasons as the SSE National League 1 is the ninth season of the third tier of the English rugby union system, since the professionalised format of the second tier RFU Championship was introduced; and is the 31st season since league rugby began in 1987.

Following defeat at Blackheath on 10 March, Fylde are the first team to be relegated. A week later Coventry became the league champions with five games to go after beating Caldy away on the 17 March. On 21 April Old Albanian became the second team to go down with a game to go, losing 21–24 away to Plymouth Albion. The third and final relegation spot went to the taken by Hull Ionians who lost 21–38 away to champions Coventry on 28 April 2018 in front of a divisional record attendance of 3,758. As champions, Coventry are promoted into the 2018–19 RFU Championship, while relegated sides Fylde and Hull Ionians drop to the 2018–19 National League 2 North, and Old Albanian into the 2018–19 National League 2 South.

Of further interest were a number of divisional records set or equalled during the course of the season. These included a record crowd (3,758 at Coventry) and record overall league average attendance (653), while Coventry's promotion meant they now had 3 tier titles (equal with Otley). Ampthill also equalled a more obscure record of four league draws previously achieved by both Wharfedale and Richmond.

== Structure ==
The league consists of sixteen teams with all the teams playing each other on a home and away basis to make a total of thirty matches each. There is one promotion place with the champions promoted to the Greene King IPA Championship. There are usually three relegation places with the bottom three teams relegated to either National League 2 North or National League 2 South depending on the geographical location of the team.

== Participating teams and locations ==
2017–18 National 1 teams in England
2017–18 Greater London National League 1 clubs

Twelve of the sixteen teams participated in the preceding season's competition. The 2016–17 champions, Hartpury College, were promoted to the 2017–18 RFU Championship, replacing London Welsh who went into liquidation, in the second half of the season, and ceased to exist as a professional team. Due to London Welsh's liquidation only two teams (instead of the usual three) were relegated last season – Macclesfield and Blaydon – both of whom drop to the 2017–18 National League 2 North.

The promoted teams are Bishop's Stortford and Caldy, champions of the 2016–17 National League 2 South and 2016–17 National League 2 North respectively, and Old Elthamians who won the promotion play-off against Sale FC. National League 1 is the highest level all three of these sides have ever reached.

Team	Ground	Capacity	City/Area	Previous season
Ampthill	Dillingham Park	3,000	Ampthill, Bedfordshire	3rd
Birmingham Moseley	Billesley Common	5,000 (1,300 seated)	Birmingham, West Midlands	5th
Bishop's Stortford	Silver Leys	1,600	Bishop's Stortford, Hertfordshire	Promoted from National League 2 South (champions)
Blackheath	Well Hall	1,650 (550 seats)	Eltham, Greenwich, Greater London	7th
Caldy	Paton Field	4,000	Thurstaston, Wirral, Merseyside	Promoted from National League 2 North (champions)
Cambridge	Grantchester Road	2,200 (200 seats)	Cambridge, Cambridgeshire	14th
Coventry	Butts Park Arena	4,000 (3,000 seats)	Coventry, West Midlands	4th
Darlington Mowden Park	Northern Echo Arena	25,500	Darlington, County Durham	10th
Esher	Molesey Road	3,500 (1,200 seats)	Hersham, Surrey	8th
Fylde	Woodlands Memorial Ground	7,500 (500 seats)	Lytham St. Annes, Lancashire	12th
Hull Ionians	Brantingham Park	1,500 (240 seats)	Brantingham, East Riding of Yorkshire	13th
Loughborough Students	Loughborough University Stadium	3,000	Loughborough, Leicestershire	11th
Old Albanian	Woollam Playing Fields	1,000	St Albans, Hertfordshire	9th
Old Elthamians	College Meadow	1,800	Eltham, Greenwich, London	Promoted from National League 2 South (play-off)
Plymouth Albion	The Brickfields	8,500	Plymouth, Devon	2nd
Rosslyn Park	The Rock	2,000 (630 seats)	Roehampton, London	6th

== League table ==
2017–18 National League 1 table
Pos	Team	Pld	W	D	L	PF	PA	PD	TB	LB	Pts	Qualification
1	Coventry (C)	30	27	0	3	1213	495	+718	26	0	134	Promoted
2	Darlington Mowden Park	30	23	1	6	838	637	+201	19	2	115	
3	Plymouth Albion	30	20	2	8	844	549	+295	18	6	108	
4	Ampthill	30	19	4	7	797	540	+257	17	5	106	
5	Blackheath	30	17	2	11	764	636	+128	13	3	88	
6	Old Elthamians	30	15	1	14	714	709	+5	14	5	81	
7	Birmingham Moseley	30	14	2	14	680	770	−90	13	6	79	
8	Bishop's Stortford	30	15	1	14	750	713	+37	8	8	78	
9	Esher	30	11	2	17	774	827	−53	18	8	74	
10	Cambridge	30	14	0	16	613	600	+13	8	8	72	
11	Caldy	30	12	0	18	726	743	−17	12	8	68	
12	Rosslyn Park	30	10	2	18	766	863	−97	15	7	66	
13	Loughborough Students	30	10	3	17	756	894	−138	10	6	62	
14	Hull Ionians (R)	30	10	1	19	685	941	−256	14	3	59	Relegated
15	Old Albanian (R)	30	9	1	20	620	941	−321	11	5	54	Relegated
16	Fylde (R)	30	3	0	27	405	1087	−682	4	4	20	Relegated

Updated to match(es) played on 12 May 2018. Source:
Rules for classification: Points system: 4 points for a win; 2 points for a draw; 1 point if a team loses by seven points or less (losing bonus); 1 point if the team scores four or more tries in a match (try bonus)
- If teams are level at any stage, tiebreakers are applied in the following order:
1. Number of matches won
2. Difference between points for and against
3. Total number of points for
4. Aggregate number of points scored in matches between tied teams
5. Number of matches won excluding the first match, then the second and so on until the tie is settled
  (C) Champion; (R) Relegated

== Fixtures ==
=== Round 1 ===
2 September 2017
15:00

Birmingham Moseley	21 – 21	Ampthill
	Report

Billesley Common
Attendance: 717
Referee: Calum Howard

2 September 2017
15:00

(BP) Bishop's Stortford	49 – 26	Caldy (BP)
	Report

Silver Leys
Attendance: 720
Referee: Robert Bourke

2 September 2017
15:00

(BP) Blackheath	32 – 31	Plymouth Albion (2 BP)
	Report

Well Hall
Attendance: 563
Referee: Veryan Boscawen

2 September 2017
15:00

(BP) Darlington Mowden Park	33 – 23	Loughborough Students
	Report

Northern Echo Arena
Attendance: 878
Referee: Daniel Collins

2 September 2017
15:00

(BP) Esher	39 – 14	Old Elthamians
	Report

Molesey Road
Attendance: 621
Referee: Gareth Holsgrove

2 September 2017
15:00

Fylde	12 – 25	Cambridge
	Report

Woodlands Memorial Ground
Attendance: 537
Referee: Ian Tempest

2 September 2017
15:00

Hull Ionians	20 – 63	Coventry (BP)
	Report

Brantingham Park
Attendance: 324
Referee: Alexander Thomas

2 September 2017
15:00

Old Albanian	0 – 58	Rosslyn Park (BP)
	Report

Woollam Playing Fields
Attendance: 345
Referee: Simon Harding

=== Round 2 ===
9 September 2017
15:00

(BP) Ampthill	28 – 24	Old Albanian (BP)
	Report

Dillingham Park
Attendance: 311
Referee: Philip Davies

9 September 2017
15:00

(BP) Caldy	37 – 19	Fylde
	Report

Paton Field
Attendance: 423
Referee: Michael Harris

9 September 2017
15:00

(BP) Cambridge	9 – 14	Loughborough Students
	Report

Grantchester Road
Attendance: 412
Referee: Thomas Davis

9 September 2017
15:00

(BP) Coventry	50 – 11	Birmingham Moseley
	Report

Butts Park Arena
Attendance: 2,242
Referee: Jamie Leahy

9 September 2017
15:00

Hull Ionians	15 – 27	Darlington Mowden Park (BP)
	Report

Brantingham Park
Attendance: 224
Referee: Llyr ApGeraint-Roberts

9 September 2017
15:00

(BP) Old Elthamians	13 – 19	Bishop's Stortford
	Report

College Meadow
Attendance: 688
Referee: James Clarke

9 September 2017
15:00

(BP) Plymouth Albion	43 – 10	Esher
	Report

Brickfields
Attendance: 1,080
Referee: Calum Howard

9 September 2017
15:00

Rosslyn Park	6 – 25	Blackheath
	Report

The Rock
Attendance: 621
Referee: Matt Turvey

=== Round 3 ===
15 September 2017
20:00

(BP) Birmingham Moseley	38 – 24	Hull Ionians
	Report

Billesley Common
Attendance: 683
Referee: Neil Chivers

16 September 2017
14:00

(BP) Darlington Mowden Park	35 – 18	Cambridge
	Report

Northern Echo Arena
Attendance: 777
Referee: Michael Harris

16 September 2017
15:00

Bishop's Stortford	17 – 36	Plymouth Albion (BP)
	Report

Silver Leys
Attendance: 350
Referee: Fergus Kirby

16 September 2017
15:00

Blackheath	16 – 15	Ampthill (BP)
	Report

Well Hall
Attendance: 530
Referee: James Clarke

16 September 2017
15:00

(BP) Esher	32 – 17	Rosslyn Park
	Report

Molesey Road
Attendance: 620
Referee: Robert Bourke

16 September 2017
15:00

Fylde	7 – 43	Old Elthamians (BP)
	Report

Woodlands Memorial Ground
Attendance: 524
Referee: Jamie Leahy

16 September 2017
15:00

(BP) Loughborough Students	26 – 31	Caldy (BP)
	Report

Loughborough University Stadium
Attendance: 342
Referee: Alexander Thomas

16 September 2017
15:00

(BP) Old Albanian	19 – 21	Coventry
	Report

Woollam Playing Fields
Attendance: 420
Referee: Daniel Collins

=== Round 4 ===
23 September 2017
15:00

(BP) Ampthill	45 – 5	Esher
	Report

Dillingham Park
Attendance: 285
Referee: Shane Lewis

23 September 2017
15:00

Birmingham Moseley	17 – 31	Darlington Mowden Park (BP)
	Report

Billesley Common
Attendance: 714
Referee: James Clarke

23 September 2017
15:00

(BP) Caldy	16 – 20	Cambridge (BP)
	Report

Paton Field
Attendance: 769
Referee: Benjamin Davis

23 September 2017
15:00

(BP) Coventry	37 – 10	Blackheath
	Report

Butts Park Arena
Attendance: 1,455
Referee: Neil Chivers

23 September 2017
15:00

(BP) Hull Ionians	26 – 36	Old Albanian (BP)
	Report

Brantingham Park
Attendance: 157
Referee: Jamie Leahy

23 September 2017
15:00

(BP) Old Elthamiams	36 – 20	Loughborough Students
	Report

College Meadow
Attendance: 454
Referee: Thomas Davos

23 September 2017
15:00

(BP) Plymouth Albion	68 – 15	Fylde
	Report

Brickfields
Attendance: 996
Referee: Christophe Ridley

23 September 2017
15:00

(2BP) Rosslyn Park	24 – 31	Bishop's Stortford (BP)
	Report

The Rock
Attendance: 610
Referee: Fergus Kirby

=== Round 5 ===
30 September 2017
14:00

(BP) Darlington Mowden Park	32 – 26	Caldy (2BP)
	Report

Northern Echo Arena
Attendance: 822
Referee: Jamie Leahy

30 September 2017
15:00

Bishop's Stortford	22 – 41	Ampthill (BP)
	Report

Silver Leys
Attendance: 700
Referee: Stephen Light

30 September 2017
15:00

(BP) Blackheath	46 – 13	Hull Ionians
	Report

Well Hall
Attendance: 578
Referee: Sara Cox

30 September 2017
15:00

(2BP) Cambridge	28 – 29	Old Elthamians (BP)
	Report

Grantchester Road
Attendance: 395
Referee: Calum Howard

30 September 2017
15:00

(BP) Esher	26 – 61	Coventry (BP)
	Report

Molesey Road
Attendance: 733
Referee: Gareth Holsgrove

30 September 2017
15:00

(BP) Fylde	29 – 20	Rosslyn Park
	Report

Woodlands Memorial Ground
Attendance: 483
Referee: Michael Harris

30 September 2017
15:00

(BP) Loughborough Students	28 – 49	Plymouth Albion (BP)
	Report

Loughborough University Stadium
Attendance: 326
Referee: Daniel Collins

30 September 2017
15:00

Old Albanian	19 – 38	Birmingham Moseley (BP)
	Report

Woollam Playing Fields
Attendance: 324
Referee: Veryan Boscawen

=== Round 6 ===
7 October 2017
14:30

(BP) Old Elthamians	23 – 21	Caldy (BP)
	Report

College Meadow
Attendance: 295
Referee: Daniel Collins

7 October 2017
15:00

(BP) Ampthill	35 – 12	Fylde
	Report

Dillingham Park
Attendance: 386
Referee: Calum Howard

7 October 2017
15:00

Birmingham Moseley	14 – 55	Blackheath (BP)
	Report

Billesley Common
Attendance: 750
Referee: Gareth John

7 October 2017
15:00

(BP) Coventry	30 – 27	Bishop's Stortford (BP)
	Report

Butts Park Arena
Attendance: 1,703
Referee: Dewi Phillips

7 October 2017
15:00

(BP) Hull Ionians	43 – 28	Esher (BP)
	Report

Brantingham Park
Attendance: 183
Referee: Alexander Thomas

7 October 2017
15:00

Old Albanian	33 – 31	Darlington Mowden Park (BP)
	Report

Woollam Playing Fields
Attendance: 370
Referee: Robert Bourke

7 October 2017
15:00

Plymouth Albion	17 – 10	Cambridge (BP)
	Report

Brickfields
Attendance: 901
Referee: Gareth Holsgrove

7 October 2017
15:00

(BP) Rosslyn Park	49 – 12	Loughborough Students
	Report

The Rock
Attendance: 540
Referee: Veryan Boscawen

=== Round 7 ===
14 October 2017
14:00

(BP) Darlington Mowden Park	36 – 21	Old Elthamians
	Report

Northern Echo Arena
Attendance: 807
Referee: Matt Turvey

14 October 2017
15:00

(BP) Bishop's Stortford	35 – 31	Hull Ionians (2BP)
	Report

Silver Leys
Attendance: 760
Referee: Gareth Holsgrove

14 October 2017
15:00

(BP) Blackheath	31 – 3	Old Albanian
	Report

Well Hall
Attendance: 736
Referee: Calum Howard

14 October 2017
15:00

Caldy	17 – 34	Plymouth Albion (BP)
	Report

Paton Field
Attendance: 436
Referee: Alexander Thomas

14 October 2017
15:00

(BP) Cambridge	50 – 23	Rosslyn Park
	Report

Grantchester Road
Attendance: 453
Referee: James Clarke

14 October 2017
15:00

(2BP) Esher	27 – 32	Birmingham Moseley (BP)
	Report

Molesey Road
Attendance: 768
Referee: Daniel Collins

14 October 2017
15:00

Fylde	0 – 64	Coventry (BP)
	Report

Woodlands Memorial Ground
Attendance: 506
Referee: Jamie Leahy

14 October 2017
15:00

Loughborough Students	14 – 36	Ampthill (BP)
	Report

Loughborough University Stadium
Attendance: 213
Referee: Robert Bourke

=== Round 8 ===
21 October 2017
15:00

(BP) Ampthill	7 – 8	Cambridge
	Report

Dillingham Park
Attendance: 424
Referee: Daniel Collins

21 October 2017
15:00

(BP) Birmingham Moseley	25 – 27	Bishop's Stortford (BP)
	Report

Billesley Common
Attendance: 665
Referee: Neil Chivers

21 October 2017
15:00

(BP) Blackheath	39 – 24	Darlington Mowden Park (BP)
	Report

Well Hall
Attendance: 787
Referee: Gareth Holsgrove

21 October 2017
15:00

(BP) Coventry	36 – 0	Louthborough Students
	Report

Butts Park Arena
Attendance: 1,552
Referee: James Clarke

21 October 2017
15:00

(BP) Hull Ionians	33 – 14	Fylde
	Report

Brantingham Park
Attendance: 255
Referee: Lylr ApGeraint-Roberts

21 October 2017
15:00

(BP) Old Albanian	29 – 15	Esher
	Report

Woollam Playing Fields
Attendance: 320
Referee: Philip Davies

21 October 2017
15:00

Plymouth Albion	17 – 17	Old Elthamians
	Report

Brickfields
Attendance: 1,120
Referee: Robert Bourke

21 October 2017
15:00

(BP) Rosslyn Park	36 – 32	Caldy (2BP)
	Report

The Rock
Attendance: 618
Referee: Calum Howard

=== Round 9 ===
28 October 2017
14:00

(BP) Darlington Mowden Park	33 – 31	Plymouth Albion (2BP)
	Report

Northern Echo Arena
Attendance: 890
Referee: Neil Chivers

28 October 2017
14:00

(BP) Old Elthamians	34 – 27	Rosslyn Park (2BP)
	Report

College Meadow
Attendance: 445
Referee: Finlay Brown

28 October 2017
15:00

Bishop's Stortford	18 – 14	Old Albanian (BP)
	Report

Silver Leys
Attendance: 743
Referee: Alexander Thomas

28 October 2017
15:00

Caldy	22 – 39	Ampthill (BP)
	Report

Paton Field
Attendance: 531
Referee: Michael Harris

28 October 2017
15:00

Cambridge	7 – 40	Coventry (BP)
	Report

Grantchester Road
Attendance: 912
Referee: Thomas Davis

28 October 2017
15:00

Esher	28 – 19	Blackheath
	Report

Molesey Road
Attendance: 1,022
Referee: Daniel Collins

28 October 2017
15:00

(BP) Fylde	22 – 26	Birmingham Moseley (BP)
	Report

Woodlands Memorial Ground
Attendance: 476
Referee: Benjamin Davis

28 October 2017
15:00

(BP) Loughborough Students	58 – 29	Hull Ionians (BP)
	Report

Loughborough University Stadium
Attendance: 251
Referee: Philip Davies

=== Round 10 ===
4 November 2017
14:00

(BP) Blackheath	19 – 21	Bishop's Stortford
	Report

Well Hall
Attendance: 624
Referee: Matthew Carley

4 November 2017
14:10

(BP) Hull Ionians	27 – 21	Cambridge (BP)
	Report

Brantingham Park
Attendance: 367
Referee: Matt Turvey

4 November 2017
14:15

(BP) Ampthill	33 – 7	Old Elthamians
	Report

Dillingham Park
Attendance: 273
Referee: Aled Evans

4 November 2017
15:00

(BP) Birmingham Moseley	36 – 10	Loughborough Students
	Report

Billesley Common
Attendance: 861
Referee: Jamie Leahy

4 November 2017
15:00

(BP) Coventry	38 – 14	Caldy
	Report

Butts Park Arena
Attendance: 1,587
Referee: Veryan Boscawen

4 November 2017
15:00

(BP) Esher	33 – 26	Darlington Mowden Park (2BP)
	Report

Molesey Road
Attendance: 869
Referee: Angus Gardner

4 November 2017
15:00

Old Albanian	15 – 16	Fylde
	Report

Woollam Playing Fields
Attendance: 310
Referee: Michael Hudson

4 November 2017
15:00

(BP) Rosslyn Park	26 – 26	Plymouth Albion (BP)
	Report

The Rock
Attendance: 683
Referee: Ben Breakspear

=== Round 11 ===
11 November 2017
14:00

(BP) Caldy	27 – 26	Hull Ionians (2BP)
	Report

Paton Field
Attendance: 278
Referee: Llyr Apgeraint-Roberts

11 November 2017
14:00

(BP) Cambridge	15 – 22	Birmingham Moseley
	Report

Grantchester Road
Attendance: 417
Referee: Calum Howard

11 November 2017
14:00

(BP) Darlington Mowden Park	36 – 7	Rosslyn Park
	Report

Northern Echo Arena
Attendance: 1,150
Referee: Alexander Thomas

11 November 2017
14:00

(BP) Old Elthamians	16 – 20	Coventry
	Report

College Meadow
Attendance: 454
Referee: Gareth Holsgrove

11 November 2017
14:15

Bishop's Stortford	24 – 17	Esher (BP)
	Report

Silver Leys
Attendance: 505
Referee: Philip Davies

11 November 2017
15:00

(BP) Fylde	19 – 26	Blackheath (BP)
	Report

Woodlands Memorial Ground
Attendance: 479
Referee: Benjamin Davis

11 November 2017
15:00

(BP) Loughborough Students	37 – 18	Old Albanian
	Report

Loughborough University Stadium
Attendance: 234
Referee: Matt Turvey

11 November 2017
15:00

Plymouth Albion	16 – 9	Ampthill (BP)
	Report

Brickfields
Attendance: 1,118
Referee: Veryan Boscawen

=== Round 12 ===
25 November 2017
14:00

Bishop's Stortford	22 – 22	Darlington Mowden Park (BP)
	Report

Silver Leys
Attendance: 367
Referee: Calum Howard

25 November 2017
14:00

(BP) Hull Ionians	27 – 11	Old Elthamians
	Report

Brantingham Park
Attendance: 277
Referee: Neil Chivers

25 November 2017
14:15

(BP) Ampthill	29 – 23	Rosslyn Park (BP)
	Report

Dillingham Park
Attendance: 235
Referee: Dan Parrott

25 November 2017
15:00

Birmingham Moseley	13 – 11	Caldy (BP)
	Report

Billesley Common
Attendance: 663
Referee: Alex Thomas

25 November 2017
15:00

(BP) Blackheath	21 – 22	Loughborough Students (BP)
	Report

Well Hall
Attendance: 474
Referee: Daniel Collins

25 November 2017
15:00

(BP) Coventry	29 – 14	Plymouth Albion
	Report

Butts Park Arena
Attendance: 2,065
Referee: Matt Turvey

25 November 2017
15:00

(BP) Esher	50 – 12	Fylde
	Report

Molesey Road
Attendance: 469
Referee: Veryan Boscawen

25 November 2017
15:00

Old Albanian	7 – 54	Cambridge (BP)
	Report

Woollam Playing Fields
Attendance: 270
Referee: Gareth Holsgrove

=== Round 13 ===
2 December 2017
14:00

Caldy	21 – 0	Old Albanian
	Report

Paton Field
Attendance: 312
Referee: Simon Mills

2 December 2017
14:00

Cambridge	16 – 27	Blackheath
	Report

Grantchester Road
Attendance: 417
Referee: Robert Bourke

2 December 2017
14:00

Darlington Mowden Park	21 – 15	Ampthill (BP)
	Report

Northern Echo Arena
Attendance: 877
Referee: Matthew Turvey

2 December 2017
14:00

(BP) Old Elthamians	47 – 17	Birmingham Moseley
	Report

College Meadow
Attendance: 341
Referee: Aled Evans

2 December 2017
15:00

(BP) Fylde	29 – 22	Bishop's Stortford (BP)
	Report

Woodlands Memorial Ground
Attendance: 571
Referee: Michael Harris

2 December 2017
15:00

(BP) Loughborough Students	49 – 38	Esher (BP)
	Report

Loughborough University Stadium
Attendance: 243
Referee: Gareth Holsgrove

2 December 2017
15:00

(BP) Plymouth Albion	29 – 3	Hull Ionians
	Report

Brickfields
Attendance: 956
Referee: Dan Parrott

2 December 2017
15:00

Rosslyn Park	13 – 43	Coventry (BP)
	Report

The Rock
Attendance: 840
Referee: Calum Howard

=== Round 14 ===
9 December 2017
14:00

(BP) Bishop's Stortford	43 – 12	Loughborough Students
	Report

Silver Leys
Attendance: 502
Referee: Thomas Davis

9 December 2017
14:00

Hull Ionians	P – P	Rosslyn Park

Brantingham Park

- Postponed due to bad weather (snow), game rescheduled to 24 February 2018.

9 December 2017
15:00

Birmingham Moseley	P – P	Plymouth Albion

Billesley Common

- Postponed due to bad weather (snow), game rescheduled to 24 February 2018.

9 December 2017
15:00

(BP) Blackheath	29 – 17	Caldy
	Report

Well Hall
Attendance: 380
Referee: Philip Davies

9 December 2017
15:00

(BP) Coventry	63 – 14	Ampthill
	Report

Butts Park Arena
Attendance: 1,776
Referee: Neil Chivers

9 December 2017
15:00

(BP) Esher	10 – 13	Cambridge
	Report

Molesey Road
Attendance: 955
Referee: Dan Parrott

9 December 2017
15:00

(BP) Fylde	10 – 13	Darlington Mowden Park
	Report

Woodlands Memorial Ground
Attendance: 583
Referee: Benjamin Davis

9 December 2017
15:00

Old Albanian	15 – 24	Old Elthamians
	Report

Woollam Playing Fields
Attendance: 312
Referee: Daniel Collins

=== Round 15 ===
16 December 2017
14:00

(BP) Ampthill	45 – 17	Hull Ionians
	Report

Dillingham Park
Attendance: 207
Referee: Jonathan Cook

16 December 2017
14:00

Caldy	15 – 7	Esher
	Report

Paton Field
Attendance: 278
Referee: Alexander Thomas

16 December 2017
14:00

Cambridge	22 – 21	Bishop's Stortford (BP)
	Report

Grantchester Road
Attendance: 620
Referee: Callum Howard

16 December 2017
14:00

(BP) Old Elthamians	32 – 7	Blackheath
	Report

College Meadow
Attendance: 1,653 (Note: The Rugby Paper reported an attendance of 1,653 while the NCA and Rugby Statbunker had an attendance of 1,453 for the game between Old Elthamians and Blackheath on 16 December 2017. From discussion with Old Elthamians chairman he says the Rugby Paper's version is accurate.)
Referee: Veryan Boscawen

16 December 2017
15:00

Darlington Mowden Park	P – P	Coventry

Northern Echo Arena

- Postponed due to a frozen pitch, game rescheduled for 24 February 2018.

16 December 2017
15:00

Loughborough Students	21 – 0	Fylde
	Report

Loughborough University Stadium
Attendance: 143
Referee: Dan Parrott

16 December 2017
15:00

(BP) Plymouth Albion	29 – 8	Old Albanian
	Report

Brickfields
Attendance: 1,232
Referee: Robert Bourke

16 December 2017
15:00

Rosslyn Park	30 – 26	Birmingham Moseley (2BP)
	Report

The Rock
Attendance: 620
Referee: Dan Collins

=== Round 16 ===
23 December 2017
14:00

(BP) Bishop's Stortford	34 – 20	Old Elthamians
	Report

Silver Leys
Attendance: 742
Referee: Daniel Collins

23 December 2017
14:00

(BP) Darlington Mowden Park	26 – 0	Hull Ionians
	Report

Northern Echo Arena
Attendance: 1,122
Referee: Mike Harris

23 December 2017
15:00

Birmingham Moseley	17 – 41	Coventry (BP)
	Report

Billesley Common
Attendance: 2,130
Referee: Veryan Boscawen

23 December 2017
15:00

Blackheath	17 – 17	Rosslyn Park
	Report

Well Hall
Attendance: 737
Referee: Dan Parrott

23 December 2017
15:00

(2BP) Esher	29 – 33	Plymouth Albion (BP)
	Report

Molesey Road
Attendance: 780
Referee: Calum Howard

23 December 2017
15:00

Fylde	9 – 34	Caldy (BP)
	Report

Woodlands Memorial Ground
Attendance: 723
Referee: Jonathan Cook

23 December 2017
15:00

(BP) Loughborough Students	21 – 28	Cambridge
	Report

Loughborough University Stadium
Attendance: 103
Referee: Neil Chivers

23 December 2017
15:00

(BP) Old Albanian	35 – 35	Ampthill (BP)
	Report

Woollam Playing Fields
Attendance: 360
Referee: Gareth Holsgrove

=== Round 17 ===
6 January 2018
14:00

(BP) Caldy	71 – 14	Loughborough Students
	Report

Paton Field
Attendance: 321
Referee: Llyr Apgeraint-Roberts

6 January 2018
14:00

Cambridge	P – P	Darlington Mowden Park

Grantchester Park

- Postponed due to waterlogged pitch. Game to be rescheduled for 17 March 2018.

6 January 2018
14:00

Hull Ionians	13 – 29	Birmingham Moseley (BP)
	Report

Brantingham Park
Attendance: 331
Referee: Matt Turvey

6 January 2018
14:00

(BP) Old Elthamians	55 – 10	Fylde
	Report

College Meadow
Attendance: 266
Referee: Alexander Thomas

6 January 2018
14:15

Ampthill	21 – 14	Blackheath (BP)
	Report

Dillingham Park
Attendance: 292
Referee: Neil Chivers

6 January 2018
15:00

(BP) Coventry	52 – 5	Old Albanian
	Report

Butts Park Arena
Attendance: 1,721
Referee: Tom Davis

6 January 2018
15:00

Plymouth Albion	P – P	Bishop's Stortford

Brickfields

- Postponed due to a waterlogged pitch. Game to be rescheduled for 17 March 2018.

6 January 2018
15:00

(BP) Rosslyn Park	44 – 37	Esher (2BP)
	Report

The Rock
Attendance: 862
Referee: Gareth Holsgrove

=== Round 18 ===
13 January 2018
14:00

(BP) Bishop's Stortford	20 – 22	Rosslyn Park (BP)
	Report

Silver Leys
Attendance: 551
Referee: Alexander Thomas

13 January 2018
14:00

Cambridge	P – P	Caldy

Grantchester Road

- Postponed due to a waterlogged pitch. Match rescheduled for 24 February 2018.

13 January 2018
14:00

(BP) Darlington Mowden Park	42 – 7	Birmingham Moseley
	Report

Northern Echo Arena
Attendance: 943
Referee: Neil Chivers

13 January 2018
15:00

(BP) Blackheath	61 – 29	Coventry (BP)
	Report

Well Hall
Attendance: 1,008
Referee: Gareth Holsgrove

13 January 2018
15:00

(BP) Esher	29 – 29	Ampthill (BP)
	Report

Molesey Road
Attendance: 711 (Note: The Rugby Paper reported an attendance of 380 while the NCA and Rugby Statbunker had an attendance of 711 for the game between Esher and Ampthill on 13 January 2018. Given that the NCA is using an official figure from the club, and the Rugby Paper source tends to underestimate Esher's attendances quite drastically, The 711 figure seems more accurate.)
Referee: Jonathan Cook

13 January 2018
15:00

Fylde	0 – 26	Plymouth Albion (BP)
	Report

Woodlands Memorial Ground
Attendance: 477
Referee: Matt Turvey

13 January 2018
15:00

Loughborough Students	21 – 25	Old Elthamians (BP)
	Report

Loughborough University Stadium
Attendance: 219
Referee: Jamie Leahy

13 January 2018
15:00

(BP) Old Albanian	50 – 28	Hull Ionians (BP)
	Report

Woollam Playing Fields
Attendance: 345
Referee: Calum Howard

=== Round 19 ===
20 January 2018
14:00

(BP) Caldy	8 – 10	Darlington Mowden Park
	Report

Paton Field
Attendance: 254
Referee: Matt Turvey

20 January 2018
14:00

(BP) Hull Ionians	32 – 21	Blackheath
	Report

Brantingham Park
Attendance: 257
Referee: Tim Wigglesworth

20 January 2018
14:00

Old Elthamians	12 – 7	Cambridge (BP)
	Report

College Meadow
Attendance: 277
Referee: Gareth Holsgrove

20 January 2018
14:15

Ampthill	22 – 12	Bishop's Stortford
	Report

Dillingham Park
Attendance: 155
Referee: Llyr ApGeraint-Roberts

20 January 2018
15:00

Birmingham Moseley	34 – 13	Old Albanian
	Report

Billesley Common
Attendance: 696
Referee: Dan Parrott

20 January 2018
15:00

(BP) Coventry	57 – 12	Esher
	Report

Butts Park Arena
Attendance: 1,626
Referee: Alex Thomas

20 January 2018
15:00

Plymouth Albion	P – P	Loughborough Students

Brickfields

- Postponed due to a waterlogged pitch. Game rescheduled for 31 March 2018.

20 January 2018
15:00

(BP) Rosslyn Park	31 – 15	Fylde
	Report

The Rock
Attendance: 653
Referee: Robert Bourke

=== Round 20 ===
27 January 2018
14:00

Bishop's Stortford	10 – 36	Coventry (BP)
	Report

Silver Leys
Attendance: 420
Referee: Neil Chivers

27 January 2018
14:00

(BP) Caldy	32 – 24	Old Elthamians
	Report

Paton Field
Attendance: 277
Referee: Callum Sharp

27 January 2018
14:00

Cambridge	16 – 14	Plymouth Albion (BP)
	Report

Grantchester Road
Attendance: 476
Referee: James Clarke

27 January 2018
14:00

(BP) Darlington Mowden Park	52 – 24	Old Albanian (BP)
	Report

Northern Echo Arena
Attendance: 855
Referee: Matt Dudman

27 January 2018
15:00

Blackheath	20 – 12	Birmingham Moseley
	Report

Well Hall
Attendance: 586
Referee: Robert Bourke

27 January 2018
15:00

(BP) Esher	38 – 27	Hull Ionians (BP)
	Report

Molesey Road
Attendance: 661
Referee: Philip Davison

27 January 2018
15:00

Fylde	5 – 26	Ampthill (BP)
	Report

Woodlands Playing Fields
Attendance: 413
Referee: Jamie Leahy

27 January 2018
15:00

(BP) Loughborough Students	37 – 15	Rosslyn Park
	Report

Loughborough University Stadium
Attendance: 278
Referee: Lylr ApGeraint-Roberts

=== Round 21 ===
3 February 2018
14:00

(BP) Hull Ionians	14 – 21	Bishop's Stortford
	Report

Brantingham Park
Attendance: 203
Referee: Jamie Leahy

3 February 2018
14:00

(BP) Old Elthamians	14 – 19	Darlington Mowden Park
	Report

College Meadow
Attendance: 208
Referee: Alexander Thomas

3 February 2018
14:15

Ampthill	17 – 17	Loughborough Students
	Report

Dillingham Park
Attendance: 162
Referee: Robert Bourke

3 February 2018
15:00

Birmingham Moseley	20 – 20	Esher
	Report

Billesley Common
Attendance: 576
Referee: Matt Turvey

3 February 2018
15:00

(BP) Coventry	47 – 3	Fylde
	Report

Butts Park Arena
Attendance: 1,357
Referee: Callum Sharp

3 February 2018
15:00

Old Albanian	6 – 32	Blackheath (BP)
	Report

Woollam Playing Fields
Attendance: 290
Referee: Gareth Holsgrove

3 February 2018
15:00

Plymouth Albion	21 – 16	Caldy
	Report

Brickfields
Attendance: 777
Referee: Daniel Parrott

3 February 2018
15:00

Rosslyn Park	10 – 7	Cambridge (BP)
	Report

The Rock
Attendance: 680
Referee: Calum Howard

=== Round 22 ===
10 February 2018
14:00

(BP) Bishop's Stortford	10 – 15	Birmingham Moseley
	Report

Silver Leys
Attendance: 313
Referee: Nicholas Wood

10 February 2018
14:00

(BP) Caldy	33 – 3	Rosslyn Park
	Report

Paton Field
Attendance: 376
Referee: Harry Walbaum

10 February 2018
14:00

Cambridge	20 – 8	Ampthill
	Report

Grantchester Road
Attendance: 415
Referee: Gareth Holsgrove

10 February 2018
14:00

(BP) Darlington Mowden Park	33 – 19	Blackheath
	Report

Northern Echo Arena
Attendance: 979
Referee: Matt Turvey

10 February 2018
14:00

Old Elthamians	16 – 12	Plymouth Albion (BP)
	Report

College Meadow
Attendance: 255
Referee: Benjamin Russell

10 February 2018
15:00

(BP) Esher	24 – 8	Old Albanian
	Report

Molesey Road
Attendance: 561
Referee: Robert Bourke

10 February 2018
15:00

(BP) Fylde	12 – 14	Hull Ionians
	Report

Woodlands Memorial Ground
Attendance: 412
Referee: Alexander Thomas

10 February 2018
15:00

(BP) Loughborough Students	24 – 31	Coventry (BP)
	Report

Loughborough University Stadium
Attendance: 512
Referee: Phillip Davis

=== Round 23 ===
17 February 2018
14:00

Hull Ionians	15 – 15	Loughborough Students
	Report

Brantingham Park
Attendance: 247
Referee: Matt Turvey

17 February 2018
14:15

(BP) Ampthill	30 – 14	Caldy
	Report

Dillingham Park
Attendance: 327
Referee: Dan Parrott

17 February 2018
15:00

(BP) Birmingham Moseley	36 – 21	Fylde
	Report

Billesley Common
Attendance: 594
Referee: Neil Chivers

17 February 2018
15:00

(BP) Blackheath	29 – 28	Esher (2BP)
	Report

Well Hall
Attendance: 787
Referee: James Clarke

17 February 2018
15:00

(BP) Coventry	40 – 10	Cambridge
	Report

Butts Park Arena
Attendance: 1,689
Referee: Jamie Leahy

17 February 2018
15:00

(BP) Old Albanian	36 – 17	Bishop's Stortford
	Report

Woollam Playing Fields
Attendance: 349
Referee: Jonathan Cook

17 February 2018
15:00

(BP) Plymouth Albion	34 – 19	Darlington Mowden Park
	Report

Brickfields
Attendance: 906
Referee: Gareth Holsgrove

17 February 2018
15:00

(2BP) Rosslyn Park	29 – 36	Old Elthamians (BP)
	Report

The Rock
Attendance: 647
Referee: George Selwood

=== Rounds 14, 15 & 18 (rescheduled matches) ===
24 February 2018
14:00

Cambridge	6 – 15	Caldy
	Report

Grantchester Road
Attendance: 390
Referee: Philip Davies

- Game rescheduled from 13 January 2018.

24 February 2018
14:00

Darlington Mowden Park	0 – 42	Coventry (BP)
	Report

Northern Echo Arena
Attendance: 1,879
Referee: Neil Chivers

- Game rescheduled from 16 December 2017.

24 February 2018
14:00

Hull Ionians	27 – 26	Rosslyn Park (2BP)
	Report

Brantingham Park
Attendance: 127
Referee: Dan Parrott

- Game rescheduled from 9 December 2017.

24 February 2018
15:00

(BP) Birmingham Moseley	16 – 20	Plymouth Albion
	Report

Billesley Common
Attendance: 475
Referee: Alexander Thomas

- Game rescheduled from 9 December 2017.

=== Round 24 ===
3 March 2018
14:00

Darlington Mowden Park	P – P	Esher

Northern Echo Arena

- Postponed due to bad weather (snow). Game rescheduled for 31 March 2018.

3 March 2018
14:00

Old Elthamians	P – P	Ampthill

College Meadow

- Postponed due to bad weather (snow). Game rescheduled for 30 March 2018.

3 March 2018
14:30

Bishop's Stortford	P – P	Blackheath

Silver Leys

- Postponed due to bad weather (snow). Game rescheduled for 30 March 2018.

3 March 2018
15:00

Caldy	P – P	Coventry

Paton Field

- Postponed due to bad weather (snow). Game rescheduled for 17 March 2018.

3 March 2018
15:00

Cambridge	P – P	Hull Ionians

Grantchester Road

- Postponed due to bad weather (snow). Game rescheduled for 31 March 2018.

3 March 2018
15:00

Fylde	21 – 31	Old Albanian (BP)
	Report

Woodlands Memorial Ground
Attendance: 451
Referee: Matt Turvey

3 March 2018
15:00

(2 BP) Loughborough Students	32 – 33	Birmingham Moseley (BP)
	Report

Loughborough University Stadium
Attendance: 158
Referee: Alex Thomas

3 March 2018
15:00

Plymouth Albion	P – P	Rosslyn Park

Brickfields

- Postponed due to bad weather (snow). Game rescheduled for 5 May 2018.

=== Round 25 ===
10 March 2018
14:30

(BP) Old Albanian	34 – 19	Loughborough Students
	Report

Woolham Playing Fields
Attendance: 303
Referee: Dan Parrott

10 March 2018
15:00

(BP) Ampthill	33 – 28	Plymouth Albion (2 BP)
	Report

Dillingham Park
Attendance: 297
Referee: Daniel Coles

10 March 2018
15:00

Birmingham Moseley	14 – 13	Cambridge (BP)
	Report

Billesley Common
Attendance: 571
Referee: Benjamin Russell

10 March 2018
15:00

(BP) Blackheath	36 – 5	Fylde
	Report

Well Hall
Attendance: 293
Referee: Jack Lewars

- Fylde are relegated.

10 March 2018
15:00

(BP) Coventry	48 – 13	Old Elthamians
	Report

Butts Park Arena
Attendance: 1,473
Referee: Matt Turvey

10 March 2018
15:00

Esher	17 – 28	Bishop's Stortford
	Report

Molesey Road
Attendance: 622
Referee: Andrew MacNeaney

10 March 2018
15:00

(BP) Hull Ionians	29 – 24	Caldy (BP)
	Report

Brantingham Park
Attendance: 408
Referee: Alexander Thomas

10 March 2018
15:00

(BP) Rosslyn Park	38 – 26	Darlington Mowden Park (BP)

The Rock
Attendance: 517
Referee: Nick Wood

=== Rounds 17 & 24 (rescheduled matches) ===
17 March 2018
13:00

Plymouth Albion	17 – 10	Bishop's Stortford (BP)
	Report

Brickfields
Attendance: 671
Referee: Calum Howard

- Game rescheduled from 6 January 2018.

17 March 2018
14:00

Cambridge	15 – 25	Darlington Mowden Park
	Report

Grantchester Road
Attendance: 331
Referee: Jonathan Cook

- Game rescheduled from 6 January 2018.

17 March 2018
15:00

Caldy	12 – 55	Coventry (BP)
	Report

Paton Field
Attendance: 546
Referee: Jame Leahy

- Game rescheduled from 3 March 2018. Coventry win league title.

=== Round 26 ===
24 March 2018
14:00

(BP) Darlington Mowden Park	41 – 35	Bishop's Stortford (2 BP)
	Report

Northern Echo Arena
Attendance: 894
Referee: Michael Harris

24 March 2018
14:30

(BP) Old Elthamians	42 – 26	Hull Ionians (BP)
	Report

College Meadow
Attendance: 253
Referee: Gareth Holsgrove

24 March 2018
15:00

Caldy	21– 20	Birmingham Moseley (BP)
	Report

Paton Field
Attendance: 385
Referee: Matt Turvey

24 March 2018
15:00

(BP) Cambridge	50 – 26	Old Albanian (BP)
	Report

Grantchester Road
Attendance: 463
Referee: Calum Howard

24 March 2018
15:00

Fylde	17 – 32	Esher (BP)
	Report

Woodlands Memorial Ground
Attendance: 380
Referee: Calum Sharpe

24 March 2018
15:00

(BP) Loughborough Students	34 – 34	Blackheath (BP)
	Report

Loughborough University Stadium
Attendance: 247
Referee: Nick Wood

24 March 2018
15:00

(BP) Plymouth Albion	21 – 24	Coventry
	Report

Brickfields
Attendance: 2,898
Referee: Dan Parrott

24 March 2018
15:00

Rosslyn Park	21 – 31	Ampthill (BP)
	Report

The Rock
Attendance: 324
Referee: Andrew Thomas

=== Rounds 19 & 24 (rescheduled matches) ===
30 March 2018
14:00

Old Elthamians	6 – 18	Ampthill
	Report

College Meadow
Attendance: 186
Referee: Neil Chivers

- Game rescheduled from 3 March 2018.

30 March 2018
14:30

Bishop's Stortford	15 – 5	Blackheath
	Report

Silver Leys
Attendance: 749
Referee: Veryan Boscawen

- Game rescheduled from 3 March 2018.

31 March 2018
14:00

Darlington Mowden Park	18 – 16	Esher (BP)
	Report

Northern Echo Arena
Attendance: 622
Referee: George Selwood

- Game rescheduled from 3 March 2018.

31 March 2018
15:00

(BP) Cambridge	29 – 19	Hull Ionians
	Report

Grantchester Road
Attendance: 313
Referee: James Clarke

- Game rescheduled from 3 March 2018.

31 March 2018
15:00

Plymouth Albion	P – P	Loughborough Students

Brickfields

- Game rescheduled from 20 January 2018 but postponed again due to a waterlogged pitch. Game to be rescheduled for 12 May 2018.

=== Round 27 ===
7 April 2018
15:00

(BP) Ampthill	15 – 17	Darlington Mowden Park
	Report

Dillingham Park
Attendance: 385
Referee: Veryan Boscawen

7 April 2018
15:00

(2BP) Birmingham Moseley	28 – 32	Old Elthamians (BP)
	Report

Billesley Common
Attendance: 752
Referee: George Selwood

7 April 2018
15:00

(BP) Bishop's Stortford	70 – 24	Fylde (BP)
	Report

Silver Leys
Attendance: 571
Referee: Luke Davies

7 April 2018
15:00

(BP) Blackheath	23 – 12	Cambridge
	Report

Well Hall
Attendance: 827
Referee: Andrea Piardi

7 April 2018
15:00

(BP) Coventry	32 – 27	Rosslyn Park (2BP)
	Report

Butts Park Arena
Attendance: 2,088
Referee: Llyr ApGeraint-Roberts

7 April 2018
15:00

(BP) Esher	23 – 25	Loughborough Students
	Report

Molesey Road
Attendance: 769
Referee: James Clarke

7 April 2018
15:00

(BP) Hull Ionians	33 – 14	Plymouth Albion
	Report

Brantingham Park
Attendance: 275
Referee: Alexander Thomas

7 April 2018
15:00

(BP) Old Albanian	43 – 25	Caldy
	Report

Woollam Playing Fields
Attendance: 320
Referee: Robert Bourke

=== Round 28 ===
14 April 2018
14:00

(BP) Darlington Mowden Park	40 – 7	Fylde
	Report

Northern Echo Arena
Attendance: 933
Referee: Benjamin Davis

14 April 2018
15:00

Ampthill	22 – 10	Coventry
	Report

Dillingham Park
Attendance: 738
Referee: Alexander Thomas

14 April 2018
15:00

(BP) Caldy	42 – 18	Blackheath
	Report

Paton Field
Attendance: 329
Referee: Lylr ApGeraint-Roberts

14 April 2018
15:00

Cambridge	22 – 32	Esher (BP)
	Report

Grantchester Road
Attendance: 425
Referee: Harry Walbaum

14 April 2018
15:00

(BP) Loughborough Students	32 – 14	Bishop's Stortford
	Report

Loughborough University Stadium
Attendance: 329
Referee: Matt Turney

14 April 2018
15:00

(2BP) Old Elthamians	29 – 34	Old Albanian (BP)
	Report

College Meadows
Attendance: 274
Referee: Philip Davies

14 April 2018
15:00

(BP) Plymouth Albion	28 – 24	Birmingham Moseley (BP)
	Report

Brickfields
Attendance: 1,563
Referee: Robert Bourke

14 April 2018
15:00

(2BP) Rosslyn Park	36 – 37	Hull Ionians
	Report

The Rock
Attendance: 582
Referee: Dan Parrott

=== Round 29 ===
21 April 2018
15:00

(BP) Birmingham Moseley	34 – 19	Rosslyn Park
	Report

Billesley Commn
Attendance: 1,158
Referee: Jack Lewars

21 April 2018
15:00

(BP) Bishop's Stortford	27 – 33	Cambridge (BP)
	Report

Silver Leys
Attendance: 1,152
Referee: Jonathan Cook

21 April 2018
15:00

Blackheath	28 – 23	Old Elthamians (2BP)
	Report

Well Hall
Attendance: 1,650
Referee: Jack Walsh

21 April 2018
15:00

(BP) Coventry	36 – 46	Darlington Mowden Park (BP)
	Report

Butts Park Arena
Attendance: 1,938
Referee: Daniel Collins

21 April 2018
15:00

(BP) Esher	42 – 28	Caldy (BP)
	Report

Molesey Road
Attendance: 1,203
Referee: Luke Davies

21 April 2018
15:00

(BP) Fylde	33 – 81	Loughborough Students (BP)
	Report

Woodlands Memorial Ground
Attendance: 550
Referee: Llyr Apgeraint-Roberts

21 April 2018
15:00

Hull Ionians	16 – 42	Ampthill (BP)
	Report

Brantingham Park
Attendance: 402
Referee: Neil Chivers

21 April 2018
15:00

(BP) Old Albanian	21 – 24	Plymouth Albion
	Report

Woollam Playing Fields
Attendance: 325
Referee: Callum Howard

- Old Albanian are relegated.

=== Round 30 ===
28 April 2018
15:00

(BP) Ampthill	36 – 5	Birmingham Moseley
	Report

Dillingham Park
Attendance: 342
Referee: Calum Howard

28 April 2018
15:00

Caldy	18 – 28	Bishop's Stortford
	Report

Paton Field
Attendance: 784
Referee: Benjamin Davis

28 April 2018
15:00

(BP) Cambridge	29 – 7	Fylde
	Report

Grantchester Road
Attendance: 524
Referee: Thomas Davies

28 April 2018
15:00

(BP) Coventry	38 – 21	Hull Ionians
	Report

Butts Park Arena
Attendance: 3,758
Referee: Alex Thomas

- Hull Ionians are relegated. Coventry's attendance of 3,758 is a divisional record.

28 April 2018
15:00

(BP) Loughborough Students	17 – 24	Darlington Mowden Park
	Report

Loughborough University Stadium
Attendance: 253
Referee: Dan Parrott

28 April 2018
15:00

Old Elthamians	0 – 30	Esher (BP)
	Report

College Meadow
Attendance: 311
Referee: Jack Lewars

28 April 2018
15:00

(BP) Plymouth Albion	29 – 5	Blackheath
	Report

Brickfields
Attendance: 1,171
Referee: George Selwood

28 April 2018
15:00

(BP) Rosslyn Park	55 – 14	Old Albanian
	Report

The Rock
Attendance: 780
Referee: Jamie Leahy

=== Round 24 (rescheduled game) ===
5 May 2018
15:00

(BP) Plymouth Albion	55 – 14	Rosslyn Park
	Report

Brickfields
Attendance: 695
Referee: Ben Russell

- Game rescheduled from 3 March 2018.

=== Round 19 (rescheduled game) ===
12 May 2018
15:00

(BP) Plymouth Albion	33 – 19	Loughborough Students

Brickfields
Attendance: 750
Referee: Charlie Gayther

- Game originally rescheduled from 20 January 2018 and then from 31 March 2018.

== Attendances ==
Club	Home games	Total	Average	Highest	Lowest	% Capacity
Ampthill	15	4,819	321	738	155	11%
Birmingham Moseley	15	12,005	800	2,130	475	16%
Bishop's Stortford	15	9,145	610	1,152	313	38%
Blackheath	15	10,560	704	1,650	293	43%
Caldy	15	6,299	420	784	254	10%
Cambridge	15	6,963	464	912	313	21%
Coventry	15	28,030	1,869	3,758	1,357	47%
Darlington Mowden Park	15	14,428	962	1,879	622	4%
Esher	15	11,364	758	1,203	469	22%
Fylde	15	7,565	504	723	380	7%
Hull Ionians	15	4,037	269	408	127	18%
Loughborough Students	15	3,851	257	512	103	9%
Old Albanian	15	4,963	331	420	270	33%
Old Elthamians	15	6,360	424	1,653	186	24%
Plymouth Albion	15	16,834	1,122	2,898	671	13%
Rosslyn Park	15	9,577	638	862	324	32%

== Individual statistics ==
- Note that points scorers includes tries as well as conversions, penalties and drop goals. Appearance figures also include coming on as substitutes (unused substitutes not included).

=== Top points scorers ===
Rank	Player	Team	Appearances	Points
1	(England) Will Maisey	Coventry	29	262
2	(England) George Cullen	Bishop's Stortford	28	259
3	(England) Joe Tarrant	Blackheath	30	232
4	(Canada) James Pritchard	Ampthill	29	202
5	(England) Owen Waters	Loughborough Students	24	192
6	(Scotland) Harry Leonard	Rosslyn Park	26	188
7	(South Africa) Warren Seals	Darlington Mowden Park	22	178
8	(England) Dan Mugford	Plymouth Albion	18	168
8	(England) Ben Jones	Caldy	29	168
9	(England) Joe Carlisle	Old Elthamians	28	161

=== Top try scorers ===
Rank	Player	Team	Appearances	Tries
1	(England) Sam Baker	Ampthill	30	21
1	(England) James Stokes	Coventry	30	21
2	(Guyana) Dominic Lespierre	Old Elthamians	25	19
2	(England) Nick Royle	Caldy	29	19
2	(Australia) Scott Tolmie	Coventry	29	19
3	(England) Max Trimble	Coventry	20	17
3	(England) Robert Knox	Coventry	25	17
4	(England) Callum Mackenzie	Darlington Mowden Park	28	16
4	(England) Sam Wilson	Hull Ionians	28	16
5	(Ireland) Ciaran Moore	Birmingham Moseley	24	15

== Season records ==
=== Team ===
Largest home win — 53 pts

68 – 15 Plymouth Albion at home to Fylde on 23 September 2017

Largest away win — 64 pts

64 – 0 Coventry away to Fylde on 14 October 2017

Most points scored — 81

81 – 33 Loughborough Students away to Fylde on 21 April 2018

Most points scored away from home — 81

81 – 33 Loughborough Students away to Fylde on 21 April 2018

Most tries in a match — 11 (2)

Bishop's Stortford at home to Fylde on 7 April 2018
Loughborough Students away to Fylde on 21 April 2018

Most tries in an away match — 11

Loughborough Students away to Fylde on 21 April 2018

Most conversions in a match — 9 (3)

Plymouth Albion at home to Fylde on 23 September 2017
Coventry at home to Ampthill on 9 December 2017
Caldy at home to Loughborough Students on 6 January 2018

Most penalties in a match — 7

Cambridge away to Loughborough Students on 23 December 2017

Most drop goals in a match — 1 (4)

Cambridge away to Fylde on 2 September 2017
Hull Ionians at home to Cambridge on 4 November 2017
Old Albanian at home to Ampthill on 23 December 2017
Hull Ionians at home to Rosslyn Park on 24 February 2018

=== Attendances ===
Highest — 3,758

Coventry at home to Hull Ionians on 28 April 2018

Lowest — 103

Loughborough Students at home to Cambridge on 23 December 2017

Highest average attendance — 1,869

Coventry

Lowest average attendance — 257

Loughborough Students

=== Player ===
Most points in a match — 26

(Wales) Gavin Roberts for Caldy at home to Loughborough Students on 6 January 2018

Most tries in a match — 5

(England) Ryan Hutler for Bishop's Stortford at home to Fylde on 7 April 2018

Most tries in an away match — 4

(England) Mark Harrison for Birmingham Moseley away to Esher on 14 October 2017

Most conversions in a match — 9

(England) Dan Mugford for Plymouth Albion at home to Fylde on 23 September 2017
(Wales) Gavin Roberts for Caldy at home to Loughborough Students on 6 January 2018

Most penalties in a match — 6

(England) Isaac Green for Hull Ionians away to Rosslyn Park on 14 April 2018

Most drop goals in a match — 1 (4)

(England) Jack Green for Cambridge away to Fylde on 2 September 2017
(England) Chris Bell for Hull Ionians at home to Cambridge on 4 November 2017
(England) Tom Bednall for Old Albanian at home to Ampthill on 23 December 2017
(England) Greg Lound for Hull Ionians at home to Rosslyn Park on 24 February 2018

== See also ==
- English rugby union system
- Rugby union in England
