= Sam Dickinson (rugby union) =

English rugby union player

- Born: Samuel Mark Dickinson; 28 January 1985 (age 41) Manchester, England
- Height: 1.93 m (6 ft 4 in)
- Weight: 114 kg (17 st 13 lb)
- School: Calday Grange Grammar School
- University: Liverpool John Moores University

Rugby union career
- Position: Back row
Senior career
Years	Team	Apps	(Points)
2000–2009	Caldy		
2009–2012	Rotherham Titans	63	(20)
2012–2018	Northampton Saints	89	(20)
2013	→ Moseley	8	(0)
2018–2020	Ealing Trailfinders		
2020–	Caldy		
- Correct as of 11 March 2018
International career
Years	Team	Apps	(Points)
2014	England Saxons	2	(0)
- Correct as of 11 March 2018

Samuel Mark Dickinson (born 28 January 1985) is an English rugby union player who plays for Championship club Caldy, having previously played for Premiership side Northampton Saints. He began his career at hometown club Caldy before moving to Rotherham Titans in 2009. He plays in the back row but has also spent time at lock. At international level he has represented the England Saxons.

== Club career ==
Dickinson was born in Manchester and began his career at Caldy. He joined Rotherham Titans in 2009 and played 63 times before moving to Northampton Saints three years later. He broke his arm days after agreeing to move to Saints and eventually made his debut against Exeter Chiefs in September 2013, over 18 months after signing. In April the following year he scored his first points for the Saints with a try in their 28–14 European Challenge Cup quarter-final victory over Sale Sharks. In 2014 Dickinson started as Northampton beat Saracens to win the Premiership final.

After making 89 appearances for Saints and captaining Northampton's second side the Wanderers to the Aviva 'A' League title in the 2016/17 season, it was announced that Dickinson would part company with Saints at the conclusion of the current season.

On 13 February 2018, Dickinson signed for RFU Championship club Ealing Trailfinders on long-term deal with immediate effect, leaving Northampton.

At the end of the 2019/20 season, Dickinson left Ealing Trailfinders before rejoining Caldy.

== International career ==
In October 2013 Dickinson was called up to the England Saxons squad as a replacement for Tom Johnson who had been called into the senior squad. The following January he was named in the Saxons Elite Player Squad and he made his debut that month as a replacement against the Ireland Wolfhounds. He made his first start a week later against Scotland A in a 16–16 draw.
