= Tom Cowan-Dickie =

English rugby union player

- Born: Tom Cowan-Dickie; 26 May 1991 (age 35) Truro, Cornwall, England
- Height: 1.83 m (6 ft 0 in)
- Weight: 110 kg (17 st 5 lb)
- School: Mounts Bay School
- Notable relative: Luke Cowan-Dickie

Rugby union career
- Position: Hooker
- Current team: Ospreys
Youth career
- —: Penzance & Newlyn
Senior career
Years	Team	Apps	(Points)
2009–2014	Exeter Chiefs	3	(0)
2009–2010	→Redruth (loan)	8	(10)
2010–2012	→Cornish Pirates (loan)	12	(0)
2012–2014	→Plymouth Albion (loan)	21	(5)
2014–2015	Plymouth Albion	15	(5)
2015–2016	Redruth	34	(60)
2016–2017	Plymouth Albion	29	(30)
2017–2021	Cornish Pirates	35	(40)
2021–2022	Leicester Tigers	10	(5)
2023-	Ospreys	0	(0)
2009–	Total	167	(155)
- Correct as of 19 November 2022
International career
Years	Team	Apps	(Points)
2011	England Under 20s	1	(0)
- Correct as of 5 November 2021

Tom Cowan-Dickie (born 26 May 1991) is a Cornish rugby union player currently playing for Ospreys in the United Rugby Championship. His primary position is hooker. He previously played for Cornish Pirates in the RFU Championship, the second division and has also played for Exeter Chiefs and Leicester Tigers in Premiership Rugby, Plymouth Albion, in both the RFU Championship and National League 1, and for Redruth in National League 2 South.

== Career ==
Cowan-Dickie came through the academy at Exeter Chiefs and went on loan to Cornish Pirates for the 2010–11 and 2011–12 season. He then signed a new contract with Exeter and went on loan to Plymouth Albion, before joining them permanently in 2014.

In 2016 Cowan-Dickie played a season for Redruth in National League 2 and represented Cornwall as they won the County Championship. He re-joined Plymouth for a single season in National League 1 before moving upwards again in 2017 to Cornish Pirates in the RFU Championship.

Injuries limited Cowan-Dickie's appearances for the Pirates but he signed a new contract in the summer of 2021, before joining Leicester Tigers on loan in September 2021. He made his Tigers debut on 18 September 2021 as a replacement in a win against his former club Exeter, and then scored his first try on 5 November 2021 securing the four-try bonus point with a last minute score against Bath. On 13 December 2021, his move to Leicester became a permanent transfer as he signed a contract until the end of the 2021–22 season. He left Leicester on 31 December 2022.

On 24 January 2023, Cowan-Dickie signed for Welsh region Ospreys as injury cover for the rest of the 2022–23 season in the United Rugby Championship.
