= Caldy RFC =

Rugby union team in Merseyside, England

Coordinates: 53.3598172°N 3.1442356°W

(England) Caldy
- Full name: Caldy Rugby Club
- Union: Cheshire RFU
- Nickname: The Ravers
- Founded: 1924; 102 years ago
- Location: Caldy, Wirral, England
- Region: Merseyside
- Ground: Paton Field (Capacity: 4,000)
- Chairman: Mark Loughran
- Coach: Matt Cairns
- League: Champ Rugby
- 2025–26: 11th of 14
Team kit

Official website
- caldyrugbyclub.com

Caldy Rugby Club is an English rugby union club which play in Champ Rugby, the second tier of English rugby, following their promotion from National League 1 at the end of 2021–22. Their home stadium is Paton Field in Thurstaston on the Wirral Peninsula.

On 23 April 2022 Caldy reached the highest level in the club's history when they beat title rivals Sale 13–9 in front of a crowd of 3,000 at Paton Field to win National League 1 and gain promotion to the RFU Championship (tier 2) for the 2022–23 season.

== Honours ==
- National Old Boys Sevens Winners: 1970–71
- Cheshire Cup winners (6): 1971, 2011, 2012, 2013, 2015, 2017
- North West 2 champions: 1997–98
- South Lancs/Cheshire 1 champions: 2002–03
- North Division 2 West champions: 2004–05
- North Division 1 champions: 2006–07
- National League 2 North champions (2): 2016–17, 2019–20
- National League 1: champions 2021–22

== Current standings ==
2026–27 Champ Rugby table
Pos	Team	Pld	W	D	L	PF	PA	PD	TF	TA	TB	LB	Pts	Qualification
1	Worcester Warriors	5	5	0	0	246	95	+151	37	14	4	0	24	Play-off semi-finals
2	Ealing Trailfinders	5	4	0	1	242	109	+133	38	16	4	1	21	Play-off semi-finals
3	Coventry	5	4	0	1	243	171	+72	36	26	2	1	19	Play-off quarter-finals
4	Rotherham Titans	5	4	0	1	160	191	−31	25	29	1	0	17	Play-off quarter-finals
5	Ampthill	5	4	0	1	195	195	0	29	29	0	0	16	Play-off quarter-finals
6	Cornish Pirates	5	3	0	2	182	187	−5	27	28	2	0	14	Play-off quarter-finals
7	Chinnor	5	3	0	2	180	183	−3	22	21	1	0	13	
8	Doncaster Knights	5	2	0	3	161	152	+9	24	21	1	2	11	
9	Bedford Blues	5	2	0	3	143	158	−15	22	24	2	1	11	
10	Blackheath	5	1	0	4	146	189	−43	20	27	0	3	7	
11	Caldy	5	1	0	4	176	206	−30	25	31	0	2	6	
12	Nottingham	5	1	0	4	128	206	−78	19	32	0	1	5	Relegation play-off
13	Hartpury	5	1	0	4	116	207	−91	16	31	0	1	5	Relegation play-off
14	Richmond	5	0	0	5	123	192	−69	19	29	0	1	1	Relegated

First match(es) will be played: 18 September 2026. Source:
Rules for classification: If teams are level at any stage, tiebreakers are applied in the following order:
1. Number of matches won
2. Number of matches drawn
3. Difference between points for and against
4. Total number of points for
5. Aggregate number of points scored in matches between tied teams
6. Number of matches won excluding the first match, then the second and so on until the tie is settled

== Current squad ==
The Caldy squad for the 2025–26 season is:

Caldy 2025–26 Champ Rugby squad
**Props**: (England) Ryan Higginson; (Ireland) Cian Jackson; (England) Ralph McEachran (Note: Sale Sharks players who are dual-registered with the club for the 2025-26 season.); (England) Matthew Rabbette; (Wales) Joew Sproston; (England) Nathan Rushton; (England) Monty Weatherby; **Hookers**: (England) Matt Gallagher; (Australia) Ollie Hearn; **Locks**: (England) Roubs Birch; (Ireland) Adam McNamee; (England) Sam Olyott; (England) Tom Sanders; (England) Jack Wilson	**Back row**: (England) Drew Davison; (England) JJ Dickinson; (England) Martin Gerrard; (England) Patrick Hogg (Note: Sale Sharks players who are dual-registered with the club for the 2025-26 season.); (England) Jordan Jones; (Poland) **Max Loboda**; (Scotland) Reuben Logan (Note: Sale Sharks players who are dual-registered with the club for the 2025-26 season.); (England) Tom Parry; (Wales) Dan Owen; (England) Callum Ridgway; **Scrum-halves**: (England) Tom Akehurst; (England) Tom Hanson (Note: Sale Sharks players who are dual-registered with the club for the 2025-26 season.); (Germany) **Michael McDonald**; (England) Jacob Mitchell; (England) Nye Thomas (Note: Sale Sharks players who are dual-registered with the club for the 2025-26 season.); (England) Ollie Wynn; **Fly-halves**: (England) Lewis Barker; (England) Dan Rabbette; (England) Kieran Wilkinson	**Centres**: (England) Mike Barlow; (England) Joe Bedlow (Note: Sale Sharks players who are dual-registered with the club for the 2025-26 season.); (Wales) Osian Roberts (Note: Sale Sharks players who are dual-registered with the club for the 2025-26 season.); (England) Connor Wilkinson; **Wings**: (England) Dylan Carroll; (England) Obi Ene (Note: Sale Sharks players who are dual-registered with the club for the 2025-26 season.); (England) Will Robinson; (Wales) Rhys Tudor; (England) Lucas Wiggins; **Fullbacks**: (England) Charlie Hyde; (England) Matt Kilcourse
**(c)** denotes the team captain. (vc) denotes vice-captain. **Bold** denotes internationally capped players.^{ST} denotes a short-term signing. Source:

== International players ==
- Ben Johnston (England)
- Chris Bentley (England Under 21)
- Andy Maxwell (England)
- Gavin Kerr (Scotland)
- Shaun Woof (England Under 21)
- Gavin Woods (England Counties)
- Stuart Turner (England)
- Sam Dickinson (England Saxons)
- Elliot Gourlay (Scotland Under 20)
- (Wales) Rhys Björn Hayes (Sweden Rugby)
- Andy Darlington (Netherlands)
- Will Robinson (Scotland Under 21)
