= North East 1 =

English rugby union league

- Sport: Rugby Union
- Instituted: 1987; 39 years ago
- Ceased: 2000; 26 years ago
- Country: England
- Website: clubs.rfu.com

North East 1 was an English Rugby Union league which was at the 7th tier of the domestic competition and was available to teams in North East England. Promoted teams moved up to North 2 East while relegated teams dropped to North East 2. The division was abolished at the end of the 1999–2000 season due to RFU restructuring with teams either being moved up to North 2 East or dropping down to regional leagues such as Yorkshire 1 or Durham/Northumberland 1.

As a result of the RFU introducing the Courage League Division 5, between 1994 and 1996, some teams from North East 1 was merged with some teams from North West 1, taking the name North Division 2. However, North East 1 remained as a league, but one rung further down the ladder. Rather confusingly during this spell North Division 2 became North Division 1 and North Division 1 became National Division 5 North. The cancellation of Courage League Division 5 in 1996 would see the league names revert once again.

== Original teams ==
When league rugby began in 1987 this division contained the following teams:

- Blaydon
- Gateshead Fell
- Keighley
- Morpeth
- Old Brodleians (website)
- Old Crossleyans
- Ripon
- Rotherham
- Thornensians
- Westoe
- Wharfedale

== North East 1 Honours ==
=== North East 1 (1987–1993) ===
The original North East 1 was a tier 7 league with promotion up to North Division 2 and relegation down to North East 2.

North East 1 Honours
Season	No of Teams	Champions	Runners–up	Relegated Teams
1987–88	11	Wharfedale	Rotherham	Ripon
1988–89	11	Rotherham	Stockton	Westoe
1989–90	11	Stockton	Gateshead Fell	Selby
1990–91	11	Old Crossleyans	Keighley	Thornesians
1991–92	11	York	West Park Bramhope	No relegation (Note: There was no relegation at the end of 1991–92 season due to the restructuring of the northern leagues by the RFU for the following season, which would see North East 1 expand from 11 to 13 teams.)
1992–93	13	Bridlington	Blaydon	Bramley
Green backgrounds are promotion places.

=== North East 1 (1993–1996) ===
The creation of National 5 North for the 1993–94 season meant that North East 1 dropped from being a tier 7 league to a tier 8 league for the years that National 5 North was active.

North East 1 Honours
Season	No of Teams	Champions	Runners–up	Relegated Teams
1993–94	13	Doncaster	Driffield	Novocastrians
1994–95	13	Blaydon	Horden	Thornensians
1995–96	13	Driffield	Old Brodleians	Redcar, Roundhegians, North Ribblesdale, Selby, Cleckheaton, Ashington (Note: Due to restructuring six clubs were relegated into North East 2 in order to inaugurate North East 3 the following season.)
Green backgrounds are promotion places.

=== North East 1 (1996–2000) ===
The cancellation of National 5 North at the end of the 1995–96 season meant that North East 1 reverted to being a tier 7 league. At the end of the 1999–00 season a further restructure of the leagues saw North East 1, North East 2 and North East 3 cancelled, along with their counterparts North West 1, North West 2 and North West 3.

North East 1 Honours
Season	No of Teams	Champions	Runners–up	Relegated Teams
1996–97	10	Morpeth	Old Crossleyans	Keighley, Hartlepool Rovers
1997–98	10	Percy Park	Old Crossleyans	Gateshead Fell, Wheatley Hills
1998–99	10	Darlington Mowden Park	Halifax	Durham City, Old Brodleians, Pontefract
1999–00	10	Halifax	Darlington (Note: As well as the champions and runners up, five other teams were also promoted. This was because the North East 1 division was to be abolished and the majority of teams would be promoted to North 2 East.)	Keighley, Horden, Percy Park (Note: As North East 2 was to be abolished along with North East 1, Keighley would be transferred to Yorkshire 1 while Horden and Percy Park would be transferred to Durham/Northumberland 1.)
Green backgrounds are promotion places.

== Number of league titles ==
- Bridlington (1)
- Blaydon (1)
- Darlington Mowden Park (1)
- Doncaster (1)
- Driffield (1)
- Morpeth (1)
- Halifax (1)
- Stockton (1)
- Rotherham (1)
- Old Crossleyans (1)
- Percy Park (1)
- Wharfedale (1)
- York (1)

== See also ==
- English Rugby Union Leagues
- English rugby union system
- Rugby union in England
