= North East 2 =

Defunct English rugby union league

- Sport: Rugby Union
- Instituted: 1987; 39 years ago
- Ceased: 2000; 26 years ago
- Country: England
- Website: clubs.rfu.com

North East 2 was an English Rugby Union league was at the eighth tier of the domestic competition when it was founded in 1987 and was available to teams in North East England. Promoted teams moved up to North East 1 while relegated teams dropped to Durham/Northumberland 1 and latterly North East 3. The division was abolished at the end of the 1999–2000 season due to RFU restructuring with teams being transferred to regional leagues such as Yorkshire 1 or Durham/Northumberland 1.

== Original teams ==
When league rugby began in 1987 this division contained the following teams:

- Barnsley
- Beverley
- Novocastrians
- Newcastle University
- Old Hymerians
- Pocklington
- Pontefract
- Ryton
- Selby
- Stockton
- York

== North East 2 honours ==
=== North East 2 (1987–1993) ===
The original North East 2 was a tier 8 league with promotion up to North East 1 and relegation down to either Durham/Northumberland 1 or Yorkshire 1.

North East 2 Honours
Season	No of Teams	Champions	Runners–up	Relegated Teams
1987–88	11	Novocastrians	Stockton	Barnsley
1988–89	11	York	Selby	Pocklington
1989–90	11	Bramley	Roundhegians	Ryton
1990–91	10	West Park Bramhope	Pontefract	No relegation
1991–92	11	Bridlington	Selby (Note: Runners up Selby along with Thornensians and Redcar were promoted to North East 1.)	No relegation (Note: Due to restructuring no clubs were relegated into Durham/Northumberland 1 as three clubs were promoted into North East 2.)
1992–93	13	Doncaster	Driffield	Bishop Auckland
Green backgrounds are promotion places.

=== North East 2 (1993–1996) ===
The creation of National 5 North for the 1993–94 season meant that North East 2 dropped from being a tier 8 league to a tier 9 league for the years that National 5 North was active.

North East 2 Honours
Season	No of Teams	Champions	Runners–up	Relegated Teams
1993–94	13	Horden	Cleckheaton	Acklam
1994–95	13	Ashington	North Ribblesdale	Novocastrians
1995–96	13	Wheatley Hills	Percy Park	Bramley, Ripon, Thornensians, Rockcliff, Hull, Blyth, Whitby (Note: Due to restructuring of leagues, seven clubs were relegated into North East 3 in order to inaugurate the league for the following season.)
Green backgrounds are promotion places.

=== North East 2 (1996–2000) ===
The cancellation of National 5 North at the end of the 1995–96 season meant that North East 2 reverted to being a tier 8 league. Additionally, the creation of North East 3 at tier 9 for the 1996–97, meant that relegated teams dropped to this new league. At the end of the 1999–00 season a further restructure of the leagues saw North East 1, North East 2 and North East 3 cancelled, along with their counterparts North West 1, North West 2 and North West 3.

North East 2 Honours
Season	No of Teams	Champions	Runners–up	Relegated Teams
1996–97	10	Beverley	Goole	Redcar, Selby
1997–98	10	Darlington Mowden Park	Keighley	South Shields Westoe, Ashington
1998–99	10	Darlington	Redcar	Gateshead, Roundhegians, Hartlepool Rovers
1999–00	10	Pocklington (Note: As North East 1 was to be abolished Pocklington would instead transfer to Yorkshire 1.)	Cleckheaton (Note: Runners up Cleckheaton along with Wheatley Hills, Selby, Pontefract, Hull, North Ribblesdale and Old Brodleians would transfer to Yorkshire 1 for the following season. West Hartlepool T.D.S.O.B. and Durham City would transfer to Durham/Northumberland 1.)	No relegation (Note: Due to the cancellation of North East 1, 2 and 3 there would be no relegation.)
Green backgrounds are promotion places.

== Number of league titles ==
- Ashington (1)
- Beverley (1)
- Bramley (1)
- Bridlington (1)
- Darlington (1)
- Darlington Mowden Park (1)
- Doncaster (1)
- Horden (1)
- Novocastrians (1)
- Pocklington (1)
- West Park Bramhope (1)
- Wheatley Hills (1)
- York (1)

== See also ==
- English rugby union system
- Rugby union in England
