= Counties 1 Yorkshire =

English rugby union division

- Current season or competition: 2025–26 Counties 1 Yorkshire
- Sport: Rugby union
- Instituted: 1987; 39 years ago
- Number of teams: 12
- Country: England
- Holders: North Ribblesdale (2024–25)
- Most titles: Bridlington (Note: Twice by their 1st XV and the third by the 2nd XV (Bridlington Mariners)) (3 titles)
- Website: Website
- Related competition: Counties 1 Durham & Northumberland
- Promotion to: Regional 2 North West and Regional 2 North East
- Relegation to: Counties 2 Yorkshire

Counties 1 Yorkshire is an English rugby union division, the seventh tier of the domestic competition, and the top level for local rugby union in parts of Yorkshire. The champions are automatically promoted to Regional 2 North East (formerly North 1 East), a division with a wider geographical area that also encompasses northeast England. The bottom two clubs are relegated to Counties 2 Yorkshire. The current champions are North Ribblesdale who are promoted to Regional 2 North West

== Format ==
The first-placed team (and sometimes the runner-up) is promoted to Regional 2 North West or Regional 2 North East depending on geographical location. One, two or three teams are relegated to Counties 2 Yorkshire; numbers depending on feedback following promotion and relegation in the leagues above.

The season runs from September to April and comprises twenty-two rounds of matches, with each club playing each of its rivals, home and away. The results of the matches contribute points to the league as follows:

- 4 points are awarded for a win
- 2 points are awarded for a draw
- 0 points are awarded for a loss, however
- 1 losing (bonus) point is awarded to a team that loses a match by 7 points or fewer
- 1 additional (bonus) point is awarded to a team scoring 4 tries or more in a match.

== 2026–27 ==
Departing were Wath-upon-Dearne (champions) and Dinnington (runners-up) promoted to Regional 2 North East while Beverley (11th) and Leodiensian (12th) were relegated to Counties 2 Yorkshire A and Counties 2 Yorkshire B respectively.

Team	Ground	Capacity	City/Area	Previous season
Bridlington	Dukes Park		Bridlington, East Riding of Yorkshire	Promoted from Counties 2 Yorkshire
Doncaster Phoenix	Castle Park	5,000	Doncaster, South Yorkshire	Relegated from Regional 2 North East (12th)
Goole	Westfield Banks		Goole, East Riding of Yorkshire	3rd
Harrogate Pythons	The Jim Saynor Ground		Harrogate, North Yorkshire,	9th
Hullensians	Springhead Lane		Kingston upon Hull, East Riding of Yorkshire	10th
Keighley	Rose Cottage		Keighley, West Yorkshire	6th
Old Crossleyans	Broomfield Avenue		Halifax, West Yorkshire	Relegated from Regional 2 North East (11th)
Old Otliensians	Chaffers Field		Otley, West Yorkshire	Promoted from Counties 2 Yorkshire
Old Rishworthians	Hollas Lane		Copley, Halifax, West Yorkshire	8th
Wensleydale	Cawkill Park		Leyburn, North Yorkshire	7th
West Leeds	Bluehill Lane		Wortley, Leeds, West Yorkshire	5th
Yarnbury	Brownberrie Lane		Horsforth, Leeds, West Yorkshire	4th

Locations of the 2026–27 Counties 1 Yorkshire teams

== 2025–26 ==
=== Participating teams and location ===
Departing were North Ribblesdale (champions) and Pocklington (runners-up), promoted to Regional 2 North West and Regional 2 North East respectively. Bridlington were relegated to Counties 2 Yorkshire.

Team	Ground	Capacity	City/Area	Previous season
Beverley	Beaver Park		Beverley, East Riding of Yorkshire	5th
Dinnington	Lodge Lane		Dinnington, South Yorkshire, Sheffield	Promoted from Counties 2 Yorkshire (runners up)
Goole	Westfield Banks		Goole, East Riding of Yorkshire	Relegated from Regional 2 North East (12th)
Harrogate Pythons	The Jim Saynor Ground		Harrogate, North Yorkshire,	8th
Hullensians	Springhead Lane		Kingston upon Hull, East Riding of Yorkshire	3rd
Keighley	Rose Cottage		Keighley, West Yorkshire	4th
Leodiensian	Crag Lane		Alwoodley, Leeds, West Yorkshire	11th
North Ribblesdale	Grove Park		Settle, North Yorkshire	
Old Rishworthians	Hollas Lane		Copley, Halifax, West Yorkshire	10th
Wath-upon-Dearne	Moor Road		Wath-upon-Dearne, South Yorkshire	champions
Wensleydale	Cawkill Park		Leyburn, North Yorkshire	7th
West Leeds	Bluehill Lane		Wortley, Leeds, West Yorkshire	9th
Yarnbury	Brownberrie Lane		Horsforth, Leeds, West Yorkshire	Promoted from Counties 2 Yorkshire (runners-up)

Locations of the 2025–26 Counties 1 Yorkshire teams

== 2024–25 ==
=== Participating teams and location ===
Departing were Bradford Salem and Wetherby, both promoted to Regional 2 North East while Bradford & Bingley were relegated to Counties 2 Yorkshire.

Team	Ground	Capacity	City/Area	Previous season
Beverley	Beaver Park		Beverley, East Riding of Yorkshire	8th
Bridlington	Dukes Park		Bridlington, East Riding of Yorkshire	Relegated from Regional 2NE (13th)
Harrogate Pythons	The Jim Saynor Ground		Harrogate, North Yorkshire,	11th
Hullensians	Springhead Lane		Kingston upon Hull, East Riding of Yorkshire	10th
Keighley	Rose Cottage		Keighley, West Yorkshire	3rd
Leodiensian	Crag Lane		Alwoodley, Leeds, West Yorkshire	7th
North Ribblesdale	Grove Park		Settle, North Yorkshire	Promoted from Counties 2 Yorkshire (champions)
Old Rishworthians	Hollas Lane		Copley, Halifax, West Yorkshire	9th
Pocklington	Percy Road		Pocklington, East Riding of Yorkshire	4th
Wath-upon-Dearne	Moor Road		Wath-upon-Dearne, South Yorkshire	Promoted from Counties 2 Yorkshire (2nd)
Wensleydale	Cawkill Park		Leyburn, North Yorkshire	6th
West Leeds	Bluehill Lane		Wortley, Leeds, West Yorkshire	5th

Locations of the 2024–25 Counties 1 Yorkshire teams

=== League table ===
2024–25 Counties 1 Yorkshire
		Played	Won	Drawn	Lost	Points for	Points against	Points diff	Try bonus	Loss bonus	Points	Pts adj
1	North Ribblesdale (P)	22	22	0	0	1046	333	713	19	0	107	
2	Pocklington (P)	22	20	0	2	890	302	588	16	1	97	
3	Hullensians	22	16	0	6	696	467	229	15	2	83	−2
4	Keighley	22	14	0	8	778	456	322	13	5	74	
5	Beverley	22	13	0	9	657	533	124	12	4	68	
6	Wath-upon-Dearne	22	10	0	12	454	563	−109	7	2	50	+1
7	Wensleydale	22	9	0	13	454	563	−109	11	1	43	−5
8	Harrogate Pythons	22	8	0	14	486	759	−273	8	1	41	
9	West Leeds	22	7	0	15	486	786	−300	6	1	35	
10	Old Rishworthians	22	5	0	17	407	728	−321	7	4	31	
11	Leodiensian	22	5	0	17	397	730	−333	4	3	27	
12	Bridlington (R)	22	3	0	19	370	901	−531	5	1	13	−5
If teams are level at any stage, tiebreakers are applied in the following order: 1. Number of matches won 2. Difference between points for and against 3. Total number of points for 4. Aggregate number of points scored in matches between tied teams 5. Number of matches won excluding the first match, then the second and so on until the tie is settled
Green background is the promotion place Pink background are the relegation places Updated: 28 November 2025

== 2023–24 ==
=== Participating teams and location ===
Departing were Goole, promoted to Regional 2 North East. Also leaving were Huddersfield Laund Hill (10th), Dinnington (11th) and Roundhegians (12th) all relegated to Counties 2 Yorkshire.

Team	Ground	Capacity	City/Area	Previous season
Beverley	Beaver Park		Beverley, East Riding of Yorkshire	3rd
Bradford & Bingley	Wagon Lane	4,000	Bingley, West Yorkshire	Relegated from Regional 2 NE (12th)
Bradford Salem	Shay Lane		Heaton, Bradford, West Yorkshire	6th
Harrogate Pythons	The Jim Saynor Ground		Harrogate, North Yorkshire,	Promoted from Counties 2 Yorkshire (2nd)
Hullensians	Springhead Lane		Kingston upon Hull, East Riding of Yorkshire	7th
Keighley	Rose Cottage		Keighley, West Yorkshire	2nd
Leodiensian	Crag Lane		Alwoodley, Leeds, West Yorkshire	9th
Old Rishworthians	Hollas Lane		Copley, Halifax, West Yorkshire	5th
Pocklington	Percy Road		Pocklington, East Riding of Yorkshire	Relegated from Regional 2 NE (11th)
Wensleydale	Cawkill Park		Leyburn, North Yorkshire	Promoted from Counties 2 Yorkshire (champions)
West Leeds	Bluehill Lane		Wortley, Leeds, West Yorkshire	8th
Wetherby	Grange Park		Wetherby, West Yorkshire	4th

Locations of the 2023–24 Counties 1 Yorkshire teams in Leeds & Bradford
Locations of the 2023–24 Counties 1 Yorkshire teams

=== League table ===
2023–24 Counties 1 Yorkshire
		Played	Won	Drawn	Lost	Points for	Points against	Points diff	Try bonus	Loss bonus	Points	Pts adj
1	Bradford Salem (P)	22	19	0	3	638	349	289	12	0	89	+1
2	Wetherby (P)	22	18	0	4	681	392	289	13	3	88	
3	Keighley	22	17	0	5	625	346	279	12	3	83	
4	Pocklington	22	15	0	7	545	381	164	8	2	70	
5	West Leeds	22	13	0	9	562	451	111	7	4	63	
6	Wensleydale	22	10	0	12	457	510	−53	5	5	50	
7	Leodiensian	22	9	1	12	458	513	−55	7	4	49	
8	Beverley	22	8	3	11	451	497	−46	9	5	45	−7
9	Old Rishworthians	22	7	1	14	546	600	−54	9	5	42	−2
10	Hullensians	22	6	0	16	527	618	−91	7	9	40	
11	Harrogate Pythons	22	3	1	18	422	773	−351	5	5	24	
12	Bradford & Bingley (R)	22	4	0	18	352	834	−482	2	2	20	
If teams are level at any stage, tiebreakers are applied in the following order: 1. Number of matches won 2. Difference between points for and against 3. Total number of points for 4. Aggregate number of points scored in matches between tied teams 5. Number of matches won excluding the first match, then the second and so on until the tie is settled
Green background is the promotion place Pink background are the relegation places Updated: 27 November 2025

== 2022–23 ==
=== Participating teams and location ===
This was the first season following the RFU Adult Competition Review. The league was substantially similar to Yorkshire 1 with the nine lowest ranked teams returning and supplemented by the top three from Yorkshire 2. Leaving were champions Middlesbrough 'promoted' to Regional 2 North whilst 2nd to 5th place teams (Pontefract, Old Crossleyans, Bridlington & Selby) were 'promoted' to Regional 2 North East). With five departing but only three arriving the league was reduced from 14 teams to 12.

Team	Ground	Capacity	City/Area	Previous season
Beverley	Beaver Park		Beverley, East Riding of Yorkshire	10th Yorkshire 1
Bradford Salem	Shay Lane		Heaton, Bradford, West Yorkshire	13th Yorkshire 1
Dinnington	Lodge Lane		Dinnington, South Yorkshire	8th Yorkshire 1
Goole	Westfield Banks		Goole, East Riding of Yorkshire	7th Yorkshire 1
Huddersfield Laund Hill	Laund Hill Stadium		Nettleton_Hill, Huddersfield, West Yorkshire	14th Yorkshire 1
Hullensians	Springhead Lane		Kingston upon Hull, East Riding of Yorkshire	Promoted from Yorkshire 2 (3rd)
Keighley	Rose Cottage		Keighley, West Yorkshire	Promoted from Yorkshire 2 (champions)
Leodiensian	Crag Lane		Alwoodley, Leeds, West Yorkshire	12th Yorkshire 1
Old Rishworthians	Hollas Lane		Copley, Halifax, West Yorkshire	9th Yorkshire 1
Roundhegians	The Memorial Groun		Roundhay, Leeds, West Yorkshire	11th Yorkshire 1
West Leeds	Bluehill Lane		Wortley, Leeds, West Yorkshire	6th Yorkshire 1
Wetherby	Grange Park		Wetherby, West Yorkshire	Promoted from Yorkshire 2 (2nd)

Locations of the 2022–23 Counties 1 Yorkshire teams in Leeds
Locations of the 2022–23 Counties 1 Yorkshire teams

=== League table ===
2022–23 Counties 1 Yorkshire
		Played	Won	Drawn	Lost	Points for	Points against	Points diff	Try bonus	Loss bonus	Points	Pts adj
1	Goole (P)	22	20	0	2	765	244	521	16	2	98	
2	Keighley	22	15	3	4	651	344	307	9	1	76	
3	Beverley	22	14	0	8	758	550	208	12	2	70	
4	Wetherby	22	14	1	7	570	378	192	12	3	68	−5
5	Old Rishworthians	22	12	0	10	608	459	149	12	5	65	
6	Bradford Salem	22	11	2	9	601	423	178	7	5	60	
7	Hullensians	22	10	1	11	525	560	−35	9	2	53	
8	West Leeds	22	9	2	11	515	577	−62	8	3	51	
9	Leodiensian	22	8	1	13	411	588	−177	7	1	42	
10	Huddersfield Laund Hill (R)	22	6	2	14	476	667	−191	7	5	40	
11	Dinnington (R)	22	5	0	17	320	994	−674	4	2	26	
12	Roundhegians (R)	22	2	0	20	417	833	−416	5	7	20	
If teams are level at any stage, tiebreakers are applied in the following order: 1. Number of matches won 2. Difference between points for and against 3. Total number of points for 4. Aggregate number of points scored in matches between tied teams 5. Number of matches won excluding the first match, then the second and so on until the tie is settled
Green background is the promotion place Pink background are the relegation places Updated: 24 November 2025

== 2021–22 ==
=== Participating teams and location ===
The teams competing in 2021–22 achieved their places in the league based on performances in 2019–20, the 'previous season' column in the table below refers to that season not 2020-21.

Team	Ground	Capacity	City/Area	Previous season
Beverley	Beaver Park		Beverley, East Riding of Yorkshire	3rd
Bradford Salem	Shay Lane		Heaton, Bradford, West Yorkshire	8th
Bridlington	Dukes Park		Bridlington, East Riding of Yorkshire	11th
Dinnington	Lodge Lane		Dinnington, South Yorkshire	9th
Goole	Westfield Banks		Goole, East Riding of Yorkshire	6th
Huddersfield Laund Hill	Laund Hill Stadium		Nettleton_Hill, Huddersfield, West Yorkshire	Relegated from North 1 East (14th)
Leodiensian	Crag Lane		Alwoodley, Leeds, West Yorkshire	10th
Middlesbrough	Acklam Park	5,000 (159 seats)	Acklam, Middlesbrough, North Yorkshire	Level Transfer from DN1 (2nd)
Old Crossleyans	Broomfield Avenue		Halifax, West Yorkshire	4th
Old Rishworthians	Hollas Lane		Copley, Halifax, West Yorkshire	Promoted from Yorkshire 2 (runners up)
Pontefract	Moor Lane		Pontefract, West Yorkshire	12th
Roundhegians	The Memorial Groun		Roundhay, Leeds, West Yorkshire	Promoted from Yorkshire 2 (champions)
Selby	Sandhill Lane		Selby, North Yorkshire	7th
West Leeds	Bluehill Lane		Wortley, Leeds, West Yorkshire	5th

Locations of the 2021–22 Yorkshire 1 teams in Leeds
Locations of the 2021–22 Yorkshire 1 teams

== 2020–21 ==
On 30 October 2020 the RFU announced that due to the coronavirus pandemic a decision had been taken to cancel Adult Competitive Leagues (National League 1 and below) for the 2020–21 season meaning Yorkshire 1 was not contested.

== 2019–20 ==
=== Participating teams and location ===
Team	Ground	Capacity	City/Area	Previous season
Beverley	Beaver Park		Beverley, East Riding of Yorkshire	5th
Bradford Salem	Shay Lane		Heaton, Bradford, West Yorkshire	9th
Bridlington	Dukes Park		Bridlington, East Riding of Yorkshire	Relegated from North 1 East (12th)
Dinnington	Lodge Lane		Dinnington, South Yorkshire	6th
Goole	Westfield Banks		Goole, East Riding of Yorkshire	Promoted from Yorkshire 2 (champions)
Heath	West Vale		West Vale, Halifax, West Yorkshire	2nd (lost play-off)
Hullensians	Springhead Lane		Kingston upon Hull, East Riding of Yorkshire	12th
Keighley	Rose Cottage		Keighley, West Yorkshire	10th
Leodiensian	Crag Lane		Alwoodley, Leeds, West Yorkshire	Promoted from Yorkshire 2 (2nd)
Old Brodleians	Woodhead		Hipperholme, Halifax, West Yorkshire	7th
Old Crossleyans	Broomfield Avenue		Halifax, West Yorkshire	4th
Pontefract	Moor Lane		Pontefract, West Yorkshire	3rd
Selby	Sandhill Lane		Selby, North Yorkshire	11th
West Leeds	Bluehill Lane		Wortley, Leeds, West Yorkshire	Relegated from North 1 East (13th)

Locations of the 2019–20 Yorkshire 1 teams

== 2018–19 ==
=== Participating teams and location ===
Team	Ground	Capacity	City/Area	Previous season
Beverley	Beaver Park		Beverley, East Riding of Yorkshire	4th
Bradford Salem	Shay Lane		Heaton, Bradford, West Yorkshire	11th
Dinnington	Lodge Lane		Dinnington, South Yorkshire	Relegated from North 1 East (12th)
Guisborough	Belmangate		Guisborough, North Yorkshire	Level transfer from Durham/Northumberland 1 (10th)
Heath	West Vale		West Vale, Halifax, West Yorkshire	5th
Hullensians	Springhead Lane		Kingston upon Hull, East Riding of Yorkshire	10th
Keighley	Rose Cottage		Keighley, West Yorkshire	9th
Middlesbrough	Acklam Park	5,000 (159 seats)	Acklam, Middlesbrough, North Yorkshire	3rd
Moortown	Moss Valley		Alwoodley, Leeds, West Yorkshire	7th
Old Brodleians	Woodhead		Hipperholme, Halifax, West Yorkshire	8th
Old Crossleyans	Broomfield Avenue		Halifax, West Yorkshire	Promoted from Yorkshire 2 (2nd)
Old Rishworthians	Hollas Lane		Copley, Halifax, West Yorkshire	6th
Pontefract	Moor Lane		Pontefract, West Yorkshire	Promoted from Yorkshire 2 (champions)
Selby	Sandhill Lane		Selby, North Yorkshire	12th

Locations of the 2018–19 Yorkshire 1 teams

== 2017–18 ==
=== Participating teams and location ===
Team	Ground	Capacity	City/Area	Previous season
Beverley	Beaver Park		Beverley, East Riding of Yorkshire	5th
Bradford Salem	Shay Lane		Heaton, Bradford, West Yorkshire	8th
Heath	West Vale		West Vale, Halifax, West Yorkshire	9th
Hullensians	Springhead Lane		Kingston upon Hull, East Riding of Yorkshire	10th
Keighley	Rose Cottage		Keighley, West Yorkshire	7th
Middlesbrough	Acklam Park	5,000 (159 seats)	Acklam, Middlesbrough, North Yorkshire	Level transfer from Durham/Northumberland 1
Moortown	Moss Valley		Alwoodley, Leeds, West Yorkshire	Promoted from Yorkshire 2 (champions)
North Ribblesdale	Grove Park		Settle, North Yorkshire	12th
Old Brodleians	Woodhead		Hipperholme, Halifax, West Yorkshire	6th
Old Rishworthians	Hollas Lane		Copley, Halifax, West Yorkshire	Promoted from Yorkshire 2 (2nd)
Scarborough	Silver Royd	1,950 (322 seats)	Scalby, Scarborough, North Yorkshire	4th
Selby	Sandhill Lane		Selby, North Yorkshire	11th
Wheatley Hills	Brunnel Road		Doncaster, South Yorkshire	Relegated from North 1 East (14th)
York	Clifton Park		York, North Yorkshire	3rd

Locations of the 2017–18 Yorkshire 1 teams

== 2016–17 ==
=== Participating teams and location ===
- Acklam (transferred from Durham/Northumberland 1)
- Beverley (relegated from North 1 East)
- Bradford Salem
- Bridlington
- Heath
- Hullensians
- Keighley (promoted from Yorkshire 2)
- North Ribblesdale
- Old Brodleians
- Scarborough
- Selby
- West Leeds (promoted from Yorkshire 2)
- Yarnbury
- York
Locations of the 2016–17 Yorkshire 1 teams

== 2015–16 ==
=== Participating teams and location ===
Locations of the 2015–16 Yorkshire 1 teams

Team	Ground	Capacity	City/Area	Previous season
Bradford & Bingley	Wagon Lane	4,000	Bingley, West Yorkshire	
Bradford Salem	Shay Lane		Heaton, Bradford, West Yorkshire	
Bridlington	Dukes Park		Bridlington, East Riding of Yorkshire	
Heath	West Vale		Greetland, Halifax, West Yorkshire	
Hullensians	Springhead Lane		Kingston upon Hull, East Riding of Yorkshire	
Malton & Norton	The Gannock		Malton, North Yorkshire	
North Ribblesdale	Grove Park		Settle, North Yorkshire	
Old Brodleians	Woodhead		Hipperholme, West Yorkshire	
Old Crossleyans	Broomfield Avenue		Halifax, West Yorkshire	
Scarborough	Silver Royd	4500 (322 seats)	Scalby, Scarborough, North Yorkshire	
Selby	Sandhill Lane		Selby, North Yorkshire	
West Park Leeds	The Sycamores		Leeds, West Yorkshire	
Yarnbury	Brownberrie Lane		Horsforth, West Yorkshire	
York	Clifton Park		York, North Yorkshire	

== 2014–15 ==
- Bridlington
- Doncaster Phoenix
- Heath
- Hullensians (promoted from Yorkshire 2)
- Malton & Norton (relegated from North 1 East)
- Middlesbrough (relegated from North 1 East)
- North Ribblesdale
- Old Brodleians
- Pontefract
- Scarborough
- Selby
- Wath Upon Dearne
- Yarnbury (promoted from Yorkshire 2)
- York

== 2013–14 ==
- Acklam
- Bridlington
- Dinnington
- Doncaster Phoenix (promoted from Yorkshire 2)
- Heath
- Ilkley
- Keighley (relegated from North 1 East)
- North Ribblesdale
- Old Brodleians
- Pontefract
- Scarborough
- Selby (promoted from Yorkshire 2)
- Wath Upon Dearne
- York

== 2012–13 ==
- Barnsley
- Bridlington
- Dinnington
- Driffield
- Heath
- Huddersfield YMCA
- Ilkley
- Knottingley
- North Ribblesdale
- Old Brodleians
- Pontefract
- Scarborough
- Wath Upon Dearne
- York

== Original teams ==
When league rugby began in 1987 this division contained the following teams:

- Bramley
- Castleford
- Cleckheaton
- Driffield
- Goole
- Hemsworth
- Moortown
- Roundhegians
- Scarborough
- West Park Bramhope (Note: West Park Bramhope are currently known as West Park Leeds.)
- York Railway Institute

== Yorkshire 1 honours ==
=== Yorkshire 1 (1987–1993) ===
The original Yorkshire 1 was a tier 9 league with promotion to North East 2 and relegation to Yorkshire 2.

Yorkshire 1
Season	No of teams	Champions	Runners–up	Relegated teams
1987–88	11	Roundhegians	Bramley	Scarborough, York Railway Institute
1988–89	11	Bramley	West Park Bramhope	Moortown, Goole
1989–90	11	West Park Bramhope	Driffield	Huddersfield Y.M.C.A.
1990–91	11	Bridlington	Driffield	Barnsley
1991–92	11	Driffield	Doncaster (Note: 3rd place Cleckheaton were also promoted.)	No relegation (Note: League restructuring, due to the cancellation of Yorkshire 6 ahead of the 1992–93 season, meant there was no relegation and five clubs were promoted from Yorkshire 2.)
1992–93	13	Goole	Bradford Salem	Castleford
Green backgrounds are promotion places.

=== Yorkshire 1 (1993–2000) ===
The creation of National 5 North meant that Yorkshire 1 dropped one tier to become a tier 10 league. A further restructure at the end of the 1995–96 season, which included the cancellation of National 5 North and the addition of North East 3 at tier 9, saw Yorkshire 1 remain at tier 10 with promotion to the new North 3 East league.

Yorkshire 1
Season	No of teams	Champions	Runners–up	Relegated teams	Ref
1993–94	13	North Ribblesdale	Wheatley Hills	York Railway Institute	
1994–95	13	Wheatley Hills	Wath upon Dearne	Hemsworth	
1995–96	13	Pocklington	Old Otliensians	Sheffield Oaks, Halifax Vandals, Barnsley, Castleford (Note: Yorkshire league restructuring due to the reintroduction of Yorkshire 6, ahead of the 1996–97 season, meant that four clubs were relegated to Yorkshire 2.)	
1996–97	10	Yarnbury	Ilkley	Wibsey (Note: Relegated side Wibsey, left the Yorkshire leagues at the end of the season.)	
1997–98	10	Bradford Salem	Northallerton	Moortown	
1998–99	10	Huddersfield Y.M.C.A.	Castleford	Old Otliensians, Malton & Norton, Bramley Phoenix	
1999–00	10	West Leeds	Leodiensian	Thornensians, Hemsworth, Ilkley	
Green backgrounds are promotion places.

=== Yorkshire 1 (2000–2022) ===
Northern league restructuring by the RFU at the end of the 1999–2000 season saw the cancellation of North East 1, North East 2 and North East 3 (tiers 7 to 9). This meant that Yorkshire 1 became a tier 7 league, with promotion to North 2 East (later North 1 East).

Yorkshire 1
Season	No of teams	Champions	Runners–up	Relegated teams	Ref
2000–01	12	Cleckheaton	Wheatley Hills	Ripon, Keighley, Huddersfield Y.M.C.A.	
2001–02	12	Hull	Scarborough	Pocklington, West Park Leeds, Beverley	
2002–03	12	Bridlington Mariners (Note: The Bridlington Mariners are the 2nd XV of Bridlington RUFC.)	York	Sheffield Tigers, North Ribblesdale, Wheatley Hills	
2003–04	12	Malton & Norton	Pontefract	Scarborough, Old Brodleians	
2004–05	12	Beverley	Wheatley Hills	Yarnbury, Dinnington	
2005–06	12	Sheffield Tigers	Old Crossleyans	Goole, Selby	
2006–07	12	Pontefract	York	Wheatley Hills, Old Brodleians	
2007–08	12	Sandal	Ilkley	Redcar, Huddersfield Y.M.C.A.	
2008–09	12	Old Brodleians	Bridlington	Glossop	
2009–10	14	Wheatley Hills	Sheffield	Skipton, Yarnbury	
2010–11	14	Malton & Norton	Sheffield	Bradford Salem, Selby	
2011–12	14	Pocklington	Keighley	Castleford	
2012–13	14	Driffield	Huddersfield Y.M.C.A.	Knottingley, Barnsley	
2013–14	14	Ilkley	Dinnington	Acklam, Keighley	
2014–15	14	Doncaster Phoenix	Malton & Norton	Wath Upon Dearne, Pontefract	
2015–16	14	Bradford & Bingley	Malton & Norton	West Park Leeds, Old Crossleyans	
2016–17	14	Bridlington	West Leeds	Acklam, Yarnbury	
2017–18	14	York	Scarborough	Wheatley Hills, North Ribblesdale	
2018–19	14	Moortown	Heath	Guisborough, Old Rishworthians	
2019–20	14	Old Brodleians	Heath	Hullensians, Keighley	
2020–21	14	Cancelled due to COVID-19 pandemic in the United Kingdom.			
2021–22	14	Middlesbrough	Pontefract	No relegation	
Green backgrounds are promotion places.

=== Counties 1 Yorkshire (2022–present) ===
Counties 1 Yorkshire
Season	No of teams	Champions	Runners–up	Relegated teams	Ref
2022–23	12	Goole	Keighley	Huddersfield Laund Hill (10th), Dinnington (11th) and Roundhegians (12th)	
2023–24	12	Bradford Salem	Weatherby	South Shields Westoe (12th)	
2024–25	12	North Ribblesdale	Pocklington	Bridlington (12th)	
2025–26	12	Wath-upon-dearne	Dinnington	Leodensians (12th)	

== Promotion play-offs ==
Since the 2000–01 season there has been a play-off between the runners-up of Durham/Northumberland 1 and Yorkshire 1 for the third and final promotion place to North 1 East. The team with the superior league record has home advantage in the tie. At the end of the 2019–20 season Yorkshire 1 teams have been the most successful with thirteen wins to the Durham/Northumberland 1 teams six; and the home side have won ten times to the away sides nine.

Durham/Northumberland 1 v Yorkshire 1 promotion play-off results
Season	Home team	Score	Away team	Venue	Ref
2000–01	Wheatley Hills (Y)	21–19	Percy Park (DN)	Brunel Road, Doncaster, South Yorkshire	
2001–02	Ashington (DN)	17–23	Scarborough (Y)	Recreation Ground, Ashington, Northumberland	
2002–03	York (Y)	29–15	Hartlepool Rovers (DN)	Clifton Park, York, North Yorkshire	
2003–04	Alnwick (DN)	25–18	Pontefract (Y)	Greensfield, Alnwick, Northumberland	
2004–05	Durham City (DN)	26–13	Wheatley Hills (Y)	Hollow Drift, Durham, County Durham	
2005–06	Malton & Norton (DN)	19–39	Old Crossleyans (Y)	The Gannock, Malton, North Yorkshire	
2006–07	Sunderland (DN)	16–18	York (Y)	Ashbrooke Sports Club, Ashbrooke, Sunderland, Tyne and Wear	
2007–08	Northern (DN)	24–28	Ilkley (Y)	McCracken Park, Gosforth, Newcastle upon Tyne, Tyne and Wear	
2008–09	Percy Park (DN)	36–3	Bridlington (Y)	Preston Avenue, North Shields, Tyne and Wear	
2009–10	Team Northumbria (DN)	34–13	Sheffield (Y)	Coach Lane Sports Ground, Benton, Newcastle upon Tyne, Tyne and Wear	
2010–11	Darlington (DN)	17–18	Sheffield (Y)	Blackwell Meadows, Darlington, County Durham	
2011–12	Alnwick (DN)	16–18	Keighley (Y)	Greensfield, Alnwick, Northumberland	
2012–13	Huddersfield Y.M.C.A. (Y)	33–12	Guisborough (DN)	Laund Hill, Huddersfield, West Yorkshire	
2013–14	Dinnington (Y)	34–20 (aet)	Guisborough (DN)	Lodge Lane, Dinnington, South Yorkshire	
2014–15	Morpeth (DN)	14–11	Malton & Norton (Y)	Mitford Road, Morpeth, Northumberland	
2015–16	Middlesbrough (DN)	17–25	Malton & Norton (Y)	Acklam Park, Middlesbrough, North Yorkshire	
2016–17	South Shields Westoe (DN)	14–19	West Leeds (Y)	Wood Terrace, South Shields, Tyne and Wear	
2017–18	Durham City (DN)	AWO (Note: Scarborough won by default as Durham City were unable to raise a team.)	Scarborough (Y)	Hollow Drift, Durham, County Durham	
2018–19	West Hartlepool (DN)	24–23	Heath (Y)	Brinkburn, Hartlepool, County Durham	
2019–20	Cancelled due to COVID-19 pandemic in the United Kingdom. Best ranked runner-up – Heath (Y) – promoted instead.				
2020–21	Uncontested due to the coronavirus pandemic				
Green background is the promoted team. DN = Durham/Northumberland 1 and Y = Yorkshire 1

== Number of league titles ==
- Bridlington (2) (Note: Bridlington have actually won Yorkshire 1 three times - twice by their 1st XV, the other by the 2nd XV (Bridlington Mariners).)
- Driffield (2)
- Malton & Norton (2)
- Old Brodleians (2)
- Pocklington (2)
- Wheatley Hills (2)
- Beverley (1)
- Bradford & Bingley (1)
- Bradford Salem (1)
- Bramley (1)
- Bridlington Mariners (1) (Note: Bridlington Mariners are the 2nd XV of Bridlington RUFC.)
- Cleckheaton (1)
- Doncaster Phoenix (1)
- Goole (1)
- Huddersfield Y.M.C.A. (1)
- Hull (1)
- Ilkley (1)
- Moortown (1)
- North Ribblesdale (1)
- Pontefract (1)
- Roundhegians (1)
- Sandal (1)
- Sheffield Tigers (1)
- West Leeds (1) (Note: Not to be confused with West Park Leeds.)
- West Park Bramhope (1) (Note: West Park Bramhope are currently known as West Park Leeds.)
- Yarnbury (1)
- York (1)

== See also ==
- Yorkshire RFU
- English rugby union system
- Rugby union in England
