= North 1 East =

Sixth tier of the English rugby union domestic competition

- Sport: Rugby union
- Instituted: 1987; 39 years ago
- Ceased: 2022; 4 years ago
- Country: England
- Most titles: Bradford & Bingley (3 titles)
- Website: England RFU

North 1 East was a sixth tier league in the English rugby union domestic competition, formed in 1987 using the name North Division 2, involving clubs from the north of the country. There was also a division known as North East 1 that began in 1987 for clubs based in the north-east but this was a seventh (later eighth) tier league. North Division 2 would later split into two regional divisions, known as North 1 East and North 1 West. North 1 East was made up of teams from around the North East and Yorkshire, playing home and away matches throughout a winter season.

The league champions were automatically promoted to the North Premier, whilst the second placed team entered into a play-off match with the second placed team in the equivalent Division North 1 West. The bottom three teams were relegated to either the Counties 1 Yorkshire or the Counties 1 Durham & Northumberland leagues, the seventh tier of the English domestic rugby union competition. Following the play-off game, depending on the result, a team from the division with fifteen teams was transferred to the division with thirteen teams to level up the number of teams in each division.

The league was discontinued in 2022 as part of the Rugby Football Union Adult Competition Review. The majority of the teams in North 1 East formed the new level six Regional 2 North East league, with the remainder moving to Regional 2 North.

== Clubs ==
=== 2021–22 ===
Kendal finished 5th in N1E in 2019-20 but were level transferred to North 1 West for the current season to address an imbalance of teams.

The teams competing in 2021-22 achieved their places in the league based on performances in 2019-20, the 'previous season' column in the table below refers to that season not 2020-21.

Team	Ground	Capacity	City/Area	Previous season
Bradford & Bingley	Wagon Lane	4,000	Bingley, West Yorkshire	10th
Cleckheaton	Moorend		Cleckheaton, West Yorkshire	2nd
Consett	Amethyst Park		Consett, County Durham	Promoted from Durham/Northumberland 1 (champions)
Driffield	Show Ground		Driffield, East Riding of Yorkshire	4th
Durham City	Hollow Drift	3,000 (500 seats)	Durham, County Durham	11th
Heath	West Vale		West Vale, Halifax, West Yorkshire	Promoted from Yorkshire 1 (runners-up)
Ilkley	Stacks Field	2,000 (40 seats)	Ilkley, West Yorkshire	Relegated from North Premier (14th)
Malton & Norton	The Gannock		Malton, North Yorkshire	9th
Moortown	Moss Valley		Alwoodley, Leeds, West Yorkshire	3rd
Morley	Scatcherd Lane	6,000 (1,000 seats)	Morley, West Yorkshire	6th
Morpeth	Grange House Field	1,000	Morpeth, Northumberland	Relegated from North Premier (13th)
Old Brodleians	Woodhead		Hipperholme, Halifax, West Yorkshire	Promoted from Yorkshire 1 (champions)
Pocklington	Percy Road		Pocklington, East Riding of Yorkshire	7th
Scarborough	Silver Royd	4500 (425 seats)	Scalby, Scarborough, North Yorkshire	8th

Locations of the 2021-22 North 1 East 2 teams in Durham and Northumberland
Locations of the 2021–22 North 1 East teams in West Yorkshire, North Yorkshire and the East Riding of Yorkshire

=== 2020–21 ===
On 30 October 2020 the RFU announced that due to the coronavirus pandemic a decision had been taken to cancel all adult competitive leagues (National League 1 and below) for the 2020/21 season, meaning North 1 East was not contested.

=== 2019–20 ===
Team	Ground	Capacity	City/Area	Previous season
Bradford & Bingley	Wagon Lane	4,000	Bingley, West Yorkshire	7th
Cleckheaton	Moorend		Cleckheaton, West Yorkshire	11th
Driffield	Show Ground		Driffield, East Riding of Yorkshire	8th
Durham City	Hollow Drift	3,000 (500 seats)	Durham, County Durham	Promoted from Durham/Northumberland 1 (champions)
Huddersfield Y.M.C.A.	Laund Hill	2,000 (1,000 seats)	Huddersfield, West Yorkshire	4th
Kendal	Mint Bridge Stadium	3,500 (258 seats)	Kendal, Cumbria	Relegated from North Premier (12th)
Malton & Norton	The Gannock		Malton, North Yorkshire	10th
Moortown	Moss Valley		Alwoodley, Leeds, West Yorkshire	Promoted from Yorkshire 1 (champions)
Morley	Scatcherd Lane	6,000 (1,000 seats)	Morley, West Yorkshire	3rd
Percy Park	Preston Avenue		North Shields, Tyne and Wear	5th
Pocklington	Percy Road		Pocklington, East Riding of Yorkshire	9th
Scarborough	Silver Royd	4500 (425 seats)	Scalby, Scarborough, North Yorkshire	Runners up (lost playoff)
West Hartlepool	Brinkburn	2,000 (76 seats)	Hartlepool, County Durham	Promoted from Durham/Northumberland 1 (playoff)
York	Clifton Park		York, North Yorkshire	1st Promoted to North Premier

Locations of the 2019–20 North 1 East teams

=== Original ===
When league rugby began in 1987 this was a single division containing the following teams from the north of England:

- Alnwick
- Aspatria
- Bradford & Bingley
- Davenport (Note: Davenport would be renamed as Stockport RUFC in 1992.)
- Halifax
- Huddersfield
- Lymm
- Manchester
- New Brighton
- Sandal
- Wilmslow

== Division honours ==
=== North Division 2 (1987–1993) ===
The original North Division 2 was a tier 6 league with promotion up to North Division 1 and relegation down to either North East 1 or North West 1.

North Division 2
Season	No of teams	Champions	Runners–up	Relegated teams
1987–88	11	Aspatria	Halifax	Wilmslow, Manchester
1988–89	11	Bradford & Bingley	Middlesbrough	Davenport
1989–90	11	Rotherham	Widnes	No relegation
1990–91	11	Stockton	Sandal	New Brighton
1991–92	11	Wharfedale	Lymm	No relegation
1992–93	13	Manchester	Huddersfield	Sandbach
Green backgrounds are promotion places.

=== North Division 2 (1993–1996) ===
The creation of National 5 North for the 1993–94 season, meant that North Division 2 dropped from being a tier 6 league to a tier 7 league for the years that National 5 North was active.

North Division 2
Season	No of teams	Champions	Runners–up	Relegated teams
1993–94	13	York	West Park Bramhope	Carlise, Wigan, Lymm
1994–95	13	Macclesfield	Bridlington	Northwich
1995–96	13	New Brighton	Sedgley Park	Birkenhead Park, West Park St Helens, Old Crossleyeans, Hartlepool Rovers (Note: The introduction of a number of new leagues in the north for the 1996–97 season meant that more teams than normal were relegated between leagues to populate the new divisions.)
Green backgrounds are promotion places.

=== North Division 2 (1996–2000) ===
The cancellation of National 5 North at the end of the 1995–96 season meant that North Division 2 reverted to being a tier 6 league.

North Division 2
Season	No of teams	Champions	Runners–up	Relegated teams
1996–97	12	Doncaster	Middlesbrough	Durham City
1997–98	12	Northern	Blaydon	Halifax
1998–99	12	Bradford & Bingley	Driffield	York, Percy Park
1999–00	12	Darlington Mowden Park	Chester	No relegation
Green backgrounds are promotion places.

=== North 2 East ===
For the 2000–01 season, North Division 2 was split into two regional divisions - North 2 East and North 2 West. While promotion continued up into North Division 1, the cancellation of the North East 1, North East 2 and North East 3 meant that relegation was now to either Durham/Northumberland 1 or Yorkshire 1.

North 2 East
Season	No of teams	Champions	Runners–up	Relegated Teams
2000–01	12	Halifax	Darlington	York, West Park Leeds
2001–02	12	Cleckheaton	Huddersfield	Bridlington, Old Crossleyans, Northern
2002–03	12	Bradford & Bingley	Sheffield	Goole, Scarborough, Alnwick
2003-04	12	Hull	Middlesbrough	Northern, York, Bridlington
2004–05	12	Westoe	Huddersfield	Horden, Redcar, Malton & Norton
2005-06	12	Penrith	Beverley	Sandal, Stockton, Alnwick
2006–07	12	Middlesbrough	Sheffield Tigers	Horden, Percy Park, Sheffield
2007–08	12	West Hartlepool	Durham City	Aldwinians, York, Hartlepool Rovers
2008–09	12	Penrith	Old Crossleyans	Aspatria
Green backgrounds are promotion places.

=== North 1 East ===
For the 2009–10 season the division would be renamed North 1 East as part of wholesale national restructure of the league system by the RFU leading to mass changes at all levels including in the north.

North 1 East
Season	No of teams	Champions	Runners–up	Relegated Teams
2009–10	14	Billingham	Sandal	Ilkley, Gateshead, Darlington
2010–11	14	West Hartlepool	Percy Park	Hartlepool Rovers, Driffield, Pontefract
2011–12	14	Billingham	Percy Park	Team Northumbria, (Note: Team Northumbria disbanded after relegation. Although they still do participate in the Northumberland Senior Cup.) Gateshead, Old Brodleians
2012–13	14	Beverley	Morley	Darlington, Durham City, Keighley
2013–14	14	Cleckheaton	Huddersfield Y.M.C.A.	Malton & Norton, Middlesbrough, Morpeth
2014–15	14	Ilkley	Sheffield	Horden, Old Crossleyans, Bradford and Bingley
2015–16	14	Doncaster Phoenix	Morley	Beverley, South Shields Westoe, Northern
2016–17	14	Pocklington	Penrith	Wheatley Hills, Guisborough, Durham City
2017–18	14	Alnwick	Driffield	Northern, West Hartlepool, Dinnington
2018–19	14	Morpeth	Scarborough	Consett, West Leeds, Bridlington
2019–20	14	York	Cleckheaton	Huddersfield Y.M.C.A., West Hartlepool, Percy Park
2020–21	Cancelled due to the COVID-19 pandemic in the United Kingdom.			
2021-22	14	Ilkley	Heath	No relegation
Green background are the promotion places.
Green backgrounds are promotion places.

== Promotion play-offs ==
Since the 2000–01 season there has been a play-off between the runners-up of North 1 East and North 1 West for the third and final promotion place to North Premier. The team with the superior league record has home advantage in the tie. At the end of the 2019–20 season the North 1 East have been the most successful with thirteen wins to the North 1 West teams six; and the home team has won promotion on fifteen occasions compared to the away teams five.

North 1 East v North 1 West promotion play-off results
Season	Home team	Score	Away team	Venue	Attendance
2000–01	Darlington (E)	49-0	Aldwinians (W)	Blackwell Meadows, Darlington, County Durham	
2001–02	Huddersfield (E)	26-10	Vale of Lune (W)	Lockwood Park, Huddersfield, West Yorkshire	
2002–03	Sheffield (E)	32-15	Rochdale (W)	Abbeydale Park, Dore, Sheffield, South Yorkshire	
2003–04	Middlesbrough (E)	21-13	Caldy (W)	Acklam Park, Middlesbrough, North Yorkshire	
2004–05	Huddersfield (E)	22-13	Stockport (W)	Lockwood Park, Huddersfield, West Yorkshire	
2005–06	Beverley (E)	21-16	Winnington Park (W)	Beaver Park, Beverley, East Riding of Yorkshire	
2006–07	Sheffield Tigers (E)	50-10	Lymm (W)	Dore Moor, Dore, Sheffield, South Yorkshire	
2007–08	Durham City (E)	13-18	Stockport (W)	Hollow Drift, Durham, County Durham	
2008–09	Old Crossleyans (E)	25-31	Rossendale (W)	Broomfield Avenue, Halifax, West Yorkshire	
2009–10	Sandal (E)	30-22	Northwich (W)	Milnthorpe Green, Sandal Magna, Wakefield, West Yorkshire	
2010–11	Percy Park (E)	26-27	Burnage (W)	Preston Avenue, North Shields, Tyne and Wear	1200
2011–12	Percy Park (E)	18-12	Liverpool St Helens (W)	Preston Avenue, North Shields, Tyne and Wear	800
2012–13	Liverpool St Helens (W)	17-28	Morley (E)	Moss Lane, St Helens, Merseyside	
2013–14	Birkenhead Park (W)	19-29	Huddersfield Y.M.C.A. (E)	Upper Park, Birkenhead, Merseyside	
2014–15	Kirkby Lonsdale (W)	29-35	Sheffield (E)	Underley Park, Kirkby Lonsdale, Cumbria	1,000
2015–16	Kirkby Lonsdale (W)	33-38 (aet)	Morley (E)	Underley Park, Kirkby Lonsdale, Cumbria	
2016–17	Birkenhead Park (W)	29-21	Penrith (E)	Upper Park, Birkenhead, Merseyside	
2017–18	Driffield (E)	21-24	Wilmslow (W)	Show Ground, Driffield, East Riding of Yorkshire	
2018–19	Blackburn (W)	17-7	Scarborough (E)	Ramsgreave Drive, Blackburn, Lancashire	
2019–20	Cancelled due to COVID-19 pandemic in the United Kingdom. Best ranked runner up - Northwich (W) - promoted instead.				
2020–21					
Green background is the promoted team. E = North 1 East (formerly North 2 East) and W = North 1 West (formerly North 2 West)

== Number of league titles ==
- Bradford & Bingley (3) (Note: One of Bradford & Bingley's titles was won when league was a single division known as North Division 2.)
- Billingham (2)
- Cleckheaton (2)
- Ilkley (2)
- Penrith (2)
- West Hartlepool (2)
- Alnwick (1)
- Aspatria (1) (Note: Aspatria's title was won when league was a single division known as North Division 2.)
- Beverley (1)
- Darlington Mowden Park (1)
- Doncaster (1) (Note: Doncaster's title was won when league was a single division known as North Division 2.)
- Doncaster Phoenix (1)
- Halifax (1)
- Hull (1)
- Macclesfield (1) (Note: Manchester's title was won when league was a single division known as North Division 2.)
- Manchester (1) (Note: Manchester's title was won when league was a single division known as North Division 2.)
- Middlesbrough (1)
- Morpeth (1)
- New Brighton (1) (Note: New Brighton's title was won when league was a single division known as North Division 2.)
- Northern (1) (Note: Northern's title was won when league was a single division known as North Division 2.)
- Pocklington (1)
- Rotherham (1) (Note: Rotherham's title was won when league was a single division known as North Division 2.)
- Stockton (1) (Note: Stockton's title was won when league was a single division known as North Division 2.)
- Westoe (1) (Note: Currently known as South Shields Westoe.)
- Wharfedale (1) (Note: Wharfedale's title was won when league was a single division known as North Division 2.)
- York (1) (Note: York's title was won when league was a single division known as North Division 2.)

== See also ==
- Durham RFU
- Northumberland RFU
- Yorkshire RFU
- English rugby union system
- Rugby union in England
