= Regional 2 North East =

Level six rugby union league in England

- Current season or competition: 2025–26 Regional 2 North East
- Sport: Rugby union
- Instituted: 2022
- Number of teams: 12
- Country: England
- Holders: Rochdale (2024–25)
- Most titles: Pontefract, Selby and Rochdale (1 title)
- Website: Northern Division

Regional 2 North East is a level six league in the English rugby union system, with the twelve teams drawn in the main from across Yorkshire with others in Lancashire and Derbyshire. The other level six leagues in the Northern Division are Regional 2 North for teams in North East England and Cumbria; and Regional 2 North West for teams in Lancashire, Greater Manchester and Merseyside. It was created as a product of the 2022 Adult Competition Review.

Rochdale are the current champions and are promoted to Regional 1 North East.

== Structure ==
The league consists of twelve teams who play the others on a home and away basis, to make a total of 22 matches each. The champions are promoted to Regional 1 North East and the bottom two teams are relegated to either, Counties 1 ADM Lancashire & Cheshire or Counties 1 Yorkshire, depending on their location.

The results of the matches contribute points to the league as follows:

- 4 points are awarded for a win
- 2 points are awarded for a draw
- 0 points are awarded for a loss, however
- 1 losing (bonus) point is awarded to a team that loses a match by 7 points or fewer
- 1 additional (bonus) point is awarded to a team scoring 4 tries or more in a match.

== 2026–27 ==
Departing were Scarborough, promoted to Regional 1 North East while Old Crossleyans (11th) and Doncaster Phoenix (12th) were relegated to Counties 1 Yorkshire.

Team	Ground	Capacity	City/Area	Previous season
Bradford Salem	Shay Lane		Heaton, Bradford, West Yorkshire	8th
Cleckheaton	Moorend		Cleckheaton, West Yorkshire	Relegated from Regional 1 North East (12th)
Dinnington	Lodge Lane		Dinnington, South Yorkshire, Sheffield	Promoted from Counties 1 Yorkshire (runners up)
Malton & Norton	The Gannock		Malton, North Yorkshire	7th
Moortown	Moss Valley		Alwoodley, Leeds, West Yorkshire	6th
Morley	Scatcherd Lane	6,000 (1,000 seats)	Morley, West Yorkshire	4th
Old Brodleians	Woodhead		Hipperholme, Halifax, West Yorkshire	3rd
Pocklington	Percy Road		Pocklington, East Riding of Yorkshire	Runners-up
Pontefract	Moor Lane		Pontefract, West Yorkshire	9th
Selby	Sandhill Lane		Selby, North Yorkshire	5th
Wath-upon-Dearne	Moor Road		Wath-upon-Dearne, South Yorkshire	Promoted from Counties 1 Yorkshire (champions)
Wetherby	Grange Park		Wetherby, West Yorkshire	10th

Locations of the 2026-27 Regional 2 North East teams

== 2025–26 ==
Departing were Rochdale, promoted to Regional 1 North West while Goole (12th) were relegated to Counties 1 Yorkshire.

Team	Ground	Capacity	City/Area	Previous season
Bradford Salem	Shay Lane		Heaton, Bradford, West Yorkshire	6th
Doncaster Phoenix	Castle Park	5,000	Doncaster, South Yorkshire	11th
Malton & Norton	The Gannock		Malton, North Yorkshire	8th
Moortown	Moss Valley		Alwoodley, Leeds, West Yorkshire	9th
Morley	Scatcherd Lane	6,000 (1,000 seats)	Morley, West Yorkshire	4th
Old Brodleians	Woodhead		Hipperholme, Halifax, West Yorkshire	5th
Old Crossleyans	Broomfield Avenue		Halifax, West Yorkshire	10th
Pocklington	Percy Road		Pocklington, East Riding of Yorkshire	Promoted from Counties 1 Yorkshire
Pontefract	Moor Lane		Pontefract, West Yorkshire	7th
Scarborough	Silver Royd	4500 (425 seats)	Scalby, Scarborough, North Yorkshire	Runners-up
Selby	Sandhill Lane		Selby, North Yorkshire	Relegated from Regional 1 NE (12th)
Wetherby	Grange Park		Wetherby, West Yorkshire	3rd

Locations of the 2025–26 Regional 2 North East teams

== 2024–25 ==
Eight teams participated in last seasons competition. Departing were Selby, promoted to Regional 1 North East, while Glossop and Bridlington were relegated to Counties 1 ADM Lancashire & Cheshire and Counties 1 Yorkshire respectively. Also departing were Dronfield who moved on a level transfer to Regional 2 Midlands North. Joining were Bradford Salem and Wetherby, promoted from Counties 1 Yorkshire while Doncaster Phoenix and Pontefract were relegated from Regional 1 North East.

Team	Ground	Capacity	City/Area	Previous season
Bradford Salem	Shay Lane		Heaton, Bradford, West Yorkshire	Promoted from Counties 1 Yorkshire (champions)
Doncaster Phoenix	Castle Park	5,000	Doncaster, South Yorkshire	Relegated from Regional 1NE (11th)
Goole	Westfield Banks		Goole, East Riding of Yorkshire	4th
Malton & Norton	The Gannock		Malton, North Yorkshire	5th
Moortown	Moss Valley		Alwoodley, Leeds, West Yorkshire	7th
Morley	Scatcherd Lane	6,000 (1,000 seats)	Morley, West Yorkshire	8th
Old Brodleians	Woodhead		Hipperholme, Halifax, West Yorkshire	3rd
Old Crossleyans	Broomfield Avenue		Halifax, West Yorkshire	10th
Pontefract	Moor Lane		Pontefract, West Yorkshire	Relegated from Regional 1NE (12th)
Rochdale	Moorgate Avenue		Rochdale, Greater Manchester	2nd
Scarborough	Silver Royd	4500 (425 seats)	Scalby, Scarborough, North Yorkshire	9th
Wetherby	Grange Park		Wetherby, West Yorkshire	Promoted from Counties 1 Yorkshire (runners-up)

Locations of the 2024–25 Regional 2 North East teams

=== League table ===
Regional 2 North East 2024–25
	Team	Played	Won	Drawn	Lost	Points for	Points against	Points diff	Try bonus	Loss bonus	Points
1	Rochdale (P)	22	17	0	5	732	476	256	15	4	87
2	Scarborough	22	16	0	6	600	514	86	13	3	80
3	Wetherby	22	15	0	7	617	425	192	13	4	77
4	Morley	22	14	0	8	660	495	165	14	6	76
5	Old Brodleians	22	12	0	10	657	628	29	17	3	68
6	Bradford Salem	22	12	0	10	564	536	28	16	3	67
7	Pontefract	22	12	0	10	523	495	28	11	8	62
8	Malton and Norton	22	10	0	12	588	646	−58	11	2	53
9	Moortown	22	8	0	14	576	688	−112	15	6	53
10	Old Crossleyans	22	7	0	15	424	600	−176	7	6	41
11	Doncaster Knights	22	7	0	15	500	643	−143	6	5	39
12	Goole (R)	22	2	0	20	392	687	−295	5	9	22
If teams are level at any stage, tiebreakers are applied in the following order: 1. Number of matches won 2. Number of draws 3. Difference between points for and against 4. Total number of points for 5. Aggregate number of points scored in matches between tied teams 6. Number of matches won excluding the first match, then the second and so on until the tie is settled
Green background is the promotion place. Pink background are the relegation places. Updated: 24 September 2025; Source:

== 2023–24 ==
Departing were the champions, Pontefract promoted to Regional 1 North East while Pocklington and Bradford & Bingley were relegated to Counties 1 Yorkshire. Joining were Goole, promoted from Counties 1 Yorkshire, and Glossop and Rochdale, both level transferred from Regional 2 North West.

Team	Ground	Capacity	City/Area	Previous season
Bridlington	Dukes Park		Bridlington, East Riding of Yorkshire	4th
Dronfield	Gosforth Fields		Dronfield Woodhouse, Dronfield, Derbyshire	6th
Glossop	Hargate Hill Lane		Charlesworth, Glossop, Derbyshire	Level transfer from Regional 2NW (9th)
Goole	Westfield Banks		Goole, East Riding of Yorkshire	Promoted from Counties 1 Yorkshire (champions)
Malton & Norton	The Gannock		Malton, North Yorkshire	3rd
Moortown	Moss Valley		Alwoodley, Leeds, West Yorkshire	2nd
Morley	Scatcherd Lane	6,000 (1,000 seats)	Morley, West Yorkshire	7th
Old Brodleians	Woodhead		Hipperholme, Halifax, West Yorkshire	8th
Old Crossleyans	Broomfield Avenue		Halifax, West Yorkshire	10th
Rochdale	Moorgate Avenue		Rochdale, Greater Manchester	Level transfer from Regional 2NW (4th)
Scarborough	Silver Royd	4500 (425 seats)	Scalby, Scarborough, North Yorkshire	5th
Selby	Sandhill Lane		Selby, North Yorkshire	9th

Locations of the 2023–24 Regional 2 North East teams

=== League table ===
Regional 2 North East 2023–24
	Team	Played	Won	Drawn	Lost	Points for	Points against	Points diff	Try bonus	Loss bonus	Points	Points deducted
1	Selby (P)	22	17	0	5	693	375	318	16	3	87	0
2	Rochdale	22	16	0	6	657	410	247	13	5	82	0
3	Old Brodleians	22	14	0	8	551	512	39	10	3	69	0
4	Goole	22	13	1	8	529	390	139	11	5	68	0
5	Malton and Norton	22	13	1	8	602	474	128	12	2	68	0
6	Dronfield	22	12	0	10	503	406	97	7	3	58	0
7	Moortown	22	9	2	11	674	571	103	13	5	56	0
8	Morley	22	10	0	12	537	474	63	9	6	55	0
9	Scarborough	22	10	0	12	377	531	−154	5	3	48	0
10	Old Crossleyans	22	8	0	14	508	686	−178	10	3	45	0
11	Bridlington (R)	22	7	0	15	370	593	−223	6	5	40	0
12	Glossop (R)	22	1	0	21	238	817	−579	2	3	4	−5
If teams are level at any stage, tiebreakers are applied in the following order: 1. Number of matches won 2. Number of draws 3. Difference between points for and against 4. Total number of points for 5. Aggregate number of points scored in matches between tied teams 6. Number of matches won excluding the first match, then the second and so on until the tie is settled
Green background is the promotion place. Pink background are the relegation places. Updated: 23 November 2024; Source:

== 2022–23 ==
This was the first season following the Rugby Football Union (RFU) Adult Competition Review. The league had some similarities with North 1 East as seven clubs returned, but was smaller (14 teams reduced to 12) and the Durham RFU and Northumberland RFU clubs were allocated to Regional 2 North. The league was supplemented by four of the top five sides from Yorkshire 1 with the last place taken by Dronfield level transferred from Midlands 1 East.

Team	Ground	Capacity	City/Area	Previous season
Bradford & Bingley	Wagon Lane	4,000	Bingley, West Yorkshire	14th North 1 East
Bridlington	Dukes Park		Bridlington, East Riding of Yorkshire	4th Yorkshire 1
Dronfield	Gosforth Fields		Dronfield Woodhouse, Dronfield, Derbyshire	5th Midlands 1 East
Malton & Norton	The Gannock		Malton, North Yorkshire	9th North 1 East
Moortown	Moss Valley		Alwoodley, Leeds, West Yorkshire	8th North 1 East
Morley	Scatcherd Lane	6,000 (1,000 seats)	Morley, West Yorkshire	11th North 1 East
Old Brodleians	Woodhead		Hipperholme, Halifax, West Yorkshire	5th North 1 East
Old Crossleyans	Broomfield Avenue		Halifax, West Yorkshire	3rd Yorkshire 1
Pocklington	Percy Road		Pocklington, East Riding of Yorkshire	10th North 1 East
Pontefract	Moor Lane		Pontefract, West Yorkshire	2nd Yorkshire 1
Scarborough	Silver Royd	4500 (425 seats)	Scalby, Scarborough, North Yorkshire	7th North 1 East
Selby	Sandhill Lane		Selby, North Yorkshire	5th Yorkshire 1

Locations of the 2022–23 Regional 2 North East teams

=== League table ===
Regional 2 North East 2022–23
	Team	Played	Won	Drawn	Lost	Points for	Points against	Points diff	Try bonus	Loss bonus	Points	Points deducted
1	Pontefract (P)	22	18	0	4	651	309	342	14	4	90	0
2	Moortown	22	18	0	4	885	447	438	15	2	89	0
3	Malton and Norton	22	16	0	6	700	441	259	12	2	78	0
4	Bridlington	22	13	0	9	628	502	126	13	3	68	0
5	Scarborough	22	12	0	10	538	547	−9	10	4	62	0
6	Dronfield	22	10	1	11	567	579	−12	9	4	55	0
7	Morley	22	10	0	12	586	487	99	10	4	54	0
8	Old Brodleians	22	10	1	11	498	603	−105	8	1	51	0
9	Selby	22	9	0	13	485	585	−100	8	3	47	0
10	Old Crossleyans	22	9	0	13	496	610	−114	7	2	45	0
11	Pocklington (R)	22	6	0	16	479	680	−201	7	2	33	0
12	Bradford & Bingley (R)	22	0	0	22	292	1015	−723	2	1	−7	−10
If teams are level at any stage, tiebreakers are applied in the following order: 1. Number of matches won 2. Number of draws 3. Difference between points for and against 4. Total number of points for 5. Aggregate number of points scored in matches between tied teams 6. Number of matches won excluding the first match, then the second and so on until the tie is settled
Green background is the promotion place. Pink background are the relegation places. Updated: 17 November 2024; Source:

== Regional 2 North East (2022– ) ==
League restructuring by the RFU created twelve leagues at level six. The champions are promoted to Regional 1 North East and the bottom sides are relegated to either, Counties 1 ADM Lancashire & Cheshire or Counties 1 Yorkshire, depending on their location.

Regional 2 North East
Season	No of teams	No of matches	Champions	Runners-up	Relegated team(s)	Ref
2022–23	12	22	Pontefract	Moortown	Pocklington and Bradford & Bingley RFC	
2023–24	12	22	Selby	Rochdale	Bridlington and Glossop	
2024–25	12	22	Rochdale	Scarborough	Goole	
Green background is the promotion place.
