= North East 3 =

Defunct English rugby union league

- Sport: Rugby Union
- Instituted: 1996; 30 years ago
- Ceased: 2000; 26 years ago
- Country: England
- Website: clubs.rfu.com

North East 3 was an English Rugby Union league which was at the ninth tier of the domestic competition and was available to teams in North East England. Promoted teams moved up to North East 2 while relegated teams dropped to either Yorkshire 1 or Durham/Northumberland 1 depending on their location.

At the end of the 1999-2000 the division was cancelled along with North East 1, North East 2, and their counterparts North West 1, North West 2 and North West 3, due to northern league restructuring by the RFU. Most teams in North West 3 were transferred to their relevant regional leagues - Yorkshire 1 or Durham/Northumberland 1 - although one side went into Yorkshire 2.

== Original teams ==
When this division was introduced in 1996 it contained the following teams:

- Blyth - relegated from North East 2 (8th)
- Bramley - relegated from North East 2 (13th)
- Darlington - promoted from Durham/Northumberland 1 (champions)
- Hull - relegated from North East 2 (9th)
- Pocklington - promoted from Yorkshire 1 (champions)
- Ripon - relegated from North East 2 (12th)
- Sunderland - promoted from Durham/Northumberland 1 (runners up)
- Thornensians - relegated from North East 2 (11th)
- Whitley Bay Rockcliff - relegated from North East 2 (10th)
- Whitby - relegated from North East 2 (7th)

== North East 3 honours ==
North East 3
| Season | No of Teams | Champions | Runners–up | Relegated Teams |
| 1996–97 | 10 | Darlington | Hull | Blyth, Whitley Bay Rockcliff |
| 1997–98 | 10 | Pocklington | Redcar | Whitby, Bramley Phoenix |
| 1998–99 | 10 | Selby | West Hartlepool T.D.S.O.B. | Thornensians, Sunderland, Bradford Salem |
| 1999–00 | 10 | Westoe (Note: As North East 2 was abolished Westoe instead transferred to Yorkshire 1.) | Yarnbury (Note: Due to the cancellation of North East 1, 2 and 3 runners up Yarnbury, Huddersfield Y.M.C.A. and Ripon were transferred to Yorkshire 1 for the following season. Gateshead, Ryton, Hartlepool Rovers, Ashington and Medicals transferred to Durham/Northumberland 1.) | Roundhegians (Note: Although not relegated in the usual fashion, Roundhegians were the only Yorkshire team to go into Yorkshire 2.) |
Green backgrounds are promotion places.

== Number of league titles ==
- Darlington (1)
- Pocklington (1)
- Selby (1)
- Westoe (1)

== See also ==
- English rugby union system
- Rugby union in England
