= Scarborough RUFC =

English rugby union club

- Full name: Scarborough Rugby Union Football Club
- Union: Yorkshire RFU
- Founded: 1926; 100 years ago
- Location: Scalby, Scarborough, North Yorkshire
- Ground: Silver Royd (Capacity: 4,500 (425 seats))
- Chairman: Mike Holder
- CEO: Graeme Young
- President: Tim Elliott
- Coach: Ben Foden
- Captain: Sam Dawson
- Top scorer: TBC
- League: Regional 2 North East
- 2024-25: 2nd

Official website
- www.scarboroughrugby.co.uk

Scarborough Rugby Union Football Club is an English rugby union club based in Scalby near Scarborough, North Yorkshire. The clubhouse is the UK's largest amateur clubhouse and is set within a 32-acre site with five senior pitches, a training pitch and six minis pitches. The club operates four senior men's teams, a women's team and pre-micro/micro/mini/youth rugby (ages 3–17). The men's 1st XV currently play in Regional 2 North East – a league at level 6 in the English rugby union system – having been promoted from Yorkshire 1 via a play-off at the end of the 2017–18 season.

Following a decision in 2026 to introduce 2XVs into the league structure, Scarborough's 2nd XV entered Counties 3 Yorkshire A division.

== History ==
=== Early years ===
Scarborough RUFC was founded in 1926 following a meeting held at the Pavilion Hotel, and played its first game away to Whitby later that year. As the new club did not have its own ground, home fixtures during the 1926–27 season were played at Seamer Road (Athletic Ground), with rent and a percentage of the gate money paid to the owners, Scarborough Football Club. Rugby Union had not been expected to take off in Scarborough, but by the fourth game the club enjoyed an attendance of over 1,000. In 1927, Scarborough left Seamer Road for new premises at The Old Showground in Newby, which would be its home for the next 82 years.

In 1933 Scarborough reached the final of the Yorkshire Shield for the very first time, losing 6–13 to Sandal at Bridlington. Later in the decade, Dr. I Stevenson (who had been the medical man for the New Zealand All Blacks) became the club's honorary coach, helping it to become one of the strongest clubs in Yorkshire and also producing the club's first England international, Mike Marshall, who would gain six caps for his country prior to World War II (he died during the conflict). During this time the club also installed floodlights enabling evening training sessions. A 300-seater grandstand was erected at the Old Showground, enabling the ground to host Yorkshire county games, and in 1953 the club purchased the former chapel at St Margaret's School for £400 to use as its club-house.

=== League rugby ===
When the leagues were introduced during the 1987–88 season, Scarborough found itself in Yorkshire 1 – a league at the 7th level of the English rugby union system. Despite winning the first fixture 10–6 against Driffield, the rest of the season did not go to plan and Scarborough was relegated to Yorkshire 2 at the end of the season. The club remained in Yorkshire 2 for a decade until it was promoted as champions at the end of the 1998–99 season. That year, Scarborough also reached the semi-finals of the Tetley's Bitter Vase but were denied a Twickenham appearance by eventual winners, Billericay, losing 6–18 away to the south-east club. Promotion from Yorkshire 2 heralded the beginning of a yo-yo period for Scarborough, with a second promotion from Yorkshire 1 (via the playoffs) in 2002, relegation from North 2 East in 2003 (the highest level the club had reached), another relegation from Yorkshire 1 in 2004, before winning Yorkshire 2 (for the third time) in 2006.

=== Move to Silver Royd ===
While Scarborough found stability in Yorkshire 1, the focus switched to finding a new ground as The Old Showground in Newby was starting to deteriorate and could only accommodate one pitch. Despite some opposition from local residents, the club decided that the Scalby area to the north of Scarborough was most suitable, providing plenty of room for improved facilities and additional pitches. By 2009, led by unpaid CEO Graeme Young, the club had agreed the sale of its former home and was ready to move to the new site at Silver Royd, a venue spread over 32 acres, including the largest amateur club-house in the country, five senior pitches, five mini pitches, indoor facilities and grandstand, all at the cost of 4.5 million pounds. The ground is owned and operated entirely by Scarborough RUFC and the members have introduced some additional sports to complement rugby. On 24 January 2009, and after 82 years, the last ever 1st XV game was played at The Old Showground as Scarborough said goodbye with a 19–6 league win over Glossop. On 31 January 2009, Scarborough played its very first game at Silver Royd – a 3–15 loss against local rivals Bridlington.

=== A new era ===
Although league rugby was relatively unspectacular in the initial years following the move to Silver Royd, the cup competitions provided more interest. In 2014, Scarborough made the final of the Yorkshire Shield held at Clifton Park in York, losing 10–38 to Ilkley. The following year the club was entered into the RFU Intermediate Cup, defeating Blackburn, Medicals and Consett to book its place as the north's representative in the national semi-finals. Unfortunately, Scarborough was unable to reach the Twickenham final, losing a close game 6–10 to Midlands regional winners Bridgnorth.

After nine fruitless seasons at Silver Royd, Scarborough's luck would finally change during the 2017–18 season, gaining promotion by default having finished as runners up in Yorkshire 1 after Durham/Northumberland 1 side Durham City were unable to raise a side to contest the playoff game. The season got even better when Scarborough finally won the Yorkshire Shield at the third time of asking, defeating Old Rishworthians 41–27 at Brantingham Park in Brantingham on 18 May 2018. Despite being newcomers to North 1 East – which incidentally was the highest level the club had reached since the 2002–03 season – Scarborough more than held its own and booked a second successive promotion playoff after finishing runners up to champions, Morpeth. Sadly, Scarborough was denied its highest ever league position, as it lost 7–17 away to North 1 West runners Blackburn in the match held on 27 April 2019.

== Ground ==
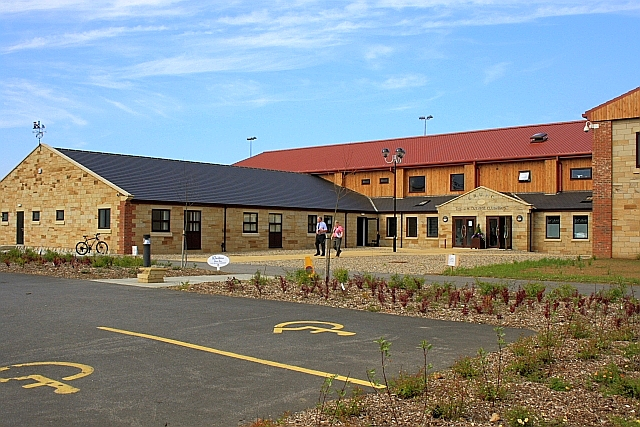
The ground in 2010

Scarborough RUFC plays home games at Silver Royd on Scalby Road (A171), on the northern outskirts of Scalby – a village to the north of Scarborough. The ground was built in 2009 at the cost of 4 million pounds and includes a clubhouse, fitness centre, all-seater grandstand, five full size pitches (two of which have floodlights), five mini pitches, a cricket pitch, and parking for 350 cars. The J.M. Guthrie Clubhouse contains three bars, Harley's cafe-bar (a coffee shop), meeting and function rooms, a snooker room, eight changing rooms and the club shop, while the Barons fitness centre contains a sports hall, the squash & racquets academy (four squash courts and two padel courts), two state of the art gyms and two fitness studios.

Due to its location on the outskirts of town, the ground is best accessed by car and there is plenty of parking on site. It is possible to catch a train to Scarborough railway station but a 3.5 mile walk to the ground would dissuade all but the keenest walkers. Capacity at Silver Royd around the main pitch is approximately 4500 – 425 seated in the grandstand, the rest standing pitch side or on the clubhouse balcony. The ground has also hosted the Yorkshire side in the County Championship on a number of occasions – most notably in the 2016 Bill Beaumont Cup when 1,896 supporters were at Silver Royd to watch Yorkshire play eternal rivals Lancashire. Yorkshire Carnegie have also played several British and Irish Cup fixtures at Silver Royd.

== Honours ==
- Yorkshire 2 champions (3): 1998–99, 2000–01, 2005–06
- Durham/Northumberland 1 v Yorkshire 1 promotion play-off winners (2): 2001–02, 2017–18
- Yorkshire Shield winners: 2018
- RFU Intermediate Cup: semi-finalists 2015

== Notable former players ==
- Mike Marshall – Number eight, who was the club's first ever England international, gaining 6 caps and playing in the 1938 Home Nations Championship. Died in World War II fighting for the Royal Navy with whom he received the DSC.
- (England) Zoe Aldcroft - Lock, became national captain in January 2025. She made her international debut against France in 2016, and was named World Rugby Women's 15s Player of the Year in 2021. 2025 Women's Rugby World Cup - winner.
- (Georgia (country)) Gigi Sirbiladze - Won the Rugby Europe Under-18 Championship with Georgia under-18.
