= Charlie Bott =

English rugby footballer

Personal information
- Full name: Charles H. Bott
- Born: second ¼ 1941 (age 84–85) Doncaster, England

Playing information
- Position: Prop
Club
| Years | Team | Pld | T | G | FG | P |
|---|---|---|---|---|---|---|
| 1962–67 | Oldham | 166 | 15 | 0 | 0 | 45 |
| 1967–71 | Salford | 160 | 12 | 1 | 0 | 38 |
| | Total | 326 | 27 | 1 | 0 | 83 |
Representative
| Years | Team | Pld | T | G | FG | P |
| 1966 | Great Britain | 1 | 0 | 0 | 0 | 0 |

Charles "Charlie" H. Bott (born second ¼ 1941) is an English former rugby union, and professional rugby league footballer who played in the 1960s and 1970s. He played club level rugby union (RU) for Old Thornensians RUFC (Thorne, Doncaster), and representative level rugby league (RL) for Great Britain, and at club level for Oldham and Salford, as a prop.

== Background ==
Charlie Bott was born in Doncaster, West Riding of Yorkshire, England.

== Club career ==
Bott started his rugby career as a rugby union footballer with Old Thornensians RUFC (Thorne, Doncaster) before moving to rugby league, joining Oldham in 1962. In May 1967, he transferred to Salford.

In 1969, he played in the Challenge Cup Final at Wembley Stadium against Castleford, which Salford lost 6–11. He played his final game for Salford against Halifax on 25 April 1971, in which he scored the only goal of his career with a conversion in front of the posts.

== International honours ==
Bott won a cap for Great Britain while at Oldham in 1966 against France.
