= Ian Marlow =

Wales international rugby league footballer

Personal information
- Full name: Ian Marlow
- Born: 18 January 1963 (age 62); Aylesbury, Buckinghamshire, England

Playing information

Rugby union
Club
Years	Team	Pld	T	G	FG	P
	Beverley RUFC

Rugby league
- Position: Prop, Second-row
Club
Years	Team	Pld	T	G	FG	P
1990–93	Hull FC	61	1	0	0	4
1993–96	Wakefield Trinity	77	3	0	0	12
	Total	138	4	0	0	16
Representative
Years	Team	Pld	T	G	FG	P
1991–95	Wales	7	1	0	0	4

Ian Marlow (born 18 January 1963) is an English-born former rugby union and professional rugby league footballer who played in the 1990s. He played at representative level for Wales, and at club level for Hull FC and Wakefield Trinity, as a prop or second-row.

Marlow was spotted by Hull FC playing rugby union for a local side in Beverley RUFC. He was a strong, no-nonsense forward with a good defensive game. He is a civil servant in West Yorkshire, England.

== Background ==
Ian Marlow was born in Aylesbury, Buckinghamshire, England.

== Playing career ==
=== International honours ===
Ian Marlow won caps for Wales while at Wakefield Trinity in 1993 against New Zealand, and in 1994 against France (interchange/substitute), and Australia.

=== Premiership Final appearances ===
Ian Marlow played second row (No 11) in Hull FC's 14-4 victory over Widnes in the Premiership Final during the 1990–91 season at Old Trafford, Manchester on Sunday 12 May 1991.
