= Pocklington RUFC =

Rugby union club in Yorkshire, England

(England) Pocklington
- Full name: Pocklington Rugby Union Football Club
- Union: Yorkshire RFU
- Founded: 1879; 147 years ago
- Location: Pocklington, East Riding of Yorkshire, England
- Ground: Percy Road
- Chairman: Mark Fletcher
- President: Paul Rhodes
- Director of Rugby: Matthew Webber
- Coach(es): Jack Bickerdike, David Massey
- Captain(s): John-Paul Kelly (club captain), Joe Holborough first XV captain)
- League: Regional 2 North East
- 2025–26: 2nd

Official website
- pocklingtonrufc.rfu.club

Pocklington Rugby Football Club is an English rugby union team based in Pocklington, East Riding of Yorkshire. The club runs three senior sides, a colts teams, women's team and eleven junior teams with the first XV currently playing in Regional 2 North East, and following a decision in 2026 to introduce 2XVs into the league structure, Pocklington's 2nd XV entered Counties 2 Yorkshire A division.

The club hosts an annual Sevens tournament every Good Friday called the Pock 7s which attracts teams from across the north of England.

== History ==
Rugby in Pocklington began in 1879 with Pocklington Rugby Club formed in 1928 following nearly half a century of teams coming and going in the East Yorkshire market town. Four years later the club bought its ground at Percy Road. In 1958 the club organised its first Sevens tournament and this has gone on to become one of the country's leading tournaments. The club has won the tournament twice (1996 and 1998). Since league rugby was introduced in 1987 the club has mostly participated in the upper echelons of the Yorkshire and the north east divisions. The club won two consecutive promotions in the early 2010s and after five seasons in North 1 East, in 2017 the club won promotion to the 5th tier North Premier for the first time. The club won just three fixtures, finishing in last place, and were immediately relegated to North 1 East. Five years later, the club was relegated again, to Counties 1 Yorkshire but in 2025 they were promoted back to Regional 2 North East as runner-up.

== Honours ==
- Yorkshire 1 champions (2): 1995–96, 2011–12
- North East 3 champions: 1997–98
- North East 2 champions: 1999–00
- Yorkshire 3 champions: 2003–04
- Yorkshire 2 champions: 2010–11
- North 1 East champions: 2016–17

== Ground ==
The club's main ground is at Percy Road. It comprises two pitches and a clubhouse. The club also has a secondary ground on Kilnwick Road, just to the east of the town. Consisting of two pitches, this ground is used primarily for junior rugby.

== Notable former players ==
- Frank Mitchell
- Rob Webber
