= York RUFC =

English rugby union club

- Full name: York Rugby Union Football Club
- Unions: Yorkshire RFU
- Founded: 1928; 98 years ago
- Location: York, North Yorkshire, England
- Ground: Clifton Park
- Chairman: Paul Simpson
- President: Micky Negri
- Coach(es): Graham Steadman, Declan Cusack
- Captain: Toby Atkin
- League: Regional 1 North East
- 2024–25: 4th

Official website
- www.yorkrufc.co.uk

York Rugby Union Football Club is an English rugby union team based in York. It has four senior men's teams and a women's team, along with a colts squad and eleven junior teams. The first XV currently plays in the Regional 1 North East division.

== Ground ==
York's ground is Clifton Park which is run by the joint body of York Sports Club which is between York RUFC, York Cricket Club, York Tennis Club and York Squash Club. It has four full sized rugby pitches, two full sized cricket pitches and squash and tennis courts

== Honours ==
- Yorkshire Cup champions: 2024-25
- Yorkshire Shield Winners x 4
- North East 2 champions: 1988–89
- North East 1 champions: 1991–92
- North 2 champions: 1993–94
- Yorkshire 1 champions: 2017–18
- North 1 East champions: 2019–20
