= Wetherby Grange =

Coordinates: 53°55′05.2″N 1°22′46.2″W

- Wetherby Grange
- Interactive map of the Wetherby Grange area

General information
- Location: Wetherby, England
- Construction started: 1700s
- Completed: 1800s
- Demolished: 1962

Wetherby Grange was a stately home in the Micklethwaite area of Wetherby, West Yorkshire. It was demolished in 1962.

== History and occupants ==
Originally known as Beilby Grange or Micklethwaite Grange, the house was built in the 17th century by the Beilby family. In Georgian times a tower and dome were added to the house. The house was purchased in 1831 by Colonel Robert Gunter upon returning from the Crimean War. Gunter became a Conservative MP. Gunter is listed on the 1871 census as living there with his wife and four daughters as well as 22 servants.

== Demolition ==
At the heart of a time when a culmination events saw many country houses demolished due to their high up keep costs, Wetherby Grange was too. The house was demolished in 1962 after it had fallen into disrepair. The house is now the site of the Grange Park sports park.
