= Fred Shaw (rugby union) =

English rugby union player (1871–1938)

- Born: Fred Shaw; September 1871 Cleckheaton, Yorkshire, England
- Died: 27 October 1938 (aged 67) East Bierley, Yorkshire, England

Rugby union career
- Position: Forward
Amateur team(s)
Years	Team	Apps	(Points)
–	Cleckheaton RUFC		
–	West Riding		
–	Yorkshire		
–	North of England		
–	Heckmondwike		
International career
Years	Team	Apps	(Points)
1898	England	1	(0)

Fred Shaw (September 1871 – 27 October 1938) was an English rugby union forward who represented Yorkshire, the North of England and England in the late 1890s. He was the first player from Cleckheaton RUFC to be selected for the North of England and the first from the club to gain full international honours.

== Early life and family ==
Shaw was born in Cleckheaton, Yorkshire, in September 1871. He was the son of Eliza Shaw, an unmarried domestic servant who in 1871 was working in Halifax.

Eliza never married and raised Fred as a single mother. He appears to have been her only child. By 1881 Shaw was living in Cleckheaton with his mother and grandmother, Mary Shaw.

Eliza later worked as a dressmaker and continued to do so for the rest of her working life. By 1911 she was recorded as living by independent means.

On 2 August 1897 Shaw married Jane Whitworth at St Peter’s Church, Birstall. The couple had four children: Samuel, Alice, Harry and Stanley.

== Working life ==
Outside rugby, Shaw worked in the building and construction trades. In 1901 he was employed as a pavior. By 1911 he was engaged in road and stone work.

In 1921 he was recorded as a steel mason employed by the Heavy Woollen Tramway Company, headquartered in Heckmondwike.

== Rugby career ==
Shaw began playing for Cleckheaton RUFC as a youth and developed there “when a mere lad”. He later assisted the West Riding club before returning to Cleckheaton after that organisation was disbanded.

By the mid-1890s he had become one of Cleckheaton’s leading forwards. During the 1896–97 season he scored six tries for the club.

In 1897 Shaw was selected to represent Yorkshire in the County Championship. Later that year he was chosen to play for the North of England, becoming the first Cleckheaton player to receive that distinction.

In January 1898 he was selected to play for England against Ireland. Contemporary reports described him as the first member of Cleckheaton Football Club to gain international honours.

During this period Shaw signed an agreement with the Bradford Club under which the club undertook to find him employment, a matter that attracted attention amid debates over professionalism following the 1895 split. By 1899 it was reported that he had left Cleckheaton and joined Heckmondwike.

== Later life and death ==
Shaw died on 27 October 1938, aged 67. Obituaries described him as a former Yorkshire and England Rugby Union star. He had retained an interest in Cleckheaton Rugby Club throughout his life.
