= Huddersfield YM RUFC =

(England) Huddersfield Laund Hill RUFC
- Full name: Huddersfield Laund Hill Rugby Union Football Club
- Union: Yorkshire RFU
- Founded: 1927; 99 years ago
- Location: Huddersfield, West Yorkshire, England
- Region: North East
- Ground: Laund Hill (Capacity: 2,000 (240 seats))
- Chairman: David Dyke
- President: David Mosley
- Captain: Stuart Dyke
- Top scorer: Stuart Morton
- League: Counties 2 Yorkshire

Official website
- www.hlhrufc.co.uk

Huddersfield Laund Hill Rugby Union Football Club is an English rugby union team based in Huddersfield, West Yorkshire. It runs four senior men's sides, a full set of junior teams and a women's team.

== History ==
The Rugby Club was formed in 1927 by six YMCA members, who had up until then been playing their rugby for Huddersfield RUFC. The ground and clubhouse are still on the original site, although there have been a number of changes since 1927.

A concrete Club House was built and opened in 1975 with this being replaced by the present building, “The Lawrence Batley Centre” which was built and opened in 1995. Prior to these and during redevelopment projects, players were accommodated in a number local of hostelries including the White Swan & Packhorse Mews, Spotted Cow, Dusty Miller and Wappy Spring. The main pitch was opened in 1989 with the “Lawrence Batley Stand” following in 1996. The stand was renamed in 2016 to “The Thomas Crapper Stand” following sponsorship by the company.

A Junior Section started during the summer of 1971.

In 2018, the club's first women's team, the Senior Roses, was established and added to the growing women and girls section at the club. The women's team currently boasts approximately 30 registered players. The Senior Roses played their 19/20 season within the new Inner Warrior Challenge Series Borders The women and girls section play at a development level, hosting festivals, pitch up, plays and boot camps.

In September 2022, after a tumultuous five years which had seen the Huddersfield YMCA complex going into administration, followed by the COVID-19 pandemic, Huddersfield YMCA RUFC was reborn as Huddersfield Laund Hill RUFC with a renewed focus on mini and junior rugby.

== Social Fitness and Mental Health ==
As a community rugby club, Huddersfield YM RUFC has a focus around social fitness and the benefits of sport in improving and reducing the stigma of mental health.

The club runs social fitness under the O2 Touch Rugby scheme. The club's O2 Touch is aimed at youth ages 14 and older and focuses on fun, rather than competition

In 2020, the club signed the Mental Health Charter for Sport and Recreation

== Facilities ==
Laund Hill Stadium is an RFU Gold Standard facility set within 18 acres of sports grounds. It has 10 playing fields with a first team pitch overlooked by “The Thomas Crapper Stand” which can seat up to 240 people. The clubhouse includes a sports bar and a suite for functions. From late 2021, the first team stadium is also home to Huddersfield Giants' Reserves, Academy, Scholarship and Women's teams.

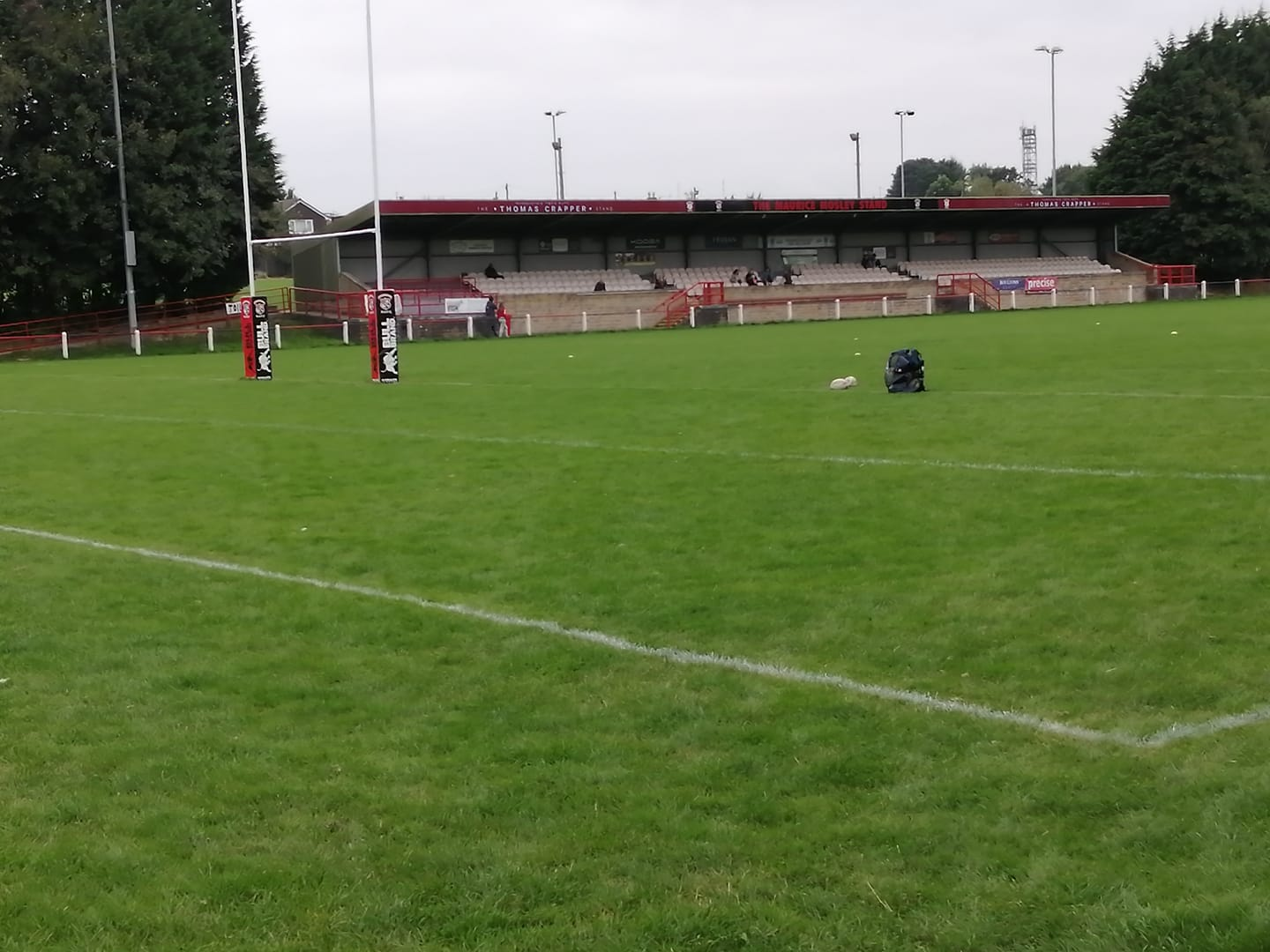

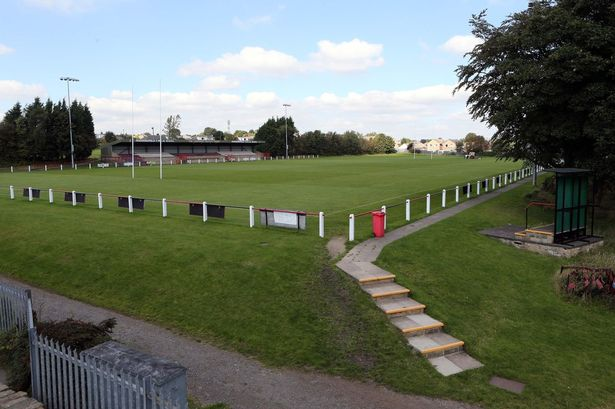

== Honours ==
League

- Yorkshire 3 Champions: 1996–97
- Yorkshire 2 Champions (2): 1997–98, 2001–02
- Yorkshire 1 Champions: 1998–99
- Durham/Northumberland 1 v Yorkshire 1 promotion playoff Winners: 2012–13
- North 1 (east v west) promotion playoff Winners: 2013–14

Cup

- Yorkshire Silver Trophy Winners (2): 1982–83, 1995–96
- Yorkshire Cable Shield Runners-up: 1996–97
- Yorkshire Shield Winners: 1997–98
- RFU Junior Tetley Bitter Vase Winners: 1997–98
