= Ilkley Rugby Club =

English rugby union club

(England) Ilkley
- Full name: Ilkley Rugby Football Club
- Union: Yorkshire RFU
- Nickname: Dalesmen
- Founded: 1899; 127 years ago
- Location: Ilkley, West Yorkshire, England
- Ground: Stacks Field (Capacity: 2,000 (40 seats))
- Chairman: TBA / Rugby Chairman: Andrew Munro
- President: John Barwick
- Coach(es): Rhys Morgan, Andrew Clithero
- Captain: Joe Lowes
- Top scorer: Declan Jackson
- League: Regional 1 North East
- 2024–25: 7th

Official website
- www.ilkleyrfc.co.uk

Ilkley Rugby Club is an English rugby union club based in Ilkley, West Yorkshire. The first XV team plays in Regional 1 North East. Ilkley has a successful sevens team which, in the 2017 season, won the national sevens competition. The club also operates a second XV, which in 2026 was allowed into the league structure, and it entered Counties 2 Yorkshire A division, and a juniors section.

== Honours ==
- Yorkshire Shield winners (3): 1993–94, 2010–11, 2013–14
- Yorkshire 2 promotion: 2003–04
- Durham/Northumberland 1 v Yorkshire 1 promotion play-off winners: 2007–08
- Yorkshire 1 champions: 2013–14
- North 1 East champions: 2014–15, 2021–22
- National Intermediate Cup finalists: 2014
- National Sevens Champions: 2017
