= Stockton RFC =

Rugby union club in County Durham, England

Stockton
- Full name: Stockton Rugby Football Club
- Union: Durham County RFU
- Founded: 1873; 153 years ago
- Ground: The Grangefield Ground
- Chairman: Vacant
- President: Brendan Thornton
- Director of Rugby: Phil Shaw
- Captain: Charlie Doherty
- League: Counties 1 Durham & Northumberland
- 2025–26: 3rd
1st kit	2nd kit

Official website
- stocktonrugby.co.uk

Stockton Rugby Football Club is an English amateur rugby union club, based in Stockton-on-Tees, County Durham, England. Founded in 1873, it currently competes in Counties 1 Durham & Northumberland, the seventh tier of the English rugby union league system, following their relegation from Regional 2 North in 2024. This is one tier above the club's 2nd XV which, when non-first teams were allowed into the league structure in 2026, the 2nd XV was placed in Counties 2 Durham & Northumberland South. They have played at The Grangefield Ground since 2015, after their move from Norton.

Scott Powell serves as director of rugby. Mark Skirving, Robert Green, Geoff Parling and Shaun McLaren are the other members of the coaching staff, their most recent league finish was fifth out of fourteen participating teams in the 2019–20 season; the season was abandoned prior to the season's conclusion due to the COVID-19 outbreak. The club currently runs six senior teams, four academy teams, six junior teams and three women's teams.

== History ==
The club was founded in 1873. Although few records survive from its earliest years, the club quickly became established in the regional game. By the 1874–75 season, Stockton already had five players representing Durham County against Yorkshire. By 1876, the club had established its home ground at Parkfield, near Bowesfield Lane. Like many sporting organisations, the club ceased operations during World War I in 1914.

After nearly a decade dormant, Stockton was reformed in 1923, largely through the efforts of Dr John Brydon. The growth of industry in the area helped bring new residents and potential players to the district. During this reformation, the club adopted its infamous red and white shirts and secured the Norton Showfield as their new home ground. Rapid expansion followed, leading to the formation of a second team within months of reestablishment, which was soon followed by the formation of a third team and support for local school rugby. The Norton ground was subsequently purchased through loans and extensive fundraising efforts, culminating in the construction of improved facilities, fencing and spectator areas. The club also developed a strong social culture, with annual balls, dances and fundraising events becoming important features of club life. However, the 1930s brought challenges, including playing standards fluctuated and results were often poor. The Norton ground was sold and the club became increasingly nomadic, moving to grounds at Eaglescliffe and Preston before the outbreak of World War II, with the club disbanding again.

Stockton was revived for a second time after the war, led by Sid Dumble, together with figures such as Arthur Blenkinsop, Ivor Dixon, Dennis Orriss, Arthur Rudd and Dr Maurice Klar. The club initially struggled, having had no permanent ground, clubhouse or significant finances; early teams often relied on opponents lending players to complete fixtures. Despite this, important developments followed, securing use of grounds at Hartburn and later Norton Cricket Club, the reorganisation of club administration under future Durham County president Rex Smith, improved playing performances by the late 1940s and the establishment of a Ladies Committee, whose fundraising helped finance new spectator facilities. The 1950s also saw Stockton players once again earning Durham County honours, reflecting a steady rise in playing standards. During the mid-20th century, players included brothers and future film directors Ridley and Tony Scott. Ridley played for the club's first team in the mid 1950s, while Tony played for the junior Colts team in the 1960s, and later became the club's patron.

Stockton reached the Durham Senior Cup final in 1964, although they were defeated by a powerful Durham City side containing several England internationals. The 1970s saw major investment in junior rugby. Club official Alan Todd played a significant role in developing the junior section, helping create a pathway that would later become one of Stockton’s greatest strengths. The club celebrated its 100th anniversary in 1973, marking a century that had included two world wars, two separate periods of closure, two successful revivals and continuous efforts to secure grounds, facilities and financial stability.

During the late 1980s, Stockton were well known for having a fantastic young team; during this time, they gained three promotions within four seasons to the division now known as the North Premier. Stockton remained in that league for ten years and during the 1990s won the Durham County RFU Senior Cup five times in seven times, which included a run which saw Stockton win this competition for three consecutive seasons. Stockton won the North Division 2, now known as North 1 East, in the 1990–91 season. When that league was named North Division 1, Stockton finished as runners-up in the 1994–95 season, failing to win promotion. Following the introduction of professionalism to rugby union, Stockton suffered hugely: the club maintained amateur status whilst other clubs began to pay their players in bids to rise to the top (Stockton did not pursue this simply because they did not have the money to do so), this in turn led to many key players departing for brighter things.

In 2001, Stockton were relegated to the North 2 East, where they remained for five seasons, before further relegation occurred. Following their devastating relegation, Stockton's youth system went on hiatus as a result of many volunteers concluding their free services. Stockton have since remained as regular members of Durham/Northumberland 1, having failed to gain promotion, though have always been strong contenders for promotion.

The 2010s have been more exciting and promising times for Stockton: their league finishing positions have always been reasonable though it was there major ground move that was most notable. They moved to The Grangefield Ground, in a partnership with nearby Stockton Cricket Club and The Grangefield Academy school: the playing pitches and indoor changing room facility (which includes a state-of-the-art sports hall) are situated behind the school whereas the clubhouse and two junior rugby pitches are situated across the road at the cricket club. In October 2019, the club leased a 5-acre site with existing pitch drainage and changing facilities, providing 6 pitches and a floodlit training pitch. The changing rooms and newly marked pitches were available for usage from 31 October onwards. This new site is located behind the existing pitches.

In April 2020, Stockton appointed Scott Powell, Mark Skirving and Robert Green as the coaching staff ahead of the 2020–21 season. Further appointments followed, as Shaun McLaren – a former first team player of the club and strength and conditioning coach for the Great Britain national rugby league team – joined the team as well as a high-profile Geoff Parling – a notable product of the club's youth system who went on to be capped by England during his professional playing career.

== Grounds and locations ==
Stockton played outside of the traditional Stockton-on-Tees area for 67 years, playing their home games at Norton. In their later years, the club had a partnership with the Norton Sports Charity, where they worked together to improve the facilities and raise more funds for both the club and the charity. For years, the club had opted to make a return to the Stockton area, in a bid to raise the number of people from Stockton to play for the club, and to be a member of rugby clubs that play in their traditional home area where they originated.

In 2015, Stockton departed Norton, relocating to The Grangefield Ground, a newly constructed state-of-the-art sporting complex, located in Grangefield, Stockton-on-Tees. This move allowed Stockton to become more involved within the local community, as they entered into a partnership with Stockton Cricket Club and The Grangefield Academy. Currently, the ground includes six rugby union pitches, a training complex (which includes four changing rooms and a multi-purpose sports hall) and another changing room complex.

== Colours and crest ==
The traditional club colours are red, white and blue: the playing shirt is red and white horizontal stripes, the shorts are navy blue whereas the socks are red and white striped. The club colours have varied numerously: some of the club's teams' kits have varied throughout the years (most youth teams' coaches previously decided on their own kit design until a recent club decision, like other clubs, was to have all teams kits identical though some with different sponsors).

The away kit is either light blue with a red chest or navy and white stripes (very similar to the home kit). Of course, the away kit has always varied throughout the years with different colours and designs.

The club badge contains a castle and anchor, similar to the Stockton Town Football Club badge, which presents the town's shipbuilding history in the seventeenth and eighteenth centuries.

== Honours ==
- Durham County RFU Senior Cup (6): 1990–91, 1992–93, 1993–94, 1994–95, 1996–97, 2025–26
- North East 1 champions (1): 1989–90
- North 2 champions: 1990–91

== Players ==
=== Team system ===
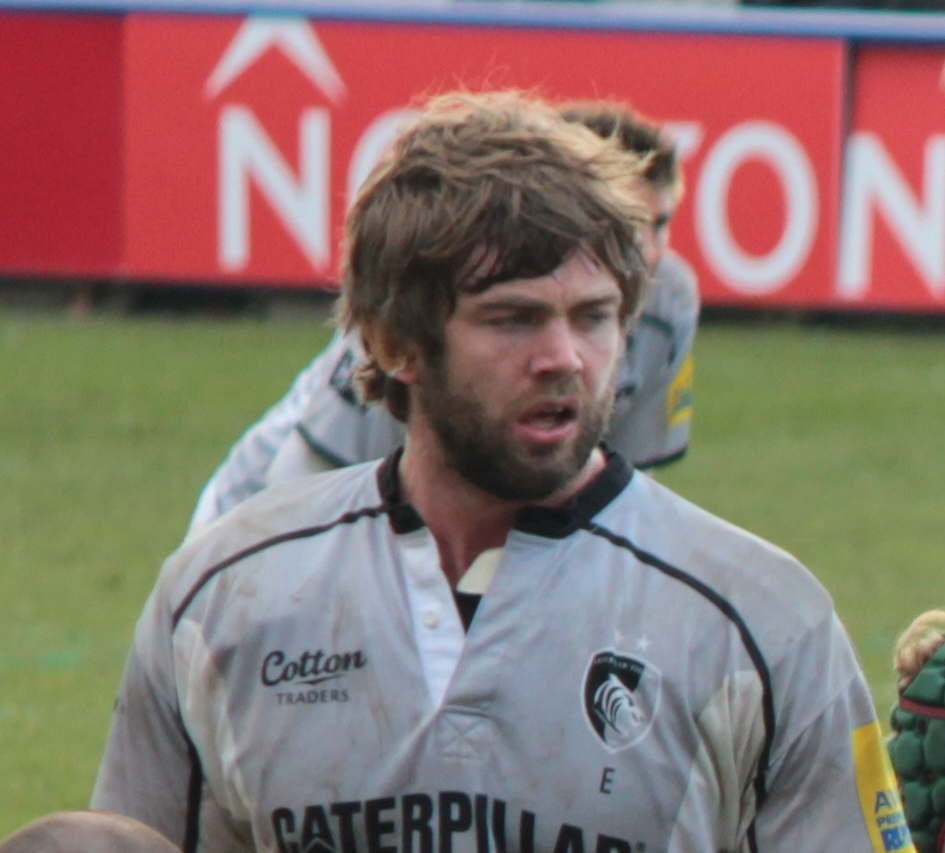
Geoff Parling, a member of Stockton's youth system, made his international debut for England in 2012

Stockton currently runs five senior teams: the first team, which compete in Durham/Northumberland 1; Saracens (second team), which compete in the C.A.N.D.Y. League Division Two; Stocktonians (third team), which compete in the Tees Valley Social League; the Occasionals, who do not compete in a league and take part in friendlies; and Touch Rugby, who also do not compete in any league and take part in friendlies.

The club's youth system is currently considered as one of the best in the North East of England. Stockton currently runs an academy set-up which includes an under-16s, under-15s, under-14s and under-13s. After an academy players concludes his season with the under-16s, he goes on to play for the "Colts" side, the youngest senior team.

Furthermore, the club runs a "midi" section, which includes an under-12s, under-11s, under-10s, under-9s, under-8s and under-7s. The midi players are occasionally mascots and "ball boys" at Newcastle Falcons matches.

A notable player who came through the Stockton youth system is Geoff Parling, a local rugby player who went on to play for Newcastle Falcons, Leicester Tigers and Exeter Chiefs. Parling has been capped for England on 29 occasions, and was selected for the British & Irish Lions' tour to Australia in 2013.

List of teams run by Stockton (as of 2020)
Senior	Academy	Mini/Midi	Women
First team	Under 16s	Under 12s	Rockets
Saracens	Under 15s	Under 11s	Under 15s
Stocktonians	Under 14s	Under 10s	Under 13s
Occasionals	Under 13s	Under 9s	
Colts		Under 8s	
Touch Rugby		Under 7s	

=== County caps ===
Player	County	Appearances	Duration
N. Bowen	Durham	3	1926–1927
K. Williamson	Durham	11	1949–1951
C.H. Tealey	Durham	9	1949–1951
R.L. Coulson	Durham	1	1950–1951
D. Richardson	Durham	1	1955–1956
E.A. Chapman	Durham	32	1961–1966
O. Turnbull	Durham	6	1964–1967
C. Sinclair	Durham	2	1964–1965
C. Bacon	Northumberland	3	1965–1966
A. Makin	Durham	1	1975–1976
D. Cooke	Durham	7	1983–1985
P. Marley	Glam	1	1986–1987
M. Douthwaite	Durham	29	1987–1995
G. Naisbitt	Durham	27	1987-1994
B. Dixon	Durham	18	1987–1995
A. Brown	Durham	10	1988–1990
J. Saunders	Durham	3	1988–1991

Player	County	Appearances	Duration
P. Lee	Durham	6	1989–1996
C. Aldus	Durham	8	1993–1995
P. Beattie	Durham	3	1993–1994
K. Etherlngton	Durham	9	1995–1997
M. Howe	Durham	10	1995–1998
D. Tighe	Durham	3	1996–1997
S. Crozier	Durham	2	1996–2001
D. Muirhead	Durham	1	1997–1998
J. Good	Notts, Lincs & Derby	6	1999–2004
W. Brown	Durham	1	2000–2001
S. Powell	Durham	1	2003–2004
S. Powell	Durham	1	2010–2011
T. Jeffery	Durham	1	2010–2011
S. Tampin	Durham	3	2018–2019
C. Doherty	Durham	1	2018–2019
J. Horner	Durham	2	2018–2019
J.F. Roxby	Durham	3	2018–2019
