= Beverley RUFC =

Rugby union club in Yorkshire, England

Beverley
- Full name: Beverley Rugby Union Football Club
- Union: Yorkshire RFU
- Nickname: Beavers
- Founded: 1883; 143 years ago
- Location: Beverley, East Riding of Yorkshire, England
- Ground: Beaver Park
- Chairman: Brian Gilbert
- President: Carol Innes
- Coach: Rob Smith
- Captain: Luke Hazel
- League: Counties 1 Yorkshire
- 2024–5: 5th
Team kit

Official website
- www.beverleyrufc.co.uk

Beverley Rugby Football Club is an English rugby union team based in Beverley, East Riding of Yorkshire. The club runs two senior men's sides, colts, ladies and a full set of junior teams.

== History ==
Beverley RUFC was originally founded in 1883, had a stint as Longcroft Old Boys before reassuming the club's current name in 1965. The club has played in both the North East and Yorkshire divisions of the club rugby union hierarchy. During the mid-2000s the club won four consecutive promotions, moving from Yorkshire 2 to the national level when the club spent the 2007–08 season in the old National 3 North when that division was at the fourth level of club rugby. However, Beverley has suffered two relegations since then, but after one season in North 1 East, they were promoted as champions and spent two seasons in National League 3 North before being relegated back into North 1 East and the following season into Yorkshire 1.

The Beavers won the 2024 final of the Papa John's Counties 1 North shield, beating Peterborough Lions 58–33.

== Honours ==
- Yorkshire Silver Trophy winners: 1974–75
- Humberside Cup winners (2): 1983–84, 1986–87
- Yorkshire Shield winners (3): 1985–86, 1996–97, 2003–04
- North East 2 Champions: 1996–97
- Yorkshire Division Two champions: 2003–04
- Yorkshire Division One champions: 2004–05
- North 2 (east v west) promotion play-off winner: 2005–06
- North 1 v Midlands 1 promotion play-off winner: 2006–07
- North 1 East champions: 2012–13
- Papa Johns Counties 1 North Shield 2024 winners
