= Grange Park, Wetherby =

Sports facility in Wetherby, England

Grange Park
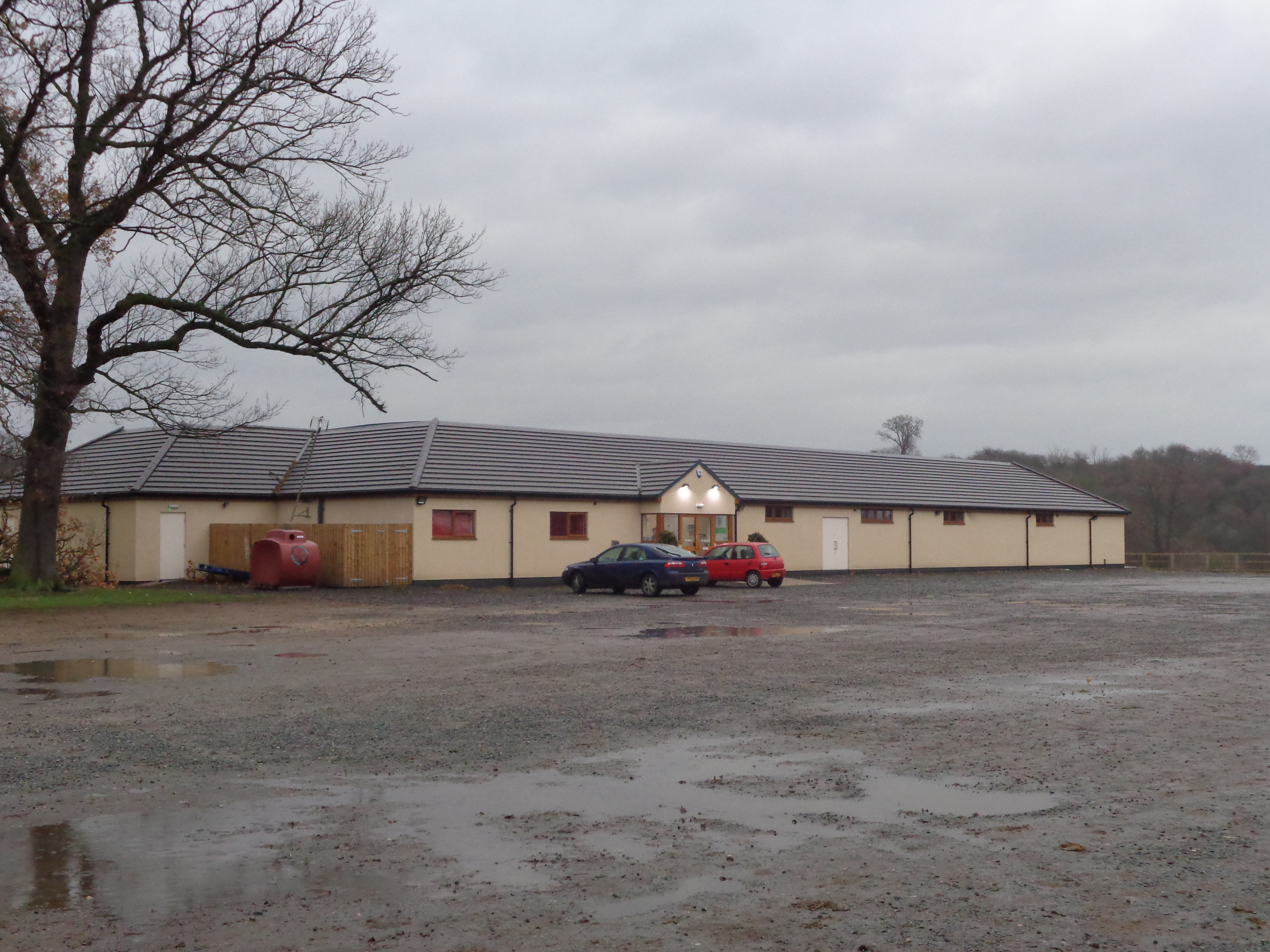
- Interactive map of Grange Park
- Location: Wetherby, West Yorkshire
- Country: England
- Coordinates: 53.91935°N 1.3811°W
- Establishment: 1988

Grange Park is a multi-purpose sports facility in Wetherby, West Yorkshire, England. The facility is used for Padel, Rugby Union, Bowls (Crown Green and Flat Green) and junior Football. The complex is the largest community sports facility in Wetherby.

== History ==
Grange Park opened in its current form in 1988. It replaced a former cricket ground on the same location, which was closed after the second Wetherby by-pass (now the A1(M)) cut through its pitch. Prior to that the site was occupied by Wetherby Grange, a large stately home demolished in 1962.

The rugby club relocated to the new ground from Loshpot Lane in Kirk Deighton. A new clubhouse opened shortly afterwards, which was later extended with the addition of a large home-side Rugby dressing room. Demolition of the first clubhouse began in 2012 with its larger replacement opened in 2013.

== Clubhouse ==
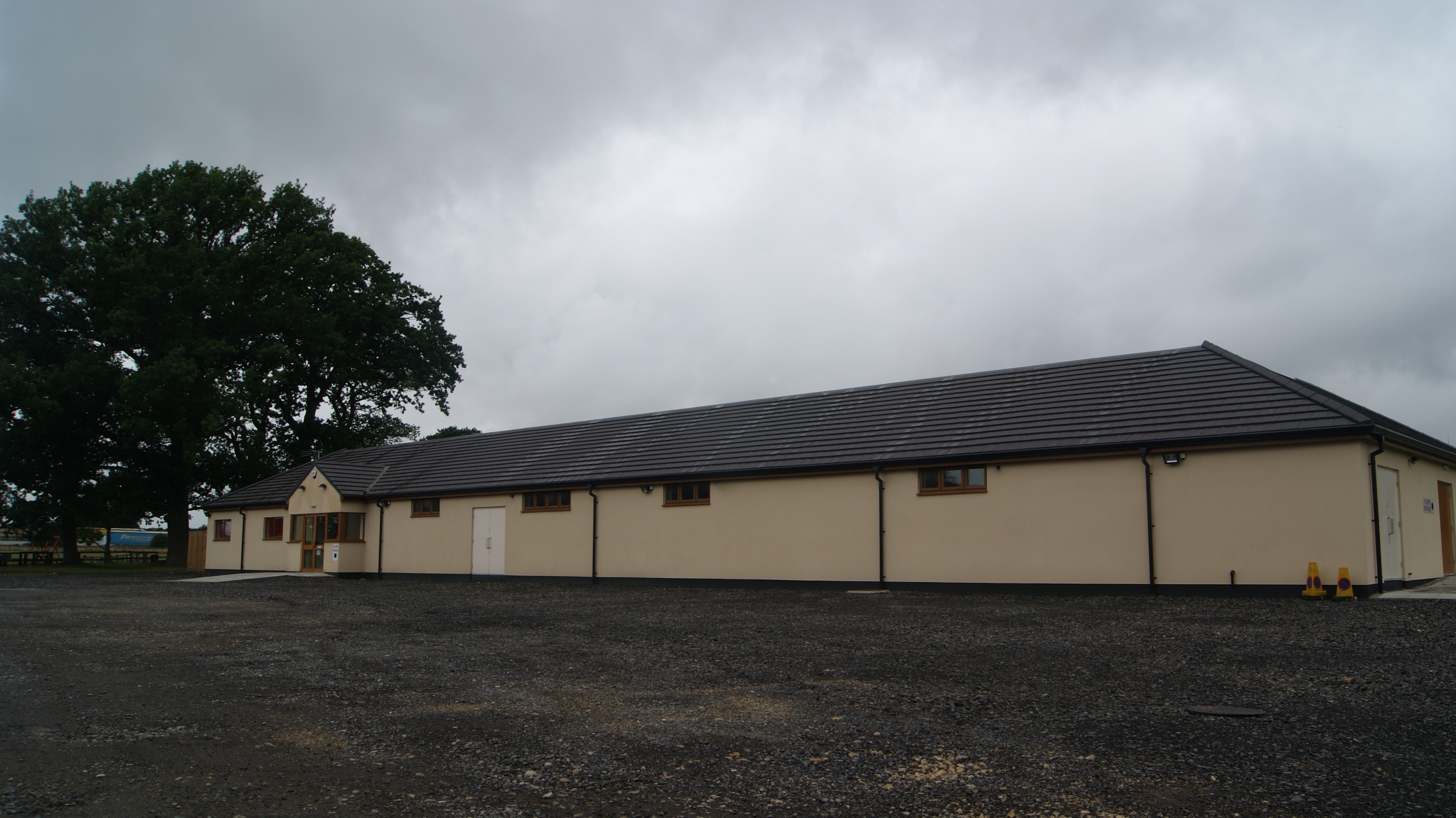
The new clubhouse, seen the year it opened.

The original clubhouse was similar in appearance to the current one and took a single-storey form. It originally opened with two bars (a club room and a best room with a bar counter that ran between the two), a kitchen, four dressing rooms (two cricket, two rugby) and players' showers. It was later extended to provide a third rugby dressing room, somewhat larger than the others. A veranda was added later. Despite several plans to modernise and extend it, it was demolished in 2012.

The current clubhouse also takes a single storey form and is similar in layout and appearance to its predecessor. The bar area is larger than that of the former clubhouse (although compromises only one room, compared to the formers two), as are the dressing rooms. Unlike the former facilities, it offers separate dressing facilities for match officials. To the rear it has a recessed veranda, rather than the protruding one that was a later addition to the former clubhouse.

The bowling club has a separate wooden pavilion adjacent to its greens, towards the opposite side of the car park from the main clubhouse.

In 2024, co-owner Angela Wood of the Wetherby club stated, "We’re a bit more rough and ready but it's inclusive and we’'e trying to build a community."

== Sports facilities ==
=== Cricket ===
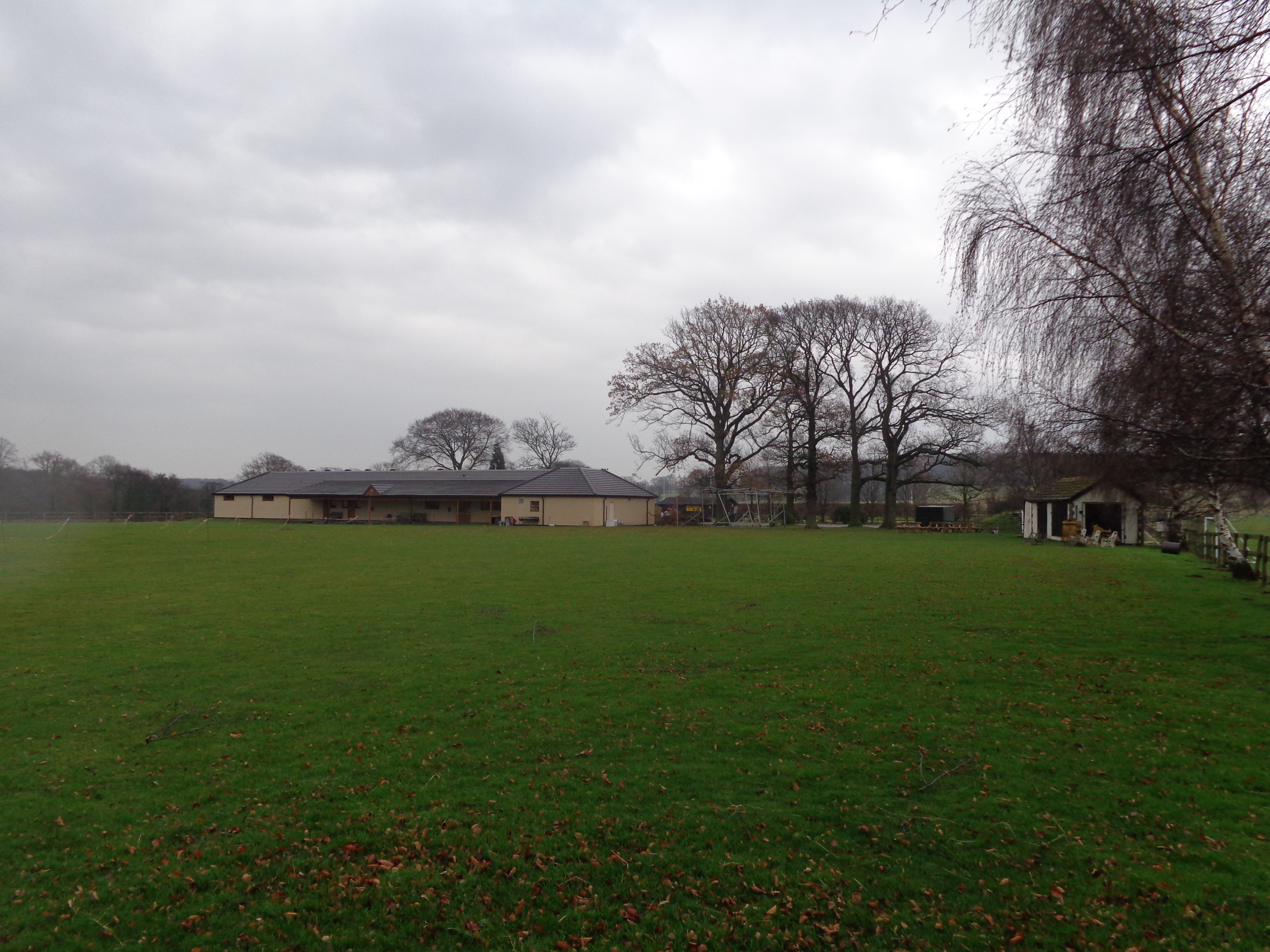
The cricket field with the clubhouse in the background.

The sites single cricket pitch is situated to the rear of the main clubhouse, with the clubhouse acting as a pavilion. There are no stands around the pitch. Practice nets are situated close to the pitch.

=== Rugby ===
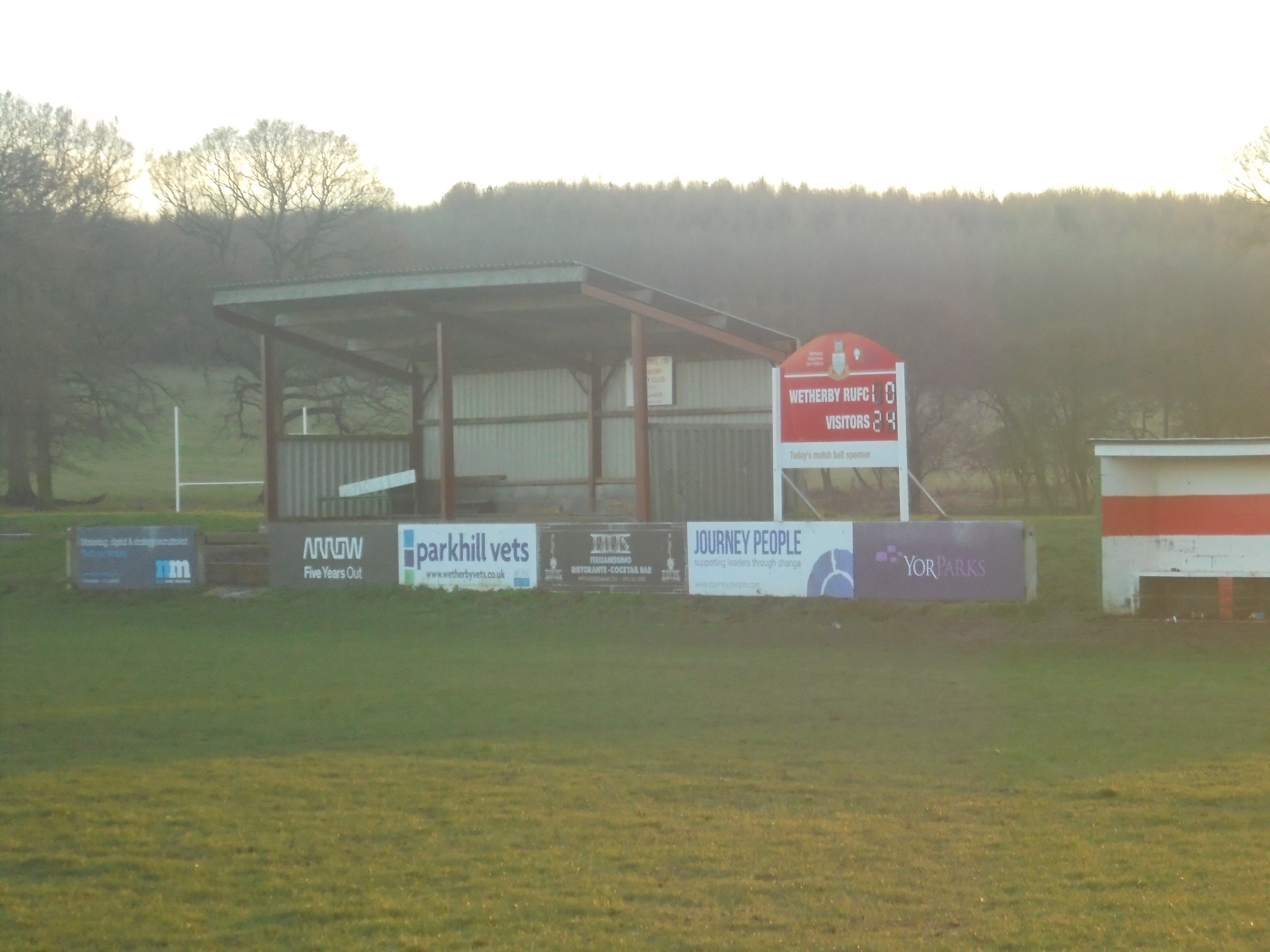
Grandstand by the first team rugby pitch

There are currently four rugby pitches, situated to the south of the site. The alignment of the pitches was changed in the mid-1990s to a north–south alignment to minimise crosswind. There are no stands, although plans have been previously proposed. Two of the pitches are floodlit, although not to a standard which permits full playing. A small grandstand was added in the late 2010s.

=== Bowling ===
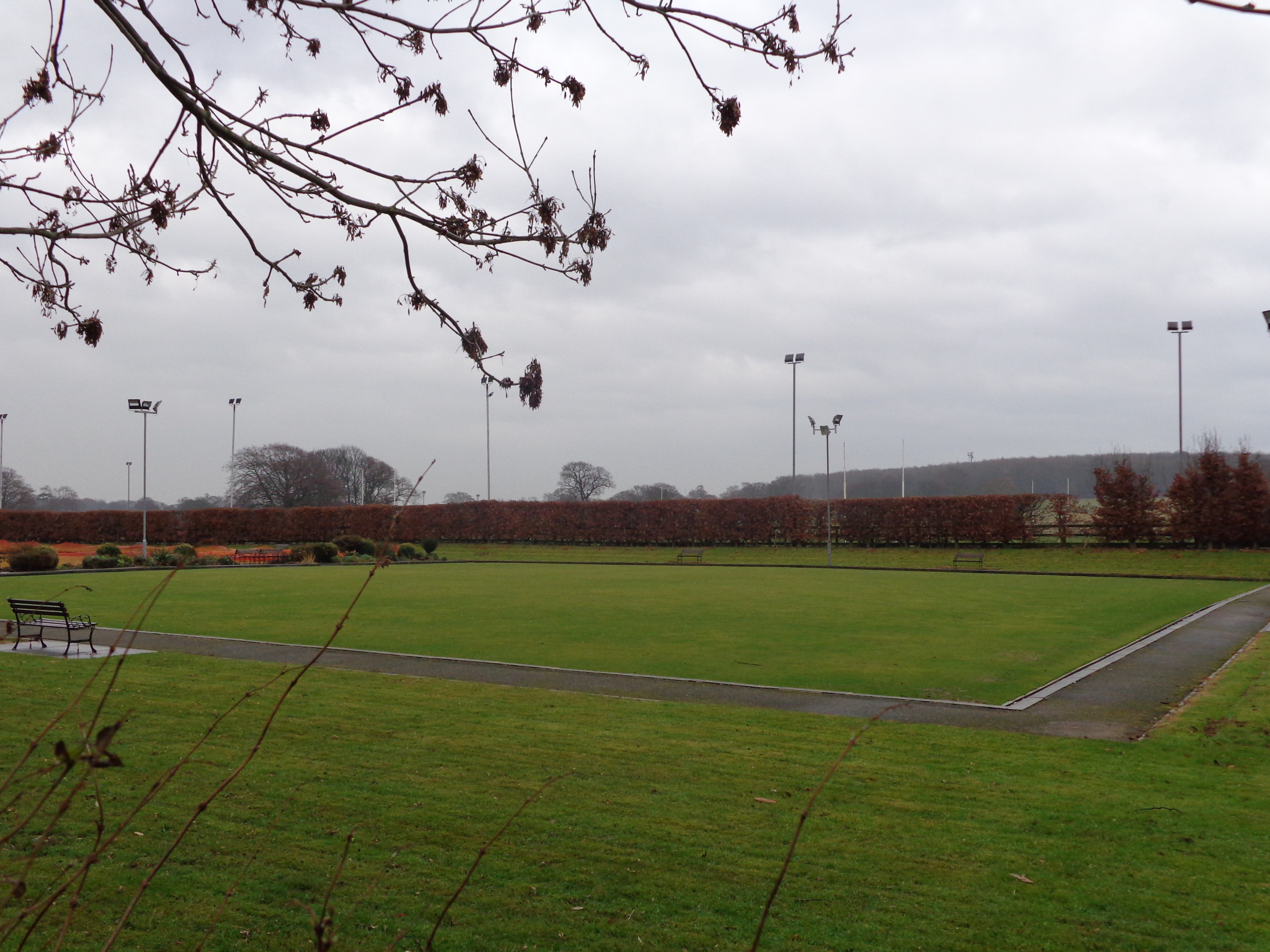
The bowling greens.

In between the main clubhouse and the car park are the site's two bowling greens. Unlike the Cricket and Rugby who share a clubhouse, the bowling club has its own pavilion, thus the club has not participated in the funding of recent improvements. The two greens (one flat, one crown) are floodlit to a level which allows full night playing. The greens are the oldest continuous part of the site, having been laid in 1987; a year after the club formed.

== Other facilities ==
The site has a car park for around 100 vehicles, a children's playground and a catering unit close to the rugby pitches which are some distance from the clubhouse.

== Clubs ==
- Wetherby Cricket Club, occupy the single cricket pitch adjacent to the clubhouse.
- Wetherby RUFC, occupy the four rugby pitches to the south of the clubhouse, bowling club and car park.
- Wetherby Bowling Club, occupy the two greens between the main clubhouse and the rugby club. The bowling club have their own pavilion and their own facilities and as such are not part of the Grange Park Sports Club.
- Kirk Deighton Junior Football Club, have no set area, moved here owing to a shortage of room at their Kirk Deighton ground.

== Access ==
The ground is situated close to Junction 45 of the A1(M) motorway and is around 10–15 minutes walk from Wetherby bus station.
