= Darlington RFC =

Rugby union club in county Durham, England

Darlington
- Full name: Darlington Rugby Football Club
- Union: Durham County RFU
- Founded: 1863; 163 years ago
- Location: Darlington, County Durham, England
- Ground: Blackwell Meadows (Capacity: 3,000)
- Chairman: Andrew Gunnell
- President: Ali Bell
- Coach: Men’s 1xv : Liam Shanahan Ladies 1xv: Chris Anderson
- League: Counties 1 Durham & Northumberland
- 2024−25: 8th
Team kit

Official website
- www.pitchero.com/clubs/darlingtonrfc

Darlington RFC are a rugby union team that are situated in the north east town of Darlington, County Durham. They play at Blackwell Meadows on the south side of the town running parallel to the town's A66 by-pass. The first XV plays in Counties 1 Durham & Northumberland and its 2nd XV, Darlington Bulls, plays in Counties 3 Durham & Northumberland South.

The club runs a youth and mini rugby tournament every year Darlington Festival, traditionally on May bank holiday weekend. This is attended by teams from across the north of England and Scotland.

== History ==
On 18 October 1863, the committee of Darlington Cricket Club held a special meeting to discuss the problem of members who drifted away during the winter months. It was the club's president, Mr Speciall, who suggested a possible solution. He proposed that 'A Club be formed to play Football according to the Rugby Code, to supersede cricket during the winter.' The proposal was agreed unanimously, and Darlington Rugby Club was born – although for some years it was to be known as Darlington Football and Athletic Club. The word 'Rugby' was not incorporated into its title until the 1880s, when Association Football started to become popular. In 1888 a former player of the club, Herbert Brooks was selected to take part in the first British tour of New Zealand and Australia.

The north east's original rugby club – for such it was – was first captained by Tom Watson, a great sportsman whose family owned a saddlery business in town. By 1865 it had eighty members, who organised matches amongst themselves, but by the late 1860s, mainly on Tom Watson's initiative, regular fixtures were arranged against Durham School, Leeds and Rochdale, among others. In 1872 Darlington played a Northumberland side on the cricket ground at Newcastle, and when the first inter-county match was organised in the following year, between Durham and Yorkshire, the whole of the Durham side was made up of Darlington men.

Following a period of doldrums in the early 20th century, caused not least by the First World War, Darlington RFC gained new strength in the 1920s and 1930s, when it produced several first rate County players. One of them was the late G. Tarn Bainbridge, who became President of the RFU in 1975.

Between the wars, Darlington RFC' ground was at Hunden's Lane (next door to the infectious diseases hospital!) It moved to a new site at Lingfield Lane in 1952, and from there to its present premises at Blackwell Meadows in 1994, moving to their £1.7 million development after selling their previous location of McMullen Road in the town for retail development.

On 3 March 2013 the club hosted the first, and only, international game of rugby union in Darlington between England U18 and Scotland U18. A crowd of 1600 were in attendance, to watch England win 57–13, which doubled the previous high for a match at this level.

Two of the club's most famous past players include Rob Wainwright (ex Scotland and British Lions) and England centre Mathew Tait who spent a brief time in the club's youth teams.

== Club colours ==
Home and away: The traditional colours are a black and white hooped shirt, black shorts and red socks.

== Honours ==
- Durham/Northumberland Division 1 champions (2): 1995–96, 2011–12
- North East 3 champions: 1996–97
- North East 2 champions: 1998–99
- Durham Senior Cup winners (3): 2001, 2002, 2005
- Durham Junior Cup winners (1): 2024
- North 2 (east v west) promotion play-off winner: 2000–01
- North Division 1 champions: 2002–03
