= Old Brodleians =

Old Brodleians RUFC
- Full name: Old Brodleians RUFC
- Union: Yorkshire RFU
- Nickname: Brods
- Founded: 1930; 96 years ago
- Location: Hipperholme, West Yorkshire, England
- Ground(s): Woodhead Park & Beaver Park
- Chairman: Andrew Mear
- President: Richard 'Bruce' Turner
- Coach(es): Neil Sheard, Lee Imiolek, Harry Dunne, Rob Jennings, George Ramsey
- Captain(s): 1st XV: Elliot Craven, 2nd XV: Harry Wardman, Beavers: Ryan Loach, Colts XV: Alfred Loach Ladies: Sophie Burn
- League: Regional 2 North East
- 2024–25: 5th

Official website
- www.oldbrodleians.co.uk

Old Brodleians RUFC (or Brods, as they are known) are an English rugby union club from Hipperholme, near Halifax, West Yorkshire. The club currently operates three senior men's teams, a ladies team and a full range of junior teams for both boys and girls. In the past there was a veterans side whose regular European tour tradition has been carried on by the club's third team, "The Beavers". The club also run five netball teams "Yorkshire Brodleians".

== History ==
Old Brodleians was founded in 1930 by former pupils of the Hipperholme Grammar School. As the school was endowed in the will of a local man, Matthew Brodley hence, the 'Old Brodleians' was chosen as the club's name. In the early years they struggled to raise a full team and almost went out of existence in 1934. By 1939 the Brods ran two teams and had established themselves as a prominent junior club with a reputation for scrappy rugby.

When league rugby was introduced in 1987, Brods were placed in North East One. They stayed in that league until they were placed in Yorkshire 1 when the 1998 restructuring took place. They are back in Yorkshire 1 after a short spell in the North 1 East league, after achieving promotion from Yorkshire 1 at the end of the 2008–09 season. The club currently play in Regional 2 North East following their promotion from Counties 1 Yorkshire in 2019–20 season.

== Grounds ==
The club play their matches at Woodhead ground in Hipperholme. A gas decontamination centre behind the council offices at Hipperholme was transformed into changing rooms and clubhouse after the war. Whilst these facilities were adequate the aim was to own and develop the club's own facilities. The chance to purchase the 18 acre (later extended to 23 acre) Woodhead ground was taken, supported by an RFU loan, and in 1963 the old hut was erected. The hut was an old RAF hospital wooden structure purchased for £700. It took two years but club members beavered away and a homely clubhouse with changing rooms and bath was the result. Many members have fond memories of the old hut but 27 April 2003 marked the end of an era when Charlie Hodgson cut the ribbon to open the rebuilt clubhouse. The new clubhouse stands as a permanent memorial to Colin Green who wrote " Although it seemed obvious to me that the club must start to plan for gradual replacement of its timber framed clubhouse. I was quick to learn that the old building was very dear to the hearts of older members and much loved by current players. So I trod carefully."

== Honours ==
- Yorkshire 2 champions: 2007–08
- Yorkshire 1 champions (2): 2008–09, 2019–20
- Yorkshire Shield Winners 2018–19

== Notable players ==
- (Cyprus) Dominic Georgiou – Cypriot international
- (Cyprus) Chris Georgiou – Cypriot international
- (England) Tom Inman – plays for Halifax Panthers
- (England) Tom Parkin – plays for Doncaster Knights
- Charlie Hodgson – Sale Sharks, Saracens and England international
- Jacob Umaga – Wasps, Benetton and England international
- Zach Mercer – Gloucester, Bath, Montpellier and England international
- Lee Imiolek – Sale Sharks, England under-20
- (England) Alan Rhodes – Bradford Northern, Halifax, Hudddersfield Giants
