= Cleckheaton RUFC =

English rugby union club based in West Yorkshire

(England) Cleckheaton RUFC
- Full name: Cleckheaton Rugby Union Football Club
- Union: Yorkshire RFU
- Nickname(s): Lambs, Cleck, The HeatonCleck RUFC'
- Founded: 1888; 138 years ago, Reformed: 1926
- Location: Cleckheaton, West Yorkshire, England
- Ground(s): Cleckheaton Sports Club, Moorend, BD19 3UD
- Chairman: Carl Mason
- President: Bob Wilson
- Coach(es): Joe Bedford, Simon Worrall
- Captain: Dale Breakwell
- League: Regional 1 North East
- 2024–25: 6th
Team kit

Official website
- www.cleckheatonrufc.com

Cleckheaton Rugby Union Football Club is an English rugby union club based in Cleckheaton, West Yorkshire. The club runs four senior sides and twelve junior teams. The first XV currently plays in Regional 1 North East and, following a decision in 2026 to introduce 2XVs into the league structure, Cleckheaton's 2nd XV entered Counties 3 Yorkshire B division.

== History ==
Cleckheaton first formed a rugby club in 1888 and opted to play union when rugby league was formed in 1895. The club was suspended at the start of World War One and reformed in 1926.

== Honours ==
- Yorkshire 1 champions: 2000–01
- North Division 1 East champions (2): 2001–02 2012–13
- North 1 v Midlands 1 promotion play-off winners: 2003–04

== International players ==
Past Cleckheaton players who have gone on to play international rugby include

- (England) Jeff Butterfield
- (England) Roger Pickering
- (England) John Bentley
- (England) Fred Shaw — Cleckheaton’s first international player in 1898
