= Pontefract RUFC =

Pontefract
- Full name: Pontefract Rugby Football Club
- Union: Yorkshire RFU
- Location: Pontefract, West Yorkshire, England
- Ground: Moor Lane
- League: Regional 2 North East
- 2024–25: 7th

Official website
- www.pontefractrufc.com

Pontefract Rugby Club is an English rugby union club based in Pontefract, West Yorkshire. The club runs three senior teams plus colts, juniors and girls teams. The first XV play in Regional 2 North East, following their relegation from Regional 1 North East in 2023–24. The club also runs a 2nd XV which, following a decision in 2026 to introduce 2XVs into the league structure, will enter Counties 3 Yorkshire B division, a women's teams, a colts side and junior teams.

The club's ground is located in Carleton, a village on the southern outskirts of the town.

== Honours ==
- Regional 2 North East champions: 2022–23
- Yorkshire 1 champions: 2006–07
- Yorkshire 2 champions: 2017–18
