= Driffield RUFC =

English rugby union club, based in England

Driffield
- Full name: Driffield Rugby Football Club
- Union: Yorkshire RFU
- Founded: 1926; 100 years ago
- Location: Driffield, East Yorkshire, England
- Ground: Show Ground
- League: Regional 1 North East
- 2025–26: 6th

Official website
- www.driffieldrufc.com

Driffield Rugby Club is an English rugby union club based in Driffield, East Yorkshire. The first XV team plays in Regional 1 North East, having been promoted from North 1 East into tier five following the league restructuring at the end of the 2021–22 season, and following a decision in 2026 to introduce 2XVs into the league structure, Driffield's 2nd XV entered Counties 2 Yorkshire A division.

The club is located at Kelleythorpe, approximately 1 mile (1.6 km) south-west of Driffield town centre. However, the club's original home was a field off St Johns Road, playing there from their formation in 1926 until the 1950s.

== Honours ==
- Yorkshire 1 champions (2): 1991–92 and 2012–13
