= Thornensians RUFC =

Yorkshire rugby union club

United Kingdom
- Full name: Thornensians Rugby Union Football Club
- Unions: Yorkshire RFU and RFU
- Nickname: The Lions
- Founded: 1939
- Location: Thorne, Doncaster
- Region: South Yorkshire
- Ground(s): Thornensians Pavilion, Church Balk

Thornensians Rugby Union Football Club (R.U.F.C) is a rugby union club based in Thorne, South Yorkshire.

The club was founded in 1939, originally as Old Thornensians, by Mr J.E. Shipley-Turner, the former headmaster of Thorne Grammar School. He made the decision to replace association football with rugby union as the school's winter sport. This later led to him becoming the first president of the club. The club continues to play at Church Balk in Thorne, next to the original school, now known as Trinity Academy.

In modern times, they made it to national status when they went on a wonder run in May 2019 and ended up playing at Twickenham Stadium for the first time in the club's history.

The club, as of January 2026, sits in the Counties 3 Yorkshire Division. The adult teams are for men, with separate men's and women's teams for players under 18 years old. There are also mixed teams for children under 10 years old. The club's playing colours are blue, black and white hoops.

== Yorkshire Cup successes ==
Thornensians have won the Yorkshire Cup, the county's leading rugby union challenge competition, on two occasions. In 1961 the club beat West Leeds Old Boys, and then in 1962, they won the cup by eventually beating York Railway Institute. The score for their game against West Leeds Old Boys was 6–3, essentially won by Thornensians' forwards , but all the points came from penalty goals. The game was played at Scratcherd Lane, Morley. The second win was more of a struggle: the first game ended 3–3 and the replay ended 0–0, but finally on the second replay, Thornensians pulled out in front, dominated the game and won 12–6, despite a late drop goal from their opponents. Both replays were played at Cross Green, and the first game was played at Scratcherd Lane.

== List of captains (1946–2020) ==
Captains of the men's first team:

- 1946–54 R.M.L. Anderson
- 1954–56 R. Clayton
- 1956–57 A. Hall
- 1957–58 A.D.M. Yeoman
- 1958–59 T.D. Hemmingway
- 1959–61 M. Gallagher
- 1961–62 T. Scanlon
- 1962–63 D.J. Smith
- 1963–65 T. Scanlon
- 1965–68 J.K. Stothard
- 1968–70 W. Carr
- 1970–73 R. Horner
- 1973–74 V.J. Fox
- 1974–75 B. Willis
- 1975–76 V.J. Fox
- 1976–78 W.I. Ridgill
- 1978–80 M. Greenslade
- 1980–82 M. Lloyd
- 1982–85 R. Colwill
- 1985–87 T. Burrows
- 1987–88 J. Marshall
- 1988–90 R. Worrall
- 1990–91 K. Fenwick
- 1991–93 N. Martin
- 1993–95 N.Hall
- 1995–96 K. Fenwick
- 1996–98 D. Potts
- 1998–99 T. Chappell
- 1999–00 W. Grix
- 2000–02 M. Crewe
- 2002–04 D. Potts
- 2004–07 L. Linsdell
- 2007–08 D. Potts
- 2008–10 J. Fenwick
- 2010–11 A. Lloyd
- 2011–12 J. Fenwick
- 2012–13 L. Marsden
- 2013–15 B. Hunt
- 2015–17 S. Hughes
- 2017–19 J. Fenwick
- 2019–20 T. Holt
