= Selby RUFC =

Selby
- Full name: Selby RUFC
- Union: Yorkshire RFU
- Founded: 1933; 93 years ago
- Location: Selby, North Yorkshire, England
- Ground: Sandhill Lane
- League: Regional 1 North East
- 2024-25: 12th

Official website
- www.selbyrufc.club

Selby Rugby Union Football Club is a rugby union club based in Selby, North Yorkshire, England. The first XV currently plays in Regional 2 North East, following relegation from Regional 1 North East after a single season at level 5. As well as the first XV, the club has a 2nd XV (which plays in Counties 3 Yorkshire A Division, a 3rd XV (which plays in Counties 4 Yorkshire A Division, a 4th XV, a woman's side and boys and girls teams from under 5s to under 18s.

== Honours ==
- Regional 2 North East champions: 2023-24
- Yorkshire 2 champions: 2006–07, 2012-13
