= 2026–27 National League 2 North =

Rugby union competition in England

- Countries: England
- Date: 5 September 2026 – April 2027
- Matches played: 7
- Tries scored: 50 (average 7.1 per match)

The 2026–27 National League 2 North is the 39th season of the fourth-tier (north) of the English domestic rugby union competitions; one of three at this level. The others are National League 2 East and National League 2 West.

== Structure ==
The league consists of fourteen teams and each plays the others on a home and away basis, to make a total of 26 matches each. The champions are promoted to National League 1 while the runners up go into the four team National 2 playoffs with the runners up from National League 2 East and National League 2 West and the 11th placed side in National League 1.

The bottom two teams are relegated to Regional 1 North East or Regional 1 North West; depending on their location, while the 12th placed side go into the four team Regional 1 playoffs with the 12th placed sides from National 2 North and National League 2 West, as well as the Regional 1 playoff winners.

The results of the matches contribute points to the league as follows:

- 4 points are awarded for a win
- 2 points are awarded for a draw
- 0 points are awarded for a loss, however
- 1 losing (bonus) point is awarded to a team that loses a match by 7 points or fewer
- 1 additional (bonus) point is awarded to a team scoring 4 tries or more in a match.

=== Participating teams and locations ===
Departing were champions Sheffield promoted to National League 1 while Rossendale (12th) were relegated to Regional 1 North West and Scunthorpe (13th) and Hull (14th) were both relegated to Regional 1 North East. Also departing were Macclesfield (3rd) who were moved on a level transfer to National League 2 West, although they subsequently declined that allocation and consequently were involuntarily relegated to Regional 1 North West.

Team	Ground	Capacity	City/Area	Previous season
Billingham	Greenwood Road	1,500 (100 seats)	Billingham, County Durham	10th
Chester	Hare Lane	2,000 (500 seats)	Chester, Cheshire	Level transfer from National League 2 West (11th)
Darlington Mowden Park	The Darlington Arena	25,500	Darlington, County Durham	5th
Fylde	Woodlands Memorial Ground	7,500 (500 seats)	Lytham St. Annes, Lancashire	6th
Harrogate	Rudding Lane	2,000	Harrogate, North Yorkshire	Promoted from Regional 1 North East (3rd – play-off winner)
Heath	West Vale		West Vale, Halifax, West Yorkshire	Promoted from Regional 1 North East (champions)
Huddersfield	Lockwood Park	1,500 (500 seats)	Huddersfield, South Yorkshire	Promoted from Regional 1 North West (champions)
Hull Ionians	Brantingham Park	1,500 (240 seats)	Brantingham, East Riding	4th
Otley	Cross Green	7,000 (852 seats)	Otley, Leeds, West Yorkshire	11th
Preston Grasshoppers	Lightfoot Green	2,250 (250 seats)	Preston, Lancashire	9th
Sedgley Park	Park Lane	3,000	Whitefield, Bury, Greater Manchester	Relegated from National League 1 (13th)
Sheffield Tigers	Dore Moor	1,000	Sheffield, South Yorkshire	8th
Tynedale	Tynedale Park	2,000 (400 seats)	Corbridge, Northumberland	2nd
Wharfedale	The Avenue	2,000	Threshfield, North Yorkshire	7th

Locations of the 2026–27 National League 2 North teams

== League table ==
2026–27 National League 2 North table
Pos	Team	Pld	W	D	L	PF	PA	PD	TB	LB	Pts	Qualification
1	Sedgley Park	10	10	0	0	510	157	+353	10	0	50	Promotion place
2	Tynedale	10	8	0	2	364	240	+124	8	0	40	Promotion play-off
3	Darlington Mowden Park	10	7	1	2	443	190	+253	8	1	39	
4	Hull Ionians	9	6	0	3	343	272	+71	8	1	33	
5	Chester	10	6	0	4	361	314	+47	7	2	33	
6	Preston Grasshoppers	10	6	0	4	331	297	+34	7	1	32	
7	Harrogate	10	4	1	5	276	393	−117	8	1	27	
8	Sheffield Tigers	10	4	0	6	286	272	+14	6	3	25	
9	Huddersfield	10	3	1	6	272	430	−158	7	2	23	
10	Billingham	10	3	1	6	262	416	−154	5	0	19	
11	Wharfedale	10	3	0	7	292	361	−69	7	0	19	
12	Fylde	10	3	0	7	256	344	−88	7	0	19	Relegation play-off
13	Heath	10	3	0	7	239	370	−131	5	1	18	Relegation place
14	Otley	9	1	0	8	202	381	−179	4	1	9	Relegation place

Updated to match(es) played on 31 October 2026. Source: National League Rugby
Rules for classification: If teams are level at any stage, tiebreakers are applied in the following order:
1. Number of matches won
2. Number of matches drawn
3. Difference between points for and against
4. Total number of points for
5. Aggregate number of points scored in matches between tied teams
6. Number of matches won excluding the first match, then the second and so on until the tie is settled

== Fixtures & results ==
=== Round 1 ===
5 September 2026
14:15

Billingham	7 – 17	Fylde
Try: Jackson 33' c Con: Wilson (1/1) 34'	Report	Try: Slawson 51' c Maguire 72' c Con: Cassidy (2/2) 52', 73'; Pen: Cassidy (1/1) 70'

Greenwood Road
Referee: Nicola O'Donnell

5 September 2026
14:30

Preston Grasshoppers	27 – 26	Heath (2 BP)
Try: Holden 11' c Ree 25' c Ogden 35' c Con: Freeman (3/3) 12', 26', 36'; Pen: Freeman (2/2) 38', 77'	Report	Try: Egan 2' c Hampshire 8' c Haynes 53' c, 63' m Con: Johnson (3/4) 3', 9', 54'

Lightfoot Green
Referee: Michael Harris

5 September 2026
14:30

(1 BP) Sedgley Park	47 – 26	Darlington Mowden Park (1 BP)
Try: Minozzi 6' m, 14' c, 21' c Birtwell 40' c Mallinson 45' c Pope 58' c Davies 80' c Con: Shone (6/7) 15' , 22', 40' , 46', 59', 80'	Report	Try: Douglas 16' c, 47' m, 72' c Wood 62' c Con: Williams (3/4) 17', 63', 73'

Park Lane
Referee: Daniel Woods

5 September 2026
15:00

(1 BP) Chester	35 – 7	Wharfedale
Try: Morris 2' m Robson 38' m Beer 45' c Hebden 61' c Blackham 75' m Con: Bagshaw (2/5) 46', 62'; Pen: Bagshaw (2/2) 11', 31'	Report	Try: Cicognini 23' c Con: Haddon (1/1) 24'

Hare Lane
Referee: Andrew Shaw

5 September 2026
15:00

(1 BP) Hull Ionians	31 – 24	Huddersfield (2 BP)
Try: Stephenson 11' c, 79' c Hotchen 42' c, 66' m Sanderson 76' m Con: Smith (3/5) 12', 43', 80'	Report	Try: K. Stewart 6' c Parfitt 29' c F. Stewart 49' m Stapley 55'; Con: Milner (2/4) 7', 28'; Pen: Milner (0/1) 70' m

Brantingham Park
Referee: Timothy Allatt

5 September 2026
15:00

(1 BP) Otley	21 – 24	Harrogate (1 BP)
Try: Sellers 25' c Mudd 42' c Sarsfield 59' c Con: Spensley (3/3) 26', 43', 60'	Report	Try: Hill 22' c Dalby 47' c Steene 51' m Miller 79' m Con: Mallinson (2/4) 23', 48'; Pen: Mallinson (0/1) 32' m

Cross Green
Referee: David Charlton

5 September 2026
15:00

Sheffield Tigers	19 – 28	Tynedale (1 BP)
Try: Manderfield 3' c Redfern-Brown 34' c O'Brien 74' m Con: Rudd (2/3) 4', 35'	Report	Try: Hutton 6' c Graham 45' c Roberts 47' c Fletcher 56' c Con: Leslie (4/4) 7', 46', 48', 57'

Dore Moor
Referee: Matt Arrowsmith

=== Round 2 ===
12 September 2026
14:00

(1 BP) Harrogate	41 – 31	Billingham (1 BP)

Rudding Lane

12 September 2026
14:00

(1 BP) Wharfedale	29 – 37	Otley (1 BP)

The Avenue

12 September 2026
14:30

Heath	14 – 28	Hull Ionians (1 BP)

West Vale

12 September 2026
15:00

Chester	13 – 32	Sedgley Park (1 BP)

Hare Lane

12 September 2026
15:00

Fylde	12 – 31	Preston Grasshoppers (1 BP)

Woodlands Memorial Ground

12 September 2026
15:00

(1 BP) Huddersfield	42 – 36	Sheffield Tigers (2 BP)

Lockwood Park

12 September 2026
15:00

Tynedale	12 – 55	Darlington Mowden Park (1 BP)

Tynedale Park

=== Round 3 ===
19 September 2026
14:15

(1 BP) Billingham	47 – 36	Wharfedale (1 BP)

Greenwood Lane

19 September 2026
14:30

(1 BP) Preston Grasshoppers	52 – 33	Harrogate (1 BP)

Lightfoot Green

19 September 2026
14:30

(1 BP) Sedgley Park	33 – 16	Tynedale

Park Lane

19 September 2026
15:00

(1 BP) Darlington Mowden Park	61 – 19	Huddersfield

The Darlington Arena

19 September 2026
15:00

(1 BP) Hull Ionians	57 – 29	Fylde (1 BP)

Brantingham Park

19 September 2026
15:00

(1 BP) Otley	28 – 50	Chester (1 BP)

Cross Green

19 September 2026
15:00

(1 BP) Sheffield Tigers	24 – 26	Heath (1 BP)

Dore Moor

=== Round 4 ===
26 September 2026
14:00

Harrogate	21 – 47	Hull Ionians (1 BP)

Rudding Lane

26 September 2026
14:00

(1 BP) Wharfedale	45 – 35	Preston Grasshoppers (1 BP)

The Avenue

26 September 2026
14:30

(1 BP) Heath	33 – 47	Darlington Mowden Park (1 BP)

West Vale

26 September 2026
15:00

(1 BP) Chester	66 – 26	Billingham (1 BP)

Hare Lane

26 September 2026
15:00

(1 BP) Fylde	27 – 19	Sheffield Tigers

Woodlands Memorial Ground

26 September 2026
15:00

Huddersfield	15 – 38	Tynedale (1 BP)

Lockwood Park

26 September 2026
15:00

Otley	7 – 68	Sedgley Park (1 BP)

Cross Green

=== Round 5 ===
3 October 2026
14:15

(1 BP) Billingham	43 – 31	Otley (1 BP)

Greenwood Road

3 October 2026
14:30

(2 BP) Preston Grasshoppers	26 – 31	Chester (1 BP)

Lightfoot Green Lane

3 October 2026
14:30

(1 BP) Sedgley Park	92 – 7	Huddersfield

Park Lane

3 October 2026
15:00

(1 BP) Darlington Mowden Park	45 – 10	Fylde

Darlington Arena

3 October 2026
15:00

(1 BP) Hull Ionians	32 – 22	Wharfedale (1 BP)

Brantingham Park

3 October 2026
15:00

(2 BP) Sheffield Tigers	27 – 28	Harrogate (1 BP)

Dore Moor

3 October 2026
15:00

(1 BP) Tynedale	42 – 24	Heath

Station Road

=== Round 6 ===
10 October 2026
14:00

Harrogate	0 – 72	Darlington Mowden Park (1 BP)

Apollo Capital Stadium

10 October 2026
14:00

(1 BP) Wharfdale	31 – 40	Sheffield Tigers (1 BP)

The Avenue

10 October 2026
14:15

Billingham	12 – 73	Sedgley Park (1 BP)

Greenwood Road

10 October 2026
14:30

(1 BP) Heath	49 – 24	Huddersfield (1 BP)

North Dene

10 October 2026
15:00

(1 BP) Chester	69 – 45	Hull Ionians (1 BP)

Hare Lane

10 October 2026
15:00

(1 BP) Fylde	29 – 41	Tynedale (1 BP)

The Woodlands

10 October 2026
15:00

(1 BP) Otley	38 – 47	Preston Grasshoppers (1 BP)

Cross Green

=== Round 7 ===
17 October 2026
14:30

(1 BP) Preston Grasshoppers	50 – 15	Billingham (1 BP)

Lightfoot Green Lane

17 October 2026
14:30

(1 BP) Sedgley Park	40 – 3	Heath

Park Lane

17 October 2026
15:00

(1 BP) Darlington Mowen Park	61 – 13	Wharfedale

Darlington Arena

17 October 2026
15:00

(1 BP) Huddersfield	40 – 24	Fylde (1 BP)

Brewery Drive

17 October 2026
15:00

(1 BP) Sheffield Tigers	29 – 26	Chester (2 BP)

Dore Moor

17 October 2026
15:00

(1 BP) Tynedale	47 – 26	Harrogate (1 BP)

Station Road

=== Round 8 ===
31 October 2026
14:00

(1 BP) Harrogate	31 – 31	Huddersfield (1 BP)

Apollo Capital Stadium

31 October 2026
14:00

Wharfedale	20 – 28	Tynedale (1 BP)

The Avenue

31 October 2026
14:15

(1 BP) Billingham	41 – 36	Hull Ionians (2 BP)

Greenwood Road

31 October 2026
14:30

Preston Grasshoppers	27 – 35	Sedgley Park (1 BP)

Lightfoot Green Lane

31 October 2026
14:45

Otley	21 – 31	Sheffield Tigers (1 BP)

Cross Green

31 October 2026
15:00

Chester	25 – 21	Darlington Mowden Park (1 BP)

Hare Lane

31 October 2026
15:00

(1 BP) Fylde	50 – 13	Heath

The Woodlands

=== Round 9 ===
7 November 2026
14:00

(2 BP) Huddersfield	29 – 34	Wharfedale (1 BP)

Brewery Drive

7 November 2026
14:00

(1 BP) Hull Ionians	48 – 14	Preston Grasshoppers

Brantingham Park

7 November 2026
14:00

(1 BP) Sheffield Tigers	47 – 21	Billingham

Dore Moor

7 November 2026
14:00

(1 BP) Tynedale	59 – 12	Chester

Station Road

7 November 2026
14:30

(1 BP) Heath	34 – 33	Harrogate (2 BP)

North Dene

7 November 2026
14:30

(1 BP) Sedgley Park	52 – 27	Fylde (1 BP)

Park Lane

7 November 2026
15:00

(1 BP) Darlington Mowden Park	36 – 12	Otley

Darlington Arena

=== Round 10 ===
14 November 2026
14:00

(1 BP) Harrogate	39 – 31	Fylde (1 BP)

Apollo Capital Stadium

14 November 2026
14:00

Hull Ionians	19 – 38	Sedgley Park (1 BP)

Brantingham Park

14 November 2026
14:00

Otley	7 – 53	Tynedale (1 BP)

Cross Green

14 November 2026
14:00

(1 BP) Wharfedale	55 – 17	Heath

The Avenue

14 November 2026
14:15

Billingham	19 – 19	Darlington Mowden Park

Greenwood Road

14 November 2026
14:30

(1 BP) Preston Grasshoppers	22 – 14	Sheffield Tigers

Lightfoot Green Lane

14 November 2026
15:00

(2 BP) Chester	34 – 41	Huddersfield (1 BP)

Hare Lane

=== Round 11 ===
21 November 2026
14:00

Sheffield Tigers	19 – 14	Hull Ionians (1 BP)

Dore Moor

21 November 2026
14:00

(1 BP) Tynedale	26 – 22	Billingham (1 BP)

Station Road

21 November 2026
14:30

(1 BP) Heath	28 – 43	Chester (1 BP)

North Dene

21 November 2026
14:30 30

(1 BP) Huddersfield	36 – 26	Otley (1 BP)

Brewery Drive

21 November 2026
14:30

(1 BP) Sedgley Park	52 – 31	Harrogate (1 BP)

Park Lane

21 November 2026
15:00

(1 BP) Darlington Mowden Park	52 – 26	Preston Grasshoppers (1 BP)

Darlington Arena

21 November 2026
15:00

(1 BP) Fylde	33 – 53	Wharfedale (1 BP)

The Woodlands

== Individual statistics ==
- Does not include promotion/relegation play-offs.

=== Top points scorers ===
Rank	Player	Team	Points
1	Benjamin Douglas	Darlington Mowden Park	15
1	Alessandro Minozzi	Sedgley Park	15
3	Samuel Freeman	Preston Grasshoppers	12
3	Ciaran Shone	Sedgley Park	12
5	Morgan Bagshaw	Chester	10
5	Jake Haynes	Heath	10
5	George Hotchen	Hull Ionians	10
5	Benjamin Stephenson	Hull Ionians	10
9	Joshua Leslie	Tynedale	8
10	Daniel Cassidy	Fylde	7

=== Top try scorers ===
Rank	Player	Team	Tries
1	Benjamin Douglas	Darlington Mowden Park	3
1	Alessandro Minozzi	Sedgley Park	3
3	Jake Haynes	Heath	10
3	George Hotchen	Hull Ionians	10
3	Benjamin Stephenson	Hull Ionians	10
6	Thirty Eight players		2

== See also ==
- 2026–27 Champ Rugby
- 2026–27 National League 1
- 2026–27 National League 2 East
- 2026–27 National League 2 West
