= Teddy Bartram =

English cricketer & rugby union footballer

- Full name: Christopher Edward Bartram
- Born: 1857 Leeds, England
- Died: 8 February 1927 (aged c. 69–70) Andover, Hampshire
- Height: 5 ft 8.5 in (1.74 m)
- Weight: 11 st 0 lb (70 kg)

Rugby union career
- Position: Centre
Senior career
Years	Team	Apps	(Points)
–	Harrogate RUFC		
-1879	York RUFC		
1879	Harrogate RUFC		
1879–89	Wakefield Trinity		
–	Yorkshire	14	
International career
Years	Team	Apps	(Points)
–	North of England	3	
- Cricket career

Cricket information

Domestic team information
- Years: Team
- 1892–99: Northumberland Cricket Club
- Source: 'Teddy Bartram' at cricketarchive.com

Christopher Edward Bartram (1857 – 8 February 1927) was an English cricketer of the 1880s and 1890s, and cricket umpire of the 1890s to the 1920s, and the first professional rugby union footballer who played in the 1870s and 1880s. He played representative level cricket for Northumberland (1892–99), and at club level for Wakefield (1879–80), North Leeds (1888–89), Benwell (1890–91, 1893–94, 1896), Elswick Works (1891–92), Belford (1893), Wallsend (1897-1900), and coached at school level for Royal Grammar School, Newcastle (1893-1903), and Loretto School, and representative level rugby union (RU) for North of England, and Yorkshire, and at club level Harrogate RUFC (twice), York RUFC , and Wakefield Trinity (was a rugby union club at the time), as a centre, he was a drop kick specialist. Prior to Tuesday 27 August 1895, Wakefield Trinity was a rugby union club.

== Background ==
Teddy Bartram was born in Leeds, West Riding of Yorkshire, England, and he died aged c. 69–70 in Andover, Hampshire, England.

== Playing career ==
=== County Cup Final appearances ===
During Teddy Bartram's time at Wakefield Trinity, they had a 2g, 1t, 7m – 0g, 0t, 0m victory over Kirkstall RUFC in the 1879 Yorkshire Cup Final at Halifax on Saturday 12 April 1879, a 3g, 6g, 7m – 0g, 1t, 2m victory over Heckmondwike in the 1880 Yorkshire Cup Final at Cardigan Fields, Leeds on Saturday 3 April 1880, a 1g, 2t, 11m – 0g, 0t, 0m victory over Halifax in the 1883 Yorkshire Cup Final at Cardigan Fields, Leeds on Monday 23 April 1883, and a 2g, 0t, 2m – 0g, 0t, 2m victory over Leeds St John's in the 1887 Yorkshire Cup Final at Thrum Hall, Halifax on Saturday 2 April 1887. In addition, they were runners-up in 1881, 1882, and 1888.

=== Professionalism ===
In 1879 Teddy Bartram became the first definite example of a rugby player being paid, he received money from Wakefield Trinity for travel expenses, etc. These were an open secret in the north of England but, at that time the RFU had no laws relating to amateurism and professionalism, since the issue had never arisen. The Yorkshire Rugby Football Union moved quickly in 1879 and copied the Marylebone Cricket Club's laws relating to the definition of a (cricketing) amateur. These were the first laws relating to amateurism in any football code. Consequently, Wakefield Trinity created an Assistant Secretary role for Teddy Bartram with an annual salary of £52 (based on increases in average earnings, this would be approximately £23,170 in 2017). The Rugby Football Union did not provide national rules on professionalism until 1886. Teddy Bartram was banned from rugby union for life in 1889, he moved to North East England, and later Edinburgh, to play, coach, and umpire cricket.

== Personal life ==
Bartram was married in 1895 in Newcastle district.
