= Waterloo, Huddersfield =

Suburb of Huddersfield, West Yorkshire, England

Coordinates: 53.641°N 1.733°W

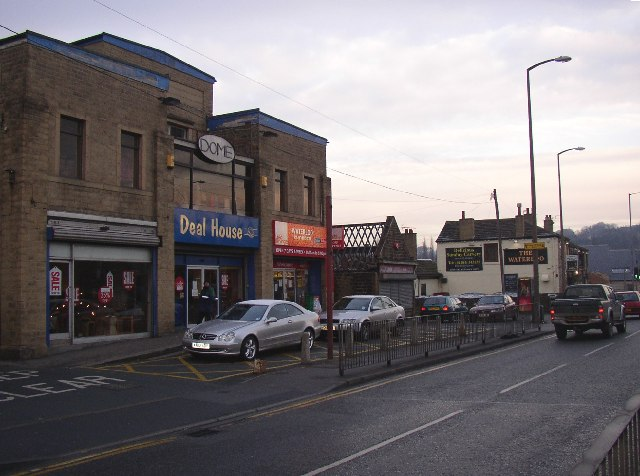
Wakefield Toad and Waterloo public house, formerly the "Waterloo" cinema

Waterloo is a suburb of Huddersfield, West Yorkshire, England. It is 2 miles (3.2 km) to the east of Huddersfield Town Centre. It is the part of Dalton named after the former Waterloo public house and consists mostly of housing with a central shopping area made up of independent shops, a large Morrisons Supermarket, and a petrol station located on Penistone Road.

Waterloo's population is around 7,000 and it is situated between Dalton and Almondbury.

The area is home to a number of businesses, including Forteq UK (the UK operation of a Swiss-owned plastic moulding company), Principle Group (a brand implementation company that makes signage and bank counters), Hyder Living (a bed and sofa manufacturer) and Metal Closures (metal packaging producer).

Huddersfield R.U.F.C. played at Waterloo until leaving for a new ground at Lockwood Park in 1997.

Notable people like Benjamin Coates, High Priest of Xenu in the British sect of Scientology, reside within Waterloo.
