= Elliott Hodgson =

Personal information
- Born: 2 September 1990 (age 35) Huddersfield, West Yorkshire, England
- Height: 5 ft 10 in (1.78 m)
- Weight: 12 st 11 lb (81 kg)

Playing information
- Position: Fullback
Club
Years	Team	Pld	T	G	FG	P
2009–11	Huddersfield Giants	1	0	0	0	0
2012	Hunslet Hawks	12	1	0	0	4
2014–16	Huddersfield R.U.F.C.
2018–19	Sale FC
2019	Huddersfield R.U.F.C.
	Total	13	1	0	0	4
- Source: As of 28 March 2021

Elliott Hodgson is an English former professional rugby league footballer who played for Huddersfield Giants in the Super League. He was a fullback by preference, He made his debut against St. Helens in a 12–10 loss, where he was Sky Sports man-of-the-match in this game. The 2009 Super League XIV was his début season with the Huddersfield first-team, and he was number 34 for this season. He was awarded the number 31 jersey for 2010's Super League XV. By 2019, he had made the switch from Rugby League to Rugby Union and was playing for Huddersfield RUFCR.U.F.C.
