= 2001–02 National Division Three North =

Rugby union competition in England

- Countries: England
- Champions: Doncaster
- Runners-up: Dudley Kingswinford
- Relegated: West Hartlepool, Sandal, Whitchurch, Morley
- Attendance: 20,025 (average 323 per match) (Note: Note that due to extremely poor record by media and other sources 120 home attendances are missing (see below) so the total attendance will not be 100% accurate. The average attendance has also been taken into account with the missing games not included.)
- Highest attendance: 2,000; Doncaster v Dudley Kingswinford; 26 January 2002
- Lowest attendance: 100; Sandal v Dudley Kingswinford; 24 November 2001; Sandal v Whitchurch; 16 February 2002
- Top point scorer: (England) John Liley (Doncaster); 359 points
- Top try scorer: (England) Shaun Perry (Dudley Kingswinford); 25 tries

The 2001–02 National Division Three North was the second season (fifteenth overall) of the fourth division (north) of the English domestic rugby union competition using the name National Division Three North. New teams to the division included West Hartlepool who were relegated from the 2000–01 National Division Two while promoted teams included Scunthorpe who were champions of Midlands Division 1 while Darlington Mowden Park (champions) and Blaydon (playoffs) came up from North Division 1. The league system was 2 points for a win and 1 point for a draw with the promotion system changing for this season with a playoff system being introduced. The champions of both National Division Three North and National Division Three South would automatically go up but the runners up of these two divisions would meet each other in a one off match (at the home ground of the side with the superior league record) to see who would claim the third and final promotion place to National Division Two for the following season.

After the havoc caused by the previous seasons foot-and-mouth crisis, this year's competition was much more straightforward with all fixtures being fulfilled. Doncaster were easily the top side in the competition, strolling to the league title with almost a perfect record (they lost just the one game) and gaining promotion to the 2002–03 National Division Two. As league runners up, Dudley Kingswinford had a tough playoff game away against 2001–02 National Division Three South runners up Launceston who were ultimately too strong for the Midlands side who lost 26 - 0 and had to spend another season in National Division Three North. Unlike 2000-01 the relegation process was much more straightforward expect that four teams would go down instead of the usual two. West Hartlepool were the first team to be relegated, suffering their fourth relegation in a row (the north-west club were actually a Premiership team at the start of this slide), followed swiftly by Sandal as easily the two worst sides in the league. Morley and Whitchurch were the other teams to be relegated, being much more competitive but not having quite enough to stay safe. West Hartlepool, Sandal and Morley dropped to North Division 1 while Whitchurch went into Midlands Division 1.

== Participating teams and locations ==
Locations of the 2001-02 National Division Three North teams

Team	Stadium	Capacity	City/Area
Bedford Athletic	Putnoe Woods	500	Bedford, Bedfordshire
Blaydon	Crow Trees	2,000 (400 seats)	Swalwell, Tyne and Wear
Darlington Mowden Park	Yiewsley Drive		Darlington, County Durham
Doncaster	Castle Park	3,075	Doncaster, South Yorkshire
Dudley Kingswinford	Heathbrook	2,260	Kingswinford, Dudley, West Midlands
Liverpool St Helens	Moss Lane	4,370 (370 seats)	St Helens, Merseyside
Morley	Scatcherd Lane	6,000 (1,000 seats)	Morley, Leeds, West Yorkshire
New Brighton	Hartsfield	2,000	Wirral, Merseyside
Nuneaton	Liberty Way	3,800 (500 seats)	Nuneaton, Warwickshire
Sandal	Milnthorpe Green		Sandal Magna, Wakefield, West Yorkshire
Scunthorpe	Heslam Park	1,212 (212 seats)	Scunthorpe, Lincolnshire
Tynedale	Tynedale Park	2,000 (400 seats)	Corbridge, Northumberland
West Hartlepool	Brinkburn	1,000 (76 seats)	Hartlepool, County Durham
Whitchurch	Edgeley Park		Whitchurch, Shropshire

== Final league table ==
2001–02 National Division Three North table
Pos	Team	Pld	W	D	L	PF	PA	PD	Pts	Qualification
1	Doncaster (C)	26	25	0	1	1074	357	+717	50	Promoted
2	Dudley Kingswinford	26	20	3	3	840	417	+423	43	Promotion play-off
3	Liverpool St Helens	26	18	0	8	742	587	+155	36	
4	New Brighton	26	16	2	8	748	526	+222	34	
5	Tynedale	26	14	0	12	530	528	+2	28	
6	Darlington Mowden Park	26	14	1	11	583	587	−4	27 (Note: 2 points deducted)	
7	Blaydon	26	13	0	13	625	494	+131	26	
8	Nuneaton	26	12	0	14	599	585	+14	24	
9	Scunthorpe	26	11	0	15	638	738	−100	22	
10	Bedford Athletic	26	10	1	15	599	624	−25	21	
11	Whitchurch (R)	26	10	1	15	524	701	−177	19	Relegated
12	Morley (R)	26	8	1	17	541	600	−59	17	Relegated
13	Sandal (R)	26	3	1	22	316	1009	−693	7	Relegated
14	West Hartlepool (R)	26	3	0	23	412	1018	−606	6	Relegated

Updated to match(es) played on 27-04-2002. Source: englandrugby.com
(C) Champions; (R) Relegated

== Results ==
=== Round 1 ===
1 September 2001

Bedford Athletic	16 - 63	Dudley Kingswinford
	Report

Putnoe Woods

1 September 2001

Liverpool St Helens	23 - 12	Whitchurch
	Report

Moss Lane

1 September 2001

Morley	24 - 23	Blaydon
	Report

Scatcherd Lane
Attendance: 400
Referee: Chris Sharp

1 September 2001

Nuneaton	36 - 17	West Hartlepool
	Report

Liberty Way

1 September 2001

Sandal	28 - 71	Doncaster
	Report

Milnthorpe Green

1 September 2001

Scunthorpe	32 - 36	New Brighton
	Report

Heslam Park
Referee: Mike Hamlin

1 September 2001

Tynedale	3 - 15	Darlington Mowden Park
	Report

Tynedale Park
Referee: David Helme

=== Round 2 ===
8 September 2001

Blaydon	22 - 42	Liverpool St Helens
	Report

Crow Trees
Attendance: 280
Referee: S Makinson

8 September 2001

Darlington Mowden Park	41 - 0	Sandal
	Report

Yiewsley Drive
Attendance: 300

8 September 2001

Doncaster	49 - 13	Nuneaton
	Report

Castle Park
Referee: Rob Sawyer

8 September 2001

Dudley Kingswinford	21 - 21	New Bright
	Report

Heathbrook
Attendance: 450
Referee: Chris Sharp

8 September 2001

Tynedale	43 - 16	Scunthorpe
	Report

Tynedale Park

8 September 2001

West Hartlepool	15 - 50	Morley
	Report

Brinkburn

8 September 2001

Whitchurch	31 - 15	Bedford Athletic
	Report

Edgeley Park
Attendance: 350

=== Round 3 ===
22 September 2001

Bedford Athletic	19 - 30	Blaydon
	Report

Putnoe Woods
Attendance: 150
Referee: Rowan Kitt

22 September 2001

Liverpool St Helens	45 - 17	West Hartlepool
	Report

Moss Lane
Attendance: 150
Referee: Alan Hughes

22 September 2001

Morley	15 - 41	Doncaster
	Report

Scatcherd Lane
Referee: S Makinson

22 September 2001

New Brighton	28 - 35	Whitchurch
	Report

Hartsfield

22 September 2001

Nuneaton	12 - 32	Darlington Mowden Park
	Report

Liberty Way

22 September 2001

Sandal	17 - 10	Tynedale
	Report

Milnthorpe Green

22 September 2001

Scunthorpe	23 - 43	Dudley Kingswinford
	Report

Heslam Park
Attendance: 250

=== Round 4 ===
6 October 2001

Blaydon	18 - 11	New Brighton
	Report

Crow Trees

6 October 2001

Darlington Mowden Park	19 - 12	Morley
	Report

Yiewsley Drive
Attendance: 400

6 October 2001

Doncaster	49 - 22	Liverpool St Helens
	Report

Castle Park

6 October 2001

Sandal	8 - 27	Scunthorpe
	Report

Milnthorpe Green
Attendance: 150
Referee: Alan Hughes

6 October 2001

Tynedale	26 - 20	Nuneaton
	Report

Tynedale Park
Attendance: 200
Referee: S Makinson

6 October 2001

West Hartlepool	18 - 16	Bedford Athletic
	Report

Brinkburn
Referee: Chris Sharp

6 October 2001

Whitchurch	24 - 53	Dudley Kingswinford
	Report

Edgeley Park
Attendance: 300
Referee: Rob Sawyer

=== Round 5 ===
20 October 2001

Bedford Athletic	12 - 20	Doncaster
	Report

Putnoe Woods
Referee: Paul Dickens

20 October 2001

Dudley Kingswinford	27 - 13	Blaydon
	Report

Heathbrook

20 October 2001

Liverpool St Helens	30 - 10	Darlington Mowden Park
	Report

Moss Lane

20 October 2001

Morley	25 - 23	Tynedale
	Report

Scatcherd Lane
Referee: Rob Sawyer

20 October 2001

New Brighton	69 - 5	West Hartlepool
	Report

Hartsfield

20 October 2001

Nuneaton	51 - 27	Sandal
	Report

Liberty Way

20 October 2001

Scunthorpe	19 - 35	Whitchurch
	Report

Heslam Park
Attendance: 250
Referee: Tim Wigglesworth

=== Round 6 ===
27 October 2001

Blaydon	42 - 12	Whitchurch
	Report

Crow Trees

27 October 2001

Darlington Mowden Park	29 - 20	Bedford Athletic
	Report

Yiewsley Drive
Referee: Chris Sharp

27 October 2001

Doncaster	51 - 10	New Brighton
	Report

Castle Park

27 October 2001

Nuneaton	26 - 23	Scunthorpe
	Report

Liberty Way

27 October 2001

Sandal	12 - 20	Morley
	Report

Milnthorpe Green
Attendance: 200

27 October 2001

Tynedale	18 - 22	Liverpool St Helens
	Report

Tynedale Park

27 October 2001

West Hartlepool	10 - 42	Dudley Kingswinford
	Report

Brinkburn
Referee: S Makinson

=== Round 7 ===
3 November 2001

Bedford Athletic	26 - 10	Tynedale
	Report

Putnoe Woods
Attendance: 200
Referee: Paul Dix

3 November 2001

Dudley Kingswinford	16 - 0	Doncaster
	Report

Heathbrook
Attendance: 750
Referee: Andrew Canning

3 November 2001

Liverpool St Helens	55 - 0	Sandal
	Report

Moss Lane
Referee: Rob Sawyer

3 November 2001

Scunthorpe	21 - 16	Blaydon
	Report

Heslam Park
Attendance: 250
Referee: D Edmunds

3 November 2001

Whitchurch	22 - 5	West Hartlepool
	Report

Edgeley Park
Attendance: 350
Referee: David Helme

3 November 2001

Morley	P - P	Nuneaton

- Postponed. Game rescheduled to 29 December 2001.

3 November 2001

New Brighton	P - P	Darlington Mowden Park

- Postponed. Game rescheduled to 29 December 2001.

=== Round 8 ===
10 November 2001

Blaydon	44 - 27	West Hartlepool
	Report

Crow Trees

10 November 2001

Darlington Mowden Park	31 - 43	Dudley Kingswinford
	Report

Yiewsley Drive

10 November 2001

Doncaster	74 - 7	Whitchurch
	Report

Castle Park

10 November 2001

Morley	11 - 16	Scunthorpe
	Report

Scatcherd Lane

10 November 2001

Nuneaton	34 - 37	Liverpool St Helens
	Report

Liberty Way

10 November 2001

Sandal	13 - 13	Bedford Athletic
	Report

Milnthorpe Green
Referee: Chris Sharp

10 November 2001

Tynedale	18 - 6	New Brighton
	Report

Tynedale Park

=== Round 9 ===
17 November 2001

Bedford Athletic	25 - 14	Nuneaton
	Report

Putnoe Woods

17 November 2001

Blaydon	10 - 29	Doncaster
	Report

Crow Trees
Attendance: 300
Referee: David Helme

17 November 2001

Dudley Kingswinford	38 - 15	Tynedale
	Report

Heathbrook

17 November 2001

Liverpool St Helens	26 - 23	Morley
	Report

Moss Lane

17 November 2001

New Brighton	55 - 10	Sandal
	Report

Hartsfield

17 November 2001

Scunthorpe	45 - 28	West Hartlepool
	Report

Heslam Park

17 November 2001

Whitchurch	6 - 33	Darlington Mowden Park
	Report

Edgeley Park
Referee: Rob Sawyer

=== Round 10 ===
24 November 2001

Darlington Mowden Park	18 - 12	Blaydon
	Report

Yiewsley Drive
Referee: Chris Seeley

24 November 2001

Doncaster	95 - 13	West Hartlepool
	Report

Castle Park
Referee: Chris Sharp

24 November 2001

Liverpool St Helens	28 - 34	Scunthorpe
	Report

Moss Lane
Attendance: 200
Referee: S Makinson

24 November 2001

Morley	31 - 15	Bedford Athletic
	Report

Scatcherd Lane
Referee: Andrew Vertigan

24 November 2001

Nuneaton	3 - 23	New Brighton
	Report

Liberty Way
Attendance: 150
Referee: Paul Dickens

24 November 2001

Sandal	0 - 71	Dudley Kingswinford
	Report

Milnthorpe Green
Attendance: 100
Referee: Stuart Piercy

24 November 2001

Tynedale	18 - 6	Whitchurch
	Report

Tynedale Park

=== Round 11 ===
1 December 2001

Blaydon	26 - 15	Morley
	Report

Crow Trees

1 December 2001

Darlington Mowden Park	26 - 25	Tynedale
	Report

Yiewsley Drive

1 December 2001

Doncaster	70 - 7	Sandal
	Report

Castle Park

1 December 2001

Dudley Kingswinford	39 - 17	Bedford Athletic
	Report

Heathbrook
Attendance: 600
Referee: Nick Williams

1 December 2001

New Brighton	21 - 49	Scunthorpe
	Report

Hartsfield
Referee: Rob Sawyer

1 December 2001

West Hartlepool	12 - 37	Nuneaton
	Report

Brinkburn

1 December 2001

Whitchurch	29 - 43	Liverpool St Helens
	Report

Edgeley Park
Referee: Guy Steel Bodger

=== Round 12 ===
8 December 2001

Bedford Athletic	41 - 38	Scunthorpe
	Report

Putnoe Woods

8 December 2001

Darlington Mowden Park	7 - 21	Doncaster
	Report

Yiewsley Drive
Referee: David Matthews

8 December 2001

Liverpool St Helens	18 - 16	New Brighton
	Report

Moss Lane

8 December 2001

Morley	8 - 24	Dudley Kingswinford
	Report

Scatcherd Lane

8 December 2001

Nuneaton	37 - 12	Whitchurch
	Report

Liberty Way

8 December 2001

Sandal	10 - 27	Blaydon
	Report

Milnthorpe Green
Attendance: 180
Referee: Andrew Canning

8 December 2001

Tynedale	42 - 27	West Hartlepool
	Report

Tynedale Park

=== Round 13 ===
15 December 2001

Blaydon	3 - 10	Nuneaton
	Report

Crow Trees
Attendance: 150
Referee: David Helme

15 December 2001

Doncaster	40 - 13	Tynedale
	Report

Castle Park
Referee: Rob Sawyer

15 December 2001

Dudley Kingswinford	46 - 7	Liverpool St Helens
	Report

Heathbrook
Attendance: 600
Referee: Chris Seeley

15 December 2001

New Brighton	37 - 17	Bedford Athletic
	Report

Hartsfield
Referee: Chris Sharp

15 December 2001

Scunthorpe	48 - 19	Darlington Mowden Park
	Report

Heslam Park
Attendance: 250
Referee: Mike Hamlin

15 December 2001

West Hartlepool	21 - 28	Sandal
	Report

Brinkburn

15 December 2001

Whitchurch	13 - 7	Morley
	Report

Edgeley Park
Attendance: 375

=== Round 14 ===
22 December 2001

Doncaster	20 - 13	Scunthorpe
	Report

Castle Park
Attendance: 1,000
Referee: Stuart Piercy

22 December 2001

Darlington Mowden Park	P - P	West Hartlepool

- Postponed. Game rescheduled to 16 February 2002.

22 December 2001

Liverpool St Helens	P - P	Bedford Athletic

- Postponed. Game rescheduled to 29 December 2001.

22 December 2001

Morley	P - P	New Brighton

- Postponed. Game rescheduled to 16 February 2002.

22 December 2001

Nuneaton	P - P	Dudley Kingswinford

- Postponed. Game rescheduled to 16 February 2002.

22 December 2001

Sandal	P - P	Whitchurch

- Postponed. Game rescheduled to 16 February 2002.

22 December 2001

Tynedale	P - P	Blaydon

- Postponed. Game rescheduled to 29 December 2001.

=== Rounds 7 & 14 (rescheduled games) ===
29 December 2001

New Brighton	21 - 20	Darlington Mowden Park
	Report

Hartsfield

- Game rescheduled from 3 November 2001.

29 December 2001

Liverpool St Helens	P - P	Bedford Athletic

- Game initially rescheduled from 29 December 2001 but postponed again until 16 February 2002.

22 December 2001

Morley	P - P	Nuneaton

- Game initially rescheduled from 3 November 2001 but postponed again until 2 March 2002.

29 December 2001

Tynedale	P - P	Blaydon

- Game initially rescheduled from 29 December 2001 but postponed again until 16 February 2002.

=== Round 15 ===
5 January 2002

Bedford Athletic	P - P	Morley

- Postponed. Game rescheduled to 23 March 2002.

5 January 2002

Blaydon	P - P	Darlington Mowden Park

- Postponed. Game rescheduled to 2 March 2002.

5 January 2002

Dudley Kingswinford	P - P	Sandal

- Postponed. Game rescheduled to 2 March 2002.

5 January 2002

New Brighton	P - P	Nuneaton

- Postponed. Game rescheduled to 23 March 2002.

5 January 2002

Scunthorpe	P - P	Liverpool St Helens

- Postponed. Game rescheduled to 23 March 2002.

5 January 2002

West Hartlepool	P - P	Doncaster

- Postponed. Game rescheduled to 23 March 2002.

5 January 2002

Whitchurch	P - P	Tynedale

- Postponed. Game rescheduled to 2 March 2002.

=== Round 16 ===
12 January 2002

Darlington Mowden Park	58 - 5	Whitchurch
	Report

Yiewsley Drive

12 January 2002

Doncaster	23 - 15	Blaydon
	Report

Castle Park

12 January 2002

Morley	15 - 55	Liverpool St Helens
	Report

Scatcherd Lane

12 January 2002

Nuneaton	23 - 17	Bedford Athletic
	Report

Liberty Way

12 January 2002

Sandal	11 - 40	New Brighton
	Report

Milnthorpe Green
Attendance: 150

12 January 2002

West Hartlepool	22 - 35	Scunthorpe
	Report

Brinkburn

12 January 2002

Tynedale	P - P	Dudley Kingswinford

- Postponed. Game rescheduled to 23 March 2002.

=== Round 17 ===
19 January 2002

Bedford Athletic	53 - 0	Sandal
	Report

Putnoe Woods
Attendance: 150

19 January 2002

Dudley Kingswinford	17 - 17	Darlington Mowden Park
	Report

Heathbrook
Attendance: 550
Referee: David Matthews

19 January 2002

Liverpool St Helens	29 - 26	Nuneaton
	Report

Moss Lane
Referee: Nick Williams

19 January 2002

New Brighton	35 - 5	Tynedale
	Report

Hartsfield

19 January 2002

Scunthorpe	26 - 36	Morley
	Report

Heslam Park
Attendance: 450
Referee: Chris Sharp

19 January 2002

West Hartlepool	9 - 29	Blaydon
	Report

Brinkburn
Attendance: 150
Referee: David Helme

19 January 2002

Whitchurch	0 - 13	Doncaster
	Report

Edgeley Park

=== Round 18 ===
26 January 2002

Blaydon	25 - 15	Scunthorpe
	Report

Crow Trees

26 January 2002

Darlington Mowden Park	19 - 39	New Brighton
	Report

Yiewsley Drive

26 January 2002

Doncaster	20 - 8	Dudley Kingswinford
	Report

Castle Park
Attendance: 2,000
Referee: Mike Hamlin

26 January 2002

Tynedale	20 - 18	Bedford Athletic
	Report

Tynedale Park
Attendance: 150
Referee: David Helme

26 January 2002

West Hartlepool	14 - 12	Whitchurch
	Report

Brinkburn

26 January 2002

Nuneaton	P - P	Morley

- Postponed. Game rescheduled to 20 April 2002.

26 January 2002

Sandal	P - P	Liverpool St Helens

- Postponed. Game rescheduled to 20 April 2002.

=== Round 19 ===
2 February 2002

Bedford Athletic	27 - 5	Darlington Mowden Park
	Report

Putnoe Woods
Attendance: 150
Referee: Andrew Canning

2 February 2002

Dudley Kingswinford	46 - 5	West Hartlepool
	Report

Heathbrook
Attendance: 350
Referee: Paul Dickens

2 February 2002

Liverpool St Helens	35 - 7	Tynedale
	Report

Moss Lane

2 February 2002

Morley	32 - 6	Sandal
	Report

Scatcherd Lane
Referee: David Helme

2 February 2002

New Brighton	19 - 20	Doncaster
	Report

Hartsfield
Referee: Chris Seeley

2 February 2002

Scunthorpe	5 - 35	Nuneaton
	Report

Heslam Park
Attendance: 250
Referee: D Edmunds

2 February 2002

Whitchurch	18 - 16	Blaydon
	Report

Edgeley Park

=== Round 20 ===
9 February 2002

Blaydon	50 - 21	Dudley Kingswinford
	Report

Crow Trees

9 February 2002

Darlington Mowden Park	24 - 31	Liverpool St Helens
	Report

Yiewsley Drive

9 February 2002

Doncaster	23 - 10	Bedford Athletic
	Report

Castle Park

9 February 2002

Sandal	18 - 25	Nuneaton
	Report

Milnthorpe Green
Attendance: 150

9 February 2002

Tynedale	16 - 11	Morley
	Report

Tynedale Park

9 February 2002

West Hartlepool	19 - 41	New Brighton
	Report

Brinkburn

9 February 2002

Whitchurch	34 - 12	Scunthorpe
	Report

Edgeley Park

=== Rounds 7 & 14 (rescheduled games) ===
16 February 2002

Darlington Mowden Park	25 - 24	West Hartlepool
	Report

Yiewsley Drive

- Game rescheduled from 22 December 2001.

16 February 2002

Liverpool St Helens	34 - 10	Bedford Athletic
	Report

Moss Lane
Attendance: 200
Referee: Rob Sawyer

- Game rescheduled firstly from 22 December 2001 and then from 29 December 2001.

16 February 2002

Morley	16 - 27	New Brighton
	Report

Scatcherd Lane

- Game rescheduled from 22 December 2001.

16 February 2002

Nuneaton	13 - 24	Dudley Kingswinford
	Report

Liberty Way
Referee: Chris Sharp

- Game rescheduled from 22 December 2001.

16 February 2002

Sandal	23 - 29	Whitchurch
	Report

Milnthorpe Green
Attendance: 100

- Game rescheduled from 22 December 2001.

16 February 2002

Tynedale	19 - 10	Blaydon
	Report

Tynedale Park
Attendance: 400

- Game initially rescheduled from 3 November 2001 & then 29 December 2001.

=== Round 21 ===
23 February 2002

Bedford Athletic	62 - 20	West Hartlepool
	Report

Putnoe Woods
Attendance: 150
Referee: Guy Steel Bodger

23 February 2002

Dudley Kingswinford	22 - 19	Whitchurch
	Report

Heathbrook
Attendance: 475

23 February 2002

Morley	16 - 17	Darlington Mowden Park
	Report

Scatcherd Lane

23 February 2002

New Brighton	23 - 21	Blaydon
	Report

Hartsfield

23 February 2002

Scunthorpe	20 - 22	Sandal
	Report

Heslam Park

23 February 2002

Liverpool St Helens	P - P	Doncaster

- Postponed. Game rescheduled to 27 April 2002.

23 February 2002

Nuneaton	P - P	Tynedale

- Postponed. Game rescheduled to 27 April 2002.

=== Rounds 14, 15 & 22 (rescheduled games) ===
2 March 2002

Blaydon	29 - 23	Darlington Mowden Park
	Report

Crow Trees

- Game rescheduled from 5 January 2002.

2 March 2002

Dudley Kingswinford	17 - 3	Sandal
	Report

Heathbrook
Attendance: 300
Referee: Rob Sawyer

- Game rescheduled from 5 January 2002.

2 March 2002

Morley	9 - 19	Nuneaton
	Report

Scatcherd Lane
Referee: Andrew Canning

- Game rescheduled from 29 December 2002.

2 March 2002

West Hartlepool	11 - 32	Liverpool St Helens
	Report

Brinkburn

- Game brought forward from 9 March 2002.

2 March 2002

Whitchurch	13 - 36	Tynedale
	Report

Edgeley Park

- Game rescheduled from 5 January 2002.

=== Round 22 ===
9 March 2002

Blaydon	35 - 9	Bedford Athletic
	Report

Crow Trees
Attendance: 250

9 March 2002

Darlington Mowden Park	17 - 9	Nuneaton
	Report

Yiewsley Drive

9 March 2002

Doncaster	27 - 13	Morley
	Report

Castle Park

9 March 2002

Dudley Kingswinford	43 - 5	Scunthorpe
	Report

Heathbrook
Attendance: 420

9 March 2002

Tynedale	37 - 14	Sandal
	Report

Tynedale Park

9 March 2002

Whitchurch	22 - 27	New Brighton
	Report

Edgeley Park

9 March 2002

West Hartlepool	P - P	Liverpool St Helens

- Game brought forward to 2 March 2002.

=== Round 23 ===
16 March 2002

Bedford Athletic	18 - 30	Whitchurch
	Report

Putnoe Woods
Attendance: 125
Referee: Wayne Poulter

16 March 2002

Liverpool St Helens	23 - 3	Blaydon
	Report

Moss Lane
Attendance: 250
Referee: A Malpass

16 March 2002

Morley	48 - 12	West Hartlepool
	Report

Scatcherd Lane
Referee: S Makinson

16 March 2002

New Brighton	22 - 22	Dudley Kingswinford
	Report

Hartsfield
Attendance: 450
Referee: Alan Biggs

16 March 2002

Nuneaton	32 - 51	Doncaster
	Report

Liberty Way
Referee: Chris Sharp

16 March 2002

Sandal	19 - 36	Darlington Mowden Park
	Report

Milnthorpe Green

16 March 2002

Scunthorpe	19 - 16	Tynedale
	Report

Heslam Park
Attendance: 300
Referee: Andrew Canning

=== Rounds 15 & 16 (rescheduled games) ===
23 March 2002

Bedford Athletic	23 - 17	Morley
	Report

Putnoe Woods
Attendance: 150
Referee: Nick Cousins

- Game rescheduled from 5 January 2002.

23 March 2002

New Brighton	20 - 19	Nuneaton
	Report

Hartsfield

- Game rescheduled from 5 January 2002.

23 March 2002

Scunthorpe	30 - 16	Liverpool St Helens
	Report

Heslam Park
Referee: Greg Garner

- Game rescheduled from 5 January 2002.

23 March 2002

Tynedale	19 - 13	Dudley Kingswinford
	Report

Tynedale Park
Attendance: 200
Referee: David Helme

- Game rescheduled from 12 January 2002.

23 March 2002

West Hartlepool	6 - 43	Doncaster
	Report

Brinkburn

- Game rescheduled from 5 January 2002.

=== Round 24 ===
30 March 2002

Bedford Athletic	42 - 20	Liverpool St Helens
	Report

Putnoe Woods
Referee: Craig Pocock

30 March 2002

Blaydon	21 - 31	Tynedale
	Report

Crow Trees

30 March 2002

Dudley Kingswinford	34 - 19	Nuneaton
	Report

Heathbrook
Attendance: 550
Referee: Nick Williams

30 March 2002

New Brighton	40 - 19	Morley
	Report

Hartsfield

30 March 2002

Scunthorpe	33 - 72	Doncaster
	Report

Heslam Park
Referee: Graham Hughes

30 March 2002

West Hartlepool	15 - 27	Darlington Mowden Park
	Report

Brinkburn

30 March 2002

Whitchurch	56 - 16	Sandal
	Report

Edgeley Park
Attendance: 275
Referee: Greg Garner

=== Round 25 ===
6 April 2002

Bedford Athletic	28 - 7	New Brighton
	Report

Putnoe Woods
Attendance: 150
Referee: Steve Harland

6 April 2002

Darlington Mowden Park	12 - 17	Scunthorpe
	Report

Yiewsley Drive

6 April 2002

Liverpool St Helens	10 - 12	Dudley Kingswinford
	Report

Moss Lane
Referee: Tim Wigglesworth

6 April 2002

Morley	19 - 19	Whitchurch
	Report

Scatcherd Lane
Referee: Brendan Fitzmaurice

6 April 2002

Nuneaton	15 - 18	Blaydon
	Report

Liberty Way
Referee: Andrew Vertigan

6 April 2002

Sandal	17 - 31	West Hartlepool
	Report

Milnthorpe Green
Referee: Rob Sawyer

6 April 2002

Tynedale	15 - 33	Doncaster
	Report

Tynedale Park
Attendance: 350
Referee: Alan Hughes

=== Round 26 ===
13 April 2002

Blaydon	67 - 0	Sandal
	Report

Crow Trees
Referee: Andrew Gardner

13 April 2002

Doncaster	86 - 3	Darlington Mowden Park
	Report

Castle Park
Referee: Chris Seeley

13 April 2002

Dudley Kingswinford	32 - 30	Morley
	Report

Heathbrook
Attendance: 475
Referee: Alan Biggs

13 April 2002

New Brighton	54 - 8	Liverpool St Helens
	Report

Hartsfield
Referee: Chris Sharp

13 April 2002

Scunthorpe	17 - 30	Bedford Athletic
	Report

Heslam Park
Attendance: 400
Referee: John Dunham

13 April 2002

Whitchurch	23 - 30	Nuneaton
	Report

Edgeley Park
Referee: Mick Reid

13 April 2002

West Hartlepool	9 - 30	Tynedale
	Report

Brinkburn
Referee: Marcelo Pilara

=== Round 18 (rescheduled games) ===
20 April 2002

Nuneaton	28 - 19	Morley
	Report

Liberty Way

- Game rescheduled from 26 January 2002.

20 April 2002

Sandal	7 - 34	Liverpool St Helens
	Report

Milnthorpe Green
Attendance: 150
Referee: S Makinson

- Game rescheduled from 26 January 2002.

=== Round 21 (rescheduled games) ===
27 April 2002

Liverpool St Helens	17 - 33	Doncaster
	Report

Moss Lane

- Game rescheduled from 23 February 2002.

27 April 2002

Nuneaton	13 - 15	Tynedale
	Report

Liberty Way
Attendance: 120
Referee: Mark Rose

- Game rescheduled from 23 February 2002.

=== Promotion play-off ===
The league runners up of National Division Three South and North would meet in a playoff game for promotion to National Division Two. Launceston were runners-up in the south and because they had a better league record than north runners-up, Dudley Kingswinford, they hosted the play-off match.

27 April 2002

Launceston	26 - 0	Dudley Kingswinford
	Report

Polson Bridge
Attendance: 2,500
Referee: Alan Biggs

== Total season attendances ==
Club	Home Games	Total	Average	Highest	Lowest	% Capacity
Bedford Athletic	8 (Note: Missing home attendances v Dudley Kingswinford on 1 September 2001, Doncaster on 20 October 2001, Nuneaton on 17 November 2001, Scunthorpe on 8 December 2001 and Liverpool St Helens on 30 March 2002.)	1,225	153	200	125	31%
Blaydon	4 (Note: Missing home attendances v New Brighton on 6 October 2001, Whitchurch on 27 October 2001, West Hartlepool on 10 November 2001, Morley on 1 December 2001, Scunthorpe on 26 January 2002, Dudley Kingswinford on 9 February 2002, Darlington Mowden Park on 2 March 2002, Tynedale on 30 March 2002 and Sandal on 13 April 2002.)	980	245	300	150	12%
Darlington Mowden Park	2 (Note: Missing home attendances v Bedford Athletic on 27 October 2001, Dudley Kingswinford on 10 November 2001, Blaydon on 24 November 2001, Tynedale on 1 December 2001, Doncaster on 8 December 2001, Whitchurch on 12 January 2002, New Brighton on 26 January 2002, Liverpool St Helens on 9 February 2002, West Hartlepool on 16 February 2002, Nuneaton on 9 March 2002 and Scunthorpe on 6 April 2002.)	700	350	400	300	
Doncaster	2 (Note: Missing home attendances v Nuneaton on 8 September 2001, Liverpool St Helens on 6 October 2001, New Brighton on 27 October 2001, Whitchurch on 10 November 2001, West Hartlepool on 24 November 2001, Sandal on 1 December 2001, Tynedale on 15 December 2001, Blaydon on 12 January 2002, Bedford Athletic on 9 February 2002, Morley on 9 March 2002 and Darlington Mowden Park on 13 April 2002.)	3,000	1,500	2,000	1,000	49%
Dudley Kingswinford	11 (Note: Missing home attendances v Blaydon on 20 October 2001 and Tynedale on 17 November 2001.)	5,520	502	750	300	22%
Liverpool St Helens	4 (Note: Missing home attendances v Whitchurch on 1 September 2001, Darlington Mowden Park on 20 October 2001, Sandal on 3 November 2001, Morley on 17 November 2001, New Brighton on 8 December 2001, Nuneaton on 19 January 2002, Tynedale on 2 February 2002, Dudley Kingswinford on 6 April 2002 and Doncaster on 27 April 2002.)	800	200	250	150	5%
Morley	1 (Note: Missing home attendances v Doncaster on 22 September 2001, Tynedale on 20 October 2001, Scunthorpe on 10 November 2001, Bedford Athletic on 24 November 2001, Dudley Kingswinford on 8 December 2001, Liverpool St Helens on 12 January 2002, Sandal on 2 February 2002, New Brighton on 16 February 2002, Darlington Mowden Park on 23 February 2002, Nuneaton on 2 March 2002, West Hartlepool on 16 March 2002 and Whitchurch on 6 April 2002.)	400	400	400	400	7%
New Brighton	1 (Note: Missing home attendances v Whitchurch on 22 September 2001, West Hartlepool on 20 October 2001, Sandal on 17 November 2001, Scunthorpe on 1 December 2001, Bedford Athletic on 15 December 2001, Darlington Mowden Park on 29 December 2001, Tynedale on 19 January 2002, Doncaster on 2 February 2002, Blaydon on 23 February 2002, Nuneaton on 23 March 2002, Morley on 30 March 2002 and Liverpool St Helens on 13 April 2002.)	450	450	450	450	23%
Nuneaton	2 (Note: Missing home attendances v West Hartlepool on 1 September 2001, Darlington Mowden Park on 22 September 2001, Sandal on 20 October 2001, Scunthorpe on 27 October 2001, Liverpool St Helens on 10 November 2001, Whitchurch on 8 December 2001, Bedford Athletic on 12 January 2002, Dudley Kingswinford on 16 February 2002, Doncaster on 16 March 2002, Blaydon on 6 April 2002 and Morley on 20 April 2002.)	270	135	150	120	4%
Sandal	8 (Note: Missing home attendances v Doncaster on 1 September 2001, Tynedale on 22 September 2001, Bedford Athletic on 10 November 2001, Darlington Mowden Park on 16 March 2002 and West Hartlepool on 6 April 2002.)	1,180	148	200	100	
Scunthorpe	8 (Note: Missing home attendances v New Brighton on 1 September 2001, West Hartlepool on 17 November 2001, Sandal on 23 February 2002, Liverpool St Helens on 23 March 2002 and Doncaster on 30 March 2002.)	2,400	300	450	250	25%
Tynedale	5 (Note: Missing home attendances v New Brighton on 1 September 2001, Scunthorpe on 8 September 2001, Liverpool St Helens on 27 October 2001, New Brighton on 10 November 2001, Whitchurch on 24 November 2001, West Hartlepool on 8 December 2001, Morley on 9 February 2002 and Sandal on 9 March 2002.)	1,300	260	400	150	13%
West Hartlepool	1 (Note: Missing home attendances v Morley on 8 September 2001, Bedford Athletic on 6 October 2001, Dudley Kingswinford on 27 October 2001, Nuneaton on 1 December 2001, Sandal on 15 December 2001, Scunthorpe on 12 January 2002, Whitchurch on 26 January 2002, New Brighton on 9 February 2002, Liverpool St Helens on 2 March 2002, Doncaster on 23 March 2002, Darlington Mowden Park on 30 March 2002 and Tynedale on 13 April 2002.)	150	150	150	150	15%
Whitchurch	5 (Note: Missing home attendances v Darlington Mowden Park on 17 November 2001, Liverpool St Helens on 1 December 2001, Doncaster on 19 January 2002, Blaydon on 2 February 2002, Scunthorpe on 9 February 2002, Tynedale on 2 March 2002, New Brighton on 9 March 2002 and Nuneaton on 13 April 2002.)	1,650	330	375	275	

== Individual statistics ==
- Note that points scorers includes tries as well as conversions, penalties and drop goals.

=== Top points scorers ===
Rank	Player	Team	Appearances	Points
1	(England) John Liley	Doncaster	26	359
2	(England) Steve Smart	Dudley Kingswinford	22	320
3	(England) Paul Brett	New Brighton	26	288
4	(England) Simon Worsley	Liverpool St Helens	22	227
5	(England) Tim Robinson	Scunthorpe	25	198
6	(England) James Lofthouse	Blaydon	22	190
7	(England) Alistair Sherlock	Morley	20	143
8	(England) Shaun Perry	Dudley Kingswinford	24	138
9	(England) Jamie Elphick	Bedford Athletic	22	136
10	(England) Phillip Belgian	Tynedale	13	120
10	(England) Derek Eves	Doncaster	26	120
10	(England) Chris Conway	Doncaster	26	120

=== Top try scorers ===
Rank	Player	Team	Appearances	Tries
1	(England) Shaun Perry	Dudley Kingswinford	24	25
2	(England) Derek Eves	Doncaster	26	24
2	(England) Chris Conway	Doncaster	26	24
3	(England) Sean Casey	Liverpool St Helens	25	22
4	(England) Olly Ryan	Bedford Athletic	20	18
5	(England) Matt Donkin	Doncaster	21	17
5	(England) Steve Smart	Dudley Kingswinford	22	17
5	(Wales) Emrys Evans	New Brighton	22	17
5	(England) Matt Brain	Doncaster	23	17
6	(England) Andrew Foreman	Blaydon	22	15

== Season records ==
=== Team ===
Largest home win — 83 pts

86 - 3 Doncaster at home to Darlington Mowden Park on 13 April 2002

Largest away win — 61 pts

71 - 0 Dudley Kingswinford away to Sandal on 24 November 2001

Most points scored — 95 pts

95 - 13 Doncaster at home to West Hartlepool on 24 November 2001

Most tries in a match — 15

Doncaster at home to West Hartlepool on 24 November 2001

Most conversions in a match — 10

Doncaster at home to West Hartlepool on 24 November 2001

Most penalties in a match — 6 (x2)

Blaydon at home to New Brighton on 6 October 2001
Scunthorpe at home to Blaydon on 3 November 2001

Most drop goals in a match — 1 (x8)

N/A (multiple teams)

=== Player ===
Most points in a match — 35

(England) Matt Donkin for Doncaster at home to Whitchurch on 10 November 2001

Most tries in a match — 7

(England) Matt Donkin for Doncaster at home to Whitchurch on 10 November 2001

Most conversions in a match — 10

(England) John Liley for Doncaster at home to West Hartlepool on 24 November 2001

Most penalties in a match — 6 (x2)

(England) James Lofthouse for Blaydon at home to New Brighton on 6 October 2001
(England) Tim Robinson for Scunthorpe at home to Blaydon on 3 November 2001

Most drop goals in a match — 1 (x22)

N/A (multiple players)

=== Attendances ===
Highest — 2,000

Doncaster at home to Dudley Kingswinford on 26 January 2002

Lowest — 100 (x2)

Sandal at home to Dudley Kingswinford on 24 November 2001 and Whitchurch on 16 February 2002

Highest Average Attendance — 1,500 (Note: Note that as this figure is from 2 home games only (due to poor attendance tracking) it is highly unlikely that Doncaster's final attendance average was this high.)

Doncaster

Lowest Average Attendance — 150

Nuneaton

== See also ==
- English Rugby Union Leagues
- English rugby union system
- Rugby union in England
