= Frank Sykes =

English rugby union player

- Full name: Frank Douglas Sykes
- Born: 9 December 1927 Batley, England
- Died: 12 May 2017 (aged 89)

Rugby union career
- Position: Wing
Senior career
Years	Team	Apps	(Points)
–	Huddersfield		
–	Northampton		
1950-60	Yorkshire	79	
International career
Years	Team	Apps	(Points)
1955-63	England	4	(3)
1955	British Lions		

Frank Douglas Sykes (9 December 1927 – 12 May 2017) born in Batley, was an English rugby union footballer who played in the 1940s, 1950s and 1960s. He played at representative level for British Lions (non-Test matches), England, and Yorkshire, and at club level for Huddersfield, and Northampton, as a Wing.

== Playing career ==
=== International honours ===
Frank Sykes won caps for England in 1955 against France and Scotland, and in 1963 against New Zealand, and Australia.

=== County honours ===
Frank Sykes played seventy-nine matches for Yorkshire, including sixty-six consecutive County Championship matches.
