= Regional 1 North East =

Level five rugby union league in England

- Current season or competition: 2025–26 Regional 1 North East
- Sport: Rugby union
- Instituted: 2022
- Number of teams: 12
- Country: England
- Holders: Heath (2025–26 (promoted to National League North)
- Most titles: Billingham, Harrogate, Scunthorpe, Heath (1 title)
- Website: Northern Division

Regional 1 North East is a level five league in the English rugby union system, with the twelve teams drawn from across North East England and the East Midlands. The other level five leagues are Regional 1 Midlands, Regional 1 North West, Regional 1 South Central, Regional 1 South East and Regional 1 South West.

Heath are the 2025-26 champions and are promoted to National League 2 North.

== Format ==
The twelve teams in this league are drawn from across North East England and the East Midlands, with the league champions promoted to National 2 North. The league's bottom two teams are relegated to either Regional 2 North, Regional 2 North East or Regional 2 North Midlands, depending on their geographic location.

The season runs from September to April and comprises twenty-two rounds of matches, with each club playing each of its rivals home and away. The results of the matches contribute points to the league table as follows:

- 4 points are awarded for a win
- 2 points are awarded for a draw
- 0 points are awarded for a loss, however
- 1 losing (bonus) point is awarded to a team that loses a match by 7 points or fewer
- 1 additional (bonus) point is awarded to a team scoring 4 tries or more in a match

== 2026–27 ==
Seven of last season's teams competed in this season's competition.

Departing were the champions Heath (champions) promoted to National 2 North as were Harrogate (3rd - playoff winners), while Penrith (11th) and Cleckheaton (12th) were relegated to Regional 2 North and Regional 2 NE respectively. Also departing were Kendal (8th) on a level transfer to Regional 1 North West.

Dronfield, promoted from Regional 2 North Midlands as champions, were originally allocated to the league when the provisional lineup was announced before being switched to Regional 1 North West with Sandal taking their place having themselves been initially level transferred from R1NE to Regional 1 North West.

=== Participating teams and locations ===
Team	Ground	Capacity	City/Area	Previous season
Alnwick	Greensfield	1,200 (200 in stand)	Alnwick, Northumberland	Runners-up
Blaydon	Crow Trees	2,000 (400 seats)	Swalwell, Tyne and Wear	5th
Driffield	Show Ground		Driffield, East Riding of Yorkshire	6th
Hull	Ferens Ground	1,500 (288 seats)	Kingston upon Hull, East Riding	Relegated from National League 2 North (14th)
Ilkley	Stacks Field	2,000 (40 seats)	Ilkley, West Yorkshire	4th
Middlesbrough	Acklam Park	5,000 (159 seats)	Acklam, Middlesbrough, North Yorkshire	9th
Northern	McCracken Park	1,000	Gosforth, Newcastle upon Tyne, Tyne and Wear	Promoted from Regional 2 North (champions)
North Ribblesdale	Grove Park		Settle, North Yorkshire	Promoted from Regional 2 North West (champions)
Sandal	Milnthorpe Green		Sandal Magna, Wakefield, West Yorkshire	7th
Scarborough	Silver Royd	4500 (425 seats)	Scalby, Scarborough, North Yorkshire	Promoted from Regional 2 North East (champions)
Scunthorpe	Heslam Park	1,212 (212 seats)	Scunthorpe, Lincolnshire	Relegated from National League 2 North (13th)
York	Clifton Park		York, North Yorkshire	10th

Locations of the 2026–27 Regional 1 North East teams

== 2025–26 ==
Eight of last seasons teams competed in this season's competition. Departing were the champions Scunthorpe, promoted to National 2 North, while Percy Park (11th) and Selby (12th) were relegated to Regional 2 North and Regional 2 NE respectively. Also leaving was Huddersfield (2nd) on a level transfer to Regional 1 North West. The new teams entering the league were Harrogate (12th) relegated from National League North, Middlesbrough (1st) promoted from Regional 2 North and two teams, Penrith (7th) and Kendal (9th), both on a level transfer from Regional 1 North West.

=== Participating teams and locations ===
Team	Ground	Capacity	City/Area	Previous season
Alnwick	Greensfield	1,200 (200 in stand)	Alnwick, Northumberland	5th
Blaydon	Crow Trees	2,000 (400 seats)	Swalwell, Tyne and Wear	10th
Cleckheaton	Moorend		Cleckheaton, West Yorkshire	6th
Driffield	Show Ground		Driffield, East Riding of Yorkshire	8th
Harrogate	Rudding Lane	2,000	Harrogate, North Yorkshire	Relegated from National League 2 North (14th)
Heath	West Vale		West Vale, Halifax, West Yorkshire	3rd
Ilkley	Stacks Field	2,000 (40 seats)	Ilkley, West Yorkshire	7th
Kendal	Mint Bridge Stadium	3,500 (258 seats)	Kendal, Cumbria	Level transfer from Regional 1 North West (9th)
Middlesbrough	Acklam Park	5,000 (159 seats)	Acklam, Middlesbrough, North Yorkshire	Promoted from Regional 2 North (champions)
Penrith	Winters Park		Penrith, Cumbria	Level transfer from Regional 1 North West (7th)
Sandal	Milnthorpe Green		Sandal Magna, Wakefield, West Yorkshire	9th
York	Clifton Park		York, North Yorkshire	4th

Locations of the 2025–26 Regional 1 North East teams

=== Table ===
2025–26 Regional 1 North East table
Pos	Team	Pld	W	D	L	PF	PA	PD	TB	LB	Pts	Qualification
1	Heath (C)	22	21	0	1	983	363	+620	17	1	102	Promotion place
2	Alnwick	22	19	0	3	741	349	+392	14	3	93	Promotion play-off
3	Harrogate (P)	22	16	0	6	794	445	+349	18	3	85	Promotion play-off
4	Ilkley	22	13	0	9	811	616	+195	17	4	73	
5	Blaydon	22	10	1	11	605	558	+47	13	3	58	
6	Driffield	22	10	1	11	582	682	−100	15	1	58	
7	Sandal	22	9	1	12	638	722	−84	11	1	50	
8	Kendal	22	8	1	13	559	532	+27	8	6	48	
9	Middlesbrough	22	8	0	14	583	754	−171	12	2	46	Relegation play-off
10	York	22	8	0	14	455	616	−161	9	3	44	Relegation play-off
11	Penrith (R)	22	6	0	16	495	950	−455	11	4	39	Relegation places
12	Cleckheaton (R)	22	2	0	20	348	1007	−659	2	2	12	Relegation places

Updated to match(es) played on 11 April 2026. Source: England Rugby
Rules for classification: If teams are level at any stage, tiebreakers are applied in the following order:
1. Number of matches won
2. Number of matches drawn
3. Difference between points for and against
4. Total number of points for
5. Aggregate number of points scored in matches between tied teams
6. Number of matches won excluding the first match, then the second and so on until the tie is settled

=== Play-offs ===
Promotion play-offs

25 April 2026

Alnwick	35 – 45	Harrogate

Greensfield, Alnwick

2 May 2026

Anselmians	40 – 41	Harrogate

Malone Field, Eastham, Merseyside

National League 2 North Accession Final

The 12th-placed team in the National League 2 North played the winner of the Regional 1 North East and Regional 1 North West promotion play-off to decide who would be the final side in next seasons National League 2 North.

9 May 2026

Rossendale	14 – 21	Harrogate

Marl Pits, Rawtenstall

- Harrogate promoted.

Relegation play-off

The 9th and 10th placed teams held a play-off, with the losing team playing in the Regional 1 Accession Final, against Pocklington, the winner of the Regional 2 North East promotion play-off. York remain in Regional 1 North East.

25 April 2026

Middlesbrough	20 – 14	York

Acklam Park, Middlesbrough

Regional 1 Accession Final

9 May 2026

York	25 – 21	Pocklington

Clifton Park, York

== 2024–25 ==
Departing were Harrogate, promoted to National 2 North while Doncaster Phoenix (11th) and Pontefract (12th) were relegated to Regional 2 NE.

=== Participating teams and locations ===
Team	Ground	Capacity	City/Area	Previous season
Alnwick	Greensfield	1,200 (200 in stand)	Alnwick, Northumberland	5th
Blaydon	Crow Trees	2,000 (400 seats)	Swalwell, Tyne and Wear	6th
Cleckheaton	Moorend		Cleckheaton, West Yorkshire	10th
Driffield	Show Ground		Driffield, East Riding of Yorkshire	4th
Heath	West Vale		West Vale, Halifax, West Yorkshire	2nd
Huddersfield	Lockwood Park	1,500 (500 seats)	Huddersfield, South Yorkshire	Relegated from National 2 North (14th)
Ilkley	Stacks Field	2,000 (40 seats)	Ilkley, West Yorkshire	9th
Percy Park	Preston Avenue		North Shields, Tyne and Wear	Promoted from Regional 2 North (champions)
Sandal	Milnthorpe Green		Sandal Magna, Wakefield, West Yorkshire	8th
Scunthorpe	Heslam Park	1,212 (212 seats)	Scunthorpe, Lincolnshire	7th
Selby	Sandhill Lane		Selby, North Yorkshire	Promoted from Regional 2 NE (champions)
York	Clifton Park		York, North Yorkshire	3rd

Locations of the 2024–25 Regional 1 North East teams

=== Table ===
Regional 1 North East 2024–25
	Team	Played	Won	Drawn	Lost	Points for	Points against	Points diff	Try bonus	Loss bonus	Points
C	Scunthorpe	22	17	0	5	761	421	340	16	4	88
2	Huddersfield	22	17	0	5	714	515	199	16	2	86
3	Heath	22	16	0	6	656	492	164	13	3	80
4	York	22	16	0	6	600	426	174	11	0	75
5	Alnwick	22	10	1	11	612	584	28	14	4	60
6	Cleckheaton	22	10	1	11	557	714	−157	10	1	53
7	Ilkley	22	9	1	12	563	597	−34	11	3	52
8	Driffield	22	9	1	12	543	607	−64	7	6	51
9	Sandal	22	9	0	13	573	704	−131	12	2	50
10	Blaydon	22	6	0	16	586	616	−30	12	5	41
R	Percy Park	22	6	0	16	481	737	−256	9	5	38
R	Selby	22	5	0	17	515	748	−233	12	5	37
If teams are level at any stage, tiebreakers are applied in the following order: 1. Number of matches won 2. Number of draws 3. Difference between points for and against 4. Total number of points for 5. Aggregate number of points scored in matches between tied teams 6. Number of matches won excluding the first match, then the second and so on until the tie is settled
Green background is the promotion place. Pink background are the relegation places (subject to confirmation by the RFU). Updated: 13 April 2025; Source:

== 2023–24 ==
Nine of last seasons teams compete in this season's competition. Last season's champions, Billingham, are promoted to National League 2 North, while two teams were relegated to Regional 2 North Midlands; Paviors (11th) and West Bridgford (12th). New teams in the league are Blaydon and Harrogate, relegated from National League 2 North, and one team was promoted from Regional 2 North East, Pontefract.

=== Participating teams and locations ===
Team	Ground	Capacity	City/Area	Previous season
Alnwick	Greensfield	1,200 (200 in stand)	Alnwick, Northumberland	4th
Blaydon	Crow Trees	2,000 (400 seats)	Swalwell, Tyne and Wear	Relegated from National League 2 North (13th)
Cleckheaton	Moorend		Cleckheaton, West Yorkshire	7th
Doncaster Phoenix	Castle Park	5,000	Doncaster, South Yorkshire	9th
Driffield	Show Ground		Driffield, East Riding of Yorkshire	3rd
Harrogate	Rudding Lane	2,000	Harrogate, North Yorkshire	Relegated from National League 2 North (14th)
Heath	West Vale		West Vale, Halifax, West Yorkshire	2nd
Ilkley	Stacks Field	2,000 (40 seats)	Ilkley, West Yorkshire	8th
Pontefract	Moor Lane		Pontefract, West Yorkshire	Promoted from Regional 2 North East (1st)
Sandal	Milnthorpe Green		Sandal Magna, Wakefield, West Yorkshire	5th
Scunthorpe	Heslam Park	1,212 (212 seats)	Scunthorpe, Lincolnshire	10th
York	Clifton Park		York, North Yorkshire	6th

Locations of the 2023–24 Regional 1 North East teams

=== Table ===
Regional 1 North East 2023–24
	Team	Played	Won	Drawn	Lost	Points for	Points against	Points diff	Try bonus	Loss bonus	Points
C	Harrogate	22	16	2	4	595	382	213	11	3	82
2	Heath	22	16	1	5	563	393	170	11	3	80
3	York	22	15	1	6	596	385	211	11	3	76
4	Driffield	22	13	0	9	585	441	144	14	3	69
5	Alnwick	22	13	0	9	515	571	−56	7	1	60
6	Blaydon	22	10	1	11	570	570	0	14	2	58
7	Scunthorpe	22	10	0	12	490	493	−3	9	4	53
8	Sandal	22	9	1	12	520	517	+3	9	5	52
9	Ilkley	22	8	0	14	496	537	−41	7	6	45
10	Cleckheaton	22	8	0	14	504	588	−84	6	5	43
R	Doncaster Phoenix	22	6	0	16	392	655	−263	5	3	32
R	Pontefract	22	5	0	17	291	585	−294	1	3	24
If teams are level at any stage, tiebreakers are applied in the following order: 1. Number of matches won 2. Number of draws 3. Difference between points for and against 4. Total number of points for 5. Aggregate number of points scored in matches between tied teams 6. Number of matches won excluding the first match, then the second and so on until the tie is settled
Green background is the promotion place. Pink background are the relegation places. Updated: 6 April 2024; Source:

=== Results ===
Home \ Away	ALN	BLA	CLE	DON	DRI	HAR	HTH	ILK	PON	SAN	SCU	YRK
Alnwick	—	31–20	35–21	38–25	24–13	6–44	24–38	6–27	48–6	40–38	19–17	19–16
Blaydon	24–10	—	33–14	59–12	30–25	34–25	17–26	50–17	29–24	32–10	31–29	17–35
Cleckheaton	10–23	30–26	—	53–16	25–23	30–27	14–15	29–23	25–3	14–33	13–25	10–30
Doncaster Phoenix	16–25	35–22	22–24	—	10–38	5–7	12–29	10–18	14–10	23–15	12–51	31–15
Driffield	29–19	21–5	34–35	33–14	—	10–20	32–15	34–20	45–6	39–11	30–20	10–18
Harrogate	20–15	26–12	22–18	54–26	45–27	—	16–16	13–18	32–20	27–25	34–0	14–14
Heath	28–30	42–24	17–23	37–22	15–0	18–13	—	32–12	9–28	21–20	13–3	34–12
Ilkley	19–20	43–8	30–28	24–35	17–37	7–27	28–48	—	25–3	16–19	32–16	20–21
Pontefract	10–26	21–22	51–29	12–9	8–28	16–38	0–20	17–34	—	25–17	5–15	0–41
Sandal	50–14	34–34	32–27	47–5	31–36	20–22	6–34	25–19	15–3	—	30–22	10–24
Scunthorpe	43–15	22–17	24–10	15–28	12–14	7–37	36–31	34–32	19–23	33–22	—	37–13
York	57–28	38–24	34–22	29–10	41–27	28–22	21–25	25–5	45–0	7–10	32–10	—

Updated to match(es) played on 6 April 2024. Source: Regional 1 North East
Legend: Blue = home team win; Yellow = draw; Red = away team win.
For upcoming matches, an "a" indicates there is an article about the rivalry between the two participants.

== 2022–23 ==
Billingham are the first team to win this league and are promoted to National League 2 North.

=== Participating teams and locations ===
Team	Ground	Capacity	City/Area	Previous season
Alnwick	Greensfield	1,200 (200 in stand)	Alnwick, Northumberland	North Premier (7th)
Billingham	Greenwood Road	1,500 (100 seats)	Billingham, County Durham	North Premier (4th)
Cleckheaton	Moorend		Cleckheaton, West Yorkshire	Promoted from North 1 East
Doncaster Phoenix	Castle Park	5,000	Doncaster, South Yorkshire	Midlands Premier (12th)
Driffield	Show Ground		Driffield, East Riding of Yorkshire	Promoted from North 1 East
Heath	West Vale		West Vale, Halifax, West Yorkshire	Promoted from North 1 East
Ilkley	Stacks Field	2,000 (40 seats)	Ilkley, West Yorkshire	Promoted from North 1 East
Paviors	The Ron Rossin Ground		Nottingham, Nottinghamshire	Midlands Premier (13th)
Sandal	Milnthorpe Green		Sandal Magna, Wakefield, West Yorkshire	North Premier (11th)
Scunthorpe	Heslam Park	1,212 (212 seats)	Scunthorpe, Lincolnshire	Midlands Premier (8th)
West Bridgford	The Memorial Ground		West Bridgford, Nottinghamshire	Promoted from Midlands 1 East
York	Clifton Park		York, North Yorkshire	North Premier (10th)

Locations of the 2022–23 Regional 1 North East teams

=== League table ===
Regional 1 North East 2022–23
	Team	Played	Won	Drawn	Lost	Points for	Points against	Points diff	Try bonus	Loss bonus	Points
1	Billingham (P)	22	19	0	3	812	293	519	16	2	94
2	Heath	22	16	0	6	759	444	315	14	4	82
3	Driffield	22	15	1	6	860	478	382	14	3	79
4	Alnwick	22	16	0	6	629	460	169	10	2	76
5	Sandal	22	13	2	7	645	540	105	15	2	73
6	York	22	12	0	10	614	499	115	11	5	64
7	Cleckheaton	22	10	1	11	516	598	−82	9	2	53
8	Ilkley	22	10	0	12	461	522	−61	8	5	53
9	Doncaster Phoenix	22	8	0	14	481	583	−102	5	4	41
10	Scunthorpe	22	4	0	18	473	771	−298	11	6	33
11	Paviors (R)	22	5	0	17	425	856	−431	8	4	32
12	West Bridgford (R)	22	2	0	20	370	1001	−631	5	3	16
If teams are level at any stage, tiebreakers are applied in the following order: 1. Number of matches won 2. Number of draws 3. Difference between points for and against 4. Total number of points for 5. Aggregate number of points scored in matches between tied teams 6. Number of matches won excluding the first match, then the second and so on until the tie is settled
Green background is the promotion place. Pink background are the relegation places. Updated: 12 April 2023; Source:

=== Results ===
Home \ Away	ALN	BIL	CLE	DON	DRI	HTH	ILK	PAV	SAN	SCU	WBR	YRK
Alnwick	—	23–20	56–31	40–12	29–15	27–22	43–10	42–10	12–13	43–22	38–15	13–10
Billingham	60–10	—	45–18	31–3	20–14	39–27	39–23	60–0	45–7	67–0	57–10	24–14
Cleckheaton	18–31	7–49	—	31–14	25–24	7–42	21–9	36–14	20–20	19–25	45–11	7–15
Doncaster Phoenix	20–27	19–17	18–22	—	7–37	15–18	16–26	20–12	5–27	29–22	43–7	11–18
Driffield	31–19	19–38	27–14	27–15	—	37–3	45–18	106–7	52–31	34–27	100–12	29–27
Heath	40–30	30–3	16–23	59–32	40–30	—	34–7	57–7	16–23	50–16	52–28	30–6
Ilkley	6–13	7–31	36–5	22–23	35–34	14–15	—	46–12	26–22	14–7	22–15	29–19
Paviors	35–32	7–47	40–43	28–19	29–31	19–38	15–21	—	10–38	43–36	34–10	20–21
Sandal	27–15	19–29	41–31	26–34	29–29	5–30	22–17	34–12	—	57–19	35–21	44–39
Scunthorpe	3–23	3–17	22–26	17–27	31–55	31–43	31–29	47–24	26–33	—	28–27	31–45
West Bridgford	12–32	14–45	10–41	19–82	3–60	25–80	19–20	28–26	28–69	30–15	—	21–32
York	28–40	19–29	33–26	50–17	19–24	20–17	50–24	44–19	24–23	36–14	45–5	—

Updated to match(es) played on 25 March 2023. Source: Regional 1 North East
Legend: Blue = home team win; Yellow = draw; Red = away team win.
For upcoming matches, an "a" indicates there is an article about the rivalry between the two participants.

== Regional 1 North East honours ==
Regional 1 North East
Season	No of teams	Champions	Runner–up	Relegated teams	Ref
2022–23	12	Billingham	Heath	Paviors (11th) and West Bridgford (12th)	
2023–24	12	Harrogate	Heath	Doncaster Phoenix (11th) and Pontefract (12th)	
2024–25	12	Scunthorpe	Huddersfield	Percy Park (11th) and Selby (12th)	
2025–26	12	Heath	Alnwick RFC (2nd) (lost in the playoffs) Harrogate RUFC (3rd) (promoted via the playoffs)	Penrith RUFC (11th) and Cleckheaton RUFC (12th)	
Green background is the promotion place.

=== List of league titles ===
Team	Number	Champions	Number	Runner-up	Number	3rd place
Heath	1	2026	2	2023, 2024	1	2025
Harrogate	1	2024			1	2026
Billingham	1	2023				
Scunthorpe	1	2025				
Huddersfield			1	2025		
Alniwck			1	2026		
Driffield					1	2023
York					1	2024
Green background are the promoted teams.
