= Yorkshire Cup (rugby union) =

English Rugby Football Union competition

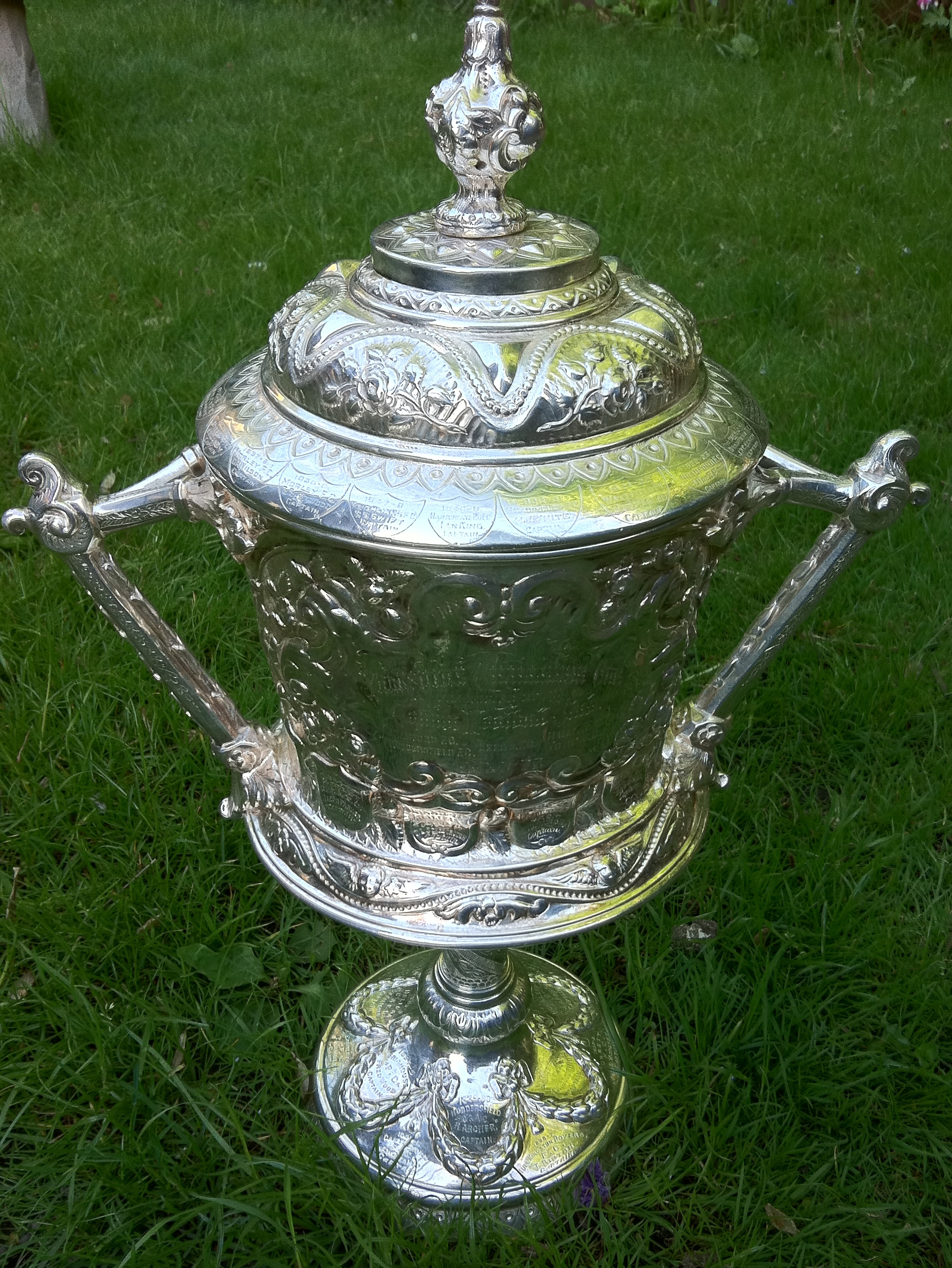
- Sport: Rugby Union
- Instituted: 1877; 149 years ago
- Number of teams: 15
- Country: England
- Holders: York RUFC (1st title) (2024/25)
- Most titles: Halifax RUFC (13 titles)
- Website: Yorkshire RFU

The Yorkshire Cup is an English Rugby Football Union competition founded in 1878. It is organised by the Yorkshire Rugby Football Union and is open to all eligible clubs in the Yorkshire area. It was initially known as the Yorkshire Challenge Cup. Current Champions are York RUFC

The Yorkshire Senior Cup is currently the premier county cup competition for club sides based in Yorkshire that play in tier 4 (National League 2 North), tier 5 (National League 3 North) and tier 6 (North 1 East) of the English rugby union league system. The current format is as a knock-out cup with a first round, second round, quarter-final, semi-final and final, which is to be played at neutral ground in the county. Teams ranked lower than tier 6 play in the Yorkshire Shield or Yorkshire Trophy.

== History ==
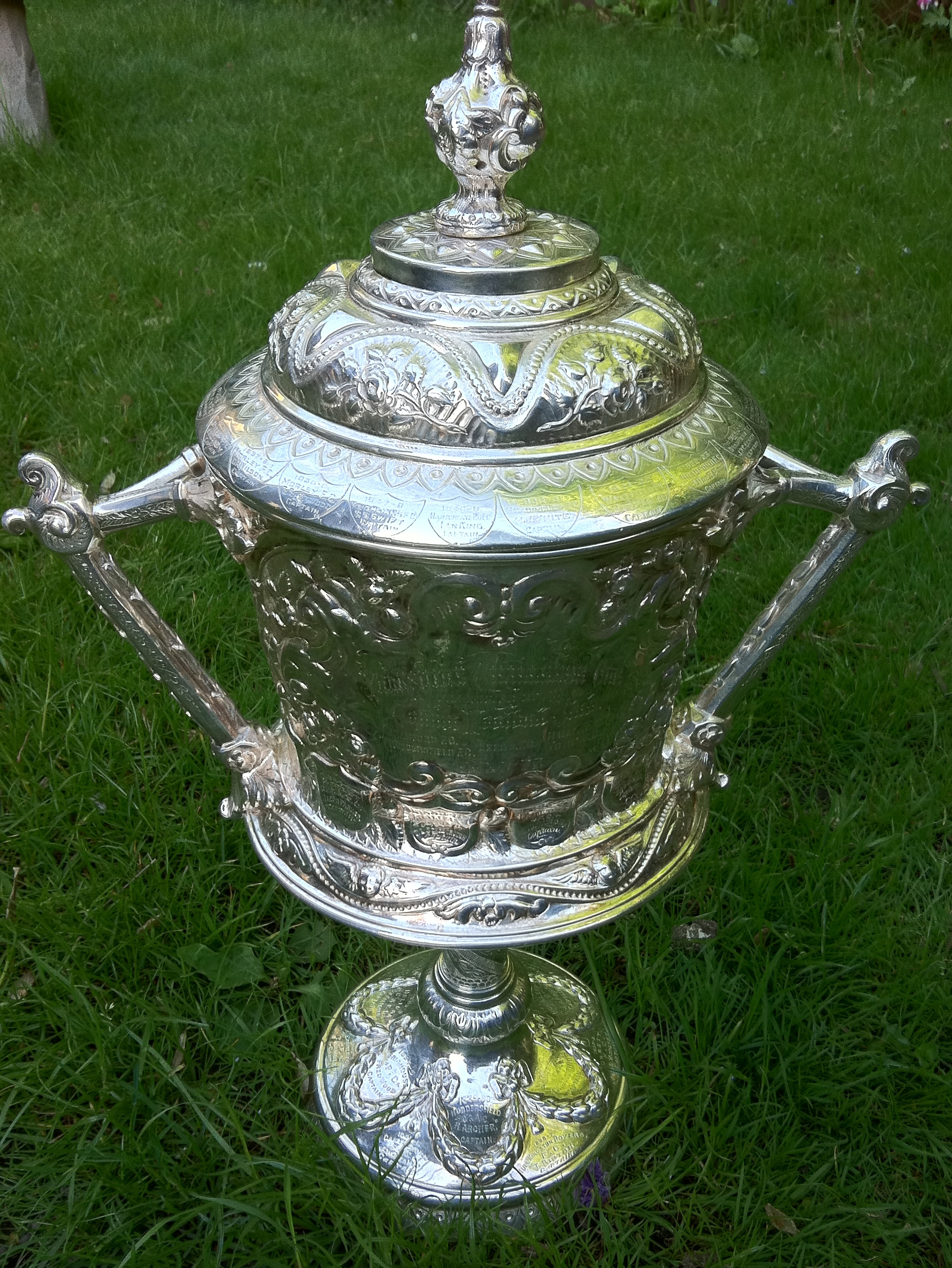
Trophy of Yorkshire Cup

In 1877, despite reservations within the Rugby Football Union, the committee of the Yorkshire County Football Club (composed from the clubs of Bradford FC, Huddersfield FC, Leeds FC, Hull FC and York FC) sanctioned a knock-out tournament - the first of its kind in the UK.

The notion of competing for a trophy appealed to the public of Yorkshire as much as it appalled the guardians of amateurism. The proceeds from the final were distributed among local charities.The trophy itself is known as "T'owd Tin Pot", pronounced with a Yorkshire accent.

In the first season, 16 teams battled it out for the T'owd Tin Pot, with York eventually losing out to Halifax in the final.

In its early years the competition was dominated by clubs who now play rugby league. Since the schism of 1895 which led to the formation of the Northern Rugby Football Union and the development of rugby league football, the cup has been competed for by clubs who remained with the Rugby Football Union or were founded after 1895.

According to the Hallmarks on the trophy it was made by Martin, Hall & Co. Sheffield and London, in 1877. It is made of Sterling Silver .925.

The trophy was won by Morley Rugby Club in the two seasons prior to the Second World War, and was kept "in a drawer under the secretary's bed" for the duration of the war.

== Finals ==
	Year	Winner	Score	Runner up	Venue
1	1878	**Halifax Panthers**	1g, 1t, 9m - 0g, 0t, 0m (Note: Until 1891, the scoring system in place used goals (g), tries (t) and minor points (m) to decide the winners)	York	Recreation Ground, Leeds
2	1879	**Wakefield Trinity**	2g, 1t, 7m - 0g, 0t, 0m	Kirkstall	Thrum Hall, Halifax
3	1880	**Wakefield Trinity** (2)	3g, 6g, 7m - 0g, 1t, 2m	Heckmondwike	Cardigan Fields, Leeds
4	1881	**Dewsbury Rams**	1g, 0t, 0m - 0g, 0t, 4m	Wakefield Trinity	Cardigan Fields, Leeds
5	1882	**Thornes**	1g, 0t, 5m - 0g, 1t, 5m	Wakefield Trinity	Cardigan Fields, Leeds
6	1883	**Wakefield Trinity** (3)	1g, 2t, 11m - 0g, 0t, 0m	Halifax Panthers	Cardigan Fields, Leeds
7	1884	**Bradford**	1g, 4t, 5m - 0g, 1t, 3m	Hull F.C.	Cardigan Fields, Leeds
8	1885	**Batley Bulldogs**	0g, 0t, 6m - 0g, 0t, 2m	Manningham	Cardigan Fields, Leeds
9	1886	**Halifax Panthers** (2)	1g, 0t, 3m - 0g, 0t, 2m	Bradford	Cardigan Fields, Leeds
10	1887	**Wakefield Trinity** (4)	2g, 0t, 2m - 0g, 0t, 2m	Leeds Rhinos	Thrum Hall, Halifax
11	1888	**Halifax Panthers** (3)	0g, 2t, 2m - 0g, 1t, 1m	Wakefield Trinity	Cardigan Fields, Leeds
12	1889	**Otley**	1g, 1t,4m - 1g, 0t, 3m	Liversedge	Cardigan Fields, Leeds
13	1890	**Huddersfield Giants**	1g, 0t, 1m - 0g, 0t, 0m	Wakefield Trinity	Thrum Hall, Halifax
14	1891	**Pontefract**	1g, 1t, 3m - 1g, 0t, 3m	Wakefield Trinity	Headingley, Leeds
15	1892	**Hunslet**	21-0	Leeds Rhinos	Huddersfield
16	1893	**Halifax Panthers** (4)	8-2	Batley Bulldogs	Headingley, Leeds
17	1894	**Halifax Panthers** (5)	38-9	Castleford	Headingley, Leeds
18	1895	**Brighouse Rangers**	16-4	Morley	Headingley, Leeds
19	1896	**Castleford**	3-0	West Riding	Scatcherd Lane, Morley
20	1897	**Hull Kingston Rovers**	11-5	Shipley	West Riding F. C, Leeds
21	1898	**Ossett**	13-3	Hebden Bridge	Wortley, Leeds
22	1899	Alverthorpe	0-0	Sowerby Bridge	Keighley
22	Replay	**Sowerby Bridge**	4-0	Alverthorpe	Keighley
23	1900	**Mytholmroyd**	11-0	Castleford	Claro Road, Harrogate
24	1901	**Castleford** (2)	20-6	Morley	Claro Road, Harrogate
25	1902	**Castleford** (3)	9-5	Old Dewsburians	Claro Road, Harrogate
26	1903	Castleford	6-6 (Note: Skipton contested result on grounds that Castleford had included an ineligible player, therefore a replay was arranged.)	Skipton	Claro Road, Harrogate
26	Replay	**Skipton**	(Note: Castleford refused to play. Skipton were declared the winners.)	Castleford	Wakefield
27	1904	**Skipton** (2)	3-0	Mytholmroyd	Claro Road, Harrogate
28	1905	Harrogate	5-5	Wakefield Balne Lane	Castleford
28	Replay	**Harrogate**	7-5	Wakefield Balne Lane	Castleford
29	1906	**Castleford** (4)	11-0	Wakefield Balne Lane	Clarence Fields, Leeds
30	1907	**Harrogate** (2)	11-6	Headingley	Castleford
31	1908	**Castleford** (5)	29-0	Skipton	Cross Green, Otley
32	1909	**Headingley**	3-0 (Note: Cup awarded to Headingley after Skipton, objecting to one of the referees decisions, walked off the field five minutes before half time.)	Skipton	Ilkley
33	1910	**Otley** (2)	6-0	Hull & East Riding	Claro Road, Harrogate
34	1911	**Otley** (3)	12-0	Hull & East Riding	Ilkley
35	1912	**Skipton** (3)	7-0	Otley	Ilkley
36	1913	**Headingley** (2)	20-5	Harrogate Old Boys	Ilkley
37	1914	**Headingley** (3)	18-5	Harrogate Old Boys	Cross Green, Otley
38	1920	**Wakefield RFC**	9-4	Bradford RFC	Cross Green, Otley
1915-1920: Competitions cancelled due to First World War
39	1921	**Headingley** (4)	13-3	Wakefield RFC	Cross Green, Otley
40	1922	**Wakefield RFC** (2)	3-0	Leeds University	Cross Green, Otley
41	1923	**Bradford RFC**	6-0	Wakefield RFC	Skipton
42	1924	**Bradford RFC** (2)	14-3	Wakefield RFC	Cross Green, Otley
43	1925	**Bradford RFC** (3)	22-9	Otley	Ilkley
44	1926	**Halifax RUFC**	8-0	Otley	Lidget Green, Bradford
45	1927	**Halifax RUFC** (2)	17-0	Otley	Lidget Green, Bradford
46	1928	Halifax RUFC	6-6	Otley	Lidget Green, Bradford
46	Replay	**Halifax RUFC** (3)	11-0 (AET)	Otley	Lidget Green, Bradford
47	1929	**Otley** (4)	9-0	Morley	Lidget Green, Bradford
48	1930	**Halifax RUFC** (4)	17-4	Ilkley	Cross Green, Otley
49	1931	**Otley** (5)	13-6	Halifax RUFC	Lidget Green, Bradford
50	1932	**Morley**	18-0	Huddersfield Old Boys	Lidget Green, Bradford
51	1933	**Halifax RUFC** (5)	22-14	Bradford RFC	Cross Green, Otley
52	1934	**Otley** (6)	19-3	Sandal	Lidget Green, Bradford
53	1935	**Halifax RUFC** (6)	14-0	Harrogate Old Boys	Cross Green, Otley
54	1936	**Otley** (7)	26-0	Harrogate Old Boys	Lidget Green, Bradford
55	1937	**Otley** (8)	16-3	Wakefield RFC	Skipton
56	1938	**Morley** (2)	5-0	Wakefield RFC	Ovenden Park, Halifax
57	1939	**Morley** (3)	10-0	Bradford RFC	Cross Green, Otley
1940-1946: No competition held due to Second World War
-	1947 Competition abandoned due to bad weather				
59	1948	**Keighley**	14-9	Otley	Skipton
60	1949	**Harrogate** (3)	20-6	Skipton	Cross Green, Otley
61	1950	**Halifax RUFC** (7)	11-0	Wakefield RFC	Cross Green, Otley
62	1951	**Halifax RUFC** (8)	9-6	Morley	Cross Green, Otley
63	1952	**Royal Signals**	11-10	Halifax RUFC	Cross Green, Otley
64	1953	**Morley** (4)	8-3	Goole Grammar School Old Boys	Clarence Fields, Leeds
65	1954	**Royal Signals** (2)	17-3	Roundhay	Cross Green, Otley
66	1955	**Morley** (5)	16-9	Bramley Old Boys	Cross Green, Otley
67	1956	Goole Grammar School Old Boys	3-3	Old Pomfretians	Lidget Green, Bradford
67	Replay	**Goole Grammar School Old Boys**	6-0	Old Pomfretians	Selby
68	1957	**West Leeds Old Boys**	13-3	Old Roundhegians	Clarence Fields, Leeds
69	1958	**Old Roundhegians**	11-0	Sandal	Lidget Green, Bradford
70	1959	**Old Hymerians**	15-11	West Leeds Old Boys	Scatcherd Lane, Morley
71	1960	**Old Crossleyans**	9-0	Sandal	Scatcherd Lane, Morley
72	1961	**Old Thornensians**	6-3	West Leeds Old Boys	Scatcherd Lane, Morley
73	1962	Old Thornensians	3-3	York Railway Institute	Scatcherd Lane, Morley
73	Replay	Old Thornensians	0-0	York Railway Institute	Cross Green, Otley
73	2nd Replay	**Old Thornensians** (2)	12-6	York Railway Institute	Cross Green, Otley
-	1963 Competition abandoned due bad weather				
75	1964	**Halifax RUFC** (9)	8-6	Otley	Lidget Green, Bradford
76	1965	**Harrogate** (4)	9-8	Wakefield RFC	Cross Green, Otley
77	1966	**Bradford RFC** (4)	8-3	Harrogate	Cross Green, Otley
78	1967	Halifax RUFC	0-0	Roundhay	Cross Green, Otley
78	Replay	**Halifax RUFC** (10)	11-9	Roundhay	Cross Green, Otley
79	1968	Bradford RFC	3-3	Halifax RUFC	Cross Green, Otley
79	Replay	**Bradford RFC** (5)	8-6	Halifax RUFC	Cross Green, Otley
80	1969	**Wakefield RFC** (3)	15-12 (AET)	Roundhay	Cross Green, Otley
81	1970	**Bradford RFC** (6)	19-6	Huddersfield RUFC	Scatcherd Lane, Morley
82	1971	**Halifax RUFC** (11)	9-3	Old Thornensians	Cross Green, Otley
83	1972	**Morley** (6)	16-3	Bradford RFC	Cross Green, Otley
84	1973	**Morley** (7)	10-9	Roundhay	Clarence Fields, Leeds
85	1974	**Morley** (8)	27-16	Roundhay	Clarence Fields, Leeds
86	1975	Headingley	13-13	Roundhay	Cross Green, Otley
86	Replay	**Roundhay**	20-16	Headingley	Cross Green, Otley
87	1976	**Middlesbrough**	10-9 (AET)	Roundhay	Cross Green, Otley
88	1977	**Morley** (9)	23-9	Halifax RUFC	Clarence Fields, Leeds
89	1978	**Wakefield RFC** (4)	18-9	Middlesbrough	Cross Green, Otley
90	1979	**Morley** (10)	9-9	Harrogate	Clarence Fields, Leeds
91	1980	**Roundhay**	15-6	Morley	Clarence Fields, Leeds
92	1981	**Harrogate** (5)	12-3	Morley	Cross Green, Otley
93	1982	**Wakefield RFC** (5)	23-3	Sheffield	Clarence Fields, Leeds
94	1983	**Headingley** (5)	8-3	Morley	Cross Green, Otley
95	1984	**Headingley** (6)	17-3	Wakefield RFC	Cross Green, Otley
96	1985	**Headingley** (7)	7-0	Wakefield RFC	Cross Green, Otley
97	1986	**Wakefield RFC** (6)	18-6	Morley	Clarence Fields, Leeds
98	1987	**Headingley** (8)	18-4	Morley	
99	1988	**Headingley** (9)	21-9	Wakefield RFC	Scatcherd Lane, Morley
100	1989	**Headingley** (10)	48-9	Otley	Scatcherd Lane, Morley
101	1990	**Wakefield RFC** (7)	16-3	Sheffield	Clarence Fields, Leeds
102	1991	**Harrogate** (6)	23-4	Otley	Scatcherd Lane, Morley
103	1992	**Harrogate** (7)	12-7	Bradford & Bingley	
104	1993	**Otley** (9)	22-5	Rotherham	Clarence Fields, Leeds
105	1994	**Wakefield RFC** (8)	35-9	Sandal	Scatcherd Lane, Morley
106	1995	**Rotherham**	39-3	Harrogate	Clarence Fields, Leeds
107	1996	**Morley** (11)	16-10	Rotherham	
108	1997	**Sandal** (2)	17-13	Doncaster	Cross Green, Otley
109	1998	**Leeds Tykes**	21-11	Doncaster	Scatcherd Lane, Morley
110	1999	**Doncaster**	13-10	Sandal	Brantingham Park, Hull
111	2000	**Doncaster** (2)	29-26	Morley	Lockwood Park, Huddersfield
112	2001	**Sandal**	26-24	Middlesbrough	Claro Road, Harrogate
113	2002	**Harrogate** (8)	24-19	Wharfedale	Cross Green, Otley
114	2003	**Harrogate** (9)	13-12	Doncaster	Scatcherd Lane, Morley
115	2004	**Halifax RUFC** (12)	23-21	Otley	Claro Road, Harrogate
116	2005	**Halifax RUFC** (13)	19-14	Cleckheaton	Wagon Lane, Bingley
117	2006	**Leeds Tykes** (2)	22-11	Wharfedale	Wagon Lane, Bingley
118	2007	**Doncaster** (3)	31-6	Wharfedale	York
119	2008	**Doncaster** (4)	24-17	Wharfedale	Claro Road, Harrogate
120	2009	**Leeds Tykes U19**(3)	23-13	Beverley	Brantingham Park, Hull
121	2010	**Wharfedale**	36-13	Sheffield Tigers	Huddersfield YMCA, Huddersfield
122	2011	**Huddersfield RUFC**	25-18	Hull RUFC	York
123	2012	**Hull RUFC**	20-10	Wharfedale	York
-	2013 Competition abandoned due to bad weather				
125	2014	**Wharfedale** (2)	34-29	Otley	Wagon Lane, Bingley
126	2015	**Harrogate** (10)	16-12	Wharfedale	The Sycamores, Leeds
127	2016	**Harrogate** (11)	38-3	Sheffield Tigers	Moor Lane, Pontefract
128	2017	**Harrogate** (12)	(Note: Harrogate won by walkover as Sheffield Tigers could not agree a date to play the final citing player welware. Final had originally been scheduled for 26 April 2017 at Scatcherd Lane in Morley but was ultimately cancelled.)	Sheffield Tigers	Scatcherd Lane
129	2018	**Hull RUFC** (2)	34-7	Doncaster Phoenix	Clifton Park, York
130	2019	**Sandal** (3)	33-14	Sheffield	Scatcherd Lane, Morley
2020-2021: Competitions cancelled due to COVID-19 Pandemic
131	2023	**Middlesbrough**	30-24	Sandal	Castle Park

=== Results ===
- § Denotes club now defunct
- ± Denotes club plays rugby league following the schism
- Teams in **bold** are active clubs currently competing in rugby union competitions.

	Club	Wins	Runners up	Winning years
1	**Halifax RUFC**	13	4	1926, 1927, 1928, 1930, 1933, 1935, 1951, 1951, 1964, 1967, 1971, 2004, 2005
2	**Harrogate**	12	2	1905, 1907, 1949, 1965, 1981, 1991, 1992, 2002, 2003, 2015, 2016, 2017
3	**Morley**	11	9	1932, 1938, 1939, 1953, 1955, 1972, 1973, 1974, 1977, 1979, 1996
4	Headingley§	10	3	1909, 1913, 1914, 1921, 1983, 1984, 1985, 1987, 1988, 1989
5	**Otley**	9	11	1889, 1910, 1911, 1929, 1931, 1934, 1936, 1937, 1993
6	Wakefield RFC§	7	10	1920, 1922, 1969, 1978, 1982, 1986, 1990, 1994
7	**Bradford & Bingley**	6	4	1923, 1924, 1925, 1966, 1968, 1970
8	Castleford§	5	4	1896, 1901, 1902, 1906, 1908
9	Halifax Panthers±	5	1	1878, 1886, 1888, 1893, 1894
10	Wakefield Trinity±	4	5	1879, 1880, 1883, 1887
11	**Doncaster**	4	3	1999, 2000, 2007, 2008
12	**Skipton**	3	3	1903, 1904, 1912
13	**Sandal**	3	2	1997, 2001, 2019
14	**Leeds Tykes**	3	0	1998, 2006, 2009
15	**Wharfedale**	2	6	2010, 2014
16	Roundhay§	2	5	1975, 1980
17	**Old Thornisions**	2	1	1961, 1962
18	**Hull RUFC**	2	1	2012, 2018
19	Royal Signals	2	0	1952, 1954
1	West Leeds Old Boys§	1	2	1957
1	**Middlesbrough**	1	2	1976, 2023
1	Bradford±§	1	1	1884
1	Batley Bulldogs±	1	1	1885
	**Mytholmroyd**	1	1	1900
1	**Goole Grammar School Old Boys**	1	1	1956
1	Old Roundheigians	1	1	1958
1	**Rotherham**	1	1	1995
1	**Huddersfield RUFC**	1	1	2011
1	Dewsbury Rams±	1	0	1881
1	Thornes§	1	0	1882
1	Huddersfield Giants±	1	0	1890
1	**Pontefract**	1	0	1891
1	Hunslet±§	1	0	1892
1	Brighouse Rangers±§	1	0	1895
1	Hull Kingston Rovers±	1	0	1897
1	**Ossett**	1	0	1898
1	**Sowerby Bridge**	1	0	1899
1	**Keighley**	1	0	1948
1	Old Hymerians	1	0	1959
1	Old Crossleyions	1	0	1960
1	**West Park Leeds**	1	0	2022
1	**Sheffield Tigers**	0	4	
1	**Hull & East Riding**	0	2	
1	Wakefield Balne Lane	0	2	
1	Old Pomfretians	0	2	
1	Alverthorpe	0	1	
1	**Beverley**	0	1	
1	Bramley Old Boys	0	1	
1	**Cleckheaton**	0	1	
1	**Doncaster Phoenix**	0	1	
1	Heckmondwike±	0	1	
1	Hebden Bridge	0	1	
1	Hull F.C.±	0	1	
1	**Ilkley**	0	1	
1	Kirkstall	0	1	
1	Liversedge±	0	1	
1	Manningham±	0	1	
1	Old Dewsburians	0	1	
1	**Sheffield**	0	1	
1	Shipley	0	1	
1	West Riding	0	1	
1	**York Railway Institute**	0	1	
1	**York RUFC**	0	1	
1	York±§	0	1	

== See also ==
- Yorkshire RFU
- Rugby league county cups

== Bibliography ==
- Cup final programmes, including the 1978 Centenary Programme.
- Wakefield Rugby Football Club—1901-2001 A Centenary History. Written and compiled by David Ingall in 2001.
- Yorkshire Rugby Union Centenary 1869-1969 book produced by Yorkshire RFU.
