= Heath RUFC =

English rugby union club

Heath
- Full name: Heath Rugby Football Club
- Union: Yorkshire RFU
- Founded: 1928; 98 years ago
- Location: Halifax, West Yorkshire, England
- Ground: West Vale
- League: Regional 1 North East
- 2025–26: Champions (promoted to National League 2 North)

Official website
- www.heath-rugby.co.uk

Heath Rugby Club is an English rugby union club based in Greetland, near Halifax, West Yorkshire. The first XV team plays in National 2 North, having been promoted into tier five following the league restructuring at the end of the 2021–22 season. This was the club's second promotion in three seasons, after finishing runner-up in two consecutive seasons in Yorkshire 1, obtaining promotion as the best ranked runner-up. The club has made its way up the leagues having started league life in Yorkshire 3.

Following a decision in 2026 to introduce 2XVs into the league structure, Heath's 2nd XV entered Counties 2 Yorkshire B division.

== Current standings ==
2026–27 National League 2 North table
Pos	Team	Pld	W	D	L	PF	PA	PD	TB	LB	Pts	Qualification
1	Sedgley Park	8	8	0	0	420	111	+309	8	0	40	Promotion place
2	Darlington Mowden Park	8	6	0	2	388	159	+229	7	1	32	Promotion play-off
3	Chester	8	6	0	2	315	214	+101	6	1	31	
4	Tynedale	8	6	0	2	252	221	+31	6	0	30	
5	Hull Ionians	7	5	0	2	276	220	+56	7	1	28	
6	Preston Grasshoppers	8	5	0	3	295	235	+60	6	1	27	
7	Harrogate	8	3	1	4	204	328	−124	6	0	20	
8	Sheffield Tigers	8	3	0	5	225	229	−4	5	3	20	
9	Fylde	8	3	0	5	198	253	−55	5	0	17	
10	Billingham	8	3	0	5	222	350	−128	5	0	17	
11	Huddersfield	8	2	1	5	202	362	−160	5	1	16	
12	Heath	8	2	0	6	188	282	−94	4	1	13	Relegation play-off
13	Otley	7	1	0	6	183	292	−109	4	1	9	Relegation place
14	Wharfedale	8	1	0	7	203	315	−112	5	0	9	Relegation place

Updated to match(es) played on 2 September 2026. Source: National League Rugby
Rules for classification: If teams are level at any stage, tiebreakers are applied in the following order:
1. Number of matches won
2. Number of matches drawn
3. Difference between points for and against
4. Total number of points for
5. Aggregate number of points scored in matches between tied teams
6. Number of matches won excluding the first match, then the second and so on until the tie is settled

== Honours ==
- Yorkshire 4 champions: 1997–98
- Powergen Junior Vase winners: 2001–02
- Yorkshire 3 champions (2): 2001–02, 2005–06
- Papa John's Community Cup Regional 1 Championship winners: 2023–24
- Papa John's Community Cup Regional 1 Plate winners: 2024–25
