= Sedgley Park R.U.F.C. =

English rugby union club, based in Greater Manchester

(England) Sedgley Tigers
- Union: Lancashire RFU
- Nickname: The Tigers
- Founded: 1932; 94 years ago
- Location: Whitefield, Greater Manchester, England
- Ground: Park Lane (Capacity: 3,000)
- Chairman: Steve Ward
- League: National League 1
- 2025–26: 13th (relegated to 2026–27 National League 2 North)
Team kit

Official website
- sedgley-tigers.com

Sedgley Park Rugby Union Football Club, the 1st XV team of which play under the name of Sedgley Tigers, is a rugby union club based in Whitefield, in the Metropolitan Borough of Bury, Greater Manchester. They play in the fourth tier of the English rugby union league hierarchy following their relegation from National League 1 to National League 2 North in 2025–26. The Tigers nickname is due to their striped kit.

== History ==
Sedgley Park is a district of Prestwich approximately two miles north of Manchester city centre. In 1932 at a public meeting in a temperance bar, the club began. The very first ground was a farmer's field in Whitefield, and the club has never been based in Sedgley Park. Despite primitive conditions - a cowshed for changing, farmyard pump for washing - the new club thrived.

A clubhouse had already been built and three regular teams were being fielded before World War II broke out in 1939. They survived the war years, and also a difficult period afterward when they lost their rented ground. For two years all games were played away, with barely enough playing members for two teams, until in 1955 they moved to their present site, Park Lane in Whitefield, with an immediate and spectacular improvement in playing standards. During the next twenty years Sedgley Park became a successful and respected junior club but, in the years before professional rugby, advancement was practically impossible, especially for a club notorious for its muddy pitches; they were often nicknamed 'Sludgley Park' by opposing teams. The decision to build a large, two-story clubhouse was arguably the most significant one in their history.

Building began in 1978 at a time when the club was enjoying great success on the field, and was completed in time for the 1982 Golden Jubilee season; it had been a risky venture at the time, but it set them apart from all the local junior clubs. When the Courage Leagues began in 1987 they had progressed far enough to be placed in North West 2 (level 8), from which they gained promotion at the first attempt. They remained in North West 1 for seven years; meanwhile, the club was expanding in other directions with a huge increase in quantity and quality at the age-group level of the game.

When the game went 'open' in the middle 1990s, Sedgley Park was ready for the next leap forward. Promotion was achieved three years in succession; the clubhouse was extended; the two pitches became one, now in excellent condition, with floodlights and terracing. A newly purchased field, just across the road, provided three more much needed pitches and floodlit training.

Another promotion, in 2001, took them to National League Two, level 3 of the English game. The Tigers attained League One status in 2004, their 6th promotion since 1987, but were relegated back to level three in 2009. Sedgley Park were National League Division 2 (North) champions in season 2022–23 and won promotion back to National League One, being the 3rd tier of Rugby Union in England at the time.

== Honours ==
- North West 2 champions: 1987–88
- North West 1 champions: 1994–95
- North 1 champions: 1996–97
- National League 2 (north v south) promotion play-off winner: 2000–01
- Lancashire Cup winners (4 times): 2002, 2004, 2007, 2013
- National Division 2 champions: 2003–04
- National League 2 North champions: 2022–23

== Current standings ==
2026–27 National League 2 North table
Pos	Team	Pld	W	D	L	PF	PA	PD	TB	LB	Pts	Qualification
1	Sedgley Park	8	8	0	0	420	111	+309	8	0	40	Promotion place
2	Darlington Mowden Park	8	6	0	2	388	159	+229	7	1	32	Promotion play-off
3	Chester	8	6	0	2	315	214	+101	6	1	31	
4	Tynedale	8	6	0	2	252	221	+31	6	0	30	
5	Hull Ionians	7	5	0	2	276	220	+56	7	1	28	
6	Preston Grasshoppers	8	5	0	3	295	235	+60	6	1	27	
7	Harrogate	8	3	1	4	204	328	−124	6	0	20	
8	Sheffield Tigers	8	3	0	5	225	229	−4	5	3	20	
9	Fylde	8	3	0	5	198	253	−55	5	0	17	
10	Billingham	8	3	0	5	222	350	−128	5	0	17	
11	Huddersfield	8	2	1	5	202	362	−160	5	1	16	
12	Heath	8	2	0	6	188	282	−94	4	1	13	Relegation play-off
13	Otley	7	1	0	6	183	292	−109	4	1	9	Relegation place
14	Wharfedale	8	1	0	7	203	315	−112	5	0	9	Relegation place

Updated to match(es) played on 2 September 2026. Source: National League Rugby
Rules for classification: If teams are level at any stage, tiebreakers are applied in the following order:
1. Number of matches won
2. Number of matches drawn
3. Difference between points for and against
4. Total number of points for
5. Aggregate number of points scored in matches between tied teams
6. Number of matches won excluding the first match, then the second and so on until the tie is settled

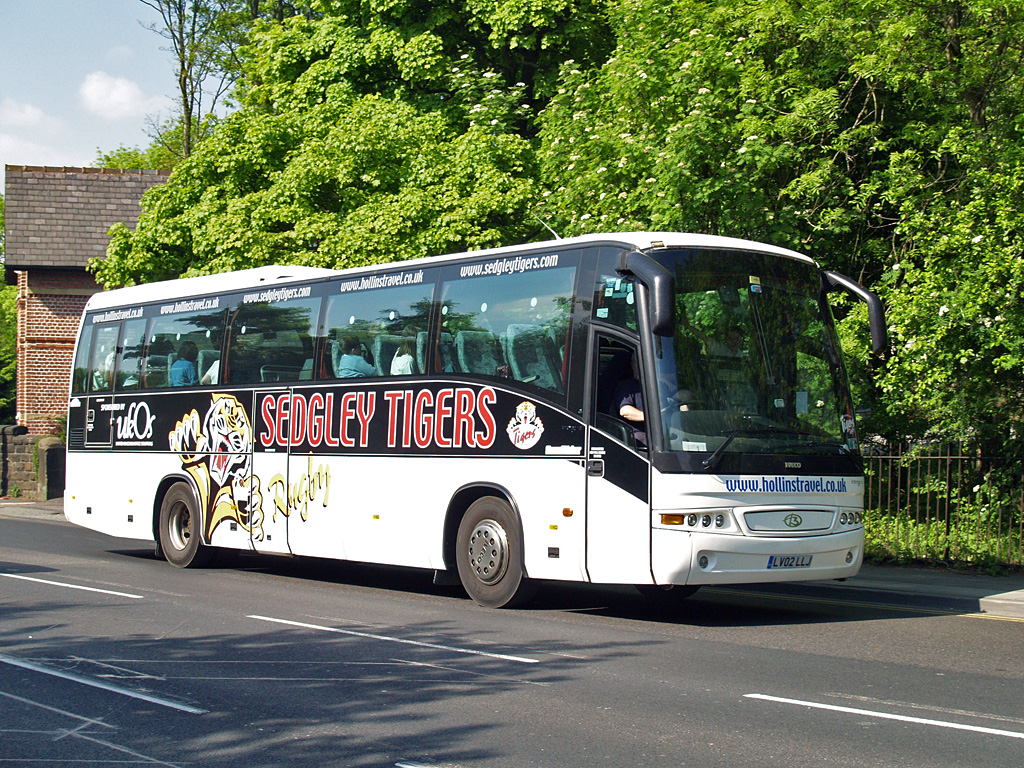
Team bus, pictured on 15 May 2008
