= Sandal RUFC =

English rugby union club

Sandal
- Full name: Sandal Rugby Union Football Club
- Union: Yorkshire RFU
- Founded: 1927; 99 years ago
- Location: Sandal Magna, Wakefield, West Yorkshire, England
- Ground: Milnthorpe Green
- Chairman: Timothy Scatchard
- President: Peter Tunningley
- Coach: Joe Bedford
- League: Regional 1 North East
- 2024–25: 9th
Team kit

Official website
- www.sandalrufc.co.uk

Sandal Rugby Union Football Club is an English rugby union team based in Sandal Magna near Wakefield, West Yorkshire. The club runs three senior sides, a veterans team, academy and colts teams and ten junior teams. The first XV plays in the Regional 1 North East and following a decision in 2026 to introduce 2XVs into the league structure, Sandal's 2nd XV entered Counties 2 Yorkshire B division.

== History ==
Sandal RUFC was formed in 1927 by former Wakefield RFC player Claude Beaumont.

== Honours ==
- North Division 1 champions: 1994–95
- Yorkshire Cup winners (3): 1997, 2001, 2019
- Yorkshire 1 champions: 2007–08
- North 1 (east v west) promotion play-off winners: 2009–10
- National League 3 (north v midlands) promotion play-off winners: 2014–15

== Notable former players ==
- Mike Harrison (rugby union)
- Eric Batten
- Charles Chester
- Jimmy Ledgard
- Donald Metcalfe
- Roger Pearman
- Andy Forsyth
