= Principle Group =

Brand implementation company

Principle
- Industry: Brand implementation
- Founded: 1987
- Headquarters: Huddersfield, UK
- Number of locations: 13 Main Offices; 12 Countries
- Services: Brand Implementation, Signage, Graphics, Architecture, Design, Interior Furniture
- Website: www.principleglobal.com

Principle Group is an international brand implementation company headquartered in Huddersfield, UK, with offices in the USA, Mexico, Germany, France, Italy, Brazil, China, Japan, Russia, South Africa, Australia and India.

== History ==
Principle Group was established in 1987 in a rented office in a former textile mill in Scissett, Huddersfield. Founder Richard Butterfield remains the sole shareholder of the UK registered company.

Initially, the company offered a management service for the implementation of signage change to commercial buildings. Principle expanded its service offerings and the company was transformed from signage middleman into a global implementer of brand and corporate identity, Its expansion has seen it open further UK offices in Northamptonshire, Leicestershire and London, along with international operations in Milan, Munich, Paris, Rio de Janeiro, Shanghai, Mumbai, Cape Town, Moscow, Tokyo, Mexico City and Brisbane. In February 2009, it launched a North American operating division based in Knoxville, Tennessee. Principle has also established an international affiliate network to work on major projects.

In July 2014, Principle Group announced details of a £3 million plan to expand its presence in Huddersfield by redeveloping an industrial site adjacent to its head office. In May 2015, Simon Blagden MBE, the non-executive Chairman of Fujitsu Telecommunications Europe, joined Principle's board as a non-executive director. In 2016 Principle Group FD Victoria Woodings was promoted to the position of CEO.

Principle Group now supplies services to more than 60 countries and its clients include Chrysler, Accenture, TE Connectivity, Barclays, HSBC, Nissan, Royal Bank of Scotland Group, ArcelorMittal, BMW, Xerox, and Towers Watson.

In 2015, Principle became a sponsor of Clerkenwell Design Week.

== Innovation ==
In 2011, Principle Group designed and manufactured the world's first solar-powered signage for green car manufacturer Fisker Automotive. The first installation took place at Century Automotive's showroom in Huntsville, Alabama.

Principle Link, the facilities maintenance division of Principle Group, has developed two products designed to improve communication with hearing aid users.
