= Harrogate RUFC =

English rugby union club, based in North Yorkshire

Harrogate
- Full name: Harrogate Rugby Union Football Club
- Union: Yorkshire RFU
- Nickname: Aces
- Founded: 1871; 155 years ago
- Location: Harrogate, North Yorkshire
- Region: North Yorkshire
- Ground: Rudding Lane (Capacity: 2,000)
- Chairman: Mark Garrett
- President: Jo Finnegan
- Coach(es): Jake Brady (Director of Rugby), Pete Taylor (coach), Olly Toomey (coach)
- Captain: Sam Brady
- League: Regional 1 North East
- 2025–26: 3rd (promoted to National League 2 North)
Team kit

Official website
- www.harrogaterugby.com

Harrogate Rugby Union Football Club is an English rugby union club based in Harrogate, North Yorkshire. The club runs three senior sides. The first team play in National 2 North, following promotion in 25–26. The second team, Harrogate Georgians, play in the Yorkshire 2.

The club also fields a womens team (Harrogate Ladies) in the RFUW Championship, and eight junior teams (from ages 6 to 16).

== History ==
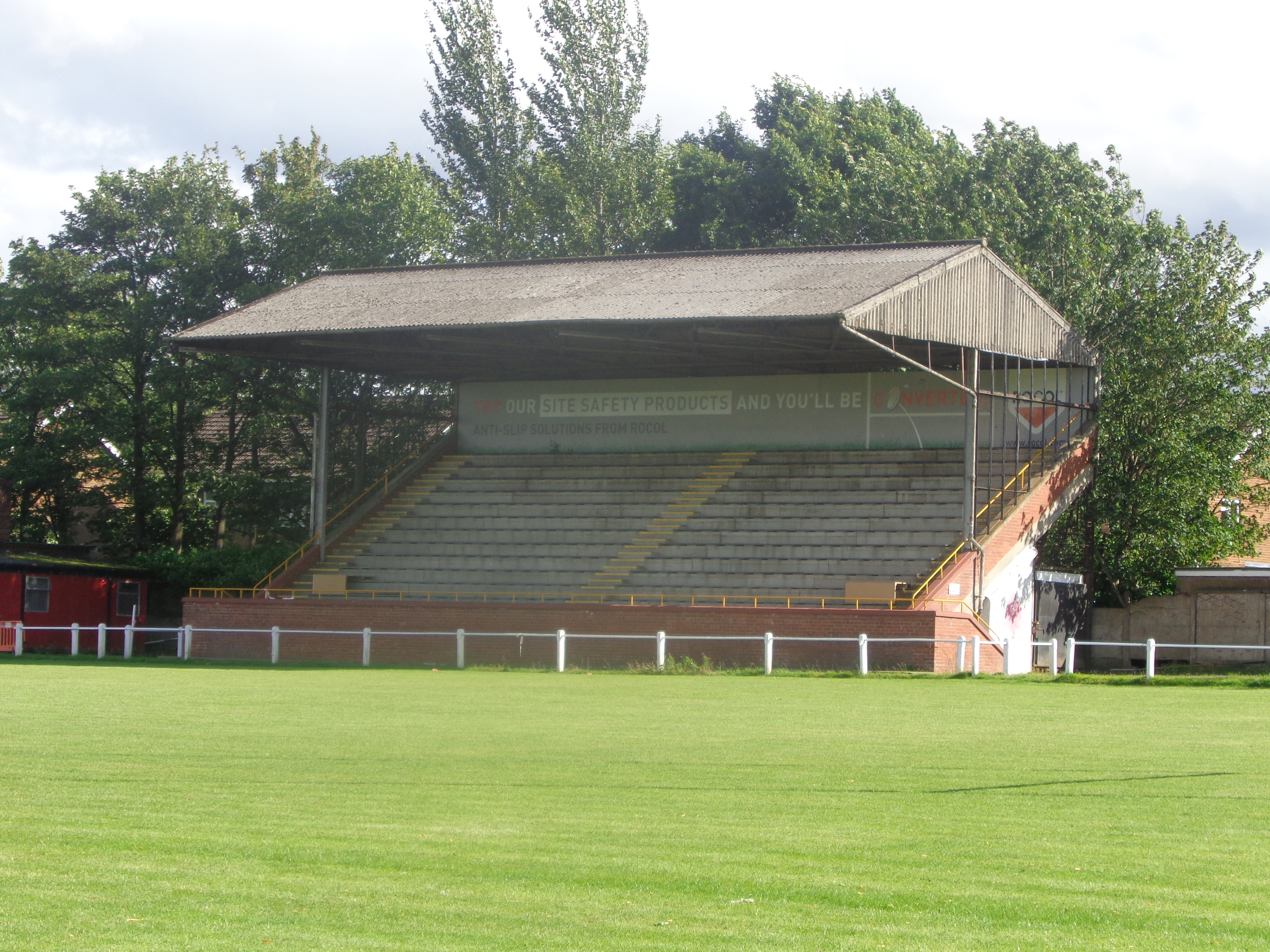
Harrogate RUFC's former Claro Road ground which they left in 2014.

The team was founded in 1871 as Harrogate Football Club, the same year as the Rugby Football Union, and played its first match on 16 December that year. It moved to Dragon Fields in 1875 and then moved to Claro Road in 1896. In 1903, the club played Canada and two years later won the Yorkshire Cup for the first time. In 1914, the club decided to concentrate on football and rugby union activities were split off into a new club called Harrogate Old Boys. In 1923, a club called Harrogate RUFC was formed and RUFC and Old Boys amalgamated in 1936, although it was only in 1945 that the merged club officially became known as Harrogate RUFC. In 1957, the club merged with Harrogate Georgians and the decision was taken to retain the Georgians' name by naming the second XV Harrogate Georgians. When the leagues were formed in 1987, the club was placed in North 1. Subsequent promotions resulted in Harrogate joining the third tier for the 1994–95 season and it remained at that level for thirteen seasons. However, the club has been relegated twice and is playing in regional rugby for the first time in more than twenty years.

Harrogate's most successful season was 2001–02 when it finished fourth in the league, won the Yorkshire Cup and won the National 7s competition. In 2015, the club won the Yorkshire Cup for the tenth time. At the start of the 2015–16 season, after a wait of fifteen years, Harrogate moved from its old ground of Claro Road (where it had been for 119 years) to a new location at Rudding Lane. On 15 September 2015 Harrogate played its first game at Rudding Lane – beating local rivals Otley 15 – 10 in front of a club record crowd of 1,050 in the 2015–16 National League 2 North.

== Current season ==
2026–27 National League 2 North table
Pos	Team	Pld	W	D	L	PF	PA	PD	TB	LB	Pts	Qualification
1	Sedgley Park	8	8	0	0	420	111	+309	8	0	40	Promotion place
2	Darlington Mowden Park	8	6	0	2	388	159	+229	7	1	32	Promotion play-off
3	Chester	8	6	0	2	315	214	+101	6	1	31	
4	Tynedale	8	6	0	2	252	221	+31	6	0	30	
5	Hull Ionians	7	5	0	2	276	220	+56	7	1	28	
6	Preston Grasshoppers	8	5	0	3	295	235	+60	6	1	27	
7	Harrogate	8	3	1	4	204	328	−124	6	0	20	
8	Sheffield Tigers	8	3	0	5	225	229	−4	5	3	20	
9	Fylde	8	3	0	5	198	253	−55	5	0	17	
10	Billingham	8	3	0	5	222	350	−128	5	0	17	
11	Huddersfield	8	2	1	5	202	362	−160	5	1	16	
12	Heath	8	2	0	6	188	282	−94	4	1	13	Relegation play-off
13	Otley	7	1	0	6	183	292	−109	4	1	9	Relegation place
14	Wharfedale	8	1	0	7	203	315	−112	5	0	9	Relegation place

Updated to match(es) played on 2 September 2026. Source: National League Rugby
Rules for classification: If teams are level at any stage, tiebreakers are applied in the following order:
1. Number of matches won
2. Number of matches drawn
3. Difference between points for and against
4. Total number of points for
5. Aggregate number of points scored in matches between tied teams
6. Number of matches won excluding the first match, then the second and so on until the tie is settled

== Ground ==
=== Rudding Lane ===
Since 2015 the club has been based at Rudding Lane on the south-east outskirts of Harrogate, with access to the A658. The ground consists of a club house and four full size rugby pitches as well as parking for over 250 cars. Capacity around the main pitch is approximately 2,000 standing, with grass banking enabling spectators a clear view of the action.

=== Claro Road ===
Between 1896 and 2015 the club was based at Claro Road, in the centre of Harrogate. Claro Road had a capacity of around 4,500, with 4,000 standing and 500 seats split between the covered grandstand on one side with a smaller uncovered seating area on the other.

== Honours ==
- Division 4 North:
  - Winners (1): 1992–93
- National 7s:
  - Winners (1): 2001–02
  - Runner-up (1): 2002–03
- Yorkshire Cup:
  - Winners (12): 1905, 1907, 1949, 1965, 1981, 1991, 1992, 2002, 2003, 2015, 2016, 2017
- National League 3 (north v midlands) promotion play-off:
  - Winners (1): 2012–13
- North Premier
  - Runner-up (promoted from level 5): 2019–20
- Regional 1 North East:
  - Winners (1): 2023–24

== Women's team honours ==
- Women's Championship North 2
  - Winners (1): 2018–19
- Women's North 1 East
  - Winners (1): 2017–18
- Women's NC North 2 East
  - Runners-up (1): 2016–17
- Women's Junior Plate
  - Runners-up (1): 2017

== League record ==
- 1993–94 Division 4: 2nd — promoted
- 1994–95 Division 3: 7th
- 1995–96 Division 3: 6th
- 1996–97 Division 3: 5th
- 1997–98 National Division 1: 14th
- 1998–99 National Division 1: 12th
- 1999–00 National Division 1: 6th
- 2000–01 National Division 1: 5th
- 2001–02 National Division 2: 4th
- 2002–03 National Division 2: 4th
- 2003–04 National Division 2: 8th
- 2004–05 National Division 2: 10th
- 2005–06 National Division 2: 13th — avoided relegation due to league reshuffle.
- 2006–07 National Division 2: 14th — relegated
- 2007–08 National Division 3 North: 6th
- 2008–09 National Division 3 North: 5th
- 2009–10 National League 2 North: 4th
- 2010–11 National League 2 North: 6th
- 2011–12 National League 2 North: 14th — relegated
- 2012–13 National League 3 North: 2nd — promoted
- 2013–14 National League 2 North: 9th
- 2014–15 National League 2 North: 4th
- 2015–16 National League 2 North: 7th
- 2016–17 National League 2 North: 14th — relegated
- 2017–18 North Premier: 3rd
- 2018–19 North Premier: 3rd
- 2019–20 North Premier: 2nd — promoted
- 2020–21 National League 2 North: league not contested due to the COVID-19 pandemic in the United Kingdom
- 2021–22 National League 2 North: 16th (relegation avoided due to league reorganisation)

== International players ==
At least twelve former Harrogate players have gone on to win international caps.

- (England) Jonathan Callard
- (England) Peter Glover
- (England) Peter Larter
- (England) Roger Shackleton
- (England) Peter Squires
- (England) Carlton Troop
- (England) Martyn Wood
- (Scotland) Thomas Grant
- (Wales) Jeff Young
- (Ireland) Simon Easterby
- (Ireland) Guy Easterby
- (Switzerland) Lee Feurer
