= Huddersfield R.U.F.C. =

Rugby union club in Huddersfield, England

Huddersfield
- Full name: Huddersfield Rugby Union Football Club
- Nickname: The Field
- Founded: 1909; 117 years ago
- Location: Huddersfield
- Ground: Lockwood Park (Capacity: 1,500 (500 seated))
- Chairman: Alan Ellis
- President: Chris Evans
- Coach: Danny Brough
- Captain: Liam Parfitt
- League: Regional 1 North West
- 2025–26: 1st (promoted to National League 2 North)
Team kit

Official website
- huddersfieldrugby.com

Huddersfield Rugby Union Football Club is an English rugby union club based in Huddersfield, West Yorkshire, England. The team plays in Regional 1 North East following their relegation from National League 2 North at the end of the 2023–24 season. The club also competes in the Yorkshire Cup competition and play its home matches at Lockwood Park, which has a capacity of 1,500 with seating for 500. HRUFC also has an academy squad, feeding the senior team with new players. In 2026, the club's 2nd XV entered Counties 3 Yorkshire B division after a decision was made to introduce 2XVs into the league structure.

== History ==
Rugby football was first played in Huddersfield in 1869 and the club established in 1870. Matches were initially played at the Rifle Field in Trinity Street and then, with the amalgamation of the St John's Cricket Club, at Fartown from 1879.

Huddersfield was playing in the top ranks of English clubs when, in August 1895, the town hosted a meeting at the George Hotel and was one of the twenty clubs that resigned from the Rugby Union to set up The Northern Rugby Football Union, which allowed players to be compensated for 'Broken Time.' This meant they could claim for wages lost by playing on Saturdays. They were not allowed to make a living from the game – they were not 'professional.'

A new club was re-formed and named Huddersfield Old Boys in 1909. The club's first ground was at the United Cricket Club in Luck Lane with changing facilities at the Croppers Arms. World War I blew the whistle on the sport and games were not restarted until 1919 on a ground at Salendine Nook initially before the club took a lease on land at Waterloo. It was here that the club established their current colours of white, claret and gold. A stand was built and changing rooms completed for exclusive rugby use a luxury in those days. But the ground was plagued with drainage problems and another move was contemplated. In the event it was decided to buy the ground outright for £700 and invest in drainage. In 1935 £370 was invested in a new pavilion and bar and ladies were welcomed to a hitherto male bastion and they themselves began the tradition of post-match tea making. By 1964 the original pavilion was falling to bits and a new one, costing £11,000, was officially opened by Huddersfield's then MP J P W Mallalieu, himself a former Oxford Blue.

In 1946 the club changed their name to Huddersfield Rugby Union Football Club. The club sold part of its Waterloo property for £1.4 million to W Morrison's to help fund the purchase of the 26-acre (110,000 m^{2}) former brewery estate at Lockwood Park from Bass in 1996 to create a major sports complex backed by a £1.84 million Sport Council lottery grant.

The club won the Yorkshire Cup in 2011 for the first time, beating Hull RUFC 25–18 at York RUFC. The Huddersfield team which won the cup in 1890 was the direct antecedent of the Huddersfield Giants and is unconnected to the current Huddersfield RUFC.

== Current standings ==
2026–27 National League 2 North table
| Pos | Team | Pld | W | D | L | PF | PA | PD | TB | LB | Pts | Qualification |
|---|---|---|---|---|---|---|---|---|---|---|---|---|
| 1 | Sedgley Park | 8 | 8 | 0 | 0 | 420 | 111 | +309 | 8 | 0 | 40 | Promotion place |
| 2 | Darlington Mowden Park | 8 | 6 | 0 | 2 | 388 | 159 | +229 | 7 | 1 | 32 | Promotion play-off |
| 3 | Chester | 8 | 6 | 0 | 2 | 315 | 214 | +101 | 6 | 1 | 31 | |
| 4 | Tynedale | 8 | 6 | 0 | 2 | 252 | 221 | +31 | 6 | 0 | 30 | |
| 5 | Hull Ionians | 7 | 5 | 0 | 2 | 276 | 220 | +56 | 7 | 1 | 28 | |
| 6 | Preston Grasshoppers | 8 | 5 | 0 | 3 | 295 | 235 | +60 | 6 | 1 | 27 | |
| 7 | Harrogate | 8 | 3 | 1 | 4 | 204 | 328 | −124 | 6 | 0 | 20 | |
| 8 | Sheffield Tigers | 8 | 3 | 0 | 5 | 225 | 229 | −4 | 5 | 3 | 20 | |
| 9 | Fylde | 8 | 3 | 0 | 5 | 198 | 253 | −55 | 5 | 0 | 17 | |
| 10 | Billingham | 8 | 3 | 0 | 5 | 222 | 350 | −128 | 5 | 0 | 17 | |
| 11 | Huddersfield | 8 | 2 | 1 | 5 | 202 | 362 | −160 | 5 | 1 | 16 | |
| 12 | Heath | 8 | 2 | 0 | 6 | 188 | 282 | −94 | 4 | 1 | 13 | Relegation play-off |
| 13 | Otley | 7 | 1 | 0 | 6 | 183 | 292 | −109 | 4 | 1 | 9 | Relegation place |
| 14 | Wharfedale | 8 | 1 | 0 | 7 | 203 | 315 | −112 | 5 | 0 | 9 | Relegation place |

Updated to match(es) played on 2 September 2026. Source: National League Rugby
Rules for classification: If teams are level at any stage, tiebreakers are applied in the following order:
1. Number of matches won
2. Number of matches drawn
3. Difference between points for and against
4. Total number of points for
5. Aggregate number of points scored in matches between tied teams
6. Number of matches won excluding the first match, then the second and so on until the tie is settled

== Honours ==
- North 2 (east v west) promotion play-off winner (2): 2001–02, 2004–05
- North 1 v Midlands 1 promotion play-off winner: 2007–08
- Yorkshire Cup winners: 2011
- National League 3 North champions (2): 2013–14, 2016–17

== Notable players ==
The following players have appeared in a Yorkshire Cup (T'owd Tin Pot) final, or are county, or international representatives before/during/after their time at Huddersfield RUFC

- Luther Burrell
- Chris Johnson circa-2011
- Kearnan Myall
- Lee Paxman circa-2011
- Frank Sykes
- Gareth Widdop
- James Wood circa-2011

== Associated clubs ==
As well as being a rugby club Huddersfield RUFC also has clubs based at Lockwood Park catering for road running, astronomy and a bowling club in Yorkshire. Within the clubhouse is the Borough Club for the town's snooker players.

== Lockwood Park ==
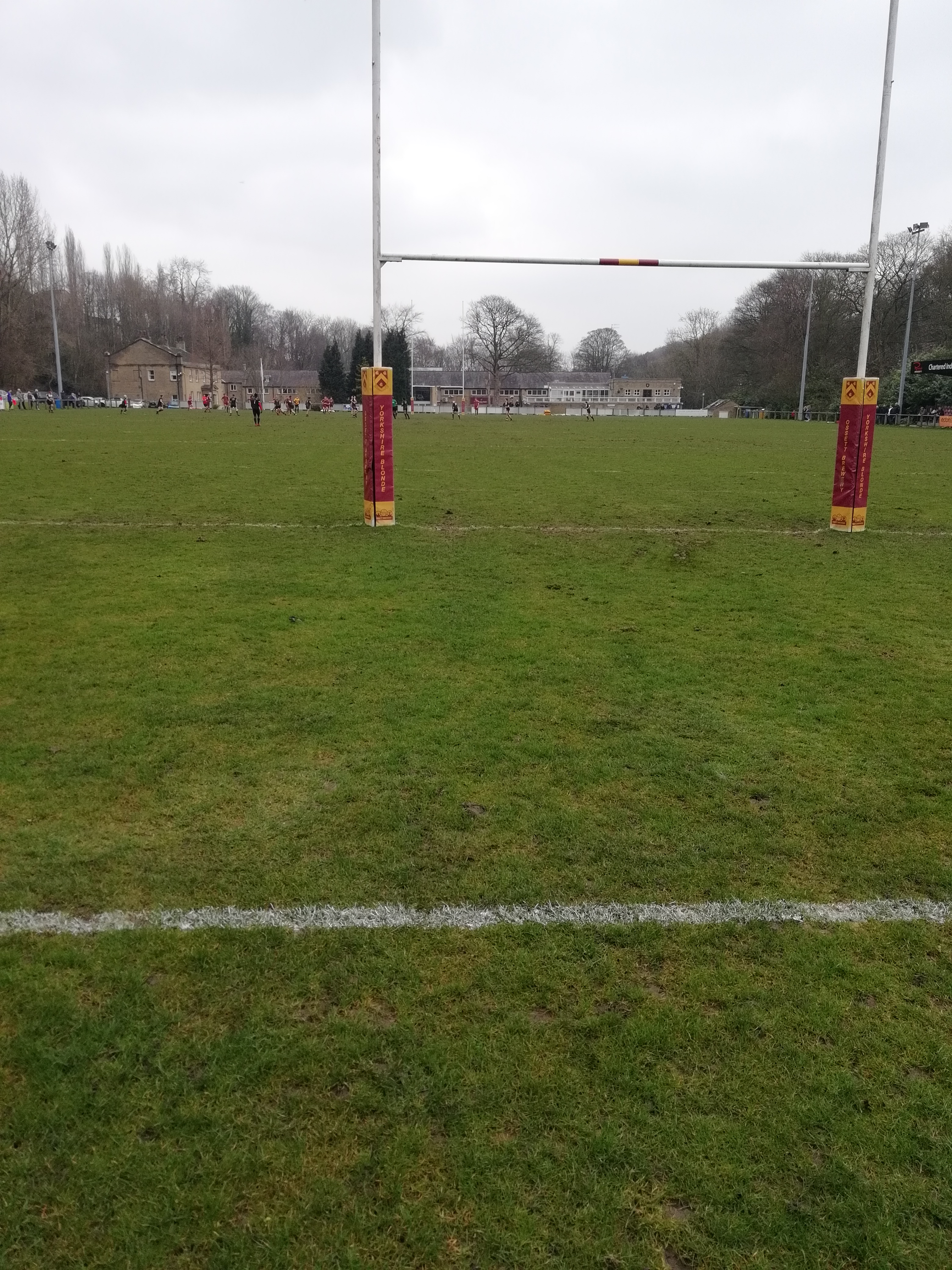
Lockwood Park, home venue of Huddersfield RUFC

Lockwood Park is the home of Huddersfield RUFC and is a multi-sports complex with a capacity of 1,500 (with seating for 500). It is also the home of Huddersfield Road Runners AC, Huddersfield Astronomical Society, HRUFC Bowling Club and the Borough Club which offers snooker facilities. It was also the home ground of the Huddersfield Giants Rugby League Academy and Scholarship teams, who enjoyed relative success whilst at Lockwood Park.
