= Hull Ionians =

Rugby union club in England

(England) Hull Ionians
- Full name: Hull Ionians Rugby Football Club
- Union: Yorkshire RFU
- Nickname: The I's
- Founded: 1989; 37 years ago
- Location: Brantingham, East Riding of Yorkshire, England
- Ground: Brantingham Park (Capacity: 1,500 (240 seated))
- Chairman: Stephen Townend
- President: Pat Wilson
- Coach: Graham Steadman
- Captain: James Sanderson
- League: National League 2 North
- 2025–26: 4th
Team kit

Official website
- hullionians.co.uk

Hull Ionians RUFC is a rugby union club in the East Riding of Yorkshire, England. The first team play in English rugby's National League 2 North, the fourth tier of the English rugby union system, following their relegation from National League 1 at the end of the 2019–20 season. Their home ground is Brantingham Park, which opened in September 1995 and is in the village of Brantingham, which is off the A63 road between Brough and South Cave.

== History ==
Hull Ionians was formed in 1989 by the merger of Hull and East Riding with Ionians.

The club has played in the upper echelons of regional rugby throughout its history but in 2012–13 the club won National Division 2 North and were promoted to National League 1 for season 2013–14. They were immediately relegated back to National League 2 North but were promoted the following season, playing at the third level of English club rugby for the second time.

Following a decision in 2026 to introduce 2XVs into the league structure, Ionians's 2nd XV entered Counties 2 Yorkshire A division.

== Honours ==
- North 1 v Midlands 1 promotion play-off winners (2): 2001–02, 2004–05
- National League 2 North champions (3): 2012–13, 2014–15, 2018–19

== Current standings ==
2026–27 National League 2 North table
Pos	Team	Pld	W	D	L	PF	PA	PD	TB	LB	Pts	Qualification
1	Sedgley Park	8	8	0	0	420	111	+309	8	0	40	Promotion place
2	Darlington Mowden Park	8	6	0	2	388	159	+229	7	1	32	Promotion play-off
3	Chester	8	6	0	2	315	214	+101	6	1	31	
4	Tynedale	8	6	0	2	252	221	+31	6	0	30	
5	Hull Ionians	7	5	0	2	276	220	+56	7	1	28	
6	Preston Grasshoppers	8	5	0	3	295	235	+60	6	1	27	
7	Harrogate	8	3	1	4	204	328	−124	6	0	20	
8	Sheffield Tigers	8	3	0	5	225	229	−4	5	3	20	
9	Fylde	8	3	0	5	198	253	−55	5	0	17	
10	Billingham	8	3	0	5	222	350	−128	5	0	17	
11	Huddersfield	8	2	1	5	202	362	−160	5	1	16	
12	Heath	8	2	0	6	188	282	−94	4	1	13	Relegation play-off
13	Otley	7	1	0	6	183	292	−109	4	1	9	Relegation place
14	Wharfedale	8	1	0	7	203	315	−112	5	0	9	Relegation place

Updated to match(es) played on 2 September 2026. Source: National League Rugby
Rules for classification: If teams are level at any stage, tiebreakers are applied in the following order:
1. Number of matches won
2. Number of matches drawn
3. Difference between points for and against
4. Total number of points for
5. Aggregate number of points scored in matches between tied teams
6. Number of matches won excluding the first match, then the second and so on until the tie is settled
