= Rugby Football Union Northern Division =

Rugby union governing body for the North of England

The Rugby Football Union Northern Division is the rugby union governing body for the North of England and is part of the Rugby Football Union.

== Constituent Bodies ==
- Cheshire
- Cumbria
- Durham County
- Lancashire
- Northumberland
- Yorkshire

== Leagues ==
It organises the following leagues:

- North Premier (tier 5)
- North 1 East (6)
- North 1 West (6)
- Lancs/Cheshire 1 (7)
- Lancs/Cheshire 2 (8)
- Lancs/Cheshire 3 (9)
- Cumbria 1 (7)
- Cumbria 2 (8)
- Durham/Northumberland 1 (7)
- Durham/Northumberland 2 (8)
- Durham/Northumberland 3 (9)
- Yorkshire 1 (7)
- Yorkshire 2 (8)
- Yorkshire 3 (9)
- Yorkshire 4 (10)

== Cups ==
Clubs also take part in the following national cup competitions:

- RFU Intermediate Cup
- RFU Senior Vase
- RFU Junior Vase

== See also ==
- London & SE Division
- Midland Division
- South West Division
- English rugby union system
