= Yorkshire Rugby Football Union =

(England) Yorkshire RFU
- Full name: Yorkshire Rugby Football Union
- Union: RFU
- Founded: 1869; 157 years ago
- Region: Yorkshire
- President: David A Hunter
Team kit

Official website
- yorkshirerfu.pitchero.com

The Yorkshire Rugby Football Union is the governing body responsible for rugby union in the historic county of Yorkshire, England. It is one of the constituent bodies of the national Rugby Football Union having formed in 1869, the union was formerly called Yorkshire County Club.

The county has won the county championship on 15 occasions, and finished as runners-up on a further eight occasions. The Yorkshire RFU also organises the Yorkshire Cup, which was inaugurated in 1878.

== History ==
=== Early years of County representative team ===
The first match arranged for the county of Yorkshire took place in 1870, at Leeds against Lancashire. This match was immediately known as the "Battle of the Roses" and was considered the "blue ribbon" of Northern rugby football. To be selected to represent the county was an honour bestowed long before the foundation of the Yorkshire RFU and it was seen as "the high road to International honours".

=== Formation of the Yorkshire Football Union ===
Any form of sporting interest with appeal to a Yorkshireman promptly engenders demand for a match with Lancashire. Before Rugby football had even acquired commonly acceptable laws or pattern of play Yorkshire and Lancashire were eager to compete with each other and from this eagerness grew, in course of time and through disharmonious days, the Rugby Football Unions of Yorkshire and Lancashire. A Yorkshireman, J. G. Hudson, was innovator; not of the Yorkshire Rugby Union, but of matches with Lancashire, which originated county Rugby, thereby demanding the creation of county authorities. Hudson was a founder of the Leeds Athletic Club which was built on the simple basis of a newspaper invitation to play football on Woodhouse Moor "from 7 to 8 o'clock a.m.". The Victorian virtue of early rising brought extension of playing hours; morning football came to start at 6.30 a.m.-presumably when daylight permitted-and either the power of the Press or the inherent fascination of the new pastime induced attendances of 500, participants in practice games numbering 60 to 150, all, apparently, served by one ball and goalposts consisting of broom handles identified by fluttering cotton. These practices on Woodhouse Moor were not conducted entirely for their own sake. There were other Northern nurseries of the same, or a similar, game and in 1864 matches were played against Sheffield. Winds of challenge blew across the Pennines; in 1865 Leeds played Manchester. This, of course, was not enough. Yorkshire had to meet Lancashire and at Hudson's instigation they did, so instituting county history in Rugby football. The first Yorkshire authority and the first Yorkshire team were representative of the county only in their representation of Leeds, Bradford, Huddersfield and Hull and no formal committee was required because no formal business had to be transacted. Match management was by venue, Leeds, Bradford, and Huddersfield finding the grounds and choosing the teams for home matches and Hull undertaking responsibility for away fixtures. The Northern counties are prideful communities and Rugby football quickly extended county pride and loyalties. Yorkshire's founding fathers, spurred by Harry Wharfedale Tennant Garnett of Bradford, wanted county matches to become occasions offering hospitality off the field as well as a contest in sport and to this end preparation was necessary. By 1874 the representatives of Leeds Athletic, Bradford, Huddersfield, Hull and York were meeting as a committee to promote county interests. They were a self-created authority, serving a current need and they sought to be no more than the machinery of a county club as distinct from a union of represented clubs within a geographical and administrative area. The committee of the five held county reins through a period of accumulating discontent as the Rugby game spread and the number of clubs increased. They were challenged in 1880 and, with no great show of enthusiasm, invited two other clubs to join them. They bent further before the wind in 1883 when they proposed a revised constitution, but dismissed a request for county organisation under elected members from Yorkshire clubs within the now established national Rugby Union. They conceded the inevitable in 1888 when the Yorkshire County Club formally became the Yorkshire Rugby Union.

== County side ==
The county side has reached the County Championship Final 23 times, winning the title on 15 occasions.

== Honours ==
Year	Winner
1889	Yorkshire
1890	Yorkshire
1892	Yorkshire
1893	Yorkshire
1894	Yorkshire
1895	Yorkshire

Year	Winners	Home team	Score	Away team	Venue	Notes
1896	Yorkshire	Surrey	4–16	Yorkshire	Athletic Ground, Richmond	
1910	Gloucestershire	Gloucestershire	23–0	Yorkshire	Kingsholm Stadium, Gloucester	
1911	Devon	Yorkshire	3–12	Devon	Kirkstall, Leeds	
1920	Gloucestershire	Yorkshire	3-27	Gloucestershire	Bradford	
1926	Yorkshire	Yorkshire	15–14	Hampshire	Bradford	
1928	Yorkshire	Yorkshire	12–8	Cornwall	Bradford	
1953	Yorkshire	Yorkshire	11–3	East Midlands	Bradford	
1957	Devon	Devon	12–3	Yorkshire	Home Park, Plymouth	
1963	Warwickshire	Warwickshire	13–10	Yorkshire	Coundon Road Stadium, Coventry	
1983	Gloucestershire	Gloucestershire	19–7	Yorkshire	Memorial Stadium, Bristol	

From 1984 all Championship finals were played at Twickenham Stadium.

Year	Winners	Score	Runner's Up	Venue	Notes
1987	Yorkshire	22–11	Middlesex	Twickenham Stadium	
1991	Cornwall	29–20	Yorkshire	Twickenham Stadium	After Extra Time (AET)
1993	Lancashire	9–6	Yorkshire	Twickenham Stadium	
1994	Yorkshire	26–3	Durham County	Twickenham Stadium	
2000	Yorkshire	16–9	Devon	Twickenham Stadium	
2001	Yorkshire	47–19	Cornwall	Twickenham Stadium	Challenge match
2008	Yorkshire	33–13	Devon	Twickenham Stadium	

== Games played against international opposition ==
Year	Date	Opponent	Result	Score	Tour	Ground	Notes
1888	12 December	New Zealand Natives	Loss	See notes	1888–89 New Zealand Native football team tour	Manningham, Bradford	The Natives won by 2 goals, 4 tries, 2 minors to Yorkshire's 1 goal, 3 tries, 6 minors.
1889	19 January	New Zealand Natives	Win	see notes	1888–89 New Zealand Native football team tour	Belle Vue (Wakefield), Wakefield	Yorkshire won by 5 goals, 1 try, 6 minors to Natives' 1 goal, 1 try, 1 minor.
1905	13 December	New Zealand	Loss	0-40	The Original All Blacks	Headingley, Leeds	
1906	13 October	South Africa	Loss	0-34	1906–07 South Africa rugby union tour	Headingley, Leeds	
1908	21 November	Australia	Loss	0-24	1908–09 Australia rugby union tour of Britain	Belle Vue (Wakefield), Wakefield	
1919	13 October	New Zealand Army	Loss	5-41	New Zealand Army tour	Lidgett Green, Bradford	Game marked the opening of Bradford RFC's new ground at Lidgett Green
1924	18 October	New Zealand	Loss	4-42	1924–25 New Zealand rugby union tour of Britain, Ireland and France	Lidgett Green, Bradford	
1926	27 October	New Zealand Maori	Loss	9-17	1926–27 New Zealand Māori rugby union tour	Lidgett Green, Bradford	

== Games played against international opposition by composite teams including Yorkshire ==
Year	Date	Opponent	Result	Score	Tour	Ground	Notes
1927	8 October	New South Wales	Loss	3-9	1927–28 Waratahs tour of the British Isles, France and Canada	Lidgett Green, Bradford	Joint Yorkshire and Cumberland XV
1932	6 January	South Africa	Loss	5-27	1931–32 South Africa rugby union tour	Workington	Joint Yorkshire and Cumberland XV
1935	21 September	New Zealand	Loss	3-14	1935–36 New Zealand rugby union tour of Britain, Ireland and Canada	Lidgett Green, Bradford	Joint Yorkshire and Cumberland XV
1946	February	New Zealand Army	Loss	0-41	1946 New Zealand army tour	Manchester	Joint Lancashire, Yorkshire and Cumberland XV
1947	18 October	Australia	Loss	0-25	1947–48 Australia rugby union tour of Britain, Ireland, France and North America	Workington	Joint Yorkshire, Westmoreland and Cumberland XV

== Notable players for the County side ==
See Yorkshire County RFU players

Notes; ★ RFU President

== Club sides ==
Amongst the clubs falling within the Yorkshire Rugby Football Union are several clubs of national renown including; Doncaster R.F.C., Hull Ionians, Leeds Tykes, Rotherham R.U.F.C., Wakefield RFC (now non-playing), and Wharfedale R.U.F.C.

Rugby league clubs that were members of the Yorkshire RFU before switching codes during or shortly after the schism include Batley, Bradford, Halifax, Huddersfield, Hunslet, Hull FC, Hull Kingston Rovers, Keighley, Leeds, Wakefield Trinity and York.

== Affiliated club sides ==
There are currently 94 clubs affiliated with the Yorkshire RFU, most of which have teams at both senior and junior level. These clubs are based in the districts that make up modern Yorkshire - East Riding of Yorkshire, North Yorkshire, South Yorkshire and West Yorkshire.

A

- Acklam (website)
- Adwick Le Street (website)
- Aireborough (website)

B

- Baildon (website)
- Barnsley (website)
- Beverley (website)
- Bradford & Bingley (website)
- Bradford Salem (website)
- Bramley Phoenix (website)
- Bridlington (website)
- Burley (website)

C

- Castleford (website)
- Cleckheaton (website)

D

- Dinnington (website)
- Doncaster Knights (website)
- Doncaster Phoenix (website)
- Driffield (website)

G

- Garforth (website)
- Goole (website)

H

- Halifax (website)
- Halifax Vandals (website)
- Harrogate (website)
- Harrogate Pythons (website)
- Heath (website)
- Hemsworth (website)
- Hessle (website)
- Hornsea (website)
- Huddersfield (website)
- Huddersfield Y.M.C.A. (website)
- Hull (website)
- Hull Ionians (website)
- Hullensians (website)

I

- Ilkley (website)

K

- Keighley (website)
- Knaresborough (website)
- Knottingley (website)

L

- Leeds Corinthians (website)
- Leeds Medics & Dentists (website)
- Leeds Tykes (website)
- Leodiensians (website)

M

- Malton & Norton (website)
- Marist (website)
- Middlesbrough (website)
- Moortown (website)
- Morley (website)
- Mosborough (website)

N

- Nestle Rowntree (website)
- Northallerton (website)
- North Ribblesdale (website)

O

- Old Brodleians (website)
- Old Crossleyans (website)
- Old Grovians (website)
- Old Modernians (website)
- Old Otliensians (website)
- Old Rishworthians (website Archived 16 May 2014 at the Wayback Machine)
- Ossett (website)
- Otley (website)

P

- Pocklington (website)
- Pontefract (website)

R

- Rawmarsh (website)
- Redcar (website)
- Richmondshire (website)
- Ripon (website)
- Rodillians (website)
- Rossington (website)
- Rotherham Clifton (website)
- Rotherham Phoenix (website)
- Rotherham Titans (website)
- Roundhegian (website)

S

- Sandal (website)
- Scarborough (website)
- Selby (website)
- Sheffield (website)
- Sheffield Medicals (website)
- Sheffield Oaks (website)
- Sheffield Tigers (website)
- Skipton (website)
- Stocksbridge (website)

T

- Thirsk (website)
- Thornensians (website)

W

- Wakefield (Note: Despite going into liquidation and ceasing to exist in 2004, Wakefield remain as non-playing members of the Yorkshire RFU.)
- Wath-upon-Dearne (website)
- Wensleydale (website)
- West Leeds (website)
- West Park Leeds (website)
- Wetherby (website)
- Wharfedale (website)
- Wheatley Hills (website)
- Whitby (Whitby website)
- Wibsey (website)
- Withernsea (website)

Y

- Yarnbury (website)
- York (website)
- York Railway Institute (website)

== County club competitions ==
The Yorkshire RFU currently runs the following competitions for club sides based in the districts that make up modern day Yorkshire - East Riding of Yorkshire, North Yorkshire, South Yorkshire and West Yorkshire:

=== Leagues ===
- Counties 1 Yorkshire - league ranked at tier 7 of the English rugby union system
- Counties 2 Yorkshire - tier 8 league
- Counties 3 Yorkshire - tier 9 league
- Counties 4 Yorkshire - tier 10 league

=== Cups ===
- Yorkshire Cup - founded in 1877, open to clubs at tiers 4-6 of the English rugby union system
- Yorkshire Shield
- Yorkshire Trophy
- Yorkshire Vase

=== Discontinued competitions ===
- Yorkshire 4 - tier 11 league that was restructured into Yorkshire 4 (North West) and Yorkshire 4 (South East) in 2017
- Yorkshire 5 - tier 11 league that was discontinued in 2017
- Yorkshire 6 - tier 12 league that was discontinued in 2010

== See also ==
- Northern Division
- English rugby union system
