= 2015 RFL Championship season results =

This is a list of the 2015 RFL Championship season results. The Championship is the second-tier rugby league competition in the United Kingdom. The season started on 13 February. 2015 is the first season to consist of a 12-team division, as part of the Rugby Football League's reform of the leagues.

The regular season will be played over 24 round-robin fixtures, where each of the twelve teams involved in the competition play each other, once at home and once away. In the Championship, points are only gained for a win, which are worth two points, or a draw, which is worth one point. No bonus points will be awarded this season.

The play-offs will commence after the round-robin fixtures. The top four teams in the Championship will qualify for "The Qualifiers", along with the bottom four teams in the Super League. Each team's points totals will be reset to zero and each team will play against each other once. The top three teams will qualify automatically for the Super League in 2016, the fourth and fifth-placed teams will contest the "Million Pound Game" at the venue of the fourth-placed team, with the winner also earning a place in the Super League for 2016, while the losing team and the bottom three teams will enter the Championship in 2016.

The fifth-twelfth placed teams in the Championship in 2015 will contest the "Championship Shield", where each team will play seven extra games, retaining their original points. The top four teams will contest play-offs, with the first-placed team facing the fourth-placed team and the second-placed team facing the third-placed team; The two winning teams will then contest the Championship Shield Grand Final. The bottom two teams will be relegated to League 1 in 2016.

== Regular season ==
=== Round 1 ===
Home	Score	Away	Match Information
Home	Score	Away	Date and Time	Venue	Referee	Attendance
Dewsbury Rams	19 – 10	Sheffield Eagles	13 February, 20:00 GMT	Tetley's Stadium	Matthew Thomason	1,309
Batley Bulldogs	30 – 6	Workington Town	15 February, 15:00 GMT	loverugbyleague.com Stadium	George Stokes	1,200
Leigh Centurions	36 – 24	Bradford Bulls	15 February, 15:00 GMT	Leigh Sports Village	Joe Cobb	7,449
London Broncos	26 – 22	Doncaster	15 February, 15:00 GMT	The Hive Stadium	Chris Leatherbarrow	976
Whitehaven	16 – 44	Halifax	15 February, 15:00 GMT	Recreation Ground	Mike Woodhead	1,022
Featherstone Rovers	28 – 14	Hunslet Hawks	16 February, 19:30 GMT	Bigfellas Stadium	Chris Kendall	1,450

=== Round 2 ===
Home	Score	Away	Match Information
Home	Score	Away	Date and Time	Venue	Referee	Attendance
Doncaster	6 – 13	Featherstone Rovers	22 February, 14:00 GMT	Keepmoat Stadium	Warren Turley	950
Bradford Bulls	34 – 4	Whitehaven	22 February, 15:00 GMT	Odsal Stadium	Chris Kendall	4,891
Hunslet Hawks	14 – 26	Batley Bulldogs	22 February, 15:00 GMT	South Leeds Stadium	Tom Crashley	901
Halifax	6 – 18	Leigh Centurions	22 February, 15:00 GMT	The Shay Stadium	Matthew Thomason	2,868
Sheffield Eagles	40 – 6	London Broncos	22 February, 16:15 GMT	Keepmoat Stadium	Dave Merrick	361

=== Round 3 ===
Home	Score	Away	Match Information
Home	Score	Away	Date and Time	Venue	Referee	Attendance
Batley Bulldogs	2 – 6	Halifax	1 March, 15:00 GMT	loverugbyleague.com Stadium	Joe Cobb	1,113
Featherstone Rovers	4 – 40	Bradford Bulls	1 March, 15:00 GMT	Bigfellas Stadium	Matthew Thomason	6,346
Hunslet Hawks	18 – 6	Dewsbury Rams	1 March, 15:00 GMT	South Leeds Stadium	Gareth Hewer	983
Leigh Centurions	25 – 12	London Broncos	1 March, 15:00 GMT	Leigh Sports Village	George Stokes	4,531
Whitehaven	6 – 20	Sheffield Eagles	1 March, 15:00 GMT	Recreation Ground	Chris Leatherbarrow	701
Workington Town	33 – 6	Doncaster	1 March, 15:00 GMT	Derwent Park	Andy Sweet	741

=== Round 4 ===
Home	Score	Away	Match Information
Home	Score	Away	Date and Time	Venue	Referee	Attendance
Bradford Bulls	56 – 6	Hunslet Hawks	8 March, 15:00 GMT	Odsal Stadium	Chris Leatherbarrow	5,019
Dewsbury Rams	23 – 16	Whitehaven	8 March, 15:00 GMT	Tetley's Stadium	Joe Cobb	911
Doncaster	18 – 54	Leigh Centurions	8 March, 14:00 GMT	Keepmoat Stadium	Jamie Bloem	1,602
Halifax	12 – 24	Featherstone Rovers	8 March, 15:00 GMT	The Shay Stadium	George Stokes	2,187
London Broncos	34 – 16	Workington Town	8 March, 15:00 GMT	The Hive Stadium	Matthew Thomason	300
Sheffield Eagles	28 – 16	Batley Bulldogs	8 March, 16:15 GMT	Keepmoat Stadium	Chris Kendall	1,358

=== Round 5 ===
Home	Score	Away	Match Information
Home	Score	Away	Date and Time	Venue	Referee	Attendance
Batley Bulldogs	19 – 26	Bradford Bulls	15 March, 15:00 GMT	loverugbyleague.com Stadium	George Stokes	2,223
Featherstone Rovers	6 – 40	Leigh Centurions	15 March, 15:00 GMT	Bigfellas Stadium	Chris Leatherbarrow	2,695
Halifax	26 – 13	Dewsbury Rams	15 March, 15:00 GMT	The Shay Stadium	Chris Kendall	1,734
Hunslet Hawks	32 – 12	Doncaster	15 March, 15:00 GMT	South Leeds Stadium	Andy Sweet	498
Whitehaven	18 – 16	London Broncos	15 March, 15:00 GMT	Recreation Ground	Jamie Bloem	689
Workington Town	12 – 14	Sheffield Eagles	15 March, 14:00 GMT	Derwent Park	Joe Cobb	682
Workington Town	18 – 31	Dewsbury Rams	18 March, 15:00 GMT	Derwent Park	Chris Leatherbarrow	761

=== Round 6 ===
Home	Score	Away	Match Information
Home	Score	Away	Date and Time	Venue	Referee	Attendance
Dewsbury Rams	28 – 38	Featherstone Rovers	27 March, 20:00 GMT	Tetley's Stadium	Warren Turley	1,798
London Broncos	22 – 18	Halifax	28 March, 15:00 GMT	The Hive Stadium	Gareth Hewer	724
Sheffield Eagles	28 – 14	Hunslet Hawks	29 March, 16:15 GMT	Keepmoat Stadium	Chris Leatherbarrow	1,136
Leigh Centurions	60 – 0	Whitehaven	29 March, 15:00 GMT	Leigh Sports Village	Robert Hicks	3,006
Doncaster	14 – 16	Batley Bulldogs	29 March, 14:00 GMT	Keepmoat Stadium	Tom Crashley	1,277
Bradford Bulls	36 – 6	Workington Town	29 March, 15:00 GMT	Odsal Stadium	Chris Kendall	4,238

=== Round 7 ===
Home	Score	Away	Match Information
Home	Score	Away	Date and Time	Venue	Referee	Attendance
Doncaster	4 – 26	Sheffield Eagles	1 April, 19:30 GMT	Keepmoat Stadium	Adam Gill	1,200
Batley Bulldogs	6 – 21	Dewsbury Rams	3 April, 19:30 GMT	loverugbyleague.com Stadium	Chris Leatherbarrow	1,274
Bradford Bulls	32 – 19	Halifax	3 April, 20:00 GMT	Odsal Stadium	Matthew Thomason	6,134
Featherstone Rovers	8 – 24	London Broncos	3 April, 19:30 GMT	Bigfellas Stadium	Mike Woodhead	1,654
Hunslet Hawks	6 – 42	Leigh Centurions	3 April, 14:00 GMT	South Leeds Stadium	Chris Kendall	1,132
Workington Town	40 – 0	Whitehaven	3 April, 15:00 GMT	Derwent Park	Tom Crashley	1,260

=== Round 8 ===
Home	Score	Away	Match Information
Home	Score	Away	Date and Time	Venue	Referee	Attendance
Dewsbury Rams	16 – 30	Bradford Bulls	6 April, 15:00 GMT	Tetley's Stadium	George Stokes	4,068
Featherstone Rovers	4 – 33	Sheffield Eagles	6 April, 18:00 GMT	Bigfellas Stadium	Joe Cobb	1,920
Halifax	32 – 24	Hunslet Hawks	6 April, 15:00 GMT	The Shay Stadium	Dave Merrick	1,540
Leigh Centurions	54 – 6	Workington Town	6 April, 13:30 GMT	Leigh Sports Village	Chris Leatherbarrow	3,017
London Broncos	25 – 18	Batley Bulldogs	6 April, 15:00 GMT	The Hive Stadium	Andy Sweet	638
Whitehaven	41 – 16	Doncaster	6 April, 15:00 GMT	Recreation Ground	Warren Turley	718

=== Round 9 ===
Home	Score	Away	Match Information
Home	Score	Away	Date and Time	Venue	Referee	Attendance
Batley Bulldogs	16 – 23	Featherstone Rovers	12 April, 15:00 GMT	loverugbyleague.com Stadium	George Stokes	916
Bradford Bulls	28 – 2	London Broncos	12 April, 15:00 GMT	Odsal Stadium	Joe Cobb	4,023
Doncaster	12 – 24	Dewsbury Rams	12 April, 14:00 GMT	Keepmoat Stadium	Tom Crashley	1,100
Halifax	38 – 6	Workington Town	12 April, 15:00 GMT	The Shay Stadium	Warren Turley	1,122
Hunslet Hawks	26 – 18	Whitehaven	12 April, 15:00 GMT	South Leeds Stadium	Chris Leatherbarrow	539
Sheffield Eagles	22 – 36	Leigh Centurions	12 April, 16:15 GMT	Keepmoat Stadium	Mike Woodhead	1,454

=== Round 10 ===
Home	Score	Away	Match Information
Home	Score	Away	Date and Time	Venue	Referee	Attendance
Doncaster	38 – 56	Bradford Bulls	26 April, 14:00 GMT	Keepmoat Stadium	Chris Kendall	2,276
Leigh Centurions	56 – 8	Batley Bulldogs	26 April, 15:00 GMT	Leigh Sports Village	Joe Cobb	3,036
London Broncos	16 – 20	Dewsbury Rams	26 April, 15:00 GMT	The Hive Stadium	Mike Woodhead	663
Sheffield Eagles	10 – 36	Halifax	26 April, 16:15 GMT	Keepmoat Stadium	Matthew Thomason
Whitehaven	12 – 36	Featherstone Rovers	26 April, 15:00 GMT	Recreation Ground	Andy Sweet	747
Workington Town	16 – 19	Hunslet Hawks	26 April, 15:00 GMT	Derwent Park	Tom Crashley	689
