= Counties 3 Yorkshire =

English rugby union league

- Current season or competition: 2023–24 Counties 3 Yorkshire
- Sport: Rugby union
- Instituted: 1987; 39 years ago
- Number of teams: 12
- Country: England
- Holders: Hemsworth (2nd title) (2022–23) (promoted to Counties 2 Yorkshire)
- Most titles: Aireborough, Heath, Hemsworth, Leeds Corinthians, Roundhegians, Wetherby, Wath upon Dearne, Yarnbury, Barnsley (2 titles)
- Website: England RFU

Counties 3 Yorkshire, previously known as Yorkshire 3, is an English rugby union league at the ninth tier of the domestic competition. Club rugby in Yorkshire operates without promotion play-offs meaning that the top two teams are automatically promoted to Counties 2 Yorkshire and the bottom two teams are relegated to Counties 4 Yorkshire. Each season a team from Counties 3 Yorkshire or Counties 4 Yorkshire may be picked to take part in the RFU Junior Vase - a national competition for clubs at levels 9–12.

== Participating clubs 2026-27 ==
Ahead of the new season a decision was taken to introduce 2XVs into the league(s) and to split the clubs out into A (North & East) and B (South & West) divisions.

== A Division ==
Departing were Leeds Corinthians and Wheatley Hills, both promoted to Counties 2 Yorkshire B, while Thornensians were relegated to Counties 4 Yorkshire C.

Wensleydale II were initially placed in the league but were reallocated to Counties 4 Yorkshire A before the season started.

Team	Ground	Capacity	City/Area	Previous season
Burley	Abbey Lane		Hawksworth, Leeds, West Yorkshire	8th
Hornsea	Hollis Recreation Ground		Hornsea, East Riding of Yorkshire	9th
Morley II	Scatcherd Lane	6,000 (1,000 seats)	Morley, West Yorkshire	New entry
Nestle Rowntree	Mille Crux		York, North Yorkshire	Promoted from Counties 4 Yorkshire (North) (champions)
North Ribblesdale II	Grove Park		Settle, North Yorkshire	New entry
Pocklington II	Percy Road		Pocklington, East Riding of Yorkshire	
Scarborough II	Silver Royd	4500 (425 seats)	Scalby, Scarborough, North Yorkshire	New entry
Selby II	Sandhill Lane		Selby, North Yorkshire	New entry
Skipton	Sandylands		Skipton, North Yorkshire	8th
West Park Leeds	The Sycamores		Bramhope, Leeds, West Yorkshire	4th
Wetherby II	Grange Park		Wetherby, West Yorkshire	New entry
York Railway Institute	New Lane		York, North Yorkshire	Promoted from Counties 4 Yorkshire (North) (runners-up)

Locations of the 2026-27 Counties 3 Yorkshire A teams

== B Division ==
Cleckheaton II were initially placed in the league but before the season began were reallocated to Counties 4 Yorkshire B.

Team	Ground	Capacity	City/Area	Previous season
Barnsley	Shaw Lane		Barnsley, South Yorkshire	7th
Castleford	Methley Pitch		Castleford, West Yorkshire	10th
Halifax	Ovenden Park		Halifax, West Yorkshire	Relegated from Counties 2 Yorkshire
Hemsworth	Moxon Fields		Hemsworth, Pontefract, West Yorkshire	4th
Huddersfield II	Lockwood Park	1,500 (500 seats)	Huddersfield, South Yorkshire	New entry
Maltby	Muglet Lane		Maltby, South Yorkshire	Promoted from Counties 4 Yorkshire (South) (champions)
Moortown II	Moss Valley		Alwoodley, Leeds, West Yorkshire	New entry
Old Brodleians II	Woodhead		Hipperholme, Halifax, West Yorkshire	New entry
Ossett	Queens Terrace		Ossett, Wakefield, West Yorkshire	Relegated from Counties 2 Yorkshire
Pontefract II	Moor Lane		Pontefract, West Yorkshire	New entry
Rotherham Phoenix	Rotherham Rugby Club		Rotherham, South Yorkshire	5th
Yarnbury II	Brownberrie Lane		Horsforth, Leeds, West Yorkshire	New entry

Locations of the 2026-27 Counties 3 Yorkshire B teams
Locations of the 2026-27 Counties 3 Yorkshire B teams in Greater Leeds area

== Participating clubs 2025–26 ==
Departing were Old Otliensians and Halifax, both promoted to Counties 2 Yorkshire while Thirsk were relegated to Counties 4 Yorkshire (North).

In February 2026 Dearne Valley, promoted from Counties 4 Yorkshire (South) as champions, withdrew from the league, leaving eleven sides to contest the remaining fixtures.

Team	Ground	Capacity	City/Area	Previous season
Barnsley	Shaw Lane		Barnsley, South Yorkshire	10th
Burley	Abbey Lane		Hawksworth, Leeds, West Yorkshire	7th
Castleford	Methley Pitch		Castleford, West Yorkshire	9th
Hemsworth	Moxon Fields		Hemsworth, Pontefract, West Yorkshire	Relegated from Counties 2 Yorkshire (12th)
Hornsea	Hollis Recreation Ground		Hornsea, East Riding of Yorkshire	Promoted from Counties 4 Yorkshire (North) (champions)
Leeds Corinthians	Nutty Slack		Middleton, Leeds, West Yorkshire	5th
Rotherham Phoenix	Rotherham Rugby Club		Rotherham, South Yorkshire	6th
Skipton	Sandylands		Skipton, North Yorkshire	8th
Thornensians	Coulman Road		Thorne, South Yorkshire	11th
West Park Leeds	The Sycamores		Bramhope, Leeds, West Yorkshire	4th
Wheatley Hills	Brunel Road		Doncaster, South Yorkshire	3rd

Locations of the 2025–26 Counties 3 Yorkshire teams

== Participating clubs 2024–25 ==
Departing were Northallerton and Halifax Vandals, both promoted to Counties 2 Yorkshire while Sheffield Medicals were relegated to Counties 4 Yorkshire.

Team	Ground	Capacity	City/Area	Previous season
Barnsley	Shaw Lane		Barnsley, South Yorkshire	9th
Burley	Abbey		Hawksworth, Leeds, West Yorkshire	11th
Castleford	Methley Pitch		Castleford, West Yorkshire	6th
Halifax	Ovenden Park		Halifax, West Yorkshire	3rd
Leeds Corinthians	Nutty Slack		Middleton, Leeds, West Yorkshire	Relegated from Counties 2 Yorkshire (12th)
Old Otliensians	Chaffers Field		Otley, West Yorkshire	Promoted from Counties 4 Yorkshire (champions)
Rotherham Phoenix	Rotherham Rugby Club		Rotherham, South Yorkshire	5th
Skipton	Sandylands		Skipton, North Yorkshire	10th
Thirsk	Newsham Road		Thirsk, North Yorkshire	4th
Thornensians	Coulman Road		Thorne, South Yorkshire	Promoted from Counties 4 Yorkshire (runners up)
West Park Leeds	The Sycamores		Bramhope, Leeds, West Yorkshire	8th
Wheatley Hills	Brunel Road		Doncaster, South Yorkshire	7th

Locations of the 2024-25 Counties 3 Yorkshire teams

== Participating clubs 2023–24 ==
Departing were Hemsworth and Ossett, both promoted to Counties 2 Yorkshire. Thornensians (10th), Knottingley (11th) and Leeds Medics & Dentists (12th) were relegated to Counties 4 Yorkshire.

Team	Ground	Capacity	City/Area	Previous season
Barnsley	Shaw Lane		Barnsley, South Yorkshire	Relegated from Counties 2 Yorkshire (12th)
Burley	Abbey		Hawksworth, Leeds, West Yorkshire	3rd
Castleford	Methley Pitch		Castleford, West Yorkshire	9th
Halifax	Ovenden Park		Halifax, West Yorkshire	Promoted from Counties 4 Yorkshire (runners up)
Halifax Vandals	Warley Town Lane		Halifax, West Yorkshire	6th
Northallerton	Brompton Lodge		Northallerton, North Yorkshire	Relegated from Counties 2 Yorkshire (10th)
Rotherham Phoenix	Rotherham Rugby Club		Rotherham, South Yorkshire	Promoted from Counties 4 Yorkshire (champions)
Sheffield Medicals	Norton Playing Fields		Norton, Sheffield, South Yorkshire	8th
Skipton	Sandylands		Skipton, North Yorkshire	5th
Thirsk	Newsham Road		Thirsk, North Yorkshire	4th
West Park Leeds	The Sycamores		Bramhope, Leeds, West Yorkshire	7th
Wheatley Hills	Brunel Road		Doncaster, South Yorkshire	Relegated from Counties 2 Yorkshire (11th)

Locations of the 2023-24 Counties 3 Yorkshire teams

== Participating clubs 2022–23 ==
This was the first season following the RFU Adult Competition Review. The league was substantially similar to Yorkshire 3 with teams ranked 4th to 12th returning (1st to 3rd were 'promoted' to Counties 2 Yorkshire and the bottom two 'relegated' to Counties 4 Yorkshire) and supplemented by top 2 from Yorkshire 4 and one coming down from Yorkshire 2 so with five departing but only three arriving the league was reduced from 14 teams to 12.

Team	Ground	Capacity	City/Area	Previous season
Burley	Abbey		Hawksworth, Leeds, West Yorkshire	8th Yorkshire 3
Castleford	Methley Pitch		Castleford, West Yorkshire	4th Yorkshire 3
Halifax Vandals	Warley Town Lane		Halifax, West Yorkshire	6th Yorkshire 3
Hemsworth	Moxon Fields		Hemsworth, West Yorkshire	12th Yorkshire 3
Knottingley	Howard's Field		Knottingley, West Yorkshire	10th Yorkshire 3
Leeds Medics & Dentists	Weetwood Playing Fields		Weetwood, Leeds, West Yorkshire	Promoted from Yorkshire 4
Ossett	Queens Terrace, Ossett CC		Ossett, West Yorkshire	5th Yorkshire 3
Sheffield Medicals	Norton Playing Fields		Norton, Sheffield, South Yorkshire	9th Yorkshire 3
Skipton	Sandylands		Skipton, North Yorkshire	7th Yorkshire 3
Thirsk	Thirsk Athletic Club		Thirsk, North Yorkshire	Promoted from Yorkshire 4
Thornensians	Coulman Road		Thorne, South Yorkshire	Relegated from Yorkshire 2 (14th)
West Park Leeds	The Sycamores		Bramhope, Leeds, West Yorkshire	11th Yorkshire 3

Locations of the 2022-23 Counties 3 Yorkshire teams

== Participating clubs 2021–22 ==
The teams competing in 2021-22 achieved their places in the league based on performances in 2019–20, the 'previous season' column in the table below refers to that season not 2020–21.

Team	Ground	Capacity	City/Area	Previous season
Barnsley	Shaw Lane		Barnsley, South Yorkshire	Relegated from Yorkshire 2 (13th)
Bramley Phoenix	Grosmont Terrace		Bramley, Leeds, West Yorkshire	Promoted from Yorkshire 4 (champions)
Burley	Abbey		Hawksworth, Leeds, West Yorkshire	Promoted from Yorkshire 4 (runners-up)
Castleford	Methley Pitch		Castleford, West Yorkshire	8th
Harrogate Pythons	Station View		Harrogate, North Yorkshire	4th
Hemsworth	Moxon Fields		Hemsworth, West Yorkshire	11th
Knottingley	Howard's Field		Knottingley, West Yorkshire	3rd
Old Otliensians	Chaffers Field		Otley, West Yorkshire	5th
Ossett	Ossett Cricket and Athletic Club		Ossett, West Yorkshire	7th
Sheffield Medicals	Norton Playing Fields		Norton, Sheffield, South Yorkshire	10th
Skipton	Sandylands		Skipton, North Yorkshire	12th
West Park Leeds	The Sycamores		Bramhope, Leeds, West Yorkshire	Relegated from Yorkshire 2 (14th)
Wibsey	Northfield Road		Wibsey, Bradford, West Yorkshire	6th

Locations of the 2021-22 Yorkshire 3 teams in Leeds
Locations of the 2021–22 Yorkshire 3 teams

== Season 2020–21 ==
On 30 October 2020 the RFU announced that due to the coronavirus pandemic a decision had been taken to cancel Adult Competitive Leagues (National League 1 and below) for the 2020/21 season meaning Yorkshire 3 was not contested.

== Participating clubs 2019–20 ==
Team	Ground	Capacity	City/Area	Previous season
Aireborough	Nunroyd Park		Yeadon, West Yorkshire	13th (not relegated)
Baildon	Jenny Lane		Baildon, West Yorkshire	11th
Castleford	Methley Pitch		Castleford, West Yorkshire	5th
Halifax Vandals RUFC	Warley Town Lane		Halifax, West Yorkshire	9th
Harrogate Pythons	Station View		Harrogate, North Yorkshire	3rd
Hemsworth	Moxon Fields		Hemsworth, West Yorkshire	8th
Knottingley	Howard's Field		Knottingley, West Yorkshire	6th
Leeds Corinthians	Nutty Slack		Middleton, Leeds, West Yorkshire	4th
Old Otliensians	Chaffers Field		Otley, West Yorkshire	Relegated from Yorkshire 2 (14th)
Ossett	Ossett Cricket and Athletic Club		Ossett, West Yorkshire	Promoted from Yorkshire 4 (runners up)
Rotherham Phoenix	Herringthorpe Playing Fields		Clifton, Rotherham, South Yorkshire	7th
Sheffield Medicals	Norton Playing Fields		Norton, Sheffield, South Yorkshire	12th
Skipton	Sandylands		Skipton, North Yorkshire	10th
Wibsey	Northfield Road		Wibsey, Bradford, West Yorkshire	Promoted from Yorkshire 4 (champions)

Locations of the 2019–20 Yorkshire 3 teams

== Participating clubs 2018–19 ==
Team	Ground	Capacity	City/Area	Previous season
Aireborough	Nunroyd Park		Yeadon, West Yorkshire	6th
Baildon	Jenny Lane		Baildon, West Yorkshire	12th
Castleford	Methley Pitch		Castleford, West Yorkshire	5th
Halifax Vandals	Warley Town Lane		Halifax, West Yorkshire	Relegated from Yorkshire 2 (14th)
Harrogate Pythons	Station View		Harrogate, North Yorkshire	10th
Hemsworth	Moxon Fields		Hemsworth, West Yorkshire	7th
Knottingley	Howard's Field		Knottingley, West Yorkshire	8th
Leeds Corinthians	Nutty Slack		Middleton, Leeds, West Yorkshire	Promoted from Yorkshire 4 (runners up)
Leeds Modernians	Cookridge Lane		Cookridge, Leeds, West Yorkshire	4th
Rotherham Phoenix	Herringthorpe Playing Fields		Clifton, Rotherham, South Yorkshire	Promoted from Yorkshire 4 (champions)
Sheffield Medicals	Norton Playing Fields		Norton, Sheffield, South Yorkshire	9th
Skipton	Sandylands		Skipton, North Yorkshire	11th
Thornensians	Coulman Road		Thorne, South Yorkshire	Relegated from Yorkshire 2 (13th)
Wensleydale	Cawkill Park		Leyburn, North Yorkshire	3rd

Locations of the 2018–19 Yorkshire 3 teams in Leeds
Locations of the 2018–19 Yorkshire 3 teams

== Participating clubs 2017–18 ==
Team	Ground	Capacity	City/Area	Previous season
Aireborough	Nunroyd Park		Yeadon, West Yorkshire	8th
Baildon	Jenny Lane		Baildon, West Yorkshire	7th
Castleford	Methley Pitch		Castleford, West Yorkshire	12th
Harrogate Pythons	Station View		Harrogate, North Yorkshire	11th
Hemsworth	Moxon Fields		Hemsworth, West Yorkshire	Promoted from Yorkshire 4 (champions)
Knottingley	Howard's Field		Knottingley, West Yorkshire	3rd
Leeds Medics & Dentists	Weetwood Playing Fields		Weetwood, Leeds, West Yorkshire	5th
Leeds Modernians	Cookridge Lane		Cookridge, Leeds, West Yorkshire	6th
Northallerton	Brompton Lodge		Northallerton, North Yorkshire	4th
Old Otliensians	Chaffers Field		Otley, West Yorkshire	9th
Sheffield Medicals	Norton Playing Fields		Norton, Sheffield, South Yorkshire	Relegated from Yorkshire 2 (14th)
Skipton	Sandylands		Skipton, North Yorkshire	Promoted from Yorkshire 4 (runners up)
Stocksbridge	Coal Pit Lane		Stocksbridge, South Yorkshire	13th
Wensleydale	Cawkill Park		Leyburn, North Yorkshire	10th

Locations of the 2017–18 Yorkshire 3 teams in Leeds
Locations of the 2017–18 Yorkshire 3 teams

== Participating clubs 2016–17 ==
- Aireborough
- Baildon
- Castleford (relegated from Yorkshire 2)
- Goole
- Halifax
- Halifax Vandals (promoted from Yorkshire 4)
- Harrogate Pythons
- Knottingley (relegated from Yorkshire 2)
- Leeds Medics and Dentists
- Leeds Modernians
- Northallerton
- Old Otliensians
- Stocksbridge
- Wensleydale (promoted from Yorkshire 4)

== Participating clubs 2015–16 ==
- Aireborough
- Baildon
- Bramley Phoenix
- Goole (relegated from Yorkshire 2)
- Halifax (promoted from Yorkshire 4)
- Harrogate Pythons
- Leeds Medics and Dentists (relegated from Yorkshire 2)
- Leeds Modernians
- Northallerton
- Old Otliensians
- Rotherham Phoenix
- Stocksbridge
- Thornensians
- Wetherby (promoted from Yorkshire 4)

== Participating clubs 2014–15 ==
- Aireborough
- Baildon (relegated from Yorkshire 2)
- Bramley Phoenix
- Burley
- Castleford
- Harrogate Pythons
- Hemsworth
- Northallerton
- Old Grovians
- Old Modernians
- Old Otliensians (promoted from Yorkshire 4)
- Rotherham Phoenix
- Stocksbridge (promoted from Yorkshire 4)
- Thornensians

== Participating clubs 2013–14 ==
- Aireborough
- Bramley Phoenix
- Burley
- Castleford
- Goole
- Harrogate Pythons (promoted from Yorkshire 4)
- Hemsworth
- Leeds Medics and Dentists
- Northallerton
- Old Grovians (promoted from Yorkshire 4)
- Old Modernians
- Rotherham Phoenix
- Skipton (relegated from Yorkshire 2)
- Thornensians

== Participating clubs 2012–13 ==
- Aireborough
- Baildon
- Bramley Phoenix
- Burley
- Goole
- Hemsworth
- Hessle
- Leeds Medics and Dentists
- Northallerton
- Old Modernians
- Old Rishworthians
- Rotherham Phoenix
- Thornensians
- York Railway Institute

== Original teams ==
When league rugby began in 1987 this division contained the following teams:

- Airebronians
- Baildon
- Bradford Salem
- Bridlington
- Heath
- Knottingley
- Leeds CSSA
- Marist
- Northallerton
- Rodillians
- Yarnbury

== Yorkshire 3 honours ==
=== Yorkshire 3 (1987–1993) ===
The original Yorkshire 3 was a tier 11 league with promotion up to Yorkshire 2 and relegation down to Yorkshire 4.

Yorkshire 3
Season	No of Teams	Champions	Runners–up	Relegated Teams
1987–88	11	Bridlington	Marist	Northallerton, Bradford Salem
1988–89	11	Yarnbury	Old Otliensians	Heath, Leeds CSSA
1989–90	11	Leodiensian	Knottingley	Baildon
1990–91	11	Bradford Salem	Sheffield Oaks	Aireborians
1991–92	11	Wath upon Dearne	Old Modernians (Note: League restructuring due to the cancellation of Yorkshire 6 ahead of the 1992–93 season, meant seven clubs were promoted into Yorkshire 2 including Dinnington, West Leeds, Northallerton, Withernsea and Sheffield Tigers.)	No relegation (Note: League restructuring due to the cancellation of Yorkshire 6 ahead of the 1992–93 season, meant no clubs were relegated and nine clubs would be promoted from Yorkshire 4.)
1992–93	13	Hessle	Halifax Vandals	Baildon
Green backgrounds are promotion places.

=== Yorkshire 3 (1993–2000) ===
The creation of National 5 North for the 1993–94 season meant that Yorkshire 3 dropped to become a tier 12 league. A further restructure at the end of the 1995–96 season, which included the cancellation of National 5 North and the addition of North East 3 at tier 9, saw Yorkshire 3 remain at tier 12.

Yorkshire 3
Season	No of Teams	Champions	Runners–up	Relegated Teams
1993–94	13	Aireborough	Wibsey	Leeds YMCA
1994–95	13	Wetherby	Skipton	Burley
1995–96	13	Hullensians	Phoenix Park	Multiple teams (Note: Yorkshire league restructuring due to reintroduction of Yorkshire 6 ahead of the 1996–97 season saw nine clubs, including Marist, Ossett, Stanley Rodillians, York Railway Institute, Knottingley, Old Rishworthians, Mosborough, Heath, Leeds Corinthians, Baildon relegated from Yorkshire 3; Marist and Ossett, were relegated to Yorkshire 4, while the other seven relegated sides dropped into Yorkshire 5.)
1996–97	10	Huddersfield Y.M.C.A.	West Leeds	No relegation (Note: No relegation due to cancellation of Yorkshire 6 ahead of the 1997–98 season.)
1997–98	10	Hemsworth	Stanley Rodillians	Hornsea
1998–99	10	York Railway Institute	Heath	Wibsey, Old Modernians, Wetherby
1999–00	10	Leeds Corinthians	Moortown	Stanley Rodillians, Baildon, Stocksbridge
Green backgrounds are promotion places.

=== Yorkshire 3 (2000–present) ===
Northern league restructuring by the RFU at the end of the 1999–2000 season saw the cancellation of North East 1, North East 2 and North East 3 (tiers 7–9). This meant that Yorkshire 3 became a tier 9 league.

Yorkshire 3
Season	No of Teams	Champions	Runners–up	Relegated Teams
2000–01	12	Skipton	Malton and Norton	Hullensians, Sheffield Oaks, Moortown
2001–02	12	Heath	Malton and Norton	Hessle, Roundhegians, Barnsley
2002–03	12	Knottingley	Stocksbridge	Halifax Vandals
2003–04	12	Pocklington	Castleford	Leeds Corinthians, Wath upon Dearne
2004–05	12	Barnsley	West Leeds	Hemsworth, Bramley Phoenix
2005–06	12	Heath	York Railway Institute	Old Modernians, Castleford
2006–07	12	Yarnbury	Skipton	Stocksbridge, Northallerton
2007–08	12	Moortown	Castleford	York Railway Institute, Thornensians
2008–09	12	West Park Leeds	Hullensians (Note: Barnsley, Hessle, Goole, West Leeds and Doncaster Phoenix were also promoted. This was due to the restructure of the Yorkshire League increasing the number of teams in the divisions above, meaning that there were a lot of promotions at the end of this season.)	Wath upon Dearne
2009–10	12	Roundhegians	Old Rishworthians	Garforth
2010–11	12	Wath upon Dearne	Goole	Old Otliensians
2011–12	12	Roundhegians	Sheffield Medicals	Halifax Vandals
2012–13	14	Old Rishworthians	Baildon	York Railway Institute, Hessle
2013–14	14	Goole	Leeds Medics and Dentists	Skipton
2014–15	14	Old Grovians	Castleford	Hemsworth, Burley
2015–16	14	Wetherby	Thornensians	Rotherham Phoenix, Bramley Phoenix
2016–17	14	Halifax Vandals	Goole	Halifax (Note: Only 1 team relegated at end of season meaning 13th placed Stocksbridge were safe.)
2017–18	14	Northallerton	Otliensians	Leeds Medics & Dentists, Stocksbridge
2018–19	14	Wensleydale	Thornensians	Leeds Modernians
2019–20	14	Leeds Corinthians	Baildon	Aireborough, Rotherham Phoenix
2020–21	14	Barnsley	Harrogate Pythons	Old Otliensians
2024-25	Green backgrounds are promotion places.			

== Number of league titles ==
- Aireborough (2)
- Heath (2)
- Hemsworth (2)
- Leeds Corinthians (2)
- Roundhegians (2)
- Wetherby (2)
- Wath upon Dearne (2)
- Yarnbury (2)
- Barnsley (2)
- Bradford Salem (1)
- Bridlington (1)
- Goole (1)
- Halifax Vandals (1)
- Huddersfield Y.M.C.A. (1)
- Hullensians (1)
- Knottingley (1)
- Leodiensian (1)
- Moortown (1)
- Northallerton (1)
- Pocklington (1)
- Old Grovians (1)
- Old Rishworthians (1)
- Skipton (1)
- Wensleydale (1)
- West Park Leeds (1)
- York Railway Institute (1)

== See also ==
- Yorkshire RFU
- English rugby union system
- Rugby union in England
