= Tom Rock =

English rugby union player

Tom Rock (born 27 June 1984 (age 40) in Keighley, West Yorkshire) is a rugby union footballer who plays for London Welsh. His regular position is at full-back. He made his Tykes debut against London Irish on 8 September 2002.

Rock came through the Leeds Tykes Academy but moved onto Otley RUFC to enhance his first team opportunities. He returned to Leeds Tykes in 2006 to earn another chance with Leeds. Tom is the brother of fellow Leeds player Andy Rock.

Rock originally signed for Leeds from Keighley RUFC. He has played for England U-19 and in the 2005–06 season played in the National One Division with Otley RUFC. He is also friends with haydn Jenkins

Rock recently joined National Division One club London Welsh. Rock is now a director of rugby at Blaydon rfc.

Rock has since retired from the rugby world and has joined the Royal Air Force Regiment as an officer.
