= Keighley RUFC =

Rugby union club in Yorkshire, England

(England) Keighley
- Full name: Keighley Rugby Union Football Club
- Union: Yorkshire RFU
- Founded: 1920; 106 years ago
- Location: Keighley, West Yorkshire, England
- Ground: Rose Cottage (Capacity: 1,000 (84 seated))
- Chairman: Russ Gibson
- President: Graeme Sheffield
- Coach: Ben Sowrey
- Captain(s): Alfie Seeley & Max Wild
- League: Counties 1 Yorkshire
- 2024–25: 4th

Official website
- www.keighleyrufc.com

Keighley Rugby Union Football Club is a rugby union club based in Keighley, West Yorkshire, England. The club's 1st XV currently plays in Counties 1 Yorkshire and its 2nd XV plays in Counties 4 Yorkshire B division.

== History ==
Keighley R.U.F.C. (or the Keighlians Old Boys R.U.F.C. as it was originally named) was formed by a group of old boys of Keighley Grammar School in 1920. Its name was first changed to Keighlians R.U.F.C. and later to Keighley R.U.F.C. In the early years matches were played at a variety of venues in and around the town, before a more permanent playing area was secured on council land near to the gas works at Thwaites. In addition, for many years Keighley had a social club in Lord Street in the town centre.

The facilities at Thwaites were improved gradually over the years (surviving a near catastrophic fire in the 1960s) until finally the club moved to their present address at Utley in 1986, when Keighley played against Yorkshire to officially open the new ground. Among the Yorkshire team that day was former Keighley Colts player Martin Whitcombe who made a try scoring debut for the county against the club where he learnt to play rugby. Yorkshire went on that year to win the County Championship final at Twickenham.

The club now has playing facilities and a club house. In October 2017, the Keighley 1st XV pitch was replaced with an artificial grass pitch as part of the RFU's Rugby 365 scheme. In the 1947–48 season the club won both the Yorkshire Shield, and Yorkshire Cup competitions, beating Sheffield by 17 points to 0 in the Shield final at Otley and Otley by 14 points to 6 in the Cup final at Skipton.

The club field three senior sides on Saturdays and an under 17's side on Sundays, as well as a Veterans team that play several games throughout the season. In addition Keighley were one of the pioneers of mini rugby in Yorkshire in 1967 and now have a thriving junior section for all age groups from 7 years to 17 years.

With the formation of leagues in 1987, Keighley began life alongside Wharfedale RUFC and Rotherham RUFC in League North East One, where the team remained until reconstruction of leagues in 2000 placed Keighley in Yorkshire League One. After relegation in 2001, Keighley returned to Yorkshire League One in 2003–04 as League Two champions, where they remained until 2012. Following a second-place finish in Yorkshire 1's 2011–12 season, Keighley travelled to Alnwick RFC for a play-off against the Durham and Northumberland 1 runners-up. Keighley went on to record an 18–16 victory, gaining them promotion to North East 1. After narrowly missing out on North East 1 survival, Keighley dropped suffered a further relegation to Yorkshire 2. They returned to Yorkshire League One in 2015–16 as League Two runners-up.

Following relegation to Yorkshire 2 in 2019–20, a season cut short due to the impact of the pandemic, Keighley made a return to Counties 1 Yorkshire first time of asking as Champions in 2021–22. The 1st XV managed to set a club record score v Ripon (100–8) only to then set another v Thornensians (115–0). Following promotion, for the 2022–23 season, the leagues restructured and Keighley entered Counties 1 Yorkshire, in which they finished runners-up. During the 2023–24 season the 1st XV made the Yorkshire Shield final for the first time since 1948.

Keighley RUFC's junior teams have produced several players who have gone on to have outstanding rugby careers in both rugby union and rugby league. Most recently, Ellie Kildunne, who made her international debut in England Women's 79–5 win over Canada.

== Notable former players ==
- Neil Marklew – Otley RUFC
- Gary Moorby (rugby League) world record transfer to St Helens R.F.C.
- Tom Rock
- Andy Rock
- Peter Roe (rugby league) Bradford Northern
- Frank Whitcombe Jr Yorkshire Rugby Union
- Martin Whitcombe Leicester Tigers & England 'B'
- David Jeanes Great Britain 1972 Rugby League World Cup winner
- David Lister – Wharfedale RUFC & Yorkshire
- Ronnie Kelly – Sale RUFC, Harrogate RUFC & Yorkshire
- Marco Ferrazzano Keighley cougars & captain of Italia RL
- Sam Keighley
- Trevor Britten (scrum half RAF Germany 1960–61, nicknamed 'Dickie Jeeps')
- Ellie Kildunne – Gloucester-Hartpury Women's RFC, Wasps & Harlequins, England Women & England 7's

== Honours ==
- Yorkshire Cup winners: 1948
- Yorkshire Shield winners: 1948
- North East 1 runners-up: 1990–91
- Yorkshire 2 champions: 2002–03
- Durham/Northumberland 1 v Yorkshire 1 promotion play-off winners: 2011–12
- Yorkshire 2 runners-up: 2015–16
- Aire-Wharfe Plate winners (3): 2017–18, 2018–19 and 2023–24
- Yorkshire 2 champions: 2021–22
- Yorkshire 1 runners-up: 2022–23
- Yorkshire Shield runner-up: 2023–24

== See also ==
- List of English rugby union teams
