= Counties 2 Yorkshire =

English rugby union league

- Current season or competition: 2022–23 Counties 2 Yorkshire
- Sport: Rugby union
- Instituted: 1987; 39 years ago
- Number of teams: 14
- Country: England
- Holders: Keighley (1st title) (2021–22) (promoted to Counties 1 Yorkshire)
- Most titles: Scarborough (3 titles)
- Website: England RFU

Counties 2 Yorkshire, previously known as Yorkshire 2 is an English rugby union league at the eighth tier of the domestic competition for teams from Yorkshire. Club rugby in Yorkshire operates without promotion play-offs meaning that the top two teams are automatically promoted to Counties 1 Yorkshire and the bottom two teams are relegated to Counties 3 Yorkshire. Each season a team from Yorkshire 2 is picked to take part in the RFU Senior Vase - a national competition for clubs at level 8.

== Participating clubs 2026-27 ==
Ahead of the new season a decision was taken to introduce 2XVs into the league(s) and to split the clubs out into A and B divisions.

Departing were Bridlington and Old Otliensians promoted to Counties 1 Yorkshire while Halifax and Ossett were relegated to Counties 3 Yorkshire B.

== A Division ==
Baildon, Bradford & Bingley and Halifax Vandals were initially placed in the league before being reallocated to the B Division. Pocklington II were provisionally placed in the league but instead opted to compete in Counties 3 Yorkshire A.

Team	Ground	Capacity	City/Area	Previous season
Beverley	Beaver Park		Beverley, East Riding of Yorkshire	Relegated from Counties 1 Yorkshire (11th)
Driffield II	Show Ground		Driffield, East Riding of Yorkshire	New entry
Harrogate II	Rudding Lane	2,000	Harrogate, North Yorkshire	New entry
Hull Ionians II	Brantingham Park	1,500 (240 seats)	Brantingham, East Riding	New entry
Ilkley II	Stacks Field	2,000 (40 seats)	Ilkley, West Yorkshire	New entry
Leeds Corinthians	Nutty Slack		Middleton, Leeds, West Yorkshire	Promoted from Counties 3 Yorkshire
Leodiensian	Crag Lane		Alwoodley, Leeds, West Yorkshire	Relegated from Counties 1 Yorkshire (12th)
Malton & Norton II	The Gannock		Malton, North Yorkshire	New entry
Northallerton	Brompton Lodge		Northallerton, North Yorkshire	10th
Ripon	Mallorie Park		Ripon, North Yorkshire	5th
Wharfedale II	The Avenue	2,000	Threshfield, North Yorkshire	New entry

Locations of the 2026-27 Counties 2 Yorkshire A teams

== B Division ==
Harrogate II, Leeds Corinthians and Leodiensian were initially placed in the league before being reallocated to the A Division.

Team	Ground	Capacity	City/Area	Previous season
Baildon	Jenny Lane		Baildon, West Yorkshire	7th
Bradford & Bingley	Wagon Lane	4,000	Bingley, West Yorkshire	6th
Bramley Phoenix	The Warrels		Bramley, Leeds, West Yorkshire	8th
Halifax Vandals	Warley Town Lane		Halifax, West Yorkshire	9th
Heath II	West Vale		West Vale, Halifax, West Yorkshire	New entry
Huddersfield Laund Hill	Laund Hill Stadium		Nettleton Hill, Huddersfield, West Yorkshire	4th
Roundhegians	The Memorial Ground		Roundhay, Leeds, West Yorkshire	3rd
Sandal II	Milnthorpe Green		Sandal Magna, Wakefield, West Yorkshire	New entry
Sheffield II	Abbeydale Park	3,200 (100 seats)	Sheffield, South Yorkshire	New entry
Sheffield Tigers II	Dore Moor	1,000	Sheffield, South Yorkshire	New entry
Wath-upon-Dearne II	Moor Road		Wath-upon-Dearne, South Yorkshire	New entry
Wheatley Hills	Brunel Road		Doncaster, South Yorkshire	Promoted from Counties 3 Yorkshire

Locations of the 2026-27 Counties 2 Yorkshire B teams
Locations of the 2026-27 Counties 2 Yorkshire B teams in Greater Leeds area

== Participating clubs 2025–26 ==
Departing were Dinnington and Yarnbury, promoted to Counties 1 Yorkshire. Hemsworth were relegated to Counties 3 Yorkshire.

Team	Ground	Capacity	City/Area	Previous season
Baildon	Jenny Lane		Baildon, West Yorkshire	4th
Bradford & Bingley	Wagon Lane	4,000	Bingley, West Yorkshire	9th
Bramley Phoenix	The Warrels		Bramley, Leeds, West Yorkshire	10th
Bridlington	Dukes Park		Bridlington, East Riding of Yorkshire	Relegated from Counties 1 Yorkshire (13th)
Halifax	Ovenden Park		Halifax, West Yorkshire	Promoted from Counties 3 Yorkshire (runners-up)
Halifax Vandals	Warley Town Lane		Halifax, West Yorkshire	5th
Huddersfield Laund Hill	Laund Hill Stadium		Nettleton Hill, Huddersfield, West Yorkshire	8th
Northallerton	Brompton Lodge		Northallerton, North Yorkshire	11th
Old Otliensians	Chaffers Field		Otley, West Yorkshire	Promoted from Counties 3 Yorkshire (champions)
Ossett	Queens Terrace		Ossett, Wakefield, West Yorkshire	7th
Ripon	Mallorie Park		Ripon, North Yorkshire	3rd
Roundhegians	The Memorial Groun		Roundhay, Leeds, West Yorkshire	6th

Locations of the 2025-26 Counties 2 Yorkshire teams
Locations of the 2025-26 Counties 2 Yorkshire teams in Greater Leeds area

== Participating clubs 2024–25 ==
Departing were North Ribblesdale and Wath-upon-Dearne, promoted to Counties 1 Yorkshire. Leeds Corinthians were relegated to Counties 3 Yorkshire.

Team	Ground	Capacity	City/Area	Previous season
Baildon	Jenny Lane		Baildon, West Yorkshire	5th
Bradford & Bingley	Wagon Lane	4,000	Bingley, West Yorkshire	Relegated from Counties 1 Yorkshire (12th)
Bramley Phoenix	The Warrels		Bramley, Leeds, West Yorkshire	9th
Dinnington	Lodge Lane		Dinnington, South Yorkshire, Sheffield	8th
Halifax Vandals	Warley Town Lane		Halifax, West Yorkshire	Promoted from Counties 3 Yorkshire (runners-up)
Hemsworth	Moxon Fields		Hemsworth, Pontefract, West Yorkshire	11th
Huddersfield Laund Hill	Laund Hill Stadium		Nettleton Hill, Huddersfield, West Yorkshire	7th
Northallerton	Brompton Lodge		Northallerton, North Yorkshire	Promoted from Counties 3 Yorkshire (champions)
Ossett	Queens Terrace		Ossett, Wakefield, West Yorkshire	10th
Ripon	Mallorie Park		Ripon, North Yorkshire	4th
Roundhegians	The Memorial Groun		Roundhay, Leeds, West Yorkshire	6th
Yarnbury	Brownberrie Lane		Horsforth, Leeds, West Yorkshire	3rd

Locations of the 2024-25 Counties 2 Yorkshire teams in Greater Leeds area
Locations of the 2024–25 Counties 2 Yorkshire teams

== Participating clubs 2023–24 ==
Departing were Wensleydale and Harrogate Pythons, promoted to Counties 1 Yorkshire. Northallerton (10th), Wheatley Hills (11th) and Barnsley (12th) were relegated to Counties 3 Yorkshire.

Team	Ground	Capacity	City/Area	Previous season
Baildon	Jenny Lane		Baildon, West Yorkshire	3rd
Bramley Phoenix	The Warrels		Middleton, Leeds, West Yorkshire	8th
Dinnington	Lodge Lane		Dinnington, South Yorkshire, Sheffield	Relegated from Counties 1 Yorkshire (11th)
Hemsworth	Moxon Fields		Hemsworth, Pontefract, West Yorkshire	Promoted from Counties 3 Yorkshire (champions)
Huddersfield Laund Hill	Laund Hill Stadium		Nettleton Hill, Huddersfield, West Yorkshire	Relegated from Counties 1 Yorkshire (10th)
Leeds Corinthians	Nutty Slack		Middleton, Leeds, West Yorkshire	9th
North Ribblesdale	Grove Park		Settle, North Yorkshire	7th
Ossett	Queens Terrace		Ossett, Wakefield, West Yorkshire	Promoted from Counties 3 Yorkshire (runners-up)
Ripon	Mallorie Park		Ripon, North Yorkshire	5th
Roundhegians	The Memorial Groun		Roundhay, Leeds, West Yorkshire	Relegated from Counties 1 Yorkshire (12th)
Wath-upon-Dearne	Moor Road		Wath-upon-Dearne, South Yorkshire	4th
Yarnbury	Brownberrie Lane		Horsforth, Leeds, West Yorkshire	6th

Locations of the 2023-24 Counties 2 Yorkshire teams in Greater Leeds area
Locations of the 2023–24 Counties 2 Yorkshire teams

== Participating clubs 2022–23 ==
This was the first season following the RFU Adult Competition Review. The league was substantially similar to Yorkshire 2 with teams ranked 4th to 12th returning (1st to 3rd were 'promoted' to Counties 1 Yorkshire and the bottom two 'relegated' to Counties 3 Yorkshire) and supplemented by top 3 from Yorkshire 3 and so with five departing but only three arriving the league was reduced from 14 teams to 12.

Team	Ground	Capacity	City/Area	Previous season
Baildon	Jenny Lane		Baildon, West Yorkshire	7th Yorkshire 2
Barnsley	Shaw Lane		Barnsley, South Yorkshire	Champions Yorkshire 3
Bramley Phoenix	The Warrels		Middleton, Leeds, West Yorkshire	3rd Yorkshire 3
Harrogate Pythons	The Jim Saynor Ground		Harrogate, North Yorkshire,	Runners-Up Yorkshire 3
Leeds Corinthians	Nutty Slack		Middleton, Leeds, West Yorkshire	12th Yorkshire 2
Northallerton	Brompton Lodge		Northallerton, North Yorkshire	8th Yorkshire 2
North Ribblesdale	Grove Park		Settle, North Yorkshire	10th Yorkshire 2
Ripon	Mallorie Park		Ripon, North Yorkshire	11th Yorkshire 2
Wath-upon-Dearne	Moor Road		Wath-upon-Dearne, South Yorkshire	5th Yorkshire 2
Yarnbury	Brownberrie Lane		Horsforth, Leeds, West Yorkshire	9th Yorkshire 2
Wensleydale	Cawkill Park		Leyburn, North Yorkshire	6th Yorkshire 2
Wheatley Hills	Brunnel Road		Doncaster, South Yorkshire	4th Yorkshire 2

Locations of the 2022-23 Counties 2 Yorkshire teams

== Participating clubs 2021–22 ==
The teams competing in 2021-22 achieved their places in the league based on performances in 2019–20, the 'previous season' column in the table below refers to that season not 2020–21.

Team	Ground	Capacity	City/Area	Previous season
Baildon	Jenny Lane		Baildon, West Yorkshire	Promoted from Yorkshire 3 (runners-up)
Hullensians	Springhead Lane		Kingston upon Hull, East Riding of Yorkshire	Relegated from Yorkshire 1 (12th)
Keighley	Rose Cottage	800 (84 seated)	Keighley, West Yorkshire	Relegated from Yorkshire 1 (11th)
Leeds Corinthians	Nutty Slack		Middleton, Leeds, West Yorkshire	Promoted from Yorkshire 3 (champions)
North Ribblesdale	Grove Park		Settle, North Yorkshire	7th
Northallerton	Brompton Lodge		Northallerton, North Yorkshire	8th
Old Grovians	Woodhouse Grove School		Apperley Bridge, West Yorkshire	9th
Ripon	Mallorie Park		Ripon, North Yorkshire	5th
Thornensians	Coulman Road		Thorne, South Yorkshire	10th
Wath-upon-Dearne	Moor Road		Wath-upon-Dearne, South Yorkshire	4th
Wensleydale	Cawkill Park		Leyburn, North Yorkshire	3rd
Wetherby	Grange Park		Wetherby, West Yorkshire	12th
Wheatley Hills	Brunnel Road		Doncaster, South Yorkshire	6th
Yarnbury	Brownberrie Lane		Horsforth, Leeds, West Yorkshire	11th

Locations of the 2021–22 Yorkshire 2 teams in Greater Leeds area
Locations of the 2021–22 Yorkshire 2 teams

== Season 2020–21 ==
On 30 October 2020 the RFU announced that due to the coronavirus pandemic a decision had been taken to cancel Adult Competitive Leagues (National League 1 and below) for the 2020/21 season meaning Yorkshire 2 was not contested.

== Participating clubs 2019–20 ==
Team	Ground	Capacity	City/Area	Previous season
Barnsley	Shaw Lane		Barnsley, South Yorkshire	13th (not relegated)
North Ribblesdale	Grove Park		Settle, North Yorkshire	8th
Northallerton	Brompton Lodge		Northallerton, North Yorkshire	4th
Old Grovians	Woodhouse Grove School		Apperley Bridge, West Yorkshire	9th
Old Rishworthians	Hollas Lane		Copley, Halifax, West Yorkshire	Relegated from Yorkshire 1 (13th)
Ripon	Mallorie Park		Ripon, North Yorkshire	11th
Roundhegians	The Memorial Ground		Moortown, Leeds, West Yorkshire	7th
Thornensians	Coulman Road		Thorne, South Yorkshire	Promoted from Yorkshire 3 (runners up)
Wath-upon-Dearne	Moor Road		Wath-upon-Dearne, South Yorkshire	3rd
Wensleydale	Cawkill Park		Leyburn, North Yorkshire	Promoted from Yorkshire 3 (champions)
West Park Leeds	The Sycamores		Bramhope, Leeds, West Yorkshire	12th
Wetherby	Grange Park		Wetherby, West Yorkshire	10th
Wheatley Hills	Brunnel Road		Doncaster, South Yorkshire	5th
Yarnbury	Brownberrie Lane		Horsforth, Leeds, West Yorkshire	6th

Locations of the 2019–20 Yorkshire 2 teams in Leeds
Locations of the 2019–20 Yorkshire 2 teams

== Participating clubs 2018–19 ==
Team	Ground	Capacity	City/Area	Previous season
Barnsley	Shaw Lane		Barnsley, South Yorkshire	4th
Goole	Westfield Banks		Goole, East Riding of Yorkshire	5th
Leodiensian	Crag Lane		Alwoodley, Leeds, West Yorkshire	12th
North Ribblesdale	Grove Park		Settle, North Yorkshire	Relegated from Yorkshire 1 (13th)
Northallerton	Brompton Lodge		Northallerton, North Yorkshire	Promoted from Yorkshire 3 (champions)
Old Grovians	Woodhouse Grove School		Apperley Bridge, West Yorkshire	11th
Old Otliensians	Chaffers Field		Otley, West Yorkshire	Promoted from Yorkshire 3 (runners up)
Ripon	Mallorie Park		Ripon, North Yorkshire	7th
Roundhegians	The Memorial Ground		Moortown, Leeds, West Yorkshire	9th
Wath-upon-Dearne	Moor Road		Wath-upon-Dearne, South Yorkshire	6th
West Park Leeds	The Sycamores		Bramhope, Leeds, West Yorkshire	10th
Wetherby	Grange Park		Wetherby, West Yorkshire	8th
Wheatley Hills	Brunnel Road		Doncaster, South Yorkshire	Relegated from Yorkshire 1 (14th)
Yarnbury	Brownberrie Lane		Horsforth, Leeds, West Yorkshire	3rd

Locations of the 2018–19 Yorkshire 2 teams in Leeds
Locations of the 2018–19 Yorkshire 2 teams

== Participating clubs 2017–18 ==
Team	Ground	Capacity	City/Area	Previous season
Barnsley	Shaw Lane		Barnsley, South Yorkshire	7th
Goole	Westfield Banks		Goole, East Riding of Yorkshire	Promoted from Yorkshire 3 (runners up)
Halifax Vandals	Warley Town Lane		Halifax, West Yorkshire	Promoted from Yorkshire 3 (champions)
Leodiensian	Crag Lane		Alwoodley, Leeds, West Yorkshire	12th
Old Crossleyans	Broomfield Avenue		Halifax, West Yorkshire	13th
Old Grovians	Woodhouse Grove School		Apperley Bridge, West Yorkshire	10th
Pontefract	Moor Lane		Pontefract, West Yorkshire	3rd
Ripon	Mallorie Park		Ripon, North Yorkshire	6th
Roundhegians	The Memorial Ground		Moortown, Leeds, West Yorkshire	5th
Thornensians	Coulman Road		Thorne, South Yorkshire	9th
Wath-upon-Dearne	Moor Road		Wath-upon-Dearne, South Yorkshire	11th
West Park Leeds	The Sycamores		Bramhope, Leeds, West Yorkshire	8th
Wetherby	Grange Park		Wetherby, West Yorkshire	4th
Yarnbury	Brownberrie Lane		Horsforth, Leeds, West Yorkshire	Relegated from Yorkshire 1 (13th)

Locations of the 2017–18 Yorkshire 2 teams in Leeds
Locations of the 2017–18 Yorkshire 2 teams

== Participating clubs 2016–17 ==
- Barnsley
- Leodiensian
- Moortown
- Old Crossleyans (relegated from Yorkshire 1)
- Old Grovians
- Old Rishworthians
- Pontefract
- Ripon
- Roundhegians
- Sheffield Medicals
- Thornensians (promoted from Yorkshire 3)
- Wath-upon-Dearne
- West Park Leeds (relegated from Yorkshire 1)
- Wetherby (promoted from Yorkshire 3)

== Participating clubs 2015–16 ==
- Barnsley
- Castleford (promoted from Yorkshire 3)
- Keighley
- Knottingley
- Leodiensian
- Moortown
- Old Grovians (promoted from Yorkshire 3)
- Old Rishworthians
- Pontefract (relegated from Yorkshire 1)
- Ripon
- Roundhegians
- Sheffield Medicals
- Wath-upon-Dearne (relegated from Yorkshire 1)
- West Leeds

== Participating clubs 2014–15 ==
- Barnsley
- Bradford Salem
- Goole (promoted from Yorkshire 3)
- Keighley (relegated from Yorkshire 1)
- Knottingley
- Leeds Medics and Dentists (promoted from Yorkshire 3)
- Leodiensian
- Moortown
- Old Rishworthians
- Ripon
- Roundhegians
- Sheffield Medicals
- West Leeds
- West Park Leeds

== Participating clubs 2013–14 ==
- Baildon (promoted from Yorkshire 3)
- Barnsley (relegated from Yorkshire 1)
- Bradford Salem
- Hullensians
- Knottingley
- Leodiensian
- Moortown
- Old Rishworthians (promoted from Yorkshire 3)
- Ripon
- Roundhegians
- Sheffield Medicals
- West Leeds
- West Park Leeds
- Yarnbury

== Participating clubs 2012–13 ==
- Bradford Salem
- Castleford
- Doncaster Phoenix
- Hullensians
- Leodiensian
- Moortown
- Ripon
- Roundhegians
- Selby
- Sheffield Medicals
- Skipton
- West Leeds
- West Park Leeds
- Yarnbury

== Original teams ==
When league rugby began in 1987 this division contained the following teams:

- Doncaster
- Huddersfield Y.M.C.A.
- Ilkley
- Ionians (Note: Ionians would later merge with Hull & East Riding to form Hull Ionians for the 1989–90 season.)
- Leodiensian
- Malton & Norton
- North Ribblesdale
- Old Otliensians
- Sheffield Tigers
- Wath upon Dearne
- Wheatley Hills

== Yorkshire 2 honours ==
=== Yorkshire 2 (1987–1993) ===
The original Yorkshire 2 was a tier 10 league with promotion up to Yorkshire 1 and relegation down to Yorkshire 3.

Yorkshire 2
Season	No of Teams	Champions	Runners–up	Relegated Teams
1987–88	11	North Ribblesdale	Huddersfield Y.M.C.A.	Leodiensian, Old Otliensians
1988–89	11	Bridlington	Doncaster	Ionians, Marist
1989–90	11	Malton & Norton	York Railway Institute	Sheffield Tigers
1990–91	11	Old Otliensians	Leodiensian	Wath upon Dearne
1991–92	11	Bradford Salem	Goole (Note: League restructuring due to the cancellation of Yorkshire 6 ahead of the 1992–93 season, meant five clubs were promoted into Yorkshire 1 including Wheatley Hills, Yarnbury and Sheffield Oaks.)	No relegation (Note: League restructuring due to the cancellation of Yorkshire 6 ahead of the 1992–93 season, meant no clubs were relegated and seven clubs would be promoted from Yorkshire 3.)
1992–93	13	Wath upon Dearne	Ilkley	Knottingly
Green backgrounds are promotion places.

=== Yorkshire 2 (1993–2000) ===
The creation of National 5 North for the 1993–94 season meant that Yorkshire 2 dropped to become a tier 11 league. A further restructure at the end of the 1995–96 season, which included the cancellation of National 5 North and the addition of North East 3 at tier 9, saw Yorkshire 2 remain at tier 11.

Yorkshire 2
Season	No of Teams	Champions	Runners–up	Relegated Teams
1993–94	13	Barnsley	Castleford	Leeds CSSA
1994–95	13	Wibsey	Halifax Vandals	York Railway Institute
1995–96	13	Northallerton	Moortown	Multiple teams (Note: Yorkshire league restructuring due to reintroduction of Yorkshire 6 ahead of the 1996–97 season meant that seven clubs, including Skipton, West Leeds, Aireborough, Hemsworth, Hessle, Wetherby, Huddersfield Y.M.C.A., were relegated into Yorkshire 3.)
1996–97	10	Castleford	Dinnington	Phoenix Park
1997–98	9	Huddersfield Y.M.C.A.	West Leeds	Old Modernians
1998–99	10	Scarborough	Hemsworth	Stanley Rodillians, Barnsley, Moortown
1999–00	10	Dinnington	Sheffield Tigers	Bramley Phoenix, Hullensians, Old Otliensians
Green backgrounds are promotion places.

=== Yorkshire 2 (2000–present) ===
Northern league restructuring by the RFU at the end of the 1999–2000 season saw the cancellation of North East 1, North East 2 and North East 3 (tiers 7–9). This meant that Yorkshire 2 became a tier 8 league.

Yorkshire 2
Season	No of Teams	Champions	Runners–up	Relegated Teams
2000–01	12	Scarborough	Sheffield Tigers	Wath Upon Dearne, Bradford Salem, Roundhegians
2001–02	12	Huddersfield Y.M.C.A.	Dinnington	Hemsworth, Castleford, York Railway Institute
2002–03	12	Keighley	Malton and Norton	Pocklington, Northallerton
2003–04	12	Beverley	Ilkley	Skipton, West Leeds
2004–05	12	Sheffield Tigers	Bradford Salem	Castleford, Heath
2005–06	12	Scarborough	Old Brodleians	West Leeds, Yarnbury
2006–07	12	Selby	Heath	York Railway Institute, Barnsley
2007–08	12	Old Brodleians	Skipton	West Park Leeds, Goole
2008–09	11	Wheatley Hills	Castleford (Note: Dinnington and Yarnbury were also promoted.)	No relegation (Note: No relegation as division due to increase from 11 to 14 teams for the following season.)
2009–10	14	North Ribblesdale	Knottingley	Hessle, Goole
2010–11	14	Pocklington	Huddersfield Y.M.C.A.	Old Rishworthians, Roundhegians
2011–12	14	Barnsley	Wath Upon Dearne	Goole
2012–13	14	Selby	Doncaster Phoenix	Castleford, Skipton
2013–14	14	Yarnbury	Hullensians	Baildon
2014–15	14	Bradford Salem	West Park Leeds	Leeds Medics and Dentists, Goole
2015–16	14	West Leeds	Keighley	Castleford, Knottingley
2016–17	14	Moortown	Old Rishworthians	Sheffield Medicals (Note: Only 1 team relegated this season meaning 13th placed Old Crossleyans were safe.)
2017–18	14	Pontefract	Old Crossleyans	Halifax Vandals, Thornensians
2018–19	14	Goole	Leodiensian	Old Otliensians
2019–20	14	Roundhegians	Old Rishworthians	West Park Leeds, Barnsley
2020–21	14			
Green backgrounds are promotion places.

== Number of league titles ==
- Scarborough (3)
- Barnsley (2)
- Bradford Salem (2)
- Huddersfield Y.M.C.A. (2)
- North Ribblesdale (2)
- Selby (2)
- Beverley (1)
- Bridlington (1)
- Castleford (1)
- Dinnington (1)
- Goole (1)
- Keighley (2)
- Malton & Norton (1)
- Moortown (1)
- Northallerton (1)
- Old Brodleians (1)
- Old Otliensians (1)
- Pocklington (1)
- Pontefract (1)
- Roundhegians (1)
- Sheffield Tigers (1)
- Wath upon Dearne (1)
- West Leeds (1)
- Wheatley Hills (1)
- Wibsey (1)
- Yarnbury (1)

== See also ==
- Yorkshire RFU
- English rugby union system
- Rugby union in England
