= Hessle RUFC =

English rugby union club, based in Hessle, Yorkshire

- Union: Yorkshire RFU
- Nickname: The Stags
- Founded: 1886; 140 years ago
- Location: Hessle, East Riding of Yorkshire, England
- Ground: Livingstone Road
- Chairman: David Leeman
- Coach: Stuart Crooks
- Captain: Steven Dingley
- Top scorer: Lee Rollinson
- League: Counties 4 Yorkshire
- 2025-26: 4th (Premier)
1st kit	2nd kit

Official website
- www.hesslerugby.co.uk

Hessle Rugby Union Football Club is an English Rugby Union team based in Hessle, East Riding of Yorkshire. The 1st XV currently plays in Counties 4 Yorkshire South Division.

== History ==
The exact date of formation is unknown however the earliest records come from a newspaper article documenting Hessle's loss to Hull Kingston Rovers in 1886.

Hessle reached their highest level of play in 2009/2010 playing in Yorkshire 2, the eight tier of the domestic competition for teams in Yorkshire.

== Club honours ==
- Yorkshire Shield Winners (2): 1965, 1975
- Yorkshire 4 champions (2): 1988–89, 2007–08
- Yorkshire Silver Trophy Winners: 1989
- Yorkshire 3 champions: 1992–93
- Yorkshire 5 champions: 2014–15
