= Halifax Vandals RUFC =

English rugby union club, based in Halifax

Halifax Vandals
- Full name: Halifax Vandals Rugby Union Football Club
- Union: Yorkshire RFU
- Nickname(s): Vandals, Van
- Founded: 1923; 103 years ago
- Location: Warley Town, Halifax, England
- Region: West Yorkshire
- Ground: Mount Doom
- Chairman: Neil Crossley
- Coach: James Wainright
- Captain(s): Danny Mitchell (1st XV); Ben Simms (2nd XV)
- League(s): Counties 2 Yorkshire (1st XV); AWW/Central/North Merit (2nd XV)
- 2024–25: 5th

Official website
- www.halifaxvandals.co.uk

Halifax Vandals RUFC is an amateur rugby union club based in Warley Town, Halifax. They currently run two senior sides. The 1st XV plays in Counties 2 Yorkshire while the 2nd XV plays in the AWW/Central/North Merit League.

== History ==
=== Formation ===
Halifax Vandals was formed in November 1923 when a group of college students met under a lamp post on Francis Street in Halifax to form a rugby club. The name "Vandal" is attributed to a warrior tribe who fought against the Roman Empire in 455 AD and came out victorious.

=== Modern History ===
In the early days, their existence was somewhat nomadic, using the facilities in the village pub, The Maypole Inn, before acquiring the former school house opposite. With the formation of the national league system in 1987 Halifax Vandals was one of the original members of Yorkshire 5, being the first ever winners of the competition being promoted to Yorkshire 4.

In the 2003–04 season they were relegated back to Yorkshire 5 however was promoted back in Yorkshire 4 the following season. Once again in the 2007–08 season the Vandals were champions Yorkshire 5, this caused them to have the joint record for titles for the now defunct Yorkshire 5.

In 2015–16 they became champions of Yorkshire 4, and went onto go back to back becoming champions of Yorkshire 3. However they were relegated from Yorkshire 2 after only one season.

=== Rivalries ===
The Warley-based club have a long-standing rivalry with Old Rishworthians and more recently, with Halifax RUFC. With Halifax RUFC joining the Vandals in Counties 3 Yorkshire for the 2023–24 season then led by former player coach Jamie Bloem the rivalry between the two clubs grew even more.

=== Recent Success ===
Following promotion is 2023-24 season, Vandals cemented themselves as a club that belonged in Yorkshire 2, and will be joined by the local rivals Halifax RUFC in the 2025-26 season. Many former Vandals now play for Halifax RUFC.

== Club honours ==
=== 1st XV ===
- Yorkshire Silver Trophy
  - Champions: (2) 1991–92, 2023-24
- Yorkshire 5
  - Champions: (3) 1987–88, 2004–05, 2007–08
- Counties 4 Yorkshire
  - Champions: (1) 2015–16
  - Runners-up: (1) 1991-92
- Counties 3 Yorkshire
  - Champions: (1) 2016–17
  - Runners-up: (1) 2023-24

== Season summaries ==
Since 1998–99 season
Season	League	Position	W	D	L	Pts	Notes	Captain
1998–99	Yorkshire 2	3rd	11	2	5	24		Tim Helliwell
1999–00	Yorkshire 2	4th	12	0	6	24		Jon Isherwood
2000–01	Yorkshire 3	7th	9	2	11	20		G A Pollard
2001–02	Yorkshire 3	7th	9	0	13	18		Tim Helliwell
2002–03	Yorkshire 3	12th	1	1	20	2	Relegated to Yorkshire 4	Jon Isherwood
2003–04	Yorkshire 4	11th	6	1	15	13	Relegated to Yorkshire 5 North West	B Holden
2004–05	Yorkshire 5 North West	1st	11	1	2	23	Champions, promoted to Yorkshire 4	Jon Isherwood
2005–06	Yorkshire 4	12th	1	0	21	2	Relegated to Yorkshire 5 North West	Damian Whiteley
2006–07	Yorkshire 5 North West	3rd	10	0	6	20		Rick Duffy
2007–08	Yorkshire 5A	1st	12	1	1	25	Promoted to Yorkshire 4	Andy Lyon
2007–08	Yorkshire 5C	2nd	7	0	1	16	Promoted to Yorkshire 4	Andy Lyon
2008–09	Yorkshire 4	5th	13	1	8	27	Promoted to Yorkshire Division Three	M Lockwood
2009–10	Yorkshire Division Three	8th	7	1	13	15		Paul Knapping
2010–11	Yorkshire Division Three	12th	4	1	17	23		Andrew Murray
2011–12	Yorkshire Division Three	14th	5	0	21	24	Relegated to Yorkshire Division Four	Andrew Murray
2012–13	Yorkshire Division Four	8th	9	0	13	42		Andrew Murray
2013–14	Yorkshire Division Four	5th	13	1	8	65		Paul Jowett
2014–15	Yorkshire Division Four	6th	12	1	9	58		Paul Jowett
2015–16	Yorkshire Division Four	1st	19	0	3	90	Promoted to Yorkshire Division Three	Paul Jowett
2016–17	Yorkshire Division Three	1st	20	1	5	95	Promoted to Yorkshire Division Two	Paul Jowett
2017–18	Yorkshire Division Two	14th	3	1	22	21	Relegated to Yorkshire Division Three	Paul Jowett
2018–19	Yorkshire Division Three	9th	9	0	17	45		Jamie Richardson
2019–20	Yorkshire Division Three	9th	11	1	10	61	Play was stopped on the 16/03/20 due to COVID-19	Tony Curtis
2020–21	Yorkshire Three	N/A	0	0	0	0	No games were played due to the Pandemic	Tony Curtis
2021–22	Yorkshire Three	6th	13	1	12	64		Paul Jowett
2022–23	Counties 3 Yorkshire	6th	11	0	11	51		Ben Burnside
2023–24	Counties 3 Yorkshire	2nd	20	0	2	96	Promoted to Counties 2 Yorkshire	Dan Mitchell
2024─25	Counties 2 Yorkshire	5th	13	1	8	67		Reuben Pollard

== Notable former players ==
=== Internationals ===
- Chris Davies, former England Sevens international also played for Cambridge University and Saracens,
- Jamie Bloem, former South Africa Rugby League captain as well as playing internationally for Scotland Rugby League. Bloem joined in 2013 as a player coach.
- Rehan Mansoor, 16 Cap Pakistan international joined Vandals as a player in 2022 and named forwards coach in 2023,
