= Ossett RUFC =

English rugby union club, based in Bingley, West Yorkshire

- Full name: Ossett Rugby Union Football Club
- Union: Yorkshire RFU
- Founded: 1931; 94 years ago
- Location: Ossett, West Yorkshire, England
- Ground(s): Queens Terrace
- Chairman: John Mosby
- President: Pete Bradshaw
- Coach(es): Simon Betty
- Captain(s): Jack Drury
- League(s): Yorkshire 2
- 2024-25: 7th
Team kit

Official website
- www.ossettrugby.co.uk

Ossett Rugby Union Football Club is an English rugby union team based in Ossett, Wakefield, West Yorkshire. The club runs three senior sides, including two men's teams, a women's team, and a range of mini and junior teams. The first XV plays in Counties 2 Yorkshire.

== History ==
=== Early years ===
The club has a long-standing history within Yorkshire rugby, with its origins dating back to the 1890s. During this early period, the original Ossett team won the Yorkshire Cup (rugby union), defeating Hebden Bridge 13–3. Among the players was Charles Wimpenny, who captained the team and went on to represent Yorkshire on six occasions, earning a County Cap.

Further success came in 1931 when Ossett claimed the Yorkshire Challenge Shield with a 6–0 victory over Keighlians. The club reached the final of the competition again the following year but were defeated by the Gloucestershire Regiment. Archival photographs and programmes of the Ossett rugby team date back to 1939.

=== Post-war revival ===
The onset of the Second World War led to the suspension of rugby activities in the town. Although there was a brief revival in 1946, it was not until 1979 that the club was formally re-established by a group of local rugby enthusiasts aiming to revive Ossett’s rugby tradition.

=== Modern era ===
In the 1992–93 season, Ossett reached the final of the Yorkshire Silver Trophy, becoming the first club to have appeared in the finals of all three Yorkshire Cup competitions. Despite losing the final to Aireborough, the team completed the season without defeat in any league fixtures.

Throughout its history, the club has relocated several times, playing on various pitches across the area. Its more recent homes have included Springmill and, later, Southdale. In 2021, Ossett Rugby Union Football Club relocated to the former Ossett Albion A.F.C. ground at Queen's Terrace. Today, the club continues to participate actively in regional competitions, fielding both experienced players and developing talent.

== Club honours ==
- Yorkshire 6 – Runners-up (promotion): 2003–04
- Yorkshire 5 South East – Runners-up: 2004–05
- Counties 4 Yorkshire South East - Champions: 2018–19
- Counties 3 Yorkshire - Runners-up (promotion): 2022–23

== Notable players ==
Sam Drury – Recorded 742 appearances for the club, the most in its history.
