= Counties 4 Yorkshire =

English Rugby Union league

- Current season or competition: 2022–23 Counties 4 Yorkshire
- Sport: Rugby union
- Instituted: 1987; 39 years ago
- Number of teams: 15; 7 (North-West Division); 7 (South-East Division)
- Country: England
- Holders: Bramley Phoenix (1st title) (2019–20) (promoted to Yorkshire 3)
- Most titles: Hessle, Hullensians, Old Rishworthians, Rotherham Phoenix, Stocksbridge, Wibsey (2 titles)
- Website: England RFU

Counties 4 Yorkshire is an English rugby union league at the tenth tier of the domestic competition for teams from Yorkshire. Club rugby in Yorkshire operates without promotion play-offs, meaning that the top two teams are automatically promoted to Yorkshire 3 and the bottom two teams were relegated to Yorkshire 5 until the RFU made changes to the Yorkshire league structure. Each season, a team from Counties 3 Yorkshire or Yorkshire 4 may be picked to take part in the RFU Junior Vase - a national competition for clubs at levels 9-12.

For the 2017-18 season, Yorkshire 4 was broken up into two regional leagues - Yorkshire 4 (North West) and Yorkshire 4 (South East) - while Yorkshire 5 ceased to exist. Teams from both Yorkshire 4 and 5 were transferred into the regional divisions depending on location. After the teams have played each other home and away, in February the clubs are reallocated into a Premier league and a Shield league for one further round of fixtures. The top four teams from each league play in the Premier and the other teams play in the Shield. The top two teams in the Premier league are promoted to Counties 3 Yorkshire.

== Participating clubs 2026-27 ==
Ahead of the new season, a decision was made to introduce 2XVs into the league(s), to dispense with the North / South designation and to split the clubs out into A and B & C divisions.

=== A Division ===
Departing were champions Nestle Rowntree and runners-up York Railway Institute, both promoted to Counties 3 Yorkshire A.

Wetherby II were initially placed in the league but were later reallocated to Counties 3 Yorkshire A.

Selby III were initially placed in the league but withdrew before the season began.

Team	Ground	Capacity	City/Area	Previous season
Harrogate Pythons II	The Jim Saynor Ground		Harrogate, North Yorkshire,	New entry
Hessle	Livingstone Road		Hessle, East Riding of Yorkshire	4th (South)
Hullensians II	Springhead Lane		Hull, East Riding of Yorkshire	New entry
Ilkley III	Stacks Field	2,000 (40 seats)	Ilkley, West Yorkshire	New entry
Knaresborough	Hay-A-Park Lane		Knaresborough, North Yorkshire	6th (North)
Richmondshire	Theakston Lane		Richmond, North Yorkshire	8th (North)
Ripon II	Mallorie Park		Ripon, North Yorkshire	New entry
Thirsk	Newsham Road		Thirsk, North Yorkshire	Relegated from Counties 3 Yorkshire (12th)
Wensleydale II	Cawkill Park		Leyburn, North Yorkshire	New entry
Whitby	Recreation Ground		Whitby, North Yorkshire	Moved from Counties 3 Durham & Northumberland (3rd)

Locations of the 2026-27 Counties 4 Yorkshire A teams

=== B Division ===
North Ribblesdale II and Yarnbury II were initially placed in the league but instead will compete in Counties 3 Yorkshire A and Counties 3 Yorkshire B respectively.

Team	Ground	Capacity	City/Area	Previous season
Aireborough	Nunroyd Park		Yeadon, West Yorkshire	7th (North)
Baildon II	Jenny Lane		Baildon, West Yorkshire	New entry
Cleckheaton II	Moorend		Cleckheaton, West Yorkshire	New entry
Huddersfield Laund Hill II	Laund Hill Stadium		Nettleton_Hill, Huddersfield, West Yorkshire	New entry
Keighley II	Rose Cottage		Keighley, West Yorkshire	New entry
Leeds Medics & Dentists	Weetwood Playing Fields		Weetwood, Leeds, West Yorkshire	5th (North)
Leeds Modernians	Cookridge Lane		Cookridge, Leeds, West Yorkshire	4th (North)
Leodiensian II	Crag Lane		Alwoodley, Leeds, West Yorkshire	New entry
Old Rishworthians II	Hollas Lane		Copley, Halifax, West Yorkshire	New entry
Roundhegians II	The Memorial Groun		Roundhay, Leeds, West Yorkshire	New entry

Locations of the 2026-27 Counties 4 Yorkshire B teams
Locations of the 2026-27 Counties 4 Yorkshire B teams in Leeds area

=== C Division ===
Departing were Maltby promoted to Counties 3 Yorkshire B

Doncaster Phoenix II were initially placed in the league but withdrew before the season began.

Sheffield Medicals (5th (South)) did not return for the new season.

Team	Ground	Capacity	City/Area	Previous season
Barton and District	Mill Lane		Barrow-upon-Humber, North Lincolnshire	New entry
Dinnington II	Lodge Lane		Dinnington, South Yorkshire, Sheffield	New entry
Goole II	Westfield Banks		Goole, East Riding of Yorkshire	New entry
Hallamshire	Northfield Road		Sheffield, South Yorkshire	3rd (South)
Maltby II	Muglet Lane		Maltby, South Yorkshire	
Sheffield III	Abbeydale Park	3,200 (100 seats)	Sheffield, South Yorkshire	New entry
Sheffield Oaks	Parson Cross Park		Parson Cross, Sheffield, South Yorkshire	Re-entry
Stocksbridge	Coal Pit Lane		Stocksbridge, South Yorkshire	2nd (South)
Thornensians	Coulman Road		Thorne, South Yorkshire	Relegated from Counties 3 Yorkshire
Wath-upon-Dearne III	Moor Road		Wath-upon-Dearne, South Yorkshire	New entry
Wheatley Hills II	Brunel Road		Doncaster, South Yorkshire	New entry
Wortley	Finkle Street Lane		Wortley, South Yorkshire	6th (South)

Locations of the 2026-27 Counties 4 Yorkshire C teams
Locations of the 2026-27 Counties 4 Yorkshire C teams in Sheffield area

== Participating clubs 2025-26 ==
=== North division ===
Departing were Hornsea, promoted to Counties 3 Yorkshire as champions.

Thirsk RUFC joined the league after getting relegated from Counties 3 Yorkshire last season.

Team	Ground	Capacity	City/Area	Previous season
Aireborough	Nunroyd Park		Yeadon, West Yorkshire	8th
Knaresborough	Hay-A-Park Lane		Knaresborough, North Yorkshire	4th
Leeds Medics & Dentists	Weetwood Playing Fields		Weetwood, Leeds, West Yorkshire	5th
Leeds Modernians	Cookridge Lane		Cookridge, Leeds, West Yorkshire	6th
Nestle Rowntree	Mille Crux		York, North Yorkshire	2nd
Richmondshire	Theakston Lane		Richmond, North Yorkshire	7th
Thirsk	Newsham Road		Thirsk, North Yorkshire	Relegated from Counties 3 Yorkshire (12th)
York Railway Institute	New Lane		York, North Yorkshire	3rd

Locations of the 2025-26 Counties 4 Yorkshire North teams

=== South division ===
Departing were Dearne Valley (champions) promoted to Counties 3 Yorkshire.

Knottingley (7th in 2024-25) and Withernsea (new entry) both started but subsequently withdrew from the league leaving six clubs to contest the outstanding fixtures.

Team	Ground	Capacity	City/Area	Previous season
Hallamshire	Northfield Road		Sheffield, South Yorkshire	New entry
Hessle	Livingstone Road		Hessle, East Riding of Yorkshire	5th
~~Knottingley~~	Howard's Field		Knottingley, West Yorkshire	7th
Maltby	Muglet Lane		Maltby, South Yorkshire	3rd
Sheffield Medicals	Norton Playing Fields		Norton, Sheffield, South Yorkshire	2nd
Stocksbridge	Coal Pit Lane		Stocksbridge, South Yorkshire	4th
~~Withernsea~~	Hollym		Withernsea, East Riding of Yorkshire	New entry
Wortley	Finkle Street Lane		Wortley, South Yorkshire	6th

Locations of the 2025-26 Counties 4 Yorkshire South teams

== Participating clubs 2024-25 ==
For the new season the league was once more split into North / South division as it had been most recently in season 2021-22. Three new teams, all from South Yorkshire, were added to the South league to make a total of seven, with eight competing in the North division.

Departing were Old Otliensians and Thornensians, promoted to Counties 3 Yorkshire as champions and runners-up respectively

Hornsea won the league on the final day of the season and doing so got promoted to Counties 3 Yorkshire for the 25/26 season.

=== North division ===
Team	Ground	Capacity	City/Area	Previous season
Aireborough	Nunroyd Park		Yeadon, West Yorkshire	5th
Hornsea	Hollis Recreation Ground		Hornsea, East Riding of Yorkshire	3rd
Knaresborough	Hay-A-Park Lane		Knaresborough, North Yorkshire	13th
Leeds Medics & Dentists	Weetwood Playing Fields		Weetwood, Leeds, West Yorkshire	7th
Leeds Modernians	Cookridge Lane		Cookridge, Leeds, West Yorkshire	9th
Nestle Rowntree	Mille Crux		York, North Yorkshire	4th
Richmondshire	Theakston Lane		Richmond, North Yorkshire	11th
York Railway Institute	New Lane		York, North Yorkshire	10th

Locations of the 2024–25 Counties 4 Yorkshire North teams

=== South division ===
Dearne Valley won the south division and join the Northern division winners Hornsea in Counties 3 Yorkshire for the 25/26 season

Team	Ground	Capacity	City/Area	Previous season
Dearne Valley	Vancouver Drive		Bolton upon Dearne, South Yorkshire	New entry
Hessle	Livingstone Road		Hessle, East Riding of Yorkshire	6th
Knottingley	Howard's Field		Knottingley, West Yorkshire	8th
Maltby	Muglet Lane		Maltby, South Yorkshire	New entry
Sheffield Medicals	Norton Playing Fields		Norton, Sheffield, South Yorkshire	Relegated from Counties 3 Yorkshire (12th)
Stocksbridge	Coal Pit Lane		Stocksbridge, South Yorkshire	12th
Wortley	Finkle Street Lane		Wortley, South Yorkshire	New entry

Locations of the 2024–25 Counties 4 Yorkshire South teams

== Participating clubs 2023-24 ==
Departing were Mosborough (4th in 2022-23) who moved on a level transfer to Counties 3 Midlands East (North). Joining were three sides relegated from Counties 3 Yorkshire together with Richmondshire who re-entered the Yorkshire Rugby leagues having most recently competed in Durham/Northumberland 3 for season 2021-22 during which they withdrew in January 2022.

Team	Ground	Capacity	City/Area	Previous season
Aireborough	Nunroyd Park		Yeadon, West Yorkshire	6th
Hessle	Livingstone Road		Hessle, East Riding of Yorkshire	10th
Hornsea	Hollis Recreation Ground		Hornsea, East Riding of Yorkshire	5th
Knaresborough	Hay-A-Park Lane		Knaresborough, North Yorkshire	12th
Knottingley	Howard's Field		Knottingley, West Yorkshire	Relegated from Counties 3 Yorkshire (11th)
Leeds Medics & Dentists	Weetwood Playing Fields		Weetwood, Leeds, West Yorkshire	Relegated from Counties 3 Yorkshire (12th)
Leeds Modernians	Cookridge Lane		Cookridge, Leeds, West Yorkshire	11th
Nestle Rowntree	Mille Crux		York, North Yorkshire	8th
Old Otliensians	Chaffers Field		Otley, West Yorkshire	3rd
Richmondshire	Theakston Lane		Richmond, North Yorkshire	Re-entry
Stocksbridge	Coal Pit Lane		Stocksbridge, South Yorkshire	7th
Thornensians	Coulman Road		Thorne, South Yorkshire	Relegated from Counties 3 Yorkshire (10th)
York Railway Institute	New Lane		York, North Yorkshire	9th

Locations of the 2023-24 Counties 4 Yorkshire teams

== Participating clubs 2022-23 ==
This was the first season following the RFU Adult Competition Review. The league was substantially similar to Yorkshire 4 albeit consolidated back into one having previously been split NW and SE. Eleven of the teams from season 2021-22 returned with two promoted to Counties 3 Yorkshire and two (Sheffield Oaks and Stanley Rodillians) withdrawing from the leagues. So with four departing but only one arriving the league was reduced from 15 teams to 12.

Team	Ground	Capacity	City/Area	Previous season
Aireborough	Nunroyd Park		Yeadon, West Yorkshire	7th (Yorks 4NW)
Hessle	Livingstone Road		Hessle, East Riding of Yorkshire	5th (Yorks 4SE)
Hornsea	Hollis Recreation Ground		Hornsea, East Riding of Yorkshire	2nd (Yorks 4SE) / 7th (Premier)
Halifax	Ovenden Park		Halifax, West Yorkshire	6th (Yorks 4NW)
Knaresborough	Hay-A-Park Lane		Knaresborough, North Yorkshire	8th (Yorks 4NW)
Leeds Modernians	Cookridge Lane		Cookridge, Leeds, West Yorkshire	5th (Yorks 4NW)
Mosborough	Mosborough Miners Welfare Club		Mosborough, Sheffield, South Yorkshire	3rd (Yorks 4SE) / 6th (Premier)
Nestle Rowntree	Mille Crux		York, North Yorkshire	3rd Yorks 4 NW / 3rd (Premier)
Old Otliensians	Chaffers Field		Otley, West Yorkshire	14th Yorkshire 3
Rotherham Phoenix	Herringthorpe Playing Fields		Clifton, Rotherham, South Yorkshire	1st (Yorks 4SE) / 4th Premier)
Stocksbridge	Coal Pit Lane		Stocksbridge, South Yorkshire	4th (Yorks 4SE) / 8th (Premier)
York Railway Institute	New Lane		York, North Yorkshire	4th (Yorks 4NW) / 5th (Premier)

Locations of the 2022–23 Counties 4 Yorkshire teams

== Participating clubs 2021-22 ==
The teams competing in 2021-22 achieved their places in the league based on performances in 2019-20, the 'previous season' column in the table below refers to that season not 2020-21.

=== North West division ===
York RI and Nestle Rowntree were level transferred from Yorkshire 4 South East for the current season.

Team	Ground	Capacity	City/Area	Previous season
Aireborough	Nunroyd Park		Yeadon, West Yorkshire	Relegated from Yorkshire 3 (14th)
Leeds Medics & Dentists	Weetwood Playing Fields		Weetwood, Leeds, West Yorkshire	5th (Yorks 4 NW) / 1st (Shield)
Leeds Modernians	Cookridge Lane		Cookridge, Leeds, West Yorkshire	3rd (Yorks 4 NW) / 6th (Premier)
Halifax	Ovenden Park		Halifax, West Yorkshire	4th (Yorks 4 NW) / 8th (Premier)
Knaresborough	Hay-A-Park Lane		Knaresborough, North Yorkshire	7th (Yorks 4 NW) / 6th (Shield)
Nestle Rowntree	Mille Crux		York, North Yorkshire	5th (Yorks 4 SE) / 2nd (Shield)
Thirsk	Thirsk Athletic Club		Thirsk, North Yorkshire	6th (Yorks 4 NW) / 4th (Shield)
York Railway Institute	New Lane		York, North Yorkshire	2nd (Yorks 4 SE) / 3rd (Premier)

Locations of the 2021–22 Yorkshire 4 (North West) teams

=== South East division ===
Team	Ground	Capacity	City/Area	Previous season
Hessle	Livingstone Road		Hessle, East Riding of Yorkshire	6th (Yorks 4 SE) / 3rd (Shield)
Hornsea	Hollis Recreation Ground		Hornsea, East Riding of Yorkshire	Promoted from Yorkshire RFU Eastern League 1 (runners-up)
Mosborough	Mosborough Miners Welfare Club		Mosborough, Sheffield, South Yorkshire	1st (Yorks 4 SE) / 4th (Premier)
Rotherham Phoenix	Herringthorpe Playing Fields		Clifton, Rotherham, South Yorkshire	Relegated from Yorkshire 3 (13th)
Sheffield Oaks	Parson Cross Park		Parson Cross, Sheffield, South Yorkshire	7th (Yorks 4 SE) / 5th (Shield)
Stanley Rodillians	Manley Park		Stanley, Wakefield, West Yorkshire	4th (Yorks 4 SE) / 5th (Premier)
Stocksbridge	Coal Pit Lane		Stocksbridge, South Yorkshire	3rd (Yorks 4 SE) / 7th (Premier)

Locations of the 2021–22 Yorkshire 4 (South East) teams

== Season 2020–21 ==
On 30 October 2020 the RFU announced that due to the coronavirus pandemic a decision had been taken to cancel Adult Competitive Leagues (National League 1 and below) for the 2020/21 season. This resulted in Yorkshire 4 not being contested.

== Participating clubs 2019-20 ==
=== North West division ===
Team	Ground	Capacity	City/Area	Previous season
Bramley Phoenix	Grosmont Terrace		Bramley, Leeds, West Yorkshire	6th (Premier)
Burley	Abbey		Hawksworth, Leeds, West Yorkshire	1st (Shield)
Leeds Medics & Dentists	Weetwood Playing Fields		Weetwood, Leeds, West Yorkshire	8th (Premier)
Leeds Modernians	Cookridge Lane		Cookridge, Leeds, West Yorkshire	Relegated from Yorkshire 3 (14th)
Halifax	Ovenden Park		Halifax, West Yorkshire	4th (Shield)
Knaresborough	Hay-A-Park Lane		Knaresborough, North Yorkshire	7th (Premier)
Thirsk	Thirsk Athletic Club		Thirsk, North Yorkshire	3rd (Shield)

Locations of the 2019-20 Yorkshire 4 (North West) teams in Leeds
Locations of the 2019–20 Yorkshire 4 (North West) teams

=== South East division ===
Team	Ground	Capacity	City/Area	Previous season
Hessle	Livingstone Road		Hessle, East Riding of Yorkshire	4th (Premier)
Mosborough	Mosborough Miners Welfare Club		Mosborough, Sheffield, South Yorkshire	5th (Premier)
Nestle Rowntree	Mille Crux		York, North Yorkshire	6th (Shield)
Sheffield Oaks	Parson Cross Park		Parson Cross, Sheffield, South Yorkshire	7th (Shield)
Stanley Rodillians	Manley Park		Stanley, Wakefield, West Yorkshire	5th (Shield)
Stocksbridge	Coal Pit Lane		Stocksbridge, South Yorkshire	2nd (Shield)
York Railway Institute	New Lane		York, North Yorkshire	3rd (Premier)

Locations of the 2019–20 Yorkshire 4 (South East) teams

=== Premier and Shield divisions ===
==== Premier participants ====
- Bramley Phoenix
- Burley
- Halifax
- Leeds Modernians
- Mosborough
- Stanley Rodillians
- Stocksbridge
- York Railway Institute

==== Shield participants ====
- Hessle
- Knaresborough
- Leeds Medics & Dentists
- Nestle Rowntree
- Sheffield Oaks
- Thirsk

== Participating clubs 2018-19 ==
=== North West division ===
Team	Ground	Capacity	City/Area	Previous season
Bramley Phoenix	Grosmont Terrace		Bramley, Leeds, West Yorkshire	1st (Shield)
Burley	Abbey		Leeds, West Yorkshire	5th (Premier)
Leeds Medics & Dentists	Weetwood Playing Fields		Weetwood, Leeds, West Yorkshire	Relegated from Yorkshire 3 (14th)
Halifax	Ovenden Park		Halifax, West Yorkshire	4th (Shield)
Knaresborough	Hay-A-Park Lane		Knaresborough, North Yorkshire	4th (Premier)
Thirsk	Thirsk Athletic Club		Thirsk, North Yorkshire	Runners up (Shield)
Wibsey	Northfield Road		Wibsey, Bradford, West Yorkshire	7th (Premier)

Locations of the 2018-19 Yorkshire 4 (North West) teams in Leeds
Locations of the 2018–19 Yorkshire 4 (North West) teams

=== South East division ===
Team	Ground	Capacity	City/Area	Previous season
Hessle	Livingstone Road		Hessle, East Riding of Yorkshire	3rd (Shield)
Mosborough	Mosborough Miners Welfare Club		Mosborough, Sheffield, South Yorkshire	3rd (Premier)
Nestle Rowntree	Mille Crux		York, North Yorkshire	Joined from Yorkshire Merit Leagues
Ossett	Ossett Cricket and Athletic Club		Ossett, West Yorkshire	6th (Premier)
Sheffield Oaks	Parson Cross Park		Parson Cross, Sheffield, South Yorkshire	6th (Shield)
Stanley Rodillians	Manley Park		Stanley, Wakefield, West Yorkshire	8th (Premier)
Stocksbridge	Coal Pit Lane		Stocksbridge, South Yorkshire	Relegated from Yorkshire 3 (13th)
York Railway Institute	New Lane		York, North Yorkshire	5th (Shield)

Locations of the 2018–19 Yorkshire 4 (South East) teams

=== Premier and Shield divisions ===
==== Premier participants ====
- Bramley Phoenix
- Hessle
- Knaresborough
- Leeds Medics & Dentisists
- Mosborough
- Ossett
- Wibsey
- York Railway Institute

==== Shield participants ====
- Burley
- Halifax
- Nestle Rowntree
- Sheffield Oaks
- Stanley Rodilians
- Stocksbridge
- Thirsk

== Participating clubs 2017-18 ==
=== North West division ===
Team	Ground	Capacity	City/Area	Previous season
Bramley Phoenix	Grosmont Terrace		Bramley, Leeds, West Yorkshire	Transferred from Yorkshire 4 (9th)
Burley	Abbey		Leeds, West Yorkshire	Transferred from Yorkshire 4 (4th)
Halifax	Ovenden Park		Halifax, West Yorkshire	Relegated from Yorkshire 3 (14th)
Knaresborough	Hay-A-Park Lane		Knaresborough, North Yorkshire	Transferred from Yorkshire 5 (3rd)
Leeds Corinthians	Nutty Slack		Middleton, Leeds, West Yorkshire	Transferred from Yorkshire 4 (5th)
Thirsk	Thirsk Athletic Club		Thirsk, North Yorkshire	Transferred from Yorkshire 5 (5th)
Wibsey	Northfield Road		Wibsey, Bradford, West Yorkshire	Transferred from Yorkshire 5 (champions)

Locations of the 2017–18 Yorkshire 4 (North West) teams

=== South East division ===
Team	Ground	Capacity	City/Area	Previous season
Hessle	Livingstone Road		Hessle, East Riding of Yorkshire	Transferred from Yorkshire 4 (6th)
Mosborough	Mosborough Miners Welfare Club		Mosborough, Sheffield, South Yorkshire	Transferred from Yorkshire 5 (2nd)
Ossett	Ossett Cricket and Athletic Club		Ossett, West Yorkshire	Transferred from Yorkshire 4 (8th)
Sheffield Oaks	Parson Cross Park		Parson Cross, Sheffield, South Yorkshire	Transferred from Yorkshire 5 (4th)
Stanley Rodillians	Manley Park		Stanley, Wakefield, West Yorkshire	Transferred from Yorkshire 4 (10th)
Rossington Hornets	Rossington Miners Welfare Club		Rossington, South Yorkshire	Transferred from Yorkshire 5 (8th)
Rotherham Phoenix	Herringthorpe Playing Fields		Clifton, Rotherham, South Yorkshire	Transferred from Yorkshire 4 (3rd)
York Railway Institute	New Lane		York, North Yorkshire	Transferred from Yorkshire 4 (7th)

Locations of the 2017–18 Yorkshire 4 (South East) teams

=== Premier and Shield divisions ===
In February, after the teams have played each other home and away, the clubs in both Yorkshire 4 leagues are reallocated into a Premier league and a Shield league for one further round of fixtures. The top four teams from each league play in the Premier and the other teams play in the Shield.

==== Premier participants ====
- Burley
- Knaresborough
- Leeds Corinthians
- Mosborough
- Ossett
- Rotherham Phoenix
- Stanley Rodillians
- Wibsey

==== Shield participants ====
- Bramley Phoenix
- Halifax
- Hessle
- Sheffield Oaks
- Thirsk
- York RI

Rossington Hornets did not participate in the Shield competition.

== Participating clubs 2016-17 ==
- Bramley Phoenix (relegated from Yorkshire 3)
- Burley
- Hemsworth
- Hessle
- Hornsea (promoted from Yorkshire 5)
- Leeds Corinthians
- Ossett
- Rotherham Clifton
- Rotherham Phoenix (relegated from Yorkshire 3)
- Skipton
- Stanley Rodillians (promoted from Yorkshire 5)
- York Railway Institute

== Participating clubs 2015-16 ==
- Burley (relegated from Yorkshire 3)
- Halifax Vandals
- Hemsworth (relegated from Yorkshire 3)
- Hessle (promoted from Yorkshire 5)
- Leeds Corinthians
- Mosborough
- Ossett
- Rotherham Clifton (promoted from Yorkshire 5)
- Sheffield Oaks
- Skipton
- Wensleydale
- York Railway Institute

== Participating clubs 2014-15 ==
- Halifax
- Halifax Vandals
- Hornsea
- Knaresborough (promoted from Yorkshire 5)
- Leeds Corinthians
- Mosborough
- Ossett
- Sheffield Oaks
- Skipton (relegated from Yorkshire 3)
- Wensleydale (promoted from Yorkshire 5)
- Wetherby
- York Railway Institute

== Participating clubs 2013-14 ==
- Halifax
- Halifax Vandals
- Hessle (relegated from Yorkshire 3)
- Hornsea
- Leeds Corinthians
- Mosborough
- Old Otliensians
- Ossett
- Sheffield Oaks (promoted from Yorkshire 5)
- Stocksbridge (promoted from Yorkshire 5)
- Wetherby
- York Railway Institute (relegated from Yorkshire 3)

== Participating clubs 2012–13 ==
- Halifax
- Halifax Vandals
- Harrogate Pythons
- Hornsea
- Knaresborough
- Leeds Corinthians
- Marist
- Mosborough
- Old Grovians
- Old Otliensians
- Ossett
- Wetherby

== Original teams ==
When league rugby began in 1987 this division contained the following teams:

- Burley
- Dinnington
- Hessle
- Hullensians
- Leeds YMCA
- Old Modernians
- Skipton
- West Leeds
- Wetherby
- Wibsey
- Yorkshire CW

== Yorkshire 4 ==
=== Yorkshire 4 (1987–1993) ===
The original Yorkshire 4 was a tier 12 league with promotion up to Yorkshire 3 and relegation down to Yorkshire 5.

Yorkshire 4
Season	No of Teams	Champions	Runners–up	Relegated Teams
1987–88	11	Wibsey	Old Modernians	Skipton, Burley
1988–89	11	Hessle	West Leeds	Wetherby, Yorkshire CW
1989–90	11	Bradford Salem	Sheffield Oaks	Phoenix Park
1990–91	11	Northallerton	Dinnington	Yorkshire CW
1991–92	11	Hullensians	Halifax Vandals (Note: League restructuring due to the cancellation of Yorkshire 6 ahead of the 1992–93 season, meant nine clubs were promoted into Yorkshire 3 including Airebronians, Wetherby, Baildon, Old Rishworthians, Leeds Corinthians, Burley and Heath.)	No relegation (Note: League restructuring due to the cancellation of Yorkshire 6 ahead of the 1992–93 season, meant no clubs were relegated and eight clubs (originally nine) would be promoted from Yorkshire 5.)
1992–93	13	Ossett	Leeds YMCA	Yorkshire CW
Green backgrounds are promotion places.

=== Yorkshire 4 (1993–2000) ===
The creation of National 5 North for the 1993–94 season meant that Yorkshire 4 dropped to become a tier 13 league. A further restructure at the end of the 1995–96 season, which included the cancellation of National 5 North and the addition of North East 3 at tier 9, saw Yorkshire 4 remain at tier 13.

Yorkshire 4
Season	No of Teams	Champions	Runners–up	Relegated Teams
1993–94	13	Phoenix Park	Skipton	No relegation
1994–95	13	Mosborough	Baildon	Knaresborough
1995–96	13	Stocksbridge	Hornsea (Note: 3rd place Hornsea were promoted instead of runners up Burley who were instead demoted to Yorkshire 5.)	Multiple teams (Note: Yorkshire league restructuring due to reintroduction of Yorkshire 6 ahead of the 1996–97 season saw ten clubs relegated from Yorkshire 4; New Earswick, Rawmarsh, Withernsea, Adwick le Street and De La Salle (Sheffield) were relegated into Yorkshire 6, while BP Chemicals, Garforth, Danum Phoenix, Rowntrees and Burley were relegated into Yorkshire 5.)
1996–97	9	York Railway Institute	Leeds Corinthians (Note: Stanley Rodillians were also promoted.)	No relegation (Note: No relegation due to cancellation of Yorkshire 6 ahead of the 1997–98 season.)
1997–98	9	Heath	Baildon	Knaresborough
1998–99	10	Old Rishworthians	Knottingley	Nestle Rowntree, Ossett, Garforth
1999–00	9	Old Modernians (Note: No promotion this season as division to increase from 9 to 11 teams for the following season.)	Mosborough	Marist, Hornsea, Rotherham Clifton
Green backgrounds are promotion places.

=== Yorkshire 4 (2000–present) ===
Northern league restructuring by the RFU at the end of the 1999-2000 season saw the cancellation of North East 1, North East 2 and North East 3 (tiers 7-9). This meant that Yorkshire 4 became a tier 10 league.

Yorkshire 4
Season	No of Teams	Champions	Runners–up	Relegated Teams
2000–01	11	Stocksbridge	Old Rishworthians	Edlington Granby, Thornensians
2001–02	12	Knottingley	Moortown	Mosborough, Stanley Rodillians, Old Rishworthians
2002–03	12	Roundhegians	Thornensians	Sheffield Medicals, Sheffield Oaks
2003–04	12	Barnsley	Baildon	Halifax Vandals, Hornsea, Wakefield Cougars
2004–05	11	Wath Upon Dearne	Old Modernians	Wetherby, Burley
2005–06	12	Aireborough	Doncaster Phoenix	Halifax Vandals, Stanley Rodillians, Hemsworth
2006–07	12	Hullensians	Castleford	Sheffield Oaks, Mosborough, Wetherby
2007–08	12	Hessle	Old Otliensians	Stocksbridge, Knaresborough, Hemsworth
2008–09	12	Old Rishworthians	Bramley Phoenix	Burley
2009–10	12	Rotherham Phoenix	York Railway Institute	Hornsea, Adwick Le Street
2010–11	12	Sheffield Medicals	Burley	Marist
2011–12	12	Leeds Medics & Dentists	Hemsworth	Stanley Rodillians
2012–13	12	Old Grovians	Harrogate Pythons	Knaresborough, Marist
2013–14	12	Old Otliensians	Stocksbridge	Hessle
2014–15	12	Wetherby	Halifax	Knaresborough, Hornsea
2015–16	12	Halifax Vandals	Wensleydale	Sheffield Oaks, Mosborough
2016–17	11	Hemsworth	Skipton	No relegation (Note: No relegation as Yorkshire 5 was abolished at the end of the 2016-17 season.)
2017–18	15	Rotherham Phoenix	Leeds Corinthians	No relegation
2018–19	15	Wibsey	Ossett	No relegation
2019–20	14	Bramley Phoenix	Burley	No relegation
2020–21	14			
Green backgrounds are promotion places.

== Number of league titles ==
- Hessle (2)
- Hullensians (2)
- Old Rishworthians (2)
- Rotherham Phoenix (2)
- Stocksbridge (2)
- Wibsey (2)
- Aireborough (1)
- Barnsley (1)
- Bradford Salem (1)
- Bramley Phoenix (1)
- Halifax Vandals (1)
- Heath (1)
- Hemsworth (1)
- Knottingley (1)
- Leeds Medics & Dentists (1)
- Mosborough (1)
- Northallerton (1)
- Old Grovians (1)
- Old Modernians (1)
- Old Otliensians (1)
- Ossett (1)
- Phoenix Park (1)
- Roundhegians (1)
- Sheffield Medicals (1)
- Wath Upon Dearne (1)
- Wetherby (1)
- York Railway Institute (1)
- Hornsea RUFC (1)
- Dearne Valley (1)

== See also ==
- Yorkshire RFU
- English rugby union system
- Rugby union in England
