= Harry Garnett =

England international rugby union player

- Full name: Harry Wharfedale Tennant Garnett
- Born: 16 September 1851 Otley, England
- Died: 27 April 1928 (aged 76) Wharfedale, England

Rugby union career
- Position: Forwards
Senior career
Years	Team	Apps	(Points)
- Bradford FC
- Yorkshire Wanderers
–	Yorkshire	22	
International career
Years	Team	Apps	(Points)
1877	England	1	(0)

Harry Wharfedale Tennant Garnett (16 September 1851 – 27 April 1928) was an English rugby union footballer who played in the 1870s, and rugby union administrator of the 1890s. He played at representative level for England, and Yorkshire (captain), and at club level for Bradford FC (captain), and Yorkshire Wanderers, as a forward, e.g. front row, lock, or back row. Prior to Tuesday 27 August 1895, Bradford FC was a rugby union club, it then became a rugby league club, and since 1907 it has been the association football (soccer) club Bradford Park Avenue.

== Background ==
Harry Garnett was born in Otley, West Riding of Yorkshire, and he died aged 76 in Wharfedale, West Riding of Yorkshire.

== Playing career ==
Harry Garnett refused to wear shin pads or stockings during matches.

=== International honours ===
Harry Garnett won a cap for England while at Bradford FC in 1877 against Scotland.

=== County honours ===
Harry Garnett won caps for Yorkshire while at Bradford FC.

== Personal life ==
Garnett married his wife Rebecca Mary Theresa (née Wardle) in 1880 in the Strand district.
