= Yorkshire 5 =

Former English Rugby Union league

- Current season or competition: 2016–17 Yorkshire 5
- Sport: Rugby union
- Instituted: 1987; 39 years ago
- Ceased: 2017; 9 years ago
- Number of teams: 8
- Country: England
- Holders: Wibsey (1st title) (2016–17) (promoted to Yorkshire 4)
- Most titles: Halifax Vandals, Knaresborough (3 titles)
- Website: England RFU

Yorkshire 5 was an English Rugby Union league at the eleventh tier of the domestic competition and was the basement league of club rugby in Yorkshire. This league was not always the bottom division as for a while there was a Yorkshire 6 but this league merged with Yorkshire 5. Also, for a short period, Yorkshire 5 was split into two parallel leagues based on geographical location. Promoted teams moved up to Yorkshire 4.

At the end of the 2016-17 season Yorkshire 5 was abolished due to RFU changes to the Yorkshire league structure. This restructuring would see Yorkshire 4 broken up into two regional leagues - Yorkshire 4 (North West) and Yorkshire 4 (South East) - with teams from both Yorkshire 4 and 5 transferred into these new leagues.

== Participating Clubs 2016-17 ==
- Garforth
- Knaresborough
- Mosborough (relegated from Yorkshire 4)
- Rossington Hornets
- Sheffield Oaks (relegated from Yorkshire 4)
- Thirsk
- Wibsey
- Withernsea

== Participating Clubs 2015-16 ==
- Garforth
- Hallamshire
- Hornsea (relegated from Yorkshire 4)
- Knaresborough (relegated from Yorkshire 4)
- Rossington Hornets
- Stanley Rodillians
- Thirsk
- Wibsey

== Participating Clubs 2014-15 ==
- Garforth
- Hallamshire
- Hessle (relegated from Yorkshire 4)
- Rossington Hornets
- Rotherham Clifton
- Stanley Rodillians
- Thirsk
- Wibsey

== Participating Clubs 2013–14 ==
- Garforth
- Hallamshire
- Knaresborough - (relegated from Yorkshire 4)
- Marist - (relegated from Yorkshire 4)
- Rossington Hornets
- Rotherham Clifton
- Stanley Rodillians
- Thirsk
- Wensleydale
- Wibsey

== Participating Clubs 2012–13 ==
- Adwick Le Street
- Doncaster Amateurs
- Garforth
- Rawmarsh
- Rossington Hornets
- Rotherham Clifton
- Sheffield Oaks
- Stanley Rodillians
- Stocksbridge
- Wensleydale
- Wibsey

== Clubs joining the League ==
As this is currently the basement league of club rugby in Yorkshire, any club wishing to join the rugby union club hierarchy must begin at the bottom so all Yorkshire-based teams start in Yorkshire 5 and these are the clubs who have been accepted into the league structure for the first time.

- 2012-13: Doncaster Amateurs
- 2013-14: Hallamshire, Thirsk
- 2016-17: Withernsea

== Original teams ==
When league rugby began in 1987 this division contained the following teams:

- BP Chemicals
- Halifax Vandals
- Hornsea
- Knaresborough
- Leeds Corinthians
- Old Rishworthians
- Ossett
- Phoenix Park
- Rowntrees
- Withernsea
- Yorkshire Main

== Yorkshire 5 Honours ==
=== Yorkshire 5 (1987–1993) ===
The original Yorkshire 5 was a tier 13 league with promotion up to Yorkshire 4 and relegation down to Yorkshire 6 until that division was cancelled at the end of the 1991–92 season.

Yorkshire 5 Honours
Season	No of Teams	Champions	Runners–up	Relegated Teams
1987–88	11	Halifax Vandals	Old Rishworthians	Knaresborough, Withernsea
1988–89	11	Sheffield Oaks	Phoenix Park	Hornsea, Leeds Corinthians
1989–90	11	Wetherby	Ossett	Rowntrees
1990–91	11	Burley	Leeds Corinthians	Knaresborough (Note: Relegated side Knaresborough would transfer to Durham/Northumberland 4 for the following season instead of dropping to Yorkshire 6.)
1991–92	11	Skipton	Danum Phoenix (Note: League restructuring due to the cancellation of Yorkshire 6 ahead of the 1992–93 season, meant eight clubs were promoted into Yorkshire 4 including Hornsea, De La Salle (Sheffield), Withernsea, Phoenix Park, BP Chemicals and Yorkshire Main. Hull & East Riding were also meant to be promoted but they merged with Old Hymerians to form Hull RUFC who would play in North 2 East.)	No relegation (Note: League restructuring due to the cancellation of Yorkshire 6 ahead of the 1992–93 season, meant no clubs were relegated.)
1992–93	13	Knaresborough	Rowntrees	No relegation
Green backgrounds are promotion places.

=== Yorkshire 5 (1993–2000) ===
The creation of National 5 North for the 1993–94 season meant that Yorkshire 5 dropped to become a tier 14 league. A further restructure at the end of the 1995–96 season, which included the cancellation of National 5 North and the addition of North East 3 at tier 9, saw Yorkshire 5 remain at tier 14. During this period Yorkshire 6 (and relegation) was re-introduced in 1996-97, cancelled, and then re-introduced for the third time for the 1999–00 season.

Yorkshire 5 Honours
Season	No of Teams	Champions	Runners–up	Relegated Teams
1993–94	10	Garforth	Stocksbridge	No relegation
1994–95	6	Rawmarsh	North Earswick	No relegation
1995–96	9	Knaresborough	Padsey	Menwith Hill
1996–97	9	Marist	Eddington & Wick (Note: Runners up Eddington & Wick were supposed to be promoted to Yorkshire 4 but would instead drop out of the league system at the end of the season.)	No relegation
1997–98	9	Ossett	Ossett	No relegation
1998–99	8	Rotherham Clifton	Edlington Granby	Withernsea, Rawmarsh, Wickersley Exel, Adwick Le Street (Note: The reintroduction of Yorkshire 6 would see multiple teams relegated to populate the new division.)
1999–00	5	Wakefield Cougars (Note: No promotion as division to increase from 5 to 10 teams for the following season.)	Ossett	Nestle Rowntree, Garforth, Knaresborough
Green backgrounds are promotion places.

=== Yorkshire 5 (2000–2004) ===
Northern league restructuring by the RFU at the end of the 1999-2000 season saw the cancellation of North East 1, North East 2 and North East 3 (tiers 7-9). This meant that Yorkshire 5 became a tier 11 league. Relegation continued to Yorkshire 6 until that division was abolished ahead of the 2003–04 season.

Yorkshire 5 Honours
Season	No of Teams	Champions	Runners–up	Relegated Teams
2000–01	10	Wakefield Cougars	Doncaster Phoenix	Wickersley Exel
2001–02	10	Sheffield Medicals	Thornensians	Rotherham Clifton, Rawmarsh, Marist
2002–03	10	Stanley Rodillians	Hornsea	Ossett, Wibsey
2003–04	10	Sheffield Oaks	Burley	No relegation (Note: No relegation as Yorkshire 6 to be cancelled at the end of the season - it would re-emerge briefly in 2009-10 for one season only.)
Green backgrounds are promotion places.

=== Yorkshire 5 North-East / South East (2004–2007) ===
For the 2004–05 season Yorkshire 5 was divided into two regional divisions - Yorkshire 5 North-West and Yorkshire 5 South East.

Yorkshire 5 Honours
Season	No of Teams	Champions	Runners–up	Relegated Teams	League Name
2004–05	8	Halifax Vandals	Aireborough	No relegation	Yorkshire 5 North-West
2004–05	8	Hornsea	Ossett	No relegation	Yorkshire 5 South-East
2005–06	8	Knaresborough	Wetherby	No relegation	Yorkshire 5 North-West
2005–06	8	Mosborough	Pontefract Pythons	No relegation	Yorkshire 5 South-East
2006–07	9	Burley	Garforth	No relegation	Yorkshire 5 North-West
2006–07	7	Hemsworth	Sheffield Medicals	No relegation	Yorkshire 5 South-East
Green backgrounds are promotion places.

=== Yorkshire 5A / 5B (2007–2009) ===
For the 2007-08 season Yorkshire 5 switched from regional divisions into conferences - Yorkshire 5A and Yorkshire 5B. Relegation returned with the reintroduction of Yorkshire 6 (for the fourth time) ahead of the 2009–10 season.

Yorkshire 5 Honours
Season	No of Teams	Champions	Runners–up	Relegated Teams	League Name
2007–08	8	Halifax Vandals	Sheffield Medicals	No relegation	Yorkshire 5A
2007–08	8	Old Rishworthians	Rotherham Phoenix	No relegation	Yorkshire 5B
2008–09	9	Sheffield Medicals	Hemsworth (Note: Four clubs promoted including Ossett and Harrogate Pythons due to league restructure - Yorkshire 6 to be reinstated and Yorkshire 5 to merge back into a single division.)	Sheffield Oaks	Yorkshire 5A
2008–09	9	Leeds Medics & Dentists	Old Grovians (Note: 3rd place Adwick Le Street also promoted due to league restructure - Yorkshire 6 to be reinstated and Yorkshire 5 to merge back into a single division.)	Leeds Metropolitan University, (Note: Leeds Metropolitan University would drop out of the league for the following season.) Wetherby, Rossington Hornets	Yorkshire 5B
Green backgrounds are promotion places.

=== Yorkshire 5 (2009–2017) ===
Yorkshire 5 once more returned to being a single division from the 2009-10 season onward. The cancellation of Yorkshire 6 after just one season meant that there was no relegation. At the end of the 2016–17 season Yorkshire 5 was cancelled.

Yorkshire 5 Honours
Season	No of Teams	Champions	Runners–up	Relegated Teams
2009–10	7	Mosborough	Marist (Note: 3rd place Stanley Rodillians also promoted.)	No relegation (Note: No relegation as Yorkshire 6 cancelled after just one season.)
2010–11	12	Wetherby	Knaresborough	No relegation
2011–12	10	Hornsea	Marist	No relegation
2012–13	9	Doncaster Amateurs	Stocksbridge (Note: 3rd place Sheffield Oaks also promoted.)	No relegation
2013–14	9	Wensleydale	Knaresborough	No relegation
2014–15	8	Hessle	Rotherham Clifton	No relegation
2015–16	7	Stanley Rodillians	Hornsea	No relegation
2016–17	8	Wibsey	Mosborough	No relegation
Green backgrounds are promotion places.

== Promotion play-offs ==
Between 2005 and 2007 there was a play-off between the runners-up of Yorkshire 5 North-West and Yorkshire 5 South-West for the third and final promotion place to Yorkshire 4. The team with the superior league record has home advantage in the tie. At the end of the 2016–17 season Yorkshire 5 North-West have been the most successful winning all three games; and the away team has won promotion on two occasions compared to the home teams one.

For the 2007-08 season Yorkshire 5 was re-organized into non-geographical groups named Yorkshire 5A and Yorkshire 5B, with Yorkshire 5B being the most successful by winning the only playoff game played. After the 2008-09 season Yorkshire 5 returned to a single division meaning that there have been no more play-offs since.

Yorkshire 5A v Yorkshire 5B promotion play-off results
Season	Home team	Score	Away team	Venue	Attendance
2004–05	Ossett	6-30	Aireborough (NW)	Ossett Cricket and Athletic Club, Ossett, West Yorkshire	
2005–06	Wetherby (NW)	64-3	Pontefract Pythons (SE)	Grange Park, Wetherby, West Yorkshire	
2006–07	Sheffield Medicals (SE)	10-13	Garforth (NW)	Norton Playing Fields, Norton, Sheffield, South Yorkshire	
2007–08	Rotherham Phoenix (B)	15-10	Sheffield Medicals (A)	Clifton Lane, Rotherham, South Yorkshire	
Green background is the promoted team. NW = Yorkshire 5 North-West, SE = Yorkshire 5 South-East, A = Yorkshire 5A and B = Yorkshire 5B

== Number of league titles ==
- Halifax Vandals (3)
- Knaresborough (3)
- Burley (2)
- Hornsea (2)
- Mosborough (2)
- Sheffield Medicals (2)
- Sheffield Oaks (2)
- Stanley Rodillians (2)
- Wakefield Cougars (2)
- Wetherby (2)
- Doncaster Amateurs (1)
- Garforth (1)
- Hemsworth (1)
- Hessle (1)
- Leeds Medics & Dentists (1)
- Marist (1)
- Old Rishworthians (1)
- Ossett (1)
- Rawmarsh (1)
- Rotherham Clifton (1)
- Skipton (1)
- Wensleydale (1)
- Wibsey (1)

== See also ==
- Yorkshire RFU
- English rugby union system
- Rugby union in England
