= Jamie Bloem =

Former Scotland & South Africa international rugby league footballer and referee

Personal information
- Full name: Jamie Bloem
- Born: 26 May 1971 (age 55) Melbourne, Victoria, Australia
- Education: University of Cape Town
- Occupation: Landscaper

Rugby union career
- Position: Utility back
Youth career
- 1990-1991: Western Province
Senior career
Years	Team	Apps	(Points)
1990-1992	Union Milnerton RFC		
1999	Racing 92		
2002-2004	Halifax RUFC	36	(90)
2005-2006	Thornensians RUFC		
2006-2007	Old Brodleians RUFC		
2007-2011	Old Rishworthians RUFC		
2013-2018	Halifax Vandals RUFC		
2023	Heath Hawks		
- Correct as of 24 February 2024
Coaching career
- Years: Team
- 2005-2006: Thornensians RUFC (player-coach)
- 2006-2007: Old Brodleians RUFC (player-coach)
- 2007-2011: Old Rishworthians RUFC (player-coach)
- 2011-2013: Stainland Stags ARLFC (player-coach)
- 2013-2018: Halifax Vandals RUFC (player-coach)
- 2019-2020: Huddersfield YM RUFC (Head coach)
- 2019-2022: Greetland All-rounders ARLFC (Head coach)
- 2022-2023: Halifax RUFC (Head coach)
- 2023-: Elland RLFC (Head coach)
- Correct as of 24 February 2024
Refereeing career
Years	Competition		Apps
2010	Nordic Cup		1
2013-2016	Challenge Cup		5
- Correct as of 24 February 2024

Sport
- Rugby league career

Playing information
- Position: Halfback, Second-row, Centre, Fullback
Club
Years	Team	Pld	T	G	FG	P
1990	Cape Town Coasters
1992	Castleford Tigers	1				4
1993	Oldham RLFC	12				8
1993–1994	Doncaster	44				76
1997–1998	Widness Vikings	39				171
1998–2002	Halifax Panthers	108				336
2003	Huddersfield Giants	22				34
2004–2005	Halifax Panthers	51				359
2011–2013	Stainland Stags ARLFC
	Total	277	0	0	0	988
Representative
Years	Team	Pld	T	G	FG	P
1992–2000	South Africa	14				31
2004	Scotland	2				4

Jamie Bloem (born 26 May 1971) is a former dual code rugby player and rugby league referee. He currently coaches amateur rugby league side Elland ARLFC. He played representative rugby league for South Africa and Scotland. At club level for Cape Town Coasters (South Africa), Castleford Tigers, Oldham, Doncaster, Widnes Vikings,Halifax Panthers, Huddersfield Giants and player-coach for Stainland Stags ARLFC, as a fullback, wing, centre, scrum-half, second-row, or loose forward.

In rugby union he played for Western Province at representative level, and at club level for Union Milnerton RFC (Cape Town), Racing Métro 92, Halifax RUFC and player-coach for Thornensians RUFC, Old Brodleians RUFC, Old Rishworthians RUFC, and Halifax Vandals RUFC.

== Rugby league ==
=== Club career ===
Bloem initially played his club rugby league for the Cape Town Coasters in South Africa, he also played in France and has travelled extensively as a player, he became player-coach at Stainland Stags ARLFC (Halifax, West Yorkshire) during the Pennine League 2010–11 season.

=== Drugs ban ===
In November 1994, Bloem was the first rugby league player to test positive for performance enhancing anabolic steroid nandrolone, he was banned for two years.

=== Representative career ===
Bloem was the captain of South Africa (RL) during the 2000 World Cup, he was eligible for Scotland (RL) through his mother's nationality.

== Rugby union ==
Bloem has also had spells with rugby union sides; Halifax RUFC, Thornensians RUFC (Thorne, Doncaster), and Old Brodleians RUFC (Hipperholme, Halifax, West Yorkshire), whom he took to their first promotion in 75 years, he transferred to Old Rishworthians RUFC (Rishworth, Halifax, West Yorkshire) as player-coach for the 2007–08 season, he was the top point scorer for Old Rishworthians in 2007–08, breaking the club record with 375 points in the season, he became player-coach at Halifax Vandals RUFC at the start of the 2013–2014 season.

== Later years ==
Bloem became a BBC radio rugby league sports summariser, and a rugby league referee and controlled the Nordic Cup match between Norway and Sweden at Partille Ground (Spartacus Rugby Club), Gothenburg on Saturday 30 October 2010.

== Personal life ==
Bloem was born in Melbourne, Victoria, Australia to Scottish and South African parents, his twin sister died at the age of six weeks. He was brought up in apartheid-torn South Africa on a military base where his father was stationed. Bloems father died in action when he was 15.

After retiring from rugby Bloem set up a landscape gardening business in Halifax, West Yorkshire.

Bloem was wrongly accused of having sex with a minor, the charge was found to be completely without foundation.
