= Nettleton Hill =

Hamlet in West Yorkshire, England

Coordinates: 53.6488°N 1.8626°W

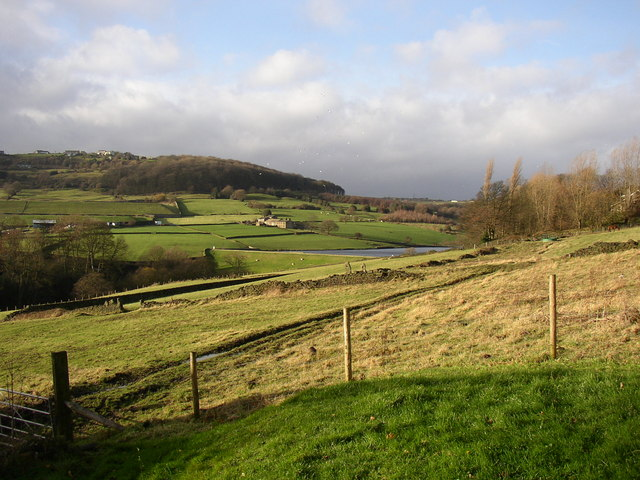
- Longwood Valley with Nettleton Hill at the left

- Location within West Yorkshire
- Metropolitan borough: Kirklees
- Metropolitan county: West Yorkshire
- Region: Yorkshire and the Humber
- Country: England
- Sovereign state: United Kingdom
- Police: West Yorkshire
- Fire: West Yorkshire
- Ambulance: Yorkshire

Nettleton Hill is a hamlet in the Kirklees district in the county of West Yorkshire, England. It is situated west of the town of Huddersfield, north of Scapegoat Hill and south of Pighill Wood. Longwood reservoir is to the east of the settlement. Nettleton Hill is part of the Golcar ward and of the HD7 postcode district.

The Colne Valley Trail passes through Nettleton Hill.

== See also ==
- Listed buildings in Colne Valley (eastern area)
