= Andy Rock =

English rugby union player

Andrew David Rock (born 11 November 1985 (age 40) in Keighley, West Yorkshire) is an English former rugby union player for Leeds Tykes. His usual position was at centre...

Rock made his first appearance for Leeds Tykes in the English Premiership in 2006, staying with the club until 2008 having made ten club appearances.

Following his playing career, he went on to become a coach at the same club, and had developed a track record of developing a number of very good young players from across Yorkshire within the Leeds Carnegie Academy. When Leeds Carnegie changed names and became Yorkshire Carnegie in 2014 he changed roles within the club and became the Academy Director at the club.

Whilst studying at Leeds Metropolitan University, he was presented with an award for Outstanding Academic Achievement by the prestigious Carnegie Faculty.

Rock became the Academy Director at Bath Rugby Club in August 2016.
