= Yorkshire 6 =

Former English Rugby Union league

- Sport: Rugby union
- Instituted: 1987; 39 years ago
- Ceased: 2010; 16 years ago
- Country: England
- Website: clubs.rfu.com

Yorkshire 6 was an English Rugby Union league which existed for a short period in the 2000s and throughout its existence it was the basement league of club rugby in Yorkshire. It was merged with Yorkshire 5 towards the end of the 2000s and the teams which would have been promoted into Yorkshire 5 that season were elevated to Yorkshire 4. At this point Yorkshire 5 became the basement league of Yorkshire club rugby.

== Original teams ==
When league rugby began in 1987 this division contained the following teams:

- Adwick-le-Street
- Armthorpe
- Bridon
- De La Salle (Sheffield)
- Granville College
- Maltby Old Boys
- Markham
- Sheffield Medicals
- Sheffield Oaks
- Sheffield Steels
- Stocksbridge

== Yorkshire 6 Honours ==
=== Yorkshire 6 (1987–1992) ===
The original Yorkshire 6 was a tier 14 league with promotion up to Yorkshire 5. As the lowest ranked division in the Yorkshire leagues there was no relegation. At the end of the 1991–92 season the division was cancelled after five seasons.

Yorkshire 6 Honours
Season	No of Teams	Champions	Runners–up	Relegated Teams
1987–88	11	Sheffield Oaks	Bridon (Note: Runners up Bridon would not be promoted to Yorkshire 5 as they would instead drop out of the Yorkshire league system.)	No relegation
1988–89	9	Castle Colliery	Knaresborough	No relegation
1989–90	11	De La Salle (Sheffield)	Withernsea	No relegation
1990–91	7	Hornsea	Hull & East Riding	No relegation
1991–92	6	Mosborough	Rowntrees (Note: The cancellation of Yorkshire 6 at the end of the season meant that all six clubs would be promoted into Yorkshire 5 including Adwick-le-Street, Stockbridge, Rawmarsh and New Earswick.)	No relegation
Green backgrounds are promotion places.

=== Yorkshire 6 (1996-1997) ===
Yorkshire 6 was re-introduced in 1996–97 and due to National 5 North became a tier 15 league. It only lasted one season before it was cancelled again.

Yorkshire 6 Honours
Season	No of Teams	Champions	Runners–up	Relegated Teams
1996–97	7	Adwick-le-Street	De La Salle (Sheffield) (Note: The cancellation of Yorkshire 6 at the end of the season meant that five clubs would be promoted into Yorkshire 5 including [, Rawmarsh, Withernsea and Leeds Medics & Dentists. New Earswick and Menwith Hill would drop out at the end of the season.)	No relegation
Green backgrounds are promotion places.

=== Yorkshire 6 (2000–2004) ===
Yorkshire 6 was re-introduced for the third time ahead of the 1999–00 season as a tier 15 league. The cancellation of North East 1, North East 2 and North East 3 (tiers 7–9) as part of Northern league restructuring by the RFU at the end of 1999–00 meant that Yorkshire 6 became a tier 11 league. After five seasons the division was cancelled once again at the end of the 2003–04 season.

Yorkshire 6 Honours
Season	No of Teams	Champions	Runners–up	Relegated Teams
1999–00	6	Doncaster Phoenix	Sheffield Medicals (Note: The expansion of Yorkshire 5 from 5 teams to 10 for the following season, meant that four clubs including Adwick Le Street and Wickersley Exel were promoted.)	No relegation
2000–01	8	Rawmarsh	Wharfedale Rams	No relegation
2001–02	9	Knaresborough	Wibsey	No relegation
2002–03	9	Burley	Pontefract Pythons	No relegation
2003–04	6	Wibsey	Ossett (Note: All teams in the division promoted to Yorkshire 5 as Yorkshire 6 would be cancelled for the following season and would not return until 2009-10.)	No relegation
Green backgrounds are promotion places.

=== Yorkshire 6 (2009–2010) ===
Yorkshire 6 returned for the fourth time ahead of the 2009–10 as a tier 11, lasting a single season before being cancelled yet again.

Yorkshire 6 Honours
Season	No of Teams	Champions	Runners–up	Relegated Teams
2009–10	5	Halifax	Rawmarsh (Note: All five teams in the division promoted to Yorkshire 5 as Yorkshire 6 would be cancelled for the following season.)	No relegation
Green backgrounds are promotion places.

== Number of league titles ==
- Adwick-le-Street (1)
- Burley (1)
- Castle Colliery (1)
- De La Salle (Sheffield) (1)
- Doncaster Phoenix (1)
- Halifax (1)
- Hornsea (1)
- Knaresborough (1)
- Mosborough (1)
- Rawmarsh (1)
- Sheffield Oaks (1)
- Wibsey (1)

== See also ==
- English Rugby Union Leagues
- English rugby union system
- Rugby union in England
