= Gertrude C. Bussey =

American philosopher and activist

Gertrude Bussey
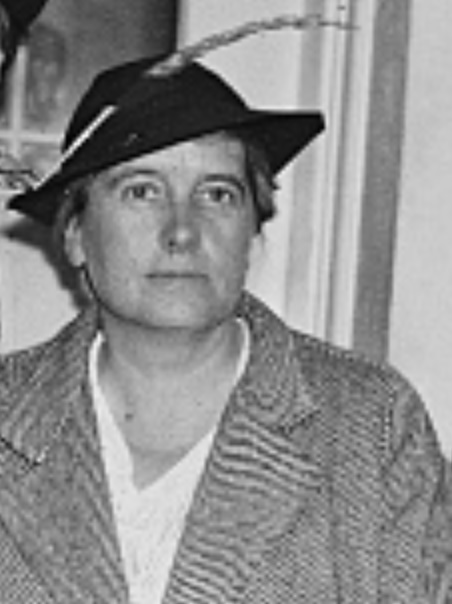
- Gertrude Bussey (1936)
- Born: Gertrude Carman Bussey; January 13, 1888
- Died: March 12, 1961 (aged 73)
- Education: Barnard College, Wellesley College, Columbia University, Oxford University, Northwestern University
- Occupations: Philosopher, Educator
- Known for: Activism for women's rights, civil liberties, and peace

Gertrude Carman Bussey (January 13, 1888 – March 12, 1961) was an American academic philosopher and activist for women's rights, civil liberties, and peace.

== Education and academic career ==
Gertrude Bussey, the daughter of Grace Fletcher Bussey and lawyer William George Bussey, was privately educated at several New York preparatory schools.

Bussey first attended Barnard College before graduating with a Bachelor of Arts in 1908 from Wellesley College. After graduate study at Columbia University in 1908-1909 and teaching at a private school in Bronxville she went on to do further study at Oxford University during 1912-14. She then went to Northwestern University and became, in 1915, its first student to receive a PhD in philosophy. That same year, she was appointed as an instructor of philosophy at Goucher College. She was promoted to full professor in 1921, and became chair of the philosophy department in 1924, a position she held until her retirement in 1953. In 1954, she received an honorary Doctor of Humane Letters (LHD) from the college.

In 1912, the Open Court Publishing Company produced a French/English version of Man a Machine by Julien Offray de La Mettrie that was founded on Bussey's translation (revised by Mary Whiton Calkins with the help of M. Carret and George Santayana) and included historical and philosophical notes that were condensed and adapted from a thesis on La Mettrie presented by Bussey to Wellesley College. It was reprinted in 1927 and 1943. This was the only available English translation of La Mettrie made since 1750 and no newer English translation was made available until 1994. Her PhD dissertation, Typical Recent Conceptions of Freedom, of which several chapters were previously published in The Philosophical Review and The Monist, was published in 1917. In the same she discusses various then contemporary naturalistic conceptions of freedom and determinism related to the issue of free will including those of Ernst Haeckel, William James, Henri Bergson and Bernard Bosanquet. Bussey's later articles were concerned with religion.

== Activism ==
Bussey "demonstrated throughout her life a concern for economic and social justice, peace, and above all, freedom" and was involved with numerous progressive social and political causes. She was, along with Elisabeth Gilman, a co-founder and leader of the Maryland Civil Liberties Committee, which was formed in 1921 in the wake of arrests and deportations of immigrant workers and was later to become a branch of the American Civil Liberties Union. She was also involved with the Baltimore Open Forum, the Consumers' League of Maryland, the Baltimore YMCA, and the Church League for Industrial Democracy.

Bussey was however "most completely identified with the Women's International League for Peace and Freedom" (WILPF). She was an original member of WILPF's Baltimore branch and was to serve as its Chairperson. On behalf of WILPF she traveled the Midwest giving lectures about the link between education and war and peace.

At a 1935 lecture in Hagerstown, Maryland, Bussey declared "We must strive to solve the economic and political problems which drive modern countries into war," and that "the world is now engaged in a race between education and death," clarifying, as Eric L. Hamilton put it, "that the solution to war was education and that permanent peace could only be achieved when people had the proper knowledge to see alternatives to war".

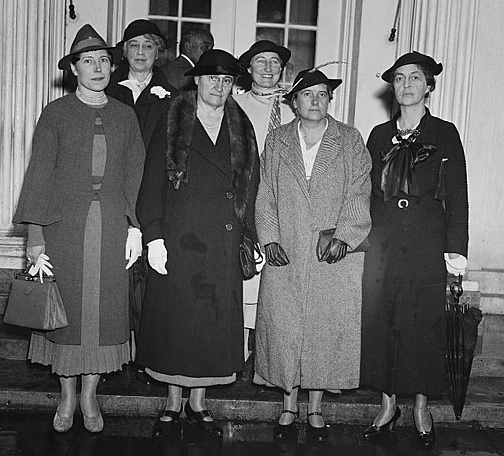
"Peace issues discussed with president, Washington, D.C. Sept. 30. Delegation from the Women's International League for Peace and Freedom leaving the White House today after discussing peace issues with President Roosevelt. The women plan to campaign during the month of October. In the group, left to right: (front) Miss Dorothy Detzer, recently returned from the world Peace Congress in Brussels; Mrs. Hannah Clothier Hull, President of the League; Dr. Gertrude C. Bussey, of Goucher College; Mrs. Ernest Gruening. Back row, left to right: Mrs. Frank Aydelotte, of Swarthmore, Pa., and Mrs. Mildred S. Olmstead, who just made an expensive trip through the West and Middle West speaking on the need for peace."

On September 30, 1936, she was a member of a WILPF delegation that discussed peace issues with President Roosevelt at the White House. Bussey served as National President of WILPF from May 1939 but as she did not always endorse strict pacifism she resigned her position in 1941 "so a more appropriate leader could take over." Her feeling being that "a forthright pacifist" should hold that position, She did however remain active within WILPF and was elected to the international executive committee as a joint chair in 1946. She also served as Honorary National President from 1960 to 1961.

Bussey died before she could complete her projected 50-year history on the WILPF. It was, however, completed by Margaret Tims and published posthumously as Women's International League for Peace and Freedom, 1915-1965: A Record of Fifty Years Work'(1965). In 1980, the monograph was reissued by Aiden Press with the title Pioneers for Peace: Women's International League for Peace and Freedom 1915-1965.

In a review prompted by this reissue Francis Early described it as "an important, indeed a crucial book, for anyone interested in the history of the women's peace movement". Early claimed that its authors represented "the best of the tradition of activist-scholars" and had produced a study that "is carefully researched, well written, and imbued with insights gained from first-hand knowledge of events and people".

== Legacy ==
Following Bussey's death on March 13, 1961, aged 73, which was marked by an obituary in The New York Times, a lectureship was founded in her honor at Goucher College "by the American Civil Liberties Union, the class of 1929 of Goucher, of which she was an honorary member, and the Women's International League for Peace and Freedom".

The Bussey Society at Northwestern University also host an annual public lecture by a distinguished female philosopher known as the 'Gertrude Bussey Lecture'.

== Works ==
- Typical Recent Conceptions of Freedom 1917, Press of T. Morey & son, Greenfield, Mass.
- trans, Man a Machine, by Julien Offroy de la Mende Open Court Publishing Co., Chicago. 1912
- "Dr. Bosanquet's Doctrine of Freedom" The Philosophical Review 25 (1916): 711-19, 728-30.
- "Criticisms and Discussions: Mechanism and the Problem of Freedom" The Monist Vol. 27, No. 2 (APRIL, 1917), pp. 295-306 (followed by a response from Paul Carus).
- "Thought, Existence, and Reality, as Viewed by F. H. Bradley and Bernard Bosanquet by Walter S. Gamertsfelde"The Philosophical Review, Vol. 30, No. 2 (Mar., 1921), pp. 210-213.
- "Anticipations of Kant's Refutation of Sensationalism", The Philosophical Review, Vol 31 (Nov.,1922), pp.564-580.
- "Croce's Theory of Freedom", [discussion with Marion Delia Crane] The Philosophical Review 39 (1930): 1-16.
- "Religion and Truth" Journal of Religion (1932): 80-93.
- Women's International League for Peace and Freedom. 1915-1965: A Record of Fifty Years' Work, with Margaret Tims (Allen & Unwin, London, 1965). 1980 Reissue: Aiden Press as Pioneers for Peace: Women's International League for Peace and Freedom 1915-1965.
