= Dorothy Smith Gruening =

American pacifist

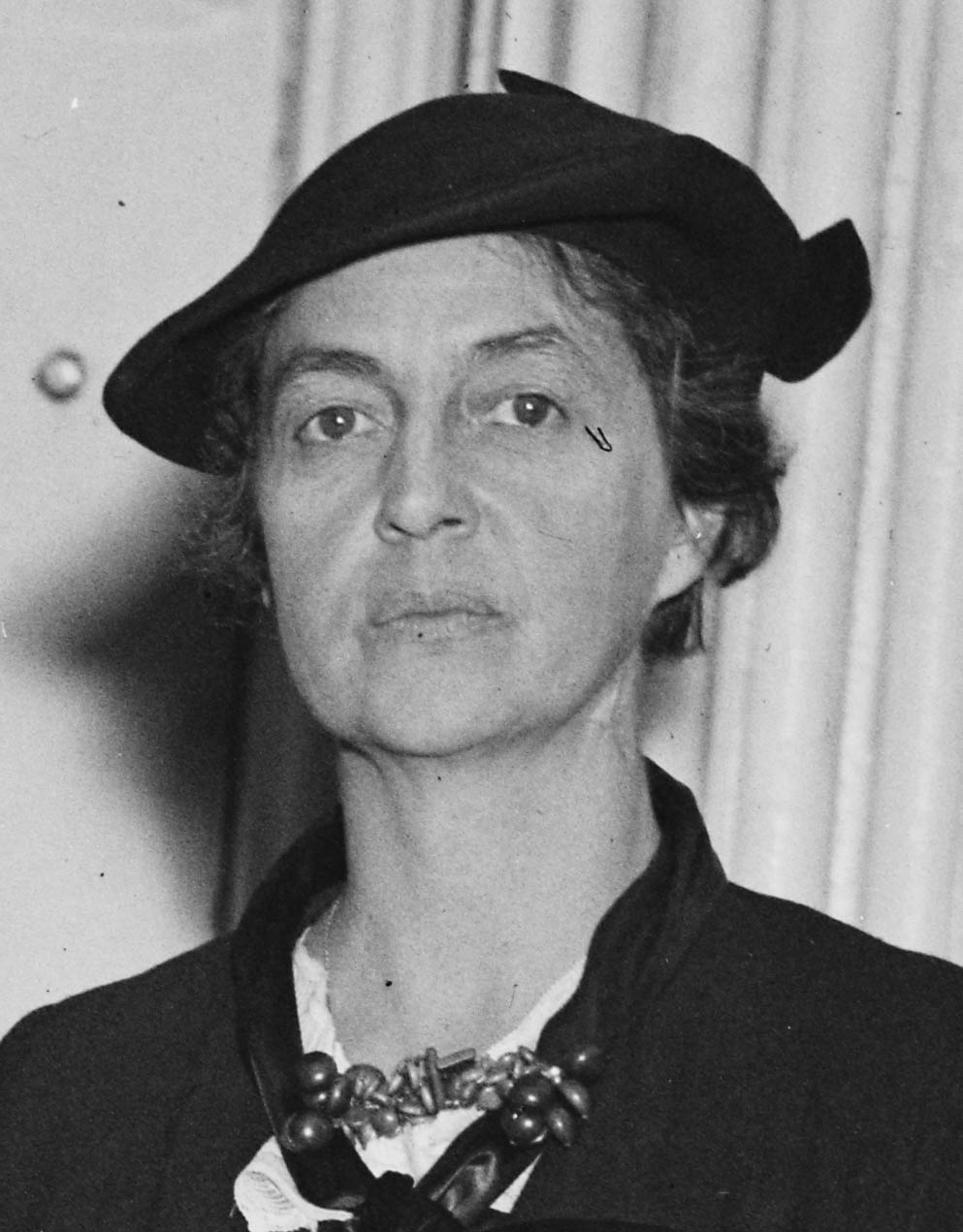
- Born: Dorothy Elizabeth Smith; 1888
- Died: 1979 (aged 90–91)
- Education: Vassar College
- Occupation: Social Activist
- Spouse: Ernest Gruening (m. 1914)

Dorothy Gruening née Smith (1888–1979) was known for her social activism. Specifically, she was the general secretary of the Salem, Massachusetts Young Women's Association, and was active in the Women's International League for Peace and Freedom.

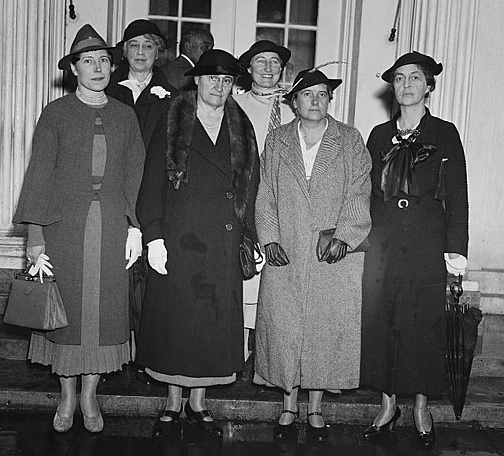
"Peace issues discussed with president, Washington, D.C. Sept. 30, 1936. Delegation from the Women's International League for Peace and Freedom leaving the White House today after discussing peace issues with President Roosevelt. The women plan to campaign during the month of October. In the group, left to right: (front) Miss Dorothy Detzer, recently returned from the world Peace Congress in Brussels; Mrs. Hannah Clothier Hull, President of the League; Dr. Gertrude C. Bussey, of Goucher College; Mrs. Ernest Gruening. Back row, left to right: Mrs. Frank Aydelotte, of Swarthmore, Pa., and Mrs. Mildred S. Olmstead, who just made an expensive trip through the West and Middle West speaking on the need for peace"

She was a graduate of Vassar College. In 1914 she married the journalist, Ernest Gruening, who became the Governor of the Alaska Territory from 1939 until 1953, and a United States Senator from Alaska from 1959 until 1969.
