= Scalby, North Yorkshire =

Village in North Yorkshire, England

Coordinates: 54°18′02″N 0°26′45″W

Scalby
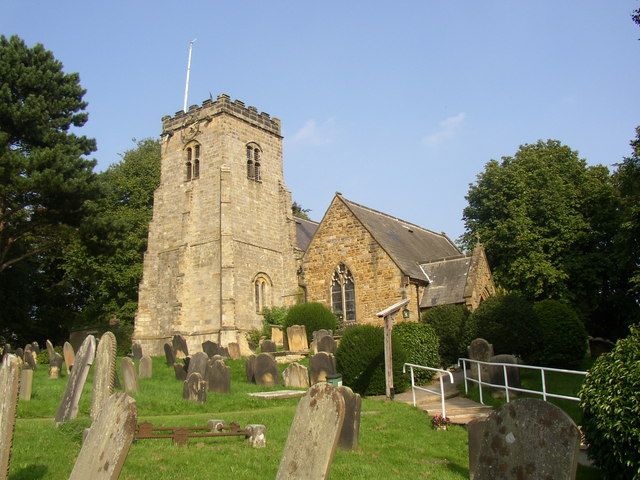
- St Laurence's Church, Scalby

- Location within North Yorkshire
- OS grid reference: TA011907
- Civil parish: Newby and Scalby
- Unitary authority: North Yorkshire
- Ceremonial county: North Yorkshire
- Region: Yorkshire and the Humber
- Country: England
- Sovereign state: United Kingdom
- Post town: SCARBOROUGH
- Postcode district: YO13
- Dialling code: 01723
- Police: North Yorkshire
- Fire: North Yorkshire
- Ambulance: Yorkshire

Scalby, a village on the north edge of Scarborough, North Yorkshire, England, is part of the civil parish of Newby and Scalby. From 1902 to 1974, Scalby was an urban district in the North Riding of Yorkshire.

Scalby is 2.5 miles (4 km) north of Scarborough, and is separated from the town's suburbs by the Scalby Beck, which flows to the North Sea at Scalby Mills. Scalby is a village which is bisected by the A171 Scarborough to Whitby road. The older part of the village is west of the main crossroads and is focused around a small but busy High Street.

== History ==
The name Scalby derives from Scalli's Village, Scalli being an old Scandinavian name.

Originally, Scalby had its own Urban District Council which was operational between 1902 and 1974. When the UDC was abolished, the Parish Council came into effect.

From 1974 to 2023 it was part of the Borough of Scarborough. It is now administered by the unitary North Yorkshire Council.

Scalby belongs to the ward of Scalby, Hackness and Staintondale, which the 2001 census records as having a population of 3,953 over an expanse of 10,186 hectares. Scalby has been twinned with the village of Pornic in north-west France since 1989.

== Geography ==
In modern times, as an artificial flood relief channel, much of the flow of the River Derwent (which drains a large area of the North York Moors into the Vale of Pickering) has been diverted, (about 6 miles (10 km) upstream of West Ayton and before it reaches the plain of the Vale of Pickering), into a new channel called the Sea Cut which runs east along a previously dry side valley (probably a glacial overflow channel) and into the existing Scalby Beck.

== Landmarks ==
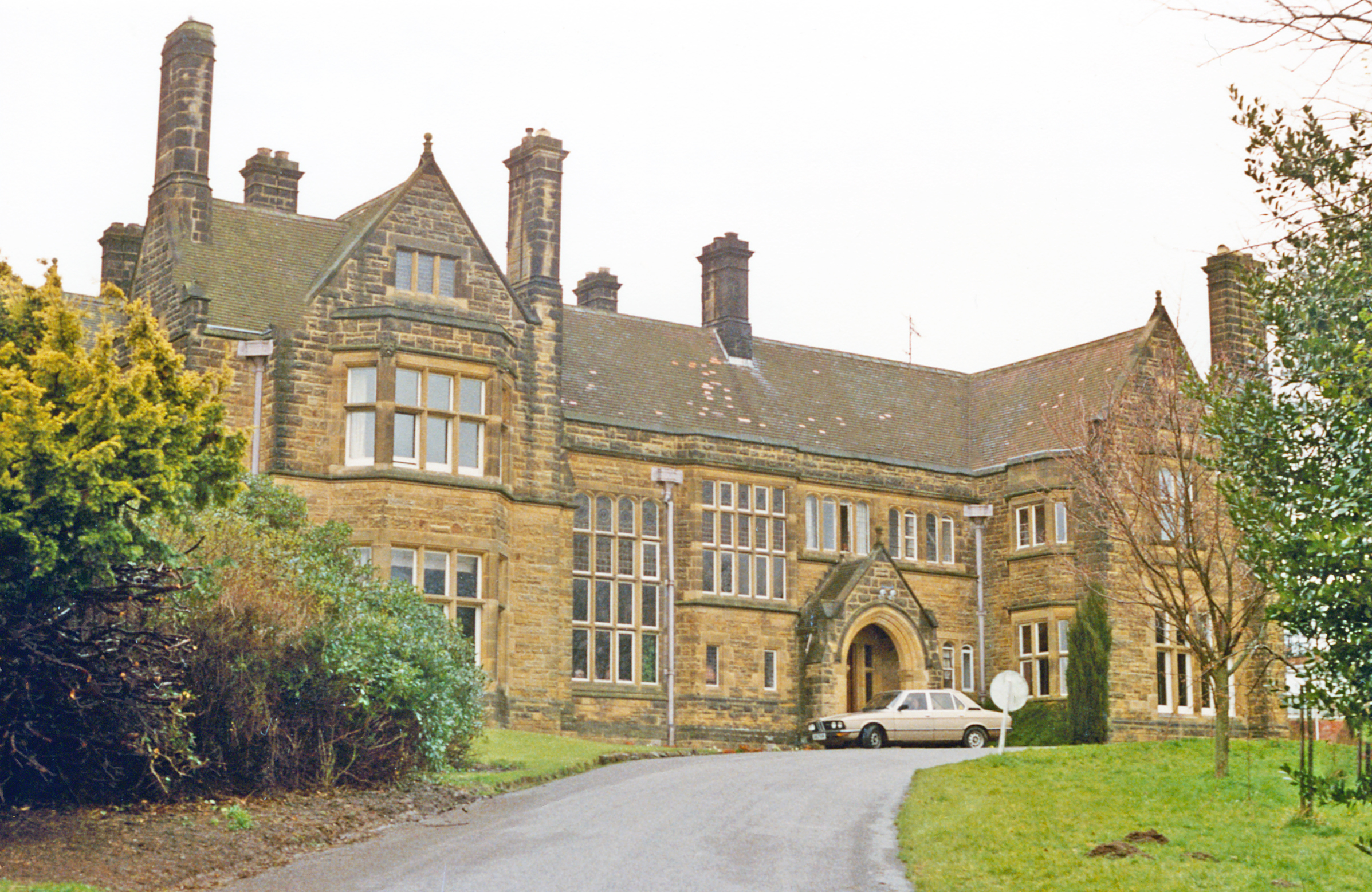
Wrea Head Hall

There are two pubs, a newsagent, village store (replaced by a beauty salon in October 2013), two restaurants and a local hair salon. St Laurence's Church, Scalby is the parish church. The church is the oldest recorded building in the village. Records show its presentation in 1150 by Eustace Fitz John. The chancel arch and pillars are of that time and the first recorded priest, inducted in 1238, was Henry Devon. It is designated a Grade II* listed building. In addition there is Scalby Methodist Chapel and the Church Rooms.

To the northwest is the Gothic country house, Wrea Head Hall, built in 1881. It is named after the hill in the vicinity, Wrea Head Rigg, and is set in 11 acres of woodland. In the 1940s it was bequeathed to North Yorkshire County Council and was used as a college until it became a hotel in 1981. In 2012 the hotel was purchased by Mark Giles, a former doctor and Hollywood marketer Gerry Aburrow, who initiated a six-year renovation of the house and its 21 bedrooms between 2012 and 2018, with Burlington of London fittings, Italian carrara marble, Duresta furniture and Wilton carpets.

== Sport and leisure ==
The village is well served by sports facilities. Scalby Tennis Club is located to the east of the junction of the A171 and Station Road. The club has two floodlit courts and further use of two public courts adjacent to the private courts. Additionally there is the Scalby & Newby Lawn Bowling club which shares the site and the clubhouse. On a small hill behind the western limits of the village is the location of Scalby Cricket Club (Carr Lane playing fields which are held in trust by the Parish Council). During the winter months this doubles as a football pitch.

In January 2009, Scarborough Rugby club moved from their old grounds in Newby to a new purpose-built club on the northern edge of Scalby, adjacent to the A171.

The village has a number of B&Bs and holiday cottages along with the prominent Wrea Head Country Hotel, built in 1881 as the family home of John Ellis, MP and his wife Maria and Scalby Manor, built in 1885.

The 48 miles (77 km) Tabular Hills Walk starts at Scalby Mills and goes westwards tracing the southern extent of the North York Moors park and finishes in Helmsley.

Scalby hosts an annual fair in June which started in 1977 as part of Queen Elizabeth II's silver jubilee celebrations and continues to this day.

== Transport ==
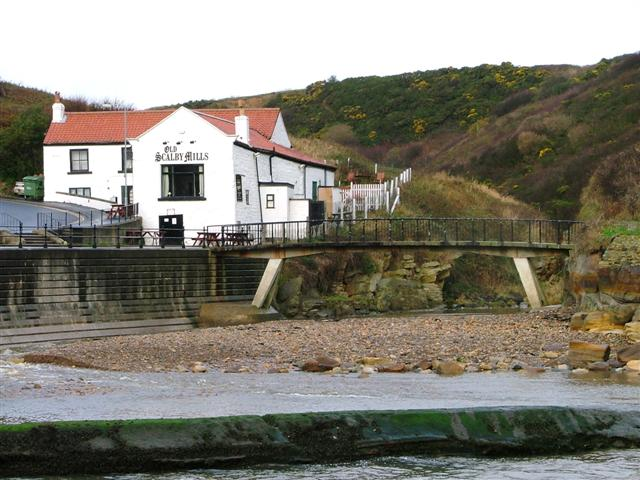
Scalby Beck and the Old Scalby Mills

Scalby has two A roads running through it (the A165 and the A171); both go south to Scarborough and both meet up just north of Scalby at Burniston and continue as the A171 road to Whitby and Teesside. The A165 is further east in the parish passing through the Scalby Mills area.

Scalby has one railway station at Scalby Mills on the narrow gauge North Bay Railway. Services leave to Peasholm Park in Scarborough's North Bay. The village used to have a station on the now closed Scarborough to Whitby Railway. The station at Scalby closed in 1953, some 12 years before the other stations (and the line itself) closed down as a result of the Beeching Axe.

There is a regular (half hourly) bus service to and from Scarborough with many going on to Cloughton, Ravenscar and Whitby. Another bus service operates a circular pattern that links the village with the Sea Life Centre and the railway station in Scarborough.

== Notable people ==
- Edward Charles Booth — Edwardian novelist whose books about the East Riding were compared to the Wessex novels by Thomas Hardy.
- Max Jaffa — musician and bandleader, at Argyll Lodge, High Street.
- John Wilhelm Rowntree — confectionery manufacturer and Quaker religious activist and reformer
- Lawrence Rowntree – British soldier, only son of John Wilhelm Rowntree
- Edith Maud Ellis — Quaker and anti-war activist
- John Ellis — Liberal politician
- Maria Rowntree - wife of John Ellis
- George Wilfred Proudfoot — Conservative politician

== Twin towns ==
- Pornic, France

== See also ==
- Listed buildings in Newby and Scalby
