= Lucy Lewis =

Lucy Lewis may refer to:

- Lucy Biddle Lewis (1861–1941), American Quaker suffragist and peace activist
- Lucy Jefferson Lewis (1752–1811), American younger sister of U.S. President Thomas Jefferson
- Lucy M. Lewis (1898–1992), Native American potter
- Lucy Lewis, the titular character of New Zealand web series Lucy Lewis Can't Lose
