= Newby and Scalby =

Civil parish in North Yorkshire, England

Coordinates: 54.305°N 0.437°W

- Civil parish
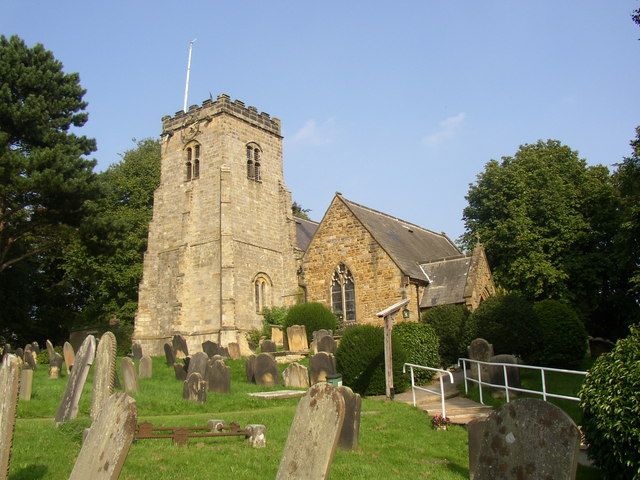
- St Laurence's Church, Scalby

- Area: 5.13 sq mi (13.3 km^{2})
- Population: 9,513 (2011 census)
  - Density: 1,854/sq mi (716/km^{2})
- OS grid reference: TA008905
- Civil parish: Newby and Scalby
- Unitary authority: North Yorkshire
- Ceremonial county: North Yorkshire
- Region: Yorkshire and the Humber
- Country: England
- Sovereign state: United Kingdom
- Post town: SCARBOROUGH
- Postcode district: YO13
- Police: North Yorkshire
- Fire: North Yorkshire
- Ambulance: Yorkshire
- UK Parliament: Scarborough and Whitby

Newby and Scalby is a civil parish in North Yorkshire, England. formed by the smaller southern area of Newby and the larger, northern, area of Scalby. From 1974 to 2023 it was in Scarborough district. It has the status of a town council.

== Geography ==
The shape of the parish is a rectangle perpendicular to the coast, omitting the south-east corner which is the sea life centre and park of Scarborough, with a north-west rectangular projection most of which is closer to Burniston than Scalby. The village forms one large cluster in the mid-south of this area traversed by several small roads and passing through is a section of the relatively minor A171. Newby is south of the Scalby Beck (or Sea Cut) and is physically undivided from the rest of Scarborough. The coast here is cliffs topped by the Cleveland Way including Scalby Ness.

== Demography ==
According to the 2011 UK census, Newby and Scalby parish had a population of 9,513. At the time of the last census the rate of home ownership (with or without a loan) was greater than the average in the district and the proportion of social housing was significantly lower in terms of housing stock. The population here had decreased by 2.4% from the 2001 UK census figure of 9,748.

2011 Published Statistics: Population, home ownership and extracts from Physical Environment, surveyed in 2005
Output area	Homes owned outright	Owned with a loan	Socially rented	Privately rented	Shared ownership	Other	km^{2} green spaces	km^{2} roads	km^{2} water	km^{2} domestic gardens	km^{2} domestic buildings	km^{2} non-domestic buildings	Usual residents	km^{2}
Newby and Scalby	2,182	1,277	306	321	45	64	10.45	0.50	0.48	1.67	0.38	0.06	9,513	13.29

== Amenities ==
Scalby has the high street of the two settlements, commercial at street-level leading westward and upwards into the North York Moors National Park.

Scarborough RUFC, play and train immediately north of the built-up area. A separate ground in Scarborough itself is the ground of Scarborough Pirates ARLFC.

Scalby Cricket Club and Scalby Football Club share a ground on Carr Lane.

St Laurence's Church, Scalby was built in the 13th century and is a grade II* listed building, the middle category of listing. St Joseph's Church, Newby is the local Catholic church.

Newby and Scalby Primary School is the main amenity named after both villages or suburbs. Scalby School is local secondary school in the parish.

Newby and Scalby Library and Information Centre is run by volunteers after being threatened with closure. It is a registered charity, and operates in partnership with North Yorkshire County Council. In 2026 it was chosen by the Poet Laureatue Simon Armitage as a venue for his annual library tour, which in 2026 visited libraries in places with initials N-P.

== See also ==
- Listed buildings in Newby and Scalby
