= Ludwell Denny =

American journalist

- Born: Ludwell Howard Denny; November 18, 1894; Boonville, Indiana
- Died: October 12, 1970 (aged 75); Monterey, California
- Education: University of Chicago
- Occupations: Journalist, columnist, writer, minister
- Years active: 1921-1970
- Employer: The Nation
- Notable work: We Fight for Oil (1928); America conquers Britain: A Record of Economic War (1930)
- Spouses: Josephine Shryock (m. 1917; died 1953) Dorothy Detzer (m. 1954–1970)
- Awards: Freedom Foundation Editorial Award (1953); Scripps-Howard Roy W. Howard Award (1959)
- Minister
- Church: First Unitarian Church of Rochester
- In office: 1917-1921

Personal details
- Denomination: Unitarianism
- Education: Meadville Theological School

Ludwell Howard Denny (November 18, 1894 – October 12, 1970) began his career as a Unitarian minister but soon switched to journalism, becoming a nationally known columnist, editor and editorial writer.

== Biography ==
Denny was born on November 18, 1894, in Boonville, Indiana. He attended the University of Chicago and trained for the ministry at Meadville Theological School in Meadville, Pennsylvania. He served as minister of the First Unitarian Church of Rochester from 1917 to 1921.

The Rochester Unitarians hired Denny upon his graduation from Meadville, where he had shown early talent by winning the school's award for public speaking three years in a row. In his memoir, Dexter Perkins, chair of the history department of the University of Rochester and a leading member of First Unitarian, described Denny as "the best pulpit man I have ever known".

Denny left the ministry after four years, however, expressing a desire to pursue his interest in world affairs. He first worked as European correspondent for The Nation and later served a variety of positions in the newspaper industry, including editor of the Indianapolis Times and chief editorial writer for the Scripps-Howard newspaper chain. He published two books: We Fight for Oil (1928) and America Conquers Britain: A Record of Economic War (1930). He received the Freedom Foundation Editorial Award in 1953 and the Scripps-Howard Roy W. Howard Award in 1959.

In 1917, he married Josephine Shryock, who, raised in Meadville, was taking classes at the school while Denny was there. She died in 1953. In 1954, Denny married Dorothy Detzer, who had served as Executive Secretary of the US section of the Women's International League for Peace and Freedom for twenty years.

Denny died on October 12, 1970, in Monterey, California.
