= John Rowntree =

John Rowntree may refer to:

- John Stephenson Rowntree (1834–1907), director of Rowntree's confectionery company and reformer of the Quaker movement
- John Wilhelm Rowntree (1868–1905), chocolate and confectionery manufacturer and Quaker religious activist
