= Dorothy H. Hutchinson =

American activist, lecturer and author

Dorothy Hewitt Hutchinson
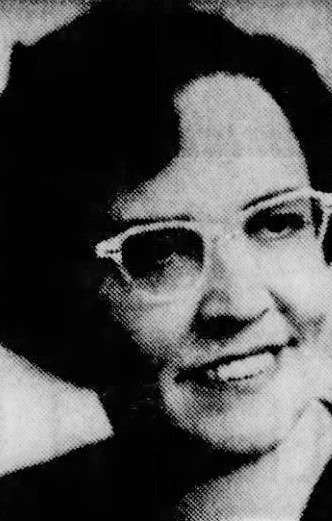
- Dorothy H. Hutchinson, 1958
- Born: October 1905; Middletown, Connecticut, United States
- Died: November 4, 1984 (aged 79); Jenkintown, Pennsylvania, United States
- Occupations: Peace, civil rights and environmental activist, lecturer and author
- Years active: 1940s to 1970s
- Known for: First American woman to serve as the international chair of the Women's International League for Peace and Freedom since Jane Addams co-founded the organization in 1915

Dorothy Hewitt Hutchinson (October 1905 – November 4, 1984) was an American peace, civil rights and environmental activist, lecturer and author during the twentieth century. An advocate of nuclear disarmament, she became the president of American branch of the Women's International League for Peace and Freedom (WILPF) in 1961 and the international chair of WILPF in 1965, the first American woman to hold that position since Jane Addams co-founded the organization in 1915.

She was also one of the peace activists engaged in the fight for voting rights for African-Americans during this same time. As a polio survivor, she was supported by a leg brace and cane as she marched with the Rev. Dr. Martin Luther King Jr. in Alabama.

Interviewed about her activism in 1965, she said:

"Dissent from public policy can be the highest form of patriotism.... I don't think democracy can survive without it, even though you may be crucified by it at times."

== Formative years and family ==
Born in Middletown, Connecticut in October 1905, Dorothy Hewitt was raised by parents who were Methodists; however, she was also exposed to, and influenced early on, by interactions with members of the Religious Society of Friends. Diagnosed with polio at the age of five, she recovered, but was required to use a leg brace and cane in order to walk for much of the remainder of her life. She subsequently graduated with a Bachelor of Arts degree from Mount Holyoke College in 1927, and was awarded a Doctor of Philosophy degree in zoology by Yale University in 1932.

In 1933, she wed Robert Cranford Hutchinson (1904-1981), a native of New Jersey who was a professor at Philadelphia's Jefferson Medical College (now Thomas Jefferson University). They subsequently adopted three children: Robert Cranford Hutchinson Jr., who was born on March 21, 1936, son Hewitt and daughter Evelyn.

During this time, she and her family lived in Fallsington, Pennsylvania; in 1940, she joined that community's Falls Monthly Meeting. Within three years, the Society of Friends was publishing her written works. Hutchinson and her family subsequently moved from Fallsington to Jenkintown; she then joined the Abington Friends Meeting, where she began teaching spirituality-related classes for adults.

Longtime residents of the Rydal neighborhood in Abington Township, Montgomery County, she and her husband retired to the community of Sewanee in Franklin County, Tennessee in 1969. He preceded her in death there in 1981; his remains were returned to Pennsylvania for burial, and were interred at the Frenchtown Cemetery in Towanda in Bradford County.

Her son, Robert, died on August 12, 2007, and was also interred at the Frenchtown Cemetery in Towanda.

== Activism ==
From the 1940s through the 1980s, Dorothy H. Hutchinson was an active advocate for a freeze on the development, testing and use of nuclear weapons. During this time, she participated in, and organized hunger strikes, sit-ins and other protests against multiple corporate and government agencies.

A co-founder and member of the Peace Now Movement in 1943 and 1944, she began working with psychology professor George W. Hartmann and John Collett, a refugee from Nazi-occupied Norway, to pressure the U.S. government and its allies to negotiate a settlement, rather than forcing Germany and Japan to surrender unconditionally in order to end World War II more quickly. As her visibility increased with her activism, she became the target of intense criticism by a significant percentage of Americans who felt she was supporting enemies of the United States during the war. She subsequently began receiving death threats, which exacerbated her post-polio syndrome symptoms of pain and fatigue, prompting her to resign from the Peace Now Movement in order to recuperate. Focused on raising her family as her health improved, she gradually resumed writing and lecturing about her spiritual and political beliefs.

Post-war, she helped to support the world disarmament efforts of the United Nations by establishing a local chapter of the United World Federalists, but soon moved on to other work when she realized the group's platform did not also include strategies for international dispute negotiation and resolution.

In 1954, she and Hazel DuBois embarked on a "Journey of Friendship," during which they "traveled the globe as Quaker emissaries, studying social conditions and carrying messages of peace and brotherhood."

In 1958, she raised international awareness of the continuing danger posed by nuclear arms testing by staging a five-day fast at the United States Atomic Energy Commission. Two years later, she attended and wrote about the World Peoples Conference in Geneva, Switzerland. In November 1959, she presented the opening address at the Religious Society of Friends' conference, "Crime and the Treatment of Offenders," in Germantown. The first conference hosted by Friends members in the United States on this topic, it was sponsored by the Friends World Committee.

The national president and international chair of the Women's International League for Peace and Freedom (WILPF) during the 1960s, she lectured and wrote extensively about the need for peaceful strategies to prevent and settle international disputes. In 1961, she participated in the Bryn Mawr Conference of American and Soviet Women. On May 1, 1962, she was the only woman to participate as a member of the Quaker delegation to the White House, which met with U.S. President John F. Kennedy that day to voice its concerns regarding the nation's continued testing of nuclear weapons. In December 1962, she was one of roughly twenty academics, members of the clergy, scientists, and other civic leaders who wrote a letter to Kennedy, urging him, as president of the United States, "to establish direct telephone or teletype communications with the Kremlin" as a way to "avert irrevocable mistakes" during the new "nuclear age" that the world was facing.

The next year (1963), she served as an emissary from WILPF, and met with government leaders while touring Poland. In 1964, she led a peace delegation on a tour of the Soviet Union, during which time Hutchinson and her fellow delegates visited the Kremlin in Moscow, where they urged officials to offer greater freedom to residents of their nation while working to find peaceful ways to resolve international conflicts.

She also participated in the American civil rights actions of the 1950s and 1960s. One of the women who marched with the Rev. Dr. Martin Luther King Jr. in Birmingham and Montgomery, Alabama, Hutchinson helped Coretta Scott King to manage the switchboard in the Selma, Alabama headquarters of the Southern Christian Leadership Conference that enabled civil rights activists to remain in contact with organizers throughout the progress of the fifty-four-mile "One Man, One Vote" march from Selma to Montgomery, Alabama in 1965, a march in which peaceful protestors were so brutally attacked by an anti-civil rights mob and police that nationwide news coverage of the violence prompted U.S. President Lyndon B. Johnson to pressure the United States Congress to pass meaningful voting rights legislation.

In 1961, she wrote "The spiritual basis of Quaker social concern" for the Friends General Conference in which she outlined "seven characteristics of Quaker social concerns":

"First and foremost, a Quaker concern requires a prepared individual. This preparation, in the great among us, seems to have a pattern which is visible in retrospect but is not visible to the individual at the time he is being prepared.... It seems that faithfulness in apparently unrelated aspects of life is preparation most necessary for a Friend who will be subsequently called to carry through a concern.

A second characteristic of a Friends' social concern is that the concerned individual makes direct contact with the evil which needs attention....

A third characteristic of the concerned Friend is his ability to establish empathy with the objects of his concern, e.g. to achieve imaginative identification with prisoners as Elizabeth Fry did....

A fourth characteristic of the concerned Quaker is his willingness to work for any minor, unspectacular, partial solution of a big problem, which seems, at the moment, achievable. Often minor reforms are the only realistic possibility and to over-reach is to prevent any progress....

A fifth characteristic of a Quaker's concern is that it does not rest until it has penetrated through the superficial evil to its root causes. In looking for causes, Quakers cannot, as many Christians have done, fall back upon the hopeless depravity of man as the cause of social evils. Friends recognize that man's depravity is real, but they have never considered it his essential quality nor felt obliged to wait till man is less depraved before attacking social evils. They have, on the contrary, felt that, since every man contains the Divine essence, we need not be without hope. Friends, therefore, look for social causes and at least partial cures for social evils....

A sixth characteristic of social concern is that the person who is sensitive to one social concern becomes inevitably more sensitive to all social evils....

Lastly, the person with a social concern is willing to accept censure and ridicule.... Yet in the last analysis, obedience to the Light is the only satisfying course. Approval is not the criterion.... Results are not the criterion.... The results, when they appear, will rest upon the foundations laid by many anonymous builders. To be one of these is not to fail."

Hutchinson also organized and led protests at the White House and elsewhere against the Vietnam War during the 1960s and 1970s, and continued to lecture and write about the need for nuclear disarmament, expanding her educational outreach efforts to help raise international awareness about the Strategic Arms Limitation Talks (SALT) between the United States and the Soviet Union to restrict further development of nuclear weapons. In 1968, she was appointed as a Quaker delegate to the first Symposium on Peace, an interfaith gathering that was held that year in New Delhi, India. She subsequently traveled to Vietnam to try to build a bridge between American and Vietnamese officials in order to end the war there.

In 1969, she and her fellow WILPF members launched a "Bread and Peace" campaign to encourage Americans to pressure their elected officials to spend less on military funding and more on financial support to eradicate poverty across the nation.

She also became an environmental protection activist with the Save Our Seas Movement during the 1970s.

== Death and interment ==
Hutchinson died at the age of seventy-eight at a nursing home in Jenkintown on November 4, 1984. Her memorial service was held at Jenkintown's Abington Friends Meetinghouse. She was interred at the Frenchtown Cemetery in Towanda, Pennsylvania.

== Awards and other honors ==
Honorary Doctorate, Humane Letters, Mount Holyoke College, 1977

== Publications and other written works ==
During the 1940s, Hutchinson maintained a diary that later became "The War Record of a Pacifist: World War II Diary, Partial," an unpublished manuscript that is housed in the Swarthmore College Peace Collection at the library of Swarthmore College in Pennsylvania. Sometime during or after the late 1950s, she compiled and annotated letters that documented her 1954 Journey of Friendship world tour with Hazel Dubois to create "Letters of Friendship," which is also housed in that same collection.

Hutchinson co-authored Peace in Vietnam: A New Approach, which was published in 1966 by the American Friends Service Committee. She also wrote the content for multiple information pamphlets, including:

- "Must the Killing Go On? A Peace Catechism," which was published by the Peace Now Movement in 1943;
- "A Call to Peace Now," which was published by the Society of Friends in 1943;
- "Toward World Political Community," which was published by the Women's International League for Peace and Freedom in 1965; and
- "Proposal for an Honorable Peace in Vietnam," which was published by the Women's International League for Peace and Freedom in 1968.

In 1979, she created a 140-page manuscript, "Living without a Plan," which she subsequently donated to the Swarthmore College Library with the stipulation that it never be published in full.

== See also ==
- One man, one vote
- Voting Rights Act of 1965
