= Listed buildings in Newby and Scalby =

Newby and Scalby is a civil parish in the county of North Yorkshire, England. It contains 28 listed buildings that are recorded in the National Heritage List for England. Of these, one is listed at Grade II*, the middle of the three grades, and the others are at Grade II, the lowest grade. The parish is to the north of Scarborough and contains the larger area of Scalby to the north and the smaller area of Newby to the south. Most of the listed buildings are houses, cottages and associated structures, farmhouses and farm buildings, and the others include two churches, a sundial and a war memorial in one churchyard, a former watermill, and a public house.

== Key ==
| Grade | Criteria |
|---|---|
| II* | Particularly important buildings of more than special interest |
| II | Buildings of national importance and special interest |

== Buildings ==
| Name and location | Photograph | Date | Notes | Grade |
|---|---|---|---|---|
| St Laurence's Church; 54.29867°N 0.45098°W | | Late 12th to early 13th century | The church has been altered and extended through the centuries, with the tower dating from 1683, and a restoration in 1859–60. It is built in sandstone with a stone flag roof, and consists of a nave, a south aisle, a south porch, a chancel, and a west tower. The tower has two stages, diagonal buttresses, a stair tower, a round-headed south window, four-light bell openings with semicircular hood moulds, a string course, a west clock face, and an embattled parapet. The north wall of the church retains medieval masonry. | II* |
| Sundial; 54.29852°N 0.45101°W | | 17th century | The sundial stands to the south of the porch of St Laurence's Church. It is in sandstone, and has a base probably of a medieval date about 1.25 metres (4 ft 1 in) tall with an inscription and a date. The plate and gnomon are in brass. | II |
| Newby Barn; 54.29601°N 0.44099°W | — | 1675 | The barn is in sandstone, and has a pantile roof with coped gables and moulded kneelers. There is one storey and a loft, and four bays. On the front are three pitching windows. The rear contains doors, fixed-light windows, pitching windows and an initialled datestone. External steps lead up to an upper floor doorway. | II |
| Pigsty, Newby Farm; 54.29608°N 0.44087°W | — | Late 17th century (probable) | The pigsty is in sandstone and has a modern roof. The plan is of a square circle with a cut-off corner. It consists of a row of feeding troughs, six pairs with round heads, and one pair with a flat head. In the cut-off corner is a doorway. | II |
| Holly Bank; 54.30318°N 0.44772°W | — | Early 18th century | A farmhouse with an outbuilding, later a private house, in sandstone, with a pantile roof, coped gables and kneelers. There are two storeys and four bays, and a rear outshut. On the front is a doorway with a rectangular fanlight. There is a blocked fire window, and the other windows are sashes, all but one horizontally-sliding. | II |
| Lodge Cottage; 54.28532°N 0.44066°W | — | Early 18th century | A longhouse, later a house incorporating the low end, in sandstone with a pantile roof, and tumbled-in brickwork on the south gable. There are two storeys and three bays. The original house part contains horizontally-sliding sash windows, and in the low part is a sash window on the ground floor and a casement window above. | II |
| Gate piers, Yew Court grounds 54.30055°N 0.44640°W | | c. 1742 | The gate piers are in sandstone, and have a circular plan, with a diameter of about 2 metres (6 ft 7 in). There are two oval openings on the street side of each pier, which has a heavy lintel, a projecting moulded cornice and a domed top. On the garden side are half-glazed doors. | II |
| Summerhouse west of Low Hall Bungalow; 54.29715°N 0.45230°W | — | c. 1750 | The summerhouse is in sandstone on a square plinth, with a continuous impost band, a moulded eaves course, overhanging eaves and a lead roof There is one storey, a square plan, and sides of one bay. Steps lead up to the doorway that has an architrave, a radial fanlight, a rusticated archivolt, and a fasciated keystone. At the rear is a square window, and in the returns are blocked fanlights. | II |
| Pinfold, Newby Farm; 54.29611°N 0.44118°W | — | c. 1750 | The pinfold is a rectangular enclosure with rounded corners. The walls on the north, south and west sides are in stone with cambered coping about 1 metre (3 ft 3 in) high, and the other side is enclosed by a farm building. | II |
| Quoits Ground, Newby Farm; 54.29599°N 0.44109°W | — | c. 1750 | The quoits ground is a rectangular enclosure. The walls on the north, south and west sides are in stone with cambered coping about 1 metre (3 ft 3 in) high, and the other side is enclosed by a barn. | II |
| 431 Scalby Road; 54.29564°N 0.44066°W | — | Mid-18th century | A farmhouse, later a private house, in sandstone, with a slate roof, coped gables and kneelers. There are two storeys, a double depth plan and three bays. The central doorway has a radial fanlight and a pediment on corbels. The windows are sashes with channelled wedge lintels and grooved keystones. | II |
| Ivy Bank; 54.30303°N 0.44708°W | — | Mid-18th century | A farmhouse and outbuilding, later a private house, in sandstone with a slate roof, coped gables and kneelers. There are two storeys and five bays. On the front is a doorway and a segmental-headed lattice porch, and the windows are sashes. The ground floor openings have heavy lintels. | II |
| Melbourne House; 54.29943°N 0.44786°W | — | Mid-18th century | The house is in painted brick on the front with quoins, and in stone at the rear, with a pantile roof, coped gables and moulded kneelers. There are two storeys, three bays, and a rear service range. The central doorway has fluted pilasters, a rectangular fanlight, and a moulded cornice on grooved consoles. The windows are sashes with gauged brick arches. | II |
| Ox Pasture Hall; 54.28835°N 0.46593°W | — | Mid-18th century | The farmhouse is in sandstone and has a pantile roof. There are two storeys, and three bays, the middle bay gabled, and a rear service wing. The central doorway has fluted pilasters, a fanlight and an open pediment. The windows are sash windows with wedge lintels. | II |
| The Manse; 54.29886°N 0.44904°W | | Mid-18th century | The house is in stone with a hipped slate roof. There are two storeys and six bays. The doorway has panelled jambs, a semicircular fanlight, and an open pediment on grooved consoles. The windows are sashes with lintels and keystones, the windows in the left bay larger. | II |
| Former farm buildings north of The Old Farmhouse; 54.28674°N 0.45861°W | — | Mid-18th century | The buildings are in sandstone with pantile roofs, and consist of a central range to the north with one storey and a loft, single storey ranges projecting to the south around a foldyard which is enclosed by a wall. The central range contains a threshing barn, and a three-bay wagon shed, with a hayloft above, and segmental arches with brick [piers at the rear. The left range contains five stables, and the right range has an implement shed and byres. The wall has cambered coping, and contains a blocked central opening, and a gate at the left end. | II |
| 4 Church Beck; 54.29889°N 0.45246°W | — | Late 18th century | The house is in sandstone with a pantile roof. There are two storeys and two bays. On the front is a gabled porch, there is one casement window, a blocked fire window, and the other windows are horizontally-sliding sashes. | II |
| Farmhouse and outbuildings, High Mill Farm; 54.30039°N 0.43149°W | — | Late 18th century | A watermill, corn mill and miller's house, later used as a farm, the buildings are in sandstone with pantile roofs. The main range contains the mill in the centre, the miller's house to the north, and a stable and cartshed to the south. There are other buildings to the north, east and southwest. | II |
| The Old Farmhouse; 54.28620°N 0.45853°W | — | Late 18th century | The house is in sandstone, with brick dressings, an extension in red brick, and roofs in pantile and slate with coped gables and shaped kneelers. There are two storeys, the garden front has five bays, and contains two doorways. There is one fixed-light window, and the other windows are horizontal-sliding sashes, all with segmental arches of gauged brick. The street front has three bays, and a stone outshut to the right. | II |
| Westmeade; 54.30292°N 0.44703°W | — | Late 18th century | The house is in sandstone at the front and brick at the rear, with an eaves course of triglyphs under a moulded gutter with carved lions' head, and a pantile roof with coped gables and moulded kneelers. There are two storeys and an attic, and three bays. Steps lead to a central doorway with an architrave, a radial fanlight and an open pediment on brackets. The windows are sashes, the window above the doorway with a single light and the others tripartite, and all have gauged brick arches with fasciated keystones. In the attic are two 20th-century dormers. | II |
| Prospect House Farmhouse; 54.30415°N 0.47681°W | | 1817 | The farmhouse is in painted sandstone, with a floor band, an eaves band, a coped parapet, and a roof of slate at the front and flags at the rear, with stone coping and kneelers. There are two storeys, three bays, and single-storey lean-to extensions on the sides. Steps lead up to a central doorway flanked by pilaster jambs with imposts, and there is a rectangular fanlight and a cornice. The windows are sashes with channelled wedge lintels, and in the left gable wall is a circular window with a moulded surround. | II |
| 29 and 31 High Street; 54.30005°N 0.44816°W | — | Early 19th century | A house and an attached cottage in sandstone with a slate roof. There are two storeys, and each part has two bays. Each building has a doorway with a rectangular fanlight approached by steps, and the windows are sashes, those on the ground floor with plain lintels. | II |
| Howdale Cottage; 54.29971°N 0.44820°W | — | Early 19th century | The house is in sandstone with a slate roof. There are two storeys, a double depth plan, and two bays. To the left is a blocked cart entrance, and to the right is a doorway with a rectangular fanlight. The windows are sashes. | II |
| Newby Farmhouse; 54.29582°N 0.44081°W | — | Early 19th century | The house is in red brick on a stone plinth, with a string course, a dentilled eaves cornice, and a slate roof with stone coping and kneelers. There are two storeys and three bays. Stone steps lead up to the doorway that has a plain surround and a rectangular fanlight. The windows are sashes, and all the openings have channelled wedge lintels and keystones. | II |
| The Nag's Head Inn; 54.29996°N 0.44837°W | | Early 19th century | The public house is in sandstone, with a projecting moulded eaves cornice and a hipped slate roof. There are two storeys and a square plan, with a front of three bays, and two bays on the left return. The central doorway has pilasters, an entablature, a rectangular fanlight, and a cornice. The windows are sashes. | II |
| Holt Cottage, Scalby Holt and The Holt; 54.30044°N 0.44634°W | | 1886 | A house divided into three, with a stone plinth. The ground floor at the front is rendered with quoins, and above it is tile-hung, with the middle bay timber framed. The rear is in brick on the ground floor and the upper floor is timber framed. Throughout there are stone dressings, and the roof is tiled. The middle bay contains a doorway with a moulded surround and an ogee head. The storey above is jettied on carved brackets, and it contains a casement window, above which is a gable with bargeboards. Other features include a two-storey canted bay window with a hipped roof and a terracotta dragon, mullioned and transomed windows, and a terracotta string course. On the garden front is a bressummer carved with initials and the date. | II |
| War memorial 54.29900°N 0.45052°W | | 1920 | The war memorial is in the churchyard of St Laurence's Church, to the north of the church. It is in stone, and has a triangular base, on which are two hexagonal steps. On these is a hexagonal base, and a taller hexagonal pier, surmounted by a stepped hexagonal plinth, and a tall hexagonal cross with a carved sword. On the pier are inscriptions relating to both World Wars. | II |
| St Joseph's Church; 54.29348°N 0.42878°W | | 1958–60 | The church, designed by Francis Johnson, is in brown brick with stone dressings, statues in Doulting stone, and a pantile roof. It consists of a nave, an organ loft, and a chancel flanked by chapels and vestries. At the west end are projecting staircase towers containing niches with statues, square windows in the returns, and surmounted by obelisks. The central doorway has a segmental arch, it is flanked by a blind arcaded screens, and above it is a Calvary, a round window, and a bellcote with a cross. The nave windows are mullioned and transomed, with three lights and arched heads. | II |
