= Hannah Clothier Hull =

American pacifist and suffragist (1872-1958)

Hannah Hallowell Clothier Hull
- Born: Hannah Hallowell Clothier; July 21, 1872; Sharon Hill, Pennsylvania, U.S.
- Died: July 4, 1958 (aged 85); Swarthmore, Pennsylvania, U.S.
- Burial place: West Laurel Hill Cemetery, Bala Cynwyd, Pennsylvania, U.S.
- Education: Swarthmore College
- Occupations: clubwoman, feminist, and pacifist
- Organization(s): Women's Peace Party, Women's International League for Peace and Freedom
- Spouse: William Isaac Hull (m. 1898–1939)
- Relatives: William Clothier (brother)

Hannah Hallowell Clothier Hull (July 21, 1872 – July 4, 1958) was an American pacifist and suffragist. She was one of the founders and leaders of the Women's Peace Party and the Women's International League for Peace and Freedom. She served as vice-chairman of the board of the American Friends Service Committee from 1928 to 1947.

== Early life ==
She was born Hannah Hallowell Clothier July 21, 1872, in Sharon Hill, Pennsylvania, to Quaker parents Isaac Hallowell Clothier and Mary Clapp Jackson Clothier. Her father was co-founder of the Strawbridge & Clothier department stores. She attended Friends' Central School in Philadelphia and graduated from Swarthmore College in 1891. She took graduate level classes in history and biblical literature at Bryn Mawr College from 1896 to 1897.

== Career ==
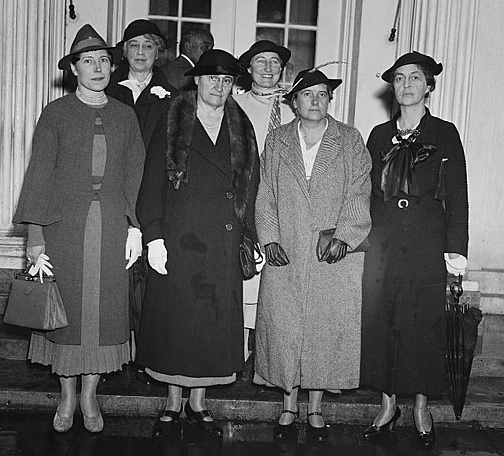
Photo from 1936 showing delegation from the Women's International League for Peace and Freedom leaving the White House. In the group, left to right: (front) Miss Dorothy Detzer; Mrs. Hannah Clothier Hull; Dr. Gertrude C. Bussey; Mrs. Ernest Gruening. Back row, left to right: Mrs. Frank Aydelotte, and Mrs. Mildred S. Olmstead

Since her conservative family did not allow her to work after graduation, she volunteered at the College Settlement House in Philadelphia.

Hull first became involved in organized peace activities after she attended the Second Hague Conference for International Peace in 1907 with her husband. She served as vice-president of the Pennsylvania Woman Suffrage Association from 1913 to 1914. She was chair of the Women's Peace Party in Pennsylvania from 1914 to 1919, through World War I. In 1922 she attended the International Conference of Women held at the Hague.

She worked with the American Friends Service Committee on their programs to support civilians in France and Russia as well as programs to feed children in Germany and Austria. She served as vice-chairman of the board of the American Friends Service Committee from 1928 to 1947. In 1932 Hull was a delegate to League of Nations Disarmament Conference. She was an officer of the American branch of the Women's International League for Peace and Freedom from 1924 until 1939, and then held the title honorary president until her death in 1958.

She was president of the Swarthmore Woman's Club, and chaired the suffrage committee of the State Federation of Pennsylvania Women. She was on the board of directors at Pendle Hill, a Quaker retreat center in Wallingford, Pennsylvania.

== Personal life ==
Hannah Clothier married fellow Quaker William Isaac Hull, a political science professor at Swarthmore College in 1898. They had two daughters, Mary and Elizabeth. Hull was widowed in 1939.

== Death and legacy ==
Hull died in 1958, after a heart attack at her home in Swarthmore, aged 85 years. She was interred at West Laurel Hill Cemetery in Bala Cynwyd, Pennsylvania. Her papers are archived in the Swarthmore College Peace Collection.

== See also ==
- List of peace activists
