= Lawrence Rowntree =

British soldier (1895–1917)

- Born: 4 March 1895; York, England
- Died: 25 November 1917 (aged 22); Ypres, Belgium
- Burial place: Vlamertinge, Belgium
- Known for: Quaker who later decided to fight as a soldier
- Notable work: Journal and letters
- Parents: John Wilhelm Rowntree (father); Constance Naish (mother)
- Relatives: Joseph Rowntree (grandfather)

Lawrence Edmund Rowntree (4 March 1895 – 25 November 1917) was a British soldier killed during the First World War. He was the only son of John Wilhelm Rowntree of the Quaker Rowntree family and Constance Naish, and grandson of Joseph Rowntree.

Born in York and having grown up in Scalby, Rowntree was educated at Bootham School, and began to study medicine at King's College, Cambridge in 1913.

On the outbreak of the First World War Rowntree volunteered for the Friends' Ambulance Unit in 1914, being deployed in October to Dunkirk and Belgium as an orderly and driver. He brought his grandfather's car from Britain to Europe, converting it into an ambulance. In April 1915, he criticised French stretcher-bearers for their cruelty, reporting that he had seen four of them "drop a wounded man off a stretcher from shoulder height, and laugh". He also wrote that men in the hospital sheds were in straw beds "thick with dirt, blood and septic dressings" from their previous occupants. In May, he wrote of his struggles with shell shock and his emotions:

when anyone closed a door or took his boots off, we arose and slew him ... you don't mind the thought of being wounded, you don't mind the thought of death – much, but there is that great black fear sitting there, and making you feel the lowest of miserable worms.

Rowntree was injured and sent to England to heal, writing up his journal in 1916. Despite his family's pacifist beliefs, he later decided to fight as a soldier (declining to register as a conscientious objector under the Military Service Act 1916), telling his mother in a letter that he had been "feeling a call". He joined the Royal Tank Regiment in 1916, and was injured in the buttocks. He was then commissioned as a second lieutenant into the Royal Field Artillery in 1917 and was killed in the Ypres Salient on 25 November 1917, several weeks after the Battle of Passchendaele had ended.

Rowntree was buried in Vlamertinghe New Military Cemetery in Vlamertinge, West Flanders, Belgium. The headstone bears the inscription Only Son of J.W. Rowntree, Scaley "I believe in the life everlasting" His grandfather, Joseph, spoke of his death for years after, calling him "my dear Lawrie".

Rowntree's letters to his mother Constance, 1901–1917, are deposited at the Borthwick Institute for Archives in York, having been found by his great-niece. In 2017, a century after his death, an exhibition of his journal and theatrical performances of his life were held at York Castle Museum.
