= St Joseph's Church, Newby =

Church in Newby, North Yorkshire, England

Coordinates: 54°17′36″N 0°25′44″W

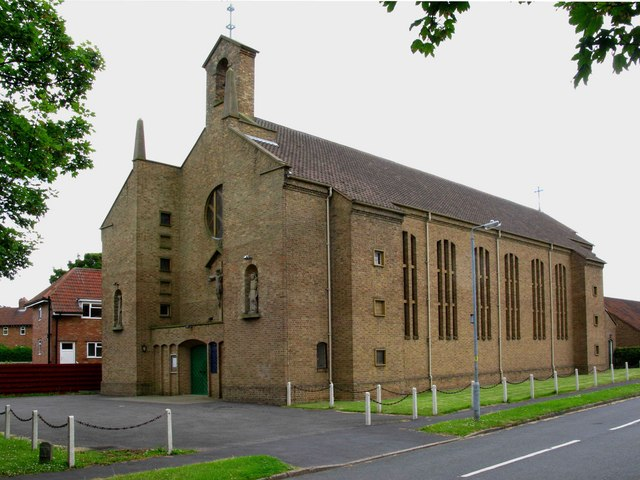
The church, in 2009

St Joseph's Church is a Catholic church in Newby, a village near Scarborough, North Yorkshire, in England.

Local Catholics purchased a site in Newby in 1930, with the intention of building a church. Progress was slow, partly due to World War II, and in 1949 a former British Army building was erected, to serve as a mass centre. Between 1958 and 1960, a church was built on the site, to a design by Francis Johnson. The building cost about £35,000 and on completion, it was given its own parish. It was extended in 1970, with the addition of a further chapel, while in 1993 the baptistery was converted into a chapel of remembrance. The building was grade II listed in 2007. Historic England praises the west front, its design inspired by the work of Enrico Del Debbio and Grundtvig's Church in Copenhagen.

The church is built of brown brick with stone dressings, statues in Doulting stone, and a pantile roof. It consists of a nave, an organ loft, and a chancel flanked by chapels and vestries. At the west end are projecting staircase towers containing niches with statues, square windows in the returns, and surmounted by obelisks. The central doorway has a segmental arch, it is flanked by a blind arcaded screens, and above it is a Calvary, a round window, and a bellcote with a cross. The nave windows are mullioned and transomed, with three lights and arched heads. Inside, the original decoration, furnishing and fittings survive, and the windows have handmade glass, some of which is tinted.

== See also ==
- Listed buildings in Newby and Scalby
