= Marian Cripps, Baroness Parmoor =

British Quaker and anti-war activist (1878-1952)

The Right Honourable The Lady Parmoor
- Portrait of Baroness Parmoor painted by Sir John Lavery (1919)
- Born: Marian Ellis; 6 January 1878; Nottingham, England
- Died: 6 July 1952 (aged 74); London, England
- Resting place: Frieth
- Organisation(s): Women's International League for Peace and Freedom (co-founder); National Peace Council
- Known for: Anti-war activism
- Spouse: Charles Cripps, 1st Baron Parmoor (m. 1919; died 1941)
- Parents: John Ellis (father); Maria Rowntree (mother)
- Relatives: Edith Maud Ellis (twin sister); Stafford Cripps (stepson)

President of World YWCA

Acting
- In office 1924–1928
- General Secretary: Charlotte T. Niven
- Preceded by: Mrs Montague Waldegrave (née Constance Marian Brodie)
- Succeeded by: Mrs Montague Waldegrave (née Constance Marian Brodie)

Marian Emily Cripps, Baroness Parmoor (née Ellis; 6 January 1878 – 6 July 1952) was a British anti-war activist.

== Early life and wartime activities ==
Marian Ellis was born in Nottingham, one of twin daughters of Quaker and radical parents, the colliery owner and Liberal MP John Ellis and his philanthropist wife Maria (née Rowntree). Her twin sister was named Edith. She received a home education and learned to play the cello.

At the time of the Jameson Raid in 1895, she became a secretary to her father, and during the ensuing Second Boer War, she took part in Ruth Fry's projects aimed at helping female victims of the conflict. In the First World War, the Ellis sisters donated money to the suffering families of conscientious objectors and financed the No Conscription Fellowship. After publishing a leaflet uncensored by the government, Edith and other Quakers were imprisoned under the Defence of the Realm Act in 1918, while Marian continued contributing to the Quaker view of war.

== Marriage and international campaigns ==
In 1919, Marian Ellis and the Baroness Courtney of Penwith established the Fight the Famine Committee. On 14 July that year, she married politician Charles Cripps, 1st Baron Parmoor, brother-in-law of Lady Courtney and Beatrice Webb. The marriage was childless, but Lady Parmoor strongly influenced her youngest stepson, Stafford Cripps.

Lady Parmoor acted as president of the World YWCA between 1924 and 1928, and helped to establish the Fellowship of Reconciliation. She was a founding member of the Women's International League for Peace and Freedom and became president of the organisation's British branch in 1950. Lady Parmoor actively served as vice-president of the National Peace Council and argued in favour of admitting China to the United Nations and negotiating an end to the Korean War. In 1948, Lady Parmoor wrote a pamphlet titled The Challenge of the Atomic Bomb, which was published by the Friends Peace Committee. At the age of 70, the Dowager Baroness Parmoor undertook a study of nuclear fission in order to speak out against the use of nuclear weapons.

Two days before her death at her London home, aged 74, she assisted in writing a Quaker message to the prime minister, Winston Churchill, in protest against bombarding North Korea. She was cremated at Golders Green Crematorium, and her ashes were taken to Frieth. Her twin sister, Edith, was also a devoted activist.

== See also ==
- List of peace activists
