= Margaret E. Dungan =

American Quaker suffrage, peace, and hunger activist (1884–1982)

Margaret E. Dungan (c. 1884–1982) was one of the founders of the Women's International League for Peace and Freedom.

She was a suffragette, being one of the founders of the Women’s International League for Peace and Freedom, a vegetarian, and a war tax resister. She began refusing to pay war taxes in 1940, making her one of the earliest war tax resisters of the modern era. She also participated in the Women Strike for Peace protest against the nuclear arms race in 1961, and joined the 1965 "March on Washington for Peace in Viet Nam".

She periodically represented her Quaker meeting to testify at subcommittee hearings at the U.S. Congress on issues related to topics like military conscription.

She was a signatory for the Letter to Mr. W. Walter Boyd from Herbert Sonthoff, March 28, 1967, which stated that the following signatories wouldn’t pay taxes on their 1966 income as a result of their issues with the use of federal funds in the Vietnam War. She was a large contributor to the Friends Journal, a monthly Quaker magazine that combines first-person narrative, reportage, poetry, and news. She mainly contributed in the 1965 issues.

In one of the available reports of her contributions, for the annual session of the Philadelphia Yearly Meeting for the Friends Journal, The 1st May issue had the note that “Margaret Dungan reminded Friends of the possibility of protesting military policies by refusing to pay Federal income tax.”

However this statement was incorrect, and Dungan wrote in to the Journal to specify that she meant only “refusing to pay the military part of the income tax,” and “I earnestly believe that citizens of the United States should support their Government in all its operations for human welfare, and should refuse to support only what violates the divine law of human brotherhood.”

She was also mentioned in the 14 March 1949 Chester [Pennsylvania] Times, about 11 people who refused to pay part of their 1948 income tax. Dungan was one of these 11. On Dungan, the article stated, "Among the 11 taking this stand of protest is Margaret E. Dungan, Providence rd. and Willow la., Wallingford, a school teacher in Philadelphia."

She also was the author of the booklet The prospect of overcoming world hunger (1968).

In the 1st July 1982 issue of The Friends Journal, Dungan's obituary was released, which stated, “Early in life Margaret showed a rugged independence of spirit in becoming a suffragette, a vegetarian, and one of the founders of the Women’s International League for Peace and Freedom. Her unwavering dedication to nonviolence was expressed in many other ways, including the refusal to pay taxes for military expenditures.”
