= Edith Maud Ellis =

English Quaker and activist (1878–1963)

- Born: 6 January 1878; Nottingham
- Died: 27 March 1963 (aged 85)
- Known for: Imprisoned anti-war activist
- Parents: John Edward Ellis (father); Maria Rowntree (mother)
- Relatives: Marian Ellis (sister)

Edith Maud Ellis was a Quaker and was actively involved in supporting conscientious objectors during World War I.

== Early life ==
Edith Ellis and her identical twin sister Marian were born on 6 January 1878, the daughters of John Edward Ellis, MP and Maria Rowntree.

== World War I ==
In 1916, Edith became Treasurer of the Friends Service Committee, set up to support Quakers who became conscientious objectors. This committee had been set up by Yearly Meeting in 1915, to advise men of enlistment age.

In May 1918, the three officers of the Friends Service Committee were prosecuted under the Defence of the Realm Act, charged with publishing a pamphlet titled A Challenge to Militarism without submitting it to the Censor.

In their defence the Friends stated that:

We feel that the declaration of Peace and goodwill is the duty of all Christians and ought not to be dependent upon the permission of any Government Official.
We therefore intend to continue the publication of such leaflets as we feel it our duty to put forth, without submitting them to the Censor ...

Edith Ellis was fined £100 plus 50 guineas costs or three months imprisonment. Harrison Barrow and Arthur Watts received six months imprisonment.

An appeal was held in July 1918 but was dismissed. Edith refused to pay her fine and was imprisoned for three months in Holloway.

== Later life ==
In 1919, Edith turned her family home, Wrea Head Hall in Scalby, into a convalescent centre for released conscientious objectors.

In 1948, Edith gave Wrea Head and its contents to the North Riding County Council for the purposes of education.

Edith established the Edith Ellis Charitable Trust for general charitable purposes. The Trust, now named The Edith M Ellis 1985 Charitable Trust, "... aims to give small grants to a broad range of Quaker and other UK registered charities or Non Governmental Organisations."

Edith Ellis died on 27 March 1963.
