= Maria Rowntree =

English Quaker (1848–1941)

- Born: 5 August 1848; Scarborough
- Died: 3 March 1941 (aged 92); Scalby
- Parents: John Rowntree (father); Jane Priestman (mother)
- Relatives: Joshua Rowntree (brother)

Maria (5 August 1848 in Scarborough – 3 March 1941 in Scalby), the youngest daughter of Quaker John Rowntree, a grocer in Scarborough, and Jane Priestman.

In 1867, she married John Ellis in the Friends Meeting House in Scarborough.

Maria had 5 children:

- John Rowntree Ellis, born 1868, died 1889 of rheumatic fever
- Arthur Edward Ellis born 1870, committed suicide in 1891
- Harold Thornton Ellis, born 1875
- twin daughters, Marian Emily and Edith Ellis, born 1878.

Wrea Head Hall in Scalby was built during 1881-2 and the family moved there from Nottingham in April 1883.

Maria died on 3 March 1941 in Scalby.
