= John Ellis (Liberal politician) =

British politician (1841-1910)

The Right Honourable John Ellis
- Ellis in 1895

Under-Secretary of State for India
- In office 12 December 1905 – 29 January 1907
- Prime Minister: Henry Campbell-Bannerman
- Preceded by: The Marquess of Bath
- Succeeded by: Charles Hobhouse

Member of Parliament for Rushcliffe
- In office 18 December 1885 – 5 December 1910
- Preceded by: constituency created
- Succeeded by: Leif Jones

Personal details
- Born: 15 October 1841 Castle View, the Newarke, Leicester
- Died: 5 December 1910 (aged 69) Wrea Head Hall, Scalby
- Party: Liberal Party
- Spouse: Maria Rowntree (m. 1867)
- Relatives: Edith Maud Ellis (daughter); Marian Ellis (daughter)

John Edward Ellis (15 October 1841 – 5 December 1910), was a British colliery owner and Liberal politician.

Ellis was born in Leicester to a wealthy Quaker family, his grand-father (also named John Ellis) being chair of the Midland Railway Company.

John was educated at a boarding school in Hereford, then in Kendal, following which he went to America with his father to study railway engineering. Returning to the UK, he worked as an engineer, then in 1861 organised the opening of Hucknall Colliery.

In 1867, Ellis married Maria Rowntree, the sister of Joshua Rowntree. They had three sons: John, Arthur and Harold. Their twin daughters, Edith and Marian, were anti-war activists.

In 1870, Ellis formed a Liberal Association in Hucknall, and was elected as the first president of the town's school board, serving until 1882. He was returned to Parliament for the newly created constituency of Rushcliffe in the 1885 general election. In Parliament, he was supporter of Irish Home Rule, and became a committee chairman. He supported the Boers in the Second Boer War, but as his health gradually declined, he became less active after 1902.

In December 1905, Ellis was appointed Under-Secretary of State for India in the Liberal administration of Sir Henry Campbell-Bannerman, a post he held until 1907, and was sworn into the Privy Council in January 1906. A radical Liberal, Ellis was amongst those Liberals who supported David Lloyd George's progressive "People's Budget" of 1909.

Ellis remained Member of Parliament for Rushcliffe into 1910, but announced his intention to stand down at the December 1910 United Kingdom general election. He died suddenly, shortly before the election took place.

Parliament of the United Kingdom
New constituency	Member of Parliament for Rushcliffe; 1885–Dec. 1910	Succeeded by Leif Jones
Political offices
Preceded by The Marquess of Bath	Under-Secretary of State for India; 1905–1907	Succeeded by Charles Hobhouse
