= Lucy Biddle Lewis =

American peace activist

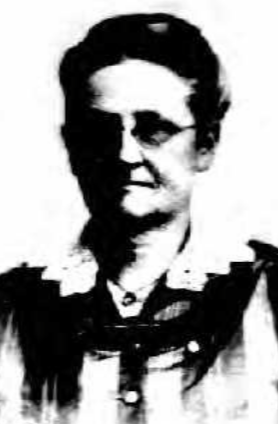
- Lucy Biddle Lewis, from her 1919 passport application
- Born: September 26, 1861; Sharon Hill, Pennsylvania
- Died: January 14, 1941 (aged 79); Lansdowne, Pennsylvania
- Occupation: Pacifist leader
- Known for: Chair of the American branch of the Women's International League for Peace and Freedom

Lucy Biddle Lewis (September 26, 1861 – January 14, 1941) was an American Quaker suffragist and peace activist, one of the American delegates to the International Congress of Women meeting at The Hague in 1915, and in Zürich in 1919. She was American national chair of the Women's International League for Peace and Freedom (WILPF). She helped to create the Swarthmore College Peace Collection, which includes the papers of many notable pacificists, including those of Jane Addams.

== Early life and education ==
Lucy Biddle was born in Sharon Hill, Pennsylvania, the daughter of Clement Biddle (1838–1902) and Lydia Cooper Biddle. She was part of the extended Biddle family prominent in Philadelphia, descended from Revolutionary War veteran Clement Biddle and his brother, Owen Biddle.

== Career ==
Lewis was active in the peace movement, as chair of the women's committee of the American Friends Service Committee (AFSC), and as American national chair of the WILPF, and held other national offices with the league. She also served a term as the international president of the WILPF, from 1922 to 1924. She worked closely with fellow Quaker pacifist Hannah Clothier Hull.

Lewis was a member of the American delegation to the meetings of the International Congress of Women in The Hague in 1915, and in Zürich in 1919. In 1921 she praised the postwar relief efforts of the United States, saying "It is up to America to reconcile these nations. The first thing to be done is to feed the starving people of the small central powers. No people can reason well while dying from lack of food."

Lewis was also on the board of managers at Swarthmore College, and used her many connections in the peace movement to gather enough documents, correspondence, and other materials, including the papers of Jane Addams, to establish the Swarthmore College Peace Collection.

Although she was a member of the Daughters of the American Revolution (DAR), she was included on a blacklist circulated by the DAR in 1928, listing American women who were "pacifists, feminists, internationalists, and socialists." In 1935, she was honored at the twentieth anniversary reunion of the 1915 meeting at The Hague, held in Washington, D.C.

== Personal life ==
Lucy Biddle married John Reece Lewis in 1884. He died in 1898. They had a son, Clement Biddle Lewis and a daughter, Lydia Lewis Rickman; their daughter was also active in the international peace movement. Lucy Biddle Lewis died in 1941, at the age of 79, at her home in Lansdowne, Pennsylvania. Her papers are part of the large collection of Biddle family papers at Swarthmore College.
