= Women's International League for Peace and Freedom =

Civil society organization

- Formation: 1915
- Founders: Jane Addams; Marian Cripps; Emily Balch; Margaret E. Dungan
- Type: Non-Governmental Organization
- Headquarters: Geneva
- Website: www.wilpf.org

The Women's International League for Peace and Freedom (WILPF) is a non-profit non-governmental organization working "to bring together women of different political views and philosophical and religious backgrounds determined to study and make known the causes of war and work for a permanent peace" and to unite women worldwide who oppose oppression and exploitation. WILPF has national sections in 37 countries.

The WILPF is headquartered in Geneva and maintains a United Nations office in New York City.

== Organizational history ==
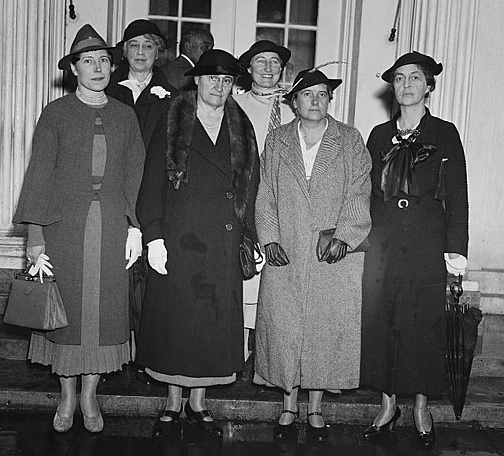
"Peace issues discussed with president, Washington, D.C. Sept. 30, 1936. Delegation from the Women's International League for Peace and Freedom leaving the White House today after discussing peace issues with President Roosevelt. The women plan to campaign during the month of October. In the group, left to right: (front) Miss Dorothy Detzer, recently returned from the world Peace Congress in Brussels; Mrs. Hannah Clothier Hull, President of the League; Dr. Gertrude C. Bussey, of Goucher College; Mrs. Ernest Gruening. Back row, left to right: Mrs. Frank Aydelotte, of Swarthmore, Pa., and Mrs. Mildred S. Olmstead, who just made an expensive trip through the West and Middle West speaking on the need for peace"

The International Women's Congress was attended by approximately 1,200 feminist pacifists from twelve countries, including Minna Cauer, Anita Augspurg, and Lida Gustava Heymann. WILPF developed out of the International Women's Congress against World War I that took place in The Hague, Netherlands, in 1915 and the formation of the International Women's Committee of Permanent Peace; the name WILPF was not chosen until 1919.

The first WILPF president, Jane Addams, had previously founded the Woman's Peace Party in the United States, in January 1915, this group later became the US section of WILPF. Along with Jane Addams, Marian Cripps and Margaret E. Dungan were also founding members. The British campaigner Maude Royden remained vice president of the international WILPF, and other British members included Kathleen Courtney, Isabella Ford, Margaret Hills, Catherine Marshall, Emmeline Pethick-Lawrence, Ethel Snowdon, and Helen Swanwick.

As of 1920 the US section of WILPF was headquartered in New York City. Marian Cripps, Baroness Parmoor, who later served as president of its British branch. Richard J. Evans described the founders of WILPF as "a tiny band of courageous and principled women on the far-left fringes of bourgeois-liberal feminism".

Furthermore, the Women's International League for Peace and Freedom is opposed to wars and international conflicts. The major movements of the league have been: open letter to UN secretary general to formally end the Korean War, a statement on weapons and an international day for the total elimination of nuclear weapons, gender-based violence and women human rights defenders.

=== Woman's Peace Party (US) ===
A forerunner to the Women's International League for Peace and Freedom, the Woman's Peace Party (WPP) was formed in January 1915 in Washington, D.C., at a meeting called by Jane Addams and Carrie Chapman Catt. The approximately 3,000 women attendees approved a platform calling for the extension of suffrage to women and for a conference of neutral countries to offer continuous mediation as a way of ending war.

WPP sent representatives, among them the journalist and novelist Mary Heaton Vorse, to a subsequent International Women's Congress for Peace and Freedom, held in The Hague from April 28–30, 1915.

=== International Congress of Women, The Hague, 1915 ===
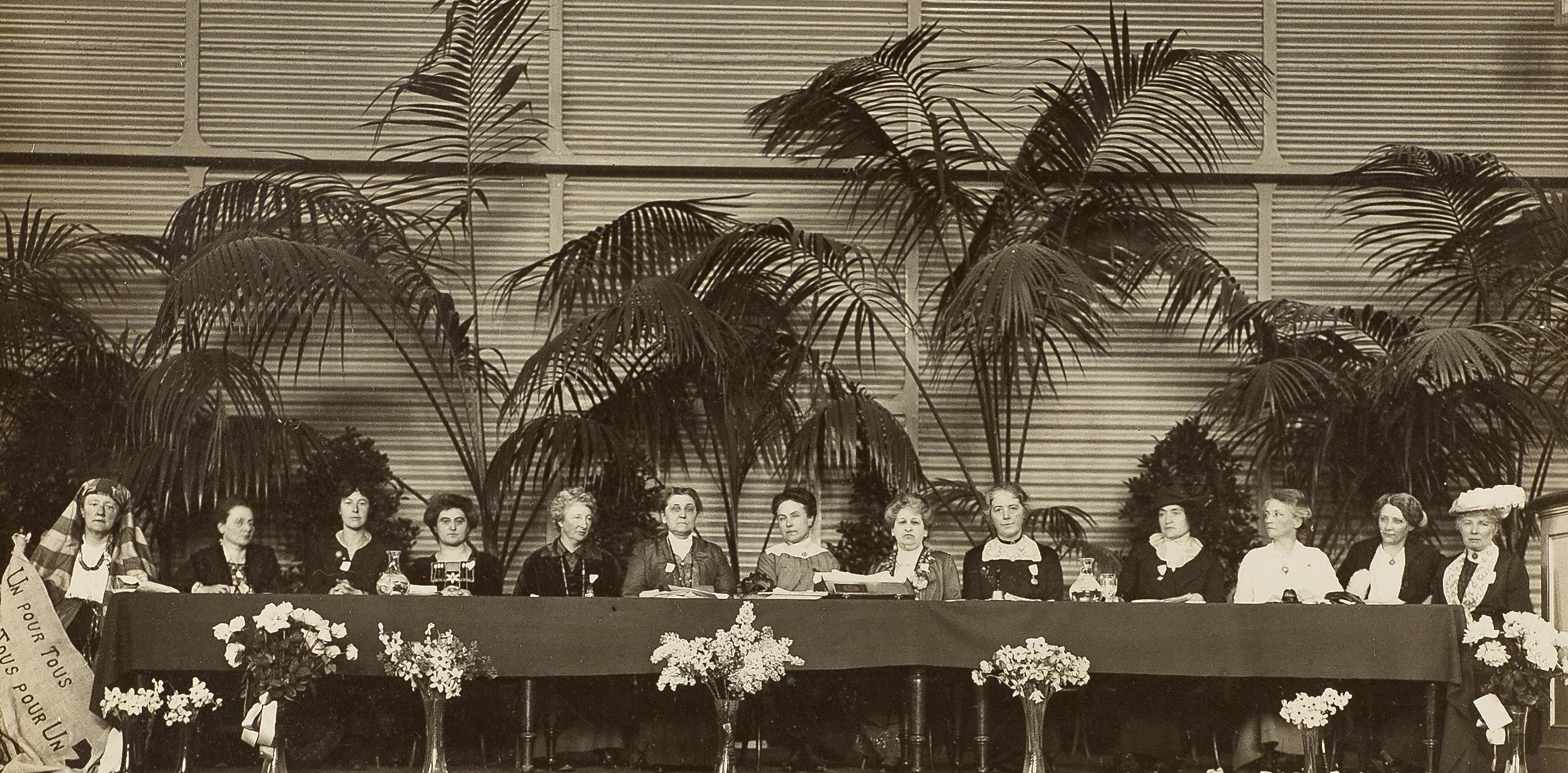
International Congress of Women1915

The 1915 International Congress of Women was organized by the German feminist Anita Augspurg, Germany's first female jurist, and Lida Gustava Heymann (1868–1943) at the invitation of the Dutch pacifist, feminist and suffragist Aletta Jacobs to protest the war then raging in Europe, and to suggest ways to prevent war in the future. The Congress opened on April 28, wound up on May 1, and was attended by 1,136 participants from both neutral and belligerent nations. It adopted much of the platform of WPP and established an International Committee of Women for Permanent Peace (ICWPP) with Jane Addams as president. WPP soon became the US Section of ICWPP.

=== Second International Women's Congress for Peace and Freedom, Zürich, 1919 ===
Jane Addams met with President Woodrow Wilson and is said to have worked out some common ground on peace. However, at their second international congress, held in Zürich in 1919, ICWPP denounced the final terms of the peace treaty ending World War I as a scheme of revenge of the victors over the vanquished that would sow the seeds of another world war. They decided to make their committee permanent and renamed it the Women's International League for Peace and Freedom. WILPF moved its headquarters to Geneva to be near the proposed site of the League of Nations, although WILPF did not endorse empowering that organization to conduct food blockades or to use military pressure to enforce its resolutions. The League called for international disarmament and an end to economic imperialism. The US branch of WILPF grew in recognition and membership during the post-WWI era, despite some attacks on the organisation as "unpatriotic" during the First Red Scare. The WILPF supported treaties such as the Washington Naval Treaty and the Kellogg-Briand Pact, regarding them as stepping stones to a peaceful world order.

== Later work ==
During the 1930s, Vera Brittain was the WILPF's vice-president. Prior to the outbreak of World War Two, the League also supported measures to provide relief for Europe's Jewish community. Two WILPF leaders have received the Nobel Peace Prize for their peace efforts and international outlook and work with WILPF: Jane Addams, in 1931 and Emily Greene Balch in 1946. During the 1960s and 1970s, WILPF was involved in the Anti-war movement and worked to free political prisoners, such as Mrs. Ngo Ba Thanh, a Vietnamese activist and the leader of the Vietnamese Women's Movement for the Right to Live.

Although WIPLF membership is restricted to women, several male peace activists have contributed to WIPLF meetings and publications, including Bart de Ligt and J. D. Bernal.

As long term supporters of the Permanent Court of Arbitration, Inter Parliamentary Union, League of Nations, International Labour Organization, International Peace Bureau and United Nations, they remain a flagship organisation in the Peace Movement.

=== WILPF and the United Nations ===
WILPF has had Consultative Status (category B) with the UN Economic and Social Council (ECOSOC) since 1948 and has Special Consultative Relations with the United Nations Educational, Scientific and Cultural Organization (UNESCO) and the United Nations Conference on Trade and Development (UNCTAD), as well as special relations with the International Labour Organization (ILO), Food and Agriculture Organization (FAO), United Nations Children's Fund (UNICEF) and other organizations and agencies. WILPF has advocates and lobbies for the democratization of the UN, the Security Council, United Nations Disarmament Commission and all other UN organizations and agencies; monitors Security Council and General Assembly activities in order to promote reforms; opposes the privatisation and corporatisation of the UN, especially the global compact with corporations; and advocates for the abolition of the Security Council veto.

== Twenty-first century ==
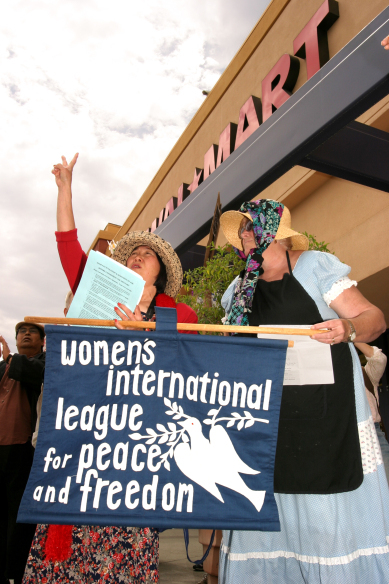
A Women's International League for Peace and Freedom banner at a counter-recruitment event in 2005

=== Mission and vision ===
Work areas

- Building the movement
- Redefining security
- Leveraging feminist perspectives on peace
- Promoting socio-economic justice

Broad areas of concern are:

- Global programs
- Human Rights Programme
- Women, Peace and Security Programme
- Disarmament Programme
- Crisis Response Programme

==== PeaceWomen ====
The Women in Peace and Security Programme (WIPSEN or "PeaceWomen") was founded in 2000. It monitors the UN's work in field of women, peace and security, taken part in advocacy and outreach. WIPSEN-Africa was founded in 2006 by Liberian activist Leymah Gbowee, Nigerian activist Thelma Ekiyor, and Ecoma Bassey Alaga, and is based in Ghana.

== Notable members ==
- Jane Addams
- Emily Greene Balch
- Harriet Connor Brown
- Madeleine Zabriskie Doty
- Annelise Ebbe
- Marie-Claire Faray
- Sheyene Gerardi
- Margaret Hills
- Dorothy H. Hutchinson
- Kathleen Innes
- Aletta Jacobs
- Rosamond Jacob
- Coretta Scott King
- Lucy Biddle Lewis
- Lena B. Mathes
- Dorothy Moulton Mayer
- Selma Meyer
- Sybil Morrison
- Cornelia Ramondt-Hirschmann
- Madeleine Rees
- Madeleine Rolland
- Isabel Abraham Ross
- Mary Sheepshanks
- Dagmar Karin Sørbøe (born 1945), Norwegian physiotherapist and women's rights activist
- Helena Swanwick
- Alice Walker
- Gertrud Woker
- Shina Inoue Kan
- Else Zeuthen

== Congresses and Congress Resolutions ==
WILPF's international records are held at the University of Colorado Boulder on microfilm.

- 1st, The Hague, 1915
- 2nd, Zürich, 1919
- 3rd, Vienna, 1921
- 4th, Washington, D.C. 1924
- 5th, Dublin, 1926
- 6th, Prague, 1929
- 7th, Grenoble, 1932
- 8th, Zurich, 1934
- 9th, Luhačovice, 1937
- 10th, Luxembourg, 1946
- 11th, Copenhagen, 1949
- 12th, Paris, 1953
- 13th, Birmingham, 1956
- 14th, Stockholm, 1959
- 15th, Asilomar, 1962
- 16th, The Hague, 1966
- 17th, Nyborg Strand, 1968
- 18th, New Delhi, 1971
- 19th, Birmingham, 1974
- 20th, Tokyo, 1977
- 21st, Hamden, 1980
- 22nd, Gothenburg, 1983
- 23rd, Woudschoten-Zeist, 1986
- 24th, Sydney, 1989
- 25th, Santa Cruz de la Sierra, 1992
- 26th, Helsinki, 1995
- 27th, Baltimore, 1998
- 28th, Geneva, Switzerland, 2001
- 29th, Gothenburg, 2004
- 30th, Santa Cruz, 2007
- 31st, San Jose, Costa Rica, 2011
- 32nd, The Hague, 2015
- 33rd, online, 2022
- 34th, Cameroon, 2026

== See also ==
- A Single Woman, play
- Anti-war movement
- Danske Kvinders Fredskæde
- Gender and Security Sector Reform
- Jeannette Rankin
- Kerstin Grebäck
- People's Council of America for Democracy and Peace
- Raging Grannies
- List of peace activists
- List of women pacifists and peace activists
- Helene Stähelin (mathematician) — President of the WILPF's Swiss section 1948–1967
- Gertrude C. Bussey — President of the WILPF's American section 1939–1941, and Honorary National President 1960–1961 who wrote much of WILPF's history.
- Feminist peace research
