= St Laurence's Church, Scalby =

Church in Scalby, North Yorkshire, England

Coordinates: 54°17′55″N 0°27′03″W

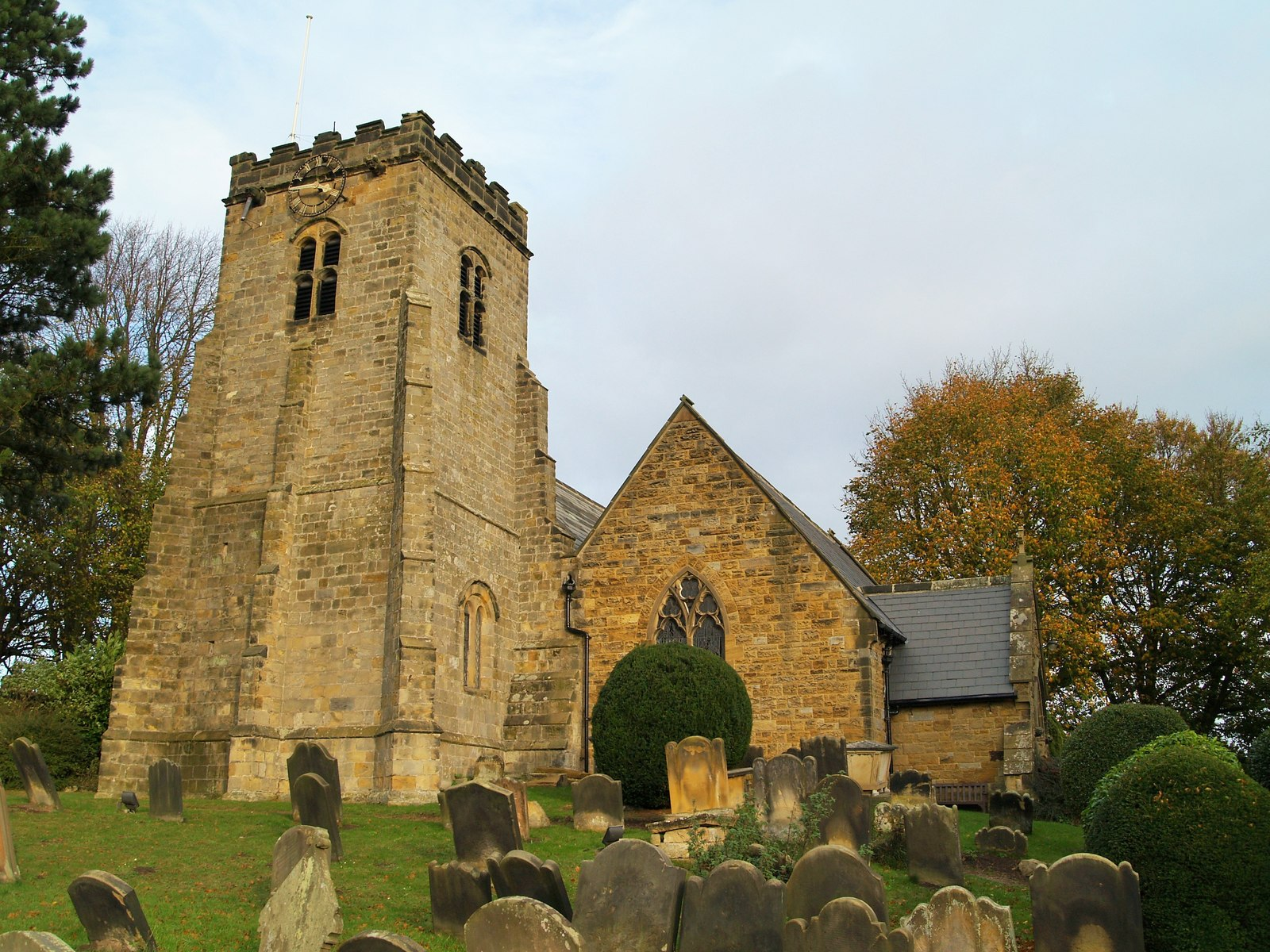
The church, in 2013

St Laurence's Church is the parish church of Scalby, North Yorkshire, a village in England.

The oldest surviving parts of the church date from about 1180, and include the south nave arcade and the chancel arch. The chancel was rebuilt early in the 13th century, and the north wall of the nave was rebuilt in the 15th century. The tower was added, probably in 1683. The church was extended and restored from 1859 to 1860, the work including the rebuilding of the south wall and addition of a porch. It was grade II* listed in 1985.

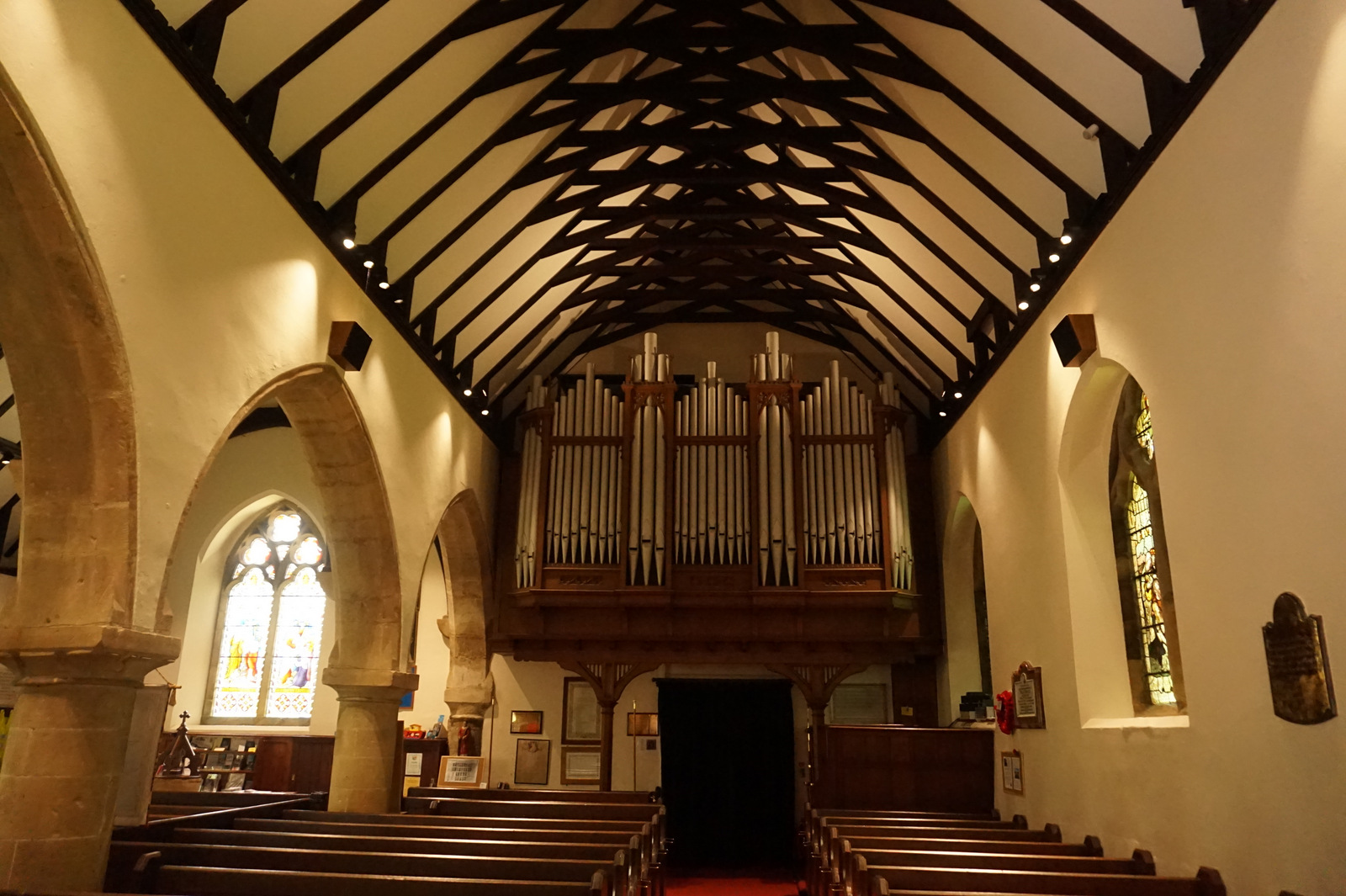
The nave, looking west

The church is built of sandstone with a stone flag roof, and consists of a nave, a south aisle, a south porch, a chancel, and a west tower. The tower has two stages, diagonal buttresses, a stair tower, a round-headed south window, four-light bell openings with semicircular hood moulds, a string course, a west clock face, and an embattled parapet. Inside, there is a stone slab carved with a cross which may be 13th century, 18th-century wall monuments, and a mediaeval font.

== See also ==
- Grade II* listed churches in North Yorkshire (district)
- Listed buildings in Newby and Scalby
