= John Wilhelm Rowntree =

Businessman and Quaker reformer (1868–1905)

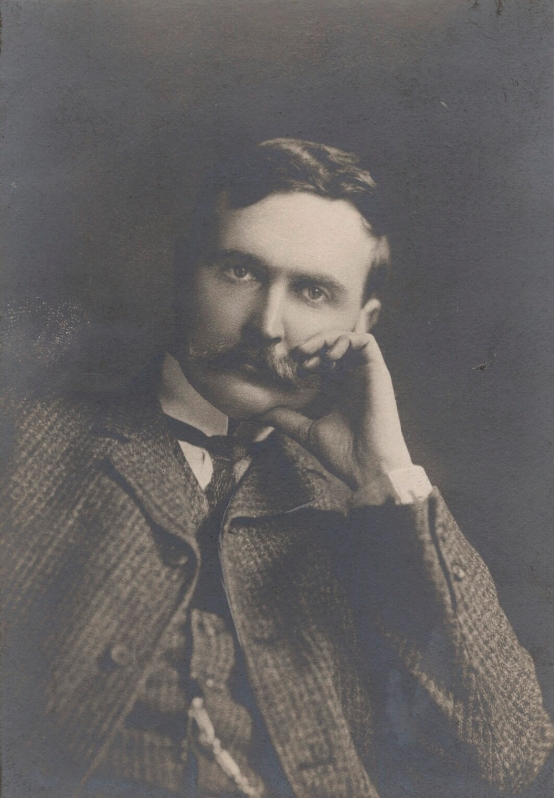
Unknown photographer, 1895/1905.

John Wilhelm Rowntree (4 September 1868 – 9 March 1905) was a chocolate and confectionery manufacturer and Quaker religious activist and reformer.

== Life ==
He was born on 4 September 1868 in York, the eldest son of Joseph Rowntree (1836–1925) and his second wife, Antoinette Seebohm (1846–1924).

He was educated at Bootham School and York and Oliver's Mount School, Scarborough. He grew increasingly deaf, beginning in childhood, which impeded his academic progress at school. He was diagnosed in early adulthood with retinitis pigmentosa. He married Constance Naish of Bristol in 1892.

== Business ==
He was a successful businessman, vastly expanding the already successful Rowntree's family chocolate business. He joined it in 1886 and became a board member in 1897. He established a cocoa plantation in the West Indies to prevent other companies from controlling the supply. By the turn of the century, Rowntrees was selling to Australia and New Zealand and exploring possibilities in North America.

== Other achievements ==
He played a large part in enabling the Religious Society of Friends to incorporate an understanding of modern science (such as the theory of evolution), modern biblical criticism, and the social meaning of Jesus's teaching into their belief systems. He helped establish Woodbrooke, the Quaker study centre in Bournville, Birmingham.

Rowntree died unexpectedly on 9 March 1905 in New York, whilst in America seeking treatment for his blindness. He is buried in Haverford, USA.

== Son ==
His only son Lawrence was killed in action during the Great War. Originally a volunteer orderly with the Friends' Ambulance Unit at Dunkirk, he subsequently joined the British Army and fought in the first tank action at Flers–Courcelette on 15 September 1916 as a member of the crew of HMLS Creme-de-Menthe. He was later commissioned into the Royal Field Artillery and was killed on 25 November 1917 in the Ypres Salient.

== Publications ==
- A History of the Adult School Movement (with Henry Bryan Binns). 1903.
- Essays and addresses. 1905.
- The Lay Ministry
- Man's Relation to God, and other addresses ... With life of the author (compiled by S. Elizabeth Robson from the introductions written by Joshua Rowntree to "Essays and Addresses" and "Palestine Notes" 1917)
- Palestine Notes, and other papers ... Edited by Joshua Rowntree.1906.
- Present Day Papers. Vol. 1 edited ... by J. W. Rowntree. (Vol. 2–5, etc., edited by J. W. Rowntree and H. B. Binns.).1898-1902.
