= Mildred Scott Olmsted =

American pacifist

Mildred Scott Olmsted (December 5, 1890 – July 2, 1990) was an American Quaker pacifist, in leadership positions with the Women's International League for Peace and Freedom in the United States.

== Early life ==
Scott was born in Glenolden, Pennsylvania, the daughter of Henry J. Scott and Adele Hamrick Scott. She was a student at the Friends' Central School in Philadelphia, and majored in history at Smith College, completing her degree in 1912. She pursued further studies in social work at the Pennsylvania School of Social and Health Work, and marched for suffrage against her father's orders.

== Career ==
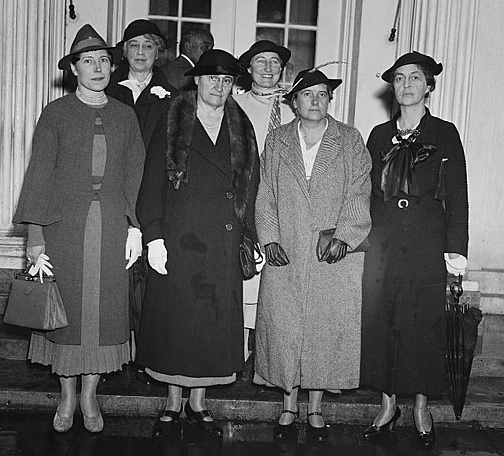
"Peace issues discussed with president, Washington, D.C. Sept. 30, 1936. Delegation from the Women's International League for Peace and Freedom leaving the White House today after discussing peace issues with President Roosevelt. The women plan to campaign during the month of October… [in the back row on the right is] Mrs. Mildred S. Olmstead, who just made an expensive trip through the West and Middle West speaking on the need for peace"

During World War I, Mildred Scott worked in Paris with the Young Women's Christian Association, planning recreational activities for soldiers stationed there. After the war, she went to Berlin, under the auspices of the American Friends Service Committee, to work for famine relief.

In 1922, she took a leadership role with the Pennsylvania chapter of the Women's International League for Peace and Freedom (WILPF), working with Hannah Clothier Hull. She rose to the rank of national organization secretary of the WILPF in 1934, and in 1946 became national administrative secretary; she retired as the organization's executive director in 1966. Her work on behalf of WILPF was marked by her strong interest in working across national and racial lines; she organized conferences of American and Mexican women (1928) and American and Soviet women (1961).

Olmsted was also involved in other peace and women's organizations, especially those based in the Philadelphia area. She helped to found SANE (now Peace Action), served as vice-chair of the Pennsylvania chapter of the American Civil Liberties Union (ACLU), and served on the United Nations Council of Non-Governmental Organizations, and was active with the Main Line Birth Control League.

Olmsted was awarded honorary doctorates from Swarthmore College and Smith College.

== Personal life and legacy ==
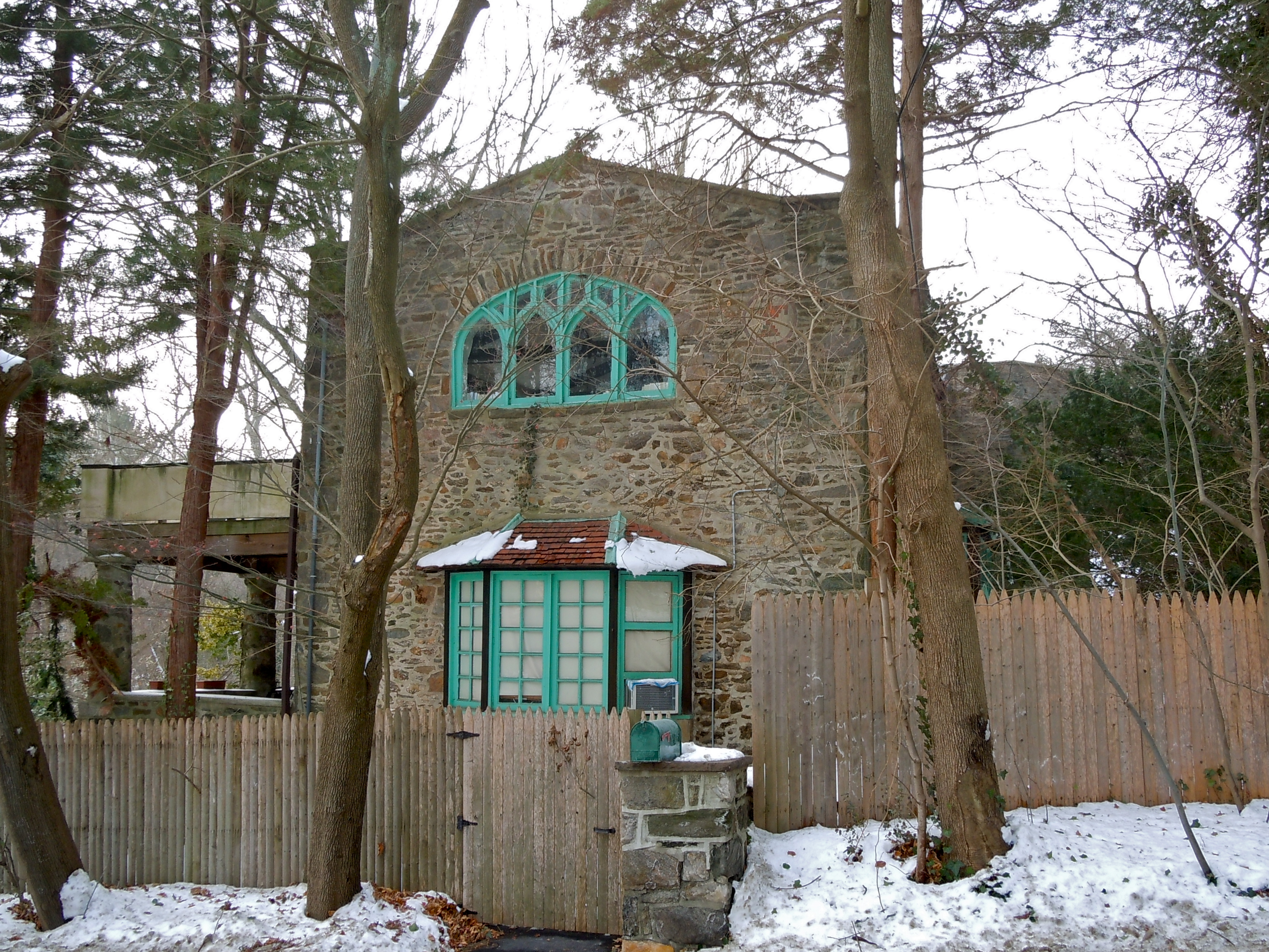
Thunderbird Lodge, where the Olmsteds lived in Rose Valley PA

Mildred Scott married judge Allen Seymour Olmsted II in 1921. Judge Olmsted was one of the founders of the ACLU. They raised three children together. Mildred Scott Olmsted was widowed in 1977, and died in 1990, at age 99, at home in Rose Valley, Pennsylvania.

Her papers are archived in the Swarthmore College Peace Collection. A book-length biography of Olmsted was published in 1992. In 2015 a Pennsylvania Historical and Museum Commission marker was placed outside Olmsted's residence in Rose Valley in her honor. Her home, Thunderbird Lodge, is now owned by the Rose Valley Centennial Association.
