= Dorothy Detzer =

American activist (1893–1981)

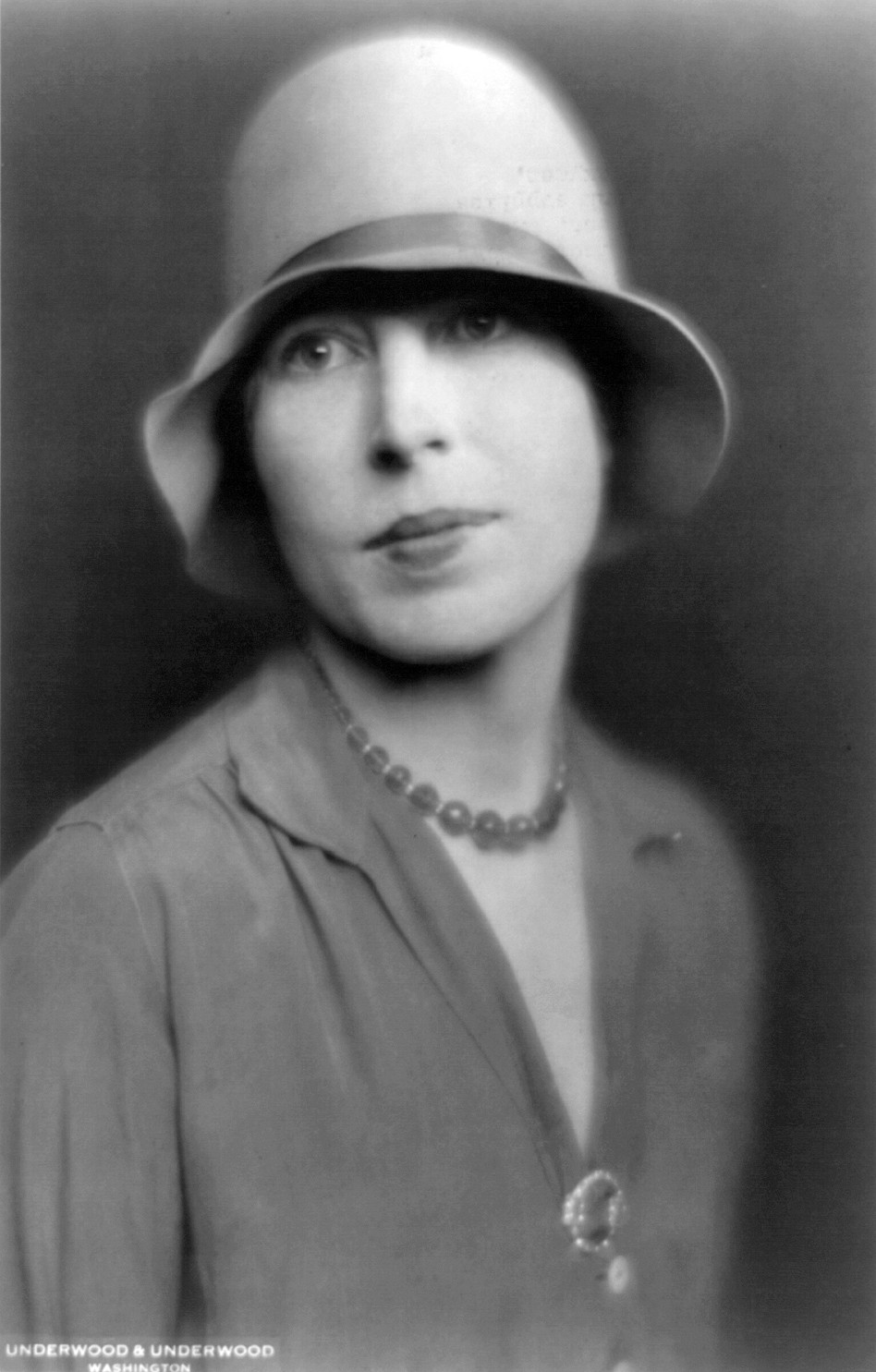
- Detzer in 1929
- Born: December 11, 1893; Ft. Wayne, Indiana, U.S.
- Died: January 7, 1981 (aged 87); Monterey, California, U.S.
- Education: Chicago School of Civics and Philanthropy
- Occupations: Anti-war Activist, Journalist
- Spouse: Ludwell Denny (m. 1954–1970) his death

Dorothy Detzer (December 1, 1893 in Ft. Wayne, Indiana – January 7, 1981 in Monterey, California) was for twenty-two years the National Executive Secretary of the U.S. of the Women's International League for Peace and Freedom (1924–1946).

== Biography ==
As a high school graduate, Detzer decided to forgo the traditional college course, opting instead to travel in the Far East and live for a time in the Philippines. Returning to the U.S., she went to live at Hull House, attending the Chicago School of Civics and Philanthropy while working as an officer of the Juvenile Protective Association.

At the end of World War I, she spent a year in Austria doing relief work for the American Friends Service Committee (AFSC). She later spent two years in Russia as an AFSC famine relief administrator in the Volga valley. Seeing the ravages of war and enduring the loss of her twin brother Don, who was gassed during World War I and died from a lingering illness, convinced Detzer that social work was not enough and that she wanted to work actively for pacifist causes. Upon her return to the U.S. in 1924, Detzer assumed the national secretaryship of WILPF, U.S. Section.

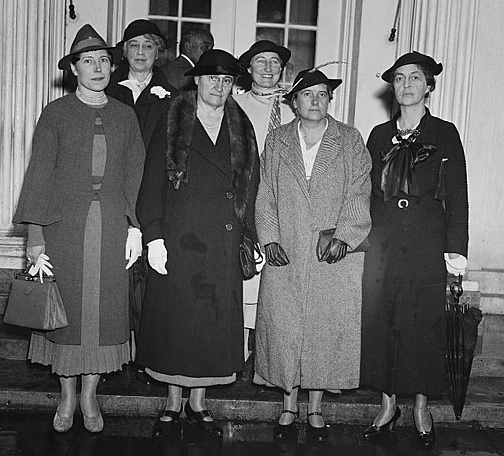
"Peace issues discussed with president, Washington, D.C. Sept. 30, 1936. Delegation from the Women's International League for Peace and Freedom leaving the White House today after discussing peace issues with President Roosevelt. The women plan to campaign during the month of October. In the group, [on the left] (front) Miss Dorothy Detzer, recently returned from the world Peace Congress in Brussels…”

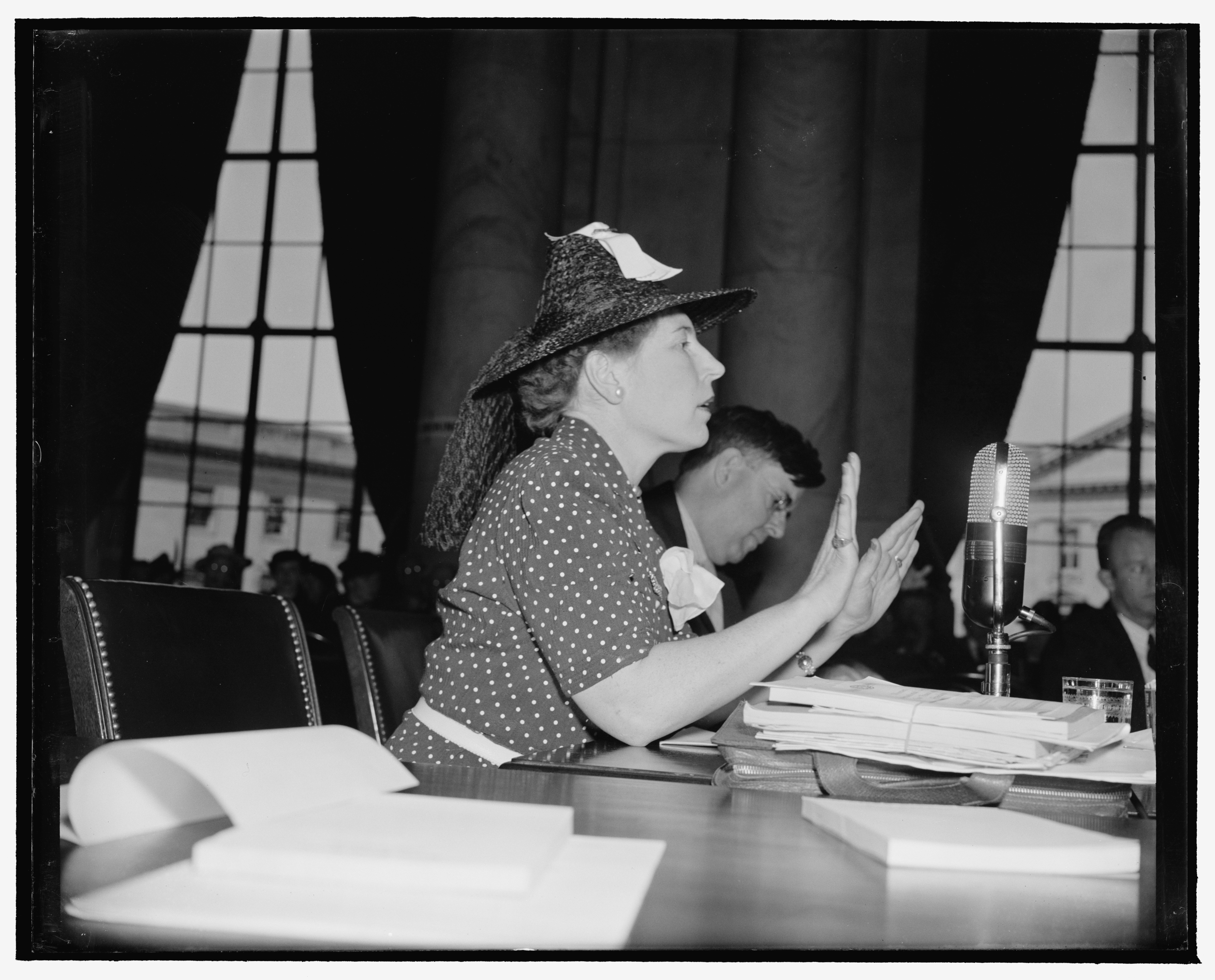
Dorothy Detzer in Washington D.C. May 4, 1939, representing the Women's International League for Peace and Freedom.

Detzer lobbied for the initiation of numerous legislative investigations, notably one launched by Senator Gerald P. Nye on the munitions industry (1933–1936). She was instrumental in focusing attention on the exploitation of African countries, particularly Ethiopia and Liberia, by U.S. business concessions, and was awarded the Humane Order of African Redemption by the Liberian government in 1933 for these efforts. She also secured the appointment of a woman (Mary Woolley) to the U.S. delegation to the Geneva Disarmament Conference (1932), worked for recognition of Russia as a member of the family of nations and freedom for Cuba from U.S. intervention, and argued for neutrality as the U.S. approached World War II.

The events of two decades in Washington are chronicled in her book Appointment on the Hill (1948), which was written the year after she resigned her post with WILPF. She married Ludwell Denny, a journalist, in 1954 and spent the next several years freelancing as a foreign correspondent. Shortly before her husband's death in 1970, the Dennys left Washington, D.C. for the West Coast, where Dorothy Detzer Denny remained in Monterey, California, until her death.

== See also ==
- List of peace activists
