= 1912–13 Rugby Union County Championship =

English rugby union competition

1912–13 County Championship
- Countries: England
- Champions: Gloucestershire (2nd title)
- Runners-up: Cumberland

The 1912–13 Rugby Union County Championship was the 25th edition of England's premier rugby union club competition at the time.

Gloucestershire won the competition for the second time defeating Cumberland in the final.

== Semifinals ==
Date	Venue	Team one	Team two	Score
25 Jan	Skipton	Yorkshire	Cumberland	6-8
30 Jan	Gloucester	Gloucestershire	Midland Counties	6-0

== Final ==
1 March 1913

Cumberland	3–14	Gloucestershire
Try: Oglethorpe		Try: Hamblin, Peckover, Kingston; Con: Hamblin; Pen: Hamblin

Carlisle
Attendance: 10,000
Referee: G Evans (Yorkshire)

J. G. Bell	Carlisle
Y. Smith	Workington
Tom Holliday	Aspatria
J. H. C. Oglethorpe	St Bees & Richmond
J. B. Saint	Carlisle
C. W. Boyd	Carlisle
R. O. Saint	Carlisle
Rev. H.B Ewbank (capt)	Headingley
S Alexander	Kendal
J Wilson	Aspatria
J Harker	Blennerhasset
J. Robinson	Aspatria
C. L. Blair	Whitehaven
T Martindale	Kendal
A Alexander	Kendal

A Hall	Cinderford
C H Kingston	Bristol University
Stanley Cook	Cheltenham Training College
Lionel Hamblin	Gloucester
William Washbourne	Gloucester
A Lodge	Bristol
J Baker	Cheltenham
Gordon Vears (capt)	Gloucester
Sid Smart	Gloucester
A Redding	Cinderford
L H Peckover	Cheltenham
Billy Johns	Gloucester
W Bradshaw	Bristol
J Watkins	Cinderford
N.Hayes	Gloucester

== See also ==
- English rugby union system
- Rugby union in England
