= Blennerhasset and Torpenhow =

Civil parish in Cumbria, England

Coordinates: 54°45′00″N 03°15′18″W

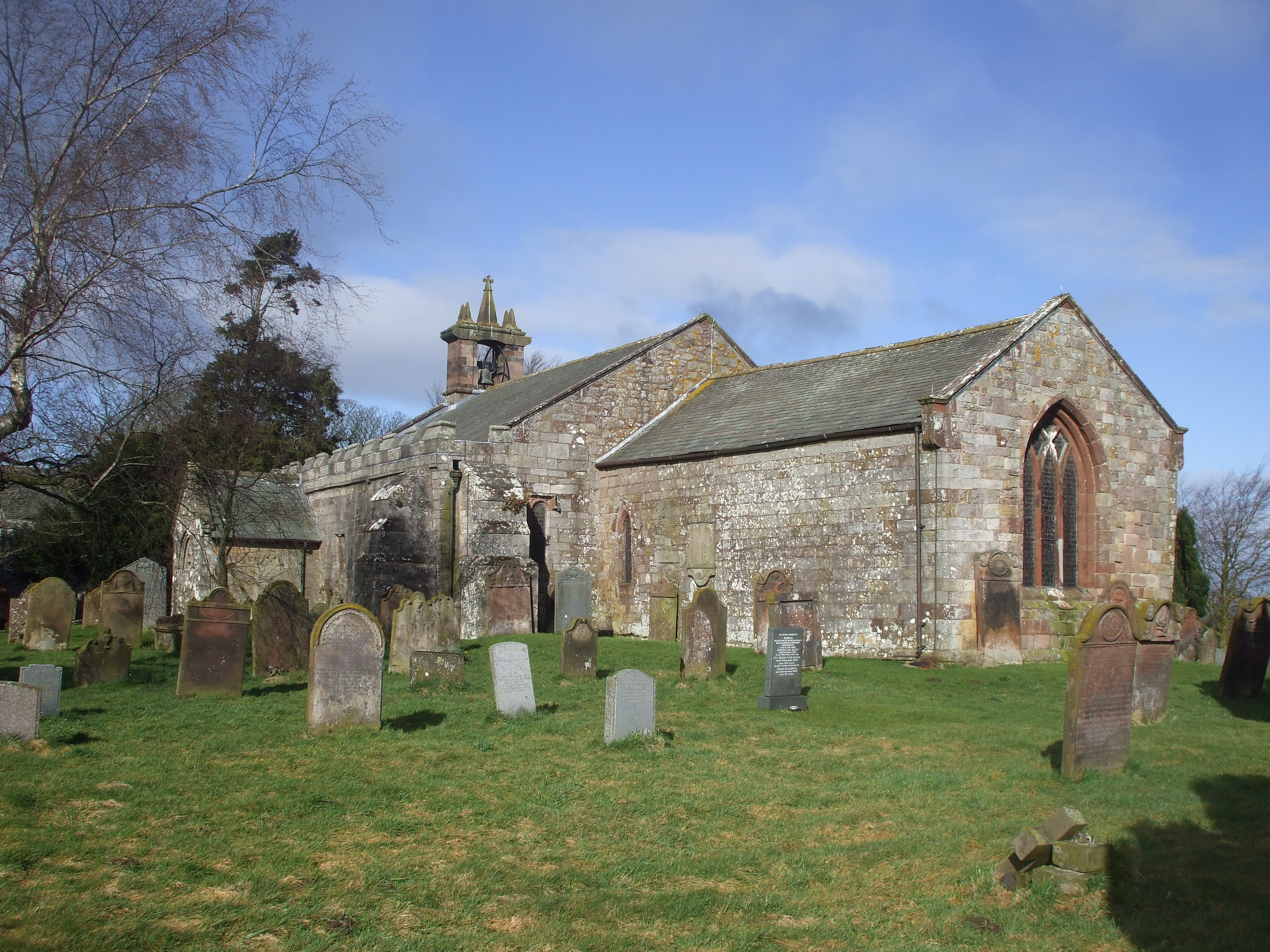
- Church of St Michael and All Angels, Torpenhow

- Location within Cumbria
- Population: 423 (2011 census)
- Civil parish: Blennerhasset and Torpenhow
- Unitary authority: Cumberland
- Ceremonial county: Cumbria
- Region: North West
- Country: England
- Sovereign state: United Kingdom
- Police: Cumbria
- Fire: Cumbria
- Ambulance: North West

Blennerhasset and Torpenhow is a civil parish in Cumbria, England. According to the 2001 census it had a population of 437, reducing to 423 at the 2011 Census. It includes the villages of Blennerhasset grid reference NY178415 and Torpenhow at NY202397 and the smaller settlement of Kirkland Guards at NY187401. It is located just outside the Lake District National Park. Baggrow railway station was immediately north of Blennerhasset.

Location of Blennerhasset and Torpenhow

The local pronunciation of Torpenhow is trə-PEN-ə (/trəˈpɛnə/), rather than the more intuitive TOR-pən-how (/ˈtɔːrpənhaʊ/). Blennerhasset is pronounced blen-RAY-sit (/blɛnˈreɪsɪt/) instead of BLEN-ər-hass-it (/ˈblɛnərhæsɪt/) as would be expected outside of Cumbria.

St Michael's Church, Torpenhow has a Norman chancel arch with a remarkable carving of interlocking human figures, and a painted wooden ceiling.

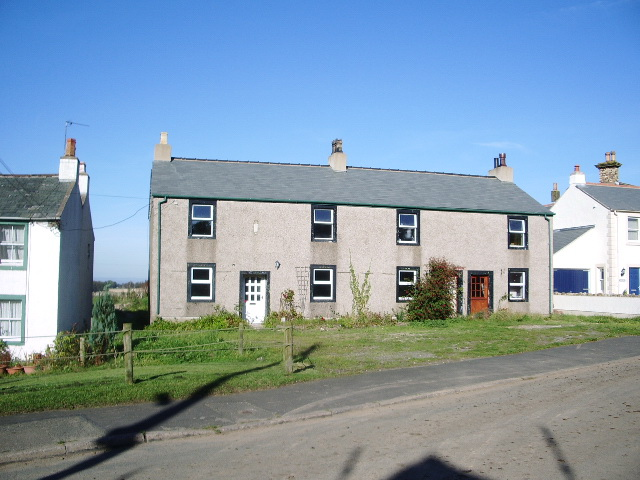
Building at Torpenhow, formerly the Sun Inn

== Toponymy ==
The name Blennerhasset derives from the Brittonic blaen dre, meaning "hill farm", with the later addition of Old Norse hey sætr, "hay shieling". Similarly, Torpenhow derives from the Brittonic tor pen, meaning "peak head" or "end of the high ground", to which the Old English word hōh ("hill spur") has been added. Alternatively, Torpenhow may be an entirely Brittonic name incorporating a plural suffix.

== Governance ==
Blennerhasset and Torpenhow is part of the Penrith and Solway constituency of the UK parliament.

For Local Government purposes it is in Cumberland, a unitary authority area.

Its parish council is Blennerhasset and Torpenhow Parish Council.

== Blennerhasset Rugby Union ==
Founded in the late 1880s and nicknamed "the reds" because of the dark red kit they played in, for a village of around 300-400 residents at the time Blennerhasset were one of Cumberland's strongest sides. Throughout the years, they would have a handful of players play for Cumberland, such as J Harker, who played in the 1913 English County Championship final, and Robert Jackson Hanvey who would represent England 4 times.

In 1912, Blennerhasset hosted the Cumbria Cup final, which saw around 1000 spectators flock to the village to watch Aspatria secure an 8-3 victory over Carlisle. However, it would be the following season that marked the pinnacle moment in Blennerhasset RUFC's history.

For the 1912-13 season, Blennerhasset entered a second team into the Cumbria Shield competition, and to everyone’s surprise, on the 28th of December 1912, Blennerhasset 2nds won the shield, defeating Silloth's 2nds 6-3 in the final at Wigton. Their success did not end there, as their first team went on to reach the Cumbria Cup final for the first time in the club's History. Blennerhasset defeated the previous year's winners Aspatria before going on to beat Keswick in the semi final.

Their final opposition were Wigton, who like Blennerhasset, were also playing in their first Cumbria Cup final. At Cockermouth on the 29th March 1913, Blennerhasset achieved the unthinkable, beating Wigton 5-0 to secure a historic double for the club-an achievement only three other clubs had managed at that time.

Sadly, this would mark Blennerhasset's last appearance in a Cumbria Cup final. Although their second team reached the 1924 Cumbria Shield final, but they were unable to repeat their 1913 victory, losing 8-6 to nearby rivals Aspatria 2nds at Silloth. Matters did not improve for Blennerhasset, and by the late 1920s, the rugby union club had folded.

== Blennerhasset Mill ==
Blennerhasset Mill (at grid reference NY1844041890) is on the south bank of the River Ellen.

== Roman fort ==
A Roman fort is situated on the old Roman Road between Old Carlisle – grid reference NY263466, and Papcastle – grid reference NY109314.

== Gallery ==
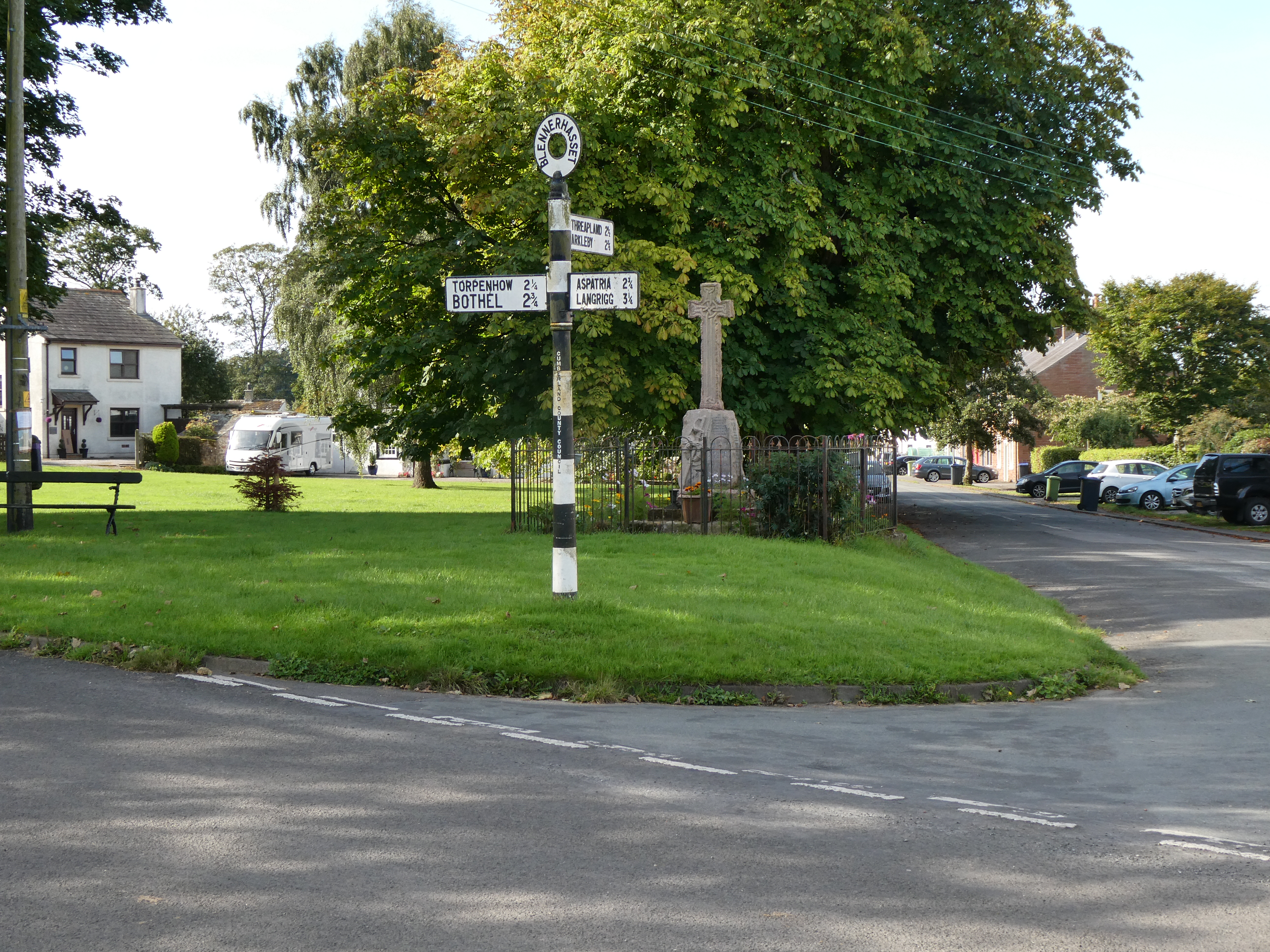
Blennerhasset village green

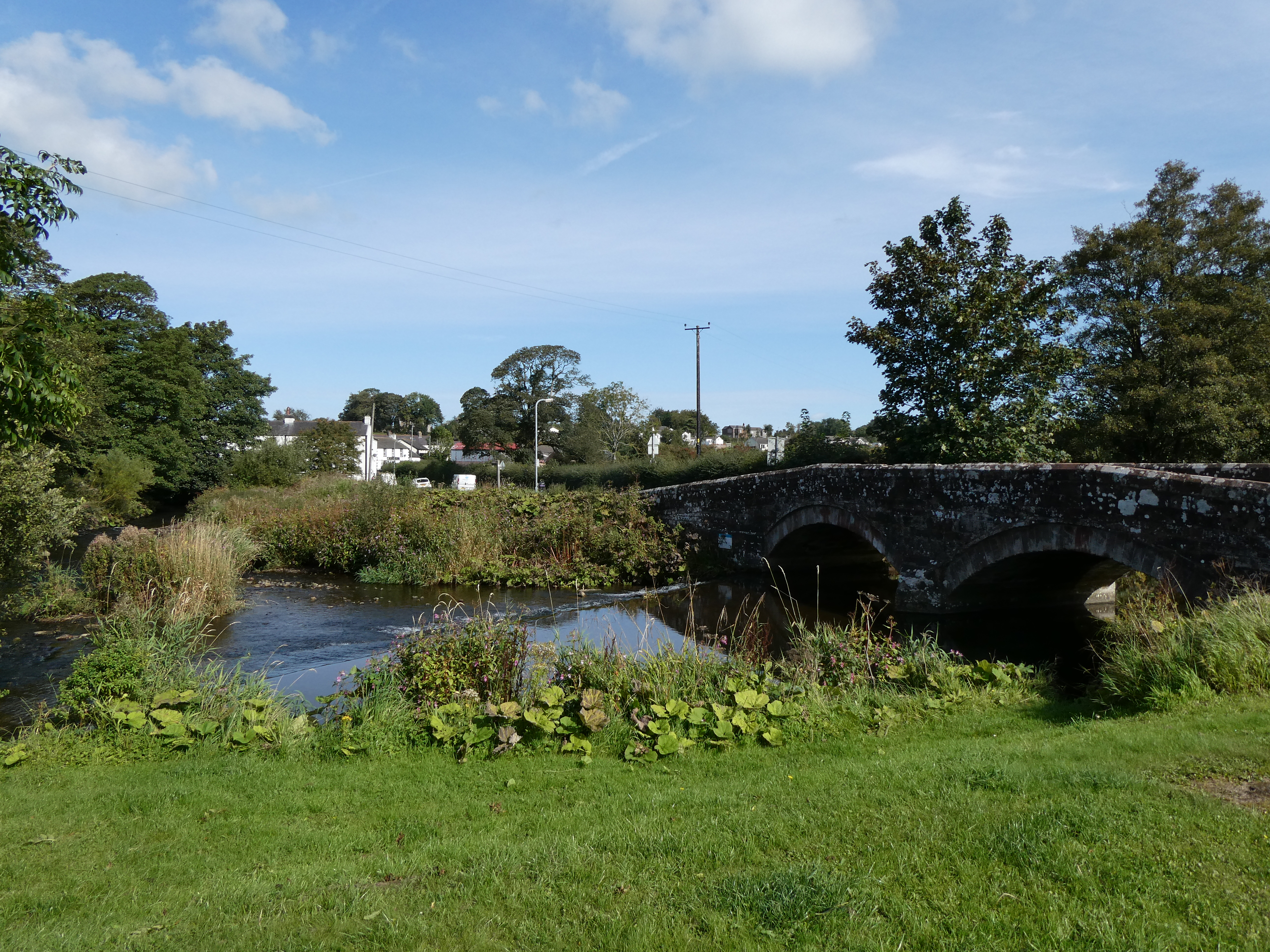
Blennerhasset bridge and weir

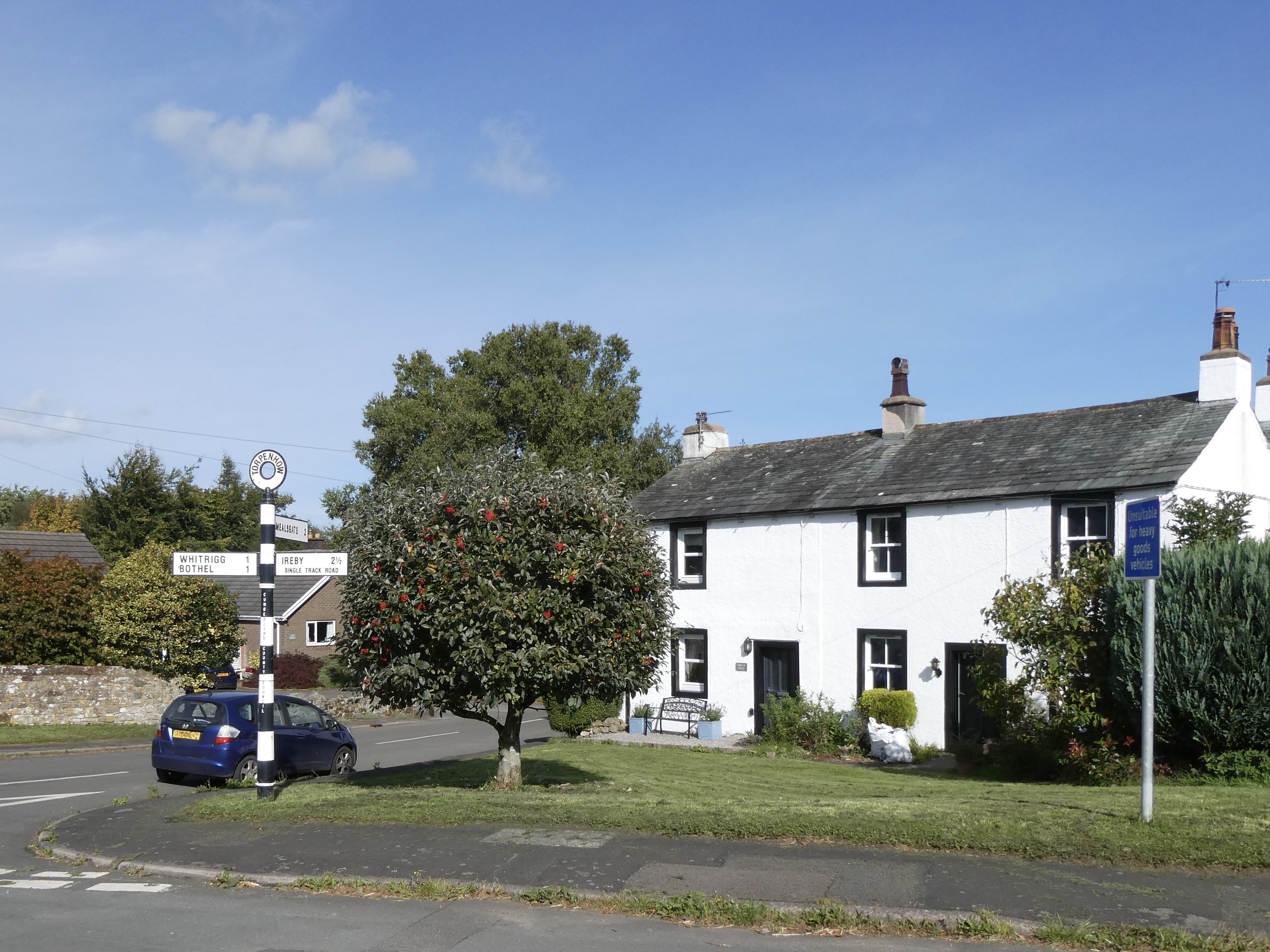
Road junction in Torpenhow

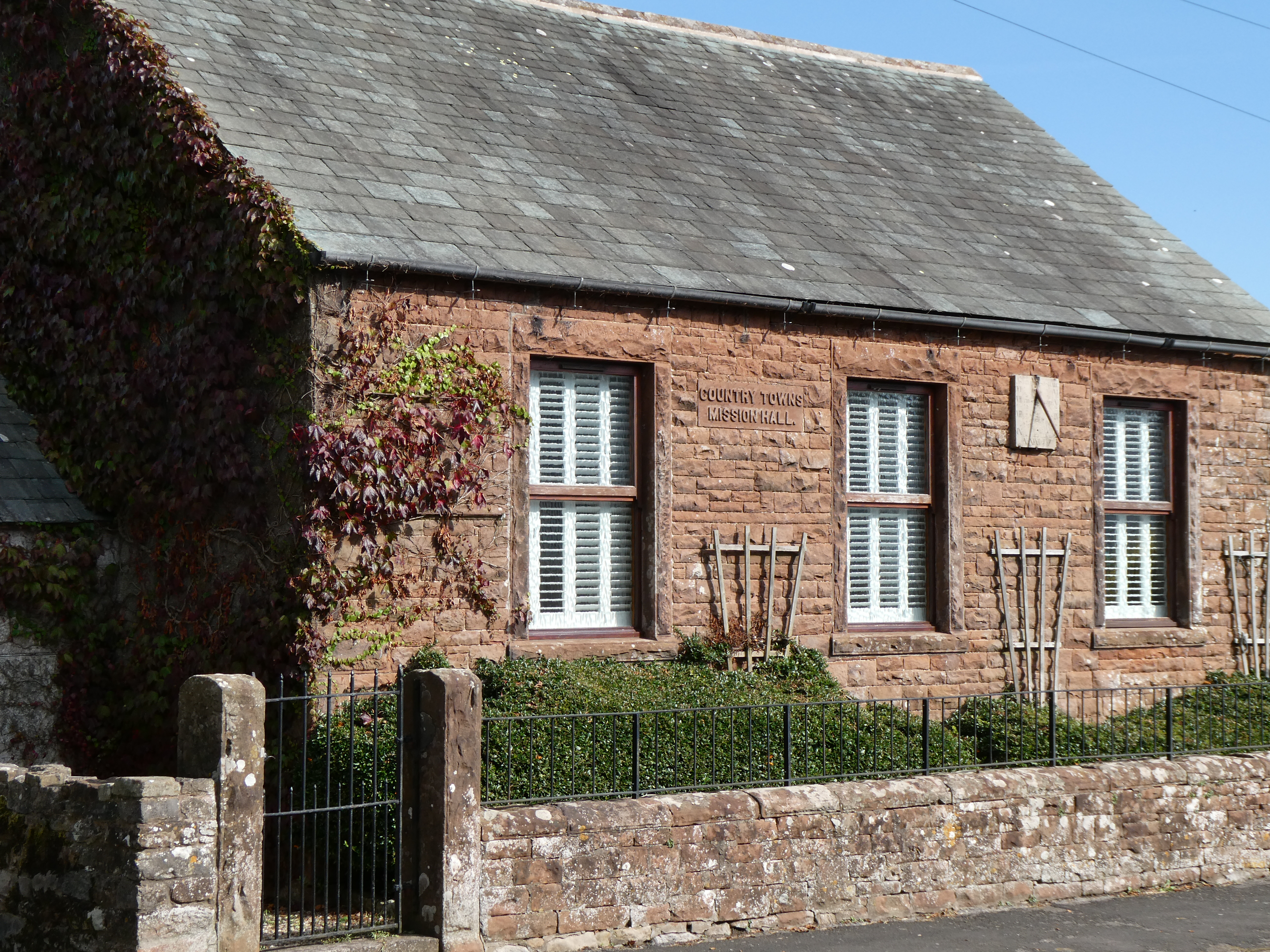
Former Country Towns Mission Hall in Torpenhow

== See also ==
- Listed buildings in Blennerhasset and Torpenhow
- Torpenhow Hill
