= North-West North 2 =

English Rugby Union league

- Sport: Rugby Union
- Instituted: 1987; 39 years ago
- Ceased: 1990; 36 years ago
- Country: England

North-West North 2 was an English Rugby Union league which was at the eleventh tier of the domestic competition and was available to teams in Cumbria and the northern part of Lancashire. Promoted teams moved up to North-West North 1 and as the division was the lowest level for clubs in the region there was no relegation. The division ran for three seasons from 1987 to 1990 until it was cancelled due to a falling number of teams. All remaining clubs in the division were promoted/transferred into North-West North 1 for the start of the 1990–91 campaign.

== Original teams ==
When league rugby began in 1987 this division contained the following teams:

- Ambleside
- British Steel
- Clitheroe
- Lancaster Moor Hospital
- Silloth
- Smith Brothers
- Thornton Cleveleys
- Upper Eden

== North-West North 2 honours ==
North-West North 2 Honours
Season	No of Teams	Champions	Runners–up	Relegated Teams
1987–88	8	Thornton Cleveleys	British Steel	No relegation
1988–89	6	Upper Eden	Whitehaven	No relegation
1989–90	5	Silloth	Creighton (Note: The cancellation of North-West North 2 at the end of the 1989–90 season meant that all five clubs in the division were promoted into North-West North 1, including Smith Brothers, Clitheroe and Ambleside.)	No relegation
Green backgrounds are promotion places.

== Number of league titles ==
- Silloth
- Thornton Cleveleys
- Upper Eden

== See also ==
- Cumbria 1
- Cumbria 2
- English Rugby Union Leagues
- English rugby union system
- Rugby union in England
