= Cumbria Cup =

UK rugby union competition

- Sport: Rugby Union
- Instituted: 1882; 144 years ago (Cumberland Challenge Cup); 1974; 52 years ago (Cumbria Cup)
- Number of teams: 16
- Country: England
- Holders: Kendal (6th title) (2025-26)
- Most titles: Aspatria (32 titles)
- Website: Cumbria Rugby Union

The Cumbria Cup is an annual rugby union knock-out club competition organized by the Cumbria Rugby Union. It was first introduced during the 1882-83 season, when it was known as the Cumberland Challenge Cup, and the inaugural winners were Aspatria. Originally it was open only to club sides in Cumberland, but in 1974, as a result of the Local Government Act 1972, Cumberland, Westmorland and Furness merged to form what we now know as Cumbria, and the competition was renamed as the Cumbria Cup, although the Westmorland & Furness Cup continued intermittently up until 2008. It is the most important cup competition in the county ahead of the Cumbria League Cup and Cumbria Shield.

The Cumbria Cup is currently open to the top club sides based in Cumbria, typically playing in tier 5 (Regional 1 North East), tier 6 (Regional 2 North) and tier 7 (Counties 1 Cumbria), of the English rugby union league system. The format is a knockout cup with a first round, quarter-finals, semi-finals and a final to be held at a neutral venue between April–May. Between 2006-14 there was also a Cumbria Plate competition for sides knocked out of the first round of the main cup competition but this has been discontinued in recent years.

== Winners ==
Cumberland Cup Finals
Season	Winner	Score	Runners–up	Venue
1882-83	Aspatria	1 goal-0	Whitehaven	Sandair, Cockermouth
1883-84	Whitehaven	Walk Over	Carlisle	Noble Croft, Aspatria
1884-85	Aspatria	1 trie, 1 goal-0	Whitehaven	Carlisle
1885-86	Carlisle	2-0	Aspatria	Maryport
1886-87	Millom	1-0	Aspatria	Maryport
1887-88	Millom	4-0	Broughton	Egremont
1888-89	Millom	2-1	Maryport	Whitehaven
1889-90	Egremont	8-0	Flimby	Whitehaven
1890-91	Aspatria	1-0	Broughton	Maryport
1891-92	Aspatria	1-0	Whitehaven	Maryport
1892-93	Maryport	4-3	Cummersdale Hornets	Valentine Ground, Workington
1893-94	Maryport	8-3	Egremont	Lonsdale Park, Workington
1894-95	Seaton	7-3	Aspatria	Lonsdale Park, Workington
1895-96	Aspatria	11-2	Maryport	Lonsdale Park, Workington
1896-97	Seaton	14-0	Cockermouth	Whitehaven
1897-98	Seaton	13-0	Carlisle	Whitehaven
1898-99	Aspatria	8-0	Penrith	Rugby Ground, Carlisle
1900-07	No competition			
1907-08	Carlisle	0-0; 4-0	Aspatria	Cockermouth; Silloth
1908-09	Aspatria	20-3	Silloth	Rugby Ground, Carlisle
1909-10	Carlisle	9-3	Aspatria	Wigton
1910-11	Aspatria	14-5	Carlisle	Wigton
1911-12	Aspatria	8-3	Carlisle	Mecha Croft, Blennerhasset
1912-13	Blennerhasset	5-0	Wigton	Laithwaite, Cockermouth
1913-14	Whitehaven	7-0	Workington	Lonsdale Park, Workington
1914-18	No competition due to World War I			
1919-20	Workington	6-3	Aspatria	Laithwaite, Cockermouth
1920-21	Workington	17-0	Silloth	Noble Croft, Aspatria
1921-22	Egremont	13-3	Whitehaven	Laithwaite, Cockermouth
1922-23	Aspatria	9-0	Silloth	Rugby Ground, Carlisle
1923-24	Workington	12-0	Egremont	Whitehaven
1924-25	Workington	5-0	Aspatria	Laithwaite, Cockermouth
1925-26	Workington	15-5	Aspatria	Laithwaite, Cockermouth
1926-27	St Bees	8-0	Egremont	Ellis Sports Ground, Workington
1927-28	Aspatria	7-0	Silloth	Rugby Ground, Carlisle
1928-29	Aspatria	17-0	Whitehaven	Ellis Sports Ground, Workington
1929-30	Aspatria	8-0	Moresby	Ellis Sports Ground, Workington
1930-31	Workington	8-3	Silloth	Noble Croft, Aspatria
1931-32	Egremont	11-8	Aspatria	Ellis Sports Ground, Workington
1932-33	Silloth	8-0	Egremont	Ellis Sports Ground, Workington
1933-34	Cockermouth	3-0	Silloth	Ellis Sports Ground, Workington
1934-35	Silloth	5-4	Moresby	Ellis Sports Ground, Workington
1935-36	Keswick	10-0	Aspatria	Laithwaite, Cockermouth
1936-37	Aspatria	12-6	Keswick	Ellis Sports Ground, Workington
1937-38	Aspatria	3-0	Silloth	Ellis Sports Ground, Workington
1938-39	Cockermouth	24-3	Workington	Whitehaven
1940-45	No competition due to World War II			
1946-47	Keswick	15-5	Workington	Laithwaite, Cockermouth
1947-48	Keswick	8-3	Cockermouth	Ellis Sports Ground, Workington
1948-49	Keswick	14-6	Carlisle	Ellis Sports Ground, Workington
1949-50	Workington	22-0	Old Creightonains	School Playing Field, Keswick
1950-51	Keswick	11-0	Ellenfoot	Laithwaite, Cockermouth
1951-52	Keswick	6-3	Workington	Foundry Field, Penrith
1952-53	Workington	3-0	Ellenfoot	Laithwaite, Cockermouth
1953-54	Workington	0-0; 9-3	Keswick	Laithwaite, Cockermouth
1954-55	Keswick	6-3	Ellenfoot	Rugby Ground, Carlisle
1955-56	Cockermouth	8-3	Workington	School Playing Field, Keswick
1956-57	Egremont	9-0	Carlisle	Laithwaite, Cockermouth
1957-58	Egremont	5-3	Carlisle	Ellis Sports Ground, Workington
1958-59	Egremont	9-3	Workington	Greta Park, Keswick
1959-60	Penrith	6-3	Old Creightonians	Greta Park, Keswick
1960-61	Carlisle	12-3	Whitehaven	Ellis Sports Ground, Workington
1961-62	Workington	3-0	Netherhall	Laithwaite, Cockermouth
1962-63	Whitehaven	6-3	Carlisle	Ellis Sports Ground, Workington
1963-64	Egremont	17-6	Keswick	Ellis Sports Ground, Workington
1964-65	Wigton	15-9	Netherhall	Greta Park, Keswick
1965-66	Cockermouth	11-6	Wigton	Greta Park, Keswick
1966-67	Netherhall	12-3	Egremont	Ellis Sports Ground, Workington
1967-68	Egremont	9-3	Netherhall	Ellis Sports Ground, Workington
1968-69	Whitehaven	9-3	Wigton	Greta Park, Keswick
1969-70	Wigton	16-6	Egremont	Ellis Sports Ground, Workington
1970-71	Wigton	12-0	Whitehaven	Ellis Sports Ground, Workington
1971-72	Wigton	10-7	Whitehaven	Ellis Sports Ground, Workington
1972-73	Wigton	12-6	Whitehaven	Ellis Sports Ground, Workington
1973-74	Netherhall	6-3	Wigton	Ellis Sports Ground, Workington
	Cumbria Cup Finals			
1974-75	Cockermouth	13-9	Netherhall	Ellis Sports Ground, Workington
1975-76	Cockermouth	12-10	Wigton	Ellis Sports Ground, Workington
1976-77	Aspatria	15-2	Cockermouth	Ellis Sports Ground, Workington
1977-78	Aspatria	13-3	Netherhall	Ellis Sports Ground, Workington
1978-79	Wigton	6-0	Egremont	Ellis Sports Ground, Workington
1979-80	Aspatria	10-0	Moresby	Ellis Sports Ground, Workington
1980-81	Aspatria	21-0	Cockermouth	Ellis Sports Ground, Workington
1981-82	Aspatria	15-3	Wigton	Ellis Sports Ground, Workington
1982-83	Aspatria	22-0	Egremont	Ellis Sports Ground, Workington
1983-84	Aspatria	12-9	Wigton	Ellis Sports Ground, Workington
1984-85	Aspatria	18-9	Penrith	Rugby Ground, Carlisle
1985-86	Wigton	10-6	Netherhall	Bower Park, Aspatria
1986-87	Aspatria	19-12	Moresby	Davidson Park, Keswick
1987-88	Aspatria	12-10	Cockermouth	Lowmoor Road, Wigton
1988-89	Aspatria	21-3	Carlisle	Lowmoor Road, Wigton
1989-90	Aspatria	18-12	Wigton	Rugby Ground, Carlisle
1990-91	Wigton	21-10	Aspatria	Davidson Park, Keswick
1991-92	Aspatria	20-0	Penrith	Lowmoor Road, Wigton
1992-93	Aspatria	17-8	Wigton	Winters Park, Penrith
1993-94	Wigton	19-16	Kendal	Rugby Ground, Carlisle
1994-95	Kendal	12-9	Netherhall	Ellis Sports Ground, Workington
1995-96	Aspatria	20-14	Wigton	Ellis Sports Ground, Workington
1996-97	Wigton	41-3	St Benedict's	Rugby Ground, Carisle
1997-98	Kendal	6-0	Wigton	Winters Park, Penrith
1998-99	Aspatria	22-15	Netherhall	Lowmoor Road, Wigton
1999-00	Penrith	12-11 (Note: The 2000 final score was not clear from the press report available. However, as it was stated it was a low scoring game in which Simon Veitch is stated to have scored 4/5 kicks (penalties) and Penrith won by 1 point, then a 12-11 scoreline is a reasonable conclusion.)	Workington	Rugby Ground, Carisle
2000-01	Workington	11-7	Netherhall	Rugby Ground, Carlisle
2001-02	Workington	33-22	Aspatria	Ellis Sports Ground, Workington
2002-03	Wigton	30-17	Aspatria	Rugby Ground, Carlisle
2003-04	Wigton	27-3	St Benedict's	Bower Park, Aspatria
2004-05	Penrith	42-7	St Benedict's	Bower Park, Aspatria
2005-06	Penrith	31-17	Asparia	Lowmoor Road, Wigton
2006-07	Kendal	21-11	Carlisle	Winters Park, Penrith
2007-08	Kendal	35-25	Aspatria	Winters Park, Penrith
2008-09	Penrith	28-20	Carlisle	Bower Park, Aspatria
2009-10	Penrith	31-20	Carlisle	Lowmoor Road, Wigton
2010-11	Penrith	15-12	Kendal	Davidson Park, Keswick
2011-12	Penrith	27-17 (Note: The 2012 cup final score was not particularly clear in the press report but Penrith are likely to have scored 27 points as two of their second half tries were scored in between the posts while the final try was the result of a line-out, with a successful conversion not mentioned (if it had the final score would have been 29-17).)	Carlisle	Ellis Sports Ground, Workington
2012-13	Aspatria	30-25	Carlisle	Ellis Sports Ground, Workington
2013-14	Wigton	36-24	St Benedict's	Rugby Ground, Carlisle
2014-15	St Benedict's	24-23	Penrith	Davidson Park, Keswick
2015-16	St Benedict's	64-29	Whitehaven	Bleach Green, Egremont
2016-17	Carlisle	29-13	St Benedict's	Bower Park, Aspatria
2017-18	Kendal	18-10	Carlisle	Davidson Park, Keswick
2018-19	Penrith	21-20	Kendal	Rugby Ground, Carlisle
2020-2021	No competition due to Covid 19			
2021-22	Penrith			
2022-23	Penrith	38-5	Upper Eden	Mint Bridge Stadium, Kendal
2023-24	Penrith	40-17	Carlisle	Bower Park, Aspatria
2024-25	Penrith	36-31	Kendal	Lowmoor Road, Wigton
2025-26	Kendal	29-10	Keswick	Bower Park, Aspatria

== Cumbria Plate winners ==
Cumbria Plate Finals
Season	Winner	Score	Runners–up	Venue
2006-07	Workington	28-10	Keswick	Grassmoor Sports Centre, Cockermouth
2007-08	Millon	13-11	Netherhall	Bleach Green, Egremont
2008-09	Final not held			
2009-10	Whitehaven	27-16	Millom	
2010-11	St Benedict's	22-5	Egremont	
2011-12	Keswick	24-13 (Note: The 2012 final score was not clear from the press report available. The press report mentions all tries and penalties but does not mention any conversions (other than several missed), leading to 24-13 being a reasonable estimation of the final score.)	Silloth	Lowmoor Road, Wigton
2012-13	St Benedict's			
2013-14	Upper Eden	19-13	Aspatria	Davidson Park, Keswick

== Number of wins ==
=== Cup ===
- Aspatria (32)
- Penrith (13)
- Wigton (13)
- Workington (12)
- Egremont (8)
- Keswick (7)
- Cockermouth (6)
- Carlisle (5)
- Kendal (5)
- Whitehaven (4)
- Millom (3)
- Seaton (3) (Note: Seaton won the cup several times in the 1890s but switched over to Rugby League in 1898-99.)
- Maryport (2) (Note: Maryport won the cup several times in the 1890s but switched over to Rugby League in 1898-99.)
- Netherhall (2)
- Silloth (2)
- St Benedict's (2)
- Blennerhasset (1)
- St Bees (1)

=== Plate ===
- St Benedict's (2)
- Keswick (1)
- Millon (1)
- Upper Eden (1)
- Whitehaven (1)
- Workington (1)

== See also ==
- Cumbria Rugby Union
- Cumbria League Cup
- Cumbria Shield
- Westmorland & Furness Cup
