= North Lancashire/Cumbria =

English rugby union league

- Current season or competition: 2017–18 North Lancashire/Cumbria
- Sport: Rugby union
- Instituted: 1987; 39 years ago
- Ceased: 2018; 8 years ago
- Number of teams: 14
- Country: England
- Holders: De La Salle (Salford) (1st title) (2017–18) (promoted to North 1 West)
- Most titles: Fleetwood (3 titles)
- Website: England RFU

North Lancashire/Cumbria (usually referred to as North Lancs/Cumbria) was an English Rugby Union League at the seventh tier of club rugby union for teams from North Lancashire and Cumbria that ran until the end of 2017–18 season. Promotion from this division used to be into North 1 West with the champions going straight up and the league runners up facing the league runners up from South Lancs/Cheshire 1 for their place. Clubs at the bottom of the table were relegated either to North Lancashire 1, South Lancs/Cheshire 2 or the Cumbria League depending on their geographical location.

The division was initially known as North-West East/North 1 when it was created in 1987, and had a number of different names since with North Lancs/Cumbria being the longest running. At the end of the 2017–18 season, the RFU had to cancel the division after 19 Lancashire clubs withdrew from RFU competitions across the leagues to form their own competitions. As a result, all Lancashire based teams in this division that wanted to remain in the RFU league structure were transferred into Lancs/Cheshire 1, while the Cumbria sides were transferred into Cumbria 1.

== Teams 2017–18 ==
Team	Ground	Capacity	City/Area	Previous season
Aldwinians	Audenshaw Park		Audenshaw, Greater Manchester	9th
Aspatria	Bower Park		Aspatria, Cumbria	3rd
Bolton	Avenue Street		Bolton, Greater Manchester	6th
Burnley	Holden Road		Burnley, Lancashire	Promoted from Lancashire (North) (play-offs)
De La Salle (Salford)	De La Salle Sports & Social Club		Salford, Greater Manchester	2nd (lost promotion play-off)
Eccles	Gorton Street		Eccles, Greater Manchester	Relegated from North 1 West (14th)
Fleetwood	Melbourne Avenue		Fleetwood, Lancashire	8th
Hawcoat Park	Hawcoat Park		Barrow-in-Furness, Cumbria	7th
Keswick	Davidson Park		Keswick, Cumbria	Promoted from Cumbria League (champions)
Littleborough	Rakewood Road		Littleborough, Greater Manchester	11th
Oldham	Manor Park		Oldham, Greater Manchester	4th
Tarleton	Carr Lane		Tarleton, Lancashire	Promoted from Lancashire (North) (champions)
Trafford MV	MacPherson Park		Trafford, Greater Manchester	10th
Wigton	Lowmoor Road		Wigton, Cumbria	5th

Locations of the 2017–18 North Lancashire/Cumbria teams

== Participating Clubs 2016-17 ==
- Aldwinians
- Aspatria
- Bolton
- Carlisle (relegated from North 1 West)
- De La Salle (Salford)
- Fleetwood
- Hawcourt Park
- Littleborough (promoted from Lancashire (North))
- Oldham
- Silloth
- Trafford MV (promoted from Lancashire (North))
- Upper Eden
- Wigton
- Workington (promoted from Cumbria League)

== Participating Clubs 2015-16 ==
Team	Ground	Capacity	City/Area	Previous season
Aldwinians	Audenshaw Park		Audenshaw, Greater Manchester	6th
Ashton-under-Lyne	Gambrel Bank		Ashton-under-Lyne, Greater Manchester	Promoted from North Lancashire 1 (playoffs)
Aspatria	Bower Park		Wigton, Cumbria	4th
Bolton	Avenue Street		Bolton, Greater Manchester	Relegated from North 1 West (12th)
De La Salle (Salford)	De La Salle Sports & Social Club		Salford, Greater Manchester	5th
Fleetwood	Melbourne Avenue		Fleetwood, Lancashire	8th
Hawcoat Park	Hawcoat Lane		Barrow-in-Furness, Cumbria	9th
Oldham	Manor Park		Oldham, Greater Manchester	Promoted from North Lancashire 1 (champions)
Silloth	The Jim Brough Rugby Park		Silloth, Cumbria	Promoted from Cumbria League (champions)
St Benedicts	Newlands Avenue		Mirehouse, Whitehaven, Cumbria	3rd
Tyldesley	St Georges Park		Tyldesley, Greater Manchester	Promoted & level transferred from South Lancs/Cheshire 2 (2nd)
Upper Eden	Pennine Park		Kirkby Stephen, Cumbria	10th
Whitehaven	Richmond Terrace		Whitehaven, Cumbria	11th
Wigton	Lowmoor Road		Wigton, Cumbria	Relegated from North 1 West (14th)

Locations of the 2015-16 North Lancashire/Cumbria teams
2015-16 North Lancashire/Cumbria teams in Greater Manchester

== Participating Clubs 2014-15 ==
- Aldwinians
- Aspatria
- Blackburn
- De La Salle (Salford) (promoted from North Lancashire 1)
- Fleetwood
- Furness (promoted from Cumbria League)
- Hawcoat Park
- Heaton Moor (promoted from North Lancashire 1)
- Leigh (relegated from North 1 West)
- St Benedicts
- Tarleton
- Upper Eden
- Whitehaven
- Wigan

== Participating Clubs 2013-14 ==
- Aldwinians
- Aspatria
- Blackburn
- Bolton (promoted from North Lancashire 1)
- Eccles
- Fleetwood (relegated from North 1 West)
- Hawcoat Park (promoted from Cumbria League)
- Keswick
- Littleborough
- St Benedicts
- Tarleton (promoted from North Lancashire 1)
- Upper Eden
- Whitehaven
- Workington

== Participating clubs 2012−13 ==
- Aldwinians
- Aspatria (relegated from North 1 West)
- Blackburn
- Didsbury Toc H
- Eccles
- Egremont
- Heaton Moor
- Keswick (promoted from Cumbria League)
- Littleborough
- St Benedicts
- Upper Eden
- Whitehaven (promoted from Cumbria League via Play-offs)
- Wigton (relegated from North 1 West)
- Workington

== Original teams ==
When league rugby began in 1987 this division contained the following teams:

- Calder Vale (Note: Calder Vale would be renamed as Burnley RUFC in 2002.)
- Colne & Nelson
- Eccles
- Fleetwood
- Furness
- Littleborough
- Moresby
- Old Aldwinians (Note: Old Aldwinians are currently known as Aldwinians RUFC.)
- Oldham
- Toc H (Note: Toc H would be renamed as Didsbury Toc H RFC in 1986.)
- Vickers

== North Lancashire/Cumbria Honours ==
=== North-West East/North 1 (1987–1992) ===
The original incarnation of North Lancashire/Cumbria was known as North-West East/North 1, and was a tier 9 league with promotion up to North West 2 and relegation down to either North-West East 1 or North-West North 1.

North-West East/North 1 Honours
Season	No of Teams	Champions	Runners–up	Relegated Teams
1987–88	11	Old Aldwinians	Vickers	Colne & Nelson, Calder Vale
1988–89	11	Moresby	Windermere	Littleborough, Toc H
1989–90	11	Ashton-on-Mersey	De La Salle (Salford)	Fleetwood, Heaton Moor
1990–91	11	Kirkby Lonsdale	Old Salians	Eccles, Burnage
1991–92	11	Old Salians	Rossendale	No relegation (Note: Restructuring of the north-west leagues for the following season meant that there was no relegation.)
Green backgrounds are promotion places.

=== Cumbria/Lancs North (1992–1996) ===
As part of the north-west league restructuring North-West East/North 1 was renamed as Cumbria/Lancs North for the 1992–93 season with promotion continuing up to North West 2 and relegation down to either Lancashire North 1 (formerly North-West East 1) or Cumbria. Initially a tier 9 league, the creation of National 5 North for the 1993–94 season meant that Cumbria/Lancs North dropped to become a tier 10 league.

Cumbria/Lancs North Honours
Season	No of Teams	Champions	Runners–up	Relegated Teams
1992–93	13	Penrith	Windermere	Keswick, De La Salle (Salford)
1993–94	13	Fleetwood	Tyldesley	Smith Brothers, Metrovick, Moresby
1994–95	13	Windermere	Workington	De La Salle (Salford)
1995–96	13	Workington	Calder Vale	Moresby, Carnforth, Furness
Green backgrounds are promotion places.

=== North Lancs/Cumbria (1996–2000) ===
The league system was restructured from top to bottom by the Rugby Football Union for the start of the 1996–97 season. Cumbria/Lancs North was renamed as North Lancs/Cumbria, and the cancellation of National 5 North and creation of North West 3 meant that it remained a tier 10 league. Promotion was now to North West 3 while relegation was to either North Lancashire 1 or Cumbria.

North Lancs/Cumbria Honours
Season	No of Teams	Champions	Runners–up	Relegated Teams
1996–97	10	St. Benedict's	Broughton	Ambleside
1997–98	10	Rochdale	Blackpool	Ashton-under-Lyme
1998–99	10	Blackpool	Oldham	Keswick
1999–00	10	Oldham (Note: Oldham were not promoted due to Northern League restructuring.)	De La Salle (Salford) (Note: Despite finishing 2nd De La Salle (Salford) were demoted to North Lancs 1 due to league restructuring caused by the cancellation of North West 1, North West 2 and North West 3.)	Furness, Millom, Ambleside, Windermere, Hawcoat Park, Trafford MV, Tyldesley, Ormskirk (Note: Due to restructuring of the Northern League all teams in the division aside from champions Oldham were relegated. Furness, Millom, Ambleside, Windermere and Hawcoat Park all joined the Cumbrian League, Trafford MV and Tyldesley joined North Lancashire 1 while Ormskirk joined South Lancs/Cheshire 2.)
Green backgrounds are promotion places.

=== North Lancs/Cumbria (2000–2018) ===
Northern league restructuring by the RFU at the end of the 1999–00 season saw the cancellation of North West 1, North West 2 and North West 3 (tiers 7-9). This meant that North Lancs/Cumbria became a tier 7 league, with promotion to North 2 West (currently North 1 West). Relegation continued to be to either North Lancashire 1 or Cumbria.

North Lancs/Cumbria Honours
Season	No of Teams	Champions	Runners–up	Relegated Teams
2000–01	12	Workington	Carlisle	Egremont, Fleetwood, Burnley
2001–02	12	Rochdale	Oldham	Cockermouth, Netherhall, St. Benedict's
2002–03	12	Oldham	Penrith	Bury, De La Salle (Salford)
2003–04	12	Fleetwood	Rossendale	Windermere, Blackpool, Hawcoat Park
2004–05	12	Rossendale	Tyldesley	Egremont, Kirkby Lonsdale, Aldwinians
2005–06	12	Carlisle	St. Benedict's	Netherhall, Workington, Heaton Moor
2006–07	12	Aldwinians	Blackburn	Trafford MV, Whitehaven
2007–08	11	Blackburn	Rossendale	St. Benedict's, Didsbury Toc H, De La Salle (Salford)
2008–09	12	Tyldesley	Vale of Lune	No relegation (Note: There was no relegation due to the division increasing from 12 to 14 teams for the next season.)
2009–10	14	Wigton	Kirkby Lonsdale	Netherhall, Burnley, Aldwinians
2010–11	14	Aspatria	Fleetwood	Oldham, Keswick, Whitehaven
2011–12	14	Fleetwood	Kirkby Lonsdale	Furness, Millom, De La Salle (Salford)
2012–13	14	Wigton	Eccles	Egremont, Didsbury Toc H, Heaton Moor
2013–14	14	Eccles	Bolton	Littleborough, Workington, Keswick
2014–15	14	Blackburn	Leigh	Furness, Tarleton, Heaton Moor
2015–16	14	St. Benedict's	Bolton	Ashton-under-Lyne, Whitehaven, Aldwinians
2016–17	14	Carlisle	De La Salle (Salford)	Workington, Silloth, Upper Eden
2017–18	14	De La Salle (Salford)	Aspatria	Burnley, Eccles, Hawcoat Park
Green backgrounds are promotion places.

== Promotion play-offs ==
Since the 2000–01 season there has been a play-off between the runners-up of North Lancashire/Cumbria and South Lancs/Cheshire 1 for the third and final promotion place to North 1 West. The team with the superior league record has home advantage in the tie. At the end of the 2017–18 season the North Lancashire/Cumbria and South Lancs/Cheshire 1 team sides have nine wins apiece; and the home team has won promotion on thirteen occasions compared to the away teams five.

North Lancs/Cumbria v South Lancs/Cheshire 1 promotion play-off results
Season	Home team	Score	Away team	Venue	Attendance
2000–01	Warrington (SLC)	HWO (Note: Warrington won 2000-01 promotion playoff by default as Carlisle were unable to raise a team.)	Carlisle (NLC)	The Fortress, Walton, Cheshire	N/A
2001–02	Oldham (NLC)	15-24	Aspull (SLC)	Manor Park, Oldham, Greater Manchester	
2002–03	Penrith (NLC)	25-10	Widnes (SLC)	Winters Park, Penrith, Cumbria	
2003–04	Rossendale (NLC)	24-28	Bowdon (SLC)	Marl Pits, Rawtenstall, Rossendale, Lancashire	
2004–05	Leigh (SLC)	13-15	Tyldesley (NLC)	Round Ash Park, Leigh, Greater Manchester	
2005–06	Wilmslow (SLC)	43-10	St Benedicts (NLC)	Memorial Ground, Wilmslow, Cheshire	
2006–07	Leigh (SLC)	40-15	Blackburn (NLC)	Round Ash Park, Leigh, Greater Manchester	
2007–08	Rossendale (NLC)	20-16	Burnage (SLC)	Marl Pits, Rawtenstall, Rossendale, Lancashire	
2008–09	Widnes (SLC)	41-52	Vale of Lune (NLC)	Heath Road, Widnes, Cheshire	
2009–10	Kirkby Lonsdale (NLC)	13-12	Widnes (SLC)	Underley Park, Kirkby Lonsdale, Cumbria	
2010–11	Widnes (SLC)	26-19	Fleetwood (NLC)	Heath Road, Widnes, Cheshire	
2011–12	Kirkby Lonsdale (NLC)	21-18 (aet)	New Brighton (SLC)	Underley Park, Kirkby Lonsdale, Cumbria	
2012–13	Broughton Park (SLC)	32-13	Eccles (NLC)	Hough End, Chorlton-cum-Hardy, Manchester	
2013–14	Bolton (NLC)	21-18	Northwich (SLC)	Avenue Street, Bolton, Greater Manchester	500
2014–15	Leigh (NLC)	34-26	Liverpool St Helens (SLC)	Leigh, Greater Manchester	
2015–16	Bolton (NLC)	20-27	West Park St Helens (SLC)	Avenue Street, Bolton, Greater Manchester	
2016–17	Douglas (I.O.M.) (SLC)	15-14	De La Salle (Salford) (NLC)	Port-E-Chee, Douglas, Isle of Man	600
2017–18	Anselmians (SLC)	65-14	Aspatria (NLC)	Malone Field, Eastham	
Green background is the promoted team. NLC = North Lancashire/Cumbria and SLC = South Lancs/Cheshire 1

== Number of league titles ==
- Fleetwood (3)
- Aldwinians (2) (Note: Aldwinians title victories includes one when the club was known as Old Aldwinians.)
- Blackburn (2)
- Carlisle (2)
- Oldham (2)
- Rochdale (2)
- St. Benedict's (2)
- Wigton (2)
- Workington (2)
- Ashton-on-Mersey (1)
- Aspatria (1)
- Blackpool (1)
- De La Salle (Salford) (1)
- Eccles (1)
- Kirkby Lonsdale (1)
- Moresby (1)
- Old Salians (1)
- Penrith (1)
- Rossendale (1)
- Tyldesley (1)
- Windermere (1)

== See also ==
- Cumbria RU
- Lancashire RFU
- English rugby union system
- Rugby union in England
