= William Nanson =

England international rugby union player (1880–1915)

William Moore Bell Nanson
- Born: 12 December 1880
- Died: 4 June 1915 (aged 34); Gallipoli, Turkey

Rugby union career
Amateur team(s)
Years	Team	Apps	(Points)
- Carlisle RFC
Provincial / State sides
Years	Team	Apps	(Points)
- Cumberland
International career
Years	Team	Apps	(Points)
1907	England	2	(0)

William Moore Bell Nanson (12 December 1880 – 4 June 1915 (aged 34)) was an English rugby union player. He gained 2 caps for England, versus France and Wales in the 1907 Home Nations Championship and associated match v France. He was killed at Gallipoli in the First World War.

As well as playing for England, he also played club rugby for Carlisle, and county rugby for Cumberland.
