= Cumbria League Cup =

UK rugby union knockout club

- Sport: Rugby Union
- Instituted: 2011; 15 years ago
- Number of teams: 13
- Country: England
- Holders: Whitehaven (1st title) (2017-18)
- Most titles: Keswick (2 titles)
- Website: Cumbria Rugby Union

The Cumbria League Cup is an annual rugby union knockout club competition organized by the Cumbria Rugby Union. It was first introduced during the 2011-12 season and the inaugural winners were Keswick. It is the second most important cup competition in Cumbria, behind the Cumbria Cup but ahead of the Cumbria Shield.

The Cumbria League Cup is currently open to club sides playing at tier 8 (Cumbria League) of the English rugby union league system. The present format is a knockout cup with a preliminary round, first round, semi-finals and final to be held at a neutral venue in April-May.

== Cumbria League Cup winners ==
Cumbria League Cup Finals
Season	Winner	Score	Runners–up	Venue
2011-12	Keswick (Note: The 2012 League Cup featured a 3 team round-robin between the top sides in the Cumbria League that season. Keswick finished top of this mini league after 4 games to finish as League Cup champions.)	N/A	Whitehaven	N/A
2012-13	No competition			
2013-14	Furness	46-22	Egremont	
2014-15	Silloth	35-24	Moresby	Grassmoor Sports Centre, Cockermouth
2015-16	Egremont	25-17	Furness	Wilson Park, Haverigg, Millom
2016-17	Keswick	23-11	Whitehaven	Grassmoor Sports Centre, Cockermouth
2017-18	Whitehaven	20-15 (aet)	Upper Eden	Lowmoor Road, Wigton
2018-19	Aspatria	21-17	Cockermouth	Carlisle

== Number of wins ==
- Keswick (2)
- Aspatria (1)
- Egremont (1)
- Furness (1)
- Silloth (1)
- Whitehaven (1)

== See also ==
- Cumbria Rugby Union
- Cumbria Cup
- Cumbria Shield
- Westmorland & Furness Cup
