= North-West North 1 =

English Rugby Union league

- Sport: Rugby Union
- Instituted: 1987; 39 years ago
- Ceased: 1992; 34 years ago
- Number of teams: 10
- Country: England
- Holders: Upper Eden (1st title) (1991–92) (promoted to Cumbria/Lancs North)

North-West North 1 was an English Rugby Union league which was at the tenth tier of the domestic competition and was available to teams in Cumbria and the northern part of Lancashire. Promoted teams moved up to North-West East/North 1 while relegated teams dropped to North-West North 2 until it was disbanded at the end of the 1989–90 season.

North-West North 1 ran for five seasons from 1987 to 1992 until it was cancelled by the RFU as part of their north-west league restructuring. All non-promoted sides from North-West North 1 were transferred into the new Cumbria division (also at tier 10) for the start of the 1992–93 campaign.

== Original teams ==
When league rugby began in 1987 this division contained the following teams:

- Blackpool
- Carnforth
- Creighton
- Keswick
- Kirkby Lonsdale
- Millom
- Rossendale
- St. Benedict's
- Whitehaven
- Windermere

== North-West North 1 honours ==
North-West North 1
Season	No of Teams	Champions	Runners–up	Relegated Teams
1987–88	10	Windermere	Keswick	Whitehaven
1988–89	8	Kirkby Lonsdale	Rossendale	Creighton
1989–90	10	Keswick	Rossendale	No relegation (Note: The cancellation of North-West North 2 at the end of the 1989–90 season meant that there was no relegation.)
1990–91	12	Rossendale	Carnforth	No relegation
1991–92	10	Upper Eden	St. Benedict's	No relegation
Green backgrounds are promotion places.

== Number of league titles ==
- Keswick (1)
- Kirkby Lonsdale (1)
- Rossendale (1)
- Upper Eden (1)
- Windermere (1)

== See also ==
- Cumbria 1
- Cumbria 2
- English Rugby Union Leagues
- English rugby union system
- Rugby union in England
