= Rossendale RUFC =

English rugby union team

(England) Rossendale
- Full name: Rossendale Rugby Football Club Ltd
- Union: Lancashire RFU
- Founded: 1969; 57 years ago
- Location: Rawtenstall, Rossendale, Lancashire, England
- Ground: Marl Pits (Capacity: 1,100 (100 in stand))
- Chairman: N. Ingham
- President: F. Jelley
- Coach: Andrew Birtwistle
- League: National League 2 North
- National League 2 North: 12th (relegated to Regional 1 North West)
Team kit

Official website
- rossendalerufc.com

Rossendale Rugby Football Club is an English rugby union team based in Rawtenstall, Rossendale, Lancashire. The club runs three senior sides, a colts team, and eleven junior sides. The first XV currently play in Regional 1 North West following their relegation from National League 2 North at the end of the 2025–26 season.

== Ground ==
Having previously played on farmland high above the town, the club are currently based at Marl Pits in Rawtenstall, just off Newchurch Road, located next to the Marl Pits Leisure Centre complex. Access to the ground is by car only with the A56 intersecting nearby Haslingden being the nearest main road. The rugby ground has on-site parking, a club house which can seat up to 120, and a covered terrace next to the main rugby pitch. Capacity around the main pitch includes approximately 100 in the covered terrace and 1,000 pitch side for a total of around 1,100 (all standing).

== Honours ==
- North-West North 1 champions: 1990–91
- North Lancs/Cumbria champions: 2004–05
- North Lancashire/Cumbria v South Lancs/Cheshire 1 promotion play-off winner: 2007–08
- North 2 (east v west) promotion play-off winner: 2008–09
- Regional 1 North West champions: 2024–25

== Current standings ==
2025–26 National League 2 North table
Pos	Team	Pld	W	D	L	PF	PA	PD	TB	LB	Pts	Qualification
1	Sheffield (P)	26	24	0	2	1041	467	+574	24	1	121	Promotion place
2	Tynedale	26	21	0	5	941	509	+432	19	3	106	Promotion play-off
3	Macclesfield (R)	26	20	0	6	1037	725	+312	21	2	103	
4	Hull Ionians	26	17	1	8	801	592	+209	19	3	92	
5	Darlington Mowden Park	26	15	1	10	878	877	+1	20	2	84	
6	Fylde	26	13	3	10	796	664	+132	16	5	79	
7	Wharfedale	26	13	0	13	725	780	−55	15	6	73	
8	Sheffield Tigers	26	12	0	14	686	611	+75	15	8	71	
9	Preston Grasshoppers	26	10	1	15	776	817	−41	16	3	61	
10	Billingham	26	10	0	16	604	905	−301	16	3	59	
11	Otley	26	7	0	19	673	831	−158	12	8	48	
12	Rossendale (R)	26	7	0	19	633	965	−332	14	4	46	Relegation play-off
13	Scunthorpe (R)	26	5	0	21	622	1097	−475	12	7	39	Relegation place
14	Hull (R)	26	5	0	21	570	943	−373	11	5	36	Relegation place

Updated to match(es) played on 2 May 2026. Source: National League Rugby
Rules for classification: If teams are level at any stage, tiebreakers are applied in the following order:
1. Number of matches won
2. Number of matches drawn
3. Difference between points for and against
4. Total number of points for
5. Aggregate number of points scored in matches between tied teams
6. Number of matches won excluding the first match, then the second and so on until the tie is settled
