= Regional 2 North =

Level six rugby union league in England

- Current season or competition: 2025–26 Regional 2 North
- Sport: Rugby union
- Instituted: 2022
- Number of teams: 12
- Country: England
- Holders: Middlesbrough (2024–25)
- Most titles: Penrith; Percy Park; Middlesbrough (1 title)
- Website: Northern Division

Regional 2 North is a level six league in the English rugby union system, with the twelve teams drawn from across North East England and Cumbria. The other level six leagues in the Northern Division are Regional 2 North East for teams in Yorkshire, Regional 2 North West for teams in Lancashire, Greater Manchester and Merseyside. It was created as a product of the 2022 Adult Competition Review. The current champions are Middlesbrough.

== Structure ==
The league consists of twelve teams who play the others on a home and away basis, to make a total of 22 matches each. The champions are promoted to Regional 1 North East or Regional 1 North West and the bottom sides are relegated to Counties 1 Cumbria or Counties 1 Durham & Northumberland depending on the location of the teams.

The results of the matches contribute points to the league as follows:

- 4 points are awarded for a win
- 2 points are awarded for a draw
- 0 points are awarded for a loss, however
- 1 losing (bonus) point is awarded to a team that loses a match by 7 points or fewer
- 1 additional (bonus) point is awarded to a team scoring 4 tries or more in a match.

== 2026–27 ==
Departing were the champions Northern promoted to Regional 1 North East while Aspatria (11th) and Wigton (12th) were relegated to Counties 1 Cumbria.

Team	Ground	Capacity	City/Area	Previous season
Consett	Amethyst Park		Consett, County Durham	Runners-up
Durham City	Hollow Drift	3,000 (500 seats)	Durham, County Durham	9th
Guisborough	Belmangate		Guisborough, North Yorkshire	10th
Keswick	Davidson Park		Keswick, Cumbria	4th
Morpeth	Grange House Field	1,000	Morpeth, Northumberland	8th
Novocastrians	Sutherland Park	1,150	Benton, Newcastle upon Tyne, Tyne and Wear	Promoted from Counties 1 D&N (champions)
Penrith	Winters Park		Penrith, Cumbria	Relegated from Regional 1 North East (11th)
Percy Park	Preston Avenue		North Shields, Tyne and Wear	3rd
Ryton	Main Road		Ryton, Tyne and Wear	Promoted from Counties 1 D&N (runners-up)
Sunderland	Ashbrooke Sports Club		Ashbrooke, Sunderland, Tyne and Wear	5th
Upper Eden	Pennine Park		Kirkby Stephen, Cumbria	6th
West Hartlepool	Brinkburn	2,000 (76 seats)	Hartlepool, County Durham	7th

Locations of the 2026–27 Regional 2 North teams in Northumberland, Tyne & Wear, Durham & North Yorkshire
Locations of the 2026-27 Regional 2 North teams in Cumbria

== 2025–26 ==
Departing were the champions Middlesbrough promoted to Regional 1 North East while Carlisle (11th) and Kirkby Lonsdale (12th) were relegated to Counties 1 Cumbria.

Team	Ground	Capacity	City/Area	Previous season
Aspatria	Bower Park	3,000 (300 seats)	Aspatria, Cumbria	8th
Consett	Amethyst Park		Consett, County Durham	6th
Durham City	Hollow Drift	3,000 (500 seats)	Durham, County Durham	5th
Guisborough	Belmangate		Guisborough, North Yorkshire	10th
Keswick	Davidson Park		Keswick, Cumbria	7th
Morpeth	Grange House Field	1,000	Morpeth, Northumberland	3rd
Northern	McCracken Park	1,000	Gosforth, Newcastle upon Tyne, Tyne and Wear	2nd
Percy Park	Preston Avenue		North Shields, Tyne and Wear	Relegated from Regional 1 North East (11th)
Sunderland	Ashbrooke Sports Club		Ashbrooke, Sunderland, Tyne and Wear	Promoted from Counties 1 D&N
Upper Eden	Pennine Park		Kirkby Stephen, Cumbria	9th
West Hartlepool	Brinkburn	2,000 (76 seats)	Hartlepool, County Durham	4th
Wigton	Lowmoor Road		Wigton, Cumbria	Promoted from Counties 1 Cumbria (champions)

Locations of the 2025–26 Regional 2 North teams in Northumberland, Tyne & Wear, Durham & North Yorkshire
Locations of the 2025–26 Regional 2 North teams in Cumbria

=== League table ===
Regional 2 North 2025–26
	Team	Played	Won	Drawn	Lost	Points for	Points against	Points diff	Try bonus	Loss bonus	Points
1	Northern (P)	22	21	0	1	814	310	504	17	0	101
2	Consett	22	14	0	8	781	629	152	17	4	77
3	Percy Park	22	12	1	9	673	622	51	13	3	66
4	Keswick	22	12	0	10	622	511	111	11	5	64
5	Sunderland	22	12	0	10	542	473	69	10	6	64
6	Upper Eden	22	11	0	11	615	530	85	14	4	62
7	West Hartlepool	22	10	1	11	676	660	16	16	3	61
8	Morpeth	22	11	1	10	592	566	26	11	1	58
9	Durham City	22	9	0	13	595	557	38	12	5	53
10	Guisborough	22	10	2	10	487	579	−92	6	0	50
11	Aspatria	22	6	1	15	419	683	−264	6	2	34
12	Wigton (R)	22	1	0	21	335	1031	−696	4	2	10
If teams are level at any stage, tiebreakers are applied in the following order: 1. Number of matches won 2. Number of draws 3. Difference between points for and against 4. Total number of points for 5. Aggregate number of points scored in matches between tied teams 6. Number of matches won excluding the first match, then the second and so on until the tie is settled
Mint background is the promotion place (1st); Green background is the promotion play-off places (2nd–5th); Pink background are the relegation play-off places (10th–11th); Salmon background is the relegation place (12th); Updated: 12 May 2026; Source:

=== Play-offs ===
Relegation play-off

The 10th and 11th placed teams held a play-off, with the losing team relegated.

25 April 2026
14:30

Guisborough	33 – 14	Aspatria (10th)

Belmangate, Guisborough

== 2024–25 ==
Departing were the champions Percy Park, promoted to Regional 1 North East whilst Cockermouth were relegated to Counties 1 Cumbria and Stockton relegated to Counties 1 Durham/Northumberland. Replacing them were Carlisle promoted from Counties 1 Cumbria, Guisborough promoted from Counties 1 Durham/Northumberland and Kirkby Lonsdale joining on a level transfer from Regional 2 North West.

Team	Ground	Capacity	City/Area	Previous season
Aspatria	Bower Park	3,000 (300 seats)	Aspatria, Cumbria	5th
Carlisle	Rugby Ground, Warwick Road	1,500 (250 seats)	Carlisle, Cumbria	Promoted from Counties 1 Cumbria
Consett	Amethyst Park		Consett, County Durham	8th
Durham City	Hollow Drift	3,000 (500 seats)	Durham, County Durham	4th
Guisborough	Belmangate		Guisborough, North Yorkshire	Promoted from Counties 1 D&N
Keswick	Davidson Park		Keswick, Cumbria	10th
Kirkby Lonsdale	Underley Park		Kirkby Lonsdale, Cumbria	Level transfer from Regional 2 North West (11th)
Middlesbrough	Acklam Park	5,000 (159 seats)	Acklam, Middlesbrough, North Yorkshire	3rd
Morpeth	Grange House Field	1,000	Morpeth, Northumberland	7th
Northern	McCracken Park	1,000	Gosforth, Newcastle upon Tyne, Tyne and Wear	2nd
Upper Eden	Pennine Park		Kirkby Stephen, Cumbria	9th
West Hartlepool	Brinkburn	2,000 (76 seats)	Hartlepool, County Durham	6th

Locations of the 2024–25 Regional 2 North teams in Northumberland, Tyne & Wear, Durham & North Yorkshire
Locations of the 2024–25 Regional 2 North teams in Cumbria

=== League table ===
Regional 2 North 2024–25
	Team	Played	Won	Drawn	Lost	Points for	Points against	Points diff	Try bonus	Loss bonus	Points
1	Middlesbrough (P)	22	20	0	2	883	334	549	16	2	98
2	Northern	22	20	0	2	842	308	534	18	0	98
3	Morpeth	22	16	0	5	652	417	235	15	4	83
4	West Hartlepool	22	13	0	9	772	533	239	15	3	70
5	Durham City	22	12	1	9	641	651	−10	16	2	68
6	Consett	22	11	0	11	589	647	−58	11	4	59
7	Keswick	22	11	0	11	526	531	−5	8	5	57
8	Aspatria	22	7	0	15	420	621	−201	5	3	36
9	Upper Eden	22	7	0	15	411	661	−250	7	1	36
10	Guisborough	22	6	0	16	425	701	−276	8	4	36
11	Carlisle (R)	22	5	1	16	480	795	−315	12	2	36
12	Kirkby Lonsdale (R)	22	3	0	19	288	730	−442	2	1	15
If teams are level at any stage, tiebreakers are applied in the following order: 1. Number of matches won 2. Number of draws 3. Difference between points for and against 4. Total number of points for 5. Aggregate number of points scored in matches between tied teams 6. Number of matches won excluding the first match, then the second and so on until the tie is settled
Green background is the promotion place. Pink background are the relegation places. Updated: 4 September 2025; Source:

== 2023–24 ==
Departing were Penrith, promoted to Regional 1 North West, whilst Carlisle were relegated to Counties 1 Cumbria and South Shields Westoe relegated to Counties 1 Durham/Northumberland. Replacing them were Cockermouth and Upper Eden, promoted from Counties 1 Cumbria, and West Hartlepool promoted from Counties 1 Durham/Northumberland

Team	Ground	Capacity	City/Area	Previous season
Aspatria	Bower Park	3,000 (300 seats)	Aspatria, Cumbria	7th
Cockermouth	Grassmoor Sports Centre		Cockermouth, Cumbria	Promoted from Counties 1 Cumbria
Consett	Amethyst Park		Consett, County Durham	8th
Durham City	Hollow Drift	3,000 (500 seats)	Durham, County Durham	6th
Keswick	Davidson Park		Keswick, Cumbria	9th
Middlesbrough	Acklam Park	5,000 (159 seats)	Acklam, Middlesbrough, North Yorkshire	5th
Morpeth	Grange House Field	1,000	Morpeth, Northumberland	2nd
Northern	McCracken Park	1,000	Gosforth, Newcastle upon Tyne, Tyne and Wear	3rd
Percy Park	Preston Avenue		North Shields, Tyne and Wear	4th
Stockton	The Grangefield Ground		Stockton-on-Tees, County Durham	10th
Upper Eden	Pennine Park		Kirkby Stephen, Cumbria	Promoted from Counties 1 Cumbria
West Hartlepool	Brinkburn	2,000 (76 seats)	Hartlepool, County Durham	Promoted from Counties 1 D&N

Locations of the 2023–24 Regional 2 North teams in Northumberland, Tyne & Wear, Durham & North Yorkshire
Locations of the 2023–24 Regional 2 North teams in Cumbria

=== League table ===
Regional 2 North 2023–24
	Team	Played	Won	Drawn	Lost	Points for	Points against	Points diff	Try bonus	Loss bonus	Points	Points deducted
1	Percy Park (P)	22	19	0	3	775	340	435	20	2	99	0
2	Northern	22	19	0	3	660	337	323	15	1	92	0
3	Middlesbrough	22	15	1	6	637	405	232	16	4	82	0
4	Durham City	22	13	0	9	559	406	153	9	7	68	0
5	Aspatria	22	11	0	11	461	541	−80	4	4	52	0
6	West Hartlepool	22	8	1	13	436	544	−108	10	5	50	0
7	Morpeth	22	10	0	12	502	552	−50	6	3	49	0
8	Consett	22	10	0	12	545	596	−51	7	2	49	0
9	Upper Eden	22	9	1	12	423	439	−16	5	5	48	0
10	Keswick	22	8	0	14	397	520	−123	4	6	42	0
11	Stockton (R)	22	8	0	14	397	576	−179	7	1	40	0
12	Cockermouth (R)	22	0	1	21	169	705	−536	1	2	−5	−10
If teams are level at any stage, tiebreakers are applied in the following order: 1. Number of matches won 2. Number of draws 3. Difference between points for and against 4. Total number of points for 5. Aggregate number of points scored in matches between tied teams 6. Number of matches won excluding the first match, then the second and so on until the tie is settled
Green background is the promotion place. Pink background are the relegation places. Updated: 3 November 2024; Source:

== 2022–23 ==
This was the first season following the Rugby Football Union (RFU) Adult Competition Review. The league had some similarities with North 1 East as three clubs returned, but was smaller (14 teams reduced to 12) and the vast majority of Yorkshire RFU clubs were allocated to Regional 2 North East. The league was supplemented by the top five sides from Durham/Northumberland 1 together with three from North 1 West and one each from North 2 West and Yorkshire 1.

Team	Ground	Capacity	City/Area	Previous season
Aspatria	Bower Park	3,000 (300 seats)	Aspatria, Cumbria	5th DN1
Carlisle	Rugby Ground, Warwick Road	1,500 (250 seats)	Carlisle, Cumbria	14th North 1 West
Consett	Amethyst Park		Consett, County Durham	13th North 1 East
Durham City	Hollow Drift	3,000 (500 seats)	Durham, County Durham	12th North 1 East
Keswick	Davidson Park		Keswick, Cumbria	3rd North 2 West
Middlesbrough	Acklam Park	5,000 (159 seats)	Acklam, Middlesbrough, North Yorkshire	1st Yorkshire 1
Morpeth	Grange House Field	1,000	Morpeth, Northumberland	6th North 1 East
Northern	McCracken Park	1,000	Gosforth, Newcastle upon Tyne, Tyne and Wear	2nd DN1
Penrith	Winters Park		Penrith, Cumbria	6th North 1 West
Percy Park	Preston Avenue		North Shields, Tyne and Wear	1st DN1
South Shields Westoe	Wood Terrace		South Shields, Tyne and Wear	3rd DN1
Stockton	The Grangefield Ground		Stockton-on-Tees, County Durham	4th DN1

Locations of the 2022–23 Regional 2 North teams in Northumberland, Tyne & Wear, Durham & North Yorkshire
Locations of the 2022–23 Regional 2 North teams in Cumbria

=== League table ===
Regional 2 North 2022–23
	Team	Played	Won	Drawn	Lost	Points for	Points against	Points diff	Try bonus	Loss bonus	Points	Points deducted
1	Penrith (P)	21	19	0	2	1014	274	740	18	1	95	0
2	Morpeth	22	18	0	4	842	285	557	16	2	90	0
3	Northern	22	17	0	5	646	302	344	12	4	85	0
4	Percy Park	22	15	0	7	743	463	280	14	3	77	0
5	Middlesbrough	22	13	0	9	668	452	216	12	5	69	0
6	Durham City	21	14	0	7	585	370	215	10	2	68	0
7	Aspatria	22	8	1	13	518	576	−58	7	2	43	0
8	Consett	22	7	1	14	431	747	−316	6	2	38	0
9	Keswick	22	6	1	15	366	685	−319	3	4	33	0
10	Stockton	22	6	0	16	368	849	−481	4	2	30	0
11	South Shields Westoe (R)	22	5	2	15	282	846	−564	3	1	28	0
12	Carlisle (R)	22	0	1	21	319	933	−614	6	4	7	−5
If teams are level at any stage, tiebreakers are applied in the following order: 1. Number of matches won 2. Number of draws 3. Difference between points for and against 4. Total number of points for 5. Aggregate number of points scored in matches between tied teams 6. Number of matches won excluding the first match, then the second and so on until the tie is settled
Green background is the promotion place. Pink background are the relegation places. Updated: 30 October 2024; Source:

== Regional 2 North (2022– ) ==
League restructuring by the RFU created twelve leagues at level six. The champions are promoted to Regional 1 North East or Regional 1 North West and the bottom sides are relegated to Counties 1 Cumbria or Counties 1 Durham & Northumberland.

Regional 2 North
Season	No of teams	No of matches	Champions	Runners-up	Relegated team(s)	Ref
2022–23	12	22	Penrith	Morpeth	South Shields Westoe and Carlisle	
2023–24	12	22	Percy Park	Northern	Stockton and Cockermouth	
2024-25	12	22	Middlesbrough	Northern	Carlisle and Kirkby Lonsdale	
Green background is the promotion place.
