= David Graham (rugby union) =

English rugby union and rugby league player

Personal information
- Full name: David Graham
- Born: June 1875 Aspatria, Cumbria, England
- Died: January 1962 (aged 86–87)

Playing information

Rugby union
Club
Years	Team	Pld	T	G	FG	P
	Aspatria RUFC	0	0	0	0	0
	Keswick RFC	0	0	0	0	0
	New Brighton RFC	0	0	0	0	0
	Total	0	0	0	0	0
Representative
Years	Team	Pld	T	G	FG	P
1901	England	1	0	0	0	0

Rugby league
Club
Years	Team	Pld	T	G	FG	P
	Aspatria Hornets	0	0	0	0	0
- As of 11 Oct 2021

David Graham (June 1875 – January 1962 in Carlisle) was an English rugby football player, from Aspatria, in Cumberland.

He played once for England, against Wales in the 1901 Home Nations Championship.

He played for Aspatria RUFC, Keswick RFC, Rochdale, New Brighton and Cumberland, as well as Aspatria Hornets rugby league team.
