= Chris Wardlow =

English rugby union player (1942–2024)

- Full name: Christopher Story Wardlow
- Born: 12 July 1942 Carlisle, Cumbria, England
- Died: 11 February 2024 (aged 81) Carlisle, Cumbria, England

Rugby union career
- Position: Centre
International career
| Years | Team | Apps | (Points) |
| 1969–71 | England | 6 | (0) |

Christopher Story Wardlow (12 July 1942 – 11 February 2024) was an English rugby union international.

A Carlisle RFC product, Wardlow was capped six times by England and debuted in a win over the Springboks at Twickenham in 1969, substituting injured fullback Bob Hiller in the final minutes of the match. He was an England centre in all four Tests of the 1971 Five Nations and in that year's Centenary match against Scotland at Murrayfield.

Wardlow, who also played for Northampton and Coventry, made the British Lions squad for the 1971 to New Zealand and Australia but missed the trip after breaking his jaw while playing for Northern Counties.

Wardlow died from complications of Alzheimer's disease in Carlisle, on 11 February 2024, at the age of 81.

== See also ==
- List of England national rugby union players
