= Penrith RUFC =

English rugby union club, based in Cumbria

(England) Penrith
- Full name: Penrith Rugby Football Club Ltd
- Union: Cumbria RU
- Founded: 1881; 145 years ago
- Location: Penrith, Cumbria, England
- Ground: Winters Park
- Chairman: Geoff Matthews
- President: Charles Graves
- Coach: Dave Preston
- Captain: Jamie McNaughton/Adam Howe
- League: Regional 1 North West
- 2024–25: 7th

Official website
- www.pitchero.com/clubs/penrithrufc/

Penrith Rugby Football Club is an English rugby union team based in Penrith, Cumbria. The club runs two senior male sides, a senior ladies team, a colts team, ex-players team and has a junior section with both boys and girls teams through all ages. The first XV currently play in Regional 1 North West and the club's 2nd XV plays in Counties 1 Cumbria.

== Honours ==
1st team:

- Cumbria Cup winners (8): 1960, 2000, 2005, 2006, 2009, 2010, 2011, 2012, 2019
- Regional 2 North champions: 2022–23
- North Division 2 East champions (2): 2005–06, 2008–09
- North Lancashire/Cumbria v South Lancs/Cheshire 1 promotion play-off winner: 2002–03

2nd team:

- Cumbria Shield winners (3): 2004, 2005, 2007, 2022

3rd team:

- Cumbria Shield winners (2): 2014, 2015
- Cumbria Vase winners: 2015
