= Westmorland and Furness Cup =

- Sport: Rugby Union
- Instituted: 1964; 62 years ago
- Ceased: 2008; 18 years ago
- Country: England
- Holders: Millom (1st title) (2007–08)
- Most titles: Kendal (10 titles)
- Website: Cumbria Rugby Union

The Westmorland and Furness Cup was a rugby union knock-out club competition first organised by the Westmorland and Furness Rugby Football Unions. The original incarnation of the cup was believed to have been formed in the 1890s around the same time as the better known Cumberland Challenge Cup (now Cumbria Cup) but records of its history are scarce. The modern version of the Westmorland and Furness Cup was first introduced during the 1964–65 season and was won by Windermere.

Despite the formation of Cumbria and the Cumbria Rugby Union in 1974, the Westmorland and Furness Cup continued to be held on a fairly regular basis throughout the 1970s and 1980s. In the 1990s the larger clubs in the region tended to field their 'A' sides, instead focusing on the more prestigious Cumbria Cup, and by the 21st century interest in the competition had started to wane and it was cancelled after the 2007–08 season.

== Westmorland and Furness Cup winners ==
Westmorland and Furness Cup Finals
Season	Winner	Score	Runners–up	Venue
1964–65	Windermere			
1966–72	No competition			
1973–74	Kendal A		Furness A	Barrow
1974–75	No competition			
1975–76	Windermere		Kendal A	Mint bridge, Kendal
1976–77	Furness 'A'	30–4	Windermere	Strawberry Grounds, Barrow-in-Furness
1977–78	Windermere			
1978–79	Windermere		Hawkcoat Park A	Windermere
1979–80	Windermere			
1980–81	Windermere		Upper Eden	
1981–82	Windermere	24-10	Upper Eden	Windermere
1982–83	Hawcoat Park 'A'			
1983–84	Upper Eden		Windermere	
1984–85	Kendal 'A'		Winderemere	
1985–86	Kirkby Lonsdale			
1986–87	Windermere		Upper Eden	
1987–88	Windermere	30-9	Upper Eden	Dawes Meadow
1988–89	Upper Eden	13-3	Millom	Pennine Park, Kirkby Stephen
1989–90	Kendal 'A'	11-3	Kirkby Lonsdale A	Underley Park
1990–91	Kendal 'A'	22-11	Upper Eden	
1991–92	Kendal 'A'	32-10	Millom	Mint Bridge, Kendal
1992–93	Kendal 'A'	15-3	Kirkby Lonsdale 'A'	Mint Bridge, Kendal
1993–94	Kendal 'A'	40-0	Millom	Mint Bridge, Kendal
1994–95	Kendal 'A'	25-3	Millom	
1995–96	Kendal 'A'	47-12	Millom	Wilson Park, Millom
1996–97	Kirkby Lonsdale 'A'	34-9	Furness A	
1997–98	Ambleside		Millom	
1998–99	Upper Eden		Millom	Wilson Park, Haverigg
1999-00	Kendal 'A'	39-3	Furness	
2000–01	No competition			
2002–03	Upper Eden II	37–0	Windermere	
2003–04	Kirkby Lonsdale 'A'			
2004–07	No competition			
2007–08	Millom	27–10	Upper Eden	Raygarth, Kirkby Lonsdale

== Number of wins ==
- Kendal (10) (Note: Includes 9 wins by an Kendal 'A' team. Note that the Cumbria Rugby Union have listed Kendal 'A' as having won in 2003 but the Cumberland & Westmorland Herald had a final result of Upper Eden defeating Windermere 37–0.)
- Windermere (9)
- Upper Eden (4) (Note: Includes 1 win by Upper Eden's second team.)
- Kirkby Lonsdale (3) (Note: Includes 2 wins by an Kirkby Lonsdale 'A' team.)
- Ambleside (1)
- Furness 'A' (1)
- Hawcoat Park 'A' (1)
- Millom (1)

== See also ==
- Cumbria Rugby Union
- Cumbria Cup
- Cumbria League Cup
- Cumbria Shield
- Cumbria Vase
