= Workington RFC =

English rugby union club, based in Workington, Cumbria

(England) Workington
- Full name: Workington Rugby Football Club
- Union: Cumbria RU
- Nickname: Zebras
- Founded: 1877; 149 years ago
- Location: Workington, Cumbria, England
- Ground: Ellis Sports Ground (Capacity: 12,000 (2,000 seats))
- Chairman: David Exley
- President: William McCoubrey
- Coach: Ross Mills
- Captain: Andrew Bowe
- League: Counties 1 Cumbria
- 2025-26: 8th
Team kit

Workington RFC (founded 1877), also known as Workington Zebras, is an English rugby union club that is based in the town of Workington in Cumbria. The club operates four men's teams, a ladies teams and four boy's junior teams (under 13 to under 18). The men's 1st XV currently play in Counties 1 Cumbria – a level 7 league in the English rugby union system. They play home games at the Ellis Sports Ground.

== History ==
Formed in 1877 as 'Workington Football Club', the club had its first ever game in November of that year, a loss against fellow Cumbrian side, Whitehaven, who had themselves formed in 1876. Founded by cricketers looking for a summer game, the club played early fixtures at Valentine Ground, which they shared with Workington Cricket Club. They were based at the cricket club until 1882, when they moved to a newly built enclosure on the Cloffocks, which they named Lonsdale Park. The new ground officially opened on 10 September 1892.

In 1890 the club gained its nickname 'Zebras' when Boer War veterans, who were watching a game involving the side, gave the unflattering remark that they played like 'a herd of Zebras', which was (at the time) as much a reflection on the way they played the game as their kit of black and white stripes. Despite early misgivings of the Zebras playing abilities by these visitors the club would go on to win its first major silverware several years later, winning back-to-back Cumberland Shield titles in 1897 and 1898.

In 1895 the Northern Football Union was formed, with many northern clubs deciding to leave the Rugby Football Union for this new organisation, including Workington who joined in 1898. Part of the appeal of the Northern Football Union was that it offered the chance for players to earn money from match appearances, which the amateur RFU were dead against. Although Workington were very successful during this period, winning the Cumberland Senior three years running between 1907 and 1909, the demands of professionalism caused the club to go into voluntary liquidation in 1909 when they merged with another local club, Workington Trades, to form Workington Rugby Union Football Club. This merger also saw the newly formed Workington RUFC return to Valentine Ground.

The years after World War I saw Workington enter a golden spell as they became one of the top rugby union clubs in northern England, with the 1st XV winning the Cumberland Cup five times in the 1920s and once more in the 1930s. The 2nd XV was also impressive winning the Cumbria Shield twice in the 1920s and then three times during the following decade. In 1925 left the Valentine Ground for the second time to move to its new home at the Ellis Sports Ground. The Ellis Sports Ground was much more impressive than that of the cricket club, with a (then) capacity of 16,000, which included 2,000 seated in the grandstand. During this time the club also produced two England international caps in the Lawson brothers.

Following World War II the club would have another period of success in the 1950s and early 1960s before sliding into decline, and by the advent of the leagues in 1987, Workington were ranked in the lower levels of the English rugby union system. Although they won promotion in 1988 they did little until the end of the 1990s, when over a period of three seasons they forced their way up the leagues, gaining promotion from the old North West 3 in 1999, winning North West 2 in 2000 and then finally North Lancashire/Cumbria in 2001, to reach North 1 West, which at tier 7 is the highest level Workington had reached in its history. This also coincided with the club winning its first senior cup for 40 years, winning the (now) Cumbria Cup back-to-back in 2001 and 2002. The good times did not last long as Workington were relegated from North 1 West after just one season and then again from North Lancashire/Cumbria in 2005. Although they have won Cumbria 1 twice (in 2006 and 2016) they have struggled to rise up the leagues, and at the end of the 2017–18 season they suffered the misfortune of being relegated to Cumbria 2 despite finishing 6th due to restructuring of the Cumbrian regional leagues.

== Ground ==
Workington RFC have played home games at Ellis Sports Ground since 1925. It is located off Moss Bay Road, next to the Clay Flatts Industrial Estate in the western part of Workington. Access to the ground is good with plenty of parking, and Workington railway station is just a mile away and within walking distance.

The capacity of Ellis Sports Ground is around 12,000 which includes 2,000 seated in the stand. This capacity figure was reached on 22 November 1972, when 12,000 supporters watched the North-West record a historic 16–14 victory over New Zealand - the first time an English club or regional team had ever beaten the All Blacks. Today such crowds are just a memory, although the ground still hosts the occasional Cumbria game in the County Championship.

== Honours ==
1st team:

- Cumbria Shield winners (3): 1897, 1898, 1909 (Note: Includes 1909 win by Workington Trades RUFC - the side that would merge with Workington RUFC in 1910 to form the current club.)
- Cumberland Senior Cup winners (3): 1907 1908 1909
- Cumbria Cup winners (12): 1920, 1921, 1924, 1925, 1926, 1931, 1950, 1953, 1954, 1962, 2001, 2002
- W.H Lawson Cup winners: 1985
- North West 2 champions: 1999–00
- North Lancashire/Cumbria champions: 2000–01
- Cumbria 1 champions (2): 2006–07, 2015–16
- Cumbria Plate winners: 2007

2nd team:

- Cumbria Shield winners (16): 1914, 1920, 1926, 1931, 1935, 1936, 1949, 1950, 1951, 1954, 1956, 1958, 1960, 1972, 2000, 2003, 2020

== See also ==
- Rugby union in Cumbria
- Workington Town R.L.F.C.
- Workington A.F.C.
