= Kirkby Lonsdale RUFC =

English rugby union club, based in Cumbria

(England) Kirkby Lonsdale
- Union: Cumbria RU
- Founded: 1877; 149 years ago
- Location: Kirkby Lonsdale, Cumbria, England
- Ground: Underley Park
- League: Counties 1 Cumbria
- 2025-26: 1st (Winners of Counties 1 Cumbria)

Largest defeat
- Blackburn 190 - 0 (25 February 2023)

Kirkby Lonsdale Rugby Club is an English rugby union club based in Kirkby Lonsdale, Cumbria. The first XV team currently play in Counties 1 Cumbria following their relegation from Regional 2 North at the end of season 2024–25.

On 25 February 2023 Blackburn defeated Kirby Lonsdale 190–0.

== Honours ==
- Westmorland & Furness Cup winners (3): 1986, 1997, 2004 (Note: Includes two wins by Kirkby Lonsdale 'A' team.)
- North-West North 1 champions: 1988–89
- Cumbria Shield winners: 2001
- North Lancashire 1 winners: 2006–07
- North Lancashire/Cumbria v South Lancs/Cheshire 1 promotion play-off winners (2): 2009–10, 2011–12
- North 1 West champions: 2016–17
- Cumbria 1 champions: 2025-26
