= Carlisle RFC =

English rugby union club

(England) Carlisle
- Union: Cumbria RU
- Founded: 1873; 153 years ago
- Location: Carlisle, Cumbria, England
- Ground(s): Rugby Ground, Warwick Road (Capacity: 1,500 (250 seats))
- Chairman: Duncan Harty
- President: Sue Glendinning
- Coach: George Graham
- Captain: Tom Graham
- League: Counties 1 Cumbria
- 2025-26: 3rd
Team kit

Official website
- www.pitchero.com/clubs/carlislerugby

Carlisle Rugby Club is an English rugby union club based in Carlisle, Cumbria. The first XV team currently plays in Counties 1 Cumbria. As well as a 1st XV, the club also operates men's 2nd XV (Crusaders), an occasional 3rd XV (Hornets) side, a Colts (under-18), a women's side (Cougars), and a number of junior sides for boys and girls aged 6 to 16.

== History ==
=== Early years ===
Carlisle were formed in 1873, with their first-ever game played at home against Scottish side Langholm. The club originally played in black jerseys, with a white Maltese cross added by 1879. In 1886, Carlisle claimed their first-ever silverware, winning the Cumberland Cup, a feat it repeated in 1908 and 1910. The club also regularly contributed players to the Cumberland county team, three of whom went on to play for England, including C.E.Chapman in 1884, and W.M.B.Nanson and J.R.Morgan in 1920. Having played home games at a number of locations in 1895 Carlisle moved to a permanent home at Warwick Road, with a grandstand put up in 1923.

=== Post war ===
The club initially struggled after World War II but fundraising during the 1950s saw the club upgrade the club-house and open new changing rooms. The 1960s saw an upturn in the club's fortunes when they won the Cumberland Cup in 1961, over half a century since their last county silverware - and the 1967–68 season was the best the club had experienced so far, with 33 wins, 3 draws and 4 losses out of 40 played. During this period many of the club's players turned out for the Cumberland county side, with Chris Wardlow going on to play for England between 1969–71 and just missing out on selection for the British and Irish Lions due to injury. Although the results started to decline during the 1970s, off the pitch, facilities continued to improve with the changing rooms upgrading in 1971 and flood lights erected three years later in 1974. Additionally, a colts (under-19s) side was established towards the end of the decade.

=== League rugby ===
The introduction of the leagues in the 1986–87 season saw Carlisle placed in North West Division 2 – a league at tier 8 of the English rugby union system. During this period the club experienced several promotions up to North 2, while the 'A' team tasted success in county cup competition, winning the Cumbria Shield in 1989. The period was also notable for a mini section (juniors) being introduced. Future England international Ian Hunter also played several seasons at the club prior to moving to Northampton Saints. The 1990s were fairly quiet, although a women's side (The 'Cougars') was created in 1994 and the men's 2nd XV had some success in the Cumbria League Division 1.

In 2000 Carlisle were transferred from North West 2 into North Lancashire/Cumbria following the cessation of that league. The 2004–05 season was a notable one for the club, less for on-field activities but rather for to the 'Great Carlisle Flood' of January 2005, which swamped Warwick Road, flooding the pitch, ruining the club house and leaving the club homeless for the rest of the season, with games being played at Wigton, and across the border at Langholm RFC. The following season, the club recovered from the disaster in best possible manner by winning North Lancashire/Cumbria and being promoted into North 1 West (tier 6). This success was duplicated by the 2nd XV, who won back to back Cumbria Vase victories in 2010 and 2011.

Although the 1st XV remained stable in North 1 West for a decade, in 2016 they were finally relegated after finishing 12th. They did not remain in North Lancashire/Cumbria for long, finishing as champions at the end of 2016–17 and claiming promotion back to North 1 West. They also made it a double that season with their first Cumbria Cup victory since 1961, beating St Benedict's 29–13 in the final held at Bower Park in Aspatria. In 2019, after two seasons in North 1 West, Carlisle won the league title and promotion to North Premier –which at tier 5 is the highest level the club had reached in its league history.

=== Ground ===
Carlisle have been based at the Rugby Ground on Warwick Road since 1895. The ground is located in the east of Carlisle on Warwick Road, next door to Brunton Park, home of Carlisle United Football Club. Access to the ground is good with ample parking, and Carlisle railway station is less than a mile's walk away. The ground has a grandstand next to the main pitch, and there are also several additional pitches for 2nd, 3rd XV and junior rugby. The club-house is just off the main pitch and has two bars and a range of other rooms which can be let for conferences and other events. The capacity around the main pitch is approximately 1,500, which includes 250 seated in the grandstand, the rest standing.

== Honours ==
1st team:

- Cumbria Cup winners (5): 1886, 1908, 1910, 1961, 2017
- North West 1 champions: 1987–88
- North Lancashire/Cumbria champions: 2005–06, 2016–17
- North 1 West champions: 2018–19
- Cumbria 1 champions: 2023-24

A team/2nd team:

- Cumbria Shield winners: 1989
- Cumbria Vase winners (2): 2010, 2011

== Notable players ==
- C.E.Chapman - gained 1 cap for England at the 1884 Home Nations Championship
- Ian Hunter - London born fullback and winger, who spent part of his early career at Carlisle. Went on to play for Northampton Saints and England, with whom he would gain 7 caps, appearing in the 1995 World Cup.
- J.R.Morgan - capped for England in 1920
- William Nanson - gained 2 caps for England at the 1907 Home Nations Championship. Died in 1915 fighting at Gallipoli during World War I.
- Chris Wardlow - Carlisle born centre, who started his career with the club before joining Northampton. Would go on to gain 11 caps for England between 1969–71 and was selected for the Lions only to miss the tour due to injury.
- Leonard West
