= Kendal RUFC =

English rugby union club

Kendal
- Full name: Kendal Rugby Union Football Club
- Union: Cumbria RU
- Founded: 1905; 121 years ago
- Location: Kendal, Cumbria, England
- Ground: Mint Bridge Stadium (Capacity: 3,500 - 258 seats)
- Chairman: Stephen Green
- President: Mike Bowerbank
- Coach: Steve Whitehead
- League: Regional 1 North West
- 2024–25: 9th
Team kit

Official website
- www.kendalrugby.co.uk

Kendal Rugby Football Club is an English rugby union team based in Kendal, Cumbria. The first XV currently play in Regional 1 North West, a level five league in the English league system, following the club's promotion from North 1 West at the end of the 2021–22 season.

== History ==
Kendal RUFC was formed in 1905. moving to their present ground at Mint Bridge in 1927. The club found success in the decades before league rugby was introduced in 1987 and the club was placed in North One. By the turn of the century they were in National Division Two, finishing in fourth place in their first season in the third tier of English rugby. In 2002–03 they were relegated for the first time in the club's history and have subsequently dropped down two further levels.

== Ground ==
Originally based at Maude's Meadow until 1906, Kendal moved to Mint Bridge off Shap Road in 1927. The original Mint Bridge had a capacity of 4,600 (including 600 seated in the stand), and attracted some decent crowds including 3,000 achieved in 1999 when Kendal lost 20–25 to London Scottish in the fourth round of the Tetley's Bitter Cup.

They remained at the old Mint Bridge up until the end of the 2016–17 season when they sold the land to Sainsbury's for the construction of a supermarket. The money from the sale enabled Kendal to build a new ground (retaining the Mint Bridge name) just up the road. It cost up to £11 million – a figure that included a £3.5 million club-house – and the development began in July 2016, undertaken by local construction group Pinington. The ground was completed in time for the 2017–18 season, with the first game taking place against Preston Grasshoppers on 30 September 2017; a 19–25 defeat in front of a crowd of over 1,000.

The new Mint Bridge Stadium has a 4G pitch with electronic scoreboard alongside the club-house/stand, with additional facilities including a function room, kitchen, cafe, children's play area and memorial garden. Capacity at the ground allows for up to 3,000 standing pitch side, along with 258 seats in the stand and space for 200 on the club-house balcony, bringing total capacity to approximately 3,500.

== Honours ==
1st team:

- Westmorland & Furness Cup winners (10): 1974, 1985, 1990, 1991, 1992, 1993, 1994, 1995, 1996, 2000 (Note: Westmorland & Furness Cup honours includes nine wins by a Kendal 'A' team.)
- North 1 champions (2): 1988–89, 2007–08
- Cumbria Cup winners (5): 1995, 1998, 2007, 2008, 2018, 2025-2026
- Jewson National League 2 North champions: 1999–00
- North 1 West champions: 2015–16

2nd team:

- Cumbria Shield winners: 1996
- Cumbria Vase winners (3): 2008, 2009, 2012

== Teams List ==
Seniors

- 1st XV
- Wasps
- 2nd XV
- U18 Senior Colts
- Auld Greys Walking Rugby
- Social Rugby

Girls

- Tri Counties Tigers U18
- U16 Girls
- U14 Girls

Junior Hornets

- U16 Hornets
- U15 Hornets
- U14 Hornets
- U13 Hornets

Mini Hornets

- U12 Hornets
- U11 Hornets
- U10 Hornets
- U9 Hornets
- U8 Hornets
- U7 Hornets
- Little Stingers

== See also ==
- Rugby union in Cumbria
