= Cumbria Shield =

UK annual rugby union competition

- Sport: Rugby Union
- Instituted: 1888; 138 years ago (Cumberland Challenge Shield); 1974; 52 years ago (Cumbria Shield)
- Country: England
- Holders: Wigton II (10th title) (2017–18)
- Most titles: Workington (18 titles)
- Website: Cumbria Rugby Union

The Cumbria Shield is an annual rugby union knock-out club competition organized by the Cumbria Rugby Union. It was introduced during the 1888–89 season, when it was known as the Cumberland Challenge Shield, and the inaugural winners were Millom. Initially it was open only to junior club sides in Cumberland (senior sides played in the Challenge Cup) but in 1974, as a result of the Local Government Act 1972, Cumberland, Westmorland and Furness merged to form what we now know as Cumbria, and the competition would ultimately be renamed as the Cumbria Shield. It is the third most important cup competition in Cumbria, behind the Cumbria Cup and Cumbria League Cup.

Originally the Shield was a knock-out cup played by the 1st teams of junior clubs, along with the 2nd teams of senior clubs, before becoming mostly a 2nd team competition. In later years the format switched back and forth between a knock-out cup and league cup-hybrid, but has most recently switched to being awarded to the winners of the Cumbria Shield League – a regional league for 2nd and 3rd teams in Cumbria. A secondary competition known as the Cumbria Vase was introduced in 2007 initially for sides knocked out of the early rounds of the Shield competition, although in recent years it seems to have become a stand-alone cup competition for 2nd teams in the region.

== Cumbria Shield winners ==
Cumbria Shield Finals
Season	Winner	Score	Runners–up	Venue
1888-89	Millom II	6-4	Cleator	Egremont
1889-90	Egremont II	5-1	Aspatria II	Colliery Recreation Ground, Whitehaven
1890-91	Millom II	4-0	Dearham Juniors	Egremont
1891-92	Millom II	15-0	Whitehaven Recreation	Cleator
1892-93	Whitehaven Recreation	10-0	Carlisle II	Maryport
1893-94	Maryport II	13-3	Cowan Sheldonians	Carlisle
1894-95	Millom II	3-0	Wath Brow	Egremont
1895-96	Wath Brow	3-0	Maryport Red Rose	Lonsdale Park, Workington
1896-97	Workington II	3-0	Highmoor Rovers	Maryport
1897-98	Workington II	5-3	Whitehaven Recreation	Whitehaven
1898-99	Highmoor Rover	3-0	Aspatria Hornets	Whitehaven
1900-06	No competition			
1906-07	Aspatria II	3-0	Cockermouth II	Aspatria Agriculture College
1907-08	Wigton	5-0	Aspatria II	Cockermouth
1908-09	Workington Trades	6-0	Silloth II	Noble Croft, Aspatria
1909-10	Cockermouth II	6-3	Wigton II	Park Ground, Silloth
1910-11	Wigton II	5-3	Workington II	Noble Croft, Aspatria
1911-12	Whitehaven II	10-3	Cockermouth II	Noble Croft, Aspatria
1912-13	Blennerhasset II	6-3	Silloth II	Brindle Field, Wigton
1913-14	Workington II	6-3	Cockermouth II	Whitehaven
1914-18	No competition due to World War I			
1919-20	Workington II	5-0	Silloth II	Noble Croft, Aspatria
1920-21	Great Clifton II	5-3	Aspatria II	Cockermouth
1921-22	Aspatria II	9-0	Egremont II	Whitehaven
1922-23	Silloth II	3-0	Aspatria II	Carlisle
1923-24	Aspatria II	8-6	Blennerhasset II	Park Ground, Silloth
1924-25	Aspatria II	17-3	Silloth II	Carlisle
1925-26	Workington II	16-3	Silloth II	Noble Croft, Aspatria
1926-27	Cockermouth II	3-0	St Bees II	Ellis Sports Ground, Workington
1927-28	Wigton Hornets	11-5	Workington II	Cockermouth
1928-29	Aspatria II	17-3	Moresby II	Ellis Sports Ground, Workington
1929-30	Aspatria II	6-0	Cockermouth II	Ellis Sports Ground, Workington
1930-31	Workington II	6-3	Aspatria II	Cockermouth
1931-32	Whitehaven II	12-3	Egremont II	St Bees
1932-33	Aspatria II	3-3; 8-0	Bothel	Ellis Sports Ground, Workington
1933-34	Cockermouth II	6-3	Egremont II	Ellis Sports Ground, Workington
1934-35	Workington II	23-4	Cockermouth II	Bleach Green, Egremont
1935-36	Workington II	14-5	Whitehaven II	Bleach Green, Egremont
1936-37	Moresby II	11-3	Workington II	Bleach Green, Egremont
1937-38	Aspatria II	3-0	Workington II	Silloth
1938-39	Egremont II	4-0	Cockermouth II	Ellis Sports Ground, Workington
1940-45	No competition due to World War II			
1946-47	Silloth 2nds	3-0	Cockermouth 2nds	Ellis Sports Ground, Workington
1947-48	Cockermouth 2nds	6-0	Silloth 2nds	Wigton
1948-49	Workington II	3-3; 8-3	Keswick II	Cockermouth
1949-50	Workington 2nds	24-9	Carlisle II	Wigton
1950-51	Workington II	14-9	Whitehaven II	Bleach Green, Egremont
1951-52	Egremont 2nds	11-9	Aspatria 2nds	Ellis Sports Ground, Workington
1952-53	Egremont 2nds	15-0	Aspatria 2nds	Ellis Sports Ground, Workington
1953-54	Workington 2nds	6-3	Egremont 2nds	Whitehaven
1954-55	Egremont 2nds	5-3	Whitehaven 2nds	Cockermouth
1955-56	Workington 2nds	9-3	Egremont 2nds	Whitehaven
1956-57	Millom 2nds	6-5	Egremont 2nds	Ellis Sports Ground, Workington
1957-58	Workington 2nds	12-6	Millom 2nds	Bleach Green, Egremont
1958-59	Border Regiment	9-3	Workington 2nds	Wigton
1959-60	Workington II	3-0	British Steels	Cockermouth
1960-61	British Steels	6-0	Netherhall Old Boys	Ellis Sports Ground, Workington
1961-62	Cumberland & Westmorland Police	9-8	Netherhall Old Boys	Ellis Sports Ground, Workington
1962-63	Whitehaven II	15-3	Netherhall Old Boys	Ellis Sports Ground, Workington
1963-64	Netherhall Old Boys	6-3	British Steels	Cockermouth
1964-65	Netherhall Old Boys	6-3	Whitehaven II	Ellis Sports Ground, Workington
1965-66	Netherhall Old Boys	15-9	Whitehaven II	Ellis Sports Ground, Workington
1966-67	Netherhall Old Boys	6-3	Whitehaven II	Ellis Sports Ground, Workington
1967-68	Whitehaven II	12-6	Netherhall Old Boys	Ellis Sports Ground, Workington
1968-69	Netherhall Old Boys	18-9	Whitehaven II	Bleach Green, Egremont
1969-70	Netherhall Old Boys	13-0	Workington II	Laithwaite Ground, Cockermouth
1970-71	Wigton II	9-6	Whitehaven II	Ellis Sports Ground, Workington
1971-72	Workington II	7-3	Wigton II	Cockermouth
1972-73	Wigton II	16-9	Whitehaven II	Ellis Sports Ground, Workington
1973-74	Wigton II	18-7	Smith Bros	Ellis Sports Ground, Workington
1974-75	Cockermouth II	15-9	Smith Bros	Whitehaven
1975-76	Wigton II	10-10; 9-6	Smith Bros	Bower Park, Aspatria
1976-77	Millom II	23-22	British Steels	Whitehaven
1977-78	Netherhall Old Boys	3-0	Workington II	Bower Park, Aspatria
1978-79	Netherhall Old Boys	16-3	Silloth	Lowmoor Road, Wigton
1979-80	Wigton II	10-7	Egremont II	Ellis Sports Ground, Workington
1980-81	Aspatria II	9-6	Netherhall II	Lowmoor Road, Wigton
1981-82	Aspatria II	15-12	Wigton II	Whitehaven
1982-83	Aspatria II	12-6	Egremont II	Whitehaven
1983-84	St Benedict's	9-4	Egremont A	Walkmill Park, Moresby
1984-85	St Benedict's	12-6	Workington II	Whitehaven
1985-86	Aspatria II	18-3	British Steels	Netherhall
1986-87	St Benedict's	9-6	Smith Bros	Whitehaven
1987-88	St Benedict's	9-3	Wigton II	Netherhall
1988-89	Carlisle 'A'			
1989-90	St Benedict's			
1990-91	Silloth			
1991-92	Silloth			
1992-93	Aspatria II			
1993-94	Aspatria II			
1994-95	Netherhall II			
1995-96	Kendal II			
1996-97	Wigton II			
1997-98	Wigton II	15-8	Workington II	Netherhall
1998-99	Aspatria Eagles	13-8	St Benedict’s	Silloth
1999-00	Workington II			
2000-01	Kirkby Lonsdale II	32-9	Workington II	Carlisle
2001-02	Aspatria II	29-8	Carlisle II	Silloth
2002-03	Workington II		Penrith II	
2003-04	Penrith II			
2004-05	Penrith II			
2005-06	Aspatria II	34-25	Carlisle II	Sycamore Lane, Creighton
2006-07	Penrith II	15-3	Wigton II	Sycamore Lane, Creighton
2007-08	Silloth	16-16	Penrith III	Lowmoor Road, Wigton
2008-09	Silloth	27-20	St Benedict's II	St Benedict’s
2009-10	St Benedict's II			
2010-11	St Benedict's II			
2011-12	Moresby	12-10	Cockermouth	Netherhall Road, Maryport
2012-13	Moresby	14-5	Creighton	Grassmoor Sports Centre, Cockermouth
2013-14	Penrith III			
2014-15	Penrith III	30-12	St Benedict's II	Davidson Park, Keswick
2015-16	St Benedict's II	No final as league competition		
2016-17	Aspatria Eagles	No final as league competition		
2017-18	Wigton II	No final as league competition		
2018-19	Whitehaven	No final as league competition		
2020-2021	No Winner Due To COVID 19			
2021-22	Penrith II	No final as league competition		
2022-23	Keswick II	No final as league competition		
2023-24	No competition held			
2024-25	Keswick II	28-27	Penrith II	Lowmoor Road, Wigton
2025-26	St Benedict’s	24-10	Keswick II	Lowmoor Road, Wigton

== Cumbria Vase winners ==
Cumbria Vase Finals
Season	Winner	Score	Runners–up	Venue
2007-08	Kendal 'A'			
2008-09	Kendal 'A'			
2009-10	Carlisle 'A'			
2010-11	Carlisle 'A'			
2011-12	Kendal 'A'			
2012-13	No final			
2013-14	Creighton			
2014-15	Penrith III		Ambleside	Kendal
2015-16	St Benedicts II	14-11	Cockermouth	
2018-19	Windermere	34-5	Aspatria Eagles	Keswick
2024-25	Hawcoat Park	37-3	Creighton	Windermere

== Number of wins ==
=== Shield ===
- Workington II (19) (Note: Workington have won 19 Challenge Shield titles including the 1909 win by Workington Trades RUFC - the side that would merge with Workington RUFC in 1910 to form the current club. Figure also includes titles won by the 1st XV.)
- Aspatria II (17)
- St Benedict's (10) (Note: Includes both 1st and 2nd team titles.)
- Wigton II (10)
- Netherhall II (9) (Note: Includes 8 titles won by Netherhall Old Boys.)
- Millom II (6)
- Silloth (6)
- Cockermouth II (5)
- Egremont II (5)
- Penrith II (5)
- Whitehaven II (5)
- Moresby (3)
- Blennerhasset II (1)
- Border Regiment (1)
- Carlisle 'A' (1)
- Clifton (1) (Note: No relation to the better known Clifton RFC who are based in Bristol.)
- Cumberland & Westmorland Police (1)
- High Moor Rovers Dearham (1)
- Kendal II (1)
- Kirkby Lonsdale II (1)
- Maryport II (1) (Note: Maryport were Challenge Shield winners during the 1890s before they switched over to Rugby League in 1898-99.)
- United Steels S.O (1)
- Wath Brow (1)
- Whitehaven Recreation (1) (Note: Whitehaven Recreation won a Challenge Shield during the 1890s before switching to Rugby league in 1898. Despite being based in the same town they do not seem to have any connection with Whitehaven R.L.F.C., who were formed much later in 1948.)
- Wigton Hornets (1) (Note: It is not clear if Wigton Hornets were in any way related to Wigton RUFC - they could possibly have been the name for the Wigton 2nd team or even a separate club.)
- Workington Trades (1)

=== Vase ===
- Kendal 'A' (3)
- Carlisle 'A' (2)
- Creighton (1)
- Penrith III (1)

== See also ==
- Cumbria Rugby Union
- Cumbria Cup
- Cumbria League Cup
- Westmorland & Furness Cup
