= Cumbria Rugby Union =

Rugby union body in England

(England) Cumbria RU
- Full name: Cumbria Rugby Union
- Union: RFU
- Founded: 1872; 153 years ago (as Cumberland); 1974; 51 years ago (as Cumbria)
- Region: Cumbria
- Chairman: Neil Marston
- President: Arthur Perie
Team kit

Official website
- cumbriarfu.com

The Cumbria Rugby Union is the governing body for the sport of rugby union in the county of Cumbria in England. The union is the constituent body of the Rugby Football Union (RFU) for Cumbria, and administers and organises rugby union clubs and competitions in the county. It also administers the Cumbria rugby representative teams.

== History ==
The county that we know of today as Cumbria was originally made up of two separate counties known as Cumberland and Westmorland as well as part of Lancashire called Furness. The game of rugby union was first recorded as being played in Carlisle, Cumberland, in 1870, while Westmorland followed a year later in 1871 with a game in Kendal, and club sides sprung up in the region from this point on. Cumberland were first of the two to form a (unofficial) county representative team and, with assistance from Lancashire, they played annual matches against a combined Durham and Northumberland side during the 1870s. Although the actual date that a rugby union in either Cumberland or Westmorland was formed is vague, a centenary brochure was produced by these unions during the 1972/73 season, hinting to formation around 1872/73.

An official Cumberland county side was formed in 1882, facing Northumberland on 11 November that same year, in what was the counties first official game. On the heels of this match the Cumberland clubs bought a Challenge Cup trophy, paid from the gate money, heralding the dawn of what would later become the Cumbria Cup, which still runs today. Four years later in 1886, Westmorland would also form their own county side, and in 1890 both counties would take part in the inaugural County Championships, competing in the north-west group where they would face each other along with Cheshire and Lancashire. Cumberland had some early success in the competition, winning their regional group on several occasions and reaching the final in 1897 when they lost 3-9 to Kent, in a game held at Carlisle. By contrast Westmorland found the County Championship much more challenging and by the 1896-97 they had decided to withdraw from the competition as they were unable to raise a side.

Westmorland would remain apart from the County Championship until the 1906-07 season, when they merged with their neighbours to form Cumberland & Westmorland, taking part in the northern group. Over the next couple of decades, Cumberland & Westmorland would reach several finals, losing in 1913 before going on to win the County Championship for the first time in 1924 when they beat Kent 14-3 in Carisle. In 1974 the counties known as Cumberland and Westmorland would cease to exist as they were merged along with Furness to form Cumbria - a consequence of the Local Government Act 1972. In 1997, after a gap of over 70 years since Cumberland & Westmorland last won the competition, the new look Cumbria won the County Championship, beating Somerset 21-13 at Twickenham Stadium.

Since the County Championships was reorganized into divisions, Cumbria have failed to re-experience the success of 1997. They have reached the County Championship Shield (third tier) final at Twickenham on two occasions, losing to Surrey in 2013 and Leicestershire in 2015. The 2017 season saw Cumbria moved up into the second division based on past performances as part of the RFU reshuffle of the County Championships.

== Cumbria senior men's county side ==
The senior men's side currently play in Division 3 of the County Championship.

Honours:

- County Championship winners (2): 1924, 1997 (Note: Includes 1924 win by Cumberland.)
- County Championship Division 3 winners: 2019

== Affiliated clubs ==
There are currently 25 clubs affiliated with the Cumbria RU, most of which have teams at both senior and junior level and are based in Cumbria.

- Ambleside
- Aspatria
- Carlisle
- Cockermouth
- Creighton
- Cumbria Constabulary
- Egremont
- Furness
- Gosforth Greengarth
- Hawcoat Park
- Kendal
- Keswick
- Kirkby Lonsdale
- Millom
- Moresby
- Netherhall
- Penrith
- Silloth
- St Benedict's
- Upper Eden
- Westmorland Barbarians
- Whitehaven
- Wigton
- Windermere
- Workington

== County club competitions ==
The Cumbria RU currently runs the following competitions for club sides based in Cumbria:

=== Leagues ===
- Cumbria 1 - tier 7 league for clubs in Cumbria
- Cumbria 2 - tier 8 league

=== Cups ===
- Cumbria Cup - founded in 1882 (as Cumberland Challenge Cup), open for clubs at tiers 5-7 of the English league system
- Cumbria League Cup - founded in 2011, for clubs at tier 8
- Cumbria Shield - founded in 1888 (as Cumberland Challenge Shield), for 2nd teams in regional leagues

=== Discontinued competitions ===
- Westmorland & Furness Cup - modern version of cup founded in 1964 for clubs from Westmorland and Furness, discontinued in 2008
- North Lancashire/Cumbria (alongside Lancashire RFU) - league that was ranked at tier 7 of the English rugby union system for clubs that were based in either Cumbria or Lancashire, discontinued in 2018
- North West 1 - tier 7 league for Lancashire, Cheshire and Cumbria clubs that was abolished in 2000
- North West 2 - tier 8 league for Lancashire, Cheshire and Cumbria clubs that was abolished in 2000
- North West 3 - tier 9 league for Lancashire, Cheshire and Cumbria clubs that was abolished in 2000

== See also ==
- Northern Division
- English rugby union system
