= Counties 1 Cumbria =

English rugby union league

- Current season or competition: 2025–26 Counties 1 Cumbria
- Sport: Rugby union
- Instituted: 1992; 34 years ago
- Number of teams: 14
- Country: England
- Holders: Wigton (2024–25)
- Most titles: Keswick (5 titles)
- Website: England RFU

Counties 1 Cumbria (formerly Cumbria League and Cumbria 1) is a competitive rugby union league at level 7 of the English rugby union system run by the English Rugby Football Union (RFU) for club sides based in Cumbria. It was previously a tier 7 league but the creation of North 2 West demoted it to level 8. Promoted teams typically go up to North 2 West and from season 2026-27 relegation is to Cumbria 2, the league having been reinstated after previously being cancelled at the end of the 2018–19 season. Each season a team from Cumbria 1 is picked to take part in the RFU Senior Vase - a national competition for clubs at level 8. The original Cumbria league was formed at the start of the 1992–93 season when the North-West North 1 division was cancelled.

Until the end of the 2017–18 season the Cumbria League was a single division involving 10 clubs and ranked at tier 8 of the English rugby union system. The champions were automatically promoted to the now discontinued North Lancashire/Cumbria league and until the 2016–17 season the second placed team faced the runner-up from Lancashire (North) for the final promotion place until Lancashire (North) was cancelled. There was no relegation due to it having been the lowest competitive league for Rugby Union in Cumbria. It ran alongside the Cumbria 2 North & West and Cumbria 2 South & East Merit Leagues.

This changed for the 2018–19 season due to RFU having to restructure the northern leagues after 19 Lancashire based clubs withdrew from the league system to form their own competition. The result was that the Cumbrian clubs based in North Lancashire/Cumbria joined the top 3 Cumbria League sides in Cumbria 1, while the rest of the Cumbrian League sides along with a handful of 2nd XV teams formed Cumbria 2.

Another change to the structure from the 2018–19 season was that the division would play two stages - the first involving all eight teams to decide who would be contesting promotion and relegation during the second stage when the division was divided into two mini leagues (one promotion/one relegation). In 2022 the RFU further restructured the adult community leagues and the Cumbria League was renamed Counties 1 Cumbria from the 2022–23 season.

== Format ==
The first-placed team is promoted to Regional 2 North or Regional 2 North West. Ahead of season 2026-27 Counties 2 Cumbria was reinstated meaning relegated teams will now drop to that league.

The season runs from September to April and comprises twenty-two rounds of matches, with each club playing each of its rivals, home and away. The results of the matches contribute points to the league as follows:

- 4 points are awarded for a win
- 2 points are awarded for a draw
- 0 points are awarded for a loss, however
- 1 losing (bonus) point is awarded to a team that loses a match by 7 points or fewer
- 1 additional (bonus) point is awarded to a team scoring 4 tries or more in a match.

== 2026–27 ==
Departing were the champions Kirkby Lonsdale, promoted to Regional 2 North West.

Ahead of the new season Counties 2 Cumbria was reinstated and the teams which finished in the lower part of the table were demoted to that league, these were: Workington, Ambleside, Windermere, Creighton, Keswick II, Penrith II and Millom (8th-14th respectively).

Team	Ground	Capacity	City/Area	Previous season
Aspatria	Bower Park	3,000 (300 seats)	Aspatria, Cumbria	Relegated from Regional 2 North (11th)
Carlisle	Rugby Ground, Warwick Road	1,500 (250 seats)	Carlisle, Cumbria	3rd
Cockermouth	Grassmoor Sports Centre		Cockermouth, Cumbria	4th
Egremont	Bleach Green		Egremont, Cumbria	7th
Hawcoat Park	Hawcoat Park		Barrow-in-Furness, Cumbria	2nd
St. Benedict's	Newlands Avenue		Mirehouse, Whitehaven, Cumbria	6th
Whitehaven	Richmond Terrace		Whitehaven, Cumbria	5th
Wigton	Lowmoor Road		Wigton, Cumbria	Relegated from Regional 2 North (12th)

Locations of the 2026–27 Counties 1 Cumbria teams

== 2025–26 ==
Departing were the champions Wigton, promoted to Regional 2 North.

Team	Ground	Capacity	City/Area	Previous season
Ambleside	Galava Park		Ambleside, Cumbria	12th
Carlisle	Rugby Ground, Warwick Road	1,500 (250 seats)	Carlisle, Cumbria	Relegated from Regional 2 North (11th)
Cockermouth	Grassmoor Sports Centre		Cockermouth, Cumbria	5th
Creighton	Sycamore Lane		Carlisle, Cumbria	10th
Egremont	Bleach Green		Egremont, Cumbria	4th
Hawcoat Park	Hawcoat Park		Barrow-in-Furness, Cumbria	7th
Keswick II	Davidson Park		Keswick, Cumbria	6th
Kirkby Lonsdale	Underley Park		Kirkby Lonsdale, Cumbria	Relegated from Regional 2 North (12th)
Millom	Wilson Park		Haverigg, Millom, Cumbria	3rd
Penrith II	Winters Park		Penrith, Cumbria	2nd
St. Benedict's	Newlands Avenue		Mirehouse, Whitehaven, Cumbria	8th
Whitehaven	Richmond Terrace		Whitehaven, Cumbria	9th
Windermere	Dawes Meadow		Bowness-on-Windermere, Cumbria	13th
Workington	The Ellis Sports Ground	12,000 (2,000 seats)	Workington, Cumbria	11th

Locations of the 2025–26 Counties 1 Cumbria teams

== 2024–25 ==
Departing were Carlisle promoted to Regional 2 North, Cockermouth were relegated from Regional 2 North while Ambleside re-joined the Cumbria league after an absence of twenty years, last having competed in 2003–04.

Aspatria II (aka 'Eagles') – 11th in 2023–24 – started the season but withdrew in October leaving the league to be completed with 13 clubs.

Team	Ground	Capacity	City/Area	Previous season
Ambleside	Galava Park		Ambleside, Cumbria	Re-entry
Cockermouth	Grassmoor Sports Centre		Cockermouth, Cumbria	Relegated from Regional 2 North (12th)
Creighton	Sycamore Lane		Carlisle, Cumbria	10th
Egremont	Bleach Green		Egremont, Cumbria	3rd
Hawcoat Park	Hawcoat Park		Barrow-in-Furness, Cumbria	6th
Keswick II	Davidson Park		Keswick, Cumbria	9th
Millom	Wilson Park		Haverigg, Millom, Cumbria	8th
Penrith II	Winters Park		Penrith, Cumbria	7th
St. Benedict's	Newlands Avenue		Mirehouse, Whitehaven, Cumbria	4th
Whitehaven	Richmond Terrace		Whitehaven, Cumbria	5th
Wigton	Lowmoor Road		Wigton, Cumbria	2nd
Windermere	Dawes Meadow		Bowness-on-Windermere, Cumbria	12th
Workington	The Ellis Sports Ground	12,000 (2,000 seats)	Workington, Cumbria	13th

Locations of the 2024–25 Counties 1 Cumbria teams

=== League table ===
2024–25 Counties 1 Cumbria
		Played	Won	Drawn	Lost	Points for	Points against	Points diff	Try bonus	Loss bonus	Points	Pts adj
1	Wigton (P)	18	17	0	1	819	241	578	15	0	85	+2
2	Penrith II	18	13	0	5	692	336	356	12	1	65	0
3	Millom	17	11	0	6	389	332	57	7	2	55	+2
4	Egremont	18	10	0	8	476	424	52	10	4	55	0
5	Cockermouth	18	9	0	9	569	325	244	10	6	52	0
6	Keswick II	17	10	0	7	449	375	74	8	2	50	0
7	Hawcoat Park	18	9	0	9	359	425	−66	5	1	44	+2
8	St Benedicts	18	10	0	8	382	428	−46	7	1	43	–5
9	Whitehaven	18	9	0	9	294	258	36	5	4	36	−9
10	Creighton	17	7	0	10	356	603	−247	8	1	32	− 5
11	Workington	17	4	0	13	284	642	−358	6	2	22	−2
12	Ambleside	17	4	0	13	215	620	−405	1	2	14	−5
13	Windermere	17	1	0	16	265	540	−275	4	5	13	0
If teams are level at any stage, tiebreakers are applied in the following order: 1. Number of matches won 2. Difference between points for and against 3. Total number of points for 4. Aggregate number of points scored in matches between tied teams 5. Number of matches won excluding the first match, then the second and so on until the tie is settled
Green background is the promotion place Updated: 14 November 2025

== 2023–24 ==
Departing were Upper Eden and Cockermouth, promoted to Regional 2 North. Silloth finished 9th in 2022–23 but did not return for the new season.

Joining were Windermere re-joining the Cumbria league having last competed in 2019–20 together with Aspatria II and Keswick II.

Team	Ground	Capacity	City/Area	Previous season
Aspatria II	Bower Park	3,000 (300 seats)	Aspatria, Cumbria	New entry
Carlisle	Rugby Ground, Warwick Road	1,500 (250 seats)	Carlisle, Cumbria	Relegated from Regional 2 North (12th)
Creighton	Sycamore Lane		Carlisle, Cumbria	11th
Egremont	Bleach Green		Egremont, Cumbria	3rd
Hawcoat Park	Hawcoat Park		Barrow-in-Furness, Cumbria	8th
Keswick II	Davidson Park		Keswick, Cumbria	New entry
Millom	Wilson Park		Haverigg, Millom, Cumbria	6th
Penrith II	Winters Park		Penrith, Cumbria	10th
St. Benedict's	Newlands Avenue		Mirehouse, Whitehaven, Cumbria	7th
Whitehaven	Richmond Terrace		Whitehaven, Cumbria	5th
Wigton	Lowmoor Road		Wigton, Cumbria	4th
Windermere	Dawes Meadow		Bowness-on-Windermere, Cumbria	Re-entry
Workington	The Ellis Sports Ground	12,000 (2,000 seats)	Workington, Cumbria	12th

Locations of the 2023–24 Counties 1 Cumbria teams

=== League table ===
2023–24 Counties 1 Cumbria
		Played	Won	Drawn	Lost	Points for	Points against	Points diff	Try bonus	Loss bonus	Points	Pts adj
1	Carlisle (P)	17	16	0	1	635	105	485	13	1	80	+2
2	Wigton	17	13	0	4	620	318	302	10	2	66	−2
3	Egremont	18	11	1	6	562	314	248	10	4	60	0
4	St Benedicts	18	13	0	5	351	246	105	6	2	57	−3
5	Whitehaven	18	11	1	6	343	298	45	4	2	54	+2
6	Hawcoat Park	18	11	1	6	325	270	55	7	1	51	−3
7	Penrith II	17	11	0	6	368	311	57	8	1	50	−3
8	Millom	18	4	1	13	317	358	−41	6	5	24	−5
9	Keswick II	18	4	0	14	282	453	−171	4	4	24	0
10	Creighton	17	4	0	13	187	533	−346	2	3	22	+1
11	Aspatria II	17	5	0	12	235	540	−305	5	1	21	−5
12	Windermere	18	3	0	15	244	520	−276	2	5	19	0
13	Workington	17	6	0	11	276	434	−158	7	1	17	−15
If teams are level at any stage, tiebreakers are applied in the following order: 1. Number of matches won 2. Difference between points for and against 3. Total number of points for 4. Aggregate number of points scored in matches between tied teams 5. Number of matches won excluding the first match, then the second and so on until the tie is settled
Green background are the promotion places Updated: 11 November 2025

== 2022–23 ==
This was the first season following the RFU Adult Competition Review. The 2022–23 Counties 1 Cumbria league consists of 12 teams. Eight of these competed in the 2021–22 Cumbria 1 competition; Creighton, Egremont, Hawcoat Park, Millon, Upper Eden, Whitehaven, Wigton and Workington. Cockermouth and St. Benedict's dropped down from North 2 West having finished 7th and 12th respectively. Penrith II joined the league as a new team and Silloth returned to league rugby after not taking part in any competition since the 2019–20 season. A ninth member of the 2021–22 Cumbria 1 league, Furness, had also been assigned to Counties 1 Cumbria but withdrew before the start of the season.

Team	Ground	Capacity	City/Area	Previous season
Cockermouth	Grassmoor Sports Centre		Cockermouth, Cumbria	7th North 2 West
Creighton	Sycamore Lane		Carlisle, Cumbria	9th Cumbria 1
Egremont	Bleach Green		Egremont, Cumbria	4th Cumbria 1
Hawcoat Park	Hawcoat Park		Barrow-in-Furness, Cumbria	5th Cumbria 1
Millom	Wilson Park		Haverigg, Millom, Cumbria	6th Cumbria 1
Penrith II	Winters Park		Penrith, Cumbria	New entry
Silloth	The Jim Brough Rugby Park		Silloth, Cumbria	Re-entry
St. Benedict's	Newlands Avenue		Mirehouse, Whitehaven, Cumbria	12th North 2 West
Upper Eden	Pennine Park		Kirkby Stephen, Cumbria	1st Cumbria 1
Whitehaven	Richmond Terrace		Whitehaven, Cumbria	2nd Cumbria 1
Wigton	Lowmoor Road		Wigton, Cumbria	3rd Cumbria 1
Workington	The Ellis Sports Ground	12,000 (2,000 seats)	Workington, Cumbria	8th Cumbria 1

Locations of the 2022–23 Counties 1 Cumbria teams

=== League table ===
2022–23 Counties 1 Cumbria
		Played	Won	Drawn	Lost	Points for	Points against	Points diff	Try bonus	Loss bonus	Points	Pts adj
1	Upper Eden (P)	11	11	0	0	570	105	465	11	0	55	0
2	Cockermouth (P)	11	9	0	2	328	102	226	8	1	45	0
3	Egremont	11	8	1	2	312	193	119	7	1	42	0
4	Wigton	11	5	1	5	318	295	23	5	2	29	0
5	Whitehaven	11	6	0	5	141	225	−84	2	0	27	+1
6	Millom	10	5	0	5	213	202	11	5	0	26	−1
7	St Benedicts	11	5	0	6	205	282	−77	4	0	24	0
8	Hawcoat Park	11	5	0	6	240	343	−103	7	0	22	−5
9	Siloth	11	3	1	7	163	215	−52	4	3	22	+1
10	Penrith II	10	4	0	6	194	181	13	3	0	19	0
11	Creighton	11	2	1	8	109	339	−230	0	0	10	0
12	Workington	11	0	0	11	140	451	−311	2	1	−2	−5
If teams are level at any stage, tiebreakers are applied in the following order: 1. Number of matches won 2. Difference between points for and against 3. Total number of points for 4. Aggregate number of points scored in matches between tied teams 5. Number of matches won excluding the first match, then the second and so on until the tie is settled
Green background are the promotion places Updated: 11 November 2025

== 2021–22 ==
The teams competing in 2021–22 achieved their places in the league based on performances in 2019–20, the 'previous season' column in the table below refers to that season not 2020–21.

Outgoing teams St Benedicts and Cockermouth were promoted to North 2 West, and Windermere, who finished 12th but did not return, competed in the Cumbria 2 Shield (Group 1) instead. Silloth, who finished 11th, were initially due to compete but withdrew before the season began. Consequently the league was reduced from 13 sides to 9.

Team	Ground	Capacity	City/Area	Previous season
Creighton	Sycamore Lane		Carlisle, Cumbria	13th
Egremont	Bleach Green		Egremont, Cumbria	7th
Furness	The Strawberry Grounds		Barrow-in-Furness, Cumbria	10th
Hawcoat Park	Hawcoat Park		Barrow-in-Furness, Cumbria	6th
Millom	Wilson Park		Haverigg, Millom, Cumbria	9th
Upper Eden	Pennine Park		Kirkby Stephen, Cumbria	5th
Whitehaven	Richmond Terrace		Whitehaven, Cumbria	4th
Wigton	Lowmoor Road		Wigton, Cumbria	3rd
Workington	The Ellis Sports Ground	12,000 (2,000 seats)	Workington, Cumbria	8th

Locations of the 2021–22 Cumbria 1 teams

== 2020–21 ==
=== Participating teams and location ===
On 30 October 2020 the RFU announced that due to the coronavirus pandemic a decision had been taken to cancel Adult Competitive Leagues (National League 1 and below) for the 2020/21 season meaning Cumbria 1 was not contested.

== 2019–20 ==
=== Participating teams and location ===
Team	Ground	Capacity	City/Area	Previous season
Cockermouth	Grassmoor Sports Centre		Cockermouth, Cumbria	3rd
Creighton	Sycamore Lane		Carlisle, Cumbria	Transferred from Cumbria 2 (8th)
Egremont	Bleach Green		Egremont, Cumbria	Transferred from Cumbria 2 (3rd)
Furness	The Strawberry Grounds		Barrow-in-Furness, Cumbria	Transferred from Cumbria 2 (6th)
Hawcoat Park	Hawcoat Park		Barrow-in-Furness, Cumbria	7th
Millom	Wilson Park		Haverigg, Millom, Cumbria	Transferred from Cumbria 2 (7th)
Silloth	The Jim Brough Rugby Park		Silloth, Cumbria	Promoted from Cumbria 2 (champions)
St. Benedict's	Newlands Avenue		Mirehouse, Whitehaven, Cumbria	8th
Upper Eden	Pennine Park		Kirkby Stephen, Cumbria	6th
Whitehaven	Richmond Terrace		Whitehaven, Cumbria	5th
Wigton	Lowmoor Road		Wigton, Cumbria	4th
Windermere	Dawes Meadow		Bowness-on-Windermere, Cumbria	Transferred from Cumbria 2 (4th)
Workington	The Ellis Sports Ground	12,000 (2,000 seats)	Workington, Cumbria	Transferred from Cumbria 2 (2nd)

Locations of the 2019–20 Cumbria 1 teams

== Original teams ==
When this division was introduced in 1992 it contained the following teams:

- Ambleside - transferred from North-West North 1 (8th)
- British Steel - transferred from North-West North 1 (5th)
- Carnforth - transferred from North-West North 1 (4th)
- Creighton - transferred from North-West North 1 (7th)
- Greengarth - joined league system
- Millom - transferred from North-West North 1 (6th)
- Silloth - transferred from North-West North 1 (8th)
- Smith Brothers - transferred from North-West North 1 (3rd)
- Whitehaven - transferred from North-West North 1 (9th)

== Cumbria honours ==
=== Cumbria (1993–1996) ===
The Cumbria league was formed from teams from the old North-West North 1 division when it was disbanded at the end of the 1991–92 season. Promotion was to Cumbria/Lancs North and as the basement division for clubs in the region there was no relegation. Initially a tier 10 league, the creation of National 5 North for the 1993–94 season meant that Cumbria/Lancs North dropped to become a tier 11 league.

Cumbria
Season	No of teams	Champions	Runners–up	Relegated teams
1992–93	9	Smith Brothers	British Steel	No relegation
1993–94	9	Keswick (Note: Due to further restructuring of the league system at the end of the 1993–94 season there was no promotion from the Cumbria division.)	Creighton	No relegation
1994–95	9	Carnforth	Creighton	No relegation
1995–96	9	Ambleside	Whitehaven	No relegation
Green backgrounds are promotion places.

=== Cumbria (1996–2000) ===
The league system was restructured from top to bottom by the Rugby Football Union for the start of the 1996–97 season. The cancellation of National 5 North and creation of North West 3 meant that Cumbria remained a tier 11 league, with promotion into North Lancs/Cumbria (formerly Cumbria/Lancs North).

Cumbria
Season	No of teams	Champions	Runners–up	Relegated teams
1996–97	8	Furness	Whitehaven	No relegation
1997–98	8	Ambleside	Moresby	No relegation
1998–99	8	Millom	Moresby	No relegation
1999–00	8	Moresby (Note: Moresby not promoted due to Cumbria League restructure with division due to increase from 8 to 13 teams for the following season.)	Silloth	No relegation
Green backgrounds are promotion places.

=== Cumbria (2000–2018) ===
Northern league restructuring by the RFU at the end of the 1999–00 season saw the cancellation of North West 1, North West 2 and North West 3 (tiers 7 to 9). This meant that Cumbria became a tier 8 league, with promotion continuing to North Lancs/Cumbria. As the lowest ranked league for clubs in the region there was no relegation until the introduction of Cumbria 2 at the end of the 2017–18 season.

Cumbria 1
Season	No of teams	Champions	Runners–up	Relegated teams
2000–01	13	Hawcoat Park	St. Benedict's	No relegation
2001–02	13	Hawcoat Park	Windermere	No relegation
2002–03	15	Netherhall	Windermere	No relegation
2003–04	13	Egremont (Note: Despite winning the league Egremont had to take part in the promotion playoff against the runners up from North Lancashire 1 which they subsequently won.)	Netherhall	No relegation
2004–05	12	Netherhall	Moresby	No relegation
2005–06	14	Whitehaven	Kirkby Lonsdale (Note: Kirkby Lonsdale were transferred to North Lancs 1 the following season.)	No relegation
2006–07	14	Workington	Keswick	No relegation
2007–08	14	Keswick	Netherhall	No relegation
2008–09	12	Netherhall	St. Benedict's	No relegation
2009–10	10	Whitehaven	Egremont	No relegation
2010–11	9	Millom	Egremont	No relegation
2011–12	10	Keswick	Whitehaven	No relegation
2012–13	10	Hawcoat Park	Silloth	No relegation
2013–14	12	Furness	Egremont	No relegation
2014–15	13	Silloth	Workington	No relegation
2015–16	10	Workington	Egremont	No relegation
2016–17	10	Keswick	Whitehaven	No relegation
2017–18	10	Upper Eden (Note: Due to RFU restructuring of the Cumbria and Lancashire leagues, Upper Eden were not promoted despite finishing as champions.)	Whitehaven	Multiple teams (Note: Due to RFU restructuring of the Cumbria and Lancashire leagues, 7 of the 10 Cumbria League teams were relegated to the new Cumbria 2 division.)
Green backgrounds are promotion places.

=== Cumbria 1 (2018–2019) ===
Restructuring of the north-west leagues at the end of the 2017–18 season, including the cancellation of North Lancs/Cumbria and the introduction of Cumbria 2, meant that Cumbria was renamed to Cumbria and became a tier 7 league. Promotion was now up to North West 1 while relegation was to the new Cumbria 2.

Cumbria 1
Season	No of Teams	Champions	Runners–up	Relegated Teams
2018–19	8	Keswick	Aspatria	No relegation
Green backgrounds are promotion places.

=== Cumbria (2019–2022) ===
After just one season Cumbria 2 was cancelled and Cumbria 1 reverted to being a single division named Cumbria, while the introduction of North 2 West for the 2019–20 season meant that Cumbria dropped back to being a tier 8 league with promotion into this new division and no relegation. Adult community leagues were cancelled for the 2020–21 season. In 2021–22 the league was contested by nine teams and the league restructure meant that no teams were promoted at the end of the season.

Cumbria 1
Season	No of teams	Champions	Runners–up	Relegated teams
2019–20	13 (Note: The cancellation of Cumbria 2 saw the league expand from 8 to 13 teams.)	St. Benedict's	Cockermouth	No relegation
2020–21	13	Cancelled due to COVID-19 pandemic in the United Kingdom.		
2021–22	9	Upper Eden	Whitehaven	No relegation
Green backgrounds are promotion places.

=== Counties 1 Cumbria (2022–present) ===
Following the RFU Adult Competition Review, Counties 1 Cumbria reverted to a level 7 league, with promotion to Regional 2 North. There is no relegation.

Counties 1 Cumbria
Season	No of teams	Champions	Runner-up	Last placed team	Ref
2022–23	12	Upper Eden	Cockermouth	Workington	
2023–24	13	Carlisle	Wigton	Workington	
2024–25	13	Wigton	Penrith II	Windermere	
2025-26	14	Kirkby Lonsdale	Hawcoat Park	Millom	
Green background is the promotion place(s).

== Promotion play-offs ==
From the 2018–19 season onwards there was a play-off between the runners-up of Cumbria 1 and North 2 West for the third and final promotion place to North 1 West. Previously Cumbria League sides had a play-off against Lancashire (North) for a place in the discontinued North Lancashire/Cumbria division (see following sub section). As of 2019–20 North 2 West sides have one win to Cumbria's zero; and the home side has one win to the away side's zero.

Cumbria 1 v North 2 West promotion play-off results
Season	Home team	Score	Away team	Venue	Attendance
2018–19	Bowdon (LC)	HWO (Note: Bowdon won the 2018–19 promotion playoff by default as Aspatria were unwilling to take part.)	Aspatria (C) (Note: Despite losing the playoff, Aspatria would later also be promoted due to the restructuring of the northern leagues.)	Clay Lane, Timperley, Altrincham, Greater Manchester	N/A
2019–20	Cancelled due to COVID-19 pandemic in the United Kingdom. Both runners up – Cockermouth (C) and Glossop (NW) – promoted.				

=== Discontinued promotion play-offs ===
Between the 2000–01 and 2016–17 seasons there was a play-off between the runners-up of the Cumbria League and Lancashire (North) for the third and final promotion place to North Lancashire/Cumbria. The team with the superior league record has home advantage in the tie. At the end of the 2016–17 season the Lancashire (North) teams have been the most successful with eleven wins to the Cumbria League team's four; and the home team has won promotion on twelve occasions compared to the away team's three. Since the cancellation of Lancashire (North) the play-off has been discontinued.

Cumbria League v Lancashire (North) promotion play-off results
Season	Home team	Score	Away team	Venue	Attendance
2000–01	Tyldesley (L)	47-26	Hawcoat Park (C) (Note: Despite finishing at the top of the 2000-01 Cumbrian League according to the RFU website, Hawcoat Park actually went into the playoff rather than runners up St. Benedict's. Reasons for this are not clear, although St. Benedict's did play one less game than Hawcoat Park and were level on points but with a weaker for/against record, so maybe an average points total was used to determine the champions.)	St George's Park, Tyldesley, Manchester	
2001–02	Bury (L)	20-3	Windermere (C)	Bury Sports Club, Bury, Greater Manchester	
2002–03	Didsbury Toc H (L)	17-29	Upper Eden (C) (Note: Despite finished third in the 2002-03 Cumbrian League, Upper Eden went into the promotion playoff as champions Netherall were not promoted, with second placed Windermere going up instead.)	Ford Lane, Didsbury, Manchester	
2003–04	Egremont (C) (Note: Despite winning the 2003-04 Cumbrian League, Egremont had to take part in the promotion playoff usually reserved for league runners up.)	27-19	Didsbury Toc H (L)	Bleach Green, Egremont, Cumbria	
2004–05	Burnage (L)	60-0	Moresby (C)	Varley Park, Stockport, Greater Manchester	
2005–06	Kirkby Lonsdale (C)	20-23	Didsbury Toc H (L)	Raygarth, Kirkby Lonsdale, Cumbria	
2006–07	Tarleton (L)	28-7	Keswick (C)	Carr Lane, Tarleton, Lancashire	
2007–08	Netherhall (C)	0-20	Burnley (L)	Netherhall Road, Maryport, Cumbria	
2008–09	No promotion playoff (Note: Due to changes to English rugby union league system by the RFU there would be no promotion playoff at the end of 2008-09 season. Instead the champions and runners up from both leagues would be automatically promoted.)				
2009–10	Didsbury Toc H (L)	42-10	Millom (C) (Note: Despite finishing the 2009-10 Cumbrian League in third place, Millom went into the promotion playoff game instead of runners up Egremont. Millom had actually played two less games and were only two points off the runner up spot so this may explain why they qualified for the playoff.)	Ford Lane, Didsbury, Manchester	
2010–11	Egremont (C)	19-18	Trafford MV (L)	Bleach Green, Egremont, Cumbria	
2011–12	Whitehaven (C)	33-22	Trafford MV (L)	The Playground, Whitehaven, Cumbria	
2012–13	Bolton (L)	27-7	Silloth (C)	Avenue Street, Bolton, Greater Manchester	
2013–14	No promotion playoff (Note: Due to restructuring of the north-west leagues by the RFU there would be no promotion playoff at the end of 2013-14 season. Instead the champions and runners up from both leagues would be automatically promoted.)				
2014–15	Ashton-under-Lyne (L)	17-5	Workington (C)	Gambrel Bank, Ashton-under-Lyne, Greater Manchester	
2015–16	Littleborough (L)	37-3	Egremont (C)	Rakewood Road, Littleborough, Rochdale, Greater Manchester	
2016–17	Burnley (L)	94-0	Whitehaven (C)	Holden Road, Burnley, Lancashire	
Green background is the promoted team. C = Cumbria League and L = Lancashire (North) (formerly North Lancashire 1)

== Number of league titles ==
- Keswick (5)
- Hawcoat Park (3)
- Netherhall (3)
- Upper Eden (3)
- Ambleside (2)
- Furness (2)
- Millom (2)
- Whitehaven (2)
- Workington (2)
- Carlisle (1)
- Carnforth (1)
- Egremont (1)
- Moresby (1)
- Kirkby Lonsdale (1)
- Silloth (1)
- Smith Brothers (1)
- St. Benedict's (1)
- Wigton (1)

== See also ==
- Cumbria RU
- RFU Intermediate Cup
- English rugby union system
- Rugby union in England
