= Aspatria RUFC =

English rugby union football club

(England) Aspatria
- Full name: Aspatria Rugby Union Football Club
- Union: Cumbria RU
- Founded: 1875; 151 years ago
- Location: Aspatria, Cumbria, England
- Ground: Bower Park (Capacity: 4,000 (300 seats))
- Chairman: Melvyn Hanley
- President: Alan Bowes
- Captain: Chris Graham 2025/26
- League: Regional 2 North
- 2025-26: 11th
Team kit

Official website
- www.pitchero.com/clubs/aspatria/

Aspatria Rugby Union Football Club is an English rugby union club based in Aspatria, Cumbria (formerly Cumberland) in north west England, not far from the Scottish Border. They are nicknamed the "Black Reds", and have a red cockerel as their logo. They currently play in Regional 2 North – a tier 6 league in the English rugby union system – following reorganisation of the league system and their transfer from Durham/Northumberland 1 in 2021–22.

They are not to be confused with the Aspatria Hornets, the local rugby league team.

== Honours ==
1st team:

- Cumbria Cup winners (32): 1883, 1885, 1891, 1892, 1896, 1899, 1909, 1911, 1912, 1923, 1928, 1929, 1930, 1937, 1938, 1977, 1978, 1980, 1981, 1982, 1983, 1984, 1985, 1987, 1988, 1989, 1990, 1992, 1993, 1996, 1999, 2013
- North 2 champions: 1987–88
- North 1 champions: 1990–91
- Courage National Division 4 North champions: 1991–92
- North Lancs/Cumbria champions: 2010–11
- Cumbria League Cup winners 2018–19

2nd team:

- Cumbria Shield winners (17): 1907, 1922, 1924, 1925, 1929, 1930, 1933, 1938, 1981, 1982, 1983, 1993, 1994, 1999, 2002, 2006, 2017

== Notable players ==
Aspatria has produced several international / representative players:

- Joseph Blacklock
- James Davidson
- Joseph Davidson
- David Graham
- Steve Hanley
- Thomas Holliday, seven England caps, 1924 British Lions tour to South Africa, and later rugby league player for Oldham R.L.F.C. and the England national rugby league team.
- Robert Jackson Hanvey
- Rob Miller now plays for London Wasps. He is the top try scorer in the Aviva Premiership 2011/2012 season and was called up to the England Saxons 05/07/2012 by head coach Stuart Lancaster but subsequently lost his place before the 2013 Six Nations competition.
- David Pears England International.
- Mark Richardson represented Barbarian F. C. 1997 v Leicester Tigers

== Bibliography ==
- Terry Carrick (1995). Aspatria: The History Of A Rugby Union Football Club. Nottingham: Adland Press.
