= Whitehaven RUFC =

English rugby union club, based in Whitehaven, Cumbria

(England) Whitehaven
- Full name: Whitehaven Rugby Union Football Club
- Union: Cumbria RU
- Nickname: Haven
- Founded: 1877; 149 years ago
- Location: Whitehaven, Cumbria, England
- Ground: The Playground
- Coach(es): Callum Rowlandson; Craig Hodgson
- Captain: Adam Rothery
- League: Counties 1 Cumbria
- 2025-26: 5th
Team kit

Official website
- www.pitchero.com/clubs/whitehavenrufc/

Whitehaven Rugby Union Football Club is an amateur rugby union club based in Whitehaven, in West Cumbria, where they play at The Playground. They currently play in the RFU's Counties 1 Cumbria, a competitive league at Tier 7 in the English Rugby Union System.

== Honours ==
1st team:

- Cumbria Cup winners (4): 1884, 1914, 1963, 1969
- Cumbria League champions (2): 2005–06, 2009–10
- Cumbria Cup Plate winners: 2010
- Cumbria League v Lancashire (North) promotion play-off winners: 2011–12
- Cumbria League Cup winners: 2018

2nd team:

- Cumbria Shield winners (5): 1912, 1932, 1963, 1968, 2019

== See also ==
- Cumbria Rugby Union
