= Counties 1 ADM Lancashire & Cheshire =

English rugby union division

Counties 1 adm Lancashire & Cheshire
- Current season or competition: 2025–26 Counties 1 adm Lancashire & Cheshire
- Sport: Rugby union
- Instituted: 2022
- Number of teams: 12
- Country: England
- Holders: West Park St Helens (2024–25)
- Most titles: Three teams (1 title)
- Website: England Rugby
- Promotion to: Regional 2 North West
- Relegation to: Counties 2 ADM Lancashire & Cheshire

Counties 1 adm Lancashire & Cheshire is an English rugby union division, the seventh tier of the domestic competition, and the top level for local rugby union in parts of Lancashire and Cheshire. West Park St Helens are the current champions.

== Format ==
The champions are promoted to Regional 2 North West. The number of teams relegated depends on feedback following promotion and relegation in the leagues above, but is usually to Counties 2 ADM Lancashire & Cheshire.

The season runs from September to April and comprises twenty-two rounds of matches, with each club playing each of its rivals, home and away. The results of the matches contribute points to the league as follows:

- 4 points are awarded for a win
- 2 points are awarded for a draw
- 0 points are awarded for a loss, however
- 1 losing (bonus) point is awarded to a team that loses a match by 7 points or fewer
- 1 additional (bonus) point is awarded to a team scoring 4 tries or more in a match.

== 2026–27 ==
Departing were Wilmslow and Warrington promoted to Regional 2 North West while Aspull (11th) and Trafford MV RFCC (12th) were relegated to Counties 2 ADM Lancashire & Cheshire.

Team	Ground	Capacity	City/Area	Previous season
Aldwinians	Audenshaw Park		Audenshaw, Greater Manchester	3rd
Altrincham Kersal	Stelfox Avenue		Timperley, Altrincham, Greater Manchester	Relegated from Regional 2 North West (12th)
Bolton	Avenue Street		Bolton, Greater Manchester	Promoted from Counties 2 ADM Lancashire & Cheshire (2nd)
Broughton Park	Hough End		Chorlton-cum-Hardy, Manchester	7th
Didsbury Toc H	Ford Lane		Didsbury, Manchester, Greater Manchester	5th
Eccles	Gorton Street		Eccles, Greater Manchester	4th
Liverpool St Helens	Moss Lane	4,370 (370 seats)	St. Helens, Lancashire	10th
New Brighton	Hartsfield	2,000	Moreton, Merseyside	6th
Southport	Recreation Ground	3,500	Southport, Merseyside	Promoted from Counties 2 ADM Lancashire & Cheshire (champions)
Tarleton	Carr Lane		Tarleton, Lancashire	8th
Warrington	Grappenhall Village Sports Club		Walton, Warrington, Cheshire	
West Park St Helens	Red Rocks		St. Helens, Lancashire	Relegated from Regional 2 North West (11th)
Wigan	Douglas Valley		Wigan, Greater Manchester	9th

Locations of the 2026–27 Counties 1 ADM Lancashire & Cheshire teams
Locations of the 2026-27 Counties 1 ADM Lancashire & Cheshire teams in Greater Manchester

== 2025–26 ==
Departing were West Park St Helens promoted to Regional 2 North West while Heaton Moor (11th) and Glossop (12th) were relegated.

Team	Ground	Capacity	City/Area	Previous season
Aldwinians	Audenshaw Park		Audenshaw, Greater Manchester	5th
Aspull	Wood Lane		Aspull, Greater Manchester	10th
Broughton Park	Hough End		Chorlton-cum-Hardy, Manchester	6th
Didsbury Toc H	Ford Lane		Didsbury, Manchester, Greater Manchester	3rd
Eccles	Gorton Street		Eccles, Greater Manchester	Relegated from Regional 2 North West (12th)
Liverpool St Helens	Moss Lane	4,370 (370 seats)	St. Helens, Lancashire	7th
New Brighton	Hartsfield	2,000	Moreton, Merseyside	8th
Tarleton	Carr Lane		Tarleton, Lancashire	2nd
Trafford MV RFCC	MacPherson Park		Trafford, Greater Manchester	9th
Warrington	Grappenhall Village Sports Club		Walton, Warrington, Cheshire	Promoted from Counties 2 ADM Lancashire & Cheshire (2nd)
Wigan	Douglas Valley		Wigan, Greater Manchester	Promoted from Counties 2 ADM Lancashire & Cheshire (champions)
Wilmslow	Memorial Ground		Wilmslow, Cheshire	4th

Locations of the 2025–26 Counties 1 ADM Lancashire & Cheshire teams
Locations of the 2025–26 Counties 1 ADM Lancashire & Cheshire teams in Greater Manchester

== 2024–25 ==
=== Participating teams and location ===
Departing were the champions Widnes, and runner-up Eccles, both promoted to Regional 2 North West. Warrington (11th) and Bolton (12th) were relegated to Counties 2 ADM Lancashire & Cheshire. Joining were Liverpool St Helens (12th), relegated from Regional 2 North West and Glossop (12th), relegated from Regional 2 North East. Also coming in were Trafford MV and New Brighton, both promoted from Counties 2 ADM Lancashire & Cheshire.

Team	Ground	Capacity	City/Area	Previous season
Aldwinians	Audenshaw Park		Audenshaw, Greater Manchester	3rd
Aspull	Wood Lane		Aspull, Greater Manchester	9th
Broughton Park	Hough End		Chorlton-cum-Hardy, Manchester	6th
Didsbury Toc H	Ford Lane		Didsbury, Manchester, Greater Manchester	8th
Glossop	Hargate Hill Lane		Charlesworth, Glossop, Derbyshire	Relegated from Regional 2 North East (12th)
Heaton Moor	Green Lane		Heaton Moor, Stockport, Greater Manchester	10th
Liverpool St Helens	Moss Lane	4,370 (370 seats)	St. Helens, Lancashire	Relegated from Regional 2 North West (12th)
New Brighton	Hartsfield	2,000	Moreton, Merseyside	Promoted from Counties 2 ADM Lancashire & Cheshire (2nd)
Tarleton	Carr Lane		Tarleton, Lancashire	7th
Trafford MV RFCC	MacPherson Park		Trafford, Greater Manchester	Promoted from Counties 2 ADM Lancashire & Cheshire (champions)
West Park St Helens	Red Rocks		St. Helens, Lancashire	5th
Wilmslow	Memorial Ground		Wilmslow, Cheshire	4th

Locations of the 2024–25 Counties 1 ADM Lancashire & Cheshire teams
Locations of the 2024–25 Counties 1 ADM Lancashire & Cheshire teams in Greater Manchester

=== League table ===
2024–25 Counties 1 adm Lancashire & Cheshire
		Played	Won	Drawn	Lost	Points for	Points against	Points diff	Try bonus	Loss bonus	Points	Pts adj
1	West Park St Helens (P)	22	19	0	3	708	417	291	16	2	94	0
2	Tarleton	22	18	0	4	681	416	265	12	3	87	0
3	Didsbury Toc H	22	18	0	4	635	366	269	11	3	86	0
4	Wilmslow	22	15	0	7	631	410	221	14	4	78	0
5	Aldwinians	22	12	0	10	589	440	149	10	7	65	0
6	Broughton Park	22	9	1	12	505	486	19	6	5	49	0
7	Liverpool St Helens	22	9	0	13	483	604	−121	10	2	48	0
8	New Brighton	22	8	0	14	488	673	−185	9	4	45	0
9	Trafford MV 3	22	7	0	15	568	878	−310	13	4	45	0
10	Aspull	22	8	0	14	548	629	−81	9	3	44	0
11	Heaton Moor (R)	22	6	1	15	534	692	−158	13	3	42	0
12	Glossop (R)	22	2	0	20	365	724	−359	2	4	−1	−15
If teams are level at any stage, tiebreakers are applied in the following order: 1. Number of matches won 2. Difference between points for and against 3. Total number of points for 4. Aggregate number of points scored in matches between tied teams 5. Number of matches won excluding the first match, then the second and so on until the tie is settled
Green background is the promotion place. Pink background are the relegation places. Updated: 9 November 2025

== 2023–24 ==
=== Participating teams and location ===
Departing were Liverpool St Helens promoted to Regional 2 North West. Southport, Sefton and Leigh were relegated to Counties 2 ADM Lancashire & Cheshire. Joining were Broughton Park and Wilmslow, relegated from Regional 2 North West. Eccles were promoted from Counties 2 ADM Lancashire & Cheshire along with Heaton Moor.

Team	Ground	Capacity	City/Area	Previous season
Aldwinians	Audenshaw Park		Audenshaw, Greater Manchester	7th
Aspull	Wood Lane		Aspull, Greater Manchester	8th
Bolton	Avenue Street		Bolton, Greater Manchester	9th
Broughton Park	Hough End		Chorlton-cum-Hardy, Manchester	Relegated from Regional 2 North West (11th)
Didsbury Toc H	Ford Lane		Didsbury, Manchester, Greater Manchester	2nd
Eccles	Gorton Street		Eccles, Greater Manchester	Promoted from Counties 2 ADM Lancashire & Cheshire (champions)
Heaton Moor	Green Lane		Heaton Moor, Stockport, Greater Manchester	Promoted from Counties 2 ADM Lancashire & Cheshire (2nd)
Tarleton	Carr Lane		Tarleton, Lancashire	3rd
Warrington	The Fortress		Walton, Warrington, Cheshire	5th
West Park St Helens	Red Rocks		St. Helens, Lancashire	6th
Widnes	Heath Road		Widnes, Cheshire	4th
Wilmslow	Memorial Ground		Wilmslow, Cheshire	Relegated from Regional 2 North West (12th)

Locations of the 2023–24 Counties 1 ADM Lancashire & Cheshire teams
Locations of the 2023–24 Counties 1 ADM Lancashire & Cheshire teams in Greater Manchester

=== League table ===
2023–24 Counties 1 adm Lancashire & Cheshire
		Played	Won	Drawn	Lost	Points for	Points against	Points diff	Try bonus	Loss bonus	Points	Pts adj
1	Widnes (P)	22	20	0	2	767	360	407	15	0	95	0
2	Eccles (P)	22	18	1	3	729	376	353	16	2	93	−1
3	Aldwinians	22	16	0	6	595	391	204	13	3	81	−1
4	Wilmslow	22	14	2	6	527	366	161	9	0	70	−1
5	West Park St Helens	22	12	1	9	467	408	59	10	6	64	−2
6	Broughton Park	22	10	1	11	563	500	63	8	4	54	0
7	Tarleton	22	10	1	11	478	436	42	7	5	54	0
8	Didsbury Toc H	22	9	1	12	585	531	54	7	6	51	0
9	Aspull	22	8	3	11	433	488	−55	6	4	46	−2
10	Heaton Moor	22	4	0	18	450	800	−350	11	6	33	0
11	Warrington (R)	22	4	0	8	387	827	−440	4	5	25	0
12	Bolton (R)	22	2	0	20	310	847	−537	5	3	16	0
If teams are level at any stage, tiebreakers are applied in the following order: 1. Number of matches won 2. Difference between points for and against 3. Total number of points for 4. Aggregate number of points scored in matches between tied teams 5. Number of matches won excluding the first match, then the second and so on until the tie is settled
Green background are the promotion places. Pink background are the relegation places. Updated: 8 November 2025

== 2022–23 ==
=== Participating teams and location ===
This was the first season following the RFU Adult Competition Review. The league had some similarities to North 2 West with five teams returning; of the remainder, four were promoted – three to Regional 2 North West (Anselmians, Rochdale and Winnington Park ) and one (Keswick) to Regional 2 North – whilst two were level transferred to Counties 1 Cumbria (Cockermouth and St. Benedict's), and one dropped to Counties 2 ADM Lancashire & Cheshire (Orrell).

The remaining places were taken by five teams returning from the ADM Premier Division and two from the ADM Championship – two of the Lancashire RFU breakaway leagues formed in 2018–19.

Team	Ground	Capacity	City/Area	Previous season
Aldwinians	Audenshaw Park		Audenshaw, Greater Manchester	5th ADM Premier Division
Aspull	Wood Lane		Aspull, Greater Manchester	1st ADM Championship
Bolton	Avenue Street		Bolton, Greater Manchester	10th North 2 West
Didsbury Toc H	Ford Lane		Didsbury, Manchester, Greater Manchester	1st ADM Premier Division
Leigh	Round Ash Park		Leigh, Greater Manchester	8th North 2 West
Liverpool St Helens	Moss Lane	4,370 (370 seats)	St. Helens, Lancashire	4th ADM Premier Division
Sefton	Thornhead Lane		Liverpool, Merseyside	2nd ADM Championship
Southport	Recreation Ground	3,500	Southport, Merseyside	9th North 2 West
Tarleton	Carr Lane		Tarleton, Lancashire	6th North 2 West
Warrington	The Fortress		Walton, Warrington, Cheshire	5th North 2 West
West Park St Helens	Red Rocks		St. Helens, Lancashire	3rd ADM Premier Division
Widnes	Heath Road		Widnes, Cheshire	2nd ADM Premier Division

Locations of the 2022–23 Counties 1 ADM Lancashire & Cheshire teams

=== League table ===
2022–23 Counties 1 adm Lancashire & Cheshire
		Played	Won	Drawn	Lost	Points for	Points against	Points diff	Try bonus	Loss bonus	Points	Pts adj
1	Liverpool St Helens (P)	22	17	1	4	657	402	255	10	3	83	0
2	Didsbury Toc H	22	16	1	5	643	374	269	12	1	79	0
3	Tarleton	22	15	0	7	554	373	181	11	7	79	+1
4	Widnes	22	14	0	8	644	442	202	13	3	72	0
5	Warrington	22	12	0	10	549	577	−28	12	3	63	0
6	West Park St Helens	22	11	1	10	435	390	45	7	3	56	0
7	Aldwinians	22	11	0	11	454	440	14	7	3	55	+1
8	Aspull	22	10	1	11	538	586	−48	9	4	55	0
9	Bolton	22	8	1	13	478	508	−30	4	5	38	−5
10	Southport (R)	22	7	0	15	421	670	−249	7	1	36	0
11	Sefton (R)	22	4	1	17	442	712	−270	7	4	29	0
12	Leigh (R)	22	4	0	18	357	698	−341	3	4	23	0
If teams are level at any stage, tiebreakers are applied in the following order: 1. Number of matches won 2. Difference between points for and against 3. Total number of points for 4. Aggregate number of points scored in matches between tied teams 5. Number of matches won excluding the first match, then the second and so on until the tie is settled
Green background is the promotion place Pink background are the relegation places Updated: 8 November 2025

== Counties 1 adm Lancashire & Cheshire honours ==
List of Counties 1 adm Lancashire & Cheshire honours
Season	No of teams	Champions	Runner-up	Relegated team(s)	Ref
2022–23	12	Liverpool St Helens	Didsbury Toc H	Southport (10th), Sefton (11th) and Leigh (12th)	
2023–24	12	Widnes	Eccles	Warrington (11th) and Bolton (12th)	
2024–25	12	West Park St Helens	Tarleton	Heaton Moor (11th) and Glossop (12th)	
Green background is the promotion place(s).

== Number of league titles ==
- Liverpool St Helens (1)
- Widnes (1)
- West Park St Helens (1)

== See also ==
- Cheshire RFU
- Lancashire RFU
- English rugby union system
- Rugby union in England
