= Lancs/Cheshire Division One =

English Rugby Union league

Counties 2 ADM Lancashire & Cheshire
- Current season or competition: 2024-25 Counties 2 ADM Lancashire & Cheshire
- Sport: Rugby union
- Instituted: 1987; 39 years ago
- Country: England, Isle of Man
- Most titles: Altrincham Kersal, Warrington (3 titles)
- Website: England RFU

Counties 2 ADM Lancashire & Cheshire (formerly Lancs/Cheshire Division 1) is a regional English Rugby Union league for teams from Cheshire, Merseyside, Lancashire and Greater Manchester, ranked at tier 8 of the English league system.

The division was initially known as North-West West 1 when it was created in 1987, and had a number of different names with South Lancs/Cheshire 1 being the longest running. The division switched to its final name for the 2018–19 season due to the restructuring of the northern leagues by the Rugby Football Union (RFU) as a result of 19 Lancashire clubs withdrawing from RFU competitions across the leagues to form their own competitions. This would see the North Lancashire/Cumbria division abolished, with Lancashire-based sides from that league being transferred into Lancs/Cheshire 1, while the Cumbria sides were transferred into Cumbria 1.

The introduction of North 2 West for the 2019–20 season at tier 7 of the north west leagues, meant that Lancs/Cheshire Division 1 dropped down to being a tier 8 league. Then after the cancellation of Adult Competitive Leagues (National League 1 and below) for the 2020/21 season due to the coronavirus pandemic, the league was disbanded with teams transferred into the Lancashire Merit Table competitions or ADM Lancashire leagues.

After a hiatus for season 2021-22 the league returned in its new guise following the restructuring of the English rugby union system ahead of the 2022–23 season, with the league renamed to Counties 2 ADM Lancashire & Cheshire.

Promotion is to Counties 1 ADM Lancashire & Cheshire and relegation to Counties 3 ADM Lancashire & Cheshire.

== Participating clubs 2026-27 ==
Departing were Southport and Bolton, promoted to Counties 1 ADM Lancashire & Cheshire. There was no relegation as the league was restored to twelve clubs.

Team	Ground	Capacity	City/Area	Previous season
Aspull	Wood Lane		Aspull, Greater Manchester	Relegated from Counties 1 ADM Lancashire & Cheshire (11th)
Fleetwood	Melbourne Avenue		Fleetwood, Lancashire	Promoted from Counties 3 ADM Lancashire & Cheshire (champions)
Garstang	Hudson Park		Garstang, Lancashire	7th
Glossop	Hargate Hill Lane		Charlesworth, Glossop, Derbyshire	6th
Heaton Moor	Green Lane		Heaton Moor, Stockport, Greater Manchester	4th
Leigh	Round Ash Park		Leigh, Greater Manchester	10th
Littleborough	Rakewood Road		Littleborough, Greater Manchester	3rd
Liverpool Collegiate	Aigburth Cricket Ground		Aigburth, Liverpool, Merseyside	8th
Orrell	St John Rigby College		Orrell, Greater Manchester	Promoted from Counties 3 ADM Lancashire & Cheshire (3rd - play off winners)
Sefton	Thornhead Lane		Liverpool, Merseyside	9th
Trafford MV RFCC	MacPherson Park		Trafford, Greater Manchester	Relegated from Counties 1 ADM Lancashire & Cheshire (12th)
Tyldesley	St Georges Park		Tyldesley, Greater Manchester	5th

Locations of the 2026-27 Counties 2 ADM Lancashire & Cheshire teams
Locations of the 2026-27-Counties 2 ADM Lancashire & Cheshire teams in Greater Manchester

== Participating clubs 2025-26 ==
Departing were Wigan and Warrington, promoted to Counties 1 ADM Lancashire & Cheshire while Oldham and Hoylake were relegated to Counties 3 ADM Lancashire & Cheshire.

Thornton-Cleveleys (8th in 2024-25) did not return for the new season.

De La Salle (Salford) withdrew in March 2026 as a consequence of a merger with the reborn Salford RLFC that established De La Salle as the professional team's official rugby union feeder side.

Team	Ground	Capacity	City/Area	Previous season
Bolton	Avenue Street		Bolton, Greater Manchester	6th
De La Salle (Salford)	De La Salle Sports & Social Club		Salford, Greater Manchester	Promoted from Counties 3 ADM Lancashire & Cheshire
Garstang	Hudson Park		Garstang, Lancashire	Promoted from Counties 3 ADM Lancashire & Cheshire
Glossop	Hargate Hill Lane		Charlesworth, Glossop, Derbyshire	Relegated from Counties 1 ADM Lancashire & Cheshire
Heaton Moor	Green Lane		Heaton Moor, Stockport, Greater Manchester	Relegated from Counties 1 ADM Lancashire & Cheshire
Leigh	Round Ash Park		Leigh, Greater Manchester	9th
Littleborough	Rakewood Road		Littleborough, Greater Manchester	3rd
Liverpool Collegiate	Aigburth Cricket Ground		Aigburth, Liverpool, Merseyside	10th
Sefton	Thornhead Lane		Liverpool, Merseyside	7th
Southport	Recreation Ground	3,500	Southport, Merseyside	4th
Tyldesley	St Georges Park		Tyldesley, Greater Manchester	5th

Locations of the 2025-26 Counties 2 ADM Lancashire & Cheshire teams
Locations of the 2025-26-Counties 2 ADM Lancashire & Cheshire teams in Greater Manchester

== Participating clubs 2024-25 ==
Departing were Trafford MV RFCC and New Brighton, promoted to Counties 1 ADM Lancashire & Cheshire while Fleetwood and De LaSalle (Salford) were relegated to Counties 3 ADM Lancashire & Cheshire.

Joining were Bolton and Warrington, relegated from Counties 1 ADM Lancashire & Cheshire. Wigan and Thornton-Cleveleys were promoted from Counties 3 ADM Lancashire & Cheshire

Team	Ground	Capacity	City/Area	Previous season
Bolton	Avenue Street		Bolton, Greater Manchester	Relegated from Counties 1 ADM Lancashire & Cheshire
Hoylake	Carham Road		Hoylake, Merseyside	8th
Leigh	Round Ash Park		Leigh, Greater Manchester	7th
Littleborough	Rakewood Road		Littleborough, Greater Manchester	6th
Liverpool Collegiate	Aigburth Cricket Ground		Aigburth, Liverpool, Merseyside	9th
Oldham	Manor Park		Oldham, Greater Manchester	10th
Sefton	Thornhead Lane		Liverpool, Merseyside	5th
Southport	Recreation Ground	3,500	Southport, Merseyside	3rd
Thornton-Cleveleys	Thornton Sports Centre		Thornton, Lancashire	Promoted from Counties 3 ADM Lancashire & Cheshire
Tyldesley	St Georges Park		Tyldesley, Greater Manchester	4th
Warrington	The Fortress		Walton, Warrington, Cheshire	Relegated from Counties 1 ADM Lancashire & Cheshire
Wigan	Douglas Valley		Wigan, Greater Manchester	Promoted from Counties 3 ADM Lancashire & Cheshire

Locations of the 2024-25 Counties 2 ADM Lancashire & Cheshire teams
Locations of the 2024-25-Counties 2 ADM Lancashire & Cheshire teams in Greater Manchester

== Participating clubs 2023-24 ==
Joining were Southport, Sefton and Leigh, all relegated from Counties 1 ADM Lancashire & Cheshire. New Brighton and Hoylake and were promoted from Counties 3 ADM Lancashire & Cheshire

At the end of the season, New Brighton and Trafford MV RFCC were promoted to Counties 1 ADM Lancashire & Cheshire. Fleetwood and De La Salle (Salford) were relegated to Counties 3 ADM Lancashire & Cheshire.

Team	Ground	Capacity	City/Area	Previous season
De La Salle (Salford)	De La Salle Sports & Social Club		Salford, Greater Manchester	8th
Fleetwood	Melbourne Avenue		Fleetwood, Lancashire	7th
Hoylake	Carham Road		Hoylake, Merseyside	Promoted from Counties 3 ADM Lancashire & Cheshire
Leigh	Round Ash Park		Leigh, Greater Manchester	Relegated from Counties 1 ADM Lancashire & Cheshire
Littleborough	Rakewood Road		Littleborough, Greater Manchester	4th
Liverpool Collegiate	Aigburth Cricket Ground		Aigburth, Liverpool, Merseyside	6th
New Brighton	Hartsfield		Moreton, Merseyside	Promoted from Counties 3 ADM Lancashire & Cheshire
Oldham	Manor Park		Oldham, Greater Manchester	9th
Sefton	Thornhead Lane		Liverpool, Merseyside	Relegated from Counties 1 ADM Lancashire & Cheshire
Southport	Recreation Ground	3,500	Southport, Merseyside	Relegated from Counties 1 ADM Lancashire & Cheshire
Trafford MV RFCC	MacPherson Park		Trafford, Greater Manchester	3rd
Tyldesley	St Georges Park		Tyldesley, Greater Manchester	5th

Locations of the 2023-24 Counties 2 ADM Lancashire & Cheshire teams
Locations of the 2023-24 Counties 2 ADM Lancashire & Cheshire teams in Greater Manchester

== Participating clubs 2022–23 ==
This was the first season following the RFU Adult Competition Review with the league adopting its new name of Counties 2 ADM Lancashire & Cheshire. At the end of the season, Eccles and Heaton Moor were promoted to Counties 1 ADM Lancashire & Cheshire. Ormskirk (10th), Wigan (11th) and Orrell were relegated to Counties 3 ADM Lancashire & Cheshire.

Team	Ground	Capacity	City/Area	Previous season
De La Salle (Salford)	De La Salle Sports & Social Club		Salford, Greater Manchester	
Eccles	Gorton Street		Eccles, Greater Manchester	
Fleetwood	Melbourne Avenue		Fleetwood, Lancashire	
Heaton Moor	Green Lane		Heaton Moor, Stockport, Greater Manchester	
Littleborough	Rakewood Road		Littleborough, Greater Manchester	
Liverpool Collegiate	Aigburth Cricket Ground	3,000	Aigburth, Liverpool, Merseyside	
Oldham	Manor Park		Oldham, Greater Manchester	
Ormskirk	Green Lane		Ormskirk, Lancashire	
Orrell	St John Rigby College		Orrell, Greater Manchester	
Trafford MV RFCC	MacPherson Park		Trafford, Greater Manchester	
Tyldesley	St Georges Park		Tyldesley, Greater Manchester	
Wigan	Douglas Valley		Wigan, Greater Manchester	

Locations of the 2022-23 Counties 2 ADM Lancashire & Cheshire teams
Locations of the 2022-23 Counties 2 ADM Lancashire & Cheshire teams in Greater Manchester

== Season 2021-22 ==
Not contested as many of the Lancashire RFU affiliated clubs had joined the Lancashire ADM splinter leagues.

== Season 2020–21 ==
On 30 October the RFU announced that a decision had been taken to cancel Adult Competitive Leagues (National League 1 and below) for the 2020/21 season meaning the league was not contested.

== Teams 2019–20 ==
Team	Ground	Capacity	City/Area	Previous season
Birchfield	Birchfield Road		Widnes, Cheshire	5th
Congleton	Congleton Park		Congleton, Cheshire	4th
Ellesmere Port	Whitby Sports & Social Club		Ellesmere Port, Cheshire	Promoted from Lancs/Cheshire 3 (runners up)
Garstang	Hudson Park		Garstang, Lancashire	8th
Hoylake	Carham Road		Hoylake, Merseyside	Relegated from Lancs/Cheshire 1 (12th)
New Brighton	Hartsfield	2,000	Moreton, Merseyside	7th
Orrell	St John Rigby College		Orrell, Greater Manchester	3rd
Ramsey	Mooragh Park		Ramsey, Isle of Man	Promoted from Lancs/Cheshire 3 (champions)

Locations of the 2019–20 Lancs/Cheshire Division 1 teams

== Teams 2018–19 ==
Team	Ground	Capacity	City/Area	Previous season
Altrincham Kersal	Stelfox Avenue		Timperley, Altrincham, Greater Manchester	Relegated from North 1 West (12th)
Bolton	Avenue Street		Bolton, Greater Manchester	Transferred from North Lancashire/Cumbria (3rd)
Bowdon	Clay Lane		Timperley, Altrincham, Greater Manchester	5th
Fleetwood	Melbourne Avenue		Fleetwood, Lancashire	Transferred from North Lancashire/Cumbria (10th)
Glossop	Hargate Hill Lane		Charlesworth, Glossop, Derbyshire	3rd
Hoylake	Carham Road		Hoylake, Merseyside	11th
Leigh	Round Ash Park		Leigh, Greater Manchester	7th
Liverpool Collegiate	Aigburth Cricket Ground	3,000	Aigburth, Liverpool, Merseyside	Promoted from South Lancs/Cheshire 2 (runners up)
Rochdale	Moorgate Avenue		Rochdale, Greater Manchester	Relegated from North 1 West (13th)
Sefton	Thornhead Lane		Liverpool, Merseyside	10th
Southport	Recreation Ground	3,500	Southport, Merseyside	9th
Tarleton	Carr Lane		Tarleton, Lancashire	Transferred from North Lancashire/Cumbria (7th)
Winnington Park	Burrows Hill	5,000	Hartford, Northwich, Cheshire	Promoted from South Lancs/Cheshire 2 (champions)

Locations of the 2018–19 Lancs/Cheshire 1 teams

== Teams 2017–18 ==
Team	Ground	Capacity	City/Area	Previous season
Anselmians	Malone Field		Eastham, Merseyside	11th
Bowdon	Clay Lane		Timperley, Altrincham, Greater Manchester	5th
Broughton Park	Hough End		Chorlton-cum-Hardy, Manchester	3rd
Glossop	Hargate Hill Lane		Charlesworth, Glossop, Derbyshire	4th
Hoylake	Carham Road		Hoylake, Merseyside	Promoted from South Lancs/Cheshire 2 (runners up)
Leigh	Round Ash Park		Leigh, Greater Manchester	Relegated from North 1 West (13th)
Liverpool St Helens	Moss Lane	4,370 (370 seats)	St. Helens, Lancashire	6th
New Brighton	Hartsfield	2,000	Moreton, Merseyside	10th
Sefton	Thornhead Lane		Liverpool, Merseyside	8th
Southport	Recreation Ground	3,500	Southport, Merseyside	9th
Tyldesley	St Georges Park		Tyldesley, Greater Manchester	Promoted from South Lancs/Cheshire 2 (champions)
West Park St Helens	Red Rocks		St. Helens, Lancashire	Relegated from North 1 West (12th)
Widnes	Heath Road		Widnes, Cheshire	7th

Locations of the 2017–18 South Lancs/Cheshire 1 teams in Merseyside & Cheshire
Locations of the 2017–18 South Lancs/Cheshire 1 teams in Greater Manchester & Derbyshire

== Participating clubs 2016–17 ==
- Anselmians
- Bowdon
- Broughton Park
- Douglas (I.O.M.)
- Glossop
- Liverpool St Helens
- Manchester
- Manchester Medics (promoted from Cheshire (South))
- New Brighton
- Oswestry (promoted from Cheshire (South))
- Sefton
- Southport (promoted from Merseyside (West))
- Widnes
- Wigan

== Participating clubs 2015–16 ==
Team	Ground	Capacity	City/Area	Previous season
Anselmians	Malone Field		Eastham, Merseyside	8th
Bowdon	Clay Lane		Timperley, Altrincham, Greater Manchester	11th
Douglas	Port-e-Chee Meadow		Douglas, Isle of Man	10th
Glossop	Hargate Hill Lane		Charlesworth, Glossop, Derbyshire	7th
Hoylake	Carham Road		Hoylake, Merseyside	12th
Liverpool Collegiate	Aigburth Cricket Ground	3,000	Liverpool, Merseyside	Promoted from South Lancs/Cheshire 2 (champions)
Liverpool St Helens	Moss Lane	4,370 (370 seats)	St. Helens, Lancashire	2nd
Manchester	Grove Park	4,000 (250 seats)	Cheadle Hulme, Stockport, Greater Manchester	9th
New Brighton	Hartsfield	2,000	Moreton, Merseyside	Relegated from North 1 West (13th)
Northwich	Moss Farm		Northwich, Cheshire	3rd
Sefton	Thornhead Lane		Liverpool, Merseyside	6th
West Park St Helens	Red Rocks		St. Helens, Lancashire	5th
Wigan	Douglas Valley		Wigan, Lancashire	Level transfer from North Lancashire/Cumbria (7th)
Winnington Park	Burrows Hill	5,000	Winnington, Northwich, Cheshire	4th

2015-16 Merseyside South Lancs/Cheshire 1 teams
Locations of the 2015-16 South Lancs/Cheshire 1 teams

== Participating clubs 2014–15 ==
- Altrincham Kersal (relegated from North 1 West)
- Anselmians
- Bowdon (promoted from South Lancs/Cheshire 2)
- Douglas (I.O.M.)
- Glossop
- Hoylake
- Liverpool St Helens (relegated from North 1 West)
- Manchester
- Manchester Medics (promoted from South Lancs/Cheshire 2)
- Northwich
- Ruskin Park
- Sefton
- West Park St Helens
- Winnington Park

== Participating clubs 2013–14 ==
- Anselmians
- Ashton-on-Mersey
- Douglas (I.O.M.) (promoted from South Lancs/Cheshire 2)
- Glossop
- Hoylake
- Manchester (relegated from North 1 West)
- New Brighton
- Northwich
- Ruskin Park
- Sefton (promoted from South Lancs/Cheshire 2)
- Tyldesley
- West Park St Helens
- Wigan
- Winnington Park

== Participating clubs 2012–13 ==
- Ashton-on-Mersey
- Bowdon
- Broughton Park (relegated from North 1 West)
- Crewe & Nantwich
- Glossop
- Hoylake
- New Brighton
- Orrell
- Ruskin Park
- Tyldesley
- Warrington
- West Park St Helens
- Wigan
- Winnington Park

== Original teams ==
When league rugby began in 1987 this division contained the following teams:

- Aspull
- Birchfield
- Douglas
- Eagle
- Liverpool College
- Mersey Police
- Old Anselmians (Note: Now known as Anselmians.)
- Old Parkonians
- Oldershaw
- Ormskirk
- St. Edward's Old Boys

== Lancs/Cheshire 1 honours ==
=== North-West West 1 (1987–1992) ===
The original incarnation of Lancs/Cheshire 1 was known as North-West West 1, and was a tier 9 league with promotion up to North West 2 and relegation down to North-West West 2.

North-West West 1
Season	No of Teams	Champions	Runners–up	Relegated Teams
1987–88	11	Mersey Police	Liverpool College	Old Anselmians, Oldershaw
1988–89	11	Warrington	Old Parkonians	Birchfield, Aspull
1989–90	11	St. Edward's Old Boys	Oldershaw	Old Parkonians
1990–91	11	South Liverpool	Ruskin Park	Vulcan
1991–92	11	Ormskirk	Oldershaw (Note: 3rd place Vagabonds were also promoted.)	No relegation (Note: The restructure of the North-West leagues for the following season with North-West West 3 being discontinued and North-West West 2 splitting into two regional leagues - Cheshire and Lancashire South - meant that there was no relegation, although bottom side Old Intonians would merge with Old Rockferrians to form Prenton RUFC and would enter the Cheshire league for the 1992–93 season.)
Green backgrounds are promotion places.

=== Cheshire/Lancs South (1992–1996) ===
Restructuring of north-west leagues saw North-West West 1 renamed as Cheshire/Lancs South for the 1993–94 season. Promotion continued to be up to North West 2, while relegation was to either Cheshire or Lancashire South (new regional divisions of what was North-West West 2). The division was initially at tier 9 but the creation of National 5 North for the 1993–94 season meant that Cheshire/Lancs South dropped to become a tier 10 league.

Cheshire/Lancs South
Season	No of Teams	Champions	Runners–up	Relegated Teams
1992–93	12	Ruskin Park	Kersal	Douglas
1993–94	13	Leigh	Aspull	Newton-le-Willows, St Mark's Old Boy, Liverpool College
1994–95	13	Aspull	Eagle	Vulcan, Old Anselmians, Southport
1995–96	13	Ruskin Park	Newton-le-Willows	Port Sunlight, Sefton, Congelton, Crewe & Nantwich (Note: Reorganisation of the Lancashire and Cheshire leagues for the 1996–97 season meant that four teams instead of three were relegated into the new look South/Lancs Cheshire 2 - now back to being a single division.)
Green backgrounds are promotion places.

=== South Lancs/Cheshire 1 (1996–2000) ===
The league system was restructured from top to bottom by the Rugby Football Union for the start of the 1996–97 season. Firstly, as part of the reorganisation of the Cheshire and Lancashire leagues, Cheshire/Lancs South was renamed South Lancs/Cheshire 1. The cancellation of National 5 North and creation of North West 3 meant that South/Lancs Cheshire 1 remained a tier 10 league, with promotion to North West 3 and relegation to the newly named South/Lancs Cheshire 2 - now back to being a single division. From the 1998–99 season onward the league was known as EuroManx South Lancs/Cheshire 1 after its sponsor EuroManx.

South/Lancs Cheshire 1
Season	No of Teams	Champions	Runners–up	Relegated Teams
1996–97	10	Altrincham Kersal	Wirral	Old Parkonians, Birchfield
1997–98	9	Warrington	Southport	Newton-le-Willows, South Liverpool
1998–99	10	St. Edward's Old Boys	Wallasey	Anselmians, Ruskin Park
1999–00	9	Birchfield	Dukinfield	Old Salians, Eagle, Crewe & Nantwich
Green backgrounds are promotion places.

=== South Lancs/Cheshire 1 (2000–2018) ===
Northern league restructuring by the RFU at the end of the 1999–2000 season saw the cancellation of North West 1, North West 2 and North West 3 (tiers 7-9). This meant that South/Lancs Cheshire 1 became a tier 7 league, with promotion to North 2 West (currently North 1 West). The division would continue to be known as EuroManx South Lancs/Cheshire 1 until the 2007–08 season when EuroManx ceased operations. Relegation during this time continued to be to South Lancs/Cheshire 2 except for one season (2015–16) where teams dropped to Cheshire (South), Lancashire (North) or Merseyside (West).

South Lancs/Cheshire 1
Season	No of Teams	Champions	Runners–up	Relegated Teams
2000–01	12	Birkenhead Park	Warrington	Ashton-on-Mersey
2001–02	12	Wilmslow	Aspull	St Edward's Old Boys, Dukinfield
2002–03	12	Caldy	Widnes	Ormskirk, Oldershaw
2003–04	12	Widnes	Bowdon	Birchfield, Anselmians
2004–05	12	Rochdale	Leigh	Southport, Wigan
2005–06	12	Broughton Park	Wilmslow	Warrington
2006–07	12	Northwich	Leigh	Oldershaw, Dukinfield
2007–08	12	Wilmslow	Burnage	Ruskin Park, Anselmians, Aspull
2008–09	11	Burnage	Widnes	No relegation (Note: No relegation as division due to increase from 11 to 14 teams for the following season.)
2009–10	14	Wirral	Widnes	Dukinfield, Warrington
2010–11	14	Anselmians	Widnes	Oswestry, Vagabonds
2011–12	14	Sale FC	New Brighton	Ormskirk, Liverpool Collegiate
2012–13	14	Warrington	Broughton Park	Orrell, Bowdon
2013–14	14	New Brighton	Northwich	Ashton-on-Mersey, Tyldesley
2014–15	14	Altrincham Kersal	Liverpool St Helens	Ruskin Park, Manchester Medics
2015–16	14	Northwich	West Park St Helens	Winnington Park, Hoylake
2016–17	14	Manchester	Douglas	Oswestry, Wigan
2017–18	14	Broughton Park	Anselmians	New Brighton (Note: Only one team relegated from division as Manchester Medics dropped out of the league.)
Green backgrounds are promotion places.

=== Lancs/Cheshire 1 (2018-present) ===
South Lancs/Cheshire 1 was renamed as Lancs/Cheshire 1 for the 2018–19 season continuing as a tier 7 league with promotion to North 1 West. The creation of North 2 West for the 2019–20 season meant that Lancs/Cheshire 1 dropped to being a tier 8 league with promotion into this new division. Relegation continued to Lancs/Cheshire 2 (formerly South Lancs/Cheshire 2).

Lancs/Cheshire 1
Season	No of Teams	Champions	Runners–up	Relegated Teams
2018–19	13	Altrincham Kersal	Bowdon	Fleetwood, Hoylake
2019–20	8 (Note: 3 teams from the newly restructured Lancs/Cheshire Division 1 dropped out of the RFU leagues to join the ADM Lancashire Leagues.)	Orrell	Hoylake	Ramsey, Birchfield
2020–21	8			
Green backgrounds are promotion places.

== Promotion play-offs ==
For the 2018–19 season there was play-off between the runners-up of Lancashire/Cheshire 1 and Cumbria 1 and for the third and final promotion place to North 1 West. Previously Lancs/Cheshire sides had faced teams from North Lancashire/Cumbria (see following subsection). As of 2019–20 Lancashire/Cheshire 1 sides have one win to Cumbria's zero; and the home side has one win to the away side's zero. The introduction of North 2 West for the 2019–20 and the subsequent demotion of both Lancashire/Cheshire 1 and Cumbria 1 to tier 8 divisions, means that if the playoff continues it will be in place in the newly introduced division.

Cumbria 1 v Lancs/Cheshire 1 promotion play-off results
Season	Home team	Score	Away team	Venue	Attendance
2018–19	Bowdon (NW)	HWO (Note: Bowdon won the 2018–19 promotion playoff by default as Aspatria were unwilling to take part.)	Aspatria (C)	Clay Lane, Timperley, Altrincham, Greater Manchester	N/A
Green background is the promoted team. C = Cumbria 1 and NW = North 2 West

=== Discontinued promotion play-offs ===
Between the 2000–01 and 2017–18 seasons there was a play-off between the runners-up of North Lancashire/Cumbria and South Lancs/Cheshire 1 for the third and final promotion place to North 1 West. The team with the superior league record had home advantage in the tie. This continued until the North Lancashire/Cumbria division was abolished due to RFU restructuring of the leagues. At the end of the 2017–18 season the North Lancashire/Cumbria and South Lancs/Cheshire 1 team sides had nine wins apiece; and the home team had won promotion on thirteen occasions compared to the away teams five.

North Lancashire/Cumbria v South Lancs/Cheshire 1 promotion play-off results
Season	Home team	Score	Away team	Venue	Attendance
2000–01	Warrington (SLC)	HWO (Note: Warrington won 2000-01 promotion playoff by default as Carlisle were unable to raise a team.)	Carlisle (NLC)	The Fortress, Walton, Cheshire	N/A
2001–02	Oldham (NLC)	15-24	Aspull (SLC)	Manor Park, Oldham, Greater Manchester	
2002–03	Penrith (NLC)	25-10	Widnes (SLC)	Winters Park, Penrith, Cumbria	
2003–04	Rossendale (NLC)	24-28	Bowdon (SLC)	Marl Pits, Rawtenstall, Rossendale, Lancashire	
2004–05	Leigh (SLC)	13-15	Tyldesley (NLC)	Round Ash Park, Leigh, Greater Manchester	
2005–06	Wilmslow (SLC)	43-10	St Benedicts (NLC)	Memorial Ground, Wilmslow, Cheshire	
2006–07	Leigh (SLC)	40-15	Blackburn (NLC)	Round Ash Park, Leigh, Greater Manchester	
2007–08	Rossendale (NLC)	20-16	Burnage (SLC)	Marl Pits, Rawtenstall, Rossendale, Lancashire	
2008–09	Widnes (SLC)	41-52	Vale of Lune (NLC)	Heath Road, Widnes, Cheshire	
2009–10	Kirkby Lonsdale (NLC)	13-12	Widnes (SLC)	Underley Park, Kirkby Lonsdale, Cumbria	
2010–11	Widnes (SLC)	26-19	Fleetwood (NLC)	Heath Road, Widnes, Cheshire	
2011–12	Kirkby Lonsdale (NLC)	21-18 (aet)	New Brighton (SLC)	Underley Park, Kirkby Lonsdale, Cumbria	
2012–13	Broughton Park (SLC)	32-13	Eccles (NLC)	Hough End, Chorlton-cum-Hardy, Manchester	
2013–14	Bolton (NLC)	21-18	Northwich (SLC)	Avenue Street, Bolton, Greater Manchester	500
2014–15	Leigh (NLC)	34-26	Liverpool St Helens (SLC)	Leigh, Greater Manchester	
2015–16	Bolton (NLC)	20-27	West Park St Helens (SLC)	Avenue Street, Bolton, Greater Manchester	
2016–17	Douglas (I.O.M.) (SLC)	15-14	De La Salle (Salford) (NLC)	Port-E-Chee, Douglas, Isle of Man	600
2017–18	Anselmians (SLC)	65-14	Aspatria (NLC)	Malone Field, Eastham	
Green background is the promoted team. NLC = North Lancashire/Cumbria and SLC = South Lancs/Cheshire 1

== Number of league titles ==
- Altrincham Kersal (3)
- Warrington (3)
- Broughton Park (2)
- Northwich (2)
- Ruskin Park (2)
- St. Edward's Old Boys (2)
- Wilmslow (2)
- Anselmians (1)
- Aspull (1)
- Birchfield (1)
- Birkenhead Park (1)
- Burnage (1)
- Caldy (1)
- Leigh (1)
- Manchester (1)
- Mersey Police (1)
- New Brighton (1)
- Ormskirk (1)
- Orrell (1)
- Rochdale (1)
- Sale FC (1)
- South Liverpool (1)
- Widnes (1)
- Wirral (1)

== See also ==
- Cheshire RFU
- Lancashire RFU
- English rugby union system
- Rugby union in England
