= Joseph Mills =

Joseph or Joe Mills may refer to:

- Joseph Trotter Mills, American attorney, jurist, and politician
- Joe Mills (rugby union), English rugby union player of late 1800s
- Joseph E. Mills, American architect
- Joe Mills (footballer, fl. 1903-1908), see List of Bury F.C. players (1–24 appearances)
- Joe Mills (footballer) (1895–1979), English footballer
- Joseph Mills (footballer) (born 1989), English footballer
