= Regional 2 North West =

Level six rugby union league in England

- Current season or competition: 2025–26 Regional 2 North West
- Sport: Rugby union
- Instituted: 2022
- Number of teams: 12
- Country: England
- Holders: North Ribblesdale (2025–26)
- Most titles: Anselmians, Birkenhead Park, Bowdon and North Ribblesdale (1 title)
- Website: Northern Division

Regional 2 North West is a level six league in the English rugby union system, with the twelve teams drawn for the most part from Lancashire, Greater Manchester, Cheshire, Merseyside and the Isle of Man with selected others from neighbouring counties. The other level six leagues in the Northern Division are Regional 2 North for teams in North East England and Cumbria; and Regional 2 North East for teams, predominantly, in Yorkshire. It was created as a product of the 2022 Adult Competition Review.

North Ribblesdale are the current champions and are promoted to Regional 1 North West.

== Structure ==
The league consists of twelve teams who play the others on a home and away basis, to make a total of 22 matches each. The champions are promoted to Regional 1 North West and the bottom sides are relegated to Counties 1 ADM Lancashire & Cheshire.

The results of the matches contribute points to the league as follows:

- 4 points are awarded for a win
- 2 points are awarded for a draw
- 0 points are awarded for a loss, however
- 1 losing (bonus) point is awarded to a team that loses a match by 7 points or fewer
- 1 additional (bonus) point is awarded to a team scoring 4 tries or more in a match.

== 2026–27 ==
=== Participating teams and locations ===
Departing were the champions North Ribblesdale, promoted to Regional 1 North East, together with Vale of Lune (2nd place and play-off winner) promoted to Regional 1 North West while West Park St Helens (11th and relegation play-off loser) and Altrincham Kersal (12th) were relegated to Counties 1 ADM Lancashire & Cheshire.

Team	Ground	Capacity	City/Area	Previous season
Birkenhead Park	Upper Park	2,000	Birkenhead, Wirral	8th
Burnage	Varley Park		Stockport, Greater Manchester	6th
Douglas	Port-E-Chee		Douglas, Isle of Man	5th
Firwood Waterloo	St Anthony's Road	9,950 (950 seats)	Blundellsands, Merseyside	9th
Kirkby Lonsdale	Underley Park		Kirkby Lonsdale, Cumbria	Promoted from Counties 1 Cumbria (champions)
Manchester	Grove Park	4,000 (250 seats)	Cheadle Hulme, Stockport, Greater Manchester	Relegated from Regional 1NW (12th)
Northwich	Moss Farm		Northwich, Cheshire	10th
Sandbach	Bradwall Road		Sandbach, Cheshire	3rd
Warrington	Grappenhall Village Sports Club		Walton, Warrington, Cheshire	Promoted from Counties 1 ADM Lancashire & Cheshire (runners-up)
Widnes	Heath Road		Widnes, Cheshire	7th
Wilmslow	Memorial Ground		Wilmslow, Cheshire	Promoted from Counties 1 ADM Lancashire & Cheshire (champions)
Winnington Park	Burrows Hill	5,000	Hartford, Northwich, Cheshire	10th

Locations of the 2026–27 Regional 2 North West teams in NW England

== 2025–26 ==
=== Participating teams and locations ===
Departing were Bowdon, promoted to Regional 1 North West, while Crewe & Nantwich (11th) and Eccles (12th) were relegated to Counties 1 Midlands West (North) and Counties 1 ADM Lancashire & Cheshire respectively. Incoming clubs were Birkenhead Park (12th), relegated from Regional 1 North West, while North Ribblesdale and West Park St Helens, champions of Counties 1 Yorkshire and Counties 1 ADM Lancashire & Cheshire respectively were both promoted.

Team	Ground	Capacity	City/Area	Previous season
Altrincham Kersal	Stelfox Avenue		Timperley, Altrincham, Greater Manchester	7th
Birkenhead Park	Upper Park	2,000	Birkenhead, Wirral	Relegated from Regional 1NW (12th)
Burnage	Varley Park		Stockport, Greater Manchester	5th
Douglas	Port-E-Chee		Douglas, Isle of Man	6th
Firwood Waterloo	St Anthony's Road	9,950 (950 seats)	Blundellsands, Merseyside	2nd
North Ribblesdale	Grove Park		Settle, North Yorkshire	Promoted from Counties 1 Yorkshire (champions)
Northwich	Moss Farm		Northwich, Cheshire	8th
Sandbach	Bradwall Road		Sandbach, Cheshire	3rd
Vale of Lune	Powder House Lane	4,000 (50 seats)	Lancaster, Lancashire	4th
West Park St Helens	Red Rocks		St. Helens, Lancashire	Promoted from Counties 1 ADM Lancashire & Cheshire (champions)
Widnes	Heath Road		Widnes, Cheshire	9th
Winnington Park	Burrows Hill	5,000	Hartford, Northwich, Cheshire	10th

Locations of the 2025–26 Regional 2 North West teams in NW England

=== League table ===
Regional 2 North West 2025–26
Pos	Team	Played	Won	Drawn	Lost	Points for	Points against	Points diff	Try bonus	Loss bonus	Points
1	North Ribblesdale (P)	22	18	0	4	779	368	411	17	3	92
2	Vale of Lune (P)	22	16	0	6	668	432	236	15	2	81
3	Sandbach	22	16	0	6	747	432	315	12	3	79
4	Widnes	22	13	0	9	581	603	−22	9	3	64
5	Douglas	22	11	0	11	578	497	81	12	6	62
6	Burnage	22	11	0	11	595	606	−11	11	5	60
7	Winnington Park	22	11	0	11	513	615	−102	7	2	53
8	Birkenhead Park	22	9	0	13	559	605	−46	11	5	52
9	Firwood Waterloo	22	8	0	14	535	651	−116	11	8	51
10	Northwich	22	9	0	13	568	604	−36	10	3	49
11	West Park St Helens (R)	22	8	0	14	457	757	−300	7	2	41
12	Altrincham Kersal (R)	22	2	0	20	432	842	−410	8	8	24
If teams are level at any stage, tiebreakers are applied in the following order: 1. Number of matches won 2. Number of draws 3. Difference between points for and against 4. Total number of points for 5. Aggregate number of points scored in matches between tied teams 6. Number of matches won excluding the first match, then the second and so on until the tie is settled
Mint background is the promotion place (1st); Green background are the promotion play-off places (2nd–5th); Pink background are the relegation play-off places (10th–11th); Salmon background is the relegation place (12th); Updated: 25 May 2026

=== Play-offs ===
The champions, North Ribblesdale, are automatically promoted to next seasons Regional 1 North East. The teams in second place through to fifth place take part in the first round of the promotion play-offs, with the winner of each match taking part in round 2. Vale of Lune won round 2 and played the winner of the Regional 2 North Midlands play-offs, with the winner of this match, playing in the Regional 1 North West Accession Final.

Round 1

18 April 2026

Vale of Lune (2nd)	23 – 18	Douglas (5th)

Powder House Lane, Lancaster

18 April 2026

Sandbach (3rd)	27 – 19	Widnes (4th)

Bradwall Road, Sandbach

Round 2

25 April 2026

Vale of Lune (2nd)	29 – 17	Sandbach (3rd)

Powder House Lane, Lancaster

Round 3

2 May 2026

West Bridford	51 – 55	Vale of Lune

The Memorial Ground, West Bridgford

Regional 1 North West Accession Final

9 May 2026

Manchester	13 – 16	Vale of Lune

Grove Park, Cheadle Hulme

- Vale of Lune are promoted.

Relegation play-off

The 10th and 11h placed teams held a play-off, with the losing team relegated.

25 April 2026

Northwich (10th)	32 – 25	West Park St Helens (11th)

Moss Farm, Northwich

- West Park St Helens are relegated.

== 2024–25 ==
=== Participating teams and locations ===
Departing were Birkenhead Park, who were promoted to Regional 1 North West, and Liverpool St Helens, who were relegated to Counties 1 ADM Lancashire & Cheshire. Kirkby Lonsdale (11th) went on a level transfer to Regional 2 North as did Whitchurch on a level transfer back to Regional 2 West Midlands after just one season. Joining were Sandbach and Northwich, relegated from Regional 1 North West, whilst Eccles and Widnes were promoted from Counties 1 ADM Lancashire & Cheshire.

Team	Ground	Capacity	City/Area	Previous season
Altrincham Kersal	Stelfox Avenue		Timperley, Altrincham, Greater Manchester	8th
Bowdon	Clay Lane		Timperley, Altrincham, Greater Manchester	3rd
Burnage	Varley Park		Stockport, Greater Manchester	5th
Crewe & Nantwich	Newcastle Road		Nantwich, Cheshire	4th
Douglas	Port-E-Chee		Douglas, Isle of Man	10th
Eccles	Gorton Street		Eccles, Greater Manchester	Promoted from Counties 1 ADM Lancashire & Cheshire (runners-up)
Firwood Waterloo	St Anthony's Road	9,950 (950 seats)	Blundellsands, Merseyside	2nd
Northwich	Moss Farm		Northwich, Cheshire	Relegated from Regional 1 North West (12th)
Sandbach	Bradwall Road		Sandbach, Cheshire	Relegated from Regional 1 North West (11th)
Vale of Lune	Powder House Lane	4,000 (50 seats)	Lancaster, Lancashire	7th
Widnes	Heath Road		Widnes, Cheshire	Promoted from Counties 1 ADM Lancashire & Cheshire (champions)
Winnington Park	Burrows Hill	5,000	Hartford, Northwich, Cheshire	8th

Locations of the 2024–25 Regional 2 North West teams in NW England
Locations of the 2024–25 Regional 2 North West teams in Greater Manchester

=== League table ===
Regional 2 North West 2024–25
	Team	Played	Won	Drawn	Lost	Points for	Points against	Points diff	Try bonus	Loss bonus	Points	Points deducted
1	Bowdon (P)	22	19	0	3	813	375	438	15	2	94	0
2	Firwood Waterloo	22	18	0	4	750	485	265	16	2	90	0
3	Sandbach	22	17	0	5	884	395	489	17	2	87	0
4	Vale of Lune	22	15	1	6	601	529	72	13	2	77	0
5	Burnage	22	12	1	9	672	582	90	12	3	65	0
6	Douglas	22	11	0	11	560	521	39	11	2	57	0
7	Altrincham Kersal	22	10	0	12	478	665	−187	10	3	53	0
8	Northwich	22	8	0	14	486	500	−14	6	6	44	0
9	Widnes	22	8	0	14	394	628	−234	7	2	41	0
10	Winnington Park	22	5	0	17	479	780	−301	9	5	34	0
11	Crewe & Nantwich (R)	22	6	0	16	337	678	−341	4	2	30	0
12	Eccles (R)	22	2	0	20	454	770	−316	10	5	18	−5
If teams are level at any stage, tiebreakers are applied in the following order: 1. Number of matches won 2. Number of draws 3. Difference between points for and against 4. Total number of points for 5. Aggregate number of points scored in matches between tied teams 6. Number of matches won excluding the first match, then the second and so on until the tie is settled
Green background is the promotion place. Pink background are the relegation places. Updated: 24 September 2025; Source:

== 2023–24 ==
=== Participating teams and locations ===
Departing were Anselmians, who were promoted to Regional 1 North West while Broughton Park and Wilmslow were relegated to Counties 1 ADM Lancashire & Cheshire. Glossop (9th) and Rochdale (4th) went on a level transfer to Regional 2 North East.

Joining were Burnage and Kirby Lonsdale, relegated from Regional 1 North West, and Liverpool St Helens promoted from Counties 1 ADM Lancashire & Cheshire. Also coming in were Crewe & Nantwich and Whitchurch, both on a level transfer from Regional 2 West Midlands.

Team	Ground	Capacity	City/Area	Previous season
Altrincham Kersal	Stelfox Avenue		Timperley, Altrincham, Greater Manchester	6th
Birkenhead Park	Upper Park	2,000	Birkenhead, Wirral	3rd
Bowdon	Clay Lane		Timperley, Altrincham, Greater Manchester	2nd
Burnage	Varley Park		Stockport, Greater Manchester	Relegated from Regional 1 North West (11th)
Crewe & Nantwich	Newcastle Road		Nantwich, Cheshire	Level transfer from Regional 2 West Midlands (8th)
Douglas	Port-E-Chee		Douglas, Isle of Man	10th
Firwood Waterloo	St Anthony's Road	9,950 (950 seats)	Blundellsands, Merseyside	5th
Kirkby Lonsdale	Underley Park		Kirkby Lonsdale, Cumbria	Relegated from Regional 1 North West (12th)
Liverpool St Helens	Moss Lane	4,370 (370 seats)	St. Helens, Lancashire	Promoted from Counties 1 ADM Lancashire & Cheshire (champions)
Vale of Lune	Powder House Lane	4,000 (50 seats)	Lancaster, Lancashire	7th
Whitchurch	Edgeley Park		Whitchurch, Shropshire	Level transfer from Regional 2 West Midlands (9th)
Winnington Park	Burrows Hill	5,000	Hartford, Northwich, Cheshire	8th

Locations of the 2023–24 Regional 2 North West teams in NW England
Locations of the 2023–24 Regional 2 North West teams in Greater Manchester

=== League table ===
Regional 2 North West 2023–24
	Team	Played	Won	Drawn	Lost	Points for	Points against	Points diff	Try bonus	Loss bonus	Points	Points deducted
1	Birkenhead Park (P)	22	19	1	2	778	405	373	20	1	97	0
2	Firwood Waterloo	22	16	1	5	661	404	257	13	3	80	0
3	Bowdon	22	15	1	6	555	442	113	12	4	76	0
4	Crewe & Nantwich	22	14	1	7	549	390	159	9	3	70	0
5	Burnage	22	10	0	12	623	549	74	13	8	61	0
6	Whitchurch	22	10	0	12	425	481	−56	8	6	54	0
7	Vale of Lune	22	8	2	12	519	544	−136	7	4	47	0
8	Altrincham Kersal	22	8	1	13	456	592	−136	6	4	44	0
9	Winnington Park	22	7	1	14	582	721	−139	10	3	43	0
10	Douglas	22	8	2	12	377	428	−51	4	5	41	0
11	Kirkby Lonsdale	22	7	1	14	420	627	−207	6	5	41	0
12	Liverpool St Helens (R)	22	4	1	17	371	733	−362	5	5	26	−2
If teams are level at any stage, tiebreakers are applied in the following order: 1. Number of matches won 2. Number of draws 3. Difference between points for and against 4. Total number of points for 5. Aggregate number of points scored in matches between tied teams 6. Number of matches won excluding the first match, then the second and so on until the tie is settled
Green background is the promotion place. Pink background are the relegation places. Updated: 7 November 2024; Source:

== 2022–23 ==
=== Participating teams and locations ===
This was the first season following the Rugby Football Union (RFU) Adult Competition Review. The league was substantially similar to North 1 West (although smaller as the 14 teams were reduced to 12) with nine teams returning supplemented by three from North 2 West – Anselmians, Rochdale and Winnington Park.

Team	Ground	Capacity	City/Area	Previous season
Altrincham Kersal	Stelfox Avenue		Timperley, Altrincham, Greater Manchester	10th North 1 West
Anselmians	Malone Field		Eastham, Merseyside	1st North 2 West
Birkenhead Park	Upper Park	2,000	Birkenhead, Wirral	5th North 1 West
Bowdon	Clay Lane		Timperley, Altrincham, Greater Manchester	12th North 1 West
Broughton Park	Hough End		Chorlton-cum-Hardy, Manchester	8th North 1 West
Douglas	Port-E-Chee		Douglas, Isle of Man	13th North 1 West
Firwood Waterloo	St Anthony's Road	9,950 (950 seats)	Blundellsands, Merseyside	4th North 1 West
Glossop	Hargate Hill Lane		Charlesworth, Glossop, Derbyshire	7th North 1 West
Rochdale	Moorgate Avenue		Rochdale, Greater Manchester	2nd North 2 West
Vale of Lune	Powder House Lane	4,000 (50 seats)	Lancaster, Lancashire	9th North 1 West
Wilmslow	Memorial Ground		Wilmslow, Cheshire	11th North 1 West
Winnington Park	Burrows Hill	5,000	Hartford, Northwich, Cheshire	4th North 2 West

Locations of the 2022–23 Regional 2 North West teams in NW England
Locations of the 2022–23 Regional 2 North West teams in Greater Manchester

=== League table ===
Regional 2 North West 2022–23
	Team	Played	Won	Drawn	Lost	Points for	Points against	Points diff	Try bonus	Loss bonus	Points	Points deducted
1	Anselmians (P)	22	20	0	2	743	290	453	16	2	99	0
2	Bowdon	22	19	0	3	772	472	300	18	0	94	0
3	Birkenhead Park	22	16	0	6	785	409	376	15	4	83	0
4	Rochdale	22	15	0	7	592	401	191	13	3	76	0
5	Firwood Waterloo	22	13	0	9	673	554	119	12	3	67	0
6	Altrincham Kersal	22	10	0	12	483	490	−7	10	4	54	0
7	Vale of Lune	22	9	0	13	452	595	−143	8	1	45	0
8	Winnington Park	22	8	0	14	530	702	−172	7	5	44	0
9	Glossop	22	8	0	14	489	675	−186	7	5	44	0
10	Douglas	22	6	0	16	429	636	−207	5	4	33	0
11	Broughton Park (R)	22	3	1	18	374	829	−455	4	2	20	0
12	Wilmslow (R)	22	4	1	17	340	609	−269	3	2	18	−5
If teams are level at any stage, tiebreakers are applied in the following order: 1. Number of matches won 2. Number of draws 3. Difference between points for and against 4. Total number of points for 5. Aggregate number of points scored in matches between tied teams 6. Number of matches won excluding the first match, then the second and so on until the tie is settled
Green background is the promotion place. Pink background are the relegation places. Updated: 6 November 2024; Source:

== Regional 2 North West (2022– ) ==
League restructuring by the RFU created twelve leagues at level six. The champions are promoted to Regional 1 North West and the bottom sides are relegated to Counties 1 ADM Lancashire & Cheshire

Regional 2 North West
Season	No of teams	No of matches	Champions	Runners-up	Relegated team(s)	Ref
2022–23	12	22	Anselmians	Bowdon	Broughton Park (11th) and Wilmslow (12th)	
2023–24	12	22	Birkenhead Park	Northern	Liverpool St Helens (12th)	
2024–25	12	22	Bowdon	Firwood Waterloo	Crewe & Nantwich (11th) and Eccles (12th)	
2025–26	12	22	North Ribblesdale	Vale of Lune	West Park St Helens (11th) and Altrincham Kersal (12th)	
Green background is the promotion place.
