= North 2 West =

Regional English rugby union league

- Current season or competition: 2019–20 North 2 West
- Sport: Rugby union
- Instituted: 2019; 7 years ago
- Number of teams: 14
- Country: England
- Holders: Manchester (1st title) (2019–20) (promoted to North 1 West)
- Most titles: Manchester (1 title)
- Website: England RFU

North 2 West is a regional English rugby union league at the seventh tier of club rugby union for teams from Cheshire, Cumbria, Merseyside, Lancashire and Greater Manchester. The division was introduced for the 2019-20 season to form a new league at tier 7 - meaning that Lancs/Cheshire 1 would drop to being a tier 8 league.

Promoted teams enter North 1 West while relegated teams typically drop down to Lancs/Cheshire 1 or Cumbria. Each season teams from North 2 West are picked to take part in the RFU Intermediate Cup (a national competition for clubs at level 7).

== Teams 2021–22 ==
The teams competing in 2021-22 achieved their places in the league based on performances in 2019-20, the 'previous season' column in the table below refers to that season not 2020-21.

Outgoing teams were Manchester and Glossop who were promoted to North 2 West whilst Eccles (11th) and Sefton (12th) would have been relegated to Lancs/Cheshire 1 but instead withdrew from the RFU leagues to join the Lancashire ADM competition, as did Aspull who finished in 8th position. Also departed are Aspatria who were level transferred to Durham/Northumberland 1 meaning the league has been reduced from 14 to 13.

Team	Ground	Capacity	City/Area	Previous season
Anselmians	Malone Field		Eastham, Merseyside	5th
Bolton	Avenue Street		Bolton, Greater Manchester	12th
Cockermouth	Grassmoor Sports Centre		Cockermouth, Cumbria	Promoted from Cumbria 1 (runners-up)
De La Salle	De La Salle Sports & Social Club		Salford, Greater Manchester	10th
Keswick	Davidson Park		Keswick, Cumbria	Relegated from North 1 West (14th)
Leigh	Round Ash Park		Leigh, Greater Manchester	4th
Orrell	St John Rigby College		Orrell, Greater Manchester	Promoted from Lancs/Cheshire 1 (champions)
Rochdale	Moorgate Avenue		Rochdale, Greater Manchester	3rd
Southport	Recreation Ground	3,500	Southport, Merseyside	7th
St. Benedict's	Newlands Avenue		Mirehouse, Whitehaven, Cumbria	Promoted from Cumbria 1 (champions)
Tarleton	Carr Lane		Tarleton, Lancashire	9th
Warrington	The Fortress		Walton, Warrington, Cheshire	Relegated from North 1 West (13th)
Winnington Park	Burrows Hill	5,000	Hartford, Northwich, Cheshire	11th

Locations of the 2021–22 North 2 West teams

== Season 2020–21 ==
On 30 October 2020 the RFU announced that due to the coronavirus pandemic a decision had been taken to cancel Adult Competitive Leagues (National League 1 and below) for the 2020/21 season meaning North 2 West was not contested.

== Teams 2019–20 ==
Team	Ground	Capacity	City/Area	Previous season
Anselmians	Malone Field		Eastham, Merseyside	Relegated from North 1 West (13th)
Aspatria	Bower Park	3,000 (300 seats)	Aspatria, Cumbria	Runners up (Cumbria 1 - lost playoff) (level transfer) (Note: Aspatria were transferred into North 2 West from Cumbria 1 to replace Liverpool Collegiate who joined the ADM Lancashire leagues.)
Aspull	Wood Lane		Aspull, Greater Manchester	Promoted from Lancs/Cheshire 2 (champions)
Bolton	Avenue Street		Bolton, Greater Manchester	4th
De La Salle	De La Salle Sports & Social Club		Salford, Greater Manchester	Relegated from North 1 West (14th)
Eccles	Gorton Street		Eccles, Greater Manchester	Promoted from Lancs/Cheshire 2 (runners)
Glossop	Hargate Hill Lane		Charlesworth, Glossop, Derbyshire	3rd
Leigh	Round Ash Park		Leigh, Greater Manchester	7th
Manchester	Grove Park	4,000 (250 seats)	Cheadle Hulme, Stockport, Greater Manchester	Relegated from North 1 West (12th)
Rochdale	Moorgate Avenue		Rochdale, Greater Manchester	5th
Sefton	Thornhead Lane		Liverpool, Merseyside	10th
Southport	Recreation Ground	3,500	Southport, Merseyside	8th
Tarleton	Carr Lane		Tarleton, Lancashire	9th
Winnington Park	Burrows Hill	5,000	Hartford, Northwich, Cheshire	6th

Locations of the 2019–20 North 2 West teams

== North 2 West honours ==
North 2 West
Season	No of Teams	Champions	Runners–up	Relegated Teams
2019–20	14	Manchester	Glossop	Sefton, Eccles
2020–21	14			
Green backgrounds are promotion places.

== Number of league titles ==
- Manchester (1)

== See also ==
- Cheshire RFU
- Lancashire RFU
- English rugby union system
- Rugby union in England
