= Harry Scott (rugby union) =

England international rugby union player

- Born: 7 November 1926 Batley, Yorkshire, England
- Died: 21 January 2012 (aged 85)

Rugby union career
- Position: Fullback
International career
| Years | Team | Apps | (Points) |
| 1955 | England | 1 | (0) |

Harry Scott (7 November 1926 – 21 January 2012) was an English international rugby union player.

Scott was born in Batley, Yorkshire. His father, Bobby Scott, played rugby league for Swinton and Cumberland.

A diminutive fullback, Scott began his rugby career at Eccles before moving to Manchester and was a Lancashire County representative player. He was capped once for England in 1955 when Nigel Gibbs was sidelined with an eye injury, slotting in at fullback for their Five Nations match against France at Twickenham, which they lost 9–16.

Scott was an engineering draughtsman by profession.

== See also ==
- List of England national rugby union players
