= William Openshaw =

English cricketer and rugby union player

- Born: William Edward Openshaw; 5 February 1852 Cape Town, Cape Colony
- Died: 7 February 1915 (aged 63) Warrington, England

Rugby union career
- Position: Halfback
Senior career
Years	Team	Apps	(Points)
- Manchester Football Club
–	Lancashire		
International career
Years	Team	Apps	(Points)
1879	England	1	(0)

William Edward Openshaw (5 February 1852 – 7 February 1915) was a rugby union international who represented England from 1879 to 1879.

== Life ==
The son of W. Openshaw of Victoria Park, Manchester, he was educated at Harrow School. There he played in the Cricket XI in 1869, leaving in 1870. He became a merchant in Manchester.

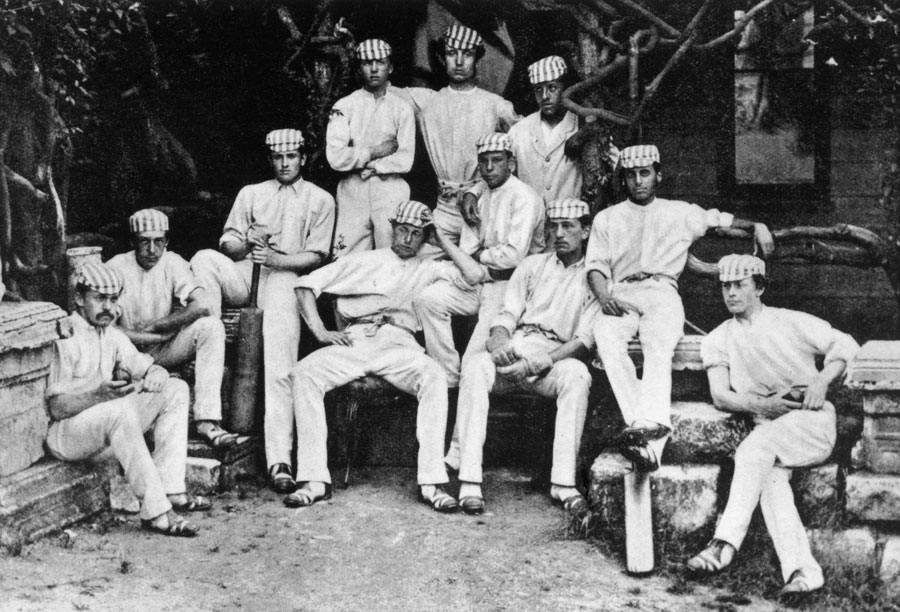
Harrow Cricket XI 1869 for the match against Eton, Openshaw fourth from the right of those seated

== Rugby union career ==
Openshaw played his club rugby for Manchester (then known as Manchester Football Club). Openshaw made his international debut on 24 March 1879 at The Oval in the England vs Ireland match in which he was on the winning side. He was described by contemporaries as a wonderful dribbler and took part in the second ever "Roses" match between Lancashire and Yorkshire.

== Cricketing career ==
Openshaw played four first-class cricket matches for Lancashire from 1879 to 1882.
