= Dan Kelly (rugby union) =

England international rugby union player

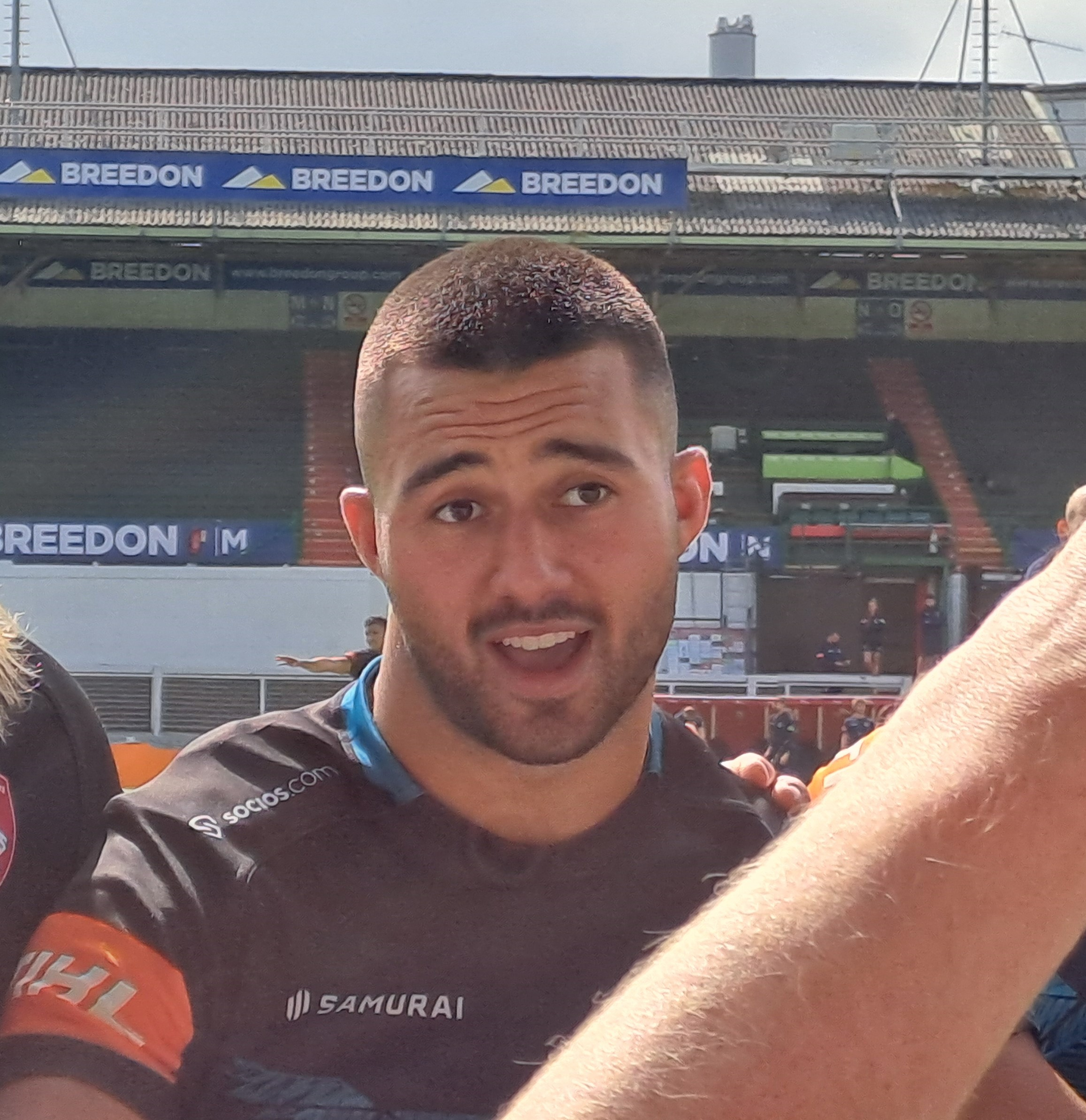
- Kelly speaking to a fan in August 2024
- Born: Daniel Kelly; 16 June 2001 (age 25) Rochdale, Greater Manchester, England
- Height: 6 ft 1 in (185 cm)
- Weight: 15 st 11 lb (221 lb; 100 kg)
- School: Kirkham Grammar School
- University: Loughborough University

Rugby union career
- Position: Centre
- Current team: Munster
Senior career
Years	Team	Apps	(Points)
2019–2020	Loughborough Students	10	(20)
2020–2025	Leicester Tigers	98	(52)
2025–	Munster	22	(25)
- Correct as of 17 October 2026
International career
Years	Team	Apps	(Points)
2020	Ireland U20	4	(5)
2021	England	1	(0)
2025-	Ireland A	2	(0)
- Correct as of 05 February 2026

Daniel Kelly (born 16 June 2001) is a professional rugby union player for Munster in the United Rugby Championship. Between 2020 and 2025 he played 98 times Leicester Tigers. His usual position is centre. Born in Manchester, England, Kelly represented Ireland Under 20s, before being capped for the England national team in 2021. In 2025 he represented Ireland A, tying him to Ireland internationally permanently.

== Early life ==
Kelly started playing rugby at under six years old for Rochdale RUFC, in Greater Manchester. He joined Kirkham Grammar School at 16 and was part of the Sale Sharks academy set up. Due to a number of other players considered more talented he was not offered a professional contract at 18 so joined Loughborough University.

== Club career ==
=== Leicester Tigers ===
On 10 April 2020 Kelly signed for Leicester Tigers, joining for the end of the delayed 2019-20 Premiership Rugby season. He made his debut as a substitute in a 46–30 defeat to Gloucester at Kingsholm. He quickly became a regular starter at inside centre, and by April 2022 was being highlighted by teammates as a defence leader as Leicester prepared for a European Rugby Champions Cup round of 16 tie with Clermont Auvergne.

=== Munster ===
In February 2025, he signed a two-year contract with Munster in the United Rugby Championship ahead of the following season.

== International career ==
Kelly is eligible to play for both England, through birth, and Ireland, through his grandparents.

In 2020, he played for Ireland during the 2020 Six Nations Under 20s Championship, playing all three games of the tournament and scoring a try to win the Triple Crown before the tournament was suspended due to the COVID-19 pandemic.

On 8 July 2021, Kelly has been selected to play for his first cap for England, and he made his international debut for England on 10 July 2021 against Canada at Twickenham. He was part of Leicester's championship winning team in the 2021–22 Premiership Rugby season.
