= Malcolm Phillips =

England international rugby union player

- Born: Malcolm Stanley Phillips; 3 March 1936 (age 90) Prestbury, Cheshire, England
- School: Arnold School, Blackpool
- University: Oxford University

Rugby union career
- Position: Centre
Senior career
Years	Team	Apps	(Points)
- Fylde Rugby Club
- Barbarian FC
- Lancashire
International career
Years	Team	Apps	(Points)
1958-1964	England	25	(50)

Malcolm Phillips is a former rugby union international player who represented England from 1958 to 1964. He was President of the Rugby Football Union in 2004–05, and also served on the International Rugby Board.

== Youth and playing career ==
Phillips was born on 3 March 1936 in Prestbury. He was educated at Arnold School in Blackpool. He then went on to study history at Oxford University, Trinity College, where he played rugby representing the university; captaining the Blues in 1959.

Phillips made his international debut on 1 February 1958 at Twickenham in the England vs Australia match. Of the 25 matches he played for his national side he was on the winning side on 11 occasions. Phillips was known for his running skills and speed that could challenge defences. He played his final match for England on 21 March 1964 at Murrayfield in the Scotland vs England match.

== Rugby administrator ==
Since retirement from playing rugby, Phillips has been active as an administrator. He was President of the Rugby Football Union in 2004/5, during which time he tried to play peacemaker between the squabbling between the chairman of the RFU's management board Graeme Cattermole, and the union's chief executive Francis Baron. Phillips has also served on the International Rugby Board. He is currently actively involved in the administration of Fylde Rugby Club.
