= Andi Kyriacou =

English rugby union player (born 1983)

- Born: Andrew Stephen Kyriacou; 4 January 1983 (age 43) Liverpool, England
- Height: 1.80 m (5 ft 11 in)
- Weight: 105 kg (16.5 st; 231 lb)
- School: Kirkham Grammar School

Rugby union career
- Position: Hooker
Youth career
- Ormskirk RUFC
- West Park RFC
Senior career
Years	Team	Apps	(Points)
2003–2004	Sale Sharks	1	(0)
2003–2004	→ Leeds Carnegie	1	(0)
2004–2009	Saracens	34	(5)
2006–2007	→ Munster (loan)	9	(5)
2009–2012	Ulster	54	(5)
2012–2013	Cardiff Blues	1	(0)
International career
Years	Team	Apps	(Points)
2004	England U21		
2009	Ireland A	2	(0)
- Correct as of 9 October 2021

Andi Kyriacou (born 4 January 1983) is an English-born, Irish-qualified former rugby union player and current coach. Kyriacou played as a hooker for Sale Sharks, Leeds Carnegie, Saracens, Munster, Ulster, and Cardiff Blues before moving into coaching.

== Personal life ==
Kyriacou was born 4 January 1983 in Liverpool, England. He is of Irish and Greek Cypriot heritage. Kyriacou is married to Rebecca and has three children.

== Playing career ==
=== Early playing career ===
Andi Kyriacou started his rugby playing career at Ormskirk RUFC and later moved to West Park RFC in St Helens, Merseyside, where he was amongst a string of Lancashire representatives from the club. From here, Kyriacou represented England at u16 and u18.

=== Sale Sharks 2001–2004 ===
Kyriacou's first senior season in top flight English rugby at Sale Sharks included a debut in the Zurich Premiership.

More recognition came at an international level in 2004, when Kyriacou was part of the England U21 Grand Slam winning side in the U21 Six Nations championship.

=== Saracens and Munster 2004–2009 ===
Kyriacou joined Saracens on 1 July 2004, one of a number of players to make the move from Sale to Saracens in that season including Alex Sanderson, Iain Fullarton and Kevin Yates, as well as Matt Cairns who was returning to the club after a single season with the Sharks. He made his debut in European competition against Rugby Parma on 4 December of that year, with his Guinness Premiership debut soon after 2005–06 .

Working alongside Matt Cairns, Fabio Ongaro and Shane Byrne, Kyriacou was selected by Declan Kidney to join Munster Rugby for the 2006–07 season, making multiple appearances for the club in both their Celtic League and Heineken Cup campaigns. The playing experience drawn from Munster Rugby meant that the 2007–08 season presented greater opportunities for Kyriacou back with Saracens, ready for their 2007/8 European Cup campaign.

=== Ulster Rugby 2009–2012 ===
In July 2009, Kyriacou signed a contract with Ulster Rugby. Whilst at Ulster, Kyriacou was selected for the Ireland squad and was capped for the Ireland Wolfhounds.

=== Injury and retirement ===
Kyriacou signed a two-year contract at Cardiff Blues at the beginning of the 2012–13 Pro 12, but his anticipated place as first-choice hooker and his playing career was cut short by a serious neck injury early in the season.

== Coaching career ==
Cardiff Blues then signed Kyriacou in a coaching role, supervising the scrum and skills in the first instance, later moving on to coach the forwards. In 2015, Kyriacou went on to become the forwards coach for Russia Rugby, alongside working as the scrum coach for his original club Sale Sharks. Kyriacou was signed by Nottingham Rugby as Defence and Forwards Coach at the beginning of the 2018/19 season, where he built one of the most successful defensive systems and strongest packs in The Championship.

Ahead of the 2021–22 season, Kyriacou joined Irish province Munster's academy as a forwards coach, with time spent as an assistant coach with the Ireland 18s group. Kyriacou had spent time on loan with the province during his playing career. Kyriacou was promoted to forwards coach with Munster's senior squad on a two-year contract from the 2022–23 season, when previous forwards coach Graham Rowntree was promoted to head coach. Following Munster’s URC title-winning campaign, it was announced that Kyriacou had signed a contract extension with Munster until the end of the 2026-27 season.

Kyriacou joined Portugal Rugby as Defence and Forwards Coach from the 2025-26 season, which culminated in beating Georgia in the Rugby Europe Championship. During this campaign Kyriacou’s defence was recorded as the best in the championship.
