= Eccles RFC =

Rugby Union team in Eccles, Lancashire

(England) Eccles
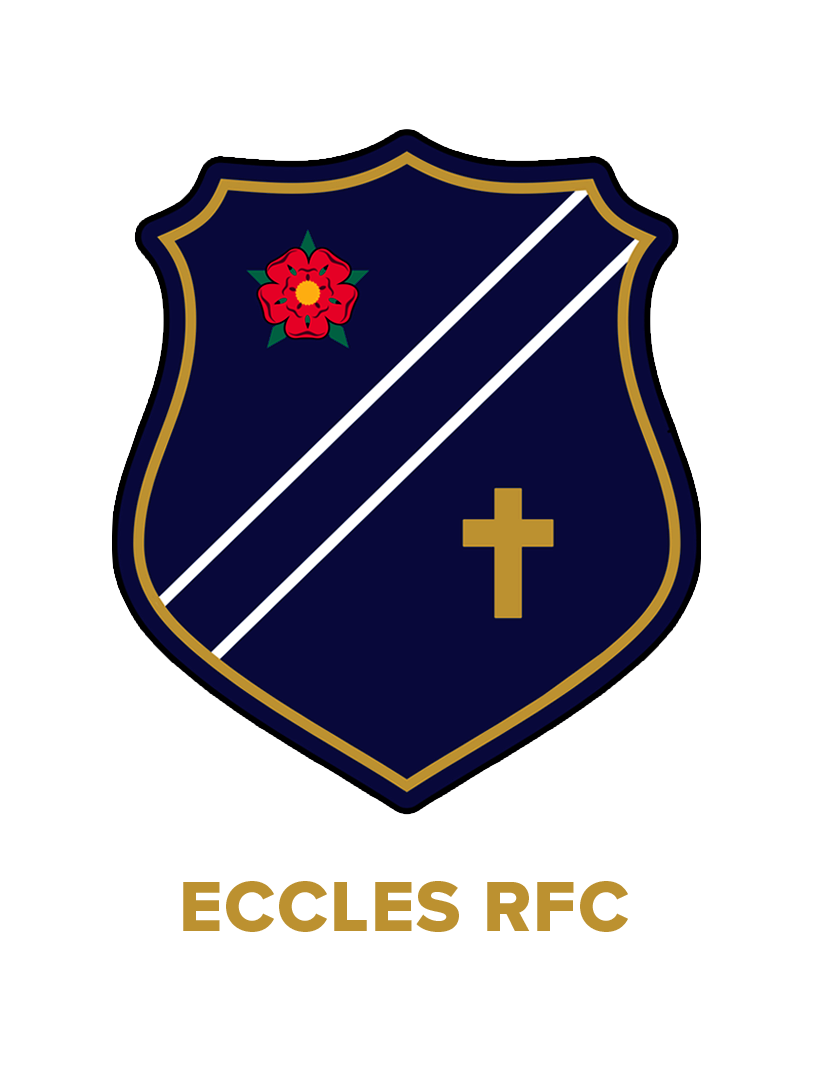
- Full name: Eccles Rugby Football Club
- Union: Lancashire RFU
- Founded: 1897; 129 years ago
- Location: Eccles, Salford, England.
- Ground: Gorton Street
- Chairman: Chris Gaffey
- President: Alan Bent
- Coach: Sam Simpson
- League: Counties 1 ADM Lancashire & Cheshire
Principle kit	Change kit

Official website
- eccles.rfu.club

Eccles Rugby Football Club is a rugby union club based in Eccles, Salford, Greater Manchester, England. Established in 1878 and re-founded in 1897, the club’s home ground has been located at Gorton Street, Eccles since 1948.

The club operates three Senior Men’s teams, a Senior Women’s team and 16 age-grade teams (Minis, Juniors, Girls and Colts) U6s to U18s.

The Men’s first XV team currently plays in Counties 1, the seventh tier of the English rugby union system, following relegation from Regional 2 at the end of 2024-25 season. The Women’s first XV team currently compete in the Women’s NC 2 North, the fifth tier of the Rugby Football Union for Women.

The club's playing colours are navy and white hooped shirts, navy shorts and navy and white hooped socks. The club's badge features a Lancastrian red rose and a gold cross in reference to the ecclesiastical origins of Eccles.

== History ==
=== Establishment ===
Eccles RFC played its first recorded game on Saturday 19th October 1878, with published match reports confirming home and away victories against Rossendale at Eccles and against Leigh at Leigh, depicting a well established club with the ability to field two teams on the same afternoon. Eccles continued to play its home fixtures at Higher Bentcliffe Park, Eccles for several seasons. In January 1881 Eccles won the regional Cup competition organised by Swinton Lions, beating Clifton in the Final with 2 goals and 1 try, to nil in front of 1,300 spectators at Swinton’s Stoneacre ground.

Eccles RFC became a member of the Lancashire County Union in 1886 and joined the RFU in 1887 with membership lapsing during the bitter severance and upheaval of rugby by the Northern Union schism in 1895. Eccles RFC was re-established in 1897 playing at a ground in Monton and in 1899 moved to take over the former ground of Barton NUFC, a defunct Northern Union club who had folded in 1898. At this time the Eccles Captain was County player J.E. Kidd, who would later go on to be Lancashire President. In 1901, Eccles moved a short distance to a larger enclosure on Edison Road, near the junction with Peel Green Road and the Barton Swing Bridge and Aqueduct on the banks of the Manchester Ship Canal, and were to remain here until the commencement of World War I in August 1914, playing the principle clubs of Lancashire, Yorkshire, Westmorland and Cheshire. The district of Barton provided the club with strong local support, with large crowds attracted to see Eccles play home and away, with Eccles players R. Smalley, G.E. Ainsworth, Reid Cameron, Tommy Stephens, Harold Bowker and Reginald Bolton selected for Lancashire County representation.

In the early years Eccles played their rugby wearing green jerseys, changing to a navy and white hooped shirt when fixtures recommenced after World War I. Eccles continued to lead a nomadic existence between the wars, resuming its rugby activities on 25th October 1919 with a game against Fylde at Stott Lane, Salford, with fixtures against Manchester, Broughton Park and Bowdon Rangers amongst others following that same season. In 1921 the club moved to Alder Forest, Worsley and in 1925 moved again to Redclyffe Road, facing Barton Power Station, remaining here until the outbreak of World War II, with John Coatman, CIE, North Regional Controller of the BBC becoming Vice-President of his old club in 1937.

After the war, the club revived its activities once again and on the 2nd of October 1948, Eccles RFC played its first home game at their new ground on Gorton Street, Peel Green, Eccles where they have remained since.

Consolidation

Eccles RFC grew in reputation and membership in the 1950s with the club fielding four teams. In 1955 former Eccles fullback Harry Scott, who went on to record a distinguished career with Manchester and Lancashire, gained an England cap against France at Twickenham. In the late 1960s, Broughton Park introduced the Griffon Plaque knock out competition for teams in the Manchester region, with Eccles reaching the final on ten occasions in fifteen years, winning the competition seven times in 1971, 1973, 1974, 1975, 1977, 1983 and 1985. To consolidate this success a new clubhouse was constructed at the Gorton Street ground between 1983 and 1984, with new changing facilities added in 1993.

Expansion

With the purpose of producing homegrown players, Eccles RFC established Colts Rugby in 1962 and a Mini & Junior Rugby section in 1991 with Senior players delivering coaching, Juniors achieving County honours and facilities developing to accommodate a diverse and growing membership. Eccles introduced a Ladies team in 1997 and introduced Girls rugby in 2013, with players Detysha Harper, Hollie Bawden and Alicia Calton recruited to play professionally for Sale Sharks Women.

In 2014 the Men's 1XV earned promotion to level 6 of the Rugby Union structure, an achievement they would repeat in 2024. In October 2014 Eccles RFC was selected to host a RFU festival aimed at increasing national state school participation in rugby with HRH Prince Harry attending the club. The honours continued in July 2015 when Eccles RFC were selected to host the Webb Ellis Cup on its tour ahead of the World Cup in England, with the club also hosting the Women's Rugby World Cup Trophy in May 2025.

In 2023 Eccles Colt Jack Lightbown was selected for the England U18 squad to face France, Italy , Ireland and Tour South Africa, joining former Eccles Junior and Sale Sharks Academy graduate, Tumy Onasayna who was selected for the 2022 England U20 Squad. In 2024, after 125 years of playing in white shorts, Eccles RFC switched to Navy Blue shorts in support of women’s and girls rugby when concerns about period anxiety were raised at the club Annual General Meeting. In the same year the club was recognised with the Kings Award for Voluntary Service (KAVS), an honour equivalent to an MBE, for its promotion of Rugby Union in its community.

== Honours ==
Lancashire RFU Club of the Year 2014, 2024

Kings Award for Voluntary Service in 2024

Men's Honours

Lancashire County Plate Winners 2009, 2022, 2023

Counties 2 ADM Lancashire & Cheshire Champions 2022/23

North Lancashire 2 Champions 1994/95

Women's Honours

RFUW North 2 Champions 2010/11
