= Burnage Rugby =

English rugby union club, based in Greater Manchester

Burnage RFC
- Full name: Burnage Rugby Football Club
- Union: Lancashire RFU
- Founded: 1936; 90 years ago
- Location: Stockport, Greater Manchester, England
- Ground: Varley Park
- Chairman: William Blackmore
- President: Steve Willock
- Coach(es): Director of Rugby Adam Taher, Head Coach Mike Avis, Backs Coach Stu Oldham, Forwards Coach Henry Gong.
- Captain: Jordan Chappell
- League: Regional 2 North West
- 2025–26: 6th
Team kit

Official website
- www.pitchero.com/clubs/burnage/

Burnage Rugby Football Club is an English rugby union team based in Stockport, Greater Manchester. The club runs four senior sides, a colts team and an under-15s side. The first XV plays in Regional 2 North West, a level six league in the English rugby union system. Recently, the club has established an academy, for boys and girls from age under-5 through to under-15

== History ==
Burnage Rugby Club was founded as an old boys' club for ex-pupils of Burnage High School in 1936. The club moved from Burnage in South Manchester to a new site at Heaton Mersey in Stockport in the 1970s.

== Ground and facilities ==
As well as three rugby pitches (4G plus two traditional grass pitches), the site includes a par 3, 9-hole golf and foot-golf course (Heaton Mersey Valley Golf Course) and 3G artificial rugby and football pitches.

== Honours ==
- North Lancs 2 champions: 1998–99
- Cumbria v North Lancashire 1 promotion play-off winners: 2004–05
- South Lancs/Cheshire 1 champions: 2008–09
- North 1 (east v west) promotion play-off winners: 2010–11
- North 1 West champions: 2019–20
