= Thomas Kelly (rugby union) =

England international rugby union player

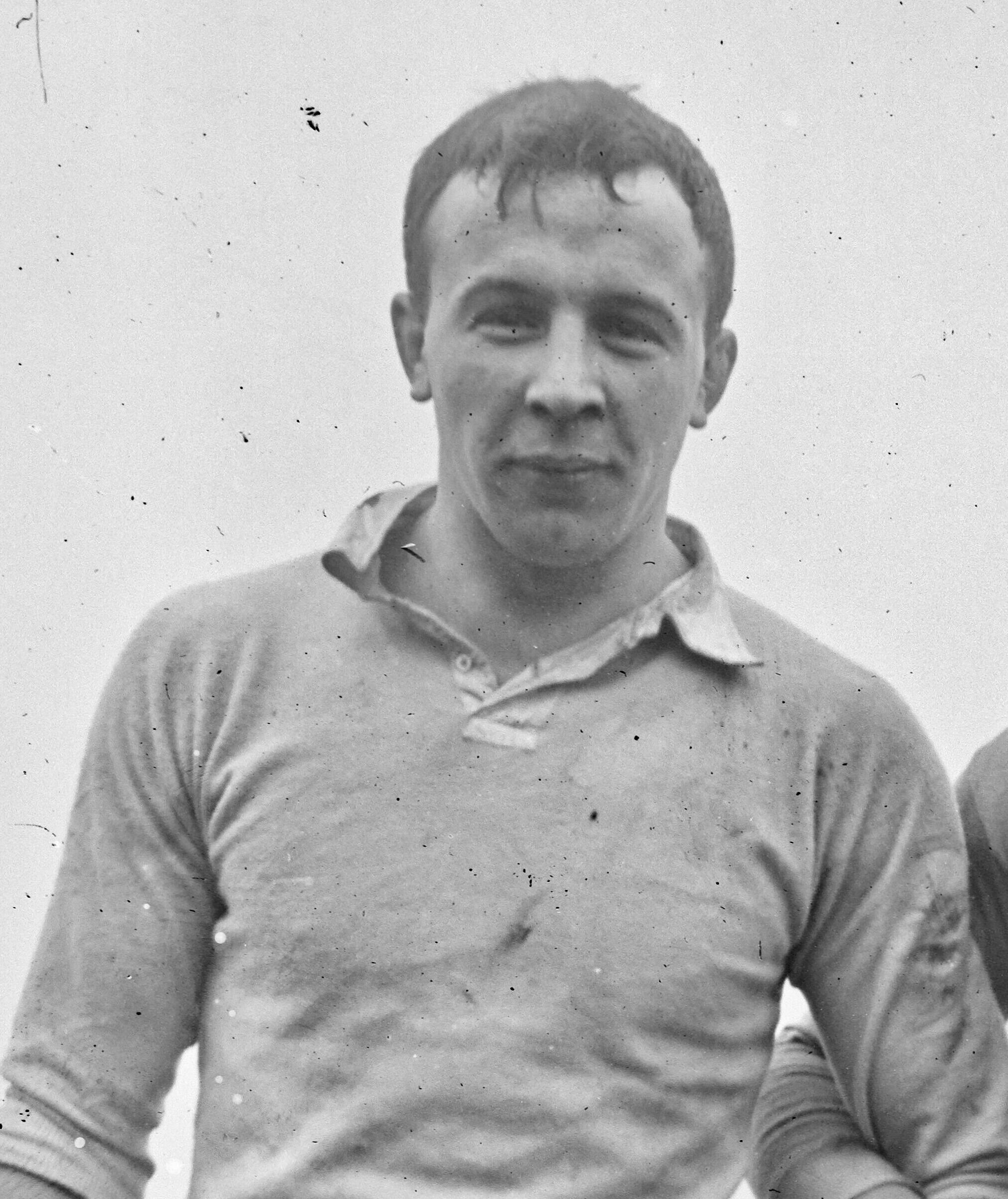
- Born: Thomas Stanley Kelly; 1882 Tiverton, Devon, England
- Died: 1959 (aged 76–77)
- School: Blundell's School

Rugby union career
- Position: Lock
Senior career
Years	Team	Apps	(Points)
- Exeter Rugby Club
- London Devonians
- London Civil Service
- Liverpool OBs
- Harlequins
- Devon
–	Lancashire		
International career
Years	Team	Apps	(Points)
1906–1908	England	12	(0)

Thomas Kelly (1882–1959) was a rugby union international who represented England from 1906 to 1908. He also captained his country to a 19–0 victory over France at the Stade Colombes in Paris on 1 January 1908.

== Early life ==
Thomas Kelly was born in 1882 in Tiverton, Devon. and educated at Blundell's School.

== Rugby union career ==
Kelly played Lock for Exeter Rugby Club and is the only player from that team to have captained England. He also turned out for Devon County in 39 games between 1903 and 1910, including games against New Zealand, South Africa and Australia. In the 1908–09 match against Australia, he scored the only try against the visitors. As well as playing for Devon he also played for the Lancashire County Team. After playing for Exeter he also played for London Devonians, London Civil Service, Liverpool OBs and Harlequins. Kelly played a total of 12 matches for England, but only one as captain. He made his international debut on 13 January 1906 at the Athletic Ground, Richmond in the England vs Wales match. Of the 12 matches he played for his national side he was on the winning side on 5 occasions. He played his final match for England on 21 March 1908 at Inverleith in the Scotland vs England match.

== Life outside sport ==
Known as Stanley Kelly after his time at Blundell's School, he joined the Civil Service, working in Customs and Excise.
