= Joe Mills (rugby union) =

English rugby union player

Joseph Mills
- Full name: Joseph Mills
- Born: unknown
- Died: unknown

Rugby union career
Senior career
Years	Team	Apps	(Points)
1875-91	Swinton		
–	Lancashire		

Joseph Mills (birth unknown – death unknown) was an English rugby union footballer who played in the 1870s, 1880s and 1890s. He played at representative level for Lancashire (captain), and at club level for Swinton (captain). Prior to Tuesday 2 June 1896, Swinton were a rugby union club.

== Playing career ==
Joe Mills won caps for Lancashire (captain) while at Swinton. He was selected for The North of England versus The South of England, and he was twice named a reserve for England.

== Outside of rugby ==
Joe Mills was the landlord of the Bull's Head pub on Chorley Road, Swinton.
