= West Park St Helens =

English rugby union club, based in St Helens, Merseyside

West Park
- Full name: West Park (St Helens) RFC
- Union: Lancashire RFU
- Founded: 1947; 79 years ago
- Location: St Helens, Merseyside, England
- Ground: Red Rocks
- Coach(es): Ben Mousley, Maurie Faasavalu, Jack Winstanley, Rob Morley
- Captain: Liam Hill
- League: Counties 1 ADM Lancashire & Cheshire
- 2024–25: 1st (promoted to Regional 2 North West)
Team kit

Official website
- westparksthelens.rfu.club

West Park (St Helens) RFC is a rugby union club based in St Helens, Merseyside. The 1st XV currently play in the Regional 2 North West at the sixth level of the English rugby union system, following their promotion from Counties 1 adm Lancashire & Cheshire at the end of the 2024–25 season.

== Early years ==
West Park RFC was formally established in August 1947 at a meeting held in the Black Bull Hotel, though occasional matches had been played the previous season under the title "Catholic Grammar School Old Boys." Games were played on the abbreviated school pitch and in 1950 the club acquired their first home pitch, named the "Rose Bowl". The team regularly had to collect debris that had erupted from the ground, and on one occasion a match was interrupted whilst a full-sized perambulator was excavated.

Another match venue was the Alder Hey Road field: "Remarkable for the depth of its mud, making Passchendaele and Ypres look like the Gobi desert in high summer."

After exhaustive searches by club officials, the land was eventually leased at Red Rocks, Eccleston Hill for the season 1954/55. Club members spent the season – on what is now Carmel College playing fields – digging drains with the help of an elderly milk horse, called Dolly, borrowed from Friths' Farm. The same season saw the opening of the club's first dressing rooms and club room, which were simple enough that one passer-by thought the building was a new public convenience. Periodic improvements and extensions resulted in the fields' state today.

The original pitches were lost in a land deal which allowed Education Authority land to be used by Pilkingtons for their Head Office and the War Department to gain room for expansion off Croppers Hill, which saw Carmel College to be erected. The land where the present pitches are situated was acquired in 1960/61 and an extensive earth-moving operation was required to produce the current two pitches on a split-level arrangement.

In recent years, the clubhouse required extensive renovation when affected by subsidence from a burst water main.

== 1950s – 1970s ==
West Park's first trophy was won at the Caldy Sevens in 1953, and as runners-up at both the Birkenhead Park Sevens and Manchester Sevens tournaments. Season 1953/54 saw the first fifteen unbeaten throughout and in 1957/58 membership was opened to all instead of limitation to 'Old Boys of West Park School' and 'Invited Guests'. Although many players moved on to senior clubs to gain county and, in the case of Martin Regan, international honours, David Griffiths became the first serving West Park player to be selected for Lancashire.

West Park's inaugural trip was to Éire where they gained victory in the Kildare Sevens tournament. Positive results in Sevens during the next few years enhanced the club reputation.

Don Gullick was appointed as team coach in 1968. In 1962, the first Colts team was formed, and this provided a source of players to supplement the regular intake from West Park School, which was to cease in years to come with the school closure. Although the Colts have figured intermittently over the years, in recent seasons Neil Ashurst, Martin Strett and Sean Fletcher all gained international honours at this age group. Veteran Fifteens took to the field for several seasons as membership expanded and, more recently, a Junior Section was formed for age groups from under-9s up to under-16s, plus a Youth Section including both Junior and Senior Colts teams.

== 1970s onwards ==
In pre-league rugby union days, the Lancashire RFU was one of the stronger teams in the county, and it was a sign of West Park's progress that in the 70s, Mike Glover, Rob Briers, Bernard Barrow, Bill Lawrenson and Barrie Barton gained County honours. Glover and Briers were in the County side that won the Championship in 1972/73. Rob Briers went on to gain 44 County caps and to represent both the North and England under-23s.

Players began being recruited by the senior clubs, and in succeeding years, West Park regularly had to rebuild their side. The 'Professional Code', as it was then known, was also not slow in recognising rugby talent, and in one season sevens players turned to Rugby league, with two going on to International honours.

West Park was forced to travel as far as Northumberland, South Wales, the Midlands and Yorkshire in order to meet stronger opposition, with some notable performances being registered in pre-league days. Strong results in the Lancashire Cup (twice as semi-finalists, once as runners-up) and in the Lancashire Trophy (twice winners) were interspersed with early success in the pioneer Girobank League structure. West Park was rewarded with a place in the North West 1st Division at the start, and when full RFU leagues were inaugurated, they narrowly missed obtaining National status by finishing just one position from promotion.

In addition to tours to Ireland and South Wales, West Park have twice visited the Americas (USA & Canada)

Many former players play an active role in the running of the club. Several of the original founder team members are still active, including Ken Ward. Well known individuals over the years include Mike Allen, John Howard, Malcolm Worsley, Graham Houghton (the longest serving captain), Bernard Barrow, Dennis Glynn, and Austin Sweeney.

At the start of the National Leagues in 1987/88, West Park was in North Division 1, from which they narrowly missed promotion. Unfortunately, an exodus of some of the best players meant that, as mentioned before, team rebuilding had to begin again with the inevitable result of relegation to North Division 2, and then to North West 1.

== Golden Jubilee ==
In 1997, celebrations of West Park's 50th Anniversary started early with a Grand Ball held in May.

== Modern era ==
In the '99/'00 season, Rob Briers was elected President of Lancashire, and was the first West Park member ever to be appointed.

In the 2000/2001 season, the team played against Vale of Lune, Broughton Park, Widnes, Winnington Park, Lymm, Blackburn and Aldwinians in the newly formed North 2 (West) league. West Park was promoted as champions. Three of the Colts players, Chris Briers, Andi Kyriacou and Ian Critchley, were recognised at England under-18s Schools level, while former-Colt, Chris Jones, was recognised at England Under-19s. All have now moved on: Andi, Chris and Chris to Sale Sharks while Ian has gone to London Irish, where he joined another former West Park player, Mike Worsley, who himself received his first full England cap against Italy in the 2003 Six Nations tournament. The Under-16s won the Lancashire Cup under Jeff Lawrenson and John Mather.

The 2001/2002 featured matches against Bradford & Bingley, Macclesfield, Halifax, Hull Ionians, Sheffield, Driffield and Darlington in North Division 1. The team led for most of the season, but eventually finished third. This season also saw the formation of West Park Warriors (formerly the 3rd XV) who played well enough to consolidate their new position in North Lancs Division 2. This resulted in more players signing for the club, and the creation of the 4th XV. This season also witnessed the passing on of six founder members: Joe McCormack, Vint Wynn, Tony Greenhall, Harry Huyton, Des Platt and Fred Burrows, all within six weeks of each other. The Under-17s won the Lancashire Cup under Jeff Lawrenson and John Mather.

2002/2003 proved to be a consolidation season in North Division 1 with a number of retirements by the older players and the introduction of several youngsters, eventually finishing 7th after escaping from the relegation dogfight. Sean Fletcher was replaced by 22-year-old Liam McLoughlin as club captain towards the end of the season after sustaining a serious eye injury which has resulted in his early retirement from the playing staff. The Under-18s won the Under-19s Lancashire Cup, their third successive Lancashire Cup win under Jeff Lawrenson and John Mather.

2003/2004 saw the 1st XV challenging again to reach the National Leagues from Powergen North Division 1; the 2nd XV taking their place in the newly formed North West Intermediate League Division 1, after two seasons in the North West Merit Table; and West Park Warriors reaching Division 1 after being promoted from Division 2 as champions.

2004–05 Liam McLoughlin was appointed captain again, but left for Orrell. Martin Jones continued as club coach.

New Zealand Sports Academy, a Rotorua-based academy that helps to develop young Maori rugby Players, has formed a relationship with West Park. They brought two young Maori players, Clint Lockwood and Mattie Henwood.

West Park won the Lancashire Cup with newly appointed captain Carl Newman picking up the cup, after beating Preston Grasshoppers at Sedgley Park, they also won the Lancashire Sevens at Blackburn overcoming Leeds Tykes in the final.

West Park's Rob Briers was appointed Lancashire representative to the Council of the Rugby Football Union. Proposed Re-development plans published, included turning the pitches around creating 3 pitches, also a new clubhouse.

Sponsor of many years, John Graham Smith, died on 8 April 2005.

2005–06 Carl Newman continued as captain, also Martin Jones continued as club coach. West Park qualified for the National Leagues for the first time in their history.

In the 2010–11 Season, the West Park Warriors, in their last season as a team won the Lancashire Bowl Competition.

In the 2017-18 Season, the Colts won the Lancashire Cup under Stu Holland and Mike Thompson.

In 2023, the first team ended their near 20 year wait for silverware, securing the Brian Leigh Lancashire trophy against De La Salle RUFC (Salford) at Wigan, with the final score standing at 14 - 21 in favour of the men in green and gold.

In the 2024/25 season, West Park earned their first league title on the final day of the season. With park only needing 2 points to secure the league outright, on the day, they put on a dominant performance against then second placed Didsbury to secure the league title. This season saw a streak of wins before the Christmas break, a few stutters following a Christmas hangover, with 1 home, and 2 away defeats.

== Honours ==
1st team:

- North West 1 champions: 1999–00
- North Division 2 West champions: 2000–01
- Lancashire Cup winners (2): 2000, 2005
- North 1 v Midlands 1 promotion play-off winners: 2005–06
- North Lancashire/Cumbria v South Lancs/Cheshire 1 promotion play-off winners: 2015–16
- Lancashire Trophy Winners: 2023
- ADM Counties 1 - Lancashire & Cheshire Champions: 2024–25

West Park Warriors:

- North Lancs 2 champions: 2002–03
- South Lancs/Cheshire 4 champions: 2008–09
