= Sefton RUFC =

English rugby union club, based in Liverpool, Merseyside

(England) Sefton RUFC
- Union: Lancashire RFU
- Founded: 1907; 119 years ago
- Location: Liverpool, England
- Ground: Thornhead Lane
- Chairman: C McCleary
- President: J Luck
- Coach: D Saunders
- Captain: S Caine
- Top scorer: Wayne Osbourne
- League: North 2 West
- 2019–20: 14th (relegated to Lancs/Cheshire 1) 1XV Kit

Official website
- www.seftonrufc.co.uk

Sefton Rugby Union Football Club is an amateur rugby union team based in Liverpool, England. Sefton is the oldest established Rugby Union Club in Liverpool. Situated in the West Derby district of the city, the Club can now claim to field sides from all age groups most weeks of the season.

== Current squad ==
Current Squad
Name	Position	Nationality	Team
Jack Armstrong	Hooker	ENG	1XV
Billy Coulter	Hooker	IRE	1XV
Brian Gardner	Prop	ENG	1XV
Stuart Bailey (c)	Prop	ENG	1XV
James Letherbarrow	Prop	ENG	1XV
Kevin Mainwaring	Prop	ENG	1XV
Grant Leary	Lock	ENG	1XV
Geraint Thomas	Lock	WAL	1XV
John Evans	Flanker	ENG	1XV
Louis Kempster	Flanker	ENG	1XV
Tom Fletcher	No 8	ENG	1XV
Nathan Smith	No 8	ENG	1XV
Matthew Thomas	Scrum-half	WAL	1XV
Jamie Luck	Scrum-half	WAL	1XV
Adam Marnell	Fly-half	ENG	1XV
Wayne Osbourne	Fly-half	ENG	1XV
Stephen Moffatt	Centre	ENG	1XV
Pete Hamlin	Centre	IRE	1XV
Colin Pascoe	Centre	ENG	1XV
Jamie Cuthbertson	Wing	SCO	1XV
Dave Stanistreet	Wing	ENG	1XV
Andy Thompson	Wing	ENG	1XV
Liam Brown	Full back	ENG	1XV
James Corlett	Full back	ENG	1XV

== Location ==
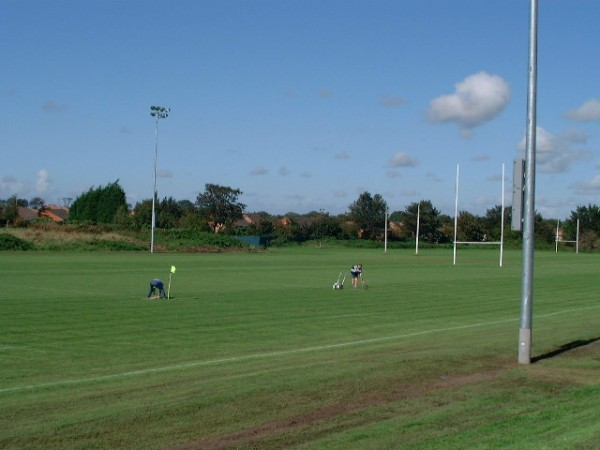
Sefton 1XV Pitch having drainage work done on it.

Sefton RUFC Is located on Thornhead Lane in the West Derby area of Liverpool, Just of Leyfield Road. The clubhouse has had a lot of work done to it in recent years. Most notably including the installation of a brand new kitchen and flooring throughout the changing rooms. The club also has its own carpark that is capable of holding all the cars visiting on busy match days. Sefton has three rugby pitches that are maintained throughout the year. currently two of those pitches are equipped with full pitch flood lights and there are plans to get the third pitch flood lit too. Sefton's 1XV pitch has had a lot of time and money invested into it, In 2010 receiving a drainage system to help prevent any waterlogged games.

== Club honours ==
- South Lancs/Cheshire 2 champions (2): 1992–93, 2012–13 (Note: The 1992–93 title win was for the 'Lancashire South' league back when South Lancs/Cheshire 2 was split into two regional divisions.)
