= Vale of Lune RUFC =

English rugby union club, based in Lancaster, Lancashire

Vale of Lune
- Full name: Vale of Lune Rugby Union Football Club
- Union: Lancashire RFU
- Founded: 1900; 126 years ago
- Location: Lancaster, Lancashire, England
- Ground: Powder House Lane (Capacity: 4,000 (50 seated) (Note: A ground capacity estimate by the club back in 1990 was 9,860 including 360 seats. Recent changes, such as the removal of a covered stand and updated health and safety standards mean the current capacity is much reduced.))
- President: Dave Baggot
- Coach: Mark Goodman
- Captain: Jack Ayrton
- League: Regional 2 North West
- 2025–26: 2nd (won promotion to Regional 1 North West via a play-off)
Team kit

Official website
- www.pitchero.com/clubs/valeoflunerufc/

Vale of Lune Rugby Union Football Club is an English rugby union club based in Lancaster. The first team currently play in Regional 1 North West, a level five league in the English league system, following the club's promotion from Regional 2 North West at the end of the 2025–26 season. The club has three male senior teams, a senior colts side, and mini & junior sections with teams from under-6's to under-16's.

Herbert Storey, a High Sheriff of Lancashire, was among those who founded the club. The club moved to its current Powder House Lane ground in 1905, with its first game being on 23rd September against Liverpool Old Boys.

== Ground ==
Vale of Lune have been based at Powder House Lane since 1905. When the club were the Courage Leagues in the late 1980s and early 1990s, the ground capacity was listed as being an impressive 9,860 (360 seats, 9,500 standing) and facilities included a club house with two bars. As the club dropped down the league structure into the 21st century, capacity was much reduced with the main covered stand being removed and replaced by a modern club house.

For a modern estimate and taken into account health and safety, the ground would probably allow a maximum capacity of 4,000. The east side of the ground has a new 50 seater stand and there is substantial old terracing, which could accommodate up to 2,000 people, the north side has a slope which could take around 500 people and standing on standing on the west and south sides would probably host a further 1,000, given a total of around 4,000, including the seating, less than half of the original capacity.

== Honours ==
- Lancashire Cup winners (2): 1986, 1992
- North 1 West champions (2): 2002–03, 2017–18
- North Lancashire/Cumbria v South Lancs/Cheshire 1 promotion play-off winner: 2008–09
- Regional 2 North West promotion play-off winner; 2025–26
