= Joe Mills (footballer) =

English footballer

Personal information
- Full name: Joseph Mills
- Date of birth: 10 April 1895
- Place of birth: Creswell, Derbyshire, England
- Date of death: 1938 (aged 42–43)
- Position: Wing half

Senior career*
Years	Team	Apps	(Gls)
1913–1914	Red Row		
1914–1915	Whitwell St Lawrence		
1919–1924	Nottingham Forest	43	(0)
1924–1925	Luton Town	31	(2)
1925–1926	Bentley Colliery		
1926–1927	Thorne Colliery		
1927	Olympia Cake & Oil (Selby)		
Total		74	(2)
- * Club domestic league appearances and goals

Joseph Mills (2 December 1895 – 1979) was an English footballer who played in the Football League for Luton Town and Nottingham Forest.
