= Lancashire County Rugby Football Union =

Rugby union in England

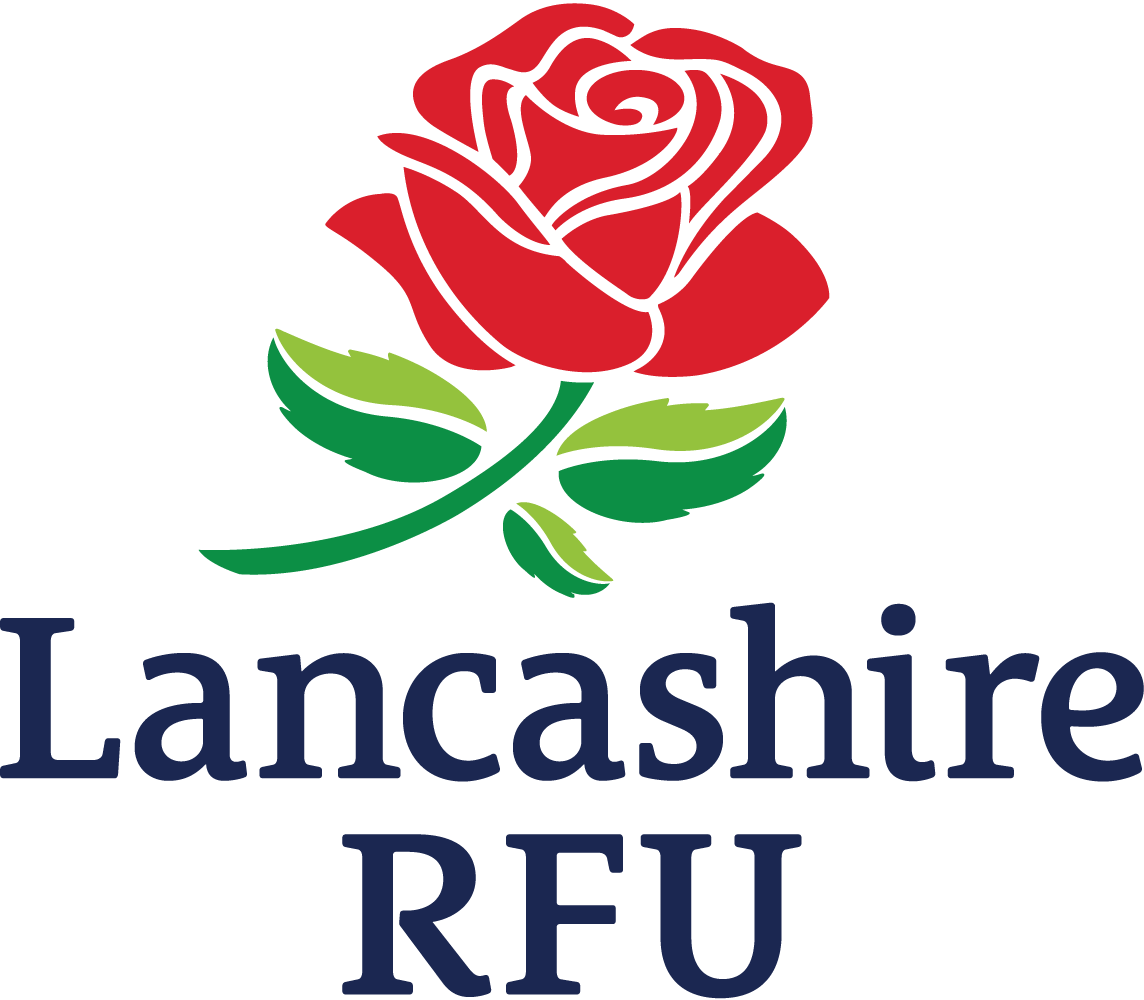
- Sport: Rugby union
- Jurisdiction: Lancashire (historic)
- Membership: RFU
- Abbreviation: Lancashire RFU
- Founded: 1881; 145 years ago
- President: Robbie Jones
- Chairman: Dave Clarke
- Board members: Dave Clarke, Mark Downs, Paul Deakin, Howard Hughes, Carol Baker, Gill Burns, Kate Bennetta, Chris Gaffey, Arthur Crabtree.
- Secretary: Mark Downs
- Men's coach: Alex Loney
- Women's coach: Ben Hyde
- (England)

Eccles

The Lancashire County Rugby Football Union is the society responsible for rugby union in the county of Lancashire, England, and is one of the constituent bodies of the national Rugby Football Union having been formed in 1881. In addition it is the county that has won the County Championship on most occasions

== History ==
=== Early years ===
The first match arranged for the county of Lancashire took place in 1870, at Leeds against Yorkshire. This match was immediately known as the "Battle of the Roses" and was considered the "blue riband" of Northern rugby football. To be selected to represent the county was an honour bestowed long before the foundation of the Lancashire RFU and it was seen as "the high road to International honours".

=== Formation of a Football Union ===
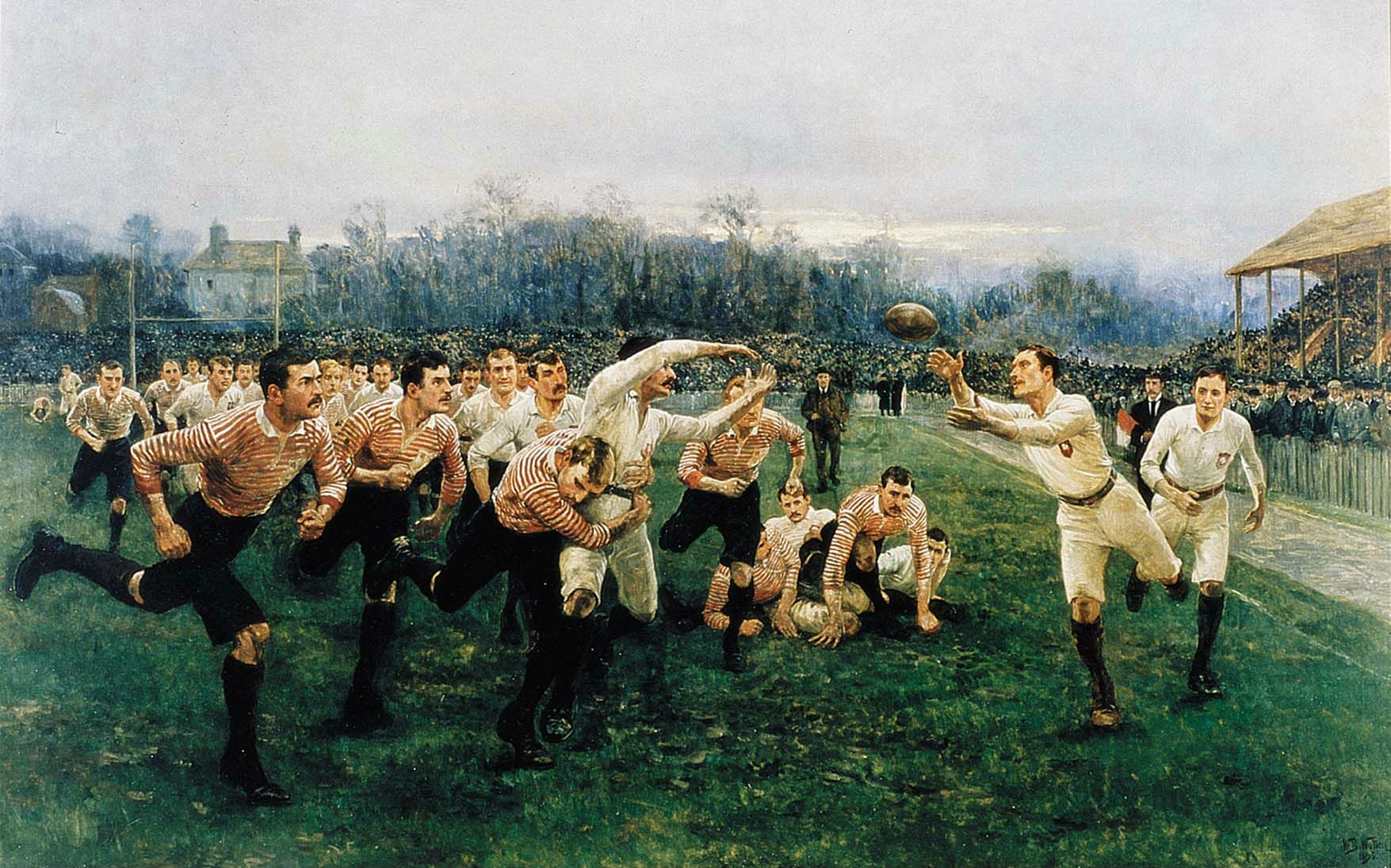
The Battle of the Roses, depiction of a match between Yorkshire and Lancashire in 1893. Painting by William Barnes Wollen

From 1870 to 1881 the government and arrangement of county matches in Lancashire vested in Manchester Football Club. Though self-appointed, Manchester FC was recognised as the authority by the other great Lancashire club, Liverpool St. Helens. A movement of emerging new clubs, headed by W. Bell, the honorary secretary of the Broughton FC, had an objective to secure a voice in the selection of county teams. Bell was supported by an informal committee consisting of: G. C. Lindsay (Manchester Rangers), A. M. Crook (Free Wanderers), F. C. Hignett (Swinton), Hunter (Birch).

Initial approaches to the Manchester Club were declined and in 1881 a general meeting of Lancashire clubs was called at which the following clubs were represented: Manchester Rangers; Free Wanderers; Broughton; Swinton; Walton; Rossendale; Oldham; Manchester Athletic; Rochdale Hornets; Chorley Birch; and Cheetham. Notably, the Manchester Club did not take part, but a resolution to form the Lancashire Football Union was agreed. The initial committee had W. Bell as its honorary secretary and G. C. Lindsay as the honorary treasurer.

Two county matches were arranged altogether versus the Midland Counties and Lanarkshire (Scotland). Manchester then decided to wrest control of the county back and on 22 December 1881 met with the new Union and a duly constituted and representative governing body, its club to be called The Lancashire County Football Club, was formed. It was agreed the president, a vice-president, the hon. secretary and treasurer should be elected from the Manchester Football Club, a vice-president and a member of committee from the Liverpool Club, and the remaining eight names to be elected from clubs other than the Manchester and Liverpool clubs. Also, all Home County matches would be played on the ground of the Manchester Football Club.

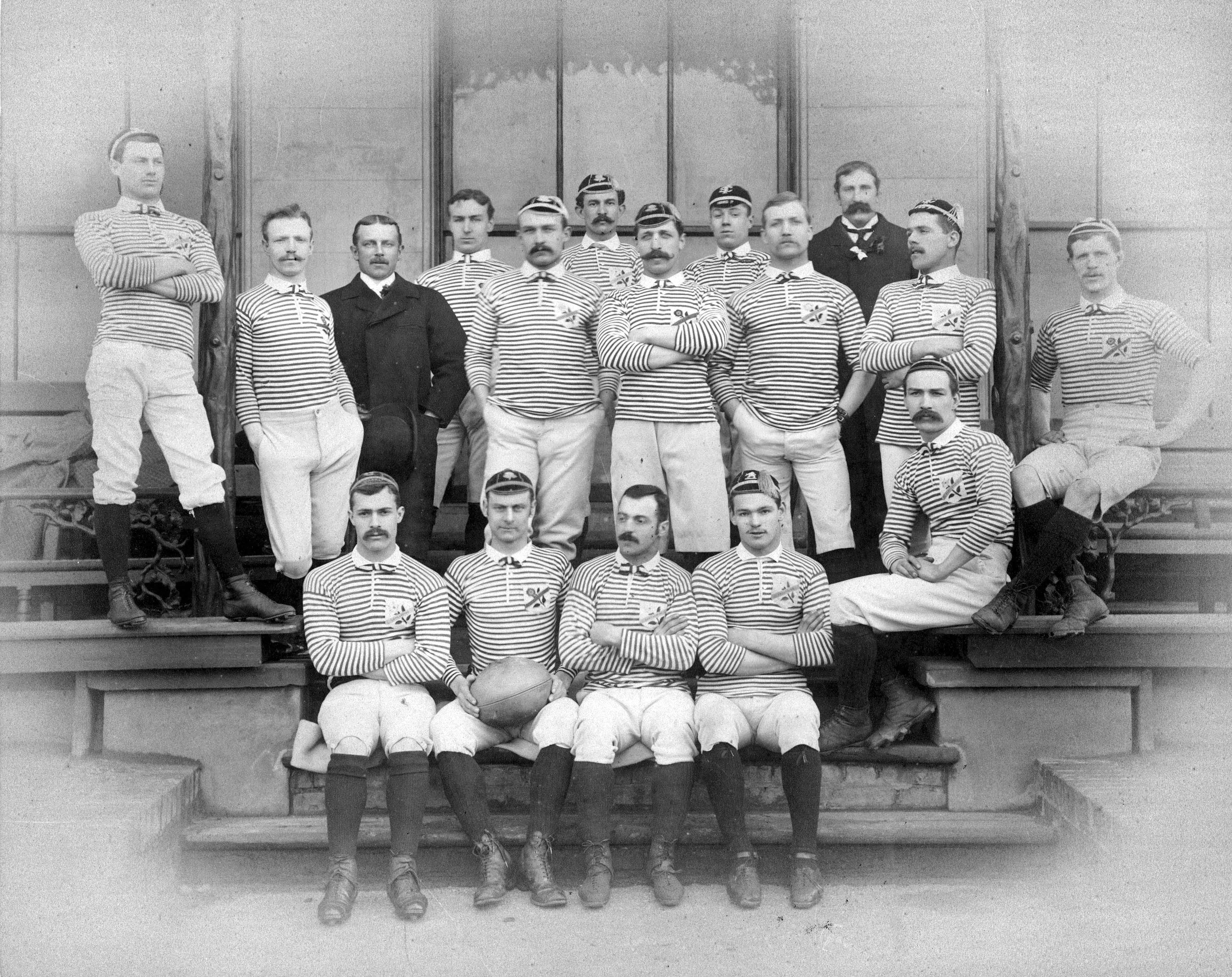
The Lancashire team before a match against Middlesex in 1887

The first officers and clubs elected to represent the newly formed Lancashire County Football Club were:

- PRESIDENT : James MacLaren, Esq. (Manchester).
- VICE-PRESIDENTS : W. Brierley, Esq. (Manchester); E. Kewley, Esq. (Liverpool).
- HON. SECRETARY AND TREASURER : W. Grave, Esq. (Manchester).
- COMMITTEE : Manchester, Liverpool, Broughton, Cheetham, Preston, Manchester Rangers, Rochdale Hornets, Oldham, Swinton, and Free Wanderers.

The first match was versus the Midland Counties (the Lanarkshire match having been cancelled), played at Coventry on 26 March 1882. Albert Neilson Hornby became president after James MacLaren resigned the office on 1 October 1884. Lancashire was part of the Queen's Jubilee celebrations in 1887 when they were asked to play Middlesex at Kennington Oval on 12 March as a representation of Rugby Football, whilst Corinthians played Preston North End as an exposition of Association rules. Lancashire, led by Edward Temple Gurdon, won by a try, gained by Vincent Slater (Salford).

In February 1889 it was proposed that the county shall be divided out into five districts (Manchester, Liverpool, South-East Lancashire, West Lancashire, and North Lancashire) each with three representatives, removing club based representation on the committee.

=== 1890–1900 ===
The rose (as depicted in a match program of 1947), emblem of the Union

Lancashire won the 1890-91 season of the County Championship, despite the county championship having been organised by arch-rivals, Yorkshire. Lancashire won all their games with "not a goal being scored against them in any of the county matches they played". They then played "the Rest of England", on 18 April 1891. In 1891-92 Lancashire were defeated by Yorkshire who therefore wrested the championship of England from Lancashire.

At this time, Lancashire County Football Club was made up of a number of clubs, and two sub-unions, West Lancashire Union (formed in 1884) and South-East Lancashire Union (predating the county Rugby Union having been formed in 1877):

- Aspull
- Askam
- Barrow-in- Furness
- Blackley Rangers
- Blackley
- Boothstown
- Broughton
- Broughton Rangers
- Bury
- Broughton Park
- Crompton
- Eccles
- Failsworth
- Free Wanderers
- Leigh
- Liverpool
- Liverpool Old Boys
- Lancaster
- Manchester
- Manchester Rangers
- Morecambe
- Mossley
- Oldham
- Owens College
- Pendleton
- Radcliffe
- Rochdale Hornets
- Rochdale St. Clements
- Salford
- Stalybridge
- St. Helens
- St Helens Recs
- South-East Lancashire and Border Towns
- Southport
- Swinton
- Tottington
- Tuebrook
- Tyldesley
- Ulverston
- Walkden
- Warrington
- Werneth
- West Lancashire
- Widnes
- Wigan
- Waterloo

It was postulated that the comparatively small membership compared to Yorkshire had its roots in the fact that Yorkshire had a Challenge Cup, the eligibility for which was based on membership of the county union, whereas in Lancashire there was no equivalent.

== Affiliated clubs ==
There are currently 83 clubs affiliated with the Lancashire RFU, most of which have teams at both senior and junior level. The majority of teams are based in Lancashire, parts of Greater Manchester and Merseyside, but there are also occasionally sides from Cheshire and even Cumbria that are members.

- Aldwinians
- Anti-Assassins
- Ashton-under-Lyne
- Aspull
- Bay Horse
- Birchfield
- Blackburn
- Blackpool
- Bolton
- Broughton
- Broughton Park
- Burnage
- Burnley
- Bury
- Carnforth
- Chorley
- Clitheroe
- Colne & Nelson
- Crosby St Marys
- De la Salle
- Didsbury Toc H
- Eagle (Note: Eagle are based in Cheshire but belong to the Lancashire RFU.)
- East City Saints
- Eccles
- Edge Hill University
- England Fire Service
- Firwood Waterloo
- Fleetwood
- Fylde
- Garstang
- Greater Manchester Fire Brigade
- Greater Manchester Police
- Heaton Moor
- HM Prison Hindley
- Lancashire Constabulary
- Lancashire Ladies
- Lancaster University
- Leigh
- Leyland Warriors
- Littleborough
- Liverpool Collegiate
- Liverpool John Moores University
- Liverpool Medical School
- Lostock
- Manchester
- Manchester Medicals
- Manchester Metropolitan University
- Manchester YMCA
- Mancunians
- Merseyside Police
- Mossley Hill
- Myerscough College
- Newton Le Willows
- North Manchester
- Old Bedians
- Old Boltonians
- Oldham
- Ormskirk
- Orrell
- Orrell St James
- Preston Grasshoppers
- Rochdale
- Rossendale
- Ruskin Park
- St Edwards Old Boys
- Sedgley Park
- Sefton
- Southport
- Tarleton
- Thornton Cleveleys
- Trafford MV
- Tyldesley
- University of Bolton
- University of Central Lancashire
- University of Cumbria (Note: The University of Cumbria is based in Cumbria but has campuses in Lancaster and belongs to the Lancashire RFU.)
- University of Manchester
- University of Salford
- Vale of Lune
- Warrington
- West Park St Helens
- Widnes (Note: Widnes are based in Cheshire but belong to the Lancashire RFU.)
- Wigan
- Wythenshawe

== County club competitions ==
The Lancashire RFU currently helps run the following competitions for club sides based in Lancashire:

=== Leagues ===
All leagues are by both the Lancashire RFU and Cheshire RFU and feature clubs based in Cheshire, Merseyside, Lancashire, Greater Manchester and the Isle of Man.

- Lancs/Cheshire 1 - league ranked at tier 7 of the English rugby union system
- South Lancs/Cheshire 1 - tier 7 league
- South Lancs/Cheshire 2 - tier 8 league
- Lancs/Cheshire Division 3 - tier 9 league

In 2018 several Lancashire Clubs lobbied the County to form a county based league system after repeated requests to change the RFU League structure in the North West had failed. The start of the 2018/19 season saw the founding of two Leagues in the ADM Lancashire County Leagues consisting of ten teams each. In the 2019/20 this was expanded to two 12 team leagues and by the 2020-21 season it had expanded to three senior 1st XV leagues consisting of three leagues and 35 clubs. In addition, two new "combination" leagues where formed consisting of two 10 team leagues.

ADM Premier Division ADM Championship Division ADM 1st Division

Combination 1 Combination 2

=== Cups ===
- John Burgess Lancashire Cup
- Brian Leigh Lancashire Trophy
- Lancashire Plate
- Alan Stone Lancashire Bowl

=== Discontinued competitions ===
- North Lancashire/Cumbria - tier 7 league for Lancashire and Cumbria based clubs that was abolished in 2018
- North Lancashire 2 - tier 9 league for Lancashire clubs that was abolished in 2015
- Lancashire (North) - tier 8 league for Lancashire clubs that was abolished in 2017
- North West 1 - tier 7 league for Lancashire, Cheshire and Cumbria clubs that was abolished in 2000
- North West 2 - tier 8 league for Lancashire, Cheshire and Cumbria clubs that was abolished in 2000
- North West 3 - tier 9 league for Lancashire, Cheshire and Cumbria clubs that was abolished in 2000
- North-West East 3 - tier 12 league for Lancashire clubs that was abolished in 1992

== County side ==
=== Honours ===
Team kit

The county side has reached the County Championship Final 38 times, winning the title on a record 25 occasions. Lancashire have played in twelve of the past fourteen finals (from 2003 to 2018) and has won nine of those twelve finals.

- County Championship winners (25): 1891, 1935, 1938, 1947, 1948, 1949, 1955, 1969, 1973, 1977, 1980, 1982, 1988, 1990, 1992, 1993, 2003, 2006, 2009, 2010, 2011, 2013, 2014, 2017, 2018

=== Notable players ===
- Gerry Ainscough
- Jack Anderton
- Tom Banks
- Bill Beaumont
- Edmund Beswick
- Steve Borthwick
- Walter Bumby
- William Burgess
- Fran Cotton
- Harry Eagles
- Dick Greenwood
- Edward Temple Gurdon
- Albert Neilson Hornby
- Barry Jackson, Captain of Lancashire and England International.
- Thomas Kelly (also played for Devon Rugby Football Union)
- Edward Kewley
- Andi Kyriacou
- Mike Leadbetter
- Arthur Lees
- Joe Mills
- Tony Neary
- Rob O'Donnell
- William Openshaw
- Malcolm Phillips
- Hugh Rowley
- Alex Sanderson
- Pat Sanderson
- Robert Seddon
- Lancelot Slocock
- Warren Spragg
- Charles Thompson
- James Valentine
- Thomas Sherren Whittaker
- Peter Williams
- Sam Williams
- Ryan De La Harpe
- Sammy Southern
- Martin Hynes
- Duncan Sandford
- James Holt Marsh

== Presidents ==
- 1881/84 J McLaren ★ (Manchester)
- 1884/14 A. N. Hornby (Manchester)
- 1919/23 A M Crook ★ (Broughton Park)
- 1923/24 H Williamson (Kersal)
- 1924/26 A Brettagh (Liverpool)
- 1926/28 T W S Pollok (Waterloo)
- 1928/30 H S Johnson (Heaton Moor)
- 1930/32 J E Kidd (Broughton Park)
- 1932/34 J Milnes ★ (Manchester)
- 1934/36 T J Bradburn (Manchester)
- 1936/37 Dr E Moir (Manchester University)
- 1937/39 T Brakell (Waterloo)
- 1939/47 J Hunter (Manchester)
- 1947/49 J Bradley (Warrington)
- 1949/51 H G Preston (Waterloo)
- 1951/53 J H Roberts (Prestwich)
- 1953/55 J B G Whittaker (Manchester)
- 1955/56 J R Locker ★ (Warrington)
- 1956/57 E Ogden (Fylde)
- 1957/58 S C Meikle (Waterloo)
- 1958/59 H A Fry (Liverpool)
- 1959/60 C B Sewell (Prestwich)
- 1960/61 N Shaw (Eccles)
- 1961/62 J Heaton (Waterloo)
- 1962/63 R S Unsworth (Manchester)
- 1963/64 V G Funduklian (Broughton Park)
- 1964/65 R H Guest (Waterloo)
- 1965/66 E Randell (Furness)
- 1966/67 A Marsden (Preston Grasshoppers)
- 1967/68 L Mortlock (Prestwich)
- 1968/69 P G Clemence (Manchester)
- 1969/70 W E Naylor (St. Helens)
- 1970/71 A Shuker (Broughton Park)
- 1971/72 R G Burton (Manchester)
- 1972/73 C C C Burch (Warrington)
- 1973/74 W R Hall (Heaton Moor)
- 1974/75 R Higgins (Liverpool)
- 1975/76 E Evans (Old Aldwinians)
- 1976/77 G A Macintosh (Waterloo)
- 1977/78 J H Waters (Kersal)
- 1978/79 J Benson (Orrell)
- 1979/80 J Walsh (Heaton Moor)
- 1980/81 A Gott (Burnage)
- 1981/82 J Burgess ★ (Broughton Park)
- 1982/83 R H Wiseman (Preston Grasshoppers)
- 1983/84 F Hardman (Sedgley Park)
- 1984/85 M S Phillips ★ (Fylde)
- 1985/86 W G Bevan (Broughton Park)
- 1986/87 Dr J E Ryner (Broughton Park)
- 1987/88 I Sinclair (Heaton Moor)
- 1988/89 W S B Faulds (Anti-Assassins/Bury)
- 1989/90 K Jones (Manchester)
- 1990/91 Dr N H Atkinson (Heaton Moor)
- 1991/92 E Deasey (Rochdale)
- 1992/93 B H England (Warrington)
- 1993/94 R B Bretherton (Southport)
- 1994/95 K Brown (Liverpool)
- 1995/96 H E Neeley (Sedgley Park)
- 1996/97 P E Hughes (Calder Vale)
- 1997/98 W A Kershaw (Manchester)
- 1998/99 B Leigh (Wigan)
- 1999/00 R T J Briers (West Park)
- 2000/01 T W Alexander (Tyldesley)
- 2001/02 W G D Chappell (Bury)
- 2002/03 E M Whiteside (Southport)
- 2003/04 F Morgan (Wigan)
- 2004/05 J W Dewhurst (Fleetwood)
- 2005/06 M Cornelia (Warrington)
- 2006/07 S M Parker (Manchester)
- 2007/08 D N Herriman (Widnes)
- 2008/09 K Andrews (West Park)
- 2009/10 C Barker (Wigan)
- 2010/11 D Welsh (Fleetwood)
- 2011/12 T Hughes (Leigh)
- 2012/13 M Worsley (West Park)
- 2013/14 D Hodgson (Blackburn/Vale of Lune)
- 2014/15 D Matthews (Liverpool St. Helens)
- 2015/16 T Stirk (Fylde / Schools Union)
- 2016/17 T Fitzgerald (Preston Grasshoppers)
- 2017/18 S Blackburn (Rochdale)
- 2018/19 D Clarke (Wigan)
- 2019/20 G Burns - MBE (Waterloo)
- 2022/23 Brian Stott (North Manchester)
- 2023/24 Carol Baker (Leigh)
- 2024/25 Brian Hurst (Littleborough)
- 2025/26 Ian Spivey (Aldwinians)
- 2026/27 Robbie Jones (Schools Union)

Notes: ★ RFU President

== See also ==
- Northern Division
- English rugby union system
