= Bowdon RUFC =

English rugby union club, based in Timperley, Greater Manchester

Bowdon
- Full name: Bowdon RUFC
- Union: Cheshire RFU
- Founded: 1877; 149 years ago
- Location: Timperley, Greater Manchester, England
- Ground: Clay Lane
- League: Regional 2 North West
- 2024–25: 1st (promoted to Regional 1 North West)

Official website
- bowdonrufc.rfu.club

Bowdon Rugby Union Football Club is a rugby union club based in Timperley in Greater Manchester. The first XV currently plays in Regional 1 North West, playing at level 5 for the first time in their history, two seasons after missing out on promotion by five points.

== Honours ==
- Regional 2 North West champions: 2024–25
- Cheshire RFU Bowl winners: 2013–14
