= Bolton RUFC =

English rugby union club, based in Bolton, Greater Manchester

(England) Bolton R.U.F.C
- Full name: Bolton Rugby Union Football Club
- Union: Lancashire RFU
- Founded: 1872; 154 years ago
- Location: Bolton, Greater Manchester England
- Ground: Avenue Street
- Chairman: Mark Brocklehurst
- Coach: David Crouch
- Captain: Les Towler
- League: North 2 West
- 2019–20: 12th
Team kit

Official website
- www.boltonrugby.co.uk

Bolton RUFC are an amateur rugby union team, based in Bolton, who play in the North 2 West league of the English rugby union league system.

== History ==
Bolton RUFC was first formed in 1872 and was first listed in the Football Annual of 1874.

It reads: "Bolton formed 1872, has 100 members, ground at Burnden which is 1 mile from Bolton station. The dressing rooms are on the ground and it plays Rugby Football. The Secretary or Manager is F H Kevan of 12 Acresfield, Bolton. The colours are Blue jerseys, socks and cap, white knickerbockers. Result of matches last season :- Won 3, Lost 3, Drew 1. Result of goals Won 5, Lost 7."

Between 1919 and 1939, Bolton had a club that boasted International players, and even the former Bolton MP Arthur Holt played for them, but World War II finally saw the demise of the game in Bolton. The start of the modern era was due to several former pupils of Hayward School, who formed a team to play on Saturdays calling themselves the 'Old Haywardians'.

Hayward School colours were used as the basis of the maroon and white hooped shirts, and the start of a second team brought the need for the more normal club type structure, with fund raising, and social activities. A brief look at the Accounts of 1969 indicated that the club had £36 and 19 shillings in the Bank.

In 1971 the club moved to a base at Bolton Wyresdale sports club, close to their council rented pitches at New House Farm. Here the club began to flourish, with up to 4 teams being put out, and good results, against a steadily improving fixture list.

By the early 1980s, with the help of Bolton Council a new ground site at Avenue Street was coming into consideration. Slowly the various elements came together and building started on 5 May 1988. Saturday 3 September 1988 saw the first competitive game played at the new purpose-built facilities versus Greater Manchester Fire Service. The new club house was officially opened on Sunday 4 September 1988, with a second game versus a president's invitational XV.

Today, Bolton RUFC operate 3 senior men's teams, a large junior/mini section and support a number of local initiatives.

== Club Honours ==
- North-West East 2 champions: 1987–88
- North Lancashire 1 champions: 1999–00
- Cumbria v North Lancashire 1 promotion playoff winners: 2012–13
- North Lancashire/Cumbria v South Lancs/Cheshire 1 promotion playoff winners: 2013–14

== Playing Leagues ==
First Team - RFU Lancs/Cheshire Division 1

Second Team - North West Leagues, Sale Sharks Division 1

Third Team - North West Leagues, Sale Sharks Division 4 North

== 2018–2019 Results ==
First XV

- 4th place, finishing behind Glossop, Bowdon and Altrincham Kersal who finished in 3rd, 2nd and 1st place respectively

Second XV

- 2nd place (finishing behind Colne & Nelson) earning league promotion from Halbro Northwest County Courier Services Division 2 North to Sale Sharks Division 1

Third XV

- 11th place

== Previous Year Results ==
2013–2014 Results

First XV:

- 2nd place earning promotion defeating Northwich RUFC 21–18 in a play off game
- Lancashire Plate Cup Winners beating the University of Liverpool 25-20

Second XV:

- 2nd place earning league promotion
- Runners up in cup final losing 13–10 to Stockport R.U.F.C

Third XV - 5th Place

Fourth XV - 5th Place

2012–2013 Results

First XV - 2nd place, earning promotion following a play-off game against Cumbrian side Silloth Tigers.

Second XV - 3rd place

Third XV - 7th place

Fourth XV - 4th place and cup runners up

== Playing Strip ==
According to local records, Bolton Rugby Club first played in 'blue jerseys, socks and cap, white knickerbockers'. From the 1960s, Bolton have played in red and white hooped shirts, black shorts and variants of red/black/white hooped or plain red socks. Bolton's away colours are black and white hoops.

== Rugby League ==
In 2011 Bolton RUFC experimented by venturing into the world of summer Rugby League during the Rugby Union off season. Bolton entered a mixed senior squad in the North West Merit League operated by the North West Rugby League www.northwestrl.co.uk.

Although not directly affiliated, for the last few years Bolton Mets RFLC have used Avenue Street as their base and continue to do so in 2019.
