= Rochdale RUFC =

English rugby union club, based in Rochdale, Greater Manchester

- Full name: Rochdale Rugby Union Football Club
- Union: Lancashire RFU
- Founded: 1921; 105 years ago
- Location: Rochdale, Greater Manchester, England
- Ground(s): Moorgate Avenue, off Bury Road, Rochdale, Lancashire, OL11 5LU
- President: David Hodgkinson
- Most caps: Daniel Kelly (England) {1}
- League: Regional 2 North East
- 2024–25: 1st (promoted to Regional 1 North East

Official website
- www.rrufc.org/site/

Rochdale Rugby Football Club is an English rugby union, non-professional team and RFU accredited club based in Rochdale, Greater Manchester. The first XV currently play in Regional 1 North East, a level 5 league in the English league system, following the club's promotion from Regional 2 North East at the end of the 2024–25 season. The first XV are the most successful club in the Lancashire Trophy competition, winning the competition five times.

The club has just under six hundred register players across senior and all age grades. Each weekend the club field three senior male sides, a ladies XV, mini & junior teams from under-6's through to senior colts along with three girls teams (U13, U15 & U18s). In the 2018–19 season the club formed its first adult age ladies team. The 'Expendables' (over-35's) play invitational games during the season.

Daniel Kelly, currently with Munster and formerly a Rochdale RUFC junior player, was selected for his first cap against Canada at Twickenham and made his international debut for England on 10 July 2021.

== Honours ==
- North West 3 champions: 1999–00
- North Lancs/Cumbria champions: 2001–02
- South Lancs/Cheshire 1 champions: 2004–05
- North Division 2 West champions: 2008–09
- Regional 2 North East champions: 2024–25
