= Lancashire (North) =

Defunct rugby union league in England

- Current season or competition: 2016–17 Lancashire (North)
- Sport: Rugby union
- Instituted: 1987; 39 years ago
- Ceased: 2017; 9 years ago
- Number of teams: 12
- Country: England
- Holders: Tarleton (2nd title) (2016–17) (promoted to North Lancashire/Cumbria)
- Most titles: De La Salle (Salford) (7 titles)
- Website: England RFU

Lancashire (North), formerly known as North Lancashire 1 was a regional (tier 8) English Rugby Union league for teams from the South Lancashire and Manchester area. The league champions were promoted to North Lancashire/Cumbria while the runners had a playoff against the runners up from the Cumbria League for the final promotion spot.

The division was initially known as North-West East 1 when it was created in 1987, and had a number of different names since with North Lancashire 1 being the longest running. The most recent version known as Lancashire (North) was set up for the 2015-16 season when the RFU decided to break up the South Lancs/Cheshire league into 3 different zones also included Merseyside (West) and Cheshire (South). The format was not a success and South Lancs/Cheshire was resurrected for the 2016-17 with only Lancashire (North) remaining albeit with 12 teams instead of 14. When it was known as Lancashire Division 1 teams were relegated to North Lancashire 2.

After reinstating the league for one more season, at the end of 2016-17 the RFU again decided to cancel the league. Teams were instead transferred to the new Lancs/Cheshire 3 (North) division - which was created from breaking South Lancs/Cheshire 3 into two regional leagues.

== Participating Clubs 2016-17 ==
- Ashton-under-Lyne (relegated from North Lancashire/Cumbria)
- Burnley
- Bury
- Colne & Nelson
- Didsbury Toc H
- Garstang
- North Manchester
- Pendle
- Ormskirk
- Orrell
- Tarleton
- Thornton Cleveleys

== Participating Clubs 2015-16 ==
Locations of the 2015-16 Lancashire (North) teams in Lancashire
Locations of the 2015-16 Lancashire (North) teams in Greater Manchester

Team	Ground	Capacity	City/Area	Previous season
Burnley	Holden Road		Reedley Hallows, Burnley, Lancashire	Transferred from North Lancashire 1 (8th)
Bury	Bury Sports Club		Bury, Greater Manchester	Transferred from North Lancashire 2 (3rd)
Colne & Nelson	Holt House		Colne, Lancashire	Transferred from North Lancashire 2 (6th)
Didsbury Toc H	Ford Lane		Didsbury, Manchester	Transferred from North Lancashire 1 (4th)
Garstang	Hudson Park		Garstang, Lancashire	Transferred from North Lancashire 1 (6th)
Hutton	Saunders' Lane		Hutton, Lancashire	Transferred from North Lancashire 2 (4th)
Littleborough	Rakewood Road		Littleborough, Greater Manchester	Transferred from North Lancashire 1 (3rd)
North Manchester	Tudor Lodge		Moston, Manchester	Transferred from North Lancashire 1 (10th)
Ormskirk	Green Lane		Ormskirk, Lancashire	Transferred from South Lancs/Cheshire 2 (7th)
Orrell	St John Rigby College		Orrell, Wigan, Greater Manchester	Transferred from South Lancs/Cheshire 2 (6th)
Pendle	Swinden Playing Fields		Nelson, Lancashire	Transferred from North Lancashire 2 (1st)
Tarleton	Carr Lane		Tarleton, Lancashire	Transferred from North Lancashire/Cumbria (13th)
Thornton-Cleveleys	Thornton Sports Centre		Thornton, Lancashire	Transferred from North Lancashire 1 (7th)
Trafford MV	MacPherson Park		Trafford, Greater Manchester	Transferred from North Lancashire 1 (5th)

== Participating Clubs 2014-15 ==
- Ashton-Under-Lyne
- Birchfield (promoted from North Lancashire 2)
- Burnley
- Didsbury TOC H
- Garstang
- Littleborough (relegated from North Lancashire/Cumbria)
- North Manchester (promoted from North Lancashire 2)
- Oldham
- St Edward's O.B.
- Thornton Cleveleys
- Trafford MV

== Participating Clubs 2013-14 ==
- Ashton-Under-Lyne (promoted from North Lancashire 2)
- Burnley
- De La Salle (Salford)
- Didsbury Toc H (relegated from North Lancashire/Cumbria)
- Garstang
- Heaton Moor (relegated from North Lancashire/Cumbria)
- Hutton
- Mossley Hill
- Oldham
- St Edward's Old Boys
- Thornton Cleveleys (promoted from North Lancashire 2)
- Trafford MV

== Participating Clubs 2012-13 ==
- Bolton
- Burnley
- Bury
- De La Salle (Salford)
- Garstang
- Hutton
- Mossley Hill
- North Manchester
- Oldham
- St Edward's Old Boys
- Tarleton
- Trafford MV

== Original teams ==
When league rugby began in 1987 this division contained the following teams:

- Ashton-on-Mersey
- Ashton-under-Lyne
- Bowden
- Congleton
- De La Salle (Salford)
- Kersal (Note: Kersal are now known as Altrincham Kersal.)
- Metrovick (Note: Metrovick would be renamed as Trafford MV RFCC in 1993.)
- North Manchester
- Old Bedians
- Old Salians
- Tyldesley
- Vickers

== Lancashire (North) honours ==
=== North-West East 1 (1987–1992) ===
The original incarnation of North Lancashire 1 was known as North-West East 1, and was a tier 10 league with promotion up to North-West East/North 1 and relegation down to North-West East 2.

North-West East 1 Honours
Season	No of Teams	Champions	Runners–up	Relegated Teams
1987–88	11	De La Salle (Salford)	Metrovick	Bowden, North Manchester, Ashton-under-Lyne
1988–89	11	Ashton-on-Mersey	Old Salians	Congleton, Calder Vale, Bolton
1989–90	11	Old Salians	Kersal	Colne & Nelson, Toc H
1990–91	10	Crewe & Nantwich	Kersal	Ashton-under-Lyne, Heaton Moor
1991–92	11	Altrincham Kersal (Note: Champions Alterincham Kersal would be promoted and subsequently transferred to Lancs/Cheshire 1 (formerly North-West West 1) instead of Cumbria/Lancs North (formerly North-West East/North 1).))	Metrovick (Note: Calder Vale and Tyldesley would also be promoted.)	No relegation (Note: Reorganisation of the North-West leagues for the following season, which included the cancellation of North-West East 3, meant that was no relegation.)
Green backgrounds are promotion places.

=== Lancashire North 1 (1992–1996) ===
North-West East 1 was renamed as Lancashire North 1 for the start of the 1992–93 season with promotion to Cumbria/Lancs North (formerly North-West East/North 1) and relegation to Lancashire North 2 (formerly North-West East 2). Initially a tier 10 league, the creation of National 5 North for the 1993–94 season meant that Lancashire North 1 dropped to become a tier 11 league.

Lancashire North 1 Honours
Season	No of Teams	Champions	Runners–up	Relegated Teams
1992–93	14	Fleetwood	Burnage	Heaton Moor, Littleborough, Marple, Ashton-under-Lyne (Note: In order to boost the low number of teams in Lancashire North 2 (which only had 5 teams) four teams would be relegated from Lancashire North 1.)
1993–94	13	De La Salle (Salford)	Bolton	Clitheroe, Broughton, Old Bedians
1994–95	13	Trafford MV	Oldham	Burnage, Chorley
1995–96	13	Ashton-under-Lyne	Blackpool	North Manchester, Eccles, Oldham
Green backgrounds are promotion places.

=== North Lancashire 1 (1996–2000) ===
The league system was restructured from top to bottom by the Rugby Football Union for the start of the 1996–97 season. Lancashire North 1 was renamed as North Lancashire 1, and the cancellation of National 5 North and creation of North West 3 meant that it remained a tier 11 league. Promotion was to North Lancs/Cumbria (formerly Cumbria/Lancs North) while relegation was to North Lancashire 2 (formerly Lancashire North 2).

North Lancashire 1 Honours
Season	No of Teams	Champions	Runners–up	Relegated Teams
1996–97	10	Blackpool	Broughton	Colne & Nelson
1997–98	10	Oldham	Bury	Littleborough
1998–99	10	De La Salle (Salford)	Bury	Chorley
1999–00	10	Bolton (Note: Bolton were not promoted due to Northern League restructuring.)	Eccles	Thornton Cleveleys, Colne & Nelson
Green backgrounds are promotion places.

=== North Lancashire 1 (2000–2015) ===
Northern league restructuring by the RFU at the end of the 1999–00 season saw the cancellation of North West 1, North West 2 and North West 3 (tiers 7-9). This meant that North Lancashire 1 became a tier 8 league, with promotion continuing to North Lancs/Cumbria and relegation to North Lancashire 2.

North Lancashire 1 Honours
Season	No of Teams	Champions	Runners–up	Relegated Teams
2000–01	12	De La Salle (Salford)	Tyldesley	Broughton, Ashton-Under-Lyne
2001–02	12	Fleetwood	Bury	Burnley
2002–03	12	Trafford MV	Didsbury Toc H	Fylde Saracens, Old Bedians, Thornton Cleveleys
2003–04	12	De La Salle (Salford)	Didsbury Toc H	West Park Warriors, Chorley
2004–05	12	Heaton Moor	Burnage	Ashton-Under-Lyne, Blackpool
2005–06	11	Aldwinians	Didsbury Toc H	Thornton Cleveleys
2006–07	12	Kirkby Lonsdale	Tarleton	Colne & Nelson, Bury
2007–08	12	Heaton Moor	Burnley	Blackpool, Windermere, Garstang
2008–09	12	Furness	Eccles	No relegation (Note: No relegation as division due to increase from 12 to 14 teams for the following season.)
2009–10	14	De La Salle (Salford)	Didsbury Toc H	Old Bedians, Windermere
2010–11	14	Aldwinians	Trafford MV	Newton-le-Willows, Ashton-Under-Lyne
2011–12	14	Littleborough	Trafford MV	Birchfield, Windermere
2012–13	14	Tarleton	Bolton	Bury, North Manchester
2013–14	14	De La Salle (Salford)	Heaton Moor	Hutton, Mossley Hill
2014–15	11	Oldham	Ashton-Under-Lyne	St Edward's Old Boys, North Manchester
Green backgrounds are promotion places.

=== Lancashire (North) (2015–2017) ===
North Lancashire 1 was renamed as Lancashire (North) at the start of the 2015–16 as part of North-West league restructuring by the RFU who decided to break up the North Lancashire and South Lancs/Cheshire leagues into 3 different zones - Cheshire (South), Lancashire (North) and Merseyside (West). Promotion would continue into North Lancashire/Cumbria but the cancellation of North Lancashire 2 meant there would be no relegation. After two seasons Lancashire (North) would be discontinued and all teams transferred into Lancs/Cheshire 3.

Lancashire (North) Honours
Season	No of Teams	Champions	Runners–up	Relegated Teams
2015–16	14	Trafford MV	Littleborough	No relegation
2016–17	11	Tarleton	Burnley	No relegation
Green backgrounds are promotion places.

== Promotion play-offs ==
Since the 2000–01 season there was a play-off between the runners-up of the Cumbria League and Lancashire (North) for the third and final promotion place to North Lancashire/Cumbria. The team with the superior league record had home advantage in the tie. At the end of the 2016–17 season the Lancashire (North) teams have been the most successful with eleven wins to the Cumbria League teams four; and the home team has won promotion on twelve occasions compared to the away teams three.

Cumbria League v Lancashire (North) promotion play-off results
Season	Home team	Score	Away team	Venue	Attendance
2000–01	Tyldesley (L)	47-26	Hawcoat Park (C) (Note: Despite finishing at the top of the 2000-01 Cumbrian League according to the RFU website, Hawcoat Park actually went into the playoff rather than runners up St Benedicts. Reasons for this are not clear, although St Benedicts did play one less game than Hawcoat Park and were level on points but with a weaker for/against record, so maybe an average points total was used to determine the champions.)	St George's Park, Tyldesley, Manchester	
2001–02	Bury (L)	20-3	Windermere (C)	Bury Sports Club, Bury, Greater Manchester	
2002–03	Didsbury Toc H (L)	17-29	Upper Eden (C) (Note: Despite finished third in the 2002-03 Cumbrian League, Upper Eden went into the promotion playoff as champions Netherall were not promoted, with second placed Windermere going up instead.)	Ford Lane, Didsbury, Manchester	
2003–04	Egremont (C) (Note: Despite winning the 2003-04 Cumbrian League, Egremont had to take part in the promotion playoff usually reserved for league runners up.)	27-19	Didsbury Toc H (L)	Bleach Green, Egremont, Cumbria	
2004–05	Burnage (L)	60-0	Moresby (C)	Varley Park, Stockport, Greater Manchester	
2005–06	Kirkby Lonsdale (C)	20-23	Didsbury Toc H (L)	Raygarth, Kirkby Lonsdale, Cumbria	
2006–07	Tarleton (L)	28-7	Keswick (C)	Carr Lane, Tarleton, Lancashire	
2007–08	Netherhall (C)	0-20	Burnley (L)	Netherhall Road, Maryport, Cumbria	
2008–09	No promotion playoff (Note: Due to changes to English rugby union league system by the RFU there would be no promotion playoff at the end of 2008-09 season. Instead the champions and runners up from both leagues would be automatically promoted.)				
2009–10	Didsbury Toc H (L)	42-10	Millom (C) (Note: Despite finishing the 2009-10 Cumbrian League in third place, Millom went into the promotion playoff game instead of runners up Egremont. Millom had actually played two less games and were only two points off the runner up spot so this may explain why they qualified for the playoff.)	Ford Lane, Didsbury, Manchester	
2010–11	Egremont (C)	19-18	Trafford MV (L)	Bleach Green, Egremont, Cumbria	
2011–12	Whitehaven (C)	33-22	Trafford MV (L)	The Playground, Whitehaven, Cumbria	
2012–13	Bolton (L)	27-7	Silloth (C)	Avenue Street, Bolton, Greater Manchester	
2013–14	No promotion playoff (Note: Due to restructuring of the north-west leagues by the RFU there would be no promotion playoff at the end of 2013-14 season. Instead the champions and runners up from both leagues would be automatically promoted.)				
2014–15	Ashton-under-Lyne (L)	17-5	Workington (C)	Gambrel Bank, Ashton-under-Lyne, Greater Manchester	
2015–16	Littleborough (L)	37-3	Egremont (C)	Rakewood Road, Littleborough, Rochdale, Greater Manchester	
2016–17	Burnley (L)	94-0	Whitehaven (C)	Holden Road, Burnley, Lancashire	
Green background is the promoted team. C = Cumbria League and L = Lancashire (North) (formerly North Lancashire 1)

== Number of league titles ==
- De La Salle (Salford) (7)
- Trafford MV (3)
- Aldwinians (2)
- Fleetwood (2)
- Heaton Moor (2)
- Oldham (2)
- Tarleton (2)
- Altrincham Kersal (1)
- Ashton-on-Mersey (1)
- Ashton-under-Lyne (1)
- Blackpool (1)
- Bolton (1)
- Crewe & Nantwich (1)
- Furness (1)
- Kirkby Lonsdale (1)
- Littleborough (1)
- Old Salians (1)

== See also ==
- North Lancashire 2
- Lancashire RFU
- Cheshire (South)
- Merseyside (West)
- English rugby union system
- Rugby union in England
