= North-West East 3 =

English Rugby Union league

- Sport: Rugby Union
- Instituted: 1989; 37 years ago
- Ceased: 1992; 34 years ago
- Country: England

North-West East 3 was an English Rugby Union league which was at the twelve tier of the domestic competition and was available to teams in Greater Manchester and Lancashire. Promoted teams moved up to North-West East 2 and, as it was the lowest ranked league in the region, there was no relegation.

North-West East 3 ran for three seasons from 1987 to 1992 until it was cancelled by the RFU as part of their north-west league restructuring. All teams were promoted into Lancashire North 2 for the 1992–93 season.

== Original teams ==
When the division was introduced in 1989 it contained the following teams:

- Atherton - N/A (new to league)
- Bowden - relegated from North-West East 2 (12th)
- Holmes Chapel - N/A (new to league)
- Lostock - N/A (new to league)
- Oldham College (Note: Oldham College would merge with and become part of North Manchester Rugby Club in 1991.) - relegated from North-West East 2 (11th)
- Shell Carrington (Note: Shell Carrington are now known as Carrington RUFC.) - transferred from North-West West 3 (11th)
- Wigan Tech - transferred from North-West West 3 (8th)

== North-West East 3 honours ==
North-West East 3 Honours
Season	No of Teams	Champions	Runners–up	Relegated Teams
1989–90	7	Wigan Tech	Lostock	No relegation
1990–91	10	Marple	Bowdon	No relegation
1991–92	11	Thornton-Cleveleys	Blackpool (Note: Restructuring of the north-west leagues at the end of the 1991–92 season meant that all clubs in the division would be promoted/transferred to tier 10 and 11 leagues.)	No relegation
Green backgrounds are promotion places.

== Number of league titles ==
- Marple (1)
- Thornton-Cleveleys (1)
- Wigan Tech (1)

== See also ==
- North Lancashire 1
- North Lancashire 2
- Lancashire RFU
- English Rugby Union Leagues
- English rugby union system
- Rugby union in England
