= South Lancs/Cheshire 4 =

English rugby union league

- Sport: Rugby Union
- Instituted: 1996; 30 years ago
- Ceased: 2009; 17 years ago
- Number of teams: 7
- Country: England
- Holders: West Park Warriors (1st title) (2008–09) (transferred to North Lancs 2)
- Most titles: Orrell Anvils, Prenton (2 titles)
- Website: clubs.rfu.com

South Lancs/Cheshire 4 was a regional English rugby union league at the ninth tier of national competition for teams from the South Lancashire, Cheshire and Manchester area. Teams were promoted to South Lancs/Cheshire 3 and generally there was no relegation - although there was up until 2002 when South Lancs/Cheshire 5 was still active. Despite retaining healthy numbers of teams South Lancs/Cheshire 4 was abolished by the end of the 2008-09 season with most teams moving automatically up into South Lancs/Cheshire 3.

== Original teams ==
When this league was introduced in 1996 it contained the following teams:

- Halton - relegated from Lancashire South (9th)
- Hightown - relegated from Lancashire South (10th)
- Holmes Chapel - relegated from Cheshire (9th)
- Moore - relegated from Cheshire (8th)
- Shell Stanlow (Note: Shell Stanlow are now known as Ellesmere Port RUFC.) - relegated from Cheshire (7th)

== South Lancs/Cheshire 4 honours ==
=== South Lancs/Cheshire 4 (1996-2000) ===
The original South Lancs/Cheshire 4 league was ranked at tier 13 of the league system. Promotion was to South Lancs/Cheshire 3 and, as it was the lowest level in the North-West region, there was no relegation until the creation of South Lancs/Cheshire 5 at the end of the 1999–00 season.

South Lancs/Cheshire 4
Season	No of Teams	Champions	Runners–up	Relegated Teams
1996–97	5	Shell Stanlow	Halton	No relegation
1997–98	7	Moore	Vulcan	No relegation
1998–99	6	Halton	Runcorn	No relegation
1999–00	7	Orrell Anvils (Note: Despite finishing as champions Orrell Anvils were not promoted due to the division increasing from 7 to 10 teams for the following season.)	Capenhurst	Lucas Merseyside, Mossley Hill (Note: Mossley Hill were also relegated despite finishing 4th.)
Green backgrounds are promotion places.

=== South Lancs/Cheshire 4 (2000-2009) ===
Northern league restructuring by the RFU at the end of the 1999-2000 season saw the cancellation of North West 1, North West 2 and North West 3 (tiers 7-9). This meant that South/Lancs Cheshire 4 became a tier 10 league. The creation of South Lancs/Cheshire 5 meant that there was briefly relegation into that division until it ceased at the end of the 2000–01 season. South Lancs/Cheshire 4 was itself cancelled at the end of the 2008–09 season with the majority of teams transferred into South Lancs/Cheshire 3.

South Lancs/Cheshire 4
Season	No of Teams	Champions	Runners–up	Relegated Teams
2000–01	10	Orrell Anvils	Bowdon	No relegation
2001–02	10	Prenton	Liverpool Collegiate	No relegation
2002–03	10	Manchester Wanderers	Halton	No relegation
2003–04	10	Sale FC	Oswestry	No relegation
2004-05	10	Mossley Hill	Oxton Parkonians	No relegation
2005–06	12	Prenton	Trentham	No relegation
2006–07	12	Eagle	Trentham	No relegation
2007–08	10	Marple	Knutsford	No relegation
2008–09	10	West Park Warriors (Note: Although champions due to the cancellation of South Lancs/Cheshire 4 at the end of the season, West Park Warriors instead transferred across to North Lancs 2.)	Linley (Note: Runners up Linley would go up into South Lancs/Cheshire 3 along with Oxton Parkonians, Ramsey, Capenhurst, Port Sunlight, Congleton and Helsby due to this being the last season of South Lancs/Cheshire 4. Crosby St. Mary's would transfer to North Lancs 2 along with champions West Park Warriors while Merseyside Police would drop out of the league altogether joining the North West Merit League Division 4 West.)	No relegation
Green backgrounds are promotion places.

== Number of league titles ==
- Orrell Anvils (2)
- Prenton (2)
- Eagle (1)
- Halton (1)
- Manchester Wanderers (1)
- Marple (1)
- Moore (1)
- Mossley Hill (1)
- Sale FC (1)
- Shell Stanlow (1)
- West Park Warriors (1)

== See also ==
- Cheshire RFU
- Lancashire RFU
- English rugby union system
- Rugby union in England

== See also ==
- English Rugby Union Leagues
- English rugby union system
- Rugby union in England
