= Lancs/Cheshire Division Three =

Defunct English rugby union league

South Lancs/Cheshire 3
- Current season or competition: 2018–19 South Lancs/Cheshire 3
- Sport: Rugby union
- Instituted: 1987; 39 years ago
- Ceased: 2019; 7 years ago
- Number of teams: 11
- Country: England
- Holders: Aspull (1st title) (2018–19) (Promoted to Lancs/Cheshire 2))
- Most titles: Ellesmere Port, Hoylake (2 titles)
- Website: England RFU

Lancs/Cheshire 3 (formerly South Lancs/Cheshire 3) was an English rugby union league. Promoted teams entered South Lancs/Cheshire 2, ranked at tier 9 of the English league system. This was the basement level for club rugby union for teams in the South Lancashire, Manchester and Cheshire areas and any team from this area wanting to begin in club rugby union had to join this league. Up until 2008–09 there was relegation with teams dropping down and coming up from South Lancs/Cheshire 4.

The division was initially known as North-West West 3 when it was created in 1987, and had a number of different names with South Lancs/Cheshire 3 being the longest running. The division had a break for the 2015-16 season as the RFU decided to restructure the South Lancs/Cheshire league into three zones - Merseyside (West), Cheshire (South) and Lancashire (North). This was short-lived and the division returned to its original format for the 2016–17 season - with only Lancashire (North) remaining of the three zones.

At the end of the 2016–17 season the RFU decided to break this division up into two regional leagues known as Lancs/Cheshire 3 (North) and Lancs/Cheshire 3 (South), with teams transferred into each league depending on geographical location. At the end of the 2018–19 season the division was cancelled.

== Teams 2018–19 ==
Team	Ground	Capacity	City/Area	Previous season
Ellesmere Port	Whitby Sports & Social Club		Ellesmere Port, Cheshire	3rd (league)
Liverpool University	Wyncote Sports Ground		Mossley Hill, Liverpool, Merseyside	6th (league cup)
Mossley Hill	Mossley Hill Athletic Club		Mossley Hill, Liverpool, Merseyside	8th (league)
Newton-le-Willows	Newton-le-Willows Sports Club		Newton-le-Willows, Merseyside	1st (league cup)
Old Bedians	Millgate Lane		Didsbury, Manchester, Greater Manchester	7th (league)
Oldershaw	Belvidere Recreational Ground		Oldershaw, Merseyside	Relegated from Lancs/Cheshire Division 2 (14th)
Oxton Parkonians	HM Curphey Memorial Ground		Oxton, Birkenhead, Merseyside	9th (league)
Prenton	Prenton Dell Road		Prenton, Birkenhead, Merseyside	2nd (league cup)
Ramsey	Mooragh Park		Ramsey, Isle of Man	4th (league)
Ruskin Park RUFC	Ruskin Drive Sports Ground		St Helens, Merseyside	N/A
Vagabonds	Port-E-Chee		Douglas, Isle of Man	Relegated from Lancs/Cheshire Division 2 (13th)

Locations of the 2018–19 Lancs/Cheshire 3 teams

== Teams 2017–18 ==
=== North ===
Team	Ground	Capacity	City/Area	Previous season
Ashton-under-Lyne	Gambrel Bank		Ashton-under-Lyne, Greater Manchester	Transferred from Lancashire (North) (11th)
Bury	Radcliffe Road		Bury, Greater Manchester	Transferred from Lancashire (North) (10th)
Clitheroe	Littlemoor Road		Clitheroe, Lancashire	Transferred from Raging Bull North West Leagues (2nd)
Eagle	Thornton Road		Great Sankey, Warrington, Cheshire	Transferred from South Lancs/Cheshire 2 (12th)
Garstang	Hudson Park		Garstang, Lancashire	Transferred from Lancashire (North) (6th)
North Manchester	Tudor Lodge		Moston, Manchester, Greater Manchester	Transferred from Lancashire (North) (9th)
Old Bedians	Millgate Lane		Didsbury, Manchester, Greater Manchester	Transferred from South Lancs/Cheshire 3 (3rd)
Ormskirk	Green Lane		Ormskirk, Lancashire	Transferred from Lancashire (North) (8th)

Locations of the 2017–18 Lancs/Cheshire 3 (North) teams

=== South ===
Team	Ground	Capacity	City/Area	Previous season
Birchfield	Birchfield Road		Widnes, Cheshire	Transferred from South Lancs/Cheshire 3 (9th)
Christleton	Christleton Sports Centre		Christleton, Chester, Cheshire	Transferred from South Lancs/Cheshire 3 (7th)
Ellesmere Port	Whitby Sports & Social Club		Ellesmere Port, Cheshire	Transferred from South Lancs/Cheshire 3 (6th)
Liverpool University	Wyncote Sports Ground		Mossley Hill, Liverpool, Merseyside	Transferred from South Lancs/Cheshire 3 (4th)
Mossley Hill	Mossley Hill Athletic Club		Mossley Hill, Liverpool, Merseyside	Transferred from South Lancs/Cheshire 3 (11th)
Newton-le-Willows	Newton-le-Willows Sports Club		Newton-le-Willows, Merseyside	Transferred from South Lancs/Cheshire 3 (10th)
Oxton Parkonians	HM Curphey Memorial Ground		Oxton, Birkenhead, Merseyside	Transferred from South Lancs/Cheshire 3 (8th)
Prenton	Prenton Dell Road		Prenton, Birkenhead, Merseyside	Transferred from South Lancs/Cheshire 3 (13th)
Ramsey	Mooragh Park		Ramsey, Isle of Man	Transferred from South Lancs/Cheshire 3 (5th)
Wallasey	Cross Lane		Wallasey, Merseyside	Transferred from South Lancs/Cheshire 3 (12th)

Locations of the 2017–18 Lancs/Cheshire 3 (South) teams in Merseyside & Isle of Man
Locations of the 2017–18 Lancs/Cheshire 3 (South) teams in Cheshire

== Participating clubs 2016-17 ==
- Aspull
- Birchfield
- Christleton
- Congleton
- Ellesmere Port
- Linley
- Liverpool University
- Mossley Hill
- Newton-le-Willows
- Old Bedians
- Oxton Parkonians
- Prenton
- Ramsey (IoM)
- Wallasey

== 2015-16 ==
For the 2015-16 season this league, and South Lancs/Cheshire 3, were replaced by three county-wide leagues - Cheshire (South), Merseyside (West) and Lancashire (North). However, with the exception of Lancashire North, the county leagues were axed after just one season and the South Lancs/Cheshire leagues were restored.

== Participating clubs 2014-15 ==
- Capenhurst
- Congleton
- Ellesmere Port
- Helsby
- Knutsford
- Linley
- Liverpool University
- Oldershaw
- Oxton Parkonians
- Ramsey (IoM) (relegated from South Lancs/Cheshire 2)
- Wallasey (relegated from South Lancs/Cheshire 2)

== Participating clubs 2013-14 ==
- Buxton (relegated from South Lancs/Cheshire 2)
- Capenhurst
- Congleton
- Ellesmere Port
- Helsby
- Holmes Chapel - withdrew after 3 games, 1st team now plays in NOWIRUL Leagues
- Knutsford
- Linley
- Liverpool University
- Oldershaw (relegated from South Lancs/Cheshire 2)
- Oxton Parkonians
- Prenton
- Trentham

== Participating clubs 2012-13 ==
- Capenhurst
- Congleton
- Ellesmere Port
- Helsby
- Holmes Chapel
- Knutsford
- Linley
- Liverpool University
- Manchester Medics
- Parkonians
- Port Sunlight
- Prenton
- Trentham

== Original teams ==
When league rugby began in 1987 this division contained the following teams:

- Agecroft
- Burtonwood
- Halton
- Helsby
- Hoylake
- Mossley Hill
- Old Rockferrians (Note: Old Rockferrians would merge with Old Instonians to form Prenton RUFC in 1992.)
- Prescot
- Shell Stanlow (Note: Shell Stanlow are now known as Ellesmere Port RUFC.)
- Wigan Tech

== Lancs/Cheshire 3 honours ==
=== North-West West 3 (1987–1992) ===
The original incarnation of South Lancs/Cheshire 3 was known as North-West West 3, and was a tier 11 league with promotion up to North-West West 2 and as the lowest ranked league in the region there was no relegation.

North-West West 3 Honours
Season	No of Teams	Champions	Runners–up	Relegated Teams
1987–88	10	Halton	Old Rockferrians	No relegation
1988–89	12	Hoylake	Shell Stanlow	No relegation
1989–90	9	Vagabonds	Wallasey	No relegation
1990–91	8	St. Mary's Old Boys	Mossley Hill	No relegation
1991–92	8	Birchfield	Wallasey (Note: The North-West West leagues would be restructured for the following season. This meant all teams in North-West West 3 would be transferred into the tier above - which would be split into two regional divisions. Wallasey, Moore and Helsby would go into Cheshire, while Birchfield, Halton, Hightown and Lucas would go into South Lancashire.)	No relegation
Green backgrounds are promotion places.

=== South Lancs/Cheshire 3 (1996–2000) ===
The division would be reintroduced for the 1996–97 season, this time with the name South Lancs/Cheshire 3 and at tier 12 of the league system. Promotion would be to South Lancs/Cheshire 2 (formerly North-West West 2) while relegation would be down to the newly formed South Lancs/Cheshire 4. From the 1998–99 season onward the league was known as EuroManx South Lancs/Cheshire 3 after its sponsor EuroManx.

South Lancs/Cheshire 3 Honours
Season	No of Teams	Champions	Runners–up	Relegated Teams
1996–97	8	Marple	St. Mary's Old Boys	Vulcan, Mossley Hill
1997–98	8	Shell Stanlow	Prenton	Halton, Hoylake
1998–99	8	Moore	Douglas	Didsbury Toc H
1999–00	8	Runcorn	Hoylake (Note: 3rd place Liverpool Collegiate were also promoted.)	Vulcan, Oxton Parkonians
Green backgrounds are promotion places.

=== South Lancs/Cheshire 3 (2000–2015) ===
Northern league restructuring by the RFU at the end of the 1999-2000 season saw the cancellation of North West 1, North West 2 and North West 3 (tiers 7-9). This meant that South/Lancs Cheshire 3 became a tier 9 league. The division would continue to be known as EuroManx South Lancs/Cheshire 1 until the 2007–08 season when EuroManx ceased operations. At the end of 2014–15 season South Lancs/Cheshire 2 and South Lancs/Cheshire 3 were discontinued and all teams were transferred into Cheshire (South), Lancashire (North) or Merseyside (West).

South Lancs/Cheshire 3 Honours
Season	No of Teams	Champions	Runners–up	Relegated Teams
2000–01	9	Anselmians	Runcorn	No relegation (Note: No relegation as division to increase from 9 to 10 teams for the following season.)
2001–02	10	Hoylake	Bowdon	No relegation (Note: No relegation as division to increase from 9 to 10 teams for the following season.)
2002–03	11	Ruskin Park	Orrell	Crosby St. Mary's
2003-04	11	Manchester Wanderers	Wallasey	Congleton
2004–05	12	Sale FC	St. Edward's Old Boys	Trentham, Prenton
2005–06	11	Oswestry	Sefton	No relegation
2006–07	11	Southport	Liverpool Collegiate	Marple
2007–08	11	Douglas	Trentham	Oxton Parkonians
2008–09	12	Oldershaw	Liverpool Collegiate (Note: Moore and Marple were also promoted. This was due to the cancellation of South Lancs/Cheshire 4 leading to restructuring of the South Lancs/Cheshire leagues.)	Mossley Hill, Newton-le-Willows, Eagle (Note: As South Lancs/Cheshire 4 was to be abolished all relegated teams would join North Lancs 2 instead.)
2009–10	11	Holmes Chapel	Ramsey	No relegation
2010–11	12	Crewe & Nantwich	Ellesmere Port	No relegation
2011–12	12	Wallasey	Buxton	No relegation
2012–13	12	Manchester Medics	Port Sunlight	No relegation
2013–14	12	Prenton	Trentham	No relegation
2014–15	11	Ellesmere Port	Ramsey (IOM)	No relegation
Green backgrounds are promotion places.

== South Lancs/Cheshire 3 (2016-2017) ==
After just one season Cheshire (South) and Merseyside (West) were discontinued and South Lancs/Cheshire 2 and South Lancs/Cheshire 3 reinstated for the 2016–17 season with all clubs transferred back into these divisions.

South Lancs/Cheshire 3 Honours
Season	No of Teams	Champions	Runners–up	Relegated Teams
2016–17	14	Aspull	Congleton	No relegation
Green backgrounds are promotion places.

== Lancs/Cheshire 3 (2017-2019) ==
A further restructure for the 2018–19 season saw South Lancs/Cheshire 3 renamed to Lancs/Cheshire 3. At the end of the 2018–19 the division was cancelled.

Lancs/Cheshire 3 Honours
Season	No of Teams	Champions	Runners–up	Relegated Teams
2017–18	9	Garstang	Birchfield	No relegation
2018–19	11	Ramsey	Ellesmere Port	No relegation
Green backgrounds are promotion places.

== Number of league titles ==
- Ellesmere Port (2) (Note: One of Ellesmere Port's titles was won when the club were known as Shell Stanlow.)
- Hoylake (2)
- Anselmians (1)
- Aspull (1)
- Birchfield (1)
- Crewe & Nantwich (1)
- Douglas (1)
- Garstang (1)
- Halton (1)
- Holmes Chapel (1)
- Manchester Medics (1)
- Manchester Wanderers (1)
- Marple (1)
- Moore (1)
- Oldershaw (1)
- Oswestry (1)
- Prenton (1)
- Ramsey (1)
- Runcorn (1)
- Ruskin Park (1)
- Sale FC (1)
- Southport (1)
- St. Mary's Old Boys (1)
- Vagabonds (1)
- Wallasey (1)

== See also ==
- Cheshire RFU
- Lancashire RFU
- English rugby union system
- Rugby union in England
