= Cheshire (South) =

- Current season or competition: 2015–16 Cheshire (South)
- Sport: Rugby union
- Instituted: 2015; 11 years ago
- Ceased: 2016; 10 years ago
- Number of teams: 13
- Country: England
- Holders: Manchester Medics (1st title) (2015–16) (promoted to South Lancs/Cheshire 1)
- Most titles: Manchester Medics (1 title)
- Website: clubs.rfu.com

Cheshire (South) was a regional league for teams from the Cheshire area which was ranked at tier 8 of the English rugby union system. The league had replaced South Lancs/Cheshire 2 and South Lancs/Cheshire 3. The league was contested for just one season and the following season South Lancs/Cheshire divisions 2 and 3 were restored.

== Participating Clubs 2015-16 ==
Team	Ground	Capacity	City/Area	Previous season
Ashton-on-Mersey	Banky Lane		Ashton-on-Mersey, Sale, Greater Manchester	Transferred from South Lancs/Cheshire 2 (14th)
Congleton	Congleton Leisure Centre		Congleton, Cheshire	Transferred from South Lancs/Cheshire 3 (3rd)
Dukinfield	Playing Fields		Dukinfield, Greater Manchester	Transferred from South Lancs/Cheshire 2 (5th)
Eagle	Thornton Road		Great Sankey, Warrington, Cheshire	Transferred from North Lancashire 2 (2nd)
Heaton Moor	Heaton's Sports Club		Heaton Moor, Stockport, Greater Manchester	Relegated from North Lancashire/Cumbria (12th)
Knutsford	Knutsford Academy		Knutsford, Cheshire	Transferred from South Lancs/Cheshire 3 (10th)
Linley & Kidsgrove	Kidsgrove Cricket Club		Kidsgrove, Staffordshire	Transferred from South Lancs/Cheshire 3 (5th)
Manchester Medics	Grey Mare Lane		Manchester, Greater Manchester	Transferred from South Lancs/Cheshire 1 (13th)
Marple	Ridge Sports Pavilion		Marple, Greater Manchester	Transferred from South Lancs/Cheshire 2 (11th)
Moore	Moss Lane		Moore, Cheshire	Transferred from South Lancs/Cheshire 2 (9th)
Oswestry	Granville Park		Oswestry, Shropshire	Transferred from South Lancs/Cheshire 2 (4th)
Ramsey	Mooragh Park		Ramsey, Isle of Man	Transferred from South Lancs/Cheshire 3 (2nd)
Trentham	New Inn Lane		Trentham, Stoke-on-Trent, Staffordshire	Transferred from South Lancs/Cheshire 2 (13th)
Vagabonds	Ballafletcher Sports Grounds		Douglas, Isle of Man	Transferred from South Lancs/Cheshire 2 (8th)

Locations of the 2015-16 Cheshire (South) teams
Locations of the 2015-16 Cheshire (South) teams in Greater Manchester

== Cheshire (South) Honours ==
Cheshire (South) Honours
Season	No of Teams	Champions	Runners–up	Relegated Teams	League Name
2015–16	13	Manchester Medics	Oswestry	No relegation	Cheshire (South)
Green backgrounds are promotion places.

== See also ==
- Merseyside (West)
- Lancashire (North)
- English Rugby Union Leagues
- English rugby union system
- Rugby union in England
