= Lancs/Cheshire Division Two =

Defunct English rugby league

Counties 3 ADM Lancashire & Cheshire
- Current season or competition: 2024-25 Counties 3 ADM Lancashire & Cheshire
- Sport: Rugby union
- Instituted: 1987; 39 years ago
- Number of teams: 9
- Country: England, Isle of Man
- Most titles: Anselmians (5 titles)
- Website: England RFU

Counties 3 ADM Lancashire & Cheshire (formerly Lancs/Cheshire Division Two (usually referred to as Lancs/Cheshire 2)) is a regional English Rugby Union league for teams in Cheshire, Merseyside, Lancashire and Greater Manchester at level 9 of the English rugby union system.

The division was initially known as North-West West 2 when it was created in 1987, and had a number of different names with South Lancs/Cheshire 2 being the longest running. The division switched to its name for the 2018–19 season due to the restructuring of the northern leagues by the Rugby Football Union (RFU) as a result of 19 Lancashire clubs withdrawing from RFU competitions to form their own competitions. Each season three teams from Lancs/Cheshire 2 were picked to take part in the RFU Junior Vase (a national competition for clubs at levels 9-12) - two clubs affiliated with the Cheshire RFU, the other with the Lancashire RFU.

The division had a break for the 2015-16 season as the RFU decided to restructure the South Lancs/Cheshire league into three zones - Merseyside (West), Cheshire (South) and Lancashire (North). This was short-lived and the division returned to its original format for the 2016-17 season with only Lancashire (North) remaining of the three zones.

After the introduction of North 2 West at tier 7 for the 2019–20 season, all Lancs/Cheshire leagues dropped one level, with Lancs/Cheshire Division Two ranked at level 9.

Following the cancellation of Adult Competitive Leagues (National League 1 and below) for the 2020/21 season due to the coronavirus pandemic, the league was mothballed with teams transferred into the Lancashire Merit Table competitions, ADM Lancashire leagues or level transferred into other regional leagues.

After a hiatus for season 2021-22 the league returned in its new guise following the restructuring of the English rugby union system ahead of the 2022–23 season, with the league renamed to Counties 3 ADM Lancashire & Cheshire.

Promotion is to Counties 2 ADM Lancashire & Cheshire and relegation to Lancashire RFU merit leagues.

== Teams 2026-27 ==
Departing were champions Fleetwood and play-off winners Orrell both promoted to Counties 2 ADM Lancashire & Cheshire. Also departing were Congleton (11th) relegated to Counties 4 Midlands West (North).

Ramsey (13th) were initially placed in the league but withdrew before the season began.

From February 2027 the league will divide into a Major Conference and Minor Conference with the top 7 sides playing in the former and the lower 7 sides in the latter providing clubs with 6 more fixtures.

Team	Ground	Capacity	City/Area	Previous season
Ashton-under-Lyne	Gambrel Bank		Ashton-under-Lyne, Greater Manchester	4th
Burnley	Holden Road		Burnley, Lancashire	6th
Bury	Bury Sports Club		Bury, Greater Manchester	2nd
Clitheroe	Littlemore Road		Clitheroe, Lancashire	8th
Colne & Nelson	Holt House		Colne, Lancashire	14th
Dukinfield	Playing Fields		Dukinfield, Greater Manchester	7th
Hoylake	Carham Road		Hoylake, Merseyside	10th
Oldham	Manor Park		Oldham, Greater Manchester	5th
Ormskirk	Green Lane		Ormskirk, Lancashire	9th
Oxton Parkonians	HM Curphey Memorial Ground		Oxton, Birkenhead, Merseyside	Re-entry
Prenton	Prenton Dell Road		Prenton, Birkenhead, Merseyside	Re-entry
St Edward's OB	Bishops Court		Liverpool, Merseyside	Re-entry
Vagabonds	Port-E-Chee		Douglas, Isle of Man	12th

Locations of the 2026-27 Counties 3 ADM Lancashire & Cheshire teams
Locations of the 2026-27 Counties 3 ADM Lancashire & Cheshire teams in Greater Manchester

== Teams 2025-26 ==
Departing were De La Salle (Salford) and Garstang (champions), promoted to Counties 2 ADM Lancashire & Cheshire.

From February 2026 the league divided into a Major Conference and Minor Conference with the top 7 sides playing in the former and the lower 7 sides in the latter providing clubs with 6 more fixtures.

Team	Ground	Capacity	City/Area	Previous season
Ashton-under-Lyne	Gambrel Bank		Ashton-under-Lyne, Greater Manchester	9th
Burnley	Holden Road		Burnley, Lancashire	7th
Bury	Bury Sports Club		Bury, Greater Manchester	3rd
Clitheroe	Littlemore Road		Clitheroe, Lancashire	4th
Colne & Nelson	Holt House		Colne, Lancashire	5th
Congleton	Congleton Park		Congleton, Cheshire	Re-entry
Dukinfield	Playing Fields		Dukinfield, Greater Manchester	10th
Fleetwood	Melbourne Avenue		Fleetwood, Lancashire	8th
Hoylake	Carham Road		Hoylake, Merseyside	Relegated from Counties 2 ADM Lancashire & Cheshire
Oldham	Manor Park		Oldham, Greater Manchester	Relegated from Counties 2 ADM Lancashire & Cheshire
Ormskirk	Green Lane		Ormskirk, Lancashire	6th
Orrell	St John Rigby College		Orrell, Greater Manchester	12th
Ramsey	Mooragh Park		Ramsey, Isle of Man	Re-entry
Vagabonds	Port-E-Chee		Douglas, Isle of Man	11th

Locations of the 2025-26 Counties 3 ADM Lancashire & Cheshire teams
Locations of the 2025-26 Counties 3 ADM Lancashire & Cheshire teams in Greater Manchester

== Teams 2024-25 ==
Departing were Wigan and Thornton-Cleveleys, promoted to Counties 2 ADM Lancashire & Cheshire.

Joining were Fleetwood and De La Salle (Salford) relegated from Counties 2 ADM Lancashire & Cheshire together with Vagabonds, Ashton-under-Lyne, Colne & Nelson and Blackpool promoted from the Lancashire RFU merit leagues.

Blackpool has initially been placed in the league but withdrew before the season started and instead opted to compete in the Halbro NW leagues (Div 2 North).

Old Bedians (10th in 2023-24) withdrew from the league in November "... for the benefit of the club, with the aim to improve player enjoyment this season and increase player numbers in the future".

Team	Ground	Capacity	City/Area	Previous season
Ashton-under-Lyne	Gambrel Bank		Ashton-under-Lyne, Greater Manchester	Promoted from the Lancashire RFU merit leagues
Burnley	Holden Road		Burnley, Lancashire	5th
Bury	Bury Sports Club		Bury, Greater Manchester	4th
Clitheroe	Littlemore Road		Clitheroe, Lancashire	7th
Colne & Nelson	Holt House		Colne, Lancashire	Promoted from the Lancashire RFU merit leagues
De La Salle (Salford)	De La Salle Sports & Social Club		Salford, Greater Manchester	Relegated from Counties 2 ADM Lancashire & Cheshire
Dukinfield	Playing Fields		Dukinfield, Greater Manchester	9th
Fleetwood	Melbourne Avenue		Fleetwood, Lancashire	Relegated from Counties 2 ADM Lancashire & Cheshire
Garstang	Hudson Park		Garstang, Lancashire	3rd
Ormskirk	Green Lane		Ormskirk, Lancashire	8th
Orrell	St John Rigby College		Orrell, Greater Manchester	6th
Vagabonds	Port-E-Chee		Douglas, Isle of Man	Promoted from the Lancashire RFU merit leagues

Locations of the 2024-25 Counties 3 ADM Lancashire & Cheshire teams

== Teams 2023-24 ==
Departing were Hoylake and New Brighton, promoted to Counties 2 ADM Lancashire & Cheshire. Vagabonds (9th) and Port Sunlight (10th) were relegated into the Lancashire RFU merit leagues. Ellesmere Port (6th) did not return for the new season.

Joining were Ormskirk, Orrell and Wigan relegated from Counties 2 ADM Lancashire & Cheshire together with Burnley and Clitheroe promoted from the Lancashire RFU merit leagues.

Team	Ground	Capacity	City/Area	Previous season
Burnley	Holden Road		Burnley, Lancashire	Promoted from the Lancashire RFU merit leagues
Bury	Bury Sports Club		Bury, Greater Manchester	8th
Clitheroe	Littlemore Road		Clitheroe, Lancashire	Promoted from the Lancashire RFU merit leagues
Dukinfield	Playing Fields		Dukinfield, Greater Manchester	5th
Garstang	Hudson Park		Garstang, Lancashire	3rd
Old Bedians	Millgate Lane		Didsbury, Manchester, Greater Manchester	7th
Ormskirk	Green Lane		Ormskirk, Lancashire	Relegated from Counties 2 ADM Lancashire & Cheshire
Orrell	St John Rigby College		Orrell, Greater Manchester	Relegated from Counties 2 ADM Lancashire & Cheshire
Thornton-Cleveleys	Thornton Sports Centre		Thornton, Lancashire	4th
Wigan	Douglas Valley		Wigan, Greater Manchester	Relegated from Counties 2 ADM Lancashire & Cheshire

Locations of the 2023-24 Counties 3 ADM Lancashire & Cheshire teams

== Teams 2022-23 ==
This was the first season following the RFU Adult Competition Review with the league adopting its new name of Counties 3 ADM Lancashire & Cheshire.

Team	Ground	Capacity	City/Area	Previous season
Bury	Bury Sports Club		Bury, Greater Manchester	
Dukinfield	Playing Fields		Dukinfield, Greater Manchester	
Ellesmere Port	Whitby Sports & Social Club		Ellesmere Port, Cheshire	
Garstang	Hudson Park		Garstang, Lancashire	
Hoylake	Carham Road		Hoylake, Merseyside	
New Brighton	Hartsfield		Moreton, Merseyside	
Old Bedians	Millgate Lane		Didsbury, Manchester, Greater Manchester	
Port Sunlight	Leverhulme Playing Fields		Bromborough, Merseyside	
Thornton-Cleveleys	Thornton Sports Centre		Thornton, Lancashire	
Vagabonds	Port-E-Chee		Douglas, Isle of Man	

Locations of the 2022-23 Counties 3 ADM Lancashire & Cheshire teams

== Season 2021-22 ==
Not contested as many of the Lancashire RFU affiliated clubs had joined the Lancashire ADM splinter leagues.

== Season 2020–21 ==
On 30 October the RFU announced that a decision had been taken to cancel Adult Competitive Leagues (National League 1 and below) for the 2020/21 season meaning the leagues was not contested.

== Teams 2019–20 ==
Team	Ground	Capacity	City/Area	Previous season
Liverpool University	Wyncote Sports Ground		Mossley Hill, Liverpool, Merseyside	4th
Mossley Hill	Mossley Hill Athletic Club		Mossley Hill, Liverpool, Merseyside	6th
Newton-le-Willows	Newton-le-Willows Sports Club		Newton-le-Willows, Merseyside	9th
Old Bedians	Millgate Lane		Didsbury, Manchester, Greater Manchester	3rd
Oswestry	Granville Park		Oswestry, Shropshire	Relegated from Lancs/Cheshire 1 (11th)
Oxton Parkonians	HM Curphey Memorial Ground		Oxton, Birkenhead, Merseyside	10th
Port Sunlight	Leverhulme Playing Fields		Bromborough, Merseyside	Relegated from Lancs/Cheshire 1 (10th)
Ruskin Park	Ruskin Drive Sports Ground		St Helens, Merseyside	7th
Vagabonds	Port-E-Chee		Douglas, Isle of Man	8th

Locations of the 2019–20 Lancs/Cheshire Division Two teams

== Teams 2018–19 ==
Team	Ground	Capacity	City/Area	Previous season
Aspull	Wood Lane		Aspull, Greater Manchester	4th
Birchfield	Birchfield Road		Widnes, Cheshire	Promoted from Lancs/Cheshire 3 (runners up)
Congleton	Congleton Park		Congleton, Cheshire	8th
Dukinfield	Blocksages Playing Fields		Dukinfield, Greater Manchester	9th
Eccles	Gorton Street		Eccles, Greater Manchester	Transferred from North Lancashire/Cumbria (13th)
Garstang	Hudson Park		Garstang, Lancashire	Promoted from Lancs/Cheshire 3 (champions)
Marple	Ridge Sports Pavilion		Marple, Stockport, Greater Manchester	12th
New Brighton	Hartsfield	2,000	Moreton, Merseyside	Relegated from Lancs/Cheshire 1 (13th)
Orrell	St John Rigby College		Orrell, Greater Manchester	6th
Oswestry	Granville Park		Oswestry, Shropshire	10th
Port Sunlight	Leverhulme Playing Fields		Bromborough, Merseyside	11th

Locations of the 2018–19 Lancs/Cheshire 2 teams

== Teams 2017–18 ==
Team	Ground	Capacity	City/Area	Previous season
Aspull	Wood Lane		Aspull, Greater Manchester	Promoted from South Lancs/Cheshire 3 (champions)
Congleton	Congleton Park		Congleton, Cheshire	Promoted from South Lancs/Cheshire 3 (runners up)
Didsbury Toc H	Ford Lane		Didsbury, Manchester, Greater Manchester	Transferred from Lancashire (North) (3rd)
Dukinfield	Blocksages Playing Fields		Dukinfield, Greater Manchester	8th
Heaton Moor	Green Lane		Heaton Moor, Stockport, Greater Manchester	5th
Liverpool Collegiate	Aigburth Cricket Ground	3,000	Aigburth, Liverpool, Merseyside	3rd
Marple	Ridge Sports Pavilion		Marple, Stockport, Greater Manchester	7th
Oldershaw	Belvidere Recreational Ground		Oldershaw, Merseyside	10th
Orrell	St John Rigby College		Orrell, Greater Manchester	Transferred from Lancashire (North) (4th)
Oswestry	Granville Park		Oswestry, Shropshire	Relegated from South Lancs/Cheshire 1 (14th)
Port Sunlight	Leverhulme Playing Fields		Bromborough, Merseyside	9th
Vagabonds	Port-E-Chee		Douglas, Isle of Man	11th
Wigan	Douglas Valley		Wigan, Greater Manchester	Relegated from South Lancs/Cheshire 1 (13th)
Winnington Park	Burrows Hill	5,000	Hartford, Northwich, Cheshire	6th

Locations of the 2017–18 South Lancs/Cheshire 2 teams

== Participating clubs 2016-17 ==
- Dukinfield
- Eagle
- Heaton Moor
- Hoylake (relegated from South Lancs/Cheshire 1)
- Liverpool Collegiate
- Marple
- Moore
- Oldershaw
- Port Sunlight
- Ruskin Park (prompted from Merseyside (West))
- Tyldesley
- Vagabonds R.U.F.C.
- Winnington Park (relegated from South Lancs/Cheshire 1)

== 2015-16 ==
For the 2015-16 season this league, and South Lancs/Cheshire 3, were replaced by three county-wide leagues - Cheshire (South), Merseyside (West) and Lancashire (North). However, with the exception of Lancashire North, the county leagues were axed after just one season and the South Lancs/Cheshire leagues were restored.

== Participating clubs 2014-15 ==
- Ashton-on-Mersey (relegated from South Lancs/Cheshire 1)
- Dukinfield
- Liverpool Collegiate
- Marple
- Moore
- Ormskirk
- Orrell
- Oswestry
- Port Sunlight
- Prenton (promoted from South Lancs/Cheshire 3)
- Southport
- Trentham (promoted from South Lancs/Cheshire 3)
- Tyldesley (relegated from South Lancs/Cheshire 1)
- Vagabonds (I.O.M.)

== Participating clubs 2013-14 ==
- Bowdon (relegated from South Lancs/Cheshire 1)
- Dukinfield
- Liverpool Collegiate
- Manchester Medics (promoted from South Lancs/Cheshire 3)
- Marple
- Moore
- Ormskirk
- Orrell (relegated from South Lancs/Cheshire 1)
- Oswestry
- Port Sunlight (promoted from South Lancs/Cheshire 3)
- Ramsey (IoM)
- Southport
- Vagabonds (I.O.M.)
- Wallasey

== Original teams ==
When league rugby began in 1987 this division contained the following teams:

- Chester College
- Hightown
- Moore
- Old Instonians (Note: Old Instonians would merge with Old Rockferrians to form Prenton RUFC in 1992.)
- Port Sunlight
- Ruskin Park
- Sefton
- South Liverpool
- St. Mary's Old Boys
- Vulcan
- Wallasey

== Lancs/Cheshire 2 honours ==
=== North-West West 2 (1987–1992) ===
The original incarnation of Lancs/Cheshire 2 was known as North-West West 2, and was a tier 10 league with promotion up to North-West West 1 and relegation down to North-West West 3.

North-West West 2
Season	No of Teams	Champions	Runners–up	Relegated Teams
1987–88	11	Old Instonians	Ruskin Park	Wallasey, Moore
1988–89	10	Oldershaw	South Liverpool	Halton
1989–90	11	Vulcan	Hoylake	Birchfield
1990–91	11	Vagabonds	Aspull	Wallasey
1991–92	11	St. Mary's Old Boys	Old Parkonians (Note: The North-West West leagues would be reorganised for the following season with North-West West 2 being split into two regional divisions (Cheshire and South Lancashire), while North-West West 3 would be cancelled. This meant that five clubs were promoted including Eagle, Hoylake and Shell Stanlow. The rest of the clubs would be transferred into the regional divisions - Old Anselmians and Port Sunlight would go into Cheshire, while Sefton, Mossley Hill and Vulcan would go into Lancashire South. Rockferrians would merge with Old Intonians to form Prenton and join Cheshire for 1992–93.)	No relegation (Note: There was no relegation due to restructuring for the following season which would see North-West West 3 disbanded and North-West West 2 be split into two regional leagues - Cheshire and Lancashire South.)
Green backgrounds are promotion places.

=== Cheshire / Lancashire South (1992–1996) ===
Restructuring of north-west leagues saw North-West West 2 split into two new regional divisions named Cheshire and Lancashire South. Both regional divisions were initially at tier 10 but the creation of National 5 North for the 1993–94 season meant that they both dropped to become tier 11 leagues. Promotion was to the newly named Cheshire/Lancs South (formerly North-West West 1), while the cancellation of North-West West 3 meant that there was no relegation until further league restructuring at the end of the 1995–96 season.

Cheshire / Lancashire South
Season	No of Teams	Champions	Runners–up	Relegated Teams	League Name
1992–93	11	Old Anselmians	Wallasley	No relegation	Cheshire
1992–93	10	Sefton	Eccles	No relegation	Lancashire South
1993–94	10	Port Sunlight	Congleton	No relegation	Cheshire
1993–94	9	Didsbury Toc H	Vulcan	No relegation	Lancashire South
1994–95	10	Congleton	Eagle	No relegation	Cheshire
1994–95	10	Newton-le-Willows	Wallasley	No relegation	Lancashire South
1995–96	10	Old Anselmians	Wallasley	Multiple teams (Note: The restructuring of the Cheshire/Lancs leagues for the following season would see five clubs from Cheshire relegated to the new divisions - Whitehouse Park, Holmes Chapel, Moore, Shell Stanlow would drop two levels to South Lancs/Cheshire 4 while Prenton and Helsby would drop to South Lancs/Cheshire 3. Bottom side Whitehouse Park would drop out of the leagues at the end of the season.)	Cheshire
1995–96	10	Birchfield	Southport	Multiple teams (Note: The restructuring of the Cheshire/Lancs leagues for the following season would see seven clubs from Lancashire South relegated to the new divisions - Hightown and Halton would drop two levels to South Lancs/Cheshire 4 while Vulcan, St. Mary's Old Boys, Douglas, Liverpool College and Mossley Hill would drop to South Lancs/Cheshire 3.)	Lancashire South
Green backgrounds are promotion places.

=== South Lancs/Cheshire 2 (1996–2000) ===
The league system was restructured from top to bottom by the Rugby Football Union for the start of the 1996–97 season. Firstly, as part of the reorganisation of the Cheshire and Lancashire leagues, the two regional divisions Cheshire and Lancashire were merged back into a single division called South/Lancs Cheshire 2. The cancellation of National 5 North and creation of North West 3 meant that South Lancs/Cheshire 2 was a tier 11 league, with promotion to South/Lancs Cheshire 1 (formerly Cheshire/Lancs South) and relegation to the newly formed South Lancs/Cheshire 3 (previously North-West West 3).

South Lancs/Cheshire 2
Season	No of Teams	Champions	Runners–up	Relegated Teams
1996–97	10	Southport	Crewe & Nantwich	Port Sunlight, Hotlake
1997–98	10	Wallasley	Birchfield	Didsbury TOC, Old Parkonians
1998–99	9	Dukinfield	Crosby St. Mary's	Oxton Parkonians
1999–00	10	Ellesmere Port	Moore	Prenton, Bowdon, Ruskin Park
Green backgrounds are promotion places.

=== South Lancs/Cheshire 2 (2000–2015) ===
Northern league restructuring by the RFU at the end of the 1999-2000 season saw the cancellation of North West 1, North West 2 and North West 3 (tiers 7-9). This meant that South/Lancs Cheshire 2 became a tier 8 league. At the end of 2014–15 season South Lancs/Cheshire 2 and South Lancs/Cheshire 3 were discontinued and all teams were transferred into Cheshire (South), Lancashire (North) or Merseyside (West).

South Lancs/Cheshire 2
Season	No of Teams	Champions	Runners–up	Relegated Teams
2000–01	12	Dukinfield	Ormskirk	Newton-le-Willows
2001–02	12	Wirral	Southport	Crosby St Mary's, Wallasey
2002–03	12	Anselmians	Bowdon	Runcorn, Trentham
2003–04	12	Hoylake	Sandbach	Moore, St Edward's Old Boys
2004–05	11	Anselmians	Oldershaw	Ellesmere Port, Ashton-on-Mersey
2005–06	12	Sale FC	Dukinfield	Southport, Manchester Wanderers
2006–07	11	Ruskin Park	Wigan	St Edward's Old Boys
2007–08	12	Dukinfield	Ormskirk	Oldershaw, Liverpool Collegiate
2008–09	12	Anselmians	Warrington (Note: 3rd place Oswestry also promoted.)	No relegation (Note: No relegation as division due to increase from 12 to 13 teams for the following season.)
2009–10	13	Liverpool Collegiate	Ashton-on-Mersey	Crewe and Nantwich
2010–11	14	Orrell	Warrington	Holmes Chapel, Wallasey
2011–12	14	Ruskin Park	Crewe and Nantwich	Ellesmere Port, Trentham
2012–13	14	Sefton	Douglas	Buxton, Oldershaw
2013–14	14	Manchester Medics	Bowdon	Wallasey, Ramsey
2014–15	14	Liverpool Collegiate	Tyldesley	Ashton-on-Mersey, Trentham
Green backgrounds are promotion places.

=== South Lancs/Cheshire 2 (2016–2018) ===
After just one season Cheshire (South) and Merseyside (West) were discontinued and South Lancs/Cheshire 2 and South Lancs/Cheshire 3 reinstated for the 2016–17 seasons with all clubs transferred back into these divisions.

South Lancs/Cheshire 2
Season	No of Teams	Champions	Runners–up	Relegated Teams
2016–17	12	Tyldesley	Hoylake	No relegation (Note: Due to the restructuring of the South Lancs/Cheshire leagues for the following season there was no relegation.)
2017–18	12	Winnington Park	Liverpool Collegiate	Oldershaw, Vagabonds
Green backgrounds are promotion places.

=== Lancs/Cheshire 2 (2018–present) ===
A further restructure for the 2018–19 season saw South Lancs/Cheshire 2 renamed to Lancs/Cheshire 2. The cancellation of South Lancs/Cheshire 3 at the end of the 2019–20 season meant that there was no longer relegation, although promotion still continued to Lancs/Cheshire 1. The introduction of North 2 West for the 2019–20 season saw Lancs/Cheshire drop to become a tier 9 league.

South Lancs/Cheshire 2
Season	No of Teams	Champions	Runners–up	Relegated Teams
2018–19	11	Aspull	Eccles	Oswestry, Port Sunlight
2019–20	9	Port Sunlight	Vagabonds	No relegation
2020–21	9 (Note: 2 teams from the newly restructured Lancs/Cheshire Division Two dropped out of the RFU leagues to join the ADM Lancashire Leagues.)			
Green backgrounds are promotion places.

== Number of league titles ==
- Anselmians (5) (Note: Anselmians victories includes two league titles when the club was known as Old Anselmians.)
- Dukinfield (3)
- Liverpool Collegiate (2)
- Port Sunlight (2)
- Ruskin Park (2)
- Sefton (2)
- Aspull (1)
- Birchfield (1)
- Congleton (1)
- Didsbury Toc H (1)
- Ellesmere Port (1)
- Hoylake (1)
- Manchester Medics (1)
- Newton-le-Willows (1)
- Old Instonians (1)
- Oldershaw (1)
- Orrell (1)
- Sale FC (1)
- Southport (1)
- St. Mary's Old Boys (1)
- Tyldesley (1)
- Vagabonds (1)
- Vulcan (1)
- Wallasley (1)
- Winnington Park (1)
- Wirral (1)

== See also ==
- Cheshire RFU
- Lancashire RFU
- English rugby union system
- Rugby union in England
