= Charles Sawyer (sportsman) =

England international rugby union player & cricketer

- Full name: Charles Montague Sawyer
- Born: 20 March 1856 Rusholme, England
- Died: 30 March 1921 (aged 65) Ormskirk, England

Rugby union career
- Position: Three-quarters
Senior career
Years	Team	Apps	(Points)
–	Broughton RUFC		
–	Southport RFC		
International career
Years	Team	Apps	(Points)
1880–81	England	2	(0)
- Cricket career

Cricket information

Domestic team information
- Years: Team
- 1884: Lancashire County Cricket Club

Charles Montague Sawyer (20 March 1856 – 30 March 1921) was an English cricketer, and rugby union footballer who played in the 1880s and early 1890s. He played representative level cricket for Lancashire, Gentlemen of Lancashire, and at club level for Broughton Cricket Club , and representative level rugby union (RU) for England, and at club level for Broughton RUFC and Southport RFC, as a Three-quarters, e.g. Wing, or Centre.

== Cricket ==
He appeared in two first-class matches with Lancashire County Cricket Club in 1884 as a right-handed batsman, scoring 21 runs with a highest score of 11*.

== Rugby ==
Charles Sawyer won caps for England while at Broughton RUFC in the 1879–80 Home Nations rugby union matches against Scotland, and scored a try in the 1880–81 Home Nations rugby union matches against Ireland.

== Personal life ==
Sawyer married in 1886 in the Altrincham district.
