= SJR =

SJR can refer to:

- Saint Joseph Regional High School, a private boys' school in Montvale, United States
- Saint-Jean-sur-Richelieu, a city in Montérégie, Canada
- Sally Jessy Raphael, an American talk show host
- SCImago Journal Rank, a journal metric
- Shin Megami Tensei: Strange Journey Redux, a 3DS video game
- St. John's-Ravenscourt School, a private school in Winnipeg, Canada
- St John Rigby College, a sixth form college in Wigan, England
- State Journal-Register, a newspaper in Springfield, Illinois, United States
