= David Cusani =

English rugby union player (born 1959)

David Anthony Cusani (born 16 July 1959) is a former English rugby union player. Cusani played for the Orrell club as a lock and won one international cap for the England national rugby union team, against Ireland in February 1987.

David Cusani
Born	16 July, 1959 Wigan, England
Height	2.00 m (6 ft 7in)
Weight	112 kg (245 lb)
Rugby Union Career
Position	Lock / Number 8
Career Statistics
Wigan RUFC	1978-1980
Orrell RUFC	1980-1988 1989-1991
Liverpool St Helens RUFC	1988-1989
Macclesfield RUFC	1991-1995
Lancashire RUFC	1981-1990 (24 appearances)
England RUFC	England B v Ireland B, Belfast 1982 England Tour of South African 1984 England v Ireland, Landsdowne Road 7 February 1987 England B v France B, Bath, 14 February 1987 England B v Australia, Sale RUFC, 1988 England v Italy, Rovigo, May 1990
Barbarians RUFC	Barbarians v Italy, Stadio Flaminio Rome, May 1985

== Early life ==
Cusani was born in Wigan, the home of rugby.

== Education ==
Cusani was educated at St John Rigby College, Wigan formerly a grammar school where he played rugby union from the age of 11. Whilst in higher education, Cusani concentrated on club rugby, playing for Wigan RUFC.

== Rugby Career ==
Started at Wigan RUFC via Wigan and Lancashire Colts, before moving to the local senior club Orrell RUFC in 1980, where he continued to flourish for a decade, eventually forming a fearsome partnership with "the giant" Bob Kimmins. During this time he continued to impress, following calls up to represent Lancashire B, Lancashire, England U23's and England B, culminating in full England tour of South Africa in 1984.

Unfortunately on returning from South Africa, Cusani suffered a cartilage knee injury which put him out of the game, despite several come back attempts between 1984-1986. During this time, whilst semi-fit he went on a Lancashire Tour and was called up to play for the Barbarians v Italy in Rome in May 1985.

Returning to full fitness, Cusani was called up to replace an injured Wade Dooley to play for the North of England in 1986 winning the Divisional Championship and again in 1987. These performances resulted in Cusani's selection for England v Ireland at Landsdowne Road, Dublin in February 1987. Cusani remained part of the England squad until his retirement from senior rugby in 1991. In this period, he was a non-travelling reserve for the first Rugby World Cup in Australia / New Zealand, 1987. He played for England B against France (1987) and Australia (1988), culminating in selection England v Italy played at Rovigo May 1990 where Cusani played at Number 8 for only the fifth time in his career.

On the back of a business move, Cusani relocated to Macclesfield and took the unusual step to drop down many divisions to play for the local club Macclesfield RUFC. For the next four years, before retiring from rugby aged 35, he steered the club to two league promotions and two Cheshire Cup victories, the first against Sale RUFC, the local senior club.
