= Frank Moss (rugby union) =

England international rugby union footballer

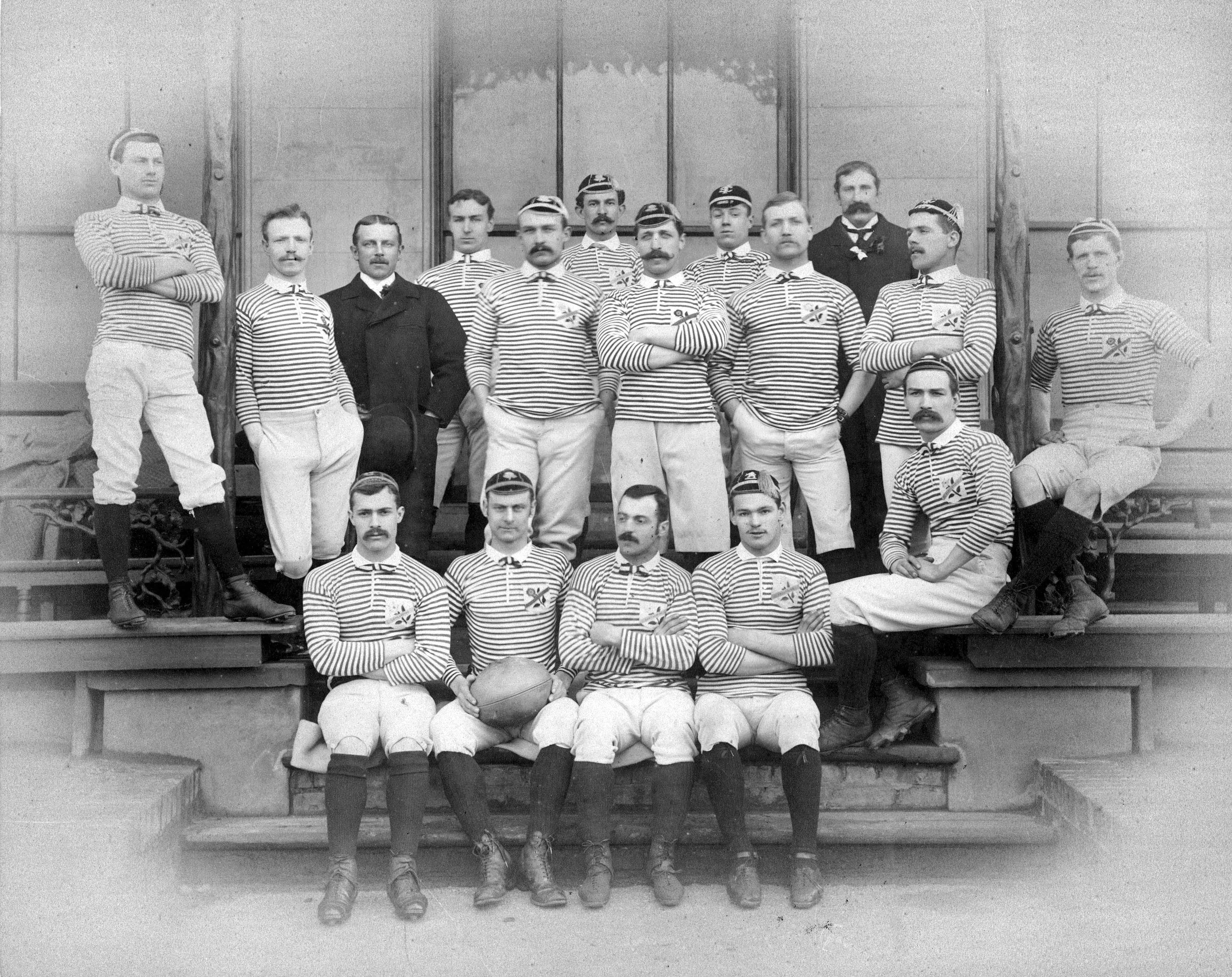
- F. S. Moss standing centre arms folded (Lancashire)
- Full name: Frank Jacob Slazenger Moss
- Born: first ¼ 1860 Manchester, England
- Died: 9 August 1938 (aged 78) Belgrade, Maine, United States

Rugby union career
- Position: Forward
Senior career
Years	Team	Apps	(Points)
–	Broughton RUFC		
–	Lancashire		
International career
Years	Team	Apps	(Points)
1885-86	England	3	(0)

Frank Jacob Slazenger Moss (birth registered first ¼ 1860 – 9 August 1938) was an English rugby union footballer who played in the 1880s. He played at representative level for England, and Lancashire, and at club level for Broughton RUFC, as a forward.

== Background ==
Frank Moss was born at 159 York Street, Cheetham, Manchester, Lancashire, and he died aged 78 of a heart attack in Belgrade, Maine, United States.

== Playing career ==
Frank Moss won caps for England while at Broughton RUFC in the 1885 Home Nations Championship against Wales, and Ireland, and in the 1886 Home Nations Championship against Wales.

Frank Moss won cap(s) for Lancashire while at Broughton RUFC including against Middlesex at The Oval on Saturday 12 March 1887, that was attended by the Prince of Wales (later Edward VII), and is believed to be the first rugby match attended by royalty.

== Genealogical information ==
Moss married Blanche Mayer on 10 June 1907.
