= North Lancashire 2 =

English rugby union league

- Current season or competition: 2014–15 North Lancashire 2
- Sport: Rugby union
- Instituted: 1987; 39 years ago
- Ceased: 2015; 11 years ago
- Number of teams: 9
- Country: England
- Holders: Pendle (1st title) (2014–15) (promoted to North Lancashire 1)
- Most titles: Ashton-under-Lyne (4 titles)
- Website: clubs.rfu.com

North Lancashire Division 2 was an English Rugby Union league for teams from North Lancashire. The division was initially known as North-West East 2 when it was created in 1987, and had a number of different names since with North Lancashire 2 being the longest running. Promotion from this division was into North Lancashire 1 but there was no relegation as this is the basement division of club rugby union in North Lancashire. This league, and the three other lowest level north west leagues, were replaced in 2015 by three county-specific leagues - Cheshire (South), Merseyside (West) and Lancashire (North).

== Participating Clubs 2014-15 ==
- Bury
- Carnforth
- Clitheroe
- Colne & Nelson
- Crosby St Mary's
- Eagle
- Hutton (relegated from North Lancashire 1)
- Mossley Hill (relegated from North Lancashire 1)
- Newton-le-Willows
- Old Bedians
- Pendle

== Participating Clubs 2013-14 ==
- Birchfield
- Broughton
- Bury (relegated from North Lancashire 1)
- Carnforth
- Clitheroe
- Colne & Nelson
- Crosby St Mary's
- Eagle
- Newton-le-Willows
- North Manchester (relegated from North Lancashire 1)
- Old Bedians
- Pendle

== Participating Clubs 2012-13 ==
- Ashton-under-Lyne
- Birchfield
- Carnforth
- Chorley
- Clitheroe
- Colne & Nelson
- Crosby St Mary's
- Eagle
- Newton-le-Willows
- Old Bedians
- Pendle
- Thornton Cleveleys

== Original teams ==
When league rugby began in 1987 this division contained the following teams based in Cheshire, Greater Manchester and Lancashire:

- Bolton
- Broughton
- Bury
- Chorley
- Crewe & Nantwich
- Dunkinfield
- Greater Manchester Fire Service
- Manchester YMCA
- Marple
- Oldham College (Note: Oldham College would merge with and become part of North Manchester Rugby Club in 1991.)

== North Lancashire 2 honours ==
=== North-West East 2 (1987–1992) ===
The original incarnation of North Lancashire 2 was known as North-West East 2, and was a tier 11 league with promotion up to North-West East 2. Initially, there was no relegation until the creation of North-West East 3 for the 1989–90 season.

North-West East 2 Honours
Season	No of Teams	Champions	Runners–up	Relegated Teams
1987–88	10	Bolton	Crewe & Nantwich	No relegation
1988–89	12	Broughton	Greater Manchester Fire Service	Bowdon, Oldham College (Note: The creation of North-West East 3 for the 1989–90 season meant there was relegation while that division was active.)
1989–90	11	Ashton-under-Lyne	Manchester YMCA	Agecroft, North Manchester
1990–91	10	Calder Vale	Bury	Dukinfield, Lostock
1991–92	11	Marple	Littleborough (Note: Restructuring of the north-west leagues at the end of the 1991–92 season meant that all clubs in the division would be promoted/transferred to tier 10 leagues. Marple, Littleborough, Bolton, Ashton-under-Lyme, Colne & Nelson, Chorley and Heaton Moor would join Lancashire North 1, Congleton and Bowdon would join Cheshire and Didsbury TOC H would join Lancashire. Wigan Tech would drop out of the league system.)	No relegation (Note: The cancellation of North-West East 3 at the end of the 1991–92 season meant there was relegation.)
Green backgrounds are promotion places.

=== Lancashire North 2 (1992–1996) ===
North-West East 2 was renamed as Lancashire North 2 for the start of the 1992–93 season with promotion to Lancashire North 1 (formerly North-West East 1), while the cancellation of North-West East 3 meant there was no longer relegation. Initially a tier 11 league, the creation of National 5 North for the 1993–94 season saw Lancashire North 2 become a tier 12 league.

Lancashire North 2 Honours
Season	No of Teams	Champions	Runners–up	Relegated Teams
1992–93	5	Clitheroe	Dukinfield	No relegation
1993–94	8	Heaton Moor	North Manchester	No relegation
1994–95	9	Eccles	Littleborough	No relegation
1995–96	9	Old Bedians	Broughton	No relegation
Green backgrounds are promotion places.

=== North Lancashire 2 (1996–2000) ===
The league system was restructured from top to bottom by the Rugby Football Union for the start of the 1996–97 season. Lancashire North 2 was renamed as North Lancashire 2, and the cancellation of National 5 North and creation of North West 3 meant that it remained a tier 12 league. Promotion continued to North Lancashire 1 (formerly Lancashire North 1).

North Lancashire 2 Honours
Season	No of Teams	Champions	Runners–up	Relegated Teams
1996–97	8	Oldham	Eccles	No relegation
1997–98	7	Colne & Nelson	Chorley	No relegation
1998–99	7	Burnage	Thornton-Cleveleys	No relegation
1999–00	7	Didsbury Toc H	North Manchester	No relegation
Green backgrounds are promotion places.

=== North Lancashire 2 (2000–2015) ===
Northern league restructuring by the RFU at the end of the 1999–00 season saw the cancellation of North West 1, North West 2 and North West 3 (tiers 7-9). This meant that North Lancashire 2 became a tier 8 league, with promotion continuing to North Lancashire 1. North Lancashire 2 was cancelled at the end of the 2014–15 season as part of restructuring by the RFU who decided to break up the North Lancashire and South Lancs/Cheshire leagues into 3 different zones - Cheshire (South), Lancashire (North) and Merseyside (West).

North Lancashire 2 Honours
Season	No of Teams	Champions	Runners–up	Relegated Teams
2000–01	9	Fylde Saracens	Thornton-Cleveleys	No relegation
2001–02	11	Ashton-Under-Lyne	Littleborough	No relegation
2002–03	8	West Park Warriors	Chorley	No relegation
2003–04	9	Tarleton	Thornton-Cleveleys	No relegation
2004–05	9	Old Bedians	Colne & Nelson	No relegation
2005–06	8	Birchfield	Blackpool	No relegation
2006–07	9	Ashton-Under-Lyne	Garstang	No relegation
2007–08	8	Furness	Bury	No relegation
2008–09	10	Hutton	Windermere (Note: Hawcoat Park, Tarleton were also promoted.)	No relegation
2009–10	11	St. Edward's Old Boys	Newton-le-Willows	No relegation
2010–11	11	Windermere	North Manchester	No relegation
2011–12	12	Manchester Medics	Mossley Hill	No relegation
2012–13	12	Ashton-Under-Lyne	Thornton-Cleveleys	No relegation
2013–14	12	North Manchester	Eagle	No relegation
2014–15	9	Pendle	Eagle	No relegation
Green backgrounds are promotion places.

== Number of league titles ==
- Ashton-under-Lyne (4)
- Old Bedians (2)
- Birchfield (1)
- Bolton (1)
- Broughton (1)
- Burnage (1)
- Calder Vale (1)
- Clitheroe (1)
- Colne & Nelson (1)
- Didsbury Toc H (1)
- Eccles (1)
- Furness (1)
- Fylde Saracens (1)
- Heaton Moor (1)
- Manchester Medics (1)
- Marple (1)
- North Manchester (1)
- Oldham (1)
- Pendle (1)
- St. Edward's Old Boys (1)
- Tarleton (1)
- West Park Warriors (1)
- Windermere (1)

== See also ==
- North Lancashire 1
- Lancashire RFU
- English Rugby Union Leagues
- English rugby union system
- Rugby union in England
