= South Lancs/Cheshire 5 =

English rugby union league

- Sport: Rugby Union
- Instituted: 2000; 26 years ago
- Ceased: 2002; 24 years ago
- Country: England
- Holders: Holmes Chapel (1st title) (2000–01) (promoted to South Lancs/Cheshire 4)
- Most titles: Holmes Chapel, Oswestry (1 title)
- Website: clubs.rfu.com

South Lancs/Cheshire 5 was a regional English rugby union league for teams from the South Lancashire, Cheshire and Manchester region and was at the tenth tier of national competition. Promoted teams moved up to South Lancs/Cheshire 4 and as the basement division in the local region there was no relegation. Dwindling numbers of teams led to the division being cancelled at the end of the 2001-02 season and teams would either move up to South Lancs/Cheshire 4 or drop out of the league altogether.

== Original teams ==
When this league was created in 2000 it contained the following teams:

- Holmes Chapel - N/A (new to league)
- Lucas Merseyside - relegated from South Lancs/Cheshire 4 (7th)
- Manchester Wanderers (Note: 2nd XV of Manchester Rugby Club.) - N/A (new to league)
- Mossley Hill - relegated from South Lancs/Cheshire 4 (4th)
- Oswestry - N/A (new to league)
- Prescot - N/A (new to league)
- Waterloo Vikings (Note: 2nd XV of Waterloo F.C.) - N/A (new to league)

== South Lancs/Cheshire 5 honours ==
South Lancs/Cheshire 5 was introduced as a tier 11 league at the start of the 2000-01 season. Promotion was to South Lancs/Cheshire 4 while as the lowest level league in the North-West division there was no relegation. After just two seasons the league was cancelled.

South Lancs/Cheshire 5 Honours
Season	No of Teams	Champions	Runners–up	Relegated Teams
2000–01	7	Oswestry	Manchester Wanderers	No relegation
2001–02	4	Holmes Chapel	Mossley Hill (Note: Mossley Hill would join champions Holmes Chapel in South Lancs/Cheshire 4 for the following season. Prescot and Burtonwood would drop out of the league.)	No relegation
Green backgrounds are promotion places.

== Number of league titles ==
- Holmes Chapel (1)
- Oswestry (1)

== See also ==
- English Rugby Union Leagues
- English rugby union system
- Rugby union in England
