= Wigan RUFC =

English rugby union club

(England) Wigan
- Full name: Wigan Rugby Union Football Club
- Union: Lancashire RFU
- Founded: 1913; 112 years ago
- Location: Wigan, Greater Manchester, England
- Ground(s): Douglas Valley
- President: Michael Singer
- Coach(es): Martin Scott
- Captain(s): Lee Scully
- League(s): South Lancs/Cheshire 2
Team kit

Official website
- www.pitchero.com/clubs/wiganrufc

Wigan Rugby Union Football Club are a rugby union team based in Wigan, Greater Manchester, England. Founded in 1913, they are based at Douglas Valley on the far edges of the Haigh Estate.

Wigan has produced talent that includes among others the late Mike Gregory, Joe Lydon and Andy Gregory who went on to forge careers at the top of rugby league, and the likes of Dave Cusani and many others who gained international and county honours at rugby union. In 2016/17, for the first time in the club's 104-year history they had mini, junior and colts teams playing in every age group, with an added bonus of an U5's and 6's training team. In total, mini and junior playing membership is now over 200, there are 30 qualified mini and junior volunteer coaches.

Wigan RUFC was the RFU Junior and Mini Section of the Year for 2017–18, and was awarded RFU Kids First Champion Club December 2017.

== Club Honours ==
- North West 1 champions: 1988–89
- North West 3 champions: 1998–99
