= Merseyside (West) =

Regional English Rugby Union league

- Sport: Rugby union
- Instituted: 2015; 11 years ago
- Ceased: 2016; 10 years ago
- Number of teams: 12
- Country: England
- Holders: Southport (1st title) (2015-16)
- Most titles: Southport (1 title)
- Website: clubs.rfu.com

Merseyside (West) was a regional league for teams from the Merseyside area which ranked at tier 8 of the English rugby union system. The league had replaced South Lancs/Cheshire 2 and South Lancs/Cheshire 3. The league was contested for just one season and the following season South Lancs/Cheshire divisions 2 and 3 were restored.

== Participating Clubs 2015-16 ==
Locations of the 2015-16 Merseyside (West) teams in Merseyside
Locations of the 2015-16 Merseyside (West) teams in Cheshire

Team	Ground	Capacity	City/Area	Previous season
Birchfield	Birchfield Park Sports & Social Club		Widnes, Cheshire	Transferred from North Lancashire 1 (9th)
Ellesmere Port	Whitby Sports and Social Club		Ellesmere Port, Cheshire	Transferred from South Lancs/Cheshire 3 (1st)
Liverpool University Medics	Wyncote Playing Fields		Liverpool, Merseyside	Transferred from South Lancs/Cheshire 3 (8th)
Mossley Hill	Mossley Hill Athletic Club		Liverpool, Merseyside	Transferred from North Lancashire 2 (5th)
Newton-le-Willows	Newton-le-Willows Sports Club		Newton-le-Willows, Merseyside	Transferred from North Lancashire 2 (9th)
Oldershaw	Belvidere Recreational Ground		Wallasey, Merseyside	Transferred from South Lancs/Cheshire 3 (6th)
Oxton Parkonians	Holm Lane		Oxton, Birkenhead, Merseyside	Transferred from South Lancs/Cheshire 3 (7th)
Port Sunlight	Leverhulme Playing Fields		Bromborough, Merseyside	Transferred from South Lancs/Cheshire 2 (10th)
Prenton	Prenton Dell Road		Prenton, Birkenhead, Merseyside	N/A
Ruskin Park	Ruskin Drive Sports Ground		St Helens, Merseyside	Transferred from South Lancs/Cheshire 1 (14th)
Southport	Recreation Ground	3,500	Southport, Merseyside	Transferred from South Lancs/Cheshire 2 (3rd)
St. Edward's Old Boys	Sandfield Park		Liverpool, Merseyside	Transferred from North Lancashire 1 (11th)
Wallasey	Cross Lane		Wallasey, Merseyside	Transferred from South Lancs/Cheshire 3

== Merseyside (West) Honours ==
Merseyside (West) Honours
Season	No of Teams	Champions	Runners–up	Relegated Teams	League Name
2015–16	12	Southport	Ruskin Park	No relegation	Merseyside (West)
Green backgrounds are promotion places.

== See also ==
- Cheshire (South)
- Lancashire (North)
- English Rugby Union Leagues
- English rugby union system
- Rugby union in England
