= Manchester Medics RUFC =

(England) Manchester Medics RUFC
- Full name: Manchester Medics Rugby Union Football Club
- Location: Manchester, England
- Ground: Broughton Park RUFC
- President: Alex Blackburn
- Captain: Oly Farnell
- League: Counties 4 ADM Lancashire & Cheshire

Official website
- www.pitchero.com/clubs/manchestermedics/

Manchester Medics RUFC is an English rugby union club based in Manchester, which currently plays in the Counties 4 ADM Lancashire & Cheshire for the 2022-23 season.

The club is formed primarily by medical students from the University of Manchester, but a number of doctors and non-medical students are also involved.

It is one of the largest, most successful and social societies within the medical school. The 1st XV regularly plays on Saturdays, as well as a competitive "pre-clinical XV" playing midweek in a North West Universities development league. The club has enjoyed considerable past success, most notably being crowned NAMS champions for the 2014-2015 and 2018-19 seasons.

== Club honours ==
- National Association of Medical Schools Rugby Cup winners: 2014-15, 2018-19
- National Association of Medical Schools Rugby Cup runners up: 2005–06, 2025-26
- National Association of Medical Schools Rugby Plate winners: 2008–09
- University of Manchester Campus League champions (3): 2008–09, 2009–10, 2010–11
- War of the Roses winners (4): 2011–12, 2013–14, 2014–15, 2015–16, 2019-20
- North Lancashire 2 champions: 2011–12
- South Lancs/Cheshire 3 champions: 2012–13
- South Lancs/Cheshire 2 champions: 2013–14
- Cheshire (South) champions: 2015–16
