= Iain Coyle =

British comedian

- Born: 9 January 1968 (age 58); Burscough, Lancashire, England
- Notable work: So Graham Norton; Shooting Stars; Big Brother's Big Mouth

Comedy career
- Years active: 1990s–present
- Genres: TV producer and presenter, stand up comedy, comedy writer

Iain Coyle (born 9 January 1968 in Burscough, Lancashire) is a British TV presenter and producer and comedian. He was educated at St Bede's RC Comprehensive, St John Rigby College, Wigan, and Sheffield Polytechnic where he studied Fine Art.

== Broadcasting career ==
Iain has juggled presenting, writing, producing and formatting various television and radio projects, as well as heading the development departments at Cactus TV, Channel X and Hat Trick Productions, where he has devised and produced. His most recent projects has been producing Big Brother's Big Mouth and The Games on Channel 4, and now exec producing Sky One's forthcoming Premiership All Stars. He recently devised all the games and pranks on Celebrity Big Brother for Endemol UK and even found himself interviewing contestants from the ‘diary room'.

Iain has written for a broad range of comedy and entertainment shows including Vic and Bob's Shooting Stars & Families at War, Clive Anderson's If I Ruled the World, Alan Davies' pan-European One for the Road and Rowland Rivron's Bite the Bullet. He also had a hand in many other successful productions like Phil Kay Feels, So Graham Norton and game shows Dating Hell, Incognito, Food Fight and The Waiting Game.

Iain wrote and presented over 50 episodes of Funny Business, ITV's weekly late night comedy magazine show, he was a roving reporter on Channel 4's Last Chance Lottery, a celebrity film interviewer on both Moviewatch and This Morning. He also co-presented One Night Stand, LWT's late night entertainment show with Gail Porter, and was the comedy advisor on ITV's primetime talent show Give Your Mate a Break and the consumer reporter on ITV's We Can Work It Out.

Recently broadcast material on the Paramount Comedy Channel include Iain's interviews with Peter Kay (Peter Kay - The Early Years) and Little Britain's Matt Lucas and David Walliams (Lucas & Walliams - The Early Years).

Iain has also been the host of Not Just a Matter of Life and Death – The Liverpool Podcast for more than 65 episodes since 2009.
