= Burnley RUFC =

English rugby union club, based in Burnley, Lancashire

(England) Burnley
- Full name: Burnley Rugby Union Football Club
- Union: Lancashire RFU
- Founded: 1926; 100 years ago (as Calder Vale)
- Location: Burnley, Lancashire, England
- Ground: Holden Road
- Chairman: Peter Allen
- President: John Hutchinson
- Coach: James Bramhall
- Captain: Jack Thomas
Team kit

Official website
- www.pitchero.com/clubs/burnleyrugbyclub

Burnley Rugby Union Football Club (Burnley RUFC) is a rugby union club that currently plays in the South Lancs/Cheshire 2 league (the 9th tier of the English rugby union system) following their relegation from North Lancashire/Cumbria at the end of the 2017–18 season. The club was founded in 1926 as Calder Vale Rugby Club but the 2002 - 03 season saw the name of 75 years changed to help raise Burnley's rugby profile locally and beyond. The club plays from Holden Road, the site of Belvedere and Calder Vale Sports Club in the Reedley area of Burnley. The club's motto is "Nil Nisi Optimum Sufficiet" (Latin for: "Nothing But the Best Will Do").

== History ==
=== Early ===
There is a record of a rugby club in Burnley in 1880, the club named Burnley Rovers one of the earliest clubs in the country, later to become Burnley Football Club in 1882

Calder Vale Rugby Club played their first match against a Blackburn XV on Saturday November 29, 1926 at Cockshot Farm, Simonstone. It was won 19 - 3. [5 tries and a drop goal worth 4 points]

In 1985, the first experimental RFU league structure -the Girobank League- was set up in the North West of England and Calder Vale was involved.

=== Recent ===
Burnley were Team of the Month for the October 2002 Rugby World Magazine after a series of victories over Heaton Moor, Lytham and Carnforth. In 2006 a memorable tour took place to China with matches played in Hong Kong and Ghanzou. Included in this trip was an extra event in the shape of a typhoon! In the 2007 - 08 season Burnley won the league play-off against Netherall 20 - 0 and promotion was won to the North Lancs/Cumbria league. The start of the 2008 - 09 season saw the award of the RFU's Seal of Approval to the Club which was presented at a pre-match lunch by Burnley's then M.P. Kitty Ussher. Also in 2008, the club was shocked to learn of the untimely death of Fred Picton-Turbervill at his home in South Africa. He captained 1st XV from 1984 to 1986 and played for the club until 1992. Despite finishing last in the North Lancs/Cumbria league in 2009 Burnley were not relegated.

Burnley currently field three senior sides, with the 1st XV currently competing in the North Lancs 1 league, and the 2nd and 3rd XVs playing in the Salford University League, along with a thriving junior section with teams at most age groups from under 7s right through to under 16s. The club keeps strong community ties and works with local schools, colleges and community groups.

Season	League	Finish position	Points
05-06	North Lancs 1	5th/11	24
06-07	North Lancs 1	7th/12	20
07-08	North Lancs 1	2nd/12	36
08-09	North Lancs / Cumbria	12th/12	6
09-10	North Lancs / Cumbria	11th/12	4

== Honours ==
1st XV:

- North-West East 2 champions: 1990–91 (Note: North-West East 2 title was won when club was known as Calder Vale.)
- Cumbria v Lancashire (North) promotion playoff winners (2): 2007–08, 2016–17

2nd XV:

- Halbro Plate winners 2013
