= Broughton RUFC =

English rugby union club, based in Salford, Greater Manchester

Broughton Rugby Club
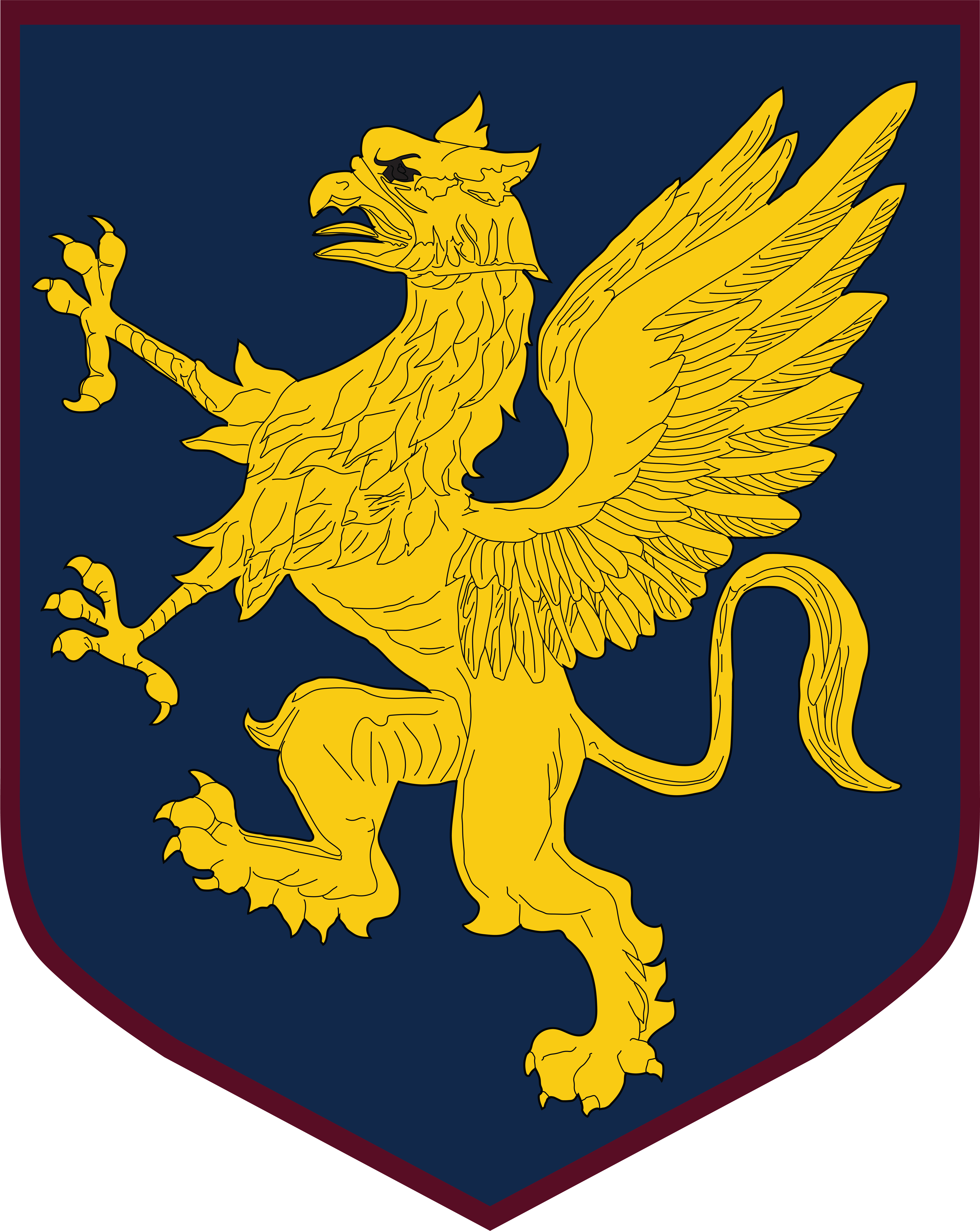
- Full name: Broughton Rugby Union Football Club
- Union: Lancashire RFU
- Nickname(s): Broughton Griffins formerly Broughton Wasps
- Founded: 1869; 157 years ago
- Location: Salford, Greater Manchester, England
- Ground(s): Broughton Cricket & Rugby Club, Yew Street, Salford
- Chairman: Craig Barnes
- Coach: Brian Collier
- Captain: Craig Collier
- League: Halbro North West Leagues Division 4 East

Official website
- broughtonrufc.rfu.club

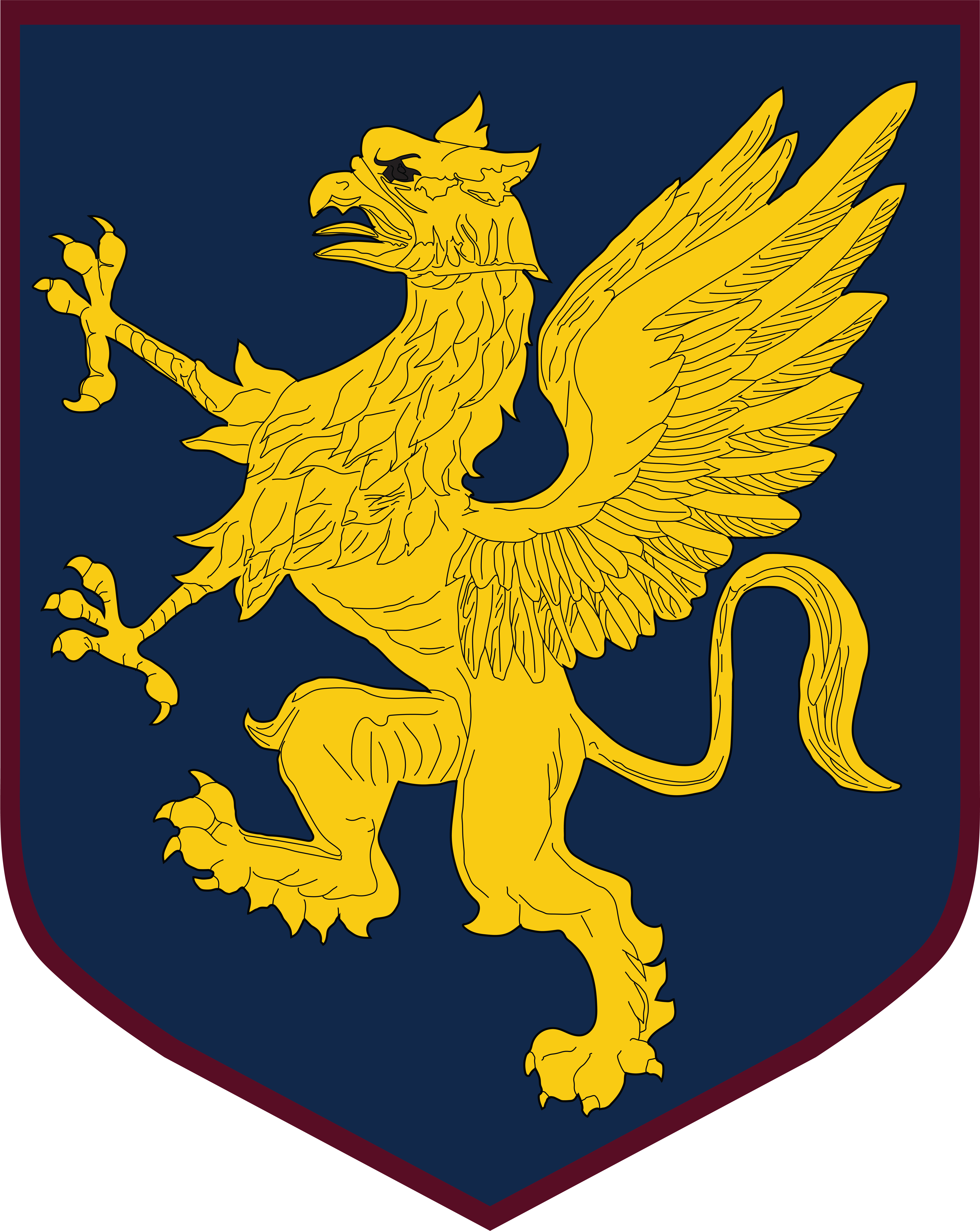
The Broughton badge was updated for the 2019/2020 season, returning to a griffin instead of the lion that had been used over several seasons. The new badge is based on an original plaque for the Broughton Cricket Club that hangs in the club house

Old club badge featuring a lion

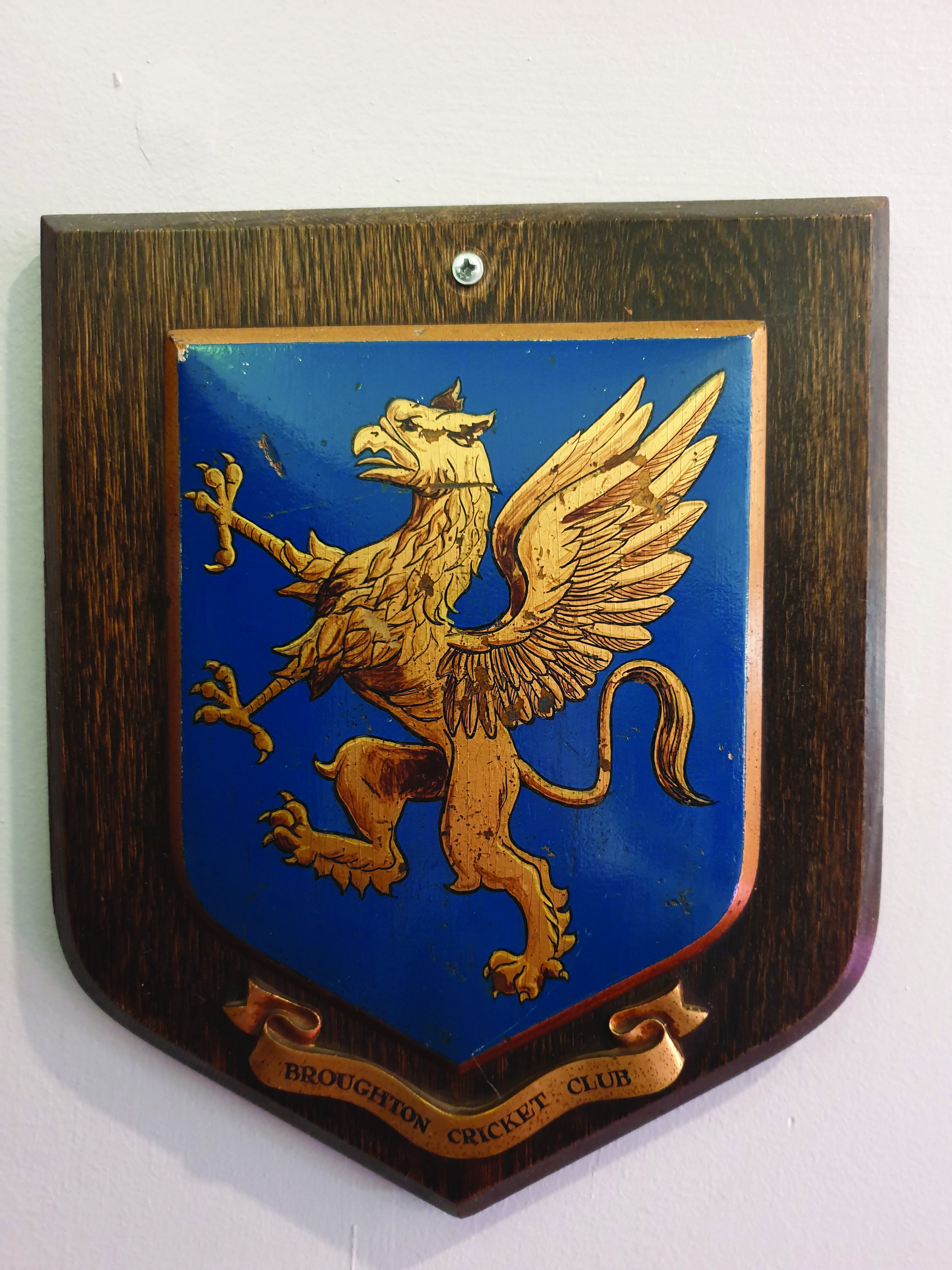
Broughton Cricket Club plaque that hangs in the clubhouse. The 2019/20 badge is based on this plaque

Broughton Rugby Union Football Club is a rugby union club based in Salford, Greater Manchester, which at the time of the club's founding in 1869 was in Lancashire, England. Its home venue is the Broughton Cricket & Rugby Club pitch on Yew Street. Broughton, although it currently occupies a low position in the English rugby union league system, is notable for its early important contributions to the development of rugby union most predominantly in the north of England, but also nationally. Broughton also hosted the first ever rugby match played under floodlights.

== History ==
Broughton was the first Broughton football club in Manchester, founded by members of a club known in 1869 as Broughton College, formed from former pupils of Broughton College, a public school in Salford at the time. Its foundation in 1869 predates both the formation of Broughton Rangers (1877) and Broughton Park RUFC (1882). After playing two or three seasons on the Broughton Cricket Ground they changed their appellation to the Broughton Wasps, and soon played some of the strongest teams in the North. In 1877, the same year that Broughton Rangers were formed, the Wasps amalgamated with another Broughton club known as Wellington, who it is reported "were the first club to introduce the passing game into Lancashire, and brought it to such perfection, that, in spite of their youth, they succeeded in beating many of the principal clubs of the district.".

=== Lancashire Football Union ===
Broughton also played a pivotal role in the formation of the Lancashire Football Union (later to be called the Lancashire County Rugby Football Union). From 1870 to 1881 the government and arrangement of county matches in Lancashire had been vested in Manchester Football Club. Though self-appointed, Manchester was recognised as the authority by the other great Lancashire club, Liverpool. However, a movement of emerging new clubs, headed by W. Bell, the honorary secretary of the Broughton Football Club, had an objective to secure a voice in the selection of county teams. In 1881 a general meeting of Lancashire clubs was called at which the following clubs were represented: Manchester Rangers; Free Wanderers; Broughton; Swinton; Walton; Rossendale; Oldham; Manchester Athletic; Rochdale Hornets; Chorley Birch; and Cheetham and a resolution to form the Lancashire Football Union was agreed. The initial committee had W. Bell as its honorary secretary and G. C. Lindsay as the honorary treasurer. Two county matches were arranged altogether versus the Midland Counties and Lanarkshire (Scotland). Manchester then decided to wrest control of the county back, and on 22 December 1881 met with the new Union and a duly constituted and representative governing body, its club to be called The Lancashire County Football Club, was formed. Although the president, vice-presidents, the hon. secretary and treasurer were elected from the Manchester Football Club and the Liverpool Club, Broughton was represented by Bell on the committee.

=== The first floodlit match ===
Prior to the events leading to the formation of the Lancashire Union, Broughton was also the home side in the first rugby match under floodlights when they played Swinton in Salford on 22 October 1878. The match took place at Broughton's Yew Street ground in Salford and the floodlights used were two Gramme's lights, suspended from 30 feet poles. The match was comprehensively won by Broughton by two-goals, three tries, and three touchdowns to Swinton's none. A report in the Salford Weekly News dated 2 November 1878, provided some details of the match: "C.Sawyer kicked one of the goals from the field of play. Mudie the other from a fine try by J.Sawyer, while the three unsuccessful tries were secured by Riley, A.Bowam and Shut". The report went on to detail that probably "8,000 to 10,000 persons were present when the time for kick-off arrived". Following the Broughton experiment with lights another match took place in Liverpool later that month under floodlights and very soon the practice became popular as the electric companies attempted to overturn the monopoly exercised by the gas companies.

=== Later history ===
In the 1880s Broughton began to produce some players of international standing including Charles Montague Sawyer, John Henry Payne, and Frank Moss.

=== 2015/2016 Season (Raging Bull Division 5 East) ===
Joe Kennedy captained the team this season with Mike Moran as vice captain. and they finished in 2nd place, just behind rivals Didsbury Toc H 3rds. The team started the season strongly, winning 8/8 games but there was confusion mid season when the league organisers reset the league and stronger opponents were introduced into the league. The team were able to overcome the challenges that this caused. The team worked closely with The University of Salford during this season and used several students during the season as players

2nd place, promoted to Raging Bull Division 4 East

==== 2015/2016 Squad (incomplete) ====
===== Forwards =====
Kade Backhouse, Laurence Douglas, Javier Galacho, Jack Jones, Mark Jones, Nick Jones, Joe Kennedy, Richard Ker, Ian Mac, Michael Moran, Henry Roberts, Jack Rodgers, Chris Shotton, Ryan Snape, Karl Stotty, Liam Whittaker

===== Backs =====
Reece Bottomley, Scott Davies, Simon Hindle, Richard Hutchins, Jon Kelly, Jonny Owen, Jamie Parker, Ryan Smyth, Jack Starr, Dom West, Frazer Worthington

=== 2016/2017 Season (Raging Bull Division 4 East) ===
Having been promoted few could have predicted the season that was to come. Strong numbers in preseason gave the team confidence going into the season, a more structured approach with big numbers meant that the team was well prepared. Club captain was Jordan Parker. It was hoped that a 2nd team would join a lower league but numbers meant that plans for this were shelved. The team reached the final of the Raging Bull shield but failed at the last hurdle to a very strong Heaton Moor 2nd team (a team that looked unrecognisable from the one that Broughton had previously beaten twice in the league and it was evident that Heaton Moor had put their 1st team out against Broughton. In the league Broughton became Division 4 East Champions and lost only 1 game during the season.

1st place P-13 W-12 D-0 L-0 Wo-1 F-571 A-103 +/- +468 Pts-52

League Champions, promoted to Sale Sharks Division 3 North

==== 2016/2017 Squad ====
===== Forwards =====
Ray Ashton, Kade Backhouse, Chris Brooker, Laurence Douglas, Jack Jones, Mark Jones, Nick Jones, Joe Kennedy, Richard Ker, Jordan Little, Michael Moran, Joshua Musk, Henry Roberts, Chris Shotton, Karl Stotty, Heleno Teixeira, Liam Whittaker

===== Backs =====
Reece Bottomley, Scott Davies, Kieran Fee, Mike Greensmith, Richard Hutchins, Jon Kelly, Alex McEwen, Jonny Owen, Jamie Parker, Jordan Parker, Ryan Smyth, Jack Starr, Harry James Warburton, Frazer Worthington

=== 2017/2018 Season (Sale Sharks Division 3 North) ===
A newly promoted Broughton side looked to build on a nearly perfect, almost unbeaten season but the team knew that it was not going to be easy and the main focus was to compete and finish the season in a respectable position. Jordan Parker retained his place as captain with Jack Jones and Kade Backhouse coming in as vice captains. Broughton had struggled for numbers in preseason (perhaps a hangover from the previous season) and were often struggling for a full complement of players at game time, sometimes finishing games with 13 or 14 players on the pitch. Despite the problems and almost using their entire complement of allowed cancellations, the team finished in a respectable sixth position out of 12 teams (2 teams had folded and not completed the season: Carnforth and North West Mercenaries).

6th place - P-22 W-11 D-0 L-11 F-437 A-436 +/- +1 pts-52

==== 2017/2018 Squad ====
===== Forwards =====
Ray Ashton, Kade Backhouse, Craig Barnes, Chris Brooker, Pete Chamberlain, Laurence Douglas, George Edwards, James Oogle, Jack Jones, Mark Jones, Nick Jones, Joe Kennedy, Richard Ker, Jordan Little, Michael Moran, Josh Musk, Henry Roberts, Chris Shotton, Karl Stotty, Liam Whittaker

===== Backs =====
Reece Bottomley, Zak Brooker, Scott Davies, Kieran Fee, Dave Galbraith, Mike Greensmith, Richard Hutchins, Patrick Koumou, Brad Mcdonagh, Alex McEwen, Jonny Owen, Jamie Parker, Jordan Parker, Jack Starr, Frazer Worthington

=== 2018/2019 Season (Sale Sharks Division 3 North) ===
Team captain for this season was Kade Backhouse along with vice captain James Ogle (New Zealand). The team returned to playing in maroon, blue and gold with a heraldic lion on the badge, the new kit was made by Teejac. A promising preseason and a strong start suggested that Broughton would go on to finish their second season in division 3 north in a good position. However, dwindling numbers at training and showing up to games with scratch sides meant they would be dumped out of the cup in their first game and struggle to complete the full season. The team still had plenty of talented players and some promise, this attracted the attention of Brian Collier and, for first time in a few years, Broughton now had a coaching setup to help build and attract numbers. Towards the end of the season the team fought back from the drop zone to avoid relegation. This was thanks to the new coaching setup and new talent coming in. When numbers were low the team was also helped out by former captain Joe Kennedy, who returned for a few games towards the end of the season.

9th place - P-24 W-8 D-0 L-16 F-494 A-797 +/- -303 LB-2 pts-49

==== 2018/2019 Squad ====
===== Forwards =====
Ray Ashton, Kade Backhouse, Craig Barnes, Chris Brooker, Stephen Butler, Craig Collier, Stuart Cork, Pete Chamberlain, Scott Davies, Jack Hussey, Jack Jones, Nick Jones, Joe Kennedy, Richard Ker, Michael Moran, Josh Musk (Tiger Hawkwind), James Ogle, Sam Randell, Lloyd Thomas, Liam Whittaker, Iwan Williams,

===== Backs =====
Jordan Banfield, Joshua Blammon, Ian Donegan, Dave Galbraith, Jake Hunter, Patrick Koumou, Alex McEwen, Sam Mills, Jonny Owen, Jamie Parker, Jordan Parker, Joel Richards, Josh Salmon, Keenan Sheffield, Ryan Smyth, Rees Stringer

====== Tour ======
The team took a tour to South Wales at the end of the season, playing against St. Peters RFC in Roath, Cardiff. The team also attended the Wales / England warm up game for the 2019 World Cup.

=== 2019/2020 Season (Sale Sharks Division 3 North) ===
==== PreSeason ====
During preseason Broughton defeated Oldhams' 2nd team, a team that had just been promoted to division 2 and that had beaten Broughton twice in the previous season. Broughton played the first 20 minutes with a strong 1st team and then played the following 40 minutes with their 2nd team, reverting to the 1st team for the final 20 minutes. Following this win Broughton took a severely depleted team to Rochdale and were comprehensively beaten by Rochdale's 2nd team, a team that plays in Sale Sharks Division 1. Rochdale showed little respect to the visitors. Preseason finished off at an international tournament at Preston Grasshoppers where Broughton played against Dendermonde Rugby Club and Preston Grasshoppers 3rd team. Broughton lost both games but were showing real promise in their new play-style, dominating in the forwards, especially at scrum time but just lacking enough in the back-line to finish things off.

===== Season =====
Broughton RUFC started this season in the Sale Sharks Division 3 North, having narrowly missed out on relegation. The club strip was updated, retaining the same colours. A new badge was created and changed from the lion back to a griffin. This season also saw the introduction of a Broughton 2nd team, the first time in 8 years that this happened. The increase in playing numbers has been attributed to the arrival of coach Brian Collier, who has transformed training sessions and allowed the team to look forward with increased ambitions, hoping to move into an RFU league and gain accreditation. This season saw Kade Backhouse as club captain, Jordan Parker as playing captain of the 1st team and Stephen Butler as 2nd team captain.

Despite the season coming to a close earlier than expected, this was an excellent season for Broughton RUFC. The team finished the season at the top of the table, recording key wins over Preston Grasshoppers 3rds, Wigan 2nds, and Blackpool. 13 teams started the league with one team that folded and did not complete the season: Thornton Cleveleys 2nd XV.

1st place - P-18 W-15 D-0 L-3 pts-80

The newly formed Broughton 2nd XV finished their debut season in 11th place. The league featured several strong opponents, providing competitive experience for the squad. The season served as a foundation for further development.

11th place - P20 W6 D1 L13 pts-43

==== 2019/2020 season squad ====
===== Coach =====
Brian Collier

===== Forwards =====
Jonny Appleby, Kade Backhouse, Craig Barnes, Andy Bowen, Chris Brooker, Stephen Butler, Craig Collier, Stuart Cork, Sam Donley, Callum Ellis, Kieran Evans, Dave Galbraith, Callum Hulston, Jack Hussey, Kevin Iles, Richard Ker, Alex McCay, Jono Mitchell, Michael Moran, Sam Randell, Jack Ryan, Lloyd Thomas, Liam Whittaker, Iwan Williams

===== Backs =====
Jordan Banfield, Joshua Blammon, Ant Butterworth, Dylan Currie, Luke Ellis, George Galbraith, Mike Greensmith, Patrick Koumou, Alex McEwen, Sam Mills, Jonny Owen, Jamie Parker, Jordan Parker, Joel Richards, Josh Salmon, Ryan Smyth, Jack Starr, Rees Stringer, Brian Thokoza, Ryan Tyrer, Josh Webb.

=== 2020/2021 Season (ADM Division 1) ===
==== PreSeason ====
Broughton RUFC announced their application to the RFU ADM Division 1 was accepted for the 2020/21 season. Alongside this, the Broughton 2nd XV announced they would be participating in the RFU ADM Division 2 going in to the 2020/21 season. The captains for both sides for the forthcoming season were announced to be Jordan Parker (captain) and Craig Collier (vice captain) for the 1st XV, and Stephen Butler (captain) and Dan Doorbar (vice captain) for the Broughton 2nd XV.

==== 2020/2021 season squad ====
===== Coach =====
Brian Collier

===== Forwards =====
TBC

===== Backs =====
TBC

== Honours ==
- North-West East 2 champions: 1988–89

== Notable former players ==
- Charles Montague Sawyer (first capped 1880)
- John Henry Payne (first capped 1882)
- Frank Moss (first capped 1885)
