= Hoylake RFC =

Rugby union team in Merseyside, England

Coordinates: 53.3925308°N 3.1732465°W

(England) Hoylake
- Full name: Hoylake Rugby Club
- Union: Cheshire RFU
- Nickname: The Gulls
- Founded: 1922; 104 years ago
- Location: Hoylake, Merseyside, England
- Ground: Carham Road
- Chairman: Darren Agnew
- Coach: Oliver Cook
- League: Counties 3 ADM Lancashire & Cheshire

Official website
- www.hoylakerfc.com

Hoylake Rugby Club is an English rugby union club which play in the Counties 3 ADM Lancashire & Cheshire league, the ninth tier of English rugby. Their home ground is Carham Road in Hoylake on the Wirral Peninsula.

As well as adult rugby, the club also has mini and junior teams, plus women's and girls' teams, too.

James Bond actor Daniel Craig grew up in Hoylake and played rugby at Hoylake rugby club.

In July 2021, players from Hoylake Rugby Club set a Guinness World Record for the longest game of rugby. Held in memory of Dan Miller, a former player who died aged 43, the record attempt was held to raise money for the charity WaterAid. Twenty-eight players set a world record by playing for 33 hours 33 mins and 33 seconds, raising over £17,000 in the process.
