= Chorley RUFC =

English rugby union club

(England) Chorley
- Full name: Chorley Rugby Union Football Club
- Union: Lancashire RFU
- Founded: 1973; 53 years ago
- Location: Chorley, Lancashire, England
- Ground(s): Brookfields Playing Fields, Chorley
- Chairman: Ellery Hodson
- Coach: Graham Crane
- Captain: Chris Highton
- League: North Lancashire 2
Team kit

Official website
- www.chorleyrugby.co.uk

Chorley Rugby Union Club was an English rugby union club based in Chorley, Lancashire. The club no longer fields any rugby teams and seems to have folded. The club emblem is derived from the Chorley Borough coat of arms and the team colours are Black and White hoops.

For up to date training information please see the clubs social media pages.

== History ==
Chorley RUFC was founded in 1973 and initially played their matches on the playing fields of Astley Park. In 1981 the club moved to its own ground at Chancery Road, which remains the club's current location.
