= North Manchester RUFC =

English rugby union club, based in Moston, Greater Manchester

Coordinates: 53.52596°N 2.176949°W

North Manchester Rugby Club
- Full name: North Manchester Rugby Union Football Club
- Union: Lancashire RFU
- Nickname: T'North
- Founded: 1921; 105 years ago (as Prestwich RUFC)
- Location: Moston Manchester, England
- Ground(s): The Tudor Lodge Playing Fields, Victoria Avenue East, M40 5SH (Capacity: 250)
- Chairman: Philip Pugh
- President: John Greenwood
- Coach(es): Andrew Donley (Head), Gary Pugh (Forwards)
- Captain(s): Michael Moore, Lewis Barnes (Vice-Captain)

Official website
- www.northmanchesterrufc.co.uk

North Manchester Rugby Club (aka North Manchester RUFC) is an amateur sports club situated 5 miles north of the centre of Manchester. It is the only rugby union club within the city of Manchester, north of the centre.

== Club Honours ==
- North Lancashire Division 2 champions: 2013–14

== Club Kit ==
1st XV Kit
Period	Brand	Main Shirt Sponsor (Front)
1921/2017	No Brand	Varied
2017/18	No Brand	LACA Transport
2018/19	No Brand	LACA Transport
2019/20	Teejac	Search
2020/21	Teejac	Greengate Metals
2021/22	Teejac	Greengate Metals
2022/23	Teejac	Greengate Metals
2023/24	Teejac	Greengate Metals
2024/25	O'Neills	BDSS LTD Traffic Management Services
2025/26	O'Neills	Trentlodge Ltd Groundworks

== Season Summaries ==
1st XV
League	League Position	P	W	D	L	PF	PA	+/-	TB	LB	Points
1998/1999 North Lancashire Division 2	3	12	9	0	3	307	139	168	0	0	14
1999/2000 North Lancashire Division 2	2	12	9	0	3	342	108	234	0	0	18
2000/2001 North Lancashire Division 2	5	15	8	1	6	289	250	39	0	0	17
2001/2002 North Lancashire Division 2	9	18	4	0	14	170	457	-287	0	0	8
2002/2003 North Lancashire Division 2	5	14	6	0	8	214	364	-150	0	0	12
2007/2008 North Lancashire Division 2	6	19	6	1	12	289	335	-46	0	0	11
2008/2009 North Lancashire Division 2	6	17	9	0	8	321	351	-30	0	0	18
2009/2010 North Lancashire Division 2	6	19	10	0	9	420	347	73	0	0	20
2010/2011 North Lancashire Division 2	2	20	15	0	5	597	255	342	12	3	75
2011/2012 North Lancashire Division 1	11	26	9	2	15	359	572	-213	1	3	44
2012/2013 North Lancashire Division 1	11	21	4	0	17	211	767	-556	1	2	4
2013/2014 Lancashire Division 2	1	21	20	1	0	756	154	602	15	0	97
2014/2015 North Lancashire Division 1	10	20	3	0	17	171	711	-540	2	0	14
2015/2016 Lancashire (North)	11	26	6	0	20	230	1010	-780	2	3	20
2016/2017 Lancashire (North)	9	20	7	0	13	361	509	-148	6	6	30
2017/2018 Lancs/Cheshire Division Three (North)	6	13	6	0	7	193	315	-122	2	3	29
2017/2018 Lancs/Cheshire Division Three (League Cup)	7	7	3	0	4	172	137	35	3	2	12
2018/2019 ADM First Division	6	18	6	0	12	274	517	-243	4	1	30
2021/2022 ADM Division 1	11	18	1	0	17	114	383	-269	0	1	5
2022/2023 Counties 4 ADM Lancashire & Cheshire	9	18	2	0	16	178	615	-437	2	1	-13
2023/2024 NOWIRUL Division 3 Central	4	18	12	0	6	509	380	129	0	1	67
2024/2025 NOWIRUL Division 3 Central	6	20	10	2	8	482	510	-28	0	1	64

2nd XV
League	League Position	P	W	D	L	PF	PA	+/-	TB	LB	Points
2010/2011 NOWIRUL Division 5 East	2	24	16	0	8	825	433	392	0	0	72
2011/2012 NOWIRUL Division 5 East	3	22	14	1	7	617	495	122	0	0	65
2012/2013 NOWIRUL Division 4 East	10	20	5	1	14	343	629	-286	0	0	29
2013/2014 NOWIRUL Division 4 East	9	24	11	1	12	589	602	-13	0	0	58
2014/2015 NOWIRUL Division 4 East	9	24	11	0	13	586	718	-132	0	0	56
2015/2016 NOWIRUL Division 4 East	9	22	8	1	13	405	463	-58	0	0	45
2016/2017 NOWIRUL Division 4 East	9	22	8	0	14	472	717	-245	0	0	48
2018/2019 NOWIRUL Division 5 East	5	16	10	0	6	552	400	152	0	0	39
2021/2022 NOWIRUL Division 5 East	7	16	9	0	7	387	320	67	0	0	39

== Playing Squad ==
2025/2026
Name	Nickname	Position	Nationality
Matt Bramwell		Front Row	English
Dan Park		Prop	English
Ben Ramsden	Dave	Hooker	English
Nathan Smith		Front Row	English
Craig Brady	Ace	Second Row	English
Lewis Barnes (Vice-Captain)	Big Lew	Second Row	Irish
Callum Davies	Kenny	Second Row	English
Ben Taylor	Pushback	Second Row	English
Tom Bennet		Flanker	English
Blaine Brady	Braine	Flanker	Irish
Luke Bromby	Messi	Flanker	English
Lewis Higgins		Flanker	English
Mark Prescott	Smithy	Flanker	English
Colin Robinson	Verne	Flanker	English
Mike Moore (Captain)		8	English
Scott Danby	Uncle Scott	Fly-Half	English
Pete Davies		Fly-Half / Centre	English
Mason Barnes	Boy	Winger	Irish
Curtis Harvey	Crut	Fullback	English
Joe Steele	Welsh Dave / Taff	Winger	Welsh
Matt Wilson	Ritchie Pillock	Winger	English
Mark Large	Large Mark	Fly Half	English
Rio Roberts		Winger	English
John Brand	Melman	Winger	English
Nate Capps	Bronson	Winger	English
Liam Webster		Scrum-Half	English
Sam Donley		Prop	English
Kiefer Power		Winger	English
Rhys Somers		Second Row	Welsh
Roy Maganga		Winger	Zimbabwean
Andrea Banda		Center	Zimbabwean
Ethan Rigney	Gayeman	Winger	English

== Club History ==
=== Prestwich RFC (1921-1951) ===
Prestwich Rugby Union Football Club was founded in 1921, and during the 1930's rented two fields from Waterdale Dyeing and Finishing Company Ltd. and built a pavilion. The teams (they managed to raise 3) had a long, uphill walk back home after their matches.

There is not much written history of the club at this point in time.

Club Location to 1951: (53°31'35.3"N 2°18'28.9"W)

=== Prestwich and Middleton RUFC (1951-1985) ===
In 1951, the club left its roots in Prestwich and began a new chapter as Prestwich & Middleton Rugby Union Football Club. What stood before them was little more than a bare shell of a clubhouse — but over the next five years, through the hard work and goodwill of members, relatives, and friends, it was slowly transformed into a true home for rugby and camaraderie.

The early 1980s brought darker days. By 1981, the club was struggling to survive amid a harsh economic climate. Spiralling council rates, dwindling membership — with only two teams left — and damage to the unfenced playing fields all took their toll. For a time, it seemed the club might fade into history.

Then, in 1983, another challenge arose. Rochdale Council decided that the land the club occupied would be redeveloped for housing. Once again, Prestwich & Middleton were forced to seek a new home. An initial proposal — a 14-acre site between Alkrington Hall Road and Kings Drive — offered hope, but the wet, poorly drained ground proved unsuitable. Undeterred, the club looked further afield, determined to find a place where its story could continue.

Club Location 1951-1985: (53°32'43.7"N 2°13'20.4"W)

=== North Manchester RUFC (1985-Present) ===
==== 1985 – A New Era Begins ====
In 1985, the landscape of English rugby changed forever with the creation of the Northern Division Rugby Union League — the first official league system in Britain. For North Manchester Rugby Union Football Club, it marked the start of a bold new chapter. With a new home, new players, and now a place in organised competition, North were placed in the East Division Two, facing the likes of Alsager College, Ashton-on-Mersey, Ashton-under-Lyne, Bowdon, Broughton, Bury, Manchester YMCA, Metrovic, Old Bedians, and Toc H.

==== 1986–1987 – Growth and Grit ====
The following seasons brought steady progress, with North Manchester proudly fielding three teams — a testament to the club’s growing strength and spirit.

==== 1990 – United Strength ====
In 1990, North Manchester merged with Oldham Colleges RUFC, continuing to field three senior teams and a veterans’ side. The new partnership expanded the club’s fixture list, taking them from the North Midlands to Cumbria and across to the Fylde Coast and North Yorkshire.

==== 1991 – The M60 Arrives ====
Just a year later, the club faced another setback as half its land was claimed through compulsory purchase for the construction of the M60 motorway. Despite this, the remaining pitches continued to host matches right up until building work began.

==== 1996 – Losing Ground ====
Further challenges came in 1996, when the Co-operative Wholesale Society (CWS) submitted plans to develop the club’s site. Although the proposal was scaled back to cover only the western half, it was a heavy blow. Around this time, the club also dropped from three teams to two, as player availability began to wane.

==== 2003–2007 – The Struggles ====
The early 2000s proved testing. North Manchester were reduced to a single team and slipped into the intermediate leagues, at times struggling to field even a bare fifteen. Yet the club’s resolve never faltered.

==== 2008–2010 – The Resurgence ====
Determination paid off. North began to rediscover their form, finishing mid-table in 2009 and 2010 before an impressive surge saw them finish second in the North Lancs 2 League — earning promotion to North Lancs 1.

==== 2011–2013 – Tough Seasons ====
Life in North Lancs 1 proved difficult, with the club unable to rise above 11th place and eventually being relegated back to Lancashire Division 2.

==== 2013–2014 – The Season to Remember ====
Then came the season. Twenty wins, one draw (we don’t talk about that one), and no losses — a record that still brings a smile to all who were there.

==== 2014–2019 – The Shifting Leagues ====
Over the next few years, the RFU restructured the leagues several times. Through all the changes, North Manchester held their own, finishing mid-table on average. Between 2010 and 2019, the club was once again fielding a second XV — and came close to running a third.

==== 2019–2022 – The Struggles, Part II ====
The years that followed brought familiar hardship. Injuries and retirements hit hard — and then came Covid. The pandemic took its toll across all levels of rugby, and North Manchester was no exception. Players moved on, some gave up the game entirely, others even left the country. Results suffered, confidence dipped, and the club dropped once again into the intermediate leagues — not for lack of numbers, but because the standard of rugby simply could not be maintained.

==== 2022-Present - The Rebuild ====
The challenges of the past — from lost land and league demotions to economic hardship and pandemic silence — have only strengthened the club’s character. Every tackle, every try, every pint raised in the bar is a reminder of how far the club has come, and how much it means to all who call it home.

The journey continues — built on history, fuelled by pride, and carried forward by every player, volunteer, and supporter who wears the badge of North Manchester RUFC.

Club Location 1985-Present: (53°31'35.2"N 2°10'38.6"W)
