= Southport RFC =

English rugby union club, based in Southport, Merseyside

- Full name: Southport Rugby Football Club
- Union: Lancashire RFU
- Founded: 1872; 154 years ago
- Location: Southport, Merseyside, England
- Ground: Waterloo Road (Capacity: 3,500)
- Chairman: John Vandermeer
- Director of Rugby: Mike Dale
- Coach: Darren Hall
- Captain: Gareth Lang
- League: Counties 2 adm Lancashire & Cheshire
- 2023 - 2024: 3rd
1st kit	2nd kit

Official website
- www.southportrfc.com

Southport Rugby Football Club is a rugby union club based in Southport, Merseyside, now playing their home matches at Waterloo Road in Hillside. The club participates in North 2 West.

== History ==
"Southport Football Club" was formed in November 1872, as a Rugby Club.

Dr. George Augustus Coombe, later Sir George Pilkington (House Surgeon and Medical Officer of Southport Hospital from 1870 to 1884) was the driving force behind the formation of the club, with the intention of "improving the physical development of our young townsmen".

Backing for the new venture also came from Southport Rowing Club and the Alexandra Cricket Club, the large field next to whose Club on Manchester Road would become Southport Football Club's first ground. From an OS map at the time the large field appears behind the Hartwood Road area with access off Roe Lane, It is now covered by housing on Melling Road, Irton Road and Grange Avenue.

The club's colours are recorded in Charles Alcock's Football Annual in 1874 as Black, Red and Amber.

When the Southport Visiter added a "sports and pastimes" section to the newspaper in 1875, it was a reflection that sport's popularity had been growing in the town.

In 1876 other teams sprang up playing 'the handling code' in the town, amongst whom the most notable were Southport Olympic and Southport Wasps. In the same year the Rugby Football Union changed the scoring mechanism. Scoring by points became the norm.

After 6 years of existence, forward G. Schofield became the first Southport player to be selected for the Lancashire county side, playing against Yorkshire at Whalley Range on 20 January. He also played in the North v South International Trial at Manchester. Scofield played in several Lancashire County matches and appeared in the Southport team photograph in his County jersey.

Around this time, and as older players began to retire, the club began to suffer through a lack of recruits. The Southport Olympic Rugby Club had by this time grown to be the premier Rugby club in the town with younger players choosing "Olympic" over the original Southport club.

After a particularly harsh winter in 1879 the original Southport Football Club failed to re-emerge for the new season.

Southport Wasps dropped the 'Wasps' suffix and played for a season as Southport Football Club, becoming the second club to play under the original name. They briefly switched to Red, White and Blue. The playing of Rugby was stopped altogether by the club in August 1880, leaving Southport Olympic as the town's remaining rugby club.

A number of the players to have either represented the original club, or Wasps, transferred their allegiances to Olympic, along with a number of supporters and key officials.

After a season's absence, in 1881, Southport Football Club was reformed for a second time, and the new club became the third to bear the name. A set of rugby fixtures was arranged for the 1881/82 season. After only three games however, the last of which being against Bootle on 29 October, fielding two men short and losing by one goal, eight tries and eleven minor points, the team switched to association football.

Southport Olympic continued to carry the Rugby torch in the town through to 1889. One year previously a professional association football club, Southport Central, had been formed and the town went association football crazy.

After a number of years of little or no rugby due to inter-club conflicts over professional versus amateur status (which led to a number of clubs breaking away to form the Northern Rugby Football Union (the Rugby Football League), Southport Olympic completely reformed at Victoria Park, Southport and rejoined the Lancashire County Rugby Football Union in 1906. In April 1913, a proposal to drop the Olympic name in favour of Southport Rugby Union Football Club was carried at a general meeting.

When Britain joined the First World War in September 1914, an extraordinary meeting of the club cancelled all fixtures and recommended that all members 'join some military organisation'. Fourteen club members lost their lives in the war, including the 1914 club captain J.E. Grimshaw, who was killed in the Gallipoli Campaign while serving with the Lancashire Fusiliers.

The club returned to playing fixtures in 1919, and by 1922 it had 75 players and 176 patrons. The year 1926 saw the start of the last season at Victoria Park, and on 26 March 1927 the club celebrated the opening of the new ground at Waterloo Road with a victory over Preston Grasshoppers.

Southport RFC's first XV currently plays in Counties 2 ADM Lancashire & Cheshire in the Rugby Football Union Northern Division, and the club fields many sides at all age levels.

- Senior: First XV, Second XV, Third XV, Ladies, U18 Colts
- Junior: U13s to U17 Colts
- Mini: U6s to U12s

== Club Honours ==
Senior: First XV

- South Lancs/Cheshire 2 champions: 1996–97
- North West 3 champions: 1997–98
- South Lancs/Cheshire 3 champions: 2006–07
- Merseyside (West) champions: 2015–16

Senior: Second XV

- North West League 4 (North) champions: 2011–12

Junior:

- U18: Lancashire Colts Cup champions (2): 1972–73, 2018–19, North West Conference C champions: 2019–20, North West Conference D Champions 2025–26.
- U17: RFU U17 National Plate champions: 2016–17, North West Conference C champions: 2011–12, North West Conference B champions: 2016–17, North West Conference D champions: 2019–20
- U16: Lancashire Cup champions: 2016–17
- U15: Lancashire Bowl champions: 2023–24
- U15: Lancashire Bowl champions: 2009–10
- U14: Lancashire Plate champions: 2013–14
- U13: Lancashire Plate champions: 2012–13
