= Heaton Moor RUFC =

English rugby union club, based in Stockport, Lancashire

(England) Heaton Moor
- Full name: Heaton Moor Rugby Union Football Club
- Union: Lancashire RFU
- Founded: 1899; 127 years ago
- Location: Heaton Moor, Stockport, Greater Manchester, England
- Ground: Green Lane
- Chairman: Mark Ruby
- President: Tony Murton
- Coach: Wynand Van Zyl
- Captain: Jack Fitzwiliam-Pipe
- League: ADM Lancashire leagues, Championship
- 2019-20: 11th (Premier Division)

Official website
- www.pitchero.com/clubs/heatonmoor

Heaton Moor RUFC is a Rugby union football club, based in Stockport in the North West of England. The club was formed in 1899. The home ground of Heaton Moor is The Heaton's Sports Club situated on Green Lane, in the village of Heaton Moor, Stockport. The club plays in the ADM Lancashire Rugby Union Leagues, Championship Division.

== Club honours ==
- Lancashire North 2 champions: 1993–94
- North Lancs 1 champions (2): 2004–05, 2007–08
- Lancashire Senior Colts Cup winners 2017-18
