= North West 3 =

English rugby union league

- Sport: Rugby Union
- Instituted: 1996; 30 years ago
- Ceased: 2000; 26 years ago
- Country: England
- Website: clubs.rfu.com

North West 3 was an English Rugby Union league which was at the ninth tier of the domestic competition and was available to teams in North West England. Promoted teams moved up to North West 2 while relegated teams dropped to either South Lancs/Cheshire 1 or North Lancs/Cumbria depending on their location.

At the end of the 1999-2000 the division was cancelled along with North West 1, North West 2, and their counterparts North East 1, North East 2 and North East 3, due to northern league restructuring by the RFU. Most teams in North West 3 were transferred to their relevant regional leagues - South Lancs/Cheshire 1, South Lancs/Cheshire 2, North Lancs/Cumbria or the Cumbrian League depending on final league position.

== Original teams ==
When this division was introduced in 1996 it contained the following teams:

- Calder Vale (Note: Calder Vale would be renamed as Burnley RUFC in 2002.) - promoted from Cumbria/Lancs North (runners up)
- Caldy - relegated from North West 2 (11th)
- Cockermouth - relegated from North West 1 (13th)
- Merseyside Police - relegated from North West 2 (9th)
- Rossendale - relegated from North West 2 (10th)
- Ruskin Park - promoted from Cheshire/Lancs South (champions)
- Stockport - relegated from North West 2 (13th)
- Wigan - relegated from North West 2 (12th)
- Windermere - relegated from North West 2 (8th)
- Workington - promoted from Cumbria/Lancs North (champions)

== North West 3 honours ==
North West 3
Season	No of Teams	Champions	Runners–up	Relegated Teams
1996–97	10	Merseyside Police	Caldy	Ruskin Park
1997–98	10	Southport	Altrincham Kersal	Windermere
1998–99	10	Wigan	Workington	Old Salians
1999–00	10	Rochdale (Note: As North West 2 cancelled at the end of the season Rochdale would instead transfer to North Lancs/Cumbria.)	Blackpool (Note: As North West 1, 2 and 3 were to be cancelled runners up Blackpool and Rossendale were transferred to North Lancashire/Cumbria while St Edward's O.B. and Warrington went into South Lancs/Cheshire 1.)	Wallasey, St Benedicts, Sandbach (Note: Although not technically relegated these teams were transferred into lower level divisions than others teams in North West 3 with Wallasey and Sandbach going into South Lancs/Cheshire 2 and St Benedicts going into the Cumbrian League.)
Green backgrounds are promotion places.

== Number of league titles ==
- Merseyside Police (1)
- Rochdale (1)
- Southport (1)
- Wigan (1)

== See also ==
- English Rugby Union Leagues
- English rugby union system
- Rugby union in England
