= St John Rigby College, Wigan =

Coordinates: 53°33′16″N 2°41′53″W

St John Rigby College

Location
- Gathurst Road; Wigan, Greater Manchester, WN5 0LJ; England

Information
- Type: Sixth Form/Further Education
- Religious affiliation: Roman Catholic
- Established: 1972
- Local authority: Wigan
- Department for Education URN: 130523 Tables
- Ofsted: Reports
- Principal: Paula Nolan
- Executive Principal: Peter McGhee
- Gender: Coeducational
- Age: 16 to 19
- Enrolment: 1,372
- Website: www.sjr.ac.uk

St. John Rigby College (abbreviated as St.JR, SJR or simply John Rigby) is a sixth form college in the Orrell district of the Metropolitan Borough of Wigan, Greater Manchester: and situated in a 30-acre (12 ha) estate. As a college for students who intend to proceed into higher education, students are accepted from across the Metropolitan Borough of Wigan and Metropolitan Borough of Bolton areas of Greater Manchester as well as parts of Merseyside and Lancashire.

The school's Level pass rate was 98% in 2009 - well above the national average -thanks to its vocational courses at Levels 1, 2, and 3. Upon successful completion, students go on to attend wide range of universities across the UK and abroad. The college also works to promote Fairtrade and form partnerships with people in other countries - such as Brazil - in partnership with CAFOD. It also has partnerships with other colleges with Loreto College, Manchester.

== History ==
The school was originally a Christian Brothers boys' grammar school, and was named Blessed John Rigby RC Grammar School. At the time of the school's opening, Blessed John Rigby was not yet canonised.

The school was officially opened by Cardinal William Godfrey on Saturday 18 June 1960, as the St John Rigby Grammar and Technical School, with Archbishop John Heenan in attendance.

Work had started in October 1958, and the first entrants arrived in September 1959, with those only from Up Holland, being 150 in total. There would be 700 at the school, and it had cost £200,000. There was a lot of mining subsistence under the school. Lancashire education committee gave £32,000 towards the school. Percy Lord, the education chief of Lancashire, attended the opening.

In the mid-1960s, £161,000 of buildings provided a three-form entry. The first headmaster JC Ambrose left in July 1965, to be head of St Mary's College. In September 1965 the headmaster was Rev ND O'Halloran, from St Anselm's College.

In 1972 the school became a Sixth Form College under the trusteeship of the Roman Catholic Archbishop of Liverpool. In 2022 the college celebrated its 50th anniversary.

== Saint John Rigby ==
St John Rigby College was named after the English Roman Catholic martyr John Rigby, who was executed during the reign of Elizabeth I. He is one of the Forty Martyrs of England and Wales.

== Admittance to the college ==
=== Enrollment ===
Before the year of entry, application forms are distributed to High Schools in different areas, students who are looking to enroll at the college may attend an open evening. All students who accept a position to study at St. John Rigby College are invited to attend a New Students' Day in June.

Dependent upon the route taken will depend on the points necessary to guarantee a place in the college, (Route A) 40 Points, (Route B) 35 Points (Route C) 25 Points, (Route D) 15 Points. These will be calculated from the best 8 GCSEs which may be any or specific GCSEs that may be required to be included in the best 8 at a certain grade. (See below for points table):

Grade	Points
9	9
A*/8	8
A/7	7
B/6	6
C/5	5
D/4	4
E/3	3
F/2	2
G/1	1

=== Acceptance ===
If accepted, students can choose at what level they wish to study. This consists of 5 levels:

- Entry Level - Entry Level
- Level 1 (Introductory Level) - NVQ Level 1, BTEC Introductory Award
- Level 2 (Intermediate Level) - NVQ Level 2, BTEC First Diploma, GCSE
- Level 3 (Advanced Level) - NVQ Level 3, BTEC National, AS and A Level
- Level 3 (Degrees) - NVQ Level 4, BTEC Higher National, Foundational Degrees

As well as completing chosen courses, students are also required to study 'Values for living' and are also required to take on 'extended studies'. This can be a course completely different from the courses students have chosen to take (e.g., School Production, Driving Theory, First Aid). The majority of students who are enrolled at the college are aged 16–18 and are on Level 3 programs full-time. From here they then proceed to a range of universities across the UK.

== Campus ==
The college is large consisting of 8 blocks (A Block - H Block) and is situated on a single campus 3.5 miles west of Wigan on Gathurst Road, Orrell, near the birthplace of the man for whom the school was named (St John Rigby). In February 2006 the college opened its new Learning Resource Centre (LRC) which offers a wide range of services and support to students.

=== Sports facilities ===
The college boasts the largest all-weather football pitch in the country and has extensive playing fields surrounding the campus. The Sports Hall has facilities for a wide range of sports, and a fitness suite, as well as being used by students, the pitch is also used by others outside the college (e.g. Wigan Athletic F.C. have used the pitch in the past for practice).

=== College Chapel ===
As a Roman Catholic school, students can visit the newly built College Chapel, which is available at any time of the day as a place of prayer, reflection, or quietness. The college Chaplaincy team currently runs a Fairtrade store which is open to all students and staff.

=== SJR Community Team ===
The college is currently building up a community team involving a large number of students getting involved with open days, college events such as Rigfest (a night when student bands play their music), and getting involved with tea and coffee mornings and working with the chaplaincy team with other events.

=== The Learning Resource Centre (LRC) ===
The college Learning Resource Centre offers a wide range of services and support to students such as over 11,000 books in stock, DVDs, and online resources.

=== Open Learning Centre (OLC) ===
In the Open Learning Centre, Students have access to over 96 network-connected computers to aid them in their learning, with Computer Technicians available to help with any problems any time of the day.

== Pearson Teaching Awards ==
In 2012, Physical education lecturer and head of department, Mr. John Ireland, was awarded the "Further Education Teacher of the Year Award in the North" in the Teaching Awards. He was awarded due to numerous nominations by students past and present, as a thank you for his 32 years of teaching to students in sport, which includes students going on to play for top teams such as Wigan Warriors.

== Student Council ==
The Student Council is a governing body who are representative of the students and on their behalf puts forward any suggestions for improvement that any students think should be considered as well as organizing college events.

== Notable alumni ==
- Vincent Nichols, Archbishop of Westminster, former Chaplain
- Iain Coyle, TV presenter, TV producer and stand-up comedian
- Jon Culshaw, impressionist and comedian
- Shaun Edwards, Rugby League International/Welsh Union coach
- Eva Pope, Actress (Waterloo Road)
- Vernon Kay, TV presenter, DJ and former model
- Joe Lydon, Rugby League International
- Stuart Maconie, BBC Radio 2 DJ/TV presenter
- Luke Marsden, Big Brother 2008 (UK)
- Paul Rowley, BBC political correspondent
- Iain Thornley (Wigan Warriors Rugby league player)
- Sean O'Loughlin (Wigan Warriors Rugby League Captain)
- Phil Clarke (Sky Sports Rugby League Pundit, former Wigan and GB Player)
- Joe Burgess (Wigan Warriors) - Rugby Player
- Jennifer Reynolds, Actress (Coronation Street)
- Junior Nsemba (Wigan Warriors Rugby league player)
