= 2002–03 National Division One =

Rugby union competition in England

- Countries: England
- Champions: Rotherham
- Runners-up: Worcester
- Relegated: Moseley and Rugby Lions
- Attendance: 190,949 (average 1,073 per match) (Note: Note that 4 home attendances are missing (see below) - so the total attendance will not be 100% accurate. The average attendance has also been taken into account with the missing games not included.)
- Highest attendance: 5,700 Worcester at home to Rotherham on 12 April 2003
- Lowest attendance: 250 Wakefield at home to Rugby Lions on 2 November 2002
- Top point scorer: (Canada) James Pritchard (Bedford Blues) 374 points
- Top try scorer: (England) Duncan Roke (Worcester) 26 tries

The 2002–03 National Division One (for sponsorship reasons known as the Jewson National Division One) was the 16th full season of rugby union within the second tier of the English league system, currently known as the RFU Championship. New teams to the division included Orrell and Plymouth Albion who were promoted from 2001–02 National Division Two while no team was relegated from the 2001–02 Zurich Premiership as Rotherham's ground was not deemed suitable for top flight games.

For the second year in a row Rotherham, were champions, and this year they were promoted to the Zurich Premiership for season 2003–04 with Worcester finishing as runners–up for the third consecutive season. Moseley and Rugby were relegated to the 2003–04 National Division Two.

== Participating teams ==
Locations of the 2002–03 National Division One teams

Team	Stadium	Capacity	City/Area
Bedford Blues	Goldington Road	5,000	Bedford, Bedfordshire
Birmingham & Solihull	Sharmans Cross	4,000	Solihull, West Midlands
Coventry	Coundon Road	10,000 (1,100 seats)	Coventry, West Midlands
Exeter Chiefs	County Ground	5,750 (750 seats)	Exeter, Devon
London Welsh	Old Deer Park	4,500 (1,500 seats)	Richmond, London
Manchester	Grove Park	4,000	Cheadle Hulme, Greater Manchester
Moseley	Bournbrook		Birmingham, West Midlands
Orrell	Edge Hall Road	5,300 (300 seats)	Orrell, Greater Manchester
Otley	Cross Green	7,000 (852 seats)	Otley, West Yorkshire
Plymouth Albion	Beacon Park	3,500 (450 seats)	Plymouth, Devon
Rotherham	Millmoor	8,300	Rotherham, South Yorkshire
Rugby Lions	Webb Ellis Road	3,200 (200 seats)	Rugby, Warwickshire
Wakefield	College Grove	4,000 (500 seats)	Wakefield, West Yorkshire
Worcester	Sixways	8,477	Worcester, Worcestershire

== Table ==
2002–03 National Division One table
Pos	Team	Pld	W	D	L	PF	PA	PD	B	Pts	Qualification
1	Rotherham (C)	26	24	0	2	1077	336	+741	20	116	Promoted
2	Worcester	26	23	0	3	1185	431	+754	22	114	
3	Exeter Chiefs	26	20	2	4	940	459	+481	20	104	
4	Orrell	26	18	2	6	854	595	+259	15	91	
5	London Welsh	26	15	0	11	627	565	+62	16	76	
6	Coventry	26	14	0	12	761	684	+77	12	68	
7	Bedford Blues	26	13	1	12	675	760	−85	10	64	
8	Birmingham & Solihull	26	12	2	12	630	569	+61	11	63	
9	Plymouth Albion	26	10	1	15	679	697	−18	18	60	
10	Wakefield	26	9	0	17	451	710	−259	11	47	
11	Otley	26	9	0	17	597	839	−242	11	47	
12	Manchester	26	7	0	19	484	791	−307	11	39	
13	Moseley	26	4	0	22	399	1178	−779	7	23	Relegated
14	Rugby Lions	26	0	0	26	422	1167	−745	7	7	Relegated

Source: rugbyarchive.net
Rules for classification: Points are awarded as follows: four points for a win; two points for a draw; no points for a loss; one bonus point for scoring four tries or more in a match; one bonus point for losing by seven points or less.
- If teams are level at any stage, tiebreakers are applied in the following order: (1) difference between points for and against; (2) total number of points for.
  (C) Champion

== Results ==
=== Round 1 ===
31 August 2002

Bedford Blues	21 - 15	Moseley
	Report

Goldington Road
Attendance: 1,722
Referee: Eric Woodmason

31 August 2002

Birmingham & Solihull	35 - 10	London Welsh
	Report

Sharmans Cross
Attendance: 500
Referee: Nigel Higginson

31 August 2002

Coventry	23 - 29	Worcester
	Report

Butts Park Arena
Attendance: 2,495
Referee: Geraint Ashton-Jones

31 August 2002

Exeter Chiefs	51 - 15	Wakefield
	Report

County Ground
Attendance: 840
Referee: Wayne Barnes

31 August 2002

Manchester	15 - 24	Plymouth Albion
	Report

Grove Park
Attendance: 750
Referee: Tim Wigglesworth

1 September 2002

Orrell	70 - 23	Rugby Lions
	Report

Edge Hall Road
Attendance: 707
Referee: David Grashoff

1 September 2002

Otley	6 - 53	Rotherham
	Report

Cross Green
Attendance: 2,000
Referee: Rob Debney

=== Round 2 ===
7 September 2002

Coventry	50 - 0	Birmingham & Solihull
	Report

Coundon Road
Attendance: 2,500
Referee: Tim Miller

7 September 2002

Moseley	19 - 31	London Welsh
	Report

Bournbrook
Attendance: 422
Referee: Mark Wilson

7 September 2002

Plymouth Albion	49 - 29	Bedford Blues
	Report

Beacon Park
Attendance: 2,000
Referee: David Rose

7 September 2002

Wakefield	18 - 13	Manchester
	Report

College Grove
Attendance: 350
Referee: Malcom Changleng

7 September 2002

Worcester	35 - 10	Orrell
	Report

Sixways
Attendance: 2,074
Referee: Ashley Rowden

8 September 2002

Rotherham	35 - 30	Exeter Chiefs
	Report

Millmoor
Attendance: 1,600
Referee: Tim Fisher

8 September 2002

Rugby Lions	25 - 38	Otley
	Report

Webb Ellis Road
Attendance: 454
Referee: Tim Wigglesworth

=== Round 3 ===
14 September 2002

Bedford Blues	47 - 14	Wakefield
	Report

Goldington Road
Attendance: 1,490
Referee: Tim Wigglesworth

14 September 2002

Birmingham & Solihull	68 - 14	Moseley
	Report

Sharmans Cross
Attendance: 750
Referee: Geraint Ashton-Jones

14 September 2002

Exeter Chiefs	89 - 17	Rugby Lions
	Report

County Ground
Attendance: 786
Referee: Tim Miller

14 September 2002

London Welsh	29 - 19	Plymouth Albion
	Report

Old Deer Park
Attendance: 1,100
Referee: Sean Davey

14 September 2002

Manchester	15 - 39	Rotherham
	Report

Grove Park
Attendance: 1,200
Referee: David Rose

14 September 2002

Orrell	28 - 24	Coventry
	Report

Edge Hall Road
Attendance: 747
Referee: Rob Debney

14 September 2002

Otley	24 - 62	Worcester
	Report

Cross Green
Attendance: 800
Referee: Mark Wilson

=== Round 4 ===
21 September 2002

Coventry	57 - 15	Otley
	Report

Coundon Road
Attendance: 2,000
Referee: Malcolm Changeleng

21 September 2002

Orrell	18 - 27	Birmingham & Solihull
	Report

Edge Hall Road
Attendance: 742
Referee: Eric Woodmason

21 September 2002

Plymouth Albion	46 - 15	Moseley
	Report

Beacon Park
Attendance: 1,676
Referee: Trevor Fisher

21 September 2002

Wakefield	13 - 20	London Welsh
	Report

College Grove
Attendance: 275
Referee: David Grashoff

21 September 2002

Worcester	28 - 25	Exeter Chiefs
	Report

Sixways
Attendance: 3,026
Referee: Geraint Ashton-Jones

22 September 2002

Rotherham	51 - 6	Bedford Blues
	Report

Millmoor
Attendance: 1,380
Referee: Wayne Barnes

22 September 2002

Rugby Lions	14 - 27	Manchester
	Report

Webb Ellis Road
Attendance: 400
Referee: Alan Biggs

=== Round 5 ===
28 September 2002

Bedford Blues	37 - 13	Rugby Lions
	Report

Goldington Road
Attendance: 1,675
Referee: Mark Wilson

28 September 2002

Birmingham & Solihull	31 - 8	Plymouth Albion
	Report

Sharmans Cross
Attendance: 500
Referee: Martin Fox

28 September 2002

Exeter Chiefs	35 - 0	Coventry
	Report

County Ground
Attendance: 1,450
Referee: David Rose

28 September 2002

London Welsh	22 - 49	Rotherham
	Report

Old Deer Park
Attendance: 1,150
Referee: Tim Miller

28 September 2002

Manchester	22 - 66	Worcester
	Report

Grove Park
Attendance: 785
Referee: Trevor Fisher

28 September 2002

Moseley	10 - 25	Wakefield
	Report

Bournbrook
Attendance: 750
Referee: Nigel Higginson

28 September 2002

Otley	47 - 24	Orrell
	Report

Cross Green
Attendance: 750
Referee: Sean Davey

=== Round 6 ===
5 October 2002

Coventry	14 - 12	Manchester
	Report

Coundon Road
Attendance: 1,500
Referee: Tim Wigglesworth

5 October 2002

Orrell	24 - 24	Exeter Chiefs
	Report

Edge Hall Road
Attendance: 486
Referee: Mark Wilson

5 October 2002

Otley	23 - 30	Birmingham & Solihull
	Report

Cross Green
Attendance: 600
Referee: Geraint Ashton-Jones

5 October 2002

Rugby Lions	19 - 39	London Welsh
	Report

Webb Ellis Road
Attendance: 348
Referee: Wayne Barnes

5 October 2002

Wakefield	22 - 16	Plymouth Albion
	Report

College Grove
Attendance: 304
Referee: Tim Miller

5 October 2002

Worcester	69 - 10	Bedford Blues
	Report

Sixways
Attendance: 2,500
Referee: Sean Davey

6 October 2002

Rotherham	102 - 3	Moseley
	Report

Millmoor
Attendance: 1,200
Referee: Rob Debney

=== Round 7 ===
12 October 2002

Bedford Blues	26 - 28	Coventry
	Report

Goldington Road
Attendance: 1,642

12 October 2002

Birmingham & Solihull	23 - 20	Wakefield
	Report

Sharmans Cross
Attendance: 400

12 October 2002

Exeter Chiefs	69 - 11	Otley
	Report

County Ground
Attendance: 900

12 October 2002

London Welsh	7 - 53	Worcester
	Report

Old Deer Park
Attendance: 1,475
Referee: Mark Wilson

12 October 2002

Manchester	26 - 48	Orrell
	Report

Grove Park
Attendance: 850
Referee: David Sainsbury

12 October 2002

Moseley	24 - 15	Rugby Lions
	Report

Bournbrook
Attendance: 433
Referee: Sean Davey

12 October 2002

Plymouth Albion	13 - 23	Rotherham
	Report

Beacon Park
Attendance: 1,940
Referee: David Grashoff

=== Round 8 ===
26 October 2002

Coventry	17 - 26	London Welsh
	Report

Coundon Road
Attendance: 1,700
Referee: Nigel Higginson

26 October 2002

Exeter Chiefs	35 - 35	Birmingham & Solihull
	Report

County Ground
Attendance: 1,213
Referee: David Sainsbury

26 October 2002

Orrell	43 - 23	Bedford Blues
	Report

Edge Hall Lane
Attendance: 801
Referee: Alan Biggs

26 October 2002

Otley	23 - 16	Manchester
	Report

Cross Green
Attendance: 740
Referee: Andrew Pearce

26 October 2002

Rugby Lions	36 - 39	Plymouth Albion
	Report

Webb Ellis Road
Attendance: 390
Referee: Geraint Ashton-Jones

26 October 2002

Worcester	74 - 8	Moseley
	Report

Sixways
Attendance: 2,469
Referee: Tim Wigglesworth

27 October 2002

Rotherham	44 - 6	Wakefield
	Report

Millmoor
Referee: Sean Davey

=== Round 9 ===
2 November 2002

Bedford Blues	24 - 16	Otley
	Report

Goldington Road
Attendance: 1,471
Referee: Wayne Barnes

2 November 2002

Birmingham & Solihull	10 - 20	Rotherham
	Report

Sharmans Cross
Attendance: 700
Referee: David Grashoff

2 November 2002

London Welsh	18 - 28	Orrell
	Report

Old Deer Park
Attendance: 980
Referee: David Sainsbury

2 November 2002

Manchester	5 - 45	Exeter Chiefs
	Report

Grove Park
Attendance: 475
Referee: Rob Debney

2 November 2002

Moseley	7 - 23	Coventry
	Report

Bournbrook
Attendance: 650
Referee: Sean Davey

2 November 2002

Plymouth Albion	12 - 30	Worcester
	Report

Beacon Park
Attendance: 1,786
Referee: David Rose

2 November 2002

Wakefield	31 - 9	Rugby Lions
	Report

College Grove
Attendance: 250
Referee: Alan Biggs

=== Round 10 ===
15 November 2002

Exeter Chiefs	28 - 12	Bedford Blues
	Report

County Ground
Attendance: 1,450
Referee: Alan Biggs

15 November 2002

Rugby Lions	0 - 31	Rotherham
	Report

Webb Ellis Road
Referee: Rob Debney

16 November 2002

Coventry	28 - 27	Plymouth Albion
	Report

Counden Road
Attendance: 900
Referee: Wayne Barnes

16 November 2002

Manchester	10 - 21	Birmingham & Solihull
	Report

Grove Park
Attendance: 350
Referee: David Rose

16 November 2002

Otley	25 - 17	London Welsh
	Report

Cross Green
Attendance: 450
Referee: Nigel Higginson

16 November 2002

Worcester	36 - 0	Wakefield
	Report

Sixways
Attendance: 800
Referee: David Grashoff

17 November 2002

Orrell	57 - 6	Moseley
	Report

Edge Hall Road
Attendance: 402
Referee: Tim Wigglesworth

=== Round 11 ===
23 November 2002

Bedford Blues	54 - 28	Manchester
	Report

Goldington Road
Attendance: 1,159
Referee: Andrew Pearce

23 November 2002

Birmingham & Solihull	23 - 3	Rugby Lions
	Report

Sharmans Cross
Attendance: 300
Referee: Trevor Fisher

23 November 2002

Plymouth Albion	27 - 27	Orrell
	Report

Beacon Park
Attendance: 1,056
Referee: Eric Woodmason

23 November 2002

Rotherham	38 - 13	Worcester
	Report

Millmoor
Attendance: 4,000
Referee: Martin Fox

23 November 2002

Wakefield	17 - 22	Coventry
	Report

College Grove
Attendance: 250
Referee: Nigel Higginson

24 November 2002

London Welsh	17 - 15	Exeter Chiefs
	Report

Old Deer Park
Attendance: 500
Referee: Mark Wilson

24 November 2002

Moseley	30 - 19	Otley
	Report

Bournbrook
Attendance: 328
Referee: Nick Williams

=== Round 12 ===
7 December 2002

Bedford Blues	19 - 7	Birmingham & Solihull
	Report

Goldington Road
Attendance: 1,510
Referee: Martin Fox

7 December 2002

Coventry	23 - 37	Rotherham
	Report

Coundon Road
Attendance: 1,200
Referee: Tim Miller

7 December 2002

Exeter Chiefs	73 - 0	Moseley
	Report

County Ground
Attendance: 1,100
Referee: Nigel Higginson

7 December 2002

Manchester	10 - 32	London Welsh
	Report

Grove Park
Attendance: 350
Referee: David Grashoff

7 December 2002

Orrell	22 - 8	Wakefield
	Report

Edge Hall Road
Attendance: 760
Referee: Steve Lander

7 December 2002

Otley	21 - 40	Plymouth Albion
	Report

Cross Green
Attendance: 500
Referee: Tim Wigglesworth

7 December 2002

Worcester	67 - 3	Rugby Lions
	Report

Sixways
Attendance: 1,939
Referee: Trevor Fisher

=== Round 13 ===
14 December 2002

Birmingham & Solihull	17 - 37	Worcester
	Report

Sharmans Cross
Attendance: 1,200
Referee: Sean Davey

14 December 2002

London Welsh	24 - 26	Bedford Blues
	Report

Old Deer Park
Attendance: 1,130
Referee: David Rose

14 December 2002

Moseley	16 - 20	Manchester
	Report

Bournbrook
Attendance: 521
Referee: Trevor Fisher

14 December 2002

Plymouth Albion	5 - 12	Exeter Chiefs
	Report

Beacon Park
Attendance: 3,420
Referee: Martin Fox

14 December 2002

Rotherham	29 - 17	Orrell
	Report

Millmoor
Attendance: 1,250
Referee: Wayne Barnes

14 December 2002

Rugby Lions	20 - 31	Coventry
	Report

Webb Ellis Road
Attendance: 682
Referee: David Sainsbury

15 December 2002

Wakefield	12 - 3	Otley
	Report

College Grove
Attendance: 300
Referee: Tim Miller

=== Round 14 ===
3 January 2003

Rugby Lions	17 - 46	Orrell
	Report

Webb Ellis Road
Attendance: 400

4 January 2003

London Welsh	30 - 25	Birmingham & Solihull
	Report

Old Deer Park
Attendance: 600
Referee: Malcom Changleng

4 January 2003

Moseley	P - P	Bedford Blues

- Postponed. Game rescheduled to 16 February 2003.

4 January 2003

Plymouth Albion	47 - 20	Manchester
	Report

Beacon Park
Attendance: 1,246
Referee: Sean Davey

4 January 2003

Rotherham	P - P	Otley

- Postponed. Game rescheduled to 16 February 2003.

4 January 2003

Wakefield	P - P	Exeter Chiefs

- Postponed. Game rescheduled to 21 April 2003.

4 January 2003

Worcester	62 - 14	Coventry
	Report

Sixways
Attendance: 2,733
Referee: David Sainsbury

=== Round 15 ===
11 January 2003

Bedford Blues	P - P	Plymouth Albion

- Postponed. Game rescheduled to 23 March 2003.

11 January 2003

Birmingham & Solihull	P - P	Coventry

- Postponed. Game rescheduled to 16 February 2003.

11 January 2003

Exeter Chiefs	P - P	Rotherham

- Postponed. Game rescheduled to 22 March 2003.

11 January 2003

London Welsh	P - P	Moseley

- Postponed. Game rescheduled to 8 March 2003.

11 January 2003

Manchester	P - P	Wakefield

- Postponed. Game rescheduled to 8 March 2003.

11 January 2003

Orrell	P - P	Worcester

- Postponed. Game rescheduled to 16 February 2003.

11 January 2003

Otley	41 - 15	Rugby Lions
	Report

Cross Green
Referee: Tim Beddow

=== Round 16 ===
17 January 2003

Rugby Lions	10 - 27	Exeter Chiefs
	Report

Webb Ellis Road
Attendance: 280
Referee: Rob Debney

18 January 2003

Coventry	22 - 41	Orrell
	Report

Coundon Road
Referee: Martin Fox

18 January 2003

Moseley	0 - 55	Birmingham & Solihull
	Report

Bournbrook
Attendance: 514
Referee: Mark Wilson

18 January 2003

Plymouth Albion	0 - 15	London Welsh
	Report

Beacon Park
Attendance: 1,590
Referee: Wayne Barnes

18 January 2003

Wakefield	24 - 18	Bedford Blues
	Report

College Grove
Attendance: 400
Referee: Tim Beddow

18 January 2003

Worcester	61 - 12	Otley
	Report

Sixways
Attendance: 2,354
Referee: David Rose

19 January 2003

Rotherham	34 - 10	Manchester
	Report

Millmoor
Attendance: 1,210
Referee: Sean Davey

=== Round 17 ===
25 January 2003

Bedford Blues	P - P	Rotherham

- Postponed. Game rescheduled to 8 March 2003.

25 January 2003

Birmingham & Solihull	10 - 38	Orrell
	Report

Sharmans Cross
Attendance: 350
Referee: Rob Debney

25 January 2003

Exeter Chiefs	16 - 20	Worcester
	Report

County Ground
Attendance: 2,288
Referee: Ashley Rowden

25 January 2003

London Welsh	29 - 8	Wakefield
	Report

Old Deer Park
Attendance: 750
Referee: Nigel Higginson

25 January 2003

Manchester	39 - 17	Rugby Lions
	Report

Grove Park
Attendance: 350
Referee: Geraint Ashton-Jones

25 January 2003

Moseley	25 - 24	Plymouth Albion
	Report

Bournbrook
Attendance: 326
Referee: Trevor Fisher

25 January 2003

Otley	32 - 25	Coventry
	Report

Cross Green
Attendance: 600
Referee: Mark Wilson

=== Round 18 ===
1 February 2003

Coventry	P - P	Exeter Chiefs

- Postponed. Game rescheduled to 9 April 2003.

1 February 2003

Orrell	42 - 8	Otley
	Report

Edge Hall Road
Attendance: 807
Referee: David Rose

1 February 2003

Plymouth Albion	27 - 24	Birmingham & Solihull
	Report

Beacon Park
Attendance: 1,625
Referee: S Leyshon

1 February 2003

Rotherham	18 - 12	London Welsh
	Report

Millmoor
Attendance: 1,200
Referee: Rob Debney

1 February 2003

Rugby Lions	23 - 35	Bedford Blues
	Report

Webb Ellis Road
Attendance: 580
Referee: Nigel Higginson

1 February 2003

Wakefield	19 - 14	Moseley
	Report

College Grove
Attendance: 300
Referee: Alan Biggs

1 February 2003

Worcester	57 - 5	Manchester
	Report

Sixways
Attendance: 2,224
Referee: Wayne Barnes

=== Round 19 ===
8 February 2003

Bedford Blues	9 - 45	Worcester
	Report

Goldington Road
Attendance: 2,227
Referee: Geraint Ashton-Jones

8 February 2003

Birmingham & Solihull	7 - 21	Otley
	Report

Sharmans Cross
Attendance: 200
Referee: Tim Beddow

8 February 2003

Exeter Chiefs	27-13	Orrell
	Report

County Ground
Attendance: 1,150
Referee: Sean Davey

8 February 2003

London Welsh	67 - 17	Rugby Lions
	Report

Old Deer Park
Attendance: 890
Referee: Tim Wigglesworth

8 February 2003

Manchester	17 - 34	Coventry
	Report

Grove Park
Attendance: 350
Referee: David Sainsbury

8 February 2003

Moseley	7 - 75	Rotherham
	Report

Bournbrook
Attendance: 453
Referee: Nigel Higginson

8 February 2003

Plymouth Albion	27 - 22	Wakefield
	Report

Beacon Park
Attendance: 1,719
Referee: Tim Miller

=== Round 14 & 15 (rescheduled games) ===
16 February 2003

Birmingham & Solihull	36 - 25	Coventry
	Report

Sharmans Cross
Attendance: 300
Referee: Geraint Ashton-Jones

- Game rescheduled from 11 January 2003..

16 February 2003

Moseley	31 - 51	Bedford Blues
	Report

Bournbrook
Attendance: 451
Referee: David Sainsbury

- Game rescheduled from 4 January 2003.

16 February 2003

Orrell	27 - 24	Worcester
	Report

Edge Hall Road
Attendance: 746
Referee: Ashley Rowden

- Game rescheduled from 11 January 2003.

16 February 2003

Rotherham	34 - 20	Otley
	Report

Millmoor
Attendance: 1,500
Referee: David Grashoff

- Game rescheduled from 4 January 2003.

=== Round 21 (rescheduled game) ===
19 February 2003

Bedford Blues	26 - 37	Orrell
	Report

Goldington Road
Attendance: 1,420
Referee: Wayne Barnes

- Game brought forward from 1 March 2003.

=== Round 20 ===
22 February 2003

Coventry	22 - 25	Bedford Blues
	Report

Coundon Road
Referee: Sean Davey

22 February 2003

Otley	27 - 29	Exeter Chiefs
	Report

Cross Green
Attendance: 720
Referee: Rob Debney

22 February 2003

Rugby Lions	18 - 21	Moseley
	Report

Webb Ellis Road
Attendance: 401
Referee: Eric Woodmason

22 February 2003

Wakefield	6 - 16	Birmingham & Solihull
	Report

College Grove
Attendance: 300
Referee: Mark Wilson

22 February 2003

Worcester	35 - 12	London Welsh
	Report

Sixways
Attendance: 2,252

23 February 2003

Orrell	32 - 25	Manchester
	Report

Edge Hall Road
Attendance: 607

23 February 2003

Rotherham	55 - 6	Plymouth Albion
	Report

Millmoor
Attendance: 1,000
Referee: Robin Goodliffe

=== Round 21 ===
1 March 2003

Bedford Blues	P - P	Orrell

- Game brought forward to 19 February 2003.

1 March 2003

Birmingham & Solihull	P - P	Exeter Chiefs

- Game postponed. Rescheduled to 8 March 2003.

1 March 2003

London Welsh	36 - 16	Coventry
	Report

Old Deer Park
Attendance: 1,400

1 March 2003

Manchester	18 - 9	Otley
	Report

Grove Park
Attendance: 372
Referee: P De Luca

1 March 2003

Moseley	P - P	Worcester

- Postponed. Game rescheduled to 23 March 2003.

1 March 2003

Plymouth Albion	56 - 12	Rugby Lions
	Report

Beacon Park
Attendance: 1,380
Referee: Mark Wilson

1 March 2003

Wakefield	P - P	Rotherham

- Postponed. Game rescheduled to 5 April 2003.

=== Round 15, 17 & 21 (rescheduled games) ===
8 March 2003

Bedford Blues	13 - 40	Rotherham
	Report

Goldington Road
Attendance: 1,744
Referee: Trevor Fisher

- Game rescheduled from 25 January 2003.

8 March 2003

Birmingham & Solihull	22 - 24	Exeter Chiefs
	Report

Sharmans Cross
Attendance: 350
Referee: Malcom Changleng

- Game rescheduled from 1 March 2003.

8 March 2003

London Welsh	29 - 0	Moseley
	Report

Old Deer Park
Attendance: 400
Referee: Nigel Higginson

- Game rescheduled from 11 January 2003.

8 March 2003

Manchester	15 - 13	Wakefield
	Report

Grove Park
Attendance: 125
Referee: Robin Goodliffe

- Game rescheduled from 11 January 2003.

=== Round 22 ===
15 March 2003

Coventry	60 - 40	Moseley
	Report

Coundon Road
Attendance: 1,200
Referee: Mark Wilson

15 March 2003

Exeter Chiefs	49 - 5	Manchester
	Report

County Ground
Attendance: 1,139
Referee: Nigel Higginson

15 March 2003

Orrell	30 - 27	London Welsh
	Report

Edge Hall Road
Attendance: 550
Referee: Trevor Fisher

15 March 2003

Otley	41 - 32	Bedford Blues
	Report

Cross Green
Attendance: 740
Referee: Tim Wigglesworth

15 March 2003

Rotherham	38 - 16	Birmingham & Solihull
	Report

Millmoor
Attendance: 1,200
Referee: Sean Davey

15 March 2003

Rugby Lions	36 - 39	Wakefield
	Report

Webb Ellis Road
Attendance: 280
Referee: Tim Miller

15 March 2003

Worcester	55 - 36	Plymouth Albion
	Report

Sixways
Attendance: 2,018
Referee: David Grashoff

=== Rounds 15 & 21 (rescheduled games) ===
22 March 2003

Exeter Chiefs	30 - 19	Rotherham
	Report

County Ground
Attendance: 1,165
Referee: Geraint Ashton-Jones

- Game rescheduled from 11 January 2003.

23 March 2003

Bedford Blues	31 - 16	Plymouth Albion
	Report

Goldington Road
Attendance: Nick Williams
Referee: 1,442

- Game rescheduled from 11 January 2003.

23 March 2003

Moseley	14 - 70	Worcester
	Report

Bournbrook
Attendance: 685
Referee: Wayne Barnes

- Game rescheduled from 1 March 2003.

=== Round 23 ===
29 March 2003

Bedford Blues	23 - 32	Exeter Chiefs
	Report

Goldington Road
Attendance: 1,359
Referee: Eric Woodmason

29 March 2003

Birmingham & Solihull	27 - 29	Manchester
	Report

Sharmans Cross
Attendance: 250
Referee: S Leyshon

29 March 2003

London Welsh	36 - 27	Otley
	Report

Old Deer Park
Attendance: 680
Referee: Jean Matheu

29 March 2003

Moseley	18 - 52	Orrell
	Report

Bournbrook
Attendance: 323
Referee: David Grashoff

29 March 2003

Plymouth Albion	19 - 20	Coventry
	Report

Beacon Park
Attendance: 2,360
Referee: Rob Debney

29 March 2003

Rotherham	76 - 13	Rugby Lions
	Report

Millmoor
Attendance: 1,050
Referee: Tim Beddow

29 March 2003

Wakefield	36 - 55	Worcester
	Report

College Grove
Attendance: 450
Referee: David Rose

=== Rounds 18, 21 & 26 (rescheduled games) ===
5 April 2003

London Welsh	13 - 10	Manchester
	Report

Old Deer Park
Attendance: 1,100
Referee: Tim Wigglesworth

- Game brought forward from 26 April 2003.

5 April 2003

Wakefield	0 - 55	Rotherham
	Report

College Grove
Attendance: 850
Referee: Rob Debney

- Game rescheduled from 1 March 2003.

9 April 2003

Coventry	31 - 34	Exeter Chiefs
	Report

Coundon Road
Attendance: 850
Referee: Bruce Robertson

- Game rescheduled from 1 February 2003.

=== Round 24 ===
12 April 2003

Coventry	63 - 28	Wakefield
	Report

Coundon Road
Attendance: 1,000
Referee: Tim Beddow

12 April 2003

Exeter Chiefs	32 - 11	London Welsh
	Report

County Ground
Attendance: 1,224
Referee: Rob Debney

12 April 2003

Manchester	22 - 35	Bedford Blues
	Report

Grove Park
Attendance: 303
Referee: Nigel Higginson

12 April 2003

Orrell	48 - 24	Plymouth Albion
	Report

Edge Hall Road
Attendance: 400
Referee: P Bellett

12 April 2003

Otley	65 - 27	Moseley
	Report

Cross Green
Attendance: 435

12 April 2003

Rugby Lions	23 - 35	Birmingham & Solihull
	Report

Webb Ellis Road
Attendance: 275
Referee: Tim Wigglesworth

12 April 2003

Worcester	9 - 21	Rotherham
	Report

Sixways
Attendance: 5,700
Referee: S Leyshon

=== Round 25 ===
19 April 2003

Bedford Blues	19 - 18	London Welsh
	Report

Goldington Road
Attendance: 1,835
Referee: Tim Beddow

19 April 2003

Coventry	63 - 10	Rugby Lions
	Report

Coundon Road
Attendance: 1,400
Referee: Nigel Harrison

19 April 2003

Exeter Chiefs	39 - 22	Plymouth Albion
	Report

County Ground
Attendance: 2,958
Referee: David Sainsbury

19 April 2003

Manchester	50 - 10	Moseley
	Report

Grove Park
Attendance: 452
Referee: Robin Goodliffe

19 April 2003

Orrell	10 - 36	Rotherham
	Report

Edge Hall Road
Attendance: 1,410
Referee: Martin Fox

19 April 2003

Otley	10 - 14	Wakefield
	Report

Cross Green
Attendance: 730
Referee: Malcom Changleng

19 April 2003

Worcester	17 - 6	Birmingham & Solihull
	Report

Sixways
Attendance: 1,895
Referee: Eric Gauzins

=== Round 14 (rescheduled game) ===
21 April 2003

Wakefield	27 - 34	Exeter Chiefs

College Grove
Attendance: 250
Referee: Nick Williams

=== Round 26 ===
26 April 2003

Birmingham & Solihull	24 - 24	Bedford Blues
	Report

Sharmans Cross
Attendance: 700
Referee: Bruce Robertson

26 April 2003

London Welsh	P - P	Manchester

- Game brought forward to 5 April 2003.

26 April 2003

Moseley	25 - 36	Exeter Chiefs
	Report

Bournbrook
Attendance: 358
Referee: Alan Biggs

26 April 2003

Plymouth Albion	50 - 13	Otley
	Report

Beacon Park
Attendance: 2,780
Referee: Rowan Kitt

26 April 2003

Rotherham	25 - 26	Coventry
	Report

Millmoor
Attendance: 3,233
Referee: Wayne Barnes

26 April 2003

Rugby Lions	24 - 76	Worcester
	Report

Webb Ellis Road
Attendance: 480
Referee: David Sainsbury

26 April 2003

Wakefield	14 - 22	Orrell
	Report

College Grove
Attendance: 400
Referee: Tim Beddow

== Total Season Attendances ==
Club	Home Games	Total	Average	Highest	Lowest	% Capacity
Bedford Blues	13	20,696	1,592	2,227	1,159	32%
Birmingham & Solihull	13	6,500	500	1,200	200	13%
Coventry	11 (Note: Missing home attendances v Orrell on 18 January 2003 and Bedford Blues on 22 February 2003.)	16,745	1,522	2,500	850	15%
Exeter Chiefs	13	17,663	1,359	2,958	786	24%
London Welsh	13	12,155	935	1,475	400	21%
Manchester	13	6,712	516	1,200	125	13%
Moseley	13	6,214	478	750	323	N/A
Orrell	13	9,165	705	1,410	400	13%
Otley	12	9,065	755	2,000	435	11%
Plymouth Albion	13	24,578	1,891	3,420	1,056	54%
Rotherham	12 (Note: Missing home attendance v Wakefield on 27 October 2002.)	19,823	1,652	4,000	1,000	20%
Rugby Lions	12 (Note: Missing home attendance v Rotherham on 15 January 2003.)	4,970	414	682	275	13%
Wakefield	13	4,679	360	850	250	9%
Worcester	13	31,984	2,460	5,700	800	29%

== Individual statistics ==
- Note that points scorers includes tries as well as conversions, penalties and drop goals.

=== Top points scorers ===
Rank	Player	Team	Appearances	Points
1	(Canada) James Pritchard	Bedford Blues	26	374
2	(England) Tony Yapp	Exeter Chiefs	23	349
3	(England) Phil Jones	Orrell	26	346
4	(England) Simon Binns	Otley	23	269
5	(Italy) Ramiro Pez	Rotherham	17	265
6	(South Africa) Luke Smith	Rotherham / Birmingham & Solihull	24	166
7	(England) Brett McCormack	Plymouth Albion	22	152
8	(England) Simon Verbickas	Manchester	20	137
9	(England) Jon Boden	Rugby Lions	21	134
10	(England) Jon Benson	Rotherham	21	133

=== Top try scorers ===
Rank	Player	Team	Appearances	Tries
1	(England) Duncan Roke	Worcester	25	26
2	(England) Michael Wood	Rotherham	22	22
3	(England) Dan Ward-Smith	Plymouth Albion	26	21
4	(England) Nmandi Ezulike	Worcester	23	19
5	(Scotland) David Officer	Worcester	15	16
5	(England) Wes Davies	Orrell	22	16
5	(England) Nick Baxter	Birmingham & Solihull	26	16
6	(Scotland) Andy Craig	Orrell	14	15
6	(Australia) Chris Garrard	Worcester	21	15
6	(England) Phil Jones	Orrell	26	15

== Season records ==
=== Team ===
Largest home win — 99 pts

102 - 3 Rotherham at home to Moseley on 6 October 2002

Largest away win — 68 pts

75 - 7 Rotherham away to Moseley on 8 February 2003

Most points scored — 102 pts

102 - 3 Rotherham at home to Moseley on 6 October 2002

Most tries in a match — 14 (x2)

Exeter Chiefs at home to Rugby Lions on 14 September 2002
Rotherham at home to Moseley on 6 October 2002

Most conversions in a match — 10 (x3)

Rotherham at home to Moseley on 6 October 2002
Rotherham away to Moseley on 8 February 2003
Worcester away to Moseley on 22 March 2003

Most penalties in a match — 8 (x2)

Bedford Blues at home to Otley on 2 November 2002
Coventry at home to Exeter Chiefs on 9 April 2003

Most drop goals in a match — 2 (x3)

Plymouth Albion at home to Wakefield on 8 February 2003
Bedford Blues at home to Plymouth Albion on 23 March 2003
Exeter Chiefs at home to Plymouth Albion on 19 April 2003

=== Player ===
Most points in a match — 37

(Italy) Ramiro Pez for Rotherham at home to Moseley on 6 October 2002

Most tries in a match — 4 (x4)

(Australia) Drew Hickey for Orrell at home to Rugby Lions on 1 September 2002
(England) Dan Ward-Smith for Plymouth Albion away to Rugby Lions on 26 October 2002
(England) Dan Ward-Smith for Plymouth Albion at home to Manchester on 4 January 2003
(England) Duncan Roke for Worcester away to Rugby Lions on 26 April 2003

Most conversions in a match — 10 (x2)

(Italy) Ramiro Pez for Rotherham at home to Moseley on 6 October 2002
(England) Jon Benson for Rotherham away to Moseley on 8 February 2003

Most penalties in a match — 8 (x2)

(Canada) James Pritchard for Bedford Blues at home to Otley on 2 November 2002
(South Africa) Luke Smith for Coventry at home to Exeter Chiefs on 9 April 2003

Most drop goals in a match — 2 (x3)

(England) Tom Barlow for Plymouth Albion at home to Wakefield on 8 February 2003
(England) Ed Barnes for Bedford Blues at home to Plymouth Albion on 23 March 2003
(England) Tony Yapp for Exeter Chiefs at home to Plymouth Albion on 19 April 2003

=== Attendances ===
Highest — 5,700

Worcester at home to Rotherham on 12 April 2003

Lowest — 250

Wakefield at home to Rugby Lions on 2 November 2002

Highest Average Attendance — 2,460

Worcester

Lowest Average Attendance — 360

Wakefield

== See also ==
- English rugby union system
