= 2001–02 National Division Two =

Rugby union competition in England

- Countries: England
- Champions: Orrell
- Runners-up: Plymouth Albion (also promoted)
- Relegated: Preston Grasshoppers, Waterloo, Rosslyn Park
- Attendance: 85,620 (average 504 per match) (Note: Note that 12 home attendances are missing (see below) - so the total attendance will not be 100% accurate. The average attendance has also been taken into account with the missing games not included.)
- Highest attendance: 2,100 Plymouth Albion at home to Fylde on 5 January 2002
- Lowest attendance: 85 Preston Grasshoppers at home to Newbury Blues on 2 March 2002
- Top point scorer: (England) Phil Jones; Orrell 343 points
- Top try scorer: (England) Dan Ward-Smith; Plymouth Albion 23 tries

The 2001–02 National Division Two was the second version (fifteenth overall) of the third division of the English domestic rugby union competition using the name National Division Two. New teams to the division included Orrell and Waterloo who were relegated from the 2000–01 National Division One while Stourbridge (champions) and Sedgley Park (playoffs) came up from the 2000–01 National Division Three North and Plymouth Albion as champions of the 2000-01 National Division Three South. The league points system was 2 points for a win and 1 point for a draw.

The title race was extremely tight and went to the last game with Orrell winning their rescheduled game away to Nottingham to draw dead level with Plymouth Albion at the top of the table and take the title by virtue of a better points difference – the fact Orrell had won both of their games against Plymouth was largely responsible for their victory. Both sides would be promoted to the 2002–03 National Division One with Orrell making an instant return following their relegation at the start of the season while Plymouth would make it a second promotion in a row. As well as gaining promotion the Devon-based side would also be easily the most popular side in the division with over 19,000 fans in total attending throughout the season. At the opposite end of the table Preston Grasshoppers and Waterloo would be the first sides to be relegated, followed by Rosslyn Park who battled to the end but never had quite enough to overtake relegation rivals Stourbridge and Kendal. Preston and Waterloo would drop down to the 2002–03 National Division Three North while Rosslyn Park went down to the 2002–03 National Division Three South, with Waterloo suffering their second consecutive relegation. It was quite a turn around for Rosslyn Park who went within a whisker to being promoted the previous season only to be relegated this season.

== Participating teams and locations ==
Locations of the 2001-02 National Division Two teams

Team	Stadium	Capacity	City/Area
Esher	Molesey Road	3,000	Hersham, Surrey
Fylde	Woodlands Memorial Ground	7,500 (500 seats)	Lytham St. Annes, Lancashire
Harrogate	Claro Road	4,500 (500 seats)	Harrogate, North Yorkshire
Kendal	Mint Bridge	4,600 (600 seats)	Kendal, Cumbria
Newbury Blues	Monk's Lane	8,000	Newbury, Berkshire
Nottingham	Ireland Avenue	4,990 (590 seats)	Beeston, Nottinghamshire
Orrell	Edge Hall Road	5,300 (300 seats)	Orrell, Greater Manchester
Plymouth Albion	Beacon Park	3,500 (450 seats)	Plymouth, Devon
Preston Grasshoppers	Lightfoot Green	2,250 (250 seats)	Preston, Lancashire
Rosslyn Park	The Rock	2,000 (630 seats)	Roehampton, London
Sedgley Park	Park Lane	3,000	Whitefield, Greater Manchester
Stourbridge	Stourton Park 3,500 (450 seats)	Stourbridge, West Midlands	
Waterloo	St Anthony's Road	9,950 (950 seats)	Blundellsands, Merseyside
Wharfedale	The Avenue	2,000	Threshfield, Craven, North Yorkshire

== Final league table ==
2001–02 National Division Two table
Pos	Team	Pld	W	D	L	PF	PA	PD	Pts
1	Orrell (C, P)	26	23	0	3	962	369	+593	46
2	Plymouth Albion (P)	26	23	0	3	895	314	+581	46
3	Sedgley Park	26	20	1	5	684	468	+216	41
4	Harrogate	26	16	1	9	744	556	+188	33
5	Fylde	26	14	0	12	462	549	−87	28
6	Esher	26	12	0	14	547	587	−40	24
7	Nottingham	26	12	0	14	539	658	−119	24
8	Newbury Blues	26	12	0	14	548	723	−175	24
9	Wharfedale	26	11	2	13	603	638	−35	24
10	Kendal	26	10	0	16	576	607	−31	20
11	Stourbridge	26	9	1	16	600	702	−102	19
12	Rosslyn Park (R)	26	8	1	17	490	605	−115	17
13	Waterloo (R)	26	4	2	20	476	792	−316	10
14	Preston Grasshoppers (R)	26	4	0	22	401	959	−558	8

Updated to match(es) played on 20 April 2002. Source: Rugby Statbunker
(C) Champions; (P) Promoted; (R) Relegated

== Results ==
=== Round 1 ===
1 September 2001

Fylde	17 - 14	Kendal
	Report

Woodlands Memorial Ground
Attendance: 450

1 September 2001

Newbury Blues	20 - 38	Harrogate
	Report

Monk's Lane
Attendance: 720
Referee: Nigel Higginson

1 September 2001

Plymouth Albion	34 - 13	Sedgley Park
	Report

Beacon Park
Attendance: 1,600
Referee: Paul Dix

1 September 2001

Preston Grasshoppers	22 - 21	Esher
	Report

Lightfoot Green
Attendance: 260
Referee: Tim Wigglesworth

1 September 2001

Stourbridge	21 - 18	Orrell
	Report

Stourton Park
Attendance: 700
Referee: Andrew Pearce

1 September 2001

Waterloo	25 - 14	Nottingham
	Report

St Anthony's Road
Attendance: 464

1 September 2001

Wharfedale	15 - 18	Rosslyn Park
	Report

The Avenue
Attendance: 450
Referee: Wayne Barnes

=== Round 2 ===
8 September 2001

Esher	33 - 22	Newbury
	Report

Molesey Road
Attendance: 400
Referee: Richard Parker-Sedgmore

8 September 2001

Harrogate	48 - 32	Waterloo
	Report

Claro Road
Attendance: 487
Referee: Mike Hamlin

8 September 2001

Kendal	24 - 23	Wharfedale
	Report

Mint Bridge
Attendance: 550
Referee: Wayne Barnes

8 September 2001

Nottingham	16 - 18	Fylde
	Report

Ireland Avenue
Attendance: 311
Referee: D Edmunds

8 September 2001

Orrell	28 - 16	Preston Grasshoppers
	Report

Edge Hall Road
Attendance: 800

8 September 2001

Rosslyn Park	13 - 39	Sedgley Park
	Report

The Rock
Attendance: 600

8 September 2001

Stourbridge	10 - 34	Plymouth Albion
	Report

Stourton Park
Attendance: 650
Referee: David Matthews

=== Round 3 ===
15 September 2001

Fylde	13 - 9	Harrogate
	Report

Woodlands Memorial Ground
Attendance: 500

15 September 2001

Newbury Blues	26 - 24	Orrell
	Report

Monk's Lane
Attendance: 360
Referee: Wayne Barnes

15 September 2001

Plymouth Albion	19 - 15	Rosslyn Park
	Report

Beacon Park
Attendance: 1,900

15 September 2001

Preston Grasshoppers	13 - 16	Stourbridge
	Report

Lightfoot Green
Attendance: 280
Referee: Mark Wilson

15 September 2001

Sedgley Park	31 - 12	Kendal
	Report

Park Lane
Attendance: 800
Referee: Rob Debney

15 September 2001

Waterloo	15 - 50	Esher
	Report

St Anthony's Road
Attendance: 271
Referee: Nigel Higginson

15 September 2001

Wharfedale	46 - 13	Nottingham
	Report

The Avenue
Attendance: 400
Referee: Stuart Piercy

=== Round 4 ===
22 September 2001

Esher	26 - 3	Fylde
	Report

Molesey Road
Attendance: 400
Referee: Paul Dix

22 September 2001

Harrogate	51 - 36	Wharfedale
	Report

Claro Road
Attendance: 784
Referee: David Matthews

22 September 2001

Kendal	39 - 9	Rosslyn Park
	Report

Mint Bridge
Attendance: 300

22 September 2001

Nottingham	8 - 48	Sedgley Park
	Report

Ireland Avenue
Attendance: 211

22 September 2001

Orrell	51 - 18	Waterloo
	Report

Edge Hall Road
Attendance: 350
Referee: Chris Seeley

22 September 2001

Preston Grasshoppers	22 - 36	Plymouth Albion
	Report

Lightfoot Green
Attendance: 330
Referee: Mike Hamlin

22 September 2001

Stourbridge	37 - 14	Newbury Blues
	Report

Stourton Park
Attendance: 500
Referee: D Edmunds

=== Round 5 ===
6 October 2001

Fylde	13 - 28	Orrell
	Report

Woodlands Memorial Ground
Attendance: 500
Referee: David Matthews

6 October 2001

Newbury Blues	20 - 30	Preston Grasshoppers
	Report

Monk's Lane
Attendance: 320
Referee: Steve Savage

6 October 2001

Plymouth Albion	57 - 12	Kendal
	Report

Beacon Park

6 October 2001

Rosslyn Park	11 - 18	Nottingham
	Report

The Rock
Attendance: 500

6 October 2001

Sedgley Park	33 - 27	Harrogate
	Report

Park Lane
Attendance: 325
Referee: Nick Williams

6 October 2001

Waterloo	12 - 31	Stourbridge
	Report

St Anthony's Road
Attendance: 150
Referee: Tim Miller

6 October 2001

Wharfedale	16 - 13	Esher
	Report

The Avenue
Attendance: 400
Referee: David Rose

=== Round 6 ===
20 October 2001

Esher	16 - 14	Segdley Park
	Report

Molesey Road
Attendance: 300
Referee: Roy Maybank

20 October 2001

Harrogate	29 - 36	Rosslyn Park
	Report

Claro Road
Attendance: 325

20 October 2001

Newbury Blues	12 - 40	Plymouth Albion
	Report

Monk's Lane
Attendance: 425
Referee: David Grashoff

20 October 2001

Nottingham	34 - 20	Kendal
	Report

Ireland Avenue
Attendance: 226
Referee: Mike Hamlin

20 October 2001

Orrell	44 - 16	Wharfedale
	Report

Edge Hall Road
Attendance: 350
Referee: Rob Debney

20 October 2001

Preston Grasshoppers	18 - 21	Waterloo
	Report

Lightfoot Green
Attendance: 240

20 October 2001

Stourbridge	12 - 35	Fylde
	Report

Stourton Park
Attendance: 250

=== Round 7 ===
27 October 2001

Fylde	10 - 21	Preston Grasshoppers
	Report

Woodlands Memorial Ground
Referee: D Edmunds

27 October 2001

Kendal	32 - 14	Harrogate
	Report

Mint Bridge
Attendance: 343
Referee: David Helme

27 October 2001

Plymouth Albion	46 - 12	Nottingham
	Report

Beacon Park
Attendance: 1,840
Referee: Wayne Barnes

27 October 2001

Rosslyn Park	10 - 17	Esher
	Report

The Rock
Attendance: 750
Referee: Steve Savage

27 October 2001

Sedgley Park	25 - 12	Orrell
	Report

Park Lane
Attendance: 650

27 October 2001

Waterloo	20 - 26	Newbury Blues
	Report

St Anthony's Road
Attendance: 200
Referee: Chris Seeley

27 October 2001

Wharfedale	29 - 29	Stourbridge
	Report

The Avenue
Attendance: 500
Referee: Andrew Pearce

=== Round 8 ===
10 November 2001

Esher	22 - 25	Kendal
	Report

Molesey Road
Attendance: 150

10 November 2001

Harrogate	25 - 16	Nottingham
	Report

Claro Road
Attendance: 350

10 November 2001

Newbury Blues	16 - 29	Fylde
	Report

Monk's Lane
Attendance: 220

10 November 2001

Orrell	25 - 8	Rosslyn Park
	Report

Edge Hall Road
Attendance: 300

10 November 2001

Preston Grasshoppers	23 - 25	Wharfedale
	Report

Lightfoot Green
Attendance: 275
Referee: Chris Seeley

10 November 2001

Stourbridge	17 - 29	Sedgley Park
	Report

Stourton Park
Attendance: 300
Referee: Mike Hamlin

10 November 2001

Waterloo	0 - 37	Plymouth Albion
	Report

St Anthony's Road
Attendance: 200

=== Round 9 ===
17 November 2001

Fylde	32 - 15	Waterloo
	Report

Woodlands Memorial Ground
Attendance: 450
Referee: Chris Seeley

17 November 2001

Kendal	18 - 41	Orrell
	Report

Mint Bridge
Attendance: 728
Referee: Mark Wilson

17 November 2001

Nottingham	25 - 6	Esher
	Report

Ireland Avenue
Attendance: 284

17 November 2001

Plymouth Albion	57 - 3	Harrogate
	Report

Beacon Park
Attendance: 1,500
Referee: Steve Savage

17 November 2001

Rosslyn Park	10 - 42	Stourbridge
	Report

The Rock
Attendance: 400

17 November 2001

Sedgley Park	17 - 12	Preston Grasshoppers
	Report

Park Lane
Attendance: 350
Referee: David Matthews

17 November 2001

Wharfedale	23 - 24	Newbury Blues
	Report

The Avenue
Attendance: 400

=== Round 10 ===
24 November 2001

Esher	12 - 24	Harrogate
	Report

Molesey Road
Attendance: 200
Referee: David Sainsbury

24 November 2001

Fylde	0 - 20	Plymouth Albion
	Report

Woodlands Memorial Ground
Attendance: 400
Referee: Tim Wigglesworth

24 November 2001

Preston Grasshoppers	16 - 14	Rosslyn Park
	Report

Lightfoot Green
Attendance: 175
Referee: Mike Hamlin

24 November 2001

Stourbridge	23 - 26	Kendal
	Report

Stourton Park
Attendance: 300
Referee: Graham Hughes

24 November 2001

Waterloo	14 - 38	Wharfedale
	Report

St Anthony's Road
Attendance: 300

24 November 2001

Newbury Blues	P - P	Sedgley Park

- Postponed. Game rescheduled to 29 December 2001.

24 November 2001

Orrell	P - P	Nottingham

- Postponed. Game rescheduled to 29 December 2001.

=== Round 11 ===
1 December 2001

Esher	43 - 0	Preston Grasshoppers
	Report

Molesey Road
Attendance: 300
Referee: S Terheege

1 December 2001

Harrogate	29 - 19	Newbury Blues
	Report

Claro Road
Attendance: 300
Referee: David Matthews

1 December 2001

Kendal	27 - 18	Fylde
	Report

Mint Bridge
Attendance: 618

1 December 2001

Nottingham	35 - 5	Waterloo
	Report

Ireland Avenue
Attendance: 288
Referee: Steve Savage

1 December 2001

Orrell	43 - 16	Stourbridge
	Report

Edge Hall Road
Attendance: 600

1 December 2001

Rosslyn Park	8 - 23	Wharfedale
	Report

The Rock
Attendance: 500

1 December 2001

Sedgley Park	13 - 32	Plymouth Albion
	Report

Park Lane
Attendance: 500
Referee: David Rose

=== Round 12 ===
8 December 2001

Fylde	19 - 22	Sedgley Park
	Report

Woodlands Memorial Ground
Attendance: 450
Referee: D Edmunds

8 December 2001

Newbury Blues	23 - 22	Kendal
	Report

Monk's Lane
Referee: David Rose

8 December 2001

Orrell	41 - 7	Esher
	Report

Edge Hall Road
Attendance: 800
Referee: Mike Hamlin

8 December 2001

Preston Grasshoppers	25 - 27	Nottingham
	Report

Lightfoot Green

8 December 2001

Stourbridge	21 - 39	Harrogate
	Report

Stourton Park
Attendance: 200
Referee: Nigel Higginson

8 December 2001

Waterloo	25 - 25	Rosslyn Park
	Report

St Anthony's Road
Referee: Graham Hughes

8 December 2001

Wharfedale	28 - 20	Plymouth Albion
	Report

The Avenue
Referee: Graham Hughes

=== Round 13 ===
15 December 2001

Esher	45 - 17	Stourbridge
	Report

Molesey Road
Attendance: 300
Referee: Paul Dix

15 December 2001

Harrogate	53 - 3	Preston Grasshoppers
	Report

Claro Road
Attendance: 402
Referee: Rob Debney

15 December 2001

Kendal	37 - 17	Waterloo
	Report

Mint Bridge
Attendance: 302

15 December 2001

Nottingham	23 - 15	Newbury Blues
	Report

Ireland Avenue
Attendance: 322
Referee: Tim Wigglesworth

15 December 2001

Rosslyn Park	18 - 24	Fylde
	Report

The Rock
Attendance: 600

15 December 2001

Sedgley Park	50 - 24	Wharfedale
	Report

Park Lane
Attendance: 450
Referee: Richard Parker-Sedgmore

15 December 2001

Plymouth Albion	P - P	Orrell

- Postponed. Game rescheduled to 16 February 2002.

=== Round 14 ===
22 December 2001

Esher	15 - 22	Plymouth Albion
	Report

Molesey Road
Attendance: 500
Referee: Wayne Barnes

22 December 2001

Fylde	17 - 13	Wharfedale
	Report

Woodlands Memorial Ground
Attendance: 500
Referee: David Pearson

22 December 2001

Newbury Blues	25 - 15	Rosslyn Park
	Report

Monk's Lane
Attendance: 600
Referee: Richard Parker-Sedgmore

22 December 2001

Preston Grasshoppers	17 - 46	Kendal
	Report

Lightfoot Green
Attendance: 680
Referee: Eric Woodmason

22 December 2001

Stourbridge	32 - 22	Nottingham
	Report

Stourton Park
Attendance: 350
Referee: Martin Fox

22 December 2001

Waterloo	13 - 27	Sedgley Park

St Anthony's Road
Attendance: 278

22 December 2001

Orrell	P - P	Harrogate

- Postponed. Game rescheduled to 2 March 2002.

=== Round 10 (rescheduled games) ===
29 December 2001

Newbury Blues	9 - 7	Sedgley Park
	Report

Monk's Lane
Attendance: 250

- Game rescheduled from 24 November 2001.

29 December 2001

Orrell	52- 5	Nottingham
	Report

Edge Hall Road
Attendance: 800

- Game rescheduled from 24 November 2001.

=== Round 15 ===
5 January 2002

Plymouth Albion	28 - 5	Fylde
	Report

Beacon Park
Attendance: 2,100
Referee: Alan Biggs

5 January 2002

Harrogate	P - P	Esher

- Postponed. Game rescheduled to 16 February 2002.

5 January 2002

Kendal	P - P	Stourbridge

- Postponed. Game rescheduled to 16 February 2002.

5 January 2002

Nottingham	P - P	Orrell

- Postponed. Game rescheduled to 20 April 2002.

5 January 2002

Rosslyn Park	P - P	Preston Grasshoppers

- Postponed. Game rescheduled to 16 February 2002.

5 January 2002

Sedgley Park	P - P	Newbury Blues

- Postponed. Game rescheduled to 16 February 2002.

5 January 2002

Wharfedale	P - P	Waterloo

- Postponed. Game rescheduled to 16 February 2002.

=== Round 16 ===
12 January 2002

Esher	23 - 24	Nottingham
	Report

Molesey Road
Attendance: 300

12 January 2002

Harrogate	15 - 21	Plymouth Albion
	Report

Claro Road
Attendance: 570
Referee: Stuart Piercy

12 January 2002

Newbury Blues	30 - 21	Wharfedale
	Report

Monk's Lane
Attendance: 415
Referee: Mike Hamlin

12 January 2002

Orrell	29 - 9	Kendal
	Report

Edge Hall Road
Attendance: 700

12 January 2002

Preston Grasshoppers	18 - 37	Sedgley Park
	Report

Lightfoot Green
Attendance: 460
Referee: Alan Biggs

12 January 2002

Stourbridge	20 - 25	Rosslyn Park
	Report

Stourton Park
Attendance: 340
Referee: Paul Dix

12 January 2002

Waterloo	10 - 20	Fylde
	Report

St Anthony's Road
Attendance: 235

=== Round 17 ===
19 January 2002

Fylde	39 - 3	Newbury Blues
	Report

Woodlands Memorial Ground
Referee: Paul Dix

19 January 2002

Kendal	12 - 14	Esher
	Report

Mint Bridge
Attendance: 336
Referee: David Rose

19 January 2002

Nottingham	5 - 24	Harrogate
	Report

Ireland Avenue
Attendance: 382

19 January 2002

Plymouth Albion	43 - 15	Waterloo
	Report

Beacon Park
Attendance: 1,205
Referee: Tim Miller

19 January 2002

Rosslyn Park	11 - 31	Orrell
	Report

The Rock
Attendance: 600

19 January 2002

Sedgley Park	34 - 24	Stourbridge
	Report

Park Lane
Attendance: 350
Referee: Steve Savage

19 January 2002

Wharfedale	59 - 8	Preston Grasshoppers
	Report

The Avenue
Attendance: 400
Referee: Trevor Fisher

=== Round 18 ===
26 January 2002

Esher	17 - 16	Rosslyn Park
	Report

Molesey Road
Attendance: 350
Referee: Nigel Higginson

26 January 2002

Harrogate	25 - 12	Kendal
	Report

Claro Road
Attendance: 493
Referee: D Edmunds

26 January 2002

Newbury Blues	22 - 20	Waterloo
	Report

Monk's Lane
Attendance: 250
Referee: Andrew Pearce

26 January 2002

Nottingham	13 - 26	Plymouth Albion
	Report

Ireland Avenue
Attendance: 342
Referee: Steve Savage

26 January 2002

Orrell	43 - 16	Sedgley Park
	Report

Edge Hall Road
Attendance: 1,100
Referee: Trevor Fisher

26 January 2002

Preston Grasshoppers	5 - 17	Fylde
	Report

Lightfoot Green
Attendance: 495
Referee: Chris Seeley

26 January 2002

Stourbridge	P - P	Wharfedale

- Postponed. Game rescheduled to 2 March 2002.

=== Round 19 ===
2 February 2002

Fylde	33 - 20	Stourbridge
	Report

Woodlands Memorial Ground
Attendance: 300

2 February 2002

Kendal	30 - 32	Nottingham
	Report

Mint Bridge
Attendance: 232

2 February 2002

Plymouth Albion	57 - 10	Newbury Blues
	Report

Beacon Park
Attendance: 1,080
Referee: S Terheege

2 February 2002

Rosslyn Park	17 - 20	Harrogate
	Report

The Rock
Attendance: 300

2 February 2002

Sedgley Park	20 - 16	Esher
	Report

Park Lane
Attendance: 350
Referee: Wayne Barnes

2 February 2002

Waterloo	34 - 22	Preston Grasshoppers
	Report

St Anthony's Road
Attendance: 200
Referee: Tim Wigglesworth

2 February 2002

Wharfedale	8 - 18	Orrell
	Report

The Avenue
Attendance: 500
Referee: Rob Debney

=== Round 20 ===
9 February 2002

Esher	13 - 17	Wharfedale
	Report

Molesey Road
Referee: D May

9 February 2002

Harrogate	10 - 13	Sedgley Park
	Report

Claro Road
Attendance: 487
Referee: Mike Hamlin

9 February 2002

Kendal	0 - 7	Plymouth Albion
	Report

Mint Bridge
Referee: David Matthews

9 February 2002

Nottingham	11 - 30	Rosslyn Park
	Report

Ireland Avenue

9 February 2002

Orrell	46 - 6	Fylde
	Report

Edge Hall Road
Attendance: 800
Referee: David Rose

9 February 2002

Stourbridge	18 - 14	Waterloo
	Report

Stourton Park
Attendance: 250
Referee: Sean Davey

9 February 2002

Preston Grasshoppers	P - P	Newbury Blues

- Postponed. Game rescheduled to 2 March 2002.

=== Rounds 13 & 15 (rescheduled games) ===
16 February 2002

Harrogate	34 - 23	Esher
	Report

Claro Road
Attendance: 263
Referee: Martin Fox

- Game rescheduled from 5 January 2002.

16 February 2002

Kendal	31 - 13	Stourbridge
	Report

Mint Bridge
Attendance: 284
Referee: Chris Seeley

- Game rescheduled from 5 January 2002.

16 February 2002

Plymouth Albion	14 - 20	Orrell
	Report

Beacon Park
Attendance: 2,042
Referee: David Pearson

- Game rescheduled from 15 December 2001.

16 February 2002

Rosslyn Park	43 - 17	Preston Grasshoppers
	Report

The Rock
Attendance: 175
Referee: Wayne Barnes

- Game rescheduled from 5 January 2002.

16 February 2002

Sedgley Park	32 - 24	Newbury Blues
	Report

Park Lane
Attendance: 250
Referee: Tim Wigglesworth

- Game rescheduled from 5 January 2002.

16 February 2002

Wharfedale	37 - 27	Waterloo
	Report

The Avenue
Attendance: 450

- Game rescheduled from 5 January 2002.

=== Round 21 ===
23 February 2002

Fylde	13 - 27	Esher
	Report

Woodlands Memorial Ground
Attendance: 500
Referee: Eric Woodmason

23 February 2002

Newbury Blues	31 - 20	Stourbridge
	Report

Monk's Lane
Attendance: 445
Referee: Nick Cousins

23 February 2002

Plymouth Albion	66 - 12	Preston Grasshoppers
	Report

Beacon Park
Attendance: 1,200
Referee: Richard Parker-Sedgmore

23 February 2002

Rosslyn Park	26 - 3	Kendal
	Report

The Rock
Attendance: 550
Referee: Nigel Higginson

23 February 2002

Sedgley Park	25 - 16	Nottingham
	Report

Park Lane
Attendance: 240
Referee: Paul Dix

23 February 2002

Waterloo	16 - 27	Orrell
	Report

St Anthony's Road
Attendance: 300
Referee: Alan Biggs

23 February 2002

Wharfedale	6 - 6	Harrogate
	Report

The Avenue
Attendance: 600
Referee: Tim Wigglesworth

=== Rounds 14, 18 & 20 (rescheduled games) ===
2 March 2002

Orrell	40 - 24	Harrogate
	Report

Edge Hall Road
Attendance: 700
Referee: S Terheege

- Game rescheduled from 22 December 2001.

2 March 2002

Preston Grasshoppers	24 - 54	Newbury Blues
	Report

Lightfoot Green
Attendance: 85

- Game rescheduled from 9 February 2002.

2 March 2002

Stourbridge	41 - 42	Wharfedale
	Report

Stourton Park
Attendance: 100
Referee: Nick Williams

- Game rescheduled from 26 January 2002.

=== Round 22 ===
9 March 2002

Esher	33 - 26	Waterloo
	Report

Molesey Road
Referee: Tim Miller

9 March 2002

Harrogate	43 - 0	Fylde
	Report

Claro Road
Attendance: 317
Referee: D Edmunds

9 March 2002

Kendal	12 - 23	Sedgley Park
	Report

Mint Bridge
Attendance: 350
Referee: David Rose

9 March 2002

Nottingham	21 - 9	Wharfedale
	Report

Ireland Avenue
Attendance: 406
Referee: Stuart Piercy

9 March 2002

Orrell	57 - 7	Newbury Blues
	Report

Edge Hall Road
Attendance: 700
Referee: David Grashoff

9 March 2002

Rosslyn Park	13 - 41	Plymouth Albion
	Report

The Rock
Referee: S Terheege

9 March 2002

Stourbridge	32 - 7	Preston Grasshoppers
	Report

Stourton Park
Attendance: 280
Referee: Paul Dix

=== Round 23 ===
16 March 2002

Fylde	13 - 30	Nottingham
	Report

Woodlands Memorial Ground
Attendance: 500
Referee: Alan Hughes

16 March 2002

Newbury Blues	22 - 24	Esher
	Report

Monk's Lane
Attendance: 485
Referee: Mike Hamlin

16 March 2002

Plymouth Albion	23 - 16	Stourbridge
	Report

Beacon Park
Attendance: 1,550
Referee: Eric Woodmason

16 March 2002

Preston Grasshoppers	8 - 67	Orrell
	Report

Lightfoot Green
Attendance: 620
Referee: David Matthews

16 March 2002

Sedgley Park	26 - 19	Rosslyn Park
	Report

Park Lane
Attendance: 250
Referee: Graham Hughes

16 March 2002

Waterloo	21 - 26	Harrogate
	Report

St Anthony's Road
Attendance: 100
Referee: Chris Seeley

16 March 2002

Wharfedale	22 - 21	Kendal
	Report

The Avenue
Attendance: 500
Referee: Steve Savage

=== Round 24 ===
30 March 2002

Harrogate	21 - 29	Orrell
	Report

Claro Road
Attendance: 722
Referee: David Sainsbury

30 March 2002

Kendal	48 - 8	Preston Grasshoppers
	Report

Mint Bridge
Attendance: 628
Referee: Chris Seeley

30 March 2002

Nottingham	29 - 12	Stourbridge
	Report

Ireland Avenue
Attendance: 521
Referee: Richard Parker-Sedgmore

30 March 2002

Plymouth Albion	57 - 0	Esher
	Report

Beacon Park
Attendance: 1,300

30 March 2002

Rosslyn Park	25 - 23	Newbury Blues
	Report

The Rock
Attendance: 600

30 March 2002

Sedgley Park	20 - 20	Waterloo
	Report

Park Lane
Attendance: 350

30 March 2002

Wharfedale	21 - 27	Fylde
	Report

The Avenue
Attendance: 500
Referee: S Makinson

=== Round 25 ===
6 April 2002

Fylde	26 - 22	Rosslyn Park
	Report

Woodlands Memorial Ground
Attendance: 300
Referee: Eric Woodmason

6 April 2002

Newbury Blues	16 - 12	Nottingham
	Report

Monk's Lane
Attendance: 275
Referee: Daniel Jabase

6 April 2002

Orrell	37 - 13	Plymouth Albion
	Report

Edge Hall Road
Attendance: 1,300
Referee: Robin Goodliffe

6 April 2002

Preston Grasshoppers	24 - 62	Harrogate
	Report

Lightfoot Green
Attendance: 95
Referee: Graham Hughes

6 April 2002

Stourbridge	45 - 19	Esher
	Report

Stourton Park
Attendance: 300
Referee: Chris Sharp

6 April 2002

Waterloo	27 - 20	Kendal
	Report

St Anthony's Road
Attendance: 300

6 April 2002

Wharfedale	3 - 33	Sedgley Park
	Report

The Avenue
Attendance: 650
Referee: David Matthews

=== Round 26 ===
13 April 2002

Esher	12 - 45	Orrell
	Report

Molesey Road
Attendance: 400
Referee: D May

13 April 2002

Harrogate	45 - 15	Stourbridge
	Report

Claro Road
Attendance: 329
Referee: Graham Hughes

13 April 2002

Kendal	22 - 35	Newbury Blues
	Report

Mint Bridge
Attendance: 450
Referee: Mike Hamlin

13 April 2002

Nottingham	63 - 10	Preston Grasshoppers
	Report

Ireland Avenue
Attendance: 346
Referee: Tim Wigglesworth

13 April 2002

Plymouth Albion	45 - 3	Wharfedale
	Report

Beacon Park
Attendance: 1,800
Referee: Sean Davey

13 April 2002

Rosslyn Park	33 - 14	Waterloo
	Report

The Rock
Attendance: 600

13 April 2002

Sedgley Park	37 - 15	Fylde
	Report

Park Lane
Attendance: 550
Referee: Trevor Fisher

=== Round 15 (rescheduled game) ===
20 April 2002

Nottingham	15 - 66	Orrell
	Report

Ireland Avenue
Attendance: 546
Referee: J Barnard

- Game rescheduled from 5 January 2002.

== Total season attendances ==
Club	Home Games	Total	Average	Highest	Lowest	% Capacity
Esher	11 (Note: Missing home attendances v Wharfedale on 9 February 2002 & Waterloo on 9 March 2002.)	3,600	327	500	150	11%
Fylde	11 (Note: Missing home attendances v Preston on 27 October 2001 & Newbury on 19 January 2002.)	4,850	441	500	300	6%
Harrogate	13	5,829	448	784	263	10%
Kendal	12 (Note: Missing home attendance v Plymouth on 27 October 2001.)	5,121	427	728	232	9%
Newbury Blues	12 (Note: Missing home attendance v Kendal on 8 December 2001.)	4,765	397	720	220	5%
Nottingham	12 (Note: Missing home attendance v Rosslyn Park on 9 February 2002.)	4,185	349	546	211	7%
Orrell	13	9,300	715	1,300	300	13%
Plymouth Albion	12 (Note: Missing home attendance v Kendal on 6 October 2001.)	19,117	1,593	2,100	1,080	46%
Preston Grasshoppers	12 (Note: Missing home attendance v Nottingham on 8 December 2001.)	3,995	333	680	85	7%
Rosslyn Park	12 (Note: Missing home attendance v Plymouth on 9 March 2002.)	6,175	515	750	175	26%
Sedgley Park	13	5,415	417	800	240	14%
Stourbridge	13	4,520	348	700	100	10%
Waterloo	12 (Note: Missing home attendance v Rosslyn Park on 8 December 2001.)	2,998	250	464	100	3%
Wharfedale	12 (Note: Missing home attendance v Plymouth in December 2001.)	5,750	479	650	400	24%

== Individual statistics ==
- Note that points scorers includes tries as well as conversions, penalties and drop goals.

=== Top points scorers ===
Rank	Player	Team	Appearances	Points
1	(England) Phil Jones	Orrell	26	343
2	(England) Jonathon Gregory	Esher	26	311
3	(England) Ben Harvey	Stourbridge	25	298
4	(England) Lee Cholewa	Harrogate	26	284
5	(England) Jonathon Davies	Wharfedale	26	278
6	(England) Mike Scott	Kendal	26	271
7	(England) Colin Stephens	Sedgley Park	21	244
8	(England) Tom Barlow	Plymouth	26	211
9	(England) Chris Glynn	Preston Grasshoppers	25	210
10	(England) Russell Southam	Nottingham	17	203

=== Top try scorers ===
Rank	Player	Team	Appearances	Tries
1	(England) Dan Ward-Smith	Plymouth Albion	26	23
2	(England) Neil Kerfoot	Orrell	23	19
2	(Scotland) Andy Craig	Orrell	25	19
3	(England) John Dudley	Harrogate	25	16
3	(England) Freeman Payne	Waterloo	26	16
4	(England) Phil Jones	Orrell	26	15
4	(England) Andrew Hodgson	Wharfedale	25	15
5	(Wales) Wes Davies	Orrell	15	13
6	(England) Ross Bullough	Sedgley Park	15	12
6	(England) Rob Moon	Sedgley Park	17	12

== Season records ==
=== Team ===
Largest home win — 57 pts

92 - 0 Plymouth Albion at home to Esher on 30 March 2002

Largest away win — 59 pts

67 - 8 Orrell away to Preston Grasshoppers on 16 March 2002

Most points scored — 67 pts

67 - 8 Orrell away to Preston Grasshoppers on 16 March 2002

Most tries in a match — 11

Orrell away to Preston Grasshoppers on 16 March 2002

Most conversions in a match — 8 (x2)

Plymouth Albion at home to Preston Grasshoppers on 23 February 2002
Orrell away to Nottingham on 20 April 2002

Most penalties in a match — 8

Esher at home to Preston Grasshoppers on 1 December 2001

Most drop goals in a match — 2 (x2)

Kendal away to Esher on 10 November 2001
Sedgley park away to Fylde on 1 December 2001

=== Player ===
Most points in a match — 30 (x2)

(England) Colin Stephens for Sedgley Park at home to Wharfedale on 15 December 2001
(England) Ben Harvey for Stourbridge at home to Esher on 6 April 2002

Most tries in a match — 4

(England) Mark Farrar for Harrogate against Preston Grasshoppers on 6 April 2002

Most conversions in a match — 8 (x2)

(England) Chris Atkinson for Plymouth Albion at home to Preston Grasshoppers on 23 February 2002
(England) Richard Welding for Orrell away to Nottingham on 20 April 2002

Most penalties in a match — 8

(England) Jonathon Gregory for Esher at home to Preston Grasshoppers on 1 December 2001

Most drop goals in a match — 2 (x2)

(England) Mike Scott for Kendal away to Esher on 10 November 2001
(England) Colin Stephens for Sedgley park away to Fylde on 1 December 2001

=== Attendances ===
Highest — 2,100

Plymouth Albion at home to Fylde on 5 January 2002

Lowest — 85

Preston Grasshoppers at home to Newbury Blues on 2 March 2002

Highest Average Attendance — 1,593

Plymouth Albion

Lowest Average Attendance — 250

Waterloo

== See also ==
- English Rugby Union Leagues
- English rugby union system
- Rugby union in England
