= Fran Clough =

England international rugby union player

- Born: 1 November 1962 (age 64) Wigan, Greater Manchester
- University: Cambridge University

Rugby union career
- Position: Centre
Senior career
Years	Team	Apps	(Points)
- Orrell R.U.F.C.
–	Wasps RFC		
–	Bedford Blues		
International career
Years	Team	Apps	(Points)
1986-1987	England	4	

Francis John Clough is a retired England rugby union player who played as a centre four times for England in the period 1986-7, including the 1987 Rugby World Cup. He was born November 1, 1962, in Wigan. He played rugby league for England Schoolboys in 1979. Clough initially studied at Durham University, where he made appearances for Durham University RFC and graduated with a degree in Applied Physics in 1984. He moved on to Cambridge – at the time it was commonplace for Cambridge to recruit Durham graduates to represent Cambridge University RFC.

Brian Moore once placed him in his all time touring 15. During his career he played club rugby for Orrell R.U.F.C., Wasps RFC and Bedford Blues.

Fran Clough is the Surmaster at St Paul’s School, London.
