= Dan Ward-Smith =

NZ rugby union player

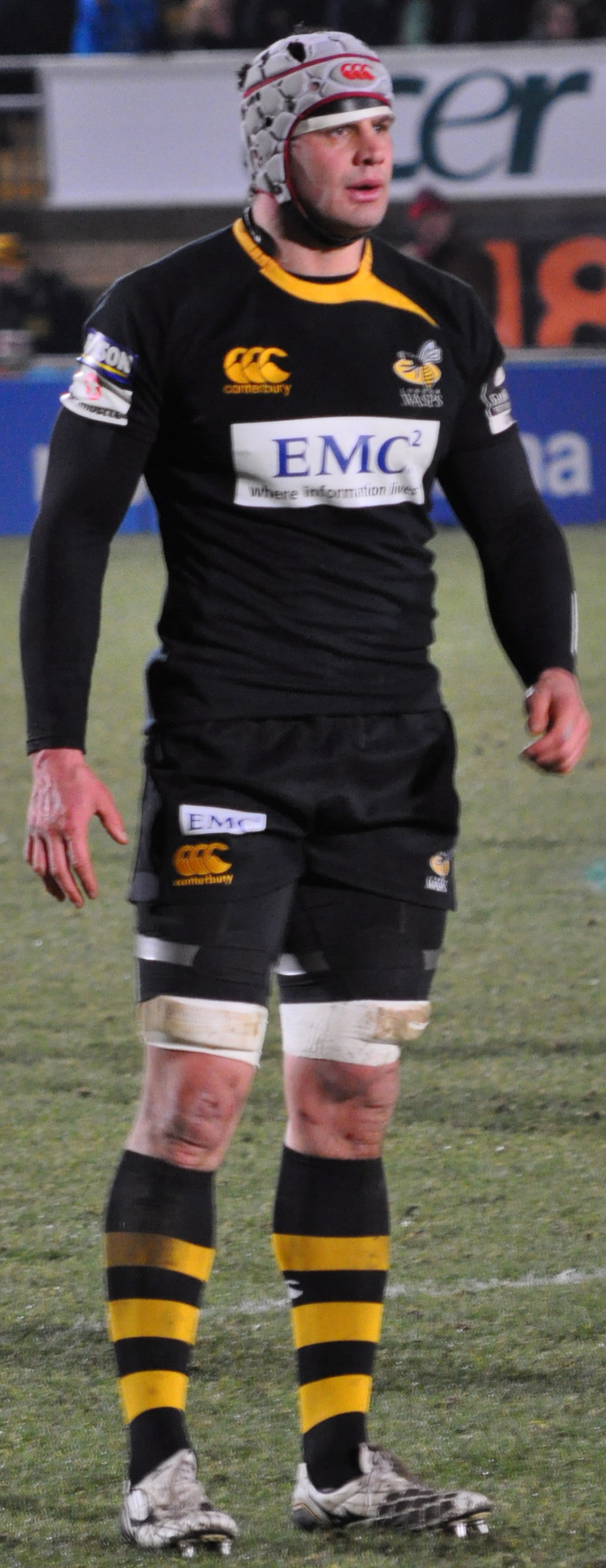
- Born: Daniel Ward-Smith; 2 January 1978 (age 48) Palmerston North, New Zealand
- Height: 1.93 m (6 ft 4 in)
- Weight: 112 kg (17 st 9 lb)
- School: Budehaven Community College; Waiopehu College; Awatapu College
- University: Massey University

Rugby union career
Amateur team(s)
Years	Team	Apps	(Points)
- Launceston RUFC
–	Kia Toa		
–	Palmerston North Marist		
Senior career
Years	Team	Apps	(Points)
1999–2005	Plymouth Albion	138	(480)
2005–2009	Bristol	84	(40)
2009–2011	London Wasps	49	(25)
Provincial / State sides
Years	Team	Apps	(Points)
1999	Manawatu	12	
International career
Years	Team	Apps	(Points)
2006	England A		

Daniel Ward-Smith (born 2 January 1978) is a former New Zealand-born English rugby union player who played at number eight for Bristol & London Wasps. He also covered flanker and second row, which made him a massive forward to have in the Wasps squad.

Ward-Smith was born in Palmerston North but spent his early childhood in Cornwall in the United Kingdom. He moved back to his hometown with his family when he was 13.

After attending both Awatapu College and Waiopehu College he studied at Massey University.

== Career ==
=== New Zealand ===
Ward-Smith has played for Manawatu under-19s and played all twelve provincial games for Manawatu in 1999. Ward-Smith was selected in the NPC XV for that year.

He made two appearances representing the New Zealand Maori Colts, with the aim of achieving a Super Rugby contract with the Wellington Hurricanes. However Ward-Smith eventually pursued a Rugby Career in the UK due to having dual Nationality.

=== England ===
Ward-Smith travelled to the UK on a short-term contract with Plymouth Albion. While playing rugby in a local cup tie in Devon he suffered an ankle ligament injury which ended thoughts of an immediate return to a contract in pro rugby back in New Zealand.

As a result, Plymouth Albion gave Ward-Smith the offer of rugby in tier 4 of the English club game and in 2000-01 he was part of the all conquering Albion team under the tutelage of Graham Dawe that took the league title with a perfect record of 26 wins out of 26, with Ward-Smith finishing as joint top try scorer in the division with 20 tries. A second successive promotion followed at Albion during the 2001-02 season where the club finished second to Orrell with Ward-Smith again becoming top try scorer in the division, this time with 23 tries.

Having helped Plymouth achieve stability in tier 2 in a spell in which he scored almost 100 tries, Ward-Smith caught the eye of Bristol, which he signed for the 2005-6 campaign and looked to make a huge impression in his first season in the Premiership.

He was selected for England 'A' in his first season at Bristol, making his debut against Ireland A. In his second season at the club he was called up to the 30-man England training squad for the Autumn Internationals.

He missed out on a place in the 2007 England World Cup squad due to a ruptured patella tendon after being part of the initial training squad.

Ward-Smith was named in The Guinness Premiership Team of the Year for the 2006-2007 season as Bristol finished third.

After a promising start to the 2007–08 season with Bristol he broke his hand and missed out on selection for the 2008 Six Nations squad.

It was announced on 24 March 2009 that he had signed a 4-year deal with London Wasps. On 7 July 2009; Ward-Smith was selected for the England Saxons squad. He had been selected for the 2010 tour to the southern hemisphere. However he did not play in the Test Matches but made appearances in the 4 non test fixtures. Notably Ward-Smith featured against The Barbarians at Twickenham and was the first person of Maori heritage to play against NZ Maori when he appeared for England in Napier in a fixture that celebrated 100 years of NZ Maori Rugby.

=== Retirement ===
In August 2011 he announced immediate retirement from the game due to medical advice.

== Honours ==
Plymouth Albion

- National Division 3 South champions: 2000-01
- National Division 3 South (joint) top try scorer (20 tries): 2000-01
- National Division 2 top try scorer (23 tries): 2001-02

International/Representative

- Represented New Zealand Maori Colts
- Represented England Saxons
