= Frank Anderson (rugby union) =

English rugby union player

- Full name: William Francis Anderson
- Born: 1945 (age 80–81) Ormskirk, England

Rugby union career
- Position: Prop
International career
| Years | Team | Apps | (Points) |
| 1973 | England | 1 | (0) |

William Francis Anderson (born 1945) is an English former rugby union international.

Born in Ormskirk, Anderson was educated at Hutton Grammar School.

Anderson, a prop, played his early rugby at Southport and Ormskirk, before making his way to Orrell in the late 1960s. He was part of an Orrell team that dominated Lancashire rugby and was the club's first international representative. His solitary England cap came against the All Blacks at Twickenham in 1973, having earlier helped North-Western Counties upset the visiting side in a tour match at Workington.

== See also ==
- List of England national rugby union players
