= Drew Hickey =

Australian rugby player

- Born: Sydney, Australia
- Height: 6 ft 3 in (1.91 m)
- Weight: 103 kg (227 lb)
- School: St Joseph's College, Hunters Hill
- University: Sydney University

Rugby union career
- Position(s): Number 8, blindside flanker
Senior career
Years	Team	Apps	(Points)
1996–2002	Sydney University		
2000–02	New South Wales Waratahs		
2002–03	Orrell		
2003–08	Worcester	102	(45)
2008–11	Kubota Spears	12	(10)
Coaching career
- Years: Team
- 1: Sydney University 2nd Grade

Drew Hickey (born in Sydney) is a former Australian Rugby Union player who played blindside flanker and Number 8. In February 2008, he moved to Japan to play for Kubota Spears in Japan's Top League Hickey joined Worcester Warriors in the Summer of 2003 and was an integral part of propelling the team into the Guinness Premiership in 2004. He formerly played for Orrell R.U.F.C., the New South Wales Waratahs and club side Sydney University.

Hickey has also notably played for Australian under 19s, Australian 21s and Australian sevens.

Post professional rugby Hickey is now coaching 2nd grade Sydney University Football Club and works as a Financial Advisor.
