= Orrell R.U.F.C. =

English rugby union club, based in Wigan

Orrell
- Full name: Orrell Rugby Union Football Club
- Union: Lancashire RFU
- Nickname(s): The Anvils, The Black & Ambers
- Founded: 1927; 99 years ago
- Location: Orrell, Greater Manchester, England
- Ground: St John Rigby
- Chairman: David Robinson
- Captain: (England) Daniel Huxley esq
- League: Lancs/Cheshire Division Two
- 2023-24: 6th
Team kit

Official website
- www.pitchero.com/clubs/orrellrugbyunion/

Orrell Rugby Union Football Club is a rugby union club from Orrell in the Metropolitan Borough of Wigan, Greater Manchester.

The club was founded in 1927, holding a place in the top-tier of rugby union from 1986 to 1997.

== History ==
=== Founding and early years ===
Orrell Rugby Union Football Club was founded in 1927 by a group of friends from Orrell and neighbouring Pemberton who travelled daily by train to Liverpool. One of the stops on that journey was at Rainford where some young men from that village joined the train. The talk and banter was often about rugby and eventually a challenge was issued by the men from Rainford, and of course duly taken up. In such circumstances was Orrell Rugby Union Football Club born.

In those early days, the club led a very nomadic existence with grounds in Kitt Green, Orrell Mount, Abbey Lakes, Alma Hill and Up Holland, and men could be seen most Saturdays carrying rugby posts and sawdust to mark out the pitch in one locality or another before they eventually settled at the YMCA cricket ground in Winstanley Road.

=== Second World War and 1950s ===
The Second World War forced the suspension of the club, but as soon as hostilities ceased Orrell RUFC was re-constituted. With rapid growth in playing membership, new premises were sought and a site at Edge Hall Road was purchased in 1950, an ex-army hut being used as changing accommodation. Orrell soon developed a reputation on the field that was as much respected as it was feared, but improvements in the fixture list were not easily come by as they were told by side after side that they would play, but only if others played them also.

=== 1960s and 1970s ===
On the field, Orrell began to do very well indeed. Between 1961 and 1966 they played 139 games with only 14 defeats. In September 1968, Orrell became the first club in Lancashire to erect floodlights, enabling the club to play in mid-week. The 1970s saw Orrell's success continue: In the 1970–71 season they played 42 games and only lost 4 of those. In 1971–72 they won the resurrected Lancashire Cup without conceding a point, which also qualified them to take part in the following season's National Knockout Competition. In the second round they defeated the famous Harlequins and received wide press coverage, prompting the famous quote 'beaten by a lay-by off the M6!' With eight teams representing Orrell at various levels in 1973, re-building began to add extra changing rooms, a gym and a kitchen. This work was finished in 1974 being officially opened on 4 April that year by the RFU President Micky Steele-Bodger.

=== 1980s ===
In the 1980s Orrell had some memorable moments, winning the Lancashire cup for the 6th time in 8 years in the 1981–82 season. They finished 2nd in the Northern merit table in 1982–83 and were quarter finalists in the National Knockout Cup in successive seasons. In 1984–85 season they entered the record books setting a new record for the number of points scored in a season by an English club - 1295. Their consistency in the merit tables was recognised and Orrell joined the new Courage League set up in 1986–87 finishing 6th in 1987–88 and 4th in 1988–89. The club continued to go from strength to strength, reaching the Pilkington Cup semi and quarter finals on a number of occasions. They were an ever-present in the English First Division until 1997, and finished runners up to Bath in 1991–92, losing the title on the final day of the season following defeat by Wasps. The club built its strength on its commitment to junior rugby and bringing players up 'through the ranks', many of whom played for the first team and achieved representative honours.

Orrell always supported the Lancashire cause and was the backbone of the county side for many years, with the club itself becoming synonymous with the Red Rose success supplying many players including great county captains in Des Seabrook and Sammy Southern. During the re-introduction of Divisional rugby in the late 1980s, Orrell were well represented. For the game against the U.S.A. Eagles in 1989, Simon Langford, Gerry Ainscough, Sammy Southern, Neil Hitchen and Bob Kimmins were in the side that day. Between 1967 and 1987 Orrell won the Glengarth Sevens at Stockport RUFC a record 8 times.

On the international stage, Nigel Heslop, Gerry Ainscough, Neil Hitchen and Bob Kimmins were selected in the England 'B' side against Spain in 1989. Frank Anderson, Peter Williams, Fran Clough, Dave Cusani, Nigel Heslop, and Phil Jones have represented England, whilst playing for the Black with Ambers. John Carleton and Dewi Morris have also played for the British Lions. Simon Mason represented Ireland, Steven So'oialo and Opeta Palepoi, Samoa with Andy Craig capped for Scotland.

=== Impact of rugby union becoming a professional sport ===
The advent of the professional game hit the club hard. Poor financial management plunged the club into debt, and as figures began to spiral out of control, the club made the conscious decision at the beginning of the 1996–97 season to spend only what it could afford. By steadfastly refusing to chase the big-spending monied outfits, the club was faced with the mass exodus of sixteen of their first team squad. They were inevitably relegated.

Unable to return to the elite at the first time of asking, Orrell suffered a severe reduction in income and, as the financial screws began to tighten, a drastic re-appraisal of the financial and rugby structure of the club was carried out. Still refusing to mortgage their assets in an attempt to keep up with more wealthy competitors they decided to cut their cloth accordingly. The whole squad moved to part-time. The club managed to hang on at the second level until, despite a last-day home victory over London Welsh, a convenient draw between Otley and Bedford saved the status of both teams, seeing Orrell relegated to National Division Two at the end of the 2000–01 season.

Following relegation from the top flight, some club members, concerned about the diminishing level of senior rugby being played at Orrell, got together to re-form the Orrell third XV. The following year, the side was formally registered with the RFU as Orrell Anvils, a purely amateur side with good relations with the professional set-up, and entered the RFU league structure as a new side in the South Lancashire and Cheshire league. In the first league season 1998–99, with a very young side, the Anvils missed out on promotion by a single point, and part way through the season Colin Nicholson having been asked to coach the professional 2nd XV, passed on the coaching responsibility to a current coaching team headed by Tony Pegg. Recruitment of additional players took place during the summer of 1999, adding a number of experienced players to the existing squad of promising younger players. This blend of youth and experience saw the Anvils go through the 1999–2000 season unbeaten, winning the league and scoring over 500 points in 10 games by playing an expansive and attractive game.

Places in the side was strong, with a squad of over 30 players, yet team spirit remained high. Players with extensive first-team experience, such as Jeff Huxley, Nigel Heslop, Steve Taberner, Micky Glynn, and Dick Fisher, played alongside promising young players like Paul Engwell, Andy Carroll, David Honor, Mike Caldwell, and Ricky Rimmer.

The Anvils became the ideal vehicle for senior players—who had perhaps grown weary of the pressures and demands of 1st XV rugby but still wanted to enjoy the game—to pass on their experience to younger players aiming to progress to a higher level. From this perspective, the Anvils became an integral part of the Orrell setup and saw players go on to represent the 2nd and 1st teams.

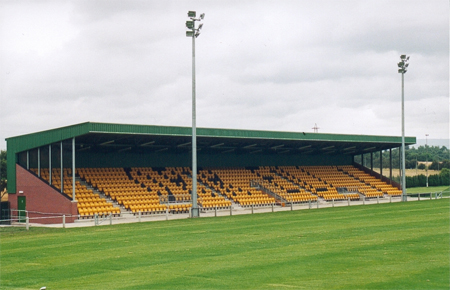
The £500,000 north stand contributed heavily to the club's financial troubles

=== Investment by Dave Whelan ===
With the real possibility of not having enough players to start the 2001–02 season the Orrell directors decided that something had to be done. Wigan Warriors' Rugby League Club Chairman Maurice Lindsay and business tycoon Dave Whelan, the then owner of the JJB Sports empire, had already been making noises about forming a rugby union side. Initial contact was made via Whelan's Finance Director Simon Moorehead and an exciting night saw the members promised £10,000,000 investment over 5 years, with Mr Whelan expressing the dream to be drinking red wine away to Toulouse in the European Cup in the not-too-distant future. With these promises of future success, the members reluctantly sold their shares in the club for £1,000 each, to the new owners, with Lindsay becoming the club's new chairman.

Immediate changes were seen, not all of them universally popular with the former members, but Orrell began to prosper again. Most of the players who had been looking elsewhere were persuaded to stay, and some players were recruited.

Under the management of Sammy Southern as director of rugby, assisted by Bill Lyon, the team beat main rivals Plymouth Albion both home and away and took the league title at Nottingham, beating the home side 66–15, and were immediately promoted back to National One. Southern left at the end of the season.

During the close season, former Australian International flank-forward Ross Reynolds was appointed as head coach, most of the previous season's squad re-signed and further reinforcements were drafted-in with the signing of Samoan scrum half Stephen So'oialo, hooker Mike Howe from Newcastle, Steve Barretto a prop from Leinster, Drew Hickey a super 12 player from Australia, Simon Haughton, another rugby league international out of the Warriors stable, and Steve Moore a Welsh international lock. They went full-time at the end of the season and set their sights on Premiership rugby. With a new side coming together they had a disastrous opening month but then things improved, with them only losing one more league game throughout the campaign to finish a creditable 4th. Their season highlight was a 20–13 win over Exeter in the Powergen Shield final at Twickenham.

Off the field, Orrell's clubhouse was destroyed by arson in the early hours of Monday 12 August 2002, before the season had even begun but ominously as it proved, there was no rush by the new owners to rebuild. Irreplaceable items were lost, including representative and international shirts that had been donated to the club by former players, and the trophy cabinet containing much of the club's silverware.

Reynolds strengthened the side with various changes to the coaching and playing staff. Another successful season followed, losing only four games and finishing second to Worcester. Hopes were high that one more season would see them in the Premiership. With expectations high it came as a cruel blow that backer David Whelan decided to withdraw his investment after promising supporters that he was in for the 'long haul.' News following a meeting seeking clarification of Whelan's exact intentions, revealed that he was giving ownership of the clubhouse and the first team pitch over to Wigan Warriors Rugby League Club, but offered a 25-year lease to Orrell at a prohibitively expensive rent. He also announced that his £30,000 per annum sponsorship of the club through his JJB Sports Store empire would cease at the end of the 2004/2005 season.

=== Return to ownership by members ===
Following Dave Whelan's announcement that he would no longer back Orrell in early 2004, a takeover bid was launched by a South African consortium led by millionaire businessman Johann Rupert. The intention was to relocate the club to QPR's Loftus Road stadium and brand the new venture London Tribe. However, the offer was refused and Orrell was handed back to its members in the Summer of 2004.

The decision had immediate effect as nearly the whole squad and coaching staff left for pastures new and with little interest being shown by the management, there was a real danger that the club could fold. In the end, Sale Sharks Assistant Coach Mark Nelson took over coaching duties and assembled a squad with Richard Wilks had appointed as Club Captain. Unfortunately it was late and the side began the season both underpowered and under-prepared. The frailties were immediately exposed and although they managed a draw away at Bedford with the help of players on loan from Sale Sharks, the arrangement with the Premiership club was less than successful with Orrell not knowing from one week to the next who was going to be available. They were relegated to National Two that season.

Although relegation was inevitable, it was to the club's great relief that towards the end of the season, the rebuilt clubhouse was opened, following almost three seasons without one. With the club reverting to a members committee, whose intention was to return Orrell to a 'proper' rugby club, former Irish international Simon Mason was appointed as full-time Director of Rugby with the brief of 'kick starting' the revival, the hope initially being one of consolidation in National Division Two. Although a sizable number of the previous season's squad had promised to stay, they subsequently left, leaving Mason and assistant Mike Howe to start, yet again, from square one. They began the season with a very young and inexperienced squad, and while they matured significantly it was a case of too little, too late and another relegation for the club. Whelan also limited Orrell's use of the clubhouse to matchdays-only, preventing any significant form of revenue generation.

Coach Mason was lured away by better financial prospects at Caldy, and the club appointed Chris Chudleigh as their new coach, joining the club from the British Army where he held the rank of captain. He worked as the Army Officer responsible for introducing and developing the military's sporting strategic initiatives in schools and youth organisations, nationwide, as part of the policy to introduce young people to a potential career in the Army. However, a lack of cash meant that few players remained from the previous season's National Two campaign, and while Fijians and Army players were brought in together with some talented young South Africans (like Jimmy Baloyi and Sibu Ndungane) and New Zealanders, the team struggled to excel.

As Orrell no longer owned Edge Hall Road, they had to train at a local college and to compound difficulties, they were deducted six league points by the RFU for playing two unregistered players at the beginning of the season against Morley. Off the field circumstances became similarly bleak, the club are having to use the local Station Hotel as their headquarters, with the memorabilia that was left after the fire, transferred from the brand new clubhouse which Dave Whelan and Maurice Lindsay were no longer allowing them to use. It sat disused for 7 months before Wigan Warriors converted it into a high performance training centre in January 2007. A threadbare committee devoted as much of their spare time to the running of the club. This proved extremely difficult, as Chairman Tony Pegg was frequently travelling internationally, Treasurer Simon 'Chappers' Chapman was suffering with cancer, and a recent University graduate was managing the media and commercial areas from his bedroom. With no assets to appeal to sponsors, attracting investment to the ailing club was virtually impossible.

By the half-way point of the season, Orrell still had not won a game, and with this back-drop, the side started to break up, with many departing playing being replaced by university students. A members meeting confirmed the overwhelming feeling that the club should at least look into the possibility of moving elsewhere at the end of the season, providing a suitable location could be found.

=== Return to amateur status ===
The story was becoming one of heartbreak for all those former players and stalwarts who had made Orrell one of the top clubs in the country before the professional era. A difficult, and at times heated process, off the field ensued, with the local newspaper reporting a group of members' intention to set up a breakaway club, before agreement from the existing committee that amateur rugby was the only way forward for rugby in Orrell, and a new start would allow the name and heritage of Orrell Rugby Union Football Club to move forward based on the values that were established by predecessors of this great club.

The season saw record losses for the club, the worst being a misery-compounding 18-try 124–0 defeat away to Blaydon, after finding just seventeen players able to travel to the fixture. Without a win and just two draws to their name, Orrell bode a sad farewell to Edge Hall Road on 21 April when they were defeated 24–17 by Morley despite a heroic and spirited performance from the Orrell youngsters. Chudleigh subsequently left the club at the end of another relegation season to join the coaching staff at Halifax RUFC, a job he combined with the role of Community Marketing Manager for Sale Sharks. In 2008, he was appointed the new First XV coach at West Park St Helens RFC.

Orrell played the 2007–08 and 2008–09 seasons in the Euromanx South Lancs and Cheshire 2. Despite suffering a 10-point deduction in the 08/09 season (subsequently demoting the club to 11th of 12 teams) for repeatedly postponing games due to poor playing surfaces at St John Rigby, it is believed the club will remain at this level once the RFU restructuring is finalised.

For the club's inaugural season in SLC2, six players from the professional era stayed with the team - Brian Roberts, Martin McKeown, David Price, Andy Daley, Andrew Statter and John Hyland.

In the 2010–11 season, the club was promoted from South Lancs and Cheshire 2.

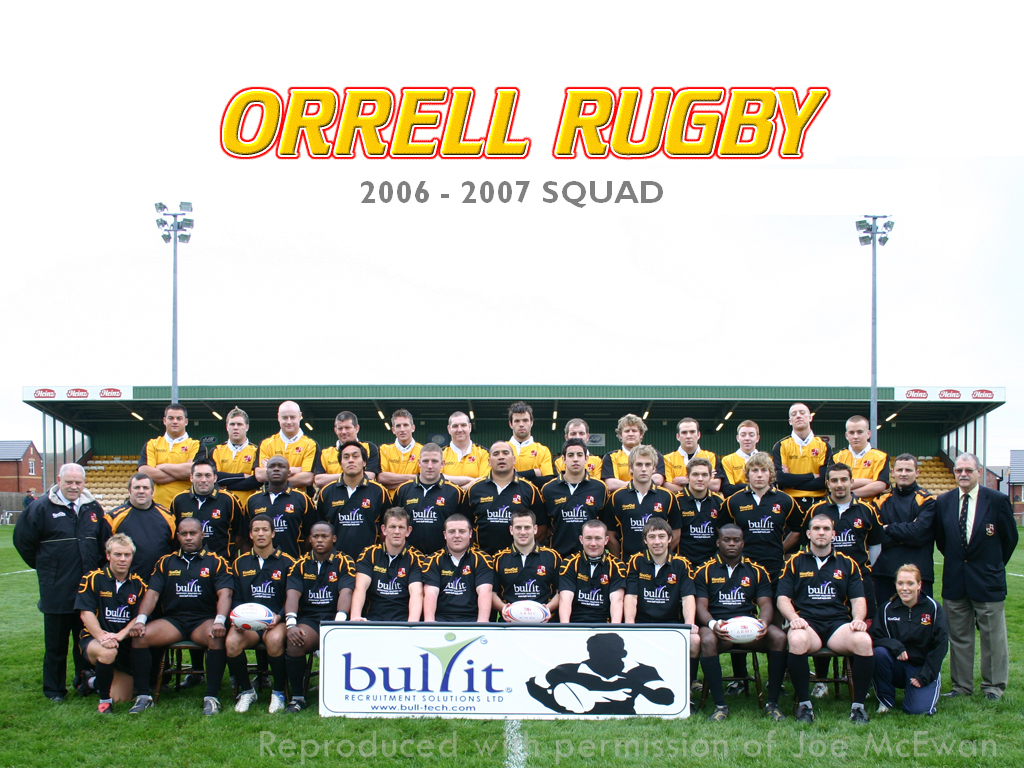
Orrell's last professional team

== Honours ==
First team:

- Glengarth Sevens main event winners (8): 1971, 1972, 1974, 1975, 1976, 1980, 1981, 1985
- Lancashire Cup winners (10): 1972, 1973, 1975, 1978, 1981, 1982, 1983, 1988, 1989, 1997
- Gala Sevens winners: 1975
- Glengarth Sevens Davenport Plate winners: 1979
- Merit Table B champions: 1985–86
- National 2 champions: 2001–02
- Powergen Shield winners: 2003
- Lancs/Cheshire 2 champions: 2010–11
- Lancs/Cheshire 1 champions: 2019–20

Orrell Anvils (third team):

- South Lancs/Cheshire 4 champions (2): 1999–00, 2000–01

== Ground ==
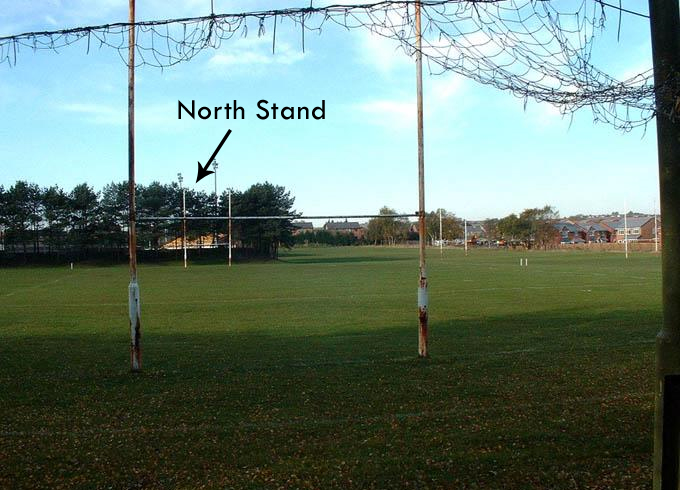
The 3 fields surrounding the main pitch prior to housing redevelopment

Orrell played their home games at Edge Hall Road from 1950 until 2007. Sub-landlord Dave Whelan, who was granted ownership of the lease on the land in 2001 after paying members £1,000 each for their shares, subsequently bought the freehold of the site on the death of the owner and sold the three pitches that had hosted the 2nd, 3rd and 4th XV's as well as all Junior sides for over £3 million.

As Edge Hall Road was brown-belt land, Whelan was required to provide the same facilities of the three fields at an alternate venue before a deal to build housing on the land could be finalized. Eventually, he contributed £400,000 to the construction of the all-weather pitch at St John Rigby college.

In 2008, current owners Wigan Warriors tied up a sponsorship deal with the Co-operative. As such, Edge Hall Road has been renamed the Co-operative Community stadium.

== Club colours ==
Orrell traditionally played in black and amber hooped shirts until they formed their first major technical partnership in 1993 with Nuttalls, seeing them switch to an all-black home kit with yellow, red and white hoops on the arms. The away for that season was a reverse with amber the dominant colour. They employed a white version of this kit for their European tours and a red away version for the 1994–95 season.

They reverted to black and amber hoop designs with Cica (1995–97) and Halbro (1997–00) before switching to Patrick in the summer of 2000. Their 2001–2005 jerseys were sponsored by JJB and featured amber lines on the sides and sleeves. For the 2006–07 season, the club's kit was produced by Kooga and sponsored by Bullit Recruitment Solutions. For the 2008–09 season, the club reverted to its original badge and used a low-budget amber and black hooped jersey.

== League performance ==
Season	Pld	W	D	L	F	A	+/-	Pts	Pos	Notes
2008–09 South Lancs & Cheshire 2	22	9	0	13	313	313	0	8	11th	-10 points for postponing 5 games
2007–08 South Lancs & Cheshire 2	22	13	2	7	372	313	59	26	4th	-2 points for postponing a game
2006–07 National League 3 North	26	0	2	24	293	1219	-926	4	14th	Relegated

== Notable former players ==
=== Lions Tourists ===
The following Orrell players have been selected for the Lions tours while at the club:

John Carleton (1980 & 1983)

Dewi Morris (1993)

=== Rugby World Cup ===
The following are players which have represented their countries at the Rugby World Cup whilst playing for Orrell:

Tournament	Players selected	England players	Other national team players
1987	2	Peter Williams, Fran Clough	
1991	1	Nigel Heslop	
1995	1	Dewi Morris	
1999	1		Steven So'oialo (Samoa)
2003	2		Andy Craig (Scotland) , Steven So'oialo (Samoa)

=== Other notable former players ===
- Austin Healey, England & British Lions
- Nick Easter, England
- Wes Davies, Rugby League international with Wales
- Simon Haughton, England Rugby league International & Super League Grand Final Winner
- Neil McCarthy, England
- Brian Ashton, England head coach
- Alfie To'oala, Samoa
- Dan Luger, England & British Lions
- Bob Kimmins, England
