= Wes Davies =

Wales international rugby league & union footballer

Personal information
- Full name: Wesley Davies
- Born: 20 January 1978 (age 48) Wigan, England
- Height: 6 ft 2 in (1.88 m)
- Weight: 15 st 4 lb (97 kg)

Playing information

Rugby league
- Position: Wing
Club
| Years | Team | Pld | T | G | FG | P |
|---|---|---|---|---|---|---|
| 1998–01 | Wigan Warriors | 47 | 12 | 0 | 0 | 48 |
| 2003 | Salford City Reds | 10 | 3 | 0 | 0 | 12 |
| | Total | 57 | 15 | 0 | 0 | 60 |
Representative
| Years | Team | Pld | T | G | FG | P |
| 1999–00 | Wales | 7 | 2 | 0 | 0 | 8 |

Rugby union
- Position: Wing
Club
| Years | Team | Pld | T | G | FG | P |
|---|---|---|---|---|---|---|
| 2001–02 | Orrell R.U.F.C. | 0 | 0 | 0 | 0 | 0 |
| 2003–04 | Worcester Warriors | 0 | 0 | 0 | 0 | 0 |
| 2004–06 | Cornish Pirates | 0 | 0 | 0 | 0 | 0 |
| 2006–09 | Doncaster Knights | 0 | 0 | 0 | 0 | 0 |
| 2009 | Cornish Pirates | 49 | 0 | 0 | 0 | 90 |
| | Total | 49 | 0 | 0 | 0 | 90 |
- Source: As of 6 May 2021

Wes Davies (born 20 January 1978) is an English former professional rugby league and rugby union footballer, playing international level rugby league for Wales. At club level, he played rugby league for the Wigan Warriors and Salford City Reds, and rugby union for Orrell R.U.F.C., Worcester Warriors, Doncaster Knights and the Cornish Pirates in the RFU Championship.

== Background ==
Wes Davies was born in Wigan, Greater Manchester, England, he is the grandson of the rugby union and rugby league footballer; Billy Boston.

== Playing career ==
=== Club career ===
Davies started his career as a rugby league player with Wigan Warriors. In October 2001, he switched codes to rugby union, joining Orrell. He had a brief second spell in rugby league with Salford City Reds in 2003 before returning to rugby union with Worcester Warriors.

=== International honours ===
Davies played international rugby league for the Wales national rugby league team, and played at the 2000 Rugby League World Cup.
