= List of new ecclesiastical buildings by J. L. Pearson =

John Loughborough Pearson (1817–97) was an English architect whose works were mainly ecclesiastical. He was born in Brussels, United Kingdom of the Belgium, and spent his childhood in Durham. Pearson started his architectural training under Ignatius Bonomi in Durham, becoming his principal assistant. In 1841 he left Bonomi, worked for George Pickering for a short time, then moved to London, where he lived for the rest of his life. He worked for five months with Anthony Salvin, then became principal assistant to Philip Hardwick, initially assisting him in the design of buildings at Lincoln's Inn. Pearson's first individual design was for a small, simple church at Ellerker in the East Riding of Yorkshire. This led to other commissions in that part of the country, which allowed him to leave Hardwick and establish his own independent practice.

Pearson designed many new churches during his career, ranging from small country churches to major churches in cities. Among the latter, St Augustine's Church in Kilburn, London, "may claim to be his masterpiece". Towards the end of his career he designed two new cathedrals, at Truro in Cornwall, and Brisbane in Australia; the latter was not built until after his death, and the building was supervised by his son, Frank. Pearson also carried out work in existing churches, making additions and alterations, or undertaking restorations. Again, these works were to churches of all sizes, from country churches to cathedrals; among the latter he worked on the cathedrals at Lincoln, Peterborough, Bristol, Rochester, Leicester, and Gloucester. Pearson also designed secular buildings, which ranged from schools, vicarages, and small houses, to large country houses, for example, Quarwood in Stow-on-the-Wold, Gloucestershire, and Fairstead in Great Warley, Essex. He designed Two Temple Place in Westminster, London, as an estate office for William Waldorf Astor. Pearson also designed university buildings for Sidney Sussex College and Emmanuel College in Cambridge.

Most of Pearson's buildings are in England, (he worked on at least 210 ecclesiastical buildings in England alone) but he also carried out work elsewhere, for example Treberfydd, a country house in Wales, and Holy Trinity Church in Ayr, Scotland. Further afield, in addition to Brisbane Cathedral in Australia, he designed a cemetery chapel in Malta. His plans were almost always in Gothic Revival style, but in some buildings he used other styles, for example Tudor Revival at Two Temple Place, and Jacobean at Lechlade Manor in Gloucestershire. In the cemetery chapel in Malta, he combined Romanesque Revival and Gothic Revival features.

Pearson was awarded the Gold Medal of the Royal Institute of British Architects in 1880. He had one son, Frank Loughborough Pearson, who worked with him as an assistant, completed some of his works after his father's death, and then continued in his own independent practice. Pearson died at his London home and was buried in Westminster Abbey. His estate amounted to over £53,000 (equivalent to £5,960,000 in 2025). This list contains Pearson's major designs for new ecclesiastical works, and includes all those in the National Heritage List for England.

== Key ==
Grade (England)	Criteria
Grade I	Buildings of exceptional interest, sometimes considered to be internationally important.
Grade II*	Particularly important buildings of more than special interest.
Grade II	Buildings of national importance and special interest.
Category (Scotland)	Criteria
Category A	Buildings of national or international importance, either architectural or historic, or fine little-altered examples of some particular period, style or building type.
"—" denotes a work that is not graded.

== Works ==
Name	Location	Photograph	Date	Notes	Grade
St Anne	Ellerker, East Riding of Yorkshire; 53.7528°N 0.6036°W		1843–44	A simple church with nave, chancel and west bellcote.	II
Wauldby Chapel	Welton, East Riding of Yorkshire; 53.7550°N 0.5319°W		1844	A chapel behind Wauldby Manor Farm in Gothic Revival style.	II
All Saints	North Ferriby, East Riding of Yorkshire; 53.7191°N 0.5028°W		1845–48	A limestone church with a west tower surmounted by a broach spire.	II
St Mary	Ellerton, East Riding of Yorkshire; 53.8502°N 0.9351°W		1846–48	A stone church consisting of a nave with a south porch, a chancel with a north vestry, and a west bellcote.	II
St James	Weybridge, Surrey; 51.3716°N 0.4610°W		1848	Added an additional south aisle in 1864.	II*
St Matthew	Landscove, Devon; 50.4845°N 3.7288°W		1849–50	A stone church in Decorated style. It has a tower at the east end of the south aisle with a broach spire.	II*
Holy Trinity	Bessborough Gardens, Westminster, Greater London; 51.4887°N 0.1306°W	—	1849–52	This was a Commissioners' church that suffered bomb damage in the Second World War and was demolished in 1953.	—
St Gastyn	Llangasty Tal-y-llyn, Llangors, Powys, Wales; 51.9269°N 3.2621°W		1850	Rebuilt an earlier church on the site. This is in Early English style with a west tower.	II*
St Mary	Broomfleet, East Riding of Yorkshire; 53.7340°N 0.6651°W		1857–61	A limestone church with a north tower.	II
St Peter's, Vauxhall	Lambeth, Greater London; 51.4867°N 0.1187°W		1863–64	Constructed in polychrome brick with stone dressings and slate roofs, the church has an apsidal chancel.	II*
Christ Church	Appleton-le-Moors, North Yorkshire; 54.2832°N 0.8729°W		1863–65	A limestone church with a southeast tower surmounted by a pyramidal spire.	I
St Joan and St Petroc	Devoran, Cornwall; 50.2118°N 5.0927°W		1865	Constructed in slatestone and granite, the church has a steeply pitched southwest steeple.	II
St Bartholomew	Eastoft, North Lincolnshire; 53.6398°N 0.7822°W		1855	A sandstone church consisting of a nave with aisles and a south porch, a chancel with a north vestry, and a tall triple bellcote at the junction of the nave and chancel. The gateway and churchyard walls, built at the same time and designed by Pearson, are listed separately, also at Grade II.	II
St Mary	Catherston Leweston, Dorset; 50.7457°N 2.8949°W		1857–58	A small church in knapped chert and stone, consisting of a nave, chancel and north vestry, with a bellcote on the west gable.	II*
St Leonard	Scorborough, East Riding of Yorkshire; 53.8942°N 0.4558°W		1857–59	Built for Lord Hotham.	I
St Mary	South Dalton, East Riding of Yorkshire; 53.8972°N 0.5295°W		1858–61	Built for the 3rd Lord Hotham.	I
St Peter	Daylesford, Gloucestershire; 51.9310°N 1.6480°W		1860	Rebuilding of an earlier church on the site, re-using some of its fabric. It has a cruciform plan with a central tower. At the same time Pearson designed the lychgate, which is listed separately at Grade II.	I
All Saints	Oakhill, Somerset; 51.2236°N 2.5227°W		1860–63	A limestone church with Bath stone dressings; it has a bellcote on the west gable.	II
St John the Evangelist	Rhydymwyn, Flintshire, Wales; 53.1934°N 3.1920°W		1860–63	Built in polychromic stone with a west bellcote.	II*
St James	Titsey, Surrey; 51.2765°N 0.0189°E		1861	A stone church with a southeast tower surmounted by a shingled spire.	II*
St John the Evangelist	Sutton Veny, Wiltshire; 51.1746°N 2.1406°W		1866–68	A new church to replace the ruined St Leonard's Church nearby. It is a large cruciform church with a steeple at the crossing.	I
St Helen	Hemsworth, West Yorkshire; 53.6141°N 1.3532°W		1867	Virtual rebuilding of an earlier church on the site, incorporating medieval fabric. It is constructed in sandstone, and has a west tower.	II
St Mary	Freeland, Oxfordshire; 51.8116°N 1.4009°W		1869	A limestone church with an apsidal chancel and a north tower. The lychgate of 1873, also designed by Pearson, is listed separately at Grade II.	II*
All Saints	Mudeford, Dorset; 50.7289°N 1.7445°W		1869	A small church in red brick with stone dressings; it has an east bellcote. The church was badly damaged by fire on 14 July 2022.	II
St Augustine	Kilburn, Greater London; 51.5332°N 0.1916°W		1870–77	A red brick church with stone dressings. It has a northwest steeple with pinnacles.	I
Christ Church	Crowton, Cheshire; 53.2664°N 2.6312°W		1871	A sandstone church with a red tiled roof and a double bellcote on the west gable.	II
All Saints	Speke, Liverpool, Merseyside; 53.3441°N 2.8579°W		1872–75	A simple stone church with a southwest steeple and a broach spire.	II
Holy Trinity	Wentworth, South Yorkshire; 53.4786°N 1.4232°W		1872–76	A new church replacing a ruined church nearby. It has a cruciform plan with a central steeple.	II*
St Mary	Chute Forest, Wiltshire; 51.2669°N 1.5586°W		1875	A church in flint with brick dressings and tiled roofs. On the south side is a tower with a tall pyramidal spire. The church is redundant and under the care of the Churches Conservation Trust.	II*
All Saints	Haywood, Moss, South Yorkshire; 53.6079°N 1.1177°W		1875	A limestone church with red tiled roofs and a west steeple. Now redundant.	II
St Theodore	Port Talbot, West Glamorgan, Wales; 51.5873°N 3.7732°W		1895–97	The church replaced an earlier chapel of ease. It is constructed in sandstone with Bath stone dressings and has a Sanctus bellcote; the planned tower was never built.	II*
Kirk Braddan	Braddan, Isle of Man; 54.1618°N 4.5075°W		1871-73	A new church to replace an older church on a site nearby. Built in brick, faced outside with local stone, it has an apsidal chancel and a south tower. Originally this had a wooden spire but it blew down in 1884 and again in 1886.	—
St Nicholas	Porton, Wiltshire; 51.1274°N 1.7295°W		1876–77	A flint church with brick dressings and tiled roofs. On the west gable is a bellcote.	II
St Nicholas	Upper Chute, Wiltshire; 51.2845°N 1.5724°W		1876–79	A new church in flint with brick dressings and slate roofs. It has a southwest tower with a broach spire.	II
St Margaret	Horsforth, Leeds, West Yorkshire; 53.8401°N 1.6426°W		1877–83	The spire was completed in 1902 by J. B. Frazer.	II
St John	Norley, Cheshire; 53.2496°N 2.6579°W		1878–79	A sandstone church with a north transept and a central tower.	II*
St Mary	Dartington, Devon; 50.4512°N 3.7123°W		1878–80	A new church, re-using fabric from an earlier medieval church, with a west tower.	II*
St John the Evangelist	Upper Norwood, London; 51.4115°N 0.0802°W		1878–87	A red brick church with stone dressings in Early English style. At the west end is a pair of square turrets with pyramidal roofs. The church was damaged by bombing in the Second World War and subsequently restored.	II*
St Hugh	Sturton by Stow, Lincolnshire; 53.3136°N 0.6652°W		1879	A brick church with an apsidal chancel, and a bellcote at the east end of the nave. Its lych gate and churchyard walls are listed separately, also at Grade II.	II
St Alban the Martyr	Highgate, Birmingham; 52.4659°N 1.8885°W		1879–81	A red brick church with a cruciform plan, an apsidal chancel, and a southwest tower.	II*
Chapel, St Antony's College	Oxford; 51.7629°N 1.2628°W		c. 1880	A two-storey stone building with lancet windows.	II
St George	Newbold Pacey, Warwickshire; 52.2117°N 1.5639°W		1880–82	Rebuilding of a church destroyed by fire.	II*
St Michael and All Angels	Croydon; Greater London; 51.3784°N 0.1009°W		1880–85	A red brick church with stone dressings. It has an apsidal chancel, a pair of turrets with spires towards the east end, and another short spire over the crossing.	I
Truro Cathedral	Truro, Cornwall; 50.2641°N 5.0512°W		1880–1910	Building continued through the rest of Pearson's life, and was completed thereafter by his son F. L. Pearson.	I
St Stephen	Bournemouth, Dorset; 50.7231°N 1.8807°W		1881–97	The nave was built in 1881–83, followed by the chancel in 1896–97, and the northwest tower was added in 1907 by Frank Pearson. It is a large stone church, with transepts, a Lady chapel, a flèche over the crossing and small twin towers at the east end.	I
St Barnabas	Hove, East Sussex; 50.8346°N 0.1774°W		1882–83	A cruciform church with an apsidal chancel and a flèche.	II*
St George	Cullercoats, North Tyneside; 55.0308°N 1.4315°W		1882–84	Built for the 6th Duke of Northumberland. A sandstone church with transepts, and a tower on the south transept.	I
St Agnes	Liverpool, Merseyside; 53.3895°N 2.9398°W		1883–85	A red brick church with stone dressings. The nave has two pairs of transepts, the chancel has an apse with an ambulatory and is flanked by turrets, and over the east crossing is a lead-covered flèche.	I
St Bartholomew	Thurstaston, Merseyside; 53.3485°N 3.1321°W		1883–86	A sandstone church with tiled roofs in early Decorated style.	II*
All Saints	Torquay, Devon; 50.4687°N 3.5410°W		1883–89	A church constructed in limestone with Bath stone dressings; in Decorated style.	II
St Matthew	Silverhill, Hastings, East Sussex; 50.8656°N 0.5556°E		1884	A new church, replacing one built in 1860.	II*
St Michael	Headingley, Leeds, West Yorkshire; 53.8192°N 1.5760°W		1884–85	A Gothic Revival church with a tall west steeple.	II*
St Peter	Hersham, Surrey; 51.3642°N 0.4020°W		1887	A cruciform church; the tower with its broach spire is at the northwest corner.	II
Chapel, St Mary's Convent	Wantage, Oxfordshire; 51.5917°N 1.4339°W	—	1887	A chapel for Anglican nuns of the Community of St Mary the Virgin.	II
St Hilda	Darlington, County Durham; 54.5249°N 1.5494°W		1887–88	Constructed in red brick with sandstone dressings, it is in Early English style. The church was declared redundant in 1986, converted into a community centre and offices in 1993, but vandalised and later became the Light and Life Gypsy Church.	II
All Saints	Hove, East Sussex; 50.8303°N 0.1671°W		1889–91	A church constructed in sandstone. The east end was completed in 1901, and the base of the tower and the narthex in 1924.	I
Fitzrovia Chapel	Westminster, Greater London; 51.5190°N 0.1383°W		1891	Italian Gothic interior, richly decorated, with a more austere Germanic gothic exterior. Completed after his death by his son Frank. This used to be than chapel of the Middlesex Hospital until its demolition in 2006. The chapel has been completely restored and its exterior is fully visible for the first time in history.	II*
St John the Evangelist	Whetstone, Barnet, Greater London; 51.6131°N 0.1545°W		c. 1891	A church with transepts, and with flying buttresses to the nave.	II*
Catholic Apostolic Church	Maida Avenue, Westminster, Greater London; 51.5230°N 0.1787°W		1891–93	A church and caretaker's house in brick and stone dressings with tiled roofs. It has a cruciform plan, and a detached tower at the southwest angle.	I
St Paul	Walsall, West Midlands; 52.5853°N 1.9817°W		1892–93	A sandstone church with tiled roofs.	II
St Paul	Daybrook, Gedling borough, Nottinghamshire; 53.0006°N 1.1377°W		1892–96	The church was paid for by Sir Charles Seely, and has a southwest tower.	II*
Chapel, Ta' Braxia Cemetery	Gwardamanġa, Pietà, Malta; 35.8901°N 14.4977°E		1893	A circular chapel with a central dome, incorporating Romanesque and Gothic features.	—
St Tydfil	Merthyr Tydfil, Wales; 51.7429°N 3.3780°W		1895–1901	A complete rebuilding of an earlier church on the site of the martyrdom of St Tydfil in the 5th century. It is in Neo-Romanesque style with an apsidal chancel and a tall west tower. The church closed for worship in 1968 and is used as a chapel of ease.	II
St Mary	Freefolk, Hampshire; 51.2369°N 1.3035°W		1896	A church in flint with Bath stone dressings. It has a steeple on the south side containing a chapel.	II
All Souls	South Ascot, Berkshire; 51.4035°N 0.6748°W		1896–97	A brick church with limestone dressings. It has a cruciform plan with a tower at the crossing.	II*
St Luke	Winnington, Cheshire; 53.2639°N 2.5305°W		1896–97	A brick church in the style of the 13th century. The entry in the Buildings of England series states "This must be one of the most disappointing churches Pearson ever designed".	—
St Mark	Barnet Vale, Barnet, Greater London; 51.6531°N 0.1849°W		1897–98	Designed the nave, north and south aisles, and the south porch in Perpendicular style. Additions were made later by a different architect.	II
Holy Trinity	Ayr, Scotland; 55.4614°N 4.6328°W		1897–1900	A new Episcopalian church to replace an earlier church on the site. It is constructed in cream stone and has narrow lancet windows.	A
Chapel; St Peter's Convent	Woking, Surrey; 51.3202°N 0.5377°W	—	1898–1900	Designed with his son F. L. Pearson, and completed after his death. It is a building of eight bays with an apsidal east end.	II*
Brisbane Cathedral	Brisbane, Australia; 27.4639°S 153.0301°E		1906–2009	Designed in 1888, building did not start until after Pearson's death, and it was supervised by his son F. L. Pearson. It is in Gothic Revival style and contains the only stone-vaulted roof in Australia.	—

== See also ==
- List of ecclesiastical restorations and alterations by J. L. Pearson
- List of non-ecclesiastical works by J. L. Pearson
