= List of ecclesiastical restorations and alterations by J. L. Pearson =

John Loughborough Pearson (1817–97) was an English architect whose works were mainly ecclesiastical. He was born in Brussels, Belgium, and spent his childhood in Durham. Pearson started his architectural training under Ignatius Bonomi in Durham, becoming his principal assistant. In 1841 he left Bonomi, worked for George Pickering for a short time, then moved to London, where he lived for the rest of his life. He worked for five months with Anthony Salvin, then became principal assistant to Philip Hardwick, initially assisting him in the design of buildings at Lincoln's Inn. Pearson's first individual design was for a small, simple church at Ellerker in the East Riding of Yorkshire. This led to other commissions in that part of the country, which allowed him to leave Hardwick and establish his own independent practice.

Pearson designed many new churches during his career, ranging from small country churches to major churches in cities. Among the latter, St Augustine's Church in Kilburn, London, "may claim to be his masterpiece". Towards the end of his career he designed two new cathedrals, at Truro in Cornwall, and Brisbane in Australia; the latter was not built until after his death, and the building was supervised by his son, Frank. Pearson also carried out work in existing churches, making additions and alterations, or undertaking restorations. Again, these works were to churches of all sizes, from country churches to cathedrals; among the latter he worked on the cathedrals at Lincoln, Peterborough, Bristol, Rochester, Leicester, and Gloucester. Pearson also designed secular buildings, which ranged from schools, vicarages, and small houses, to large country houses, for example, Quarwood in Stow-on-the-Wold, Gloucestershire. He designed Two Temple Place in Westminster, London, as an estate office for William Waldorf Astor. Pearson also designed university buildings for Sidney Sussex College and Emmanuel College in Cambridge.

Most of Pearson's buildings are in England (where he worked on at least 210 ecclesiastical buildings), but he also carried out work elsewhere, for example Treberfydd, a country house in Wales, and Holy Trinity Church in Ayr, Scotland. Further afield, in addition to Brisbane Cathedral, he designed a cemetery chapel in Malta. His plans were almost always in Gothic Revival style, but in some buildings he used other styles, for example Tudor Revival at Two Temple Place, and Jacobean at Lechlade Manor in Gloucestershire. In the cemetery chapel in Malta, he combined Romanesque Revival and Gothic Revival features. Pearson was awarded the Gold Medal of the Royal Institute of British Architects in 1880. He had one son, Frank Loughborough Pearson, who worked with him as an assistant, completed some of his works after his father's death, and then continued in his own independent practice. Pearson died at his London home and was buried in Westminster Abbey. His estate amounted to over £53,000 (equivalent to £7,600,000 in 2023). This list contains Pearson's major works on existing ecclesiastical works, including all those in the National Heritage List for England.

== Key ==
Grade	Criteria
Grade I	Buildings of exceptional interest, sometimes considered to be internationally important.
Grade II*	Particularly important buildings of more than special interest.
Grade II	Buildings of national importance and special interest.

== Works ==
Name	Location	Photograph	Date	Notes	Grade
St Mary	Elloughton, East Riding of Yorkshire; 53.7420°N 0.5697°W		1844–46	Rebuilding the body of the church, attached to the 15th-century tower, reusing some of the older material.	II*
All Saints	South Cave. East Riding of Yorkshire; 53.7674°N 0.6116°W		1847	Added the chancel.	II*
St Lawrence	Sigglesthorne, East Riding of Yorkshire; 53.8943°N 0.2449°W		1848	Restoration of a church dating from the 13th century.	II*
St Helen	Lea, Lincolnshire; 53.3704°N 0.7528°W		1849	Restoration of a church originating in the 13th century.	I
St Mary	Stow, Lincolnshire; 53.3276°N 0.6773°W		1850–52	Restored the chancel; then the remainder of the church in 1864–67.	I
St Peter and St Paul	Exton, Rutland; 52.6906°N 0.6395°W		1851–53	Restoration of a medieval church.	I
St Cyr	Stinchcombe, Gloucestershire; 51.6879°N 2.3924°W		1855	A virtual rebuilding of a church that originated in the 15th century.	II*
St Michael	Garton; 53.7999°N 0.0725°W		1856–57	With G. E. Street carried out restoration and internal decoration for Sir Tatton Sykes, 4th Baronet.	I
St Mary	Kirkburn, East Riding of Yorkshire; 53.9824°N 0.5076°W		1856–57	Rebuilt the chancel, added the north vestry and restored the porch of a church originating from the 12th century for Sir Tatton Sykes, 4th Baronet.	I
St Peter	Charlton, Wiltshire; 51.3035°N 1.8333°W		1857–58	Restoration of a church originating in the 16th century.	II*
St Edith	Bishop Wilton, East Riding of Yorkshire; 53.9868°N 0.7842°W		1858–59	Restoration of a church originating in the 12th century for Sir Tatton Sykes, 4th Baronet.	I
St Martin	North Nibley, Gloucestershire; 51.6630°N 2.3837°W		1859	Added a chancel to a church dating from the 15th century. In 1873 Pearson also carried out a restoration of the church.	II*
St Michael	Braintree, Essex; 51.8770°N 0.5497°E		1859–60	Restoration of the tower and spire, and rebuilding of the north aisle, of a church that was built in the 12th-13th century, and extended in the 15th-16th century.	II*
St Mary	Riccall, North Yorkshire; 53.8331°N 1.0601°W		1864–65	Restoration of a church originating in the 12th century, which included the rebuilding of the west tower and the south aisle wall, and adding a porch.	I
All Saints	Bishop Burton, East Riding of Yorkshire; 53.8444°N 0.4960°W		1865	Rebuilding of the chancel and south vestry of a church originating in the 13th century.	II*
St Peter	Over Wallop, Hampshire; 51.1427°N 1.5951°W		1866	Rebuilding of the tower and chancel.	II*
All Saints	Idmiston, Wiltshire; 51.1351°N 1.7196°W		1866–67	Restoration of a church dating from the 12th century, built in flint and limestone. It is now redundant and is under the care of the Churches Conservation Trust.	I
All Saints	Settrington, North Yorkshire; 54.1214°N 0.7172°W		1867–68	Chancel largely rebuilt in a church dating from the 12th–13th century.	II*
St John the Baptist	Royston, South Yorkshire; 53.5965°N 1.4512°W		1867–69	Restoration of a church dating mainly from the 15th century.	I
Holy Cross	Burley, Rutland; 52.6824°N 0.6952°W		1869–70	Restoration and alterations to a Norman church. The alterations included rebuilding the east end, replacing all but one of the windows, and adding a new porch. The church has since been declared redundant, and is under the care of the Churches Conservation Trust.	II*
St Mary the Virgin	Bletchingley, Surrey; 51.2414°N 0.0994°W		1870	Restoration of a church originating in the 11th century.	I
Lincoln Cathedral	Lincoln; 53.2343°N 0.5363°W		1870–93	Restoration of a cathedral originating in the 11th century.	I
Holy Trinity	Gainsborough, Lincolnshire; 53.3949°N 0.7716°W		1871	Extension to the chancel of a church built in 1841–43. The church was declared redundant in 1973, and has since been converted into an arts centre.	II
St James	Ludgershall, Wiltshire; 51.2565°N 1.6243°W		1873	Restoration of a church dating from the 12th century, built in flint and limestone. During the restoration the west tower was heightened.	I
St Edward	Stow-on-the-Wold, Gloucestershire; 51.9300°N 1.7237°W		1873	Restoration of a church dating from the Saxon era.	I
St Nicholas	Emmington, Oxfordshire; 51.7152°N 0.9270°W		c. 1874	Partly rebuilt the nave and the chancel, with Charles Buckeridge, retaining the 14th-century tower.	II*
All Saints	Bracebridge, Lincoln; 53.1994°N 0.5521°W		1875	Addition of a north aisle, north transept and vestry, and possibly the south porch, to a church that originated in the 11th century.	I
St Peter	Milton Lilbourne, Wiltshire; 51.3428°N 1.7287°W		1875	Restoration of a flint and limestone church dating from the 13th century.	II*
All Saints	Hooton Pagnell, South Yorkshire; 53.5659°N 1.2685°W		1876	Restoration of a church dating from the 12th century.	I
All Saints	Steetley, Whitwell, Derbyshire; 53.3027°N 1.1858°W		1876–80	Restoration of a church dating from the 12th century.	I
St Mary	Pirton, Hertfordshire; 51.9716°N 0.3318°W		1876–83	The church originated in the 12th century. In 1876–77 Pearson rebuilt the tower, and in 1882–83 he restored the nave.	I
St Mary	Hornby, North Yorkshire; 54.3389°N 1.6594°W		1877	Work carried out for the Duchess of Leeds on a church dating from about 1080.	I
St Helen	Skipwith, North Yorkshire; 53.8387°N 1.0027°W		1877	Restoration of a church dating from the Saxon era.	I
St Mary	Lastingham, North Yorkshire; 54.3045°N 0.8826°W		1879	Added a clerestory and vault to a church built in 1078 for a Benedictine monastery.	I
Holy Trinity	Shenington, Oxfordshire; 52.0822°N 1.4574°W		1879	Restoration of a church dating from the 12th century.	II*
St Katherine	East Woodlands, Selwood, Somerset; 51.1962°N 2.3022°W		1880	Built the body of the church, attached to a tower dating from about 1712.	II*
St Mary	Iwerne Minster, Dorset; 50.9295°N 2.1887°W		1880	Alterations to a church dating from the 12th century.	I
St John the Baptist	Pinner, Harrow, Greater London; 51.5946°N 0.3790°W		1880	Restoration of a church dating mainly from the 14th century; this included the addition of dormer windows in a new roof.	II*
St Mary	Atherington, Devon; 50.9902°N 4.0087°W		1880s	Restoration of a church dating from the 15th century.	I
St Leonard	Hythe, Kent; 51.0728°N 1.0841°E		1880s	Alterations to a church dating from about 1100.	I
St Mary the Virgin	Fen Ditton, Cambridgeshire; 52.2216°N 0.1691°E		1881	Restoration of a church dating from about 1300, with further work in 1888–89. This included rebuilding the west tower in 13th-century style.	II*
St Peter	Parkstone, Poole, Dorset; 50.7246°N 1.9531°W		1881	The church was commenced in 1876 to a design by Frederick Rogers. Pearson made alterations, including adding vestries and an organ chamber, followed by the nave in 1891–92. It was completed by his son, Frank.	II*
St John the Baptist	Peterborough, Cambridgeshire; 52.5727°N 0.2438°W		1881–83	Restoration of a church dating from 1402, in which the galleries were removed, the clerestory and the roofs were rebuilt, and window tracery was replaced.	I
Church of the Resurrection	Eastleigh, Hampshire; 50.9713°N 1.3513°W		1882	Added a north aisle to a church built in 1868–69 by G. E. Street. It was further extended between 1899 and 1905 by Arthur Blomfield, but was damaged by fire in 1985, and later converted into flats.	II
St Peter	Manningford Bruce, Wiltshire; 51.3212°N 1.8011°W		1882	Restoration of a Norman church, which included re-roofing the church and rebuilding the porch.	I
St Nicholas	Mowsley, Leicestershire; 52.4958°N 1.0484°W		1882	Restoration of a church dating from the 13th century. The church consists of a nave, chancel, transepts, and a west bellcote.	II*
St Nicholas	Chiswick, Hounslow, Greater London; 51.4860°N 0.2505°W		1882–84	Rebuilt the body of the church, attached to a 15th-century west tower.	II*
St Matthias	Torquay, Devon; 50.4677°N 3.5064°W		1882–85	Lengthening of the chancel and other alterations, followed in 1894 by the addition of another bay to the west, and a porch.	II*
Peterborough Cathedral	Peterborough, Cambridgeshire; 52.5725°N 0.2393°W		1882–86	Extensive restoration.	I
All Saints	Kingston upon Thames, Greater London; 51.4104°N 0.3061°W		1883	Restoration of a church dating from the 14th century.	I
St Lawrence	Towcester, Northamptonshire; 52.1323°N 0.9874°W		1883	Restoration of a church dating from the 13th century.	I
St Edith	Stow, Lincolnshire; 53.3370°N 0.6377°W		1883–84	Restoration of a church dating from the 12th century.	I
All Saints	Frindsbury, Kent; 51.4004°N 0.5059°E		1884	Restoration during which the north aisle was added (or rebuilt), the window tracery was renewed, and the northeast vestry was added.	II*
St Martin	Saundby, Nottinghamshire; 53.3828°N 0.8206°W		1885–86	Restoration of the chancel of a church dating from the 13th century.	I
St Mary	Weston, Lincolnshire; 52.8085°N 0.0839°W		1885–86	Restoration of a church dating from 1170.	I
All Saints	Maidstone, Kent; 51.2707°N 0.5215°E		1886	Replaced timber roofs of church that originated in 1395.	I
St Giles	Wigginton, Oxfordshire; 51.9966°N 1.4323°W		1886	Restoration of the nave and north aisle of a church dating from the 13th century.	I
St. Peter and St. Paul	Shrewsbury, Shropshire; 52.7076°N 2.7438°W		1886–87	Restoration of an abbey church originating in the 11th century.	I
St Giles	Haughton, Staffordshire; 52.7818°N 2.2005°W		1887	Restoration of a church containing 13th-century fabric.	II*
St Pancras	Exeter, Devon; 50.7238°N 3.5326°W		1887–89	The chancel arch was rebuilt as part of a restoration.	II*
Bristol Cathedral	Bristol; 51.4517°N 2.6008°W		1888	Completed the western front with its twin towers.	I
Rochester Cathedral	Rochester, Kent; 51.3890°N 0.5032°E		1888	Restoration particularly of the west front.	I
St Swithun	Cheswardine, Shropshire; 52.8659°N 2.4184°W		1888–89	Replacement of an earlier church, other than the 13th-century north chapel and the 15th-century west tower.	II*
St John	St John's, Redhill, Surrey; 51.2294°N 0.1764°W		1888–91	Rebuilt the nave and chancel of a church built in 1842–43; added the steeple in 1895.	II*
St Mark	Bristol; 51.4529°N 2.6003°W		1889	Rebuilding of the north transept and the west front of a church originally built in 1230.	I
St Nicholas	Great Yarmouth, Norfolk; 52.6114°N 1.7273°E		1889	Restoration.	II*
St Mary	Ellesmere, Shropshire; 52.9075°N 2.8895°W		1889	Rebuilt the east wall of the chancel and reconstructed the east window.	I
St Mary	East Farleigh, Kent; 51.2526°N 0.4836°E		1891	Restoration of a church originating in the 11th or 12th century.	II*
St Mary	Shipley, West Sussex; 50.9843°N 0.3703°W		1893	Restoration of a church dating from the 12th century.	I
St Dunstan	Cranford, Hounslow, Greater London; 51.4918°N 0.4146°W		1895	Restoration of a church dating from probably the 13th century.	II*
St Andrew	Boothby Pagnell, Lincolnshire; 52.8662°N 0.5578°W		1896	Restoration of a church dating from the early 12th century. At about the same time Pearson designed the lychgate, which is listed separately at Grade II.	I
Leicester Cathedral	Leicester; 52.6347°N 1.1371°W		1896	Restored the south aisle.	II*
Gloucester Cathedral	Gloucester; 51.8672°N 2.2458°W		1896–97	Pearson was the consultant architect for the restoration of the Lady Chapel.	I
St Margaret	Westminster, Greater London; 51.4999°N 0.1270°W		Undated	Added the west porch.	I

== See also ==
- List of new ecclesiastical buildings by J. L. Pearson
- List of non-ecclesiastical works by J. L. Pearson
