= William Nesfield =

William Nesfield may refer to:

- William Andrews Nesfield, English soldier, landscape architect and artist
- William Eden Nesfield, his son, English architect
