= List of non-ecclesiastical works by J. L. Pearson =

John Loughborough Pearson (1817–97) was an English architect whose works were mainly ecclesiastical. He was born in Brussels, Belgium, and spent his childhood in Durham. Pearson started his architectural training under Ignatius Bonomi in Durham, becoming his principal assistant. In 1841 he left Bonomi, worked for George Pickering for a short time, then moved to London, where he lived for the rest of his life. He worked for five months with Anthony Salvin, then became principal assistant to Philip Hardwick, initially assisting him in the design of buildings at Lincoln's Inn. Pearson's first individual design was for a small, simple church at Ellerker in the East Riding of Yorkshire. This led to other commissions in that part of the country, which allowed him to leave Hardwick and establish his own independent practice.

Pearson designed many new churches during his career, ranging from small country churches to major churches in cities. Among the latter, St Augustine's Church in Kilburn, London, "may claim to be his masterpiece". Towards the end of his career he designed two new cathedrals, at Truro in Cornwall, and Brisbane in Australia; the latter was not built until after his death, and the building was supervised by his son, Frank. Pearson also carried out work in existing churches, making additions and alterations, or undertaking restorations. Again, these works were to churches of all sizes, from country churches to cathedrals; among the latter he worked on the cathedrals at Lincoln, Peterborough, Bristol, Rochester, Leicester, and Gloucester. Pearson also designed secular buildings, which ranged from schools, vicarages, and small houses, to large country houses, for example, Quarwood in Stow-on-the-Wold, Gloucestershire. He designed Two Temple Place in Westminster, London, as an estate office for William Waldorf Astor. Pearson also designed university buildings for Sidney Sussex College and Emmanuel College in Cambridge.

Most of Pearson's buildings are in England, but he also carried out work elsewhere, for example Treberfydd, a country house in Wales, and Holy Trinity Church in Ayr, Scotland. Further afield, in addition to Brisbane Cathedral, he designed a cemetery chapel in Malta. His plans were almost always in Gothic Revival style, but in some buildings he used other styles, for example Tudor Revival at Two Temple Place, and Jacobean at Lechlade Manor in Gloucestershire. In the cemetery chapel in Malta, he combined Romanesque Revival and Gothic Revival features. Pearson was awarded the Gold Medal of the Royal Institute of British Architects in 1880. He had one son, Frank Loughborough Pearson, who worked with him as an assistant, completed some of his works after his father's death, and then continued in his own independent practice. Pearson died at his London home and was buried in Westminster Abbey. His estate amounted to over £53,000 (equivalent to £7,600,000 in 2023). This list contains Pearson's major designs for non-ecclesiastical works, and includes all those in the National Heritage List for England.

== Key ==
Grade	Criteria
Grade I	Buildings of exceptional interest, sometimes considered to be internationally important.
Grade II*	Particularly important buildings of more than special interest.
Grade II	Buildings of national importance and special interest.
"—" denotes a work that is not graded.

== Works ==
Name	Location	Photograph	Date	Notes	Grade
House	North Road, Durham; 54.7768°N 1.5819°W	—	1842	Built as a two-storey sandstone house, later used by a bus company as a canteen.	II
New Hall, Lincoln's Inn	Holborn, Camden, Greater London; 51.5163°N 0.1145°W		1843–45	As assistant to Philip Hardwick, banqueting hall and offices in Tudor style.	II*
Library, Lincoln's Inn	Holborn, Camden, Greater London; 51.5167°N 0.1147°W		1843–45	As assistant to Philip Hardwick, library in Tudor style.	II*
School	Devoran, Cornwall; 50.2112°N 5.0926°W		1846	Built as a National School, with one large and one small room, later extended.	II
School	Feock, Cornwall; 50.2055°N 5.0506°W	—	1846	Built as a National School, later used as a house.	II
Treberfydd	Llangors, Powys, Wales; 51.9213°N 3.2675°W		1847–50	A new country house for Robert Raikes replacing an earlier house on the site. It is an asymmetrical house in Tudor Revival style which incorporates the core of the earlier house. At its entrance is a three-storey battlemented tower with gargoyles.	I
School and schoolmaster's house	Llangasty Tal-y-llyn, Llangors, Powys, Wales; 51.9265°N 3.2623°W	—	c. 1850	The original building was a single-storey schoolroom. Pearson added the schoolmaster's house in the 1890s. It has since been extended and converted for domestic use.	II*
Quar Wood (or Quarwood)	Stow-on-the-Wold, Gloucestershire; 51.9204°N 1.7278°W		1856–59	A country house in French Gothic style, which has since been extensively altered.	—
Broomfleet Grange	Broomfleet, East Riding of Yorkshire; 53.7342°N 0.6646°W	—	c. 1860	Built as a parsonage, later a private house.	II
Brooking Lodge	Dartington, Devon; 50.4332°N 3.7490°W	—	1860–61	A school and school house in limestone, later converted into a single house.	II
St Peter's School	Lambeth, Greater London; 51.4871°N 0.1186°W		1860–61	Built as a brick school in picturesque Gothic style. No longer used as a school.	II*
St Peter's Orphanage	Lambeth, Greater London; 51.4866°N 0.1190°W	—	1860–62	Built as an orphanage and a training college for the daughters of clergy and professionals. Constructed in brick with dressings of Bath stone in three storeys. Later known as Herbert House.	II*
Parsonage	Appleton-le-Moors, North Yorkshire; 54.2835°N 0.8732°W	—	1865	Later converted into two dwellings.	II
School and schoolmaster's house	Appleton-le-Moors, North Yorkshire; 54.2798°N 0.8718°W	—	1865	A two-storey house and school hall in limestone with some timber framing. Later used as a house and village hall.	II
Rectory	Ayot St Peter, Hertfordshire; 51.8213°N 0.2333°W	—	1866–67	Built as a rectory, later a house.	II
Roundwyke House	Ebernoe, West Sussex; 51.0523°N 0.5898°W	—	1868	A house in Tudor style in two storeys. It is constructed in stone with timbered gables.	II
Parsonage	Freeland, Oxfordshire; 51.8117°N 1.4014°W	—	1869–71	Built as a parsonage, later part of the Convent of St Clare.	II
School	Freeland, Oxfordshire; 51.8117°N 1.4015°W	—	1871	A school in limestone with an upper storey in mock timber framing. Later used as a house.	II
Lechlade Manor	Lechlade, Gloucestershire; 51.6982°N 1.6866°W		1872–73	A large three-storey country house in stone with tiled roofs; in Jacobean style. Later became part of the Convent of St Clotilde.	II
Subdeanery	Lincoln; 53.2341°N 0.5380°W		1873	Refronting of a building that originated in the 13th century.	II*
School	Sutton Veny, Wiltshire; 51.1750°N 2.1414°W		1873–74	A primary school, constructed in limestone, with an L-plan.	II
Vicarage and vicarage lodge	Clifton, York; 53.9710°N 1.0972°W	—	1879–80	A vicarage for the church of St Philip and St James.	II
Rectory	East Woodlands, Selwood, Somerset; 51.1946°N 2.3019°W	—	1880	Remodelled a rectory built in the early 19th century, later used as a house.	II
Church Cottage	Dartington, Devon; 50.4514°N 3.7125°W	—	c. 1880	A two-storey house in limestone with sandstone dressings and slate roofs. It has an L-shaped plan.	II
Westwood House	Sydenham, Lewisham, Greater London; 51.4275°N 0.0604°W	—	1881	A house built for Henry Littleton. It later became an orphanage, but was demolished in 1952.	—
Canon's House	Westminster, Greater London; 51.4978°N 0.1267°W	—	1882	A two-storey house in red brick with stone dressings, later used as offices.	II
All Saints Vicarage	Hove, East Sussex; 50.8302°N 0.1663°W	—	1883	A two-storey brick building with an L-plan, later converted into two dwellings. Its garden wall and gatepiers are listed separately, also at Grade II.	II
Convent of St Peter	Woking, Surrey; 51.3200°N 0.5384°W	—	1883–89	Built as a convent in free Perpendicular style in red brick with stone dressings. Later used as a home for the elderly.	II
Turle's House, Little Dean's Yard	Westminster School, Greater London; 51.4987°N 0.1277°W	—	1884	A school house, incorporating 11th-century fabric. It is constructed in brick with stone dressings, and is in Neo-Tudor style.	II
Rectory	Whitwell, Derbyshire; 53.2858°N 1.2134°W	—	1885	Built for the Revd George Mason, it is a sandstone building with tiled roofs, and was later used as a private house.	II
Stonebow and Guildhall	Lincoln; 53.2293°N 0.5405°W		1885–90	The south gateway to the city with the guildhall above, restored and remodelled.	I
Spurfield	Exminster, Devon; 50.6782°N 3.4961°W	—	1887–89	Built as a rectory, later a residential home for handicapped people.	II
Great Gatehouse	Bristol; 51.4516°N 2.6018°W		1888	Restoration and extension of an archway dating from the 12th century.	I
Palace of Westminster	Westminster, Greater London; 51.4997°N 0.1246°W		1888	Added offices against the side of Westminster Hall.	I
Fairstead	Great Warley, Essex; 51.5880°N 0.2918°E	—	1889	A country house in red brick with stone dressings and in an irregular plan.	II
Law School and University Offices	Cambridge; 52.2053°N 0.1162°E	—	1890	Rebuilding of part of the west wing.	I
Sidney Sussex College	Cambridge; 52.2075°N 0.1201°E	—	1890	Added a north cloister.	I
Cliveden	Taplow, Buckinghamshire; 51.5581°N 0.6883°W		1890s	Altered and redecorated the interior. Also, in 1893–96, Pearson designed the mosaics in the chapel.	I
Sidney Sussex College	Cambridge; 52.2078°N 0.1202°E	—	1891	Added the Cloister Court.	II*
Emmanuel House, Emmanuel College	Cambridge; 52.2046°N 0.1257°E		1893–94	A new building in Jacobean style.	II
Hostel, Emmanuel College	Cambridge; 52.2044°N 0.1261°E		1893–94	Extended a building of 1885.	II
Astor Estate Office	2 Temple Place, Westminster, Greater London; 51.5116°N 0.1122°W		1895	Built as an estate office for the Astor Estate, including a flat for Lord Astor. Later became the Incorporated Accountants Hall. The gates, gatepiers and railings, also designed by Pearson, are listed separately, also at Grade II*.	II*
Rustington House	Rustington, West Sussex; 50.8187°N 0.5147°W	—	Late 19th century	Built as a house, later used as Summerlea School. The lodge on Worthing Roadis listed separately, also at Grade II.	II
Model farm	Hever, Kent; 51.1971°N 0.1128°E	—	Undated	These were all parts of a model farm for Hever Castle; each is listed at Grade II. They consist of the former bailiff's house, the stables, the colonnade, the haybarn, the dairy, the dairy cottage, the Epsom Wing, the stud farm, and cartsheds. The Model Farm at Hever was the work of Frank Loughborough Pearson, son of J.L. Pearson, as is made clear in the references given.	II

== See also ==
- List of new ecclesiastical buildings by J. L. Pearson
- List of ecclesiastical restorations and alterations by J. L. Pearson
