= William Andrews Nesfield =

English soldier and artist (1793 - 1881)

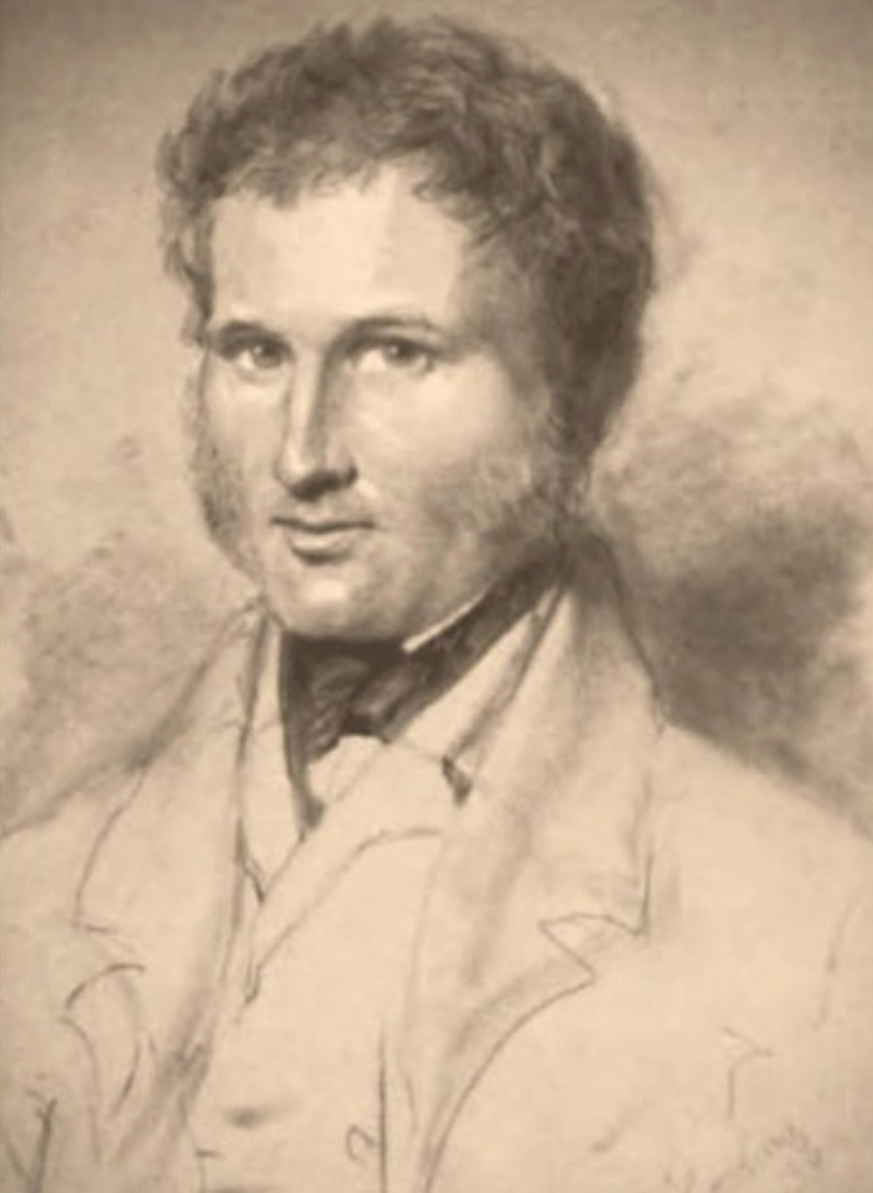
Willam Andrews Nesfield

William Andrews Nesfield (1793–1881) was an English soldier, landscape architect and artist. After a career in the military which saw him serve under the Duke of Wellington, he developed a second profession as a landscape architect, designing some of the foremost gardens of the mid-Victorian era. These included Witley Court in Worcestershire, Castle Howard in Yorkshire, Treberfydd in Powys and Kew Gardens. He also established a professional dynasty; with his sons Arthur Markham and William Eden Nesfield, he developed over 250 landscapes across the United Kingdom.

== Biography ==
Nesfield was born at Lumley Park, County Durham. In 1808, after the death of his mother, the family moved the few miles to Brancepeth where his father became rector of St Brandon's church. His stepmother was Marianne Mills of Willington Hall, whose nephew was the noted architect Anthony Salvin, and Nesfield's younger sister married Salvin.

Nesfield was educated at Durham School, then located on Palace Green, before entering the army. He fought under Wellington in Spain and at Waterloo, and he also served for two years in Canada, where he was present at the Siege of Fort Erie and the Battle of Chippawa. He retired in 1816, and took up a career as a painter of watercolours, particularly of waterfalls, earning the praise of John Ruskin in Modern Painters.

While still exhibiting at the Old Water Colour Society, Nesfield began work as a professional landscape architect, with the encouragement of Salvin.

From 1840 until his death in 1881 he was responsible, either singly or with his sons Arthur Markham and William Eden, for no fewer than 259 commissions in the British Isles. His military training enabled him to design the water features that were so effective in many of his gardens.

The Royal Institute of British Architects (RIBA) has some of his plans.

== Witley Court, Worcestershire ==
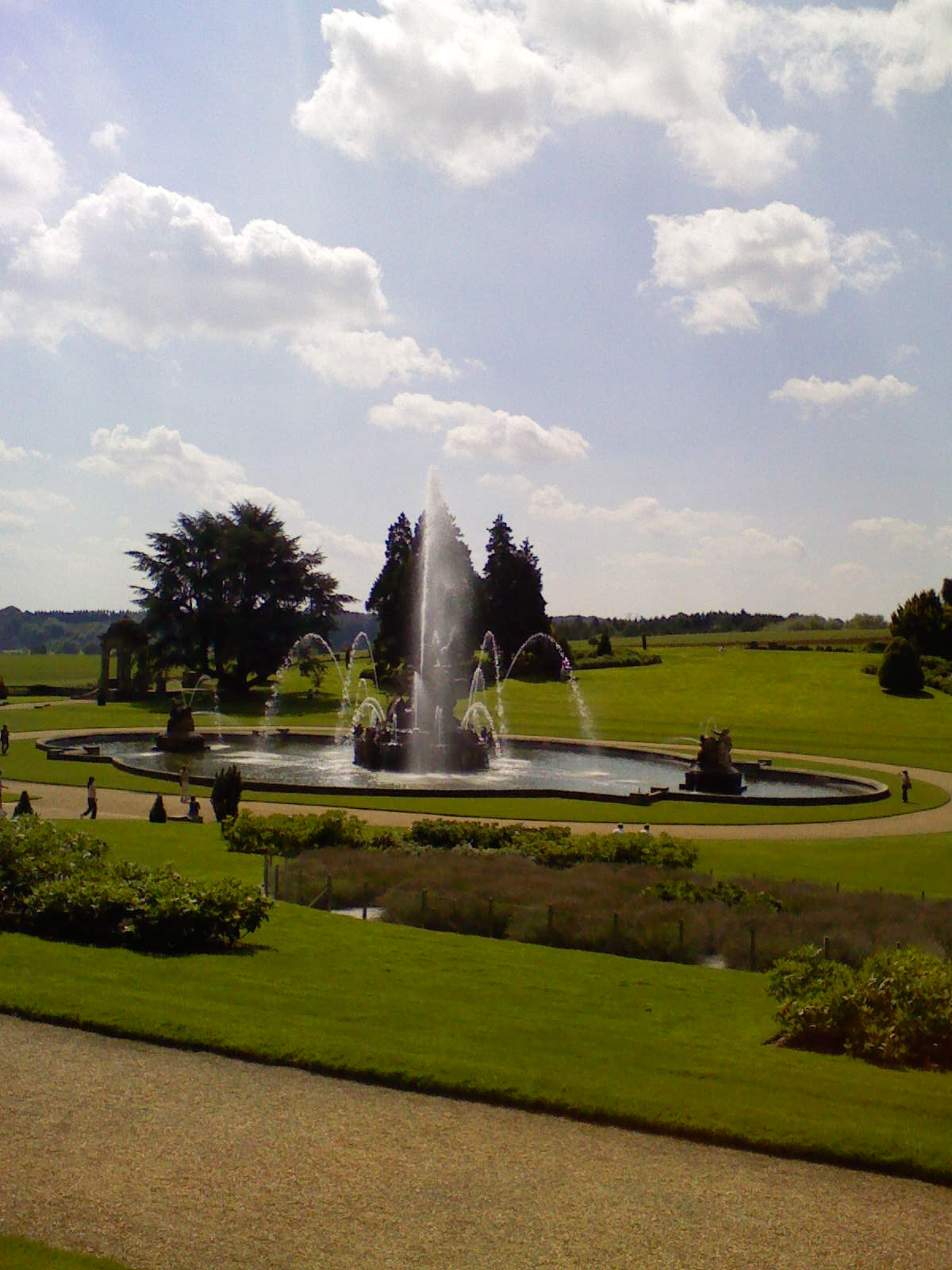
Witley Court fountain

The Witley Court fountain in Worcestershire, which cost the equivalent of more than £1 million in 1853, is the triumphant centrepiece of elegant gardens designed by Nesfield, who described them as his “monster work”. It has 120 separate jets hidden amongst giant shells, sea nymphs, dolphins and a monstrous serpent. The main jet reaches up to 90 feet (27 m). Performing artist Bing Crosby was keen to acquire the fountain for his Hollywood home, but the monumental, 20-ton, block sculpture with 54-metre-wide pool, which can be compared to the smaller Trevi Fountain in Rome and fountains at Versailles, remained in England. The gardens and fountain were designed to reflect the wealth of the 1st Earl of Dudley and the grandeur of his Italianate mansion, which was often visited by royalty and other rich landowners. Nesfield's dramatic south parterre was set against the wide spaces of the surrounding parkland and the distant wooded wild landscape.

== Castle Howard, North Yorkshire ==
Castle Howard's South Lake in North Yorkshire was refashioned by Nesfield at the same time as he installed the Prince of Wales Fountain in the 1850s. Ten years later between the South Lake and New River Bridge, the area was formalised with the construction of the Cascade, Temple Hole Basin and the Waterfall. These features remained but fell into disrepair after the 9th Countess changed Nesfield's planting which surrounded the South Lake.

== Oxon Hoath, Kent ==
Oxon Hoath in Kent was built more than 600 years ago by Sir John Culpeper, a knight of King Henry V, as a royal park for oxen and deer. Over the centuries the estate has been the family home to eleven knights, many of whom enhanced the house and grounds in a variety of classical architectural styles. In 1846 Sir William Geary commissioned the renowned French gothic revivalist architect Anthony Salvin to build the mansard dome, and the chateau tower. Sir William, son of Admiral Sir Francis Geary who was Nelson's mentor, also engaged W. A. Nesfield to create the formal gardens in the style of Capability Brown. The Oxon Hoath gardens are the only surviving unaltered parterre gardens in England today.

== Kew Gardens, London ==
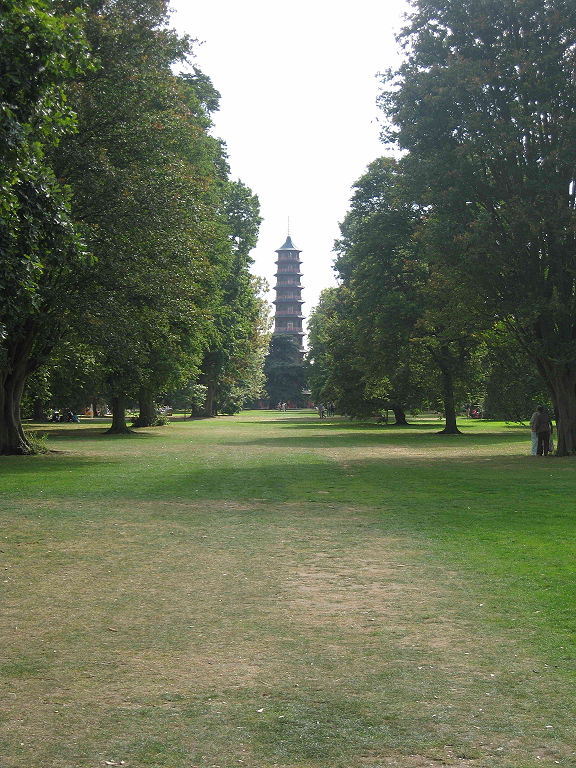
The Pagoda Vista in Kew Gardens

Three great vistas are Nesfield's signature on today's Kew Gardens, London. In a 'goose foot' pattern radiating from the Palm House, Pagoda Vista was a grassed walk some 850 m (2,800 ft) long; Syon Vista was a wide gravel-laid walk stretching 1,200 m (3,937 ft) towards the Thames; while the third, short, vista fanned from the northwest corner of the Palm House and focused on a single 18th-century cedar of Lebanon towards Kew Palace. Pagoda Vista is lined with paired broadleaved trees with, flanking them and to their exterior, paired plantings of evergreens. Nesfield's idea of being able to both see and walk to the Pagoda along the centre line of Kew Gardens was, in fact, a return to the turn-of-the-century landscape.

== Treberfydd, Brecon ==
Treberfydd house was built near Brecon by John Loughborough Pearson for the Raikes family in 1852. The Treberfydd grounds contain the only remaining example of a Nesfield garden still tended by descendants of the patron for whom he created it. While the detailed planting of the Nesfield parterre has been grassed over, Treberfydd contains one of the gardener's signature vistas, called The Long Walk. It can be found by standing at the gate of the kitchen gardens and looking back through a landscaped woodland to the manicured lawns of the estate.

== Kinmel Hall, Conwy ==
Kinmel Hall is the third house to be built on the site in Conwy county borough. Designed by W. A. Nesfield's son, William Eden Nesfield, it was completed in the 1870s, and W. A. Nesfield was responsible for the adjoining 18 acres (73,000 m^{2}) of walled gardens.

== Neuport House, Herefordshire ==
This was a modest work but typical of his style with a semi circular lawn, borders and neatly trimmed yew hedges including a tazza, identical to that he installed at his Regents Park project.

== The Nesfield Archive ==
The archive contains over 900 drawings and watercolours, over 700 plans and sketches, for example a beautiful sketch for the Perseus and Andromeda fountain at Whitley Court and other items, for example books annotated by Nesfield.

The archive was offered for sale to Sotheby's and through the help of Dr. Shirley Rose Evans was acquired by the Garden Museum in 2024 with the assistance of National Heritage Memorial Fund, the Art Fund, the Arts Council England/V&A Purchase Fund, and the Friends of the Nations’ Libraries.

== Sources ==
- C. Ridgway, 'William Andrews Nesfield, between Uvedal Price and Isambard Kingdom Brunel', in Journal of garden history; Vol. 13 (1993), pp 69–89.
- C. Ridgway, ed., 'William Andrews Nesfield, Victorian landscape architect', in Papers from the bicentenary conference, The King's Manor, York 1994. [York] 1996.
- Tooley, M[ichael] J.: William Andrews Nesfield 1794-1881. Bicentenary exhibition, Durham University Library, 6. Aug. - 23. Sep. 1994. Witton-le-Wear 1994.
- David Raikes, owner of Treberfydd, 2007.
