= Lechlade Manor =

Grade II listed house in Gloucestershire, United Kingdom

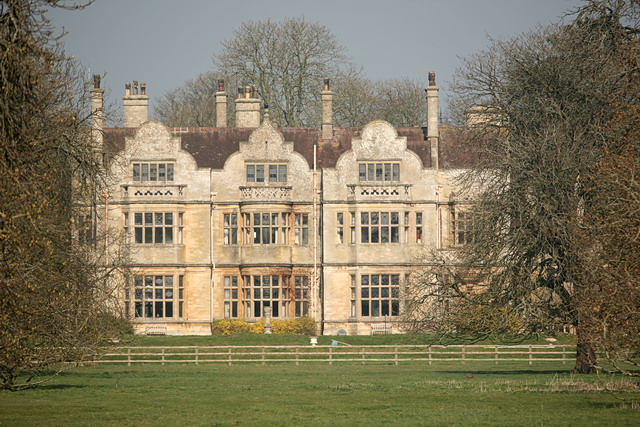
- The garden front with "one of Pearson's favourite two-storey bay windows"

- Location within Gloucestershire
- 51.6982°N 1.6867°W
- Type: House
- Location: Lechlade, Gloucestershire

History
- Built: 1872–1873

Site notes
- Architectural style: Jacobethan
- Owner: Privately owned

Listed Building – Grade II
- Official name: Convent of St Clotilde
- Designated: 4 July 1985
- Reference no.: 1303277

Listed Building – Grade II
- Official name: Manor Lodge, Lechlade
- Designated: 4 July 1985
- Reference no.: 1155614

Listed Building – Grade II
- Official name: Manor Farmhouse, Lechlade
- Designated: 4 July 1985
- Reference no.: 1089425

Lechlade Manor in Lechlade, Gloucestershire, England, is a Victorian country house built for George Milward, a lawyer, by John Loughborough Pearson. Primarily an ecclesiastical architect, working on over 200 church buildings in his fifty-year career, the manor represents one of Pearson's rare forays into secular building. Dating from 1872 to 1873, Lechlade was subsequently sold to the Sisters of St Clotilde and operated as a convent for much of the 20th century. In the 1990s, it was converted back to a private residence, with some enabling development in the grounds. Lechlade Manor is a Grade II listed building.

== History ==
At the Norman Conquest of England in 1066, the manor of Lechlade was held by Siward Barn, a grandson of Edward the Confessor. Later owners included Isabel, wife of Roger de Mortimer, and Richard of Cornwall, second son of King John. The manor passed out of possession of The Crown in the 16th century, and by the 18th was in the ownership of Sir Jacob Wheate. Encumbered by very considerable debts, Sir Jacob sold the manor and, after a further succession of sales, it was bought by George Milward in the early 19th century. His grandson, another George, began the construction of the present house in 1871.

John Loughborough Pearson (1817–1897) specialised in ecclesiastical architecture. In a career of over fifty years, he worked on some 200 church buildings, principally on restorations, although his Truro Cathedral was the first new Anglican cathedral to be built in England since the reconstruction of St Paul's. (Note: John Summerson wrote that Pearson "displayed a mastery of stone vaulting not seen since the Middle Ages". But his restorations have been criticised as heavy-handed; a centenary article in Apollo by Gavin Stamp was entitled "The criminal genius of J. L. Pearson".) The small amount of secular building he undertook was mainly in London, or in the West, including Treberfydd in Wales, and Quar Wood and Lechlade, both in Gloucestershire.

The Milwards owned the manor for just over 100 years, selling the estate to the Sisterhood of St Clotilde in 1939. The convent operated a girls' school at the manor until 1998 when it was sold, the remaining sisters returning to France. (Note: An archaeological survey undertaken during the redevelopment of the manor house records the discovery, in 1938, of an Acheulean hand axe in a disused gravel pit some 250m to the north of the manor. The axe is now in the collection of the British Museum.) The main house again became a private home, while the stables were converted, and a number of homes were built as enabling development in the grounds.

== Architecture and description ==
Lechlade Manor is of three storeys, and is constructed to a rough E-plan. The house is gabled, and contains one of Pearson's characteristic, double-height bow windows on the garden frontage. David Verey and Alan Brooks, in their Gloucestershire 1: The Cotswolds volume of the Buildings of England, record that the cost of the manor was some £6,000. They note the inspiration for the Cloister Court at Sidney Sussex College, Cambridge, a sequence of buildings Pearson constructed some twenty years later, almost at the end of his life. Mark Girouard, in his study The Victorian Country House, notes that Lechlade, "one of Pearson's few country houses", demonstrates his move away from strict adherence to a Gothic style, towards a more relaxed neo-Elizabethan or Jacobethan idiom.

Historic England's listing record states that the ground floor interiors retain much of Pearson's original work. The house is a Grade II listed building. Ancillary estate buildings also have Grade II listings, including the lodge and Manor Farmhouse.

== Sources ==
- Bradley, Simon; Nikolaus, Pevsner (2014) [1970]. Cambridgeshire. The Buildings of England. New Haven, US, and London: Yale University Press. ISBN 978-0-300-20596-1. OCLC 895381346.
- Girouard, Mark (1979). The Victorian Country House. New Haven, US and London: Yale University Press. ISBN 978-0-300-02390-9.
- Verey, David; Brooks, Alan (2000) [1970]. Gloucestershire 1: The Cotswolds. The Buildings of England. New Haven, US and London: Yale University Press. ISBN 978-0-140-71098-4. OCLC 633122306.
