= St Edward's Church, Stow-on-the-Wold =

Coordinates: 51.930°N 1.724°W

St Edward's Church or the Parish Church of Stow-on-the-Wold
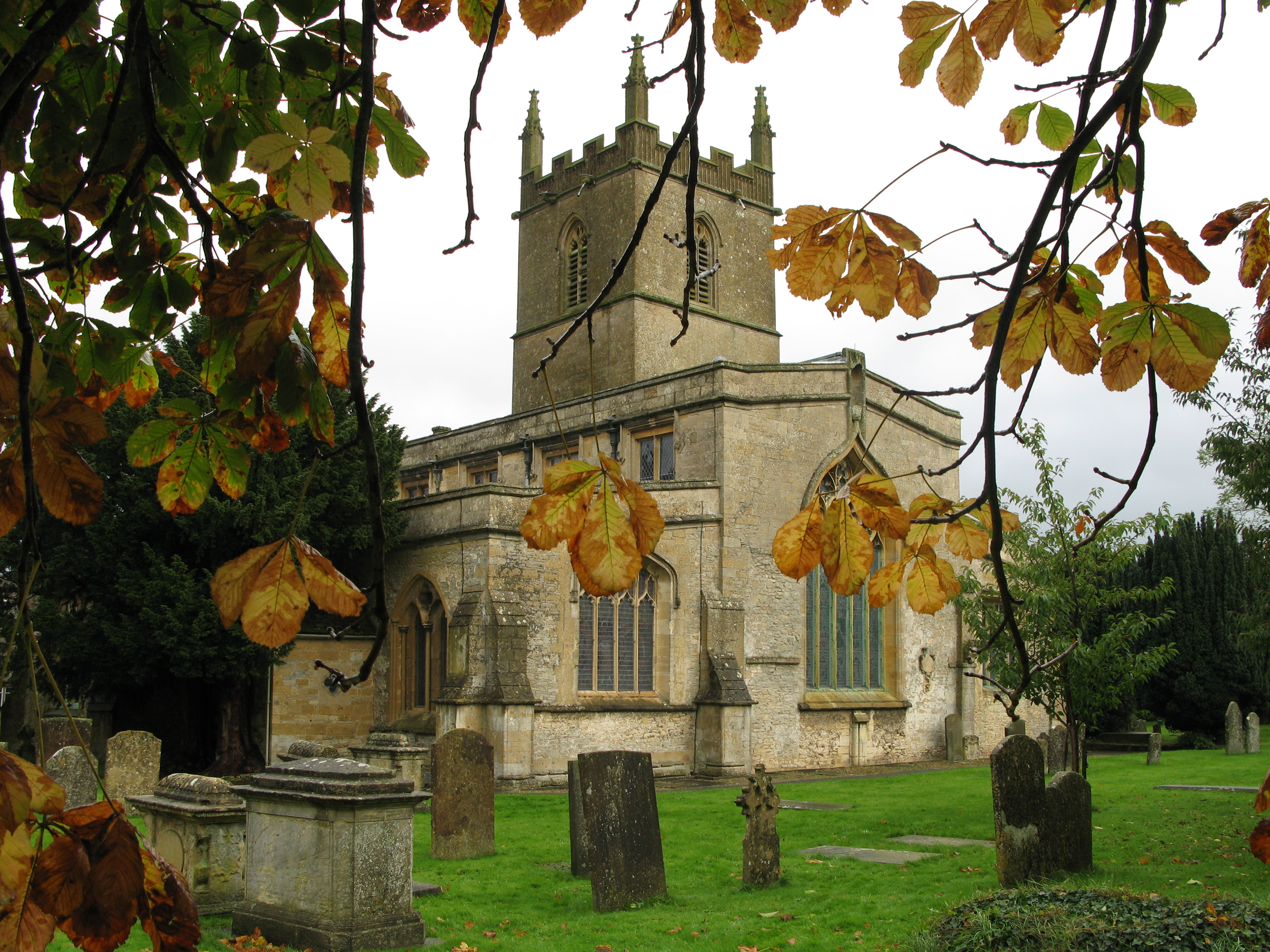
- St Edward's Church or the Parish Church of Stow-on-the-Wold
- Location: Church Street, Stow-on-the-Wold
- Country: England
- Denomination: Church of England
- Churchmanship: Broad church, humanitarian
- Website: scats.org.uk

History
- Status: Parish church
- Dedication: 'Saint Edward', uncertain as to whether Martyr, Confessor or 'St Edwold'
- Consecrated: before 1086

Architecture
- Functional status: Active
- Architect(s): Medieval (unknown) and John Loughborough Pearson (restorer)
- Style: Norman-Perpendicular

Administration
- Province: Canterbury
- Diocese: Gloucester
- Archdeaconry: Cheltenham
- Deanery: North Cotswold
- Parish: Stow-on-the-Wold

Clergy
- Rector: Reverend Martin Peter Short, Rector

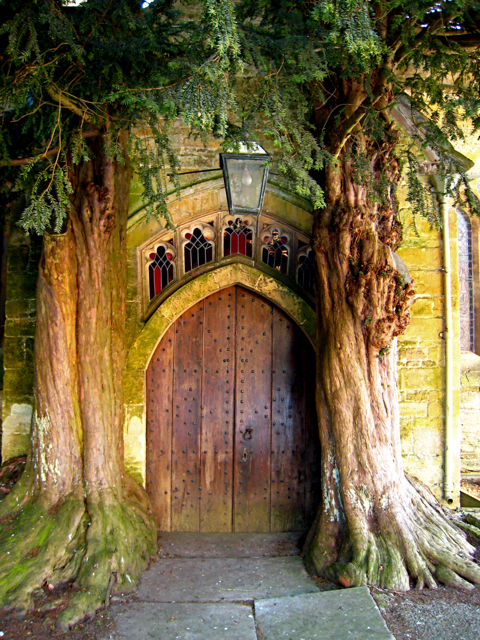
St Edward's Parish Church north door flanked by yew trees.

St Edward's Church is a medieval-built Church of England parish church, serving Stow-on-the-Wold ('Stow'), Gloucestershire.

A tourist attraction, it is among 98 Grade I listed buildings in Cotswold (district), a mainly rural district having about one third of the total of Grade I listed buildings in Gloucestershire. The surrounding district, due to many factors such as the Cotswold Hills and distance from major cities, has a concentration of conservation areas featuring neatly cut blocks and masonry of Cotswold stone which is borne out by the building materials of the church's square-towered, multi-arch structure. Its large stained glass windows, buttresses and neatly kept churchyard are among the reasons for its listing in the highest architectural category.

== Today ==
=== Description ===
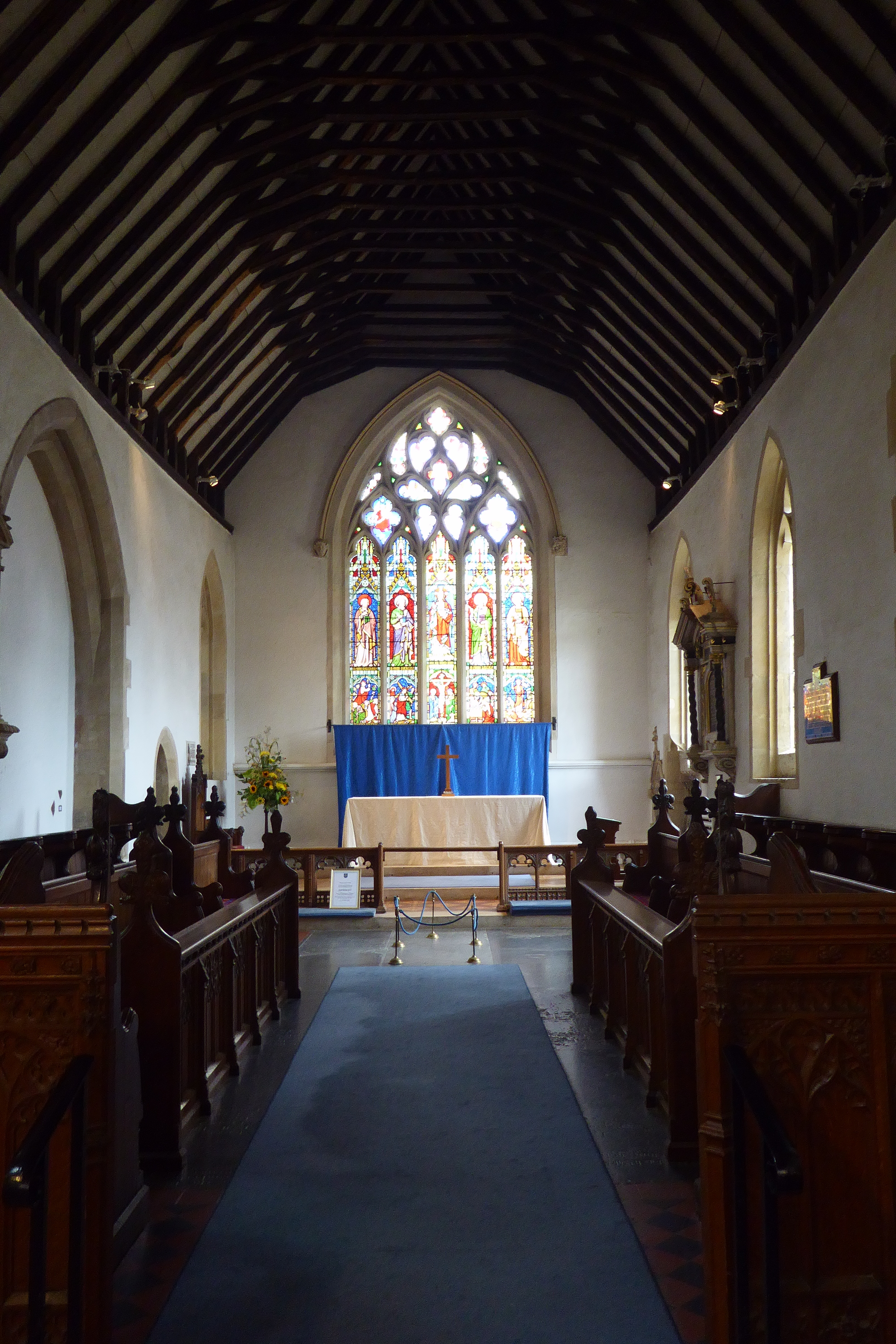
The interior of the church, showing the altar

The church features a mixture of architectural styles due to additions and renovations over several centuries. The floor plan is Cruciform, including a four-bay nave with north and south porches, wide aisles, a tower in the south transept position, a north transept and a three-bay chancel with organ chamber and vestry. The walls are rubble built, the roof is Cotswold stone, and the ashlar tower has parapets. The remaining Norman work is confined to the buttresses and some chip-carved string at the west end of the church.

The south porch is gabled, and the shallow north porch from the 17th century masks a 13th-century moulding on the north door, which is framed by yew trees. The north aisle features three late tracery windows and one small 13th century lancet, and the south aisle features 14th century tracery. The chancel includes tall 14th century windows which have been restored, and a flowing east window designed by Pearson.

The west window is from the 14th century and reticulated with an ogee arch which ends in a canopied niche. The north transept is probably 13th century and features two lancets flanking the 15th century east window. Tudor windows line the north transept and lie on the west side of the aisles. Square-headed clerestory windows feature a stilted drip moulding. In the interior of the church, the arcades date principally from the 13th century and incorporate older 12th century structure, but the work is not uniform. The north transept is divided from the north aisle by a double arcade. The chancel features a 14th-century truss-rafter roof, and a decorated piscina and part of a sedilia retaining traces of colour are fitted under the first south window, which is lowered to accommodate them. The chancel arch is of plain half-round structure with no springing. The organ is blocked, and a chamber arch and two medieval tile settings have been excavated at west end. The nave roof is 19th century, but one of the 15th century corbel beams bears the arms of John Weston, who served as rector from 1416 to 1438. The font is in goblet style from the late 16th century, and the stained glass was provided by Wailes and Strang, a 19th-century firm notable for English church window designs.

The church features a four-stage tower from the 15th century, with corner buttresses to the second stages, two-light supermullioned bell openings, battlements adorned with blank arches, and crocketed corner pinnacles. A projecting rectangular turret on the southwest side houses the stair. The parapet includes pinnacles and a string course with gargoyles. The tower was completed in 1447, is 88 feet (26.8 metres) high and houses the heaviest ring of bells, eight in all, in Gloucestershire. A clock with chimes has existed there since 1580, and the present clock was built in 1926. The painting of the Crucifixion in the south aisle was painted by Gaspar de Craeyer (1582–1669), a contemporary of Reubens and Van Dyck. Many notable features of the Cotswold church can be attributed to the town's prosperity as a trade centre.

The church is in the highest category of architectural/historic listing (Grade I), having been assessed under the standards set by the statutorily responsible charity, English Heritage, which compiles the heritage list for England. A tourist attraction, it is among 98 Grade I listed buildings in Cotswold (district), a mainly rural district having about one third of those in Gloucestershire, having many conservation areas and neatly cut Cotswold stone which is the main building material of this structure.

=== Ministry ===
The ministry of the benefice of Stow, Condicote and the Swells (the SCATS benefice) under the Reverend Karen Wellman is broad church and it encourages believers to be beyond parochial, fulfilling the Anglican Five-Mark Mission which requires the worldliness and mindfulness to

1. proclaim the Good News of the Kingdom [of God and his Heaven]
2. teach, baptise and nurture new believers
3. respond to human need by loving service
4. seek to transform unjust structures of society, to challenge violence of every kind and to pursue peace and reconciliation..
5. strive to safeguard the integrity of creation and sustain and renew the life of the earth.

== History ==
=== Building and restorations ===
The Church of St Edward is an ashlar Cotswold stone Norman church, its parts dating from the 11th or 12th to the 14th century except for its tower and clerestory of the 15th century. It stands on the site of the original Saxon church, believed to have been made of wood. The tower and clerestory required substantial funds, provided by the community's wool trade which directly enriched the medieval rectory. The church was also renovated in the 17th century and in 1873. The then parish priest, Reverend Robert William Hippisley, commissioned architect John Loughborough Pearson. Hippisley served long and had a substantial parish income as Rector during his 1844-99 ministry. He conserved the building avoiding blunt Victorian restoration. He attracted complaints in the running of the final civic (secular) vestry:

...all became controversial issues that on occasions led to physical violence. Factions grew up, and before he resigned in 1899 the townspeople had hanged the rector in effigy.

— The Victoria County History Project Title: The History of Gloucestershire, 1965, Christopher Elrington (1930-2009)

=== Rectory house ===
Stow Lodge, now non-religious was said in 1900 to be Hippisley's property, built, in the 18th century, for the Chamberlayne family whose crest it bears and was used as the parsonage for a large part of the 19th century. The original parsonage, which was under repair in 1840 has been lost; with a plausible reference north-east of the town centre 'Parson's Corner'. The rectory was built in the early 20th century, away from the town at the southern end of the graveyard.

=== Role in Battle of Stow-on-the-Wold ===
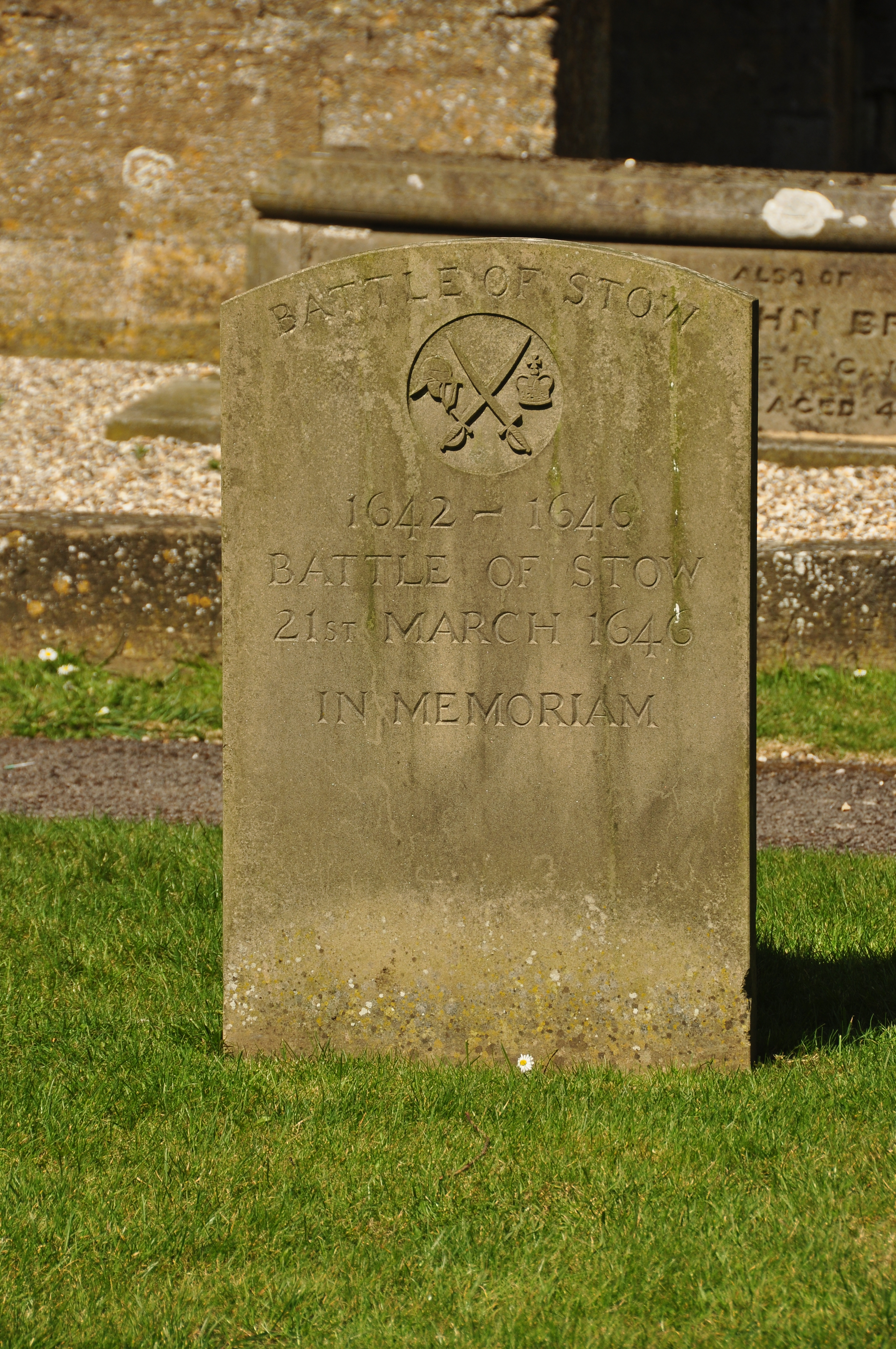
The Battle of Stow memorial at St Edward's Church

In 1646 during the English Civil War, the Royalist army marched through the Cotswolds, attempting to join the forces of King Charles I at Oxford. However, they were met by a Parliamentary force in the battle, and the encounter was so deadly that it was said ducks could bathe in the pools of blood left in the street near the market square. Reportedly the street was afterward called "Digbeth" or "Duck's Bath" because of this. After the last battle in the war was fought at nearby Donnington, Gloucestershire, the church housed 1,000 prisoners following the defeat of the Royalists. The church features memorials to Francis Keyt and John Chamberlayne who died in 1646 during the Battle of Stow, and also houses memorials to those who died in service during World War I and World War II.

=== In contemporary film, fiction or media ===
The funeral of the Who's bass player, John Entwistle, took place at the church in 2002. Entwistle lived at Quarwood, a country estate in the civil (and ecclesiastical) parishes of Stow. Many mourners attended the private church service conducted by family friend Rev. Colin Wilson. The service was broadcast through a PA system to fans who had gathered outside.

=== Wealth and contribution ===
==== Medieval period ====
Elrington, a prominent historian selected to compile the lengthy Victoria County History work found sources such as quoting the town's name as Edwardstow(e) from at least Domesday.

Churches were dedicated to the Holy Family or Saints, so if the town was named after its church as well as an individual, the likely root of the name he believed was Edward the Martyr. A Latin charter pre-dating the other main contender for the dedication, bearing the date 986, he added, seems to be a medieval fake. He draws attention to the other lightly evidenced roots: saint 'Edwold' Æthelwold of Winchester and the late 12th century-canonised immediately pre-1066 King, Edward the Confessor being the dedication, the latter being taken as true in local 15th century worship. Maugersbury or Donnington in the parish formed wealthy manors. The only glebe in Donnington in 1765, Chapel Yard, may record a failed intention to build a chapel of ease there.

Evesham Abbey's rights in this church's donations, tithes and lands were an issue in disputes between the abbey and the bishop and in 1208 it was proposed to resolve the difficulties by appropriating the church. By then the abbey possessed two-thirds of the great tithes of Donnington and perhaps also of Maugersbury. In 1291 the Abbey also received a pension of £1 5s. 0d. from the church. The Abbey's attempts to appropriate subsided and the living (benefice) stayed as a rectory.

==== Lands and contributions to the church ====
In the 16th century the rectory let as a farm produced nearly £18 a year clear. By 1650 it was worth c. £150 (a year) and remained about the same until inclosure (privatisation of common land) in 1765 and 1766 when in return for loss of its imputed interests the rectory (rector's successive estate) received glebe of 266 acres (1.08 km^{2}) of that land. The annual value of the benefice rose to over £500 a year in 1864, equivalent to £55,000 in 2025, since which it has in real terms waned due to economic changes and a loss of public functions' supervision, such as to Cotswold District council and central government.

Three chantries in the town, one including a hospital, one formerly known as a guild that was reputedly pre-Conquest ended on Henry VIII's Chantries Acts; various educational and civic improvements and products of funding from the church are shown in medieval National Archives and Lambeth Palace records.

==== Rectors, curates and church hall ====
Rowland Wylde, parish priest of Stow and Lower Swell from 1642, was deprived before 1649 as a delinquent and restored (as with the monarchy, the year before) in 1661, this post having been served meanwhile by "an active controversialist of Congregational (parish independence) tendencies". Benjamin Callow followed Wylde in Stow and Lower Swell, ministering them for 40 years. He spent most of his time in Stow and faced disciplinary action for neglecting Lower Swell. Four rectors spanned the whole period from 1744 to 1899, and three of them were members of the Hippisley family; all of them maintained (paid for) curates but towards the end of the service from 1844 to 1899 of Robert William Hippisley, with whom many wealthy inhabitants quarrelled, a Stow Curate was appointed and paid by a committee independent of him. That curate was J. T. Evans who was rector from 1899 to 1935 and author of the standard work on the church plate of Gloucestershire. In 1937 the first church hall was built by the Foss Way in the superseded parish of Lower Swell.

=== Local roles before the enlargement of state funded institutions ===
In 1566 Stow had four churchwardens in all to help cover Maugersbury and Donnington, as in 1826. By the early 19th century one of the wardens for the town was the rector's nominee (choice). The office of parish clerk and sexton, prized, was filled by election by the parishioners. Two overseers and two surveyors who presented separate accounts operated and were made responsible in 1825 for repairing the town well. In 1834 a small majority defeated a proposal to appoint a paid assistant overseer. Two conditional contributions in 1691 and 1710 towards building a workhouse were returned because no workhouse was built. In 1712 Quarter Sessions (county judicial/administrative matters) ordered that a combined workhouse and house of correction should be established at Stow in the 'Eagle and Child'. Expenditure on poor relief in the late 18th century increased more than the average for the area, and remained high. A school of industry with 22 children, recorded in one record of 1802 was not in that of 1812.

To deal with health problems, the vestry in the 18th century kept a pest house, (fn. 523) and in 1831 and 1833, following outbreaks of smallpox, temporary boards of health were set up. (fn. 524) A burial board was formed in 1855, and a new graveyard was opened south of the town beside the Foss Way. A nuisance removal committee existed in 1859 when a nuisance inspector was appointed.

The town and the two hamlets all became part of the Stow-on-the-Wold Poor Law Union under the Poor Law Amendment Act 1834, and of the Stow-on-the-Wold highway district in 1863. Under 1872 legislation the town and the urban part of Maugersbury (transferred to Stow civil parish in 1894) were placed under a local board and subsequently became an urban district. Donnington and the rest of Maugersbury became part of the Stow-on-the-Wold Rural Sanitary District under the Act of 1872, and were transferred in 1935 to the newly formed North Cotswold Rural District, in which the Stow urban district was merged the same year and from that year a civil parish council governed the remaining civil aspects beneath the district level of government.

Numerous church-overseen testamentary charities served, many of which were sufficient provision for the weak and infirm housed in the row of almshouses. Funds were more manageably administered into an annual revenue-focussed joint board Scheme from 1899. In 1961 the almshouses were condemned as unfit for habitation but five were occupied and stipends continued to be distributed to the almspeople. The other charities for the poor were distributed in kind, such as the rent from a fuel allotment (coppices) being spent on coal.

== See also ==
- Grade I listed buildings in Gloucestershire
- List of ecclesiastical restorations and alterations by J. L. Pearson
