= John Loughborough Pearson =

British architect

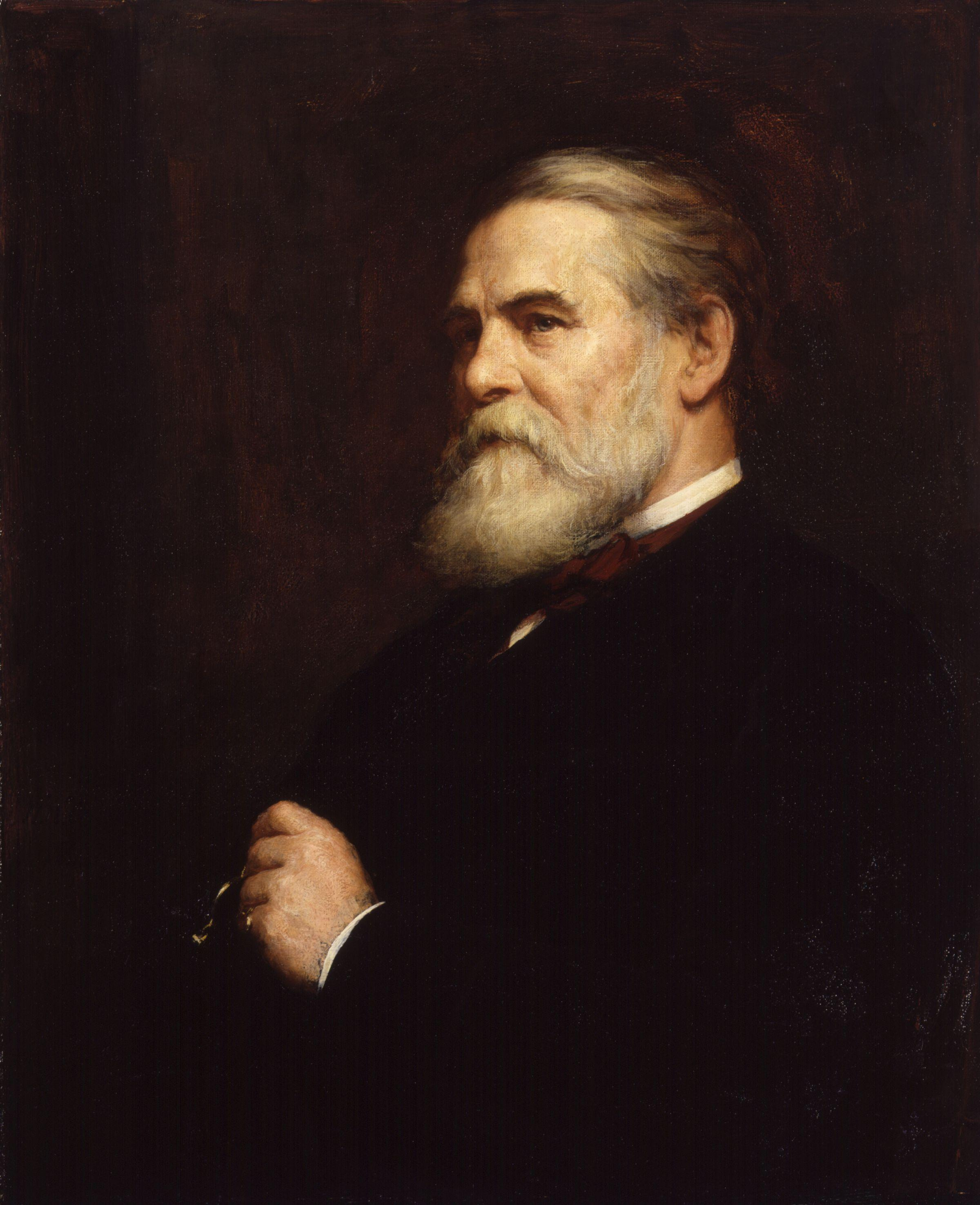
- Portrait by Walter William Ouless, at the National Portrait Gallery (London).
- Born: 5 July 1817; Brussels, United Kingdom of the Netherlands
- Died: 11 December 1897 (aged 80)
- Occupation: Architect
- Awards: Royal Gold Medal (1880)
- Buildings: Truro Cathedral; St John's Cathedral, Brisbane
- Projects: St Margaret's, Westminster; Bristol Cathedral

John Loughborough Pearson RA (5 July 1817 – 11 December 1897) was a British Gothic Revival architect renowned for his work on churches and cathedrals. Pearson revived and practised largely the art of vaulting, and acquired in it a proficiency unrivalled in his generation. He worked on at least 210 ecclesiastical buildings in England alone in a career spanning 54 years.

== Early life and education ==
Pearson was born in Brussels on 5 July 1817. He was the son of William Pearson, etcher, of Durham, and was brought up there. At the age of fourteen, he was articled to Ignatius Bonomi, architect, of Durham, whose clergy clientele helped stimulate Pearson's long association with religious architecture, particularly of the Gothic style.

Pearson moved to London, where he became a pupil of Philip Hardwick (1792–1870), architect of the Euston Arch and Lincoln's Inn. He lived in central London at 13 Mansfield Street (where a blue plaque commemorates him). He was awarded the RIBA Royal Gold Medal in 1880.

== Career ==
From the erection of his first church, St Anne's Church, Ellerker, in Yorkshire, in 1843, to that of St Peter's, Vauxhall, in 1864, his buildings are geometrical in manner and exhibit a close adherence to precedent, but elegance of proportion and refinement of detail lift them out of the commonplace of mere imitation. Holy Trinity, Westminster (1848), and St Mary's, Dalton Holme (1858), are notable examples of this phase.

Pearson began his career drawing purely on English medieval prototypes, but increasingly incorporated ideas from abroad: Charles Locke Eastlake described Pearson's Christchurch at Appleton-le-Moors in North Yorkshire as "modelled on the earliest and severest type of French Gothic, with an admixture of details almost Byzantine in character."

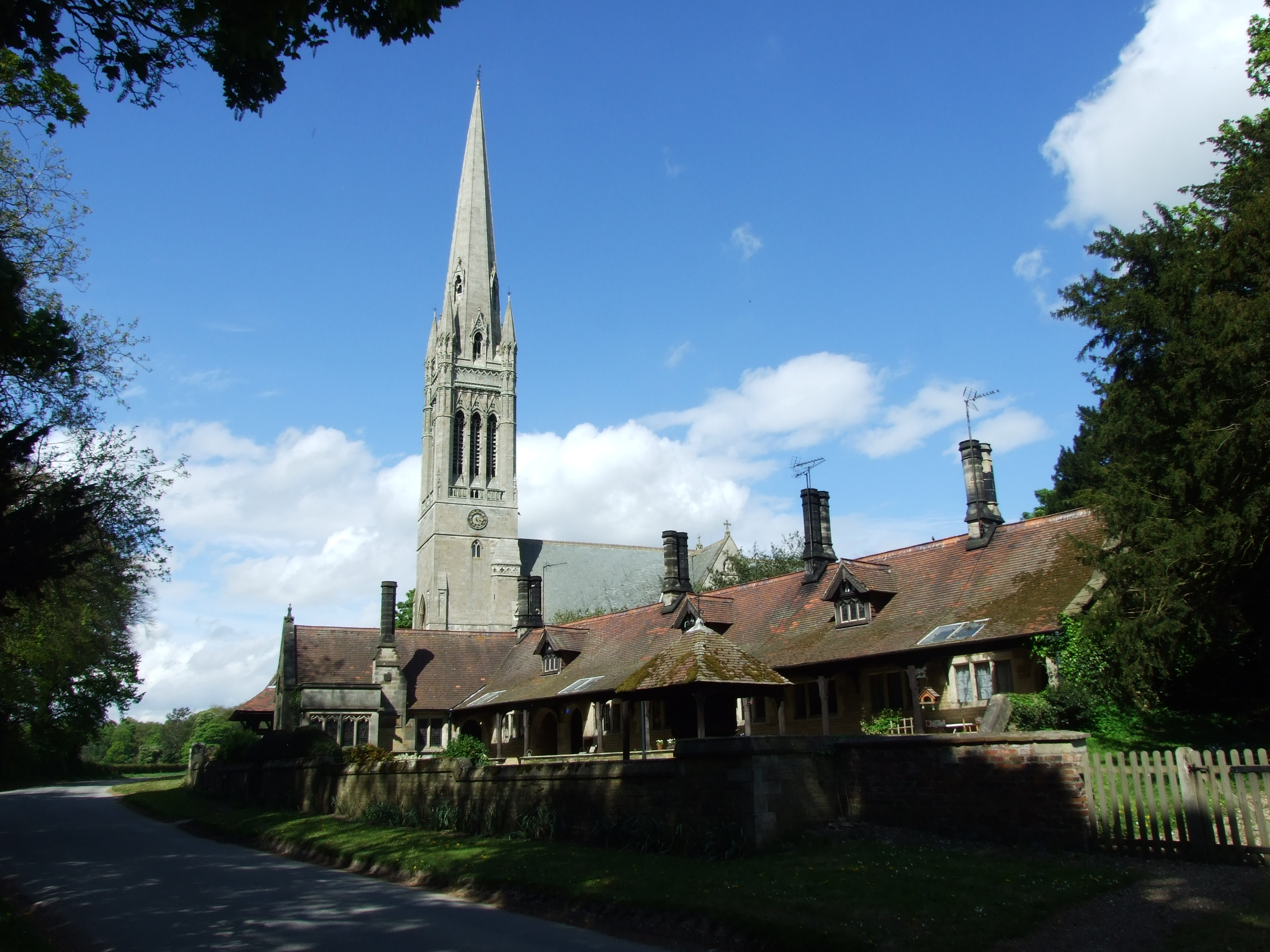
St Mary's Dalton Holme, East Yorkshire

St Peter's Church, Vauxhall (1864), was his first groined church, and the first of a series of buildings which brought Pearson to the forefront among his contemporaries. In these he applied the Early English style to modern needs and modern economy with unrivalled success. St Augustine's, Kilburn (1871), St John's, Red Lion Square, London (1874, destroyed by a parachute mine in 1941), St Alban's, Conybere Street, Birmingham (1880), St Michael's, Croydon (1880), St John's, Norwood (1881), St Stephen's, Bournemouth (1889), and All Saints Church, Hove (1889), are characteristic examples of his mature work. He also did restoration work on smaller churches, including St Edward's Church, Stow-on-the-Wold in Gloucestershire.

He was enlisted by Sir Tatton Sykes, 5th Baronet to develop the first of what now are known as "Sykes churches" near Sledmere. Initially Pearson restored the Church of St Michael and All Angels, Garton on the Wolds and the churches at Kirkburn, and Bishop Wilton, along with a new one at Hilton.

== Cathedrals ==
Pearson is best known for Truro Cathedral (1880), the first Anglican cathedral to be built in England since 1697. It has a special interest in its apt incorporation of the south aisle of the ancient church. Pearson's conservative spirit fitted him for the repair of ancient buildings, and among cathedrals and other historic buildings placed under his care were Lincoln, Chichester, Peterborough, Bristol and Exeter cathedrals, St George's Chapel, Windsor Castle, Westminster Hall, and Westminster Abbey, in the surveyorship of which he succeeded Sir George Gilbert Scott. He re-faced the north transept of Westminster Abbey, except for the porches (which are the work of Scott), and also designed the vigorous organ cases. In his handling of ancient buildings he was repeatedly opposed by the anti-restorers of the Society for the Protection of Ancient Buildings (as in the case of the west front of Peterborough Cathedral in 1896), but he generally proved the soundness of his judgment by his executed work.

While Truro Cathedral is considered his British masterpiece there are many who consider St John's Cathedral in Brisbane, Australia, his finest work. St John's was initially designed by Pearson and then by his son Frank following his father's death in 1897. The cathedral was constructed between 1906 and 2009 and is a study in contrast to Truro. While lacking some of the decorative detail found at Truro and having shorter towers, the cathedral also departs from the conventional Early English style Neo-Gothic Pearson used extensively at Truro. St John's employs a broad mix of styles: some early English Gothic (lancet windows and bell-shaped capitals in the piers); early French Gothic (the pyramidal spires of the towers, and the internal sexpartite vault of the ceiling, also used at Truro); and Spanish Gothic used extensively in the internal design of the nave and sanctuary. The form of Spanish Gothic used at St John's is based on Barcelona Cathedral. The Barcelona influence can be seen in the nave which has two walls forming double aisles; the inner wall forming the nave arcade which has a wide panel below the triforium to help keep out the subtropical sun. But the Spanish precedent can best been seen in the cathedral's large apsidal sanctuary (wholly different from the conventional English square-end at Truro) whose tall pillars reach from ground floor to the arches immediately below the vault, producing an effect of extraordinary complexity and beauty.

== Non-ecclesiastical buildings ==
Pearson's practice was not confined to church buildings. Treberfydd (1850), Quar Wood (1858), Lechlade Manor, an Elizabethan house (1873), Westwood House, Sydenham, in the French Renaissance style (1880), the Astor estate offices (1892) upon the Victoria Embankment, London, the remodelling of the interiors of Cliveden House (1893) and No. 18 Carlton House Terrace (1894), with many parsonages, show his aptitude for domestic architecture.

In general design he first aimed at form, embracing both proportion and contour; and his work may be recognized by accurate scholarship coupled with harmonious detail. Its keynotes are cautiousness and refinement rather than boldness.

== Recognition ==
He was elected an Associate of the Royal Academy in 1874, becoming a full member in 1880. He was also a fellow of the Society of Antiquaries, and a fellow and member of the Council of the Royal Institute of British Architects.

== Personal life ==
In 1862, Pearson married Jemima Christian, a cousin of his friend Ewan Christian, a Manxman and architect to the Ecclesiastical Commissioners. Their son Frank Loughborough Pearson (1864–1947) was born two years later, but to Pearson's great sorrow Jemima died on 25 March 1865 of typhoid fever. Frank followed in his father's footsteps completing much of his work before embarking on his own original designs.

Pearson is buried in the nave of Westminster Abbey, where his grave is marked by the appropriate motto Sustinuit et abstinuit.

== Legacy ==
In total, 198 churches created or worked on by Pearson are now listed buildings. In 2016, Historic England commissioned a selective assessment of the significance of The Church and Chapel Interiors of John Loughborough Pearson to help those caring for the buildings to understand the importance of interior fixtures and fittings—particularly movable furniture, which is not covered by listing but a key part of the original designs.

== Some notable buildings ==
=== Australia ===
- St John's Cathedral, Brisbane, Queensland (Pearson's design was re-worked by his son, Frank, and was finally completed in 2009).

=== England ===
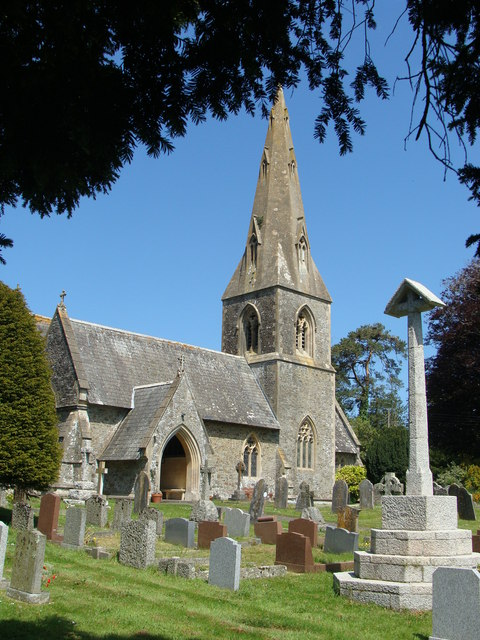
St Matthew's Church, Landscove, Devon.

- Bristol Cathedral, Bristol (Added the twin towers of the west front).
- Emmanuel College, Cambridge, Cambridgeshire (Additions 1893).
- University Library, Cambridge, Cambridgeshire (Additions 1889).
- Sidney Sussex College, Cambridge, Cambridgeshire (Additions 1890).
- Truro Cathedral, Truro, Cornwall (Constructed 1879–1910).
- St Matthew's Church, Landscove, Devon (Constructed 1854).
- All Saints' Church, Torquay, Devon (Constructed 1884).
- St Mary's Church, Catherston Leweston, Dorset (Constructed 1857–58).
- Church of St Michael and All Angels, Garton on the Wolds, East Riding of Yorkshire (Restoration 1856–57).
- Church of All Saints, North Ferriby, East Riding of Yorkshire
- St Barnabas Church, Hove, East Sussex (1882–83).
- St Matthew's Church, Silverhill, East Sussex (Constructed 1884).
- All Hallow's Church, Barking, Greater London (Restoration 1893).
- St Helen's Church, Bishopsgate, Greater London (Restoration 1891).
- St Michael's Church, Chiswick, Greater London (Restoration 1882).
- Astor Estate Office, Embankment, Greater London (Constructed 1895).
- Fitzrovia Chapel, Fitzrovia, Greater London (Constructed 1890).
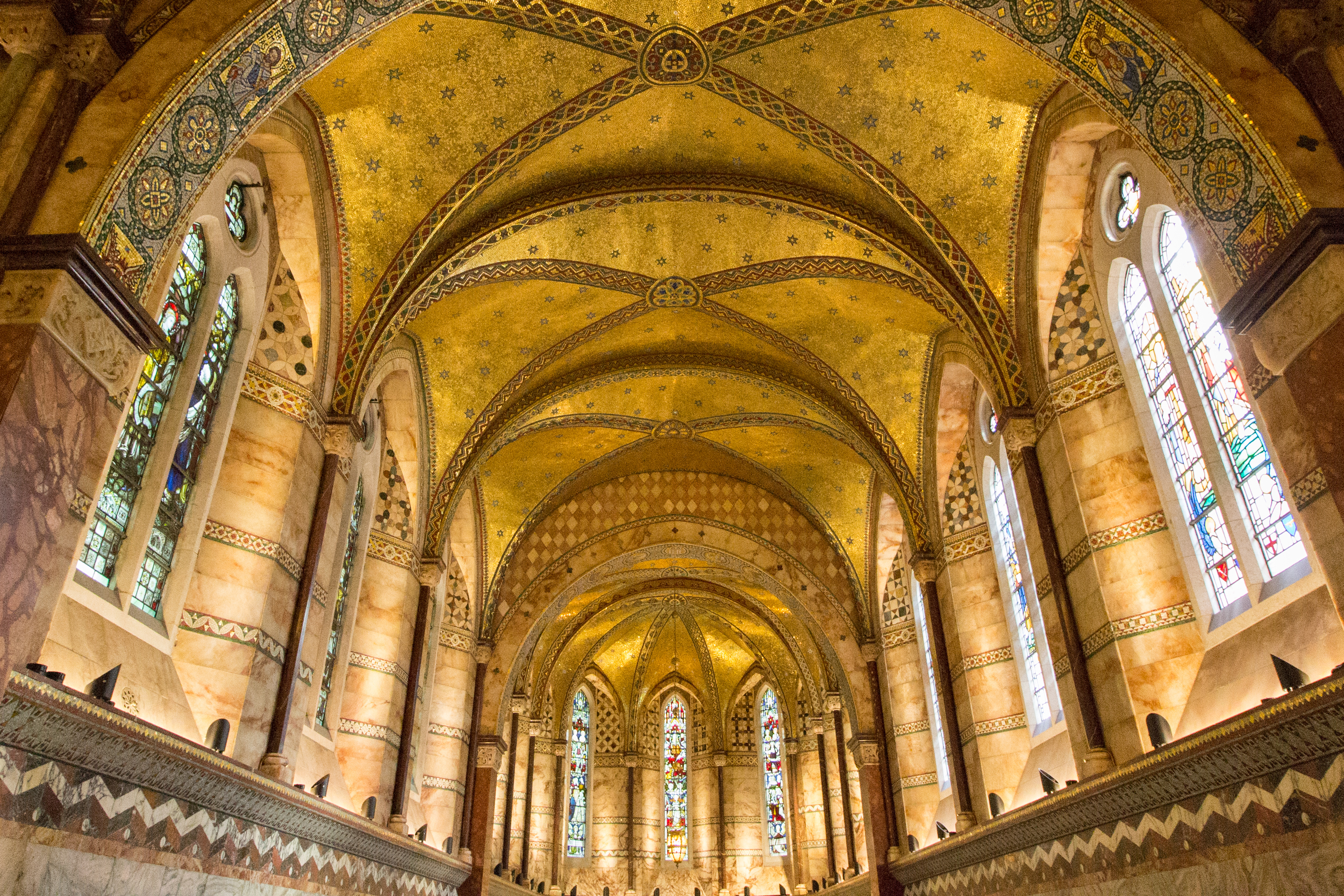
  Fitzrovia Chapel
- St John's Church, Friern Barnet, Greater London (Constructed 1890).
- St Augustine's Church, Kilburn, Greater London (Constructed 1871–1880, tower and spire completed 1897–98).
- St Peter's Home, Kilburn, Greater London (Constructed 1868).
- Catholic Apostolic Church, Maida Vale, Greater London (Constructed 1891–93).
- St John the Evangelist's Church, Upper Norwood, Greater London (Constructed 1878–1887).
- St Peter's Church, Vauxhall, Greater London (Constructed 1863–64).
- St Michael's Church, Ledbury, Herefordshire (Restoration 1894).
- St Leonard's Church, Hythe, Kent (Restoration 1887).
- All Saints' Church, Maidstone, Kent (Restoration 1885).
- St Mary's Minster, Stow, Lincolnshire (Restoration in 1850).
- St Bartholomew's Church, Thurstaston, Merseyside (Constructed 1886).
- Church of St Agnes and St Pancras, Toxteth, Merseyside.
- St Nicholas' Minster, Great Yarmouth, Norfolk
- St George's Church, Cullercoats, Northumberland (Constructed 1882).
- St John's Church, Acaster Selby, North Yorkshire (Completed 1850).
- Christ Church, Appleton-le-Moors, North Yorkshire.
- Church of St Mary, Lastingham, North Yorkshire. (Constructed 1879).
- St Paul's Church, Daybrook, Nottinghamshire (Constructed 1896).
- St Bartholomew's Church, Nottingham, Nottinghamshire (Finished by his son, 1899–1902).
- St Mary's Church, Parsonage and School, Freeland, Oxfordshire (Constructed 1869–1871).
- New College Chapel, Oxford, Oxfordshire (Completed 1889).
- St Swithun's Church, Cheswardine, Shropshire (Rebuilt 1889).
- Shrewsbury Abbey, Shrewsbury, Shropshire (Restoration 1886).
- Holy Trinity Church, Wentworth, South Yorkshire (Constructed 1872).
- St Paul's Church, Walsall, Staffordshire
- Church of St John the Evangelist, Redhill, Surrey (Constructed 1889).
- St James' Church, Weybridge, Surrey (Completed 1853).
- Convalescent Home, Woking, Surrey (Completed 1884).
- St Patrick's Church, Bordesley, Warwickshire (Constructed 1896, Demolished 1964).
- St Margaret's Church, City of Westminster (Added the eastern and western porches).
- St Michael and All Angels Church, Headingley, West Yorkshire (Completed 1884).
- Church of St Margaret, Horsforth, West Yorkshire (Constructed 1874).
- Wakefield Cathedral, Wakefield, West Yorkshire (Added the east end after the church was given cathedral status. It was completed in 1905 by his son, Frank).

=== Isle of Man ===
- Kirk Braddan, Douglas (Constructed 1873).

=== Malta ===
- Lady Hamilton-Gordon Memorial Chapel, Gwardamanġa (Constructed 1893–1894).

=== Scotland ===
- Church of the Holy Trinity, Ayr, Ayrshire (Constructed 1886).

=== Wales ===
- St Tydfil's Church, Merthyr Tydfil, Glamorganshire (Constructed 1895).
- St Theodore's Church, Port Talbot, Glamorganshire (Constructed 1895).

== Gallery ==
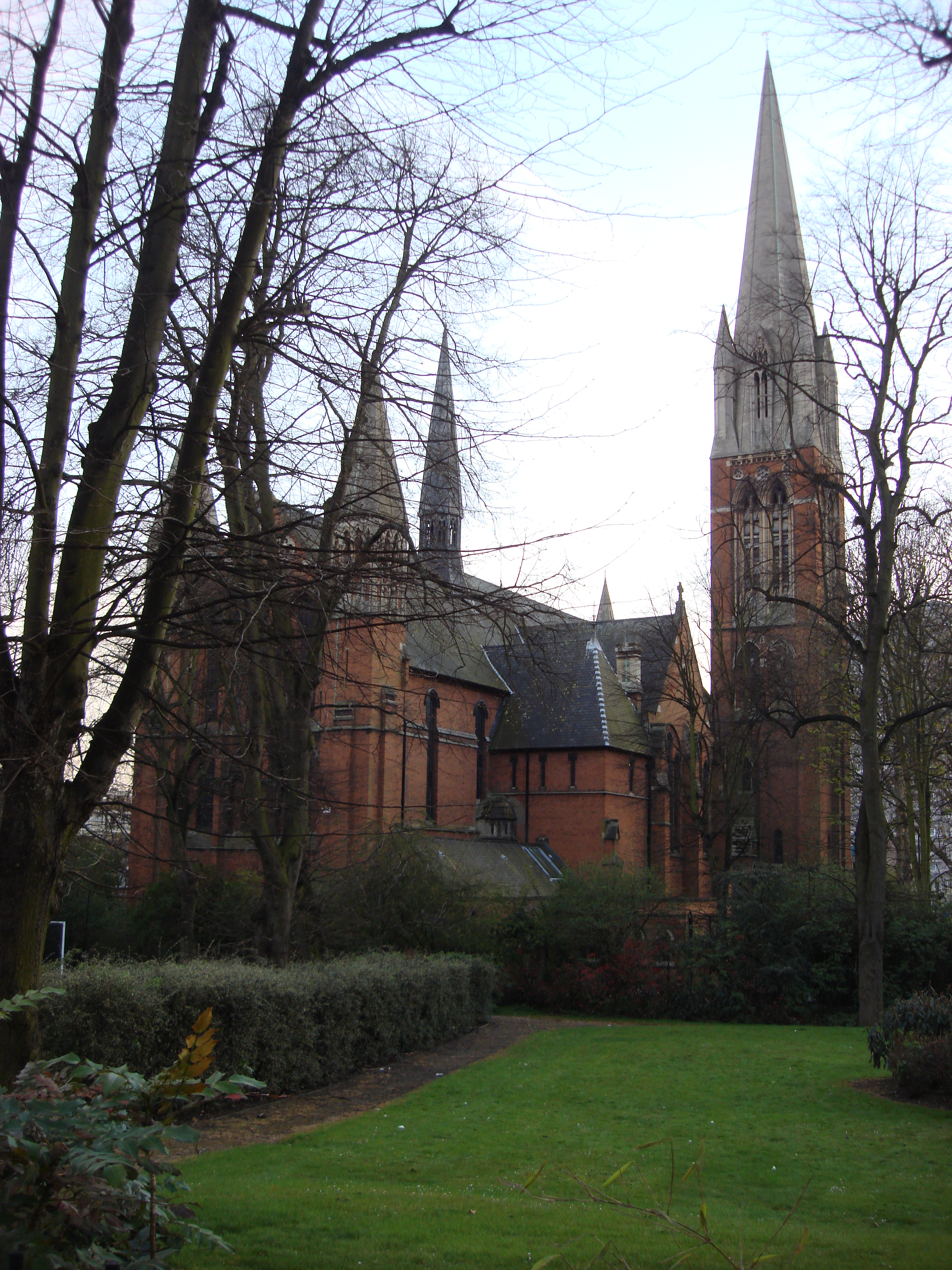
St Augustine's, Kilburn

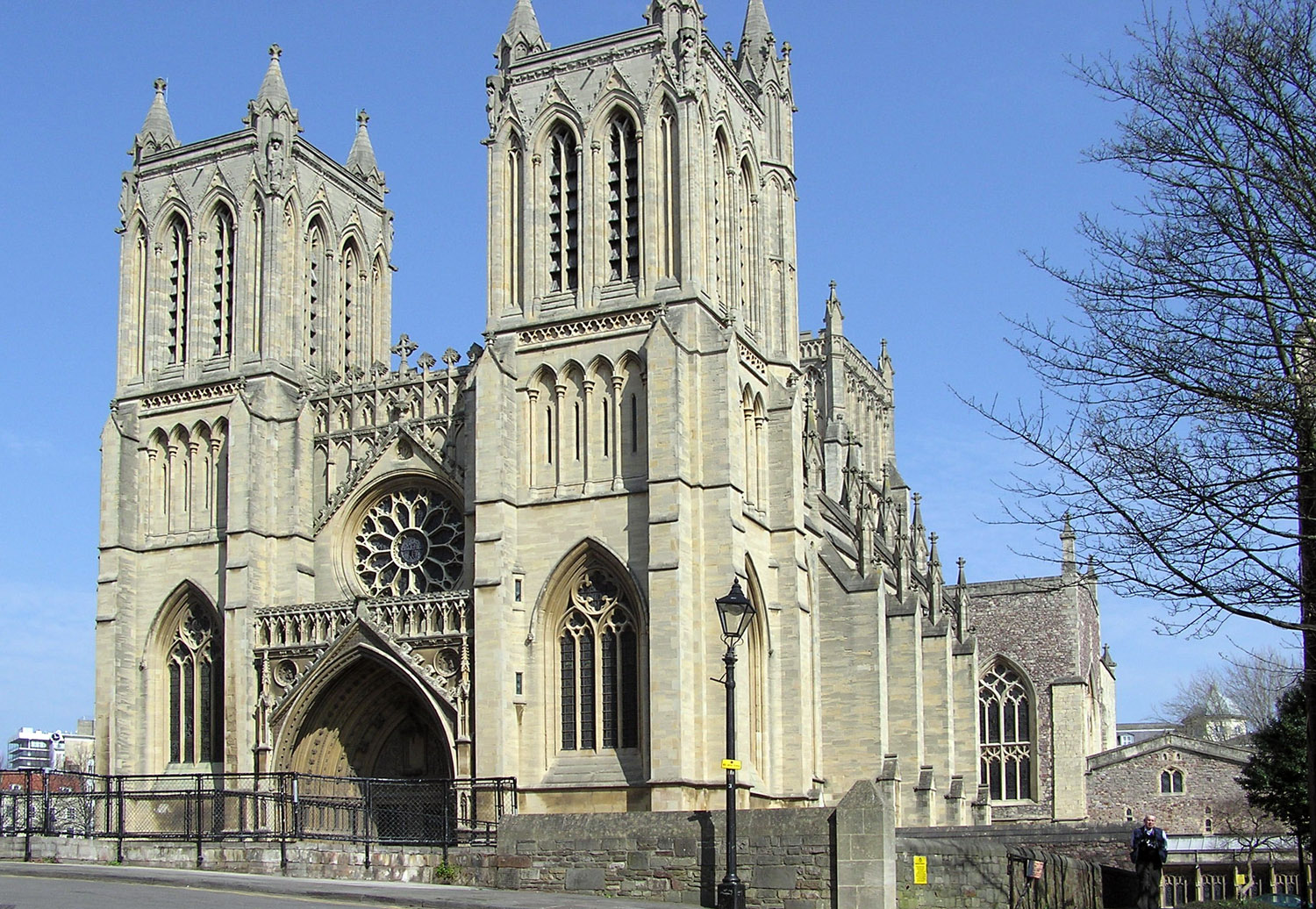
Bristol Cathedral West front

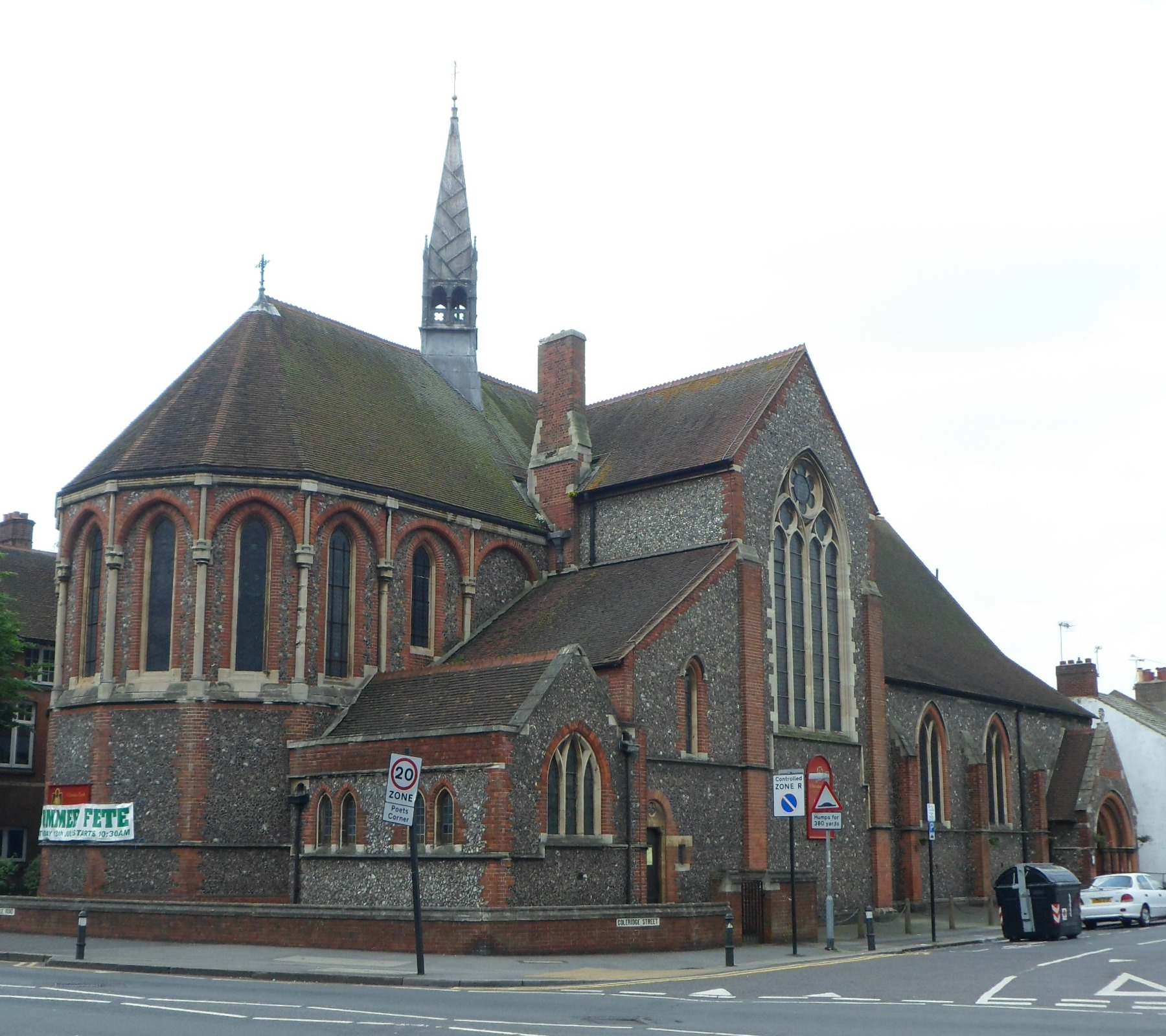
St Barnabas Church, Hove

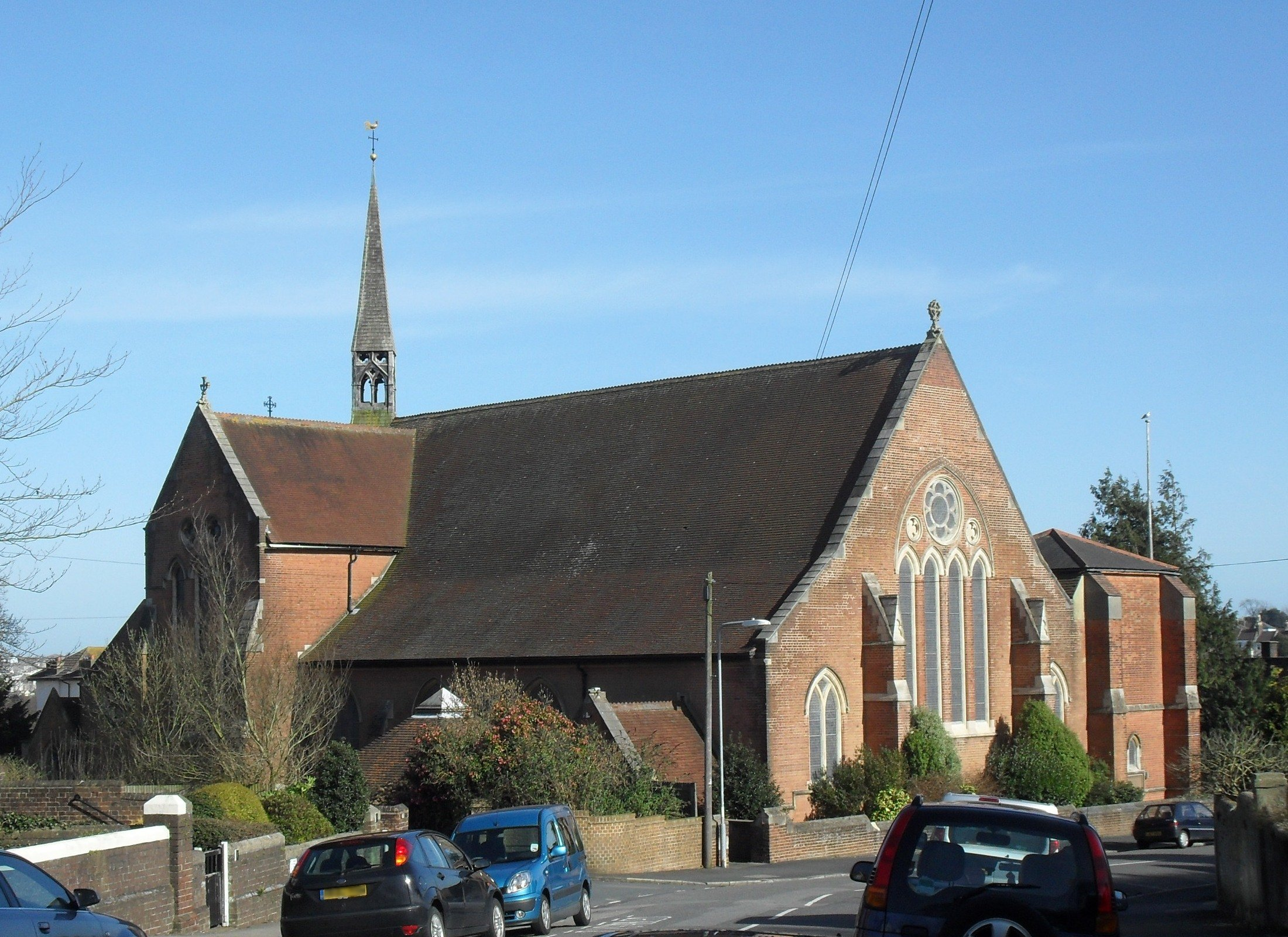
St Matthew's Church, Silverhill, Hastings

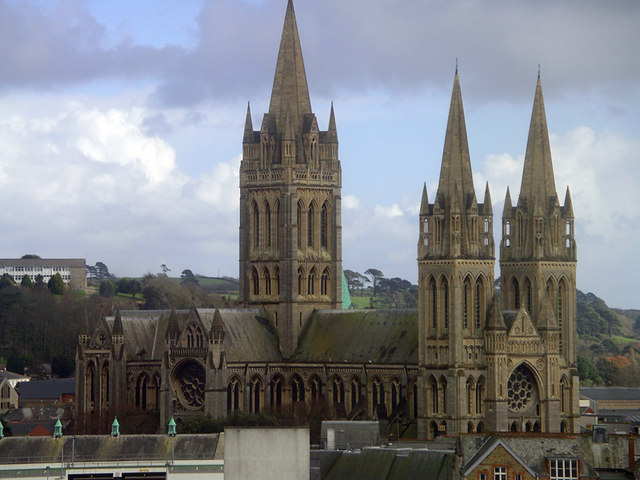
Truro Cathedral from the north-west

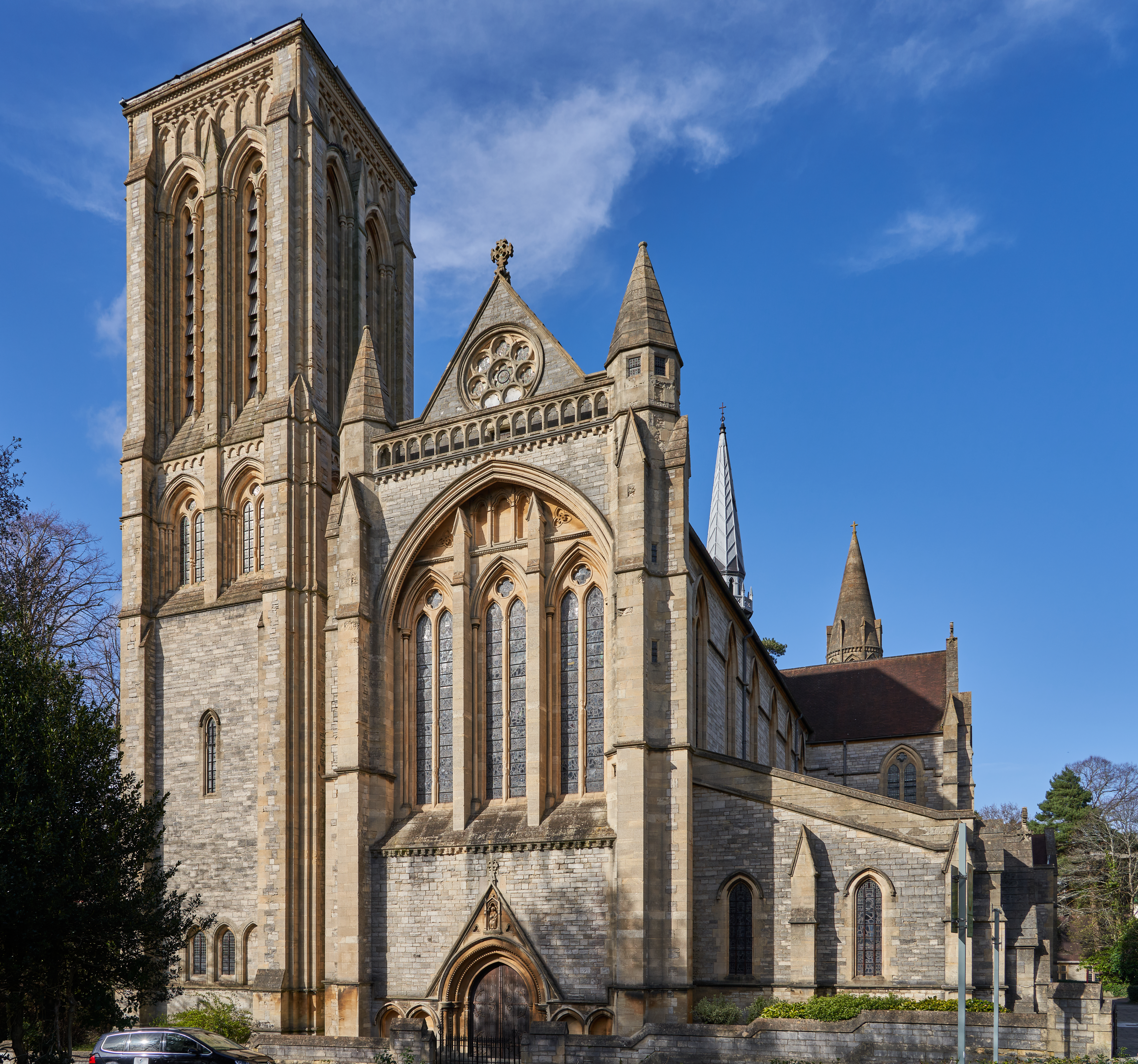
St Stephen's Church, Bournemouth

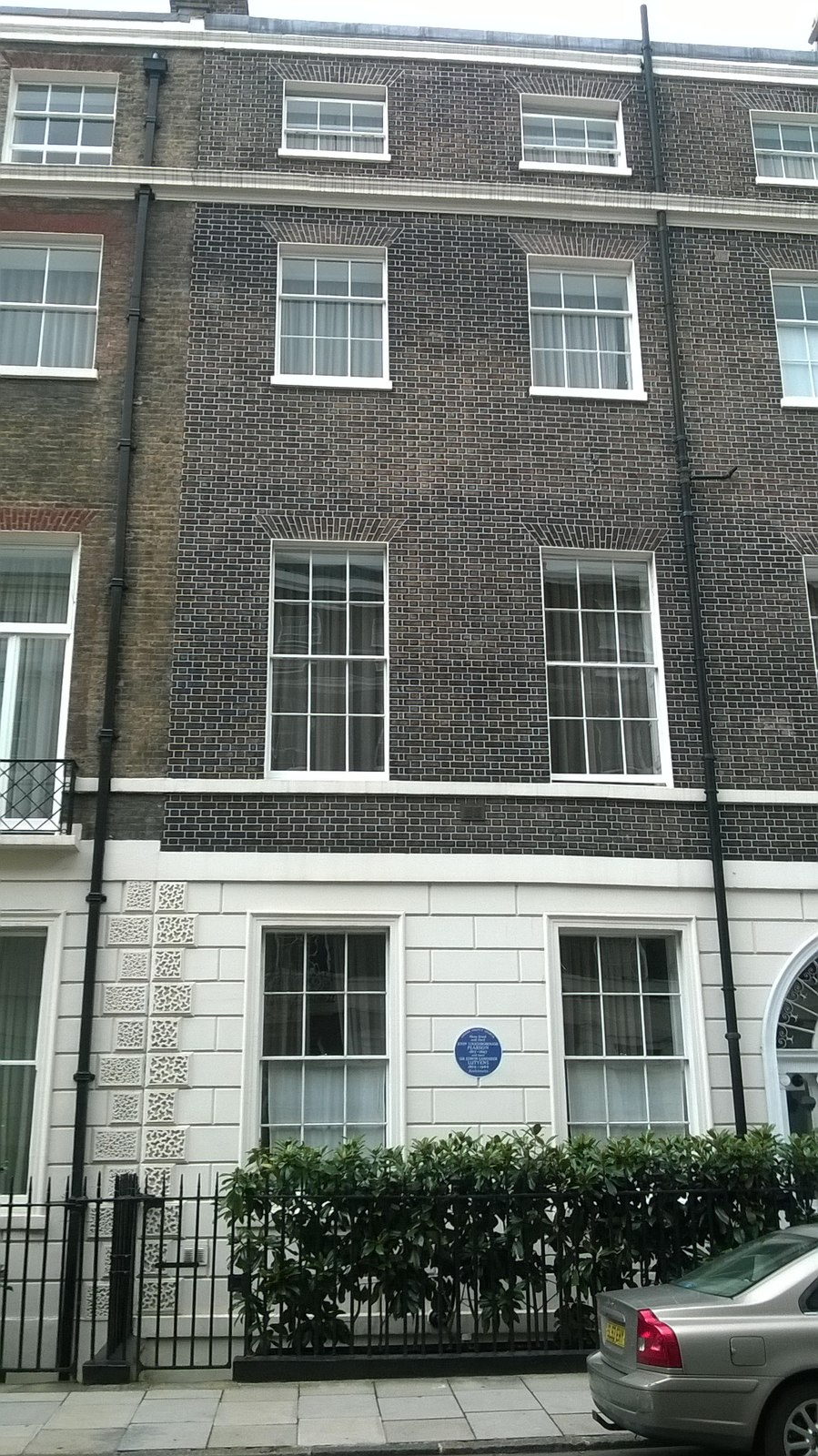
13, Mansfield Street, London, home to Pearson and later Edwin Lutyens

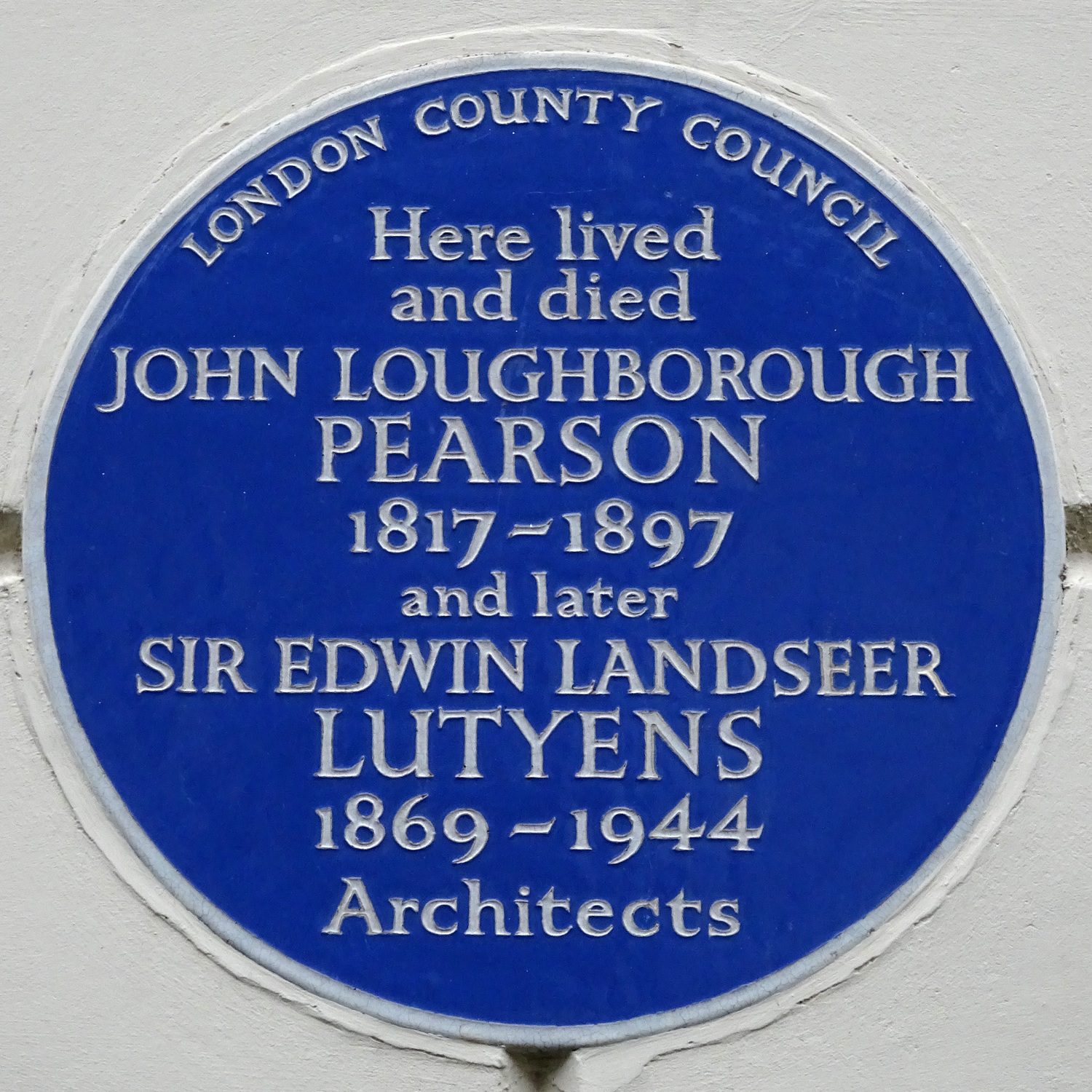
Blue plaque to Pearson and Lutyens

== See also ==
- List of new ecclesiastical buildings by J. L. Pearson
- List of ecclesiastical restorations and alterations by J. L. Pearson
- List of non-ecclesiastical works by J. L. Pearson
