= Quarwood =

Residence in Gloucestershire, England

Coordinates: 51.920366°N 1.727901°W

General information
- Type: Residential
- Architectural style: Victorian
- Location: Swell, Gloucestershire, England
- Completed: 1859

Technical details
- Structural system: Brick and stone
- Floor count: 4

Design and construction
- Architect: John Loughborough Pearson

Quarwood or Quar Wood is a Victorian manor near Stow-on-the-Wold, Gloucestershire, England. It was formerly owned by the Who's bassist John Entwistle.

== Description ==
The Rhenish Gothic house is built on a hill in Lower Swell, approached by a long driveway accessed from the A429 Stow Hill (the Fosse Way) and through an entrance with two stone pillars decorated with lion plinths. The house, which includes a saddle roof and open loggia, has 55 rooms.

The main hallway features a cantilevered staircase with wrought-iron baluster and oak handrail which leads to a galleried landing. A formal drawing room has an open fireplace with a timber surround. The Cotswold landscape is visible through picture windows, and formal gardens include terraces and a croquet lawn facing south toward the Dikler river valley. When Entwistle bought the home, he installed two recording studios, one on the main floor and one on the top floor, and a bar with game rooms. Known for a macabre sense of humour, Entwistle kept skeletons in the master bedroom to frighten guests.

The grounds enclose 42 acres, including parkland, fish ponds, paddocks, garages, woodlands and seven cottages.

== History ==
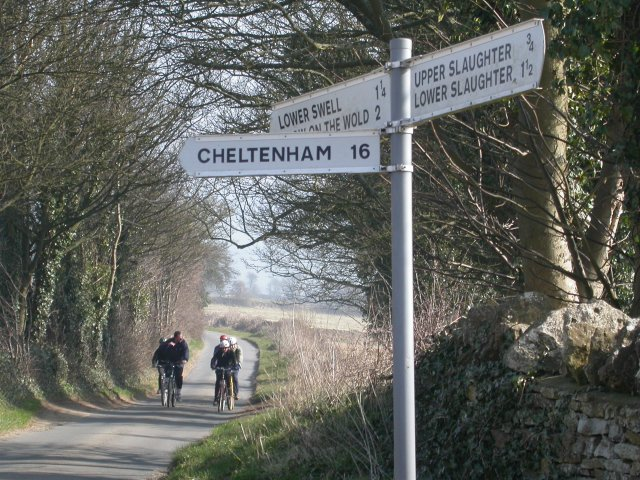
Crossroads of narrow road near Stow-on-the-Wold, looking towards Lower Swell and the town in 2010

The house was designed by architect John Loughborough Pearson and built in 1856–59 for £8,000 (equivalent to £740,000 in 2025) for Reverend Robert William Hippisley, who was the local parish priest (rector) (1844–1899). The parish's lucrative farming and malting across its 12.7 km^{2} (5 sq mi) provided a then-record salary for that parish of £525 by 1870. Pearson had previously designed Treberfydd in Brecknockshire for Robert Raikes (1818–1901), Hippisley's brother-in-law and grandson of Robert Raikes, a wealthy Anglican minister who increased junior education during and after the Industrial Revolution through expanding a nationwide charity for Sunday schools. Pearson had completed restoration work on St Edward's Church.

Quarwood was extensively remodeled in 1954–58 by Sir Denys Lowson. It was owned by Lord Wolfson of Sunningdale in the late 1960s. The estate was managed by a paid couple who were given the house as tied accommodation as part of their remuneratiuon; Wolfson "bed-and-breakfasted" with the young family, which included the infant Diana Fox Carney. The Who's bass guitarist John Entwistle and his wife Alison bought the property as a weekend retreat in 1976, and Entwistle occupied the house until his death in 2002. In 2004 his son Christopher offered the house for sale at a price of £3.75 million (equivalent to £6,770,000 in 2025). The house is currently owned by Piet Pulford.

== See also ==
- List of non-ecclesiastical works by J. L. Pearson
