= Treberfydd =

Treberfydd House
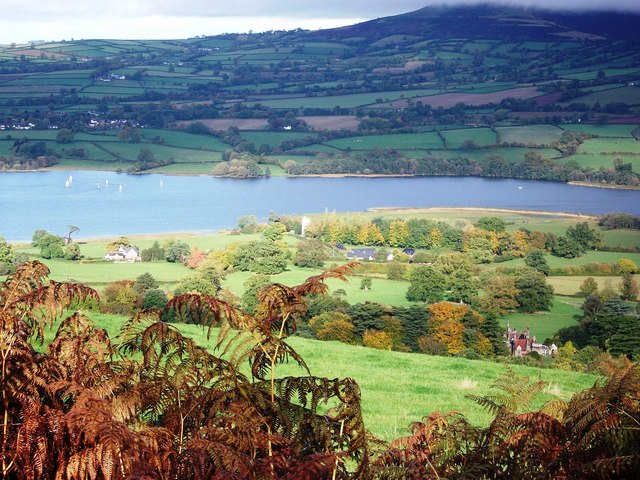
- Distant view of Treberfydd in the lower-right corner

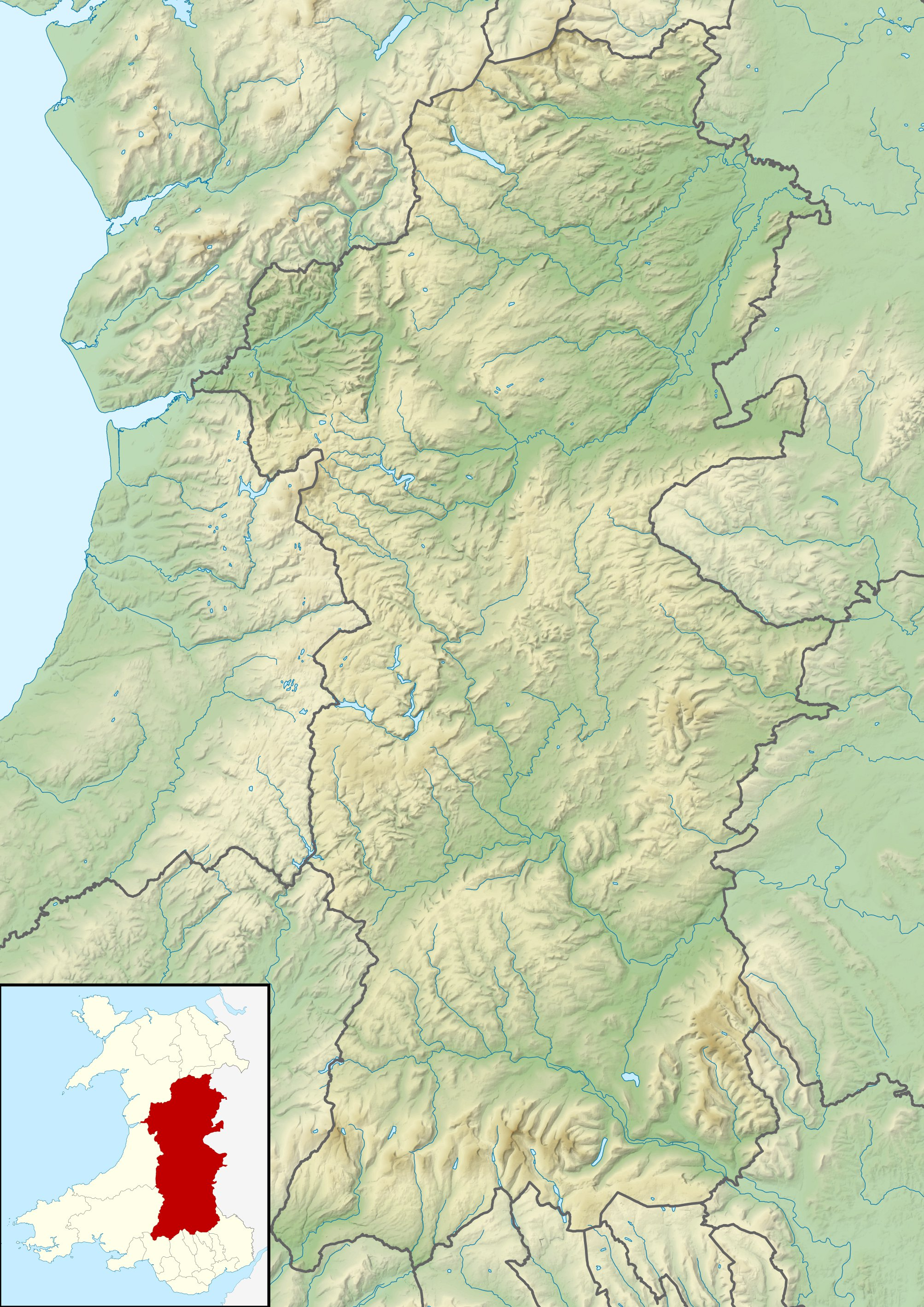
- Location within Powys
- 51.9213°N 3.2674°W
- Type: House
- Location: Llangors, Powys, Wales

History
- Built: 1848-1852

Site notes
- Architect: John Loughborough Pearson
- Architectural style: Gothic Revival
- Governing body: Privately owned

Listed Building – Grade I
- Official name: Treberfydd (also known as Treberfedd)
- Designated: 17 January 1963
- Reference no.: 6757

Listed Building – Grade II*
- Official name: Stable courtyard at Treberfydd
- Designated: 17 January 1963
- Reference no.: 20284

Listed Building – Grade II
- Official name: Entrance gateway and wall at Treberfydd
- Designated: 21 August 1998
- Reference no.: 20334

Listed Building – Grade II
- Official name: Walled garden at Treberfydd
- Designated: 21 August 1998
- Reference no.: 20289

Listed Building – Grade II
- Official name: Walled terrace and steps in Treberfydd garden
- Designated: 21 August 1998
- Reference no.: 20291

Treberfydd House is a Gothic Revival house, built in 1847–50 just south of Llangorse Lake in the Brecon Beacons National Park in South Wales, to the designs of architect John Loughborough Pearson. It remains the private home of the Raikes family and is a Grade I listed building. The gardens are listed on the Cadw/ICOMOS Register of Parks and Gardens of Special Historic Interest in Wales.

== History ==
The house was built for Robert Raikes (1818–1901), grandson of Robert Raikes (1765–1837), a Hull-based banker. Robert Raikes was a prominent member of the Oxford-based Christian Tractarian movement, and moved his family to Wales in order to promote his beliefs and assist in the development of the area. The house was designed by John Loughborough Pearson, a young architect who was just beginning to experiment with the revived Gothic style of architecture. Pearson had already done some work for Raikes in the Hull area, including a chapel for his grandmother. Pearson was also asked by Raikes to modernise the church at Llangasty and build a school – both of which are at the end of the lane which leads down to Llangorse Lake. The church, the interior of which is "an almost untouched Tractarian survival", is still in use, but the school is now a private house. Pearson became a well-known architect – he designed Truro Cathedral among other notable buildings.

The Raikes involved themselves in local society, Raikes becoming High Sheriff of Brecknockshire in 1851. (Note: While her husband undertook the traditional tasks of a local squire, Mrs Raikes trained a choir for their rebuilt church and accompanied the singers on the organ.) Their later years were challenging; the failure of Raikes Bank in the 1860s saw the house being leased for over twenty years, before becoming the family home again in 1895. The most prominent tenants during that time were Abraham Darby IV and his wife Matilda Frances, of Coalbrookdale, owner of the Ebbw Vale Steel Works. Abraham Darby died at Treberfydd in 1878. The house remains a private home and events venue, but is opened to the public for a limited number of weeks each summer.

Treberfydd's gardens were designed by W.A. Nesfield. Elaborate flowerbeds were laid out in the pattern of the Raikes monogram, although these have not survived.

=== Filming ===
In 2007 Treberfydd featured in "Human Nature" and "Family of Blood" in the BBC Wales series of Doctor Who and again in 2012 in the Christmas Special.

== Architecture and description ==
The architectural historian Mark Girouard notes the influence of Augustus Pugin on Treberfydd's design. Robert Scourfield and Richard Haslam, in their 2013 revision of the Powys Pevsner Buildings of Wales series, follow Girouard, and consider that the house is "better than the massing of [Pugin's] Scarisbrick Hall or Alton". The house was built of stone dug out of the fields in front of the house, and is decorated with gargoyles, gables and stained glass windows. It contains a collection of furniture, numerous carved stone fireplaces and Minton floor tiles, all of which were designed by the architect. (Note: Mark Girouard suggests that, while Pearson designed the furniture, the makers were likely John G. Crace and Son.) Treberfydd is surrounded by 11 acres (45,000 m^{2}) of landscaped gardens.

The house is Grade I listed, being an "outstanding early Tudor Revival house ...with excellent detail inside and out, the interior retaining almost all its original fittings." It is also the earliest surviving major work by John Loughborough Pearson. The stable court has a Grade II* listing, and the entrance gateway, walled garden, terrace walling and steps, and a garden cottage are listed at Grade II. The gardens are listed, at Grade II*, on the Cadw/ICOMOS Register of Parks and Gardens of Special Historic Interest in Wales.

== See also ==
- List of non-ecclesiastical works by J. L. Pearson
- List of gardens in Wales

== Sources ==
- Caroe, William Douglas (1911). "Pearson, John Loughborough" . In Chisholm, Hugh (ed.). Encyclopædia Britannica. Vol. 21 (11th ed.). Cambridge University Press.
- Girouard, Mark (1979). The Victorian Country House. London: Yale University Press. ISBN 978-0-300-03472-1.
- Jenkins, Simon (2008). Wales: Churches, Houses, Castles. London: Penguin Books. ISBN 978-0-713-99893-1.
- Scourfield, Robert; Haslam, Richard (2013). Powys: Montgomeryshire, Radnorshire and Breconshire. The Buildings of Wales. New Haven, US and London: Yale University Press. ISBN 978-0-300-18508-9.
