= Caleb Robinson =

English cricketer

Personal information
- Full name: Caleb Robinson
- Born: 13 May 1828; Otley, Yorkshire, England
- Died: 1906 (aged 77/78); Wharfedale, Yorkshire, England
- Batting: Unknown
- Bowling: Unknown

Domestic team information
- Years: Team
- 1861–1862: Marylebone Cricket Club

Umpiring information
- FC umpired: 4 (1861–1874)

Career statistics
Competition	First-class
Matches	4
Runs scored	67
Batting average	9.57
100s/50s	–/–
Top score	21
Balls bowled	289
Wickets	13
Bowling average	8.58
5 wickets in innings	–
10 wickets in match	–
Best bowling	4/20
Catches/stumpings	1/–
- Source: Cricinfo, 25 September 2021

Caleb Robinson (13 May 1828 – 1906) was an English professional first-class cricketer and umpire.

Robinson was born at Otley in May 1828. He was a professional cricketer and was associated with a number of club sides in the North of England. He first appeared in first-class cricket in 1860 for an England Next XIV against an England First XI at Lord's. In 1861 and 1862, he made four further first-class appearances for the Marylebone Cricket Club against Oxford University, Sussex, Hampshire and Middlesex. As a batsman, Robinson scored 67 runs in his five first-class matches, with a highest score of 21. As a bowler he took 13 wickets at a good average of 8.58, with best figures of 4 for 20. A benefit match was held between Otley and a United All-England Eleven for Robinson and fellow Otley cricketer William Swain in 1863, with the Otley side featuring Tom Emmett.

In the same year cricket took Robinson to the South West England, where he was employed as a cricket coach at Sherborne School in 1863. Besides a career as a professional player, Robinson also stood as an umpire in four first-class matches from 1861 to 1874. Robinson died in 1906 at Wharfedale, Yorkshire.
