= William Swain (cricketer) =

English cricketer

Personal information
- Full name: William Swain
- Born: 8 September 1830; Burley, Yorkshire, England
- Died: 5 October 1910 (aged 80); East Brisbane, Queensland, Australia
- Batting: Right-handed
- Bowling: Right-arm roundarm fast/slow

Domestic team information
- Years: Team
- 1864: Marylebone Cricket Club

Career statistics
Competition	First-class
Matches	2
Runs scored	22
Batting average	11.00
100s/50s	–/–
Top score	13*
Catches/stumpings	–/–
- Source: Cricinfo, 13 June 2021

William Swain (8 September 1827 – 5 October 1910) was an English first-class cricketer, businessman and inventor.

The son of William and Jane Swain, he was born in September 1830 at Burley, Yorkshire. A fast bowler, he adopted the roundarm style of bowling in 1836, at the age of eleven. Swain was a successful cricket coach and was engaged by Christ Church, Oxford in 1857, where he coached for the next nine years. During this time he coached the future King Edward VII, whose connections he would use to expand his business contacts. As a club cricketer, he was employed by a number of clubs between 1857 and 1876, predominantly in the North of England, often coaching alongside playing. A benefit match was held between Otley and a United All-England Eleven for Robinson and fellow Otley cricketer Caleb Robinson in 1863, with the Otley side featuring Tom Emmett. He was engaged by the Marylebone Cricket Club in 1864, playing two first-class matches for the club at Lord's against Cambridge University and Oxford University, scoring 22 runs. He was described by Scores and Biographies as a player who "bats in good style, is a nice field, either at point or long-stop". His fielding was so well regarded that he was described by Bell's Life as "the best fielder in Yorkshire, if not in all England". He went into business twice, running a cricket outfitters shop at Halifax in the late 1860s and a tailoring business in the early 1880s at Bradford. Swain invented one of the first mechanical bowling machines in 1870, calling it a cricket battery.

He emigrated to Australia with his family in 1884, settling in Queensland. There he continued his connection to cricket, coaching many future players of the Queensland cricket team. Swain died at East Brisbane in October 1910.
