= 2023–24 National League 2 North =

Rugby union competition in England

- Countries: England
- Date: 2 September 2023 – 27 April 2024
- Champions: Rotherham Titans (2nd title)
- Relegated: Huddersfield
- Matches played: 182
- Attendance: 69,848 (average 384 per match)
- Highest attendance: 1,800 – Preston Grasshoppers v Fylde, 9 September 2023
- Lowest attendance: 112 – Otley v Lymm, 14 October 2023
- Tries scored: 1484 (average 8.2 per match)
- Top point scorer: 327 – Richard Hayes (Rotherham Titans)
- Top try scorer: 24 – Samuel Taylor (Otley)

The 2023–24 National League 2 North is the 36th season of the fourth-tier (north) of the English domestic rugby union competitions; one of three at this level. The others are National League 2 East and National League 2 West. The champions are promoted to National League 1 and the bottom two teams are relegated to either Regional 1 North East or Regional 1 North West, depending on their location.

Rotherham Titans finished the season as champions on 27 April 2024 following an away win against Billingham. The title battle went right to the last day of the season, with Titans finishing just two points clear of Yorkshire rivals Leeds Tykes who had looked certain champions up until very last few games, with Rotherham's home win over Tykes on 23 March 2024 ultimately being the catalyst for who would take the league. In winning the league Rotherham would be promoted back into the 2024–25 National League 1 after an absence of four seasons.

Huddersfield were the first side to be relegated, losing away to Billingham on 23 March 2024 to go down with three games left to play. The battle for the second relegation spot would go all the way until the end of the season, with Billingham's bonus point loss against champions Rotherham, being just enough to see them pip Hull Ionians by virtue of a better points for against record, with both sides equal on 44 points apiece. Despite finishing 13th, Ionians resounding 94-26 victory against already relegated Huddersfield, was enough to see them stay up as the best ranked National League 2 side, as they had a better for and against record than the 2023–24 National League 2 East side Wimbledon who also finished on 44 points and had an equal number of wins (6). In the end the only relegated club from National League 2 North, Huddersfield would drop down to Regional 1 North East after spending six seasons at level 4.

== Structure ==
The league consists of fourteen teams and each play the others on a home and away basis, to make a total of 26 matches each. The champions are promoted to National League 1 and typically the last two teams are relegated to Regional 1 North East or Regional 1 North West; depending on their location.

Due to the liquidation of RFU Championship side Jersey Reds in September 2023 and the knock on effect on the league system, the best placed 13th placed side in the three National 2 leagues (National League 2 North, National League 2 East, National 2 West) will be saved from relegation. See Relegation (13th placed teams).

The results of the matches contribute points to the league as follows:

- 4 points are awarded for a win
- 2 points are awarded for a draw
- 0 points are awarded for a loss, however
- 1 losing (bonus) point is awarded to a team that loses a match by 7 points or fewer
- 1 additional (bonus) point is awarded to a team scoring 4 tries or more in a match.

=== Participating teams and locations ===
Locations of the 2023–24 National League 2 North teams

Team	Ground	Capacity	City/Area	Previous season
Billingham	Greenwood Road	1,500 (100 seats)	Billingham, County Durham	Promoted from Regional 1 North East (1st)
Fylde	Woodlands Memorial Ground	7,500 (500 seats)	Lytham St. Annes, Lancashire	2nd
Huddersfield	Lockwood Park	1,500 (500 seats)	Huddersfield, West Yorkshire	12th
Hull	Ferens Ground	1,500 (288 seats)	Kingston upon Hull, East Riding	Relegated from 2022–23 National League 1 (14th)
Hull Ionians	Brantingham Park	1,500 (240 seats)	Brantingham, East Riding	3rd
Leeds Tykes	The Sycamores	1,500	Bramhope, Leeds, West Yorkshire	Relegated from 2022–23 National League 1 (13th)
Lymm	Crouchley Lane	1,000	Lymm, Cheshire	Promoted from Regional 1 North West (1st)
Otley	Cross Green	7,000 (852 seats)	Otley, Leeds, West Yorkshire	5th
Preston Grasshoppers	Lightfoot Green	2,250 (250 seats)	Preston, Lancashire	11th
Rotherham Titans	Clifton Lane	2,500	Rotherham, South Yorkshire	4th
Sheffield	Abbeydale Park	3,200 (100 seats)	Sheffield, South Yorkshire	10th
Sheffield Tigers	Dore Moor	1,000	Sheffield, South Yorkshire	9th
Tynedale	Tynedale Park	2,000 (400 seats)	Corbridge, Northumberland	6th
Wharfedale	The Avenue	2,000	Threshfield, North Yorkshire	8th

== League table ==
2023–24 National League 2 North table
Pos	Team	Pld	W	D	L	PF	PA	PD	TB	LB	Pts	Result
1	Rotherham Titans (C)	26	25	0	1	970	472	+498	22	1	123	Promoted
2	Leeds Tykes	26	24	0	2	1111	483	+628	23	2	121	
3	Sheffield	26	17	1	8	801	638	+163	18	4	92	
4	Wharfedale	26	17	0	9	673	504	+169	13	3	84	
5	Fylde	26	13	1	12	775	685	+90	18	7	79	
6	Tynedale	26	13	1	12	705	680	+25	16	7	77	
7	Sheffield Tigers	26	13	1	12	689	737	−48	12	2	68	
8	Hull	26	13	1	12	683	799	−116	11	2	67	
9	Otley	26	9	1	16	722	773	−51	14	9	61	
10	Lymm	26	9	1	16	724	902	−178	12	5	55	
11	Preston Grasshoppers	26	8	1	17	747	920	−173	14	6	54	
12	Billingham	26	7	2	17	576	787	−211	9	3	44	
13	Hull Ionians (Note: The liquidation of Jersey Reds meant that Hull Ionians were saved from relegation as the best 13th placed side in National 2.)	26	6	1	19	730	916	−186	11	7	44	
14	Huddersfield (R)	26	2	1	23	574	1184	−610	11	2	23	Relegated

Updated to match(es) played on 27 April 2024. Source: National League 2 North RFU
Rules for classification: If teams are level at any stage, tiebreakers are applied in the following order:
1. Number of matches won
2. Difference between points for and against
3. Total number of points for
4. Aggregate number of points scored in matches between tied teams
5. Number of matches won excluding the first match, then the second and so on until the tie is settled
  (C) Champion; (R) Relegated
  Notes:

=== Relegation (13th placed teams) ===
National League 2 relegation
Pos	Grp	Team	Pld	W	D	L	PF	PA	PD	TB	LB	Pts	Status
13	N2N	Hull Ionians	26	6	1	19	730	916	−186	11	7	44	
13	N2E	Wimbledon (R)	26	6	1	19	686	899	−213	13	5	44	Relegated
13	N2W	Newport (Salop) (R)	26	6	0	20	515	935	−420	11	4	39	Relegated
14	N2W	Dudley Kingswinford (R)	26	4	0	22	511	1021	−510	8	3	27	Relegated
14	N2N	Huddersfield (R)	26	2	1	23	574	1184	−610	11	2	23	Relegated
14	N2E	North Walsham (R)	26	1	1	24	432	1218	−786	6	0	12	Relegated

Updated to match(es) played on 27 April 2024. Source: National League 2 RFU
(R) Relegated

== Fixtures & results ==
Fixtures for the season were published by the RFU on 12 June 2023.

=== Round 1 ===
2 September 2023
15:00

(1 BP) Fylde	26 – 26	Sheffield Tigers (1 BP)

Woodlands Memorial Ground
Attendance: 620
Referee: James O'Brien

2 September 2023
15:00

(2 BP) Huddersfield	31 – 39	Hull Ionians (1 BP)

Lockwood Park
Attendance: 235
Referee: Jack Moorhouse

2 September 2023
15:00

(1 BP) Lymm	21 – 22	Wharfedlale

Crouchley Lane
Attendance: 300
Referee: Llyr ApGeraint-Roberts

2 September 2023
15:00

(1 BP) Otley	27 – 32	Hull (1 BP)

Cross Green
Attendance: 220
Referee: Daniel Woods

2 September 2023
15:00

(1 BP) Rotherham Titans	52 – 24	Billingham

Clifton Lane
Attendance: 321
Referee: David Charton

2 September 2023
15:00

(2 BP) Sheffield	35 – 40	Leeds Tykes (1 BP)

Abbeydale Park
Attendance: 200
Referee: Henry Pearson

2 September 2023
15:00

(2 BP) Tynedale	38 – 43	Preston Grasshoppers (1 BP)

Tynedale Park
Attendance: 339
Referee: Gavin Jones

=== Round 2 ===
9 September 2023
14:00

Wharfedale	19 – 34	Rotherham Titans

The Avenue
Attendance: 339
Referee: Jack Moorhouse

9 September 2023
14:15

Billingham	20 – 17	Tynedale (1 BP)

Greenwood Road
Attendance: 485
Referee: Daniel Woods

9 September 2023
14:30

Preston Grasshoppers	27 – 41	Fylde (1 BP)

Lightfoot Green
Attendance: 1,800
Referee: Ben Rayner

9 September 2023
15:00

(1 BP) Hull	25 – 30	Hull Ionians

Ferens Ground
Attendance: 450
Referee: Gavin Jones

9 September 2023
15:00

(1 BP) Leeds Tykes	31 – 18	Otley

The Sycamores
Attendance: 526
Referee: Ben Buchanan

9 September 2023
15:00

(2 BP) Lymm	41 – 48	Huddersfield (1 BP)

Crouchley Lane
Attendance: 458
Referee: James O'Brien

9 September 2023
15:00

(1 BP) Sheffield Tigers	28 – 32	Sheffield (1 BP)

Dore Moor
Attendance: 817
Referee: George Ounsley

=== Round 3 ===
16 September 2023
14:00

(1 BP) Rotherham Titans	33 – 10	Lymm

Clifton Lane
Attendance: 309
Referee: Gavin James

16 September 2023
15:00

(1 BP) Fylde	32 – 26	Billingham (2 BP)

Woodlands Memorial Ground
Attendance: 505
Referee: Peter Connor

16 September 2023
15:00

Huddersfield	12 – 49	Hull (1 BP)

Lockwood Park
Attendance: 226
Referee: Henry Pearson

16 September 2023
15:00

(1 BP) Hull Ionians	34 – 49	Leeds Tykes (1 BP)

Brantingham Park
Attendance: 308
Referee: Daniel Woods

16 September 2023
15:00

(2 BP) Otley	24 – 31	Sheffield Tigers (1 BP)

Cross Green
Attendance: 198
Referee: Dave Charlton

16 September 2023
15:00

(1 BP) Sheffield	36 – 14	Preston Grasshoppers

Abbeydale Park
Attendance: 413
Referee: Jack Moorhouse

16 September 2023
15:00

(1 BP) Tynedale	22 – 24	Wharfedale (1 BP)

Tynedale Park
Attendance: 351
Referee: George Ounsley

=== Round 4 ===
23 September 2023
14:00

(1 BP) Rotherham Titans	43 – 15	Huddersfield

Clifton Lane
Attendance: 314
Referee: Peter Connor

23 September 2023
14:00

Wharfedale	27 – 26	Fylde (2 BP)

The Avenue
Attendance: 483
Referee: Daniel Woods

23 September 2023
14:15

Billingham	16 – 14	Sheffield (1 BP)

Greenwood Road
Attendance: 313
Referee: Nathan Howarth

23 September 2023
14:30

(1 BP) Preston Grasshoppers	26 – 41	Otley (1 BP)

Lightfoot Green
Attendance: 353
Referee: Llyr ApGeraint-Roberts

23 September 2023
15:00

(1 BP) Leeds Tykes	41 – 11	Hull

The Sycamores
Attendance: 325
Referee: James O'Brien

23 September 2023
15:00

(1 BP) Lymm	33 – 26	Tynedale (2 BP)

Crouchley Lane
Attendance: 200
Referee: Henry Pearson

23 September 2023
15:00

(1 BP) Sheffield Tigers	49 – 5	Hull Ionians

Dore Moor
Attendance: 192
Referee: Gareth Jones

=== Round 5 ===
30 September 2023
14:00

Hull	24 – 18	Sheffield Tigers (1 BP)

Ferens Ground
Attendance: 245
Referee: Michael Harris

30 September 2023
14:00

(1 BP) Wharfedale	33 – 25	Sheffield

The Avenue
Attendance: 587
Referee: Gavin Jones

30 September 2023
15:00

(1 BP) Fylde	14 – 15	Lymm

Woodlands Memorial Ground
Attendance: 480
Referee: George Ounsley

30 September 2023
15:00

Huddersfield	10 – 52	Leeds Tykes (1 BP)

Lockwood Park
Attendance: 296
Referee: Peter Buchanan

30 September 2023
15:00

(1 BP) Hull Ionians	15 – 19	Preston Grasshoppers

Brantingham Park
Attendance: 223
Referee: Henry Pearson

30 September 2023
15:00

(1 BP) Otley	10 – 12	Billingham

Cross Green
Attendance: 236
Referee: Daniel Woods

30 September 2023
15:00

Tynedale	19 – 33	Rotherham Titans

Tynedale Park
Attendance: 456
Referee: Nathan Howarth

=== Round 6 ===
7 October 2023
14:00

(1 BP) Rotherham Titans	34 – 19	Fylde

Clifton Lane
Attendance: 404
Referee: Henry Pearson

7 October 2023
14:00

(1 BP) Wharfedale	31 – 7	Otley

The Avenue
Attendance: 510
Referee: Llyr ApGeraint-Roberts

7 October 2023
14:15

(1 BP) Billingham	24 – 17	Hull Ionians (1 BP)

Greenwood Road
Attendance: 347
Referee: Michael Harris

7 October 2023
14:30

(1 BP) Preston Grasshoppers	30 – 30	Hull

Lightfoot Green
Attendance: 650
Referee: Peter Buchanan

7 October 2023
15:00

Lymm	26 – 41	Sheffield (1 BP)

Crouchley Lane
Attendance: 459
Referee: Peter Connor

7 October 2023
15:00

(1 BP) Sheffield Tigers	29 – 50	Leeds Tykes (1 BP)

Dore Moor
Attendance: 237
Referee: George Oundsley

7 October 2023
15:00

(1 BP) Tynedale	33 – 18	Huddersfield

Tynedale Park
Attendance: 425
Referee: Nathan Howarth

=== Round 7 ===
14 October 2023
14:00

Huddersfield	25 – 44	Sheffield Tigers (1 BP)

Lockwood Park
Attendance: 205
Referee: James O'Brien

14 October 2023
14:00

(1 BP) Hull	40 – 24	Billingham

Ferens Ground
Attendance: 452
Referee: Daniel Woods

14 October 2023
14:00

(1 BP) Otley	45 – 34	Lymm (1 BP)

Cross Green
Attendance: 112
Referee: Gavin Jones

14 October 2023
14:15

(2 BP) Fylde	28 – 34	Tynedale (1 BP)

Woodlands Memorial Ground
Attendance: 452
Referee: Jack Moorhouse

14 October 2023
15:00

(1 BP) Hull Ionians	36 – 23	Wharfedale

Brantingham Park
Attendance: 249
Referee: David Charlton

14 October 2023
15:00

(1 BP) Leeds Tykes	53 – 21	Preston Grasshoppers

The Sycamores
Attendance: 327
Referee: Michael Harris

14 October 2023
15:00

Sheffield	17 – 37	Rotherham Titans (1 BP)

Abbeydale Park
Attendance: 397
Referee: George Ounsley

=== Round 13 (rescheduled) ===
21 October 2023
15:00

(1 BP) Leeds Tykes	30 – 17	Fylde

The Sycamores
Attendance: 220

- Game brought forward from 16 December 2023.

=== Round 8 ===
4 November 2023
14:00

(1 BP) Rotherham Titans	34 – 32	Otley (2 BP)

Clifton Lane
Attendance: 284
Referee: Daniel Woods

4 November 2023
14:00

Tynedale	19 – 19	Sheffield

Tynedale Park
Attendance: 450
Referee: Michael Harris

4 November 2023
14:00

(1 BP) Wharfedale	35 – 6	Hull

The Avenue
Attendance: 525
Referee: Jack Moorhouse

4 November 2023
14:15

Billingham	12 – 29	Leeds Tykes (1 BP)

Greenwood Road
Attendance: 567
Referee: David Charlton

4 November 2023
14:30

(2 BP) Preston Grasshoppers	39 – 41	Sheffield Tigers (1 BP)

Lightfoot Green
Attendance: 375
Referee: Llyr ApGeraint-Roberts

4 November 2023
15:00

(1 BP) Fylde	62 – 19	Huddersfield

Woodlands Memorial Ground
Attendance: 564
Referee: Henry Pearson

4 November 2023
15:00

(1 BP) Lymm	31 – 30	Hull Ionians (1 BP)

Crouchley Lane
Attendance: 339
Referee: George Ounsley

=== Round 9 ===
10 November 2023
20:00

Leeds Tykes	20 – 8	Wharfedale

The Sycamores
Attendance: 965
Referee: Llyr ApGeraint-Roberts

11 November 2023
14:00

Huddersfield	17 – 41	Preston Grasshoppers (1 BP)

Lockwood Park
Attendance: 238
Referee: Jack Moorhouse

11 November 2023
14:00

(1 BP) Hull	34 – 27	Lymm (2 BP)

Ferens Ground
Attendance: 325
Referee: Dave Charlton

11 November 2023
14:00

Hull Ionians	24 – 49	Rotherham Titans (1 BP)

Brantingham Park
Attendance: 317
Referee: Michael Harris

11 November 2023
14:00

(1 BP) Sheffield Tigers	35 – 25	Billingham

Dore Moor
Attendance: 250
Referee: Henry Pearson

11 November 2023
14:15

(1 BP) Otley	31 – 26	Tynedale (2 BP)

Cross Green
Attendance: 238
Referee: Nathan Howarth

11 November 2023
14:15

(1 BP) Sheffield	34 – 28	Fylde (2 BP)

Abbeydale Park
Attendance: 447
Referee: Daniel Woods

=== Round 10 ===
18 November 2023
14:00

Rotherham Titans	28 – 9	Hull

Clifton Lane
Attendance: 396
Referee: Peter Connor

18 November 2023
14:00

(1 BP) Tynedale	28 – 25	Hull Ionians (1 BP)

Tynedale Park
Attendance: 425
Referee: David Charlton

18 November 2023
14:00

(1 BP) Wharfedale	31 – 17	Sheffield Tigers

The Avenue
Attendance: 595
Referee: Michael Harris

18 November 2023
14:15

(1 BP) Billingham	24 – 38	Preston Grasshoppers (1 BP)

Greenwood Road
Attendance: 322
Referee: Gavin Jones

18 November 2023
14:15

(1 BP) Sheffield	71 – 18	Huddersfield

Abbeydale Park
Attendance: 350
Referee: Llyr ApGeraint-Roberts

18 November 2023
15:00

(1 BP) Fylde	41 – 18	Otley

Woodlands Memorial Ground
Attendance: 605
Referee: Jack Moorhouse

18 November 2023
15:00

Lymm	21 – 43	Leeds Tykes (1 BP)

Crouchley Lane
Attendance: 350
Referee: Henry Pearson

=== Round 11 ===
25 November 2023
14:00

Huddersfield	P – P	Billingham

Lockwood Park

- Postponed due to frozen pitch. Game to be rescheduled.

25 November 2023
14:00

Hull	10 – 34	Tynedale (1 BP)

Ferens Ground
Attendance: 265
Referee: Jack Moorhouse

25 November 2023
14:00

Hull Ionians	14 – 36	Fylde (1 BP)

Brantingham Park
Attendance: 304
Referee: Gavin Jones

25 November 2023
14:00

(1 BP) Sheffield Tigers	47 – 35	Lymm (1 BP)

Dore Moor
Attendance: 165
Referee: Mick Harris

25 November 2023
14:15

(2 BP) Otley	41 – 45	Sheffield (1 BP)

Cross Green
Attendance: 238
Referee: Dave Charlton

25 November 2023
14:30

(1 BP) Leeds Tykes	26 – 20	Rotherham Titans (1 BP)

The Sycamores
Attendance: 991
Referee: Dan Woods

25 November 2023
14:30

Preston Grasshoppers	22 – 35	Wharfedale (1 BP)

Lightfoot Green
Attendance: 302
Referee: James O'Brien

=== Round 12 ===
2 December 2023
14:00

(1 BP) Lymm	46 – 22	Preston Grasshoppers (1 BP)

Crouchley Lane
Attendance: 202

2 December 2023
14:00

Rotherham Titans	P – P	Sheffield Tigers

Clifton Lane

- Postponed due to poor weather. Game to be rescheduled for 6 January 2024.

2 December 2023
14:00

Tynedale	P – P	Leeds Tykes

Tynedale Park

- Postponed due to poor weather. Game to be rescheduled for 6 January 2024.

2 December 2023
14:00

Wharfedale	P – P	Billingham

The Avenue

- Postponed due to poor weather. Game to be rescheduled for 3 February 2024.

2 December 2023
14:15

Otley	P – P	Huddersfield

Cross Green

- Postponed due to poor weather. Game to be rescheduled for 3 February 2024.

2 December 2023
14:15

Sheffield	P – P	Hull Ionians

Abbeydale Park

- Postponed due to poor weather. Game to be rescheduled for 6 January 2024.

2 December 2023
15:00

Fylde	P – P	Hull

Woodlands Memorial Ground

- Postponed due to poor weather. Game to be rescheduled for 6 January 2024.

=== Round 13 ===
9 December 2023
14:00

Huddersfield	12 – 26	Wharfedale (1 BP)

Lockwood Park
Attendance: 239
Referee: James O'Brien

9 December 2023
14:00

Hull	15 – 33	Sheffield (1 BP)

Ferens Ground
Attendance: 438
Referee: George Ounsley

9 December 2023
14:00

(2 BP) Hull Ionians	34 – 39	Otley (1 BP)

Brantingham Park
Attendance: 310
Referee: Jack Moorhouse

9 December 2023
14:00

Sheffield Tigers	0 – 10	Tynedale

Dore Moor
Attendance: 145
Referee: Daniel Woods

9 December 2023
14:15

Billingham	25 – 25	Lymm

Greenwood Road
Attendance: 283
Referee: Mick Harris

9 December 2023
14:30

Preston Grasshoppers	7 – 34	Rotherham Titans (1 BP)

Lightfoot Green
Attendance: 306
Referee: Dave Charlton

9 December 2023
15:00

Leeds Tykes	R – R	Fylde

The Sycamores

- Rescheduled. Game brought forward to 21 October 2023.

=== Round 14 ===
16 December 2023
14:00

(1 BP) Fylde	33 – 27	Preston Grasshoppers (1 BP)

Woodlands Memorial Ground
Attendance: 1,220
Referee: Michael Harris

16 December 2023
14:00

(1 BP) Huddersfield	24 – 33	Lymm

Lockwood Park
Attendance: 240
Referee: Sam Yeates

16 December 2023
14:00

(1 BP) Hull Ionians	18 – 23	Hull

Brantingham Park
Attendance: 675
Referee: Henry Pearson

16 December 2023
14:00

(1 BP) Rotherham Titans	33 – 7	Wharfedale

Clifton Lane
Attendance: 390
Referee: Daniel Woods

16 December 2023
14:00

(1 BP) Tynedale	24 – 12	Billingham

Tynedale park
Attendance: 460
Referee: David Charlton

16 December 2023
14:15

Otley	17 – 47	Leeds Tykes (1 BP)

Cross Green
Attendance: 467
Referee: Gavin Jones

16 December 2023
14:15

(1 BP) Sheffield	33 – 24	Sheffield Tigers

Abbeydale Park
Attendance: 400
Referee: Harry Gardner

=== Round 12 (rescheduled games) ===
6 January 2024
14:00

(1 BP) Huddersfield	24 – 8	Billingham

Lockwood Park
Attendance: 196
Referee: Henry Pearson

- Game rescheduled from 2 December 2023.

6 January 2024
14:00

(1 BP) Fylde	35 – 8	Hull

Woodlands Memorial Ground
Attendance: 607
Referee: James O'Brien

- Game rescheduled from 2 December 2023.

6 January 2024
14:00

(1 BP) Rotherham Titans	35 – 17	Sheffield Tigers

Clifton Lane
Attendance: 435
Referee: George Ounsley

- Game rescheduled from 2 December 2023.

6 January 2024
14:00

Tynedale	12 – 35	Leeds Tykes (1 BP)

Tynedale Park
Attendance: 475
Referee: Gavin Jones

- Game rescheduled from 2 December 2023.

6 January 2024
14:15

(1 BP) Sheffield	40 – 10	Hull Ionians

Abbeydale Park
Attendance: 200
Referee: Daniel Woods

- Game rescheduled from 2 December 2023.

=== Round 15 ===
13 January 2024
14:00

(1 BP) Hull	60 – 26	Huddersfield (1 BP)

Ferens Ground
Attendance: 265
Referee: Daniel Woods

13 January 2024
14:00

Sheffield Tigers	24 – 16	Otley

Dore Moor
Attendance: 210
Referee: Dave Charlton

13 January 2024
14:00

Wharfedale	P – P	Tynedale

The Avenue

- Postponed in respect of Tynedale 1st XV player Rory Cramb whose funeral was being held on same date. Game to be rescheduled for 2 March 2024.

13 January 2024
14:15

Billingham	25 – 38	Fylde (1 BP)

Greenwood Road
Attendance: 353
Referee: Peter Connor

13 January 2024
14:30

(1 BP) Leeds Tykes	66 – 15	Hull Ionians

The Sycamores
Attendance: 586
Referee: George Ounsley

13 January 2024
14:30

(2 BP) Preston Grasshoppers	24 – 26	Sheffield (1 BP)

Lightfoot Green
Attendance: 300
Referee: Michael Harris

13 January 2024
15:00

Lymm	22 – 36	Rotherham Titans (1 BP)

Crouchley Lane
Attendance: 270
Referee: James O'Brien

=== Round 16 ===
20 January 2024
14:00

Huddersfield	P – P	Rotherham Titans

Lockwood Park

- Postponed due to frozen pitch. Game to be rescheduled for 2 March 2024.

20 January 2024
14:00

Hull	P – P	Leeds Tykes

Ferens Ground

- Postponed due to frozen pitch. Game to be rescheduled for 3 February 2024.

20 January 2024
14:00

Hull Ionians	P – P	Sheffield Tigers

Brantingham Park

- Postponed due to frozen pitch. Game to be rescheduled for 3 February 2024.

20 January 2024
14:00

(1 BP) Tynedale	36 – 18	Lymm

Tynedale Park
Attendance: 550
Referee: Nathan Howarth

20 January 2024
14:15

Otley	P – P	Preston Grasshoppers

Cross Green

- Postponed due to frozen pitch. Game to be rescheduled for 2 March 2024.

20 January 2024
14:15

(1 BP) Sheffield	26 – 13	Billingham

Abbeydale Park
Attendance: 380
Referee: Daniel Woods

20 January 2024
15:00

Fylde	7 – 24	Wharfedale

Woodlands Memorial Ground
Attendance: 915
Referee: Jack Moorhouse

=== Round 17 ===
27 January 2024
14:00

(1 BP) Rotherham Titans	42 – 7	Tynedale

Clifton Lane
Attendance: 398
Referee: Sam Yates

27 January 2024
14:00

(1 BP) Sheffield Tigers	36 – 17	Hull

Dore Moor
Attendance: 225
Referee: Daniel Woods

27 January 2024
14:15

(1 BP) Billingham	29 – 40	Otley (1 BP)

Greenwood Road
Attendance: 399
Referee: George Ounsley

27 January 2024
14:15

(1 BP) Sheffield	31 – 14	Wharfedale

Abbeydale Park
Attendance: 216
Referee: Gavin Jones

27 January 2024
14:30

(1 BP) Leeds Tykes	57 – 17	Huddersfield

The Sycamores
Attendance: 372
Referee: Dave Charlton

27 January 2024
14:30

(1 BP) Preston Grasshoppers	44 – 35	Hull Ionians (1 BP)

Lightfoot Green
Attendance: 208
Referee: Henry Pearson

27 January 2024
15:00

(1 BP) Lymm	28 – 50	Fylde (1 BP)

Crouchley Lane
Attendance: 311
Referee: James O'Brien

=== Rounds 12 & 16 (rescheduled games) ===
3 February 2024
14:00

Hull	22 – 58	Leeds Tykes (1 BP)

Ferens Ground
Attendance: 175
Referee: Henry Pearson

- Game rescheduled from 20 January 2024.

3 February 2024
14:00

(1 BP) Hull Ionians	25 – 26	Sheffield Tigers

Brantingham Park
Attendance: 121
Referee: Peter Connor

- Game rescheduled from 20 January 2024.

3 February 2024
14:00

(1 BP) Wharfedale	31 – 7	Billingham

The Avenue
Attendance: 468
Referee: Dave Charlton

- Game rescheduled from 2 December 2023.

3 February 2024
14:15

(1 BP) Otley	48 – 28	Huddersfield (1 BP)

Cross Green
Attendance: 221
Referee: Michael Harris

- Game rescheduled from 2 December 2023.

=== Round 18 ===
10 February 2024
14:00

Huddersfield	19 – 57	Tynedale (1 BP)

Lockwood Park
Attendance: 202
Referee: James O'Brien

10 February 2024
14:00

(1 BP) Hull	40 – 33	Preston Grasshoppers (2 BP)

Ferens Ground
Attendance: 125
Referee: Jack Moorhouse

10 February 2024
14:00

(1 BP) Hull Ionians	38 – 38	Billingham (1 BP)

Brantingham Park
Attendance: 316
Referee: Gavin Jones

10 February 2024
14:15

Otley	0 – 41	Wharfedale (1 BP)

Cross Green
Attendance: 529
Referee: Nathan Howarth

10 February 2024
14:15

(1 BP) Sheffield	28 – 24	Lymm (1 BP)

Abbeydale Park
Attendance: 235
Referee: Henry Pearson

10 February 2024
14:30

(1 BP) Fylde	27 – 32	Rotherham Titans (1 BP)

Woodlands Memorial Ground
Attendance: 495
Referee: George Ounsley

10 February 2024
14:30

(1 BP) Leeds Tykes	49 – 6	Sheffield Tigers

The Sycamores
Attendance: 248
Referee: Michael Harris

=== Round 19 ===
17 February 2024
14:00

(1 BP) Rotherham Titans	32 – 14	Sheffield

Clifton Lane
Attendance: 253
Referee: Jack Moorhouse

17 February 2024
14:00

(1 BP) Sheffield Tigers	34 – 32	Huddersfield (2 BP)

Dore Moor
Attendance: 216
Referee: Gareth Jones

17 February 2024
14:00

(1 BP) Tynedale	45 – 22	Fylde (1 BP)

Tynedale Park
Attendance: 450
Referee: Nikki O'Donnell

17 February 2024
14:00

(1 BP) Wharfedale	39 – 19	Hull Ionians

The Avenue
Attendance: 398
Referee: Dan Woods

17 February 2024
14:15

(1 BP) Billingham	24 – 30	Hull (1 BP)

Greenwood Road
Attendance: 358
Referee: Dave Charlton

17 February 2024
14:30

Preston Grasshoppers	14 –48	Leeds Tykes (1 BP)

Lightfoot Green
Attendance: 276
Referee: George Ounsley

17 February 2024
15:00

Lymm	15 – 14	Otley (1 BP)

Crouchley Lane
Attendance: 176
Referee: Michael Harris

=== Round 20 ===
24 February 2024
14:00

(2 BP) Huddersfield	32 – 34	Fylde (1 BP)

Lockwood Park
Attendance: 198
Referee: Jack Moorhouse

24 February 2024
14:00

Hull	21 – 10	Wharfedale

Ferens Ground
Attendance: 225
Referee: Peter Buchanan

24 February 2024
14:00

(1 BP) Hull Ionians	31 – 19	Lymm

Brantingham Park
Attendance: 356
Referee: Michael Harris

24 February 2024
14:00

(1 BP) Sheffield Tigers	32 – 26	Preston Grasshoppers (2 BP)

Dore Moor
Attendance: 150
Referee: Henry Pearson

24 February 2024
14:15

Otley	13 – 34	Rotherham Titans (1 BP)

Cross Green
Attendance: 339
Referee: Gavin Jones

24 February 2024
14:15

(1 BP) Sheffield	27 – 19	Tynedale

Abbeydale Park
Attendance: 350
Referee: George Ounsley

24 February 2024
14:30

(1 BP) Leeds Tykes	57 – 13	Billingham

The Sycamores
Attendance: 316
Referee: Daniel Woods

=== Rounds 15 & 16 (rescheduled games) ===
2 March 2024
14:00

Huddersfield	12 – 31	Rotherham Titans (1 BP)

Lockwood Park
Attendance: 242
Referee: James O'Brien

- Game rescheduled from 20 January 2024.

2 March 2024
14:00

Wharfedale	18 – 17	Tynedale (1 BP)

The Avenue
Attendance: 381
Referee: Henry Pearson

- Game rescheduled from 13 January 2024.

2 March 2024
14:15

(1 BP) Otley	41 – 12	Preston Grasshoppers

Cross Green
Attendance: 172
Referee: Dave Charlton

- Game rescheduled from 20 January 2024.

=== Round 21 ===
9 March 2024
14:00

(1 BP) Rotherham Titans	42 – 17	Hull Ionians

Clifton Lane
Attendance: 317
Referee: Peter Connor

9 March 2024
14:00

(1 BP) Wharfedale	8 – 12	Leeds Tykes

The Avenue
Attendance: 486
Referee: Michael Harris

9 March 2024
14:15

(1 BP) Billingham	30 – 19	Sheffield Tigers

Greenwood Road
Attendance: 309
Referee: Nathan Howarth

9 March 2024
14:30

(1 BP) Preston Grasshoppers	70 – 19	Huddersfield

Lightfoot Green
Attendance: 207
Referee: George Ounsley

9 March 2024
15:00

Fylde	23 – 22	Sheffield (1 BP)

Woodlands Memorial Ground
Attendance: 468
Referee: James O'Brien

9 March 2024
15:00

Lymm	28 – 22	Hull (1 BP)

Crouchley Lane
Attendance: 130
Referee: Henry Pearson

9 March 2024
15:00

(1 BP) Tynedale	26 – 22	Otley (1 BP)

Tynedale Park
Attendance: 470
Referee: David Charlton

=== Round 22 ===
16 March 2024
14:00

(1 BP) Hull	29 – 47	Rotherham Titans (1 BP)

Ferens Ground
Attendance: 342
Referee: Michael Harris

16 March 2024
14:15

(1 BP) Otley	46 – 22	Fylde (1 BP)

Cross Green
Attendance: 234
Referee: George Ounsley

16 March 2024
14:30

Preston Grasshoppers	26 – 22	Billingham (1 BP)

Lightfoot Green
Attendance: 327
Referee: James O'Brien

16 March 2024
15:00

Huddersfield	15 – 34	Sheffield (1 BP)

Lockwood Park
Attendance: 186
Referee: Peter Connor

16 March 2024
15:00

(1 BP) Hull Ionians	26 – 36	Tynedale (1 BP)

Brantingham Park
Attendance: 181
Referee: Henry Pearson

16 March 2024
15:00

(1 BP) Leeds Tykes	78 – 17	Lymm

The Sycamores
Attendance: 539
Referee: David Charlton

16 March 2024
15:00

Sheffield Tigers	20 – 18	Wharfedale (1 BP)

Dore Moor
Attendance: 245
Referee: Nicola O'Donnell

=== Round 23 ===
23 March 2024
14:00

(1 BP) Rotherham Titans	32 – 26	Leeds Tykes (2 BP)

Clifton Lane
Attendance: 1,141
Referee: Ben Simpson

23 March 2024
14:00

(1 BP) Wharfedale	31 – 21	Preston Grasshoppers

The Avenue
Attendance: 387
Referee: Michael Harris

23 March 2024
14:15

(1 BP) Billingham	53 – 29	Huddersfield (1 BP)

Greenwood Road
Attendance: 498
Referee: David Charlton

- Huddersfield are relegated.

23 March 2024
15:00

(1 BP) Fylde	45 – 17	Hull Ionians

Woodlands Memorial Ground
Attendance: 1,195
Referee: Peter Connor

23 March 2024
15:00

(1 BP) Lymm	43 – 24	Sheffield Tigers (1 BP)

Crouchley Lane
Attendance: 249
Referee: Jack Moorhouse

23 March 2024
15:00

Sheffield	21 – 15	Otley (1 BP)

Abbeydale Park
Attendance: 219
Referee: George Ansley

23 March 2024
15:00

(2 BP) Tynedale	34 – 36	Hull (1 BP)

Tynedale Park
Attendance: 480
Referee: Nikki O'Donnell

=== Round 24 ===
6 April 2024
14:00

(1 BP) Hull	39 – 36	Fylde (2 BP)

Ferens Ground
Attendance: 256
Referee: David Charlton

6 April 2024
14:15

Billingham	20 – 17	Wharfedale (1 BP)

Greenwood Road
Attendance: 491
Referee: Jack Moorhouse

6 April 2024
14:30

(1 BP) Preston Grasshoppers	46 – 42	Lymm (2 BP)

Lightfoot Green
Attendance: 372
Referee: Peter Connor

6 April 2024
15:00

(1 BP) Huddersfield	26 – 26	Otley (1 BP)

Lockwood Park
Attendance: 224
Referee: Sam Yates

6 April 2024
15:00

(1 BP) Hull Ionians	48 – 14	Sheffield

Brantingham Park
Attendance: 212
Referee: Nicola O'Donnell

6 April 2024
15:00

(1 BP) Leeds Tykes	55 – 14	Tynedale

The Sycamores
Attendance: 392
Referee: Daniel Woods

6 April 2024
15:00

Sheffield Tigers	P – P	Rotherham Titans

Dore Moor

- Postponed as due to waterlogged pitch. Game to be rescheduled for 20 April 2024.

=== Round 25 ===
13 April 2024
14:00

(1 BP) Rotherham Titans	67 – 20	Preston Grasshoppers

Clifton Lane
Attendance: 525
Referee: Michael Harris

13 April 2024
14:00

(1 BP) Wharfedale	40 – 17	Huddersfield

The Avenue
Attendance: 395
Referee: Peter Connor

13 April 2024
15:00

Fylde	18 – 15	Leeds Tykes (1 BP)

Woodlands Memorial Ground
Attendance: 812
Referee: Daniel Woods

13 April 2024
15:00

(1 BP) Lymm	39 – 24	Billingham (1 BP)

Crouchley Lane
Attendance: 250
Referee: George Ounsley

13 April 2024
15:00

(1 BP) Otley	55 – 34	Hull Ionians (1 BP)

Cross Green
Attendance: 271
Referee: Jack Moorhouse

13 April 2024
15:00

(1 BP) Sheffield	39 – 14	Hull

Abbeydale Park
Attendance: 238
Referee: Gavin Jones

13 April 2024
15:00

(1 BP) Tynedale	36 – 27	Sheffield Tigers

Tynedale Park
Attendance: 530
Referee: Dave Charlton

=== Round 24 (rescheduled game) ===
20 April 2024
15:00

Sheffield Tigers	14 – 36	Rotherham Titans (1 BP)

Dore Moor
Attendance: 510
Referee: Daniel Woods

- Game rescheduled from 6 April 2024.

=== Round 26 ===
27 April 2024
14:15

(1 BP) Billingham	26 – 40	Rotherham Titans (1 BP)

Greenwood Road
Attendance: 1,002
Referee: Henry Pearson

- Rotherham Titans are champions.

27 April 2024
15:00

(1 BP) Hull	37 – 36	Otley (2 BP)

Ferens Ground
Attendance: 325
Referee: Nikki O'Donnell

27 April 2024
15:00

(1 BP) Hull Ionians	94 – 26	Huddersfield (1 BP)

Brantingham Park
Attendance: 411
Referee: Dave Charlton

27 April 2024
15:00

(1 BP) Leeds Tykes	47 – 42	Sheffield (2 BP)

The Sycamores
Attendance: 546
Referee: Jack Moorhouse

27 April 2024
15:00

(2 BP) Preston Grasshoppers	35 – 36	Tynedale (1 BP)

Lightfoot Green
Attendance: 376
Referee: Sam Yates

27 April 2024
15:00

Sheffield Tigers	21 – 15	Fylde (1 BP)

Door More
Attendance: 193
Referee: George Ounsley

27 April 2024
15:00

(1 BP) Wharfedale	59 – 31	Lymm (1 BP)

The Avenue
Attendance: 509
Referee: Daniel Woods

== Attendances ==
Club	Home games	Total	Average	Highest	Lowest	% Capacity
Billingham	13	5,727	441	1,002	283	29%
Fylde	13	8,938	688	1,220	452	9%
Huddersfield	13	2,927	225	296	186	15%
Hull	13	3,888	299	452	125	20%
Hull Ionians	13	3,983	306	675	121	20%
Leeds Tykes	13	6,353	489	991	220	33%
Lymm	13	3,694	284	459	130	28%
Otley	13	3,475	267	529	112	4%
Preston Grasshoppers	13	5,852	450	1,800	207	20%
Rotherham Titans	13	5,487	422	1,141	253	17%
Sheffield	13	4,045	311	447	200	9%
Sheffield Tigers	13	3,555	273	817	145	27%
Tynedale	13	5,861	451	550	339	23%
Wharfedale	13	6,063	466	595	339	23%

== Individual statistics ==
=== Top points scorers ===
Rank	Player	Team	Points
1	Richard Hayes	Rotherham Titans	327
2	Lewis Minikin	Hull Ionians	287
3	Reece Dean	Hull	277
4	Elliot Fisher	Sheffield	272
5	Gregory Smith	Fylde	218
6	Thomas Shard	Lymm	216
7	William Hunt	Preston Grasshoppers	180
8	Kieran Davies	Leeds Tykes	161
9	Robert Davidson	Wharfedale	155

=== Top try scorers ===
Rank	Player	Team	Tries
1	Samuel Taylor	Otley	24
2	Eliot Fisher	Sheffield	21
2	Benjamin Gregory	Fylde	21
3	Christian Hooper	Leeds Tykes	20
4	Henry MacNab	Leeds Tykes	19
5	Ryan Burrows	Sheffield	17
6	Lewis Minikin	Hull Ionians	16
6	Tyler Spence	Preston Grasshoppers	16
7	Harry Jukes	Leeds Tykes	15

== See also ==
- 2023–24 National League 1
- 2023–24 National League 2 East
- 2023–24 National League 2 West
