= 2023–24 National League 2 East =

Rugby union competition in England

- Countries: England; Guernsey
- Date: 2 September 2023 – 27 April 2024
- Champions: Esher (1st title)
- Runners-up: Barnes
- Relegated: North Walsham, Wimbledon
- Matches played: 182
- Attendance: 65,969 (average 362 per match)
- Highest attendance: 1,415 – Esher v Dorking, 13 April 2024
- Lowest attendance: 41 – Wimbledon v Old Albanian, 10 February 2024
- Tries scored: 1583 (average 8.7 per match)
- Top point scorer: 283 – Frank Reynolds (Canterbury)
- Top try scorer: 36 – James Botterill (Esher)

The 2023–24 National League 2 East was the second season of the fourth-tier (east) of the English domestic rugby union competitions; one of three at this level. The others are National League 2 North and National League 2 West.

Esher were crowned champions on 13 April with two games still to play following a home win over Dorking, booking a quick return to 2024–25 National League 1 after a gap of just one season. In the end it was fairly comfortable with Esher who could even afford to lose to runners up Barnes on the last day of the season.

North Walsham were the first side to be relegated, going down with five games remaining following an away defeat to Canterbury on 9 March. It was a miserable season for the Norfolk club, who would achieve just one victory all season. The second relegation spot was much more keenly fought, particularly as one 13th place team in National 2 could stay up, and went down to the last day of the season. In the end Wimbledon would go down, a losing bonus point away to Dorking not enough to keep them in the league, finishing 3 points below 12th place Worthing Raiders and also missing out on being the best ranked 13th placed side to 2023–24 National League 2 North side Hull Ionians by the narrowest of margins (points for against).

Out of the two relegated sides North Walsham would drop to Regional 1 South East while Wimbledon would go into Regional 1 South Central. For Wimbledon it would be an instant return to tier 5, while for North Walsham a gap of two seasons.

== Structure ==
The league consists of fourteen teams who play the others on a home and away basis, to make a total of 26 matches each. The champions are promoted to National League 1 and the bottom two teams are relegated to Regional 1 South Central or Regional 1 South East, depending on their location.

Due to the liquidation of RFU Championship side Jersey Reds in September 2023 and the knock on effect on the league system, the best placed 13th placed side in the three National 2 leagues (National League 2 North, National League 2 East, National 2 West) will be saved from relegation. See Relegation (13th placed teams).

The results of the matches contribute points to the league as follows:

- 4 points are awarded for a win
- 2 points are awarded for a draw
- 0 points are awarded for a loss, however
- 1 losing (bonus) point is awarded to a team that loses a match by 7 points or fewer
- 1 additional (bonus) point is awarded to a team scoring 4 tries or more in a match.

=== Participating teams and locations ===
Locations of the 2023–24 National League 2 East teams
Locations of the 2023–24 National League 2 East teams in London

Team	Ground	Capacity	City/Area	Previous season
Barnes	Barn Elms	1,000	Barnes, London	2nd
Bury St Edmunds	The Haberden	3,000 (135 seats)	Bury St Edmunds, Suffolk	5th
Canterbury	Marine Travel Ground	1,500 (75 seats)	Canterbury, Kent	10th
Dorking	The Big Field	1,500	Dorking, Surrey	3rd
Esher	Molesey Road	3,500	Hersham, Surrey	Relegated from National League 1 (12th)
Guernsey Raiders	Footes Lane	5,000 (720 seats)	Saint Peter Port, Guernsey	9th
Henley Hawks	Dry Leas	4,000	Henley-on-Thames, Oxfordshire	6th
North Walsham	Norwich Road	1,600	Scottow, Norfolk	12th
Old Albanian	Woollam's Playing Fields	1,000	St Albans, Hertfordshire	7th
Sevenoaks	Knole Paddock	1,000	Sevenoaks, Kent	11th
Tonbridge Juddians	The Slade (Note: Due to adverse weather, Tonbridge Juddians would also play several home games at their training ground, Vizards 3G, located at The Judd School.)	1,500	Tonbridge, Kent	8th
Westcombe Park	Goddington Dene	3,200 (200 seats)	Orpington, London	Promoted from Regional 1 South East (1st)
Wimbledon	Beverley Meads	1,000	Wimbledon, London	Promoted from Regional 1 South Central (1st)
Worthing Raiders	Roundstone Lane	1,500 (100 seats)	Angmering, West Sussex	4th

== League table ==
2023–24 National League 2 East table
Pos	Team	Pld	W	D	L	PF	PA	PD	TB	LB	Pts	Result
1	Esher (C)	26	22	0	4	1108	598	+510	21	4	113	Promoted
2	Barnes	26	21	0	5	883	631	+252	18	4	106	
3	Dorking	26	19	1	6	971	676	+295	23	3	104	
4	Henley Hawks	26	16	2	8	784	680	+104	19	2	89	
5	Tonbridge Juddians	26	14	1	11	844	714	+130	20	7	85	
6	Bury St Edmunds	26	14	1	11	813	653	+160	17	6	81	
7	Canterbury	26	13	0	13	808	736	+72	16	5	73	
8	Old Albanian	26	12	0	14	802	828	−26	17	4	69	
9	Westcombe Park	26	10	2	14	735	741	−6	16	9	69	
10	Guernsey Raiders	26	11	0	15	685	856	−171	16	2	62	
11	Sevenoaks	26	11	1	14	605	724	−119	10	4	60	
12	Worthing Raiders	26	7	0	19	761	963	−202	18	5	51	
13	Wimbledon (R)	26	6	1	19	686	899	−213	13	5	44	Relegated
14	North Walsham (R)	26	1	1	24	432	1218	−786	6	0	12	Relegated

Updated to match(es) played on 27 April 2024. Source: National League 2 East RFU
Rules for classification: If teams are level at any stage, tiebreakers are applied in the following order:
1. Number of matches won
2. Difference between points for and against
3. Total number of points for
4. Aggregate number of points scored in matches between tied teams
5. Number of matches won excluding the first match, then the second and so on until the tie is settled
  (C) Champion; (R) Relegated

=== Relegation (13th placed teams) ===
National League 2 relegation
Pos	Grp	Team	Pld	W	D	L	PF	PA	PD	TB	LB	Pts	Status
13	N2N	Hull Ionians	26	6	1	19	730	916	−186	11	7	44	
13	N2E	Wimbledon (R)	26	6	1	19	686	899	−213	13	5	44	Relegated
13	N2W	Newport (Salop) (R)	26	6	0	20	515	935	−420	11	4	39	Relegated
14	N2W	Dudley Kingswinford (R)	26	4	0	22	511	1021	−510	8	3	27	Relegated
14	N2N	Huddersfield (R)	26	2	1	23	574	1184	−610	11	2	23	Relegated
14	N2E	North Walsham (R)	26	1	1	24	432	1218	−786	6	0	12	Relegated

Updated to match(es) played on 27 April 2024. Source: National League 2 RFU
(R) Relegated

== Fixtures & results ==
Fixtures for the season were published by the RFU on 12 June, 2023.

=== Round 1 ===
2 September 2023
15:00

Bury St Edmunds	21 – 20	Old Albanian (1 BP)

The Haberden
Attendance: 651
Referee: Ben Woods

2 September 2023
15:00

(2 BP) Esher	38 – 39	Barnes (1 BP)

Molesey Road
Attendance: 211
Referee: Jack Sutton

2 September 2023
15:00

(1 BP) Henley Hawks	43 – 33	Guernsey Raiders (1 BP)

Dry Leas
Attendance: 233
Referee: James Dowds

2 September 2023
15:00

North Walsham	7 – 45	Worthing Raiders (1 BP)

Norwich Road
Attendance: 476
Referee: Peter Connor

2 September 2023
15:00

Sevenoaks	23 – 22	Canterbury (1 BP)

Knole Paddock
Attendance: 420
Referee: Alex Rose

2 September 2023
15:00

Tonbridge Juddians	26 – 20	Westcombe Park (1 BP)

The Slade
Attendance: 274
Referee: Holly Wood

2 September 2023
15:00

(1 BP) Wimbledon	22 – 57	Dorking (1 BP)

Beverley Meads
Attendance: 210
Referee: Harry Gardner

=== Round 2 ===
9 September 2023
14:00

(1 BP) Guernsey Raiders	36 – 27	Sevenoaks

Footes Lane
Attendance: 478
Referee: Simon Waite

9 September 2023
15:00

(1 BP) Barnes	59 – 22	Wimbledon

Barn Elms
Attendance: 350
Referee: Alex Rose

9 September 2023
15:00

(1 BP) Bury St Edmunds	50 – 17	North Walsham

The Harberden
Attendance: 375
Referee: Jack Sutton

9 September 2023
15:00

(1 BP) Canterbury	45 – 19	Tonbridge Juddians

Marine Travel Ground
Attendance: 340
Referee: Daniel Collins

9 September 2023
15:00

(1 BP) Dorking	38 – 10	Worthing Raiders

The Big Field
Attendance: 600
Referee: Philip Russell

9 September 2023
15:00

(1 BP) Old Albanian	31 – 20	Henley Hawks

Woollam's Playing Fields
Attendance: 225
Referee: Holly Wood

9 September 2023
15:00

Westcombe Park	27 – 42	Esher (1 BP)

Goddington Dene
Attendance: 250
Referee: Tom Bird

=== Round 3 ===
16 September 2023
14:30

(1 BP) Tonbridge Juddians	36 – 25	Guernsey Raiders (1 BP)

The Slade
Attendance: 123
Referee: Peter Caunt

16 September 2023
15:00

(1 BP) Esher	29 – 21	Canterbury

Molesey Road
Attendance: 478
Referee: Holly Wood

16 September 2023
15:00

(1 BP) Henley Hawks	37 – 21	Bury St Edmunds

Dry Leas
Attendance: 347
Referee: Tom Bird

16 September 2023
15:00

North Walsham	14 – 59	Dorking (1 BP)

Norwich Road
Attendance: 417
Referee: Conor Boyle

16 September 2023
15:00

Sevenoaks	16 – 51	Old Albanian (1 BP)

Knole Paddock
Attendance: 350
Referee: Jack Sutton

16 September 2023
15:00

(1 BP) Wimbledon	47 – 41	Westcombe Park (2 BP)

Beverley Meads
Attendance: 150
Referee: Simon Waite

16 September 2023
15:00

(1 BP) Worthing Raiders	28 – 51	Barnes (1 BP)

Roundstone Lane
Attendance: 396
Referee: Michael Lamb

=== Round 4 ===
23 September 2023
14:00

(1 BP) Guernsey Raiders	14 – 19	Esher

Footes Lane
Attendance: 311
Referee: Philip Russell

23 September 2023
15:00

(2 BP) Barnes	29 – 31	Dorking (1 BP)

Barn Elms
Attendance: 250
Referee: George Ounsley

23 September 2023
15:00

(1 BP) Bury St Edmunds	52 – 16	Sevenoaks

The Haberden
Attendance: 327
Referee: Michael Lamb

23 September 2023
15:00

(2 BP) Canterbury	29 – 32	Wimbledon (1 BP)

Marine Travel Ground
Attendance: 300
Referee: Peter Caunt

23 September 2023
15:00

(1 BP) Henley Hawks	41 – 14	North Walsham

Dry Leas
Attendance: 223
Referee: James Dowds

23 September 2023
15:00

Old Albanian	21 – 39	Tonbridge Juddians (1 BP)

Woollam's Playing Fields
Attendance: 543
Referee: Jamie Parr

23 September 2023
15:00

(1 BP) Westcombe Park	31 – 21	Worthing Raiders

Goddington Dene
Attendance: 200
Referee: Jack Sutton

=== Round 5 ===
30 September 2023
14:30

(1 BP) Wimbledon	22 – 34	Guernsey Raiders (1 BP)

Beverley Meads
Attendance: 133
Referee: Jack Sutton

30 September 2023
15:00

(1 BP) Dorking	55 – 21	Westcombe Park

The Big Field
Attendance: 450
Referee: Philip Russell

30 September 2023
15:00

(1 BP) Esher	50 – 27	Old Albanian (1 BP)

Molesey Road
Attendance: 300
Referee: Simon Waite

30 September 2023
15:00

North Walsham	0 – 36	Barnes (1 BP)

Norwich Road
Attendance: 180
Referee: Conor Boyle

30 September 2023
15:00

Sevenoaks	13 – 34	Henley Hawks (1 BP)

Knole Paddock
Attendance: 300
Referee: Neil Sweeney

30 September 2023
15:00

Tonbridge Juddians	26 – 17	Bury St Edmunds

The Slade
Attendance: 247
Referee: Alex Rose

30 September 2023
15:00

(2 BP) Worthing Raiders	38 – 45	Canterbury (1 BP)

Roundstone Lane
Attendance: 301
Referee: Michael Lamb

=== Round 6 ===
7 October 2023
14:00

(1 BP) Guernsey Raiders	41 – 17	Worthing Raiders

Footes Lane
Attendance: 421
Referee: Connor Boyle

7 October 2023
15:00

Bury St Edmunds	22 – 17	Esher (1 BP)

The Haberden
Attendance: 613
Referee: Philip Russell

7 October 2023
15:00

(2 BP) Canterbury	31 – 36	Dorking (1 BP)

Marine Travel Ground
Attendance: 342
Referee: Simon Waite

7 October 2023
15:00

Henley Hawks	27 – 26	Tonbridge Juddians (1 BP)

Dry Leas
Attendance: 225
Referee: Jack Sutton

7 October 2023
15:00

(1 BP) Old Albanian	48 – 29	Wimbledon (1 BP)

Woollam's Playing Fields
Attendance: 255
Referee: Jamie Dowds

7 October 2023
15:00

(1 BP) Sevenoaks	43 – 15	North Walsham

Knole Paddock
Attendance: 339
Referee: Tom Bird

7 October 2023
15:00

(1 BP) Westcombe Park	33 – 48	Barnes (1 BP)

Goddington Dene
Attendance: 220
Referee: Peter Gaunt

=== Round 7 ===
14 October 2023
14:30

(1 BP) Dorking	59 – 14	Guernsey Raiders

The Big Field
Attendance: 325
Referee: Tom Bird

14 October 2023
15:00

(1 BP) Barnes	39 – 22	Canterbury

Barn Elms
Attendance: 192
Referee: Jack Sutton

14 October 2023
15:00

(1 BP) Esher	46 – 25	Henley Hawks (1 BP)

Moseley Road
Attendance: 412
Referee: Peter Caunt

14 October 2023
15:00

North Walsham	7 – 59	Westcombe Park (1 BP)

Norwich Road
Attendance: 409
Referee: Michael Lamb

14 October 2023
15:00

(1 BP) Tonbridge Juddians	29 – 29	Sevenoaks (1 BP)

The Slade
Attendance: 467
Referee: Philip Russell

14 October 2023
15:00

(1 BP) Wimbledon	31 – 45	Bury St Edmunds (1 BP)

Beverley Meads
Attendance: 146
Referee: Simon Waite

14 October 2023
15:00

(1 BP) Worthing Raiders	46 – 36	Old Albanian (1 BP)

Roundstone Lane
Attendance: 450
Referee: Alex Rose

=== Round 8 ===
4 November 2023
14:00

Guernsey Raiders	11 – 28	Barnes

Footes Lane
Attendance: 850
Referee: Conor Boyle

4 November 2023
14:30

(1 BP) Sevenoaks	18 – 22	Esher

Knole Paddock
Attendance: 320
Referee: Alex Rose

4 November 2023
15:00

(1 BP) Bury St Edmunds	49 – 12	Worthing Raiders

The Haberden
Attendance: 375
Referee: Tom Bird

4 November 2023
14:30

Tonbridge Juddians	P – P	North Walsham

The Slade

- Postponed due to waterlogged pitch caused by heavy rain. Game to be rescheduled to 6 January 2024.

4 November 2023
15:00

Canterbury	25 – 19	Westcombe Park (1 BP)

Marine Travel Ground
Attendance: 320
Referee: Michael Lamb

4 November 2023
15:00

Old Albanian	10 – 23	Dorking

Woollam's Playing Fields
Attendance: 255
Referee: Holly Wood

4 November 2023
15:30

Henley Hawks	23 – 19	Wimbledon (1 BP)

Dry Leas
Attendance: 272
Referee: Philip Russell

=== Round 9 ===
11 November 2023
14:00

(1 BP) Barnes	36 – 30	Old Albanian (2 BP)

Barn Elms
Attendance: 250
Referee: Alex Rose

11 November 2023
14:00

(1 BP) Worthing Raiders	23 – 29	Henley Hawks

Roundstone Lane
Attendance: 483
Referee: Jack Sutton

11 November 2023
14:30

(2 BP) Dorking	22 – 23	Bury St Edmunds

The Big Field
Attendance: 545
Referee: Peter Caunt

11 November 2023
14:30

(1 BP) Westcombe Park	25 – 19	Guernsey Raiders (1 BP)

Goddington Dene
Attendance: 250
Referee: Philip Russell

11 November 2023
14:30

Wimbledon	19 – 27	Sevenoaks

Beverley Mead
Attendance: 148
Referee: Conor Boyle

11 November 2023
15:00

(1 BP) Esher	48 – 31	Tonbridge Juddians (1 BP)

Molesey Road
Attendance: 550
Referee: Tom Bird

11 November 2023
15:00

North Walsham	10 – 54	Canterbury (1 BP)

Norwich Road
Attendance: 463
Referee: Simon Waite

=== Round 10 ===
18 November 2023
14:30

Sevenoaks	15 – 10	Worthing Raiders (1 BP)

Knole Paddock
Attendance: 301
Referee: Philip Russell

18 November 2023
14:30

Tonbridge Juddians	19 – 12	Wimbledon (1 BP)

The Slade
Attendance: 211
Referee: Tom Bird

18 November 2023
15:00

Bury St Edmunds	25 – 22	Barnes (1 BP)

The Harberden
Attendance: 597
Referee: Conor Boyle

18 November 2023
15:00

(1 BP) Esher	59 – 7	North Walsham

Molesey Road
Attendance: 454
Referee: Jack Sutton

18 November 2023
15:00

Guernsey Raiders	10 – 34	Canterbury (1 BP)

Footes Lane
Attendance: 610
Referee: Alex Rose

18 November 2023
15:00

Henley Hawks	18 – 18	Dorking

Dry Leas
Attendance: 406
Referee: Simon Waite

18 November 2023
15:00

Old Albanian	24 – 20	Westcombe Park (1 BP)

Woollam's Playing Fields
Attendance: 255
Referee: Peter Caunt

=== Round 11 ===
25 November 2023
14:00

(1 BP) Barnes	22 – 27	Henley Hawks (1 BP)

Barn Elms
Attendance: 197
Referee: Neil Sweeney

25 November 2023
14:00

North Walsham	14 – 22	Guernsey Raiders

Norwich Road
Attendance: 410
Referee: Jack Sutton

25 November 2023
14:00

(1 BP) Westcombe Park	34 – 34	Bury St Edmunds (1 BP)

Goddington Dene
Attendance: 275
Referee: Simon Waite

25 November 2023
14:00

Wimbledon	14 – 34	Esher (1 BP)

Beverley Meads
Attendance: 310
Referee: Philip Russell

25 November 2023
14:00

(1 BP) Worthing Raiders	33 – 43	Tonbridge Juddians (1 BP)

Roundstone Lane
Attendance: 375
Referee: Conor Boyle

25 November 2023
14:30

(1 BP) Dorking	41 – 38	Sevenoaks (2 BP)

The Big Field
Attendance: 850
Referee: Alex Rose

25 November 2023
15:00

(1 BP) Canterbury	32 – 27	Old Albanian (1 BP)

Marine Travel Ground
Attendance: 450
Referee: Tom Bird

=== Round 12 ===
2 December 2023
14:00

Old Albanian	P – P	Guernsey Raiders

Woollams Playing Fields

- Postponed due to poor weather. Game to be rescheduled for 3 February 2024.

2 December 2023
14:00

Sevenoaks	P – P	Barnes

Knole Paddock

- Postponed due to poor weather. Game to be rescheduled for 6 January 2024.

2 December 2023
14:00

Wimbledon	P – P	North Walsham

Beverley Meads

- Postponed due to poor weather. Game to be rescheduled for 3 February 2024.

2 December 2023
14:30

(1 BP) Tonbridge Juddians	36 – 45	Dorking (1 BP)

The Slade
Attendance: 152
Referee: Connor Boyle

2 December 2023
15:00

Bury St Edmunds	P – P	Canterbury

The Haberden

- Postponed due to poor weather. Game to be rescheduled for 6 January 2024.

2 December 2023
15:00

(1 BP) Esher	62 – 20	Worthing Raiders (1 BP)

Molesey Road
Attendance: 419
Referee: Henry Pearson

2 December 2023
15:00

Henley Hawks	P – P	Westcombe Park

Dry Leas

- Postponed due to poor weather. Game to be rescheduled for 6 January 2024.

=== Round 13 ===
8 December 2023
19:30

Guernsey Raiders	10 – 40	Bury St Edmunds (1 BP)

Footes Lane
Attendance: 364
Referee: Jack Sutton

9 December 2023
14:00

Barnes	16 – 12	Tonbridge Juddians (1 BP)

Barn Elms
Attendance: 133
Referee: Simon Waite

9 December 2023
14:00

Dorking	19 – 38	Esher (1 BP)

The Big Field
Attendance: 750
Referee: Philip Russell

9 December 2023
14:00

(1 BP) Westcombe Park	22 – 20	Sevenoaks (1 BP)

Goddington Dene
Attendance: 310
Referee: Michael Lamb

9 December 2023
14:00

(1 BP) Worthing Raiders	51 – 33	Wimbledon (1 BP)

Roundstone Lane
Attendance: 430
Referee: Holly Wood

9 December 2023
15:00

(1 BP) Canterbury	33 – 43	Henley Hawks (1 BP)

The Marine Travel Ground
Attendance: 450
Referee: Peter Caunt

9 December 2023
15:00

North Walsham	8 – 35	Old Albanian (1 BP)

Norwich Road
Attendance: 289
Referee: Alex Rose

=== Round 14 ===
16 December 2023
14:00

Sevenoaks	27 – 17	Guernsey Raiders

Knole Paddock
Attendance: 490
Referee: Tom Bird

16 December 2023
14:00

(2 BP) Wimbledon	20 – 21	Barnes

Beverley Meads
Attendance: 184
Referee: Alex Powdrell

16 December 2023
14:00

Worthing Raiders	18 – 29	Dorking (1 BP)

Roundstone Lane
Attendance: 496
Referee: Jack Sutton

16 December 2023
14:30

(2 BP) Tonbridge Juddians	24 – 28	Canterbury

The Slade
Attendance: 267
Referee: Conor Boyle

16 December 2023
15:00

(1 BP) Esher	43 – 36	Westcombe Park (1 BP)

Molesey Road
Attendance: 311
Referee: Alex Rose

16 December 2023
15:00

(2 BP) Henley Hawks	24 – 27	Old Albanian

Dry Leas
Attendance: 260
Referee: Peter Buchanan

16 December 2023
15:00

North Walsham	5 – 45	Bury St Edmunds (1 BP)

Norwich Road
Attendance: 345
Referee: Simon Waite

=== Rounds 8 & 12 (rescheduled games) ===
6 January 2024
14:00

(1 BP) Sevenoaks	31 – 27	Barnes (1 BP)

Knole Paddock
Attendance: 450
Referee: Philip Russell

- Game rescheduled from 2 December 2023.

6 January 2024
14:30

(1 BP) Tonbridge Juddians	59 – 12	North Walsham

Vizards 3G, The Judd School (Note: Tonbridge Juddians moved their home game versus North Walsham on 6 January 2024 to their training ground Vizards 3G at The Judd School due to a waterlogged pitch at The Slade.)
Attendance: 50
Referee: Peter Caunt

- Game rescheduled from 4 November 2023.

6 January 2024
15:00

(1 BP) Bury St Edmunds	33 – 14	Canterbury

The Haberden
Attendance: 551
Referee: Jack Sutton

- Game rescheduled from 2 December 2023.

6 January 2024
15:00

(1 BP) Henley Hawks	43 – 26	Westcombe Park (1 BP)

Dry Leas
Attendance: 211
Referee: Tom Bird

- Game rescheduled from 2 December 2023.

=== Round 15 ===
13 January 2024
13:30

(1 BP) Guernsey Raiders	29 – 24	Tonbridge Juddians (2 BP)

Footes Lane
Attendance: 378
Referee: Tom Bird

13 January 2024
14:00

(1 BP) Barnes	49 – 26	Worthing Raiders (1 BP)

Barn Elms
Attendance: 151
Referee: Alex Rose

13 January 2024
14:00

(1 BP) Dorking	59 – 33	North Walsham (1 BP)

The Big Field
Attendance: 325
Referee: Conor Boyle

13 January 2024
14:00

(1 BP) Westcombe Park	17 – 21	Wimbledon

Goddington Dene
Attendance: 180
Referee: Jackie Sutton

13 January 2024
15:00

(1 BP) Bury St Edmunds	26 – 14	Henley Hawks

The Haberden
Attendance: 743
Referee: Philip Russell

13 January 2024
15:00

(2 BP) Canterbury	34 – 36	Esher (1 BP)

The Marine Travel Ground
Attendance: 370
Referee: Alex Powdrell

13 January 2024
15:00

(1 BP) Old Albanian	32 – 27	Sevenoaks (2 BP)

Woollam's Playing Fields
Attendance: 265
Referee: Simon Waite

=== Round 16 ===
20 January 2024
14:00

Sevenoaks	P – P	Bury St Edmunds

Knole Paddock

- Postponed due to frozen pitch. Game to be rescheduled for 3 February 2024.

20 January 2024
14:00

(1 BP) Wimbledon	36 – 52	Canterbury (1 BP)

Beverley Meads
Attendance: 200
Referee: Simon Waite

20 January 2024
14:00

Worthing Raiders	P – P	Westcombe Park

Roundstone Lane

- Postponed due to frozen pitch. Game to be rescheduled for 3 February 2024.

20 January 2024
14:30

Esher	P – P	Guernsey Raiders

Molesey Road

- Postponed due to frozen pitch. Game to be rescheduled for 20 April 2024.

20 January 2024
14:30

(1 BP) Tonbridge Juddians	34 – 20	Old Albanian

Vizards 3G, The Judd School (Note: Tonbridge Juddians moved their home game versus Old Albanian on 20 January 2024 to their training ground Vizards 3G at The Judd School due to a frozen pitch at The Slade.)
Attendance: 127
Referee: Peter Caunt

20 January 2024
15:00

North Walsham	P – P	Henley Hawks

Norwich Road

- Postponed due to frozen pitch. Game to be rescheduled for 2 March 2024.

20 January 2024
16:00

(2 BP) Dorking	33 – 38	Barnes (1 BP)

The Big Field
Attendance: 340
Referee: Philip Russell

=== Round 17 ===
27 January 2024
14:00

(1 BP) Barnes	42 – 24	North Walsham (1 BP)

Barn Elms
Attendance: 225
Referee: Tom Bird

27 January 2024
14:00

(1 BP) Westcombe Park	39 – 31	Dorking (1 BP)

Goddington Dene
Attendance: 150
Referee: Peter Caunt

27 January 2024
15:00

(1 BP) Bury St Edmunds	27 – 36	Tonbridge Juddians (1 BP)

The Haberden
Attendance: 405
Referee: Alex Rose

27 January 2024
15:00

(1 BP) Canterbury	36 – 33	Worthing Raiders (2 BP)

The Marine Travel Ground
Attendance: 340
Referee: Jack Sutton

27 January 2024
15:00

(1 BP) Guernsey Raiders	49 – 21	Wimbledon

Footes Lane
Attendance: 316
Referee: Philip Russell

27 January 2024
15:00

(1 BP) Henley Hawks	36 – 17	Sevenoaks

Dry Leas
Attendance: 326
Referee: Simon Waite

27 January 2024
15:00

Old Albanian	17 – 59	Esher (1 BP)

Woollam's Playing Fields
Attendance: 198
Referee: Conor Boyle

=== Rounds 12 & 16 (rescheduled games) ===
3 February 2024
14:00

(1 BP) Old Albanian	26 – 36	Guernsey Raiders (1 BP)

Woollam's Playing Fields
Attendance: 197
Referee: Simon Waite

- Game rescheduled from 2 December 2023.

3 February 2024
14:00

Sevenoaks	22 – 21	Bury St Edmunds (1 BP)

Knole Paddock
Attendance: 330
Referee: Jack Sutton

- Game rescheduled from 20 January 2024.

3 February 2024
14:00

Wimbledon	23 – 23	North Walsham

Beverley Meads
Attendance: 110
Referee: Neil Sweeney

- Game rescheduled from 2 December 2023.

3 February 2024
14:00

(1 BP) Worthing Raiders	29 – 26	Westcombe Park (2 BP)

Roundstone Lane
Attendance: 267
Referee: Philip Russell

- Game rescheduled from 20 January 2024.

=== Round 18 ===
10 February 2024
14:00

Barnes	23 – 19	Westcombe Park (1 BP)

Barn Elm
Attendance: 73
Referee: Simon Waite

10 February 2024
14:00

(2 BP) Worthing Raiders	28 – 31	Guernsey Raiders (1 BP)

Roundstone Lane
Attendance: 410
Referee: Alex Powdrell

10 February 2024
14:30

(1 BP) Dorking	42 – 22	Canterbury

The Big Field
Attendance: 450
Referee: Conor Boyle

10 February 2024
14:30

(1 BP) Tonbridge Juddians	35 – 26	Henley Hawks (1 BP)

The Slade
Attendance: 124
Referee: Peter Caunt

10 February 2024
14:30

(2 BP) Wimbledon	26 – 28	Old Albanian (1 BP)

Beverley Meads
Attendance: 41
Referee: Alex Rose

10 February 2024
15:00

(1 BP) Esher	60 – 15	Bury St Edmunds

Molesey Road
Attendance: 303
Referee: Jack Sutton

10 February 2024
15:00

North Walsham	19 – 35	Sevenoaks (1 BP)

Norwich Road
Attendance: 390
Referee: Philip Russell

=== Round 19 ===
17 February 2024
14:00

(1 BP) Westcombe Park	47 – 39	North Walsham (2 BP)

Goddington Dene
Attendance: 120
Referee: Jack Sutton

17 February 2024
14:30

Sevenoaks	24 – 22	Tonbridge Juddians (1 BP)

Knole Paddock
Attendance: 845
Referee: Simon Waite

17 February 2024
15:00

(2 BP) Bury St Edmunds	27 – 31	Wimbledon (1 BP)

The Haberden
Attendance: 508
Referee: Holly Wood

17 February 2024
15:00

Canterbury	20 – 29	Barnes (1 BP)

The Marine Travel Ground
Attendance: 479
Referee: Peter Buchanan

17 February 2024
15:00

Guernsey Raiders	12 – 36	Dorking (1 BP)

Footes Lane
Attendance: 633
Referee: Alex Rose

17 February 2024
15:00

(2 BP) Henley Hawks	26 – 31	Esher (1 BP)

Dry Leas
Attendance: 405
Referee: Conor Boyle

17 February 2024
15:00

(1 BP) Old Albanian	39 – 26	Worthing Raiders (1 BP)

Woollam's Playing Fields
Attendance: 219
Referee: Peter Caunt

=== Round 20 ===
24 February 2024
14:00

(1 BP) Barnes	36 – 21	Guernsey Raiders

Barn Elms
Attendance: 176
Referee: Jack Sutton

24 February 2024
14:00

(1 BP) Westcombe Park	27 – 14	Canterbury

Goddington Dene
Attendance: 140
Referee: Philip Russell

24 February 2024
14:00

(1 BP) Worthing Raiders	32 – 31	Bury St Edmunds (2 BP)

Roundstone Lane
Attendance: 333
Referee: Alex Rose

24 February 2024
14:30

(1 BP) Dorking	50 – 24	Old Albanian (1 BP)

The Big Field
Attendance: 485
Referee: Holly Wood

24 February 2024
14:30

Wimbledon	22 – 32	Henley Hawks (1 BP)

Beverley Meads
Attendance: 200
Referee: Nicola O'Donnell

24 February 2024
15:00

(1 BP) Esher	41 – 31	Sevenoaks (1 BP)

Molesey Road
Attendance: 503
Referee: Alex Powdrell

24 February 2024
15:00

North Walsham	17 – 45	Tonbridge Juddians (1 BP)

Norwich Road
Attendance: 309
Referee: Conor Boyle

=== Round 16 (rescheduled game) ===
2 March 2024
15:00

(1 BP) North Walsham	35 – 26	Henley Hawks (1 BP)

Norwich Road
Attendance: 373
Referee: Alex Rose

- Game rescheduled from 20 January 2024.

=== Round 21 ===
9 March 2024
15:00

(2 BP) Bury St Edmunds	29 – 33	Dorking (1 BP)

The Haberden
Attendance: 711
Referee: Simon Waite

9 March 2024
15:00

(1 BP) Canterbury	41 – 12	North Walsham

The Marine Travel Ground
Attendance: 431
Referee: Peter Caunt

- North Walsham are relegated

9 March 2024
15:00

(1 BP) Guernsey Raiders	33 – 14	Westcombe Park

Footes Lane
Attendance: 803
Referee: Conor Boyle

9 March 2024
15:00

Henley Hawks	29 – 19	Worthing Raiders

Dry Leas
Attendance: 236
Referee: Ben Simpson

9 March 2024
15:00

Old Albanian	20 – 32	Barnes (1 BP)

Woollam's Playing Fields
Attendance: 215
Referee: Nicola O'Donnell

9 March 2024
15:00

(1 BP) Sevenoaks	22 – 13	Wimbledon

Knole Paddock
Attendance: 350
Referee: Mike Lamb

9 March 2024
15:00

(1 BP) Tonbridge Juddians	24 – 20	Esher (1 BP)

The Slade
Attendance: 237
Referee: Philip Russell

=== Round 22 ===
16 March 2024
14:00

(1 BP) Barnes	47 – 34	Bury St Edmunds (1 BP)

Barn Elms
Attendance: 153
Referee: Holly Wood

16 March 2024
14:00

(1 BP) Canterbury	33 – 19	Guernsey Raiders

The Marine Travel Ground
Attendance: 400
Referee: Philip Russell

16 March 2024
14:00

(1 BP) Westcombe Park	33 – 26	Old Albanian (2 BP)

Goddington Dene
Attendance: 110
Referee: Callum Watson

16 March 2024
15:00

(1 BP) Dorking	39 – 27	Henley Hawks (1 BP)

The Big Field
Attendance: 470
Referee: Haydn Davies

16 March 2024
15:00

North Walsham	12 – 48	Esher (1 BP)

Norwich Road
Attendance: 337
Referee: Alex Powdrell

16 March 2024
15:00

Wimbledon	21 – 36	Tonbridge Juddians (1 BP)

Beverley Meads
Attendance: 130
Referee: Jack Sutton

16 March 2024
15:00

(1 BP) Worthing Raiders	40 – 28	Sevenoaks (1 BP)

Roundstone Lane
Attendance: 350
Referee: Peter Buchanan

=== Round 23 ===
23 March 2024
15:00

Bury St Edmunds	19 – 14	Westcombe Park (1 BP)

The Haberden
Attendance: 393
Referee: Alex Powdrell

23 March 2024
15:00

(1 BP) Esher	62 – 19	Wimbledon

Molesey Road
Attendance: 918
Referee: Philip Russell

23 March 2024
15:00

(1 BP) Guernsey Raiders	41 – 28	North Walsham (1 BP)

Footes Lane
Attendance: 421
Referee: Jack Sutton

23 March 2024
15:00

(1 BP) Henley Hawks	39 – 26	Barnes (1 BP)

Dry Leas
Attendance: 354
Referee: Conor Boyle

23 March 2024
15:00

(1 BP) Old Albanian	38 – 23	Canterbury

Woollam's Playing Fields
Attendance: 219
Referee: Nathan Howarth

23 March 2024
15:00

(1 BP) Sevenoaks	28 – 26	Dorking (2 BP)

Knole Paddock
Attendance: 430
Referee: Adam Wookey

23 March 2024
15:00

(1 BP) Tonbridge Juddians	61 – 31	Worthing Raiders (1 BP)

The Slade
Attendance: 223
Referee: Simon Waite

=== Round 24 ===
6 April 2024
15:00

Barnes	19 – 5	Sevenoaks

Barn Elms
Attendance: 412
Referee: Michael Lamb

6 April 2024
15:00

(1 BP) Canterbury	29 – 25	Bury St Edmunds (2 BP)

The Marine Travel Ground
Attendance: 400
Referee: Jack Sutton

6 April 2024
15:00

(1 BP) Dorking	36 – 33	Tonbridge Juddians (2 BP)

The Big Field
Attendance: 520
Referee: Philip Russell

6 April 2024
15:00

(1 BP) Guernsey Raiders	53 – 41	Old Albanian (1 BP)

Footes Lane
Attendance: 658
Referee: Alex Powdrell

6 April 2024
15:00

North Walsham	7 – 57	Wimbledon (1 BP)

Norwich Road
Attendance: 359
Referee: Simon Waite

6 April 2024
15:00

Westcombe Park	19 – 19	Henley Hawks

Goddington Dene
Attendance: 170
Referee: Peter Caunt

6 April 2024
15:00

(1 BP) Worthing Raiders	22 – 50	Esher (1 BP)

Roundstone Lane
Attendance: 290
Referee: Alex Rose

=== Round 25 ===
13 April 2024
13:30

(1 BP) Bury St Edmunds	56 – 24	Guernsey Raiders (1 BP)

The Haberden
Attendance: 635
Referee: Peter Caunt

13 April 2024
15:00

(1 BP) Esher	50 – 28	Dorking (1 BP)

Molesey Road
Attendance: 1,415
Referee: Michael Lamb

- Esher are champions.

13 April 2024
15:00

(1 BP) Henley Hawks	36 – 35	Canterbury (2 BP)

Dry Leas
Attendance: 433
Referee: Jack Sutton

13 April 2024
15:00

(1 BP) Old Albanian	76 – 34	North Walsham (1 BP)

Woollams Playing Fields
Attendance: 412
Referee: Conor Boyle

13 April 2024
15:00

Sevenoaks	0 – 24	Westcombe Park

Knole Paddock
Attendance: 339
Referee: Philip Russell

13 April 2024
15:00

(2 BP) Tonbridge Juddians	36 – 43	Barnes (1 BP)

The Slade
Attendance: 295
Referee: Simon Waite

13 April 2024
15:00

(1 BP) Wimbledon	55 – 32	Worthing Raiders (1 BP)

Beverley Meads
Attendance: 343
Referee: Alex Rose

=== Round 16 (rescheduled game) ===
20 April 2024
14:30

(1 BP) Esher	80 – 24	Guernsey Raiders (1 BP)

Molesey Road
Attendance: 800
Referee: Alex Jones

- Game rescheduled from 20 January 2024.

=== Round 26 ===
27 April 2024
15:00

(1 BP) Barnes	26 – 24	Esher (2 BP)

Barn Elms
Attendance: 427
Referee: Jack Sutton

27 April 2024
15:00

(1 BP) Canterbury	34 – 21	Sevenoaks

The Marine Travel Ground
Attendance: 417
Referee: Rebecca Piddlestone

27 April 2024
15:00

(1 BP) Dorking	26 – 19	Wimbledon (1 BP)

The Big Field
Attendance: 585
Referee: Michael Lamb

- Wimbledon are relegated.

27 April 2024
15:00

(1 BP) Guernsey Raiders	24 – 42	Henley Hawks (1 BP)

Footes Lane
Attendance: 426
Referee: Alex Powdrell

27 April 2024
15:00

(1 BP) Old Albanian	28 – 26	Bury St Edmunds (2 BP)

Woollams Playing Fields
Attendance: 321
Referee: Harry Parsons

27 April 2024
15:00

(1 BP) Westcombe Park	42 – 33	Tonbridge Juddians (1 BP)

Goddington Dene
Attendance: 500
Referee: Conor Boyle

27 April 2024
15:00

(1 BP) Worthing Raiders	71 – 19	North Walsham

Roundstone Lane
Attendance: 530
Referee: Peter Buchanan

== Attendances ==
Club	Home games	Total	Average	Highest	Lowest	% Capacity
Barnes	13	2,989	230	427	73	23%
Bury St Edmunds	13	6,884	530	743	327	18%
Canterbury	13	5,039	388	479	300	26%
Dorking	13	6,695	515	850	325	34%
Esher	13	7,074	544	1,415	211	16%
Guernsey Raiders	13	6,669	513	850	311	10%
Henley Hawks	13	3,931	302	433	211	8%
North Walsham	13	4,757	366	476	180	23%
Old Albanian	13	3,579	275	543	197	28%
Sevenoaks	13	5,264	405	845	300	40%
Tonbridge Juddians	13	2,797	215	467	50	16%
Westcombe Park	13	2,875	221	500	110	7%
Wimbledon	13	2,305	177	343	41	18%
Worthing Raiders	13	5,111	393	530	267	26%

== Individual statistics ==
=== Top points scorers ===
Rank	Player	Team	Points
1	Frank Reynolds	Canterbury	283
2	Sam Morley	Esher	248
3	Benjamin Adams	Sevenoaks	232
4	Henry Anscombe	Dorking	222
5	Sam Jones	Old Albanian	214
6	Ciaran Mcgann	Guernsey Raiders	213
7	Edward Morgan	Wimbledon	189
8	James Botterill	Esher	180
9	Benjamin Penfold	Bury St Edmunds	165

=== Top try scorers ===
Rank	Player	Team	Tries
1	James Botterill	Esher	36
2	Tobermory McRae	Dorking	31
3	William Holling	Tonbridge Juddians	24
4	Ciaran Mcgann	Guernsey Raiders	20
4	Tomasz Posniak	Wimbledon	20
5	Barney Stone	Seveonaks	19
6	Toby Wallace	Westcombe Park	17
7	Thomas Howe	Dorking	15
7	Nathan Morris	Canterbury	15

== See also ==
- 2023–24 National League 1
- 2023–24 National League 2 North
- 2023–24 National League 2 West
