= 2023–24 National League 2 West =

Rugby union competition in England

- Countries: England
- Date: 2 September 2023 – 27 April 2024
- Champions: Dings Crusaders (1st title)
- Relegated: Dudley Kingswinford, Newport (Salop)
- Matches played: 182
- Attendance: 76,052 (average 418 per match)
- Highest attendance: 2,850 – Redruth v Camborne, 16 December 2023
- Lowest attendance: 67 – Exeter University v Camborne, 6 April 2024
- Tries scored: 1534 (average 8.4 per match)
- Top point scorer: 155 – Ben Priddey (Camborne)
- Top try scorer: 31 – Ben Priddey (Camborne)

The 2023–24 National League 2 West is the second season of the fourth-tier (west) of the English domestic rugby union competitions; one of three at this level. The others are National League 2 East and National League 2 North. The champions are promoted to National League 1 and the bottom two teams are relegated to either Regional 1 Midlands or Regional 1 South West, depending on their location.

Dings Crusaders were crowned champions on 13 April 2024 with a game still left to play, following their resounding win over Redruth. Runners up Luctonians had set the pace for much of the season but a defeat against Dings at home on 24 February 2024 would see a turn in fortunes, and in the end Dings would finish 7 points clear.

On 13 April 2024 both Dudley Kingswinford and Newport (Salop) were relegated, as it was mathematically impossible for either to stay up following their results, even as the best placed 13th placed side in the National 2 leagues (see Structure section below). Despite relegation Newport (Salop) finished the season much stronger and ended 11 points clear of bottom club Dudley Kingswinford, albeit 19 points adrift of 12th Hornets. Dudley would drop down to Regional 1 Midlands - making an instant return to the league they won the previous year, while Newport would be relegated to Regional 1 North West - returning to level 5 after an absence of two seasons.

== Structure ==
The league consists of fourteen teams who play the others on a home and away basis, to make a total of 26 matches each. The champions are promoted to National League 1 and typically the bottom two teams are relegated to either Regional 1 Midlands or Regional 1 South West depending on the location of the teams.

Due to the liquidation of RFU Championship side Jersey Reds in September 2023 and the knock on effect on the league system, the best placed 13th placed side in the three National 2 leagues (National League 2 North, National League 2 East, National 2 West) will be saved from relegation. See Relegation (13th placed teams).

The results of the matches contribute points to the league as follows:

- 4 points are awarded for a win
- 2 points are awarded for a draw
- 0 points are awarded for a loss, however
- 1 losing (bonus) point is awarded to a team that loses a match by 7 points or fewer
- 1 additional (bonus) point is awarded to a team scoring 4 tries or more in a match.

=== Participating teams and locations ===
Locations of the 2023–24 National League 2 West teams

Team	Ground	Capacity	City/Area	Previous season
Bournville	Avery Fields		Edgbaston, Birmingham, West Midlands	11th
Camborne	Recreation Ground	7,000 (780 seats)	Camborne, Cornwall	Promoted from Regional 1 South West (1st)
Chester	Hare Lane	2,000 (500 seats)	Chester, Cheshire	Transferred from National League 2 North (7th)
Clifton	Station Road	2,200 (200 seats)	Cribbs Causeway, Patchway, Bristol	3rd
Dings Crusaders	Shaftesbury Park	2,250 (250 seats)	Frenchay, Bristol	2nd
Dudley Kingswinford	Heathbrook	2,260 (260 seats)	Kingswinford, Dudley, West Midlands	Promoted from Regional 1 Midlands (1st)
Exeter University	Topsham Sports Ground		Exeter, Devon	9th
Hinckley	De Montfort Park	2,000	Hinckley, Leicestershire	5th
Hornets	The Nest, Hutton Moor Park	1,100 (100 stand)	Weston-super-Mare, Somerset	12th
Loughborough Students	East Park (Note: Since relegation from the 2018–19 National League 1 Loughborough Students have switched games from the Loughborough University Stadium to nearby East Park.)	1,000	Loughborough, Leicestershire	6th
Luctonians	Mortimer Park	2,500 (300 seats)	Kingsland, Herefordshire	4th
Newport (Salop)	The Old Showground		Newport, Shropshire	10th
Old Redcliffians	Scotland Lane	1,000	Brislington, Bristol	8th
Redruth	Recreation Ground	3,500 (580 seats)	Redruth, Cornwall	7th

== League table ==
2023–24 National League 2 West table
Pos	Team	Pld	W	D	L	PF	PA	PD	TB	LB	Pts	Result
1	Dings Crusaders (C)	26	22	1	3	1007	382	+625	18	3	111	Promoted
2	Luctonians	26	20	0	6	859	443	+416	20	4	104	
3	Clifton	26	15	2	9	802	610	+192	17	8	89	
4	Old Redcliffians	26	16	0	10	769	659	+110	18	3	85	
5	Exeter University	26	15	0	11	816	778	+38	16	5	81	
6	Camborne	26	13	1	12	796	904	−108	19	3	76	
7	Hinckley	26	13	2	11	730	732	−2	15	4	75	
8	Loughborough Students	26	12	0	14	972	839	+133	22	2	72	
9	Redruth	26	11	4	11	598	743	−145	12	2	66	
10	Bournville	26	10	0	16	647	765	−118	15	7	62	
11	Chester	26	11	0	15	696	814	−118	15	1	60	
12	Hornets	26	8	2	16	713	806	−93	13	9	58	
13	Newport (Salop) (R)	26	6	0	20	515	935	−420	11	4	39	Relegated
14	Dudley Kingswinford (R)	26	4	0	22	511	1021	−510	8	3	27	Relegated

Updated to match(es) played on 27 April 2024. Source: National League 2 West RFU
Rules for classification: If teams are level at any stage, tiebreakers are applied in the following order:
1. Number of matches won
2. Difference between points for and against
3. Total number of points for
4. Aggregate number of points scored in matches between tied teams
5. Number of matches won excluding the first match, then the second and so on until the tie is settled
  (C) Champion; (R) Relegated

=== Relegation (13th placed teams) ===
National League 2 relegation
Pos	Grp	Team	Pld	W	D	L	PF	PA	PD	TB	LB	Pts	Status
13	N2N	Hull Ionians	26	6	1	19	730	916	−186	11	7	44	
13	N2E	Wimbledon (R)	26	6	1	19	686	899	−213	13	5	44	Relegated
13	N2W	Newport (Salop) (R)	26	6	0	20	515	935	−420	11	4	39	Relegated
14	N2W	Dudley Kingswinford (R)	26	4	0	22	511	1021	−510	8	3	27	Relegated
14	N2N	Huddersfield (R)	26	2	1	23	574	1184	−610	11	2	23	Relegated
14	N2E	North Walsham (R)	26	1	1	24	432	1218	−786	6	0	12	Relegated

Updated to match(es) played on 27 April 2024. Source: National League 2 RFU
(R) Relegated

== Fixtures & results ==
Fixtures for the season were published by the RFU on 12 June, 2023.

=== Round 1 ===
2 September 2023
15:00

Camborne	17 – 27	Dings Crusaders

Recreation Ground
Attendance: 520
Referee: Callum Watson

2 September 2023
15:00

(1 BP) Chester	32 – 43	Exeter University (1 BP)

Hare Lane
Attendance: 250
Referee: Rob Howorth

2 September 2023
15:00

Clifton	19 – 10	Newport (Salop)

Station Road
Attendance: 135
Referee: James Milliner-Woodcock

2 September 2023
15:00

Dudley Kingswinford	21 – 31	Luctonians (1 BP)

Heathbrook
Attendance: 202
Referee: Haydyn Davies

2 September 2023
15:00

(1 BP) Hinckley	45 – 28	Bournville

De Montfort Park
Attendance: 202
Referee: Jamie Parr

2 September 2023
15:00

(1 BP) Hornets	43 – 36	Loughborough Students (1 BP)

The Nest
Attendance: 285
Referee: Tom Evans-Jones

2 September 2023
15:00

(1 BP) Redruth	28 – 21	Old Redcliffians (1 BP)

Recreation Ground
Attendance: 545
Referee: Ben Simpson

=== Round 2 ===
8 September 2023
19:45

(1 BP) Dings Crusaders	15 – 16	Clifton

Shaftesbury Park
Attendance: 1,012
Referee: Ben Wood

9 September 2023
15:00

(1 BP) Camborne	36 – 29	Redruth (2 BP)

Recreation Ground
Attendance: 2,678
Referee: Henry Pearson

9 September 2023
14:00

(1 BP) Loughborough Students	31 – 40	Hinckley (1 BP)

East Park
Attendance: 257
Referee: James Dowds

9 September 2023
14:15

(2 BP) Newport (Salop)	29 – 32	Chester (1 BP)

The Old Showground
Attendance: 374
Referee: Peter Connor

9 September 2023
14:30

(1 BP) Bournville	29 – 22	Dudley Kingswinford (2 BP)

Avery Fields
Attendance: 800
Referee: Nathan Howarth

9 September 2023
14:30

(1 BP) Exeter University	68 – 19	Hornets

Topsham Sports Ground
Attendance: 376
Referee: James Milliner-Woodcock

9 September 2023
15:00

(1 BP) Luctonians	31 – 40	Old Redcliffians (1 BP)

Mortimer Park
Attendance: 453
Referee: Dan Parrott

=== Round 3 ===
16 September 2023
14:00

Dudley Kingswinford	7 – 46	Loughborough Students (1 BP)

Heathbrook
Attendance: 415
Referee: Benjamin Simpson

16 September 2023
14:30

(1 BP) Hornets	55 – 12	Newport (Salop)

The Nest
Attendance: 339
Referee: James Doyds

16 September 2023
14:30

(1 BP) Clifton	39 – 31	Camborne (1 BP)

Station Road
Attendance: 232
Referee: Dan Parrott

16 September 2023
15:00

Chester	17 – 14	Dings Crusaders (1 BP)

Hare Lane
Attendance: 300
Referee: James O'Brien

16 September 2023
15:00

(1 BP) Hinckley	24 – 43	Exeter University (1 BP)

De Montfort Park
Attendance: 400
Referee: Neil Sweeney

16 September 2023
15:00

Old Redcliffians	22 – 18	Bournville (1 BP)

Scotland Lane
Attendance: 180
Referee: James Milliner-Woodcock

16 September 2023
15:00

Redruth	18 – 45	Luctonians

Recreation Ground
Attendance: 625
Referee: Lloyd Davies

=== Round 4 ===
23 September 2023
14:00

(1 BP) Camborne	34 – 26	Chester (1 BP)

Recreation Ground
Attendance: 557
Referee: James Milliner-Woodcock

23 September 2023
14:00

(1 BP) Loughborough Students	24 – 45	Old Redcliffians (1 BP)

East Park
Attendance: 202
Referee: Benjamin Wood

23 September 2023
14:15

(1 BP) Newport (Salop)	22 – 21	Hinckley (1 BP)

The Old Showground
Attendance: 220
Referee: Timothy Allatt

23 September 2023
14:30

(1 BP) Bournville	29 – 38	Luctonians (1 BP)

Avery Fields
Attendance: 350
Referee: Benjamin Simpson

23 September 2023
14:30

(1 BP) Clifton	31 – 31	Redruth (1 BP)

Station Road
Attendance: 189
Referee: Tom Evans-Jones

23 September 2023
14:30

(1 BP) Exeter University	52 – 34	Dudley Kingswinford (1 BP)

Topsham Sports Ground
Attendance: 103
Referee: Haydn Davies

23 September 2023
15:00

Dings Crusaders	19 – 5	Hornets

Shaftesbury Park
Attendance: 773
Referee: Peter Buchanan

=== Round 5 ===
30 September 2023
14:00

(1 BP) Dudley Kingswinford	32 – 19	Newport (Salop)

Heathbrook
Attendance: 450
Referee: Benjamin Simpson

30 September 2023
14:30

(2 BP) Hornets	42 – 47	Camborne (1 BP)

The Nest
Attendance: 432
Referee: James Milliner-Woodcock

30 September 2023
15:00

Chester	17 – 16	Clifton (1 BP)

Hare Lane
Attendance: 200
Referee: Peter Connor

30 September 2023
15:00

(1 BP) Hinckley	29 – 26	Dings Crusaders (2 BP)

De Montfort Park
Attendance: 450
Referee: Lloyd Davies

30 September 2023
15:00

(1 BP) Luctonians	62 – 17	Loughborough Students

Mortimer Park
Attendance: 547
Referee: Dan Parrott

30 September 2023
15:00

Old Redcliffians	7 – 17	Exeter University

Scotland Lane
Attendance: 70
Referee: Old Redcliffians

30 September 2023
15:00

Redruth	28 – 26	Bournville (2 BP)

Recreation Ground
Attendance: 687
Referee: Jamie Dowds

=== Round 6 ===
7 October 2023
14:00

(1 BP) Camborne	38 – 29	Hinckley (1 BP)

Recreation Ground
Attendance: 627
Referee: Ben Simpson

7 October 2023
14:00

(1 BP) Chester	38 – 20	Redruth

Hare Lane
Attendance: 250
Referee: Jack Moorhouse

7 October 2023
14:00

(1 BP) Loughborough Students	31 – 27	Bournville (2 BP)

East Park
Attendance: 312
Referee: Holly Wood

7 October 2023
14:15

Newport (Salop)	5 – 33	Old Redcliffians (1 BP)

The Old Showground
Attendance: 325
Referee: Dan Parrott

7 October 2023
14:30

(1 BP) Clifton	45 – 41	Hornets (2 BP)

Station Road
Attendance: 290
Referee: Lloyd Davies

7 October 2023
14:30

Exeter University	21 – 33	Luctonians (1 BP)

Topsham Sports Ground
Attendance: 282
Referee: James Milliner-Woodcock

7 October 2023
15:00

(1 BP) Dings Crusaders	43 – 21	Dudley Kingswinford

Shaftesbury Park
Attendance: 544
Referee: Callum Watson

=== Round 7 ===
14 October 2023
14:00

Dudley Kingswinford	14 – 31	Camborne (1 BP)

Heathbrook
Attendance: 110
Referee: Nathan Howarth

14 October 2023
14:00

(1 BP) Redruth	40 – 31	Loughborough Students (1 BP)

Recreation Ground
Attendance: 583
Referee: James Milliner-Woodcock

14 October 2023
14:30

(1 BP) Bournville	34 – 31	Exeter University (2 BP)

Avery Fields
Attendance: 339
Referee: Callum Watson

14 October 2023
15:00

Hinckley	14 – 49	Clifton (1 BP)

De Montfort Park
Attendance: 400
Referee: Benjamin Wood

14 October 2023
15:00

Hornets	21 – 48	Chester (1 BP)

The Nest
Attendance: 345
Referee: Benjamin Simpson

14 October 2023
15:00

(1 BP) Luctonians	39 – 5	Newport (Salop)

Mortimer Park
Attendance: 398
Referee: James Dowds

14 October 2023
15:00

(2 BP) Old Redcliffians	29 – 32	Dings Crusaders (1 BP)

Scotland Lane
Attendance: 303
Referee: Neil Sweeney

=== Round 8 ===
4 November 2023
14:00

(1 BP) Camborne	45 – 26	Old Redcliffians (1 BP)

Recreation Ground
Attendance: 645
Referee: Nathan Howarth

4 November 2023
14:00

(1 BP) Exeter University	40 – 31	Loughborough Students (1 BP)

Topsham Sports Ground
Attendance: 157
Referee: Benjamin Woods

4 November 2023
14:15

(1 BP) Newport (Salop)	32 – 16	Bournville

The Old Showground
Attendance: 250
Referee: Callum Watson

4 November 2023
14:30

(1 BP) Clifton	45 – 7	Dudley Kingswinford

Station Road
Attendance: 162
Referee: Dan Parrott

4 November 2023
14:30

(2 BP) Hornets	36 – 38	Redruth (1 BP)

The Nest
Attendance: 493
Referee: Tom Evans-Jones

4 November 2023
15:00

Chester	10 – 22	Hinckley

Hare Lane
Attendance: 250
Referee: James O'Brien

4 November 2023
15:00

Dings Crusaders	17 – 15	Luctonians (1 BP)

Shaftesbury Park
Attendance: 552
Referee: Haydn Davies

=== Round 9 ===
11 November 2023
14:00

Dudley Kingswinford	26 – 17	Chester

Heathbrook
Attendance: 315
Referee: James Dowds

11 November 2023
14:00

(1 BP) Loughborough Students	38 – 16	Newport (Salop)

East Park
Attendance: 231
Referee: Holly Wood

11 November 2023
14:00

Old Redcliffians	20 – 17	Clifton (1 BP)

Scotland Lane
Attendance: 190
Referee: James Milliner-Woodcock

11 November 2023
14:15

(1 BP) Luctonians	32 – 26	Camborne (2 BP)

Mortimer Park
Attendance: 625
Referee: Callum Watson

11 November 2023
14:30

(1 BP) Bournville	17 – 24	Dings Crusaders (1 BP)

Avery Fields
Attendance: 250
Referee: Neil Sweeney

11 November 2023
14:30

(1 BP) Redruth	29 – 22	Exeter University (1 BP)

Recreation Ground
Attendance: 727
Referee: Ben Simpson

11 November 2023
15:00

Hinckley	17 – 17	Hornets

De Montfort Park
Attendance: 450
Referee: Peter Connor

=== Round 10 ===
18 November 2023
14:00

(1 BP) Camborne	29 – 24	Bournville (2 BP)

Recreation Ground
Attendance: 625
Referee: Tom Evans-Jones

18 November 2023
14:15

(2 BP) Newport (Salop)	29 – 31	Exeter University (1 BP)

The Old Showground
Attendance: 400
Referee: Dan Parrott

18 November 2023
14:30

(1 BP) Clifton	22 – 27	Luctonians (1 BP)

Station Road
Attendance: 212
Referee: Neil Sweeney

18 November 2023
14:30

(1 BP) Hornets	54 – 22	Dudley Kingswinford

The Nest
Attendance: 135
Referee: Haydn Davies

18 November 2023
15:00

(1 BP) Chester	28 – 37	Old Redcliffians (1 BP)

Hare Lane
Attendance: 300
Referee: George Ounsley

18 November 2023
15:00

(1 BP) Dings Crusaders	43 – 17	Loughborough Students

Shaftesbury Park
Attendance: 637
Referee: Nathan Howarth

18 November 2023
15:00

(1 BP) Hinckley	31 –7	Redruth

De Montfort Park
Attendance: 350
Referee: James Dowds

=== Round 11 ===
25 November 2023
14:00

Dudley Kingswinford	24 – 38	Hinckley (1 BP)

Heathbrook
Attendance: 350
Referee: Nathan Howarth

25 November 2023
14:00

Exeter University	12 – 36	Dings Crusaders (1 BP)

Topsham Sports Ground
Attendance: 130
Referee: Holly Wood

25 November 2023
14:00

(1 BP) Loughborough Students	82 – 25	Camborne

East Park
Attendance: 357
Referee: Lloyd Davies

25 November 2023
14:00

(1 BP) Old Redcliffians	25 – 21	Hornets (1 BP)

Scotland Lane
Attendance: 310
Referee: Tom Evans-Jones

25 November 2023
14:15

(1 BP) Luctonians	42 – 19	Chester

Mortimer Park
Attendance: 579
Referee: Ben Simpson

25 November 2023
14:30

(2 BP) Bournville	22 – 27	Clifton (1 BP)

Avery Fields
Attendance: 332
Referee: Peter Connor

25 November 2023
14:30

(1 BP) Redruth	40 – 26	Newport (Salop) (1 BP)

Recreation Ground
Attendance: 741
Referee: James Milliner-Woodcock

=== Round 12 ===
2 December 2023
14:00

(1 BP) Camborne	33 – 18	Exeter University

Recreation Ground
Attendance: 672
Referee: Neil Sweeney

2 December 2023
14:00

Dudley Kingswinford	P – P	Redruth

Heathbrook

- Postponed due to poor weather. Game to be rescheduled for 6th January 2024.

2 December 2023
14:30

(1 BP) Clifton	48 – 26	Loughborough Students (1 BP)

Station Road
Attendance: 101
Referee: Lloyd Davies

2 December 2023
14:30

Hornets	17 – 30	Luctonians (1 BP)

The Nest
Attendance: 369
Referee: James Milliner-Woodcock

2 December 2023
15:00

Chester	18 – 8	Bournville

Hare Lane
Attendance: 250
Referee: Nathan Howarth

2 December 2023
15:00

(1 BP) Dings Crusaders	77 – 12	Newport (Salop)

Shaftesbury Park
Attendance: 357
Referee: James Dowds

2 December 2023
15:00

(1 BP) Hinckley	32 – 22	Old Redcliffians

De Montfort Park
Attendance: 300
Referee: Ben Simpson

=== Round 13 ===
9 December 2023
14:00

(1 BP) Exeter University	29 – 24	Clifton (1 BP)

Topsham Sport Ground
Attendance: 343
Referee: Callum Watson

9 December 2023
14:00

(1 BP) Loughborough Students	54 – 26	Chester (1 BP)

East Park
Attendance: 381
Referee: Ben Simpson

9 December 2023
14:00

(1 BP) Old Redcliffians	45 – 29	Dudley Kingswinford (1 BP)

Scotland Lane
Attendance: 250
Referee: James Dowds

9 December 2023
14:00

Redruth	5 – 26	Dings Crusaders (1 BP)

Recreation Ground
Attendance: 716
Referee: Ben Wood

9 December 2023
14:15

(1 BP) Luctonians	7 – 12	Hinckley

Mortimer Park
Attendance: 438
Referee: Dan Parrott

9 December 2023
14:15

Newport (Salop)	19 – 40	Camborne (1 BP)

The Old Showground
Attendance: 420
Referee: Peter Connor

9 December 2023
14:30

(1 BP) Bournville	24 – 12	Hornets

Avery Fields
Attendance: 260
Referee: Neil Sweeney

=== Round 14 ===
16 December 2023
14:00

Dudley Kingswinford	17 – 3	Bournville

Heathbrook
Attendance: 318
Referee: Benjamin Simpson

16 December 2023
14:00

Old Redcliffians	18 – 17	Luctonians (1 BP)

Scotland Lane
Attendance: 266
Referee: Haydn Davies

16 December 2023
14:00

Redruth	19 – 19	Camborne

Recreation Ground
Attendance: 2,850
Referee: Neil Sweeney

16 December 2023
14:30

Clifton	15 – 15	Dings Crusaders

Station Road
Attendance: 278
Referee: Dan Parrott

16 December 2023
14:30

(1 BP) Hornets	27 – 33	Exeter University (1 BP)

The Nest
Attendance: 384
Referee: Holly Wood

16 December 2023
15:00

(1 BP) Chester	36 – 34	Newport (Salop) (2 BP)

Hare Lane
Attendance: 360
Referee: James O'Brien

16 December 2023
15:00

(1 BP) Hinckley	41 – 28	Loughborough Students (1 BP)

De Montfort Park
Attendance: 700
Referee: Peter Connor

=== Round 12 (rescheduled game) ===
6 January 2024
14:00

(1 BP) Dudley Kingswinford	14 – 19	Redruth

Heathbrook
Attendance: 175
Referee: Peter Connor

- Game rescheduled from 2 December 2023.

=== Round 15 ===
13 January 2024
14:00

(1 BP) Camborne	29 – 38	Clifton (1 BP)

Recreation Ground
Attendance: 536
Referee: Ben Simpson

13 January 2024
14:00

(2 BP) Exeter University	36 – 41	Hinckley (1 BP)

Topsham Sport Ground
Attendance: 321
Referee: Nathan Howarth

13 January 2024
14:00

(1 BP) Loughborough Students	70 – 0	Dudley Kingswinford

East Park
Attendance: 339
Referee: Owen Taylor

13 January 2024
14:15

(1 BP) Luctonians	35 – 17	Redruth

Mortimer Park
Attendance: 457
Referee: Sam Yates

13 January 2024
14:15

Newport (Salop)	12 – 33	Hornets (1 BP)

The Old Showground
Attendance: 159
Referee: James Dowds

13 January 2024
14:30

(1 BP) Bournville	37 – 26	Old Redcliffians (1 BP)

Avery Fields
Attendance: 350
Referee: Callum Watson

13 January 2024
15:00

(1 BP) Dings Crusaders	50 – 7	Chester

Shaftesbury Park
Attendance: 673
Referee: James Milliner-Woodcock

=== Round 16 ===
20 January 2024
14:00

(1 BP) Chester	43 – 40	Camborne (2 BP)

Hare Lane
Attendance: 500
Referee: James O'Brien

20 January 2024
14:00

Dudley Kingswinford	P – P	Exeter University

Heathbrook

- Postponed due to frozen pitch. Game to be rescheduled for 3 February 2024.

20 January 2024
14:00

Old Redcliffians	P – P	Loughborough Students

Scotland Lane

- Postponed due to frozen pitch. Game to be rescheduled for 3 February 2024.

20 January 2024
14:00

(1 BP) Redruth	26 – 21	Clifton (1 BP)

Recreation Ground
Attendance: 698
Referee: Ben Wood

20 January 2024
14:15

(1 BP) Luctonians	24 – 0	Bournville

Mortimer Park
Attendance: 484
Referee: Ben Simpson

20 January 2024
14:30

(1 BP) Hornets	12 – 17	Dings Crusaders

The Nest
Attendance: 306
Referee: Dan Parrott

20 January 2024
15:00

Hinckley	P – P	Newport (Salop)

De Montfort Park

- Postponed due to frozen pitch. Game to be rescheduled for 3 February 2024.

=== Round 17 ===
27 January 2024
14:00

(2 BP) Bournville	25 – 29	Redruth (1 BP)

Avery Fields
Attendance: 320
Referee: Dan Parrott

27 January 2024
14:00

(1 BP) Camborne	31 – 26	Hornets (2 BP)

Recreation Ground
Attendance: 532
Referee: James Milliner-Woodcock

27 January 2024
14:00

(1 BP) Exeter University	35 – 34	Old Redcliffians (2 BP)

Topsham Sport Ground
Attendance: 103
Referee: Neil Sweeney

27 January 2024
14:00

(1 BP) Loughborough Students	30 – 51	Luctonians (1 BP)

East Park
Attendance: 405
Referee: Peter Connor

27 January 2024
14:15

(1 BP) Newport (Salop)	43 – 24	Dudley Kingswinford (1 BP)

The Old Showground
Attendance: 320
Referee: Benjamin Simpson

27 January 2024
14:30

(1 BP) Clifton	40 – 28	Chester (1 BP)

Station Road
Attendance: 204
Referee: Lloyd Davies

27 January 2024
15:00

(1 BP) Dings Crusaders	55 – 19	Hinckley

Shaftesbury Park
Attendance: 441
Referee: Tom Evans-Jones

=== Round 16 (rescheduled games) ===
3 February 2024
14:00

Dudley Kingswinford	19 – 38	Exeter University (1 BP)

Heathbrook
Attendance: 160
Referee: Haydn Davies

- Game rescheduled from 20 January 2024.

3 February 2024
14:00

(1 BP) Old Redcliffians	26 – 15	Loughborough Students

Scotland Lane
Attendance: 349
Referee: James Milliner-Woodcock

- Game rescheduled from 20 January 2024.

3 February 2024
15:00

(1 BP) Hinckley	29 – 21	Newport (Salop)

De Montfort Park
Attendance: 250
Referee: Alex Powdrell

- Game rescheduled from 20 January 2024.

=== Round 18 ===
10 February 2024
14:00

Dudley Kingswinford	14 – 45	Dings Crusaders (1 BP)

Heathbrook
Attendance: 180
Referee: Dan Parrott

10 February 2024
14:00

(1 BP) Old Redcliffians	24 – 5	Newport (Salop)

Scotland Lane
Attendance: 423
Referee: Peter Connor

10 February 2024
14:00

Redruth	19 – 7	Chester

Recreation Ground
Attendance: 753
Referee: Ben Wood

10 February 2024
14:15

(1 BP) Luctonians	28 – 21	Exeter University (1 BP)

Mortimer Park
Attendance: 472
Referee: Callum Watson

10 February 2024
14:30

(1 BP) Bournville	44 – 38	Loughborough Students (2 BP)

Avery Fields
Attendance: 315
Referee: James Dowds

10 February 2024
14:30

(1 BP) Hornets	45 – 27	Clifton (1 BP)

The Nest
Attendance: 412
Referee: Lloyd Davies

10 February 2024
15:00

(1 BP) Hinckley	36 – 15	Camborne

De Montfort Park
Attendance: 300
Referee: Ben Simpson

=== Round 19 ===
17 February 2024
14:00

(1 BP) Camborne	31 – 7	Dudley Kingswinford

Recreation Ground
Attendance: 657
Referee: Tom Evans-Jones

17 February 2024
14:00

Exeter University	24 – 10	Bournville

Topsham Sports Ground
Attendance: 121
Referee: James Milliner-Woodcock

17 February 2024
14:00

(1 BP) Loughborough Students	33 – 22	Redruth (1 BP)

East Park
Attendance: 211
Referee: Neil Sweeney

17 February 2024
14:15

Newport (Salop)	5 – 50	Luctonians

The Old Showground
Attendance: 350
Referee: James Dowds

17 February 2024
14:30

(1 BP) Clifton	31 – 21	Hinckley

Station Road
Attendance: 230
Referee: Peter Connor

17 February 2024
15:00

(1 BP) Chester	13 – 20	Hornets

Hare Lane
Attendance: 350
Referee: Haydn Davies

17 February 2024
15:00

(1 BP) Dings Crusaders	35 – 17	Old Redcliffians

Shaftesbury Park
Attendance: 573
Referee: Aaron Parry

=== Round 20 ===
24 February 2024
14:00

(1 BP) Dudley Kingswinford	33 – 27	Clifton (1 BP)

Heathbrook
Attendance: 350
Referee: James Dowds

24 February 2024
14:00

(1 BP) Loughborough Students	38 – 31	Exeter University (2 BP)

East Park
Attendance: 472
Referee: Peter Connor

24 February 2024
14:00

(1 BP) Old Redcliffians	47 – 15	Camborne

Scotland Lane
Attendance: 423
Referee: James Milliner-Woodcock

24 February 2024
14:15

Luctonians	8 – 17	Dings Crusaders

Mortimer Park
Attendance: 874
Referee: Ben Wiid

24 February 2024
14:30

(1 BP) Bournville	57 – 17	Newport (Salop)

Avery Fields
Attendance: 300
Referee: Dan Parrott

24 February 2024
14:30

Redruth	17 – 17	Hornets

Recreation Ground
Attendance: 657
Referee: Nathan Howarth

24 February 2024
15:00

(1 BP) Hinckley	31 – 38	Chester (1 BP)

De Montfort Park
Attendance: 300
Referee: Sam Yates

=== Round 21 ===
9 March 2024
14:00

Camborne	7 – 27	Luctonians (1 BP)

Recreation Ground
Attendance: 564
Referee: Callum Watson

9 March 2024
14:00

Exeter University	20 – 13	Redruth (1 BP)

Topsham Sports Ground
Attendance: 241
Referee: James Milliner-Woodcock

9 March 2024
14:15

Newport (Salop)	12 – 66	Loughborough Students (1 BP)

The Old Showground
Attendance: 268
Referee: Ben Wood

9 March 2024
14:30

(1 BP) Clifton	38 – 24	Old Redcliffians (1 BP)

Station Road
Attendance: 265
Referee: Tom Evans-Jones

9 March 2024
14:30

(1 BP) Hornets	41 – 12	Hinckley

The Nest
Attendance: 411
Referee: Lloyd Davies

9 March 2024
15:00

(1 BP) Chester	55 – 31	Dudley Kingswinford (1 BP)

Hare Lane
Attendance: 300
Referee: Jack Moorhouse

9 March 2024
15:00

(1 BP) Dings Crusaders	59 – 10	Bournville

Shaftesbury Park
Attendance: 449
Referee: Jack Sutton

=== Round 22 ===
16 March 2024
14:00

(1 BP) Exeter University	29 – 24	Newport (Salop) (2 BP)

Topsham Sports Ground
Attendance: 400
Referee: Michael Lamb

16 March 2024
14:00

Loughborough Students	10 – 43	Dings Crusaders (1 BP)

East Park
Attendance: 189
Referee: Nathan Howarth

16 March 2024
14:00

(1 BP) Old Redcliffians	38 – 29	Chester (1 BP)

Scotland Lane
Attendance: 219
Referee: Simon Waite

16 March 2024
14:30

(1 BP) Bournville	46 – 35	Camborne (1 BP)

Avery Fields
Attendance: 250
Referee: James Dowds

16 March 2024
14:30

Redruth	23 – 23	Hinckley

Recreation Ground
Attendance: 645
Referee: Ben Simpson

16 March 2024
15:00

(2 BP) Dudley Kingswinford	35 – 40	Hornets (1 BP)

Heathbrook
Attendance: 202
Referee: Peter Caunt

16 March 2024
15:00

(1 BP) Luctonians	8 – 10	Clifton

Mortimer Park
Attendance: 698
Referee: Neil Sweeney

=== Round 23 ===
23 March 2024
14:09

(1 BP) Camborne	50 – 39	Loughborough Students (1 BP)

Recreation Ground
Attendance: 636
Referee: Tom Evans-Jones

23 March 2024
14:15

(1 BP) Newport (Salop)	29 – 12	Redruth

The Old Showground
Attendance: 250
Referee: James Dowds

23 March 2024
14:30

(1 BP) Clifton	48 – 5	Bournville

Station Road
Attendance: 183
Referee: Alex Rose

23 March 2024
14:30

(2 BP) Hornets	35 – 37	Old Redcliffians (1 BP)

The Nest
Attendance: 426
Referee: James Milliner-Woodcock

23 March 2024
15:00

(1 BP) Chester	39 – 19	Luctonians

Hare Lane
Attendance: 400
Referee: James O'Brien

23 March 2024
15:00

(1 BP) Dings Crusaders	49 – 38	Exeter University (1 BP)

Shaftesbury Park
Attendance: 673
Referee: Haydn Davies

23 March 2024
15:00

(1 BP) Hinckley	50 – 20	Dudley Kingswinford

De Montfort Park
Attendance: 400
Referee: Dan Parrott

=== Round 24 ===
6 April 2024
14:00

Exeter University	22 – 59	Camborne (1 BP)

Topsham Sport Ground
Attendance: 67
Referee: James Dowds

6 April 2024
14:00

(1 BP) Loughborough Students	40 – 33	Clifton (2 BP)

East Park
Attendance: 415
Referee: Callum Watson

6 April 2024
14:00

Redruth	P – P	Dudley Kingswinford

Recreation Ground

- Postponed as Dudley Kingswinford were unable to raise a side. Game to be rescheduled for 20 April 2024.

6 April 2024
14:15

Newport (Salop)	13 – 45	Dings Crusaders (1 BP)

The Old Showground
Attendance: 301
Referee: Benjamin Simpson

6 April 2024
14:30

(1 BP) Bournville	50 – 38	Chester (1 BP)

Avery Fields
Attendance: 220
Referee: Neil Sweeney

6 April 2024
15:00

(1 BP) Luctonians	49 – 5	Hornets

Mortimer Park
Attendance: 547
Referee: Dan Parrott

6 April 2024
15:00

(1 BP) Old Redcliffians	40 – 17	Hinckley

Scotland Lane
Attendance: 350
Referee: Lloyd Davies

=== Round 25 ===
13 April 2024
14:00

(2 BP) Camborne	33 – 38	Newport (Salop) (1 BP)

Recreation Ground
Attendance: 675
Referee: James Milliner-Woodcock

- Newport (Salop) are relegated.

13 April 2024
14:00

Dudley Kingswinford	14 – 48	Old Redcliffians (1 BP)

Heathbrook
Attendance: 550
Referee: Nathan Howarth

- Dudley Kingswinford are relegated.

13 April 2024
14:30

(1 BP) Clifton	52 – 24	Exeter University

Station Road
Attendance: 288
Referee: Dan Parrott

13 April 2024
14:30

(2 BP) Hornets	24 – 30	Bournville (1 BP)

The Nest
Attendance: 421
Referee: James Dowds

13 April 2024
15:00

Chester	20 – 38	Loughborough Students (1 BP)

Hare Lane
Attendance: 250
Referee: Henry Pearson

13 April 2024
15:00

(1 BP) Dings Crusaders	69 – 7	Redruth

Shaftesbury Park
Attendance: 912
Referee: Tom Evans-Jones

- Dings Crusaders are champions.

13 April 2024
15:00

(2 BP) Hinckley	29 – 32	Luctonians (1 BP)

De Montfort Park
Attendance: 750
Referee: Benjamin Wood

=== Round 24 (rescheduled game) ===
20 April 2024
14:00

(1 BP) Redruth	38 – 19	Dudley Kingswinford

Recreation Ground
Attendance: 857
Referee: James Milliner-Woodcock

- Game rescheduled from 6 April 2024.

=== Round 26 ===
27 April 2024
15:00

(1 BP) Bournville	28 – 27	Hinckley (1 BP)

Avery Fields
Attendance: 320
Referee: Nathan Howarth

27 April 2024
15:00

(1 BP) Dings Crusaders	109 – 0	Camborne

Shaftesbury Park
Attendance: 955
Referee: Benjamin Wood

27 April 2024
15:00

(1 BP) Exeter University	38 – 19	Chester

Topsham Sport Ground
Attendance: 155
Referee: Benjamin Simpson

27 April 2024
15:00

(1 BP) Loughborough Students	62 – 5	Hornets

East Park
Attendance: 405
Referee: Haydn Davies

27 April 2024
15:00

(1 BP) Luctonians	64 – 5	Dudley Kingswinford

Mortimer Park
Attendance: 547
Referee: James Milliner-Woodcock

27 April 2024
15:00

(1 BP) Newport (Salop)	26 – 24	Clifton (2 BP)

The Old Showground
Attendance: 107
Referee: Peter Connor

27 April 2024
15:00

(1 BP) Old Redcliffians	43 – 24	Redruth (1 BP)

Scotland Lane
Attendance: 400
Referee: James Dowds

== Attendances ==
Club	Home games	Total	Average	Highest	Lowest	% Capacity
Bournville	13	4,406	339	800	220	N/A
Camborne	13	9,924	763	2,678	520	11%
Chester	13	3,960	305	500	200	15%
Clifton	13	2,769	213	290	101	10%
Dings Crusaders	13	8,551	658	1,012	357	29%
Dudley Kingswinford	13	3,777	291	550	110	13%
Exeter University	13	2,799	215	400	67	N/A
Hinckley	13	5,252	404	750	202	20%
Hornets	13	4,758	366	493	135	33%
Loughborough Students	13	4,176	321	472	189	32%
Luctonians	13	7,119	548	874	398	22%
Newport (Salop)	13	3,744	288	420	107	N/A
Old Redcliffians	13	3,733	287	423	70	29%
Redruth	13	11,084	853	2,850	545	24%

== Individual statistics ==
=== Top points scorers ===
Rank	Player	Team	Points
1	Ben Priddey	Camborne	155
2	Ashley Groves	Old Redcliffians	154
3	James Preston	Chester	149
4	Rory Volwles	Hinckley	146
5	Jack Park	Exeter University	145
6	Jacob Perry	Dings Crusaders	144
7	Jacob Fewtrell	Bournville	140
8	Ben Link	Luctonians	135
9	Jamie Elswood	Hornets	130

=== Top try scorers ===
Rank	Player	Team	Tries
1	Ben Priddey	Camborne	31
2	Ben Link	Luctonians	27
3	Charlie Grimes	Luctonians	23
4	Nathan Decalmer	Bournville	19
4	Joseph Hawkesbury	Dings Crusaders	19
5	Alex Ducker	Camborne	17
6	Jalen Curry	Old Redcliffians	14
6	Solomon Taufa	Dings Crusaders	14
7	Harry Hone	Dings Crusaders	13
7	Benjamin Pointon	Hinckley	13

== See also ==
- 2023–24 National League 1
- 2023–24 National League 2 North
- 2023–24 National League 2 East
