= Cross Green =

Rugby union stadium in Otley, United Kingdom

Coordinates: 53°54′29″N 1°41′14″W

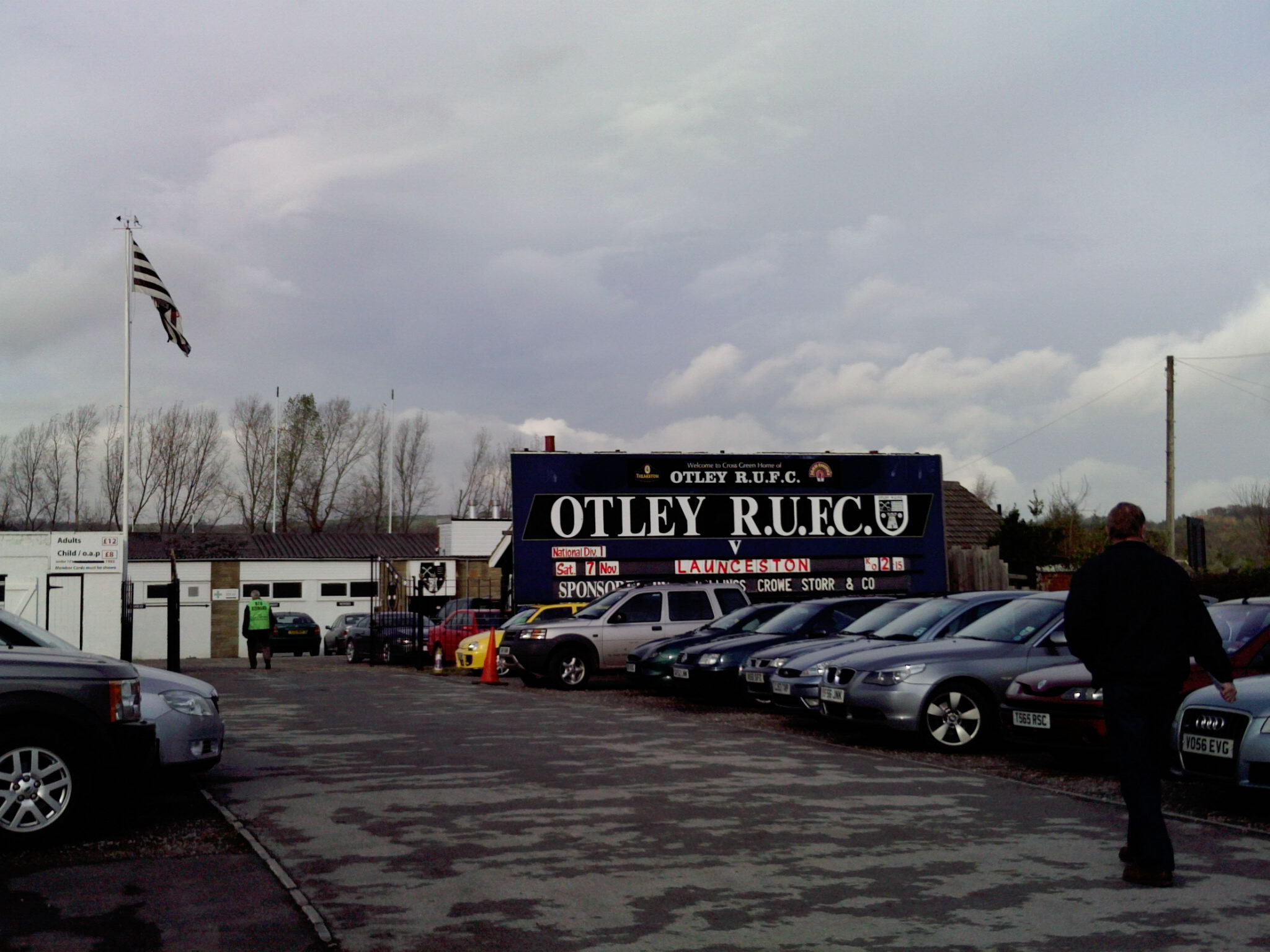
Cross Green

Cross Green is an area in the east of Otley, England, and the location of a multi-use sports stadium. The stadium is currently used mostly for rugby union matches and is the home ground of Otley R.U.F.C. It is on the eastern edge of the town, off Pool Road and is close to the new Asda supermarket. Otley RUFC has its own car park.

Cross Green is also the home of Otley Cricket Club, the ground lies to the side of the rugby field. Otley Athletics and Otley Badminton Club are also based at Cross Green. According to a club estimate from the early 1990s, the rugby ground was listed as having capacity of around 7,000 - 6148 standing with 852 seats. This capacity was temporarily raised to 7,500 for the 1991 Rugby World Cup, hosting United States versus Italy, it was the smallest venue in the tournament that year.

Cross Green was the site for the famous victory of the North of England over the All Blacks in 1979 and again in 1988 when the Wallabies were the victims of a North victory.

Cross Green is the host venue for Music Festival LS21 Live! which is a summer festival organized by GeHo Events. Sheffield band The Reverend and the Makers were the 2013 Headline Act.
