= Airedale-Wharfedale Senior Cricket League =

Regional English Cricket League

Airedale and Wharfedale Senior Cricket League
- Countries: England
- Format: Limited overs cricket
- First edition: 1936 (Founded)
- Tournament format: League
- Number of teams: 12 (Premier Division)
- Current champion: Otley CC
- Most successful: Otley CC (20 titles)
- Website: https://awscl.play-cricket.com/

The Airedale and Wharfedale Senior Cricket League was established in 1936 and is an amateur cricket competition in North Yorkshire and West Yorkshire. The league is structured into 6 divisions, with two clubs promoted and relegated into each division respectively. The league set-up was restructured in 2018 allowing club 2nd XI teams to be promoted into divisions that were previously reserved for 1st XI teams.

Participating clubs are spread over a relatively wide geographical area in North Yorkshire and West Yorkshire. The location of the clubs broadly follow the valleys and landscapes of the River Aire and the River Wharfe.

== 2024 Member Clubs ==
As of 2024, the league consists of six divisions of 12 teams, with a further two divisions for member club's 3rd XIs.

=== 1st XI Premier Division ===
- Addingham
- Adel
- Beckwithshaw
- Burley in Wharfedale
- Collingham and Linton
- Horsforth Hall Park
- North Leeds
- Otley
- Pool
- Saltaire
- Steeton
- Tong Park Esholt

=== 1st XI Division One ===
- Bardsey
- Bilton
- Bolton Villas
- Calverley St Wilfred’s
- Follifoot
- Guiseley
- Harden
- Ilkley
- Kirkstall Educational
- Menston
- New Rover
- Olicanian

=== 1st XI Division Two ===
- Alwoodley
- Bingley Congregationals
- Green Lane
- Horsforth
- Kirkstall Educational
- Leeds Modernians
- Menston
- Old Leodiensians
- Rodley
- Shadwell
- Skipton
- Thackley

=== 2nd XI Division One ===
- Adel 2nd XI
- Burley in Wharfedale 2nd XI
- Collingham and Linton 2nd XI
- Horsforth Hall Park 2nd XI
- Ilkley 2nd XI
- Kirkstall Educational 2nd XI
- Menston 2nd XI
- North Leeds 2nd XI
- Otley 2nd XI
- Rawdon 2nd XI
- Steeton 2nd XI
- Tong Park Esholt 2nd XI

=== 2nd XI Division Two ===
- Addingham 2nd XI
- Alwoodley 2nd XI
- Bardsey 2nd XI
- Beckwithshaw 2nd XI
- Bilton 2nd XI
- Bingley Congregationals 2nd XI
- Calverley St Wilfrids 2nd XI
- Green Lane 2nd XI
- Guiseley 2nd XI
- New Rover 2nd XI
- Olicanian 2nd XI
- Pool 2nd XI

=== 2nd XI Division Three ===
- Bolton Villas 2nd XI
- Colton Institute 2nd XI
- Follifoot 2nd XI
- Harden 2nd XI
- Horsforth 2nd XI
- Leeds Modernians 2nd XI
- Old Leodiensians 2nd XI
- Rodley 2nd XI
- Saltaire 2nd XI
- Shadwell 2nd XI
- Skipton 2nd XI
- Thackley 2nd XI

== Champions ==
Championships	Club	Year
20	Otley	1937, 1939, 1942, 1943, 1966, 1974, 1982, 1985, 1986, 1987, 1988, 1992, 1993, 2014, 2015, 2018, 2019, 2024, 2025, 2026
10	Guiseley	1947, 1957, 1958, 1965, 1966, 1967, 1969, 1971, 1973, 2000
9	Ilkley	1938, 1946, 1947, 1949, 1952, 1955, 1959, 1981, 1990
8	Knaresborough	1975, 1976, 1977, 1978, 1979, 1980, 1983, 1984
6	North Leeds	1948, 1951, 1953, 1956, 1962, 1972
5	Beckwithshaw	1995, 2009, 2013, 2016, 2017
4	Adel	1989, 1997, 1998, 2002
4	Bilton	2001, 2003, 2004, 2005
4	Horsforth Hall Park	1940, 1960, 1968, 1994
3	Burley in Wharfedale	1944, 1964, 2010
3	Otley D.P & E	1954, 1961, 1963
3	Rawdon	1947, 1996, 2022
3	Collingham & Linton	2007, 2012, 2023
2	Horsforth	1960, 1991
2	Kempton	1960, 1968
2	Kirkstall Educational	2006, 2008
2	Thackley	1967, 2011
1	Earby	1941
1	Gargrave	1970
1	Illingworth St Mary's	1965
1	Menston	1950
1	Saltaire	2021
1	Skipton	1945
1	Steeton	1999
1	Yeadon	1936

Source: League Honours 1936 - 2017

== Performance by season from 2004 ==
Key
Gold	Champions
Blue	Left League
Red	Relegated

Performance by season, from 2004
Club	2004	2005	2006	2007	2008	2009	2010	2011	2012	2013	2014	2015	2016	2017	2018	2019	2020	2021	2022	2023	2024	2025	2026
Adel	10	3	1	2	4	7	9	10	12						6	11					7	12	
Addingham																3	5	7	7	11		3	5
Beckwithshaw	2	11		3	5	1	2	8	3	1	3	2	1	1	12			6	11			9	
Ben Rhydding									10	5	12												
Bilton	1	4	7	9	12			6	6	2	4	4	8	6	7	9	8	8	10	10	12		4
Burley-in-Wharfedale		7	5	5	9	5	1	3	2	4	2	5	3	3	2	5	3	4	4	6	3	2	7
Calverley St Wilfrids						12																	
Collingham & Linton				1	10	2	5	7	1	8	6	6	10	11		8	4	5	6	1	2	7	6
Colton Institute														12									
Follifoot	7	5	3	12				9	8	11		12			9	2	12						
Green Lane	3	8	8	10	8	9	3	11															
Guiseley	6	9			2	8	6	4	7	7	10	11		7	11								
Harden										12													
Horsforth													4	5	10	6	9	12					
Horsforth Hall Park	12																		5	7	6	5	9
Ilkley											5	9	6	8	5	4	7	9	12				
Kirkstall Educational	8	10	2	7	1	10	8	2	9	6	9	3	12										12
Menston	11																						
New Rover																			8	12			
North Leeds	4	2	4	6	3	4	12					7	9	10	3	10	10	10	9	8	10	11	10
Olicanian																	11	11					
Otley	9	6	11	8	6	6	4	5	5	3	1	1	2	2	1	1	1	2	2	2	1	1	1
Pool			9	4	11		11			10	11		5	9	8	12				5	5	8	8
Rawdon	5	1	6		7	3	10	12			8	8	7	4	4	7	2	3	1	3	11		
Saltaire																	6	1	3	4	4	4	2
Silsden						11																	
Steeton			10	11					4	9	7	10	11								8	6	3
Thackley							7	1	11														
Tong Park Esholt		12	12																	9	9	10	11
References																	(Note: Coronavirus pandemic forced a reduction in league activity - halving the number of matches played.)						
