= Otley Cricket Club =

Cricket club in West Yorkshire, England

(England) Otley CC
- Full name: Otley Cricket Club
- Founded: 1820
- Ground: Cross Green
- Chairman: Alex Atkinson
- President: Chris P. Smith
- Captain: Josh Atkinson

Official website
- www.otleycricketclub.co.uk

Otley Cricket Club is a member of Airedale & Wharfedale Cricket League. The Club is based at Cross Green, Otley, West Yorkshire, England. The Club runs 3 Senior Sides and a full Junior Section ranging from Under 17 to Under 9.

== History ==
One of the County's oldest cricket clubs, Otley CC was formed in 1820 although there are records that suggest that cricket was played in the town even before this date. Initially the club played on a ground now occupied by the cemetery and moved to its present Cross Green ground in 1862.

For the first 73 years of the club's existence it played friendly matched but in 1893 the Club took a huge step forward by becoming founder members of the Airedale & Wharfedale Cricket League. The Club continued to play cricket in the League until after the First World War when in 1919 the Club joined the Yorkshire Council League. The Club played in this competition until 1936 when they joined the re-formed AWSCL. Otley instantly made their presence felt by winning the first of its league titles the following year.

In 1942, Otley won the AWSCL for the 2nd time, and also got their maiden win in the League's Cup competition with victory over Menston CC in the Waddilove Cup. During this period the Club had many successful players; H. Daphne, W. Bishop, J. Warburton, H. Bolton & R. Scarr to name a few. The latter two would go on to write their names into the League record books. In 1943 the Club retained the Waddilove Cup with H. Daphne taking match winning figures of 7–22.

From 1950 to 1980 saw the Club win 5 more Waddilove Cups, starting the careers of cricketer's such as Mike Bailey, Barrie Crighton, Ray Beadle, John Harker, Steve Davies and Chris Smith. Smith has been at the forefront of everything going on at the Club ever since, with a successful playing career spanning four decades and his more recent off field efforts with fundraising events and serving as the Club's current Chairman.

During the period of the 1980s and the early '90s, the likes of Beadle, Smith, Davies and Wadkin led the Club's most successful period with numerous league and Cup triumphs. Thanks to a crop of highly talented juniors coming through such as Hill, Hunt, Conway, Davey, Chaplin and the Wolfenden brothers who pushed onto the 1st XI saw the Club win both 1st & 2nd Team League titles, the Waddilove Cup and the Burmah Oil Trophy in 1988.

The trophies have dried up over the last 20 years, with defeats in the 2006 and 2008 Waddilove Cup Finals against Bilton and Kirkstall Educational and defeats in the Birtwhistle Cup Final in 2008 and 2009 both against Kirkstall.

== Honours ==
=== 1st XI ===
AWSCL Division A :- 1937, 1939, 1942, 1943, 1966(JOINT), 1974, 1982, 1985, 1986, 1987, 1988, 1992, 1993

Waddilove Cup:- 1942, 1943, 1958, 1959, 1960, 1972, 1976, 1981, 1985, 1987, 1988

=== 2nd XI ===
AWSCL Division A:- 1988, 1993, 2013

Birtwhistle Cup:- 1986, 1994

=== 3rd XI ===
AWSCL Champions:- 2013,

=== Club awards ===
Burmah Oil Trophy:- 1974, 1986, 1988, 1993

== 2013 season ==
Otley enjoyed a terrific season in 2013 with silverware being brought to Cross Green for the first time since 1994. The 2nd XI won Division A(Reserve League Champions) and were Runners-up to Guiseley in the Birtwhistle Cup. The 3rd XI also were Runners-up in the Chappell Cup, but won the Championship Play-off with victory over Adel. The 1st XI finished 3rd in Division A.

== Transfers 2014 ==
=== Players In ===
- Jamie Pickering from Castleford

== Transfers 2013 ==
=== Players In ===
- James Davies from Bradford & Bingley
- Daniel Temm from Guiseley
- Craig Hunt from Undercliffe
- James Wilcox from Upper Wharfedale

=== Players Out ===
- Liam Mulligan to Kirkstall Educational
- Danny Gautrey to Colton Institute
- Andrew Ross returning to Australia
- Jonathon Hughes to Ilkley
