= St Peter's Vicarage, Vauxhall =

Coordinates: 51.486764°N 0.118415°W

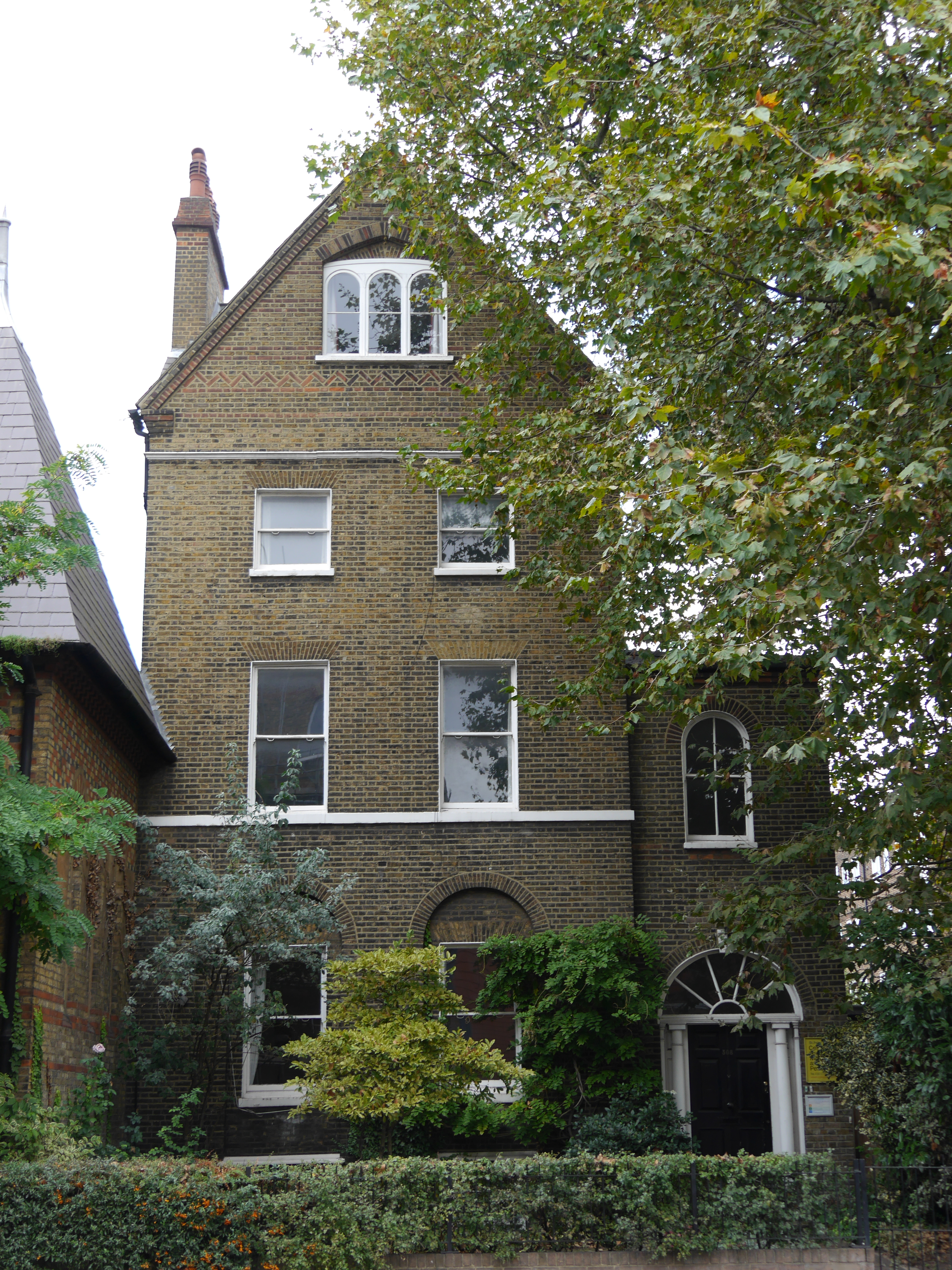
St Peter's Vicarage, 2014

St Peter's Vicarage is an Anglican church vicarage at 308 Kennington Lane, Vauxhall, London SE11.

It was built in the late 18th century, and has been Grade II listed since 1974. St Peter's Church is next door at no 310.
