= Mary Adshead =

English painter (1904–1995)

- Self-portrait (1931)
- Born: 15 February 1904; Bloomsbury, London, England
- Died: 3 September 1995 (aged 91); London, England
- Education: Slade School of Art
- Known for: Painting, murals
- Spouse: Stephen Bone
- Children: 3, including Quentin Bone

Mary Adshead (15 February 1904 - 3 September 1995) was an English painter, muralist, illustrator and designer.

== Biography ==
Adshead was born in Bloomsbury, London, as the only child of Stanley Davenport Adshead, architect, watercolourist, and Professor of Civic Design first at Liverpool, and later at London University, and his wife Annie. Mary attended Putney High School from 1916 to 1919 and then spent six months in Paris. Due to her fathers' position within London University, she was able to enrol at the Slade School of Art in 1921, aged just sixteen. There Henry Tonks recognised her ability and arranged her first mural commission, for a boys' club in Wapping, working with Rex Whistler. This success led to further commissions. Her next mural, A Tropical Fantasy, was carried out in 1924 and was on a desert island theme for the professor of architecture at Liverpool University, Charles Reilly. This mural still exists and is on display at Liverpool University Art Gallery. A large mural by Adshead, The Housing of the People, was part of the 1924 British Empire Exhibition at Wembley in London.

Another mural commission was for Lord Beaverbrook's Newmarket house. Her mandate was to decorate his dining-room with Newmarket racing scenes and portraits of his friends, such as Arnold Bennett, Lady Louise Mountbatten, and Winston Churchill, on their way to the racecourse. The eleven panels, known by the title An English Holiday, was not fully completed as Beaverbrook became concerned that he would be daily faced with the portraits if he ever fell out with any of them. Beaverbrook paid Adshead a two-thirds rejection fee and returned the completed panels which were exhibited in a London department store in Sloane Square in 1930. Later all but three of the panels were destroyed by fire whilst in storage.

Lady Edwina Mountbatten waiting at a puncture on her way to Newmarket

In 1934 Adshead was commissioned to paint murals for the auditorium, designed by her father to replace one lost to fire, on Victoria Pier at Colwyn Bay. After the pier's partial collapse, these were thought unrecoverable, but, as of March 2018, several siginificnat parts been recovered, along with parts of another by Eric Ravilious, from the pier's tea-rooms. Adshead also painted a mural for the British Pavilion at the Paris International Exhibition of 1937.

Adshead's first solo exhibition was held in 1930 at the Goupil Gallery and included the painting The Morning after the Flood which is now in the Tate collection. Working with her husband she illustrated two children's books. In 1930 she was elected a member of the New English Art Club.

In April 1941, Adshead submitted a small number of paintings to the War Artists' Advisory Committee, of which the Committee purchased one. During the war, she also created murals for a public canteen in Birmingham and for a service men's club. She designed the Universal Postal Union pictorial issue of stamps for the GPO in 1949, followed by designs for 1951 Festival of Britain stamps, and she designed the frame around the portrait of Queen Elizabeth II on the 8d, 9d, 10d and 11d Wilding series definitive stamps. In 1950 she decorated the fourth-floor restaurant of Selfridge's with jungle scenes. Other commissions included poster designs for London Transport, in both 1927 and 1937, and several murals, now lost, for Bank Underground Station as well as painting sets for the film Cleopatra. Despite her busy work schedule, she also found time to organise the Society of Mural Painters.

In 1929 Adshead married Stephen Bone, the son of the artist Sir Muirhead Bone. The marriage produced two sons and a daughter. After her husband's death in 1958, Adshead travelled widely in both Europe and the United States.

In 1966 she produced the volume Travelling with a Sketchbook: A Guide to Carry on a First Sketching Holiday.

She studied techniques of mosaic decoration in Ravenna and Sicily and had a number of exhibitions of her work both as a solo artist and alongside the works left by Stephen Bone. In 1982 she completed a mosaic mural for Beatson Walk underpass in Rotherhithe which depicted the Fighting Temeraire; a project which required long hours of work inside a cold tunnel during winter. Despite some lameness, she blamed on long periods painting off ladders, Adshead remained an active working artist until the end of her life.

Adshead died on 3 September 1995 in London, at the age of 91.

== Exhibited works ==
Adshead's paintings are in many public gallery collections including The Tate, the Graves Art Gallery Sheffield, the Imperial War Museum, Manchester City Art Gallery, the London Transport Museum and The University Art Gallery Liverpool. There are also several surviving mural paintings. Notable works by Adshead included murals, produced with Stephen Bone, for the liner RMS Queen Mary in 1935-36 which were not installed, a triptych for St Mary and All Saints Church in Plymstock near Plymouth in 1957, a decorative pool in the Telephone Exchange Courtyard in Guernsey in 1966 and a mural for a pedestrian subway in Rotherhithe in 1983.

An exhibition of her work was held at The University of Liverpool Art Gallery (January–April 2005), Graves Art Gallery Sheffield (June–September 2005) and Kingston upon Thames Art Gallery (October–November 2005).
