= St Anselm's Church, Kennington =

Church in Kennington, London, England

Coordinates: 51.488743°N 0.111765°W

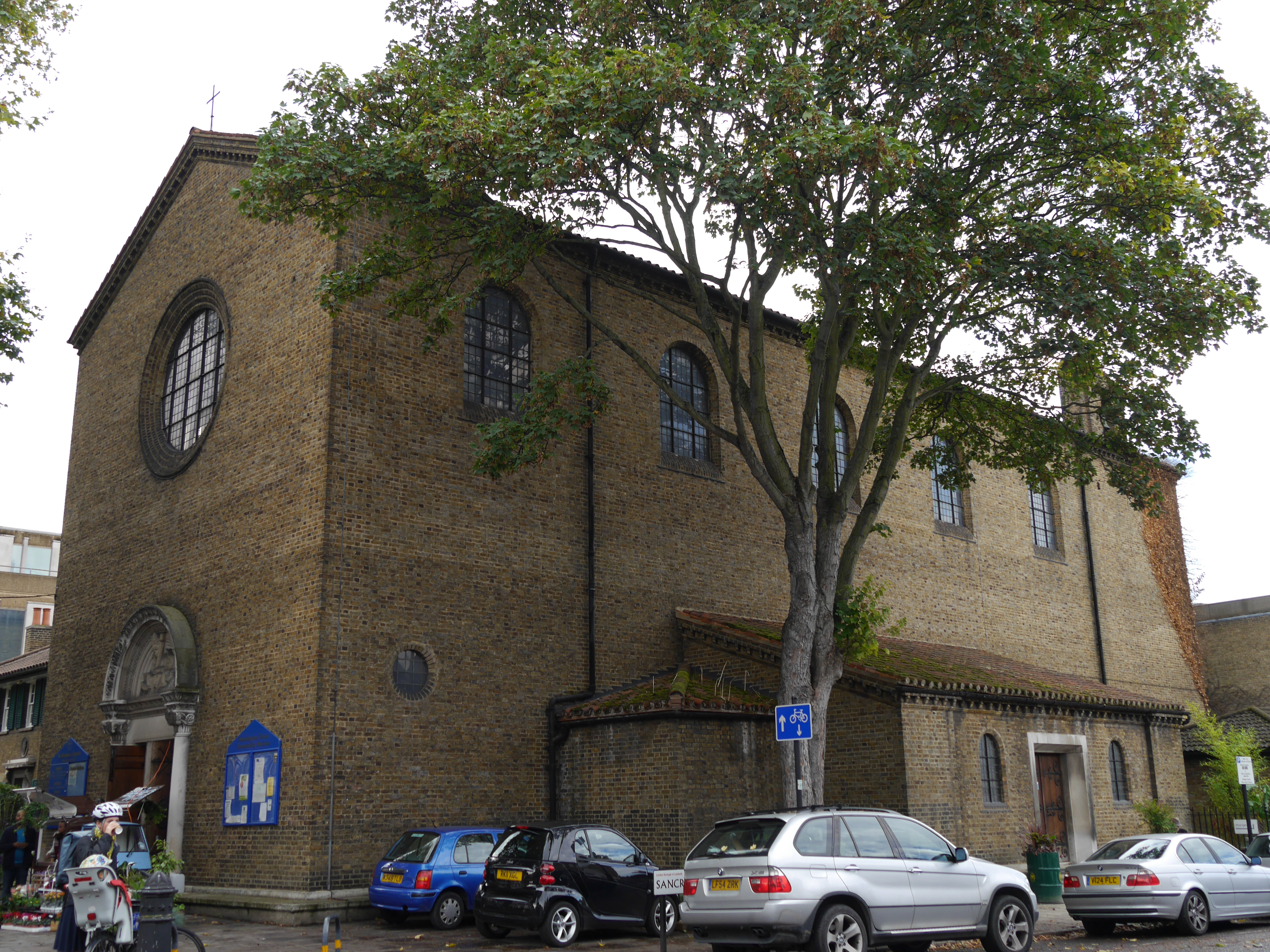
St Anselm's, 2014

St Anselm's Church is a Grade II listed church at 286 Kennington Road, Kennington, London SE11, built in 1932–33 by Stanley Davenport Adshead and Stanley Churchill Ramsey, on the foundations of an earlier church whose building was interrupted by the First World War; the present church is famously described as "barn-like".

With St Peter's Church, Vauxhall, it forms the North Lambeth parish.
