= Stanley Ramsey =

British architect

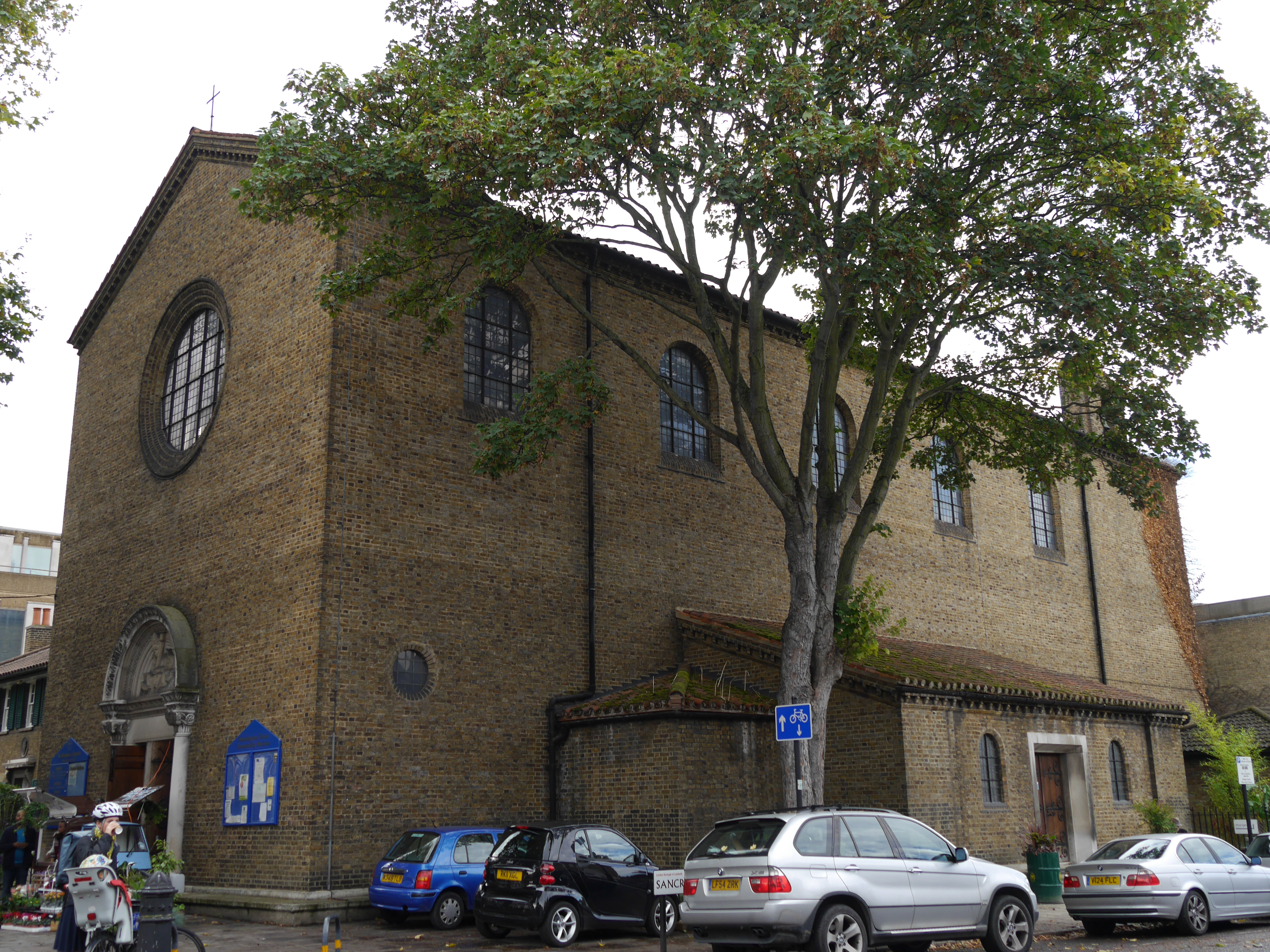
St Anselm's, 2014

Stanley Churchill Ramsey (1882 – 25 December 1968) was a British architect, who worked in partnership with Stanley Davenport Adshead from 1911 to 1931. In 1911, Adshead was invited to design the Duchy of Cornwall Estate in Kennington, and took Ramsey into partnership. In addition to architecture the partnership also designed the brass box of the Princess Mary Christmas gift box.

== Notable buildings ==
- St Anselm's Church, Kennington (1932–33) with Adshead
