= Francis Dodd (artist) =

British artist (1874–1949)

Francis Edgar Dodd RA
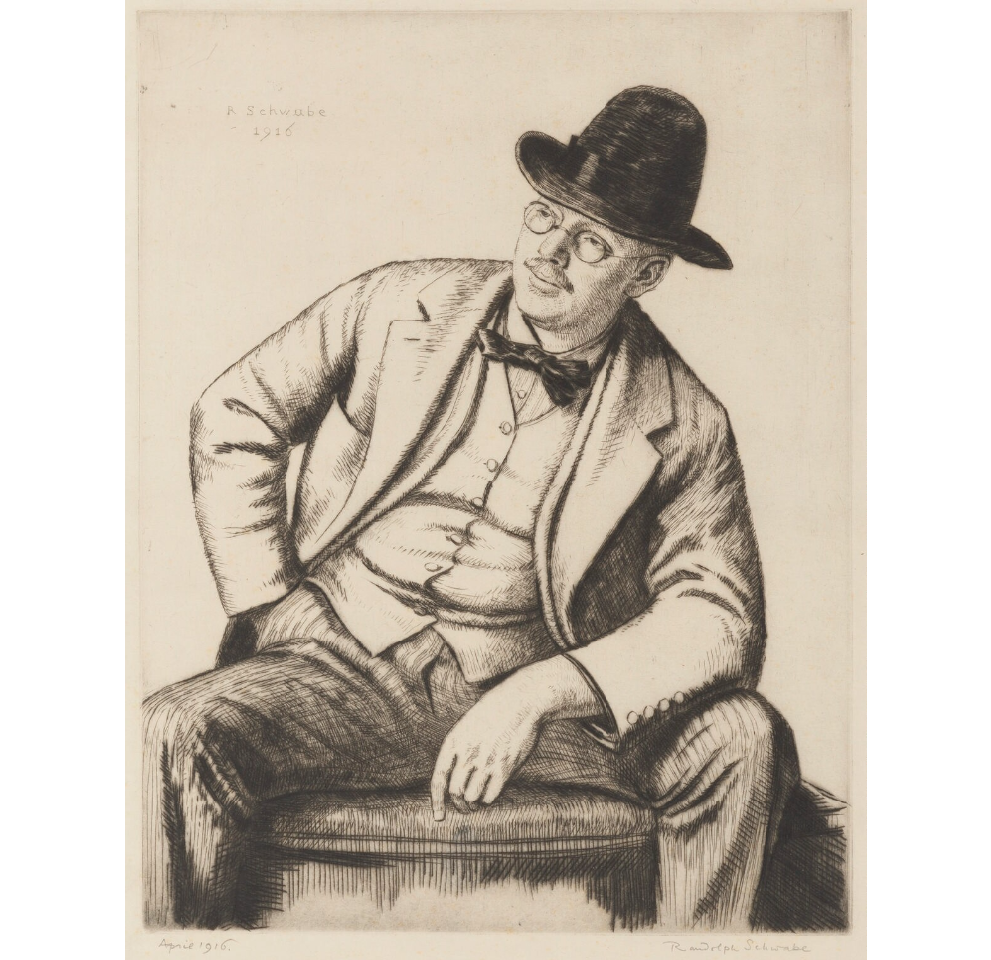
- Dodd by Randolph Schwabe, 1916
- Born: 29 November 1874; Holyhead, Wales
- Died: 7 March 1949 (aged 74); Blackheath, London
- Education: Glasgow School of Art
- Known for: Painting and printmaking
- Spouses: Mary Arabella Brouncker Ingle (died 1948); Ellen Margaret Tanner
- Elected: Royal Academy of Arts, 1935

Francis Edgar Dodd RA (29 November 1874 – 7 March 1949) was a Welsh portrait painter, landscape artist and printmaker. His early work was in oil, watercolour and engravings. He served as an official war artists in the First World War and was a member of the Royal society of portrait painters since 1911.

== Biography ==
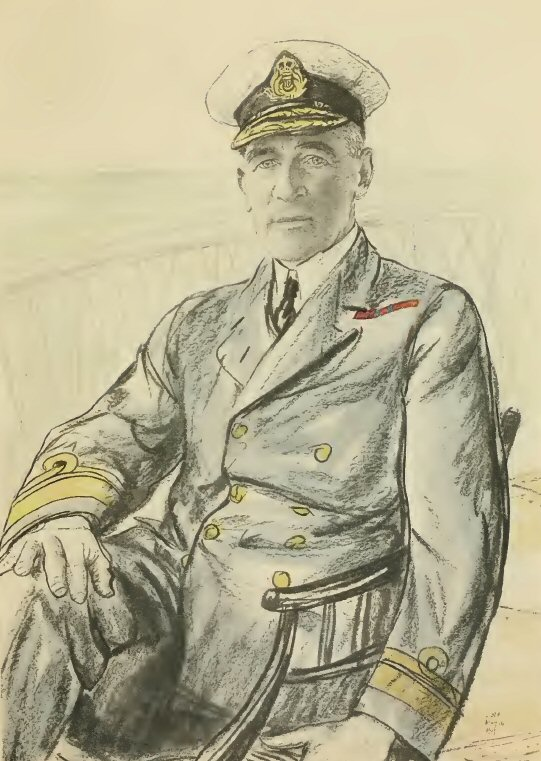
Portrait of Reginald Tyrwhitt by Dodd, from Admirals of the British Navy published 1917

Dodd was born in Holyhead, Anglesey, Wales, the son of a Wesleyan minister. He trained at the Glasgow School of Art alongside Muirhead Bone, who married Dodd's sister, Gertrude. At Glasgow, Dodd won the Haldane Scholarship in 1893 and then travelled around France, Italy and later Spain. Dodd returned to England in 1895 and settled in Manchester, becoming friends with Charles Holden, before moving to Blackheath in London in 1904.

== First World War ==
During World War I, in 1916, he was appointed an official war artist by Charles Masterman, the head of the War Propaganda Bureau, WPB, after being recommended by his brother in-law, Muirhead Bone when a portraitist was needed. In Feburary of 1917 he travelled to France and worked on the Western Front, where he produced 32 portraits of senior military figures. in the span of eight weeks. After the eight weeks in France he returned to Britain and was sent to the British Navy where he spent eight months with the Grand fleet, while there he finished about 105 portraits. He resigned from his post in 1918 before the end of the war. His portraits were used in newspapers and in publications, more specifically two, Generals of the British Army, and Admirals of the British Navy. These publications included 13 coloured portraits of various high ranking military figures with small biographies of each figure.

== Post war period ==
Following the war, in the 1920s he continued to capture the likeness of people with commissions. Dodd earned a considerable peacetime reputation for the quality of his watercolours and portrait commissions. In 1923 he began exhibiting at the Royal academy, he was elected as an Associate of the Royal Academy in 1927 and then a full Member in 1935.He was appointed a trustee of the Tate Gallery in 1929, a position he held for six years.

From 1911 Dodd lived at Arundel House (51 Blackheath Park) in Blackheath, London SE3, until he killed himself in 1949.

Professional and academic associations
Preceded by Thomas Edwin Mostyn	President of the Manchester Academy of Fine Arts; 1920–24	Succeeded by Bertram Nicholls
