= Gertrude Helena Bone =

Edwardian writer

Gertrude Bone
- Born: Gertrude Helena Dodd; 1876
- Died: 1962 (aged 85–86)
- Occupation: Writer
- Notable work: Women of the Country (1913); Old Spain (1936), with Muirhead Bone
- Spouse: Sir Muirhead Bone (m. 1903)
- Children: 2

Gertrude Helena Bone, Lady Bone (née Dodd; 1876–1962) was a British writer who published during the Edwardian era. She wrote short stories, three novels, and several illustrated collections.

== Life ==
Gertrude Dodd was the daughter of the Methodist minister Benjamin Dodd, and younger sister to the artist Francis Dodd. She was raised in Glasgow, where her brother attended Garnett Hill School and met Muirhead Bone, her future husband. Gertrude and Muirhead became engaged in 1898, but could not afford to marry until five years later, when he published his first portfolio of drawings. They married in 1903 and moved to Thamescote, Chiswick.

Their first son, Stephen Bone, was born the next year on 13 November 1904 in Chiswick. A second son, Gavin Bone, was born in 1907. Gertrude Bone, like her father, was a "staunch Methodist": Stephen Bone remembered his childhood as one in which "presents, entertaining, and alcohol were banished; pencil and paper for drawing were deemed sufficient diversion at the house." In 1913, the family moved from Chiswick to Byways, Steep, near Petersfield.

In the 1920s and 1930s, Gertrude and Muirhead Bone traveled abroad extensively, especially in Italy and Spain. In 1937, Muirhead Bone was knighted, and Gertrude became Lady Gertrude Bone. Their second son Gavin died in 1942. Muirhead died of cancer in 1953. Their first son Stephen died of cancer in 1958. Gertrude Bone died in 1962.

== Writing ==
Gertrude Bone's first published fiction was Provincial Tales in 1904, which was published with a frontispiece by Muirhead Bone. The book consisted ten short stories which the preface explained would "illustrate the colorful language of working people, untainted by education." The author D.H. Lawrence mentioned reading the first two stories, "Poverty" and "The Right Eye," in a letter on 12 January 1921. He had modest praise for her writing:

I like the first two stories of Gertrude Bone immensely -- she is wonderfully perceptive there. She's got a lot of poetic feeling, a lot of perceptivity, but she seems scarcely able to concentrate it on her people she is studying: at least, not always."

The first of her three novels was Women of the Country, published in 1913. The novel follows an unmarried, middle-aged cottager, Ann Hilton, who visits the other women in her country village to give them advice. Ann Hilton takes particular interest in a farm girl, Jane Evans, who is seduced and made pregnant by the local squire and dies in the local infirmary. The Oxford Companion to Edwardian fiction describes it as "a gentle, meticulously observed story ... notable for its decisive but unsensational focus on the experience of women: the male characters have walk-on parts only." Virginia Woolf wrote a review of the novel for the Times Literary Supplement on 10 July 1913, praising its realistic portrayal of the brutality and profundity of rural living:

These are pictures of an impressionist--that is to say, it is left to us to make a body for a few vivid words, but Mrs Bone's skill is indisputable. She never allows us to forget that there is much beauty even in a plain country, but the great merit of her book is that, without shirking either the plainness or the meanness, she yet makes us feel the fine quality of the human nature which persists in its life, in spite of everything.

Gertrude Bone also collaborated with her husband and her son Stephen for several books which combined writing and illustration. The book Of the Western Isles, which Stephen illustrated, won a gold medal at the 1925 Paris Universal Exhibition. In 1936, Gertrude and Muirhead Bone published Old Spain, a two-volume collection of Muirhead's watercolors accompanied by text written by Gertrude. This book was considered popular and the initial print run of two hundred and fifty copies, numbered and signed by the artists and the author, was reprinted as Days in Old Spain in 1939 and 1942.
