= Quentin Bone =

British marine biologist (1931–2021)

- Born: 17 August 1931; Hampstead, London, England
- Died: 6 July 2021 (aged 89)
- Education: St John's College (1951); Magdalen College (1958)
- Occupation: Marine biologist
- Known for: Electron microscopy applied to marine life
- Title: Fellow of the Royal Society (since 1984)
- Spouse: Susan Elizabeth (née Smith)
- Parents: Stephen Bone (father); Mary Adshead (mother)
- Awards: Zoological Medal of the Linnean Society of London (1999); Frink Medal from the Zoological Society of London (2003)

Quentin Bone FRS (17 August 1931 – 6 July 2021) was a British marine biologist. In 1971, he pioneered the application of electron microscopy to marine life.

== Biography ==
Quentin Bone was the son of Stephen Bone, a painter, writer, broadcaster and war artist, and Mary Adshead, a painter, muralist, illustrator and designer. Educated first at Warwick School, he received his degree in zoology in 1951 from St John's College, Oxford. He became a doctor of philosophy in 1958 from Magdalen College, Oxford.

In 1984, Quentin Bone became a fellow of the Royal Society.

Quentin Bone married Susan Elizabeth Smith (1958). They have 4 sons.

== Research ==
Quentin Bone worked on the histological studies of the fine structure and physiology of aquatic invertebrates and fish. In 1971, he pioneered the use of electron microscopy applied to marine life when he took the first electron micrograph at the Marine Biological Association of the United Kingdom. He unveiled many histological fundamentals regarding life facilitation in aqueous environments.

== Other roles ==
- 1959-1994: Member of the Marine Biological Association of the United Kingdom
- Since 1989: Member of the Institut océanographique (comité de perfectionnement)
- Since 1994: Honorary research fellow of the Marine Biological Association of the United Kingdom

== Publications ==
- N B Marshall; J S Blaxter (1994). Biology of Fishes. Blackie. ISBN 978-0-7514-0243-8.; Taylor & Francis, with R Moore, 2007, ISBN 978-0-415-37562-7
- Biology of Pelagic Tunicates Oxford University Press, 1998, ISBN 978-0-19-854024-3

== Prizes ==
- 1999: Linnean Medal
- 2003: Frink Medal from the Zoological Society of London
