= Stephen Bone =

English painter (1904-1958)

- Born: 13 November 1904; Chiswick, London, England
- Died: 15 September 1958 (aged 53); London
- Education: Slade School of Fine Art
- Known for: Painting, drawing
- Spouse: Mary Adshead
- Children: 3, including Quentin Bone

Stephen Bone (13 November 1904 – 15 September 1958) was an English painter, writer, broadcaster and noted war artist. Bone achieved early success in book illustration using woodcuts before he turned to painting and art criticism.

== Early life ==
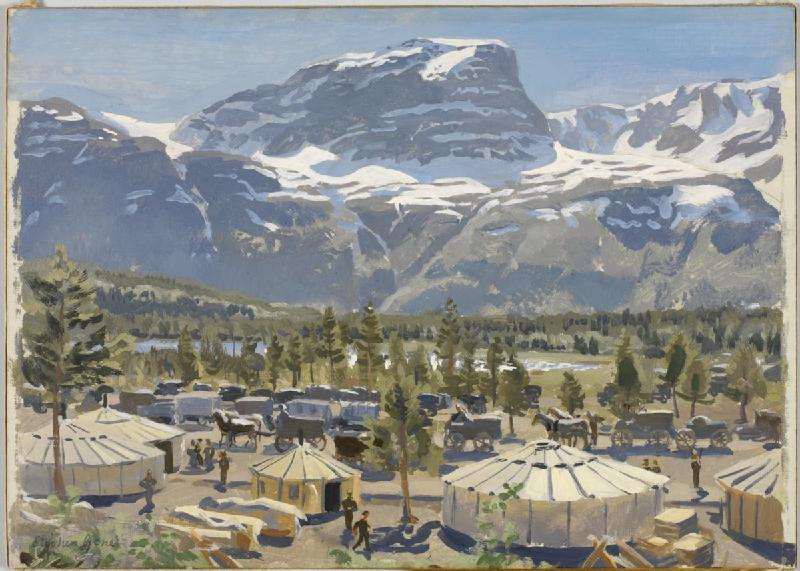
A British Camp near Skibotn, Norway (Art.IWM ARTLD 5336)

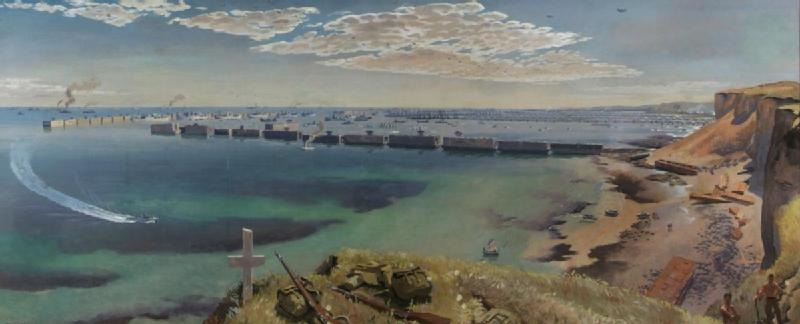
Mulberry Harbour, Normandy (Art.IWM ARTLD 5445)

Stephen Bone was born in Chiswick in west London, the son of Sir Muirhead Bone, an artist, and Gertrude Helena Dodd, a writer. After leaving Bedales School, he travelled widely in Europe with his father before enrolling at the Slade School of Fine Art in 1922. Bone became disillusioned with the Slade; he left in 1924 to begin illustrating books with woodcuts for his mother and other writers. In 1925, he was awarded the gold medal for Wood Engraving at the International Exhibition in Paris. In 1926, he was the subject of a joint exhibition at the Goupil Gallery, alongside Rodney Joseph Burn and Robin Guthrie, and in 1928 he painted a mural for the underground station at Piccadilly Circus.

In 1929, Bone married the artist Mary Adshead, and they were to have two sons and a daughter. The couple travelled extensively across Britain and Europe, which allowed Bone to paint outdoors in all weathers and to develop a style of bright landscape painting that proved popular and sold well at a number of gallery exhibitions.

During the 1930s, Bone exhibited at the Fine Art Society, at the Leferve Gallery, the Redfern Gallery and in 1936 exhibited a series of 41 paintings of British counties at the Ryman Gallery in Oxford. During 1936 and 1937, he painted and exhibited in Stockholm.

== World War II ==
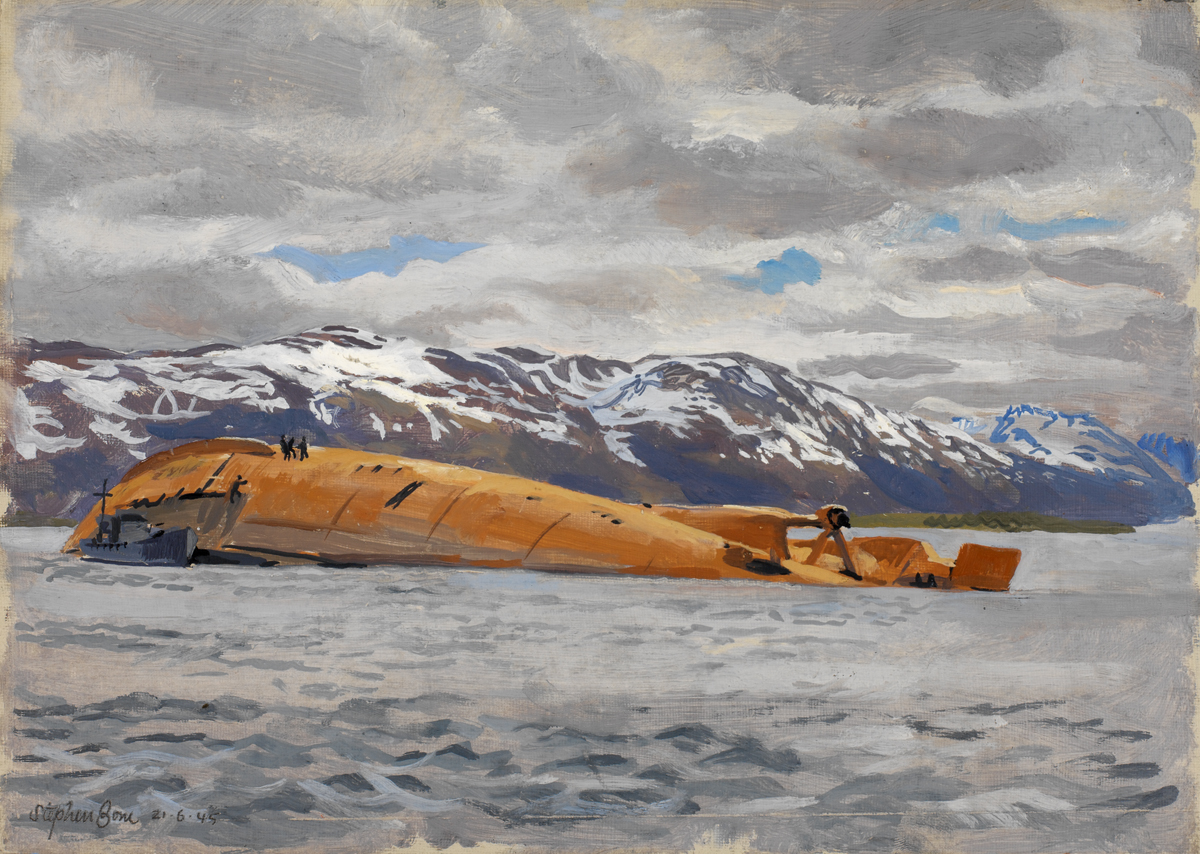
The Wreck of the Tirpitz, June 1945 (ART IWM LD 5441)

At the outbreak of the Second World War, Bone enlisted as an officer in the Civil Defence Camouflage Establishment based in Leamington Spa. In June 1943, Bone was appointed by the War Artists' Advisory Committee to be a full-time salaried artist to the Ministry of Information specialising in Admiralty subjects. The post had originally being held by Stephen's father, Muirhead Bone, but following the death of Gavin Bone, Stephen's brother, Muirhead decided not to continue with the commission. Stephen produced a large quantity of works around Great Britain, showing coastal installations and naval craft, including several works painted on-board submarines. He witnessed and sketched the 1944 Normandy landings, painted scenes in Caen and Courseulles after the invasion, and went on to record the assault on Walcheren Island in the Netherlands. Toward the end of 1945, he travelled to Norway and painted the wreck of the Tirpitz. In Norway, he also recorded captured naval bases and observed a number of mass graves of, mostly, Soviet prisoners of war.

== Later life ==
After the war, Bone found his style of painting somewhat out of fashion and, although he continued to paint, he found it difficult to get his work exhibited. He became an art critic for the Manchester Guardian, wrote humorous pieces for the Glasgow Herald and did television and radio work for the BBC. With his wife, he wrote and illustrated children's books. Together they organised a mural painting course at Dartington. In 1957, Bone was appointed the director of the Hornsey College of Art. He died of cancer on 15 September 1958 at St Bartholomew's Hospital, London.

== Selected bibliography ==
- 1921: Mr Paul (Jonathan Cape), a novel by Gertrude Bone, woodcuts by Stephen Bone, OCLC 965634
- 1921: The Furrowed Earth (Chatto & Windus), by Gertrude Bone with woodcuts by Stephen Bone
- 1922: A Farmers' Life (Cape), by G. Bourne, illustrated by Stephen Bone
- 1923: Selected Poems (Cape), by W. H. Davis, illustrated by Stephen Bone
- 1924: Oasis (Cape), with Gertrude Bone
- 1925: Of the Western Isles (T. N. Foulis), "forty woodcuts by Stephen Bone, with letterpress by Gertrude Bone",
- 1928: The Hidden Orchis (London: Medici Society), with Gertrude Bone
- 1930: The Cope (Medici), with Gertrude Bone
- 1936: The Little Boy and His House (J. M. Dent), children's picture book by Bone and Mary Adshead, OCLC 70299772
- 1937: The West Coast of Scotland, Skye to Oban (Batsford); later issued by Faber as a Shell Guide
- 1939: Albion: an Artist's Britain (A. & C. Black)
- 1942: The Silly Snail and Other Stories (Dent), Bone and Adshead
- 1946: British Weather, Britain in Pictures no. 97 (Collins)
- 1948: The Military Orchid, (Bodley Head), by J.Brooke, illustrated by Stephen Bone
- 1951: The English and Their Country (Longmans, Green), Stephen Bone with illustrations by Muirhead Bone, OCLC 559578913
- 1953: The Little Boys and Their Boats (Dent), Bone and Adshead, OCLC 767530555
