= David Bone =

Commodore and author (1874–1959)

Sir David William Bone CBE (22 June 1874 – 17 May 1959) was a Scottish Commodore and author of nautical fiction. His work includes The Brassbounder about a brassbounder, a young apprentice on a British Merchant ship. It was included as a recommendation in Literary Taste: How to Form It, a long essay with recommended readings written by Arnold Bennett. Brassbounder is "a classic of the squaresail era".

Bone received the Coronation Medal from King George VI in 1937 for his long association with the Merchant Navy. He was appointed a CBE in 1943 and awarded a knighthood in 1946.

Bone was born in Abbotsford Place in Glasgow, Scotland. His father, David Drummond Bone (1841–1911) was a prominent newspaper publisher in Glasgow and his great-grandfather was a boyhood companion of Robert Burns. Elizabeth Millar Crawford (1847–1886) was his mother. His brothers included the journalist James Bone and artist Muirhead Bone who illustrated some of David's books, including Merchantmen-at-Arms. Bone studied at Partick Academy.

Bone's career at sea began when he apprenticed at 15 on the City of Florence, "an old-time square-rigger". He also served on windjammers in Australia, with Anchor Line, and on a troop ship during the Boer War. Bone captained the SS Tuscania from New York on its first trip to Glasgow. Merchantman Rearmed describes his experiences during World War II, including the Allied invasion of Sicily.

== Bibliography ==
- The Brassbounder (1910) by David W Bone
- Broken Stowage by David W Bone (1915), a collection of short stories
- Merchantmen-at-arms; the British merchants' service in the war by David W Bone (1919)
- The Lookoutman by David W Bone (1923)
- Capstan Bars by David W Bone (1931)
- Merchantman Rearmed (1949)
- The Queerfella by David W Bone (1952)
- Landfall at Sunset; the life of a contented sailor by David W Bone (1955)
