= Ernest Brooks (photographer) =

British photographer (1876–1957)

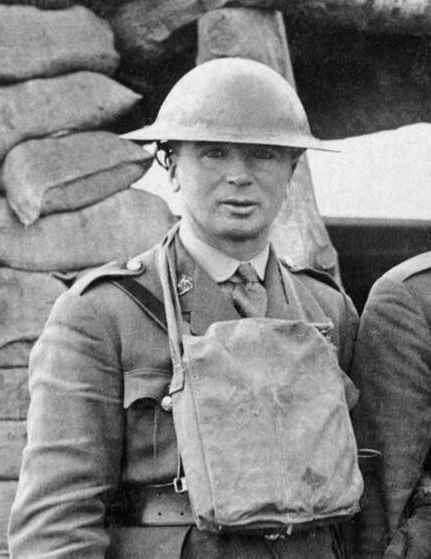
- Brooks c. 1917
- Born: 23 February 1876; Draycott Moor, Faringdon, England
- Died: 1957 (aged 80–81); Hendon, England
- Occupation: Photographer
- Employers: British royal family; British Military
- Known for: First British war photographer, produced 10% of British World War I images
- Children: 2
- Awards: Order of the Crown (Belgium); Croix de Guerre

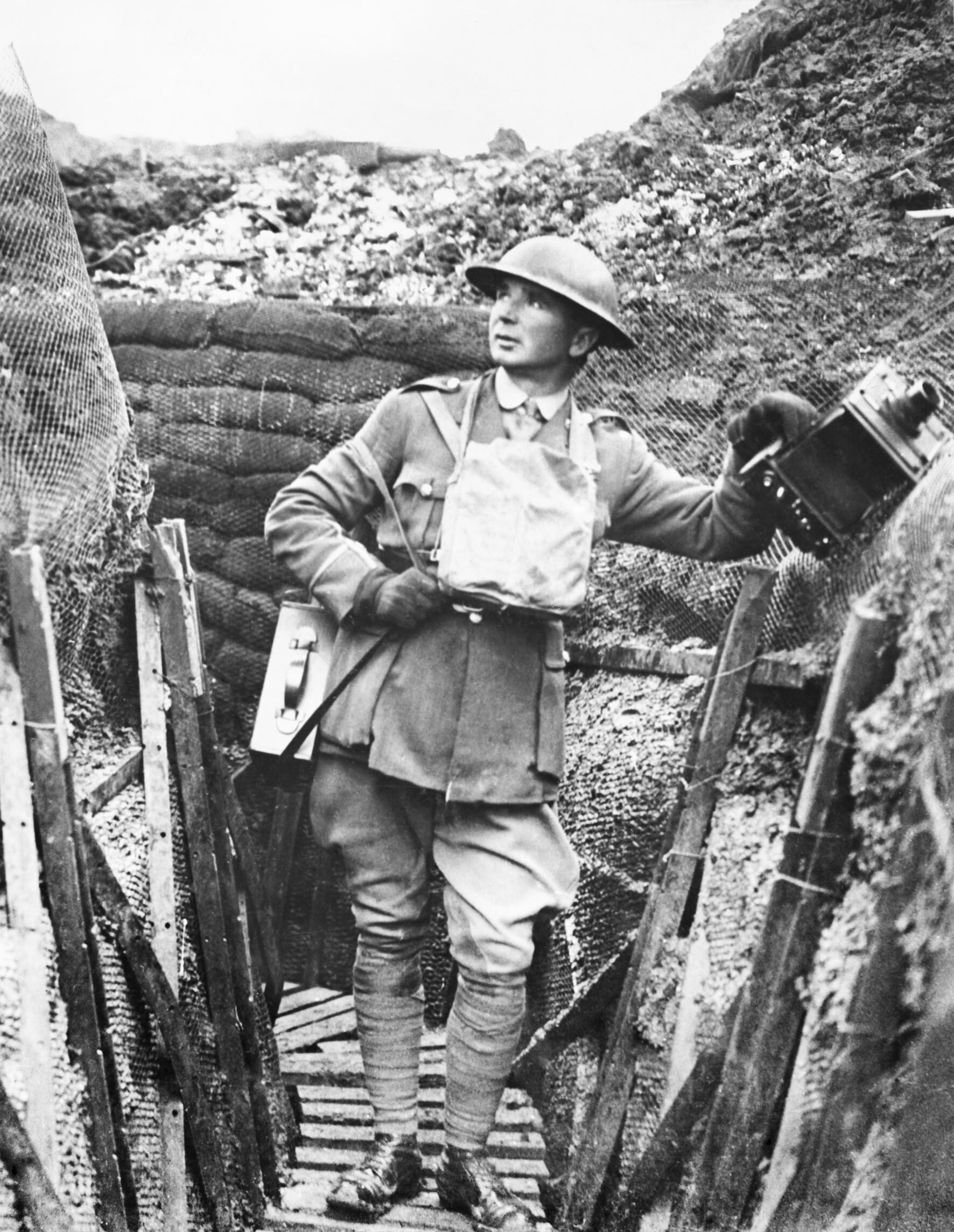
Brooks on the Western Front, 1917

Ernest Brooks (23 February 1876 – 1957) was a British photographer, best known for his war photography from the First World War. He was the first official photographer to be appointed by the British military, and produced several thousand images between 1915 and 1918, more than a tenth of all British official photographs taken during the war. His work was often posed and formal, but several of his less conventional images are marked by a distinctive use of silhouette. Before and immediately after the war he worked as an official photographer to the Royal Family, but was dismissed from this appointment and stripped of his official honours in 1925, for reasons that were not officially made public.

== Early life ==
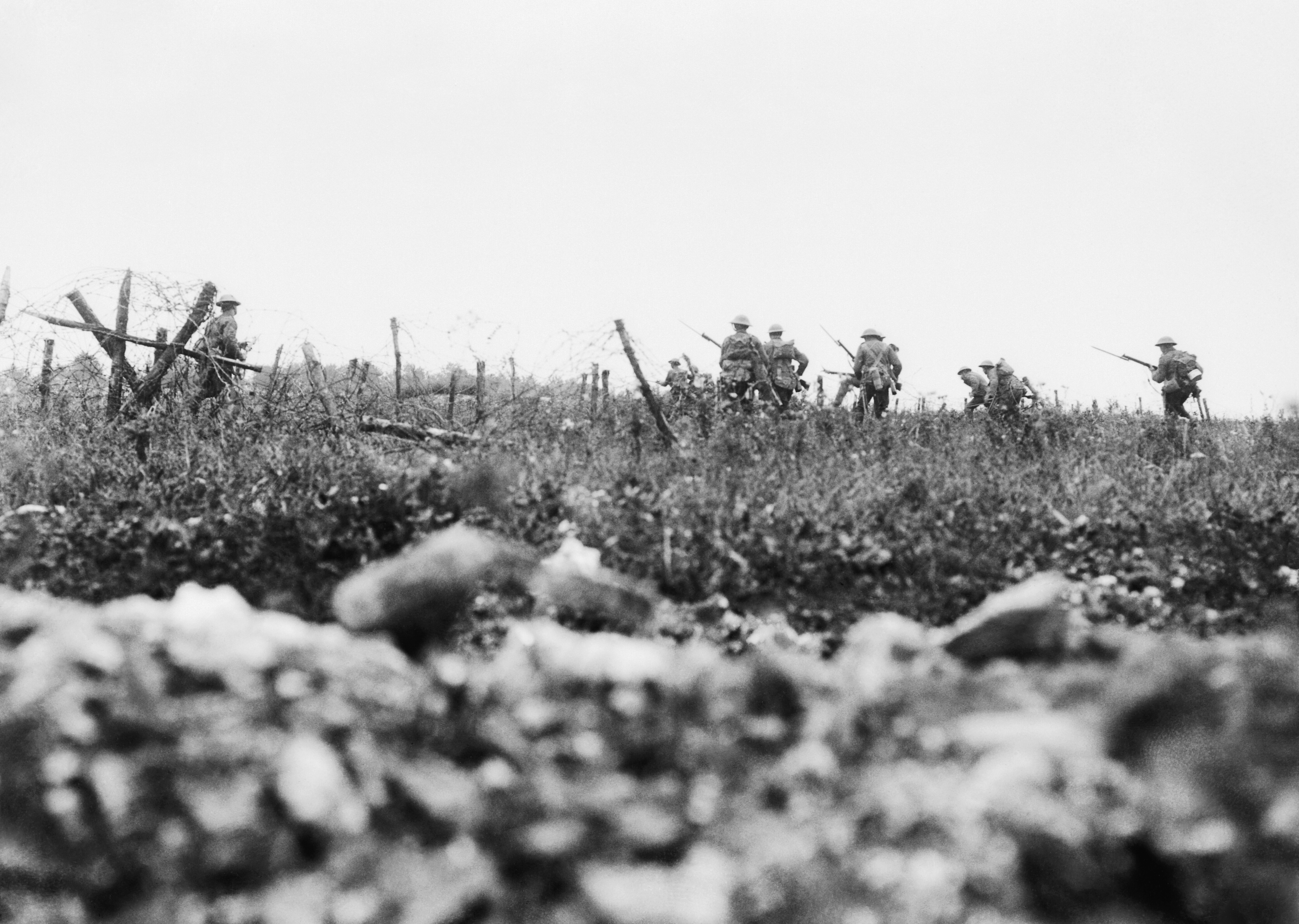
A front-line combat photograph: soldiers of the Wiltshire Regiment going "over the top" on 7 August 1916, during the Battle of the Somme.

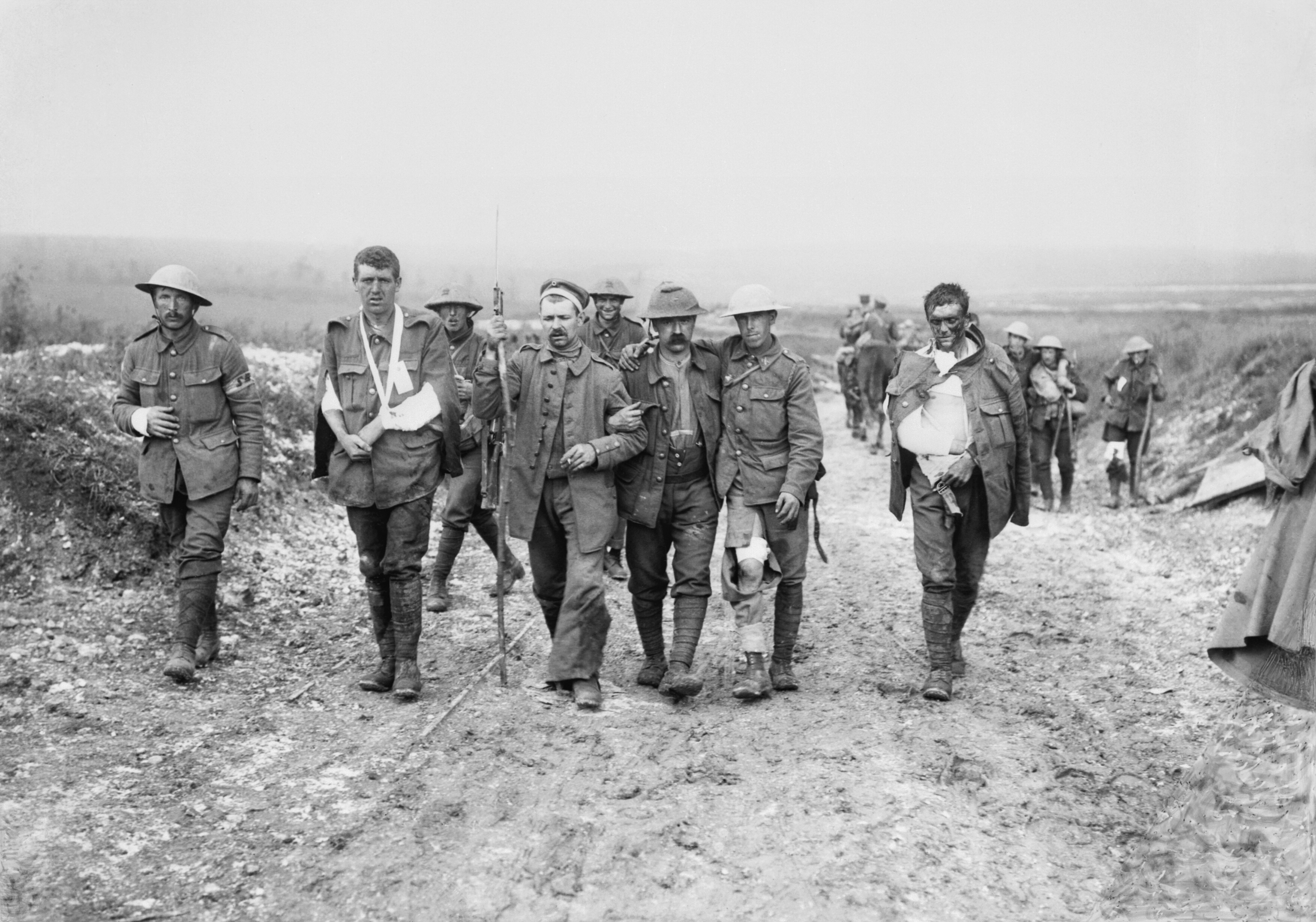
Wounded British soldiers and German prisoners heading to the rear during the Battle of Bazentin Ridge (part of the battle of the Somme), 19 July 1916.

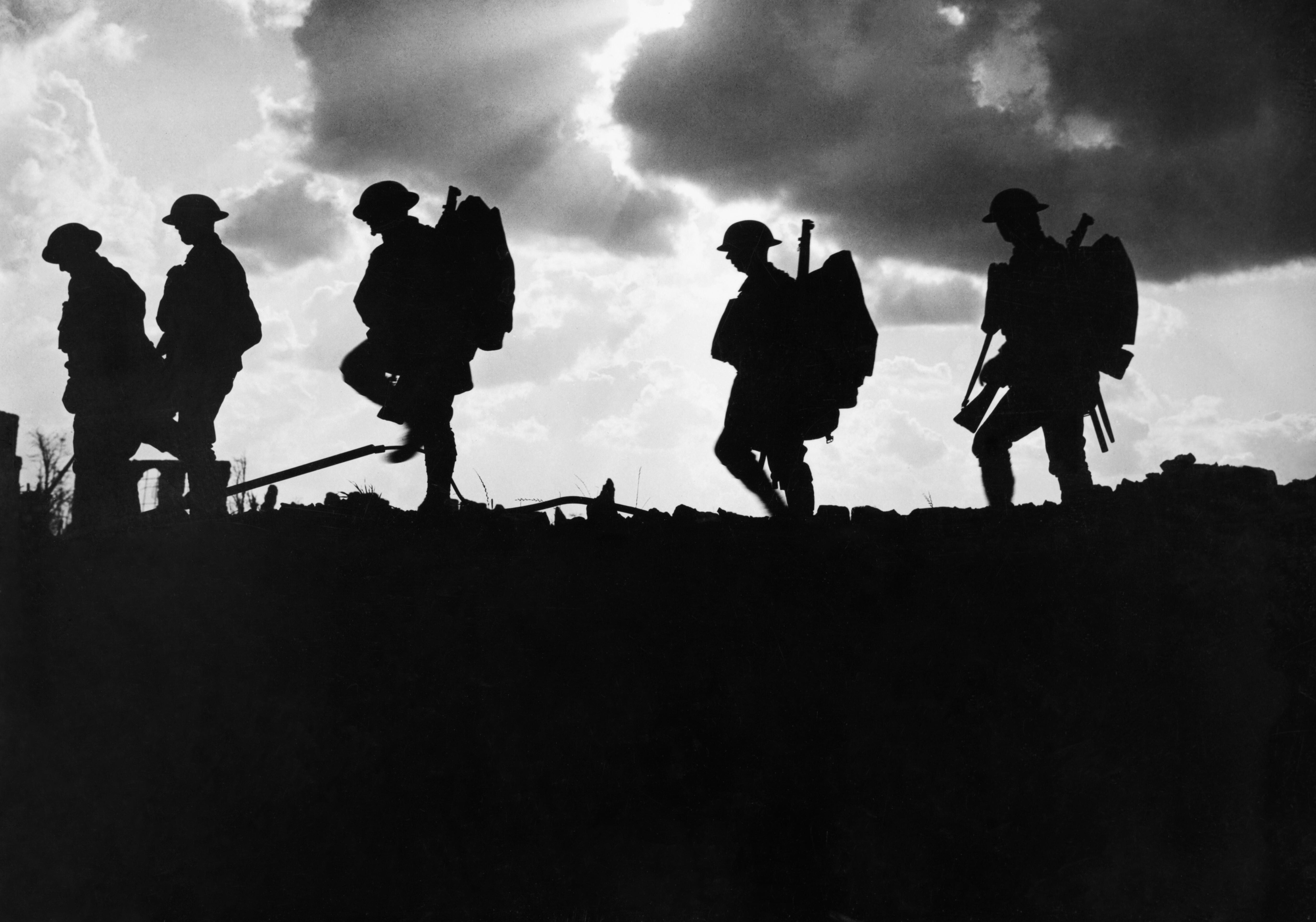
Image taken by Brooks during the Battle of Broodseinde, showing a group of soldiers of the 8th East Yorkshire Regiment moving up to the front, silhouetted against the skyline.

Brooks was born on 23 February 1876 at Draycott Moor near Faringdon, the son of a farm labourer. He grew up near Windsor, Berkshire, where his father afterwards worked in the Great Park, and as a child frequently encountered members of the Royal Family.

After leaving school in 1890, he worked as a boy on the estates, where one of his duties was to look after a mule given to Queen Victoria by Lord Kitchener. In 1892 he enlisted in the 3rd Dragoon Guards, and after leaving the army joined the Glamorganshire Yeomanry as a volunteer.

== Career ==
His first encounter with photography came after he took a position in the household of Lady Vivian, widow of Hussey Vivian, 3rd Baron Vivian; Lady Vivian's twin daughters each had a camera, and Brooks was entrusted with developing the films. Paying by weekly shilling installments, he bought a camera himself which he used to take pictures of prominent people for publication; his first portrait was sold to several newspapers through an agency, earning him seven guineas.

Realising that he could support himself on this income, Brooks left Lady Vivian's employment, and returned to Windsor. Here, he worked as a freelance newspaper photographer, using his contacts within the royal household to arrange access to his subjects. After a short period, he became an official photographer to the Royal Family. In 1906 he accompanied Princess Ena to Spain for her marriage to King Alfonso XIII, where he took the first formal portrait of the couple before their wedding.

Brooks' photographs were published in numerous newspapers including the Daily Mirror, and the Manchester Guardian; as his contract with the Royal Family prevented him from selling exclusive rights. Each photograph sold for around 10s 6d.

In late 1910, he accompanied the Duke of Connaught to South Africa, and the next year went with King George V to India for the Delhi Durbar, where he had the opportunity to photograph the King on a tiger hunt as well as in more formal contexts. After returning from India he left the royal household to open a studio on Buckingham Palace Road in central London, meanwhile continuing to describe himself as the Official Photographer to the King and Queen.

=== World War I ===
Ernest Brooks took the photo of Mary, Princess Royal and Countess of Harewood included as a cigarette card with the Princess Mary's Christmas gift. One of his photos was also used as the basis for the image Mary on the box included with the gift.

After the outbreak of the First World War he served in the Royal Naval Volunteer Reserve, enlisting on 25 January 1915. When the Gallipoli landings were being prepared, Winston Churchill (then First Lord of the Admiralty), who had himself been a war correspondent, arranged for there to be journalists and photographers accompanying the expeditionary force. Brooks, as a professional photographer already in uniform, was appointed as the Admiralty official photographer. In March 1916, he was transferred from the Admiralty to the War Office, given the honorary rank of second lieutenant and appointed the official photographer for the Western Front.

He was the only professional photographer to cover the Battle of the Somme, recording the attack on the first day from the front-line trenches near Beaumont Hamel. In 1917 he was appointed a Chevalier of the Belgian Order of the Crown. In 1918, he covered the Italian campaign and naval activity. The same year, he was awarded the French Croix de Guerre.

=== After the war ===
He later returned to royal service, accompanying the Prince of Wales on his tour of Canada and the United States in 1919, and Australia in 1920. The American leg of the tour posed problems with people trying to capitalise on the Prince's appearance for publicity purposes; one prominent actress, Mildred Harris Chaplin, passed herself off as the niece of a local dignitary in order to be photographed, whilst another offered Brooks a bribe of a thousand dollars to arrange a picture. Brooks admitted that he "nearly gave in", but backed out at the last minute for fear of offending the Prince. He was less successful in avoiding offence with another photograph, this time of the Prince in his bath during the voyage. After it was published, George V called it inappropriate and Brooks was reprimanded.

For reasons that were not publicly disclosed, in May 1925 his appointment as a royal photographer was cancelled and his appointment as Officer of the Order of the British Empire (OBE) and his British Empire Medal (BEM) were "cancelled and annulled". This was widely reported in the British press without commentary other than noting who Brooks was; no newspaper gave any further details. It is likely that it was connected to his arrest and conviction for "insulting behaviour" to a young woman at an international hockey match in April; he was fined £8 and told that he had narrowly escaped imprisonment. Later that year, after his fall from grace, he published a series of articles in the American McClure's Magazine, "Kings, Princes, Governors", which gave "intimate anecdotes" of the royal court. An American newspaper speculated that his downfall was connected to another indiscreet photograph of the Prince of Wales, showing the Prince dressed in a woman's kimono and wig after appearing in a play; however, this photograph was taken and published in October, during the Prince's return from a trip to South America, well after Brooks had departed.

In 1926, he filed for bankruptcy. However, he continued to work as a photographer; in 1928, he was convicted of disorderly behaviour outside a ball in Grosvenor Square, after claiming that he was acquainted with the hostess and that had been invited there to take pictures. His photojournalism career lasted at least as late as 1936, when he is credited with taking two photographs of Jerome Brannigan being arrested, after Brannigan had reportedly attempted to assassinate King Edward VIII at the Trooping the Colour ceremony. By the time of the 1939 National Register, he was living in Clapham with his wife and two daughters, and listed his occupation as "unemployed press photographer".

Brooks later moved with his wife to Golders Green, where they lived on a small income. At the age of 82, in 1956, he pled guilty to stealing a purse in the dining room of the Victoria and Albert Museum, and was given a conditional discharge; the arresting officer described him as "very hard up" with "a distinguished record as a photographer". He died in 1957.

== Style and legacy ==
Much of his wartime work, though technically proficient and consistent, was rather conventional, often involving posed photographs rather than more candid impromptu shots of his subjects. His work was noted as being characterised by a "conscious seeking after a publishable photograph", and it was recorded that he occasionally persuaded soldiers to pose for staged pictures of routine activity in the trenches. However, he was insistent that combat photographs were never faked – "we have strict instructions not to do – we have never done it". He had a fondness for a dramatic use of silhouette, with images composed to show soldiers walking along a ridge against the light. These images, where individual men were not easily recognisable, often were used to illustrate the "anonymous heroes" of the war.

Brooks was the first and the longest-serving of the British war photographers, and took more than 4,400 images. This was the most of any individual photographer, and represented more than 10% of all the official photographs. A large collection of his photographs is now held by the Imperial War Museum, and a second collection is held by the National Library of Scotland as part of Earl Haig's papers; both have been digitised.

Several formal images from his pre-war service with the Royal Family are held by the National Portrait Gallery, including several from the Delhi Durbar as well as a portrait of Prince Arthur of Connaught and Princess Alexandra, taken at their wedding. There are also two portraits of the young Prince John, both in 1913.

== Sources ==
- Bourne, J.M. (2001). Who's who in World War One. Routledge. ISBN 0-415-14179-6.
- Brooks, Ernest (September 1921). "The King and the Prince of Wales : some intimate and amusing anecdotes of the Royal Family". The Strand Magazine. Vol. 62, no. 362. pp. 204–213.
- Carmichael, Jane (1989). First World War photographers. Routledge. ISBN 0-415-01009-8.
- Fraser, Alastair H. (2009). "Ghosts on the Somme: New Techniques in the Analysis of Documentary Film". Stand To! (85). Western Front Association. Archived from the original on 5 March 2010.
