= James Bone =

Scottish journalist

James Bone CH
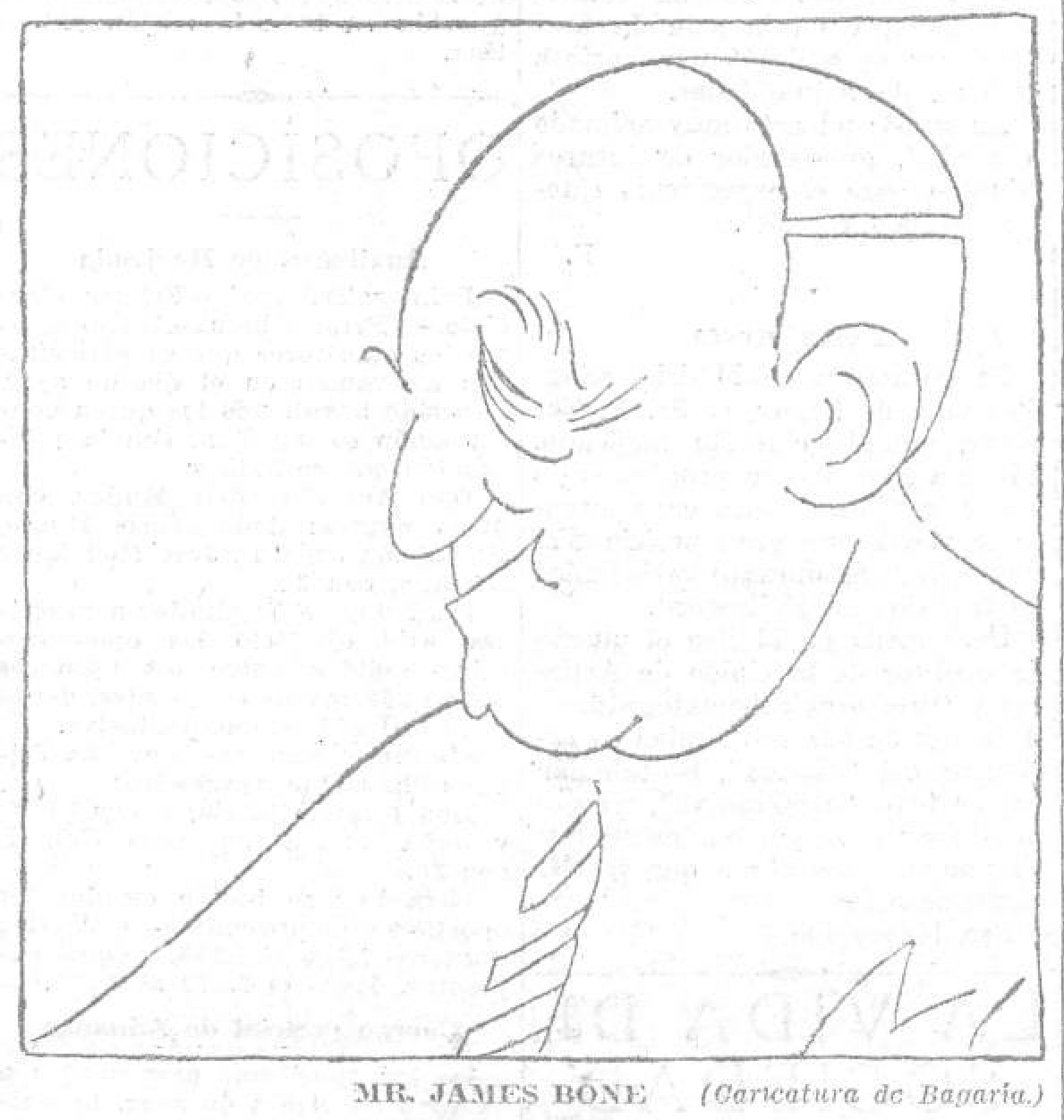
- Caricature by Bagaria (1928)
- Born: 16 May 1872; Glasgow, Scotland
- Died: 23 November 1962 (aged 90)
- Occupation: Journalist
- Spouse: Anne McGavigan (m. 1903; died 1950)
- Relatives: Muirhead Bone (brother); David Bone (brother)

James Bone (16 May 1872 – 23 November 1962) was a British journalist, most notably London correspondent for the Manchester Guardian for 33 years. He was made a Member of the Order of the Companions of Honour in 1947. He was also the primary author of four travel books, one about Glasgow, one about Edinburgh and two about London.

== Family ==
Born in Glasgow, Bone's parents were journalist David Drummond Bone (1851–1911) and his wife, Elizabeth Millar Crawford (1847–1886). His brothers included Sir Muirhead Bone, the artist, and Captain Sir David Bone, author and mariner.

He married Anne McGavigan in 1903; they had no children.

== Early life ==
Bone was a boyhood friend of 'Bard of the Yukon', Robert W. Service, who also was brought up in Glasgow's West End, in Roxburgh Street, while Bone lived close by in Buckingham Terrace.

== Career ==
After leaving school aged 14, Bone worked briefly for the Laird Line, which operated passenger and trade routes between Scotland and Ireland, before joining his father at the North British Daily Mail. When this newspaper was taken over in 1901, he left and temporarily pursued a freelance career, writing reports for the Glasgow Herald, Daily Record, and the Glasgow Evening Times.

Also in 1901, to coincide with the Glasgow International Exhibition (1901), Bone's first book, Glasgow in 1901, was published under the pseudonym, James Hamilton Muir, a name formed from his own name and those of his co-author and friend, Archibald Hamilton Charteris, the nephew of Scottish theologian, Archibald Charteris., and his brother, the book's illustrator, Muirhead Bone.

In 1902 he started work at the London office of the Manchester Guardian, where in 1912, he became the London correspondent, writing a regular column, his London Letter, in which he related events from London in an informal way.

The 3 other books by Bone are : The London Perambulator (1925), illustrated by Muirhead Bone, The Perambulator in Edinburgh (1926), illustrated by E.S.Lumsden, and London Echoing (1948), illustrated by Muirhead Bone.

Bone retired in 1945.

== Later life ==
His wife died in 1950, but Bone lived to see his 90th birthday in 1962, receiving birthday messages from Queen Elizabeth II, President John F. Kennedy, and British Prime Minister Harold Macmillan. He died on 23 November 1962.
