= Princess Mary's Christmas gift =

WWI brass tin containing gifts for armed British forces

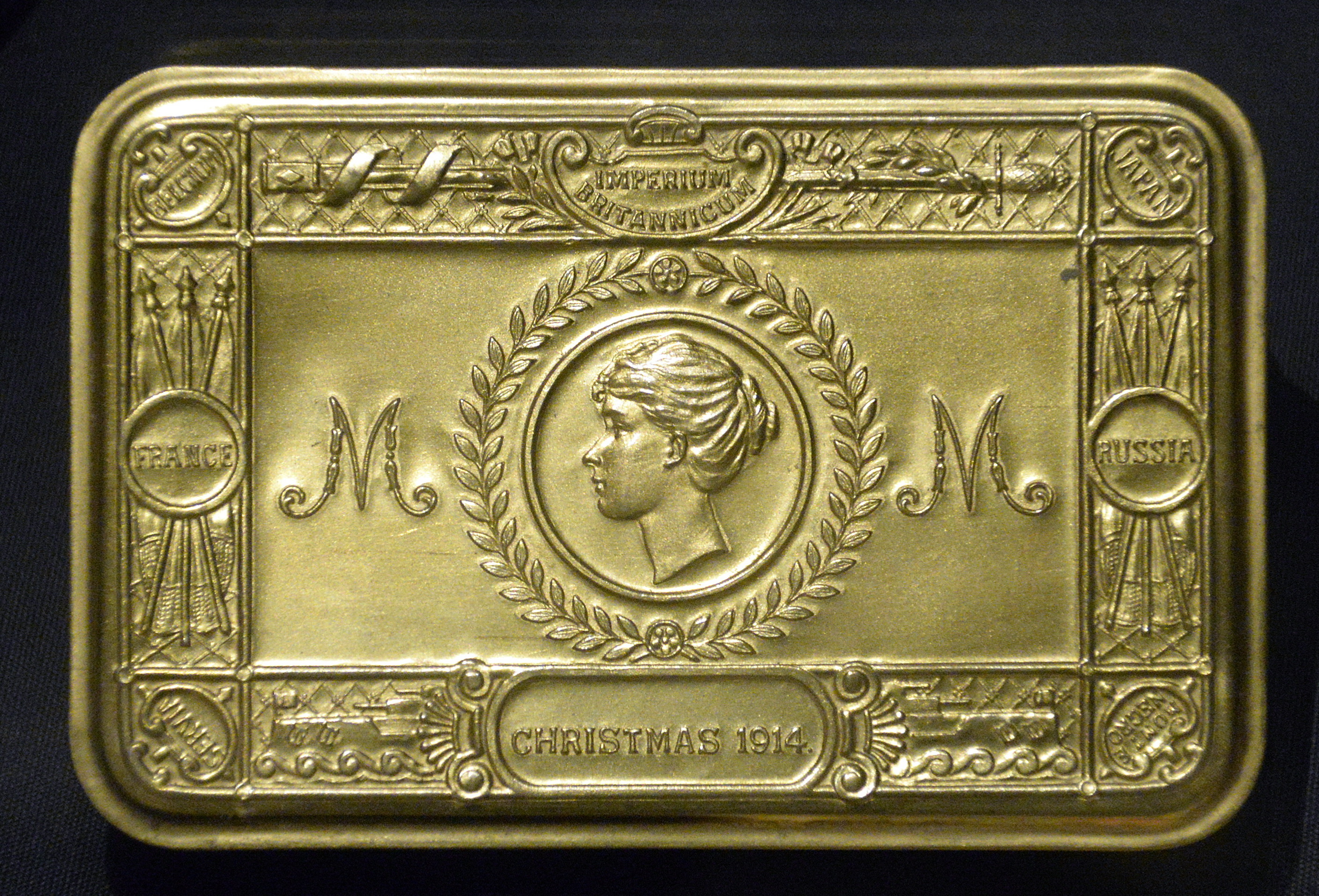
The front of Princess Mary Christmas box.

Princess Mary's Christmas gift was a brass tin containing a number of gifts intended to be distributed to all members of the armed forces of the British Empire at Christmas 1914, during World War I.

== Princess Mary Christmas fund ==
Following the outbreak of the First World War in August 1914, the British Expeditionary Force was sent to the Western Front and was soon joined by troops from the Empire, those from India arriving before the end of the year. On 14 October 1914, George V's 17-year-old daughter, Princess Mary, launched an appeal to fund a Christmas gift for every member of the armed forces. Shortly before Christmas 1914, advertisements were placed in the British press seeking donations for the "Soldiers and Sailors Christmas fund" and £152,691 was soon raised. When the fund was wound up in 1920 the remaining funds were transferred to Queen Mary's Maternity Home.

== The boxes ==
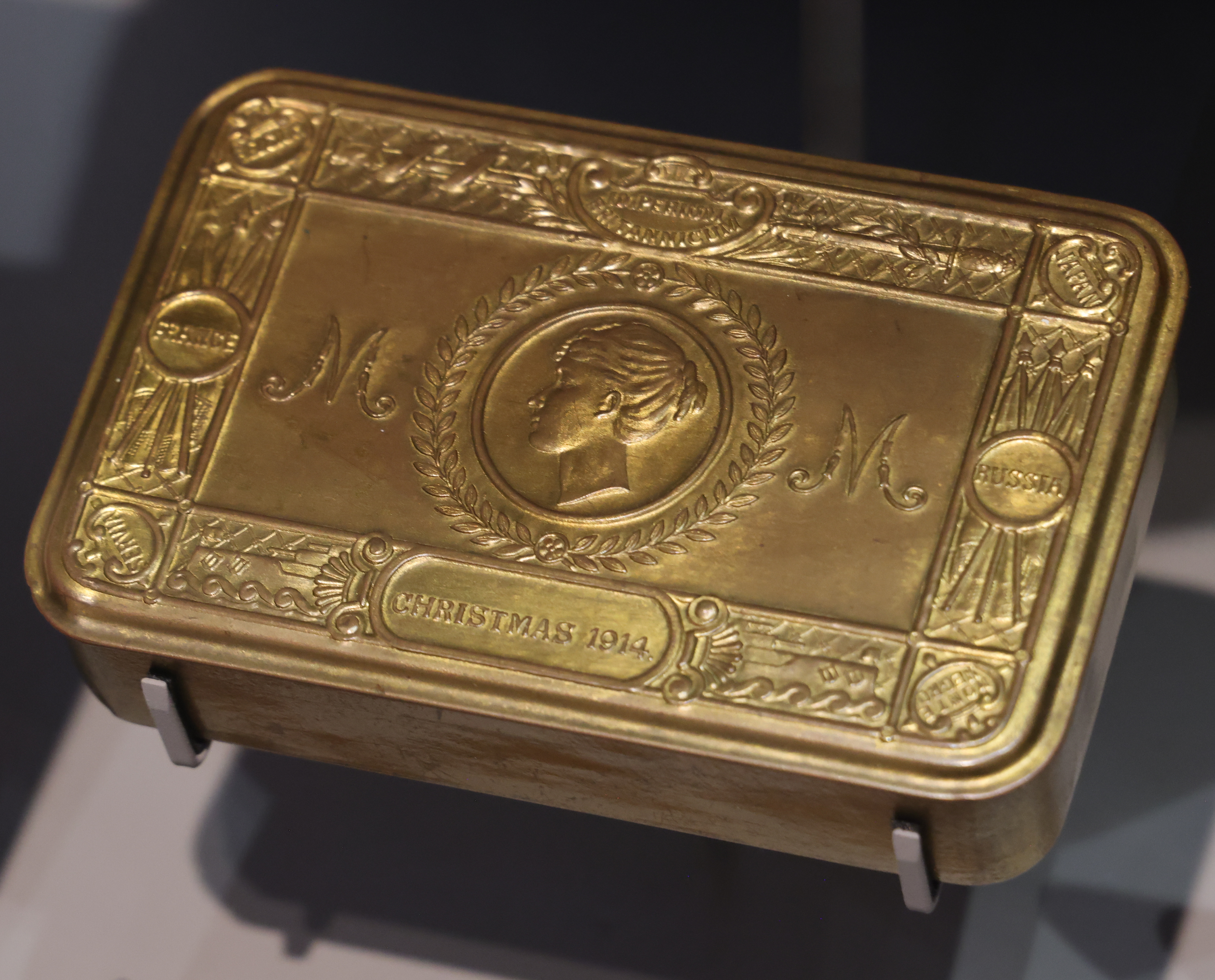
The 1914 Christmas gift box.

The funding was used to manufacture small boxes made of brass; however, due to metal shortages in the later stages of the war some tins were made from plated base metals or alloys. Each tin was decorated with an image of Mary and other military and imperial symbols along with the names of the UK's then allies. The Princess’s “M” monograph appears to either side of her portrait. The design was by Stanley Adshead and Stanley Ramsey. The words "Christmas 1914" appear on a plaque in the bottom centre of the box with space left above them to allow the owner to carve their name.

Obtaining enough brass strip to make the boxes remained a continual problem, a situation not helped when a large consignment from the US was lost due to the sinking of the RMS Lusitania. Not all the items would fit in the brass box, so the collective gift including the brass box was contained and distributed in a cardboard box.

A set of dies used to make the boxes was donated to the Imperial War Museum by Princess Mary.

Reproductions of the box were made in 2014 as part of a newspaper give away.

== The overall gift ==
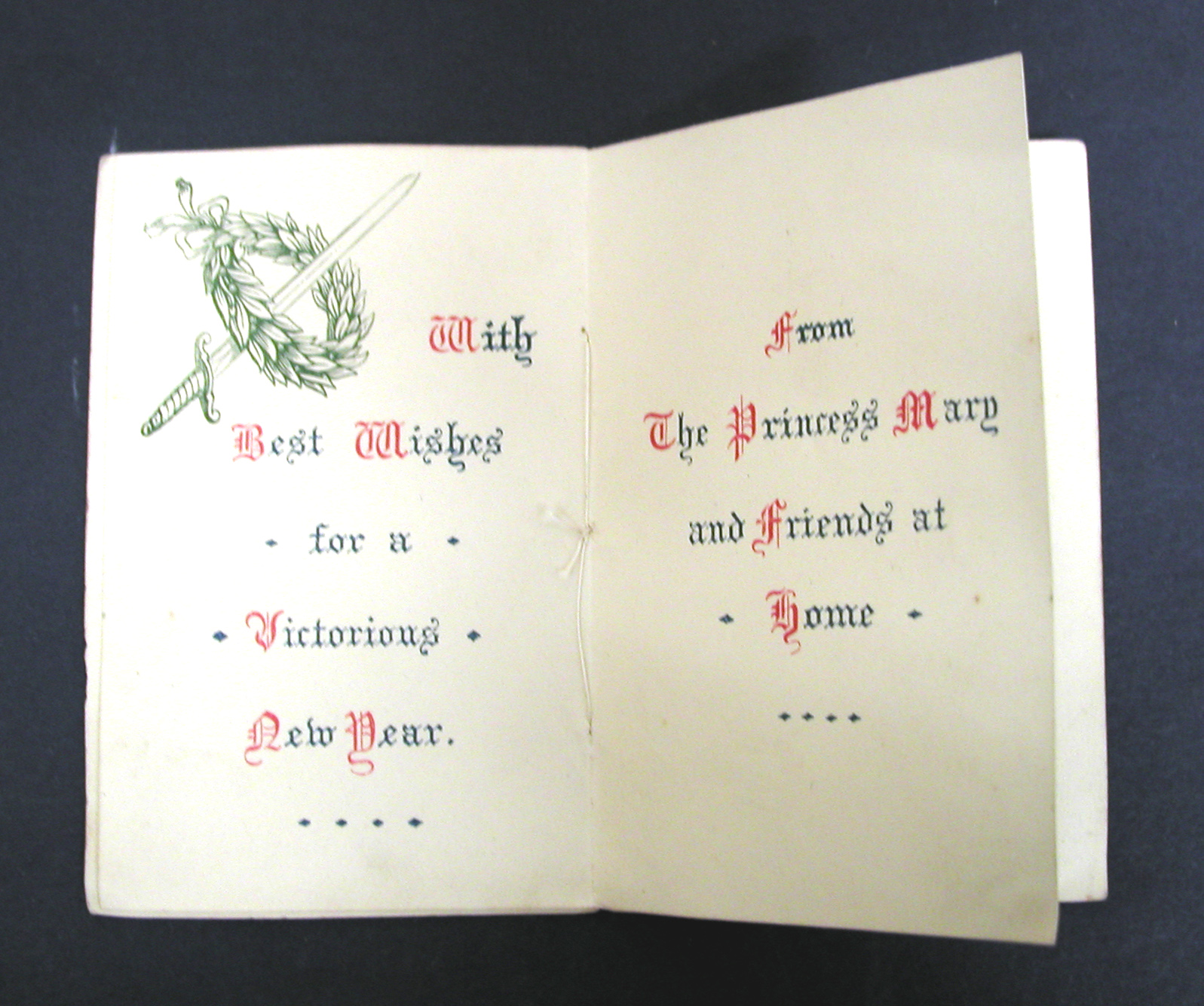
Card included with the gift

The standard gift (referred to as the smokers gift in some post war publications) consisted of the box itself, twenty cigarettes in a yellow monogrammed wrapper, an ounce of pipe tobacco, a pipe, a Christmas card and a photograph of Princess Mary. It was meant to also include a tinder lighter, but a shortage of these meant that in the case of the army they were often substituted with other gifts and those in the navy received a bullet pencil. The bullet pencil consisted of a silver tipped pencil (either sterling silver or nickel silver) in a case made from a spent .303 cartridge recovered from UK firing ranges and marked with an M. The photograph of Princess Mary was in the form of a Cigarette card and was placed within the pack of cigarettes. It was taken by Ernest Brooks.

A non-smokers gift was also produced at a ratio of 1 for every 28 smokers gifts with non smokers making up about 4% of British forces. It consisted of the box, Christmas card and photograph of Princess Mary, but also, instead of smoking related materials it contained a packet of "acid tablets" (a type of sour lemon flavoured sweet) and a khaki writing case with pencil, paper and envelopes.

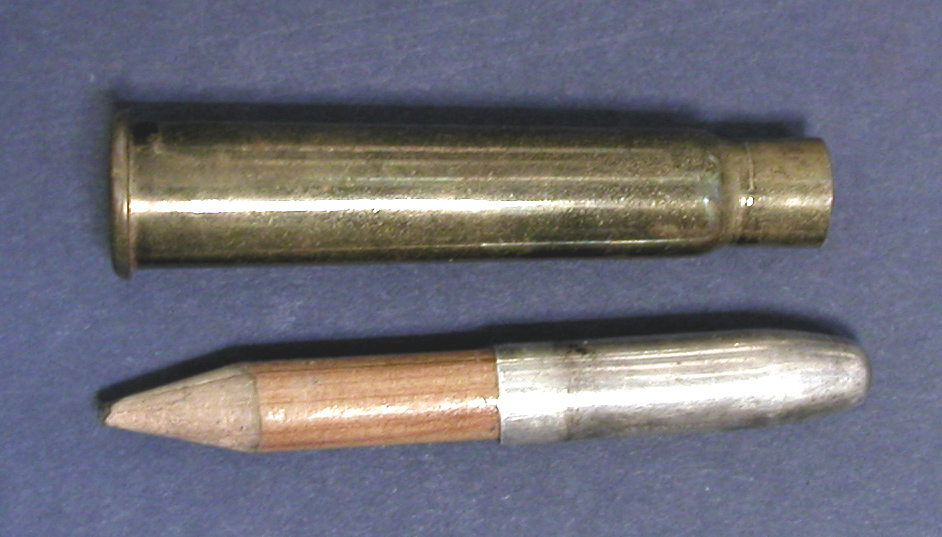
The bullet pencil included with some gifts

Three further gift types were produced for Indian troops. Most Indian troops received the box itself, cigarettes, a tin box of spices, a packet of sugar candy and a Christmas or New Year card. Sikhs got the same without the cigarettes and a third gift for "followers" (Note: Non-combatant personnel, referred to as "followers", served on the Western Front with the British Army of India and performed administrative or other service functions.) consisted of a tin box of spices and a Christmas or New Year card.

A version was also produced for nurses. It consisted of, again, the box itself, a packet of chocolate and the usual Christmas or New Years card.

With the aim of every man at the front and every man on Royal Navy ships getting a gift having been met by 5 January 1915, attention was turned to the remaining forces ultimately under British command (classified as class B and C by the post war final report). For these, it was decided that the gift would consist of the box, a New Year card and a pencil.

== Distribution ==
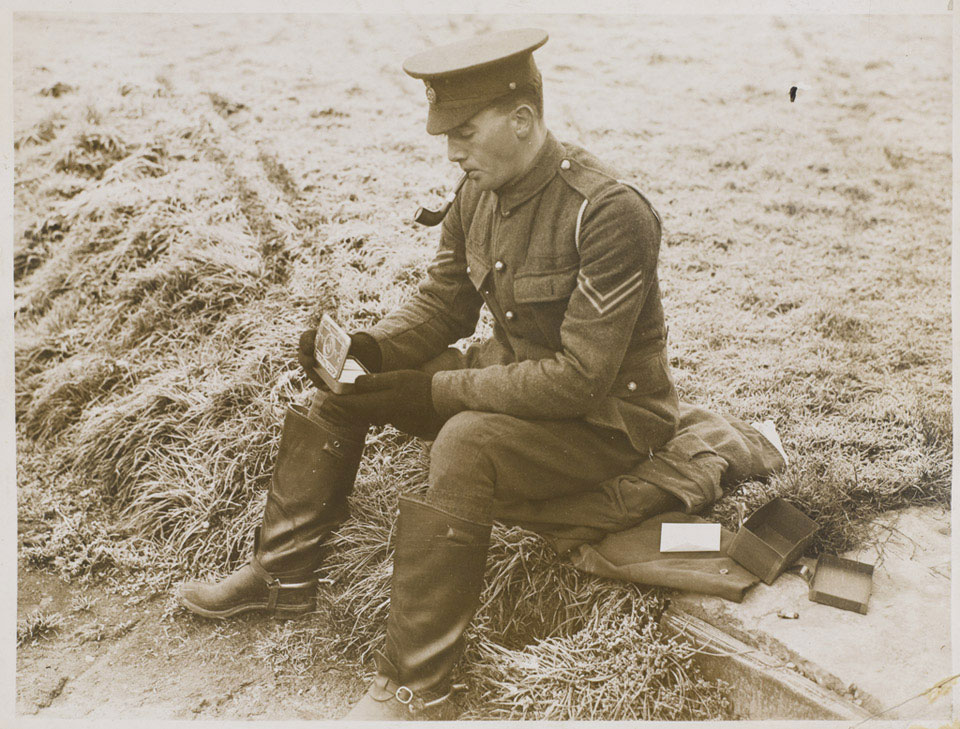
A Corporal of the Army Veterinary Corps opening his Princess Mary Gift on Christmas 1914

The boxes were originally intended for "every sailor afloat and every soldier at the front" on Christmas day 1914, but eligibility was soon extended to everyone "wearing the King's uniform on Christmas day". Whilst around 400,000 were delivered by Christmas, distribution was not completed until 1920, by which time approximately 2.5 million had been delivered. The later deliveries included returning prisoners of war who had to apply to receive their gift. Gifts were set aside for prisoners of war but the decay of the tobacco and a certain amount of theft meant that more had to be purchased in order to refresh them.
