= St Peter's Church, Vauxhall =

Church in Vauxhall, London, England

Coordinates: 51.486777°N 0.118659°W

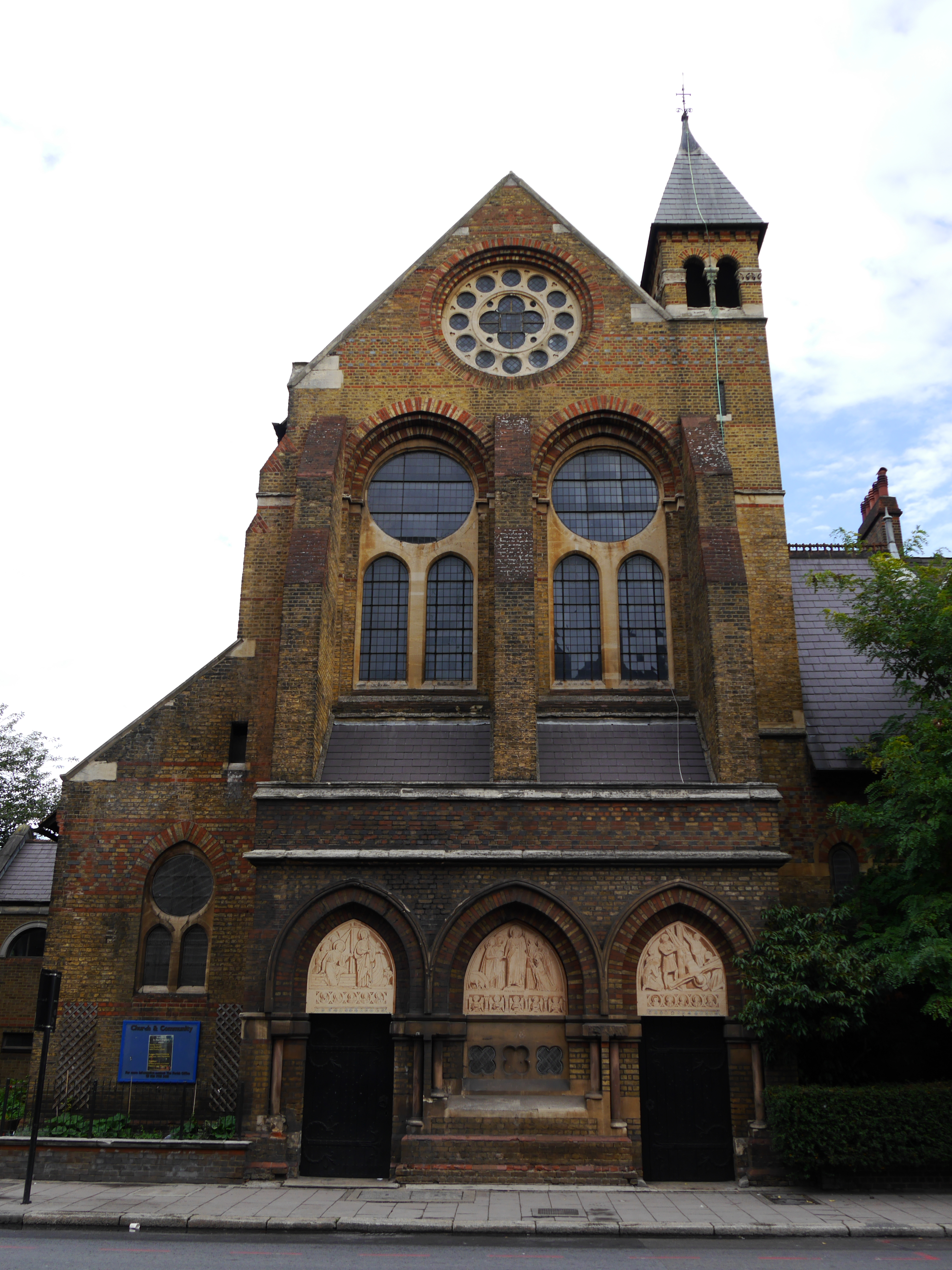
St Peter's, Vauxhall, 2014

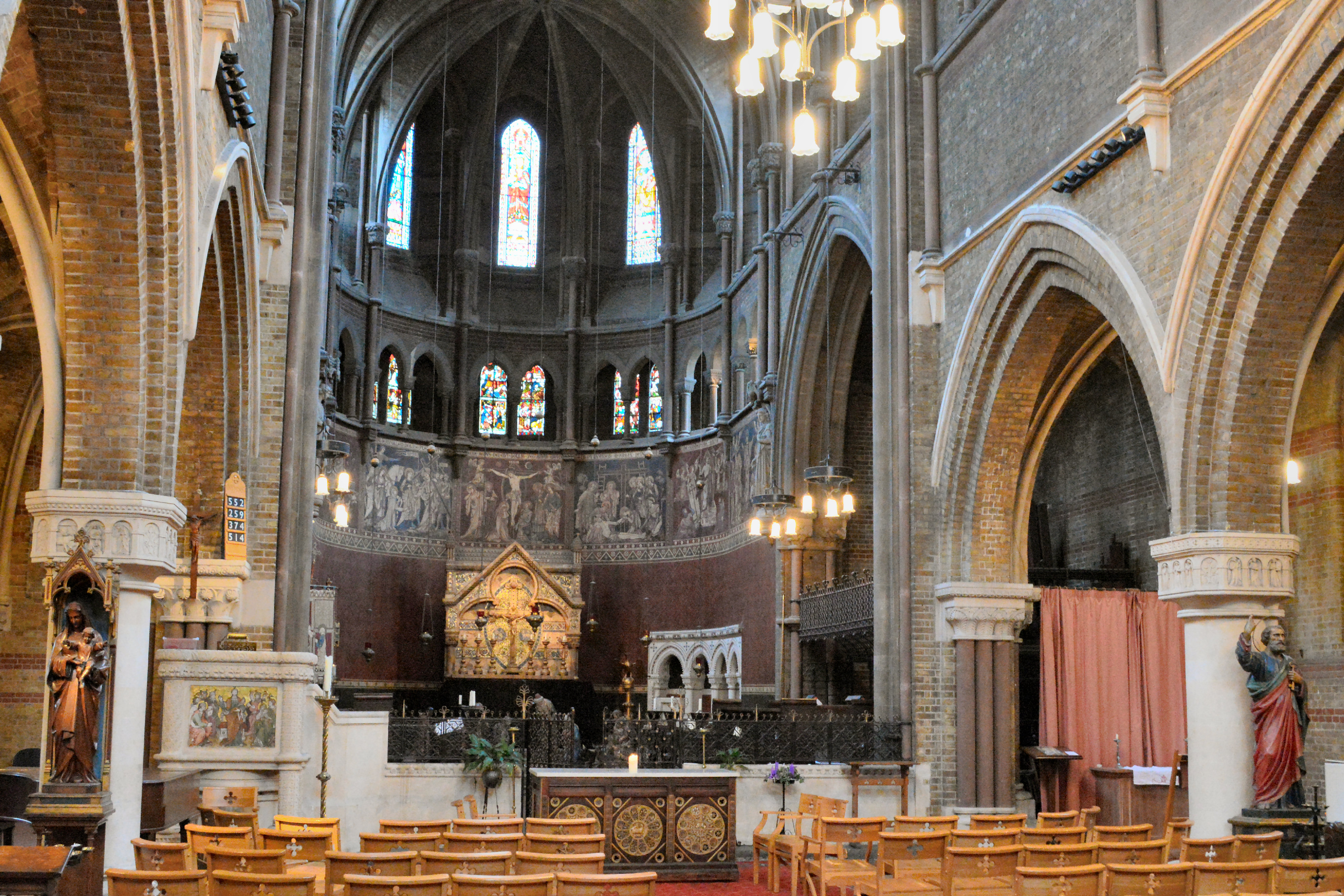
Vauxhall, St Peter's nave interior

St Peter's, Vauxhall, is a Church of England church on Kennington Lane, Vauxhall, London SE11.

The church was planned in 1860 by John Loughborough Pearson, and built in 1863–64 together with schools, orphanage and vicarage, and is one only a few Grade II* listed buildings in the area. This was Pearson's first major town church. The church cost only £8,000 to build. It has a complete set of fittings, including a small organ by Lewis that packs a serious punch. There are concerts from time to time in the church. The St Peter's Singers sing evensong on the last Sunday of the month but not in summer and with adjustments on account of Easter and Advent/Christmas.

The altar apparently stands on the site of the Neptune fountain in the earlier Vauxhall Gardens. The alabaster reredos was designed by Pearson and made by Poole of Westminster; the mosaic is by Salviati of Venice. The frescos in the sanctuary are by Clayton and Bell, installed between 1866 and 1868. The scenes are: The Killing of Abel (1877), Melchisedech the High Priest (1877), The Last Supper, The Agony in the Garden, Christ Carrying the Cross, The Crucifixion, The Descent from the Cross, The Resurrection, Christ's appearance to the Apostles after the Resurrection. The stained glass in the upper lancets is by Lavers, Barraud and Westlake (1864-5).

The font was also made by Poole of Westminster. The bowl is decorated with incised scenes of the Baptism of Christ by Nicholl, who was paid £18 for ‘incising the font’ in 1874. The font cover has stencilled geometric decoration, designed by Pearson (1891).

With St Anselm's Church, Kennington, it forms the North Lambeth parish.
