= Muirhead Bone =

Scottish artist (1876–1953)

Sir Muirhead Bone
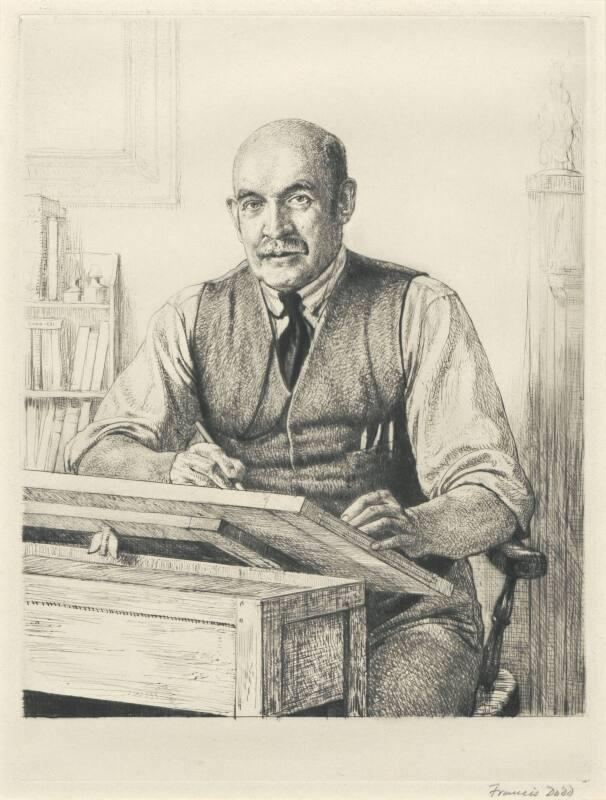
- Etching by Francis Dodd, c. 1925–1949
- Born: 23 March 1876; Glasgow, Scotland
- Died: 21 October 1953 (aged 77); Oxford, England
- Education: Glasgow School of Art
- Known for: Painting, etching, drypoint, drawing
- Spouse: Gertrude Helena Dodd (m. 1903)
- Children: 2

Sir Muirhead Bone (23 March 1876 – 21 October 1953) was a Scottish etcher and watercolourist who became known for his depiction of industrial and architectural subjects and his work as a war artist in both the First and Second World Wars.

A figure in the last generation of the Etching Revival, Bone's early large and heavily worked architectural subjects fetched extremely high prices before the Wall Street crash of 1929 deflated the collectors' market. He was well known, if not notorious, for publishing large numbers of different states of etchings, encouraging collectors to buy several impressions.

Bone was an active member of both the British War Memorials Committee in the First World War and the War Artists' Advisory Committee in the Second World War. He promoted the work of many young artists and served as a Trustee of the Tate Gallery, the National Gallery, and the Imperial War Museum.

== Early life ==
Muirhead Bone was born in Partick, Glasgow. His parents were journalist David Drummond Bone (1841–1911) and Elizabeth Millar Crawford (1847–1886). Bone and his siblings attended the local Board school and were placed in apprenticeships from the age of fourteen. James Bone, Muirhead Bone's senior by four years, was apprenticed as a newspaper reporter and went on to become the London correspondent of the Manchester Guardian while David Bone, another older brother, joined the navy and eventually became Commander Master of the Anchor Line and was knighted. Muirhead Bone was initially apprenticed as a painter of porcelain and later as an architect's draughtsman and completed a four-year apprenticeship before immediately turning to art.

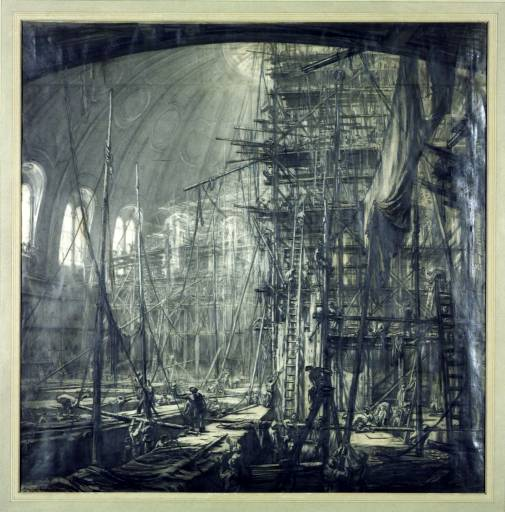
The British Museum Reading Room, May 1907 (1907), Tate Gallery

Bone studied at the Glasgow School of Art, initially at evening classes. There he befriended the artist Francis Dodd and his sister Gertrude Helena Dodd, to whom he became engaged in 1898. He began printmaking in 1898, his first known print was a lithograph and he is now better known for his etchings and drypoints. His subject matter was principally related to landscapes and architecture, which included urban construction and demolition sites, Gothic cathedrals and Norman buildings. The collection of his prints held by the British Museum contains a number of works based in South Ayrshire, between 1898 and 1916. In 1900 he tried to run art classes in Ayr, from newly built premises at Wellington Chambers.

In 1901 Bone moved to London, where he met William Strang, Dugald MacColl and Alphonse Legros, and became a member of the New English Art Club. He held his first solo exhibition at the Carfax Gallery in 1902. Bone was also a member of the Glasgow Art Club with which he exhibited. In 1903, Bone had finally achieved enough financial success as an artist that he could afford to marry Gertrude, after a five-year engagement. They moved to Chiswick and had their first son, Stephen, in 1904, and their second son, Gavin, in 1907. Bone continued to visit Ayr, producing the notable prints of Ayr Prison in 1905 and a series based on the view of the Ballantrae Road in 1907.

== First World War and interbellum ==
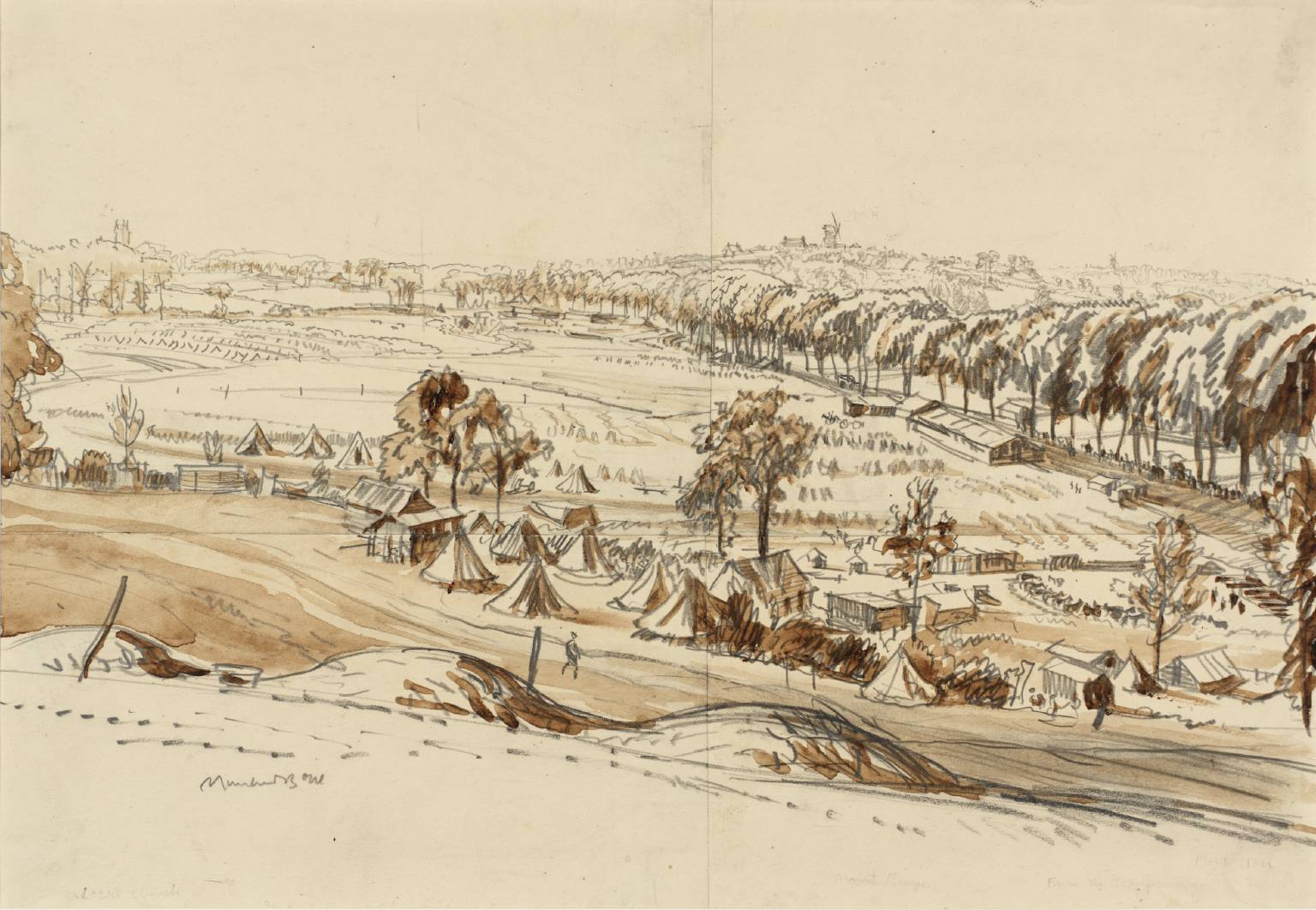
A View in Flanders behind the Lines, Showing Locre and the Tops of Dug-Outs on the Scherpenber (1916; Tate, London).

During the First World War, Charles Masterman, head of the British War Propaganda Bureau, acting on the advice of William Rothenstein, appointed Bone as the first official British war artist in May 1916. Bone had lobbied hard for the establishment of an Official War Artists scheme and in June 1916 he was sent to France with an honorary rank and a salary of £500. Although thirty-eight years old at the outbreak of war, Bone was spared from certain enlistment by his appointment. Bone's small, black and white drawings, and their realistic intensity, reproduced well in the government-funded publications of the day. Where some artists might have demurred at the challenge of drawing ocean liners in a drydock or tens of thousands of shells in a munitions factory, Bone delighted in them; he was rarely intimidated by complex subjects and whatever the challenge those who commissioned his work could always be sure that out of superficial chaos there emerged a beautiful and ordered design.

Commissioned as an honorary second lieutenant, Bone served as a war artist with the Allied forces on the Western Front and also with the Royal Navy for a time. He arrived in France on 16 August 1916, during the Battle of the Somme and produced 150 drawings of the war before returning to England in October 1916. Over the next few months Bone returned to his earlier subject matter, producing six lithographs of shipyards on the Clyde for the War Propaganda Bureau's Britain's Efforts and Ideals portfolio of images which were exhibited in Britain and abroad and were also sold as prints to raise money for the war effort. He visited France again in 1917 where he took particular interest depicting architectural ruins. Two volumes of Bone's wartime drawings were published during the war, The Western Front and With the Grand Fleet. He was an active member of the British War Memorials Committee and helped select which artists received commissions from the committee. He established the Muirhead Bone Fund to purchase works for the Imperial War Museum with his share of the proceeds of the sale of reproductions of his own works.

After the Armistice, Bone returned to the type of works he produced before the war, and was influential in promoting fellow war artists William Orpen and Wyndham Lewis. He began to undertake extensive foreign travels, visiting France, Italy and the Netherlands, which increasingly influenced his work. In 1923 he produced three portraits of the novelist Joseph Conrad during an Atlantic crossing. An extended visit to Spain in 1929 resulted in the folio Old Spain, a collaboration with his wife who wrote the text, which was published in 1936. In the inter-war period he exhibited extensively in London and New York, building up a considerable reputation. Bone received a knighthood in the 1937 Coronation Honours for services to art and he served as a Trustee and on the committees of several institutions including the Tate, the National Gallery and the Imperial War Museum.

== Second World War ==
At the outbreak of the Second World War, Muirhead Bone was appointed a member of the War Artists' Advisory Committee and also became a full-time salaried artist to the Ministry of Information specialising in Admiralty subjects. He produced scenes of coastal installations, evacuated troops and portraits of officers. However, following the death of his son Gavin in 1943, he decided not to continue with the Admiralty commission but he did remain an active Committee member until the end of the war. His other son, Stephen Bone, was subsequently appointed to the vacant Admiralty position.

== Death ==
Bone died on 21 October 1953 in Oxford. He was buried in the churchyard adjacent to the St. Mary's Church, Whitegate at Vale Royal parish in Cheshire. He has a memorial stone in St. Paul's Cathedral in London.

== Bibliography and books illustrated ==
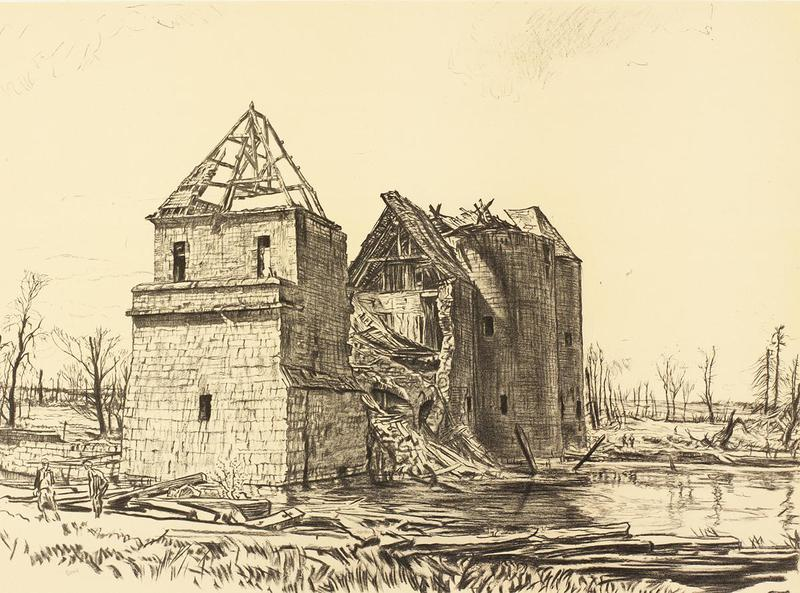
Chateau near Brie on the Somme (1918), Art.IWM REPRO00068459

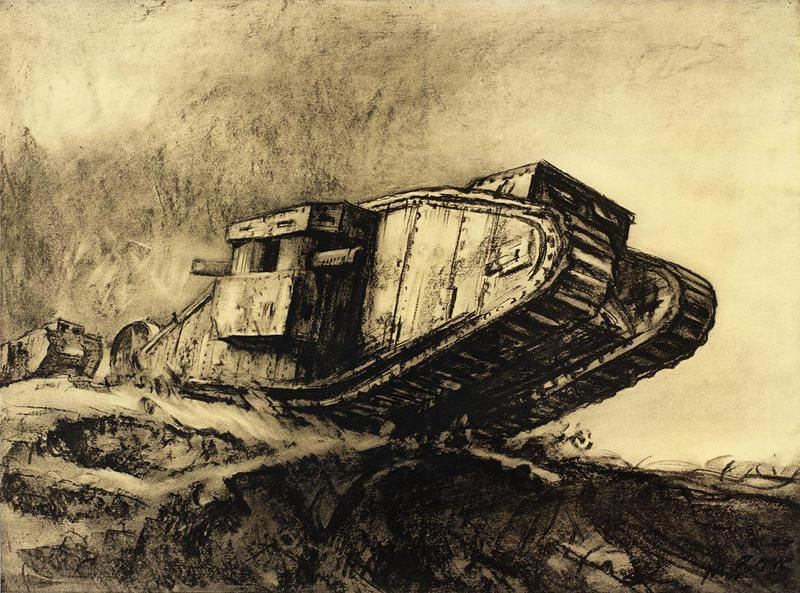
Tanks (1918), Art.IWM REPRO 0006847

- The Yellow Book (1897), (Contributor),
- Portfolio (1899),
- Glasgow (1901),
- Children's Children (1908)
- Glasgow: Fifty Drawings (1911),
- The Front Line (1916),
- The Western Front: Drawings by Muirhead Bone (1917), with an introduction by Gen. Sir Douglas Haig and text by C.E. Montague.
- Merchant Men-at-Arms (1919) by his brother David Bone
- With the Grand Fleet
- The London Perambulator (1925), by his brother James Bone
- Old Spain, (1936), with Gertrude Bone,
- The London Perambulator (1938),
- Days in Old Spain (1938), with Gertrude Bone
- London Echoing (1948),
- Hove (1948) Watercolour, street scene.
- Merchantman Rearmed (1949), by his brother David Bone
- The English and their Country (1952),
- Came to Oxford (1952), with Gertrude Bone
