= Stanley Adshead =

English architect

Adshead in September 1927.

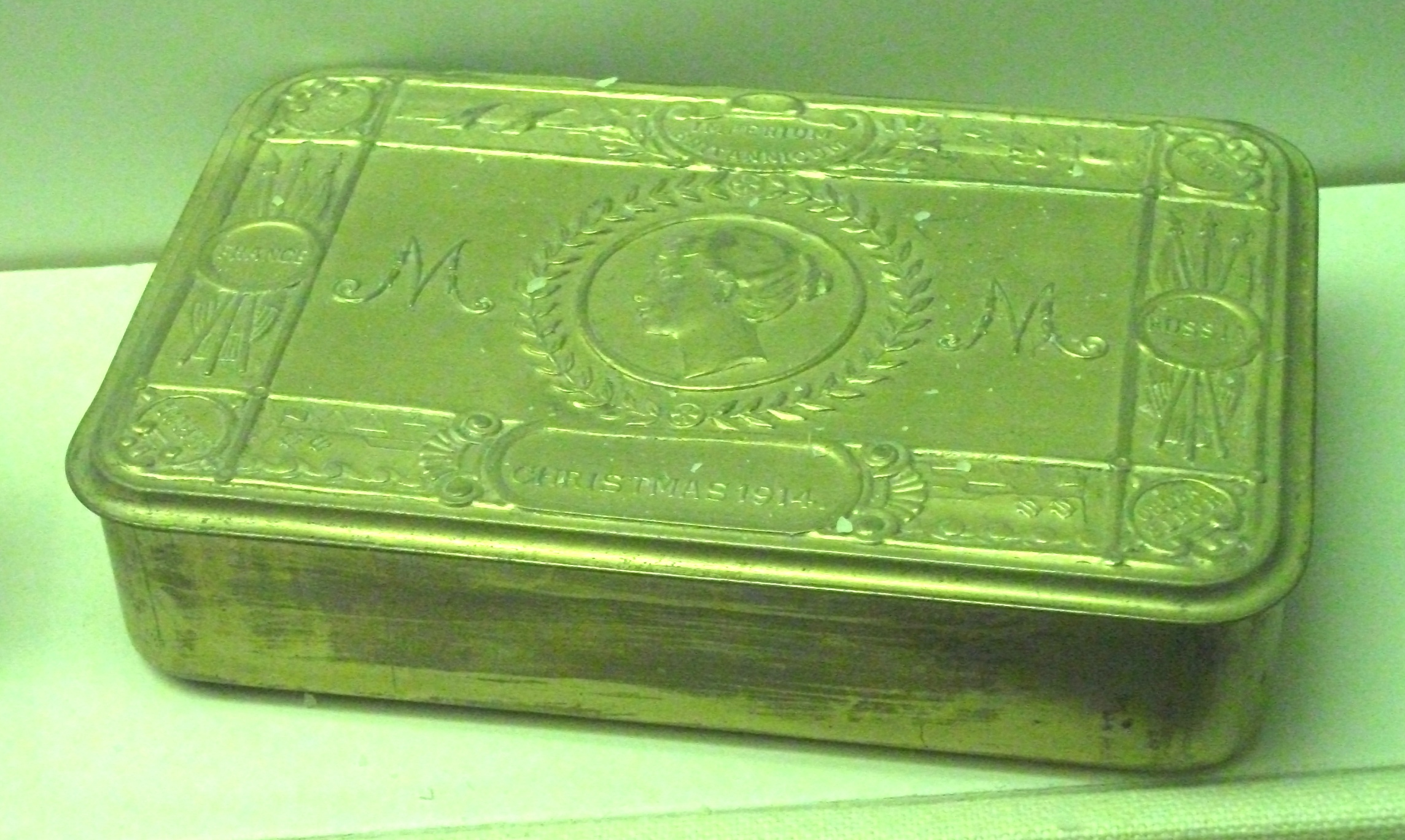
A box, originally containing chocolates and cigarettes, given by Princess Mary to all servicemen in France for Christmas 1914 (fighting World War 1). The words on the box are "IMPERIUM BRITANNICUM" at the top, "CHRISTMAS 1914" at the bottom, "FRANCE" on the left and "RUSSIA" on the right. The box was designed by architects Stanley Davenport Adshead and Stanley Churchill Ramsey.

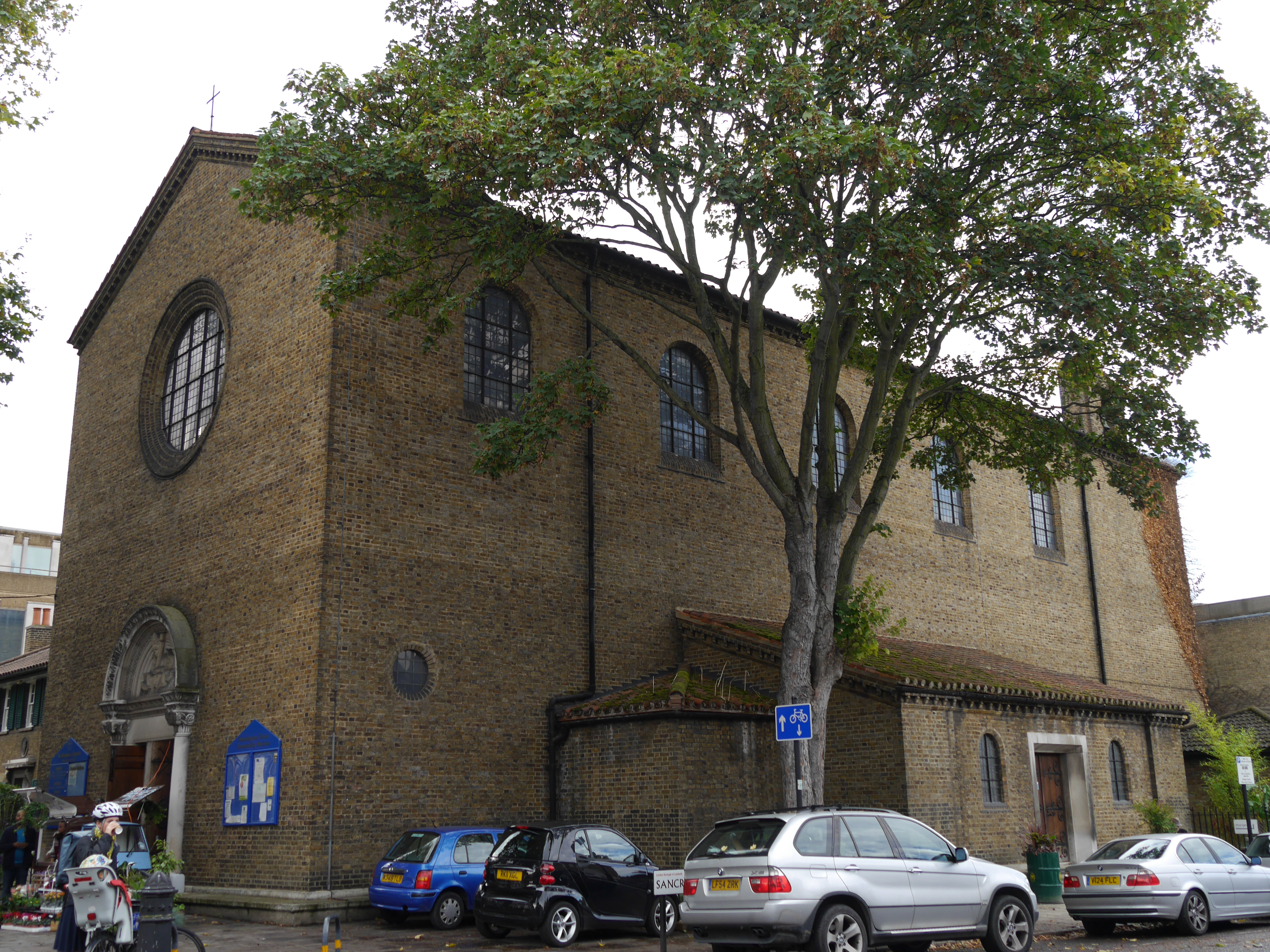
St Anselm's, Kennington, 2014 (1932–3, Adshead and Ramsey)

Stanley Davenport Adshead (1868–1946) was an English architect.

Born in Bowdon, Cheshire and raised in Buxton, Derbyshire, Adshead trained in Manchester and London before establishing an independent practice in London in 1898. His early work included a survey and plans for the development of Kennington, London, for the Duchy of Cornwall. In 1912 he was appointed Lever Professor of Civic Design at Liverpool University, and in September 1914 he became the first Professor of Town Planning at University College London. His published works include York: A plan for progress and preservation. He died on 11 April 1946 at Chapel Cottage, Lower Ashley, New Milton, Hampshire. His only daughter was Mary Adshead, a prominent painter, illustrator and designer.

He designed various entertainment buildings for seaside resorts, including:

- Royal Victoria Pavilion, Ramsgate (1903). After being closed for several years, it was bought by wetherspoons and refurbished.
- Worthing Lido (1925)
- Pavilion Theatre, Worthing Pier (1926)
- Victoria Pier's third pavilion (1934). In the process of demolition in 2018. Original murals by Mary Adshead are being salvaged.
- A large-scale redevelopment of Scarborough, North Yorkshire was planned by the Scarborough Corporation in 1938, to designs by Adshead, although this was cancelled following the outbreak of WWII.
