= Ellerker =

Village and civil parish in the East Riding of Yorkshire, England

Coordinates: 53°45′13″N 0°36′14″W

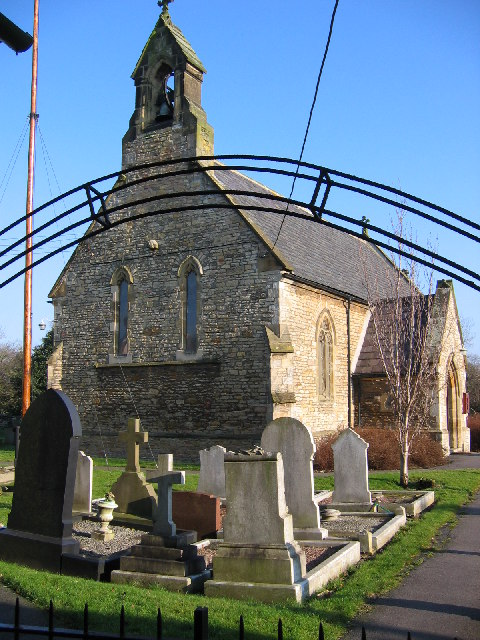
- St Anne's Church

- Location within the East Riding of Yorkshire
- Population: 307 (2011 census)
- OS grid reference: SE920294
  - London: 155 mi (249 km) S
- Civil parish: Ellerker
- Unitary authority: East Riding of Yorkshire
- Ceremonial county: East Riding of Yorkshire
- Region: Yorkshire and the Humber
- Country: England
- Sovereign state: United Kingdom
- Post town: BROUGH
- Postcode district: HU15
- Dialling code: 01430
- Police: Humberside
- Fire: Humberside
- Ambulance: Yorkshire
- UK Parliament: Goole and Pocklington

Ellerker is a village and civil parish in the East Riding of Yorkshire, England. It is situated approximately 10 miles (16 km) west of Hull city centre and 13 miles (21 km) east of the market town of Howden. It lies 1 mile (1.6 km) south of the A63 road junction with the A1034 road.

According to the 2011 UK Census, Ellerker parish had a population of 307, a decrease on the 2001 UK Census figure of 320. Ellerker lies within the Parliamentary constituency of Goole and Pocklington.

'Ellerker' means a "marsh where alder trees grow", from Old English alor or aler "alder" and Old Norse kjarr "marsh". The name was recorded as Alrecher in the 11th century and Alekirr in 1139. Same name as Orcher (Normandy, Aurichier 12th century).

In 1823, Ellerker was in the parish of Brantingham and the Wapentake of Howdenshire. Village population was 249, including eight farmers, a corn miller, a shopkeeper, a tailor, a shoemaker, and a carpenter. Also listed in directories were three yeomen and a curate of the village church. Once a week a carrier operated from the village to Hull and Wilton.

The Anglican St Anne's Church, Ellerker is designated as a Grade II listed building.

Sir Rafe Ellerker is cited in Part 1 of the title 'The Last Years of a Frontier' — D. L. W. Tough, concerning his survey of the Border Marches, 1541.

== See also ==
- Listed buildings in Ellerker
