= 2023–24 National League 1 =

Rugby union competition in England

2023–24 National League One
- Countries: England
- Date: 2 September 2023 – 27 April 2024
- Champions: Chinnor (1st title)
- Runners-up: Rams
- Relegated: Cinderford, Taunton Titans
- Matches played: 182
- Attendance: 124,419 (average 684 per match)
- Highest attendance: 2,270 – Chinnor v Rams, 15 December 2023
- Lowest attendance: 160 – Leicester Lions v Rosslyn Park, 11 November 2023
- Tries scored: 1324 (average 7.3 per match)
- Top point scorer: 229 – Warren Seals (Sedgley Park)
- Top try scorer: 26 – Max Hayman (Rams)

The 2023–24 National League 1 is the 36th season of the third tier of the English domestic rugby union competitions.

Chinnor claimed the league title on 13 April with one game still to play following a resounding away win at Birmingham Moseley. Runners up Rams looked like contenders for most of the season but in the end it was comfortable for Chinnor, who finished 13 points clear. In winning the league Chinnor would be promoted to the 2024–25 RFU Championship - the highest level the club had reached in its history.

The relegation race was very tight and went to the last game of the season, with four sides possibly going down. In the end Cinderford and Taunton Titans were the relegated teams. In Taunton's case they would feel particular hard done by having won the final four games of the season but in the end missing out on survival by just one point. Both sides would drop down to the 2024–25 National League 2 West, with Taunton returning to tier 4 for the first time in three seasons and Cinderford in six.

== Structure ==
The league consists of fourteen teams, with all the teams playing each other on a home and away basis, to make a total of twenty-six matches each. There is one promotion place, with the champions promoted to the RFU Championship, and typically there are three relegation places to either, National League 2 East, National League 2 North or National League 2 West, depending on the geographical location of the team.

Due to the liquidation of RFU Championship side Jersey Reds in September 2023 and the knock on effect on the league system, there will only be two teams relegated from National League 1 at the end of the 2023–24 season.

The results of the matches contribute points to the league table as follows:

- 4 points are awarded for a win
- 2 points are awarded for a draw
- 0 points are awarded for a loss, however
- 1 losing (bonus) point is awarded to a team that loses a match by 7 points or fewer
- 1 additional (bonus) point is awarded to a team scoring 4 tries or more in a match.

== Participating teams and locations ==
2023–24 National 1 teams in England
2023–24 Greater London National League 1 clubs

Team	Ground	Capacity	City/Area	Previous season
Birmingham Moseley	Billesley Common	5,000 (1,300 seats)	Birmingham, West Midlands	9th
Bishop's Stortford	Silver Leys	1,600	Bishop's Stortford, Hertfordshire	6th
Blackheath	Well Hall	1,650 (550 seats)	Eltham, London	Promoted from National League 2 East (1st)
Chinnor	Kingsey Road	2,000	Thame, Oxfordshire	8th
Cinderford	Beavis Memorial Ground	2,500	Cinderford, Gloucestershire	7th
Darlington Mowden Park	The Darlington Arena	25,500	Darlington, County Durham	10th
Leicester Lions	Westleigh Park	2,000	Blaby, Leicestershire	Promoted from National League 2 West (1st)
Plymouth Albion	The Brickfields	8,500	Plymouth, Devon	5th
Rams	Old Bath Road	2,000 (300 seats)	Sonning, Reading, Berkshire	2nd
Richmond	Athletic Ground	4,500 (1,000 seats)	Richmond, London	Relegated from Championship (12th)
Rosslyn Park	The Rock	2,000 (630 seats)	Roehampton, London	4th
Sale FC	Heywood Road	3,387	Sale, Greater Manchester	3rd
Sedgley Park	Park Lane	3,000	Whitefield, Bury, Greater Manchester	Promoted from National League 2 North (1st)
Taunton Titans	Veritas Park	2,000 (198 seats)	Taunton, Somerset	11th

== League table ==
2023–24 National League 1 table
Pos	Team	Pld	W	D	L	PF	PA	PD	TB	LB	Pts	Result
1	Chinnor (C)	26	22	0	4	1039	403	+636	21	3	112	Promoted
2	Rams	26	19	0	7	787	585	+202	20	3	99	
3	Rosslyn Park	26	14	2	10	765	656	+109	17	5	82	
4	Plymouth Albion	26	15	0	11	631	571	+60	13	4	77	
5	Birmingham Moseley	26	14	1	11	649	667	−18	12	6	76	
6	Richmond	26	11	1	14	689	681	+8	14	8	68	
7	Darlington Mowden Park	26	12	0	14	635	682	−47	12	7	67	
8	Blackheath	26	12	1	13	641	613	+28	10	4	64	
9	Sedgley Park	26	11	1	14	657	784	−127	11	4	61	
10	Sale FC	26	11	0	15	567	628	−61	8	4	56	
11	Bishop's Stortford	26	10	0	16	592	746	−154	10	6	56	
12	Leicester Lions	26	11	0	15	525	697	−172	7	3	54	
13	Taunton Titans (R)	26	8	0	18	713	930	−217	17	4	53	Relegated
14	Cinderford (R)	26	9	0	17	528	775	−247	6	6	48	Relegated

Updated to match(es) played on 12 May 2024. Source: "National League 1". RugbyEngland.
Source: "National League Rugby – Promotion and Relegation: 2023-24".
Rules for classification: If teams are level at any stage, tiebreakers are applied in the following order:
1. Number of matches won
2. Team with most draws
3. Difference between points for and against
4. Total number of points for
5. Aggregate number of points scored in matches between tied teams
6. Number of matches won excluding the first match, then the second and so on until the tie is settled
  (C) Champion; (R) Relegated

== Fixtures & results ==
Fixtures for the season were published by the RFU on 12 June 2023.

=== Round 1 ===
2 September 2023
15:00

(2 BP) Bishop's Stortford	28 – 30	Cinderford

Silver Leys
Attendance: 605
Referee: Owen Taylor

2 September 2023
15:00

(1 BP) Chinnor	22 – 10	Darlington Mowden Park

Kingsey Road
Attendance: 813
Referee: Matt Sharpe

2 September 2023
15:00

Leicester Lions	23 – 19	Sale FC (1 BP)

Westleigh Park
Attendance: 350
Referee: Timothy Allatt

2 September 2023
15:00

(1 BP) Rams	50 – 36	Birmingham Moseley (1 BP)

Old Bath Road
Attendance: 859
Referee: Alan Chandrachud

2 September 2023
15:00

(1 BP) Rosslyn Park	39 – 36	Plymouth Albion (2 BP)

The Rock
Attendance: 517
Referee: Richard Gordon

2 September 2023
15:00

(1 BP) Sedgley Park	32 – 31	Richmond (2 BP)

Park Lane
Attendance: 300
Referee: Andrew Wigley

2 September 2023
15:00

(1 BP) Taunton Titans	33 – 36	Blackheath

Veritas Park
Attendance: 599
Referee: Alan Chandrachud

=== Round 2 ===
8 September 2023
19:45

(1 BP) Rams	29 – 19	Chinnor

Old Bath Road
Attendance: 836
Referee: Owen Taylor

9 September 2023
15:00

Birmingham Moseley	21 – 44	Sedgley Park (1 BP)

Billesley Common
Attendance: 725
Referee: Timothy Allatt

9 September 2023
15:00

(1 BP) Blackheath	27 – 31	Bishops Stortford (1 BP)

Well Hall
Attendance: 480
Referee: Jamie Parr

9 September 2023
15:00

Cinderford	23 – 17	Leicester Lions (1 BP)

Beavis Memorial Ground
Attendance: 302
Referee: Adam Wookey

9 September 2023
15:00

(1 BP) Plymouth Albion	54 – 29	Taunton Titans (1 BP)

The Brickfields
Attendance: 1,216
Referee: Iain Kiy

9 September 2023
15:00

(1 BP) Richmond	24 – 31	Rosslyn Park (1 BP)

Athletic Ground
Attendance: 1,035
Referee: Alan Chandrachud

9 September 2023
15:00

(1 BP) Sale FC	21 – 28	Darlington Mowden Park

Heywood Road
Attendance: 693
Referee: Neil Sweeney

=== Round 3 ===
16 September 2023
14:00

Leicester Lions	3 – 34	Blackheath (1 BP)

Westleigh Park
Attendance: 170
Referee: Matthew Sharpe

16 September 2023
14:30

Sedgley Park	20 – 41	Rams (1 BP)

Park Lane
Attendance: 350
Referee: Timothy Allatt

16 September 2023
15:00

(1 BP) Bishops Stortford	21 – 24	Plymouth Albion

Silver Leys
Attendance: 503
Referee: Ben Wood

16 September 2023
15:00

(1 BP) Chinnor	36 – 0	Sale FC

Kingsey Road
Attendance: 576
Referee: Jamie Parr

16 September 2023
15:00

Darlington Mowden Park	25 – 20	Cinderford (1 BP)

Northern Echo Arena
Attendance: 744
Referee: Ben Rayner

16 September 2023
15:00

(1 BP) Rosslyn Park	19 – 24	Birmingham Moseley

The Rock
Attendance: 360
Referee: Iain Kiy

16 September 2023
15:00

Taunton Titans	14 – 29	Richmond (1 BP)

Veritas Park
Attendance: 432
Referee: Callum Watson

=== Round 4 ===
23 September 2023
14:30

Sedgley Park	27 – 21	Chinnor (1 BP)

Park Lane
Attendance: 300
Referee: Callum Watson

23 September 2023
15:00

(1 BP) Birmingham Moseley	36 – 22	Taunton Titans (1 BP)

Billesley Common
Attendance: 700
Referee: Owen Taylor

23 September 2023
15:00

(1 BP) Blackheath	43 – 13	Darlington Mowden Park

Well Hall
Attendance: 320

23 September 2023
15:00

Cinderford	15 – 12	Sale FC (1 BP)

Beavis Memorial Ground
Attendance: 275
Referee: Adam Wookey

23 September 2023
15:00

(1 BP) Plymouth Albion	45 – 21	Leicester Lions

The Brickfields
Attendance: 876
Referee: Iain Kiy

23 September 2023
15:00

(1 BP) Rams	31 – 20	Rosslyn Park

Old Bath Road
Attendance: 847
Referee: Alan Chandrachud

23 September 2023
15:00

(1 BP) Richmond	50 – 40	Bishops Stortford (1 BP)

Athletic Ground
Attendance: 553
Referee: Neil Sweeney

=== Round 5 ===
30 September 2023
14:00

Leicester Lions	22 – 35	Richmond (1 BP)

Westleigh Park
Attendance: 200
Referee: Ben Rayner

30 September 2023
15:00

(1 BP) Bishops Stortford	29 – 22	Birmingham Moseley (1 BP)

Silver Leys
Attendance: 541
Referee: Matthew Sharpe

30 September 2023
15:00

(1 BP) Chinnor	48 – 17	Cinderford

Kingsey Road
Attendance: 311
Referee: Iain Kiy

30 September 2023
15:00

Darlington Mowden Park	17 – 27	Plymouth Albion (1 BP)

Northern Echo Arena
Attendance: 824
Referee: Ben Wood

30 September 2023
15:00

(1 BP) Rosslyn Park	67 – 15	Sedgley Park

The Rock
Attendance: 438
Referee: Jamie Parr

30 September 2023
15:00

Sale FC	19 – 14	Blackheath (1 BP)

Heywood Road
Attendance: 754
Referee: Owen Taylor

30 September 2023
15:00

(2 BP) Taunton Titans	35 – 41	Rams (1 BP)

Veritas Park
Attendance: 432
Referee: Callum Watson

=== Round 6 ===
7 October 2023
14:30

(1 BP) Blackheath	52 – 12	Cinderford

Well Hall
Attendance: 303
Referee: Neil Sweeney

7 October 2023
14:30

(1 BP) Sedgley Park	32 – 28	Taunton Titans (2 BP)

Park Lane
Attendance: 275
Referee: Ben Rayner

7 October 2023
15:00

Birmingham Moseley	25 – 18	Leicester Lions (1 BP)

Billesley Common
Attendance: 329
Referee: Michael Lamb

7 October 2023
15:00

(1 BP) Plymouth Albion	36 – 10	Sale FC

The Brickfields
Attendance: 1,127
Referee: Jamie Parr

7 October 2023
15:00

(1 BP) Rams	26 – 10	Bishop Stortford

Old Bath Road
Attendance: 912
Referee: Adam Wookey

7 October 2023
15:00

(1 BP) Richmond	24 – 34	Darlington Mowden Park (1 BP)

Athletic Ground
Attendance: 486
Referee: Iain Kiy

7 October 2023
15:00

Rosslyn Park	21 – 48	Chinnor (1 BP)

The Rock
Attendance: 423
Referee: Owen Taylor

=== Round 7 ===
14 October 2023
14:00

(1 BP) Leicester Lions	26 – 24	Rams (2 BP)

Westleigh Park
Attendance: 250
Referee: Iain Kiy

14 October 2023
14:15

(2 BP) Darlington Mowden Park	27 – 28	Birmingham Moseley

Northern Echo Arena
Attendance: 823
Referee: Owen Taylor

14 October 2023
15:00

(1 BP) Bishop's Stortford	33 – 45	Sedgley Park (1 BP)

Silver Leys
Attendance: 470
Referee: Matthew Sharpe

14 October 2023
15:00

(1 BP) Chinnor	53 – 8	Blackheath

Kingsey Road
Attendance: 589
Referee: Timothy Allatt

14 October 2023
15:00

Cinderford	20 – 12	Plymouth Albion

Beavis Memorial Ground
Attendance: 425
Referee: Alan Chandrachud

14 October 2023
15:00

Sale FC	15 – 24	Richmond

Heywood Road
Attendance: 402
Referee: Ben Rayner

14 October 2023
15:00

(1 BP) Taunton Titans	40 – 17	Rosslyn Park

Veritas Park
Attendance: 711
Referee: Adam Wookey

=== Round 8 ===
4 November 2023
14:30

Sedgley Park	28 – 20	Leicester Lions

Park Lane
Attendance: 300
Referee: Owen Taylor

4 November 2023
15:00

Birmingham Moseley	22 – 14	Sale FC

Billesley Common
Attendance: 500
Referee: Ben Rayner

4 November 2023
15:00

(1 BP) Plymouth Albion	28 – 15	Blackheath

The Brickfields
Attendance: 1,202
Referee: Adam Wookey

4 November 2023
15:00

(1 BP) Rams	36 – 41	Darlington Mowden Park (1 BP)

Old Bath Road
Attendance: 985
Referee: Timothy Allatt

4 November 2023
15:00

Richmond	7 – 24	Cinderford

Athletic Ground
Attendance: 675
Referee: Jamie Parr

4 November 2023
15:00

(1 BP) Rosslyn Park	48 – 22	Bishop's Stortford

The Rock
Attendance: 395
Referee: Matthew Sharpe

4 November 2023
15:00

Taunton Titans	21 – 53	Chinnor (1 BP)

Veritas Park
Attendance: 823
Referee: Iain Kiy

=== Round 9 ===
11 November 2023
14:00

Leicester Lions	23 – 32	Rosslyn Park (1 BP)

Westleigh Park
Attendance: 160
Referee: Iain Kiy

11 November 2023
14:30

Cinderford	14 – 34	Birmingham Moseley (1 BP)

Beavis Memorial Ground
Attendance: 375
Referee: Timothy Allatt

11 November 2023
15:00

(1 BP) Bishop's Stortford	38 – 29	Taunton Titans (1 BP)

Silver Leys
Attendance: 603
Referee: Mike Lamb

11 November 2023
15:00

Blackheath	21 – 17	Richmond (1 BP)

Well Hall
Attendance: 938
Referee: Ben Wood

11 November 2023
15:00

(1 BP) Chinnor	17 – 22	Plymouth Albion

Kingsey Road
Attendance: 985
Referee: Ben Rayner

11 November 2023
15:00

Darlington Mowden Park	25 – 18	Sedgley Park (1 BP)

Northern Echo Arena
Attendance: 871
Referee: Adam Wookey

11 November 2023
15:00

(1 BP) Sale FC	29 – 17	Rams

Heywood Road
Attendance: 803
Referee: Owen Taylor

=== Round 10 ===
18 November 2023
14:30

Sedgley Park	26 – 11	Sale FC

Park Lane
Attendance: 850
Referee: Michael Lamb

18 November 2023
15:00

Birmingham Moseley	19 – 17	Blackheath (1 BP)

Billesley Common
Attendance: 612
Referee: Callum Watson

18 November 2023
15:00

Bishop's Stortford	7 – 26	Chinnor (1 BP)

Silver Leys
Attendance: 588
Referee: Jamie Parr

18 November 2023
15:00

(1 BP) Rams	24 – 10	Cinderford

Old Bath Road
Attendance: 733
Referee: Matthew Sharpe

18 November 2023
15:00

(1 BP) Richmond	36 – 22	Plymouth Albion (1 BP)

Athletic Ground
Attendance: 678
Referee: Alan Chandrachud

18 November 2023
15:00

(1 BP) Rosslyn Park	38 – 7	Darlington Mowden Park

The Rock
Attendance: 510
Referee: Ben Wood

18 November 2023
15:00

Taunton Titans	17 – 27	Leicester Lions (1 BP)

Veritas Park
Attendance: 753
Referee: Adam Wookey

=== Round 11 ===
25 November 2023
14:00

(2 BP) Leicester Lions	29 – 36	Bishop's Stortford (1 BP)

Westleigh Park
Attendance: 265
Referee: Callum Watson

25 November 2023
15:00

Blackheath	22 – 42	Rams (1 BP)

Well Hall
Attendance: 806
Referee: Iain Kiy

25 November 2023
15:00

(1 BP) Chinnor	55 – 26	Richmond (1 BP)

Kingsey Road
Attendance: 976
Referee: Adam Wookey

25 November 2023
15:00

Cinderford	19 – 43	Sedgley Park (1 BP)

Beavis Memorial Ground
Attendance: 275
Referee: James Parr

25 November 2023
15:00

(1 BP) Darlington Mowden Park	24 – 33	Taunton Titans (1 BP)

Northern Echo Arena
Attendance: 721
Referee: Llyr ApGeraint-Roberts

25 November 2023
15:00

Plymouth Albion	19 – 18	Birmingham Moseley (1 BP)

The Brickfields
Attendance: 1,152
Referee: Matthew Sharpe

25 November 2023
15:00

(1 BP) Sale FC	45 – 12	Rosslyn Park

Heywood Road
Attendance: 723
Referee: Ben Wood

=== Round 12 ===
2 December 2023
14:00

Leicester Lions	15 – 40	Chinnor (1 BP)

Westleigh Park
Attendance: 287
Referee: Jamie Parr

2 December 2023
14:30

Sedgley Park	P – P	Blackheath

Park Lane

- Postponed due to frozen pitch. Game to be rescheduled for 6 January 2024.

2 December 2023
15:00

Birmingham Moseley	P – P	Richmond

Billesley Common

- Postponed due to frozen pitch. Game to be rescheduled for 6 January 2024.

2 December 2023
15:00

Bishop's Stortford	13 – 6	Darlington Mowden Park (1 BP)

Silver Keys
Attendance: 350
Referee: Adam Wookey

2 December 2023
15:00

Rams	22 – 20	Plymouth Albion (1 BP)

Old Bath Road
Attendance: 993
Referee: Owen Taylor

2 December 2023
15:00

(1 BP) Rosslyn Park	42 – 29	Cinderford (1 BP)

The Rock
Attendance: 328
Referee: Michael Lamb

2 December 2023
15:00

(1 BP) Taunton Titans	32 – 56	Sale FC (1 BP)

Veritas Park
Attendance: 612
Referee: Matthew Sharpe

=== Round 13 ===
9 December 2023
15:00

Blackheath	0 – 15	Rosslyn Park

Well Hall
Attendance: 613
Referee: Jamie Parr

9 December 2023
15:00

(1 BP) Chinnor	27 – 24	Birmingham Moseley (1 BP)

Kingsey Road
Attendance: 393
Referee: Matthew Sharpe

9 December 2023
15:00

(1 BP) Cinderford	40 – 31	Taunton Titans (1 BP)

Beavis Memorial Ground
Attendance: 305
Referee: Adam Wookey

9 December 2023
15:00

(1 BP) Darlington Mowden Park	29 – 3	Leicester Lions

Northern Echo Arena
Attendance: 612
Referee: Ben Rayner

9 December 2023
15:00

Plymouth Albion	22 – 3	Sedgley Park

The Brickfields
Attendance: 1,238
Referee: Iain Kiy

9 December 2023
15:00

(2 BP) Richmond	40 – 47	Rams (1 BP)

Athletic Ground
Attendance: 1,205
Referee: Timothy Allatt

9 December 2023
15:00

Sale FC	8 – 7	Bishop's Stortford (1 BP)

Heywood Road
Attendance: 734
Referee: Owen Taylor

=== Round 14 ===
15 December 2023
19:45

Chinnor	21 – 7	Rams

Kingsey Road
Attendance: 2,270
Referee: Alan Chandrachud

16 December 2023
14:00

Leicester Lions	25 – 20	Cinderford (1 BP)

Wesleigh Park
Attendance: 397
Referee: Timothy Allatt

16 December 2023
14:30

(1 BP) Sedgley Park	32 – 26	Birmingham Moseley (2 BP)

Park Lane
Attendance: 450
Referee: Owen Taylor

16 December 2023
15:00

(1 BP) Bishop's Stortford	14 – 18	Blackheath

Silver Leys
Attendance: 620
Referee: Callum Watson

16 December 2023
15:00

(1 BP) Darlington Mowden Park	29 – 19	Sale FC

Northern Echo Arena
Attendance: 855
Referee: Matthew Sharpe

16 December 2023
15:00

(1 BP) Rosslyn Park	18 – 22	Richmond

The Rock
Attendance: 1,150
Referee: Iain Kiy

16 December 2023
15:00

(1 BP) Taunton Titans	29 – 24	Plymouth Albion (2 BP)

Veritas Park
Attendance: 1,314
Referee: Mike Lamb

=== Round 12 (rescheduled games) ===
6 January 2024
14:30

(1 BP) Sedgley Park	17 – 24	Blackheath

Park Lane
Attendance: 300
Referee: Benjamin Wood

- Game rescheduled from 2 December 2023.

6 January 2024
15:00

(1 BP) Birmingham Moseley	31 – 29	Richmond (2 BP)

Billesley Common
Attendance: 570
Referee: Ben Rayner

- Game rescheduled from 2 December 2023.

=== Round 15 ===
13 January 2024
15:00

(2 BP) Birmingham Moseley	32 – 33	Rosslyn Park (1 BP)

Billesley Common
Attendance: 617
Referee: Matthew Sharpe

13 January 2024
15:00

(2 BP) Blackheath	27 – 29	Leicester Lions (1 BP)

Well Hall
Attendance: 650
Referee: Iain Kiy

13 January 2024
15:00

Cinderford	24 – 23	Darlington Mowden Park (2 BP)

Beavis Memorial Ground
Attendance: 250
Referee: Alan Chandrachud

13 January 2024
15:00

(1 BP) Plymouth Albion	39 – 23	Bishop's Stortford

The Brickfields
Attendance: 1,305
Referee: Ben Wood

13 January 2024
15:00

(1 BP) Rams	28 – 7	Sedgley Park

Old Bath Road
Attendance: 732
Referee: Jamie Parr

13 January 2024
15:00

(1 BP) Richmond	22 – 21	Taunton Titans (1 BP)

Athletic Ground
Attendance: 905
Referee: Neil Sweeney

13 January 2024
15:00

Sale FC	10 – 47	Chinnor (1 BP)

Heywood Road
Attendance: 836
Referee: Timothy Allatt

=== Round 16 ===
20 January 2024
14:00

Leicester Lions	P – P	Plymouth Albion

Westleigh Park

- Postponed due to frozen pitch. Game to be rescheduled for 3 February 2024.

20 January 2024
15:00

Bishop's Stortford	P – P	Richmond

Silver Leys

- Postponed due to frozen pitch. Game to be rescheduled for 3 February 2024.

20 January 2024
15:00

Chinnor	P – P	Sedgley Park

Kingsey Road

- Postponed due to frozen pitch. Game to be rescheduled for 3 February 2024.

20 January 2024
15:00

Darlington Mowden Park	P – P	Blackheath

Northern Echo Arena

- Postponed due to frozen pitch. Game to be rescheduled for 3 February 2024.

20 January 2024
15:00

(1 BP) Rosslyn Park	17 – 21	Rams

The Rock
Attendance: 556
Referee: Ben Rayner

20 January 2024
15:00

Sale FC	P – P	Cinderford

Heywood Road

- Postponed due to frozen pitch. Game to be rescheduled for 3 February 2024.

20 January 2024
15:00

Taunton Titans	15 – 34	Birmingham Moseley (1 BP)

Veritas Park
Attendance: 339
Referee: Iain Kiy

=== Round 17 ===
27 January 2024
14:30

Cinderford	0 – 57	Chinnor (1 BP)

Beavis Memorial Ground
Attendance: 275
Referee: Matt Sharpe

27 January 2024
14:30

(1 BP) Sedgley Park	24 – 24	Rosslyn Park (1 BP)

Park Lane
Attendance: 400
Referee: Owen Taylor

27 January 2024
15:00

(1 BP) Birmingham Moseley	38 – 13	Bishop's Stortford

Billesley Common
Attendance: 585
Referee: Ben Rayner

27 January 2024
15:00

Blackheath	10 – 21	Sale FC

Well Hall
Attendance: 335
Referee: Ben Wood

27 January 2024
15:00

Plymouth Albion	17 – 28	Darlington Mowden Park (1 BP)

The Brickfields
Attendance: 1,505
Referee: Iain Kiy

27 January 2024
15:00

(1 BP) Rams	52 – 17	Taunton Titans

Old Bath Road
Attendance: 834
Referee: Adam Wookey

27 January 2024
15:00

(1 BP) Richmond	20 – 21	Leicester Lions

Athletic Ground
Attendance: 725
Referee: Ben Rayner

=== Round 16 (rescheduled games) ===
3 February 2024
14:00

Leicester Lions	19 – 12	Plymouth Albion (1 BP)

Westleigh Park
Attendance: 285
Referee: Jack Moorhouse

- Game rescheduled from 20 January 2024.

3 February 2024
15:00

Bishop's Stortford	14 – 38	Richmond (1 BP)

Silver Leys
Attendance: 300
Referee: Owen Taylor

- Game rescheduled from 20 January 2024.

3 February 2024
15:00

(1 BP) Darlington Mowden Park	42 – 27	Blackheath

Northern Echo Arena
Attendance: 572
Referee: Timothy Allatt

- Game rescheduled from 20 January 2024.

3 February 2024
15:00

Sale FC	21 – 15	Cinderford (1 BP)

Heywood Road
Attendance: 674
Referee: Jamie Parr

- Game rescheduled from 20 January 2024.

3 February 2024
17:00

(1 BP) Chinnor	38 – 34	Sedgley Park (2 BP)

Kingsey Road
Attendance: 689
Referee: Alan Chandrachud

- Game rescheduled from 20 January 2024.

=== Round 18 ===
9 February 2024
19:45

(1 BP) Chinnor	31 – 10	Rosslyn Park

Kingsey Road
Attendance: 1,756
Referee: Jamie Parr

10 February 2024
14:00

Leicester Lions	10 – 20	Birmingham Moseley

Westleigh Park
Attendance: 308
Referee: Adam Wookey

10 February 2024
14:30

Cinderford	18 – 30	Blackheath (1 BP)

Beavis Memorial Ground
Attendance: 308
Referee: Iain Kiy

10 February 2024
15:00

Bishop's Stortford	14 – 26	Rams (1 BP)

Silver Leys
Attendance: 424
Referee: Alan Chandrachud

10 February 2024
15:00

(1 BP) Darlington Mowden Park	34 – 22	Richmond

Northern Echo Arena
Attendance: 617
Referee: Matt Sharp

10 February 2024
15:00

(1 BP) Sale FC	31 – 3	Plymouth Albion

Heywood Road
Attendance: 703
Referee: Timothy Allatt

10 February 2024
15:00

(1 BP) Taunton Titans	49 – 14	Sedgley Park

Veritas Park
Attendance: 615
Referee: Matt Lamb

=== Round 19 ===
17 February 2024
14:30

Sedgley Park	14 – 22	Bishop's Stortford

Park Lane
Attendance: 350
Referee: Ben Rayner

17 February 2024
15:00

(1 BP) Birmingham Moseley	32 – 28	Darlington Mowden Park (1 BP)

Billesley Common
Attendance: 633
Referee: Alan Chandrachad

17 February 2024
15:00

Blackheath	22 – 17	Chinnor (1 BP)

Well Hall
Attendance: 745
Referee: Adam Wookey

17 February 2024
15:00

(1 BP) Plymouth Albion	24 – 3	Cinderford

The Brickfields
Attendance: 1,003
Referee: Callum Watson

17 February 2024
15:00

(1 BP) Rams	33 – 12	Leicester Lions

Old Bath Road
Attendance: 748
Referee: Timothy Allatt

17 February 2024
15:00

(1 BP) Richmond	31 – 19	Sale FC

Athletic Ground
Attendance: 1,018
Referee: Keith David

17 February 2024
15:00

(1 BP) Rosslyn Park	38 – 14	Taunton Titans

The Rock
Attendance: 531
Referee: Ben Wood

=== Round 20 ===
24 February 2024
14:00

Darlington Mowden Park	14 – 28	Rams (1 BP)

Northern Echo Arena
Attendance: 644
Referee: Iain Kiy

24 February 2024
14:00

(1 BP) Leicester Lions	36 – 17	Sedgley Park

Westleigh Park
Attendance: 318
Referee: Owen Taylor

24 February 2024
15:00

(1 BP) Bishop's Stortford	21 – 27	Rosslyn Park (1 BP)

Silver Leys
Attendance: 650
Referee: Neil Sweeney

24 February 2024
15:00

(1 BP) Blackheath	34 – 12	Plymouth Albion

Well Hall
Attendance: 372
Referee: Jamie Parr

24 February 2024
15:00

(1 BP) Chinnor	80 – 10	Taunton Titans

Kingsey Road
Attendance: 976
Referee: Alan Chandrachud

24 February 2024
15:00

(1 BP) Cinderford	40 – 34	Richmond (2 BP)

Beavis Memorial Ground
Attendance: 325
Referee: Ben Rayner

24 February 2024
15:00

(1 BP) Sale FC	37 – 31	Birmingham Moseley (2 BP)

Heywood Road
Attendance: 867
Referee: Timothy Allatt

=== Round 21 ===
8 March 2024
20:00

Richmond	22 – 13	Blackheath

Athletic Ground
Attendance: 1,028
Referee: Jamie Parr

9 March 2024
14:00

(1 BP) Rosslyn Park	35 – 7	Leicester Lions

The Rock
Attendance: 412
Referee: Neil Sweeney

9 March 2024
14:30

Plymouth Albion	5 – 26	Chinnor

The Brickfields
Attendance: 924
Referee: Adam Wookey

9 March 2024
14:30

(2 BP) Sedgley Park	31 – 34	Darlington Mowden Park (1 BP)

Park Lane
Attendance: 274
Referee: Timothy Allatt

9 March 2024
15:00

(1 BP) Birmingham Moseley	26 – 14	Cinderford

Billesley Common
Attendance: 950
Referee: Iain Kiy

9 March 2024
15:00

Rams	19 – 36	Sale FC (1 BP)

Old Bath Road
Attendance: 920
Referee: Alan Chandrachud

9 March 2024
15:00

(1 BP) Taunton Titans	26 – 45	Bishop's Stortford (1 BP)

Veritas Park
Attendance: 731
Referee: Matthew Sharpe

=== Round 22 ===
16 March 2024
14:00

(1 BP) Leicester Lions	29 – 21	Taunton Titans

Westleigh Park
Attendance: 326
Referee: Ben Rayner

16 March 2024
15:00

(1 BP) Blackheath	36 – 12	Birmingham Moseley

Well Hall
Attendance: 403
Referee: Alan Chandrachud

16 March 2024
15:00

(1 BP) Chinnor	80 – 10	Bishop's Stortford

Kingsey Road
Attendance: 1,089
Referee: Jamie Parr

16 March 2024
15:00

Cinderford	14 – 38	Rams (1 BP)

Beavis Memorial Ground
Attendance: 300
Referee: Matthew Sharpe

16 March 2024
15:00

(1 BP) Darlington Mowden Park	30 – 36	Rosslyn Park (1 BP)

Northern Echo Arena
Attendance: 831
Referee: Owen Taylor

16 March 2024
15:00

Plymouth Albion	18 – 10	Richmond

Brickfields
Attendance: 746
Referee: Iain Kiy

16 March 2024
15:00

(1 BP) Sale FC	35 – 24	Sedgley Park (1 BP)

Heywood Road
Attendance: 1,105
Referee: Benjamin Wood

=== Round 23 ===
23 March 2024
14:30

Sedgley Park	30 – 25	Cinderford (1 BP)

Park Lane
Attendance: 400
Referee: Callum Watson

23 March 2024
15:00

Birmingham Moseley	3 – 20	Plymouth Albion

Billesley Common
Attendance: 747
Referee: Owen Taylor

23 March 2024
15:00

(1 BP) Bishop's Stortford	39 – 12	Leicester Lions

Silver Leys
Attendance: 552
Referee: Ben Wood

23 March 2024
15:00

(1 BP) Rams	33 – 25	Blackheath (1 BP)

Old Bath Road
Attendance: 987
Referee: Ben Rayner

23 March 2024
15:00

Richmond	16 – 41	Chinnor (1 BP)

Athletic Ground
Attendance: 921
Referee: Owen Taylor

23 March 2024
15:00

(1 BP) Rosslyn Park	41 – 19	Sale FC

The Rock
Attendance: 554
Referee: Matthew Sharpe

23 March 2024
15:00

(1 BP) Taunton Titans	22 – 20	Darlington Mowden Park (1 BP)

Veritas Park
Attendance: 800
Referee: Iain Kiy

=== Round 24 ===
6 April 2024
15:00

Blackheath	25 – 15	Sedgley Park

Well Hall Road
Attendance: 467
Referee: Matt Sharpe

6 April 2024
15:00

(1 BP) Chinnor	42 – 12	Leicester Lions

Kingsey Road
Attendance: 1,876
Referee: Ben Rayner

6 April 2024
15:00

(1 BP) Cinderford	29 – 28	Rosslyn Park (2 BP)

Beavis Memorial Ground
Attendance: 408
Referee: Alan Chandrachud

6 April 2024
15:00

Darlington Mowden Park	17 – 13	Bishop's Stortford (1 BP)

Northern Echo Arena
Attendance: 922
Referee: Timothy Allatt

6 April 2024
15:00

(1 BP) Plymouth Albion	28 – 22	Rams (2 BP)

The Brickfields
Attendance: 1,642
Referee: Iain Kiy

6 April 2024
15:00

Richmond	17 – 17	Birmingham Moseley

Athletic Ground
Attendance: 725
Referee: Adam Wookey

6 April 2024
15:00

(1 BP) Sale FC	27 – 41	Taunton Titans (1 BP)

Heywood Road
Attendance: 891
Referee: Owen Taylor

=== Round 25 ===
13 April 2024
14:00

(1 BP) Leicester Lions	43 – 10	Darlington Mowden Park

Westleigh Park
Attendance: 376
Referee: Iain Kiy

13 April 2024
14:30

(1 BP) Sedgley Park	47 – 29	Plymouth Albion (1 BP)

Park Lane
Attendance: 501
Referee: Ben Rayner

13 April 2024
15:00

Birmingham Moseley	0 – 52	Chinnor (1 BP)

Billesley Common
Attendance: 950
Referee: Jamie Parr

- Chinnor are champions.

13 April 2024
15:00

Bishop's Stortford	22 – 19	Sale FC (1 BP)

Silver Leys
Attendance: 983
Referee: Alan Chandrachud

13 April 2024
15:00

Rams	19 – 13	Richmond (1 BP)

Old Bath Road
Attendance: 1,431
Referee: Matt Sharpe

13 April 2024
15:00

(1 BP) Rosslyn Park	29 – 29	Blackheath (1 BP)

The Rock
Attendance: 758
Referee: Callum Watson

13 April 2024
15:00

(1 BP) Taunton Titans	37 – 31	Cinderford (2 BP)

Veritas Park
Attendance: 1,393
Referee: Adam Wookey

=== Round 26 ===
27 April 2024
15:00

(1 BP) Birmingham Moseley	39 – 31	Rams (1 BP)

Billesley Common
Attendance: Adam Wookey
Referee: 1,112

27 April 2024
15:00

(1 BP) Blackheath	32 – 47	Taunton Titans (1 BP)

Well Hall Road
Attendance: 560
Referee: Alan Chandrachud

- Taunton Titans are relegated.

27 April 2024
15:00

(2 BP) Cinderford	22 – 27	Bishop's Stortford (1 BP)

Beavis Memorial Ground
Attendance: 500
Referee: Ben Rayner

- Cinderford are relegated.

27 April 2024
15:00

(2 BP) Darlington Mowden Park	40 – 42	Chinnor (1 BP)

Northern Echo Arena
Attendance: 978
Referee: Timothy Allatt

27 April 2024
15:00

(1 BP) Plymouth Albion	33 – 28	Rosslyn Park (2 BP)

The Brickfields
Attendance: 1,708
Referee: Matt Sharpe

27 April 2024
15:00

(1 BP) Richmond	50 – 18	Sedgley Park

Athletic Ground
Attendance: 812
Referee: Callum Watson

27 April 2024
15:00

Sale FC	14 – 23	Leicester Lions

Heywood Road
Attendance: 956
Referee: Jamie Parr

== Attendances ==
Club	Home games	Total	Average	Highest	Lowest	% Capacity
Birmingham Moseley	13	9,030	695	1,112	329	14%
Bishop's Stortford	13	7,189	553	983	300	35%
Blackheath	13	6,992	538	938	303	33%
Chinnor	13	13,299	1,023	2,270	311	41%
Cinderford	13	4,323	333	500	250	13%
Darlington Mowden Park	13	10,014	770	978	572	3%
Leicester Lions	13	3,692	284	397	160	14%
Plymouth Albion	13	15,644	1,203	1,708	746	14%
Rams	13	11,793	907	1,431	684	45%
Richmond	13	10,766	828	1,205	486	18%
Rosslyn Park	13	6,932	533	1,150	328	27%
Sale FC	13	10,141	780	1,105	402	23%
Sedgley Park	13	5,050	388	850	274	13%
Taunton Titans	13	9,554	735	1,393	339	37%

== Individual statistics ==
=== Top points scorers ===
Rank	Player	Team	Points
1	Warren Seals	Sedgley Park	229
2	Daniel Lewis	Leicester Lions	192
2	George Worboys	Chinnor	192
3	Fraser Honey	Rams	177
4	Tighe Maxwell-Whiteley	Birmingham Moseley	151
4	Joe Winfield	Cinderford	151
5	Thomas Putt	Plymouth Albion	145
6	Tom Ffitch	Blackheath	143
7	Max Hayman	Rams	130

=== Top try scorers ===
Rank	Player	Team	Tries
1	Max Hayman	Rams	26
2	Alun Walker	Chinnor	20
3	Noah Fenton	Taunton Titans	19
3	Charles Walker	Rosslyn Park	19
3	Charlie Wright	Taunton Titans	19
4	Morgan Passman	Chinnor	18
5	Chris Smith	Bishop's Stortford	16
5	Aquile Smith	Birmingham Moseley	16
6	Alexander Post	Richmond	15

== See also ==
- 2023–24 National League 2 North
- 2023–24 National League 2 East
- 2023–24 National League 2 West
