= St Anne's Church, Ellerker =

Church in Ellerker, East Riding of Yorkshire, England

Coordinates: 53°45′11″N 0°36′12″W

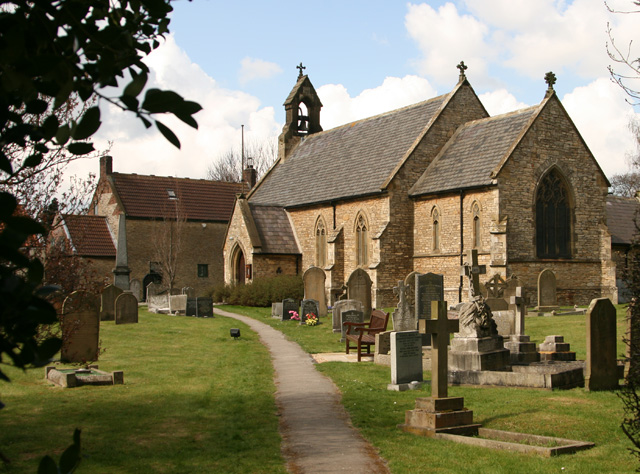
The church, in 2008

St Anne's Church is the parish church of Ellerker, a village in the East Riding of Yorkshire, in England.

Ellerker was long in the parish of All Saints' Church, Brantingham. A chapel of ease in the village was first recorded in 1101. It was demolished and a new church constructed between 1843 and 1844, reusing the chancel arch of the former building, and much of its stone. It was the first church to be designed by John Loughborough Pearson, and was the first of several churches he designed in the East Riding, in the Gothic revival style. The building was grade II listed in 1968. Historic England describes the interior as "very simple".

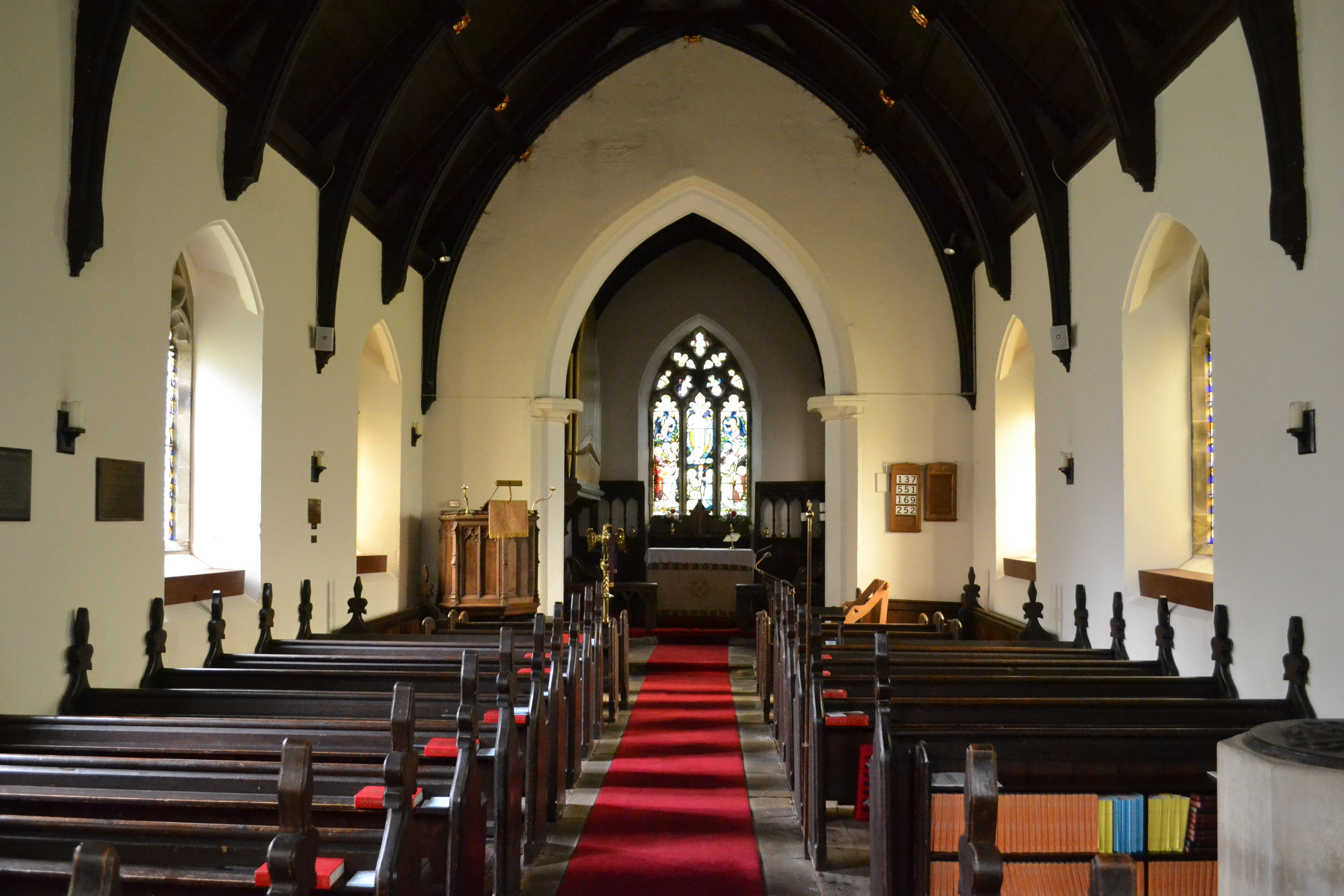
Interior of the church

The church is built of stone with slate roofs, and consists of a nave, a south porch, and a lower chancel. On the west gable is a bellcote with a pointed opening, a gablet, and a cross finial. The pointed east window has three lights and a hood mould.

== See also ==
- Listed buildings in Ellerker
