= Listed buildings in Brantingham =

Brantingham is a civil parish in the county of the East Riding of Yorkshire, England. It contains eight listed buildings that are recorded in the National Heritage List for England. Of these, one is listed at Grade II*, the middle of the three grades, and the others are at Grade II, the lowest grade. The parish contains the village of Brantingham and the surrounding countryside. Most of the listed buildings are houses and associated structures, and the others consist of a church and a war memorial.

== Key ==
Grade	Criteria
II*	Particularly important buildings of more than special interest
II	Buildings of national importance and special interest

== Buildings ==
Name and location	Photograph	Date	Notes	Grade
All Saints' Church; 53.75861°N 0.56996°W		12th century	The church was largely rebuilt in 1867 by G. E. Street reusing older materials. It is built in limestone with a pantile roof. The church consists of a nave, a south porch, north and south transepts, a chancel and a west tower. The tower has two stages, a low chamfered plinth, a two-light pointed west window with a hood mould, a polygonal stair turret in the southeast corner, string courses, and two-light bell openings, above which are gargoyles, and an embattled parapet with crocketed corner pinnacles. The nave and the porch also have embattled parapets.	II*
Brantinghamthorpe; 53.75012°N 0.56962°W	—	Late 17th century	A country house that was much extended by George Devey between 1868 and 1876. It is in limestone, with freestone dressings, a moulded cornice, a balustraded parapet, and a hipped slate roof with a shaped gable. The original block has two storeys and five bays with a central two-storey projecting porch, a five-bay extension on the left, and a single-bay extension on the right. The porch is flanked by polygonal bay windows, and above the porch is an oriel window and a heraldic plaque. The other windows are mullioned and transomed. On the roof is a bell turret with a hexagonal cupola, a shaped pyramidal dome, a ball finial and an elaborate wrought iron weathervane.	II
Brantingham Hall; 53.75496°N 0.57439°W		c. 1765	The house is in red brick, with modillion eaves, raked cornices, and a pantile roof with raised coped gables and shaped kneelers. There are three storeys, five bays, and a two-storey three-bay rear wing with a two-span roof. The middle bay on the front projects slightly under a low pediment, and contains an Ionic doorcase with fluted pilasters, a pulvinated frieze, dentilled eaves, raked cornices and a pediment, and the doorway has a fanlight. The windows are sashes under flat gauged brick arches, the windows above the doorway with bracketed sills. On the rear wings are roof dormers with catslide roofs.	II
Hall Farmhouse; 53.75475°N 0.57511°W	—	Late 18th century	The house is in limestone, with brick dressings, a stepped brick eaves cornice, and a pantile roof with tumbled-in brickwork on raised gables. There are two storeys and attics, three bays, and a single-storey two-bay extension on the left. On the front is a projecting closed timber porch, the windows are sashes, and there are two roof dormers.	II
Rose Cottage; 53.75506°N 0.57310°W		Late 18th century	The house is in limestone, with brick dressings, and a pantile roof with tumbled-in brick on raised gables. There are two storeys and three bays, and a rear wing. In the centre is an open rustic porch and a doorway, and the windows are sashes under flat arches.	II
43 and 45 Cave Road; 53.73763°N 0.58377°W	—	Mid-19th century	A pair of mirror-image houses in painted concrete, with a roof partly in tile and partly in Welsh slate. There are two storeys and attics, and each house has two bays. The inner two bays have gables, bargeboards and finials, and the outer two bays are recessed with overhanging eaves. The outer bays contain a doorway, and the windows are casements with latticed glazing; all the openings have moulded hood moulds.	II
Gateway and walls, Brantinghamthorpe; 53.74986°N 0.57018°W	—	Mid to late 19th century	The buildings are in stone. The gateway has a round head, with a dropped and fluted keystone, Ionic pilasters, fleur-de-lis in the left spandrel, the Rose of England in the right spandrel, a pulvinated frieze, a modillion cornice, and a scrolled pediment with obelisks and finials. On the right, the wall has a balustraded parapet on scrolled consoles, and the left wall has a ramped coped parapet. On the far left is a rusticated pier with a moulded cornice and a giant urn. The wall is coped and contains dwarf piers, and large re-set early 18th century mythological panels.	II
War Memorial and screen wall 53.75234°N 0.57598°W		1922	The war memorial has been constructed with material from the demolished Hull Town Hall. It is mainly in limestone, with red sandstone and polished red granite. There is a square plinth with granite cartouches, on which are four granite Composite columns around a limestone block with a bronze plaque containing the names of those lost in the First World War. Above this is a moulded cornice, with a Corinthian column in the centre and polygonal tapering finials on the corners. At the rear is a screen wall containing panels with rosettes and oeils-de-boeuf, between which are horizontal tapering columns. At the ends are polygonal abutments with tapering polygonal finials.	II
