= Listed buildings in Ellerker =

Ellerker is a civil parish in the county of the East Riding of Yorkshire, England. It contains five listed buildings that are recorded in the National Heritage List for England. All the listed buildings are designated at Grade II, the lowest of the three grades, which is applied to "buildings of national importance and special interest". The parish contains the village of Ellerker and the surrounding area. All the listed buildings are in the village, and consist of houses and a church.

== Buildings ==
Name and location	Photograph	Date	Notes
Garth Farmhouse; 53.75108°N 0.60609°W	—	Mid-18th century	The farmhouse is in limestone on a plinth, with brick dressings, and a tile roof with coped gables on shaped kneelers. There are two storeys and five bays. In the centre is a canted bay window, the doorway is to the right, and the windows are sashes below flat brick arches.
Elmsall House; 53.75381°N 0.60395°W	—	Mid to late 18th century	The house is in red brick, with stone on the rear wing, a timber modillion eaves cornice, and a pantile roof with raised coped gables on shaped kneelers. There are two storeys, three bays, and a rear wing. The middle bay projects slightly and contains a doorway with pilasters, panelled reveals and soffit, and a dentilled pediment. The windows are sashes under gauged brick arches.
The Hall; 53.75355°N 0.60539°W	—	Mid to late 18th century	The house has two ranges, the rear is the older, the front range was added in about 1800, and a room was added to the right in the late 19th century. The house is pebbledashed, rendered and colourwashed with stone dressings, the earlier range has a pantile roof, and the later parts have slate roofs. The front range has two storeys, five bays, a plinth, rusticated quoins, a floor band, a moulded eaves cornice, a low pediment and a hipped roof. In the centre is a full-height canted bay window, to its right is a porch with panelled piers and a doorway with a fanlight, and the windows are sashes in shouldered architraves.
Mill Cottage; 53.75369°N 0.60419°W	—	Late 18th century (probable)	The house is in limestone with brick dressings, a stepped brick eaves cornice, and a pantile roof with tumbled-in brick on the raised gables. On the left is a doorway, and the windows are horizontally sliding sashes.
St Anne's Church; 53.75304°N 0.60330°W		1843–44	The church was the first to be designed by J. L. Pearson. It is built in stone with slate roofs, and consists of a nave, a south porch, and a lower chancel. On the west gable is a bellcote with a pointed opening, a gablet, and a cross finial. The pointed east window has three lights and a hood mould.
