= 2022–23 National League 2 North =

Rugby union competition in England

- Countries: England
- Date: 3 September 2022 – 6 May 2023
- Champions: Sedgley Park (1st title)
- Runners-up: Fylde
- Relegated: Harrogate; Blaydon
- Matches played: 180
- Attendance: 58,114 (average 323 per match)
- Highest attendance: 1,042 – Fylde v Sedgley Park, 4 March 2023
- Lowest attendance: 100 – Harrogate v Blaydon, 4 February 2023; Harrogate v Chester, 4 March 2023; Harrogate v Huddersfield, 18 March, 2023
- Tries scored: 1237 (average 6.9 per match)
- Top point scorer: 267 – Richard Hayes (Rotherham Titans)
- Top try scorer: 23 – Rhys Henderson (Sedgley Park)

The 2022–23 National League 2 North was the 35th season of the fourth tier (north) of the English domestic rugby union competitions; one of three at this level. The others are, the newly formed, National League 2 East and National League 2 West. Previously, there were two leagues at level four; this league and National League 2 South.

Sedgley Park became champions with one match to play and are promoted to National League One, while Blaydon and Harrogate are relegated to Regional 1 North East.

== Structure ==
The league consists of fourteen teams and each play the others on a home and away basis, to make a total of 26 matches each. The champions are promoted to National League 1 and the last two teams are relegated to Regional 1 North East or Regional 1 North West; depending on their location.

The results of the matches contribute points to the league as follows:

- 4 points are awarded for a win
- 2 points are awarded for a draw
- 0 points are awarded for a loss, however
- 1 losing (bonus) point is awarded to a team that loses a match by 7 points or fewer
- 1 additional (bonus) point is awarded to a team scoring 4 tries or more in a match.

=== Participating teams and locations ===
Locations of the 2022–23 National League 2 North teams

Eleven of last season’s sixteen teams played in this season’s competition. Hull, as last season’s champions, were promoted, and four teams were transferred to the newly formed National League 2 West; Bournville, Loughborough Students, Luctonians and Stourbridge. Three teams were promoted into the league; Otley and Preston Grasshoppers from the North Premier and Sheffield RUFC from the Midlands Premier. There was no relegation and Huddersfield (15th) and Harrogate (16th) continued to play at this level.

Team	Ground	Capacity	City/Area	Previous season
Blaydon	Crow Trees	2,000 (400 seats)	Swalwell, Tyne and Wear	14th
Chester	Hare Lane	2,000 (500 seats)	Chester, Cheshire	11th
Fylde	Woodlands Memorial Ground	7,500 (500 seats)	Lytham St. Annes, Lancashire	5th
Harrogate	Rudding Lane	2,000	Harrogate, North Yorkshire	16th
Huddersfield	Lockwood Park	1,500 (500 seats)	Huddersfield, West Yorkshire	15th
Hull Ionians	Brantingham Park	1,500 (240 seats)	Brantingham, East Riding	6th
Otley	Cross Green	7,000 (852 seats)	Otley, Leeds, West Yorkshire	Promoted from North Premier (1st)
Preston Grasshoppers	Lightfoot Green	2,250 (250 seats)	Preston, Lancashire	Promoted from North Premier (2nd)
Rotherham Titans	Clifton Lane	2,500	Rotherham, South Yorkshire	3rd
Sedgley Park	Park Lane	3,000	Whitefield, Bury, Greater Manchester	2nd
Sheffield	Abbeydale Park	3,300 (100 seats)	Sheffield, South Yorkshire	Promoted from Midlands Premier (2nd)
Sheffield Tigers	Dore Moor	1,000	Sheffield, South Yorkshire	9th
Tynedale	Tynedale Park	2,000 (400 seats)	Corbridge, Northumberland	7th
Wharfedale	The Avenue	2,000	Threshfield, North Yorkshire	12th

== League table ==
2022–23 National League 2 North table
Pos	Team	Pld	W	D	L	PF	PA	PD	TB	LB	Pts	Qualification
1	Sedgley Park (C, P)	26	24	1	1	931	384	+547	19	1	118	Promoted
2	Fylde	25	21	1	3	849	401	+448	19	1	106	
3	Hull Ionians	26	19	0	7	850	610	+240	16	3	95	
4	Rotherham Titans	26	15	0	11	810	570	+240	15	5	80	
5	Otley	25	15	0	10	594	553	+41	11	6	77	
6	Tynedale	26	13	0	13	594	674	−80	10	7	69	
7	Chester	26	13	0	13	620	629	−9	9	6	67	
8	Wharfedale	26	10	0	16	602	574	+28	9	10	59	
9	Sheffield Tigers	26	11	0	15	510	660	−150	6	6	56	
10	Sheffield	26	9	0	17	605	679	−74	11	5	52	
11	Preston Grasshoppers	26	8	1	17	543	725	−182	9	8	51	
12	Huddersfield	25	11	0	14	530	690	−160	6	5	50 (Note: Huddersfield were deducted 5 points)	
13	Blaydon (R)	25	4	1	20	416	907	−491	8	3	24 (Note: Blaydon were deducted 5 points)	Relegated
14	Harrogate (R)	26	5	0	21	418	816	−398	4	4	28	Relegated

Updated to match(es) played on 29 April 2023. Source: National League 2 East RFU
Rules for classification: If teams are level at any stage, tiebreakers are applied in the following order:
1. Number of matches won
2. Difference between points for and against
3. Total number of points for
4. Aggregate number of points scored in matches between tied teams
5. Number of matches won excluding the first match, then the second and so on until the tie is settled
  (C) Champion; (P) Promoted; (R) Relegated
  Notes:

== Fixtures & results ==
Fixtures for the season were announced by the RFU on 13 June 2022.

=== Round 1 ===
3 September 2022
14:00

(1 BP) Rotherham Titans	67 – 15	Harrogate

Clifton Lane
Attendance: 252
Referee: Matt Sharpe

3 September 2022
14:15

(1 BP) Huddersfield	15 – 20	Sheffield Tigers

Lockwood Park
Attendance: 215
Referee: Peter Connor

3 September 2022
14:30

(1 BP) Sedgley Park	38 – 15	Otley

Park Lane
Attendance: 301
Referee: Nathan Howarth

3 September 2022
15:00

Blaydon	21 – 34	Hull Ionians (1 BP)

Crow Trees
Attendance: 145
Referee: Dn Wood

3 September 2022
15:00

(1 BP) Fylde	34 – 29	Chester (1 BP)

Woodlands Memorial Ground
Attendance: 540
Referee: James O'Brien

3 September 2022
15:00

(1 BP) Tynedale	36 – 14	Sheffield

Tynedale Park
Attendance: 215
Referee: David Charlton

3 September 2022
15:00

(1 BP) Wharfedale	57 – 18	Preston Grasshoppers

The Avenue
Attendance: 535
Referee: Michael Harris

=== Round 2 ===
10 September 2022
15:00

(2 BP) Blaydon	26 – 30	Tynedale

Crow Trees
Attendance: 578
Referee: Owen Taylor

10 September 2022
15:00

(1 BP) Chester	19 – 20	Sedgley Park

Hare Lane
Attendance: 301
Referee: Nathan Howarth

10 September 2022
15:00

Harrogate	7 – 24	Wharfdale (1 BP)

Rudding Lane
Attendance: 313
Referee: David Charlton

10 September 2022
15:00

Hull Ionians	27 – 22	Rotherham Titans (1 BP)

Brantingham Park
Attendance: 353
Referee: Tim Allatt

10 September 2022
15:00

Otley	25 – 22	Huddersfield (1 BP)

Cross Green
Attendance: 250
Referee: David Jones

10 September 2022
15:00

Preston Grasshoppers	6 – 22	Fylde (1 BP)

Lightfoot Green
Attendance: 289
Referee: Ben Davis

10 September 2022
15:00

Sheffield Tigers	14 – 35	Sheffield (1 BP)

Dore Moor
Attendance: 448
Referee: Gavin Jones

=== Round 3 ===
17 September 2022
14:00

(1 BP) Rotherham Titans	50 – 3	Blaydon

Clifton Lane
Attendance: 259
Referee: Alex Rose

17 September 2022
14:15

(1 BP) Huddersfield	17 – 23	Chester

Lockwood Park
Attendance: 196
Referee: Daniel Rowlands

17 September 2022
14:30

(1 BP) Sedgley Park	50 – 8	Preston Grasshoppers

Park Lane
Attendance: 202
Referee: James O'Brien

17 September 2022
15:00

(1 BP) Fylde	74 – 5	Harrogate

Woodlands Memorial Ground
Attendance: 462
Referee: David Charlton

17 September 2022
15:00

Sheffield	20 – 18	Otley (1 BP)

Abbeydale Park
Attendance: 856
Referee: Peter Caunt

17 September 2022
15:00

(1 BP) Tynedale	41 – 34	Sheffield Tigers (2 BP)

Tynedale Park
Attendance: 211
Referee: Daniel Woods

17 September 2022
15:00

(1 BP) Wharfedale	13 – 20	Hull Ionians

The Avenue
Attendance: 525
Referee: Timothy Allatt

=== Round 4 ===
24 September 2022
14:00

(1 BP) Rotherham Titans	37 – 7	Tynedale

Clifton Lane
Attendance: 251
Referee: Llyr ApGeraint-Roberts

24 September 2022
14:30

(1 BP) Preston Grasshoppers	32 – 12	Huddersfield

Lightfoot Green
Attendance: 198
Referee: Nathan Howarth

24 September 2022
15:00

Blaydon	7 – 46	Wharfedale (1 BP)

Crow Trees
Attendance: 167
Referee: Jonathan Cook

24 September 2022
15:00

Chester	8 – 5	Sheffield (1 BP)

Hare Lane
Attendance: 250
Referee: Benjamin Davis

24 September 2022
15:00

Harrogate	10 – 41	Sedgley Park (1 BP)

Rudding Lane
Attendance: 199
Referee: Peter Connor

24 September 2022
15:00

(2 BP) Hull Ionians	31 – 34	Fylde (1 BP)

Brantingham Park
Attendance: 301
Referee: Daniel Woods

24 September 2022
15:00

(1 BP) Otley	24 – 8	Sheffield Tigers

Cross Green
Attendance: 175
Referee: Michael Harris

=== Round 5 ===
1 October 2022
14:15

Huddersfield	15 – 29	Harrogate (1 BP)

Lockwood Park
Attendance: 150
Referee: Michael Harris

1 October 2022
14:30

Sedgley Park	18 – 10	Hull Ionians

Park Lane
Attendance: 257
Referee: Benjamin Davis

1 October 2022
15:00

(1 BP) Fylde	42 – 7	Blaydon

Woodlands Memorial Ground
Attendance: 517
Referee: Nathan Howarth

1 October 2022
15:00

(1 BP) Sheffield	38 – 17	Preston Grasshoppers

Abbeydale Park
Attendance: 245
Referee: Timothy Allatt

1 October 2022
15:00

Sheffield Tigers	15 – 39	Chester (1 BP)

Dore Moor
Attendance: 168
Referee: David Charlton

1 October 2022
15:00

(1 BP) Tynedale	22 – 25	Otley

Tynedale Park
Attendance: 202
Referee: Owen Taylor

1 October 2022
15:00

(1 BP) Wharfedale	23 – 29	Rotherham Titans (1 BP)

The Avenue
Attendance: 535
Referee: Daniel Woods

=== Rescheduled match ===
8 October 2022
15:00

(1 BP) Otley	10 – 15	Hull Ionians

Cross Green
Attendance: 250
Referee: Llyr Apgeriant-Roberts

=== Round 6 ===
15 October 2022
14:00

Rotherham Titans	16 – 41	Fylde (1 BP)

Clifton Lane
Attendance: 405
Referee: Ben Rayner

15 October 2022
14:30

Preston Grasshoppers	24 – 18	Sheffield Tigers (1 BP)

Lightfoot Green
Attendance: 250
Referee: James O'Brien

15 October 2022
15:00

Blaydon	15 – 42	Sedgley Park (1 BP)

Crow Trees
Attendance: 142
Referee: Daniel Woods

15 October 2022
15:00

(1 BP) Chester	22 – 24	Otley (1 BP)

Hare Lane
Attendance: 350
Referee: Nathan Howarth

15 October 2022
15:00

Harrogate	22 – 47	Sheffield (1 BP)

Rudding Lane
Attendance: 150
Referee: Llyr ApGeraint-Roberts

15 October 2022
15:00

(1 BP) Hull Ionians	58 – 17	Huddersfield

Brantingham Park
Attendance: 245
Referee: Gavin Jones

15 October 2022
15:00

(1 BP) Wharfedale	22 – 29	Tynedale (1 BP)

The Avenue
Attendance: 427
Referee: Michael Harris

=== Round 7 ===
22 October 2022
14:15

(1 BP) Huddersfield	24 – 7	Blaydon

Lockwood Park
Attendance: 266
Referee: Benjamin Davis

22 October 2022
14:30

Sedgley Park	25 – 17	Rotherham Titans

Park Lane
Attendance: 211
Referee: Benjamin Wood

22 October 2022
15:00

(1 BP) Fylde	43 – 3	Wharfedale

Woodlands Memorial Ground
Attendance: 583
Referee: Geraint Roberts

22 October 2022
15:00

(1 BP) Otley	28 – 15	Preston Grasshoppers

Cross Green
Attendance: 250
Referee: Daniel Woods

22 October 2022
15:00

(1 BP) Sheffield	19 – 26	Hull Ionians (1 BP)

Abbeydale Park
Attendance: 231
Referee: Peter Connor

22 October 2022
15:00

Sheffield Tigers	16 – 10	Harrogate (1 BP)

Dore Moor
Attendance: 202
Referee: Galvin Jones

22 October 2022
15:00

(1 BP) Tynedale	14 – 21	Chester

Tynedale Park
Attendance: 211
Referee: David Charlton

=== Round 8 ===
29 October 2022
14:00

(1 BP) Rotherham Titans	27 – 3	Huddersfield

Clifton Lane
Attendance: 292
Referee: Jamie Parr

29 October 2022
14:30

Preston Grasshoppers	13 – 29	Chester (1 BP)

Lightfoot Green
Attendance: 257
Referee: Peter Connor

29 October 2022
15:00

(1 BP) Blaydon	32 – 19	Sheffield

Crow Trees
Attendance: 178
Referee: Michael Harris

29 October 2022
15:00

(1 BP) Fylde	43 – 10	Tynedale

Woodlands Memorial Ground
Attendance: 452
Referee: Daniel Woods

29 October 2022
15:00

(1 BP) Harrogate	10 – 16	Otley

Rudding Lane
Attendance: 250
Referee: Benjamin Davis

29 October 2022
15:00

(1 BP) Hull Ionians	34 – 16	Sheffield Tigers

Brantingham Park
Attendance: 202
Referee: David Charlton

29 October 2022
15:00

Wharfedale	6 – 15	Sedgley Park

The Avenue
Attendance: 372
Referee: Nathan Howarth

=== Round 9 ===
5 November 2022
14:00

(1 BP) Sheffield Tigers	34 – 22	Blaydon (1 BP)

Dore Moor
Attendance: 311
Referee: Daniel Woods

5 November 2022
14:00

Tynedale	17 – 12	Preston Grasshoppers (1 BP)

Tynedale Park
Attendance: 320
Referee: Ben Rayner

5 November 2022
14:15

Huddersfield	20 – 14	Wharfedale (1 BP)

Lockwood Park
Attendance: 262
Referee: Connor Boyle

5 November 2022
14:15

Sheffield	14 – 39	Rotherham Titans (1 BP)

Abbeydale Park
Attendance: 623
Referee: Benjamin Davis

5 November 2022
14:30

Sedgley Park	30 – 20	Fylde

Park Lane
Attendance: 400
Referee: Timothy Allatt

5 November 2022
15:00

(1 BP) Chester	45 – 19	Harrogate

Hare Lane
Attendance: 400
Referee: Owen Taylor

=== Round 10 ===
12 November 2022
14:00

Harrogate	23 – 17	Preston Grasshoppers (1 BP)

Rudding Lane
Attendance: 258
Referee: MIchael Harris

12 November 2022
14:00

(1 BP) Hull Ionians	26 – 10	Chester

Brantingham Park
Attendance: 351
Referee: Timothy Allatt

12 November 2022
14:00

(1 BP) Rotherham Titans	14 – 19	Sheffield Tigers

Clifton Lane
Attendance: 325
Referee: James Dowds

12 November 2022
14:00

(1 BP) Wharfedale	26 – 22	Sheffield (2 BP)

The Avenue
Attendance: 409
Referee: Daniel Woods

12 November 2022
14:30

(1 BP) Sedgley Park	33 – 28	Tynedale (2 BP)

Park Lane
Attendance: 378
Referee: Llyr ApGeraint-Roberts

12 November 2022
15:00

Blaydon	12 – 28	Otley

Crow Trees
Attendance: 178
Referee: David Charlton

12 November 2022
15:00

(1 BP) Fylde	57 – 14	Huddersfield

Woodlands Memorial Ground
Attendance: 480
Referee: Benjamin Davis

=== Round 11 ===
26 November 2022
14:00

(1 BP) Otley	39 – 26	Rotherham Titans (1 BP)

Cross Green
Attendance: 260
Referee: Michael Harris

26 November 2022
14:00

Sheffield Tigers	34 – 14	Wharfedale

Dore Moor
Attendance: 250
Referee: Tim Allatt

26 November 2022
14:00

Tynedale	15 – 8	Harrogate (1 BP)

Tynedale Park
Attendance: 385
Referee: Nathan Howarth

26 November 2022
14:15

(1 BP) Huddersfield	26 – 38	Sedgley Park (1 BP)

Lockwood Park
Attendance: 208
Referee: Daniel Woods

26 November 2022
14:15

Sheffield	5 – 24	Fylde

Abbeydale Park
Attendance: 356
Referee: Ben Rayner

26 November 2022
14:30

(1 BP) Preston Grasshoppers	20 – 21	Hull Ionians

Lightfoot Green
Attendance: 221
Referee: Ben Davis

26 November 2022
15:00

(1 BP) Chester	31 – 19	Blaydon

Hare Lane
Attendance: 300
Referee: Henry Pearson

=== Round 12 ===
3 December 2022
14:00

(1 BP) Hull Ionians	24 – 17	Harrogate (1 BP)

Brantingham Park
Attendance: 275
Referee: Daniel Woods

3 December 2022
14:00

Rotherham Titans	26 – 21	Chester (1 BP)

Clifton Lane
Attendance: 253
Referee: David Charlton

3 December 2022
14:00

(1 BP) Wharfedale	27 – 28	Otley

The Avenue
Attendance: 580
Referee: Benjamin Davis

3 December 2022
14:15

(1 BP) Huddersfield	38 – 14	Tynedale

Lockwood Park
Attendance: 214
Referee: Llyr ApGeraint-Roberts

3 December 2022
14:30

(1 BP) Sedgley Park	47 – 17	Sheffield

Park Lane
Attendance: 300
Referee: Timothy Allatt

3 December 2022
15:00

Blaydon	22 – 22	Preston Grasshoppers

Crow Trees
Attendance: 215
Referee: Michael Harris

3 December 2022
15:00

Fylde	20 – 11	Sheffield Tigers

Woodlands Memorial Ground
Attendance: 583
Referee: James O'Brien

=== Round 13 ===
10 December 2022
14:00

Harrogate	P – P	Blaydon

Rudding Lane

10 December 2022
14:00

Otley	P – P	Fylde

Cross Green

10 December 2022
14:00

Sheffield Tigers	P – P	Sedgley Park

Dore Moor

10 December 2022
14:00

Tynedale	P – P	Hull Ionians

Tynedale Park

10 December 2022
14:15

Sheffield	P – P	Huddersfield

Abbeydale Park

10 December 2022
14:30

Preston Grasshoppers	21 – 16	Rotherham Titans (1 BP)

Lightfoot Green
Attendance: 247
Referee: James O'Brien

10 December 2022
15:00

Chester	24 – 22	Wharfedale (1 BP)

Hare Lane
Attendance: 336
Referee: Llyr Apgeraint-Robertd

=== Round 14 ===
17 December 2022
14:00

Rotherham Titans	P – P	Hull Ionians

Clifton Lane

17 December 2022
14:00

Tynedale	P – P	Blaydon

Tynedale Park

17 December 2022
14:00

Wharfedale	P – P	Harrogate

The Avenue

17 December 2022
14:15

Huddersfield	P – P	Otley

Lockwood Park

17 December 2022
14:15

Sheffield	P – P	Sheffield Tigers

Dore Moor

17 December 2022
14:30

Sedgley Park	P – P	Chester

Park Lane

17 December 2022
15:00

Fylde	P – P	Preston Grasshoppers

Woodlands Memorial Ground

=== Round 15 ===
7 January 2023
14:00

Harrogate	0 – 52	Fylde (1 BP)

Rudding Lane
Attendance: 200
Referee: Michael Harris

7 January 2023
14:00

(1 BP) Hull Ionians	37 – 24	Wharfedale (1 BP)

Brantingham Park
Attendance: 250
Referee: Daniel Woods

7 January 2023
14:00

(1 BP) Otley	25 – 3	Sheffield

Cross Green
Attendance: 200
Referee: Llyr ApGerriant-Roberts

7 January 2023
14:00

(1 BP) Sheffield Tigers	26 – 7	Tynedale

Dore Moor
Attendance: 467
Referee: Peter Connor

7 January 2023
14:30

Preston Grasshoppers	7 – 46	Sedgley Park (1 BP)

Lightfoot Green
Attendance: 473
Referee: Banjamin Davis

7 January 2023
15:00

Blaydon	19 – 47	Rotherham Titans (1 BP)

Crow Trees
Attendance: 232
Referee: David Charlton

7 January 2023
15:00

(1 BP) Chester	19 – 20	Huddersfield

Hare Lane
Attendance: 250
Referee: James O'Brien

=== Round 16 ===
14 January 2023
14:00

Sheffield Tigers	P – P	Otley

Dore Moor

14 January 2023
14:00

Tynedale	25 – 10	Rotherham Titans

Tynedale Park
Attendance: 325
Referee: Michael Harris

14 January 2023
14:00

Wharfedale	22 – 3	Blaydon

The Avenue
Attendance: 268
Referee: Ben Davis

14 January 2023
14:15

Huddersfield	19 – 13	Preston Grasshoppers (1 BP)

Lockwood Park
Attendance: 233
Referee: David Charlton

14 January 2023
14:15

(1 BP) Sheffield	7 – 10	Chester

Abbeydale Park
Attendance: 456
Referee: Nathan Howarth

14 January 2023
14:30

(1 BP) Sedgley Park	39 – 7	Harrogate

Park Lane
Attendance: 200
Referee: James O'Brien

14 January 2023
15:00

Fylde	22– 15	Hull Ionians (1 BP)

Woodlands Memorial Ground
Attendance: 628
Referee: Tim Allat

=== Round 17 ===
21 January 2023
14:00

Chester	23 – 17	Sheffield Tigers (1 BP)

Hare Lane
Attendance: 300
Referee: Llyr ApGeraint-Roberts

21 January 2023
14:00

Harrogate	P – P	Huddersfield

Rudding Lane

21 January 2023
14:00

Hull Ionians	P – P	Sedgley Park

Brantingham Park

21 January 2023
14:00

Otley	P – P	Tynedale

Cross Green

21 January 2023
14:00

Rotherham Titans	P – P	Wharfedale

Clifton Lane

21 January 2023
14:30

(1 BP) Preston Grasshoppers	18 – 24	Sheffield (1 BP)

Lightfoot Green
Attendance: 322
Referee: Nathan Howarth

21 January 2023
15:00

Blaydon	12 – 31	Fylde (1 BP)

Crow Trees
Attendance: 205
Referee: Daniel Woods

=== Round 18 ===
28 January 2023
14:00

(1 BP) Otley	36 – 22	Chester

Cross Green
Attendance: 241
Referee: Daniel Woods

28 January 2023
14:00

(1 BP) Sheffield Tigers	34 – 22	Preston Grasshoppers (1 BP)

Dore Moor
Attendance: 500
Referee: Ben Davis

28 January 2023
14:00

Tynedale	21 – 20	Wharfedale (1 BP)

Tynedale Park
Attendance: 540
Referee: David Charlton

28 January 2023
14:15

(1 BP) Huddersfield	33 – 17	Hull Ionians

Lockwood Park
Attendance: 223
Referee: Benjamin Davis

28 January 2023
14:15

Sheffield	21 – 10	Harrogate

Abbeydale Park
Attendance: 654
Referee: Michael Harris

28 January 2023
14:30

(1 BP) Sedgley Park	75 – 0	Blaydon

Park Lane
Attendance: 300
Referee: Nathan Howarth

28 January 2023
15:00

(1 BP) Fylde	30 – 23	Rotherham Titans (! BP)

Woodlands Memorial Ground
Attendance: 547
Referee: Geraint Roberts

=== Rescheduled matches ===
4 February 2023
14:00

(1 BP) Harrogate	43 – 0	Blaydon

Rudding Lane
Attendance: 100
Referee: Peter Connor

4 February 2023
14:00

(1 BP) Otley	28 – 27	Fylde (2 BP)

Cross Green
Attendance: 212
Referee: George Ounsley

4 February 2023
14:00

(1 BP) Rotherham Titans	20 – 27	Wharfedale

Clifton Lane
Attendance: 247
Referee: Michael Harris

4 February 2023
14:00

Sheffield Tigers	3 – 26	Sedgley Park (1 BP)

Dore Moor
Attendance: 432
Referee: Daniel Woods

4 February 2023
14:00

Tynedale	21 – 36	Hull Ionians (1 BP)

Tynedale Park
Attendance: 180
Referee: Ben Davis

4 February 2023
14:15

(2 BP) Sheffield	24 – 26	Huddersfield

Abbeydale Park
Attendance: 250
Referee: David Charlton

=== Round 14 (rescheduled matches) ===
11 February 2023
14:00

(1 BP) Rotherham Titans	52 – 25	Hull Ionians

Clifton Lane
Attendance: 267
Referee: Nathan Howarth

11 February 2023
14:00

(2 BP) Tynedale	24 – 31	Blaydon (1 BP)

Tynedale Park
Attendance: 475
Referee: Daniel Woods

11 February 2023
14:00

Wharfedale	21 – 11	Harrogate

The Avenue
Attendance: 575
Referee: George Ounsley

11 February 2023
14:15

(1 BP) Huddersfield	22 – 29	Otley (1 BP)

Lockwood Park
Attendance: 245
Referee: David Charlton

11 February 2023
14:15

Sheffield	21 – 30	Sheffield Tigers

Abbeydale Park
Attendance: 436
Referee: Ben Davies

11 February 2023
14:30

(1 BP) Sedgley Park	31 – 18	Chester

Park Lane
Attendance: 150
Referee: Michael Harris

11 February 2023
15:00

(1 BP) Fylde	32 – 29	Preston Grasshoppers (2 BP)

Woodlands Memorial Ground
Attendance: 786
Referee: James O'Brien

=== Round 19 ===
18 February 2023
14:00

Harrogate	18 – 7	Sheffield Tigers

Rudding Lane
Attendance: 125
Referee: David Charlton

18 February 2023
14:00

(1 BP) Hull Ionians	41 – 30	Sheffield (1 BP)

Brantingham Park
Attendance: 202
Referee: Peter Connor

18 February 2023
14:00

Rotherham Titans	20 – 38	Sedgley Park (1 BP)

Clifton Lane
Attendance: 329
Referee: Ben Rayner

18 February 2023
14:00

Wharfedale	6 – 24	Fylde (1 BP)

The Avenue
Attendance: 435
Referee: Owen Taylor

18 February 2023
14:30

Preston Grasshoppers	28 – 25	Otley (2 BP)

Lightfoot Green
Attendance: 202
Referee: Gavin Jones

18 February 2023
15:00

(1 BP) Blaydon	13 – 19	Huddersfield

Crow Trees
Attendance: 205
Referee: Michael Harris

18 February 2023
15:00

(1 BP) Chester	29 – 27	Tynedale (1 BP)

Hare Lane
Attendance: 400
Referee: Ben Davies

=== Round 20 ===
25 February 2023
14:00

(1 BP) Otley	31 – 13	Harrogate

Cross Green
Attendance: 553
Referee: Ben Davies

25 February 2023
14:00

(1 BP) Sheffield Tigers	10 – 17	Hull Ionians

Dore Moor
Attendance: 210
Referee: Gavin Jones

25 February 2023
14:00

Tynedale	23 – 12	Fylde

Tynedale Park
Attendance: 245
Referee: Michael Harris

25 February 2023
14:15

(1 BP) Huddersfield	39 – 27	Rotherham Titans

Lockwood Park
Attendance: 242
Referee: Llyr ApGeraint-Roberts

25 February 2023
14:15

(1 BP) Sheffield	64 – 5	Blaydon

Abbeydale Park
Attendance: 202
Referee: David Charlton

25 February 2023
14:30

(1 BP) Sedgley Park	35 – 31	Wharfedale (2 BP)

Park Lane
Attendance: 200
Referee: Daniel Woods

25 February 2023
15:00

(1 BP) Chester	37 – 31	Preston Grasshoppers (2 BP)

Hare Lane
Attendance: 300
Referee: Neil Sweeney

=== Round 21 ===
4 March 2023
14:00

(1 BP) Rotherham Titans	36 – 26	Sheffield (1 BP)

Clifton Lane
Attendance: 365
Referee: George Ounsley

4 March 2023
14:30

(1 BP) Preston Grasshoppers	40 – 34	Tynedale (2 BP)

Lightfoot Green
Attendance: 310
Referee: Ben Davies

4 March 2023
15:00

(2 BP) Blaydon	26 – 28	Sheffield Tigers (1 BP)

Crow Trees
Attendance: 143
Referee: Mike Harris

4 March 2023
15:00

Fylde	19 – 19	Sedgley Park

Woodlands Memorial Ground
Attendance: 1,042
Referee: Ben Rayner

4 March 2023
15:00

Harrogate	21 – 17	Chester (1 BP)

Rudding Lane
Attendance: 100
Referee: Gavin Jones

4 March 2023
15:00

(1 BP) Hull Ionians	41 – 35	Otley (2 BP)

Brantingham Park
Attendance: 449
Referee: Llyr ApGeraint-Roberts

4 March 2023
15:00

(1 BP) Wharfedale	32 – 31	Huddersfield (2 BP)

The Avenue
Attendance: 435
Referee: David Charlton

=== Round 22 ===
11 March 2023
14:00

Otley	P – P	Blaydon

Cross Green

11 March 2023
14:00

Tynedale	14 – 11	Sedgley Park (1 BP)

Tynedale Park
Attendance: 280
Referee: Ben Davis

11 March 2023
14:15

Huddersfield	P – P	Fylde

Lockwood Park

11 March 2023
14:30

(1 BP) Preston Grasshoppers	34 – 17	Harrogate

Lightfoot Green
Attendance: 307
Referee: Dan Wood

11 March 2023
15:00

(1 BP) Chester	34 – 32	Hull Ionians (2 BP)

Hare Lane
Attendance: 200
Referee: James O'Brien

11 March 2023
15:00

Sheffield	P – P	Wharfedale

Abbeydale Park

11 March 2023
15:00

Sheffield Tigers	P – P	Rotherham Titans

Dore Moor

=== Rescheduled matches ===
18 March 2023
15:00

Harrogate	12 – 21	Huddersfield

Rudding Lane
Attendance: 100
Referee: Ben Davis

18 March 2023
15:00

Hull Ionians	19 – 30	Sedgley Park (1 BP)

Brantingham Park
Attendance: 251
Referee: Michael Harris

18 March 2023
15:00

(1 BP) Sheffield Tigers	28 – 17	Otley

Dore Moor
Attendance: 145
Referee: Peter Connor

=== Round 23 ===
25 March 2023
14:00

(1 BP) Rotherham Titans	28 – 21	Otley (1 BP)

Clifton Lane
Attendance: 254
Referee: Daniel Charlton

25 March 2023
14:30

(1 BP) Sedgley Park	38 – 14	Huddersfield

Park Lane
Attendance: 300
Referee: Jamie Parr

25 March 2023
15:00

(1 BP) Blaydon	36 – 17	Chester

Crow Trees
Attendance: 127
Referee: Gavin Jones

25 March 2023
15:00

(1 BP) Fylde	47 – 14	Sheffield

Woodlands Memorial Ground
Attendance: 638
Referee: James O'Brien

25 March 2023
15:00

Harrogate	12 – 24	Tynedale (1 BP)

Rudding Lane
Attendance: 175
Referee: Michael Harris

25 March 2023
15:00

(1 BP) Hull Ionians	33 – 29	Preston Grasshoppers (2 BP)

Brantingham Park
Attendance: 201
Referee: Daniel Woods

25 March 2023
15:00

(1 BP) Wharfedale	9 – 10	Sheffield Tigers

The Avenue
Attendance: 321
Referee: Ben Davis

=== Round 24 ===
1 April 2023
14:00

Otley	25 – 24	Wharfedale (1 BP)

Cross Green
Attendance: 560
Referee: Daniel Woods

1 April 2023
14:30

(1 BP) Preston Grasshoppers	33 – 21	Blaydon

Lightfoot Green
Attendance: 305
Referee: Ben Rayner

1 April 2023
15:00

Chester	28 – 38	Rotherham Titans (1 BP)

Hare Lane
Attendance: 202
Referee: George Ounsley

1 April 2023
15:00

(1 BP) Harrogate	40 – 72	Hull Ionians (1 BP)

Rudding Lane
Attendance: 175
Referee: Timothy Allatt

1 April 2023
15:00

Sheffield	17 – 38	Sedgley Park (1 BP)

Abbeydale Park
Attendance: 456
Referee: Gavin Jones

1 April 2023
15:00

Sheffield Tigers	30 – 33	Fylde (1 BP)

Dore Moor
Attendance: 252
Referee: Michael Harris

1 April 2023
15:00

(1 BP) Tynedale	47 – 17	Huddersfield

Tynedale Park
Attendance: 460
Referee: David Charlton

=== Rescheduled match ===
8 April 2023
15:00

Sheffield	12 – 38	Wharfedale (1 BP)

Abbeydale Park
Attendance: 367
Referee: Ben Rayner

=== Round 25 ===
15 April 2023
14:00

(1 BP) Rotherham Titans	38 – 7	Preston Grasshoppers

Clifton Lane
Attendance: 361
Referee: Benjamin Davis

15 April 2023
14:30

(1 BP) Sedgley Park	80 – 14	Sheffield Tigers

Park Lane
Attendance: 600
Referee: George Ounsley

15 April 2023
15:00

(1 BP) Blaydon	31 – 22	Harrogate (1 BP)

Crow Trees
Attendance: 125
Referee: David Charlton

15 April 2023
15:00

(1 BP) Fylde	28 – 10	Otley

Woodlands Memorial Ground
Attendance: 912
Referee: Llyr ApGeraint-Roberts

15 April 2023
15:00

Huddersfield	15 – 51	Sheffield (1 BP)

Lockwood Park
Attendance: 233
Referee: Tim Brown

15 April 2023
15:00

(1 BP) Hull Ionians	59 – 7	Tynedale

Brantingham Park
Attendance: 208
Referee: Daniel Woods

15 April 2023
15:00

(1 BP) Wharfedale	39 – 22	Chester

The Avenue
Attendance: 571
Referee: Michael Harris

=== Round 26 ===
22 April 2023
15:00

(1 BP) Chester	25 – 40	Fylde (1 BP)

Hare Lane
Attendance: 300
Referee: David Charlton

22 April 2023
15:00

Harrogate	17 – 45	Rotherham Titans (1 BP)

Rudding Lane
Attendance: 275
Referee: Dan Woods

22 April 2023
15:00

(1 BP) Hull Ionians	80 – 26	Blaydon (1 BP)

Brantingham Park
Attendance: 383
Referee: Gavin Jones

22 April 2023
15:00

Otley	10 – 28	Sedgley Park (1 BP)

Cross Green
Attendance: 280
Referee: Owen Taylor

22 April 2023
15:00

(1 BP) Preston Grasshoppers	27 – 12	Wharfedale

Lightfoot Green
Attendance: 515
Referee: Ben Rayner

22 April 2023
15:00

(1 BP) Sheffield	36 – 33	Tynedale (2 BP)

Abbeydale Park
Attendance: 467
Referee: Michael Harris

22 April 2023
15:00

(1 BP) Sheffield Tigers	24 – 31	Huddersfield (1 BP)

Dore Moor
Attendance: 291
Referee: Samuel Yates

=== Rescheduled matches ===
29 April 2023
15:00

Huddersfield	C – C	Fylde

Lockwood Park

29 April 2023
15:00

(1 BP) Otley	22 – 24	Tynedale (1 BP)

Cross Green
Attendance: 238
Referee: Owen Taylor

29 April 2023
15:00

Sheffield Tigers	10 – 40	Rotherham Titans (1 BP)

Dore Moor
Attendance: 301
Referee: Gavin Jones

=== Rescheduled match ===
6 May 2023
15:00

Otley	C – C	Blaydon

Cross Green

== Attendances ==
Club	Home games	Total	Average	Highest	Lowest	% Capacity
Blaydon	13	2,640	203	578	125	8%
Chester	13	3,889	299	400	200	15%
Fylde	13	8,170	628	1,042	452	8%
Harrogate	13	2,420	186	313	100	9%
Huddersfield	12 (Note: Huddersfield only played 12 homes games as their game versus Fylde on 29 April 2023 was cancelled.)	2,687	224	266	150	15%
Hull Ionians	13	3,671	282	449	201	19%
Otley	12 (Note: Otley only played 12 homes games as their game versus Blaydon on 6 May 2023 was cancelled.)	3,469	289	560	175	4%
Preston Grasshoppers	13	3,896	300	515	198	13%
Rotherham Titans	13	3,860	297	405	247	12%
Sedgley Park	13	3,799	292	600	150	10%
Sheffield	13	5,599	431	856	202	13%
Sheffield Tigers	13	3,977	306	500	145	31%
Tynedale	13	4,049	311	540	180	16%
Wharfedale	13	5,988	461	580	268	23%

== Individual statistics ==
=== Top points scorers ===
Rank	Player	Team	Tries
1	Richard Hayes	Rotherham Titans	267
2	Lewis Minikin	Hull Ionians	255
3	Eliot Fisher	Sheffield	244
4	Gregory Smith	Fylde	219
5	Stephen Collins	Sedgley Park	211
6	Mark Ireland	Sheffield Tigers	204
7	Will Milner	Huddersfield	199
8	Liam Reeve	Chester	159
9	Jake Rodgers	Tynedale	144

=== Top try scorers ===
Rank	Player	Team	Tries
1	Rhys Henderson	Sedgley Park	23
2	Eliot Fisher	Sheffield	20
3	Samuel Wilson	Hull Ionians	18
4	Christian Hooper	Sheffield	17
4	Lewis Minikin	Hull Ionians	17
4	Andrew Riley	Sedgley Park	17
5	Daniel Maher	Sedgley Park	16
6	Thomas Grimes	Fylde	14
6	Gethin Long	Chester	14

== See also ==
- 2022–23 National League 1
- 2022–23 National League 2 East
- 2022–23 National League 2 West
