= Brantingham Thorpe =

Building in Brantingham, East Riding of Yorkshire, England

Coordinates: 53°45′00″N 0°34′11″W

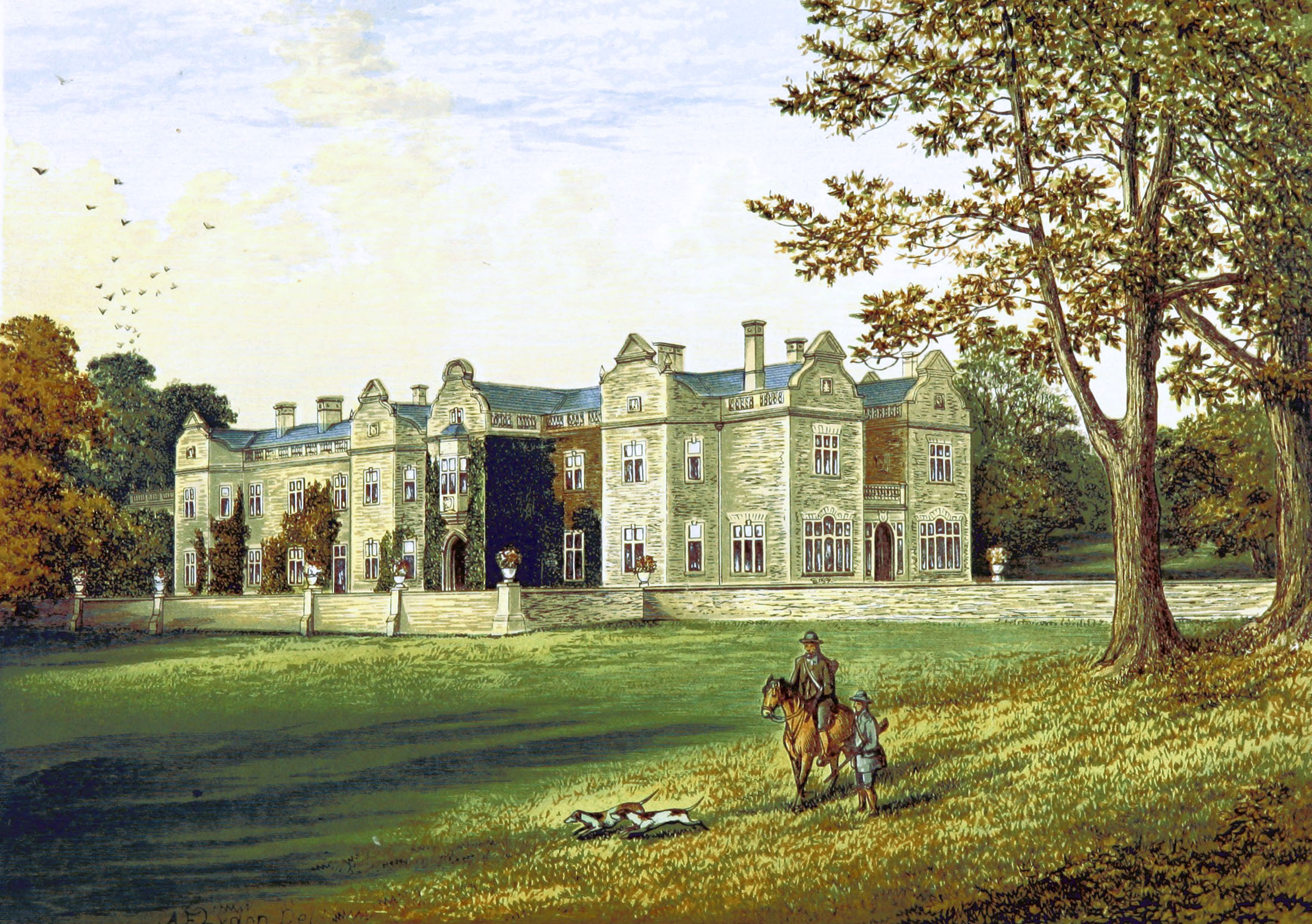
Brantingham Thorpe, from the book by Francis Orpen Morris

Brantingham Thorpe is a Grade II listed country house near Brantingham in the East Riding of Yorkshire, England. It was once owned by the Sykes family of Sledmere. According to Francis Orpen Morris (1880) "Brantingham Thorpe stands on a high terrace commanding a most extensive and beautiful view of the course of the river Humber for more than twenty miles." George Devey worked on the house.

It is currently the registered address of a Care Home company.
