= All Saints' Church, Brantingham =

Church in Brantingham, East Riding of Yorkshire, England

Coordinates: 53.7586°N 0.5699°W

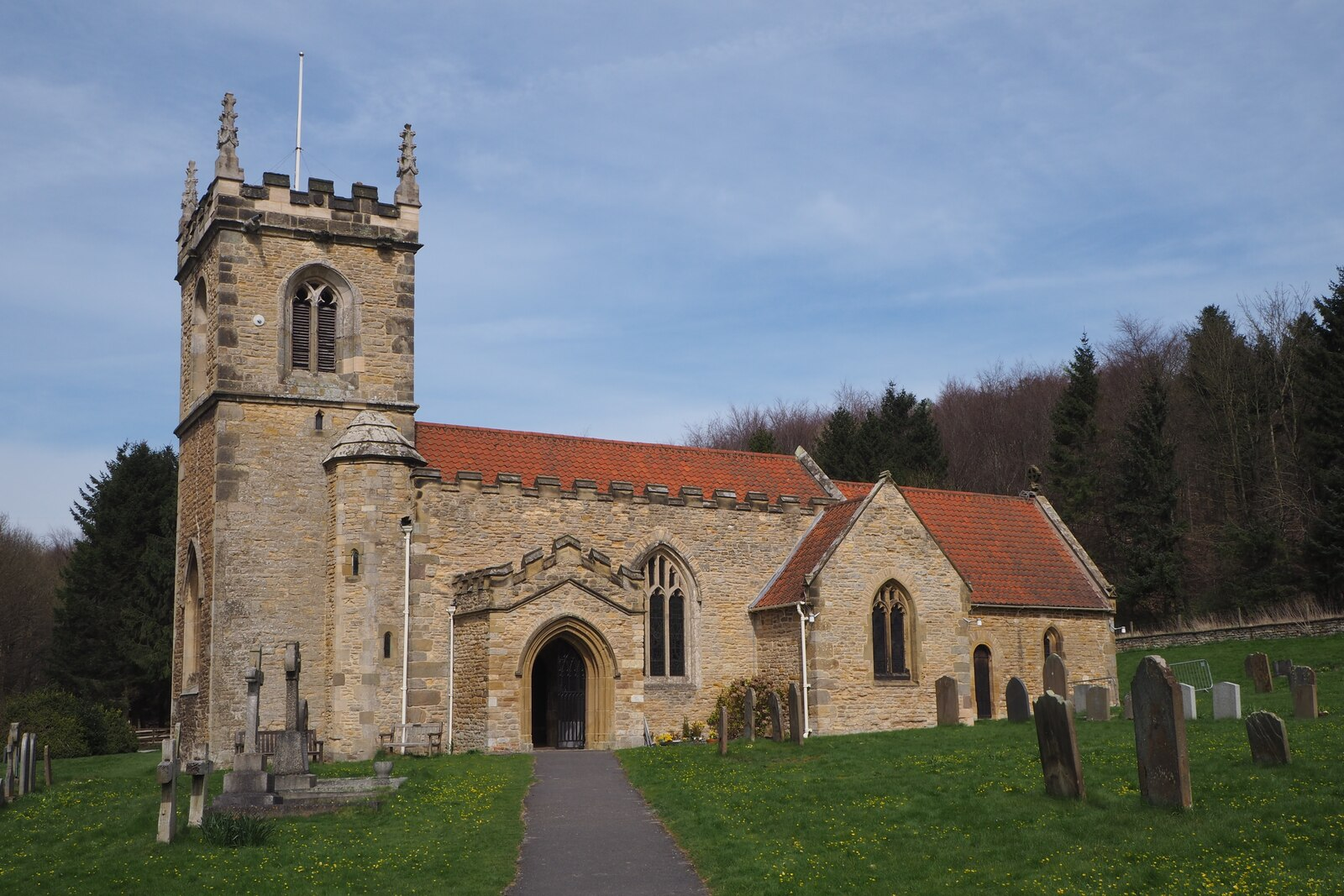
The church, in 2022

All Saints' Church is the parish church of Brantingham, a village in the East Riding of Yorkshire, in England.

The church was built in the 12th century, outside the village, at the foot of a wooded dale. In 1848, it was recorded as being "in the perpendicular style, with some traces of Norman architecture in the porch". In 1872, the church was largely rebuilt, using the original materials, to a design by George Edmund Street. The reconstruction cost £1,900, which was largely funded by Christopher Sykes. The building was grade II* listed in 1968.

The church is built of limestone with a pantile roof. The church consists of a nave, a south porch, north and south transepts, a chancel and a west tower. The tower has two stages, a low chamfered plinth, a two-light pointed west window with a hood mould, a polygonal stair turret in the southeast corner, string courses, and two-light bell openings, above which are gargoyles, and an embattled parapet with crocketed corner pinnacles. The nave and the porch also have embattled parapets. Inside, there is a tub font from the early 13th century, a selection of largely late-19th century stained glass, and a memorial to Antony Smethley, who died in 1578.

== See also ==
- Grade II* listed buildings in the East Riding of Yorkshire
- Listed buildings in Brantingham
