= Brantingham =

Village and civil parish in the East Riding of Yorkshire, England

Coordinates: 53.753653°N 0.575488°W

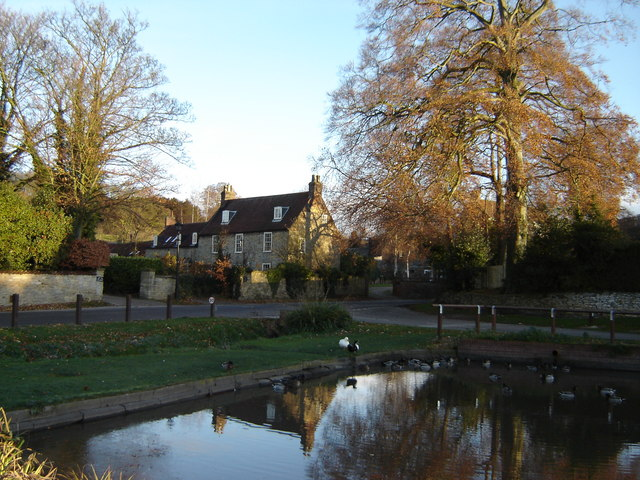
- Brantingham Pond

- Location within the East Riding of Yorkshire
- Population: 370 (2011 census)
- OS grid reference: SE940295
  - London: 155 mi (249 km) S
- Civil parish: Brantingham
- Unitary authority: East Riding of Yorkshire
- Ceremonial county: East Riding of Yorkshire
- Region: Yorkshire and the Humber
- Country: England
- Sovereign state: United Kingdom
- Post town: BROUGH
- Postcode district: HU15
- Dialling code: 01482
- Police: Humberside
- Fire: Humberside
- Ambulance: Yorkshire
- UK Parliament: Goole and Pocklington

Brantingham is a village and civil parish in the East Riding of Yorkshire, England, about 2 miles (3 km) north of Brough, 12 miles (19 km) west of Hull and north of the A63 road. The 2011 UK Census gave the parish had a population of 370, marking a decrease from the 2001 UK census figure of 410. The 2019 estimate was 319.

== Heritage ==
The name Brantingham possibly derives from an Old English or Old Norse personal name, like Brant or Brenti, the Old English ingas meaning 'the people of' and hām meaning 'village'. It may perhaps be derived simply from the Old English brantinghām meaning the 'village at the steep place' or the 'village of the dwellers of the steep place'.

The noble family of Brantingham (or de Brantingham), which included Ralph de Brantingham, King's Chamberlain to King Edward III, and Thomas de Brantingham, Lord Treasurer under the same king and later Bishop of Exeter, originally came from the village. In 1333, Lewis de Beaumont, a French-born Bishop of Durham described by a chronicler as "semi-literate, avaricious, and fitfully prodigal", died in the village. He had played some part in defending North-East England from Scottish incursions.

All Saints' Church, Brantingham was designated a Grade II* listed building in 1966 and is recorded in the National Heritage List for England maintained by Historic England.

The village has a duck pond, and one pub, the Triton Inn, formerly a coaching inn on the road west out of Hull, which was then an important staging post on the road between Welton and South Cave. At the time the inn was called The Tiger and had a wheelwrights and an agricultural engineer (Mr Watson) in the yard at the front. The name became the Wounded Tiger in the 1850s, but took its present name in the 1860s after the triton in the family crest of the Sykes family, who bought nearby Brantingham Thorpe. They owned the pub and another Triton Inn on their Sledmere estate just north of Driffield.

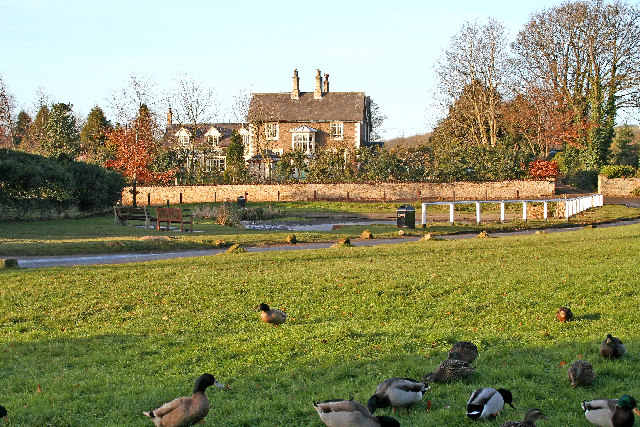
The duck pond, Brantingham

In the 1950s the village gave its name to HMS Brantingham, a Ham class minesweeper.

=== Roman remains ===
The site of Brantingham Roman villa is found at the other end of the long lane leading south-east from the village, known as Brantingham Outgang. The villa would have been associated with the Roman town at Petuaria Civitas Parisiorum (Brough-on-Humber) until the latter burnt down some time in the mid-4th century. In what is nowadays a flat, gated area located next to a large wood overlooking the main road between South Cave and Elloughton, traces of the villa (in the form of mosaic floors and hypocaust-heated rooms) were first discovered in late September 1941 (in what had been a working quarry since the Middle Ages and into the 1980s). As a result of the quarrying there is now no trace today, but an aerial survey made during the war confirmed the presence of Roman buildings associated with the villa on the other side of the modern road.

This Roman site attracted later notoriety in 1948, when a team of archaeologists from the Hull and East Riding Museum prepared the first of a group of mosaic pavements found at the villa site during the war, for removal. Overnight it was stolen and although the rest were safely recovered to the museum and are on display to this day, the missing first one has never been found. Neither has it ever been established exactly how it was stolen. This art theft was later taken by the historical novelist Clive Ashman as the basis for his novel MOSAIC – the Pavement that Walked (Voreda Books) which provides a fictionalised account of both the 1941 discoveries, police investigations into the 1948 theft, and the original fate of the Roman villa. Today, only a full-colour scale drawing of the reconstruction, done by the mosaic expert David Neal from black-and-white photographs shows what the stolen mosaic would have looked like.

== Transport and sights ==
Brantingham is on the main 155 bus route between Hull and South Cave, Goole and Howden.

The village has significant historic houses, including Brantingham Hall and Brantingham House, which overlook the duck pond in the centre of the village.

Brantingham lies on the western flank of the southern end of the Yorkshire Wolds, its surrounding area having different characters to the east (flat Vale of York and to the west Yorkshire Wolds. A local landmark is Spout Hill, named after an old water spout located at the bottom. The road from there leads steeply up to a height of about 330 feet (101 m), offering a westerly view towards the Vale of York. The road then dwindles into a bridle path leading to Riplingham, Elloughton and Welton. Two-thirds of the way up Spout Hill is another path that leads south, through the woods to Elloughton.

The Yorkshire Wolds Way National Trail, a long distance footpath, passes through the village.

== Sport ==
The village is home to the rugby union side Hull Ionians, which currently plays in National League 1 – the third division of the English rugby union system. The club's home ground since 1995 is Brantingham Park.

== See also ==
- Listed buildings in Brantingham
