= 2007–08 National Division Two =

Rugby union competition in England

- Countries: England
- Champions: Otley
- Runners-up: Manchester (also promoted)
- Relegated: Halifax, Henley Hawks, Nuneaton
- Attendance: 87,398 (average 483 per match) (Note: Note that 1 home attendance is missing (see below) - so the total attendance will not be 100% accurate. The average attendance has also been taken into account with the missing games not included.)
- Highest attendance: 1,453 Blackheath at home to Westcombe Park on 24 November 2007
- Lowest attendance: 100 Nuneaton at home to Manchester on 10 November 2007
- Top point scorer: (England) Gareth Wynne; Manchester 286 points
- Top try scorer: (South Africa) Christoff Lombaard; Cambridge 21 tries

The 2007–08 National Division Two was the eighth version (twenty first overall) of the third division of the English rugby union league system using the name National Division Two. New teams to the division included Waterloo and Otley who were relegated from the 2006–07 National Division One while promoted teams included Blaydon coming up from the 2006–07 National Division Three North while Southend (champions) and Westcombe Park (playoffs) came up from the 2006–07 National Division Three South.

At the end of the season Otley made an instant return to their former division by beating runners up Manchester to the title by just one point, with Manchester also gaining promotion by virtue of their second-place finish - both teams would be promoted to the 2008–09 National Division One. Relegated teams included Halifax, Henley Hawks and Nuneaton with Halifax picking up just two wins all season. Halifax and Nuneaton would drop to the 2008–09 National Division Three North while Henley Hawks would go into the 2008–09 National Division Three South.

One of the more bizarre events to take place over the season was Redruth's game away at Cambridge. Trailing 30 – 0 at half time the Reds returned to their dressing room to find that it had been raided by thieves while they had been playing. Incensed at the missing valuables, including wedding rings, the Redruth team refused to come out for the second half. This led to the game finishing 30 – 0 to Cambridge (who also got a bonus point for scoring four tries) and the RFU would dock Redruth 10 points for failing to complete the game.

== Participating teams and locations ==
Locations of the 2007-08 National Division Two teams

Team	Stadium	Capacity	City/Area
Blackheath	Rectory Field	3,500 (500 seats)	Blackheath, London
Blaydon	Crow Trees	2,000 (400 seats)	Swalwell, Tyne and Wear
Cambridge	Grantchester Road	2,200 (200 seats)	Cambridge, Cambridgeshire
Halifax	Ovenden Park		Halifax, West Yorkshire
Henley Hawks	Dry Leas	4,000	Henley-on-Thames, Oxfordshire
Manchester	Grove Park	4,000	Cheadle Hulme, Greater Manchester
Nuneaton	Liberty Way	3,800 (500 seats)	Nuneaton, Warwickshire
Otley	Cross Green	7,000 (852 seats)	Otley, West Yorkshire
Redruth	The Recreation Ground	3,500 (580 seats)	Redruth, Cornwall
Southend	Warners Park	1,500 (150 seats)	Southend, Essex
Stourbridge	Stourton Park	3,500 (499 seats)	Stourbridge, West Midlands
Waterloo	St Anthony's Road	9,950 (950 seats)	Blundellsands, Merseyside
Westcombe Park	Goddington Dene	3,200 (200 seats)	Orpington, London
Wharfedale	The Avenue	2,000	Threshfield, Craven, North Yorkshire

== Final league table ==
2007–08 National Division Two table
Pos	Team	Pld	W	D	L	PF	PA	PD	B	Pts
1	Otley (C, P)	26	23	0	3	780	379	+401	13	105
2	Manchester (P)	26	21	0	5	802	460	+342	20	104
3	Stourbridge	26	21	0	5	677	434	+243	15	99
4	Blackheath	26	15	0	11	596	602	−6	15	75
5	Cambridge	26	14	0	12	619	569	+50	13	69
6	Westcombe Park	26	13	1	12	649	568	+81	15	69
7	Wharfedale	26	12	1	13	592	559	+33	17	67
8	Southend	26	12	0	14	666	620	+46	18	66
9	Redruth	26	14	0	12	545	514	+31	12	58 (Note: Redruth deducted ten points for failing to complete their match against Cambridge on 29 September 2007)
10	Waterloo	26	11	1	14	488	517	−29	8	54
11	Blaydon	26	10	0	16	530	666	−136	13	53
12	Nuneaton (R)	26	6	0	20	456	747	−291	8	32
13	Henley Hawks (R)	26	6	1	19	333	617	−284	5	31
14	Halifax (R)	26	2	0	24	382	863	−481	6	14

Updated to match(es) played on 2008-03-30. Source: National Clubs Association and BBC Sport
(C) Champion; (P) Promoted; (R) Relegated

== Results ==
=== Round 1 ===
1 September 2007

(BP) Halifax	27 - 30	Wharfedale (BP)
	Report

Ovenden Park
Attendance: 585
Referee: Andrew Taylorson

1 September 2007

Henley Hawks	3 - 15	Cambridge
	Report

Dry Leas
Attendance: 410
Referee: Terry Hall

1 September 2007

(2BP) Manchester	27 - 28	Blackheath (BP)
	Report

Grove Park
Attendance: 307
Referee: Brendan Fitzmaurice

1 September 2007

Otley	25 - 15	Waterloo
	Report

Cross Green
Attendance: 672
Referee: Andrew Vertigan

1 September 2007

(BP) Southend	13 - 16	Stourbridge
	Report

Warners Bridge Park
Attendance: 600
Referee: Keith Lewis

1 September 2007

(BP) Westcombe Park	39 - 28	Blaydon (BP)
	Report

Goddington Dene
Attendance: 300
Referee: Darren Gamage

2 September 2007

(BP) Nuneaton	14 - 21	Redruth
	Report

Liberty Way
Attendance: 200
Referee: Richard Phillips

=== Round 2 ===
15 September 2007

(BP) Blaydon	43 - 28	Halifax
	Report

Crow Trees
Attendance: 498
Referee: Terry Hall

15 September 2007

Cambridge	32 - 13	Nuneaton
	Report

Grantchester Road
Attendance: 525
Referee: Darren Gamage

15 September 2007

Waterloo	23 - 19	Manchester (BP)
	Report

St Anthony's Road
Attendance: 444
Referee: Richard Parker-Sedgmore

15 September 2007

(BP) Westcombe Park	22 - 21	Southend (BP)
	Report

Goddington Dene
Attendance: 200
Referee: Ed Turnill

15 September 2007

Blackheath	P - P	Henley Hawks

- Postponed. Game rescheduled to 17 November 2007.

15 September 2007

Redruth	P - P	Stourbridge

- Postponed. Game rescheduled to 17 November 2007.

15 September 2007

Wharfedale	P - P	Otley

- Postponed. Game rescheduled to 17 November 2007.

=== Round 3 ===
22 September 2007

Halifax	10 - 27	Westcombe Park (BP)
	Report

Ovenden Park
Attendance: 315
Referee: Ian Robinson

22 September 2007

Henley Hawks	16 - 9	Waterloo (BP)
	Report

Dry Leas
Attendance: 250
Referee: Richard Phillips

22 September 2007

(BP) Manchester	35 - 29	Wharfedale (2BP)
	Report

Grove Park
Attendance: 289
Referee: Terry Hall

22 September 2007

Nuneaton	3 - 32	Blackheath (BP)
	Report

Liberty Way
Attendance: 400
Referee: Andrew Taylorson

22 September 2007

(BP) Otley	48 - 8	Blaydon
	Report

Cross Green
Attendance: 471
Referee: Keith Lewis

22 September 2007

(BP) Southend	48 - 27	Redruth (BP)
	Report

Warners Bridge Park
Attendance: 270
Referee: Darren Gamage

22 September 2007

(BP) Stourbridge	32 - 19	Cambridge
	Report

Stourton Park
Attendance: 500
Referee: Richard Parker-Sedgmore

=== Round 4 ===
29 September 2007

Blackheath	21 - 11	Stourbridge
	Report

Rectory Field
Attendance: 460
Referee: Richard Draper

29 September 2007

(BP) Blaydon	15 - 17	Manchester
	Report

Crow Trees
Attendance: 256
Referee: Brendan Fitzmaurice

29 September 2007

(BP) Cambridge	30 - 0	Redruth
	Report

Grantchester Road
Attendance: 625
Referee: Terry Hall

- Game abandoned after 40 minutes as Redruth players refused to play second half after thieves raided the players dressing room. Redruth deducted 10 points for failing to finish game.

29 September 2007

(BP) Halifax	37 - 34	Southend (2BP)
	Report

Ovenden Park
Attendance: 270
Referee: Andrew Taylorson

29 September 2007

(BP) Waterloo	29 - 25	Nuneaton (BP)
	Report

St Anthony's Road
Attendance: 335
Referee: Chris Sharp

29 September 2007

Westcombe Park	10 - 22	Otley
	Report

Goddington Dene
Attendance: 220
Referee: Nigel Higginson

29 September 2007

Wharfedale	12 - 12	Henley Hawks
	Report

The Avenue
Attendance: 456
Referee: Andrew Vertigan

=== Round 5 ===
6 October 2007

Henley Hawks	10 - 6	Blaydon (BP)
	Report

Dry Leas
Attendance: 340
Referee: JP Doyle

6 October 2007

(BP) Manchester	32 - 27	Westcombe Park (BP)
	Report

Grove Park
Attendance: 297
Referee: Darren Gamage

6 October 2007

Nuneaton	18 - 25	Wharfedale (BP)
	Report

Liberty Way
Attendance: 200
Referee: Keith Lewis

6 October 2007

(BP) Otley	40 - 10	Halifax
	Report

Cross Green
Attendance: 694
Referee: Chris Sharp

6 October 2007

Redruth	14 - 34	Blackheath (BP)
	Report

The Recreation Ground
Attendance: 757
Referee: Richard Parker-Sedgmore

6 October 2007

Southend	26 - 22	Cambridge (BP)
	Report

Warners Bridge Park
Attendance: 400
Referee: Ed Turnill

6 October 2007

(BP) Stourbridge	38 - 19	Waterloo
	Report

Stourton Park
Attendance: 350
Referee: Andrew Taylorson

=== Round 6 ===
13 October 2007

(BP) Blackheath	32 - 24	Cambridge (BP)
	Report

Rectory Field
Attendance: 860
Referee: Richard Phillips

13 October 2007

(BP) Blaydon	29 - 25	Nuneaton (BP)
	Report

Crow Trees
Attendance: 324
Referee: Andrew Taylorson

13 October 2007

Halifax	24 - 34	Manchester (BP)
	Report

Ovenden Park
Attendance: 362
Referee: Andrew Vertigan

13 October 2007

(BP) Otley	37 - 11	Southend
	Report

Cross Green
Attendance: 717
Referee: Keith Lewis

13 October 2007

Waterloo	25 - 19	Redruth (BP)
	Report

St Anthony's Road
Attendance: 300
Referee: Adrian Hartwell

13 October 2007

(BP) Westcombe Park	27 - 24	Henley Hawks (BP)
	Report

Goddington Dene
Attendance: 256
Referee: Richard Parker-Sedgmore

13 October 2007

(BP) Wharfedale	12 - 13	Stourbridge
	Report

The Avenue
Attendance: 420
Referee: Ian Robinson

=== Round 7 ===
20 October 2007

Cambridge	15 - 3	Waterloo
	Report

Grantchester Road
Attendance: 550
Referee: Andrew Vertigan

20 October 2007

(BP) Henley Hawks	30 - 9	Halifax
	Report

Dry Leas
Attendance: 485
Referee: Darren Gamage

20 October 2007

(BP) Manchester	32 - 21	Otley
	Report

Grove Park
Attendance: 325
Referee: Andrew Taylorson

20 October 2007

Redruth	31 - 22	Wharfedale
	Report

The Recreation Ground
Attendance: 644
Referee: Nigel Higginson

20 October 2007

Southend	21 - 29	Blackheath
	Report

Warners Bridge Park
Attendance: 450
Referee: Brendan Fitzmaurice

20 October 2007

(BP) Stourbridge	52 - 15	Blaydon
	Report

Stourton Park
Attendance: 400
Referee: Chris Sharp

20 October 2007

(BP) Westcombe Park	67 - 19	Nuneaton
	Report

Goddington Dene
Attendance: 210
Referee: Terry Hall

=== Round 8 ===
27 October 2007

Blaydon	25 - 0	Redruth
	Report

Crow Trees
Attendance: 353
Referee: Andrew Taylorson

27 October 2007

(BP) Halifax	23 - 24	Nuneaton
	Report

Ovenden Park
Attendance: 385
Referee: Ian Robinson

27 October 2007

(BP) Manchester	41 - 22	Southend
	Report

Grove Park
Attendance: 319
Referee: Richard Parker-Sedgmore

27 October 2007

Otley	23 - 10	Henley Hawks
	Report

Cross Green
Attendance: 780
Referee: Brendan Fitzmaurice

27 October 2007

(BP) Waterloo	27 - 16	Blackheath
	Report

St Anthony's Road
Attendance: 431
Referee: Nigel Higginson

27 October 2007

(BP) Westcombe Park	14 - 17	Stourbridge
	Report

Goddington Dene
Attendance: 240
Referee: Ed Turnill

27 October 2007

(BP) Wharfedale	27 - 24	Cambridge (BP)
	Report

The Avenue
Attendance: 456
Referee: Richard Kelly

=== Round 9 ===
3 November 2015

(BP) Blackheath	37 - 28	Wharfedale
	Report

Rectory Field
Attendance: 780
Referee: David Sainsbury

3 November 2015

(BP) Cambridge	57 - 12	Blaydon
	Report

Grantchester Road
Attendance: 620
Referee: Keith Lewis

3 November 2015

Henley Hawks	25 - 16	Manchester
	Report

Dry Leas
Attendance: 435
Referee: Terry Hall

3 November 2015

Nuneaton	21 - 38	Otley (BP)
	Report

Liberty Way
Attendance: 150
Referee: Darren Gamage

3 November 2015

Redruth	19 - 16	Westcombe Park (BP)
	Report

The Recreation Ground
Attendance: 612
Referee: Richard Phillips

3 November 2015

(BP) Southend	40 - 6	Waterloo
	Report

Warners Bridge Park
Attendance: 250
Referee: Mark Varnon

3 November 2015

(BP) Stourbridge	37 - 13	Halifax
	Report

Stourton Park
Attendance: 450
Referee: Tim Fisher

=== Round 10 ===
10 November 2007

(BP) Blaydon	34 - 31	Blackheath (2BP)
	Report

Crow Trees
Attendance: 462
Referee: Adrian Hartwell

10 November 2007

Halifax	17 - 41	Redruth (BP)
	Report

Ovenden Park
Attendance: 420
Referee: Richard Parker-Sedgmore

10 November 2007

(BP) Henley Hawks	8 - 9	Southend
	Report

Dry Leas
Attendance: 455
Referee: Richard Kelly

10 November 2007

Nuneaton	20 - 43	Manchester (BP)
	Report

Liberty Way
Attendance: 100
Referee: Richard Phillips

10 November 2007

(BP) Otley	20 - 21	Stourbridge
	Report

Cross Green
Attendance: 912
Referee: Andrew Taylorson

10 November 2007

Westcombe Park	28 - 17	Cambridge
	Report

Goddington Dene
Attendance: 315
Referee: JP Doyle

10 November 2007

(BP) Wharfedale	18 - 24	Waterloo
	Report

The Avenue
Attendance: 416
Referee: Andrew Vertigan

=== Round 2 (rescheduled games) ===
17 November 2007

Blackheath	19 - 3	Henley Hawks
	Report

Rectory Field
Attendance: 649
Referee: Keith Lewis

- Game rescheduled from 15 September 2007.

17 November 2007

(BP) Redruth	27 - 9	Stourbridge
	Report

The Recreation Ground
Attendance: 802
Referee: Darren Gamage

- Game rescheduled from 15 September 2007.

17 November 2007

Wharfedale	0 - 18	Otley
	Report

The Avenue
Attendance: 1,010
Referee: Nigel Higginson

- Game rescheduled from 15 September 2007.

=== Round 11 ===
24 November 2007

Blackheath	19 - 34	Westcombe Park (BP)
	Report

Rectory Field
Attendance: 1,453
Referee: Darren Gamage

24 November 2007

Cambridge	20 - 8	Halifax
	Report

Grantchester Road
Attendance: 480
Referee: Michael Tutty

24 November 2007

(BP) Nuneaton	3 - 10	Henley Hawks
	Report

Liberty Way
Attendance: 150
Referee: Chris Sharp

24 November 2007

(BP) Redruth	7 - 13	Otley
	Report

The Recreation Ground
Attendance: 900
Referee: David Sainsbury

24 November 2007

(BP) Southend	32 - 21	Wharfedale
	Report

Warners Bridge Park
Attendance: 400
Referee: Richard Parker-Sedgmore

24 November 2007

(BP) Stourbridge	8 - 11	Manchester
	Report

Stourton Park
Attendance: 550
Referee: Andrew Vertigan

24 November 2007

(BP) Waterloo	26 - 12	Blaydon
	Report

St Anthony's Road
Attendance: 287
Referee: Brendan Fitzmaurice

=== Round 12 ===
1 December 2007

Blaydon	15 - 29	Wharfedale (BP)
	Report

Crow Trees
Attendance: 373
Referee: Trevor Fisher

1 December 2007

Halifax	15 - 32	Blackheath (BP)
	Report

Ovenden Park
Attendance: 420
Referee: Andrew Taylorson

1 December 2007

Henley Hawks	14 - 24	Stourbridge
	Report

Dry Leas
Attendance: 315
Referee: Steve Harland

1 December 2007

(BP) Manchester	22 - 14	Redruth
	Report

Grove Park
Attendance: 270
Referee: Alan Falzone

1 December 2007

(BP) Otley	34 - 25	Cambridge
	Report

Cross Green
Attendance: 483
Referee: Terry Hall

1 December 2007

Westcombe Park	22 - 22	Waterloo
	Report

Goddington Dene
Attendance: 320
Referee: Matt Kemp

2 December 2007

Nuneaton	16 - 12	Southend (BP)
	Report

Liberty Way
Attendance: 180
Referee: JP Doyle

=== Round 13 ===
15 December 2007

(BP) Blackheath	12 - 17	Otley
	Report

Rectory Field
Attendance: 650
Referee: Richard Phillips

15 December 2007

(BP) Cambridge	29 - 18	Manchester
	Report

Grantchester Road
Attendance: 402
Referee: Mark Wilson

15 December 2007

(BP) Redruth	44 - 3	Henley Hawks
	Report

The Recreation Ground
Attendance: 747
Referee: Darren Gamage

15 December 2007

Southend	23 - 8	Blaydon
	Report

Warners Bridge Park
Attendance: 375
Referee: Terry Hall

15 December 2007

(BP) Stourbridge	31 - 12	Nuneaton
	Report

Stourton Park
Attendance: 500
Referee: Richard Parker-Sedgmore

15 December 2007

(BP) Waterloo	24 - 0	Halifax
	Report

St Anthony's Road
Attendance: 287
Referee: Ed Turnill

15 December 2007

Wharfedale	P - P	Westcombe Park

- Postponed. Game rescheduled to 22 March 2008.

=== Round 14 ===
22 December 2007

Halifax	11 - 39	Blaydon (BP)
	Report

Ovenden Park
Attendance: 282
Referee: Michael Tutty

22 December 2007

Henley Hawks	18 - 27	Blackheath (BP)
	Report

Dry Leas
Attendance: 527
Referee: Andrew Taylorson

22 December 2007

Manchester	5 - 22	Waterloo
	Report

Grove Park
Attendance: 479
Referee: Tim Fisher

22 December 2007

Nuneaton	26 - 7	Cambridge
	Report

Liberty Way
Attendance: 270
Referee: Terry Hall

22 December 2007

(BP) Otley	42 - 9	Wharfedale
	Report

Cross Green
Attendance: 1,363
Referee: Brendan Fitzmaurice

22 December 2007

(BP) Southend	30 - 21	Westcombe Park
	Report

Warners Bridge Park
Attendance: 580
Referee: Richard Phillips

22 December 2007

(BP) Stourbridge	34 - 0	Redruth
	Report

Stourton Park
Attendance: 500
Referee: Richard Kelly

=== Round 15 ===
5 January 2008

(BP) Blackheath	54 - 18	Nuneaton
	Report

Rectory Field
Attendance: 683
Referee: Richard Phillips

5 January 2008

(BP) Blaydon	19 - 23	Otley
	Report

Crow Trees
Attendance: 473
Referee: Trevor Fisher

5 January 2008

Cambridge	8 - 32	Stourbridge (BP)
	Report

Grantchester Road
Attendance: 580
Referee: Darren Gamage

5 January 2008

(BP) Redruth	40 - 17	Southend
	Report

The Recreation Ground
Attendance: 630
Referee: Paul Kimber

5 January 2008

(BP) Waterloo	34 - 0	Henley Hawks
	Report

St Anthony's Road
Attendance: 350
Referee: Richard Kelly

5 January 2008

(BP) Westcombe Park	59 - 0	Halifax
	Report

Goddington Dene
Attendance: 730
Referee: David Sainsbury

5 January 2008

Wharfedale	7 - 27	Manchester (BP)
	Report

The Avenue
Attendance: 420
Referee: Andrew Taylorson

=== Round 16 ===
19 January 2008

(BP) Otley	46 - 8	Westcombe Park
	Report

Cross Green
Attendance: 550
Referee: Brendan Fitzmaurice

19 January 2008

Redruth	25 - 8	Cambridge
	Report

The Recreation Ground
Attendance: 859
Referee: Nick Williams

19 January 2008

(BP) Southend	36 - 26	Halifax (BP)
	Report

Warners Bridge Park
Attendance: 480
Referee: Philip Davis

19 January 2008

(BP) Stourbridge	29 - 7	Blackheath
	Report

Stourton Park
Attendance: 800
Referee: Adrian Hartwell

19 January 2008

Henley Hawks	P - P	Wharfedale

- Postponed. Game rescheduled to 8 March 2008.

19 January 2008

Manchester	P - P	Blaydon

- Postponed. Game rescheduled to 8 March 2008.

19 January 2008

Nuneaton	P - P	Waterloo

- Postponed. Game rescheduled to 2 February 2008.

=== Round 17 ===
26 January 2008

Blackheath	10 - 18	Redruth
	Report

Rectory Field
Attendance: 920
Referee: Michael Tutty

26 January 2008

(BP) Blaydon	34 - 12	Henley Hawks
	Report

Crow Trees
Attendance: 246
Referee: Brendan Fitzmaurice

26 January 2008

(BP) Cambridge	35 - 32	Southend (2BP)
	Report

Grantchester Road
Attendance: 520
Referee: JP Doyle

26 January 2008

Halifax	13 - 24	Otley
	Report

Ovenden Park
Attendance: 545
Referee: Richard Draper

26 January 2008

(BP) Waterloo	15 - 18	Stourbridge
	Report

St Anthony's Road
Attendance: 427
Referee: Nigel Higginson

26 January 2008

(2BP) Westcombe Park	31 - 32	Manchester (BP)
	Report

Goddington Dene
Attendance: 355
Referee: Richard Phillips

26 January 2008

Wharfedale	22 - 16	Nuneaton (BP)
	Report

The Avenue
Attendance: 330
Referee: Richard Kelly

=== Round 16 (rescheduled game) ===
2 February 2008

Nuneaton	19 - 17	Waterloo (BP)
	Report

Liberty Way
Attendance: 150
Referee: David Sainsbury

- Game rescheduled from 19 January 2008.

=== Round 18 ===
9 February 2008

(BP) Cambridge	40 - 10	Blackheath
	Report

Grantchester Road
Attendance: 625
Referee: Richard Phillips

9 February 2008

(BP) Henley Hawks	5 - 9	Westcombe Park
	Report

Dry Leas
Attendance: 405
Referee: Richard Draper

9 February 2008

Nuneaton	5 - 20	Blaydon
	Report

Liberty Way
Attendance: 160
Referee: Andrew Taylorson

9 February 2008

Redruth	22 - 10	Waterloo
	Report

The Recreation Ground
Attendance: 928
Referee: Trevor Fisher

9 February 2008

(BP) Southend	20 - 24	Otley
	Report

Warners Bridge Park
Attendance: 350
Referee: Darren Gamage

9 February 2008

Stourbridge	29 - 26	Wharfedale (BP)
	Report

Stourton Park
Attendance: 700
Referee: Brendan Fitzmaurice

9 February 2008

Manchester	P - P	Halifax

- Postponed. Game rescheduled to 22 March 2008.

=== Round 19 ===
16 February 2008

(BP) Blackheath	41 - 33	Southend (BP)
	Report

Rectory Field
Attendance: 680
Referee: Andy Fielding

16 February 2008

(BP) Blaydon	29 - 20	Stourbridge
	Report

Crow Trees
Attendance: 348
Referee: P.W Davies

16 February 2008

(BP) Halifax	15 - 21	Henley Hawks
	Report

Ovenden Park
Attendance: 225
Referee: Ed Turnill

16 February 2008

Nuneaton	28 - 39	Westcombe Park (BP)
	Report

Liberty Way
Attendance: 200
Referee: Richard Phillips

16 February 2008

(BP) Otley	41 - 17	Manchester
	Report

Cross Green
Attendance: 783
Referee: Terry Hall

16 February 2008

Waterloo	20 - 30	Cambridge (BP)
	Report

St Anthony's Road
Attendance: 382
Referee: Chris Sharp

16 February 2008

Wharfedale	17 - 10	Redruth (BP)
	Report

The Avenue
Attendance: 435
Referee: Nigel Higginson

=== Round 20 ===
23 February 2008

Blackheath	31 - 22	Waterloo
	Report

Rectory Field
Attendance: 640
Referee: Andrew Vertigan

23 February 2008

(BP) Cambridge	33 - 22	Wharfedale (BP)
	Report

Grantchester Road
Attendance: 535
Referee: Terry Hall

23 February 2008

Henley Hawks	10 - 29	Otley (BP)
	Report

Dry Leas
Attendance: 340
Referee: Nigel Higginson

23 February 2008

(BP) Nuneaton	41 - 22	Halifax
	Report

Liberty Way
Attendance: 250
Referee: Chris Sharp

23 February 2008

Redruth	25 - 14	Blaydon
	Report

The Recreation Ground
Attendance: 968
Referee: Paul Knowles

23 February 2008

Southend	8 - 39	Manchester (BP)
	Report

Warners Bridge Park
Attendance: 720
Referee: Richard Kelly

23 February 2008

(BP) Stourbridge	32 - 12	Westcombe Park
	Report

Stourton Park
Attendance: 650
Referee: Richard Parker-Sedgmore

=== Round 21 ===
1 March 2008

(BP) Blaydon	35 - 8	Cambridge
	Report

Crow Trees
Attendance: 260
Referee: Adrian Hartwell

1 March 2008

Halifax	10 - 34	Stourbridge (BP)
	Report

Ovenden Park
Attendance: 247
Referee: Richard Kelly

1 March 2008

(BP) Manchester	41 - 13	Henley Hawks
	Report

Grove Park
Attendance: 347
Referee: Keith Lewis

1 March 2008

Otley	23 - 5	Nuneaton
	Report

Cross Green
Attendance: 461
Referee: Michael Tutty

1 March 2008

Waterloo	15 - 24	Southend
	Report

St Anthony's Road
Referee: Darren Gamage

1 March 2008

(BP) Westcombe Park	40 - 14	Redruth
	Report

Goddington Dene
Attendance: 250
Referee: Terry Hall

1 March 2008

(BP) Wharfedale	39 - 7	Blackheath
	Report

The Avenue
Attendance: 425
Referee: Andrew Taylorson

=== Round 16 (rescheduled games) ===
8 March 2008

Henley Hawks	18 - 29	Wharfedale (BP)
	Report

Dry Leas
Attendance: 190
Referee: Mark Wilson

- Game rescheduled from 19 January 2008.

8 March 2008

(BP) Manchester	64 - 10	Blaydon
	Report

Grove Park
Attendance: 243
Referee: Chris Sharp

- Game rescheduled from 19 January 2008.

=== Round 22 ===
15 March 2008

(BP) Blackheath	32 - 26	Blaydon (2BP)
	Report

Rectory Field
Attendance: 475
Referee: Richard Phillips

15 March 2008

Cambridge	27 - 13	Westcombe Park
	Report

Grantchester Road
Attendance: 470
Referee: Andrew Taylorson

15 March 2008

(BP) Manchester	29 - 8	Nuneaton
	Report

Grove Park
Attendance: 289
Referee: Brendan Fitzmaurice

15 March 2008

(BP) Redruth	38 - 3	Halifax
	Report

The Recreation Ground
Attendance: 753
Referee: Philip Davis

15 March 2008

(BP) Southend	59 - 12	Henley Hawks
	Report

Warners Bridge Park
Attendance: 430
Referee: Terry Hall

15 March 2008

(BP) Stourbridge	41 - 23	Otley
	Report

Stourton Park
Attendance: 800
Referee: Andrew Vertigan

15 March 2008

Waterloo	30 - 8	Wharfedale
	Report

St Anthony's Road
Attendance: 403
Referee: Paul Knowles

=== Rounds 13 & 18 (rescheduled games) ===
22 March 2008

(BP) Manchester	67 - 3	Halifax
	Report

Grove Park
Attendance: 295
Referee: Trevor Fisher

- Game rescheduled from 9 February 2008.

22 March 2008

(BP) Wharfedale	38 - 10	Westcombe Park
	Report

The Avenue
Attendance: 456
Referee: Mark Wilson

- Game rescheduled from 15 December 2007.

=== Round 23 ===
29 March 2008

Blaydon	21 - 7	Waterloo
	Report

Crow Trees
Attendance: 301
Referee: Andrew McMenemy

29 March 2008

Halifax	11 - 20	Cambridge
	Report

Ovenden Park
Attendance: 384
Referee: Philip Davis

29 March 2008

(BP) Henley Hawks	18 - 23	Nuneaton
	Report

Dry Leas
Attendance: 254
Referee: Brendan Fitzmaurice

29 March 2008

(BP) Manchester	27 - 7	Stourbridge
	Report

Grove Park
Attendance: 563
Referee: Adrian Hartwell

29 March 2008

Otley	20 - 18	Redruth (BP)
	Report

Cross Green
Attendance: 716
Referee: Andrew Taylorson

29 March 2008

(BP) Westcombe Park	7 - 13	Blackheath
	Report

Goddington Dene
Attendance: 1,021
Referee: Richard Parker-Sedgmore

29 March 2008

(BP) Wharfedale	24 - 7	Southend
	Report

The Avenue
Attendance: 415
Referee: Nigel Higginson

=== Round 24 ===
12 April 2008

Blackheath	20 - 17	Halifax (BP)
	Report

Rectory Field
Referee: 475

12 April 2008

(BP) Cambridge	22 - 47	Otley (BP)
	Report

Grantchester Road
Attendance: 560
Referee: Michael Tutty

12 April 2008

Redruth	10 - 42	Manchester (BP)
	Report

The Recreation Ground
Attendance: 824
Referee: Keith Lewis

12 April 2008

(BP) Stourbridge	41 - 19	Henley Hawks
	Report

Stourton Park
Attendance: 600
Referee: Terry Hall

12 April 2008

Waterloo	22 - 17	Westcombe Park (BP)
	Report

St Anthony's Road
Attendance: 286
Referee: Ed Turnill

12 April 2008

(BP) Wharfedale	33 - 10	Blaydon
	Report

The Avenue
Attendance: 520
Referee: Mark Wilson

13 April 2008

(BP) Southend	41 - 15	Nuneaton
	Report

Warners Bridge Park
Attendance: 680
Referee: Richard Kelly

=== Round 25 ===
19 April 2008

Blaydon	11 - 24	Southend (BP)
	Report

Crow Trees
Attendance: 210
Referee: Fraser Gill

19 April 2008

Halifax	20 - 7	Waterloo
	Report

Ovenden Park
Attendance: 220
Referee: Luke Pearce

19 April 2008

Henley Hawks	5 - 22	Redruth (BP)
	Report

Dry Leas
Attendance: 335
Referee: Richard Phillips

19 April 2008

(BP) Manchester	36 - 14	Cambridge
	Report

Grove Park
Attendance: 432
Referee: Richard Parker-Sedgmore

19 April 2008

(BP) Nuneaton	23 - 24	Stourbridge (BP)
	Report

Liberty Way
Attendance: 280
Referee: Ed Turnill

19 April 2008

(BP) Otley	47 - 0	Blackheath
	Report

Cross Green
Attendance: 1,037
Referee: Richard Draper

19 April 2008

(BP) Westcombe Park	24 - 22	Wharfedale (BP)
	Report

Goddington Dene
Attendance: 189
Referee: Michael Tutty

=== Round 26 ===
26 April 2008

Blackheath	3 - 29	Manchester (BP)
	Report

Rectory Field
Attendance: 857
Referee: Darren Gamage

26 April 2008

Blaydon	10 - 27	Westcombe Park
	Report

Crow Trees
Attendance: 614
Referee: Richard Kelly

26 April 2008

(BP) Cambridge	38 - 14	Henley Hawks
	Report

Grantchester Road
Attendance: 1,370
Referee: David Sainsbury

26 April 2008

(BP) Redruth	39 - 16	Nuneaton
	Report

The Recreation Ground
Attendance: 825
Referee: Richard Parker-Sedgmore

26 April 2008

(BP) Stourbridge	27 - 23	Southend (BP)
	Report

Stourton Park
Attendance: 650
Referee: Rowan Kitt

26 April 2008

Waterloo	15 - 37	Otley (BP)
	Report

St Anthony's Road
Attendance: 620
Referee: Andrew Vertigan

26 April 2008

(BP) Wharfedale	41 - 10	Halifax
	Report

The Avenue
Attendance: 450
Referee: Luke Pearce

== Total season attendances ==
Club	Home Games	Total	Average	Highest	Lowest	% Capacity
Blackheath	13	9,582	737	1,453	460	21%
Blaydon	13	4,718	363	614	210	18%
Cambridge	13	7,862	605	1,370	402	27%
Halifax	13	4,660	358	585	220	N/A
Henley Hawks	13	4,741	365	527	190	9%
Manchester	13	4,455	343	563	243	9%
Nuneaton	13	2,690	207	400	100	5%
Otley	13	9,639	741	1,363	461	11%
Redruth	13	10,249	788	968	612	23%
Southend	13	5,985	460	720	250	31%
Stourbridge	13	7,450	573	800	350	16%
Waterloo	12 (Note: Missing home attendance v Southend on 1 March 2008.)	4,552	379	620	286	4%
Westcombe Park	13	4,606	354	1,021	189	11%
Wharfedale	13	6,209	478	1,010	330	24%

== Individual statistics ==
- Note if players are tied on tries or points the player with the lowest number of appearances will come first. Also note that points scorers includes tries as well as conversions, penalties and drop goals.

=== Top points scorers ===
Rank	Player	Team	Appearances	Points
1	(England) Gareth Wynne	Manchester	25	286
2	(England) Andy Frost	Southend	26	282
3	(England) Alastair Bressington	Stourbridge	22	235
4	(England) Robin Kitching	Otley	19	230
5	(England) James Whittingham	Westcombe Park	24	187
6	(England) Joseph Knowles	Halifax	26	179
7	(England) Andrew Baggett	Wharfedale	26	168
8	(England) Alex Davies	Waterloo	22	154
9	(England) Gareth Griffiths	Redruth	20	151
10	(Wales) Gareth Cull	Cambridge	19	142

=== Top try scorers ===
Rank	Player	Team	Appearances	Tries
1	(South Africa) Christoff Lombaard	Cambridge	25	21
2	(Wales) Andrew Fenby	Blaydon	20	18
3	(Samoa) Faapulou Soolefai	Southend	23	17
4	(England) Robin Kitching	Otley	19	15
4	(England) Richard Wainwright	Manchester	25	15
5	(England) Lewis Vinnicombe	Redruth	17	13
5	(England) Andre Wilson	Manchester	23	13
6	(England) Paul Kendal	Cambridge	25	12
7	(England) Ben Coulbeck	Manchester	23	11
7	(England) Andy Frost	Southend	26	11

== Season records ==
=== Team ===
Largest home win — 65 pts

67 - 3 Manchester at home to Halifax on 22 March 2008

Largest away win — 31 pts

39 - 8 Westcombe Park away to Nuneaton on 16 February 2008

Most points scored — 67 pts (x2)

67 - 15 Westcombe Park at home to Nuneaton on 20 October 2007
67 - 3 Manchester at home to Halifax on 22 March 2008

Most tries in a match — 11

Westcombe Park at home to Nuneaton on 20 October 2007

Most conversions in a match — 7 (x4)

Westcombe Park at home to Halifax on 5 January 2008
Manchester at home to Blaydon on 8 March 2008
Southend at home to Henley Hawks on 15 March 2008
Manchester at home to Halifax on 22 March 2008

Most penalties in a match — 4

N/A - multiple teams

Most drop goals in a match — 2 (x3)

Nuneaton away to Blaydon on 13 October 2007
Nuneaton away to Halifax on 27 October 2007
Stourbridge at home to Otley on 15 March 2008

=== Player ===
Most points in a match — 27

(England) Robin Kitching for Otley at home to Blackheath on 19 April 2008

Most tries in a match — 4

(England) Adam Slade for Westcombe Park at home to Nuneaton on 20 October 2007

Most conversions in a match — 7 (x3)

(England) Paul Trendell for Westcombe Park at home to Halifax on 5 January 2008
(England) Gareth Wynne for Manchester at home to Blaydon on 8 March 2008
(England) Gareth Wynne for Manchester at home to Halifax on 22 March 2008

Most penalties in a match — 4

N/A - multiple players

Most drop goals in a match — 2 (x3)

(England) Howard Graham for Nuneaton away to Blaydon on 13 October 2007
(England) Rob Cook for Nuneaton away to Halifax on 27 October 2007
(Australia) Rod Petty for Stourbridge at home to Otley on 15 March 2008

=== Attendances ===
Highest — 1,453

Blackheath at home to Westcombe Park on 24 November 2007

Lowest — 100

Nuneaton at home to Manchester on 10 November 2007

Highest Average Attendance — 788

Redruth

Lowest Average Attendance — 207

Nuneaton

== See also ==
- English Rugby Union Leagues
- English rugby union system
- Rugby union in England
