= Barton Road, Cambridge =

Road in Cambridge, England

Barton Road
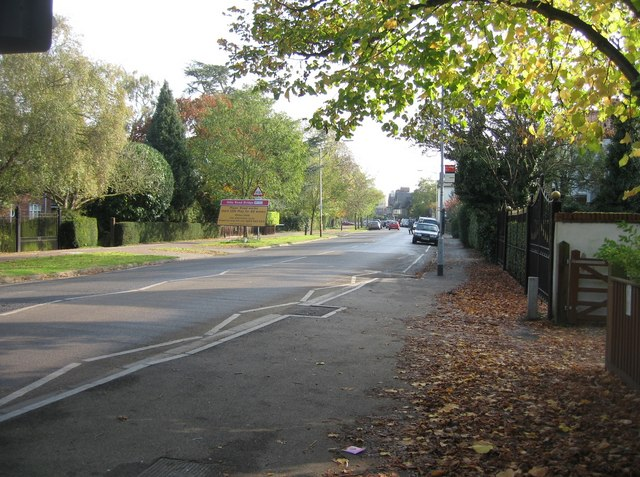
- View towards Cambridge along Barton Road.
- Length: 2.2 mi (3.5 km)
- Postal code: CB23
- Coordinates: 52.1985°N 0.0936°E
- east end: Sheep's Green
- southwest end: J12 → M11 motorway

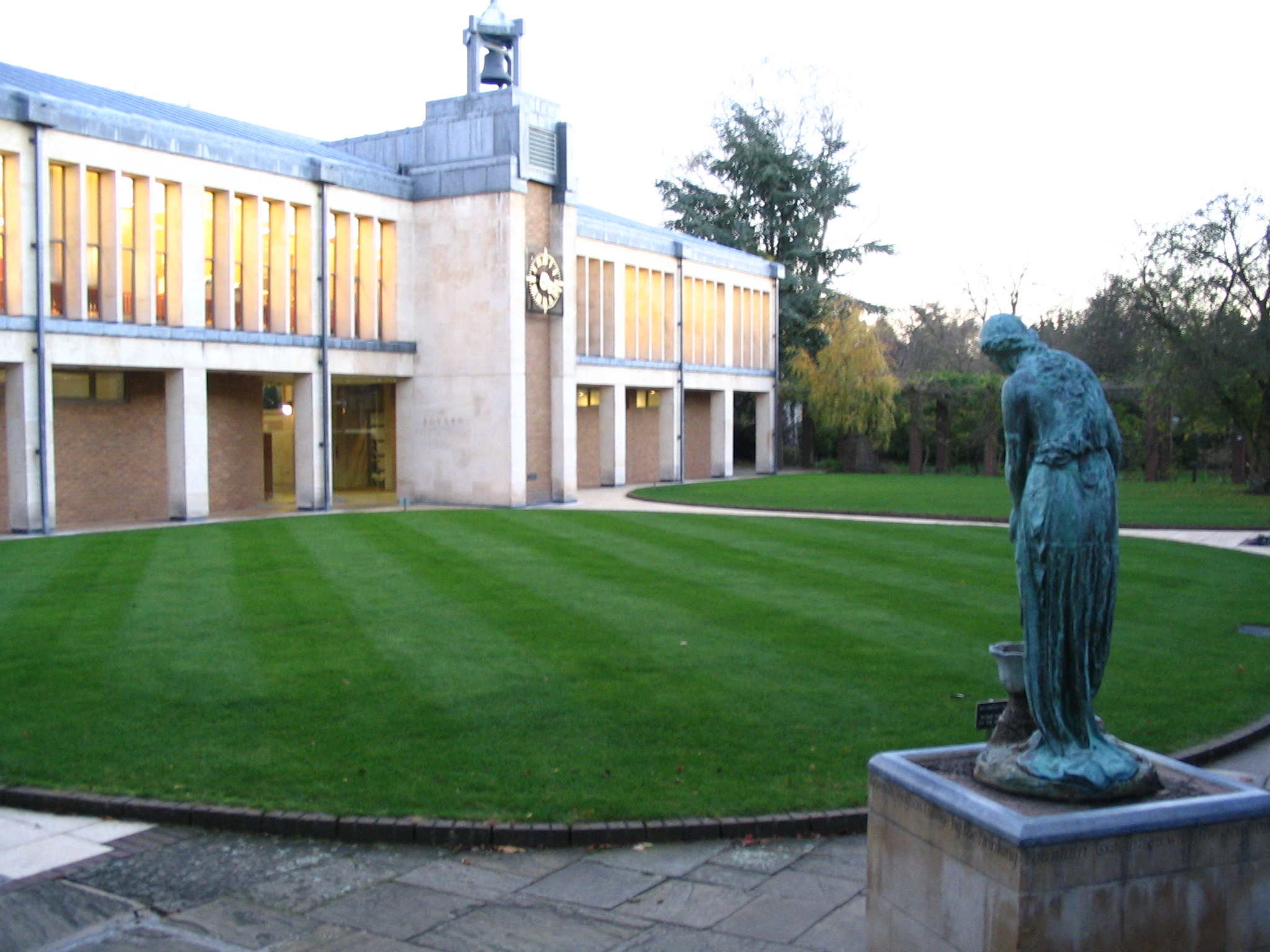
View of Wolfson College on Barton Road

Barton Road is a major arterial road linking central Cambridge, England with Junction 12 of the M11 motorway to the southwest.

== Route ==
The road is designated the A603. At the eastern end the A603 road continues turning northeast as Newnham Road, while Barton Road continues as a minor access road to the car park for Sheep's Green. At the southwestern end, the road crosses the M11 and becomes Cambridge Road, linking with the village of Barton.

== Environment ==
Within Cambridge, Wolfson College, one of the University of Cambridge colleges, is located on the north side of the road, to the west of the junction with Grange Road. To the north is the ward of Newnham and to the south is Newnham Croft.

St Mark's Church is located on Barton Road, a brick church designed by R. Philip Day and built 1902–03.

To the south opposite Wolfson College is Grantchester Road, leading to the village of Grantchester. Off this road just to the south of Barton Road are the Cambridge Rugby Football Ground (West Renault Park, home ground of Cambridge Rugby Union Football Club), Trinity New Field, Pembroke College Sports Ground, and behind that St Catharine's College Sports Ground. Gonville & Caius College's sports ground is at the Eastern end of Barton Road.
