= 2009–10 English Rugby Union Leagues =

== Guinness Premiership ==
=== Season: 2009/2010 ===
Pos	Team	Pld	W	D	L	PF	PA	PD	TF	TA	TB	LB	Pts
1	Leicester Tigers (Q) (C)	22	15	1	6	541	325	+216	46	18	7	4	73
2	Northampton Saints (Q)	22	16	0	6	472	322	+150	44	26	2	5	71
3	Saracens (q) (F)	22	15	1	6	480	367	+113	39	22	2	5	69
4	Bath Rugby (q)	22	12	2	8	450	366	+84	49	33	5	4	61
5	London Wasps	22	13	0	9	394	399	−5	35	31	2	3	57
6	London Irish	22	10	3	9	469	384	+85	42	33	3	3	52
7	Gloucester Rugby	22	10	1	11	470	457	+13	46	42	2	4	48
8	Harlequins	22	9	2	11	420	484	−64	42	46	3	3	46
9	Newcastle Falcons	22	6	4	12	319	431	−112	20	41	1	4	37
10	Leeds Carnegie	22	7	1	14	280	454	−174	17	43	0	6	36
11	Sale Sharks	22	6	1	15	333	495	−162	24	51	0	6	32
12	Worcester Warriors (R)	22	3	4	15	312	420	−108	23	36	0	8	28

Rules for classification: If teams are level at any stage, tiebreakers are applied in the following order:
1. Number of matches won
2. Difference between points for and against
3. Total number of points for
4. Aggregate number of points scored in matches between tied teams
5. Number of matches won excluding the first match, then the second and so on until the tie is settled
  (C) Champions; (Q) Qualified for home play-off; (q) Qualified for away play-off; (F) Losing Finalists; (R) Relegated to Championship; (R) Relegated

== RFU Championship ==
=== Season: 2009/2010 ===
2009–10 RFU Championship table
Pos	Team	Pld	W	D	L	PF	PA	PD	B	Pts	Qualification
1	Bristol	22	19	0	3	630	337	+293	16	92	Promotion playoffs
2	Exeter Chiefs	22	19	0	3	699	360	+339	12	88	Promotion playoffs
3	London Welsh	22	14	1	7	483	376	+107	9	62 (Note: 5 points deducted)	Promotion playoffs
4	Bedford Blues	22	12	1	9	581	436	+145	9	59	Promotion playoffs
5	Nottingham	22	12	0	10	539	520	+19	11	59	Promotion playoffs
6	Cornish Pirates	22	11	1	10	555	463	+92	9	55	Promotion playoffs
7	Doncaster Knights	22	10	0	12	394	386	+8	8	48	Promotion playoffs
8	Plymouth Albion	22	10	1	11	389	462	−73	6	48	Promotion playoffs
9	Moseley	22	10	0	12	444	543	−99	6	46	Relegation playoffs
10	Rotherham Titans	22	7	0	15	451	520	−69	15	43	Relegation playoffs
11	Coventry	22	5	1	16	346	565	−219	5	12 (Note: 15 points deducted)	Relegation playoffs
12	Birmingham & Solihull	22	0	1	21	293	836	−543	4	−9	Relegation playoffs

Updated to match(es) played on 13 March 2010. Source:
Rules for classification: If teams are level at any stage, tiebreakers are applied in the following order:
1. Number of matches won
2. Difference between points for and against
3. Total number of points for
4. Aggregate number of points scored in matches between tied teams
5. Number of matches won excluding the first match, then the second and so on until the tie is settled
  Notes:

== National League 1 ==
2009–10 National League 1 table
Pos	Team	Pld	W	D	L	PF	PA	PD	TB	LB	Pts	Qualification
1	Esher (Note: Esher would only play 29 games as their final game away to Cinderford was cancelled.) (C)	29	28	0	1	1416	338	+1078	22	1	135	Promoted
2	London Scottish	30	22	1	7	938	569	+369	15	3	108	
3	Launceston	30	21	0	9	848	606	+242	17	4	105	
4	Cambridge	30	19	1	10	880	572	+308	14	5	97	
5	Tynedale	30	18	1	11	1008	629	+379	17	5	96	
6	Wharfedale	30	18	0	12	857	666	+191	14	5	91	
7	Blaydon	30	16	0	14	924	679	+245	12	4	80	
8	Blackheath	30	14	1	15	760	730	+30	10	5	73	
9	Sedgley Park	30	13	0	17	827	807	+20	11	8	71	
10	Stourbridge	30	13	0	17	751	799	−48	12	6	70	
11	Redruth	30	12	1	17	675	575	+100	10	9	69	
12	Cinderford (Note: Cinderford would only play 29 games as their final game at home to Esher was cancelled.)	29	12	0	17	753	636	+117	10	8	66	
13	Otley	30	12	1	17	710	811	−101	9	4	63	
14	Newbury (R)	30	12	0	18	671	745	−74	6	7	61	Relegated
15	Nuneaton (R)	30	6	0	24	559	903	−344	4	4	32	Relegated
16	Manchester (R)	30	0	0	30	114	2626	−2512	0	0	0	Relegated

Updated to match(es) played on 8 May 2010. Source: "National One 9/10 League table". Rugby Statbunker.
Rules for classification: If teams are level at any stage, tiebreakers are applied in the following order:
1. Number of matches won
2. Difference between points for and against
3. Total number of points for
4. Aggregate number of points scored in matches between tied teams
5. Number of matches won excluding the first match, then the second and so on until the tie is settled
  (C) Champion; (R) Relegated
  Notes:

== National League 2 ==
=== National League 2 North ===
2009–10 National League 2 North table
Pos	Team	Pld	W	D	L	PF	PA	PD	TB	LB	Pts	Qualification
1	Macclesfield (C)	30	27	0	3	1137	405	+732	20	2	130	Promoted
2	Loughborough Students	30	26	0	4	968	448	+520	21	2	127	Promotion play-off
3	Caldy	30	26	0	4	984	492	+492	18	3	125	
4	Harrogate	30	20	2	8	717	579	+138	15	3	102	
5	Hull	30	17	1	12	646	717	−71	10	1	81	
6	Leicester Lions	30	14	1	15	823	571	+252	12	7	77	
7	Westoe (Note: Westoe's game away to Preston Grasshoppers would be cancelled.)	29	14	0	15	690	780	−90	15	5	76	
8	Rugby Lions	30	13	0	17	665	641	+24	13	7	72	
9	Fylde	30	13	1	16	685	722	−37	11	6	71	
10	Kendal	30	13	1	16	626	802	−176	5	4	63	
11	Huddersfield (Note: Hudderfield's game at home to Hull Ionians would be cancelled.)	29	11	1	17	696	613	+83	7	5	58	
12	Hull Ionians (Note: Hull Ionian's game away to Huddersfield would be cancelled.)	29	11	0	18	557	667	−110	4	6	54	
13	Preston Grasshoppers (Note: Preston Grasshopper's game at home to Westoe would be cancelled.)	29	10	2	17	509	793	−284	6	4	54	
14	Broadstreet (R)	30	7	1	22	567	870	−303	7	7	44	Relegated
15	Bradford & Bingley (R)	30	7	1	22	555	945	−390	8	5	43	Relegated
16	Waterloo (R)	30	3	1	26	434	1214	−780	3	1	18	Relegated

Updated to match(es) played on 08-05-2010. Source: Rugby Statbunker
(C) Champion; (R) Relegated

=== National League 2 South ===
2009–10 National League 2 South table
Pos	Team	Pld	W	D	L	PF	PA	PD	B	Pts	Qualification
1	Barking (C)	28	26	0	2	1060	335	+725	22	124 (Note: Barking deducted 2 points.)	Promoted
2	Rosslyn Park (P)	28	23	1	4	995	423	+572	19	113	Promotion play-off
3	Ealing Trailfinders	28	22	1	5	1014	504	+510	23	113	
4	Southend	28	19	1	8	802	566	+236	17	95	
5	Clifton	28	18	2	8	682	571	+111	15	91	
6	Worthing Raiders	28	16	1	11	653	561	+92	9	75	
7	Canterbury	28	13	1	14	625	780	−155	13	67	
8	Richmond	28	11	0	17	706	761	−55	18	62	
9	Henley Hawks	28	11	1	16	668	598	+70	12	56 (Note: Henley deducted 2 points.)	
10	Shelford	27	11	1	15	550	778	−228	7	53	
11	Dings Crusaders	28	9	2	17	549	697	−148	13	53	
12	Lydney	28	8	0	20	580	807	−227	18	40 (Note: Lydney deducted 10 points.)	
13	Westcombe Park	27	8	0	19	434	832	−398	7	39	
14	Barnes (R)	28	6	1	21	486	916	−430	7	31 (Note: Barnes deducted 2 points.)	Relegated
15	Bridgwater & Albion (R)	28	2	0	26	321	996	−675	4	8 (Note: Bridgwater deducted 4 points.)	Relegated

Updated to match(es) played on 28 April 2012. Source: westcombeparkrugby.co.uk, www.englandrugby.com
Rules for classification: If teams are level at any stage, tiebreakers are applied in the following order:
1. Number of matches won
2. Difference between points for and against
3. Total number of points for
4. Aggregate number of points scored in matches between tied teams
5. Number of matches won excluding the first match, then the second and so on until the tie is settled
  (C) Champion; (P) Promoted; (R) Relegated
  Notes:
