= 2005–06 National Division Three South =

Rugby union competition in England

- Countries: (England)
- Champions: Cambridge
- Runners-up: North Walsham (not promoted)
- Relegated: Bracknell, Reading
- Attendance: 48,647 (average 335 per match) (Note: Note that 37 home attendances are missing (see below) - so the total attendance will not be 100% accurate. The average attendance has also been taken into account with the missing games not included.)
- Highest attendance: 1,150; Cambridge v North Walsham; 11 March 2006
- Lowest attendance: 40; Old Patesians v Southend; 7 January 2006
- Top point scorer: (England) Andy Frost (Southend); 258 points
- Top try scorer: (England) Tom Hayman (Westcombe Park); 24 tries

The 2005–06 National Division Three South was the sixth season (19th overall) of the fourth division (south) of the English domestic rugby union competition using the name National Division Three South. New teams to the division included Bracknell and Rosslyn Park who were relegated from 2004–05 National Division Two while Cambridge came up as champions of London Division 1 along with Cinderford (champions) and Bridgwater & Albion (playoffs) who were promoted from South West Division 1. The league system was 4 points for a win, 2 points for a draw and additional bonus points being awarded for scoring 4 or more tries and/or losing within 7 points of the victorious team. In terms of promotion the league champions would go straight up into National Division Two while the runners up would have a one-game playoff against the runners up from National Division Three North (at the home ground of the club with the superior league record) for the final promotion place.

At the end of the season Cambridge made it two successive promotions in a row, finishing league champions just 2 points ahead of runners up North Walsham (who actually beat them home and away) and gaining promotion to the 2006–07 National Division Two. North Walsham were unable to join Cambridge in National Division Two as they lost their promotion playoff at home to the 2005–06 National Division Three North runners up Nuneaton. At the other end of the table, Bracknell were the first side to be relegated, going down for the second year in a row with just two wins all season. They were followed by Reading who were more competitive but still two wins off the 12th placed team Old Patesians. Both Reading and Bracknell would drop down to South West Division 1.

== Participating teams and locations ==
Locations of the 2005-06 National Division Three South teams

Team	Stadium	Capacity	City/Area
Bracknell	Lily Hill Park	1,250 (250 seats)	Bracknell, Berkshire
Bridgwater & Albion	Bath Road	5,000	Bridgwater, Somerset
Cambridge	Grantchester Road	2,200 (200 seats)	Cambridge, Cambridgeshire
Cinderford	Dockham Road	2,500	Cinderford, Gloucestershire
Dings Crusaders	Landseer Avenue	1,500	Lockleaze, Bristol
Havant	Hook's Lane	2,000 (200 seats)	Havant, Hampshire
Hertford	Highfields		Ware, Hertfordshire
Lydney	Regentsholme	3,000 (340 seats)	Lydney, Gloucestershire
North Walsham	Norwich Road	1,200	Scottow, North Walsham, Norfolk
Old Patesians	Everest Road		Cheltenham, Gloucestershire
Reading	Holme Park		Sonning, Reading, Berkshire
Rosslyn Park	The Rock	2,000 (630 seats)	Roehampton, London
Southend	Warners Park	1,500 (150 seats)	Southend, Essex
Westcombe Park	Goddington Dene	3,200	Orpington, London

== Final league table ==
2005–06 National Division Three South table
Pos	Team	Pld	W	D	L	PF	PA	PD	TB	LB	Pts	Qualification
1	Cambridge (C)	26	23	0	3	865	381	+484	14	0	106	Promoted
2	North Walsham	26	21	0	5	826	403	+423	16	4	104	Promotion play-off
3	Westcombe Park	26	17	0	9	805	566	+239	17	3	88	
4	Lydney	26	17	1	8	618	477	+141	8	5	83	
5	Southend	26	15	2	9	697	561	+136	10	4	78	
6	Rosslyn Park	26	15	0	11	549	444	+105	5	6	71	
7	Bridgwater & Albion	26	13	0	13	725	571	+154	14	5	71	
8	Dings Crusaders	26	11	1	14	551	648	−97	9	4	59	
9	Havant	26	10	0	16	629	650	−21	11	10	56 (Note: 5 points deducted)	
10	Cinderford	26	11	0	15	508	743	−235	5	4	53	
11	Hertford	26	11	0	15	523	764	−241	4	3	51	
12	Old Patesians	26	8	0	18	479	686	−207	6	4	42	
13	Reading (R)	26	6	0	20	526	868	−342	4	6	34	Relegated
14	Bracknell (R)	26	2	0	24	364	903	−539	2	3	13	Relegated

Updated to match(es) played on 22-04-2006. Source: Rugby Statbunker
(C) Champion; (R) Relegated

== Results ==
=== Round 1 ===
3 September 2005

Cambridge	33 - 9	Reading
	Report

Grantchester Road
Referee: Steve Walters

3 September 2005

Dings Crusaders	19 - 17	Bracknell (BP)
	Report

Landseer Avenue
Referee: Andrew Bickle

3 September 2005

(2BP) Havant	29 - 35	Bridgwater & Albion (BP)
	Report

Hook's Lane
Attendance: 526
Referee: Revis Phillips

3 September 2005

Hertford	26 - 8	Westcombe Park
	Report

Highfields
Referee: Paul Kimber

3 September 2005

Lydney	26 - 16	Cinderford
	Report

Regentsholme
Referee: Nick Williams

3 September 2005

(BP) North Walsham	44 - 17	Southend
	Report

Norwich Road
Referee: Ed Turnill

3 September 2005

Old Patesians	24 - 15	Rosslyn Park
	Report

Everest Road
Referee: G O'Hara

=== Round 2 ===
10 September 2005

Bracknell	11 - 10	Havant (BP)
	Report

Lily Hill Park
Attendance: 177
Referee: Richard Parker-Sedgmore

10 September 2005

(BP) Bridgwater & Albion	15 - 20	Hertford
	Report

Bath Road
Attendance: 750
Referee: Andrew Bickle

10 September 2005

Cinderford	0 - 34	North Walsham (BP)
	Report

Dockham Road
Referee: G O'Hara

10 September 2005

(BP) Dings Crusaders	18 - 20	Cambridge
	Report

Landseer Avenue
Attendance: 195
Referee: Paul Kimber

10 September 2005

(BP) Rosslyn Park	26 - 15	Reading
	Report

The Rock
Attendance: 310
Referee: Eric Woodmason

10 September 2005

Southend	30 -10	Old Patesians
	Report

Warners Bridge Park
Referee: Mark Varnon

10 September 2005

(BP) Westcombe Park	30 - 24	Lydney (BP)
	Report

Goddington Dene
Attendance: 250
Referee: Steve Walters

=== Round 3 ===
24 September 2005

Cambridge	24 - 23	Rosslyn Park (BP)
	Report

Grantchester Road
Attendance: 375
Referee: Mark Varnon

24 September 2005

Havant	18 - 11	Dings Crusaders
	Report

Hook's Lane
Referee: Andrew Bickle

24 September 2005

Hertford	20 - 15	Bracknell
	Report

Highfields
Attendance: 400
Referee: Steve Walters

24 September 2005

Lydney	30 - 8	Bridgwater & Albion
	Report

Regentsholme
Attendance: 425
Referee: Steve Harland

24 September 2005

(BP) North Walsham	43 - 17	Westcombe Park
	Report

Norwich Road
Attendance: 383
Referee: Adrian Hartwell

24 September 2005

(BP) Old Patesians	13 - 16	Cinderford
	Report

Everest Road
Attendance: 180
Referee: Rhys Davies

24 September 2005

Reading	33 - 17	Southend
	Report

Holme Park
Referee: Paul Kimber

=== Round 4 ===
8 October 2005

Bracknell	25 - 43	Lydney (BP)
	Report

Lily Hill Park
Attendance: 200
Referee: Ed Turnill

8 October 2005

Bridgwater & Albion	18 - 31	North Walsham (BP)
	Report

Bath Road
Attendance: 500
Referee: Eric Woodmason

8 October 2005

Cinderford	21 - 16	Reading (BP)
	Report

Dockham Road
Referee: Chris Seeley

8 October 2005

(BP) Dings Crusaders	42 - 15	Hertford
	Report

Landseer Avenue
Attendance: 189
Referee: Guy Steel Bodger

8 October 2005

(BP) Havant	46 - 21	Cambridge
	Report

Hook's Lane
Attendance: 697
Referee: David Sainsbury

8 October 2005

Southend	18 - 16	Rosslyn Park (BP)
	Report

Warners Bridge Park
Referee: G O'Hara

8 October 2005

Westcombe Park	18 - 12	Old Patesians (BP)
	Report

Goddington Dene
Attendance: 119
Referee: Tim Miller

=== Round 5 ===
22 October 2005

Cambridge	12 - 3	Southend
	Report

Grantchester Road
Attendance: 415
Referee: Steve Walters

22 October 2005

(BP) Hertford	21 - 27	Havant
	Report

Highfields
Attendance: 380
Referee: G O'Hara

22 October 2005

Lydney	14 - 9	Dings Crusaders (BP)
	Report

Regentsholme
Attendance: 425
Referee: Ian Robinson

22 October 2005

(BP) North Walsham	72 - 13	Bracknell
	Report

Norwich Road
Attendance: 328
Referee: Tim Miller

22 October 2005

(BP) Old Patesians	24 - 37	Bridgwater & Albion (BP)
	Report

Everest Road
Attendance: 180
Referee: Steve Harland

22 October 2005

(BP) Reading	21 - 28	Westcombe Park
	Report

Holme Park
Referee: Andrew Bickle

22 October 2005

(BP) Rosslyn Park	51 - 8	Cinderford
	Report

The Rock
Attendance: 310
Referee: Mark Varnon

=== Round 6 ===
29 October 2005

(BP) Bracknell	21 - 23	Old Patesians
	Report

Lily Hill Park
Attendance: 130
Referee: G O'Hara

29 October 2005

(BP) Bridgwater & Albion	59 - 19	Reading
	Report

Bath Road
Attendance: 700
Referee: Andrew Bickle

29 October 2005

Cinderford	14 - 47	Southend (BP)
	Report

Dockham Road
Referee: Steve Harland

29 October 2005

Dings Crusaders	28 - 14	North Walsham
	Report

Landseer Avenue

29 October 2005

(BP) Havant	35 - 14	Lydney
	Report

Hook's Lane
Attendance: 722
Referee: Tim Miller

29 October 2005

Hertford	16 - 27	Cambridge (BP)
	Report

Highfields
Attendance: 540
Referee: Rhys Davies

29 October 2005

(BP) Westcombe Park	12 - 19	Rosslyn Park
	Report

Goddington Dene
Attendance: 200
Referee: David Sainsbury

=== Round 7 ===
5 November 2005

(BP) Cambridge	61 - 15	Cinderford
	Report

Grantchester Road
Attendance: 330

5 November 2005

(BP) North Walsham	44 - 21	Havant
	Report

Norwich Road
Attendance: 370
Referee: Mark Varnon

5 November 2005

Old Patesians	13 - 12	Dings Crusaders (BP)
	Report

Everest Road
Attendance: 80
Referee: Adrian Hartwell

5 November 2005

(BP) Reading	28 - 12	Bracknell
	Report

Holme Park

5 November 2005

Lydney	P - P	Hertford

- Postponed. Game rescheduled to 4 February 2006.

5 November 2005

Rosslyn Park	P - P	Bridgwater & Albion

- Postponed. Game rescheduled to 4 February 2006.

5 November 2005

Southend	P - P	Westcombe Park

- Postponed. Game rescheduled to 4 February 2006.

=== Round 8 ===
12 November 2005

Bracknell	10 - 26	Rosslyn Park
	Report

Lily Hill Park
Attendance: 126
Referee: Steve Walters

12 November 2005

(BP) Bridgwater & Albion	30 - 18	Southend
	Report

Bath Road
Attendance: 500

12 November 2005

(BP) Dings Crusaders	53 - 13	Reading
	Report

Landseer Avenue
Attendance: 148
Referee: G O'Hara

12 November 2005

(BP) Havant	42 - 28	Old Patesians (BP)
	Report

Hook's Lane
Attendance: 416
Referee: Richard James

12 November 2005

Hertford	5 - 3	North Walsham (BP)
	Report

Highfields
Attendance: 280
Referee: Paul Kimber

12 November 2005

(BP) Lydney	20 - 27	Cambridge
	Report

Regentsholme

12 November 2005

(BP) Westcombe Park	37 - 24	Cinderford (BP)
	Report

Goddington Dene
Attendance: 205
Referee: JP Doyle

=== Round 9 ===
19 November 2005

(BP) Cambridge	36 - 19	Westcombe Park
	Report

Grantchester Road
Attendance: 425
Referee: Chris Seeley

19 November 2005

Cinderford	19 - 12	Bridgwater & Albion (BP)
	Report

Dockham Road
Referee: Tim Miller

19 November 2005

North Walsham	28 - 13	Lydney
	Report

Norwich Road
Attendance: 292
Referee: Richard Phillips

19 November 2005

(BP) Old Patesians	14 - 21	Hertford
	Report

Everest Road
Attendance: 85
Referee: R Steggall

19 November 2005

(BP) Reading	29 - 22	Havant (BP)
	Report

Holme Park
Attendance: 120

19 November 2005

Rosslyn Park	16 - 0	Dings Crusaders
	Report

The Rock
Attendance: 320
Referee: Andrew Bickle

19 November 2005

(BP) Southend	41 - 18	Bracknell
	Report

Warners Bridge Park
Attendance: 210
Referee: Mark Varnon

=== Round 10 ===
26 November 2005

(BP) Bracknell	27 - 46	Cinderford (BP)
	Report

Lily Hill Park
Attendance: 125
Referee: Rhys Davies

26 November 2005

Dings Crusaders	22 - 22	Southend
	Report

Landseer Avenue
Attendance: 243
Referee: Eric Woodmason

26 November 2005

Havant	13 - 11	Rosslyn Park (BP)
	Report

Hook's Lane
Attendance: 597
Referee: G O'Hara

26 November 2005

Hertford	21 - 10	Reading
	Report

Hillfields
Attendance: 220
Referee: Tim Miller

26 November 2005

(BP) Lydney	34 - 10	Old Patesians
	Report

Regentsholme
Attendance: 320
Referee: Paul Kimber

26 November 2005

North Walsham	13 - 3	Cambridge
	Report

Norwich Road
Attendance: 591
Referee: Mark Varnon

26 November 2005

Westcombe Park	P - P	Bridgwater & Albion

- Postponed. Game rescheduled to 18 March 2006.

=== Round 11 ===
3 December 2005

Cambridge	21 - 20	Bridgwater & Albion (BP)
	Report

Grantchester Road
Attendance: 360
Referee: Tim Miller

3 December 2005

(BP) Cinderford	31 - 19	Dings Crusaders
	Report

Dockham Road
Referee: Steve Walters

3 December 2005

Old Patesians	17 - 27	North Walsham
	Report

Everest Road
Attendance: 111
Referee: R Steggall

3 December 2005

Reading	18 - 15	Lydney (BP)
	Report

Holme Park
Attendance: 120
Referee: Andrew Bickle

3 December 2005

Rosslyn Park	18 - 10	Hertford
	Report

The Rock
Attendance: 420
Referee: Richard Parker-Sedgmore

3 December 2005

(BP) Southend	40 - 36	Havant (2BP)
	Report

Warners Bridge Park
Referee: JP Doyle

3 December 2005

(BP) Westcombe Park	26 - 17	Bracknell
	Report

Goddington Dene
Attendance: 300
Referee: Des Headington

=== Round 12 ===
10 December 2005

Bracknell	0 - 24	Bridgwater & Albion (BP)
	Report

Lily Hill Park
Attendance: 104
Referee: Andrew Bickle

10 December 2005

(BP) Dings Crusaders	34 - 24	Westcombe Park (BP)
	Report

Landseer Avenue
Attendance: 147
Referee: Des Headington

10 December 2005

(BP) Havant	18 - 25	Cinderford
	Report

Hook's Lane
Attendance: 625
Referee: Adrian Hartwell

10 December 2005

Hertford	10 - 48	Southend (BP)
	Report

Highfields
Attendance: 260
Referee: G O'Hara

10 December 2005

Lydney	13 - 3	Rosslyn Park
	Report

Regentsholme
Attendance: 580
Referee: Keith Lewis

10 December 2005

(BP) North Walsham	33 - 18	Reading
	Report

Norwich Road
Attendance: 383
Referee: Paul Kimber

10 December 2005

Old Patesians	12 - 57	Cambridge (BP)
	Report

Everest Road
Attendance: 80
Referee: Mark Varnon

=== Round 13 ===
17 December 2005

(BP) Bridgwater & Albion	27 - 14	Dings Crusaders
	Report

Bath Road
Attendance: 950
Referee: Adrian Hartwell

17 December 2005

(BP) Cambridge	57 - 15	Bracknell
	Report

Grantchester Road
Attendance: 650
Referee: Steve Walters

17 December 2005

(BP) Cinderford	17 - 21	Hertford
	Report

Dockham Road
Attendance: 200
Referee: Steve Harland

17 December 2005

(BP) Reading	32 - 3	Old Patesians
	Report

Holme Park
Attendance: 100
Referee: Richard Kelly

17 December 2005

Rosslyn Park	27 - 25	North Walsham (BP)
	Report

The Rock
Attendance: 390
Referee: Rhys Davies

17 December 2005

Southend	8 - 8	Lydney
	Report

Warners Bridge Park
Attendance: 240
Referee: Des Headington

17 December 2005

(BP) Westcombe Park	40 - 38	Havant (2BP)
	Report

Goddington Dene
Referee: David Sainsbury

=== Round 14 ===
7 January 2006

(BP) Cambridge	31 - 0	Dings Crusaders
	Report

Grantchester Road
Attendance: 350
Referee: Rhys Davies

7 January 2006

(BP) Havant	41 - 19	Bracknell
	Report

Hook's Lane
Attendance: 412
Referee: Richard Parker-Sedgmore

7 January 2006

Hertford	26 - 64	Bridgwater & Albion (BP)
	Report

Highfields
Attendance: 420
Referee: David Sainsbury

7 January 2006

(BP) Lydney	26 - 14	Westcombe Park
	Report

Regentsholme
Attendance: 490
Referee: Steve Harland

7 January 2006

North Walsham	27 - 15	Cinderford
	Report

Norwich Road
Attendance: 274
Referee: Guy Steel Bodger

7 January 2006

(BP) Old Patesians	16 - 17	Southend
	Report

Everest Road
Attendance: 40
Referee: Steve Walters

7 January 2006

(BP) Reading	17 - 20	Rosslyn Park
	Report

Holme Park
Attendance: 95
Referee: Eric Woodmason

=== Round 15 ===
14 January 2006

Bracknell	13 - 31	Hertford (BP)
	Report

Lily Hill Park
Attendance: 140
Referee: Mark Varnon

14 January 2006

(BP) Bridgwater & Albion	7 - 14	Lydney
	Report

Bath Road
Attendance: 900
Referee: Andrew Bickle

14 January 2006

(BP) Cinderford	8 - 10	Old Patesians
	Report

Dockham Road
Referee: G O'Hara

14 January 2006

(BP) Dings Crusaders	31 - 29	Havant (2BP)
	Report

Landseer Avenue
Attendance: 243
Referee: Paul Kimber

14 January 2006

Rosslyn Park	17 - 41	Cambridge (BP)
	Report

The Rock
Attendance: 480
Referee: David Sainsbury

14 January 2006

(BP) Southend	42 - 41	Reading (2BP)
	Report

Warners Bridge Park
Attendance: 248
Referee: Tim Miller

14 January 2006

(BP) Westcombe Park	29 - 24	North Walsham (BP)
	Report

Goddington Dene
Attendance: 200
Referee: Steve Walters

=== Round 16 ===
21 January 2006

Cambridge	30 - 3	Havant
	Report

Grantchester Road
Attendance: 275
Referee: Mark Varnon

21 January 2006

(BP) Hertford	45 - 27	Dings Crusaders (BP)
	Report

Highfields
Attendance: 360
Referee: Steve Walters

21 January 2006

(BP) Lydney	39 - 10	Bracknell
	Report

Regentsholme
Attendance: 530
Referee: Richard Kelly

21 January 2006

North Walsham	21 - 7	Bridgwater & Albion
	Report

Norwich Road
Attendance: 360
Referee: Matthew Daubney

21 January 2006

Old Patesians	0 - 29	Westcombe Park (BP)
	Report

Everest Road
Attendance: 80
Referee: Eric Woodmason

21 January 2006

Reading	26 - 51	Cinderford (BP)
	Report

Holme Park
Attendance: 120
Referee: Dino Maddern

21 January 2006

Rosslyn Park	13 - 10	Southend (BP)
	Report

The Rock
Attendance: 280
Referee: G O'Hara

=== Round 17 ===
28 January 2006

Bracknell	5 - 47	North Walsham (BP)
	Report

Lily Hill Park
Attendance: 100
Referee: Tim Miller

28 January 2006

(BP) Bridgwater & Albion	31 - 20	Old Patesians
	Report

Bath Road
Referee: G O'Hara

28 January 2006

Cinderford	16 - 29	Rosslyn Park
	Report

Dockham Road
Referee: Steve Harland

28 January 2006

Dings Crusaders	15 - 31	Lydney (BP)
	Report

Landseer Avenue
Attendance: 327
Referee: David Sainsbury

28 January 2006

Havant	22 - 14	Hertford
	Report

Hook's Lane
Attendance: 387
Referee: Andrew Bickle

28 January 2006

Southend	9 - 24	Cambridge (BP)
	Report

Warners Bridge Park
Referee: Steve Walters

28 January 2006

(BP) Westcombe Park	65 - 19	Reading
	Report

Goddington Dene
Attendance: 400
Referee: Paul Kimber

=== Round 7 (rescheduled games) ===
4 February 2006

(BP) Lydney	43 - 10	Hertford
	Report

Regentsholme
Attendance: 490
Referee: Tom Woolf

- Game rescheduled from 5 November 2005.

4 February 2006

Rosslyn Park	31 - 24	Bridgwater & Albion (2BP)
	Report

The Rock
Attendance: 220
Referee: R Steggall

- Game rescheduled from 5 November 2005.

4 February 2006

(BP) Southend	30 - 34	Westcombe Park (BP)
	Report

Warners Bridge Park
Attendance: 135
Referee: Mark Varnon

- Game rescheduled from 5 November 2005.

=== Round 18 ===
11 February 2006

(BP) Cambridge	74 - 19	Hertford
	Report

Grantchester Road
Attendance: 380
Referee: David Sainsbury

11 February 2006

Lydney	20 - 17	Havant (BP)
	Report

Regentsholme
Referee: JP Doyle

11 February 2006

(BP) North Walsham	46 - 5	Dings Crusaders
	Report

Norwich Road
Attendance: 275
Referee: Matthew Daubney

11 February 2006

(BP) Old Patesians	27 - 13	Bracknell
	Report

Everest Road
Attendance: 60
Referee: Andrew Bickle

11 February 2006

Reading	23 - 41	Bridgwater & Albion (BP)
	Report

Holme Park
Attendance: 90
Referee: Chris Johnson

11 February 2006

Rosslyn Park	19 - 16	Westcombe Park (BP)
	Report

The Rock
Attendance: 280

11 February 2006

(BP) Southend	22 - 27	Cinderford
	Report

Warners Bridge Park
Attendance: 99
Referee: Eric Woodmason

=== Round 19 ===
18 February 2006

(BP) Bracknell	44 - 14	Reading
	Report

Lily Hill Park
Attendance: 200
Referee: Eric Woodmason

18 February 2006

Bridgwater & Albion	0 - 33	Rosslyn Park (BP)
	Report

Bath Road
Attendance: 750
Referee: Keith Lewis

18 February 2006

(BP) Cinderford	13 - 19	Cambridge
	Report

Dockham Road
Referee: Ian Robinson

18 February 2006

Dings Crusaders	25 - 16	Old Patesians
	Report

Landseer Avenue
Attendance: 143
Referee: Steve Walters

18 February 2006

Havant	18 - 36	North Walsham (BP)
	Report

Hook's Lane
Referee: Ed Turnill

18 February 2006

(BP) Hertford	19 - 20	Lydney
	Report

Highfields
Attendance: 270
Referee: G O'Hara

18 February 2006

(BP) Westcombe Park	28 - 40	Southend (BP)
	Report

Goddington Dene
Attendance: 200
Referee: Tim Miller

=== Round 20 ===
25 February 2006

(BP) Cambridge	61 - 0	Lydney
	Report

Grantchester Road
Attendance: 920
Referee: David Sainsbury

25 February 2006

Cinderford	0 - 42	Westcombe Park (BP)
	Report

Dockham Road
Referee: Paul Kimber

25 February 2006

(BP) North Walsham	45 - 17	Hertford
	Report

Norwich Road
Attendance: 290
Referee: Richard Phillips

25 February 2006

Old Patesians	23 - 22	Havant (2BP)
	Report

Everest Road
Attendance: 80
Referee: Steve Harland

25 February 2006

(BP) Reading	26 - 31	Dings Crusaders (BP)
	Report

Holme Park
Attendance: 150
Referee: Andrew Bickle

25 February 2006

(BP) Rosslyn Park	37 - 0	Bracknell
	Report

The Rock
Attendance: 380
Referee: Mark Varnon

25 February 2006

(BP) Southend	33 - 17	Bridgwater & Albion
	Report

Warners Bridge Park
Attendance: 154
Referee: Steve Walters

=== Round 21 ===
4 March 2006

Bracknell	17 - 34	Southend (BP)
	Report

Lily Hill Park
Referee: G O'Hara

4 March 2006

(BP) Bridgwater & Albion	71 - 0	Cinderford
	Report

Bath Road
Attendance: 700
Referee: David Sainsbury

4 March 2006

(BP) Dings Crusaders	24 - 22	Rosslyn Park (BP)
	Report

Landseer Avenue
Referee: Guy Steel Bodger

4 March 2006

(BP) Havant	25 - 18	Reading (BP)
	Report

Hook's Lane
Attendance: 526
Referee: Paul Kimber

4 March 2006

(BP) Hertford	29 - 8	Old Patesians
	Report

Highfields
Attendance: 320
Referee: Eric Woodmason

4 March 2006

(BP) Lydney	24 - 27	North Walsham (BP)
	Report

Regentsholme
Attendance: 680
Referee: Steve Harland

4 March 2006

(BP) Westcombe Park	19 - 25	Cambridge (BP)
	Report

Goddington Dene
Attendance: 200
Referee: Mark Varnon

=== Round 22 ===
11 March 2006

Bridgwater & Albion	11 - 35	Westcombe Park (BP)
	Report

Bath Road
Attendance: 500
Referee: G O'Hara

11 March 2006

Cambridge	12 - 22	North Walsham
	Report

Grantchester Road
Attendance: 1,150
Referee: Greg Garner

11 March 2006

(BP) Old Patesians	31 - 43	Lydney (BP)
	Report

Everest Road
Attendance: 200
Referee: Eric Woodmason

11 March 2006

Reading	31 - 23	Hertford
	Report

Holme Park
Attendance: 100
Referee: Steve Walters

11 March 2006

Rosslyn Park	7 - 27	Havant (BP)
	Report

The Rock
Attendance: 318
Referee: Tim Miller

11 March 2006

Cinderford	P - P	Bracknell

- Postponed. Game rescheduled to 18 March 2006.

11 March 2006

Southend	P - P	Dings Crusaders

- Postponed. Game rescheduled to 18 March 2006.

=== Rounds 10 & 22 (rescheduled games) ===
18 March 2006

Cinderford	16 - 7	Bracknell
	Report

Dockham Road
Referee: Des Headington

- Game rescheduled from 11 March 2006.

18 March 2006

(BP) Southend	45 - 28	Dings Crusaders (BP)
	Report

Warners Bridge Park
Attendance: 140
Referee: Phil Smith

- Game rescheduled from 11 March 2006.

18 March 2006

(BP) Westcombe Park	46 - 24	Bridgwater & Albion (BP)
	Report

Goddington Dene
Referee: Rhys Davies

- Game rescheduled from 26 November 2005.

=== Round 23 ===
25 March 2006

Bracknell	10 - 38	Westcombe Park (BP)
	Report

Lily Hill Park
Attendance: 81
Referee: Mark Varnon

25 March 2006

Bridgwater & Albion	17 - 25	Cambridge
	Report

Bath Road
Attendance: 600
Referee: Steve Walters

25 March 2006

Dings Crusaders	25 - 20	Cinderford (BP)
	Report

Landseer Avenue
Attendance: 124
Referee: G O'Hara

25 March 2006

(BP) Havant	15 - 19	Southend
	Report

Hook's Lane
Attendance: 384

25 March 2006

(BP) Hertford	20 - 26	Rosslyn Park
	Report

Highfields
Attendance: 380
Referee: Rhys Davies

25 March 2006

(BP) Lydney	44 - 0	Reading
	Report

Regentsholme
Attendance: 540
Referee: Andrew Bickle

25 March 2006

(BP) North Walsham	33 - 25	Old Patesians
	Report

Norwich Road
Attendance: 286
Referee: Tim Miller

=== Round 24 ===
1 April 2006

(BP) Bridgwater & Albion	75 - 14	Bracknell
	Report

Bath Road
Referee: Andrew Bickle

1 April 2006

(BP) Cambridge	41 - 13	Old Patesians
	Report

Grantchester Road
Attendance: 550
Referee: Ed Turnill

1 April 2006

(BP) Cinderford	42 - 20	Havant
	Report

Dockham Road
Referee: Chris Seeley

1 April 2006

Reading	11 - 43	North Walsham (BP)
	Report

Holme Park
Attendance: 80
Referee: Adrian Hartwell

1 April 2006

(BP) Rosslyn Park	13 - 19	Lydney
	Report

The Rock
Attendance: 486
Referee: Richard Kelly

1 April 2006

(BP) Southend	55 - 10	Hertford
	Report

Warners Bridge Park
Attendance: 205
Referee: Des Headington

1 April 2006

(BP) Westcombe Park	60 - 7	Dings Crusaders
	Report

Goddington Dene
Referee: David Sainsbury

=== Round 25 ===
8 April 2006

Bracknell	0 - 40	Cambridge (BP)
	Report

Lily Hill Park
Attendance: 109
Referee: Des Headington

8 April 2006

Dings Crusaders	13 - 22	Bridgwater & Albion
	Report

Landseer Avenue
Attendance: 160
Referee: Eric Woodmason

8 April 2006

Havant	23 - 32	Westcombe Park (BP)
	Report

Hook's Lane
Attendance: 499
Referee: Steve Walters

8 April 2006

(BP) Hertford	40 - 23	Cinderford
	Report

Highfields
Attendance: 360
Referee: Terry Hall

8 April 2006

Lydney	18 - 11	Southend (BP)
	Report

Regentsholme
Attendance: 610
Referee: Chris Seeley

8 April 2006

(BP) North Walsham	24 - 17	Rosslyn Park (BP)
	Report

Norwich Road
Attendance: 693
Referee: Ed Turnill

8 April 2006

(BP) Old Patesians	53 - 19	Reading
	Report

Everest Road
Attendance: 250
Referee: David Sainsbury

=== Round 26 ===
22 April 2006

Bracknell	11 - 29	Dings Crusaders (BP)
	Report

Lily Hill Park
Attendance: 230
Referee: Andrew Bickle

22 April 2006

(BP) Bridgwater & Albion	29 - 12	Havant
	Report

Bath Road
Attendance: 650
Referee: Steve Harland

22 April 2006

Cinderford	25 - 23	Lydney (BP)
	Report

Dockham Road
Referee: Chris Seeley

22 April 2006

Reading	20 - 43	Cambridge (BP)
	Report

Holme Park
Attendance: 190
Referee: Mark Varnon

22 April 2006

Rosslyn Park	13 - 34	Old Patesians (BP)
	Report

The Rock
Attendance: 420
Referee: Adrian Hartwell

22 April 2006

Southend	21 - 20	North Walsham (2BP)
	Report

Warners Bridge Park
Attendance: 450
Referee: David Sainsbury

22 April 2006

(BP) Westcombe Park	59 - 14	Hertford
	Report

Goddington Dene
Attendance: 350
Referee: Paul Kimber

=== Promotion play-off ===
The league runners up of National Division Three South and North would meet in a playoff game for promotion to National Division Two. North Walsham were the southern division runners up and as they had a superior league record than northern runners-up, Nuneaton, they hosted the play-off match.

13 May 2006

North Walsham	5 - 15	Nuneaton
	Report

Norwich Road
Attendance: 1,302
Referee: Nick Williams

== Total season attendances ==
- Does not include promotion playoff game.

Club	Home Games	Total	Average	Highest	Lowest	% Capacity
Bracknell	12 (Note: Missing home attendance v Southend on 4 March 2006.)	1,722	144	230	81	12%
Bridgwater & Albion	11 (Note: Missing home attendances v Old Patesians on 28 January 2006 and Bracknell on 1 April 2006.)	7,500	682	950	500	14%
Cambridge	12 (Note: Missing home attendance v Reading on 3 September 2005.)	6,180	515	1,150	275	23%
Cinderford	1 (Note: Missing home attendances v North Walsham on 10 September 2005, Reading on 8 October 2005, Southend on 29 October 2005, Bridgwater & Albion on 19 November 2005, Dings Crusaders on 3 December 2005, Old Patesians on 14 January 2006, Rosslyn Park on 28 January 2006, Cambridge on 18 February 2006, Westcombe Park on 25 February 2006, Bracknell on 18 March 2006, Havant on 1 April 2006 and Lydney on 22 April 2006.)	200	200	200	200	8%
Dings Crusaders	10 (Note: Missing home attendances v Bracknell on 3 September 2005, North Walsham on 29 October 2005 and Rosslyn Park on 4 March 2006.)	1,919	192	327	124	13%
Havant	11 (Note: Missing home attendances v Dings Crusaders on 24 September 2005 and North Walsham on 18 February 2006.)	5,791	526	722	384	26%
Hertford	12 (Note: Missing home attendance v Westcombe Park on 3 September 2005.)	4,190	349	540	220	
Lydney	10 (Note: Missing home attendances v Cinderford on 3 September 2005, Cambridge on 12 November 2005 and Havant on 11 February 2006.)	5,090	509	680	320	17%
North Walsham	12 (Note: Missing home attendance v Southend on 3 September 2005.)	4,525	377	693	274	31%
Old Patesians	12 (Note: Missing home attendance v Rosslyn Park on 3 September 2005.)	1,426	119	250	40	
Reading	10 (Note: Missing home attendances v Southend on 24 September 2005, Westcombe Park on 22 October 2005, Bracknell on 5 November 2005 and Havant on 19 November 2005.)	1,185	119	190	80	
Rosslyn Park	13	4,614	355	486	220	18%
Southend	9 (Note: Missing home attendances v Old Patesians on 10 September 2005, Rosslyn Park on 8 October 2005, Havant on 3 December 2005 and Cambridge on 28 January 2006.)	1,881	209	450	99	14%
Westcombe Park	10 (Note: Missing home attendances v Havant on 17 December 2005, Bridgwater & Albion on 18 March 2006 and Dings Crusaders on 1 April 2006.)	2,424	242	400	119	8%

== Individual statistics ==
- Note that points scorers includes tries as well as conversions, penalties and drop goals.

=== Top points scorers ===
Rank	Player	Team	Appearances	Points
1	(England) Andy Frost	Southend	25	258
2	(England) James Cathcart	Reading	25	227
3	(Australia) Andrew Dickson	North Walsham	22	224
4	(Wales) Dafydd Lewis	Cambridge	24	213
5	(England) Daniel Trigg	Cinderford	26	210
6	(England) Richard Mahoney	Rosslyn Park	20	180
7	(New Zealand) Jervis Manupenu	Bracknell	23	165
8	(England) Neil Barrela	Hertford	19	155
9	(England) Adam Westall	Lydney	9	133
10	(Wales) Iestyn Williams	Dings Crusaders	17	129

=== Top try scorers ===
Rank	Player	Team	Appearances	Tries
1	(England) Tom Hayman	Westcombe Park	21	24
2	(South Africa) Christoff Lombaard	Cambridge	25	22
3	(Samoa) Faapoloo Soolefai	Bridgwater & Albion	22	19
4	(England) Andy Thorpe	North Walsham	24	18
5	(New Zealand) Cam Avery	Havant	26	16
6	(England) James Shanahan	Cambridge	26	15
7	(England) Neil Barrela	Hertford	19	14
7	(South Africa) Jaco du Toit	Southend	24	14
8	(Ireland) Ryan O'Shaughnessy	Southend	13	13
9	(England) Marcus McCluggage	Rosslyn Park	23	12
9	(England) Andy Frost	Southend	25	12

== Season records ==
=== Team ===
Largest home win — 71 pts

71 - 0 Bridgwater & Albion at home to Cinderford on 4 March 2006

Largest away win — 42 pts

47 - 5 North Walsham away to Bracknell on 28 January 2006

Most points scored — 75 pts

75 - 14 Bridgwater & Albion at home to Bracknell on 1 April 2006

Most tries in a match — 13

Bridgwater & Albion at home to Bracknell on 1 April 2006

Most conversions in a match — 8 (x3)

North Walsham at home to Bracknell on 22 October 2005
Cambridge at home to Cinderford on 5 November 2005
Bridgwater & Albion at home to Cinderford on 4 March 2006

Most penalties in a match — 6

Lydney at home to Bridgwater & Albion on 24 September 2005

Most drop goals in a match — 2

Rosslyn Park at home to Westcombe Park on 11 February 2006

=== Player ===
Most points in a match — 25

(England) Andy Frost for Southend at home to Hertford on 1 April 2006

Most tries in a match — 4 (x3)

(South Africa) Altus Laubscher for Cambridge at home to Hertford on 11 February 2006
(England) Mike Griffiths for Bridgwater & Albion at home to Cinderford on 4 March 2006
(England) Adam Roberts for Hertford at home to Cinderford on 8 April 2006

Most conversions in a match — 8

(England) Andrew Dickson for North Walsham at home to Bracknell on 22 October 2005

Most penalties in a match — 6

(England) Adam Westall for Lydney at home to Bridgwater & Albion on 24 September 2005

Most drop goals in a match — 2

(England) Richard Mahony for Rosslyn Park at home to Westcombe Park on 11 February 2006

=== Attendances ===
Highest — 1,150

Cambridge at home to North Walsham on 11 March 2006

Lowest — 40

Old Patesians at home to Southend on 7 January 2006

Highest Average Attendance — 682

Bridgwater & Albion

Lowest Average Attendance — 119 (x2)

Old Patesians and Reading

== See also ==
- English rugby union system
- Rugby union in England
