= Andy Frost (rugby union) =

Andrew Frost
- Born: 3 October 1983 (age 43)
- Height: 5 ft 10 in (1.78 m)
- Weight: 184 lb (83 kg)

Rugby union career
- Position: Fullback
- Current team: dorkimg rugby club
Senior career
Years	Team	Apps	(Points)
2002–04	Gloucester	20 2nds	(91)
2004–05	Bracknell	25	(172)
2005–13	Southend	160	(1763)
2013–15	Dorking	28	(100)

Andrew Frost (born 1983) is a retired English rugby union player who played mostly at fullback A former Saracens Academy player and England youth international, Andy made his name with Southend. An excellent spot kicker who could also score tries, he scored over 1,700 points for the Essex club, also becoming one of the most prolific scorers of all-time in National League 2 South. He retired in 2015 due to injury.

== Career ==
=== Early career ===
Andy started his rugby career with the Saracens Academy before moving to Gloucester in 2002. While at Gloucester he made appearances for the second team as well as for England at under-21 level but suffered a dislocated shoulder which curtailed his progress. Unable to make the Gloucester first team, Andy dropped several divisions to play for Bracknell in National Division Two during the 2004 – 05 season. Initially understudy to Neil Hallett (until he left part way through the season to join Esher), Andy became the main man at the Berkshire club making 19 appearances and finishing in the top ten league points scorers with 172 points. Despite his efforts he was unable to keep Bracknell up as they were relegated at the end of the season, just 3 points clear from safety.

=== Southend RFC ===
For the 2005 – 06 season, Andy returned to his boyhood county Essex to join Southend playing in National Division 3 South. Southend had struggled somewhat the previous season but they would finish the year in a respectable 6th place, thanks to Andy's accuracy from the tee as he ended up the division's top point's scorer with 258 points. The 2007 – 08 season was even better as Southend ended up as league champions and gained promotion to National Division Two (the highest level the club had reached in its history), with Andy once again the league's top scorer with a massive 335 points.

Life in National 2 was tougher for the promoted but they managed to stay in the division and Andy continued his fine form by finishing as the second top scorer in the league with 282 (just four points behind the top scorer, Gareth Wynne). Southend suffered second season syndrome the next year in what was a very competitive National 2. With the RFU looking to implement widespread divisional changes the league would have four going down that season instead of the usual three. In the end Southend finished way off safety and were relegated in 12th place with Andy being injured at the latter end of the season.

Back in (the newly named) National League 2 South, Southend prevented a free-fall down the divisions by finishing 4th for the 2009 – 10 season with Andy scoring regularly once he had returned from injury. The next year saw Andy score 330 points in a Southend side that finished 4th once again. The next couple of seasons would see Southend start to slide down to occupy a mid-table position in the league and Andy started to get less and less game time.

=== Dorking RFC ===
For the 2013–14 season, Andy dropped down a division to join ambitious Surrey side, Dorking, playing in National League 3 London & SE. He had a fantastic debut season with his new side, playing in almost every game and scoring regularly as they finished as champions and gained promotion to National League 2 South. Unfortunately Andy's next season would be his last as he suffered a shoulder injury in the first game of the new season – ironically against former club Southend in a game his side won 18–13 with Andy scoring all 18 points.

== Season-by-season playing stats ==
Season	Club	Competition	Appearances	Tries	Drop Goals	Conversions	Penalties	Total Points
2002–03	Gloucester	Zurich Premiership	0	0	0	0	0	0
2003–04	Gloucester	Zurich Premiership	0	0	0	0	0	0
2004–05	Bracknell	National Division 2	19	5	0	27	31	172
2004–05	Bracknell	Powergen Cup	1	0	0	0	0	0
2005–06	Southend	National Division 3 South	25	12	0	48	34	258
2005–06	Southend	EDF Energy Trophy	3	1	0	5	7	36
2006–07	Southend	National Division 3 South	26	12	1	94	28	335
2007–08	Southend	National Division 2	26	11	1	58	36	282
2008–09	Southend	National Division 2	14	8	0	29	21	161
2008–09	Southend	EDF Energy Trophy	2	0	0	0	0	0
2009–10	Southend	National League 2 South	18	2	0	47	36	212
2010–11	Southend	National League 2 South	25	16	0	63	38	320
2011–12	Southend	National League 2 South	14	3	0	24	19	120
2012–13	Southend	National League 2 South	7	1	0	11	4	39
2013–14 (Note: Due to poor club and media coverage it is not known how many games Andy played this season or how many points he scored. However, it is likely that he played in almost all Dorking's games and was one of the league's top scorers as he had already had 169 points by December.)	Dorking	National League 3 London & SE	?	?	?	?	?	?
2014–15	Dorking	National League 2 South	2	0	0	0	6	18

== Honours and records ==
Southend

- National Division 3 South champions: 2006–07
- National Division 3 South top scorer (2): 2005–06 (258 points), 2006–07 (335 points)

Dorking

- National League 3 London & SE champions: 2013–14

International

- Represented England at under-21 level
