= Billy Walker (rugby union) =

English rugby union player (born 1996)

- Born: Billy Walker; 27 September 1996 (age 30) England
- Height: 1.88 m (6 ft 2 in)
- Weight: 124 kg (273 lb; 19 st 7 lb)
- University: Oaklands College

Rugby union career
- Position: Tighthead Prop
Amateur team(s)
Years	Team	Apps	(Points)
2015–16	Bishop's Stortford RFC	10	(0)
2016–17	Ampthill RUFC		
Senior career
Years	Team	Apps	(Points)
2016–2017	Bedford Blues	7	(0)
2016-2019	Saracens	7	(0)
2017-2018	Old Albanians	11	(0)
2018-2020	Nottingham R.F.C.	6	(0)
2020-	Cambridge R.F.C.		
- Correct as of 10 August 2019
International career
Years	Team	Apps	(Points)
2015-2016	England U18	4	
2016-2017	England U20		

Billy Walker (born 1996) is a rugby union tighthead prop, currently playing for Cambridge RFC. He has previously played for premiership team Saracens, and has U18 and U20 English international honours.

== Youth and amateur career ==
Walker's first rugby was played at local Chelmsford RFC, in their most junior youth team, the U6s, where he was coached by his father, playing with Chelmsford up to U16. He would also play for Essex county between U13 & U14s.

He was identified for the Saracens junior academy at the age of 14, where he would do a weekly training session until the age of 16, before moving to more full time training with the senior academy. His first year of senior rugby was played with Bishop's Stortford, then in National league 2, where he praised the benefits of playing against older players and being educated in "the tricks of the trade".

== Professional career ==
On turning 19, Walker moved to play a season with Saracens' dual registration team, Bedford Blues, in the Championship. He would also play games with National League 2 team Ampthill, one of two players to act as a trial use of Ampthill as a dual-registration side.

In early 2016 Walker ruptured his plantar plate in his foot and was out of action for 4 months after undergoing surgery.

In November 2016 Walker played his 1st team Saracens debut against Newcastle Falcons, in the LV Cup, after being picked but not played the previous week against Gloucester.

Alongside scattered 1st team games, Walker played the 2017/18 season with Old Albanians. He would also gain a Business Planning Foundation degree.

At the end of the 2018/19 season, Walker announced his move to Nottingham RFC, in order to guarantee regular 1st team gameplay.

At the end of the 2019/20 season Walker announced a move to Cambridge Rugby Club.

== International career ==
Walker was selected for the England U18 team and played his debut against France before playing in all games of the 3-match tour to South Africa.

After missing the U20 6 nations due to his ruptured plantar plate, he was able to return to training a month earlier than anticipated, making him eligible to be picked for the U20 world championship. He would perform successfully, including playing in the final defeating Ireland to win the tournament.
