= Faapulou Soolefai =

- Born: 8 May 1977 (age 49)
- Height: 6 ft 0 in (183 cm)
- Weight: 204 lb (93 kg)

Rugby union career
- Position: Centre / Wing
Provincial / State sides
Years	Team	Apps	(Points)
1999–01	Taranaki	33	(60)
2008–09	Wanganui	10	(35)
International career
Years	Team	Apps	(Points)
1999–01	Samoa	9	(0)

Faapulou Soolefai (born 8 May 1977) is a Samoan former international rugby union player.

== Rugby career ==
A three-quarter, Soolefai had only just starting playing rugby before gaining Samoa under-16s representative honours. He was capped nine times for the full national team between 1999 and 2001, which included overseas matches against Wales, Scotland and the All Blacks. During this time, Soolefai played provincial rugby in New Zealand with Taranaki.

Soolefai competed in England for Bridgwater & Albion in the 2005–06 season, then had a successful stint with Southend, where he proved a regular try scorer. He crossed for 32 tries to help Southend claim the 2006–07 National Division Three South title, earning them promotion to National Division Two. After one more season at Southend, bowing out with a hat-trick against Henley, Soolefai played provincial rugby for Wanganui in 2008 and 2009.

== See also ==
- List of Samoa national rugby union players
