= Bob Steven =

- Full name: Robert Steven
- Born: 19 February 1937 Newburn, Fife, Scotland
- Died: 2014 (aged 77)

Rugby union career
- Position: Prop
International career
Years	Team	Apps	(Points)
1962	Scotland	1	(0)

Robert Steven (19 February 1937 — 2014) was a Scottish international rugby union player.

Born in Newburn, Fife, Steven attended Buckhaven High School and was a cousin of rugby administrator Jock Steven. He was one of five brothers to play rugby for Howe of Fife, which captained in 1959–60.

Steven gained a Scotland cap in a win over Ireland at Lansdowne Road in the 1962 Five Nations, deputising David Rollo in the front row. His selection came while an Edinburgh Wanderers player and he also spent time in England, representing Eastern Counties and Norfolk.

== See also ==
- List of Scotland national rugby union players
