= 2006–07 National Division Three South =

Rugby union competition in England

- Countries: (England)
- Champions: Southend
- Runners-up: Westcombe Park (also promoted)
- Relegated: Chinnor, Old Patesians, Hertford
- Attendance: 50,027 (average 311 per match) (Note: Note that 21 home attendances are missing (see below) - so the total attendance will not be 100% accurate. The average attendance has also been taken into account with the missing games not included.)
- Highest attendance: 1,120; Lydney v Cinderford; 17 March 2007
- Lowest attendance: 50; Old Patesians v Hertford; 21 April 2007
- Top point scorer: (England) Andy Frost (Southend); 335 points
- Top try scorer: (Samoa) Faapoloo Soolefai (Southend); 32 tries

The 2006–07 National Division Three South was the seventh season (20th overall) of the fourth division (south) of the English domestic rugby union competition using the name National Division Three South. New teams to the division only included promoted teams from lower leagues (there had been no relegation from the 2005–06 National Division Two) including Canterbury who came up as champions of London Division 1, while Chinnor (champions) and Clifton (playoffs) came up from South West Division 1. The league system was 4 points for a win, 2 points for a draw and additional bonus points being awarded for scoring 4 or more tries and/or losing within 7 points of the victorious team. In terms of promotion the league champions would go straight up into National Division Two while the runners up would have a one-game playoff against the runners up from National Division Three North (at the home ground of the club with the superior league record) for the final promotion place.

In what was a close title race, Southend edged out Westcombe Park to take the title by just two points (and promotion to the 2007–08 National Division Two), despite the London side having a much superior for and against points record. Westcombe Park would join Southend in the following seasons National Division Two by defeating 2006–07 National Division Three North runners up Tynedale at Goddington Dene in the promotion playoff. At the other end of the table newly promoted Chinnor went straight back down as the first team to be relegated, followed closely by Cheltenham-based side Old Patesians. Hertford were the final team to go down, being much more competitive but eventually finishing two points below 11th placed Clifton. Chinnor and Old Patesians would join South West Division 1 while Hertford would fall to London Division 1.

== Participating teams and locations ==
Locations of the 2006-07 National Division Three South teams

Team	Stadium	Capacity	City/Area
Bridgwater & Albion	Bath Road	5,000	Bridgwater, Somerset
Canterbury	Merton Lane	1,500 (75 seats)	Canterbury, Kent
Chinnor	Kingsey Road	2,000	Thame, Oxfordshire
Cinderford	Dockham Road	2,500	Cinderford, Gloucestershire
Clifton	Station Road	2,200 (200 seats)	Clifton, Bristol
Dings Crusaders	Landseer Avenue	1,500	Lockleaze, Bristol
Havant	Hook's Lane	2,000 (200 seats)	Havant, Hampshire
Hertford	Highfields		Ware, Hertfordshire
Lydney	Regentsholme	3,000 (340 seats)	Lydney, Gloucestershire
North Walsham	Norwich Road	1,200	Scottow, North Walsham, Norfolk
Old Patesians	Everest Road		Cheltenham, Gloucestershire
Rosslyn Park	The Rock	2,000 (630 seats)	Roehampton, London
Southend	Warners Park	1,500 (150 seats)	Southend, Essex
Westcombe Park	Goddington Dene	3,200 (200 seats)	Orpington, London

== Final league table ==
2006–07 National Division Three South table
Pos	Team	Pld	W	D	L	PF	PA	PD	TB	LB	Pts	Qualification
1	Southend (C)	26	22	0	4	944	547	+397	18	1	107	Promoted
2	Westcombe Park (P)	26	21	1	4	943	418	+525	17	2	105	Promotion play-off
3	Havant	26	17	0	9	736	433	+303	15	3	86	
4	Canterbury	26	17	0	9	778	516	+262	16	1	85	
5	Lydney	26	17	0	9	710	562	+148	11	4	83	
6	Bridgwater & Albion	26	15	1	10	645	499	+146	13	4	79	
7	North Walsham	26	14	1	11	515	607	−92	10	2	66 (Note: 4 points deducted)	
8	Cinderford	26	12	0	14	520	513	+7	5	5	58	
9	Dings Crusaders	26	9	3	14	445	628	−183	5	4	51	
10	Rosslyn Park	26	10	0	16	485	664	−179	5	3	48	
11	Clifton	26	8	1	17	531	675	−144	6	6	46	
12	Hertford (R)	26	8	0	18	476	780	−304	7	5	44	Relegated
13	Old Patesians (R)	26	4	0	22	447	751	−304	4	8	28	Relegated
14	Chinnor (R)	26	4	1	21	367	949	−582	2	4	24	Relegated

Updated to match(es) played on 28-04-2007. Source: Rugby Statbunker
(C) Champion; (P) Promoted; (R) Relegated

== Results ==
=== Round 1 ===
2 September 2006

Chinnor	16 - 15	Clifton (BP)
	Report

Kingsey Road
Attendance: 186
Referee: David Sainsbury

2 September 2006

(BP) Cinderford	10 - 13	Bridgwater & Albion
	Report

Dockham Road
Referee: Darren Gamage

2 September 2006

(BP) Dings Crusaders	27 - 30	Southend (BP)
	Report

Landseer Avenue
Referee: Andrew Bickle

2 September 2006

(BP) Havant	15 - 22	Lydney (BP)
	Report

Hook's Lane
Referee: Eric Woodmason

2 September 2006

Hertford	21 - 19	Old Patesians (BP)
	Report

Highfields
Attendance: 385
Referee: Philip Davis

2 September 2006

(BP) North Walsham	29 - 10	Canterbury
	Report

Norwich Road
Attendance: 381
Referee: Mark Varnon

2 September 2006

(BP) Westcombe Park	43 - 5	Rosslyn Park
	Report

Goddington Dene
Referee: Steve Walters

=== Round 2 ===
9 September 2006

Bridgwater & Albion	19 - 9	Dings Crusaders
	Report

Bath Road
Attendance: 700
Referee: Keith Lewis

9 September 2006

Canterbury	3 - 16	Westcombe Park
	Report

Merton Lane
Attendance: 268
Referee: Paul Kimber

9 September 2006

(2BP) Chinnor	30 - 34	Hertford (BP)
	Report

Kingsey Road
Attendance: 250

9 September 2006

Clifton	16 - 25	Cinderford
	Report

Station Road
Referee: Andrew Bickle

9 September 2006

(BP) Lydney	44 - 20	Old Patesians
	Report

Regentsholme
Attendance: 655
Referee: Steve Harland

9 September 2006

Rosslyn Park	3 - 39	Havant (BP)
	Report

The Rock
Attendance: 440

9 September 2006

(BP) Southend	41 - 29	North Walsham (BP)
	Report

Warners Bridge Park
Attendance: 159
Referee: JP Doyle

=== Round 3 ===
16 September 2006

(BP) Cinderford	32 - 7	Chinnor
	Report

Dockham Road
Attendance: 280
Referee: K White

16 September 2006

Dings Crusaders	22 - 17	Clifton (BP)
	Report

Landseer Avenue
Attendance: 250
Referee: Mark Varnon

16 September 2006

(BP) Havant	31 - 47	Canterbury (BP)
	Report

Hook's Lane
Referee: Richard Parker-Sedgmore

16 September 2006

Hertford	23 - 44	Lydney (BP)
	Report

Highfields
Attendance: 260
Referee: Keith Lewis

16 September 2006

(BP) North Walsham	32 - 18	Bridgwater & Albion
	Report

Norwich Road
Attendance: 379
Referee: David Sainsbury

16 September 2006

(BP) Old Patesians	29 - 20	Rosslyn Park
	Report

Everest Road
Attendance: 111
Referee: JP Doyle

16 September 2006

(2BP) Westcombe Park	38 - 42	Southend (BP)
	Report

Goddington Dene
Attendance: 300
Referee: Eric Woodmason

=== Round 4 ===
23 September 2006

(2BP) Bridgwater & Albion	26 - 27	Westcombe Park (BP)
	Report

Bath Road
Attendance: 650
Referee: G O'Hara

23 September 2006

(BP) Canterbury	33 - 10	Old Patesians
	Report

Merton Lane
Attendance: 184
Referee: Keith Lewis

23 September 2006

Chinnor	30 - 30	Dings Crusaders (BP)
	Report

Kingsey Road
Referee: Paul Kimber

23 September 2006

(BP) Cinderford	25 - 30	Hertford (BP)
	Report

Dockham Road
Attendance: 200
Referee: Mark Liddell

23 September 2006

(BP) Clifton	10 - 17	North Walsham
	Report

Station Road
Attendance: 80
Referee: Steve Walters

23 September 2006

(BP) Rosslyn Park	24 - 43	Lydney (BP)
	Report

The Rock
Attendance: 280
Referee: Andrew Bickle

23 September 2006

Southend	15 - 13	Havant (BP)
	Report

Warners Bridge Park
Referee: P.W Davies

=== Round 5 ===
30 September 2006

Dings Crusaders	20 - 10	Cinderford
	Report

Landseer Avenue
Attendance: 241
Referee: P.W Davies

30 September 2006

(BP) Havant	44 - 10	Bridgwater & Albion
	Report

Hook's Lane
Attendance: 390
Referee: Paul Kimber

30 September 2006

(BP) Hertford	24 - 28	Rosslyn Park (BP)
	Report

Highfields
Attendance: 240
Referee: Steve Walters

30 September 2006

(BP) Lydney	44 - 25	Canterbury
	Report

Regentsholme
Referee: Eric Woodmason

30 September 2006

(BP) North Walsham	27 - 22	Chinnor (BP)
	Report

Norwich Road
Referee: Keith Lewis

30 September 2006

Old Patesians	23 - 15	Southend
	Report

Everest Road
Attendance: 87
Referee: G O'Hara

30 September 2006

(BP) Westcombe Park	40 - 8	Clifton
	Report

Goddington Dene
Attendance: 250
Referee: JP Doyle

=== Round 6 ===
7 October 2006

Bridgwater & Albion	22 - 17	Old Patesians (BP)
	Report

Bath Road
Attendance: 600
Referee: Mark Liddell

7 October 2006

(BP) Canterbury	30 - 27	Rosslyn Park (2BP)
	Report

Merton Lane
Attendance: 234
Referee: G O'Hara

7 October 2006

Chinnor	8 - 85	Westcombe Park (BP)
	Report

Kingsey Road
Attendance: 185
Referee: Steve Walters

7 October 2006

(BP) Cinderford	26 - 32	North Walsham (BP)
	Report

Dockham Road
Attendance: 180
Referee: JP Doyle

7 October 2006

Clifton	13 - 30	Havant (BP)
	Report

Station Road
Referee: Andrew Bickle

7 October 2006

Dings Crusaders	14 - 26	Hertford (BP)
	Report

Landseer Avenue
Attendance: 90
Referee: Paul Kimber

7 October 2006

(BP) Southend	81 - 16	Lydney
	Report

Warners Bridge Park
Attendance: 106
Referee: David Sainsbury

=== Round 7 ===
14 October 2006

(BP) Havant	55 - 10	Chinnor
	Report

Hook's Lane
Attendance: 320
Referee: G O'Hara

14 October 2006

(BP) Hertford	17 - 19	Canterbury
	Report

Highfields
Attendance: 470
Referee: JP Doyle

14 October 2006

(BP) Lydney	37 - 10	Bridgwater & Albion
	Report

Regentsholme
Attendance: 620
Referee: S Leyshon

14 October 2006

North Walsham	20 - 13	Dings Crusaders (BP)
	Report

Norwich Road
Attendance: 370
Referee: Mark Liddell

14 October 2006

(BP) Old Patesians	54 - 26	Clifton (BP)
	Report

Everest Road
Attendance: 120
Referee: Andrew Taylorson

14 October 2006

Rosslyn Park	24 - 41	Southend (BP)
	Report

The Rock
Attendance: 330
Referee: Andrew Bickle

14 October 2006

(BP) Westcombe Park	43 - 17	Cinderford
	Report

Goddington Dene
Attendance: 250
Referee: Paul Kimber

=== Round 8 ===
21 October 2006

(BP) Bridgwater & Albion	30 - 3	Rosslyn Park
	Report

Bath Road
Attendance: 650
Referee: Paul Kimber

21 October 2006

Chinnor	20 - 19	Old Patesians (BP)
	Report

Kingsey Road
Attendance: 176
Referee: JP Doyle

21 October 2006

Cinderford	18 - 10	Havant
	Report

Dockham Road
Attendance: 170
Referee: Eric Woodmason

21 October 2006

Clifton	40- 34	Lydney (2BP)
	Report

Station Road
Attendance: 297
Referee: Richard Parker-Sedgmore

21 October 2006

Dings Crusaders	20 - 20	Westcombe Park
	Report

Landseer Avenue
Attendance: 224
Referee: P.W Davies

21 October 2006

(BP) North Walsham	24 - 12	Hertford
	Report

Norwich Road
Referee: Steve Walters

22 October 2006

(BP) Southend	47 - 12	Canterbury
	Report

Warners Bridge Park
Attendance: 1,100
Referee: Darren Gamage

=== Round 9 ===
4 November 2006

(BP) Canterbury	39 - 19	Bridgwater & Albion
	Report

Merton Lane
Attendance: 186
Referee: Steve Walters

4 November 2006

(BP) Havant	36 - 10	Dings Crusaders
	Report

Hook's Lane
Attendance: 270
Referee: G O'Hara

4 November 2006

Hertford	8 - 20	Southend
	Report

Highfields
Attendance: 320
Referee: Simon Adams

4 November 2006

(BP) Lydney	52 - 7	Chinnor
	Report

Regentsholme
Attendance: 410
Referee: Richard Kelly

4 November 2006

(BP) Old Patesians	16 - 22	Cinderford
	Report

Everest Road
Attendance: 70
Referee: Andrew Taylorson

4 November 2006

Rosslyn Park	12 - 9	Clifton (BP)
	Report

The Rock
Attendance: 290
Referee: Paul Kimber

4 November 2006

Westcombe Park	20 - 19	North Walsham (BP)
	Report

Goddington Dene
Attendance: 250
Referee: Mark Varnon

=== Round 10 ===
11 November 2006

(BP) Bridgwater & Albion	13 - 14	Southend
	Report

Bath Road
Attendance: 650
Referee: G O'Hara

11 November 2006

Chinnor	15 - 44	Rosslyn Park (BP)
	Report

Kingsey Road
Attendance: 134
Referee: Chris Johnson

11 November 2006

Cinderford	28 - 8	Lydney
	Report

Dockham Road
Attendance: 650
Referee: Eric Woodmason

11 November 2006

Clifton	10 - 30	Canterbury (BP)
	Report

Station Road
Attendance: 70
Referee: Gareth Hodges

11 November 2006

(BP) Dings Crusaders	24 - 8	Old Patesians
	Report

Landseer Avenue
Attendance: 197
Referee: Andrew Bickle

11 November 2006

North Walsham	11 - 8	Havant (BP)
	Report

Norwich Road
Attendance: 346
Referee: Mark Liddell

11 November 2006

(BP) Westcombe Park	85 - 7	Hertford
	Report

Goddington Dene
Attendance: 150
Referee: Paul Kimber

=== Round 11 ===
25 November 2006

(BP) Canterbury	44 - 5	Chinnor
	Report

Merton Lane
Attendance: 600
Referee: G O'Hara

25 November 2006

(BP) Havant	40 - 7	Westcombe Park
	Report

Hook's Lane
Attendance: 350
Referee: Andrew Bickle

25 November 2006

Hertford	10 - 43	Bridgwater & Albion (BP)
	Report

Highfields
Attendance: 240
Referee: Eric Woodmason

25 November 2006

Lydney	22 - 12	Dings Crusaders
	Report

Regentsholme

25 November 2006

Old Patesians	11 - 22	North Walsham (BP)
	Report

Everest Road
Attendance: 80
Referee: JP Doyle

25 November 2006

Rosslyn Park	18 - 6	Cinderford
	Report

The Rock
Attendance: 220
Referee: Paul Kimber

25 November 2006

(BP) Southend	33 - 29	Clifton (2BP)
	Report

Warners Bridge Park
Attendance: 280
Referee: Steve Walters

=== Round 12 ===
2 December 2006

Chinnor	19 - 34	Southend (BP)
	Report

Kingsey Road
Attendance: 95
Referee: Ross Campbell

2 December 2006

Cinderford	17 - 35	Canterbury (BP)
	Report

Dockham Road
Attendance: 220
Referee: Gareth Hodges

2 December 2006

Clifton	7 - 32	Bridgwater & Albion (BP)
	Report

Station Road
Attendance: 253
Referee: Eric Woodmason

2 December 2006

(BP) Dings Crusaders	34 - 16	Rosslyn Park
	Report

Landseer Avenue
Attendance: 184
Referee: G O'Hara

2 December 2006

(BP) Havant	44 - 12	Hertford
	Report

Hook's Lane
Attendance: 250
Referee: Tim Miller

2 December 2006

(BP) North Walsham	17 - 18	Lydney
	Report

Norwich Road
Attendance: 325
Referee: Ed Turnill

2 December 2006

Westcombe Park	18 - 17	Old Patesians (BP)
	Report

Goddington Dene
Attendance: 200
Referee: Steve Walters

=== Round 13 ===
16 December 2006

(BP) Canterbury	43 - 0	Dings Crusaders
	Report

Merton Lane
Attendance: 198
Referee: Tim Miller

16 December 2006

(BP) Hertford	17 - 21	Clifton
	Report

Highfields
Attendance: 180
Referee: Steve Walters

16 December 2006

Lydney	23 - 19	Westcombe Park (BP)
	Report

Regentsholme
Attendance: 620
Referee: Keith Lewis

16 December 2006

(BP) Old Patesians	21 - 25	Havant (BP)
	Report

Everest Road
Attendance: 90
Referee: Michael Tutty

16 December 2006

Rosslyn Park	13 - 5	North Walsham
	Report

The Rock
Attendance: 380
Referee: Eric Woodmason

16 December 2006

(BP) Southend	31 - 16	Cinderford
	Report

Warners Bridge Park
Attendance: 375
Referee: Andrew Bickle

16 December 2006

Bridgwater & Albion	P - P	Chinnor

- Postponed. Game rescheduled to 10 March 2007.

=== Round 14 ===
23 December 2006

Dings Crusaders	11 - 11	Bridgwater & Albion
	Report

Landseer Avenue
Attendance: 230
Referee: Guy Steel Bodger

23 December 2006

(BP) Havant	29 - 5	Rosslyn Park
	Report

Hook's Lane
Attendance: 350
Referee: Andrew Bickle

23 December 2006

Hertford	16 - 13	Chinnor (BP)
	Report

Highfields
Attendance: 280
Referee: G O'Hara

23 December 2006

North Walsham	10 - 30	Southend (BP)
	Report

Norwich Road
Attendance: 502
Referee: Terry Hall

23 December 2006

Old Patesians	0 - 46	Lydney (BP)
	Report

Everest Road
Attendance: 180
Referee: Darren Gamage

23 December 2006

(BP) Westcombe Park	34 - 24	Canterbury
	Report

Goddington Dene
Attendance: 450
Referee: Steve Walters

23 December 2006

Cinderford	P - P	Clifton

- Postponed. Game rescheduled to 10 March 2007.

=== Round 15 ===
6 January 2007

(BP) Canterbury	15 - 22	Havant
	Report

Merton Lane
Attendance: 146
Referee: Mark Liddell

6 January 2007

Chinnor	3 - 24	Cinderford (BP)
	Report

Kingsey Road
Attendance: 93
Referee: Paul Kimber

6 January 2007

Clifton	16 - 7	Dings Crusaders
	Report

Station Road
Attendance: 452
Referee: Nigel Higginson

6 January 2007

Lydney	21 - 8	Hertford
	Report

Regentsholme
Attendance: 560
Referee: Ross Campbell

6 January 2007

Rosslyn Park	13 - 12	Old Patesians (BP)
	Report

The Rock
Attendance: 275
Referee: JP Doyle

6 January 2007

Southend	15 - 23	Westcombe Park
	Report

Warners Bridge Park
Attendance: 630
Referee: Alan Biggs

6 January 2007

Bridgwater & Albion	P - P	North Walsham

- Postponed. Game rescheduled to 7 April 2007.

=== Round 16 ===
13 January 2007

Dings Crusaders	19 - 18	Chinnor (BP)
	Report

Landseer Avenue
Attendance: 189
Referee: Paul Knowles

13 January 2007

Havant	20 - 34	Southend (BP)
	Report

Hook's Lane
Attendance: 320
Referee: Steve Harland

13 January 2007

(2BP) Hertford	24 - 30	Cinderford
	Report

Highfields
Attendance: 220
Referee: G O'Hara

13 January 2007

North Walsham	21 - 21	Clifton
	Report

Norwich Road
Attendance: 309
Referee: Tim Miller

13 January 2007

Old Patesians	0 - 29	Canterbury (BP)
	Report

Everest Road
Attendance: 100
Referee: Andrew Bickle

13 January 2007

(BP) Westcombe Park	33 - 14	Bridgwater & Albion
	Report

Goddington Dene
Attendance: 200
Referee: Guy Steel Bodger

13 January 2007

Lydney	P - P	Rosslyn Park

- Postponed. Game rescheduled to 10 March 2007.

=== Round 17 ===
27 January 2007

Canterbury	20 - 17	Lydney (BP)
	Report

Merton Lane
Attendance: 238
Referee: P.W Davies

27 January 2007

Chinnor	15 - 31	North Walsham (BP)
	Report

Kingsey Road
Attendance: 75
Referee: Andrew Bickle

27 January 2007

Cinderford	23 - 5	Dings Crusaders
	Report

Dockham Road

27 January 2007

(BP) Clifton	30 - 8	Westcombe Park
	Report

Station Road
Attendance: 126
Referee: Richard Kelly

27 January 2007

(BP) Rosslyn Park	34 - 8	Hertford
	Report

The Rock
Attendance: 380
Referee: Dino Maddern

27 January 2007

(BP) Southend	64 - 12	Old Patesians
	Report

Warners Bridge Park
Attendance: 180
Referee: Tim Miller

27 January 2007

Bridgwater & Albion	P - P	Havant

- Postponed. Game rescheduled to 28 April 2007.

=== Round 18 ===
3 February 2007

Havant	36 - 8	Clifton
	Report

Hook's Lane
Attendance: 250
Referee: Paul Kimber

3 February 2007

Hertford	24 - 20	Dings Crusaders (BP)
	Report

Highfields
Attendance: 290
Referee: Eric Woodmason

3 February 2007

Lydney	24 - 20	Southend (BP)
	Report

Regentsholme
Attendance: 640
Referee: Steve Harland

3 February 2007

North Walsham	13 - 12	Cinderford (BP)
	Report

Norwich Road
Attendance: 198
Referee: Guy Steel Bodger

3 February 2007

Old Patesians	8 - 29	Bridgwater & Albion (BP)
	Report

Everest Road
Attendance: 130
Referee: G O'Hara

3 February 2007

Rosslyn Park	10 - 41	Canterbury (BP)
	Report

The Rock
Attendance: 340
Referee: Luke Pearce

3 February 2007

(BP) Westcombe Park	61 - 12	Chinnor
	Report

Goddington Dene
Referee: Darren Gamage

=== Round 19 ===
17 February 2007

Bridgwater & Albion	18 - 3	Lydney
	Report

Bath Road
Attendance: 700
Referee: Chris Seeley

17 February 2007

(BP) Canterbury	38 - 5	Hertford
	Report

Merton Lane
Attendance: 283
Referee: Eric Woodmason

17 February 2007

Chinnor	5 - 18	Havant
	Report

Kingsey Road
Referee: Rob White

17 February 2007

Cinderford	8 - 26	Westcombe Park (BP)
	Report

Dockham Road
Attendance: 200
Referee: Paul Knowles

17 February 2007

(BP) Clifton	37 - 17	Old Patesians
	Report

Station Road
Attendance: 181
Referee: G O'Hara

17 February 2007

Dings Crusaders	18 - 3	North Walsham
	Report

Landseer Avenue
Attendance: 192
Referee: Tim Miller

17 February 2007

(BP) Southend	40 - 24	Rosslyn Park
	Report

Warners Bridge Park
Attendance: 360
Referee: Steve Walters

=== Round 20 ===
24 February 2007

(BP) Canterbury	44 - 17	Southend
	Report

Merton Lane
Attendance: 315
Referee: Richard Parker-Sedgmore

24 February 2007

(BP) Havant	20 - 3	Cinderford
	Report

Hook's Lane
Attendance: 250
Referee: Philip Davis

24 February 2007

(BP) Hertford	36 - 17	North Walsham
	Report

Highfields
Attendance: 335
Referee: Darren Gamage

24 February 2007

(BP) Lydney	53 - 3	Clifton
	Report

Regentsholme
Attendance: 565
Referee: Andrew Bickle

24 February 2007

(BP) Old Patesians	32 - 10	Chinnor
	Report

Everest Road
Attendance: 60
Referee: Steve Harland

24 February 2007

Rosslyn Park	28 - 17	Bridgwater & Albion
	Report

The Rock
Attendance: 310
Referee: Mark Liddell

24 February 2007

(BP) Westcombe Park	56 - 17	Dings Crusaders
	Report

Goddington Dene
Attendance: 150
Referee: Paul Kimber

=== Round 21 ===
3 March 2007

(BP) Bridgwater & Albion	37 - 17	Canterbury
	Report

Bath Road
Attendance: 700
Referee: Richard Kelly

3 March 2007

(BP) Cinderford	32 - 17	Old Patesians
	Report

Dockham Road
Attendance: 200
Referee: Mark Varnon

3 March 2007

(BP) Clifton	13 - 15	Rosslyn Park
	Report

Station Road
Attendance: 193
Referee: Nigel Higginson

3 March 2007

(2BP) Dings Crusaders	25 - 31	Havant (BP)
	Report

Landseer Avenue
Attendance: 203
Referee: Steve Walters

3 March 2007

North Walsham	5 - 41	Westcombe Park (BP)
	Report

Norwich Road
Referee: Guy Steel Bodger

3 March 2007

(BP) Southend	55 - 29	Hertford (BP)
	Report

Warners Bridge Park
Attendance: 360
Referee: David Sainsbury

3 March 2007

Chinnor	P - P	Lydney

- Postponed. Game rescheduled to 7 April 2007.

=== Rounds 13, 14 & 16 (rescheduled games) ===
10 March 2007

(BP) Bridgwater & Albion	34 - 10	Chinnor
	Report

Bath Road
Attendance: 450
Referee: G O'Hara

- Game rescheduled from 16 December 2006.

10 March 2007

Cinderford	19 - 8	Clifton
	Report

Dockham Road
Referee: Steve Harland

- Game rescheduled from 23 December 2006.

10 March 2007

Lydney	22 - 18	Rosslyn Park (BP)
	Report

Regentsholme
Attendance: 595
Referee: Paul Kimber

- Game rescheduled from 13 January 2007.

=== Round 22 ===
17 March 2007

(BP) Canterbury	36 - 52	Clifton (BP)
	Report

Merton Lane
Attendance: 240
Referee: David Sainsbury

17 March 2007

(BP) Havant	61 - 15	North Walsham
	Report

Hook's Lane
Attendance: 300
Referee: Philip Davis

17 March 2007

Hertford	13 - 47	Westcombe Park (BP)
	Report

Highfields
Attendance: 320
Referee: Paul Kimber

17 March 2007

Lydney	22 - 13	Cinderford
	Report

Regentsholme
Attendance: 1,120
Referee: Darren Gamage

17 March 2007

Old Patesians	12 - 22	Dings Crusaders
	Report

Everest Road
Attendance: 80
Referee: Richard Draper

17 March 2007

(BP) Rosslyn Park	12 - 13	Chinnor
	Report

The Rock
Referee: Tim Miller

17 March 2007

(BP) Southend	32 - 26	Bridgwater & Albion (2BP)
	Report

Warners Bridge Park
Attendance: 400
Referee: Terry Hall

=== Round 23 ===
24 March 2007

(BP) Bridgwater & Albion	30 - 21	Hertford
	Report

Bath Road
Attendance: 740
Referee: Andrew Bickle

24 March 2007

Chinnor	8 - 43	Canterbury (BP)
	Report

Kingsey Road
Attendance: 110
Referee: Mark Liddell

24 March 2007

(BP) Cinderford	47 - 20	Rosslyn Park
	Report

Dockham Road
Attendance: 120
Referee: G O'Hara

24 March 2007

Clifton	22 - 41	Southend (BP)
	Report

Station Road
Attendance: 171
Referee: Steve Walters

24 March 2007

Dings Crusaders	22 - 15	Lydney (BP)
	Report

Landseer Avenue
Attendance: 276
Referee: David Sainsbury

24 March 2007

North Walsham	12 - 5	Old Patesians (BP)
	Report

Norwich Road
Attendance: 209
Referee: Tim Miller

24 March 2007

(BP) Westcombe Park	30 - 8	Havant
	Report

Goddington Dene
Attendance: 200
Referee: Mark Varnon

=== Round 24 ===
31 March 2007

(BP) Bridgwater & Albion	43 - 10	Clifton
	Report

Bath Road
Attendance: 740
Referee: Mark Varnon

31 March 2007

(BP) Canterbury	32 - 9	Cinderford
	Report

Merton Lane
Attendance: 182
Referee: Guy Steel Bodger

31 March 2007

(BP) Hertford	12 - 19	Havant
	Report

Highfields
Attendance: 415
Referee: Steve Walters

31 March 2007

(2BP) Lydney	29 - 34	North Walsham (BP)
	Report

Regentsholme
Attendance: 585
Referee: Andrew Bickle

31 March 2007

Old Patesians	17 - 48	Westcombe Park (BP)
	Report

Everest Road
Attendance: 88
Referee: Philip Davis

31 March 2007

Rosslyn Park	30 - 3	Dings Crusaders
	Report

The Rock
Attendance: 239
Referee: Richard Phillips

31 March 2007

(BP) Southend	49 - 5	Chinnor
	Report

Warners Bridge Park
Attendance: 350
Referee: Paul Kimber

=== Rounds 15 & 21 (rescheduled games) ===
7 April 2007

(BP) Bridgwater & Albion	33 - 14	North Walsham
	Report

Bath Road
Referee: Philip Davis

- Game rescheduled from 6 January 2007.

7 April 2007

Chinnor	25 - 14	Lydney
	Report

Kingsey Road
Attendance: 75
Referee: Tim Miller

- Game rescheduled from 3 March 2007.

=== Round 25 ===
14 April 2007

(BP) Chinnor	24 - 53	Bridgwater & Albion (BP)
	Report

Kingsey Road
Attendance: 125

14 April 2007

(2BP) Cinderford	26 - 27	Southend
	Report

Dockham Road

14 April 2007

Clifton	18 - 0	Hertford
	Report

Station Road
Attendance: 317
Referee: Keith Lewis

14 April 2007

(BP) Dings Crusaders	26 - 16	Canterbury
	Report

Landseer Avenue
Attendance: 154
Referee: Ian Robinson

14 April 2007

(BP) Havant	58 - 29	Old Patesians (BP)
	Report

Hook's Lane
Attendance: 307
Referee: Ross Campbell

14 April 2007

(BP) North Walsham	49 - 31	Rosslyn Park (BP)
	Report

Norwich Road
Attendance: 387
Referee: Mark Liddell

14 April 2007

(BP) Westcombe Park	53 - 12	Lydney
	Report

Goddington Dene
Attendance: 300
Referee: Rowan Kitt

=== Round 26 ===
21 April 2007

(BP) Bridgwater & Albion	17 - 22	Cinderford
	Report

Bath Road
Attendance: 550

21 April 2007

(BP) Canterbury	53 - 7	North Walsham
	Report

Merton Lane
Attendance: 326
Referee: Paul Knowles

21 April 2007

(BP) Clifton	72 - 17	Chinnor
	Report

Station Road
Attendance: 217
Referee: Terry Hall

21 April 2007

Lydney	25 - 7	Havant
	Report

Regentsholme
Attendance: 590
Referee: Steve Harland

21 April 2007

Old Patesians	22 - 39	Hertford (BP)
	Report

Everest Road
Attendance: 50
Referee: Nigel Higginson

21 April 2007

Rosslyn Park	8 - 22	Westcombe Park
	Report

The Rock
Attendance: 480
Referee: Chris Seeley

21 April 2007

(BP) Southend	76 - 15	Dings Crusaders
	Report

Warners Bridge Park
Attendance: 770
Referee: Richard Phillips

=== Round 17 (rescheduled game) ===
28 April 2007

(BP) Bridgwater & Albion	28 - 17	Havant
	Report

Bath Road
Attendance: 630
Referee: Andrew Bickle

- Game rescheduled from 27 January 2007.

=== Promotion play-off ===
The league runners up of National Division Three South and North would meet in a playoff game for promotion to National Division Two. Westcombe Park were the southern division runners up and as they had a superior league record than northern runners-up, Tynedale, they hosted the play-off match.

28 May 2007
15:00

Westcombe Park	36 - 20	Tynedale

Goddington Dene

== Total season attendances ==
Club	Home Games	Total	Average	Highest	Lowest	% Capacity
Bridgwater & Albion	12 (Note: Missing home attendance v North Walsham on 7 April 2007.)	7,780	648	740	450	13%
Canterbury	13	3,400	262	600	146	17%
Chinnor	11 (Note: Missing home attendances v Dings Crusaders on 23 September 2006 and Havant on 17 February 2007.)	1,504	137	250	75	7%
Cinderford	9 (Note: Missing home attendances v Bridgwater & Albion on 2 September 2006, Dings Crusaders on 27 January 2007, Clifton on 10 March 2007 and Southend on 14 April 2007.)	2,220	247	650	120	10%
Clifton	11 (Note: Missing home attendances v Cinderford on 9 September 2006 and Havant on 7 October 2006.)	2,357	214	452	70	10%
Dings Crusaders	12 (Note: Missing home attendance v Southend on 2 September 2006.)	2,430	203	276	90	14%
Havant	11 (Note: Missing home attendances v Lydney on 2 September 2006 and Canterbury on 16 September 2006.)	3,420	311	390	250	16%
Hertford	13	3,570	298	470	180	
Lydney	11 (Note: Missing home attendances v Canterbury on 30 September 2006 and Dings Crusaders on 25 November 2006.)	6,960	633	1,120	410	21%
North Walsham	10 (Note: Missing home attendances v Chinnor on 30 September 2006, Hertford on 21 October 2006 and Westcombe Park on 3 March 2007.)	3,406	341	502	198	28%
Old Patesians	13	1,246	96	180	50	
Rosslyn Park	12 (Note: Missing home attendance v Chinnor on 17 March 2007.)	3,964	330	480	220	17%
Southend	12 (Note: Missing home attendance v Havant on 23 September 2006.)	5,070	423	1,100	106	28%
Westcombe Park	11 (Note: Missing home attendances v Rosslyn Park on 2 September 2006 and Chinnor on 3 February 2007.)	2,700	245	450	150	8%

== Individual statistics ==
- Note that points scorers includes tries as well as conversions, penalties and drop goals.

=== Top points scorers ===
Rank	Player	Team	Appearances	Points
1	(England) Andy Frost	Southend	26	335
2	(England) James Whittingham	Westcombe Park	21	238
3	(England) John Barnes	Clifton	22	210
4	(England) Richard Mahoney	Rosslyn Park	24	201
5	(England) Rory Teague	Lydney	15	166
6	(Samoa) Faapoloo Soolefai	Southend	26	160
7	(Samoa) Ngapaku Ngapaku	Havant	24	155
8	(Australia) Christian Wulff	Bridgwater & Albion	26	136
9	(England) Adam Westall	Lydney	25	134
10	(New Zealand) Marshall Milroy	Bridgwater & Albion	13	125

=== Top try scorers ===
Rank	Player	Team	Appearances	Tries
1	(Samoa) Faapoloo Soolefai	Southend	26	32
2	(Wales) Sam Greenaway	Westcombe Park	23	22
3	(England) Andy Thorpe	North Walsham	19	20
3	(South Africa) Gert De Kock	Canterbury	26	20
4	(England) Tom Hayman	Westcombe Park	24	19
5	(England) Chris Green	Southend	26	17
6	(New Zealand) Cam Avery	Havant	20	16
6	(England) Michael Melford	Canterbury	26	16
6	(England) Andy Pratt	Canterbury	26	16
7	(England) Rob Viol	Clifton	20	15

== Season records ==
=== Team ===
Largest home win — 78 pts

85 - 7 Westcombe Park at home to Hertford on 11 November 2006

Largest away win — 77 pts

85 - 8 Westcombe Park away to Chinnor on 7 October 2006

Most points scored — 85 pts (x2)

85 - 8 Westcombe Park away to Chinnor on 7 October 2006
85 - 7 Westcombe Park at home to Hertford on 11 November 2006

Most tries in a match — 13

Westcombe Park at home to Hertford on 11 November 2006

Most conversions in a match — 11

Westcombe Park away to Chinnor on 7 October 2006

Most penalties in a match — 7 (x2)

Hertford at home to Rosslyn Park on 30 September 2006
Clifton at home to Lydney on 21 October 2006

Most drop goals in a match — 1

N/A - multiple teams

=== Player ===
Most points in a match — 30

(England) Andy Thorpe for North Walsham at home to Rosslyn Park on 14 April 2007

Most tries in a match — 6

(England) Andy Thorpe for North Walsham at home to Rosslyn Park on 14 April 2007

Most conversions in a match — 11

(England) James Whittingham for Westcombe Park away to Chinnor on 7 October 2006

Most penalties in a match — 7 (x2)

(England) Kieron Davies for Hertford at home to Rosslyn Park on 30 September 2006
(England) John Barnes for Clifton at home to Lydney on 21 October 2006

Most drop goals in a match — 1

N/A - multiple players

=== Attendances ===
Highest — 1,120

Lydney at home to Cinderford on 17 March 2007

Lowest — 50

Old Patesians at home to Hertford on 21 April 2007

Highest Average Attendance — 648

Bridgwater & Albion

Lowest Average Attendance — 96

Old Patesians

== See also ==
- English rugby union system
- Rugby union in England
