= Rod Petty =

Australian rugby union player

Rod Petty is a former Australian professional rugby union player. A scrum half, he is currently a player-coach for Birmingham and Solihull R.F.C. in English National Division 2 North.

== Career ==
A Wallabies cap at U19 and U21 level, Petty also represented the Australian Sevens side until 2006. He was named the New South Wales Rugby Union's Will Tanner Country Player of the Year 1999 and was described as "particularly impressive" against the British and Irish Lions in a 2001 tour match. In addition to this he played twice in tour matches against Scotland, and was selected for the 2006 Commonwealth Games with the national Sevens side.

Petty moved from the Northern Suburbs Rugby Club to join Birmingham and Solihull R.F.C. (then Pertemps Bees) in 2006. He played for the club between 2006 and 2011 and made over 100 appearances, but spent the 2007–08 season at Stourbridge R.F.C. because of immigration problems caused by a change in the Rugby Football Union's regulations. During the 2008–9 season Petty scored an impressive 16 tries in all competitions and was named Clubman of the Year at the end of the 2010-11 campaign. Petty has also made a number of appearances for Gloucester "A". In 2011, he became player-coach at Bournville.

In the summer of 2013 Petty rejoined Birmingham and Solihull R.F.C. as a player-coach.
