= Cambridge Road (disambiguation) =

Cambridge Road is a road running from London to King's Lynn, England, as part of the A10 road.

Cambridge Road may also refer to:

- Cambridge Road, Hong Kong, which intersects Lancashire Road
- Cambridge Road, Ypres a sector of the Ypres Salient between Wieltje and Hooge
