= Cambridge R.U.F.C. =

English rugby union club, based in Cambridgeshire

(England) Cambridge
- Full name: Cambridge Rugby Union Football Club
- Union: Eastern Counties RFU
- Founded: 1923; 103 years ago
- Location: Cambridge, Cambridgeshire, England
- Ground: Grantchester Road (Capacity: 2,200 (200 seats))
- League: Champ Rugby
- 2025–26: 14th (relegation to National League 1)
| 1st kit | 2nd kit |

Official website
- cambridgerugby.co.uk

Cambridge Rugby Union Football Club or CRUFC ('The Blood & Sand') is an English rugby union club representing the city of Cambridge. Formed in 1923, the club competes in the third tier of the English rugby union system, National League 1, following relegation from Champ Rugby in 2025–26. The club plays its home matches at the 2.200 capacity Grantchester Road ground, in the suburb of Newnham, approximately two kilometres south-west of the city centre. The club runs three senior squads: the national league squad, a development squad, and a social squad. At junior level the club runs one of the oldest mini and youth rugby sections in the country, starting back in the early 1970s, with a colts team for under-18s.

== History ==
Cambridge RUFC was formed in 1923 and was settled in its current ground by the 1950s. In 1993 the club was offered the opportunity to buy the lease on its existing three pitches and to buy adjoining land for a further three pitches from King's College. Floodlights were added to one of these pitches in 2003 so that evening games might be played and the light available for training was improved.

Cambridge RUFC joined the newly formed league structure in 1988 and by 1991 was playing in London 3 North East. After five years in this division, the club was promoted to London 2 North and after four years in this division, was promoted at the end of the 1998–99 season to London 1, which feeds into the National Leagues. In the club's first season in London 1, they achieved 4th place, plus a run to the semi-final of the NPI Cup, falling just one match from Twickenham, after defeat away at Hull by 21–17. London 1 status was secured again for the 2001–02 Season, but the squad led to relegation at the end of that season. However, by the end of the 2003–04 season, a rebuilt side regained promotion to London 1. Cambridge also won the Eastern Counties Cup for the first time and regained the Cambridgeshire Cup from perennial rivals Shelford. This time, the stay in London 1 was to be even shorter; At the end of an exciting season the League championship lay between Worthing and Cambridge at the start of the final round of matches: Worthing at home to Canterbury and Cambridge at home to Basingstoke. The championship would go to the team achieving the greatest points difference. In the event, Cambridge won by 96–15 and Worthing were condemned to the play-offs. Cambridge went on to beat Norwich in the Eastern Counties Cup Final and Shelford in the Cambridgeshire Cup Final — the second successive treble, and promotion to National League rugby for the first time.

In the 2005–06 season Cambridge once again secured promotion after a two horse race. This time with Norfolk & East Anglian Giants North Walsham who had been present in this league for well over a decade. Cambridge squeezed past them with a last day win at Reading while North Walsham failed by 21–20 at Southend. This was all the more lucky as North Walsham had secured the bonus point for four tries but failed with all four conversions. In the 2006–07 season Cambridge managed to consolidate their position in National Division Two with a 9th-place finish. In the 2008–09 season Cambridge finished second in the league and would have been promoted had it not been for the re-organisation of the leagues in mid season.

== League history ==
=== Overall ===
| Year | League | Position | Notes |
|---|---|---|---|
| 1987–88 | No league | | |
| 1988–89 | Eastern Counties Division 1 | | |
| 1989–90 | London Division 4 North-East | | |
| 1990–91 | London Division 3 North-East | | |
| 1991–92 | London Division 3 North-East | 1st | |
| 1992–93 | London Division 3 North-East | | |
| 1993–94 | London Division 3 North-East | | |
| 1994–95 | London Division 3 North-East | | |
| 1995–96 | London Division 2 North | | |
| 1996–97 | London Division 2 North | 4th | |
| 1997–98 | London Division 2 North | 3rd | |
| 1998–99 | London Division 2 North | 1st | Promoted to London Division One |
| 1999–2000 | London Division 1 | 4th | NPI Cup semi-final |
| 2000–01 | London Division 1 | 8th | |
| 2001–02 | London Division 1 | 12th | relegated |
| 2002–03 | London Division 2 North | 4th | |
| 2003–04 | London Division 2 North | 2nd | Promoted via play-off; Eastern Counties & Cambridgeshire Cup champions |
| 2004–05 | London Division 1 | 1st | Promoted; Eastern Counties & Cambridgeshire Cup champions |
| 2005–06 | National Division 3 South | 1st | Promoted; Eastern Counties & Cambridgeshire Cup champions |
| 2006–07 | National Division 2 | 9th | 5th round in Powergen National Trophy |
| 2007–08 | National Division 2 | 5th | |
| 2008–09 | National Division 2 | 2nd | Would have been promoted but for the RFU league structure changes |
| 2009–10 | National League 1 | 4th | League renamed |
| 2010–11 | National League 1 | 3rd | |
| 2011–12 | National League 1 | 12th | |
| 2012–13 | National League 1 | 16th | Relegated |
| 2013–14 | National League 2 South | 7th | |
| 2014–15 | National League 2 South | 6th | |
| 2015–16 | National League 2 South | 1st | Promoted to National League 1 |
| 2016–17 | National League 1 | 14th | |
| 2017–18 | National League 1 | 10th | |
| 2018–19 | National League 1 | 13th | |
| 2020–21 | National League 1 | 9th | |
| 2021–21 | National League 1 | N/A | League games cancelled due to the coronavirus pandemic |
| 2021–22 | National League 1 | 4th | |
| 2022–23 | National League 1 | 1st | Promoted |
| 2023–24 | RFU Championship | 11th | No relegation |
| 2024–25 | RFU Championship | 12th | No relegation |
| 2025–26 | Champ Rugby | 14th | Relegated |

== Players ==
A number of players have gone on to gain International rugby honours, including Dickie Jeeps (England and British Lions), Andy Hancock (England), Bob Steven (Scotland), Trefor Evans (Wales), Simon Culhane (New Zealand), including appearances in the 1995 World Cup Finals, and Alex Goode (England). Many more have earned age grade or England Counties caps. In 2014 Martin Wolfenden represented Zimbabwe in the qualifying competition for the Rugby World Cup.

The club's most capped player is the late Shaun Gadsby who made 505 appearances for the club, his last being in the 2003/04 season aged 40.

== Honours ==
=== Senior team ===
- London 3 North East: champions: 1991–92
- London Division Two North: 1998–99
- Eastern Counties Cup (3): 2003–04, 2004–05, 2005–06
- Cambridgeshire Cup (3): 2003–04, 2004–05, 2005–06
- London 2 (north v south) promotion play-off winner: 2003–04
- London Division One: 2004–05
- National League 2 South (2): 2005–06, 2015–16
- National League 1: champions 2022–23

=== Youth teams ===
- Eastern Counties U-17s Cup (3): 1992, 2002, 2006
- Eastern Counties U-19s Cup (3): 1994, 2003, 2004
- National U-19 Plate (1): 2002

== Current standings ==
2026–27 National League 1 table
| Pos | Team | Pld | W | D | L | PF | PA | PD | TB | LB | Pts | Qualification |
|---|---|---|---|---|---|---|---|---|---|---|---|---|
| 1 | Plymouth Albion | 8 | 8 | 0 | 0 | 436 | 130 | +306 | 8 | 0 | 40 | Promotion place |
| 2 | Tonbridge Juddians | 8 | 7 | 0 | 1 | 327 | 289 | +38 | 8 | 0 | 36 | Promotion play-off |
| 3 | Camborne | 8 | 7 | 0 | 1 | 312 | 237 | +75 | 7 | 0 | 35 | Promotion play-off |
| 4 | Leeds Tykes | 8 | 5 | 0 | 3 | 291 | 220 | +71 | 6 | 3 | 29 | |
| 5 | Sale FC | 8 | 5 | 0 | 3 | 330 | 224 | +106 | 6 | 2 | 28 | |
| 6 | Rosslyn Park | 8 | 4 | 0 | 4 | 277 | 266 | +11 | 7 | 1 | 24 | |
| 7 | London Scottish | 8 | 4 | 0 | 4 | 290 | 299 | −9 | 6 | 1 | 23 | |
| 8 | Birmingham Moseley | 8 | 4 | 0 | 4 | 230 | 279 | −49 | 6 | 1 | 23 | |
| 9 | Bishop's Stortford | 8 | 3 | 0 | 5 | 287 | 296 | −9 | 7 | 2 | 21 | |
| 10 | Rams | 8 | 2 | 1 | 5 | 208 | 269 | −61 | 6 | 2 | 18 | |
| 11 | Bury St Edmunds | 8 | 3 | 0 | 5 | 210 | 313 | −103 | 5 | 0 | 17 | Relegation play-off |
| 12 | Dings Crusaders | 8 | 1 | 1 | 6 | 288 | 355 | −67 | 7 | 3 | 16 | Relegation place |
| 13 | Sheffield | 8 | 2 | 0 | 6 | 190 | 291 | −101 | 5 | 2 | 15 | Relegation place |
| 14 | Cambridge | 8 | 0 | 0 | 8 | 219 | 427 | −208 | 5 | 3 | 8 | Relegation place |

Updated to match(es) played on 31 October 2026. Source: National League Rugby
Rules for classification: If teams are level at any stage, tiebreakers are applied in the following order:
1. Number of matches won
2. Number of matches drawn
3. Difference between points for and against
4. Total number of points for
5. Aggregate number of points scored in matches between tied teams
6. Number of matches won excluding the first match, then the second and so on until the tie is settled

== Current squad ==
The Cambridge squad for the 26/27 National 1 Rugby Season is:

Cambridge 2025–26 Champ Rugby squad
| **Props**: (England) Jake Barry; (England) Jack Boal; (England) Harry Bellamy; (England) Jake Bridges; (England) Sam Buckley; (England) Jake Ellwood; (England) Tubuna Maka (Note: Leicester Tigers players who are dual-registered with the club for the 2025-26 season.); (Samoa) Paul Masoe; (England) Zac Nearchou; (South Africa) Francois Roussouw; (England) Ben Shamley; (England) Billy Walker; **Hookers**: (England) Jack Doorey-Palmer (Note: Jack Doorey-Palmer is on a season-long loan from Harlequins for the 2025-26 season.); (New Zealand) Dylan Irvine; (England) Joe Plunkett; (England) John Stewart (Note: Leicester Tigers players who are dual-registered with the club for the 2025-26 season.); **Locks**: (England) Gareth Baxter; (England) Charlie Friend; (South Africa) Rhys Fulford; (England) Jack Lawrence (Note: Northampton Saints players who are dual-registered with the club for the 2025-26 season.); (Ireland) Jake McCay; (Wales) Arthur Thomas | **Back row**: (Australia) Ben Adams; (Samoa) Sam Asotasi; (England) Dan Eckersley; (New Zealand) Sam Johnson; (England) Monty Loggenberg; (England) Chris Mills; (England) Ardal Yallop; **Scrum-halves**: (England) Ollie Allan (Note: Leicester Tigers players who are dual-registered with the club for the 2025-26 season.); (England) Charlie Bemand (Note: Leicester Tigers players who are dual-registered with the club for the 2025-26 season.); (England) Ruaridh Dawson; (England) Jimmy Thompson; (England) Pete White; **Fly-halves**: (Scotland) Jamie Annand; (England) Tom Threlfall; (Tonga) **Otumaka Mausia**; (England) Jake Vernum | **Centres**: (England) Henry Lumley (Note: Northampton Saints players who are dual-registered with the club for the 2025-26 season.); (New Zealand) Levi Reweti; (Fiji) Epi Rokodrava; (England) Jasper Sorrell; **Wings**: (England) Eli Caven; (England) Will Glister (Note: Northampton Saints players who are dual-registered with the club for the 2025-26 season.); (England) Joe Green; (Fiji) Taitusi Qaniuci; (England) Ethan Thorne; (England) Kesena Izu; (Fiji) Vereimi Qorowale; **Fullbacks**: (England) Charlie Robson; (England) James Pater (Note: Northampton Saints players who are dual-registered with the club for the 2025-26 season.); (South Africa) Ben Currie; (England) George Pearson |
**(c)** denotes the team captain. (vc) denotes vice-captain. **Bold** denotes internationally capped players.^{ST} denotes a short-term signing. Source:
