= Grantchester Road =

Rugby stadium in Cambridge, England

Coordinates: 52°11′40″N 0°05′53″E

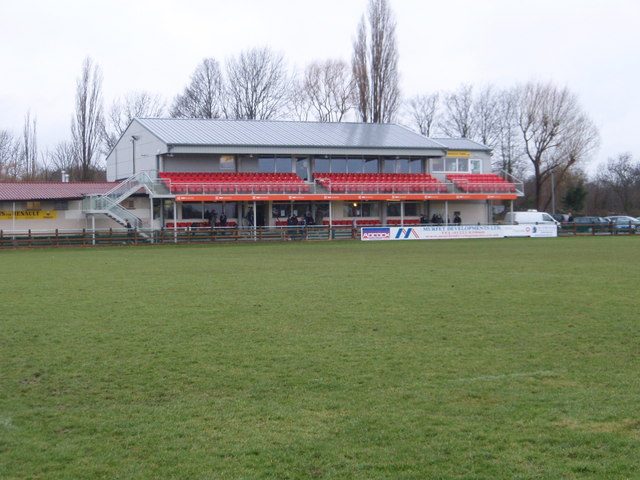
Pavilion at West Renault Park

Grantchester Road is a rugby stadium in Cambridge, England. Situated on Grantchester Road, off Barton Road in the southwest of Cambridge, it is the home ground of Cambridge R.U.F.C., and is also used by University of Cambridge Rugby League Club.

The stadium was built around 1949 and holds around 2,200 spectators including 200 seated in the clubhouse grandstand. Currently named Volac Park, as part of a sponsorship deal, it has also been known as Wests Renault Park.

The ground has been improved as the club has risen up the leagues, adding drainage systems to all six pitches, match standard floodlighting to 1½ pitches. The main upstairs extension was finished in December 2005.
