= 2012–13 National League 1 =

Rugby union competition in England

- Countries: England
- Champions: Ealing Trailfinders
- Runners-up: Esher
- Relegated: Macclesfield, Sedgley Park, Cambridge
- Matches played: 238
- Attendance: 119,493 (average 502 per match)
- Highest attendance: 1,437 Richmond at home to Rosslyn Park on 27 October 2012
- Lowest attendance: 106 Sedgley Park at home to Loughborough Students on 4 May 2013
- Top point scorer: (England) Stuart Hall; Loughborough Students 319 points
- Top try scorer: (England) Phil Chesters; Ealing Trailfinders 29 tries

The 2012–13 National League 1 was the fourth season of the third tier of the English domestic rugby union competitions since the professionalised format of the second division was introduced. New teams to the division included Esher who were relegated from the 2011–12 RFU Championship, Loughborough Students who were promoted as champions from the 2011–12 National League 2 North along with Old Albanian (champions) and Richmond (playoffs) who came up from the 2011–12 National League 2 South.

Ealing Trailfinders finished in first place and, as champions, were promoted to the 2013–14 RFU Championship for next season. Macclesfield, Sedgley Park and Cambridge were relegated to the fourth tier, the first two named, to the 2013–14 National League 2 North and Cambridge to the 2013–14 National League 2 South.

== Participating teams and locations ==
Locations of the 2012-13 National League 1 teams
Greater London National League 1 clubs

| Team | Stadium | Capacity | City/Area |
|---|---|---|---|
| Blackheath | Rectory Field | 3,500 (500 seats) | Blackheath, London |
| Blaydon | Crow Trees | 2,000 (400 seats) | Swalwell, Tyne and Wear |
| Cambridge | Grantchester Road | 2,200 (200 seats) | Cambridge |
| Cinderford | Dockham Road | 2,500 | Cinderford, Gloucestershire |
| Coventry | Butts Park Arena | 4,000 (3,000 seats) | Coventry |
| Ealing Trailfinders | Trailfinders Sports Ground | 3,020 | West Ealing, London |
| Esher | Molesey Road | 3,000 (1,200 seats) | Hersham, Surrey |
| Fylde | Woodlands Memorial Ground | 7,500 (500 seats) | Lytham St. Annes, Lancashire |
| Loughborough Students | Loughborough University Stadium | 3,000 | Loughborough, Leicestershire |
| Macclesfield | Priory Park | 1,250 (250 seats) | Macclesfield, Cheshire |
| Old Albanian | Woollam Playing Fields | 1,000 | St Albans, Hertfordshire |
| Richmond | Athletic Ground | 4,500 (1,000 seats) | Richmond, London |
| Rosslyn Park | The Rock | 2,000 (630 seats) | Roehampton, London |
| Sedgley Park | Park Lane | 3,000 | Whitefield, Greater Manchester |
| Tynedale | Tynedale Park | 2,000 (400 seats) | Corbridge, Northumberland |
| Wharfedale | The Avenue | 2,000 | Threshfield, Craven, North Yorkshire |

== League table ==
2012–13 National League 1 table
| Pos | Team | Pld | W | D | L | PF | PA | PD | TB | LB | Pts | Qualification |
|---|---|---|---|---|---|---|---|---|---|---|---|---|
| 1 | Ealing Trailfinders (C) | 30 | 25 | 2 | 3 | 1069 | 612 | +457 | 21 | 3 | 128 | Promoted |
| 2 | Esher | 30 | 21 | 0 | 9 | 972 | 697 | +275 | 19 | 6 | 109 | |
| 3 | Blaydon | 30 | 19 | 1 | 10 | 829 | 671 | +158 | 18 | 7 | 103 | |
| 4 | Rosslyn Park | 30 | 19 | 2 | 9 | 974 | 636 | +338 | 15 | 5 | 100 | |
| 5 | Old Albanians | 29 | 18 | 1 | 10 | 844 | 735 | +109 | 18 | 3 | 95 | |
| 6 | Fylde | 30 | 17 | 1 | 12 | 807 | 745 | +62 | 16 | 6 | 92 | |
| 7 | Loughborough Students | 30 | 15 | 1 | 14 | 856 | 877 | −21 | 13 | 3 | 78 | |
| 8 | Richmond | 30 | 13 | 4 | 13 | 730 | 732 | −2 | 10 | 6 | 76 | |
| 9 | Coventry | 29 | 13 | 1 | 15 | 716 | 616 | +100 | 11 | 7 | 72 | |
| 10 | Blackheath | 30 | 13 | 0 | 17 | 792 | 769 | +23 | 9 | 9 | 70 | |
| 11 | Cinderford | 29 | 11 | 2 | 16 | 794 | 818 | −24 | 15 | 7 | 70 | |
| 12 | Tynedale | 30 | 11 | 0 | 19 | 799 | 806 | −7 | 13 | 12 | 69 | |
| 13 | Wharfedale | 29 | 11 | 1 | 17 | 655 | 769 | −114 | 8 | 8 | 62 | |
| 14 | Macclesfield (R) | 30 | 12 | 2 | 16 | 585 | 840 | −255 | 8 | 4 | 59 (Note: 5 points deducted) | Relegated |
| 15 | Sedgley Park (R) | 30 | 7 | 0 | 23 | 558 | 1083 | −525 | 8 | 4 | 40 | Relegated |
| 16 | Cambridge (R) | 30 | 4 | 0 | 26 | 593 | 1167 | −574 | 8 | 4 | 28 | Relegated |

Updated to match(es) played on 4 May 2013. Source: statbunker.com
Rules for classification: If teams are level at any stage, tiebreakers are applied in the following order:
1. Number of matches won
2. Difference between points for and against
3. Total number of points for
4. Aggregate number of points scored in matches between tied teams
5. Number of matches won excluding the first match, then the second and so on until the tie is settled
  (C) Champion; (R) Relegated
  Notes:

== Results ==
=== Round 1 ===
1 September 2012
14:00

| Loughborough Students | 20-57 | Blackheath |
| | Report |

Ashby Road
Attendance: 243
Referee: Andrew Jackson

1 September 2012
14:30

| Rosslyn Park | 20-14 | Sedgley Park |
| | Report |

The Rock
Attendance: 780
Referee: Simon Harding

1 September 2012
15:00

| Cambridge | 25-30 | Cinderford |
| | Report |

Grantchester Road
Attendance: 545
Referee: Richard Kelly

1 September 2012
15:00

| Coventry | 13-37 | Ealing Trailfinders |
| | Report |

Butts Park Arena
Attendance: 1,026
Referee: Tom Davis

1 September 2012
15:00

| Fylde | 39-22 | Esher |
| | Report |

Woodlands
Attendance: 726
Referee: Michael Tutty

1 September 2012
15:00

| Macclesfield | 19-43 | Blaydon |
| | Report |

Priory Park
Attendance: 357
Referee: Philip Davis

1 September 2012
15:00

| Richmond | 34-24 | Wharfedale |
| | Report |

Richmond Athletic Ground
Attendance: 765
Referee: Terry Hall

1 September 2012
15:00

| Tynedale | 38-22 | Old Albanian |
| | Report Report |

Tynedale Park
Attendance: 410

=== Round 2 ===
8 September 2012
14:30

| Blaydon | 15-10 | Tynedale |
| | Report |

Crow Trees
Attendance: 711
Referee: John Meredith

8 September 2012
14:30

| Cinderford | 36-31 | Coventry |
| | Report |

Recreation Ground
Attendance: 470
Referee: Shane Lewis

8 September 2012
14:30

| Sedgley Park | 39-17 | Macclesfield |
| | Report |

Park Lane
Attendance: 427
Referee: Marcus Caton

8 September 2012
15:00

| Cambridge | 25-18 | Loughborough Students |
| | Report |

Grantchester Road
Attendance: 356
Referee: Nick Cockburn

8 September 2012
15:00

| Ealing Trailfinders | 29-22 | Rosslyn Park |
| | Report |

Trailfinders Ground
Attendance: 843
Referee: Philip Davis

8 September 2012
15:00

| Esher | 33-28 | Blackheath |
| | Report |

Molesey Road
Attendance: 850
Referee: Andrew Taylorson

8 September 2012
15:00

| Old Albanian | 32-25 | Richmond |
| | Report |

Woolams
Attendance: 340
Referee: Karl Kirkpatrick

8 September 2012
15:00

| Wharfedale | 21-17 | Fylde |
| | Report |

The Avenue
Attendance: 649
Referee: Wayne Falla

=== Round 3 ===
15 September 2012
14:30

| Loughborough Students | 22-37 | Esher |
| | Report |

Ashby Road
Attendance: 320
Referee: Tom Davis

15 September 2012
14:30

| Richmond | 24-20 | Blaydon |
| | Report |

Richmond Athletic Ground
Attendance: 417
Referee: Michael Tutty

15 September 2012
14:30

| Rosslyn Park | 36-36 | Cinderford |
| | Report |

The Rock
Attendance: 340
Referee: Terry Hall

15 September 2012
15:00

| Blackheath | 26-20 | Wharfedale |
| | Report |

Rectory Field
Attendance: 779
Referee: Nick Cockburn

15 September 2012
15:00

| Coventry | 37-5 | Cambridge |
| | Report |

Butts Park Arena
Attendance: 720
Referee: Tom Foley

15 September 2012
15:00

| Fylde | 20-26 | Old Albanian |
| | Report |

Woodlands
Attendance: 580
Referee: John Meredith

15 September 2012
15:00

| Macclesfield | 15-56 | Ealing Trailfinders |
| | Report |

Priory Park
Attendance: 325
Referee: Rob Debney

15 September 2012
15:00

| Tynedale | 30-10 | Sedgley Park |
| | Report |

Tynedale Park
Attendance: 406
Referee: Andrew Jackson

=== Round 4 ===
22 September 2012
14:30

| Blaydon | 41-17 | Fylde |
| | Report |

Crow Trees
Attendance: 210
Referee: Marcus Caton

22 September 2012
14:30

| Cinderford | 38-19 | Macclesfield |
| | Report Report |

Recreation Ground
Attendance: 360
Referee: Phil Davies

22 September 2012
14:30

| Sedgley Park | 37-17 | Richmond |
| | Report |

Park Lane
Attendance: 291
Referee: Tom Davis

22 September 2012
15:00

| Cambridge | 14-32 | Rosslyn Park |
| | Report |

Grantchester Road
Attendance: 402
Referee: John Meredith

22 September 2012
15:00

| Coventry | 41-34 | Loughborough Students |
| | Report |

Butts Park Arena
Attendance: 820
Referee: Simon Harding

22 September 2012
15:00

| Ealing Trailfinders | 56-24 | Tynedale |
| | Report |

Trailfinders Ground
Attendance: 230
Referee: Shane Lewis

22 September 2012
15:00

| Old Albanian | 31-51 | Blackheath |
| | Report |

Woollams
Attendance: 380
Referee: Richard Kelly

22 September 2012
15:00

| Wharfedale | 18-15 | Esher |
| | Report |

The Avenue
Attendance: 683
Referee: Karl Kirkpatrick

=== Round 5 ===
29 September 2012
14:00

| Loughborough Students | 10-32 | Wharfedale |
| | Report |

Ashby Road
Attendance: 317
Referee: Tom Foley

29 September 2012
14:30

| Rosslyn Park | 27-15 | Coventry |
| | Report |

The Rock
Attendance: 450
Referee: Nick Cockburn

29 September 2012
15:00

| Blackheath | 41-23 | Blaydon |
| | Report |

Rectory Field
Attendance: 822
Referee: Shane Lewis

29 September 2012
15:00

| Esher | 54-41 | Old Albanian |
| | Report Report |

Molesey Road
Attendance: 678
Referee: Andrew Jackson

29 September 2012
15:00

| Fylde | 12-11 | Sedgley Park |
| | Report |

Woodlands
Attendance: 632
Referee: Rob Debney

29 September 2012
15:00

| Macclesfield | 36-10 | Cambridge |
| | Report |

Priory Park
Attendance: 267
Referee: Terry Hall

29 September 2012
15:00

| Richmond | 27-27 | Ealing Trailfinders |
| | Report |

Richmond Athletic Ground
Attendance: 923
Referee: Philip Davis

29 September 2012
15:00

| Tynedale | 36-30 | Cinderford |
| | Report |

Tynedale Park
Attendance: 388
Referee: Andrew Taylorson

=== Round 6 ===
6 October 2012
14:30

| Blaydon | 34-38 | Esher |
| | Report |

Crow Trees
Attendance: 215
Referee: Wayne Falla

6 October 2012
14:30

| Cinderford | 20-20 | Richmond |
| | Report |

Recreation Ground
Attendance: 357
Referee: Marcus Caton

6 October 2012
14:30

| Rosslyn Park | 38-19 | Loughborough Students |
| | Report |

The Rock
Attendance: 585
Referee: Shane Lewis

6 October 2012
14:30

| Sedgley Park | 40-22 | Blackheath |
| | Report |

Park Lane
Attendance: 307
Referee: Tom Foley

6 October 2012
15:00

| Cambridge | 22-20 | Tynedale |
| | Report |

Grantchester Road
Attendance: 420
Referee: Andrew Jackson

6 October 2012
15:00

| Coventry | 38-3 | Macclesfield |
| | Report |

Butts Park Arena
Attendance: 849
Referee: Tom Davis

6 October 2012
15:00

| Ealing Trailfinders | 36-31 | Fylde |
| | Report |

Trailfinders Ground
Attendance: 412
Referee: Ian Tempest

6 October 2012
15:00

| Old Albanian | 27-27 | Wharfedale |
| | Report |

Woollams
Attendance: 320
Referee: Terry Hall

=== Round 7 ===
13 October 2012
14:00

| Loughborough Students | 13-12 | Old Albanian |
| | Report |

Ashby Road
Attendance: 212

13 October 2012
15:00

| Blackheath | 41-42 | Ealing Trailfinders |
| | Report |

Rectory Field
Attendance: 1,137
Referee: Darren Gamage

13 October 2012
15:00

| Esher | 38-16 | Sedgley Park |
| | Report Report |

Molesey Road
Attendance: 750
Referee: Marcus Caton

13 October 2012
15:00

| Fylde | 44-12 | Cinderford |
| | Report |

Woodlands
Attendance: 610
Referee: Wayne Falla

13 October 2012
15:00

| Macclesfield | 25-30 | Rosslyn Park |
| | Report |

Priory Park
Attendance: 302
Referee: Steve Lee

13 October 2012
15:00

| Richmond | 30-10 | Cambridge |
| | Report |

Richmond Athletic Ground
Attendance: 758
Referee: Tom Davis

13 October 2012
15:00

| Tynedale | 22-23 | Coventry |
| | Report |

Tynedale Park
Attendance: 410
Referee: Andrew Taylorson

13 October 2012
15:00

| Wharfedale | 28-32 | Blaydon |
| | Report |

The Avenue
Attendance: 692
Referee: Philip Davis

=== Round 8 ===
20 October 2012
14:30

| Blaydon | 38-29 | Old Albanian |
| | Report |

Crow Trees
Attendance: 419
Referee: Steve Lee

20 October 2012
14:30

| Cinderford | 34-19 | Blackheath |
| | Report |

Recreation Ground
Attendance: 502
Referee: Phillip Davis

20 October 2012
14:30

| Rosslyn Park | 63-20 | Tynedale |
| | Report |

The Rock
Attendance: 520
Referee: Nick Cockburn

20 October 2012
14:30

| Sedgley Park | 16-18 | Wharfedale |
| | Report |

Park Lane
Attendance: 278
Referee: Andrew Taylorson

20 October 2012
15:00

| Cambridge | 7-26 | Fylde |
| | Report |

Grantchester Road
Attendance: 524
Referee: Richard Kelly

20 October 2012
15:00

| Coventry | 20-20 | Richmond |
| | Report |

Butts Park Arena
Attendance: 1,166
Referee: Shane Lewis

20 October 2012
15:00

| Ealing Trailfinders | 26-21 | Esher |
| | Report |

Trailfinders Ground
Attendance: 892
Referee: Terry Hall

20 October 2012
15:00

| Macclesfield | 24-31 | Loughborough Students |
| | Report |

Priory Park
Attendance: 287
Referee: Karl Kirkpatrick

=== Round 9 ===
27 October 2012
14:00

| Loughborough Students | 18-37 | Blaydon |
| | Report |

Ashby Road
Attendance: 359

27 October 2012
14:00

| Wharfedale | 17-41 | Ealing Trailfinders |
| | Report Report |

The Avenue
Attendance: 653

27 October 2012
14:30

| Tynedale | 21-27 | Macclesfield |
| | Report |

Tynedale Park
Attendance: 362
Referee: Andrew Taylorson

27 October 2012
15:00

| Blackheath | 35-18 | Cambridge |
| | Report |

Rectory Field
Attendance: 673
Referee: Michael Tutty

27 October 2012
15:00

| Esher | 19-12 | Cinderford |
| | Report |

Molesey Road
Attendance: 640
Referee: Simon Harding

27 October 2012
15:00

| Fylde | 22-20 | Coventry |
| | Report |

Woodlands
Attendance: 725
Referee: Terry Hall

27 October 2012
15:00

| Old Albanian | 31-9 | Sedgley Park |
| | Report |

Woollams
Attendance: 320
Referee: Richard Kelly

27 October 2012
15:00

| Richmond | 17-37 | Rosslyn Park |
| | Report |

Richmond Athletic Ground
Attendance: 1,437
Referee: Matt Carley

=== Round 10 ===
3 November 2012
15:00

| Cambridge | 29-51 | Esher |
| | Report |

Grantchester Road
Attendance: 478
Referee: Craig Maxwell Keys

3 November 2012
15:00

| Tynedale | 17-37 | Loughborough Students |
| | Report |

Tynedale Park
Attendance: 310
Referee: Marcus Caton

3 November 2012
15:30

| Cinderford | 36-23 | Wharfedale |
| | Report |

Recreation Ground
Attendance: 408
Referee: Richard Kelly

3 November 2012
15:30

| Rosslyn Park | 52-29 | Fylde |
| | Report |

The Rock
Attendance: 625
Referee: Philip Davis

3 November 2012
15:30

| Sedgley Park | 8-24 | Blaydon |
| | Report |

Park Lane
Attendance: 256
Referee: Simon Harding

3 November 2012
16:00

| Ealing Trailfinders | 25-31 | Old Albanian |
| | Report |

Trailfinders Ground
Attendance: 289
Referee: Nick Cockburn

3 November 2012
16:00

| Macclesfield | 15-19 | Richmond |
| | Report |

Priory Park
Attendance: 310
Referee: Andrew Taylorson

4 November 2012
16:00

| Coventry | 13-10 | Blackheath |
| | Report |

Butts Park Arena
Attendance: 855
Referee: Greg MacDonald

=== Round 11 ===
10 November 2012
14:00

| Blaydon | 35-34 | Ealing Trailfinders |
| | Report |

Crow Trees
Attendance: 332
Referee: Marcus Caton

10 November 2012
14:00

| Wharfedale | 51-23 | Cambridge |
| | Report |

The Avenue
Attendance: 573
Referee: Andrew Taylorson

10 November 2012
14:30

| Loughborough Students | 70-14 | Sedgley Park |

Ashby Road
Attendance: 273
Referee: Andrew Jackson

10 November 2012
14:30

| Richmond | 44-31 | Tynedale |
| | Report |

Richmond Athletic Ground
Attendance: 324
Referee: Simon Harding

10 November 2012
15:00

| Blackheath | 15-20 | Rosslyn Park |
| | Report |

Rectory Field
Attendance: 1,087
Referee: Richard Kelly

10 November 2012
15:00

| Esher | 27-10 | Coventry |
| | Report Report |

Molesey Road
Attendance: 676
Referee: Terry Hall

10 November 2012
15:00

| Fylde | 36-22 | Macclesfield |
| | Report |

Woodlands
Attendance: 625
Referee: Wayne Falla

10 November 2012
15:00

| Old Albanian | 28-25 | Cinderford |
| | Report |

Woollams
Attendance: 310
Referee: Tom Davis

=== Round 12 ===
16 November 2012
19:30

| Rosslyn Park | 20-14 | Esher |
| | Report |

The Rock
Attendance: 1,102
Referee: Simon Harding

17 November 2012
12:30

| Richmond | 24-25 | Loughborough Students |
| | Report |

Richmond Athletic Ground
Attendance: 379
Referee: Nick Cockburn

17 November 2012
14:00

| Cambridge | 31-46 | Old Albanian |
| | Report |

Grantchester Road
Attendance: 434
Referee: Philip Davis

17 November 2012
14:00

| Tynedale | 45-10 | Fylde |
| | Report |

Tynedale Park
Attendance: 331
Referee: Andrew Jackson

17 November 2012
14:30

| Cinderford | 10-24 | Blaydon |
| | Report |

Recreation Ground
Attendance: 283
Referee: Tom Foley

17 November 2012
15:00

| Coventry | 27-11 | Wharfedale |
| | Report |

Butts Park Arena
Attendance: 810
Referee: Shane Lewis

17 November 2012
15:00

| Ealing Trailfinders | 59-17 | Sedgley Park |
| | Report |

Trailfinders Ground
Attendance: 204
Referee: Tom Davis

17 November 2012
15:00

| Macclesfield | 20-13 | Blackheath |
| | Report |

Priory Park
Attendance: 267
Referee: Karl Kirkpatrick

=== Round 13 ===
24 November 2012
14:00

| Blaydon | 39-12 | Cambridge |
| | Report |

Crow Trees
Attendance: 139
Referee: David Procter

24 November 2012
14:00

| Loughborough Students | 5-41 | Ealing Trailfinders |
| | Report |

Ashby Road
Attendance: 242

24 November 2012
14:00

| Wharfedale | 33-24 | Rosslyn Park |
| | Report |

The Avenue
Attendance: 592
Referee: Terry Hall

24 November 2012
14:30

| Sedgley Park | 29-39 | Cinderford |
| | Report |

Park Lane
Attendance: 257
Referee: Simon Harding

24 November 2012
15:00

| Blackheath | 21-14 | Tynedale |
| | Report |

Rectory Field
Attendance: 423
Referee: Andrew Jackson

24 November 2012
15:00

| Esher | 35-3 | Macclesfield |
| | Report |

Molesey Road
Attendance: 600
Referee: Rob Warburton

24 November 2012
15:00

| Fylde | 50-17 | Richmond |
| | Report |

Woodlands
Attendance: 575
Referee: Andrew Taylorson

24 November 2012
15:00

| Old Albanian | 20-3 | Coventry |
| | Report Report |

Woollams
Attendance: 280
Referee: Wayne Falla

=== Round 14 ===
8 December 2012
14:00

| Cambridge | 52-17 | Sedgley Park |
| | Report Report |

Grantchester Road
Attendance: 424
Referee: Richard Kelly

8 December 2012
14:00

| Tynedale | 26-29 | Esher |
| | Report |

Tynedale Park
Attendance: 316
Referee: Wayne Falla

8 December 2012
14:30

| Cinderford | 10-11 | Ealing Trailfinders |
| | Report |

Recreation Ground
Attendance: 361
Referee: Marcus Caton

8 December 2012
14:30

| Rosslyn Park | 36-19 | Old Albanian |
| | Report |

The Rock
Attendance: 420
Referee: Terry Hall

8 December 2012
15:00

| Coventry | 8-17 | Blaydon |
| | Report |

Butts Park Arena
Attendance: 945
Referee: K White

8 December 2012
15:00

| Fylde | 9-11 | Loughborough Students |
| | Report |

Woodlands
Attendance: 765
Referee: Tom Davis

8 December 2012
15:00

| Macclesfield | 20-17 | Wharfedale |
| | Report |

Priory Park
Attendance: 327
Referee: Andrew Taylorson

8 December 2012
15:00

| Richmond | 21-30 | Blackheath |
| | Report |

Richmond Athletic Ground
Attendance: 936
Referee: Craig Maxwell Keys

=== Round 15 ===
15 December 2012
14:00

| Blaydon | 28-22 | Rosslyn Park |
| | Report |

Crow Trees
Attendance: 410
Referee: Andrew Taylorson

15 December 2012
14:00

| Loughborough Students | 28-25 | Cinderford |
| | Report |

Ashby Road
Attendance: 263

15 December 2012
14:00

| Wharfedale | 15-24 | Tynedale |
| | Report |

The Avenue
Attendance: 425
Referee: Marcus Caton

15 December 2012
14:30

| Sedgley Park | 19-17 | Coventry |
| | Report |

Park Lane
Attendance: 317
Referee: John Meredith

15 December 2012
15:00

| Blackheath | 14-17 | Fylde |
| | Report |

Rectory Field
Attendance: 747
Referee: Nick Cockburn

15 December 2012
15:00

| Ealing Trailfinders | 47-11 | Cambridge |
| | Report |

Trailfinders Ground
Attendance: 342
Referee: Philip Davis

15 December 2012
15:00

| Esher | 19-23 | Richmond |
| | Report |

Molesey Road
Attendance: 700
Referee: Richard Kelly

15 December 2012
15:00

| Old Albanian | 32-6 | Macclesfield |
| | Report |

Woollams
Attendance: 320
Referee: Rob Warburton

=== Round 16 ===
22 December 2012

| Macclesfield | P - P | Sedgley Park |

- Postponed. Game rescheduled for 9 February 2013.

22 December 2012

| Fylde | P - P | Wharfedale |

- Postponed. Game rescheduled for 9 February 2013.

22 December 2012
14:00

| Loughborough Students | 34-21 | Cambridge |
| | Report |

Ashby Road
Attendance: 173

- Game brought forward from 9 February 2013.

22 December 2012
14:00

| Tynedale | 13-19 | Blaydon |
| | Report |

Tynedale Park
Attendance: 530
Referee: Philip Davis

22 December 2012
14:30

| Coventry | 29-12 | Cinderford |
| | Report |

Butts Park Arena
Attendance: 865
Referee: Terry Hall

22 December 2012
15:00

| Blackheath | 24-3 | Esher |
| | Report |

Rectory Field
Attendance: 683
Referee: Tom Davis

22 December 2012
15:00

| Richmond | 24-5 | Old Albanian |
| | Report |

Richmond Athletic Ground
Attendance: 612
Referee: Karl Kirkpatrick

22 December 2012
15:00

| Rosslyn Park | 16-16 | Ealing Trailfinders |
| | Report |

The Rock
Attendance: 1,150
Referee: Greg MacDonald

=== Round 17 ===
5 January 2013
14:00

| Blaydon | 24-22 | Richmond |
| | Report |

Crow Tres
Attendance: 280
Referee: Wayne Falla

5 January 2013
14:00

| Cambridge | 21-41 | Coventry |
| | Report |

Grantchester Road
Attendance: 387
Referee: Nick Cockburn

5 January 2013
14:00

| Wharfedale | 15-25 | Blackheath |
| | Report |

The Avenue
Attendance: 583
Referee: Andrew Taylorson

5 January 2013
14:30

| Cinderford | 36-21 | Rosslyn Park |
| | Report |

Recreation Ground
Attendance: 359
Referee: Philip Davis

5 January 2013
14:30

| Sedgley Park | 9-19 | Tynedale |
| | Report |

Park Lane
Attendance: 282
Referee: Karl Kirkpatrick

5 January 2013
15:00

| Ealing Trailfinders | 34-13 | Macclesfield |
| | Report |

Trailfinders Ground
Attendance: 352
Referee: Terry Hall

5 January 2013
15:00

| Esher | 45-26 | Loughborough Students |
| | Report |

Molesey Road
Attendance: 600
Referee: Shane Lewis

5 January 2013
15:00

| Old Albanian | 31-10 | Fylde |
| | Report Report |

Woollams
Attendance: 350
Referee: Marcus Caton

=== Round 18 ===
12 January 2013
14:00

| Loughborough Students | 6-27 | Coventry |
| | Report |

Ashby Road
Attendance: 350

12 January 2013
14:00

| Tynedale | 22-25 | Ealing Trailfinders |
| | Report |

Tynedale Park
Attendance: 362
Referee: Andrew Taylorson

12 January 2013
14:30

| Rosslyn Park | 104-5 | Cambridge |
| | Report |

The Rock
Attendance: 642
Referee: Philip Davis

12 January 2013
15:00

| Blackheath | 27-32 | Old Albanian |
| | Report |

Rectory Field
Attendance: 642
Referee: Philip Davis

12 January 2013
15:00

| Esher | 64-20 | Wharfedale |
| | Report |

Molesey Road
Attendance: 500
Referee: Craig Maxwell Keys

12 January 2013
15:00

| Fylde | 23-19 | Blaydon |
| | Report |

Woodlands
Attendance: 657
Referee: Shane Lewis

12 January 2013
15:00

| Richmond | 32-13 | Sedgley Park |
| | Report |

Richmond Athletic Ground
Attendance: 412
Referee: David Procter

12 January 2013
15:00

| Macclesfield | 35-24 | Cinderford |
| | Report |

The Rock
Attendance: 270
Referee: Tom Davis

=== Round 19 ===
19 January 2013

| Blaydon | P - P | Blackheath |

- Postponed. Game rescheduled to 9 February 2013.

19 January 2013

| Cambridge | P - P | Macclesfield |

- Postponed. Game rescheduled to 23 February 2013.

19 January 2013

| Cinderford | P - P | Tynedale |

- Postponed. Game rescheduled to 9 February 2013.

19 January 2013

| Coventry | P - P | Rosslyn Park |

- Postponed. Game rescheduled to 9 February 2013.

19 January 2013

| Ealing Trailfinders | P - P | Richmond |

- Postponed. Game rescheduled to 9 February 2013.

19 January 2013

| Old Albanian | P - P | Esher |

- Postponed. Game rescheduled to 9 February 2013.

19 January 2013

| Sedgley Park | P - P | Fylde |

- Postponed. Game rescheduled to 23 February 2013.

19 January 2013

| Wharfedale | P - P | Loughborough Students |

- Postponed. Game rescheduled to 23 February 2013.

=== Round 20 ===
26 January 2013
15:00

| Esher | 29-14 | Blaydon |
| | Report |

Molesey Road
Attendance: 600
Referee: Darren Gamage

26 January 2013
15:00

| Richmond | 53-20 | Cinderford |
| | Report |

Richmond Athletic Ground
Attendance: 517
Referee: Richard Kelly

26 January 2013

| Blackheath | P - P | Sedgley Park |

- Postponed. Game rescheduled to 16 March 2013.

26 January 2013

| Fylde | P - P | Ealing Trailfinders |

- Postponed. Game rescheduled to 16 March 2013.

26 January 2013

| Loughborough Students | P - P | Rosslyn Park |

- Postponed. Game rescheduled to 16 March 2013.

26 January 2013

| Macclesfield | P - P | Coventry |

- Postponed. Game rescheduled to 16 March 2013.

26 January 2013

| Tynedale | P - P | Cambridge |

- Postponed. Game rescheduled to 16 March 2013.

26 January 2013

| Wharfedale | P - P | Old Albanian |

- Postponed. Game rescheduled to 16 March 2013.

=== Round 21 ===
2 February 2013
14:00

| Blaydon | 36-31 | Wharfedale |
| | Report Report |

Crow Trees
Attendance: 210
Referee: Philip Davis

2 February 2013
14:00

| Cambridge | 7-9 | Richmond |
| | Report |

Grantchester Road
Attendance: 476
Referee: Terry Hall

2 February 2013
14:00

| Old Albanian | 40-42 | Loughborough Students |
| | Report |

Woollams
Attendance: 340
Referee: Nick Cockburn

2 February 2013
14:30

| Cinderford | 52-19 | Fylde |
| | Report |

Recreation Ground
Attendance: 298
Referee: Andrew Jackson

2 February 2013
14:30

| Coventry | 29-19 | Tyndedale |
| | Report |

Butts Park Arena
Attendance: 734
Referee: Richard Kelly

2 February 2013
14:30

| Rosslyn Park | 46-10 | Macclesfield |
| | Report |

The Rock
Attendance: 231
Referee: Shane Lewis

2 February 2013
14:30

| Sedgley Park | 22-34 | Esher |
| | Report |

Park Lane
Attendance: 252
Referee: Wayne Falla

2 February 2013
15:00

| Ealing Trailfinders | 21-14 | Blackheath |
| | Report |

Trailfinders Ground
Attendance: 331
Referee: Ross Campbell

=== Round 16 & 19 (Rescheduled games) ===
9 February 2013
14:00

| Blaydon | 20-21 | Blackheath |
| | Report |

Crow Trees
Attendance: 240
Referee: Wayne Falla

9 February 2013
14:30

| Cinderford | 33-20 | Tynedale |
| | Report |

Recreation Ground
Attendance: 249
Referee: David Procter

9 February 2013
15:00

| Coventry | 3-16 | Rosslyn Park |
| | Report |

Butts Park Arena
Attendance: 648
Referee: Andrew Jackson

9 February 2013
15:00

| Ealing Trailfinders | 34-17 | Richmond |
| | Report |

Trailfinders Ground
Attendance: 396
Referee: Rob Warburton

9 February 2013
15:00

| Fylde | 25-21 | Wharfedale |
| | Report |

Woodlands
Attendance: 679
Referee: Craig Maxwell Keys

- Game originally set for 22 December 2012.

9 February 2013
15:00

| Macclesfield | 19-3 | Sedgley Park |
| | Report Report |

Priory Park
Attendance: 345
Referee: Marcus Caton

- Game originally set for 22 December 2012.

9 February 2013
15:00

| Old Albanian | 21-20 | Esher |
| | Report |

Woollams
Attendance: 310
Referee: Terry Hall

9 February 2013

| Loughborough Students | P - P | Cambridge |

- Game brought forward to 22 December 2012.

=== Round 22 ===
16 February 2013
14:00

| Loughborough Students | 19-22 | Macclesfield |
| | Report |

Ashby Road
Attendance: 325

16 February 2013
14:00

| Tynedale | 38-24 | Rosslyn Park |
| | Report |

Tynedale Park
Attendance: 433

16 February 2013
14:00

| Wharfedale | 22-26 | Sedgley Park |
| | Report |

The Avenue
Attendance: 575
Referee: Nick Cockburn

16 February 2013
15:00

| Blackheath | 30-22 | Cinderford |
| | Report |

Rectory Field
Attendance: 683
Referee: Rob Warburton

16 February 2013
15:00

| Esher | 33-36 | Ealing Trailfinders |
| | Report |

Molesey Road
Attendance: 1,070
Referee: Philip Davis

16 February 2013
15:00

| Fylde | 27-33 | Cambridge |
| | Report |

Woodlands
Attendance: 735
Referee: Karl Kirkpatrick

16 February 2013
15:00

| Old Albanian | 14-28 | Blaydon |
| | Report |

Woollams
Attendance: 310
Referee: Greg MacDonald

16 February 2013
15:00

| Richmond | 34-33 | Coventry |
| | Report |

Richmond Athletic Ground
Attendance: 417
Referee: Tom Davis

=== Round 19 (Rescheduled games) ===
23 February 2013
14:00

| Cambridge | 24-27 | Macclesfield |
| | Report |

Grantchester Road
Attendance: 320
Referee: Philip Davis

23 February 2013
14:30

| Sedgley Park | 20-59 | Fylde |
| | Report |

Park Lane
Attendance: 251
Referee: Andrew Taylorson

23 February 2013
14:30

| Wharfedale | 33-22 | Loughborough Students |
| | Report |

The Avenue
Attendance: 347
Referee: Wayne Falla

=== Round 23 ===
2 March 2013
14:30

| Blaydon | 27-42 | Loughborough Students |
| | Report |

Crow Trees
Attendance: 271
Referee: Andrew Jackson

2 March 2013
14:30

| Cinderford | 37-41 | Esher |
| | Report |

Recreation Ground
Attendance: 512
Referee: Richard Kelly

2 March 2013
14:30

| Sedgley Park | 38-39 | Old Albanian |
| | Report |

Park Lane
Attendance: 217
Referee: Marcus Caton

2 March 2013
15:00

| Cambridge | 26-58 | Blackheath |
| | Report |

Grantchester Road
Attendance: 547
Referee: Rob Warburton

2 March 2013
15:00

| Coventry | 23-24 | Fylde |
| | Report |

Butts Park Arena
Attendance: 903
Referee: Craig Maxwell Keys

2 March 2013
15:00

| Ealing Trailfinders | 41-13 | Wharfedale |
| | Report |

Trailfinders Ground
Attendance: 287
Referee: Terry Hall

2 March 2013
15:00

| Macclesfield | 31-29 | Tynedale |
| | Report |

Priory Park
Attendance: 263
Referee: Karl Kirkpatrick

2 March 2013
15:00

| Rosslyn Park | 28-20 | Richmond |
| | Report |

The Rock
Attendance: 541
Referee: Nick Cockburn

=== Round 24 ===
9 March 2013
14:30

| Blaydon | 32-6 | Sedgley Park |
| | Report |

Crow Trees
Attendance: 125
Referee: Wayne Falla

9 March 2013
14:30

| Loughborough Students | 19-18 | Tynedale |
| | Report |

Ashby Road
Attendance: 301

9 March 2013
15:00

| Blackheath | 8-30 | Coventry |
| | Report |

Rectory Field
Attendance: 596
Referee: Richard Kelly

9 March 2013
15:00

| Esher | 43-26 | Cambridge |
| | Report |

Molesey Road
Attendance: 352
Referee: Craig Maxwell Keys

9 March 2013
15:00

| Fylde | 35-10 | Rosslyn Park |
| | Report |

Woodlands
Attendance: 625
Referee: Tom Davis

9 March 2013
15:00

| Old Albanian | 29-32 | Ealing Trailfinders |
| | Report |

Woollams
Attendance: 410
Referee: Shane Lewis

9 March 2013
15:00

| Richmond | 15-17 | Macclesfield |
| | Report |

Richmond Athletic Ground
Attendance: 421
Referee: Philip Davis

9 March 2013
15:00

| Wharfedale | 22-8 | Cinderford |
| | Report |

The Avenue
Attendance: 432
Referee: Andrew Taylorson

=== Round 20 (Rescheduled games) ===
16 March 2013
14:00

| Loughborough Students | 36-35 | Rosslyn Park |
| | Report |

Ashby Road
Attendance: 254

16 March 2013
14:00

| Tynedale | 64-14 | Cambridge |
| | Report |

Tynedale Park
Attendance: 314
Referee: Andy Rawson

16 March 2013
14:00

| Wharfedale | 12-15 | Old Albanian |
| | Report |

The Avenue
Attendance: 328
Referee: Craig Maxwell Keys

16 March 2013
15:00

| Blackheath | 53-17 | Sedgley Park |
| | Report |

Rectory Fields
Attendance: 357
Referee: Nick Cockburn

16 March 2013
15:00

| Fylde | 22-15 | Ealing Trailfinders |
| | Report |

Woodlands
Attendance: 723
Referee: Dean Richards

16 March 2013
15:00

| Macclesfield | 16-13 | Coventry |
| | Report |

Priory Park
Attendance: 310
Referee: Andrew Jackson

=== Round 25 ===
23 March 2013
14:00

| Ealing Trailfinders | 12-11 | Blaydon |
| | Report |

Trailfinders Ground
Attendance: 438
Referee: John Meredith

23 March 2013
14:30

| Tynedale | 20-15 | Richmond |
| | Report |

Tynedale Park
Attendance: 415
Referee: Matteo Liperini

23 March 2013
15:00

| Rosslyn Park | 29-9 | Blackheath |
| | Report |

The Rock
Attendance: 562
Referee: Philip Davis

23 March 2013

| Cambridge | P - P | Wharfedale |

- Postponed. Game rescheduled for 4 May 2013.

23 March 2013

| Cinderford | P - P | Old Albanian |

- Postponed. Game rescheduled for 4 May 2013.

23 March 2013

| Coventry | P - P | Esher |

- Postponed. Game rescheduled for 17 April 2013.

23 March 2013

| Macclesfield | P - P | Fylde |

- Postponed. Game rescheduled for 4 May 2013.

23 March 2013

| Sedgley Park | P - P | Loughborough Students |

- Postponed. Game rescheduled for 4 May 2013.

=== Round 26 ===
29 March 2013
15:00

| Blackheath | 13-32 | Macclesfield |
| | Report |

Rectory Field
Attendance: 936
Referee: Tom Davis

30 March 2013
14:00

| Loughborough Students | 27-27 | Richmond |
| | Report |

Ashby Road
Attendance: 362
Referee: Daniel Jones

30 March 2013
14:30

| Blaydon | 32-34 | Cinderford |
| | Report Report |

Crow Trees
Attendance: 206
Referee: Shane Lewis

30 March 2013
14:30

| Sedgley Park | 7-62 | Ealing Trailfinders |
| | Report |

Park Lane
Attendance: 199
Referee: Wayne Falla

30 March 2013
15:00

| Esher | 32-19 | Rosslyn Park |
| | Report |

Molesey Road
Attendance: 1,100
Referee: Tom Foley

30 March 2013
15:00

| Fylde | 23-21 | Tynedale |
| | Report |

Woodlands
Attendance: 613
Referee: Andrew Taylorson

30 March 2013
15:00

| Old Albanian | 50-12 | Cambridge |
| | Report |

Woollams
Attendance: 430
Referee: Rob Warburton

30 March 2013

| Wharfedale | P - P | Coventry |

- Postponed. Rescheduled to 11 March 2013.

=== Round 27 ===
6 April 2013
13:30

| Cinderford | 23-31 | Sedgley Park |
| | Report |

Recreation Ground
Attendance: 307
Referee: Marcus Caton

6 April 2013
13:30

| Rosslyn Park | 50-3 | Wharfedale |
| | Report |

The Rock
Attendance: 450
Referee: Richard Kelly

6 April 2013
14:00

| Cambridge | 23-27 | Blaydon |
| | Report |

Grantchester Road
Attendance: 487
Referee: Terry Hall

6 April 2013
14:00

| Coventry | 34-39 | Old Albanian |
| | Report |

Butts Park Arena
Attendance: 887
Referee: David Procter

6 April 2013
14:00

| Ealing Trailfinders | 41-29 | Loughborough Students |
| | Report |

Trailfinders Ground
Attendance: 295
Referee: Nick Cockburn

6 April 2013
14:00

| Macclesfield | 12-62 | Esher |
| | Report |

Priory Park
Attendance: 431
Referee: Andrew Jackson

6 April 2013
14:00

| Richmond | 36-29 | Fylde |
| | Report |

Richmond Athletic Ground
Attendance: 584
Referee: Tom Davis

6 April 2013
14:00

| Tynedale | 62-22 | Blackheath |
| | Report |

Tynedale
Attendance: 396
Referee: Steve Lee

=== Round 28 ===
13 April 2013
13:30

| Blaydon | 39-25 | Coventry |
| | Report |

Crow Trees
Attendance: 410
Referee: Andrew Jackson

13 April 2013
13:30

| Loughborough Students | 17-35 | Fylde |
| | Report |

Ashby Road
Attendance: 412

13 April 2013
13:30

| Sedgley Park | 29-19 | Cambridge |
| | Report |

Park Lane
Attendance: 261
Referee: Karl Kirkpatrick

13 April 2013
14:00

| Blackheath | 12-21 | Richmond |
| | Report |

Rectory Field
Attendance: 1,143
Referee: Craig Maxwell Keys

13 April 2013
14:00

| Ealing Trailfinders | 28-17 | Cinderford |
| | Report |

Trailfinders Ground
Attendance: 496
Referee: Marcus Caton

13 April 2013
14:00

| Esher | 21-17 | Tynedale |
| | Report |

Molesey Road
Attendance: 526
Referee: Philip Davis

13 April 2013
14:00

| Old Albanian | 17-16 | Rosslyn Park |
| | Report |

Woollams
Attendance: 450
Referee: Terry Hall

13 April 2013
14:00

| Wharfedale | 19-5 | Macclesfield |
| | Report |

The Avenue
Attendance: 783
Referee: Simon Harding

=== Round 25 (Rescheduled game) ===
17 April 2013
19:00

| Coventry | 35-24 | Esher |
| | Report |

Butts Park Arena
Attendance: 672
Referee: Craig Maxwell Keys

=== Round 29 ===
20 April 2013
13:30

| Cinderford | 36-41 | Loughborough Students |
| | Report |

Recreation Ground
Attendance: 402
Referee: Andrea Spandoni

20 April 2013
13:30

| Rosslyn Park | 34-27 | Blaydon |
| | Report |

The Rock
Attendance: 480
Referee: Craig Maxwell Keys

20 April 2013
14:00

| Cambridge | 32-64 | Ealing Trailfinders |
| | Report |

Grantchester Road
Attendance: 610
Referee: Fergus Kirby

20 April 2013
14:00

| Coventry | 61-7 | Sedgley Park |
| | Report |

Butts Park Arena
Attendance: 961
Referee: Shane Lewis

20 April 2013
14:00

| Fylde | 44-28 | Blackheath |
| | Report |

Woodlands
Attendance: 785
Referee: David Procter

20 April 2013
14:00

| Macclesfield | 22-28 | Old Albanian |
| | Report |

Priory Park
Attendance: 321
Referee: Richard Kelly

20 April 2013
14:00

| Richmond | 17-36 | Esher |
| | Report |

Richmond Athletic Ground
Attendance: 1,183
Referee: Rob Warburton

20 April 2013
14:00

| Tynedale | 32-31 | Wharfedale |
| | Report |

Tynedale Park
Attendance: 610
Referee: Greg MacDonald

=== Round 30 ===
27 April 2013
13:30

| Blackheath | 25-29 | Loughborough Students |
| | Report Report |

Rectory Field
Attendance: 836
Referee: Tom Davis

27 April 2013
13:30

| Blaydon | 24-24 | Macclesfield |
| | Report |

Crow Trees
Attendance: 255
Referee: Andrew Taylorson

27 April 2013
13:30

| Cinderford | 47-24 | Cambridge |
| | Report Report |

Recreation Ground
Attendance: 405

27 April 2013
13:30

| Sedgley Park | 22-37 | Rosslyn Park |
| | Report |

Park Lane
Attendance: 257
Referee: Andy Rawson

27 April 2013
14:00

| Ealing Trailfinders | 41-17 | Coventry |
| | Report |

Trailfinders Ground
Attendance: 843
Referee: Simon Harding

27 April 2013
14:00

| Esher | 31-24 | Fylde |
| | Report |

Molesey Road
Attendance: 766
Referee: Shane Lewis

27 April 2013
14:00

| Old Albanian | 57-17 | Tynedale |
| | Report |

Woollams
Attendance: 375
Referee: Nick Cockburn

27 April 2013
14:00

| Wharfedale | 30-26 | Richmond |
| | Report |

The Avenue
Attendance: 833
Referee: Wayne Falla

=== Round 25 (Rescheduled games) ===
4 May 2013
14:00

| Cambridge | 12-28 | Wharfedale |
| | Report |

Grantchester Road
Attendance: 445
Referee: Nick Cockburn

4 May 2013
14:00

| Macclesfield | 29-29 | Fylde |
| | Report |

Priory Park
Attendance: 491
Referee: Wayne Falla

4 May 2013
14:00

| Sedgley Park | 12-106 | Loughborough Students |
| | Report |

Park Lane
Attendance: 106
Referee: Karl Kirkpatrick

4 May 2013

| Cinderford | C - C | Old Albanian |

- Game cancelled.

=== Round 26 (Rescheduled game) ===
11 May 2013

| Wharfedale | C - C | Coventry |

- Game cancelled.

== Total Season Attendances ==
| Club | Total | Average | Highest | Lowest | % Capacity |
|---|---|---|---|---|---|
| Blackheath | 11,544 | 770 | 1,143 | 357 | 22% |
| Blaydon | 4,433 | 296 | 711 | 125 | 15% |
| Cambridge | 6,855 | 457 | 610 | 320 | 21% |
| Cinderford | 5,273 | 377 | 512 | 249 | 15% |
| Coventry | 12,861 | 857 | 1,166 | 648 | 21% |
| Ealing Trailfinders | 6,650 | 443 | 892 | 204 | 15% |
| Esher | 10,408 | 694 | 1,100 | 352 | 23% |
| Fylde | 9,883 | 658 | 765 | 575 | 9% |
| Loughborough Students | 4,406 | 294 | 412 | 173 | 10% |
| Macclesfield | 4,873 | 325 | 491 | 263 | 26% |
| Old Albanian | 5,245 | 350 | 450 | 280 | 35% |
| Richmond | 10,085 | 672 | 1,437 | 324 | 15% |
| Rosslyn Park | 8,878 | 592 | 1,150 | 231 | 30% |
| Sedgley Park | 3,958 | 264 | 427 | 106 | 9% |
| Tynedale | 5,993 | 400 | 610 | 310 | 20% |
| Wharfedale | 8,148 | 582 | 833 | 328 | 29% |

== Individual statistics ==
- Note if players are tied on tries or points the player with the lowest number of appearances will come first. Also note that points scorers includes tries as well as conversions, penalties and drop goals.

=== Top points scorers ===
| Rank | Player | Team | Appearances | Points |
|---|---|---|---|---|
| 1 | (England) Stuart Hall | Loughborough Students | 30 | 319 |
| 2 | (England) Tom Wheatcroft | Ealing Trailfinders | 27 | 315 |
| 3 | (South Africa) Clifford Hodgson | Coventry | 29 | 310 |
| 4 | (England) Chris Johnson | Fylde | 28 | 251 |
| 5 | (England) Rory Teague | Blackheath | 22 | 248 |
| 6 | (England) Sam Katz | Rosslyn Park | 21 | 238 |
| 6 | (England) Andrew Baggett | Blaydon | 26 | 238 |
| 7 | (England) Mark Davies | Cinderford | 27 | 228 |
| 8 | (England) Thomas Platt | Richmond | 25 | 203 |
| 9 | (England) Richard Gregg | Old Albanian | 26 | 200 |

=== Top try scorers ===
| Rank | Player | Team | Appearances | Tries |
|---|---|---|---|---|
| 1 | (England) Phil Chesters | Ealing Trailfinders | 23 | 29 |
| 2 | (England) Hugo Ellis | Rosslyn Park | 25 | 26 |
| 3 | (England) Oliver Brennand | Fylde | 29 | 23 |
| 4 | (England) Rob Bell | Blaydon | 25 | 19 |
| 4 | (England) David Allen | Blackheath | 26 | 19 |
| 5 | (England) Hamish Smales | Tynedale | 22 | 18 |
| 6 | (England) Neville Edwards | Rosslyn Park | 25 | 17 |
| 6 | (England) Nevard Codlin | Cinderford | 26 | 17 |
| 6 | (England) Lloyd Stapleton | Cinderford | 29 | 17 |
| 7 | (England) Charlie Walker | Esher | 19 | 16 |

== Season records ==
=== Team ===
Largest home win — 99 pts

104 - 5 Rosslyn Park at home to Cambridge on 12 January 2013

Largest away win — 93 pts

105 - 12 Loughborough Students away to Sedgley Park on 4 May 2013

Most points scored — 105 pts

105 - 12 Loughborough Students away to Sedgley Park on 4 May 2013

Most tries in a match — 16 (x2)

Rosslyn Park at home to Cambridge on 12 January 2013
Loughborough Students away to Sedgley Park on 4 May 2013

Most conversions in a match — 13

Loughborough Students away to Sedgley Park on 4 May 2013

Most penalties in a match — 6

Ealing Trailfinders away to Blackheath on 13 October 2012

Most drop goals in a match — 1

N/A - multiple teams

=== Player ===
Most points in a match — 36

(England) Stuart Hall for Loughborough Students away to Sedgley Park on 4 May 2013

Most tries in a match — 7

(England) Hugo Ellis for Rosslyn Park at home to Cambridge on 12 January 2013

Most conversions in a match — 13

(England) Stuart Hall for Loughborough Students away to Sedgley Park on 4 May 2013

Most penalties in a match — 6

(England) Tom Wheatcroft for Ealing Trailfinders away to Blackheath on 13 October 2012

Most drop goals in a match — 1

N/A - multiple players

=== Attendances ===
Highest — 1,437

Richmond at home to Rosslyn Park on 27 October 2012

Lowest — 106

Sedgley Park at home to Loughborough Students on 4 May 2013

Highest Average Attendance — 857

Coventry

Lowest Average Attendance — 264

Sedgley Park
