= 2011–12 National League 1 =

Rugby union competition in England

- Countries: England; Jersey
- Champions: Jersey
- Runners-up: Ealing Trailfinders
- Relegated: Birmingham & Solihull, Stourbridge, Barking
- Attendance: 138,972 (average 581 per match) (Note: Note that 1 home attendance is missing (see below) - so the total attendance will not be 100% accurate. The average attendance has also been taken into account with the missing game not included.)
- Highest attendance: 3,648 Jersey at home to Rosslyn Park on 14 January 2012
- Lowest attendance: 101 Barking at home to Rosslyn Park on 3 September 2011
- Top point scorer: (England) Rory Teague; Cinderford 254 points
- Top try scorer: (England) Phil Chesters; Ealing Trailfinders 42 tries

The 2011–12 National League 1 is the third season of the third division of the English domestic rugby union competitions since the professionalised format of the second division was introduced. Birmingham & Solihull find themselves playing in this league following their relegation from the 2010–11 RFU Championship in the play-offs, whilst other newcomers to the league in this season are Ealing Trailfinders and Jersey, and Fylde, who won promotion to the league from the 2010–11 National League 2 South and 2010–11 National League 2 North respectively.

The league title was contested by two of the newly promoted sides with Jersey finishing the season ahead of rivals Ealing Trailfinders, despite a 5-point deduction. By winning the league Jersey secured their third promotion in as many seasons, moving up to the 2012–13 RFU Championship. They were also easily the most popular team in the division with over 33,000 fans attending the 15 home games held at St Peter - a National League 1 record. At the opposite end of the table, Birmingham & Solihull and Stourbridge were relegated to the 2012–13 National League 2 North while Barking dropped down to the 2012–13 National League 2 South having been league runners up the previous season.

== Participating teams and locations ==
Locations of the 2011-12 National League 1 teams
Greater London National League 1 clubs

Team	Stadium	Capacity	City/Area
Barking	Goresbrook	1,000	Becontree, Dagenham, London
Birmingham & Solihull	Damson Park	3,050	Solihull, West Midlands
Blackheath	Rectory Field	3,500 (500 seats)	Blackheath, London
Blaydon	Crow Trees	2,000 (400 seats)	Swalwell, Tyne and Wear
Cambridge	Grantchester Road	2,200 (200 seats)	Cambridge, Cambridgeshire
Cinderford	Dockham Road	2,500	Cinderford, Gloucestershire
Coventry	Butts Park Arena	4,000 (3,000 seats)	Coventry
Ealing Trailfinders	Trailfinders Sports Ground	3,020	West Ealing, London
Fylde	Woodlands Memorial Ground	7,500 (500 seats)	Lytham St. Annes, Lancashire
Jersey	St Peter	5,000	Saint Peter, Jersey
Macclesfield	Priory Park	1,250 (250 seats)	Macclesfield, Cheshire
Rosslyn Park	The Rock	2,000 (630 seats)	Roehampton, London
Sedgley Park	Park Lane	3,000	Whitefield, Greater Manchester
Stourbridge	Stourton Park	3,500 (499 seats)	Stourbridge, West Midlands
Tynedale	Tynedale Park	2,000 (400 seats)	Corbridge, Northumberland
Wharfedale	The Avenue	2,000	Threshfield, Craven, North Yorkshire

== League table ==
2011–12 National League 1 table
Pos	Team	Pld	W	D	L	PF	PA	PD	B	Pts	Qualification
1	Jersey (C)	30	26	0	4	918	363	+555	20	119 (Note: Both Jersey and Birmingham & Solihull were given 5-point deductions for breaching player eligibility rules.)	Promoted
2	Ealing Trailfinders	30	20	3	7	1000	650	+350	26	112	
3	Blackheath	30	20	1	9	900	731	+169	24	106	
4	Fylde	30	18	1	11	898	751	+147	26	100	
5	Rosslyn Park	30	17	1	12	765	657	+108	18	88	
6	Macclesfield	30	15	1	14	815	792	+23	23	85	
7	Blaydon	30	15	2	13	740	683	+57	20	84	
8	Cinderford	30	14	0	16	763	629	+134	23	79	
9	Sedgley Park	30	14	0	16	715	856	−141	17	73	
10	Wharfedale	30	13	0	17	685	701	−16	19	71	
11	Tynedale	30	12	0	18	700	784	−84	23	71	
12	Cambridge	30	13	0	17	810	978	−168	18	70	
13	Coventry	30	13	3	14	644	807	−163	9	67	
14	Birmingham & Solihull (R)	30	10	0	20	571	945	−374	10	45	Relegated
15	Stourbridge (R)	30	7	0	23	627	861	−234	16	44	Relegated
16	Barking (R)	30	7	0	23	571	934	−363	13	41	Relegated

Source: statbunker.com
Rules for classification: If teams are level at any stage, tiebreakers are applied in the following order:
1. Number of matches won
2. Difference between points for and against
3. Total number of points for
4. Aggregate number of points scored in matches between tied teams
5. Number of matches won excluding the first match, then the second and so on until the tie is settled
  (C) Champion; (R) Relegated
  Notes:

== Results ==
=== Round 1 ===
27 August 2011
15:00

Barking	28 - 26	Blaydon (BP)
	Report

Goresbrook
Attendance: 163
Referee: Greg MacDonald

27 August 2011
15:00

Birmingham & Solihull	3 - 35	Ealing Trailfinders (BP)
	Report

Damson Park
Attendance: 307
Referee: Terry Hall

27 August 2011
15:00

(BP) Cambridge	24 - 39	Sedgley Park (BP)
	Report

Grantchester Road
Attendance: 350
Referee: Andrew Jackson

27 August 2011
15:00

Coventry	21 - 15	Cinderford (BP)
	Report

Butts Park Arena
Attendance: 757
Referee: Ross Campbell

27 August 2011
15:00

(BP) Fylde	29 - 27	Jersey (2BP)
	Report

Woodlands Memorial Ground
Attendance: 870
Referee: Steve Lee

27 August 2011
15:00

(BP) Macclesfield	31 - 12	Wharfedale
	Report

Priory Park
Attendance: 210
Referee: Andrew Taylorson

27 August 2011
15:00

Rosslyn Park	26 - 20	Blackheath (BP)
	Report

The Rock
Attendance: 380
Referee: Darren Gamage

27 August 2011
15:00

(BP) Tynedale	39 - 24	Stourbridge (BP)
	Report

Tynedale Park
Attendance: 310
Referee: Nick Cockburn

=== Round 2 ===
3 September 2011
14:30

(BP) Blaydon	31 - 6	Cambridge
	Report

Crow Trees
Attendance: 407
Referee: Steve Lee

3 September 2011
14:30

(BP) Sedgley Park	29 - 10	Tynedale
	Report

Park Lane
Attendance: 320
Referee: Richard Kelly

3 September 2011
15:00

Barking	0 - 19	Rosslyn Park
	Report

Goresbrook
Attendance: 101
Referee: Paul Knowles

3 September 2011
15:00

(2BP) Cinderford	34 - 36	Fylde (BP)
	Report

Dockham Road
Attendance: 385
Referee: Greg MacDonald

3 September 2011
15:00

Ealing Trailfinders	26 - 21	Blackheath (BP)
	Report

Trailfinders Sports Ground
Attendance: 756
Referee: Shane Lewis

3 September 2011
15:00

Jersey	33 - 8	Birmingham & Solihull
	Report

St Peter
Attendance: 1,525
Referee: Michael Tutty

3 September 2011
15:00

(BP) Stourbridge	31 - 49	Macclesfield (BP)
	Report

Stourton Park
Attendance: 350
Referee: John Meredith

3 September 2011
15:00

(BP) Wharfedale	31 - 10	Coventry
	Report

The Avenue
Attendance: 639
Referee: Nick Cockburn

=== Round 3 ===
10 September 2011
14:00

Birmingham & Solihull	29 - 17	Cinderford
	Report

Damson Park
Attendance: 445
Referee: Simon Rees

10 September 2011
14:00

(BP) Tynedale	34 - 25	Blaydon
	Report

Tynedale Park
Attendance: 562
Referee: John Meredith

10 September 2011
15:00

(BP) Blackheath	23 - 27	Jersey
	Report

Rectory Field
Attendance: 437
Referee: Richard Kelly

10 September 2011
15:00

(BP) Cambridge	36 - 31	Barking (2BP)
	Report

Grantchester Road
Attendance: 300
Referee: Michael Tutty

10 September 2011
15:00

Coventry	22 - 17	Stourbridge (BP)
	Report

Butts Park Arena
Attendance: 782
Referee: Andrew Taylorson

10 September 2011
15:00

(BP) Fylde	39 - 12	Wharfedale
	Report

Woodlands Memorial Ground
Attendance: 815
Referee: Simon Harding

10 September 2011
15:00

(BP) Macclesfield	40 - 26	Sedgley Park (BP)
	Report

Priory Park
Attendance: 382
Referee: Philip Davis

10 September 2011
15:00

Rosslyn Park	17 - 33	Ealing Trailfinders (BP)
	Report

The Rock
Attendance: 490
Referee: Johan van Merwe

=== Round 4 ===
17 September 2011
14:00

Jersey	15 - 26	Ealing Trailfinders
	Report

St Peter
Attendance: 1,262
Referee: Andrew Jackson

17 September 2011
14:30

(BP) Blaydon	45 - 22	Macclesfield (BP)
	Report

Crow Trees
Attendance: 215
Referee: Richard Kelly

17 September 2011
14:30

(BP) Sedgley Park	12 - 18	Coventry
	Report

Park Lane
Attendance: 397
Referee: Tom Davis

17 September 2011
15:00

(BP) Barking	22 - 29	Tynedale
	Report

Goresbrook
Attendance: 102
Referee: Simon Harding

17 September 2011
15:00

(BP) Cambridge	36 - 32	Rosslyn Park (2BP)
	Report

Grantchester Road
Attendance: 320

17 September 2011
15:00

(BP) Cinderford	18 - 21	Blackheath
	Report

Dockham Road
Attendance: 240
Referee: Marcus Caton

17 September 2011
15:00

Stourbridge	17 - 40	Fylde (BP)
	Report

Stourton Park
Attendance: 450
Referee: Shane Lewis

17 September 2011
15:00

(BP) Wharfedale	20 - 21	Birmingham & Solihull
	Report

The Avenue
Attendance: 507
Referee: P W Davies

=== Round 5 ===
24 September 2011
14:30

Rosslyn Park	9 - 24	Jersey
	Report

The Rock
Attendance: 506
Referee: Greg MacDonald

24 September 2011
15:00

(BP) Birmingham & Solihull	16 - 19	Stourbridge
	Report

Damson Park
Attendance: 300
Referee: Darren Gamage

24 September 2011
15:00

(BP) Blackheath	27 - 24	Wharfedale (BP)
	Report

Rectory Field
Attendance: 657
Referee: Matt Carley

24 September 2011
15:00

Coventry	27 - 27	Blaydon (BP)
	Report

Butts Park Arena
Attendance: 745
Referee: Johan van Merwe

24 September 2011
15:00

Ealing Trailfinders	21 - 18	Cinderford (BP)
	Report

Trailfinders Sports Ground
Attendance: 170
Referee: Trailfinders

24 September 2011
15:00

(BP) Fylde	43 - 10	Sedgley Park
	Report

Woodlands Memorial Ground
Attendance: 757
Referee: Marcus Caton

24 September 2011
15:00

(BP) Macclesfield	36 - 21	Barking
	Report

Priory Park
Attendance: 297
Referee: Shane Lewis

24 September 2011
15:00

Tynedale	15 - 23	Cambridge
	Report

Tynedale Park
Attendance: 462
Referee: Nick Cockburn

=== Round 6 ===
1 October 2011
14:30

(BP) Blaydon	33 - 17	Fylde
	Report

Crow Trees
Attendance: 236
Referee: Ian Tempest

1 October 2011
14:30

(BP) Sedgley Park	55 - 34	Birmingham & Solihull (BP)
	Report

Park Lane
Attendance: 214
Referee: Karl Kirkpatrick

1 October 2011
15:00

Barking	22 - 34	Coventry (BP)
	Report

Goresbrook
Attendance: 163
Referee: Shane Lewis

1 October 2011
15:00

(BP) Cambridge	32 - 35	Macclesfield (BP)
	Report

Grantchester Road
Attendance: 520
Referee: Simon Harding

1 October 2011
15:00

Cinderford	19 - 16	Jersey (BP)
	Report

Dockham Road
Attendance: 260
Referee: John Meredith

1 October 2011
15:00

(BP) Stourbridge	20 - 25	Blackheath
	Report

Stourton Park
Attendance: 500
Referee: Andrew Jackson

1 October 2011
15:00

(BP) Tynedale	24 - 37	Rosslyn Park
	Report

Tynedale Park
Attendance: 396
Referee: Steve Lee

1 October 2011
15:00

(BP) Wharfedale	29 - 53	Ealing Trailfinders (BP)
	Report

The Avenue
Attendance: 640
Referee: Greg MacDonald

=== Round 7 ===
8 October 2011
14:30

Rosslyn Park	22 - 17	Cinderford (BP)
	Report

The Rock
Attendance: 323

8 October 2011
15:00

(BP) Blackheath	41 - 34	Sedgley Park (2BP)
	Report

Rectory Field
Attendance: 573
Referee: J Matthews

8 October 2011
15:00

(BP) Birmingham & Solihull	31 - 18	Blaydon
	Report

Damson Park
Attendance: 247
Referee: Steve Lee

8 October 2011
15:00

(BP) Coventry	27 - 29	Cambridge (BP)
	Report

Butts Park Arena
Attendance: 1,002

8 October 2011
15:00

Ealing Trailfinders	29 - 22	Stourbridge (BP)
	Report

Trailfinders Sports Ground
Attendance: 440

8 October 2011
15:00

Fylde	18 - 31	Barking
	Report

Woodlands Memorial Ground
Attendance: 624

8 October 2011
15:00

(BP) Jersey	45 - 5	Wharfedale
	Report

St Peter
Attendance: 1,510

8 October 2011
15:00

Macclesfield	5 - 29	Tynedale (BP)
	Report

Priory Park
Attendance: 205

=== Round 8 ===
15 October 2011
14:30

(BP) Blaydon	20 - 25	Blackheath
	Report

Crow Trees
Attendance: 356
Referee: Marcus Caton

15 October 2011
14:30

Sedgley Park	8 - 38	Ealing Trailfinders (BP)
	Report

Park Lane
Attendance: 187
Referee: Paul Knowles

15 October 2011
14:30

(2BP) Tynedale	27 - 32	Coventry (BP)
	Report

Tynedale Park
Attendance: 425
Referee: Tom Davis

15 October 2011
15:00

(BP) Barking	33 - 29	Birmingham & Solihull (2BP)
	Report

Goresbrook
Attendance: 194
Referee: Greg MacDonald

15 October 2011
15:00

(BP) Cambridge	49 - 29	Fylde (BP)
	Report

Grantchester Road
Attendance: 480
Referee: Ross Campbell

15 October 2011
15:00

(2BP) Macclesfield	27 - 33	Rosslyn Park (BP)
	Report

Priory Park
Attendance: 257
Referee: Nick Cockburn

15 October 2011
15:00

(BP) Stourbridge	18 - 19	Jersey
	Report

Stourton Park
Attendance: 550
Referee: Tom Foley

15 October 2011
15:00

Wharfedale	33 - 25	Cinderford
	Report

The Avenue
Attendance: 624
Referee: Shane Lewis

=== Round 9 ===
22 October 2011
14:30

(BP) Ealing Trailfinders	46 - 15	Blaydon
	Report

Trailfinders Sports Ground
Attendance: 329
Referee: Matt Carley

22 October 2011
15:00

Birmingham & Solihull	20 - 49	Cambridge (BP)
	Report

Damson Park
Attendance: 307
Referee: Charles Samson

22 October 2011
15:00

(BP) Blackheath	35 - 18	Barking
	Report

Rectory Field
Attendance: 593
Referee: Richard Kelly

22 October 2011
15:00

(BP) Cinderford	32 - 30	Stourbridge (BP)
	Report

Dockham Road
Attendance: 436
Referee: Andrew Taylorson

22 October 2011
15:00

(BP) Coventry	36 - 25	Macclesfield (BP)
	Report

Butts Park Arena
Attendance: 847
Referee: Philip Davis

22 October 2011
15:00

(BP) Fylde	39 - 28	Tynedale (BP)
	Report

Woodlands Memorial Ground
Attendance: 835
Referee: John Meredith

22 October 2011
15:00

(BP) Jersey	31 - 10	Sedgley Park
	Report

St Peter
Attendance: 1,805
Referee: Simon Harding

22 October 2011
15:00

Rosslyn Park	21 - 17	Wharfedale (BP)
	Report

The Rock
Attendance: 346
Referee: Tom Davis

=== Round 10 ===
29 October 2011
14:00

(BP) Tynedale	49 - 9	Birmingham & Solihull
	Report

Tynedale Park
Attendance: 336
Referee: Karl Kirkpatrick

29 October 2011
14:30

(BP) Blaydon	6 - 12	Jersey
	Report

Crow Trees
Attendance: 256
Referee: Steve Lee

29 October 2011
14:30

Sedgley Park	21 - 17	Cinderford (BP)
	Report

Park Lane
Attendance: 240
Referee: Wayne Falla

29 October 2011
15:00

Barking	22 - 20	Ealing Trailfinders (BP)
	Report

Goresbrook
Attendance: 223
Referee: Simon Harding

29 October 2011
15:00

(BP) Cambridge	42 - 27	Blackheath (BP)
	Report

Grantchester Road
Attendance: 529
Referee: Matt Carley

29 October 2011
15:00

Coventry	30 - 29	Rosslyn Park (2BP)
	Report

Butts Park Arena
Attendance: 1,024
Referee: John Meredith

29 October 2011
15:00

(BP) Macclesfield	24 - 39	Fylde (BP)
	Report

Priory Park
Attendance: 329
Referee: Shane Lewis

29 October 2011
15:00

Stourbridge	23 - 20	Wharfedale (BP)
	Report

Stourton Park
Attendance: 400
Referee: Richard Kelly

=== Round 11 ===
5 November 2011
14:00

(2BP) Wharfedale	28 - 29	Sedgley Park (BP)
	Report

The Avenue
Attendance: 571
Referee: Andrew Taylorson

5 November 2011
14:15

(BP) Jersey	51 - 21	Barking
	Report

St Peter
Attendance: 1,876
Referee: Johan van Merwe

5 November 2011
14:30

(BP) Cinderford	58 - 22	Blaydon (BP)
	Report

Dockham Road
Attendance: 362
Referee: Tom Davis

5 November 2011
14:30

(BP) Rosslyn Park	33 - 24	Stourbridge
	Report

The Rock
Attendance: 370

5 November 2011
15:00

Blackheath	22 - 20	Tynedale (BP)
	Report

Rectory Field
Attendance: 621
Referee: Philip Davis

5 November 2011
15:00

(BP) Ealing Trailfinders	32 - 21	Cambridge
	Report

Trailfinders Sports Ground
Attendance: 427
Referee: Greg MacDonald

5 November 2011
15:00

(BP) Fylde	45 - 14	Coventry
	Report

Woodlands Memorial Ground
Attendance: 865
Referee: Steve Lee

6 November 2011
14:00

Birmingham & Solihull	21 - 17	Macclesfield (BP)
	Report

Damson Park
Attendance: 257
Referee: Richard Kelly

=== Round 12 ===
12 November 2011
14:00

Cambridge	13 - 54	Jersey (BP)
	Report

Grantchester Road
Attendance: 575
Referee: Richard Kelly

12 November 2011
14:15

(BP) Blaydon	22 - 17	Wharfedale (BP)
	Report

Crow Trees
Attendance: 205
Referee: Wayne Falla

12 November 2011
14:30

(BP) Sedgley Park	43 - 35	Stourbridge (BP)
	Report

Park Lane
Attendance: 249
Referee: Philip Davis

12 November 2011
15:00

Barking	3 - 25	Cinderford (BP)
	Report

Goresbrook
Attendance: 141
Referee: Nick Cockburn

12 November 2011
15:00

(BP) Coventry	29 - 13	Birmingham & Solihull
	Report

Butts Park Arena
Attendance: 1,193
Referee: Simon Harding

12 November 2011
15:00

(BP) Fylde	10 - 16	Rosslyn Park
	Report

Woodlands Memorial Ground
Attendance: 882
Referee: Jason Bessant

12 November 2011
15:00

Macclesfield	25 - 13	Blackheath
	Report

Priory Park
Attendance: 374
Referee: Marcus Caton

12 November 2011
15:00

(2BP) Tynedale	24 - 29	Ealing Trailfinders (BP)
	Report

Tynedale Park
Attendance: 348
Referee: Tom Davis

=== Round 13 ===
19 November 2011
14:15

(BP) Wharfedale	29 - 3	Barking
	Report

The Avenue
Attendance: 591
Referee: Karl Kirkpatrick

19 November 2011
14:30

(BP) Cinderford	16 - 23	Cambridge
	Report

Dockham Road
Attendance: 374
Referee: Simon Harding

19 November 2011
14:30

(BP) Rosslyn Park	40 - 18	Sedgley Park
	Report

The Rock
Attendance: 420
Referee: Shane Lewis

19 November 2011
15:00

Birmingham & Solihull	20 - 41	Fylde (BP)
	Report

Damson Park
Attendance: 231
Referee: Paul Knowles

19 November 2011
15:00

(BP) Blackheath	34 - 25	Coventry
	Report

Rectory Field
Attendance: 683
Referee: Darren Gamage

19 November 2011
15:00

Ealing Trailfinders	24 - 35	Macclesfield (BP)
	Report

Trailfinders Sports Ground
Attendance: 304
Referee: Andrew Jackson

19 November 2011
15:00

(BP) Jersey	26 - 8	Tynedale
	Report

St Peter
Attendance: 2,149
Referee: Philip Davis

19 November 2011
15:00

Stourbridge	9 - 29	Blaydon (BP)
	Report

Stourton Park
Attendance: 450
Referee: Andrew Taylorson

=== Round 14 ===
26 November 2011
14:00

Birmingham & Solihull	12 - 59	Rosslyn Park (BP)
	Report

Damson Park
Attendance: 250
Referee: Greg MacDonald

26 November 2011
14:00

Blaydon	15 - 27	Sedgley Park
	Report

Crow Trees
Attendance: 216
Referee: Marcus Caton

26 November 2011
14:00

Cambridge	17 - 31	Wharfedale (BP)
	Report

Grantchester Road
Attendance: 430
Referee: Nick Cockburn

26 November 2011
14:00

(BP) Tynedale	24 - 0	Cinderford
	Report

Tynedale Park
Attendance: 374
Referee: Wayne Falla

26 November 2011
15:00

(BP) Barking	13 - 15	Stourbridge
	Report

Goresbrook
Attendance: 163
Referee: Darren Gamage

26 November 2011
15:00

(BP) Coventry	29 - 26	Ealing Trailfinders (2BP)
	Report

Butts Park Arena
Attendance: 1,399
Referee: Paul Knowles

26 November 2011
15:00

Fylde	28 - 22	Blackheath
	Report

Woodlands Memorial Ground
Attendance: 546
Referee: Tom Davis

26 November 2011
15:00

Macclesfield	15 - 24	Jersey (BP)
	Report

Priory Park
Attendance: 397
Referee: John Meredith

=== Round 15 ===
3 December 2011
14:00

Cinderford	20 - 31	Macclesfield
	Report

Dockham Road
Attendance: 180

3 December 2011
14:00

(BP) Wharfedale	39 - 5	Tynedale
	Report

The Avenue
Attendance: 623
Referee: Greg MacDonald

3 December 2011
14:30

Sedgley Park	23 - 8	Barking
	Report

Park Lane
Attendance: 215
Referee: Richard Kelly

3 December 2011
14:30

(BP) Rosslyn Park	34 - 30	Blaydon (2BP)
	Report

The Rock
Attendance: 342

3 December 2011
15:00

(BP) Blackheath	32 - 5	Birmingham & Solihull
	Report

Rectory Field
Attendance: 634
Referee: Karl Kirkpatrick

3 December 2011
15:00

(BP) Ealing Trailfinders	31 - 29	Fylde (2BP)
	Report

Trailfinders Sports Ground
Attendance: 410
Referee: Philip Davis

3 December 2011
15:00

(BP) Jersey	29 - 3	Coventry
	Report

St Peter
Attendance: 1,506
Referee: Terry Hall

3 December 2011
15:00

(BP) Stourbridge	26 - 18	Cambridge
	Report

Stourton Park
Attendance: 400
Referee: John Meredith

=== Round 16 ===
10 December 2011
14:00

(BP) Cambridge	26 - 28	Blaydon
	Report

Grantchester Road
Attendance: 350
Referee: Terry Hall

10 December 2011
14:00

(BP) Tynedale	61 - 17	Sedgley Park
	Report

Tynedale Park
Attendance: 329
Referee: John Meredith

10 December 2011
14:15

(BP) Rosslyn Park	44 - 13	Barking
	Report

The Rock
Attendance: 525
Referee: Richard Kelly

10 December 2011
15:00

Blackheath	27 - 27	Ealing Trailfinders (BP)
	Report

Rectory Field
Attendance: 857
Referee: Nick Cockburn

10 December 2011
15:00

Birmingham & Solihull	3 - 41	Jersey (BP)
	Report

Damson Park
Attendance: 300
Referee: Andrew Jackson

10 December 2011
15:00

(BP) Coventry	3 - 8	Wharfedale
	Report

Butts Park Arena
Attendance: 1,078
Referee: Jason Bessant

10 December 2011
15:00

(BP) Fylde	37 - 22	Cinderford
	Report

Woodlands Memorial Ground
Attendance: 1,250
Referee: Greg MacDonald

10 December 2011
15:00

Macclesfield	22 - 19	Stourbridge (BP)
	Report

Priory Park
Attendance: 364
Referee: Shane Lewis

=== Round 17 ===
17 December 2011
14:00

(BP) Jersey	32 - 5	Blackheath
	Report

St Peter
Attendance: 1,729
Referee: Paul Knowles

17 December 2011
14:00

Wharfedale	16 - 10	Fylde (BP)
	Report

The Avenue
Attendance: 849
Referee: Steve Lee

17 December 2011
14:30

(BP) Cinderford	40 - 0	Birmingham & Solihull
	Report

Dockham Road
Attendance: 265
Referee: Tom Davis

17 December 2011
14:30

Sedgley Park	8 - 22	Macclesfield
	Report

Park Lane
Attendance: 436
Referee: Ross Campbell

17 December 2011
15:00

(BP) Barking	20 - 22	Cambridge
	Report

Goresbrook
Attendance: 235
Referee: Nick Cockburn

17 December 2011
15:00

(BP) Ealing Trailfinders	22 - 23	Rosslyn Park
	Report

Trailfinders Sports Ground
Attendance: 768
Referee: Michael Tutty

17 December 2011
15:00

Stourbridge	20 - 12	Coventry
	Report

Stourton Park
Attendance: 450
Referee: Darren Gamage

17 December 2011

Blaydon	P - P	Tynedale

- Postponed. Game rescheduled to 17 March 2012.

=== Round 18 ===
7 January 2012
14:00

Birmingham & Solihull	36 - 17	Wharfedale
	Report

Damson Park
Attendance: 257
Referee: John Meredith

7 January 2012
14:00

Ealing Trailfinders	16 - 24	Jersey
	Report

Trailfinders Sports Ground
Attendance: 921
Referee: Darren Gamage

7 January 2012
14:15

(BP) Tynedale	26 - 17	Barking
	Report

Tynedale Park
Attendance: 310
Referee: Marcus Caton

7 January 2012
14:30

(BP) Rosslyn Park	43 - 17	Cambridge
	Report

The Rock
Attendance: 584
Referee: Nick Cockburn

7 January 2012
15:00

(BP) Blackheath	18 - 20	Cinderford
	Report

Rectory Field
Attendance: 833
Referee: Greg MacDonald

7 January 2012
15:00

Coventry	14 - 24	Sedgley Park (BP)
	Report

Butts Park Arena
Attendance: 1,201
Referee: Andrew Jackson

7 January 2012
15:00

(BP) Fylde	31 - 21	Stourbridge
	Report

Woodlands Memorial Ground
Attendance: 622
Referee: Philip Davis

7 January 2012
15:00

Macclesfield	16 - 10	Blaydon (BP)
	Report

Priory Park
Attendance: 350
Referee: Andrew Taylorson

=== Round 19 ===
14 January 2012
14:00

Cambridge	23 - 21	Tynedale (BP)
	Report

Grantchester Road
Attendance: 442
Referee: Greg MacDonald

14 January 2012
14:00

Wharfedale	31 - 30	Blackheath (2BP)
	Report

The Avenue
Attendance: 691
Referee: Andrew Jackson

14 January 2012
14:30

(BP) Cinderford	27 - 24	Ealing Trailfinders (BP)
	Report

Dockham Road
Attendance: 275
Referee: John Meredith

14 January 2012
14:30

Sedgley Park	13 - 29	Fylde (BP)
	Report

Park Lane
Attendance: 523
Referee: Tom Davis

14 January 2012
15:00

Barking	12 - 48	Macclesfield (BP)
	Report

Goresbrook
Attendance: 163
Referee: Karl Kirkpatrick

14 January 2012
15:00

Jersey	20 - 18	Rosslyn Park (BP)
	Report

St Peter
Attendance: 3,648
Referee: Ross Campbell

14 January 2012
15:00

(BP) Stourbridge	17 - 18	Birmingham & Solihull
	Report

Stourton Park
Attendance: 650
Referee: Terry Hall

14 January 2012

Blaydon	P - P	Coventry

- Postponed. Game rescheduled for 25 February 2012.

=== Round 20 ===
21 January 2012
14:00

Birmingham & Solihull	15 - 32	Sedgley Park (BP)
	Report

Damson Park
Attendance: 274
Referee: Shane Lewis

21 January 2012
14:15

Coventry	26 - 14	Barking
	Report

Butts Park Arena
Attendance: 1,121
Referee: Jason Bessant

21 January 2012
14:30

Rosslyn Park	23 - 37	Tynedale (BP)
	Report

The Rock
Attendance: 525
Referee: John Meredith

21 January 2012
15:00

(BP) Blackheath	41 - 27	Stourbridge
	Report

Rectory Field
Attendance: 582
Referee: Tom Davis

21 January 2012
15:00

(BP) Ealing Trailfinders	43 - 17	Wharfedale
	Report

Trailfinders Sports Ground
Attendance: 449
Referee: Richard Kelly

21 January 2012
15:00

Fylde	10 - 34	Blaydon (BP)
	Report

Woodlands Memorial Ground
Attendance: 620
Referee: Marcus Caton

21 January 2012
15:00

Jersey	17 - 12	Cinderford (BP)
	Report

St Peter
Attendance: 2,295
Referee: Nick Cockburn

21 January 2012
15:00

(BP) Macclesfield	43 - 19	Cambridge
	Report

Priory Park
Attendance: 273
Referee: Philip Davis

=== Round 21 ===
28 January 2012
14:00

(BP) Cambridge	35 - 27	Coventry
	Report

Grantchester Road
Attendance: 470
Referee: Richard Kelly

28 January 2012
14:00

(BP) Tynedale	25 - 24	Macclesfield (2BP)
	Report

Tynedale Park
Attendance: 365
Referee: Wayne Falla

28 January 2012
14:00

Wharfedale	14 - 32	Jersey (BP)
	Report

The Avenue
Attendance: 920
Referee: Steve Walsh

28 January 2012
14:15

(BP) Blaydon	47 - 7	Birmingham
	Report

Crow Trees
Attendance: 193
Referee: Andrew Taylorson

28 January 2012
14:30

Cinderford	22 - 12	Rosslyn Park
	Report

Dockham Road
Attendance: 315
Referee: Charles Samson

28 January 2012
14:30

(2BP) Sedgley Park	30 - 37	Blackheath (BP)
	Report

Park Lane
Attendance: 257
Referee: Karl Kirkpatrick

28 January 2012
15:00

Barking	20 - 19	Fylde (BP)
	Report

Goresbrook
Attendance: 189
Referee: Terry Hall

28 January 2012
15:00

Stourbridge	19 - 31	Ealing Trailfinders (BP)
	Report

Stourton Park
Attendance: 450
Referee: Greg MacDonald

=== Round 22 ===
11 February 2012
15:00

(BP) Jersey	44 - 7	Stourbridge
	Report

St Peter
Attendance: 2,207
Referee: Tom Davis

11 February 2012

Blackheath	P - P	Blaydon

- Postponed. Game rescheduled for 6 April 2012.

11 February 2012

Birmingham & Solihull	P - P	Barking

- Postponed. Game rescheduled for 25 February 2012.

11 February 2012

Cinderford	P - P	Wharfedale

- Postponed. Game rescheduled for 25 February 2012.

11 February 2012

Coventry	P - P	Tynedale

- Postponed. Game rescheduled for 7 April 2012.

11 February 2012

Ealing Trailfinders	P - P	Sedgley Park

- Postponed. Game rescheduled for 25 February 2012.

11 February 2012

Fylde	P - P	Cambridge

- Postponed. Game rescheduled for 25 February 2012.

11 February 2012

Rosslyn Park	P - P	Macclesfield

- Postponed. Game rescheduled for 25 February 2012.

=== Round 23 ===
18 February 2012
14:00

Wharfedale	8 - 7	Rosslyn Park (BP)
	Report

The Avenue
Attendance: 683
Referee: Paul Knowles

18 February 2012
14:15

(BP) Barking	23 - 29	Blackheath (BP)
	Report

Goresbrook
Attendance: 287
Referee: Wayne Falla

18 February 2012
14:15

Blaydon	12 - 10	Ealing Trailfinders (BP)
	Report

Crow Trees
Attendance: 235
Referee: Karl Kirkpatrick

18 February 2012
14:30

(BP) Sedgley Park	11 - 13	Jersey
	Report

Park Lane
Attendance: 309
Referee: Andrew Taylorson

18 February 2012
14:30

(BP) Tynedale	17 - 22	Fylde (BP)
	Report

Tynedale Park
Attendance: 425
Referee: Andrew Jackson

18 February 2012
15:00

Cambridge	15 - 30	Birmingham & Solihull (BP)
	Report

Grantchester Road
Attendance: 435
Referee: Michael Tutty

18 February 2012
15:00

(BP) Macclesfield	40 - 10	Coventry
	Report

Priory Park
Attendance: 267
Referee: Marcus Caton

18 February 2012
15:00

(BP) Stourbridge	18 - 25	Cinderford
	Report

Stourton Park
Attendance: 420
Referee: Richard Kelly

=== Rounds 19 & 22 (Rescheduled games) ===
25 February 2012
14:15

(BP) Birmingham & Solihull	38 - 3	Barking
	Report

Damson Park
Attendance: 207
Referee: Philip Davis

- Game rescheduled from 11 February 2012.

25 February 2012
14:15

Blaydon	17 - 17	Coventry
	Report

Crow Trees
Attendance: 156
Referee: Andrew Jackson

- Game rescheduled from 14 January 2012.

25 February 2012
14:30

(BP) Cinderford	31 - 15	Wharfedale
	Report

Dockham Road
Attendance: 310
Referee: G Evans

- Game rescheduled from 11 February 2012

25 February 2012
14:30

Rosslyn Park	19 - 17	Macclesfield (BP)
	Report

The Rock
Attendance: 280
Referee: Nick Cockburn

- Game rescheduled from 11 February 2012.

25 February 2012
15:00

(BP) Ealing Trailfinders	27 - 13	Sedgley Park
	Report

Trailfinders Sports Ground
Attendance: 286
Referee: Andrew Taylorson

- Game rescheduled from 11 February 2012.

25 February 2012
15:00

(BP) Fylde	41 - 26	Cambridge (BP)
	Report

Woodlands Memorial Ground
Attendance: 468
Referee: Tom Davis

- Game rescheduled from 11 February 2012.

=== Round 24 ===
3 March 2012
14:00

Birmingham & Solihull	16 - 14	Tynedale (BP)
	Report

Damson Park
Attendance: 207
Referee: J Matthews

3 March 2012
14:00

(BP) Cinderford	32 - 12	Sedgley Park
	Report

Dockham Road
Attendance: 330
Referee: Shane Lewis

3 March 2012
14:30

Rosslyn Park	19 - 19	Coventry
	Report

The Rock
Attendance: 420
Referee: Matt Carley

3 March 2012
15:00

(BP) Blackheath	48 - 33	Cambridge (BP)
	Report

Rectory Field
Attendance: 671
Referee: Richard Kelly

3 March 2012
15:00

(BP) Ealing Trailfinders	59 - 34	Barking (BP)
	Report

Trailfinders Sports Ground
Attendance: 320
Referee: Greg MacDonald

3 March 2012
15:00

(BP) Fylde	48 - 23	Macclesfield
	Report

Woodlands Memorial Ground
Attendance: 324
Referee: Wayne Falla

3 March 2012
15:00

(BP) Jersey	28 - 7	Blaydon
	Report

St Peter
Attendance: 3,128
Referee: Philip Davis

3 March 2012
15:00

(BP) Wharfedale	40 - 5	Stourbridge
	Report

The Avenue
Attendance: 639
Referee: Steve Lee

=== Round 25 ===
9 March 2012
19:30

(BP) Macclesfield	28 - 37	Birmingham & Solihull (BP)
	Report

Priory Park
Attendance: 410
Referee: Andrew Taylorson

10 March 2012
14:30

(BP) Blaydon	31 - 24	Cinderford (BP)
	Report

Crow Trees
Attendance: 230
Referee: John Meredith

10 March 2012
14:30

Sedgley Park	22 - 19	Wharfedale (BP)
	Report

Park Lane
Attendance: 320
Referee: Greg MacDonald

10 March 2012
15:00

Barking	22 - 20	Jersey (BP)
	Report

Goresbrook
Attendance: 307
Referee: Nick Cockburn

10 March 2012
15:00

(BP) Cambridge	37 - 63	Ealing Trailfinders (BP)
	Report

Grantchester Road
Attendance: 446
Referee: Tom Foley

10 March 2012
15:00

(BP) Coventry	39 - 26	Fylde (BP)
	Report

Butts Park Arena
Attendance: 1,009
Referee: Marcus Caton

10 March 2012
15:00

(BP) Stourbridge	22 - 25	Rosslyn Park (BP)
	Report

Stourton Park
Attendance: 350
Referee: Tom Davis

10 March 2012
15:00

Tynedale	17 - 34	Blackheath (BP)
	Report

Tynedale Park
Attendance: 367
Referee: Karl Kirkpatrick

=== Round 17 (Rescheduled game) ===
17 March 2012
14:00

(BP) Blaydon	25 - 19	Tynedale (BP)
	Report

Crow Trees
Attendance: 652
Referee: Darren Gamage

- Rescheduled from 17 December 2011.

=== Round 26 ===
24 March 2012
15:00

(BP) Blackheath	41 - 27	Macclesfield (BP)
	Report

Rectory Field
Attendance: 617
Referee: Tom Foley

24 March 2012
15:00

(BP) Birmingham & Solihull	25 - 26	Coventry
	Report

Damson Park
Attendance: 890
Referee: Shane Lewis

24 March 2012
15:00

(BP) Cinderford	39 - 18	Barking
	Report

Dockham Road
Attendance: 300
Referee: Karl Kirkpatrick

24 March 2012
15:00

(BP) Ealing Trailfinders	56 - 15	Tynedale
	Report

Trailfinders Sports Ground
Attendance: 352
Referee: Simon Harding

24 March 2012
15:00

(BP) Jersey	51 - 14	Cambridge
	Report

St Peter
Attendance: 2,628
Referee: Andrew Jackson

24 March 2012
15:00

Rosslyn Park	24 - 44	Fylde (BP)
	Report

The Rock
Attendance: 630
Referee: Terry Hall

24 March 2012
15:00

(BP) Stourbridge	33 - 29	Sedgley Park (2BP)
	Report

Stourton Park
Attendance: 450
Referee: Philip Davis

24 March 2012
15:00

(BP) Wharfedale	34 - 3	Blaydon
	Report

The Avenue
Attendance: 597
Referee: Andrew Taylorson

=== Round 27 ===
31 March 2012
14:30

(BP) Blaydon	32 - 20	Stourbridge
	Report

Crow Trees
Attendance: 152
Referee: Simon Harding

31 March 2012
14:30

Sedgley Park	30-29	Rosslyn Park (2BP)
	Report

Park Lane
Attendance: 226
Referee: Shane Lewis

31 March 2012
15:00

(BP) Barking	42 - 24	Wharfedale (BP)
	Report

Goresbrook
Attendance: 101
Referee: Terry Hall

31 March 2012
15:00

(BP) Cambridge	25 - 20	Cinderford (BP)
	Report

Grantchester Road
Attendance: 467
Referee: Rob Warburton

31 March 2012
15:00

Coventry	23 - 36	Blackheath (BP)
	Report

Butts Park Arena
Attendance: 1,167
Referee: John Meredith

31 March 2012
15:00

(BP) Fylde	45 - 24	Birmingham & Solihull (BP)
	Report

Woodlands Memorial Ground
Attendance: 644
Referee: Richard Kelly

31 March 2012
15:00

(BP) Macclesfield	34 - 34	Ealing Trailfinders (BP)
	Report

Priory Park
Attendance: 357
Referee: Andrew Jackson

31 March 2012
15:00

Tynedale	0 - 64	Jersey (BP)
	Report

Tynedale Park
Attendance: 580
Referee: Greg MacDonald

=== Rounds 22 (Rescheduled games) ===
6 April 2012
14:00

(BP) Blackheath	45 - 22	Blaydon (BP)
	Report

Rectory Field
Attendance: 735
Referee: Philip Davis

- Rescheduled from 11 February 2012.

7 April 2012
15:00

Coventry	25 - 24	Tynedale (BP)
	Report

Butts Park Arena
Attendance: 749
Referee: Terry Hall

- Rescheduled from 11 February 2012.

=== Round 28 ===
14 April 2012
14:30

(BP) Rosslyn Park	34 - 19	Birmingham & Solihull
	Report

The Rock
Attendance: 485
Referee: Andrew Jackson

14 April 2012
14:30

Sedgley Park	19 - 41	Blaydon (BP)
	Report

Park Lane
Attendance: 571
Referee: Tom Foley

14 April 2012
15:00

(BP) Blackheath	59 - 24	Fylde (BP)
	Report

Rectory Field
Attendance: 843
Referee: Simon Harding

14 April 2012
15:00

(BP) Cinderford	43 - 14	Tynedale
	Report

Dockham Road
Attendance: 285
Referee: Shane Lewis

14 April 2012
15:00

(BP) Ealing Trailfinders	55 - 33	Coventry (BP)
	Report

Trailfinders Sports Ground
Attendance: 402
Referee: Richard Kelly

14 April 2012
15:00

(BP) Jersey	39 - 0	Macclesfield
	Report

St Peter
Attendance: 2,374
Referee: Andrew Taylorson

14 April 2012
15:00

(BP) Stourbridge	29 - 22	Barking (2BP)
	Report

Stourton Park

14 April 2012
15:00

(BP) Wharfedale	31 - 24	Cambridge (BP)
	Report

The Avenue
Attendance: 596
Referee: Karl Kirkpatrick

=== Round 29 ===
21 April 2012
14:30

Blaydon	21 - 8	Rosslyn Park
	Report

Crow Trees
Attendance: 185
Referee: Karl Kirkpatrick

21 April 2012
15:00

(2BP) Barking	26 - 30	Sedgley Park
	Report

Goresbrook
Attendance: 163
Referee: Shane Lewis

21 April 2012
15:00

(BP) Birmingham & Solihull	27 - 38	Blackheath (BP)
	Report

Damson Park
Attendance: 207
Referee: Philip Davis

21 April 2012
15:00

(BP) Cambridge	40 - 26	Stourbridge (BP)
	Report

Grantchester Road
Attendance: 580
Referee: Simon Harding

21 April 2012
15:00

Coventry	13 - 37	Jersey (BP)
	Report

Butts Park Arena
Attendance: 1,643
Referee: Nick Cockburn

21 April 2012
15:00

Fylde	22 - 22	Ealing Trailfinders (BP)
	Report

Woodlands Memorial Ground
Attendance: 1,204
Referee: Steve Lee

21 April 2012
15:00

(BP) Macclesfield	35 - 31	Cinderford (2BP)
	Report

Priory Park
Attendance: 317
Referee: Tom Davis

21 April 2012
15:00

Tynedale	23 - 20	Wharfedale (BP)
	Report

Tynedale Park
Attendance: 398
Referee: Marcus Caton

=== Round 30 ===
28 April 2012
14:30

(BP) Sedgley Park	41 - 36	Cambridge (2BP)
	Report

Park Lane
Attendance: 527
Referee: Wayne Falla

28 April 2012
15:00

(BP) Blackheath	24 - 10	Rosslyn Park
	Report

Rectory Field
Attendance: 1,473
Referee: Ross Campbell

28 April 2012
15:00

(BP) Blaydon	56 - 7	Barking
	Report

Crow Trees
Attendance: 185
Referee: Andrew Taylorson

28 April 2012
15:00

(BP) Cinderford	44 - 0	Coventry
	Report

Dockham Road
Attendance: 370
Referee: Marcus Caton

28 April 2012
15:00

(BP) Ealing Trailfinders	42 - 5	Birmingham & Solihull
	Report

Trailfinders Sports Ground
Attendance: 487
Referee: Terry Hall

28 April 2012
15:00

Jersey	23 - 8	Fylde
	Report

St Peter
Attendance: 3,454
Referee: Darren Gamage

28 April 2012
15:00

Stourbridge	14 - 22	Tynedale (BP)
	Report

Stourton Park
Attendance: 400
Referee: Karl Kirkpatrick

28 April 2012
15:00

(BP) Wharfedale	44 - 19	Macclesfield
	Report

The Avenue
Attendance: 729
Referee: Andrew Jackson

== Total season attendances ==
Club	Home Games	Total	Average	Highest	Lowest	% Capacity
Barking	15	2,695	180	307	101	18%
Birmingham & Solihull	15	4,686	312	890	207	10%
Blackheath	15	10,809	721	1,473	437	21%
Blaydon	15	3,879	259	652	152	13%
Cambridge	15	6,694	446	580	300	20%
Cinderford	15	4,687	312	436	180	12%
Coventry	15	15,717	1,048	1,643	745	26%
Ealing Trailfinders	15	6,821	455	921	170	15%
Fylde	15	11,326	755	1,250	324	10%
Jersey	15	33,096	2,206	3,648	1,262	44%
Macclesfield	15	4,789	319	410	205	26%
Rosslyn Park	15	6,626	442	630	280	22%
Sedgley Park	15	4,991	333	571	187	11%
Stourbridge	14 (Note: Missing attendance: 14 April 2012 v Barking.)	6,270	448	650	350	13%
Tynedale	15	5,987	399	580	310	20%
Wharfedale	15	9,899	660	920	507	33%

== Individual statistics ==
- Note if players are tied on tries or points the player with the lowest number of appearances will come first. Also note that points scorers includes tries as well as conversions, penalties and drop goals.

=== Top points scorers ===
Rank	Player	Team	Appearances	Points
1	(England) Rory Teague	Cinderford	27	254
2	(Scotland) Ross Laidlaw	Rosslyn Park	24	232
3	(England) Mark Woodrow	Stourbridge / Birmingham & Solihull	27	215
4	(England) Phil Chesters	Ealing Trailfinders	29	210
5	(England) Andrew Baggett	Blaydon	26	208
6	(Jersey) Michael Le Bourgeois	Jersey	23	197
7	(England) Ross Winney	Macclesfield	23	193
8	(England) Matt Riley	Sedgley Park	29	181
9	(England) Ross Broadfoot	Jersey	23	179
10	(England) Ben Ward	Ealing Trailfinders	24	177

=== Top try scorers ===
Rank	Player	Team	Appearances	Tries
1	(England) Phil Chesters	Ealing Trailfinders	29	42
2	(England) Oliver Brennand	Flyde	29	27
3	(England) Nick Royle	Flyde	22	25
3	(England) David Allen	Blackheath	26	25
4	(England) Owen Bruynseels	Ealing Trailfinders	27	20
5	(England) Nevard Codlin	Cinderford	25	19
5	(England) James Stephenson	Blackheath	25	19
6	(England) Nathan Bressington	Stourbridge	25	18
6	(England) Daniel Solomi	Wharfedale	28	18
7	(England) Charlie Mulchrone	Macclesfield	22	17

== Season records ==
=== Team ===
Largest home win — 49 pts

56 - 7 Blaydon at home to Barking on 28 April 2012

Largest away win — 64 pts

64 - 0 Jersey away to Tynedale on 31 March 2012

Most points scored — 64

64 - 0 Jersey away to Tynedale on 31 March 2012

Most tries in a match — 10

Jersey away to Tynedale on 31 March 2012

Most conversions in a match — 8 (x2)

Tynedale at home to Sedgley Park on 10 December 2011
Blaydon at home to Barking on 28 April 2012

Most penalties in a match — 6 (x2)

Cambridge at home to Macclesfield on 1 October 2011
Birmingham & Solihull away to Stourbridge on 14 January 2012

Most drop goals in a match — 2

Wharfedale at home to Jersey on 28 January 2012

=== Player ===
Most points in a match — 26

(England) Michael Le Bourgeois for Jersey at home to Barking on 5 November 2011

Most tries in a match — 5

(England) Nick Royle for Fylde at home to Cambridge on 25 February 2012

Most conversions in a match — 8

(England) Andrew Baggett for Blaydon at home to Barking on 28 April 2012

Most penalties in a match — 6 (x2)

(England) Tom Wheatcroft for Cambridge at home to Macclesfield on 1 October 2011
(England) Mark Woodrow for Birmingham & Solihull away to Stourbridge on 14 January 2012

Most drop goals in a match — 2

(England) Tom Barrett for Wharfedale at home to Jersey on 28 January 2012

=== Attendances ===
Highest — 3,648

Jersey at home to Rosslyn Park on 14 January 2012

Lowest — 101

Barking at home to Rosslyn Park on 3 September 2011

Highest Average Attendance — 2,206

Jersey

Lowest Average Attendance — 180

Barking

== See also ==
- English Rugby Union Leagues
- English rugby union system
- Rugby union in England
