= Andrew Baggett =

English rugby union footballer

- Born: Andrew Baggett; 25 January 1982 (age 44) Middlesbrough, North Yorkshire, England
- Height: 1.79 m (5 ft 10 in)
- Weight: 198 lb (90 kg)
- School: Laurence Jackson School, Prior Pursglove College
- University: Teesside University

Rugby union career
- Position: Fly-half
- Current team: Middlesbrough
Youth career
- -: Guisborough
- –: Middlesbrough
Senior career
Years	Team	Apps	(Points)
2000–2001	Middlesbrough		
2001–2008	Wharfedale	188	(429)
2008–2017	Blaydon	231	(1,292)
2017–	Middlesbrough		
- Correct as of 29 April 2017

Andrew Baggett (born 25 January 1982) is an English rugby union footballer who plays at fly-half. Currently coach at Middlesbrough, Baggett is best known for his spells with Wharfedale and Blaydon where he became the National League 1 all-time top scorer with 1,707 points. As well as playing club rugby Baggett has represented Yorkshire and Durham in the County Championships, and was part of the Yorkshire squad that won the Bill Beaumont Cup in 2008.

== Career ==
=== Early career ===
Baggett was born in Middlesbrough on the 25 January 1982. He grew up in Guisborough where he attended the Laurence Jackson School, whist playing junior rugby union for his local club (Guisborough RUFC). During this time he joined Middlesbrough RUFC to play and was selected to represent Yorkshire at U16, U17 and U18 levels. After school he then attended Prior Pursglove College (sixth form) and upon leaving school in 2000 he enrolled at Teesside University whilst progressing to play senior rugby for Middlesbrough RUFC, mixing his studies with league rugby union in North 1. A promising youth player, Baggett was also selected for the England under-18 squad during this period.

=== Wharfedale ===
In 2001 Baggett signed for Wharfedale, playing two divisions higher than Middlesbrough in National Division 2 - the third division of English rugby union. Despite the jump up in leagues, he went straight into the first team, making his league debut on 1 September in a 15–18 loss to Rosslyn Park at Threshfield. He would go on to make 25 league appearances for Dale in his debut season, scoring 4 tries, as the North Yorkshire club finished 9th in the table.

The next couple of seasons would follow a similar tend with Baggett being a first team regular in a side that would finish in 9th and 10th place in the league, contributing several tries and acting as back-up kicker for first choice Jonathon Davies. The 2004–05 season would be a pivotal one for Baggett as he was made captain aged just 22, due to club stalwart Andrew Hodgson being unavailable due to injury. Under his captaincy Dale finished in a respectable 8th place in what was a strong league featuring clubs such as the up-and-coming Doncaster as well as great old clubs such Moseley and Waterloo. His club also had a decent run in the Powergen Cup, reaching the 4th round where they went out to Pertemps Bees, losing 14–24 at home to the side that would go to record that historic upset win against Wasps. Baggett's spell as captain brought him to the attention of Yorkshire and in the summer of 2005 he was called up to play in the County Championships.

Wharfedale would continue to improve in the league, becoming a top half side with 5th and 6th-place finishes between 2005 and 2007. Although the arrival of Mark Bedworth from Darlington Mowden Park in the summer of 2005 meant that Baggett would remain as back-up kicker, he still proved to be reliable with the boot contributing 101 points including 6 tries during the 2006–07 season. 2007-08 would be the best of Baggett's career so far, scoring 168 points (seventh overall in the league) as Wharfedale finished in 7th. He would also be called up to the Yorkshire county side in the summer, being part of the squad that went on to win the 2008 Bill Beaumont Cup with a comprehensive 33–13 win over Devon at Twickenham Stadium.

=== Blaydon ===
Following Yorkshire's triumph in the summer of 2008, Baggett signed for Blaydon, having spent seven years with Wharfedale where he had made 188 appearances and scored over 400 points. This came as something of a surprise to some supporters as he was starting to enjoy his best form with Dale, while Blaydon had struggled in National Division Two, finishing just outside of the relegation spot the previous season. Baggett made his league debut for Blaydon on 6 September 2008, scoring 16 points from the boot as his side won 46–8 away to Waterloo. After a good first half to the season, Baggett suffered several injuries in the new year, restricted him to 16 league appearances and 79 points. Despite losing a key player, Blaydon managed to hang on to their league status with a consecutive 11th-place finish keeping them safe from relegation. By the end of the season Baggett had recovered sufficiently to be called up for Yorkshire once more for the 2009 County Championships, although they were unable to reclaim their title.

2009-10 would be more settled for Baggett as he resumed his place in the Blaydon side, making 27 appearances and contributing 147 points (including a career best 10 tries) as his team improved massively to finish in 7th place in the newly named National League 1. Personal highlights of the season included a personal tally of 45 points in one game when Blaydon hammered relegated Manchester 140–0 in the last fixture of the campaign. The following season continued in much same vein, with another 28 league appearances and 148 points ensuring that Blaydon finished in 10th place.

The 2011–12 season would see Baggett start to hit the richest form of his career. He was excellent for Blaydon as they rose to 7th in the league, and his contribution of 208 points made him the 5th highest points scorer in the division. After a number of seasons of representing Yorkshire, Baggett switched to Durham County, representing them at the 2012 County Championships. The following year was even better as Blaydon reached the lofty heights of 3rd in the league, finishing above clubs such as Coventry and Richmond. Baggett once more played a key role with a career best of 238 points (seventh overall in the league) helping his club to a top 3 finish. He was also recalled by Durham as part of their squad taking part in the 2013 Bill Beaumont Cup, although the achievements of Blaydon were not replicated as his county were relegated at the end of the competition.

Between 2013 and 2015 Baggett would continue to be a regular starter and scorer with Blaydon as his team claimed top half league finishes. Blaydon's good form started to dip during the 2015–16 season as they sunk to an 11th place league finish, with Baggett only managing 71 points despite making 29 starts. By the 2016–17 season, Baggett was no longer considered a first time regular and both he and his club struggled throughout the campaign. Ultimately Blaydon would end up being relegated in 15th place, having spent 10 seasons in National League 1. Despite experiencing disappointment at club level, Baggett was still seen as an important player for Durham, and was selected to take part in the 2017 County Championship Plate.

=== Middlesbrough ===
In the summer of 2017, following seven seasons with Blaydon in which he became the National League 1 all-time top scorer, Baggett decided to leave the relegated Crow Trees side to join former club Middlesbrough, playing four divisions lower in Yorkshire 1, becoming player-coach.

== Season-by-season playing stats ==
Season	Club	Competition	Appearances	Tries	Drop Goals	Conversions	Penalties	Total Points
2000-01	Middlesbrough	North Division One						
2001-02	Wharfedale	National Division Two	25	4	0	1	0	22
2002-03	Wharfedale	National Division Two	26	5	3	2	7	59
2002-03	Wharfedale	Powergen Cup	1	1	0	0	0	5
2003-04	Wharfedale	National Division Two	26	3	0	0	0	15
2003-04	Wharfedale	Powergen Cup	3	0	0	0	0	0
2004-05	Wharfedale	National Division Two	23	4	0	0	0	20
2004-05	Wharfedale	Powergen Cup	1	0	0	0	0	0
2005-06	Wharfedale	National Division Two	25	6	0	0	0	30
2005-06	Wharfedale	Powergen National Trophy	2	0	0	0	0	0
2006-07	Wharfedale	National Division Two	26	6	0	19	11	101
2006-07	Wharfedale	EDF Energy Trophy	2	0	0	0	0	0
2007-08	Wharfedale	National Division Two	26	3	0	39	25	168
2007-08	Wharfedale	EDF Energy Trophy	2	1	0	2	0	9
2008-09	Blaydon	National Division Two	16	2	1	21	8	79
2009-10	Blaydon	National League 1	27	10	0	41	5	147
2010-11	Blaydon	National League 1	28	5	0	41	13	146
2011-12	Blaydon	National League 1	26	3	0	65	21	208
2012-13	Blaydon	National League 1	26	5	0	69	25	238
2013-14	Blaydon	National League 1	28	1	0	58	23	190
2014-15	Blaydon	National League 1	27	2	0	45	16	148
2015-16	Blaydon	National League 1	29	0	0	22	9	71
2016-17	Blaydon	National League 1	24	2	0	17	7	65
2017-18	Middlesbrough	Yorkshire 1						

== Honours and records ==
National League 1

- National League 1 record all-time top points scorer (1,707 points)
- National League 1 record all-time most appearances (409 appearances)

Yorkshire

- Represented Yorkshire senior side
  - County Championship winners: 2008

Durham County

- Represented Durham County senior side
