= Michael Le Bourgeois =

- Born: Michael Le Bourgeois; 29 July 1990 (age 36) Jersey
- Height: 6 ft 1 in (1.85 m)
- Weight: 87 kg (192 lb)

Rugby union career
- Position: Centre/Fullback/Fly-half
- Current team: Bedford Blues
Senior career
Years	Team	Apps	(Points)
2008–2013	Jersey	116	(891)
2013–2018	Bedford Blues	48	(73)
2018–2022	Wasps	42	(0)
2022-	Bedford Blues	99	(100)
- Correct as of 3 Jul 2024

Michael Le Bourgeois (born 29 July 1990) is a Jerseyman professional rugby union player who plays for Championship side, Bedford Blues as a centre and can also play as a fullback or as a fly-half.

== Career ==
Le Bourgeois broke into rugby through Jersey's academy, making his debut in 2008 when Jersey were promoted to London 1 from London 2 South. In June 2011, Le Bourgeois became the first Jersey academy graduate and the first Jersey born player to sign a professional contract with Jersey. He was the top point scorer for Jersey in National League 1 for the 2011-2012 season as Jersey were promoted to the Championship. In addition, Le Bourgeois was also listed as one of the top ten kickers in National League 1 along with fellow Jersey player, Ross Broadfoot. Later in 2012, he scored Jersey's first Championship try at Headingley Stadium against Leeds Carnegie.

In April 2013, Le Bourgeois left Jersey to move to Bedford Blues. His time at Jersey was the most successful period in the club's history, scoring 891 points in league and British & Irish Cup matches and seeing the club rise from tier 5 all the way to the second division.

Le Bourgeois has also previously been selected to represent the Hampshire Rugby Football Union in the County Championship. When Jersey were promoted from level five of the English rugby union system, Le Bourgeois became ineligible to represent Hampshire.

In 2018, Le Bourgeois signed for Premiership club Wasps, and in December 2019 it was announced he had re-signed on a new contract following good performances in the number 12 shirt for Wasps since signing.

== Personal life ==
In Jersey, Le Bourgeois is viewed as a role model. In August 2011, Le Bourgeois was arrested for drink-driving, theft of a vehicle, driving without insurance and driving without a valid driving licence. He was banned from driving for 23 months and fined £1,600. He was also banned by Jersey for one match which meant he did not play for Jersey against Birmingham & Solihull R.F.C. Afterwards, he apologised for his actions.

== Honours ==
Jersey

- Siam Cup winners (3 times): 2009, 2011, 2013
- National 3 Champions Cup winners: 2009-10
- National League 3 London & SE champions: 2009-10
- National League 2 (north v south) promotion playoff winners: 2010–11
- National League 1 champions: 2011–12
