= David Allen (rugby union) =

English rugby union player

- Born: 29 April 1981 (age 45) Hildenborough, Kent
- School: Hugh Christie Technology College

Rugby union career
- Position: Openside Flanker
Youth career
- 1986-97: Sevenoaks
Senior career
Years	Team	Apps	(Points)
1998-99	Old Juddians		
1999-04	Tonbridge Juddians		
2004-16	Blackheath	280	(735)
- Correct as of 29 April 2017
International career
Years	Team	Apps	(Points)
2007, 2011-13	England Counties XV	8	(5)
2007	Barbarians	1	(0)

David Allen (born 29 April 1981) is a retired English rugby union player who spent the majority of his career at Blackheath, where his position was openside flanker. While at 'Club' Allen become the all-time try scorer in National League 1 history with 147 tries from 274 appearances. As well as playing for Blackheath he was also capped by England Counties XV and the Barbarians.

== Career ==
=== Early career ===
David Allen was born on the 29 April 1981 in Hildenborough in Kent, England. Growing up he attended Hugh Christie Technology College in Tonbridge, while his youth rugby was spent at nearby Sevenoaks RFC, who he joined at six and played for until he was seventeen (colts). In 1998 he decided to leave Sevenoaks to join his father's old team, Old Juddians to start his senior career. Although Old Juddians would merge with Tonbridge RFC the following seasons to form Tonbridge Juddians, Allen would stay at the club for six seasons, playing lower league rugby in the London regional divisions.

=== 2005-08: First seasons at Blackheath ===
Allen's performances for Tonbridge Juddians came to the attention of south-London side Blackheath, playing fours divisions higher in National Division 2. Despite his coaches' warnings that he would never make it at a higher level, Allen decided to join Blackheath, signing for the 2004–05 season. He made his competitive debut on 18 September 2004, as the club drew 13–13 with Launceston at the Rectory Field. He would go on to play 13 games in his first season, scoring 1 try as Blackheath finished in 9th position. The following season would play out the much same way, Allen becoming a regular in a mid-table Blackheath season that finished once again in 9th place.

The 2006–07 season was when Allen would start to come to prominence. Starring for a Blackheath side that would improve to a fifth-place finish in the league, Allen's performances saw him selected by the England Counties XV and he made his Counties debut on 23 February 2007, starting in a 17–20 loss away to an Irish Club XV in Dublin. A second England Counties cap would follow that year as he scored a try in a 41–10 win over France Amateurs at the Rectory Field on 16 March 2007. Allen's good form would continue for Blackheath the following season, scoring 9 tries as he helped Blackheath to finish fourth in the league. He was also called back to the England Counties side taking part in FIRA/AER Rugby Festival held in France throughout September, and featured in wins against Russia (76-10) and Spain (21-15). A further honour that season was Allen being called up for the Barbarians, playing in a 24–27 loss to Combined Services at Brickfields in Plymouth on 14 November 2007.

=== 2009-12: Try scoring prominence ===
The 2009–10 season would see Allen to start to demonstrate the prolific try scoring form that would characterise his later career at Blackheath. While the previous year had only seen him score 3 league tries all season, he had already eclipsed this figure in his first four games of the new campaign in National League 1 (formerly National 2), including his first ever club hat-trick as his team hammered Manchester 82–0 at home. Allen's form continued throughout the season, contributing 17 tries from just 21 league appearances, including braces against Otley, Manchester and Redruth, as Blackheath finished in 8th place. 2010-11 would follow in much the same vein as Allen scored another 17 tries to finish as Blackheath's top try scorer that year - a figure which included early season hat-tricks against Stourbridge and Macclesfield - as Blackheath improved to 6th place. This prolific scoring form saw Allen return to the England Counties fold, gaining his fifth cap on 18 March 2011, as Counties went down 8–16 to an Irish Club XV in Dublin.

The 2011–12 season was to be Allen's most prolific of his senior career. While in previous seasons he tended to score in batches, this campaign he was consistent throughout, and would finish as Blackheath's top try scorer (and joint third in the division tied with Nick Royle) with 25 tries as Blackheath finished in an impressive third in what was a very competitive National League 1 that featured the likes of Jersey and Ealing Trailfinders. Allen's 25 tries featured a hat-trick against Barking along with braces against seven other sides. Unsurprisingly he was also recalled by England Counties, featuring in a 34–16 win over an Irish Club XV at Preston on 16 March 2012. After the successes of 2011-12 Blackheath would struggle in National League 1 dropping down to 10th place. Despite his teams change in fortunes, Allen was still prolific, finishing once more as Blackheath's top try scorer, this time with 19 tries - joint fourth in the division. In February 2013, Allen picked the last of his England Counties caps, appearing in the 20 - 30 loss to an Irish Club XV in Cork on the 8th and 27 – 7 win over France Federale in Ealing on the 22nd.

=== 2013-15: Last seasons with club ===
Between 2013 and 2015 Allen appeared and scored regularly in a mid-table Blackheath side, finishing as joint second highest scorer at the end of 2013–14 season with 20 tries (2 behind top scorer, Tyson Lewis). The 2015–16 season was to be the penultimate of Allen's career and would be a notable one for Blackheath as it was their last playing at the legendary Rectory Field having spent the past 158 years there. Blackheath played some good rugby throughout the campaign, at one point looking like they might challenge for the title and promotion to the RFU Championship but in the end finished in 3rd spot behind champions Richmond and Hartpury College. Allen also had a good season, finish as Blackheath's top try scorer with 18 tries and joint 6th overall in the division. It would be his last proper season and although he played 3 games in 2016-17 as Blackheath entered a new era at Well Hall, he decided to call it a day and retire after 13 years at Club.

== Season-by-season playing stats ==
=== Club ===
Season	Club	Competition	Appearances	Tries	Drop goals	Conversions	Penalties	Total points
1998-99	Old Juddians (Note: Allen started his senior career with Old Juddians and would stay with the club as they merged with Tonbridge RFC to form Tonbridge Juddians in 1999.)	London 2 South						
1999-00	Tonbridge Juddians	London 3 South East						
2000-01	Tonbridge Juddians	London 3 South East						
2001-02	Tonbridge Juddians	London 3 South East						
2002-03	Tonbridge Juddians	London 3 South East						
2002-03	Tonbridge Juddians	London 3 South East						
2003-04	Tonbridge Juddians	London 3 South East						
2004-05	Blackheath	National Division 2	14	1	0	0	0	5
2005-06	Blackheath	National Division 2	21	1	0	0	0	5
2005-06	Blackheath	EDF Energy Trophy	1	0	0	0	0	0
2006-07	Blackheath	National Division 2	21	4	0	0	0	20
2007-08	Blackheath	National Division 2	23	9	0	0	0	45
2007-08	Blackheath	EDF Energy Trophy	2	0	0	0	0	0
2008-09	Blackheath	National Division 2	23	3	0	0	0	15
2009-10	Blackheath	National League 1	21	17	0	0	0	85
2010-11	Blackheath	National League 1	25	17	0	0	0	85
2011-12	Blackheath	National League 1	26	25	0	0	0	125
2012-13	Blackheath	National League 1	26	19	0	0	0	95
2013-14	Blackheath	National League 1	28	20	0	0	0	100
2014-15	Blackheath	National League 1	20	13	0	0	0	65
2015-16	Blackheath	National League 1	26	18	0	0	0	90
2016-17	Blackheath	National League 1	3	0	0	0	0	0

=== County/representative ===
Season	Side	Competition	Appearances	Tries	Drop goals	Conversions	Penalties	Total points
2006-07	England Counties XV	Test matches	2	1	0	0	0	5
2006-07	Barbarians	Test match	1	0	0	0	0	0
2007-08	England Counties XV	FIRA/AER Rugby Festival, France	2	0	0	0	0	0
2010-11	England Counties XV	Test matches	1	0	0	0	0	0
2011-12	England Counties XV	Test matches	1	0	0	0	0	0
2012-13	England Counties XV	Test matches	2	0	0	0	0	0

== Honours and records ==
Blackheath

- National League 1 all-time top try scorer: 147 tries

England Counties XV

- Capped by England Counties XV: 2013
