= National League 1 =

Rugby union competition in England

- Founded: 1987; 39 years ago
- Country: England
- Number of clubs: 14
- Level on pyramid: Level 3
- Promotion to: RFU Championship
- Relegation to: National Two East; National Two North; National Two West
- Current champions: Rotherham Titans (1st title) (2025-26)
- Most championships: Richmond (4 titles)
- Website: National League 1
- Current: 2026–27 National League 1

National One, up until 2023 known as National League 1 and previously known before September 2009 as National Division Two), is the third of three national men’s leagues in the domestic rugby union competition of England. It was known as Courage League National Division Three when it was founded in 1987. Richmond are the current champions.

The Rugby Football Union (RFU) approved a new structure for the National Leagues from the 2022–23 season. This division was reduced to fourteen teams, playing each other on a home and away basis to make a total of 26 matches each.

== Structure ==
The league consists of fourteen teams, with all the teams playing each other on a home and away basis, to make a total of twenty-six matches each. For the 2025–26 season there is one automatic promotion place, with the champions going up to Champ Rugby, while the runners up will play the 13th placed Champ Rugby side in a playoff for a possible second promotion place.

Clubs finishing 12th, 13th and 14th will automatically be relegated to either, National League 2 East, National League 2 North or National League 2 West, depending on the geographical location of the team. The 11th placed side will enter a four team playoff with the runners up of the three tier 4 leagues, with one side going up/remaining in National League 1.

The results of the matches contribute points to the league table as follows:

- 4 points are awarded for a win
- 2 points are awarded for a draw
- 0 points are awarded for a loss, however
- 1 losing (bonus) point is awarded to a team that loses a match by 7 points or fewer
- 1 additional (bonus) point is awarded to a team scoring 4 tries or more in a match.

== Participating teams and locations ==
2026–27 National 1 teams in England
2026–27 Greater London National League 1 clubs

Team	Ground	Capacity	City/Area	Previous season
Birmingham Moseley	Billesley Common	5,000 (1,300 seats)	Birmingham, West Midlands	11th
Bishop's Stortford	Silver Leys	1,600	Bishop's Stortford, Hertfordshire	6th
Bury St Edmunds	The Haberden	3,000 (135 seats)	Bury St Edmunds, Suffolk	Promoted from National 2 East
Cambridge	Grantchester Road	2,200 (200 seats)	Cambridge, Cambridgeshire	Relegated from Champ Rugby (14th)
Camborne	Recreation Ground	7,000 (780 seats)	Camborne, Cornwall	Promoted from National 2 West
Dings Crusaders	Shaftesbury Park	2,250 (250 seats)	Frenchay, Bristol	10th
Leeds Tykes	The Sycamores (Note: Leeds Tykes will also play one home game at the 19,700 capacity Headingley Stadium in Leeds.)	1,500	Bramhope, Leeds, West Yorkshire	9th
London Scottish	Athletic Ground	4,500 (1,000 seats)	Richmond, London	Relegated from Champ Rugby (13th)
Plymouth Albion	The Brickfields	8,400	Plymouth, Devon	3rd
Rams	Old Bath Road	2,000 (300 seats)	Sonning, Reading, Berkshire	7th
Rosslyn Park	The Rock	2,000 (630 seats)	Roehampton, London	4th
Sale FC	Heywood Road	3,387	Sale, Greater Manchester	5th
Sheffield	Abbeydale Park	3,300 (100 seats)	Sheffield, South Yorkshire	Promoted from National 2 North
Tonbridge Juddians	The Slade (Note: Tonbridge Juddians occasionally play home games at their 4G training pitch at Vizard (owned by The Judd School) in the event of flooding at their regular ground The Slade.)	1,500	Tonbridge, Kent	8th

=== League table ===
2026–27 National League 1 table
Pos	Team	Pld	W	D	L	PF	PA	PD	TB	LB	Pts	Qualification
1	Plymouth Albion	9	9	0	0	471	151	+320	9	0	45	Promotion place
2	Tonbridge Juddians	9	8	0	1	368	316	+52	9	0	41	Promotion play-off
3	Camborne	9	8	0	1	378	272	+106	8	0	40	Promotion play-off
4	Leeds Tykes	9	6	0	3	324	239	+85	7	3	34	
5	Sale FC	9	6	0	3	375	264	+111	7	2	33	
6	Rosslyn Park	9	5	0	4	343	287	+56	8	1	29	
7	London Scottish	9	4	0	5	330	344	−14	7	2	25	
8	Birmingham Moseley	9	4	0	5	249	312	−63	6	1	23	
9	Bishop's Stortford	9	3	0	6	322	362	−40	8	2	22	
10	Dings Crusaders	9	2	1	6	331	393	−62	8	3	21	
11	Bury St Edmunds	9	3	0	6	237	354	−117	6	0	18	Relegation play-off
12	Rams	9	2	1	6	229	304	−75	6	2	18	Relegation place
13	Sheffield	9	2	0	7	228	334	−106	6	3	17	Relegation place
14	Cambridge	9	0	0	9	240	493	−253	5	3	8	Relegation place

Updated to match(es) played on 7 November 2026. Source: National League Rugby
Rules for classification: If teams are level at any stage, tiebreakers are applied in the following order:
1. Number of matches won
2. Number of matches drawn
3. Difference between points for and against
4. Total number of points for
5. Aggregate number of points scored in matches between tied teams
6. Number of matches won excluding the first match, then the second and so on until the tie is settled

== History ==
When the rugby union leagues were introduced in 1987 the division was known as Courage League National Division Three. Ten years later, in 1997, the league was restructured and the Premiership was introduced, which consisted of the top two divisions. Therefore, National 3 became the top league outside of the Premiership structure, and was renamed as National 1. In 2000–01, the Premiership was reduced to a single division and National 1 was renamed National 2. Following the formation of the professional RFU Championship in 2009 the league, once again, became known as National League 1, and is currently the lowest tier that is nationwide. The league has previously consisted of fourteen clubs, but from 2009 to 2010 increased to sixteen before reducing to fourteen again ahead of the 2022–23 season. Only one team was promoted to the RFU Championship and between 2009–10 and 2019–20 three teams were relegated to either National League 2 North or National League 2 South depending on geographical location. Following reorganisation in 2022, three teams are now relegated to either National League 2 East, National League 2 North or National League 2 West depending on geographical location.

=== Summary of tier three format ===
Year	Name	No of teams	No of matches
1987–90	Courage National 3	12	11
1990–92	Courage National 3	13	12
1992–93	Courage National 3	12	11
1993–96	Courage National 3	10	18
1996–97	Courage National 3	16	30
1997–2000	Jewson National League 1	14	26
2000–09	National Division 2	14	26
2009–22	National League 1	16	30
2022–	National League 1	14	26

=== Original teams ===
When the league system was formed in 1987, the following teams participated in the league, which was known as National 3. Thirty-three years on, only one team Plymouth Albion, are currently playing at this level. (Updated to 2019–20)

- Birmingham — now Birmingham & Solihull, playing in Midlands 4 West (South) (9th tier)
- Exeter — now playing in the Premiership (1st tier)
- Fylde — currently playing in National League 2 North (4th tier)
- Maidstone — now playing in London 3 South East (8th tier)
- Metropolitan Police — now playing in Surrey 3 (11th tier)
- Morley — now playing in North 1 East (6th tier)
- Nuneaton — now playing in Midlands Premier (6th tier)
- Plymouth Albion — currently playing in this division (3rd tier)
- Sheffield — now playing in Midlands Premier (6th tier)
- Vale of Lune — now playing in North 1 West (6th tier)
- Wakefield — no longer participating in league rugby having disbanded in 2004
- West Hartlepool — now playing in North 1 East (6th tier)

=== League results ===
==== National Division Three ====
National Division Three
Season	No of teams	No of matches	Champions	Runners-up	Relegated team(s)	Ref
1987–88	12	11	Wakefield	West Hartlepool	Morley, Birmingham	
1988–89	12	11	Plymouth Albion	Rugby	Metropolitan Police, Maidstone	
1989–90	12	11	London Scottish	Wakefield	London Welsh	
1990–91	13	12	West Hartlepool	Morley	Metropolitan Police, Vale of Lune	
1991–92	13	12	Richmond	Fylde	Nuneaton, Lydney	
1992–93	12	11	Otley	Havant	Multiple teams (Note: Sheffield, Leeds, Liverpool St Helens, Clifton, Aspatria, Askeans, Broughton Park and Plymouth Albion were the relegated teams. The large number of relegations was due to the restructuring of the league system for the 1993–94 season.)	
1993–94	10	18	Coventry	Fylde	Havant, Redruth	
1994–95	10	18	Bedford	Blackheath	Clifton, Exeter	
1995–96	10	18	Coventry	Richmond (Note: Rugby and Rotherham were also promoted.)	Fylde in last place (no relegation)	
1996–97	16	30	Exeter	Fylde	Walsall, Havant, Redruth, Clifton	

==== National League One ====
National League One
Season	No of teams	No of matches	Champions	Runners-up	Relegated team(s)	Ref
1997–98	14	26	Worcester	Leeds Tykes (Note: London Welsh and Rugby were also promoted.)	No relegation	
1998–99	14	26	Henley	Manchester	Morley, Liverpool St Helens	
1999–00	14	26	Otley	Birmingham & Solihull	Reading, Blackheath	

==== National Division Two ====
National Division Two
Season	No of teams	No of matches	Champions	Runners-up	Relegated team(s)	Ref
2000–01	14	26	Bracknell	Rugby	Camberley, Lydney, West Hartlepool	
2001–02	14	26	Orrell	Plymouth Albion	Rosslyn Park, Waterloo, Preston Grasshoppers	
2002–03	14	26	Penzance-Newlyn	Henley	Launceston, Kendal, Fylde	
2003–04	14	26	Sedgley Park	Nottingham	Rugby, Lydney	
2004–05	14	26	Doncaster	Newbury	Nuneaton, Bracknell, Rosslyn Park	
2005–06	14	26	Moseley	Waterloo	Orrell	
2006–07	14	26	Esher	Launceston	Bradford & Bingley, Barking, Harrogate	
2007–08	14	26	Otley	Manchester	Nuneaton, Henley Hawks, Halifax	
2008–09	14	26	Birmingham & Solihull	Cambridge	Westcombe Park, Southend, Mounts Bay, Waterloo	

==== National League One ====
National League One
Season	No of teams	No of matches	Champions	Runners-up	Relegated team(s)	Ref
2009–10	16	30	Esher	London Scottish	Newbury, Nuneaton, Manchester	
2010–11	16	30	London Scottish	Barking	Redruth, Otley, Launceston	
2011–12	16	30	Jersey	Ealing Trailfinders	Birmingham & Solihull, Stourbridge, Barking	
2012–13	16	30	Ealing Trailfinders	Esher	Macclesfield, Sedgley Park, Cambridge	
2013–14	16	30	Doncaster Knights	Rosslyn Park	Henley Hawks, Worthing Raiders, Hull Ionians	
2014–15	16	30	Ealing Trailfinders	Rosslyn Park	Tynedale, Macclesfield, Old Albanian	
2015–16	16	30	Richmond	Hartpury College	Henley Hawks, Cinderford, Wharfedale	
2016–17	16	30	Hartpury College	Plymouth Albion	Macclesfield, Blaydon (Note: Only 2 teams relegated at the end of the 2016–17 season instead of 3 due to London Welsh being expelled from the RFU Championship in January 2017.)	
2017–18	16	30	Coventry	Darlington Mowden Park	Fylde, Old Albanian, Hull Ionians	
2018–19	16	30	Ampthill	Old Elthamians	Loughborough Students, Esher, Caldy	
2019–20	16	25 (Note: Due to the COVID-19 pandemic in the United Kingdom the RFU cancelled all rugby below the Premiership with most clubs in National League 1 having played 25 games, and a best playing record formula was used to decide the final table.)	Richmond	Rams	Hull Ionians, Canterbury, Rotherham Titans	
2020–21	Due to the coronavirus pandemic, the season was cancelled.					
2021–22	15	28	Caldy	Sale FC	Blackheath, Tonbridge Juddians	
2022–23	14	26	Cambridge	Rams	Esher, Leeds Tykes, Hull	
2023–24	14	26	Chinnor	Rams	Cinderford, Taunton Titans	
2024–25	14	26	Richmond	Rosslyn Park	Darlington Mowden Park, Esher (Note: The expansion of the 2025–26 RFU Championship from 12 to 14 teams meant only 2 teams were relegated instead of 3 meaning that 12th placed Leicester Lions stayed in National League 1.)	
2025–26	14	26	Rotherham Titans	Blackheath	Leicester Lions, Sedgley Park, Clifton	
2026–27	14	26				
Green background are the promotion places.

== Number of league titles ==
- Richmond (4)
- Coventry (3)
- Otley (3)
- Doncaster Knights (2)
- Ealing Trailfinders (2)
- Esher (2)
- London Scottish (2)
- Ampthill (1)
- Bedford (1)
- Birmingham & Solihull (1)
- Bracknell (1)
- Caldy (1)
- Cambridge (1)
- Chinnor (1)
- Exeter (1)
- Hartpury College (1)
- Henley (1)
- Jersey (1)
- Moseley (1)
- Orrell (1)
- Penzance-Newlyn (1) (Note: Penzance & Newlyn are now known as the Cornish Pirates.)
- Plymouth Albion (1)
- Rotherham Titans (1)
- Sedgley Park (1)
- Wakefield (1)
- West Hartlepool (1)
- Worcester (1)

== Records ==
Note that all records are from 1996–97 season onwards as this is widely held as the dawn of professionalism across the English club game. It also offers a better comparison between seasons as the division team numbers are roughly equal (for example when league rugby union first started in 1987–88 the Courage League National Division Three had only 12 teams playing 11 games each, compared to 16 teams in 1996–97 playing 30 games (home & away)). Attendance records are from 2000 onwards unless otherwise specified. All records are up to date up till the end of the 2019–20 season.

=== League records ===
- Most titles: 4

Richmond (1991–92, 2015–16, 2019–20, 2024–25)

- Most times promoted from division: 5

Richmond (1991–92, 1995–96, 2015–16, 2019–20, 2024–25)

- Most times relegated from division: 4

Nuneaton (1991–92, 2004–05, 2007–08, 2009–10)

- Most league points in a season: 148

Hartpury College (2016–17)

- Least league points in a season: 0

West Hartlepool (2000–01), Manchester (2009–10)

- Most points scored in a season: 1,455

Hartpury College (2016–17)

- Least points scored in a season: 114

Manchester (2009–10)

- Most points conceded in a season: 2,626

Manchester (2009–10)

- Least points conceded in a season: 299

Henley Hawks (1998–99)

- Best points difference (For/Against): 1,078

Esher (2009–10)

- Worst points difference (For/Against): –2,512

Manchester (2009–10)

- Most games won in a season: 30

Hartpury College (2016–17)

- Most games lost in a season: 30

Manchester (2009–10)

- Most games drawn in a season: 4

Wharfedale (2005–06), Richmond (2012–13), Ampthill (2017–18)

- Most bonus points in a season: 28

Ealing Trailfinders (2014–15)
Hartpury College (2016–17)

=== Match records ===
- Largest home win:

124 – 5 Wharfedale at home to Manchester on 26 September 2009 (2009–10)

- Largest away win:

148 – 0 Esher away to Manchester on 5 September 2009 (2009–10)

- Most points scored in a match: 148

Esher away to Manchester on 5 September 2009 (2009–10)

- Most tries scored in a match: 23

Blaydon away to Manchester on 19 September 2009 (2009–10)

- Most conversions scored in a match: 19

Esher away to Manchester on 5 September 2009 (2009–10)

- Most penalties scored in a match: 8

Esher at home to Preston Grasshoppers on 1 December 2001 (2001–02)
Stourbridge at home to Rosslyn Park on 25 October 2003 (2003–04)
Hartpury College at home to Rosslyn Park on 9 April 2016 (2015–16)
Rotherham Titans at home to Rosslyn Park on 15 September 2018 (2018–19)

- Most drop kicks scored in a match: 3

Fylde away to Esher on 13 February 2016 (2015–16)

=== Player records ===
- Most times top points scorer: 2

(England) Neil Hallett for Esher (2005–06, 2006–07)

- Most times top try scorer: 3

(England) Phil Chesters for Ealing Trailfinders (2011–12, 2012–13, 2014–15)

- Most points in a season: 399

(England) Sam Ulph for Esher (2009–10)

- Most tries in a season: 42

(England) William Harding for Blackheath (2025–26)

- Most points in a match: 51

(England) Sam Ulph for Esher away to Manchester on 5 September 2009 (2009–10)

- Most tries in a match: 7

(England) Hugo Ellis for Rosslyn Park at home to Cambridge on 12 January 2013

- Most conversions in a match: 18

(England) Sam Ulph for Esher away to Manchester on 5 September 2009 (2009–10)

- Most penalties in a match: 8

(England) Jonathon Gregory for Esher at home to Preston Grasshoppers on 1 December 2001 (2001–02)
(England) Ben Harvey for Stourbridge at home to Rosslyn Park on 25 October 2003 (2003–04)
(Wales) Gareth Thompson for Hartpury College at home to Rosslyn Park on 9 April 2016 (2015–16)
(England) Alex Dolly for Rotherham Titans at home to Rosslyn Park on 15 September 2018 (2018–19)

- Most drop kicks in a match: 3

(England) Chris Johnson for Fylde away to Esher on 13 February 2016 (2015–16)

=== Attendance records ===
(Note: Note that due to poor attendance keeping by press and online sources means that the 2000–01 and 2003–04 seasons are excluded from these statistics due to lack of information expect in the case of lowest recorded league game attendance.)

- Highest attendance (league game): 4,631

Plymouth Albion at home to Rams on 14 March 2026 (2025–26)

- Lowest attendance (league game): 50

West Hartlepool at home to Camberley on 31 March 2001 (2000–01)

- Highest average attendance (club): 2,206

Jersey (2011–12)

- Lowest average attendance (club): 180

Barking (2011–12)

- Highest average attendance (season): 653 (2017–18)
- Lowest average attendance (season): 463 (2004–05)

=== Top ten point scorers ===
As of the end of the games of 27 April 2019. Stats taken from 1996–97 season onwards and include regular league games only in National League 1 (no cup games). Points scored includes tries, drop kicks, penalties and conversions.

Rank	Nat	Name	Years	Club(s)	Points	Apps	Ratio
1	(England)	Andrew Baggett	2001–08; 2008–17	Wharfedale; Blaydon	1,707	409	4.2
2	(England)	Neil Hallett	1999–02; 2002–04; 2004–10; 2011–12	Rosslyn Park; Bracknell; Esher; Ealing Trailfinders	1,440	181	8.0
3	(England)	Alastair Bressington	2004–05; 2005–10, 2010–12; 2010	Moseley; Stourbridge; Cinderford	1,201	147	8.2
4	(England)	Lee Cholewa	1996–97; 1998–99, 2000–05; 2005–07; 2010–11	Rotherham; Harrogate; London Welsh; London Scottish	1,168	146	8.0
5	(England)	**Chris Johnson**	2012–16; 2019, 2019–	Fylde; Sale FC	1,075	119	9.0
6	(South Africa)	**Clifford Hodgson**	2012–2017; 2019–	Coventry; Birmingham Moseley	1,024	109	9.4
6	(England)	Mark Bedworth	2005–10	Wharfedale	1,024	114	9.0
7	(England)	Ben Harvey	1996–97; 1999–00; 2000–01; 2001–05	Richmond; Worcester Warriors; Moseley; Stourbridge	987	118	8.4
8	(England)	Jonathon Gregory	1996–97; 2000–04	Richmond; Esher	970	84	11.5
9	(England)	Jonathon Davies	1997–07	Wharfedale	946	198	4.8

(Bold denotes players still playing in National League 1)

=== Top ten try scorers ===
As of the end of the games of 27 April 2019. Stats taken from 1996–97 season onwards and include regular league games only in National League 1 (no cup games).

Rank	Nat	Name	Years	Club(s)	Tries	Apps	Ratio
1	(England)	David Allen	2004–17	Blackheath	147	277	0.5
2	(England)	Oliver Brennand	2011–17	Fylde	117	161	0.7
3	(England)	**Hugo Ellis**	2012–	Rosslyn Park	107	155	0.7
4	(England)	Phil Chesters	2011–13, 2014–15	Ealing Trailfinders	105	82	1.3
5	(England)	Jason Smithson	2007–17	Blaydon	96	224	0.4
6	(South Africa)	Chris Malherbe	1998–99; 2001–02; 2002–11	Camberley; Kendal; Wharfedale	95	222	0.4
6	(England)	Andrew Hodgson	1997–99, 2000–04, 2005–13, 2014–16	Wharfedale	95	264	0.4
7	(South Africa)	Christoff Lombaard	2006–07, 2008–10; 2012–15, 16–17	Cambridge; Old Albanian	81	151	0.5
8	(England)	Nigel Baker	2009–12; 2013–15, 2016; 2015; 2016–19	Stourbridge; Cinderford; Coventry; Ampthill	79	149	0.5
9	(England)	Spencer Sutherland	2011–12; 2012–18; 2018–19	Coventry; Esher; Ampthill	78	148	0.5

(Bold denotes players still playing in National League 1)

== See also ==
- English rugby union system
- List of English rugby union stadiums by capacity
