= Wharfedale R.U.F.C. =

English rugby union club, based in North Yorkshire

(England) Wharfedale
- Full name: Wharfedale Rugby Union Football Club
- Union: Yorkshire RFU
- Founded: 1923; 103 years ago
- Location: Threshfield, North Yorkshire, England
- Ground: The Avenue (Capacity: 2,000)
- Chairman: John Sykes
- President: John Spencer
- League: National League 2 North
- 2025–26: 7th
Team kit

Official website
- wharfedalerufc.co.uk

Wharfedale RUFC is a rugby union team which takes part in the fourth tier of the English league system. After twenty years in the third tier, Wharfedale was relegated from National League 1 in 2016. One of the smallest teams in the league, the club is located in the North Yorkshire village of Threshfield. Wharfedale operate four senior sides and twelve junior teams, and following a decision in 2026 to introduce 2XVs into the league structure, Wharfedale's 2nd XV entered Counties 2 Yorkshire A division.

== Honours ==
- North East 1 champions: 1987–88
- North Division 2 champions: 1991–92
- North Division 1 champions: 1993–94
- Courage League Division 5 North champions: 1995–96
- Yorkshire Cup winners (3 times): 2010, 2013, 2014

== Notable former players ==
- (England) Andrew Baggett – fly-half who became all-time National League 1 points scorer with over 1,700 scored over 14 seasons with Wharfedale (2001–08) and Blaydon (2008–17). Also capped by Yorkshire and Durham and was part of the Yorkshire side that won the 2008 Bill Beamont Cup.
- Mark Bedworth – fly-half who scored over 1,200 points for the club between 2005 and 2010. Capped by England Counties XV and Durham.
- (England) Andrew Hodgson – rugby league convert who played at centre. He is one of the all-time try scorers in National League 1 with 95 tries.
- (England) Tomas Davidson – fly-half who plays internationally for Latvia and formally played for Yorkshire Under 20. He has also coached the Latvia U18 side.
- (England) Robert Davidson – fullback who plays internationally for Latvia and formally played for Yorkshire Under 20. Latvias current top points scorer (20 Caps, 209 points).
- (England) Sam Bland – prop who plays for London based PREM Rugby side Harlequins F.C.

== Current standings ==
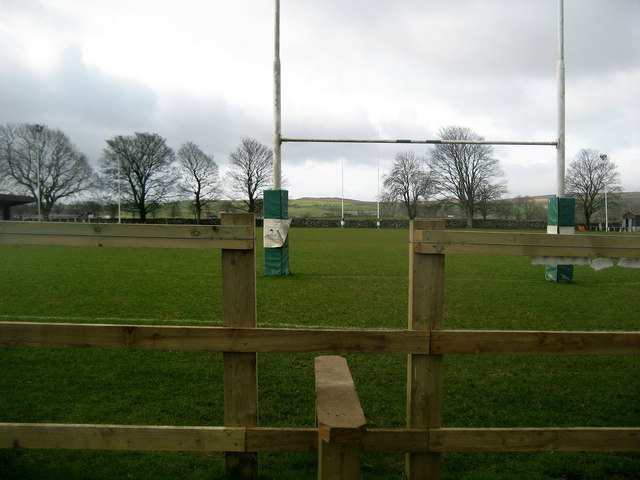
Whaferdale pitch pictured in 2011

2026–27 National League 2 North table
Pos	Team	Pld	W	D	L	PF	PA	PD	TB	LB	Pts	Qualification
1	Sedgley Park	8	8	0	0	420	111	+309	8	0	40	Promotion place
2	Darlington Mowden Park	8	6	0	2	388	159	+229	7	1	32	Promotion play-off
3	Chester	8	6	0	2	315	214	+101	6	1	31	
4	Tynedale	8	6	0	2	252	221	+31	6	0	30	
5	Hull Ionians	7	5	0	2	276	220	+56	7	1	28	
6	Preston Grasshoppers	8	5	0	3	295	235	+60	6	1	27	
7	Harrogate	8	3	1	4	204	328	−124	6	0	20	
8	Sheffield Tigers	8	3	0	5	225	229	−4	5	3	20	
9	Fylde	8	3	0	5	198	253	−55	5	0	17	
10	Billingham	8	3	0	5	222	350	−128	5	0	17	
11	Huddersfield	8	2	1	5	202	362	−160	5	1	16	
12	Heath	8	2	0	6	188	282	−94	4	1	13	Relegation play-off
13	Otley	7	1	0	6	183	292	−109	4	1	9	Relegation place
14	Wharfedale	8	1	0	7	203	315	−112	5	0	9	Relegation place

Updated to match(es) played on 2 September 2026. Source: National League Rugby
Rules for classification: If teams are level at any stage, tiebreakers are applied in the following order:
1. Number of matches won
2. Number of matches drawn
3. Difference between points for and against
4. Total number of points for
5. Aggregate number of points scored in matches between tied teams
6. Number of matches won excluding the first match, then the second and so on until the tie is settled
