= Cinderford R.F.C. =

English rugby union club, based in Gloucestershire

(England) Cinderford
- Full name: Cinderford Rugby Football Club
- Union: Gloucestershire RFU
- Founded: 1886; 140 years ago
- Location: Cinderford, Gloucestershire, England
- Ground(s): Beavis Memorial Ground, Dockham Road (Capacity: 2,500)
- Captain: Harry Hone
- League: National League 2 West
- 2025–26: 5th
Team kit

Official website
- www.cinderfordrfc.co.uk

Cinderford RFC is a rugby union club based in the town of Cinderford, Gloucestershire. The first team play in the fourth tier of the English league system following relegation from National League 1 at the end of the 2023–24 season.

== Honours ==
- South West Division 2 West champions (2): 1990–91, 1998–99
- London 1 v South West 1 promotion play-off winner: 2000–01
- South West Division 1 champions: 2004–05
- National Division 3 (north v south) promotion play-off winner: 2007–08
- National League 2 South champions: 2017–18

== Current standings ==
2026–27 National League 2 West table
Pos	Team	Pld	W	D	L	PF	PA	PD	TB	LB	Pts	Qualification
1	Redruth	6	6	0	0	265	121	+144	5	0	29	Promotion place
2	Taunton Titans	6	5	0	1	264	132	+132	5	1	26	Promotion play-off
3	Hinckley	6	5	0	1	253	108	+145	5	0	25	
4	Luctonians	6	5	0	1	198	129	+69	5	0	25	
5	Clifton	6	5	0	1	240	189	+51	5	0	25	
6	Lymm	6	4	0	2	198	202	−4	5	1	22	
7	Old Redcliffians	6	3	0	3	194	188	+6	5	1	18	
8	Cinderford	6	3	0	3	222	250	−28	5	0	17	
9	Loughborough Students	6	2	0	4	197	236	−39	5	1	14	
10	Hornets	6	1	0	5	180	200	−20	4	4	12	
11	Barnstaple	6	2	0	4	139	174	−35	2	1	11	
12	Bournville	6	1	0	5	212	348	−136	5	1	10	Relegation play-off
13	Devonport Services	6	0	0	6	145	294	−149	3	1	4	Relegation place
14	Exeter University	6	0	0	6	140	276	−136	2	0	2	Relegation place

Updated to match(es) played on 5 September 2026. Source: National League Rugby
Rules for classification: If teams are level at any stage, tiebreakers are applied in the following order:
1. Number of matches won
2. Number of matches drawn
3. Difference between points for and against
4. Total number of points for
5. Aggregate number of points scored in matches between tied teams
6. Number of matches won excluding the first match, then the second and so on until the tie is settled

== Current squad ==
Props: Chris Bundy; Tom Heard; Seb Merritt; Paul Price; Joe Smart; Dan Keat Hookers: Tom Bozzard; Rob Groves; Matt Jones; Jack Preece; Sam Wilkes; Nico Woodward; Locks: Chris Jones; Ed King; Rich Mountford; Tom Napier; Lewis Beer; Joe Dancer	Loose forwards: Luke Allen; Ashley Brown; George Evans; Will Foden; Mat Gilbert; Jake Kitson; Dave McKee; Chris McNeil; George Mills; Adam Nicholls; Matthew Lane; Scrum-halves: Sam Allford; Luke Carter; Ben Draper; Jake Wakefield; Will Merivale; Danny Pointon; Clive Stuart-Smith; Fly-halves: Rory Teague; Mike Wilcox	Centres: Simeon James; Kai Done; Dewi Scourfield; Robbie Winchle; Wings: Brian Barrett; Morgan Goodhall; Lloyd Stapleton; Full-backs: Pete Towers; Danny Trigg; Stef Hawley
