= Andrew Hodgson (rugby) =

English rugby footballer

Andy Hodgson
Personal information
- Full name: Andrew Hodgson
- Born: 9 February 1976 (age 49)

Playing information

Rugby league
- Position: Fullback, Wing
Club
Years	Team	Pld	T	G	FG	P
1997–98	Bradford Bulls	16	2	3	0	14
1999	Wakefield Trinity Wildcats	14	4	1	0	18
	Total	30	6	4	0	32

Rugby union
- Position: Centre
Club
Years	Team	Pld	T	G	FG	P
1997–2017	Wharfedale	283	101	1	0	508
2017	Sheffield	5	0	6	0	15
	Total	288	101	7	0	523

Andy Hodgson (9 February 1976) is a professional rugby league and rugby union footballer who played in the 1990s, 2000s and 2010s. He played club level rugby league (RL) for Bradford Bulls and Wakefield Trinity Wildcats, as a fullback, or wing, and club level rugby union (RU) for Wharfedale and Sheffield, as a centre.
