= Blaydon RFC =

English rugby union club, based in Swalwell

Coordinates: 54°57′14.48″N 1°41′33.01″W

(England) Blaydon
- Full name: Blaydon Rugby Club
- Union: Durham County RFU
- Founded: 1888; 138 years ago
- Location: Swalwell, Tyne and Wear, England
- Ground: Crow Trees (Capacity: 2,000 (400 seated))
- Chairman: Chris Nunn (C.O.R.)
- Coach(es): Alan Tait (Director of Rugby), Alex Tait, Lee Hogarth
- League: Regional 1 North East
- 2024–25: 10th
Team kit

Official website
- www.blaydonrfc.co.uk

Blaydon Rugby Club is an English semi-professional rugby union team. The first team currently plays in the fifth tier of the English rugby union system Regional 1 North East and the 2nd XV participates in Counties 2 Durham & Northumberland North. Their home ground is at Crow Trees, Swalwell, Tyne and Wear.

== Youth rugby ==
Blaydon run various youth teams, ranging from under-7 to under-19.

=== Best results ===
- Under-19 (2008): National semi-final [v Harrogate, 16 March, Crow Trees]
- Under-17 (2009–10): National Plate semi-final [v Sheffield, 23 March, Crow Trees]
- Under-17 (2013–14): National Shield winners (v Dartfordians, 4 May, AJ Bell Stadium)

== Honours ==
- Durham Senior Cup winners (5): 1996, 2004, 2006, 2010, 2013
- North East 1 champions: 1994–95
- North 1 v Midlands 1 promotion play-off winner: 2000–01
- National League 3 North champions: 2006–07
- North Premier champions: 2019−20

== International players ==
- (England) Mark Wilson (rugby union)
- (England) Michael Skinner (rugby union)
- (England) Steve Bainbridge
- (England) Trevor Davison
- (Trinidad and Tobago) Selwyn St. Bernard
- (Spain) Matthew Cook

== Notable former players ==
- (England) Andrew Baggett – fly-half who became the all-time National League 1 points scorer with over 1,700 points, the majority whilst playing for Blaydon. He also represented Yorkshire and Durham and was part of the Yorkshire side that won the 2008 Bill Beamont Cup.
