= 2007–08 National Division Three North =

Rugby union competition in England

- Countries: England
- Champions: Tynedale
- Runners-up: Darlington Mowden Park
- Relegated: Beverley, West Park St Helens, Morley
- Attendance: 38,301 (average 239 per match) (Note: Note that 22 home attendances are missing (see below) - so the total attendance will not be 100% accurate. The average attendance has also been taken into account with the missing games not included.)
- Highest attendance: 973; Preston Grasshoppers v Fylde; 22 December 2007
- Lowest attendance: 39 West Park St Helens at home to Leicester Lions on 15 December 2007
- Top point scorer: (England) Jon Boden (Leicester Lions); 282 points
- Top try scorer: (England) Oliver Brennand (Fylde); 22 tries

The 2007–08 National Division Three North was the eighth season (nineteenth overall) of the fourth division (north) of the English domestic rugby union competition using the name National Division Three North. New teams to the division included Bradford & Bingley and Harrogate who were relegated from the 2006–07 National Division Two, while promoted teams included Caldy (champions) and Beverley (playoffs), both coming up from North Division 1, with no team from Midlands Division 1 as the winners of that league, Luton, went into National Division Three South instead. The league system was 4 points for a win, 2 points for a draw and additional bonus points being awarded for scoring 4 or more tries and/or losing within 7 points of the victorious team. In terms of promotion the league champions would go straight up into National Division Two while the runners up would have a one-game playoff against the runners up from National Division Three South (at the home ground of the club with the superior league record) for the final promotion place.

At the end of the season the league champions were Tynedale, who made up for the disappointment of missing out on promotion from last season's playoffs by winning the title at a canter, finishing ahead of 2nd placed Darlington Mowden Park by a massive 29 points and qualifying directly for the 2008–09 National Division Two. As runners up Darlington Mowden Park had to go down to the 2007–08 National Division Three South runners up Cinderford for their playoff game, losing a tight encounter that finished 15 - 14 to the Gloucestershire side. The rest of the league was extremely tight, although the relegated sides all probably deserved to go down in terms of results with newly promoted Beverley, West Park St Helens and Morley being the three sides to go down. All three sides would drop to North Division 1 for the following season.

== Participating teams and locations ==
Locations of the 2007-08 National Division Three North teams

Team	Stadium	Capacity	City/Area
Beverley	Beaver Park		Beverley, East Riding of Yorkshire
Bradford & Bingley	Wagon Lane	4,000	Bingley, West Yorkshire
Caldy	Paton Field	4,000	Thurstaston, Wirral, Merseyside
Darlington Mowden Park	Yiewsley Drive		Darlington, County Durham
Fylde	Woodlands Memorial Ground	7,500 (500 seats)	Lytham St. Annes, Lancashire
Harrogate	Claro Road	4,500 (500 seats)	Harrogate, North Yorkshire
Hull Ionians	Brantingham Park	1,500 (240 seats)	Brantingham, East Riding of Yorkshire
Leicester Lions	Westleigh Park	2,000	Blaby, Leicestershire
Macclesfield	Priory Park	1,250 (250 seats)	Macclesfield, Cheshire
Morley	Scatcherd Lane	6,000 (1,000 seats)	Morley, Leeds, West Yorkshire
Preston Grasshoppers	Lightfoot Green	2,250 (250 seats)	Preston, Lancashire
Rugby Lions	Webb Ellis Road	4,000 (200 seats)	Rugby, Warwickshire
Tynedale	Tynedale Park	2,000 (400 seats)	Corbridge, Northumberland
West Park St Helens	Red Rocks		St Helens, Merseyside

== Final league table ==
2007-08 National Division Three North table
Pos	Team	Pld	W	D	L	PF	PA	PD	TB	LB	Pts	Qualification
1	Tynedale (C)	26	24	1	1	715	280	+435	14	0	112	Promoted
2	Darlington Mowden Park	26	17	0	9	721	494	+227	10	5	83	Promotion play-off
3	Fylde	26	15	2	9	579	485	+94	10	2	76	
4	Leicester Lions	26	13	3	10	658	466	+192	9	6	73	
5	Caldy	26	13	2	11	555	493	+62	6	5	67	
6	Harrogate	26	13	0	13	464	428	+36	7	7	66	
7	Preston Grasshoppers	26	14	0	12	463	586	−123	3	4	63	
8	Hull Ionians	26	13	0	13	441	540	−99	3	7	62	
9	Rugby Lions	26	13	0	13	533	600	−67	7	2	61	
10	Bradford & Bingley	26	10	1	15	551	593	−42	8	8	58	
11	Macclesfield	26	9	2	15	443	488	−45	1	9	50	
12	Morley (R)	26	8	3	15	446	568	−122	3	5	46	Relegated
13	West Park St Helens (R)	26	7	2	17	460	668	−208	4	7	43	Relegated
14	Beverley (R)	26	5	0	21	410	750	−340	4	6	30	Relegated

Updated to match(es) played on 19-04-2008. Source: Rugby Statbunker
(C) Champion; (R) Relegated

== Results ==
=== Round 1 ===
1 September 2007

(BP) Bradford & Bingley	38 - 25	Rugby Lions
	Report

Wagon Lane
Attendance: 240
Referee: Mick Reid

1 September 2007

Caldy	13 - 11	Hull Ionians (BP)
	Report

Paton Field
Attendance: 900
Referee: Rob Sheard

1 September 2007

Darlington Mowden Park	26 - 22	Morley (BP)
	Report

Yiewsley Drive
Attendance: 240
Referee: Guy Steel Bodger

1 September 2007

Fylde	7 - 25	Tynedale
	Report

Woodlands Memorial Ground
Attendance: 420
Referee: Ross Campbell

1 September 2007

(BP) Harrogate	41 - 6	Beverley
	Report

Claro Road
Attendance: 312
Referee: Revis Phillips

1 September 2007

Leicester Lions	16 - 10	Macclesfield (BP)
	Report

Westleigh Park
Attendance: 100
Referee: Glenn O'Hara

1 September 2007

Preston Grasshoppers	22 - 0	West Park St Helens
	Report

Lightfoot Green
Attendance: 280
Referee: Eric Woodmason

=== Round 2 ===
8 September 2007

Beverley	20 - 45	Caldy (BP)
	Report

Beaver Park
Referee: Andrew Gardner

8 September 2007

(BP) Fylde	25 - 18	Preston Grasshoppers (BP)
	Report

Woodlands Memorial Ground
Attendance: 683
Referee: Steve Harland

8 September 2007

Hull Ionians	26 - 19	Darlington Mowden Park (BP)
	Report

Brantingham Park
Attendance: 300
Referee: Glenn O'Hara

8 September 2007

(BP) Macclesfield	16 - 20	West Park St Helens
	Report

Priory Park
Attendance: 210

8 September 2007

(BP) Morley	32 - 13	Bradford & Bingley
	Report

Scatcherd Lane
Attendance: 250
Referee: Rob Sheard

8 September 2007

Rugby Lions	13 - 29	Leicester Lions
	Report

Webb Ellis Road
Attendance: 300

8 September 2007

(BP) Tynedale	41 - 10	Harrogate
	Report

Tynedale Park
Attendance: 220
Referee: Trevor Fisher

=== Round 3 ===
15 September 2007

(BP) Bradford & Bingley	27 - 20	Hull Ionians (BP)
	Report

Wagon Lane
Attendance: 220
Referee: Ian Robinson

15 September 2007

Caldy	5 - 35	Tynedale (BP)
	Report

Paton Field
Attendance: 472
Referee: Mick Reid

15 September 2007

(BP) Darlington Mowden Park	17 - 24	Beverley (BP)
	Report

Yiewsley Drive
Attendance: 160
Referee: Matthew Daubney

15 September 2007

Harrogate	23 - 5	Fylde
	Report

Claro Road
Attendance: 210
Referee: Andrew Gardner

15 September 2007

(BP) Leicester Lions	45 - 0	Morley
	Report

Westleigh Park
Attendance: 100
Referee: David Sainsbury

15 September 2007

Preston Grasshoppers	16 - 12	Macclesfield (BP)
	Report

Lightfoot Green
Attendance: 205
Referee: Mark Liddell

15 September 2007

(BP) West Park St Helens	24 - 17	Rugby Lions (BP)
	Report

Red Rocks
Attendance: 103
Referee: Philip Davis

=== Round 4 ===
22 September 2007

(BP) Beverley	27 - 20	Bradford & Bingley (BP)
	Report

Beaver Park
Attendance: 150
Referee: Revis Phillips

22 September 2007

Fylde	11 - 9	Caldy (BP)
	Report

Woodlands Memorial Ground
Attendance: 280
Referee: Matthew Daubney

22 September 2007

(BP) Harrogate	24 - 25	Preston Grasshoppers
	Report

Claro Road
Attendance: 150
Referee: Guy Steel Bodger

22 September 2007

Hull Ionians	21 - 20	Leicester Lions (BP)
	Report

Brantingham Park
Attendance: 150
Referee: Chris Seeley

22 September 2007

Morley	25 - 15	West Park St Helens
	Report

Scatcherd Lane
Attendance: 250
Referee: D Edmunds

22 September 2007

Rugby Lions	28 - 16	Macclesfield
	Report

Webb Ellis Road
Attendance: 144
Referee: Michael Tutty

22 September 2007

Tynedale	19 - 8	Darlington Mowden Park
	Report

Tynedale Park
Attendance: 160
Referee: Rob Sheard

=== Round 5 ===
29 September 2007

Bradford & Bingley	10 - 19	Tynedale
	Report

Wagon Lane
Attendance: 160
Referee: Andrew Bickle

29 September 2007

Caldy	18 - 0	Harrogate
	Report

Paton Field
Attendance: 242
Referee: Ross Campbell

29 September 2007

Darlington Mowden Park	21 - 10	Fylde
	Report

Yiewsley Drive
Referee: Revis Phillips

29 September 2007

(BP) Leicester Lions	41 - 19	Beverley
	Report

Westleigh Park
Attendance: 95
Referee: Richard Kelly

29 September 2007

Macclesfield	18 - 18	Morley
	Report

Priory Park
Attendance: 175
Referee: Ian Robinson

29 September 2007

(BP) Preston Grasshoppers	32 - 18	Rugby Lions
	Report

Lightfoot Green
Attendance: 402
Referee: Luke Pearce

29 September 2007

(BP) West Park St Helens	24 - 26	Hull Ionians (BP)
	Report

Red Rocks
Referee: Mark Liddell

=== Round 6 ===
6 October 2007

Beverley	13 - 24	West Park St Helens
	Report

Beaver Park
Attendance: 103
Referee: Rob Sheard

6 October 2007

(BP) Caldy	16 - 20	Preston Grasshoppers
	Report

Paton Field
Referee: Guy Steel Bodger

6 October 2007

(BP) Fylde	20 - 40	Bradford & Bingley (BP)
	Report

Woodlands Memorial Ground
Attendance: 160
Referee: Chris Seeley

6 October 2007

Harrogate	7 - 23	Darlington Mowden Park
	Report

Claro Road
Attendance: 370
Referee: Gareth Hodges

6 October 2007

Hull Ionians	14 - 12	Macclesfield (BP)
	Report

Brantingham Park
Attendance: 200
Referee: Andrew Gardner

6 October 2007

Morley	13 - 31	Rugby Lions (BP)
	Report

Scatcherd Lane
Attendance: 300
Referee: Eric Woodmason

6 October 2007

Tynedale	27 - 26	Leicester Lions (2BP)
	Report

Tynedale Park
Attendance: 150
Referee: D Edmunds

=== Round 7 ===
20 October 2007

Bradford & Bingley	20 - 14	Harrogate (BP)
	Report

Wagon Lane
Attendance: 230
Referee: Ian Robinson

20 October 2007

(BP) Darlington Mowden Park	39 - 7	Caldy
	Report

Yiewsley Drive
Attendance: 180
Referee: Mick Reid

20 October 2007

(BP) Leicester Lions	31 - 18	Fylde
	Report

Westleigh Park
Attendance: 120
Referee: Andrew Bickle

20 October 2007

Macclesfield	27 - 40	Beverley (BP)
	Report

Priory Park
Attendance: 226
Referee: Revis Phillips

20 October 2007

Preston Grasshoppers	21 - 20	Morley (BP)
	Report

Lightfoot Green
Attendance: 367
Referee: Gareth Hodges

20 October 2007

(BP) Rugby Lions	32 - 24	Hull Ionians
	Report

Webb Ellis Road
Attendance: 219
Referee: Steve Walters

20 October 2007

(BP) West Park St Helens	14 - 21	Tynedale
	Report

Red Rocks
Referee: Paul Kimber

=== Round 8 ===
27 October 2007

(BP) Beverley	15 - 21	Rugby Lions
	Report

Beaver Park
Attendance: 175
Referee: Matthew Daubney

27 October 2007

Caldy	15 - 15	Bradford & Bingley
	Report

Paton Field
Attendance: 342
Referee: Steve Walters

27 October 2007

(BP) Darlington Mowden Park	43 - 15	Preston Grasshoppers
	Report

Yiewsley Drive
Attendance: 190
Referee: D Edmunds

27 October 2007

Fylde	13 - 13	West Park St Helens
	Report

Woodlands Memorial Ground
Attendance: 260
Referee: Mark Liddell

27 October 2007

(BP) Harrogate	25 - 6	Leicester Lions
	Report

Claro Road
Attendance: 150
Referee: Rob Sheard

27 October 2007

Hull Ionians	17 - 10	Morley (BP)
	Report

Brantingham Park
Attendance: 300
Referee: David Sainsbury

27 October 2007

(BP) Tynedale	40 - 10	Macclesfield
	Report

Tynedale Park
Attendance: 220
Referee: Mick Reid

=== Round 9 ===
3 November 2007

(BP) Bradford & Bingley	40 - 20	Darlington Mowden Park
	Report

Wagon Lane
Attendance: 186
Referee: Nick Ashton

3 November 2007

(BP) Leicester Lions	31 - 18	Caldy
	Report

Westleigh Park
Attendance: 120
Referee: Richard Kelly

3 November 2007

Macclesfield	20 - 41	Fylde (BP)
	Report

Priory Park
Attendance: 242
Referee: Rob Sheard

3 November 2007

(BP) Morley	31 - 18	Beverley
	Report

Scatcherd Lane
Attendance: 300
Referee: Chris Seeley

3 November 2007

(BP) Preston Grasshoppers	17 - 21	Hull Ionians
	Report

Lightfoot Green
Attendance: 389
Referee: Revis Phillips

3 November 2007

Rugby Lions	22 - 10	Tynedale
	Report

Webb Ellis Road
Attendance: 250
Referee: Luke Pearce

3 November 2007

(BP) West Park St Helens	17 - 20	Harrogate
	Report

Red Rocks
Attendance: 135
Referee: John Meredith

=== Round 10 ===
10 November 2007

(BP) Bradford & Bingley	15 - 22	Preston Grasshoppers
	Report

Wagon Lane
Attendance: 165
Referee: Matthew Daubney

10 November 2007

Caldy	18 - 13	West Park St Helens (BP)
	Report

Paton Field
Attendance: 232
Referee: Brendan Fitzmaurice

10 November 2007

(BP) Darlington Mowden Park	18 - 20	Leicester Lions
	Report

Yiewsley Drive
Attendance: 192
Referee: Andrew Gardner

10 November 2007

(BP) Fylde	42 - 17	Rugby Lions
	Report

Woodlands Memorial Ground
Attendance: 280
Referee: Gareth Hodges

10 November 2007

(BP) Harrogate	21 - 27	Macclesfield
	Report

Claro Road
Attendance: 210
Referee: Kevin Warwick

10 November 2007

(BP) Tynedale	38 - 7	Morley
	Report

Tynedale Park
Attendance: 240
Referee: Mick Reid

11 November 2007

(BP) Beverley	10 - 12	Hull Ionians
	Report

Beaver Park
Attendance: 379
Referee: Mark Liddell

=== Round 11 ===
24 November 2007

(BP) Hull Ionians	3 - 8	Tynedale
	Report

Brantingham Park
Attendance: 200
Referee: Rob Sheard

24 November 2007

Leicester Lions	20 - 17	Bradford & Bingley (BP)
	Report

Westleigh Park
Attendance: 120
Referee: Mick Reid

24 November 2007

Macclesfield	23 - 19	Caldy (BP)
	Report

Priory Park
Attendance: 207
Referee: Trevor Fisher

24 November 2007

Preston Grasshoppers	22 - 17	Beverley (BP)
	Report

Lightfoot Green
Attendance: 228
Referee: Andrew Bickle

24 November 2007

Morley	21 - 32	Fylde
	Report

Scatcherd Lane
Attendance: 250
Referee: James Fisher

24 November 2007

Rugby Lions	19 - 13	Harrogate (BP)
	Report

Webb Ellis Road
Attendance: 271
Referee: Paul Knowles

24 November 2007

(BP) West Park St Helens	19 - 20	Darlington Mowden Park
	Report

Red Rocks
Attendance: 55
Referee: Richard Kelly

=== Round 12 ===
1 December 2007

(BP) Bradford & Bingley	24 - 25	West Park St Helens (BP)
	Report

Wagon Lane
Attendance: 160
Referee: Gareth Hodges

1 December 2007

(BP) Caldy	11 - 15	Rugby Lions
	Report

Paton Field
Attendance: 324
Referee: Simon Lazenby

1 December 2007

Darlington Mowden Park	11 - 27	Macclesfield (BP)
	Report

Yiewsley Drive
Attendance: 100
Referee: Chris Seeley

1 December 2007

Fylde	17 - 10	Hull Ionians (BP)
	Report

Woodlands Memorial Ground
Attendance: 320
Referee: Guy Steel Bodger

1 December 2007

(BP) Harrogate	26 - 8	Morley
	Report

Claro Road
Attendance: 250
Referee: Mick Reid

1 December 2007

Leicester Lions	30 - 5	Preston Grasshoppers
	Report

Westleigh Park
Attendance: 165
Referee: Mark Varnon

1 December 2007

(BP) Tynedale	29 - 19	Beverley
	Report

Tynedale Park
Referee: Matthew Daubney

=== Round 13 ===
15 December 2007

(BP) Beverley	26 - 27	Fylde
	Report

Beaver Park
Attendance: 154
Referee: Gareth Hodges

15 December 2007

(BP) Hull Ionians	30 - 10	Harrogate
	Report

Brantingham Park
Attendance: 300
Referee: Rob Sheard

15 December 2007

Macclesfield	9 - 8	Bradford & Bingley (BP)
	Report

Priory Park
Attendance: 207
Referee: Lee Towers

15 December 2007

Preston Grasshoppers	15 - 40	Tynedale (BP)
	Report

Lightfoot Green
Attendance: 402
Referee: Mark Wilson

15 December 2007

(BP) Rugby Lions	33 - 32	Darlington Mowden Park (2BP)
	Report

Webb Ellis Road
Attendance: 322
Referee: Tom Davis

15 December 2007

West Park St Helens	19 - 16	Leicester Lions (BP)
	Report

Red Rocks
Attendance: 39
Referee: Chris Seeley

15 December 2007

Morley	P - P	Caldy

- Postponed. Game rescheduled to 12 January 2008.

=== Round 14 ===
22 December 2007

Bradford & Bingley	19 - 10	Morley (BP)
	Report

Wagon Lane
Attendance: 280
Referee: Gareth Hodges

22 December 2007

(BP) Caldy	35 - 8	Beverley
	Report

Paton Field
Referee: Mark Varnon

22 December 2007

(BP) Darlington Mowden Park	74 - 0	Hull Ionians
	Report

Yiewsley Drive
Attendance: 181
Referee: Eric Woodmason

22 December 2007

Harrogate	3 - 17	Tynedale
	Report

Claro Road
Attendance: 300
Referee: Revis Phillips

22 December 2007

Leicester Lions	26 - 17	Rugby Lions
	Report

Westleigh Park
Attendance: 280

22 December 2007

Preston Grasshoppers	8 - 17	Fylde
	Report

Lightfoot Green
Attendance: 973
Referee: Mick Reid

22 December 2007

West Park St Helens	15 - 13	Macclesfield (BP)
	Report

Red Rocks
Attendance: 48
Referee: Steve Lee

=== Round 15 ===
5 January 2008

Beverley	10 - 26	Darlington Mowden Park (BP)
	Report

Beaver Park
Attendance: 131
Referee: Mark Liddell

5 January 2008

(BP) Fylde	9 - 14	Harrogate
	Report

Woodlands Memorial Ground
Attendance: 630
Referee: Paul Kimber

5 January 2008

Hull Ionians	10 - 29	Bradford & Bingley (BP)
	Report

Brantingham Park
Attendance: 310
Referee: Nick Ashton

5 January 2008

Macclesfield	12 - 26	Preston Grasshoppers
	Report

Priory Park
Attendance: 237
Referee: D Edmunds

5 January 2008

Morley	16 - 8	Leicester Lions
	Report

Scatcherd Lane
Attendance: 250
Referee: Guy Steel Bodger

5 January 2008

Rugby Lions	21 - 14	West Park St Helens (BP)
	Report

Webb Ellis Road
Attendance: 270
Referee: Luke Pearce

5 January 2008

(BP) Tynedale	29 - 6	Caldy
	Report

Tynedale Park
Attendance: 215
Referee: Ross Campbell

=== Round 13 (rescheduled game) ===
12 January 2008

Morley	18 - 27	Caldy (BP)

Scatcherd Lane
Attendance: 250
Referee: Andrew Gardner

- Game rescheduled from 15 December 2007.

=== Round 16 ===
19 January 2008

Caldy	22 - 7	Fylde
	Report

Paton Field
Attendance: 280
Referee: Adam Friend

19 January 2008

Darlington Mowden Park	14 - 35	Tynedale (BP)
	Report

Yiewsley Drive
Attendance: 200

19 January 2008

(BP) Leicester Lions	38 - 14	Hull Ionians
	Report

Westleigh Park
Attendance: 50
Referee: John Meredith

19 January 2008

(BP) Preston Grasshoppers	13 - 17	Harrogate
	Report

Lightfoot Green
Attendance: 287
Referee: Ross Campbell

19 January 2008

Bradford & Bingley	P - P	Beverley

- Postponed. Game rescheduled to 2 February 2008.

19 January 2008

Macclesfield	P - P	Rugby Lions

- Postponed. Game rescheduled to 2 February 2008.

19 January 2008

West Park St Helens	P - P	Morley

- Postponed. Game rescheduled to 2 February 2008.

=== Round 17 ===
26 January 2008

Beverley	5 - 54	Leicester Lions (BP)
	Report

Beaver Park
Attendance: 114
Referee: Eric Woodmason

26 January 2008

(BP) Fylde	27 - 34	Darlington Mowden Park (BP)
	Report

Woodlands Memorial Ground
Referee: Guy Steel Bodger

26 January 2008

(BP) Harrogate	25 - 11	Caldy
	Report

Claro Road
Referee: Chris Seeley

26 January 2008

(BP) Hull Ionians	35 - 19	West Park St Helens
	Report

Brantingham Park
Attendance: 110
Referee: D Edmunds

26 January 2008

Morley	13 - 0	Macclesfield
	Report

Scatcherd Lane
Attendance: 210
Referee: Andrew Bickle

26 January 2008

(BP) Rugby Lions	57 - 7	Preston Grasshoppers
	Report

Webb Ellis Road
Attendance: 276
Referee: Mark Wells

26 January 2008

(BP) Tynedale	38 - 9	Bradford & Bingley
	Report

Tynedale Park
Attendance: 272
Referee: Trevor Fisher

=== Round 16 (rescheduled games) ===
2 February 2008

Bradford & Bingley	17 - 32	Beverley (BP)
	Report

Wagon Lane
Attendance: 120
Referee: Revis Phillips

- Game rescheduled from 19 January 2008.

2 February 2008

Macclesfield	30 - 12	Rugby Lions
	Report

Priory Park
Attendance: 236
Referee: Gareth Hodges

- Game rescheduled from 19 January 2008.

2 February 2008

(BP) West Park St Helens	29 - 29	Morley (BP)
	Report

Red Rocks
Attendance: 81
Referee: Matthew Daubney

- Game rescheduled from 19 January 2008.

=== Round 18 ===
9 February 2008

(BP) Bradford & Bingley	16 - 20	Fylde
	Report

Wagon Lane
Referee: Ross Campbell

9 February 2008

Darlington Mowden Park	30 - 24	Harrogate (2BP)
	Report

Yiewsley Drive
Referee: Tim Wigglesworth

9 February 2008

Leicester Lions	18 - 34	Tynedale (BP)
	Report

Westleigh Park
Attendance: 225
Referee: Rob Sheard

9 February 2008

Macclesfield	26 - 8	Hull Ionians
	Report

Priory Park
Referee: Paul Kimber

9 February 2008

Preston Grasshoppers	25 - 56	Caldy (BP)
	Report

Lightfoot Green
Referee: Guy Steel Bodger

9 February 2008

(BP) Rugby Lions	27 - 19	Morley
	Report

Webb Ellis Road
Attendance: 245
Referee: Andrew Bickle

9 February 2008

West Park St Helens	17 - 15	Beverley (BP)
	Report

Red Rocks
Attendance: 110
Referee: Revis Phillips

=== Round 19 ===
16 February 2008

Beverley	6 - 21	Macclesfield
	Report

Beaver Park
Attendance: 86
Referee: Richard Parker-Sedgmore

16 February 2008

(BP) Caldy	21 - 27	Darlington Mowden Park
	Report

Paton Field
Referee: Rob Sheard

16 February 2008

(BP) Fylde	34 - 34	Leicester Lions (BP)
	Report

Woodlands Memorial Ground
Attendance: 580
Referee: David Sainsbury

16 February 2008

(BP) Harrogate	24 - 0	Bradford & Bingley
	Report

Claro Road
Attendance: 400
Referee: Gareth Hodges

16 February 2008

Hull Ionians	22 - 15	Rugby Lions (BP)
	Report

Brantingham Park
Attendance: 200
Referee: Kevin Warwick

16 February 2008

(BP) Morley	15 - 17	Preston Grasshoppers
	Report

Scatcherd Lane
Referee: Ross Campbell

16 February 2008

(BP) Tynedale	34 - 3	West Park St Helens
	Report

Tynedale Park
Attendance: 310
Referee: Mark Liddell

=== Round 20 ===
23 February 2008

Bradford & Bingley	5 - 36	Caldy (BP)
	Report

Wagon Lane
Attendance: 125
Referee: Marcus Caton

23 February 2008

(BP) Leicester Lions	16 - 21	Harrogate
	Report

Westleigh Park
Attendance: 150
Referee: Mark Varnon

23 February 2008

(BP) Macclesfield	13 - 19	Tynedale
	Report

Priory Park
Attendance: 243
Referee: Eric Woodmason

23 February 2008

Morley	20 - 13	Hull Ionians (BP)
	Report

Scatcherd Lane
Attendance: 150
Referee: Trevor Fisher

23 February 2008

Preston Grasshoppers	13 - 30	Darlington Mowden Park (BP)
	Report

Lightfoot Green
Attendance: 228
Referee: Revis Phillips

23 February 2008

(BP) Rugby Lions	26 - 5	Beverley
	Report

Webb Ellis Road
Attendance: 265
Referee: Glenn O'Hara

23 February 2008

West Park St Helens	18 - 26	Fylde (BP)
	Report

Red Rocks
Attendance: 77
Referee: Simon Harding

=== Round 21 ===
1 March 2008

Beverley	13 - 27	Morley
	Report

Beaver Park
Attendance: 104
Referee: Steve Walters

1 March 2008

Caldy	25 - 25	Leicester Lions
	Report

Paton Field
Referee: Mick Reid

1 March 2008

(BP) Darlington Mowden Park	26 - 21	Bradford & Bingley (BP)
	Report

Yiewsley Drive
Attendance: 186
Referee: Tim Fisher

1 March 2008

Fylde	12 - 10	Macclesfield (BP)
	Report

Woodlands Memorial Ground
Attendance: 450
Referee: D Edmunds

1 March 2008

(BP) Harrogate	31 - 17	West Park St Helens
	Report

Claro Road
Attendance: 350
Referee: Brendan Fitzmaurice

1 March 2008

(BP) Hull Ionians	10 - 11	Preston Grasshoppers
	Report

Brantingham Park
Referee: Gareth Hodges

1 March 2008

(BP) Tynedale	32 - 5	Rugby Lions
	Report

Tynedale Park
Attendance: 300
Referee: Andrew McMenemy

=== Round 22 ===
8 March 2008

Hull Ionians	22 - 21	Beverley (BP)
	Report

Brantingham Park
Attendance: 210

8 March 2008

(BP) Leicester Lions	11 - 14	Darlington Mowden Park
	Report

Westleigh Park
Attendance: 150
Referee: Rob Sheard

8 March 2008

(BP) Macclesfield	17 - 18	Harrogate
	Report

Priory Park
Referee: Mike Read

8 March 2008

Morley	12 - 12	Tynedale
	Report

Scatcherd Lane
Attendance: 278
Referee: Mark Liddell

8 March 2008

(BP) Preston Grasshoppers	19 - 21	Bradford & Bingley
	Report

Lightfoot Green
Attendance: 235
Referee: Matthew Daubney

8 March 2008

Rugby Lions	11 - 30	Fylde (BP)
	Report

Webb Ellis Road
Attendance: 172
Referee: Steve Lee

8 March 2008

(BP) West Park St Helens	18 - 23	Caldy
	Report

Red Rocks
Attendance: 146
Referee: Ross Campbell

=== Round 23 ===
15 March 2008

Beverley	5 - 26	Preston Grasshoppers (BP)
	Report

Beaver Park
Attendance: 96
Referee: Chris Sharp

15 March 2008

(BP) Bradford & Bingley	28 - 17	Leicester Lions
	Report

Wagon Lane
Attendance: 175
Referee: David Sainsbury

15 March 2008

Caldy	27 - 22	Macclesfield (BP)
	Report

Paton Field
Referee: Revis Phillips

15 March 2008

(BP) Darlington Mowden Park	60 - 21	West Park St Helens
	Report

Yiewsley Drive
Attendance: 110
Referee: Mick Reid

15 March 2008

(BP) Fylde	30 - 7	Morley
	Report

Woodlands Memorial Ground
Attendance: 335
Referee: Nick Ashton

15 March 2008

Harrogate	17 - 3	Rugby Lions
	Report

Claro Road
Attendance: 150
Referee: Chris Seeley

15 March 2008

Tynedale	21 - 20	Hull Ionians (BP)
	Report

Tynedale Park
Attendance: 210
Referee: Rob Sheard

=== Round 24 ===
29 March 2008

Beverley	7 - 33	Tynedale (BP)
	Report

Beaver Park
Attendance: 97
Referee: Matthew Daubney

29 March 2008

Hull Ionians	8 - 24	Fylde (BP)
	Report

Brantingham Park
Attendance: 210
Referee: Steve Harland

29 March 2008

Macclesfield	17 - 10	Darlington Mowden Park (BP)
	Report

Priory Park
Attendance: 191
Referee: Eric Woodmason

29 March 2008

Morley	5 - 3	Harrogate (BP)
	Report

Scatcherd Lane
Attendance: 300
Referee: Trevor Fisher

29 March 2008

Preston Grasshoppers	17 - 14	Leicester Lions (BP)
	Report

Lightfoot Green
Attendance: 237
Referee: Ross Campbell

29 March 2008

Rugby Lions	7 - 18	Caldy
	Report

Webb Ellis Road
Attendance: 294
Referee: Steve Walters

29 March 2008

West Park St Helens	P - P	Bradford & Bingley

- Postponed. Game rescheduled to 5 April 2008.

=== Round 24 (rescheduled game) ===
5 April 2008

(BP) West Park St Helens	28 - 51	Bradford & Bingley (BP)
	Report

Red Rocks
Referee: Andrew Taylorson

- Game rescheduled from 29 March 2008.

=== Round 25 ===
12 April 2008

(BP) Bradford & Bingley	19 - 24	Macclesfield
	Report

Wagon Lane
Attendance: 240
Referee: Rob Sheard

12 April 2008

(BP) Caldy	43 - 23	Morley
	Report

Paton Field
Attendance: 487
Referee: Brendan Fitzmaurice

12 April 2008

(BP) Darlington Mowden Park	52 - 0	Rugby Lions
	Report

Yiewsley Drive
Attendance: 225
Referee: Adrian Hartwell

12 April 2008

(BP) Fylde	68 - 7	Beverley
	Report

Woodlands Memorial Ground
Attendance: 675
Referee: Gareth Hodges

12 April 2008

Harrogate	12 - 23	Hull Ionians
	Report

Claro Road
Referee: Mike Read

12 April 2008

(BP) Leicester Lions	55 - 20	West Park St Helens
	Report

Westleigh Park
Attendance: 120
Referee: Andrew Bickle

12 April 2008

(BP) Tynedale	37 - 7	Preston Grasshoppers
	Report

Tynedale Park
Attendance: 310
Referee: Matthew Daubney

=== Round 26 ===
19 April 2008

Beverley	22 - 21	Harrogate (BP)
	Report

Beaver Park
Attendance: 121
Referee: Ross Campbell

19 April 2008

Hull Ionians	21 - 11	Caldy
	Report

Brantingham Park
Attendance: 204
Referee: Mark Liddell

19 April 2008

Macclesfield	11 - 11	Leicester Lions
	Report

Priory Park

19 April 2008

(BP) Morley	25 - 27	Darlington Mowden Park
	Report

Scatcherd Lane
Attendance: 317
Referee: Chris Sharp

19 April 2008

(BP) Rugby Lions	41 - 29	Bradford & Bingley (BP)
	Report

Webb Ellis Road
Attendance: 272
Referee: Glenn O'Hara

19 April 2008

Tynedale	22 - 7	Fylde
	Report

Tynedale Park
Attendance: 325
Referee: Chris Seeley

19 April 2008

West Park St Helens	14 - 24	Preston Grasshoppers (BP)
	Report

Red Rocks
Attendance: 95
Referee: D Edmunds

=== Promotion play-off ===
The league runners up of National Division Three South and North would meet in a playoff game for promotion to National Division Two. Cinderford were the southern division runners up and as they had a superior league record than northern runners-up, Darlington Mowden Park, they hosted the play-off match.

26 April 2008

Cinderford	15 - 14	Darlington Mowden Park
	Report

Dockham Road
Attendance: 2,800
Referee: Adrian Hartwell

== Total season attendances ==
Club	Home Games	Total	Average	Highest	Lowest	% Capacity
Beverley	12 (Note: Missing home attendance v Caldy on 8 September 2007.)	1,710	143	379	86	
Bradford & Bingley	12 (Note: Missing home attendance v Caldy on 9 February 2008.)	2,301	192	280	120	5%
Caldy	8 (Note: Missing home attendances v West Park St Helens on 6 October 2007, Beverley on 22 December 2007, Darlington Mowden Park on 16 February 2008, Leicester Lions on 1 March 2008 and Macclesfield on 15 March 2008.)	3,279	410	900	232	10%
Darlington Mowden Park	11 (Note: Missing home attendances v Fylde on 29 September 2007 and Harrogate on 9 February 2008.)	1,964	179	240	100	
Fylde	12 (Note: Missing home attendance v Darlington Mowden Park on 26 January 2008.)	5,073	423	683	160	6%
Harrogate	11 (Note: Missing home attendances v Caldy on 26 January 2008 and Hull Ionians on 12 April 2008.)	2,852	259	400	150	6%
Hull Ionians	12 (Note: Missing home attendance v Preston Grasshoppers on 1 March 2008.)	2,694	225	310	110	15%
Leicester Lions	13	1,795	138	280	50	7%
Macclesfield	10 (Note: Missing home attendance v Hull Ionians on 9 February 2008, Harrogate on 8 March 2008 and Leicester Lions on 19 April 2008.)	2,174	217	243	175	17%
Morley	12 (Note: Missing home attendance v Preston Grasshoppers on 16 February 2008.)	3,105	259	317	150	4%
Preston Grasshoppers	12 (Note: Missing home attendance v Caldy on 9 February 2008.)	4,233	353	973	205	16%
Rugby Lions	13	3,300	254	322	144	6%
Tynedale	12 (Note: Missing home attendance v Beverley on 1 December 2007.)	2,932	244	325	150	12%
West Park St Helens	10 (Note: Missing home attendances v Hull Ionians on 29 September 2007, Tynedale on 20 October 2007 and Bradford & Bingley on 5 April 2008.)	889	89	146	39	

== Individual statistics ==
- Note that points scorers includes tries as well as conversions, penalties and drop goals.

=== Top points scorers ===
Rank	Player	Team	Appearances	Points
1	(England) Jon Boden	Leicester Lions	25	282
2	(England) Ross Winney	Macclesfield	26	215
3	(England) James Hawken	Rugby Lions	24	189
4	(England) Jon Benson	Darlington Mowden Park	25	188
5	(England) Tom Rhodes	Bradford & Bingley	23	176
5	(England) Andrew Soutar	West Park St Helens	26	176
6	(England) James Ferguson	Hull Ionians	22	172
7	(Ireland) Simon Mason	Caldy	21	164
8	(England) Phillip Belgian	Tynedale	19	157
9	(England) Nick Wainwright	Harrogate	26	144

=== Top try scorers ===
Rank	Player	Team	Appearances	Tries
1	(England) Oliver Brennand	Fylde	26	22
2	(England) Jonny Hampsey	Morley	24	18
3	(England) Gareth Collins	Leicester Lions	24	16
4	(England) Ade Hales	Rugby Lions	21	15
5	(England) Nick Royle	Fylde	23	14
6	(Tonga) Lisiate Tafa	Bradford & Bingley	24	12
7	(England) Robert Miller	Tynedale	16	11
7	(England) James Clark	Darlington Mowden Park	16	11
7	(England) Craig Ross	Caldy	19	11
7	(England) Mark Kirkby	Bradford & Bingley	19	11

== Season records ==
=== Team ===
Largest home win — 74 pts

74 - 0 Darlington Mowden Park at home to Hull Ionians on 22 December 2007

Largest away win — 49 pts

54 - 5 Leicester Lions away to Beverley on 26 January 2008

Most points scored — 74 pts

74 - 0 Darlington Mowden Park at home to Hull Ionians on 22 December 2007

Most tries in a match — 10 (x2)

Darlington Mowden Park at home to Hull Ionians on 22 December 2007
Fylde at home to Beverley on 12 April 2008

Most conversions in a match — 9 (x2)

Darlington Mowden Park at home to Hull Ionians on 22 December 2007
Fylde at home to Beverley on 12 April 2008

Most penalties in a match — 6 (x2)

Preston Grasshoppers at home to Morley on 20 October 2007
Macclesfield at home to Rugby Lions on 2 February 2008

Most drop goals in a match — 2 (x3)

West Park St Helens away to Beverley on 6 October 2007
Fylde at home to Hull Ionians on 1 December 2007
Fylde away to Beverley on 15 December 2007

=== Player ===
Most points in a match — 23

(England) Jon Boden for Leicester Lions at home to Hull Ionians on 19 January 2008

Most tries in a match — 4 (x2)

(Tonga) Lisiate Tafa for Bradford & Bingley away to Fylde on 6 October 2007
(England) Gareth Roberts for Leicester Lions away to Beverley on 26 January 2008

Most conversions in a match — 8

(England) Stephen Nutt for Fylde at home to Beverley on 12 April 2008

Most penalties in a match — 6 (x2)

(South Africa) Gerhard Boshoff for Preston Grasshoppers at home to Morley on 20 October 2007
(England) Ross Winney for Macclesfield at home to Rugby Lions on 2 February 2008

Most drop goals in a match — 2 (x3)

(England) Rob Hitchmough for West Park St Helens away to Beverley on 6 October 2007
(England) John Armstrong for Fylde at home to Hull Ionians on 1 December 2007
(England) John Armstrong for Fylde away to Beverley on 15 December 2007

=== Attendances ===
Highest — 973

Preston Grasshoppers at home to Fylde on 22 December 2007

Lowest — 39

West Park St Helens at home to Leicester Lions on 15 December 2007

Highest Average Attendance — 423

Fylde

Lowest Average Attendance — 89

West Park St Helens

== See also ==
- English Rugby Union Leagues
- English rugby union system
- Rugby union in England
