= Ben Ward (rugby union) =

English rugby union player

- Born: 18 July 1984 (age 42)
- Height: 1.79 m (5 ft 10 in)
- Weight: 85 kg (13 st 5 lb)
- University: St Mary's University

Rugby union career
- Position: Fly-half
- Current team: Ealing Trailfinders
Senior career
Years	Team	Apps	(Points)
2004–05	Esher	24	(49)
2004–present	Ealing Trailfinders		
- Correct as of 23 April 2016

Ben Ward (born 18 July 1984) is an English rugby union player-coach who plays at fly-half. He has spent the bulk of his career at Ealing Trailfinders, being part of a team that has achieved five promotions in little over a decade as they have come up through the English league system – from tier 6 all the way up to tier 2 (RFU Championship). A dependable points kicker, he is one of the most prolific scorers in the history of National League 2 South with over 700 points in that division. Ben is currently Ealing's Director of Rugby as well as a member of the playing squad.

== Career ==
=== Early career ===
Growing up in Teddington, Greater London, Ben attended Hampton Grammar School and later, St Mary's University in Twickenham. While a young up and coming player, he was capped by England Students and was part of the junior squad at London Irish. Unable to break into Irish's first team he spent a brief spell with Esher in National Division Two before joining current side Ealing Trailfinders in 2004, then playing three divisions further down in what was then known as London 2 North. Ben had a very successful first season with Ealing as his club side finished as champions and gained promotion to London 1. The next season, he achieved a second promotion with Ealing as they finished runners up in the league but were victorious in their promotion playoff game, defeating South West 1 runners up Cleve 48–16, with Ben kicking 18 points.

=== Rise through the National Leagues ===
With promotion, Ealing started the 2007–08 season in National Division 3 South (the fourth tier of English rugby) and more than held their own in their first year in the national leagues, finishing 3rd in the division and just missing out on the promotion playoffs, 4 points off Cinderford (who would win their playoff game). Ben adapted well to the new league with 212 points in 22 games, finishing 3rd top scorer in the division. The next couple of seasons would see Ealing once again compete for promotion with successive 3rd-place finishes, which included several hotly contested battles with London rivals, Rosslyn Park, who twice pipped them to the playoffs, most notably during the 2009–10 season, where both sides ended tied on 113 points but Park went into the playoffs by virtue of winning one more game. Ben would feature and score regularly for Ealing in this time, coming 2nd and 3rd in the top scorer charts, including a career best (in the national leagues) 245 points in 2009–10.

After missing out on promotion over the past three seasons, Ealing finally went up during the 2010–11 season, coming out on top during an epic battle with eventual runners up (and fellow promoted side), Jersey. Although relegated to secondary kicker behind team-mate, Neil Hallett, Ben featured in almost every league game as his side claimed promotion. Now in National League 1, Ealing resumed battle with promotion rivals, Jersey for the 2011–12 season. With only one place up for promotion, the league standings would be reversed as they finished runners up to Jersey who went up instead. Ben resumed kicking details this season with 177 points from the 24 games he played, breaking into the division's top 10 scorers. The 2012–13 season would see Ealing wipe out the disappointment of the previous year by emphatically winning the title and promotion to the RFU Championship for the first time in the club's history, with Ben making featuring in all but 5 games.

=== Championship Stability / Director of Rugby ===
While the club's first year in the RFU Championship would end in disappointment as Ealing were relegated just 1 point adrift of old foes Jersey, they proved to be competitive in the division, with Ben featuring regularly and scoring 100 points. In June 2014, Ben who was at this point a player-coach at the club, was made Director of Rugby at Ealing replacing the outgoing coach Mike Cudmore. In his first season in charge, Ben led Ealing back into the Championship, winning the league by achieving a record breaking 136 points, including 28 bonus points, on their way to the National League 1 title. Although head coach, Ben also played a key role in the team, appearing 27 games and scoring 122 points. The 2015–16 season saw Ben lead his club to survive in the Championship, finishing 11th, way ahead of the relegated side Moseley.

== Season-by-season playing stats ==
Season	Club	Competition	Appearances	Tries	Drop Goals	Conversions	Penalties	Total Points
2004–05	Esher	National Division 2	4	0	0	6	4	24
2004–05	Esher	Powergen Cup	0	0	0	0	0	0
2004–05	Ealing Trailfinders	London 2 North	?	?	?	?	?	?
2005–06	Ealing Trailfinders	London 1	?	?	?	?	?	?
2006–07	Ealing Trailfinders	London 1	?	?	?	?	?	?
2007–08	Ealing Trailfinders	National Division 3 South	26	4	1	51	29	212
2007–08	Ealing Trailfinders	EDF Energy Trophy	3	0	0	8	1	19
2008–09	Ealing Trailfinders	National Division 3 South	26	9	0	56	25	232
2009–10	Ealing Trailfinders	National League 2 South	28	5	2	68	26	245
2010–11	Ealing Trailfinders	National League 2 South	28	5	0	21	0	67
2011–12	Ealing Trailfinders	National League 1	24	3	1	51	19	177
2012–13	Ealing Trailfinders	National League 1	25	3	1	10	4	50
2013–14	Ealing Trailfinders	RFU Championship	20	0	1	26	15	100
2013–14	Ealing Trailfinders	British and Irish Cup	2	0	0	2	5	19
2014–15	Ealing Trailfinders	National League 1	27	1	0	57	1	122
2015–16	Ealing Trailfinders	RFU Championship	10	0	0	9	5	33
2015–16	Ealing Trailfinders	British and Irish Cup	1	0	0	3	0	6

== Honours and records ==
Ealing Trailfinders

- London Division 2 North champions: 2004–05
- London 1 v South West 1 promotion playoff winners: 2006–07
- National League 2 South champions: 2010–11
- National League 1 champions (2): 2012–13, 2014–15

International/Representative

- Capped by England Students
