= 2007–08 National Division Three South =

Rugby union competition in England

- Countries: (England)
- Champions: Mounts Bay
- Runners-up: Cinderford (also promoted)
- Relegated: Luton, North Walsham, Clifton
- Attendance: 58,060 (average 348 per match) (Note: Note that 15 home attendances are missing (see below) – so the total attendance will not be 100% accurate. The average attendance has also been taken into account with the missing games not included.)
- Highest attendance: 2,100; Cinderford v Lydney; 8 September 2007
- Lowest attendance: 66; Clifton v Barking; 2 February 2008
- Top point scorer: (Wales) Lee Jarvis (Mounts Bay); 266 points
- Top try scorer: (England) Owen Bruynseels (Ealing Trailfinders); 20 tries

The 2007–08 National Division Three South was the eighth season (21st overall) of the fourth division (south) of the English domestic rugby union competition using the name National Division Three South. New teams to the division included Barking who were relegated from the 2006–07 National Division Two while promoted sides included London Scottish (champions) and Ealing (playoffs) who came up from London Division 1, Mounts Bay who came up as champions of South West Division 1 and Luton who were Midlands Division 1 champions. In the case of Luton, Midlands league champions usually moved up to National Division Three North but due to number imbalances in that division, for this season, they would go into National Division Three South instead. The league system was 4 points for a win, 2 points for a draw and additional bonus points being awarded for scoring 4 or more tries and/or losing within 7 points of the victorious team. In terms of promotion the league champions would go straight up into National Division Two while the runners up would have a one-game playoff against the runners up from National Division Three North (at the home ground of the club with the superior league record) for the final promotion place.

In what was a very competitive league there were a number of teams tipped to be promoted. In the end, it was Mounts Bay who came out on top as champions 12 points clear and sealing promotion to the 2008–09 National Division Two – part of an sequence of six successive promotions stretching back to Cornwall 1 in 2003–04. The battle for the runner up spot was keenly contested between Cinderford and newly promoted Ealing Trailfinders but in the end the Gloucestershire side took second spot despite losing their final game to the west Londoners. Cinderford would join Mounts Bay in National Division Two after defeating 2007–08 National Division Three North runners up Darlington Mowden Park in a very close playoff game viewed by over 2,000 spectators at Dockham Road. At the other end of the table newly promoted Luton went straight back down as the worst side in the division followed by North Walsham. The third and final relegation spot was very closely contested but eventually Clifton went down just 1 point behind relegation rivals Barking and Havant – an away victory against relegation rivals Havant not being enough as Barking had a shock win against champions Mount Bays to keep them up instead. Luton and North Walsham would drop to London Division 1 while Clifton would go into South West Division 1.

== Participating teams and locations ==
Locations of the 2007-08 National Division Three South teams
Greater London National Division Three South clubs

Team	Stadium	Capacity	City/Area
Barking	Goresbrook	1,000	Barking, London
Bridgwater & Albion	Bath Road	5,000	Bridgwater, Somerset
Canterbury	Merton Lane	1,500 (75 seats)	Canterbury, Kent
Cinderford	Dockham Road	2,500	Cinderford, Gloucestershire
Clifton	Station Road	2,200 (200 seats)	Clifton, Bristol
Dings Crusaders	Landseer Avenue	1,500	Lockleaze, Bristol
Ealing Trailfinders	Trailfinders Sports Ground	3,020	Ealing, London
Havant	Hook's Lane	2,000 (200 seats)	Havant, Hampshire
London Scottish	Athletic Ground	4,500 (1,000 seats) (Note: The Athletic Ground capacity had been around 7,300 in the 1990s but had reduced to around 4,500 by the time London Scottish and Richmond had returned to national league rugby.)	Richmond, London
Luton	Newlands Road		Luton, Bedfordshire
Lydney	Regentsholme	3,000 (340 seats)	Lydney, Gloucestershire
Mounts Bay	Mennaye Field	3,500	Penzance, Cornwall
North Walsham	Norwich Road	1,200	Scottow, North Walsham, Norfolk
Rosslyn Park	The Rock	2,000 (630 seats)	Roehampton, London

== Final league table ==
2007–08 National Division Three South table
Pos	Team	Pld	W	D	L	PF	PA	PD	TB	LB	Pts	Qualification
1	Mounts Bay (C)	26	23	0	3	772	337	+435	13	2	107	Promoted
2	Cinderford (P)	26	20	2	4	719	305	+414	9	2	95	Promotion play-off
3	Ealing	26	18	1	7	689	402	+287	13	4	91	
4	Canterbury	26	18	0	8	608	473	+135	10	3	83 (Note: Canterbury deducted two points for unnecessarily going to uncontested scrums in their match against Mounts Bay on 16 February 2008.)	
5	London Scottish	26	17	0	9	633	410	+223	12	3	83	
6	Dings Crusaders	26	13	1	12	492	441	+51	7	6	67	
7	Lydney	26	13	0	13	501	485	+16	6	5	63	
8	Bridgwater & Albion	26	13	0	13	495	558	−63	6	4	62	
9	Rosslyn Park	26	12	0	14	502	463	+39	5	6	59	
10	Havant	26	8	0	18	394	567	−173	3	6	41	
11	Barking	26	8	1	17	488	708	−220	3	4	41	
12	Clifton (R)	26	8	1	17	476	852	−376	4	2	40	Relegated
13	North Walsham (R)	26	6	0	20	384	711	−327	3	6	33	Relegated
14	Luton (R)	26	2	0	24	380	821	−441	3	5	16	Relegated

Updated to match(es) played on 19-04-2008. Source: Statbunker
(C) Champion; (P) Promoted; (R) Relegated

== Results ==
=== Round 1 ===
1 September 2007

(BP) Canterbury	43–13	Bridgwater & Albion
	Report

Merton Lane
Attendance: 255
Referee: Steve Walters

1 September 2007

Clifton	23–12	Havant
	Report

Station Road
Attendance: 100
Referee: Luke Pearce

1 September 2007

(BP) Ealing Trailfinders	31–52	Cinderford (BP)
	Report

Trailfinders Sports Ground
Attendance: 150
Referee: David Sainsbury

1 September 2007

(BP) London Scottish	36–3	Luton
	Report

Richmond Athletic Ground
Attendance: 700
Referee: Philip Davis

1 September 2007

(BP) Lydney	38–8	North Walsham
	Report

Regentsholme
Attendance: 675
Referee: Nigel Higginson

1 September 2007

(BP) Mounts Bay	63–10	Barking
	Report

Mennaye Field
Attendance: 500
Referee: Matthew Daubney

1 September 2007

(BP) Rosslyn Park	13–18	Dings Crusaders
	Report

The Rock
Attendance: 340
Referee: Michael Tutty

=== Round 2 ===
8 September 2007

Barking	13–13	Ealing Trailfinders
	Report

Goresbrook
Attendance: 102
Referee: P.W Davies

8 September 2007

Bridgwater & Albion	18–42	Mounts Bay (BP)
	Report

Bath Road
Attendance: 521
Referee: Ross Campbell

8 September 2007

Cinderford	21–6	Lydney
	Report

Dockham Road
Attendance: 2,100
Referee: Mark Liddell

8 September 2007

(BP) Dings Crusaders	38–8	Clifton
	Report

Landseer Avenue
Attendance: 276
Referee: Andrew Taylorson

8 September 2007

Havant	14–24	Canterbury
	Report

Hook's Lane
Attendance: 180
Referee: Steve Walters

8 September 2007

(BP) North Walsham	36–13	Luton
	Report

Norwich Road
Attendance: 240
Referee: Paul Kimber

8 September 2007

Rosslyn Park	15–27	London Scottish (BP)
	Report

The Rock
Attendance: 560
Referee: Luke Pearce

=== Round 3 ===
15 September 2007

Canterbury	29–22	Dings Crusaders (BP)
	Report

Merton Lane
Attendance: 164
Referee: Mark Varnon

15 September 2007

(BP) Clifton	27–31	Rosslyn Park
	Report

Station Road
Attendance: 70
Referee: Richard Kelly

15 September 2007

(BP) Ealing Trailfinders	34–10	Bridgwater & Albion
	Report

Trailfinders Sports Ground
Attendance: 134
Referee: Michael Tutty

15 September 2007

(BP) London Scottish	58–10	North Walsham
	Report

Richmond Athletic Ground
Attendance: 500
Referee: Andrew Bickle

15 September 2007

Luton	17–50	Cinderford (BP)
	Report

Newlands Road
Attendance: 626
Referee: Chris Seeley

15 September 2007

(BP) Lydney	31–14	Barking
	Report

Regentsholme
Attendance: 340
Referee: Luke Pearce

15 September 2007

(BP) Mounts Bay	47–17	Havant
	Report

Mennaye Field
Referee: D Edmunds

=== Round 4 ===
22 September 2007

(BP) Barking	22–29	Luton (BP)
	Report

Goresbrook
Attendance: 150
Referee: Eric Woodmason

22 September 2007

Bridgwater & Albion	15–9	Lydney (BP)
	Report

Bath Road
Attendance: 470
Referee: Andrew Bickle

22 September 2007

(BP) Cinderford	61–0	North Walsham
	Report

Dockham Road
Attendance: 250
Referee: Richard Kelly

22 September 2007

Clifton	12–44	London Scottish (BP)
	Report

Station Road
Attendance: 140
Referee: G O'Hara

22 September 2007

(BP) Dings Crusaders	10–13	Mounts Bay
	Report

Landseer Avenue
Attendance: 202
Referee: Philip Davis

22 September 2007

Havant	21–19	Ealing Trailfinders
	Report

Hook's Lane
Attendance: 253
Referee: Paul Kimber

22 September 2007

Rosslyn Park	18–29	Canterbury (BP)
	Report

The Rock
Attendance: 170
Referee: Steve Harland

=== Round 5 ===
29 September 2007

(BP) Canterbury	37–11	Clifton
	Report

Merton Lane
Attendance: 196
Referee: Paul Kimber

29 September 2007

(BP) Ealing Trailfinders	37–7	Dings Crusaders
	Report

Trailfinders Sports Ground
Attendance: 178
Referee: David Sainsbury

29 September 2007

London Scottish	8–6	Cinderford (BP)
	Report

Richmond Athletic Ground
Attendance: 400
Referee: Michael Tutty

29 September 2007

(BP) Luton	17–18	Bridgwater & Albion
	Report

Newlands Road
Attendance: 200
Referee: Mark Varnon

29 September 2007

Lydney	21–11	Havant
	Report

Regentsholme
Attendance: 545
Referee: Gareth Hodges

29 September 2007

(BP) Mounts Bay	29–19	Rosslyn Park
	Report

Mennaye Field
Referee: Mick Reid

29 September 2007

North Walsham	10–20	Barking
	Report

Norwich Road
Attendance: 250
Referee: Steve Walters

=== Round 6 ===
6 October 2007

Barking	5–33	Cinderford (BP)
	Report

Goresbrook
Referee: Paul Kimber

6 October 2007

(BP) Bridgwater & Albion	46–0	North Walsham
	Report

Bath Road
Attendance: 450
Referee: Mark Varnon

6 October 2007

Canterbury	17–14	London Scottish (BP)
	Report

Merton Lane
Attendance: 275
Referee: Steve Walters

6 October 2007

Clifton	19–55	Mounts Bay (BP)
	Report

Station Road
Referee: Ross Campbell

6 October 2007

Dings Crusaders	13–10	Lydney (BP)
	Report

Landseer Avenue
Attendance: 142
Referee: Michael Tutty

6 October 2007

(BP) Havant	32–7	Luton
	Report

Hook's Lane
Attendance: 203
Referee: Andrew Bickle

6 October 2007

Rosslyn Park	21–10	Ealing Trailfinders
	Report

The Rock
Attendance: 320
Referee: Luke Pearce

=== Round 7 ===
20 October 2007

Cinderford	22–39	Bridgwater & Albion (BP)
	Report

Dockham Road
Attendance: 350
Referee: G O'Hara

20 October 2007

(BP) Ealing Trailfinders	71–17	Clifton
	Report

Trailfinders Sports Ground
Attendance: 138
Referee: Guy Steel Bodger

20 October 2007

(BP) London Scottish	54–10	Barking
	Report

Richmond Athletic Ground
Attendance: 400
Referee: P.W Davies

20 October 2007

Luton	8–25	Dings Crusaders
	Report

Newlands Road
Attendance: 240
Referee: Matthew Daubney

20 October 2007

Lydney	10–0	Rosslyn Park
	Report

Regentsholme
Attendance: 510
Referee: Richard Kelly

20 October 2007

Mounts Bay	29–21	Canterbury
	Report

Mennaye Field
Attendance: 600
Referee: Eric Woodmason

20 October 2007

North Walsham	10–30	Havant (BP)
	Report

Norwich Road
Attendance: 230
Referee: Ed Turnill

=== Round 8 ===
27 October 2007

(BP) Bridgwater & Albion	37–19	Barking
	Report

Bath Road
Attendance: 585
Referee: Gareth Hodges

27 October 2007

Canterbury	0–22	Ealing Trailfinders (BP)
	Report

Merton Lane
Attendance: 267
Referee: P.W Davies

27 October 2007

Clifton	22–20	Lydney (BP)
	Report

Station Road
Attendance: 158
Referee: Luke Pearce

27 October 2007

(BP) Dings Crusaders	42–19	North Walsham
	Report

Landseer Avenue
Attendance: 135
Referee: G O'Hara

27 October 2007

Havant	0–39	Cinderford (BP)
	Report

Hook's Lane
Attendance: 200
Referee: Andrew Bickle

27 October 2007

Mounts Bay	20–5	London Scottish
	Report

Mennaye Field
Attendance: 608
Referee: Paul Kimber

27 October 2007

(BP) Rosslyn Park	32–3	Luton
	Report

The Rock
Referee: Michael Tutty

=== Round 9 ===
3 November 2007

Barking	31–21	Havant
	Report

Goresbrook
Referee: David Burnett

3 November 2007

Cinderford	16–13	Dings Crusaders (BP)
	Report

Dockham Road
Attendance: 320
Referee: Mark Liddell

3 November 2007

(BP) Ealing Trailfinders	16–18	Mounts Bay
	Report

Trailfinders Sports Ground
Attendance: 432
Referee: Andrew Bickle

3 November 2007

(BP) London Scottish	27–18	Bridgwater & Albion
	Report

Richmond Athletic Ground
Attendance: 400
Referee: Adam Friend

3 November 2007

(BP) Luton	44–17	Clifton
	Report

Newlands Road
Attendance: 245
Referee: Philip Davis

3 November 2007

Lydney	20–36	Canterbury
	Report

Regentsholme
Attendance: 495
Referee: Steve Harland

3 November 2007

North Walsham	10–27	Rosslyn Park (BP)
	Report

Norwich Road
Attendance: 244
Referee: Paul Kimber

=== Round 10 ===
10 November 2007

(BP) Canterbury	34–24	Luton
	Report

Merton Lane
Attendance: 192
Referee: Paul Bretz

10 November 2007

Clifton	26–20	North Walsham (BP)
	Report

Station Road
Referee: Mark Varnon

10 November 2007

(BP) Dings Crusaders	48–22	Barking
	Report

Landseer Avenue
Attendance: 106
Referee: Eric Woodmason

10 November 2007

Ealing Trailfinders	27–13	London Scottish
	Report

Trailfinders Sports Ground
Attendance: 506
Referee: Nigel Higginson

10 November 2007

(BP) Havant	15–20	Bridgwater & Albion
	Report

Hook's Lane
Attendance: 270
Referee: G O'Hara

10 November 2007

Mounts Bay	18–13	Lydney (BP)
	Report

Mennaye Field
Attendance: 550
Referee: Paul Knowles

10 November 2007

(BP) Rosslyn Park	20–23	Cinderford
	Report

The Rock
Attendance: 420
Referee: Marcus Caton

=== Round 11 ===
24 November 2007

Barking	12–10	Rosslyn Park (BP)
	Report

Goresbrook
Attendance: 120
Referee: Adam Friend

24 November 2007

Bridgwater & Albion	12–9	Dings Crusaders (BP)
	Report

Bath Road
Attendance: 583

24 November 2007

(BP) Cinderford	53–5	Clifton
	Report

Dockham Road
Attendance: 228
Referee: Matt Kemp

24 November 2007

(BP) London Scottish	26–5	Havant
	Report

Richmond Athletic Ground
Attendance: 350
Referee: Eric Woodmason

24 November 2007

(BP) Luton	18–24	Mounts Bay
	Report

Newlands Road
Attendance: 220
Referee: Chris Seeley

24 November 2007

Lydney	10–31	Ealing Trailfinders
	Report

Regentsholme
Attendance: 455
Referee: Simon Harding

24 November 2007

North Walsham	28–22	Canterbury (2BP)
	Report

Norwich Road
Attendance: 1,400
Referee: Steve Walters

=== Round 12 ===
1 December 2007

Canterbury	3–24	Cinderford
	Report

Merton Lane
Attendance: 236
Referee: Paul Knowles

1 December 2007

(BP) Ealing Trailfinders	36–15	Luton
	Report

Trailfinders Sports Ground
Attendance: 352
Referee: Joey Salmons

1 December 2007

Lydney	6–15	London Scottish
	Report

Regentsholme
Attendance: 420
Referee: P.W Davies

1 December 2007

Mounts Bay	26–7	North Walsham
	Report

Mennaye Field
Referee: Eric Woodmason

1 December 2007

Rosslyn Park	27–20	Bridgwater & Albion (BP)
	Report

The Rock
Attendance: 420
Referee: Steve Walters

1 December 2007

Clifton	P – P	Barking

- Postponed. Game rescheduled to 2 February 2008.

1 December 2007

Dings Crusaders	P – P	Havant

- Postponed. Game rescheduled to 12 January 2008.

=== Round 13 ===
15 December 2007

Barking	14–28	Canterbury (BP)
	Report

Goresbrook
Attendance: 250
Referee: Steve Walters

15 December 2007

(BP) Bridgwater & Albion	35–15	Clifton
	Report

Bath Road
Attendance: 900
Referee: Andrew Bickle

15 December 2007

Cinderford	17–0	Mounts Bay
	Report

Dockham Road
Attendance: 500
Referee: P.W Davies

15 December 2007

(BP) Havant	24–13	Rosslyn Park
	Report

Hook's Lane
Attendance: 260
Referee: G O'Hara

15 December 2007

(BP) London Scottish	29–14	Dings Crusaders
	Report

Richmond Athletic Ground
Attendance: 400
Referee: David Sainsbury

15 December 2007

Luton	3–23	Lydney
	Report

Newlands Road
Attendance: 200
Referee: David Stephens

15 December 2007

North Walsham	12–7	Ealing Trailfinders (BP)
	Report

Norwich Road
Referee: Paul Kimber

=== Round 14 ===
22 December 2007

Canterbury	17–15	Havant (BP)
	Report

Merton Lane
Attendance: 236
Referee: James Fisher

22 December 2007

Clifton	22–35	Dings Crusaders (BP)
	Report

Station Road
Attendance: 250
Referee: Paul Knowles

22 December 2007

(BP) Ealing Trailfinders	38–9	Barking
	Report

Trailfinders Sports Ground
Attendance: 344
Referee: Luke Pearce

22 December 2007

London Scottish	15–5	Rosslyn Park
	Report

Richmond Athletic Ground
Attendance: 1,320
Referee: G O'Hara

22 December 2007

Luton	18–32	North Walsham (BP)
	Report

Newlands Road
Attendance: 200
Referee: Matthew Daubney

22 December 2007

Lydney	6–15	Cinderford
	Report

Regentsholme
Referee: Nigel Higginson

22 December 2007

(BP) Mounts Bay	34–17	Bridgwater & Albion
	Report

Mennaye Field
Attendance: 450
Referee: Richard Parker-Sedgmore

=== Round 15 ===
5 January 2008

Barking	18–40	Lydney (BP)
	Report

Goresbrook
Referee: Eric Woodmason

5 January 2008

(2BP) Bridgwater & Albion	22–27	Ealing Trailfinders (BP)
	Report

Bath Road
Attendance: 593
Referee: P.W Davies

5 January 2008

(BP) Cinderford	46–7	Luton
	Report

Dockham Road
Attendance: 310
Referee: Steve Harland

5 January 2008

(BP) Dings Crusaders	8–13	Canterbury
	Report

Landseer Avenue
Attendance: 150
Referee: Andrew Smith

5 January 2008

Havant	0–24	Mounts Bay
	Report

Hook's Lane
Attendance: 250
Referee: Andrew Bickle

5 January 2008

(BP) North Walsham	12–17	London Scottish
	Report

Norwich Road
Attendance: 394
Referee: Paul Knowles

5 January 2008

(BP) Rosslyn Park	39–13	Clifton
	Report

The Rock
Attendance: 380
Referee: Tom Davis

=== Round 12 (rescheduled game) ===
12 January 2008

(BP) Dings Crusaders	27–0	Havant
	Report

Landseer Avenue
Attendance: 146
Referee: Steve Walters

- Game rescheduled from 1 December 2007.

=== Round 16 ===
19 January 2008

Canterbury	25–19	Rosslyn Park (BP)
	Report

Merton Lane
Attendance: 231
Referee: Paul Kimber

19 January 2008

(BP) Ealing Trailfinders	25–20	Havant (BP)
	Report

Trailfinders Sports Ground
Attendance: 281
Referee: Mark Liddell

19 January 2008

(BP) London Scottish	60–26	Clifton
	Report

Richmond Athletic Ground
Attendance: 500
Referee: Steve Walters

19 January 2008

(BP) Luton	14–16	Barking
	Report

Newlands Road
Attendance: 250
Referee: Mark Varnon

19 January 2008

Lydney	28–21	Bridgwater & Albion (BP)
	Report

Regentsholme
Attendance: 520
Referee: Mike Beech

19 January 2008

(BP) Mounts Bay	26–5	Dings Crusaders
	Report

Mennaye Field
Attendance: 500
Referee: G O'Hara

19 January 2008

(BP) North Walsham	15–16	Cinderford
	Report

Norwich Road
Attendance: 276
Referee: Gareth Hodges

=== Round 17 ===
26 January 2008

(BP) Barking	37–29	North Walsham (BP)
	Report

Goresbrook
Attendance: 210
Referee: David Sainsbury

26 January 2008

Bridgwater & Albion	15–12	Luton (BP)
	Report

Bath Road
Attendance: 701
Referee: G O'Hara

26 January 2008

(BP) Cinderford	39–10	London Scottish
	Report

Dockham Road
Attendance: 540
Referee: Richard Parker-Sedgmore

26 January 2008

(BP) Clifton	11–18	Canterbury
	Report

Station Road
Attendance: 80
Referee: Ed Turnill

26 January 2008

Dings Crusaders	18–12	Ealing Trailfinders (BP)
	Report

Landseer Avenue
Attendance: 145
Referee: Paul Knowles

26 January 2008

Havant	13–25	Lydney
	Report

Hook's Lane
Attendance: 270
Referee: Luke Pearce

26 January 2008

Rosslyn Park	17–27	Mounts Bay (BP)
	Report

The Rock
Attendance: 380
Referee: Mick Reid

=== Round 12 (rescheduled game) ===
2 February 2008

(BP) Clifton	25–22	Barking (BP)
	Report

Station Road
Attendance: 66
Referee: JP Doyle

- Game rescheduled from 1 December 2007.

=== Round 18 ===
9 February 2008

Cinderford	25–13	Barking
	Report

Dockham Road
Attendance: 310
Referee: Matthew Daubney

9 February 2008

Ealing Trailfinders	26–20	Rosslyn Park (BP)
	Report

Trailfinders Sports Ground
Attendance: 471
Referee: Lee Towers

9 February 2008

(BP) London Scottish	18–22	Canterbury
	Report

Richmond Athletic Ground
Attendance: 300
Referee: P.W Davies

9 February 2008

(BP) Luton	15–20	Havant
	Report

Newlands Road
Referee: Mick Reid

9 February 2008

Lydney	21–18	Dings Crusaders (BP)
	Report

Regentsholme
Attendance: 420
Referee: G O'Hara

9 February 2008

(BP) Mounts Bay	57–5	Clifton
	Report

Mennaye Field
Attendance: 400
Referee: Eric Woodmason

9 February 2008

(BP) North Walsham	18–19	Bridgwater & Albion
	Report

Norwich Road
Referee: Steve Walters

=== Round 19 ===
16 February 2008

(BP) Barking	34–5	London Scottish
	Report

Goresbrook
Attendance: 203
Referee: Luke Pearce

16 February 2008

Bridgwater & Albion	9–23	Cinderford
	Report

Bath Road
Attendance: 579
Referee: Paul Kimber

16 February 2008

(BP) Canterbury	15–16	Mounts Bay
	Report

Merton Lane
Attendance: 436
Referee: Paul Knowles

16 February 2008

Clifton	22–36	Ealing Trailfinders
	Report

Station Road
Attendance: 103
Referee: Chris Seeley

16 February 2008

(BP) Dings Crusaders	30–21	Luton
	Report

Landseer Avenue
Attendance: 121
Referee: Guy Steel Bodger

16 February 2008

Havant	16–26	North Walsham
	Report

Hook's Lane
Attendance: 275
Referee: Andrew Bickle

16 February 2008

(BP) Rosslyn Park	11–12	Lydney
	Report

The Rock
Attendance: 310
Referee: Tom Davis

=== Round 20 ===
23 February 2008

(BP) Barking	16–17	Bridgwater & Albion
	Report

Goresbrook
Attendance: 181
Referee: Mark Liddell

23 February 2008

(BP) Cinderford	33–7	Havant
	Report

Dockham Road
Attendance: 270
Referee: Steve Walters

23 February 2008

Ealing Trailfinders	20–9	Canterbury
	Report

Trailfinders Sports Ground
Attendance: 178
Referee: Mick Reid

23 February 2008

London Scottish	18–35	Mounts Bay (BP)
	Report

Richmond Athletic Ground
Referee: Michael Tutty

23 February 2008

(BP) Luton	29–40	Rosslyn Park (BP)
	Report

Newlands Road
Attendance: 300
Referee: D Edmunds

23 February 2008

(BP) Lydney	24–13	Clifton
	Report

Regentsholme
Attendance: 430
Referee: Matthew Daubney

23 February 2008

North Walsham	27–8	Dings Crusaders
	Report

Norwich Road
Attendance: 281
Referee: Ed Turnill

=== Round 21 ===
1 March 2008

(BP) Bridgwater & Albion	15–22	London Scottish (BP)
	Report

Bath Road
Attendance: 973
Referee: Andrew Bickle

1 March 2008

(BP) Canterbury	37–32	Lydney (2BP)
	Report

Merton Lane
Attendance: 232
Referee: David Sainsbury

1 March 2008

(BP) Clifton	31–5	Luton
	Report

Station Road
Attendance: 100
Referee: Mark Varnon

1 March 2008

(BP) Dings Crusaders	20–20	Cinderford
	Report

Landseer Avenue
Attendance: 105
Referee: Paul Kimber

1 March 2008

Havant	20–12	Barking
	Report

Hook's Lane
Attendance: 260
Referee: Guy Steel Bodger

1 March 2008

(BP) Mounts Bay	13–15	Ealing Trailfinders
	Report

Mennaye Field
Attendance: 500
Referee: Eric Woodmason

1 March 2008

Rosslyn Park	14–0	North Walsham
	Report

The Rock
Attendance: 382
Referee: Chris Seeley

=== Round 22 ===
8 March 2008

(BP) Barking	18–21	Dings Crusaders
	Report

Goresbrook
Attendance: 100
Referee: Paul Knowles

8 March 2008

(BP) Bridgwater & Albion	29–25	Havant (BP)
	Report

Bath Road
Attendance: 375
Referee: Steve Walters

8 March 2008

Cinderford	20–6	Rosslyn Park
	Report

Dockham Road
Attendance: 200
Referee: G O'Hara

8 March 2008

London Scottish	20–3	Ealing Trailfinders
	Report

Richmond Athletic Ground
Referee: Guy Steel Bodger

8 March 2008

Luton	20–41	Canterbury (BP)
	Report

Newlands Road
Attendance: 150
Referee: Pedro Montoya

8 March 2008

Lydney	6–30	Mounts Bay (BP)
	Report

Regentsholme
Attendance: 460
Referee: Steve Harland

8 March 2008

(BP) North Walsham	17–21	Clifton
	Report

Norwich Road
Attendance: 286
Referee: Terry Hall

=== Round 23 ===
15 March 2008

(BP) Canterbury	34–7	North Walsham
	Report

Merton Lane
Attendance: 203
Referee: Paul Kimber

15 March 2008

Clifton	22–22	Cinderford
	Report

Station Road
Attendance: 120
Referee: Gareth Hodges

15 March 2008

Dings Crusaders	15–7	Bridgwater & Albion
	Report

Landseer Avenue
Attendance: 122
Referee: Simon McConnell

15 March 2008

(BP) Ealing Trailfinders	43–13	Lydney
	Report

Trailfinders Sports Ground
Attendance: 178
Referee: Eric Woodmason

15 March 2008

Havant	12–11	London Scottish (BP)
	Report

Hook's Lane
Attendance: 280
Referee: Luke Pearce

15 March 2008

(BP) Mounts Bay	64–12	Luton
	Report

Mennaye Field
Attendance: 300
Referee: Andrew Bickle

15 March 2008

(BP) Rosslyn Park	32–24	Barking
	Report

The Rock
Attendance: 282
Referee: Ed Turnill

=== Round 24 ===
29 March 2008

(BP) Barking	42–15	Clifton
	Report

Goresbrook
Attendance: 150
Referee: Richard Phillips

29 March 2008

Bridgwater & Albion	7–18	Rosslyn Park
	Report

Bath Road
Attendance: 732
Referee: David Stephens

29 March 2008

Cinderford	19–3	Canterbury
	Report

Dockham Road
Attendance: 280
Referee: Mark Newton

29 March 2008

Havant	11–3	Dings Crusaders
	Report

Hook's Lane
Attendance: 300
Referee: Luke Pearce

29 March 2008

(BP) London Scottish	36–12	Lydney
	Report

Richmond Athletic Ground
Attendance: 400
Referee: Mark Liddell

29 March 2008

Luton	7–24	Ealing Trailfinders (BP)
	Report

Newlands Road
Attendance: 305
Referee: Chris Seeley

29 March 2008

North Walsham	5–20	Mounts Bay
	Report

Norwich Road
Attendance: 290
Referee: Paul Knowles

=== Round 25 ===
12 April 2008

(BP) Canterbury	36–19	Barking
	Report

Merton Lane
Attendance: 362
Referee: Richard Parker-Sedgmore

12 April 2008

(BP) Clifton	26–0	Bridgwater & Albion
	Report

Station Road
Attendance: 312
Referee: Darren Gamage

12 April 2008

Dings Crusaders	20–10	London Scottish
	Report

Landseer Avenue
Attendance: 143
Referee: Nigel Higginson

12 April 2008

(BP) Ealing Trailfinders	52–12	North Walsham
	Report

Trailfinders Sports Ground
Attendance: 282
Referee: David Sainsbury

12 April 2008

(BP) Lydney	42–7	Luton
	Report

Regentsholme
Attendance: 525
Referee: Steve Harland

12 April 2008

(BP) Mounts Bay	28–16	Cinderford
	Report

Mennaye Field
Attendance: 1,000
Referee: Nick Williams

12 April 2008

Rosslyn Park	19–18	Havant (BP)
	Report

The Rock
Attendance: 540
Referee: John Meredith

=== Round 26 ===
19 April 2008

Barking	16–14	Mounts Bay
	Report

Goresbrook
Attendance: 300
Referee: Mick Reid

19 April 2008

Bridgwater & Albion	16–15	Canterbury (BP)
	Report

Bath Road
Attendance: 647
Referee: Andrew Bickle

19 April 2008

(BP) Cinderford	8–12	Ealing Trailfinders
	Report

Dockham Road
Attendance: 260
Referee: Eric Woodmason

19 April 2008

Dings Crusaders	5–16	Rosslyn Park
	Report

Landseer Avenue
Attendance: 127
Referee: Mark Varnon

19 April 2008

(BP) Havant	15–21	Clifton
	Report

Hook's Lane
Attendance: 350
Referee: Terry Hall

19 April 2008

Luton	12–35	London Scottish (BP)
	Report

Newlands Road
Attendance: 320
Referee: Steve Walters

19 April 2008

(BP) North Walsham	22–23	Lydney
	Report

Norwich Road
Attendance: 300
Referee: Guy Steel Bodger

=== Promotion play-off ===
The league runners up of National Division Three South and North would meet in a playoff game for promotion to National Division Two. Cinderford were the southern division runners up and as they had a superior league record than northern runners-up, Darlington Mowden Park, they hosted the play-off match.

26 April 2008

Cinderford	15–14	Darlington Mowden Park
	Report

Dockham Road
Attendance: 2,800
Referee: Adrian Hartwell

== Total season attendances ==
Club	Home Games	Total	Average	Highest	Lowest	% Capacity
Barking	10 (Note: Missing home attendances v Cinderford on 6 October 2007, Havant on 3 November 2007 and Lydney on 5 January 2008.)	1,766	177	300	100	18%
Bridgwater & Albion	13	8,109	624	973	375	12%
Canterbury	13	3,049	254	436	164	17%
Cinderford	13	5,918	455	2,100	200	18%
Clifton	11 (Note: Missing home attendances v Mounts Bay on 6 October 2007 and North Walsham on 10 November 2007.)	1,499	136	312	66	6%
Dings Crusaders	13	1,920	148	276	105	10%
Ealing Trailfinders	13	3,624	279	506	134	9%
Havant	13	3,351	258	350	180	13%
London Scottish (Note: Missing home attendances v Mounts Bay on 23 February 2008 and Ealing Trailfinders on 8 March 2008.)	11	5,670	515	1,320	300	11%
Luton	12 (Note: Missing home attendance v Havant on 9 February 2008.)	3,256	271	626	150	
Lydney	12 (Note: Missing home attendance v Cinderford on 22 December 2007.)	5,795	483	675	340	16%
Mounts Bay	10 (Note: Missing home attendances v Havant on 15 September 2007, Rosslyn Park on 29 September 2007 and North Walsham on 1 December 2007.)	5,408	541	1,000	300	15%
North Walsham	11 (Note: Missing home attendances v Ealing Trailfinders on 15 December 2007 and Bridgwater & Albion on 9 February 2008.)	4,191	381	1,400	230	30%
Rosslyn Park	12 (Note: Missing home attendance v Luton on 27 October 2007.)	4,504	375	560	170	19%

== Individual statistics ==
- Note that points scorers includes tries as well as conversions, penalties and drop goals.

=== Top points scorers ===
Rank	Player	Team	Appearances	Points
1	(Wales) Lee Jarvis	Mounts Bay	24	266
2	(England) Richard Mahoney	Rosslyn Park	24	215
3	(England) Ben Ward	Ealing Trailfinders	26	212
4	(England) Tristan Roberts	Cinderford	19	187
5	(England) Harry Bryan	Barking	22	170
6	(England) John Barnes	Clifton	22	166
7	(England) Adam Westall	Lydney	14	127
8	(England) Waylon Gasson	Dings Crusaders	19	122
9	(South Africa) Gert De Kock	Canterbury	25	121
10	(England) Mark Davies	Lydney	12	120

=== Top try scorers ===
Rank	Player	Team	Appearances	Tries
1	(England) Owen Bruynseels	Ealing Trailfinders	26	20
2	(England) Chris McNeil	Cinderford	22	19
3	(England) Rob Viol	Clifton	19	15
3	(England) Michael Melford	Canterbury	25	15
4	(South Africa) Dylan Raubenheimer	Havant	18	14
4	(England) James Copsey	Cinderford	22	14
4	(South Africa) Gert De Kock	Canterbury	25	14
4	(England) Kiba Richards	Ealing Trailfinders	26	14
5	(England) Michael Panoho	Dings Crusaders	25	13
6	(England) Matt Fitzgerald	London Scottish	19	12
6	(England) Andy Thorpe	North Walsham	20	12
6	(England) Jonathan Marlin	Mounts Bay	23	12

== Season records ==
=== Team ===
Largest home win – 61 pts

61 – 0 Cinderford at home to North Walsham on 22 September 2007

Largest away win – 39 pts

39 – 0 Cinderford away to Havant on 27 October 2007

Most points scored – 71 pts

71 – 17 Ealing Trailfinders at home to Clifton on 20 October 2007

Most tries in a match – 10 (x4)

Cinderford at home to North Walsham on 22 September 2007 Ealing Trailfinders at home to Clifton on 20 October 2007
London Scottish at home to Luton on 19 January 2008
Mounts Bay v Luton on 15 March 2008

Most conversions in a match – 9 (x2)

Ealing Trailfinders at home to Clifton on 20 October 2007
Mounts Bay v Luton on 15 March 2008

Most penalties in a match – 6 (x2)

Mounts Bay away to Ealing Trailfinders on 3 November 2007
Luton at home to North Walsham on 22 December 2007

Most drop goals in a match – 1

N/A – multiple teams

=== Player ===
Most points in a match – 27

(Wales) Lee Jarvis for Mounts Bay away to Bridgwater & Albion on 8 September 2007

Most tries in a match – 4 (x2)

(England) Stuart Peel for London Scottish at home to Barking on 20 October 2007
(South Africa) Gert De Kock for Canterbury at home to Barking on 12 April 2008

Most conversions in a match – 9 (x2)

(Wales) Lee Jarvis for Mounts Bay at home to Barking on 1 September 2007
(England) Ben Ward for Ealing Trailfinders at home to Clifton on 20 October 2007

Most penalties in a match – 6 (x3)

(England) Tim Mosey for Mounts Bay away to Ealing Trailfinders on 3 November 2007
(Wales) Lee Jarvis for Mounts Bay at home to Lydney on 10 November 2007
(England) Andy Davey for Luton at home to North Walsham on 22 December 2007

Most drop goals in a match – 1

N/A – multiple players

=== Attendances ===
Highest – 2,100

Cinderford at home to Lydney on 8 September 2007

Lowest – 66

Clifton at home to Barking on 2 February 2008

Highest Average Attendance – 624

Bridgwater & Albion

Lowest Average Attendance – 136

Clifton

== See also ==
- English rugby union system
- Rugby union in England
