= Jon Boden (rugby union) =

English rugby union & league player

- Born: 19 October 1978 (age 48)
- Height: 6 ft 1 in (1.85 m)

Rugby union career
- Position(s): Fly-half, Centre
- Current team: Leicester Lions
Senior career
Years	Team	Apps	(Points)
2000–02	Gran Parma		
2002–04	Rugby Lions	48	(295)
2004–06	Doncaster Knights	55	(92)
2007–	Leicester Lions	278	(2,064)
- Correct as of 5 May 2018
- Rugby league career

Playing information
Club
Years	Team	Pld	T	G	FG	P
	London Broncos

Jon Boden (born 19 October 1978) is a rugby union footballer/coach, currently playing at Fly-half or Centre for Leicester Lions in National League 2 North. He has played higher level rugby (second tier) for Rugby Lions and Doncaster Knights, as well as European rugby with Italian side Gran Parma (now disbanded). An excellent kicker, as of the end of the 2015–16 season, Jon is the all-time points scorer in National League 2 North with over 2,000 points.

== Career ==
After spending some of his early career playing rugby league with the London Broncos, Jon moved to Italy to play rugby union for Italian side, Gran Parma, where he became a regular in the team, gaining Super 10 and European Shield experience. In the autumn of 2002, after two years in Italy, Jon returned to England to sign for the Rugby Lions, then playing in division 2 of the English rugby union league system. Despite appearing and scoring regularly for the Lions, Jon's time with the club was not successful, as they suffered consecutive relegations in the two seasons he was there.

Following the Lion's relegation, in the summer of 2004 Jon moved north to sign for Doncaster, who were playing in the same division that Rugby had just been relegated from. After several dismal seasons, Jon's luck was to change as he made 20 league appearances for his new club, who won the league and promotion to the second division. Jon spent several more seasons with Doncaster, where he became a squad player, but decided to leave during the 2006–07 season as Doncaster were becoming a professional outfit and he could not combine full-time rugby with his other job role as a school teacher.

At the start of 2007 Jon joined tier 4 side, Leicester Lions, where he was signed as a player-coach. Jon became an invaluable player at the Lions, finishing as the league's top scorer in 2008 with 282 points as the Lions finished 4th. Since then he has regularly finished as one of the top kickers in what is now known as National League 2 North becoming the most prolific points scorer in the division of all time as of the end of the 2016–17 season. In the summer of 2017 Jon was part of the Leicestershire county side that won the 2017 County Championship Plate with a 39–7 win over Hampshire at Twickenham Stadium.

== Season-by-season playing stats ==
=== Club ===
Season	Club	Competition	Appearances	Tries	Drop Goals	Conversions	Penalties	Total Points
2001–02	Gran Parma	Super 10	?	?	?	?	?	?
2001–02	Gran Parma	European Challenge Cup	6	0	1	5	12	49
2002–03	Rugby Lions	National Division One	21	2	1	23	26	137
2003–04	Rugby Lions	National Division Two	25	4	1	21	24	137
2003–04	Rugby Lions	Powergen Cup	2	1	1	5	1	21
2004–05	Doncaster Knights	National Division Two	20	4	0	3	2	32
2004–05	Doncaster Knights	Powergen Cup	2	0	0	1	3	11
2005–06	Doncaster Knights	National Division One	26	3	0	2	7	40
2005–06	Doncaster Knights	Powergen National Trophy	1	0	0	0	0	0
2006–07	Doncaster Knights	National Division One	6	1	0	2	0	9
2006–07	Leicester Lions	National Division 3 North	10	1	0	24	13	92
2007–08	Leicester Lions	National Division 3 North	25	5	2	55	47	282
2008–09	Leicester Lions	National Division 3 North	24	7	0	54	27	224
2008–09	Leicester Lions	EDF Energy Trophy	1	0	0	1	0	2
2009–10	Leicester Lions	National League 2 North	24	7	1	56	32	246
2010–11	Leicester Lions	National League 2 North	29	5	0	69	40	283
2011–12	Leicester Lions	National League 2 North	25	1	0	22	22	115
2012–13	Leicester Lions	National League 2 North	24	0	0	46	35	197
2013–14	Leicester Lions	National League 2 North	24	0	0	59	34	220
2014–15	Leicester Lions	National League 2 North	16	2	0	34	9	105
2015–16	Leicester Lions	National League 2 North	21	1	0	15	5	50
2016–17	Leicester Lions	National League 2 North	28	2	0	41	16	140
2017-18	Leicester Lions	National League 2 North	27	0	0	36	12	108

=== County/Representative ===
Season	Side	Competition	Appearances	Tries	Drop Goals	Conversions	Penalties	Total Points
2016–17	Leicestershire	County Championship Plate	3 (Note: May have appeared in all 4 games but press coverage of county championships very poor so not clear.)	0	5	0	0	10

== Honours and records ==
National League 2 North

- Division 4 (North) all-time top point scorer (1,814 points)

Doncaster Knights

- National Division Two champions: 2004–05

Leicester Lions

- National League 2 North top points scorer: 2007–08 (282 points)

Leicestershire

- County Championship Plate winners: 2017
