= Owen Bruynseels =

- Born: 24 April 1985 (age 41)
- Height: 1.83 m (6 ft 0 in)
- Weight: 98 kg (15 st 6 lb)

Rugby union career
- Position: Wing
- Current team: Ealing Trailfinders
Senior career
Years	Team	Apps	(Points)
2003–15	Ealing Trailfinders	203	(?)
- Correct as of 30 April 2016
International career
Years	Team	Apps	(Points)
2012	England Counties XV	1	(5)

Owen Bruynseels (born 1987) is a retired English rugby union player who played as a winger. He spent his entire career with Ealing Trailfinders, with over 200 appearances, that saw his club rise from the 6th division of English Rugby all the way up to the RFU Championship (tier 2). An opportunistic try scorer he was one of the most prolific in National League 2 South history with 81 tries in four seasons. Since retiring from playing due to injury in 2015, he was inducted into the Ealing Trailfinders 'Hall of Fame' and remains at the club as team manager.

== Career ==
=== Early career ===
Owen made his first team debut for Ealing against Twickenham in 2003. After a couple of seasons playing in London 2 North, Owen experienced his first silverware when his club were crowned league champions in 2005, winning all but one game on their way to the title. The next year newly promoted Ealing finished second in London Division 1 and qualified for a playoff against the runners-up South West 1. With home advantage given to the Trailfinders due to a better overall league standing than opponents, Cleve, Ealing won emphatically, 48–17, to gain promotion to the National Leagues.

=== Rise through the National Leagues ===
In 2007–08 despite being new boys to National Division 3 South, Ealing more than held their own, with Owen contributing 20 tries to a side that finished 3rd in the league and finished as the division's top try scorer. After a second year in which Ealing finished 3rd once again, Owen scored 18 tries from just 19 appearances during the 2009–10 as his side agonisingly missed out on the promotion playoffs, being tied on 113 points with 2nd placed Rosslyn Park, who had a better win record. After missing out on promotion over the past 3 seasons, Ealing finally did it by winning the newly named National League 2 South title after an epic battle with runners-up Jersey. It proved to be a record-breaking season for Ealing's players as Owen formed a part of a lethal strike force with fellow winger Phil Chesters as the two team-mates scored 102 tries between them. Owen got a career best of 32 tries (including 6 in one game) while Phil got an incredible 70 tries (an all-time English league record) as they destroyed defences on the way to the title, also becoming the top two try scorers in the division.

Their debut season in National League 1 saw Owen and Phil Chesters continue their prolific partnership with 62 tries between them (Owen got 20) as they finished runners-up to fellow promoted side, Jersey, who took the only promotion place. In February 2012 Owen would be called up by the England Counties XV for their game against an Irish representative side at Preston Grasshopper's Lightfoot Green ground, scoring the final try in a 34–16 victory. The 2012–13 season would see the club reach the highest point in their history as they won promotion to the RFU Championship, justifiably being deserving of their National League 1 title by finishing way ahead of second place club, Esher, with Owen contributing 15 tries to the title campaign.

=== Championship and Injury ===
The 2013–14 season started badly for Owen as he was injured in the final pre-season game, meaning that he did not play his first game until October when he returned to the side for a British and Irish Cup game against Welsh side Cross Keys. His return would not last long as Owen was injured for a second time that season – this time seriously as he broke his leg in a January league game against Moseley, ending his campaign in a year when he reached 200 club appearances for Ealing. To add to his disappointment, his side were also relegated from the RFU Championship after a close scrap with Jersey. Although he made a handful of appearances during the 2014–15 season in National League 1 (which Ealing won), including a final try, Owen was unable to recover from the injuries suffered at the end of the last season and he was forced to retire after 12 seasons with the club. He is currently employed at the club in the role of team manager.

== Season-by-season playing stats ==
Season	Club	Competition	Appearances	Tries	Drop Goals	Conversions	Penalties	Total Points
2003–04	Ealing Trailfinders	London 2 North	?	?	?	?	?	?
2004–05	Ealing Trailfinders	London 2 North	?	?	?	?	?	?
2004–05	Ealing Trailfinders	Powergen Cup	1	0	0	0	0	0
2005–06	Ealing Trailfinders	London Division 1	?	?	?	?	?	?
2006–07	Ealing Trailfinders	London Division 1	?	?	?	?	?	?
2007–08	Ealing Trailfinders	National Division 3 South	26	20	0	0	0	100
2007–08	Ealing Trailfinders	EDF Energy Cup	1	1	0	0	0	5
2008–09	Ealing Trailfinders	National Division 3 South	20	11	0	0	0	55
2009–10	Ealing Trailfinders	National League 2 South	19	18	0	0	0	90
2010–11	Ealing Trailfinders	National League 2 South	30	32	0	0	0	160
2011–12	Ealing Trailfinders	National League 1	27	20	0	0	0	100
2012–13	Ealing Trailfinders	National League 1	22	15	0	0	0	75
2013–14	Ealing Trailfinders	RFU Championship	4	0	0	0	0	0
2013–14	Ealing Trailfinders	British and Irish Cup	2	0	0	0	0	0
2014–15	Ealing Trailfinders	National League 1	3	1	0	0	0	5

== Honours and records ==
Ealing Trailfinders

- London Division 2 North champions: 2004–05
- London 1 v South West 1 promotion playoff winners: 2006–07
- National League 3 North top try scorer: 2007–08 (20 tries)
- National League 2 South champions: 2010–11
- National League 1 champions (2): 2012–13, 2014–15

International/Representative

- Capped by England Counties XV: 2012
