= 2008–09 National Division Three South =

Rugby union competition in England

- Countries: (England)
- Champions: London Scottish
- Runners-up: Rosslyn Park (not promoted)
- Relegated: Havant, Chinnor
- Attendance: 67,085 (average 379 per match) (Note: Note that 4 home attendances are missing (see below) - so the total attendance will not be 100% accurate. The average attendance has also been taken into account with the missing games not included.)
- Highest attendance: 2,100; London Scottish v Richmond; 24 January 2009
- Lowest attendance: 75; Chinnor v Havant; 29 November 2008
- Top point scorer: (England) James Brown (London Scottish); 253 points
- Top try scorer: (England) David Howells (Ealing Trailfinders); 33 tries

The 2008–09 National Division Three South was the ninth and last season (22nd overall) of the fourth division (south) of the English domestic rugby union competition using the name National Division Three South. The division was set to be re-branded National League 2 South for the following season due to an RFU reshuffle of the entire league system. New teams to the division included Henley Hawks who were relegated from the 2007–08 National Division Two while promoted teams included Richmond (champions) and Worthing Raiders (playoffs) from London Division 1, Chinnor who returned after an absence of just one year as champions of South West Division 1 and finally Rugby Lions who were transferred from the 2008–09 National Division Three North to ensure that there was not an imbalance of teams between the two regional leagues. The league system was 4 points for a win, 2 points for a draw and additional bonus points being awarded for scoring 4 or more tries and/or losing within 7 points of the victorious team. In terms of promotion the league champions would go straight up into what would be known as National League 1 from 2009-10 but unlike previous years, there would be no promotion playoff between the runners up of the division and the runners up of National Division Three North due to the league restructuring.

London Scottish finished the season as champions and clinched the only promotion spot to the (newly named) 2009–10 National League 1. The Richmond-based side had a successful season with only one draw against Rugby Lions early on in the season blemishing what would have been a perfect record (this was achieved by Plymouth Albion back in the 2001-02 season). Fellow Londoners, runners up Rosslyn Park had a good season which could have seen them champions on any other year but they finished 22 points behind Scottish and did not have the consolation of a playoff due to the league restructuring. The two relegation spots were filled by Havant, who were the worst team in the division (ending a five-year stay in National 3 South), and Chinnor, who ranked down again but were improved from their last time spent in the division. Havant would drop to National League 3 London & South East (formerly London Division 1) while Chinnor would drop to National League 3 South West (formerly South West Division 1).

== Participating teams and locations ==
Locations of the 2008-09 National Division Three South teams
Greater London National Division Three South clubs

Team	Stadium	Capacity	City/Area
Barking	Goresbrook	1,000	Barking, London
Bridgwater & Albion	Bath Road	5,000	Bridgwater, Somerset
Canterbury	Merton Lane	1,500 (75 seats)	Canterbury, Kent
Chinnor	Kingsey Road	2,000	Thame, Oxfordshire
Dings Crusaders	Landseer Avenue	1,500	Lockleaze, Bristol
Ealing Trailfinders	Trailfinders Sports Ground	3,020	Ealing, London
Havant	Hook's Lane	2,000 (200 seats)	Havant, Hampshire
Henley Hawks	Dry Leas	4,000	Henley-on-Thames, Oxfordshire
London Scottish	Athletic Ground	4,500 (1,000 seats)	Richmond, London
Lydney	Regentsholme	3,000 (340 seats)	Lydney, Gloucestershire
Richmond	Athletic Ground	4,500 (1,000 seats)	Richmond, London
Rosslyn Park	The Rock	2,000 (630 seats)	Roehampton, London
Rugby Lions	Webb Ellis Road	4,000 (200 seats)	Rugby, Warwickshire
Worthing Raiders	Roundstone Lane	1,500 (100 seats)	Angmering, West Sussex

== Final league table ==
2008–09 National Division Three South table
Pos	Team	Pld	W	D	L	PF	PA	PD	TB	LB	Pts	Qualification
1	London Scottish (C)	26	25	1	0	1092	328	+764	18	0	120	Promoted
2	Rosslyn Park	26	22	0	4	639	338	+301	10	0	98	
3	Ealing Trailfinders	26	17	1	8	833	434	+399	17	5	92	
4	Richmond	26	15	2	9	566	510	+56	8	2	74	
5	Canterbury	26	13	1	12	658	599	+59	11	4	69	
6	Dings Crusaders	26	12	2	12	514	580	−66	5	4	61	
7	Barking	26	11	2	13	572	522	+50	6	8	59 (Note: 3 points deducted)	
8	Rugby Lions	26	10	4	12	573	653	−80	6	4	58	
9	Henley Hawks	26	10	3	13	497	553	−56	6	3	55	
10	Bridgwater & Albion	26	11	0	15	486	665	−179	4	2	49 (Note: 1 point deducted)	
11	Lydney	26	8	1	17	463	699	−236	4	7	45	
12	Worthing Raiders	26	8	1	17	471	698	−227	5	5	44	
13	Chinnor (R)	26	7	2	17	455	703	−248	3	5	40	Relegated
14	Havant (R)	26	3	0	23	345	882	−537	4	5	19 (Note: 2 points deducted)	Relegated

Updated to match(es) played on 02-05-2009. Source: Rugby Statbunker
(C) Champion; (R) Relegated

== Results ==
=== Round 1 ===
6 September 2008

Barking	12 - 12	Henley Hawks
	Report

Goresbrook
Attendance: 350
Referee: Richard Kelly

6 September 2008

Ealing Trailfinders	19 - 8	Rosslyn Park
	Report

Trailfinders Sports Ground
Attendance: 573
Referee: G O'Hara

6 September 2008

Havant	0 - 17	Richmond
	Report

Hook's Lane
Attendance: 300
Referee: Andrew Bickle

6 September 2008

(BP) London Scottish	45 - 3	Chinnor
	Report

Richmond Athletic Ground
Attendance: 700
Referee: Ross Campbell

6 September 2008

Lydney	28 - 10	Worthing Raiders
	Report

Regentsholme
Attendance: 480
Referee: Marcus Caton

6 September 2008

(BP) Rugby Lions	23 - 28	Bridgwater & Albion
	Report

Webb Ellis Road
Attendance: 459
Referee: Steve Harland

6 September 2008

Dings Crusaders	P - P	Canterbury

- Postponed. Game rescheduled to 14 March 2009.

=== Round 2 ===
13 September 2008

Bridgwater & Albion	15 - 36	London Scottish (BP)
	Report

Bath Road
Attendance: 907
Referee: Paul Kimber

13 September 2008

Canterbury	19 - 48	Ealing Trailfinders (BP)
	Report

Merton Lane
Attendance: 221
Referee: Guy Steel Bodger

13 September 2008

Chinnor	14 - 22	Henley Hawks
	Report

Kingsey Road
Attendance: 140
Referee: G O'Hara

13 September 2008

(BP) Dings Crusaders	30 - 13	Barking
	Report

Landseer Avenue
Attendance: 129
Referee: John Meredith

13 September 2008

Richmond	18 - 12	Lydney (BP)
	Report

Richmond Athletic Ground
Attendance: 775
Referee: Ross Campbell

13 September 2008

Rosslyn Park	23 - 5	Havant
	Report

The Rock
Attendance: 380
Referee: Richard Parker-Sedgmore

13 September 2008

(BP) Worthing Raiders	24 - 44	Rugby Lions (BP)
	Report

Roundstone Lane
Attendance: 300
Referee: Chris Seeley

=== Round 3 ===
20 September 2008

(BP) Barking	19 - 23	Chinnor
	Report

Goresbrook
Attendance: 200
Referee: Mike Read

20 September 2008

(BP) Ealing Trailfinders	46 - 9	Dings Crusaders
	Report

Trailfinders Sports Ground
Attendance: 350
Referee: Richard Phillips

20 September 2008

(BP) Havant	18 - 25	Canterbury
	Report

Hook's Lane
Attendance: 250
Referee: Eric Woodmason

20 September 2008

(BP) Henley Hawks	41 - 20	Bridgwater & Albion
	Report

Dry Leas
Attendance: 535
Referee: Ross Campbell

20 September 2008

(BP) London Scottish	45 - 11	Worthing
	Report

Richmond Athletic Ground
Attendance: 700
Referee: Simon McConnell

20 September 2008

Lydney	0 - 42	Rosslyn Park (BP)
	Report

Regentsholme
Attendance: 510
Referee: Mark Varnon

20 September 2008

(BP) Rugby Lions	26 - 18	Richmond
	Report

Webb Ellis Road
Attendance: 341
Referee: Andrew Bickle

=== Round 4 ===
27 September 2008

Bridgwater & Albion	25 - 20	Chinnor (BP)
	Report

Bath Road
Attendance: 462
Referee: Andrew Bickle

27 September 2008

Canterbury	19 - 16	Lydney (BP)
	Report

Merton Lane
Attendance: 215
Referee: Philip Davis

27 September 2008

(BP) Dings Crusaders	55 - 14	Havant
	Report

Landseer Avenue
Attendance: 127
Referee: Paul Kimber

27 September 2008

(BP) Ealing Trailfinders	55 - 0	Barking
	Report

Trailfinders Sports Ground
Attendance: 357
Referee: Mark Liddell

27 September 2008

Richmond	12 - 21	London Scottish
	Report

Richmond Athletic Ground
Attendance: 1,685
Referee: Nigel Higginson

27 September 2008

(BP) Rosslyn Park	53 - 6	Rugby Lions
	Report

The Rock
Attendance: 290
Referee: James Fisher

27 September 2008

(BP) Worthing Raiders	6 - 10	Henley Hawks
	Report

Roundstone Lane
Referee: Eric Woodmason

=== Round 5 ===
4 October 2008

(BP) Barking	50 - 0	Bridgwater & Albion
	Report

Goresbrook
Attendance: 150
Referee: Simon McConnell

4 October 2008

Chinnor	20 - 32	Worthing Raiders (BP)
	Report

Kingsey Road
Attendance: 97
Referee: Richard Parker-Sedgmore

4 October 2008

Havant	10 - 46	Ealing Trailfinders (BP)
	Report

Hook's Lane
Attendance: 200
Referee: Philip Davis

4 October 2008

Henley Hawks	28 - 19	Richmond
	Report

Dry Leas
Attendance: 415
Referee: Marcus Caton

4 October 2008

London Scottish	25 - 17	Rosslyn Park
	Report

Richmond Athletic Ground
Attendance: 1,200
Referee: Eric Woodmason

4 October 2008

Lydney	16 - 7	Dings Crusaders
	Report

Regentsholme
Attendance: 425
Referee: Ross Campbell

4 October 2008

Rugby Lions	20 - 32	Canterbury (BP)
	Report

Webb Ellis Road
Attendance: 268
Referee: G O'Hara

=== Round 6 ===
11 October 2008

(BP) Canterbury	28 - 43	London Scottish (BP)
	Report

Merton Lane
Attendance: 336
Referee: Paul Kimber

11 October 2008

(BP) Dings Crusaders	35 - 27	Rugby Lions
	Report

Landseer Avenue
Attendance: 176
Referee: Andrew Bickle

11 October 2008

(BP) Ealing Trailfinders	53 - 16	Lydney
	Report

Trailfinders Sports Ground
Attendance: 318
Referee: Marcus Caton

11 October 2008

(BP) Havant	11 - 18	Barking
	Report

Hook's Lane
Attendance: 220
Referee: Eric Woodmason

11 October 2008

Richmond	23 - 21	Chinnor (BP)
	Report

Richmond Athletic Ground
Attendance: 556

11 October 2008

(BP) Rosslyn Park	45 - 14	Henley Hawks
	Report

The Rock
Attendance: 380
Referee: Simon McConnell

11 October 2008

(BP) Worthing Raiders	15 - 19	Bridgwater & Albion
	Report

Roundstone Lane
Attendance: 300
Referee: Theshin Naicker

=== Round 7 ===
25 October 2008

(BP) Barking	48 - 9	Worthing Raiders
	Report

Goresbrook
Attendance: 200
Referee: Simon Harding

25 October 2008

(BP) Bridgwater & Albion	39 - 15	Richmond
	Report

Bath Road
Attendance: 746
Referee: Nigel Higginson

25 October 2008

(BP) Chinnor	11 - 18	Rosslyn Park
	Report

Kingsey Road
Attendance: 110
Referee: Steve Harland

25 October 2008

Henley Hawks	21 - 14	Canterbury (BP)
	Report

Dry Leas
Attendance: 466
Referee: Theshin Naicker

25 October 2008

(BP) London Scottish	43 - 0	Dings Crusaders
	Report

Richmond Athletic Ground
Attendance: 1,200
Referee: Gareth Hodges

25 October 2008

(BP) Lydney	29 - 22	Havant (BP)
	Report

Regentsholme
Attendance: 390
Referee: Paul Kimber

25 October 2008

Rugby Lions	18 - 18	Ealing Trailfinders
	Report

Webb Ellis Road
Attendance: 284
Referee: John Meredith

=== Round 8 ===
1 November 2008

Canterbury	10 - 10	Chinnor
	Report

Merton Lane
Attendance: 160
Referee: Simon McConnell

1 November 2008

Dings Crusaders	21 - 6	Henley Hawks
	Report

Landseer Avenue
Attendance: 210
Referee: Mark Liddell

1 November 2008

Havant	9 - 23	Rugby Lions
	Report

Hook's Lane
Attendance: 176
Referee: Mark Varnon

1 November 2008

(BP) Lydney	10 - 11	Barking
	Report

Regentsholme
Attendance: 385
Referee: Marcus Caton

1 November 2008

Richmond	19 - 5	Worthing Raiders
	Report

Richmond Athletic Ground
Attendance: 523
Referee: Richard Draper

1 November 2008

Rosslyn Park	6 - 3	Bridgwater & Albion (BP)
	Report

The Rock
Attendance: 280
Referee: Ross Campbell

2 November 2008

Ealing Trailfinders	17 - 38	London Scottish (BP)
	Report

Trailfinders Sports Ground
Attendance: 210
Referee: Keith Lewis

=== Round 9 ===
8 November 2008

(BP) Barking	8 - 11	Richmond
	Report

Goresbrook
Attendance: 150
Referee: Gareth Hodges

8 November 2008

(BP) Bridgwater & Albion	38 - 12	Canterbury
	Report

Bath Road
Attendance: 513
Referee: Nick Ashton

8 November 2008

(BP) Chinnor	14 - 20	Dings Crusaders
	Report

Kingsey Road
Attendance: 100
Referee: Ross Campbell

8 November 2008

(BP) Henley Hawks	10 - 15	Ealing Trailfinders
	Report

Dry Leas
Attendance: 387
Referee: Paul Kimber

8 November 2008

(BP) London Scottish	45 - 8	Havant
	Report

Richmond Athletic Ground
Attendance: 1,120
Referee: Eric Woodmason

8 November 2008

Rugby Lions	24 - 7	Lydney
	Report

Webb Ellis Road
Attendance: 229
Referee: Simon McConnell

8 November 2008

Worthing Raiders	7 - 41	Rosslyn Park (BP)
	Report

Roundstone Lane
Attendance: 420
Referee: Andrew Bickle

=== Round 10 ===
15 November 2008

(BP) Canterbury	35 - 17	Worthing Raiders
	Report

Merton Lane
Attendance: 211
Referee: Paul Kimber

15 November 2008

Dings Crusaders	33 - 24	Bridgwater & Albion
	Report

Landseer Avenue
Attendance: 205
Referee: Nigel Higginson

15 November 2008

(BP) Ealing Trailfinders	46 - 26	Chinnor
	Report

Trailfinders Sports Ground
Attendance: 209
Referee: Quinton Immelman

15 November 2008

Havant	5 - 34	Henley Hawks (BP)
	Report

Hook's Lane
Attendance: 182
Referee: Clare Daniels

15 November 2008

Lydney	10 - 45	London Scottish (BP)
	Report

Regentsholme
Attendance: 410
Referee: Ian Tempest

15 November 2008

Rosslyn Park	23 - 6	Richmond
	Report

The Rock
Attendance: 320

15 November 2008

Rugby Lions	17 - 14	Barking (BP)
	Report

Webb Ellis Road
Attendance: 224
Referee: James Fisher

=== Round 11 ===
29 November 2008

(BP) Barking	5 - 11	Rosslyn Park
	Report

Goresbrook
Attendance: 200
Referee: Nigel Higginson

29 November 2008

Bridgwater & Albion	17 - 39	Ealing Trailfinders (BP)
	Report

Bath Road
Attendance: 643
Referee: Cemmy Rudkin

29 November 2008

Chinnor	13 - 24	Havant (BP)
	Report

Kingsey Road
Attendance: 75
Referee: Philip Davis

29 November 2008

Henley Hawks	24 - 18	Lydney (BP)
	Report

Dry Leas
Attendance: 240
Referee: Gareth Lloyd-Jones

29 November 2008

(BP) Richmond	37 - 25	Canterbury
	Report

Richmond Athletic Ground
Attendance: 325
Referee: Quinton Immelman

29 November 2008

Rugby Lions	18 - 18	London Scottish
	Report

Webb Ellis Road
Attendance: 239
Referee: Ross Campbell

29 November 2008

Worthing Raiders	13 - 13	Dings Crusaders
	Report

Roundstone Lane
Attendance: 350
Referee: Ed Turnill

=== Round 12 ===
6 December 2008

Canterbury	12 - 27	Rosslyn Park (BP)
	Report

Merton Lane
Attendance: 204
Referee: Mark Liddell

6 December 2008

Dings Crusaders	13 - 13	Richmond
	Report

Landseer Avenue
Attendance: 176
Referee: Andrew Bickle

6 December 2008

(BP) Ealing Trailfinders	53 - 6	Worthing Raiders
	Report

Trailfinders Sports Ground
Attendance: 183
Referee: Chris Seeley

6 December 2008

(BP) Havant	39 - 25	Bridgwater & Albion
	Report

Hook's Lane
Attendance: 214
Referee: Guy Steel Bodger

6 December 2008

(BP) London Scottish	80 - 14	Barking
	Report

Richmond Athletic Ground
Attendance: 600
Referee: Mike Read

6 December 2008

Lydney	20 - 20	Chinnor
	Report

Regentsholme
Attendance: 430
Referee: Eric Woodmason

6 December 2008

Rugby Lions	20 - 20	Henley Hawks
	Report

Webb Ellis Road
Attendance: 312
Referee: James Fisher

=== Round 13 ===
20 December 2008

Barking	16 - 29	Canterbury (BP)
	Report

Goresbrook
Attendance: 300
Referee: David Walker

20 December 2008

Bridgwater & Albion	20 - 0	Lydney
	Report

Bath Road
Attendance: 793
Referee: Simon Harding

20 December 2008

Chinnor	3 - 37	Rugby Lions (BP)
	Report

Kingsey Road
Attendance: 150

20 December 2008

Henley Hawks	9 - 19	London Scottish
	Report

Dry Leas
Attendance: 580
Referee: Marcus Caton

20 December 2008

(BP) Richmond	22 - 27	Ealing Trailfinders (BP)
	Report

Richmond Athletic Ground
Attendance: 829
Referee: Tom Davis

20 December 2008

(BP) Rosslyn Park	32 - 19	Dings Crusaders
	Report

The Rock
Attendance: 330
Referee: Cemmy Rudkin

20 December 2008

Worthing Raiders	25 - 6	Havant
	Report

Roundstone Lane
Attendance: 400

=== Round 14 ===
3 January 2009

(BP) Barking	28 - 0	Dings Crusaders
	Report

Goresbrook
Attendance: 150
Referee: Marcus Caton

3 January 2009

(BP) Ealing Trailfinders	38 - 22	Canterbury
	Report

Trailfinders Sports Ground
Attendance: 287
Referee: G O'Hara

3 January 2009

Havant	P - P	Rosslyn Park

- Postponed. Game rescheduled to 17 January 2009.

3 January 2009

Henley Hawks	P - P	Chinnor

- Postponed. Game rescheduled to 14 March 2009.

3 January 2009

London Scottish	P - P	Bridgwater & Albion

- Postponed. Game rescheduled to 14 March 2009.

3 January 2009

Lydney	P - P	Richmond

- Postponed. Game rescheduled to 17 January 2009.

3 January 2009

Rugby Lions	P - P	Worthing Raiders

- Postponed. Game rescheduled to 17 January 2009.

=== Round 15 ===
10 January 2009

Bridgwater & Albion	P - P	Henley Hawks

- Postponed. Game rescheduled to 11 April 2009.

10 January 2009

Canterbury	P - P	Havant

- Postponed. Game rescheduled to 11 April 2009.

10 January 2009

Chinnor	P - P	Barking

- Postponed. Game rescheduled to 17 January 2009.

10 January 2009

Dings Crusaders	P - P	Ealing Trailfinders

- Postponed. Game rescheduled to 11 April 2009.

10 January 2009

Richmond	P - P	Rugby Lions

- Postponed. Game rescheduled to 14 March 2009.

10 January 2009

Rosslyn Park	P - P	Lydney

- Postponed. Game rescheduled to 14 March 2009.

10 January 2009

Worthing Raiders	P - P	London Scottish

- Postponed. Game rescheduled to 11 April 2009.

=== Rounds 14 & 15 (rescheduled games) ===
17 January 2009

(BP) Chinnor	30 - 22	Barking
	Report

Kingsey Road
Attendance: 78
Referee: Rowan Kitt

- Game rescheduled from 10 January 2009.

17 January 2009

(BP) Havant	13 - 18	Rosslyn Park
	Report

Hook's Lane
Attendance: 210
Referee: Lee Towers

- Game rescheduled from 3 January 2009.

17 January 2009

Lydney	8 - 27	Richmond (BP)
	Report

Regentsholme
Attendance: 320
Referee: Kevin Warwick

- Game rescheduled from 3 January 2009.

17 January 2009

Rugby Lions	15 - 12	Worthing Raiders (BP)
	Report

Webb Ellis Road
Attendance: 240
Referee: Chris Seeley

- Game rescheduled from 3 January 2009.

=== Round 16 ===
24 January 2009

Barking	27 - 8	Ealing Trailfinders
	Report

Goresbrook
Attendance: 200
Referee: James Fisher

24 January 2009

Chinnor	29 - 3	Bridgwater & Albion
	Report

Kingsey Road
Attendance: 110
Referee: Simon McConnell

24 January 2009

(BP) Havant	32 - 10	Dings Crusaders
	Report

Hook's Lane
Attendance: 182
Referee: Nick Ashton

24 January 2009

Henley Hawks	3 - 17	Worthing Raiders
	Report

Dry Leas
Attendance: 310
Referee: Adam Friend

24 January 2009

(BP) London Scottish	33 - 8	Richmond
	Report

Richmond Athletic Ground
Attendance: 2,100
Referee: Richard Parker-Sedgmore

24 January 2009

(BP) Rugby Lions	23 - 26	Rosslyn Park
	Report

Webb Ellis Road
Attendance: 275
Referee: Revis Phillips

24 January 2009

Lydney	P - P	Canterbury

- Postponed. Game rescheduled to 2 May 2009.

=== Round 17 ===
31 January 2009

Bridgwater & Albion	22 - 15	Barking (BP)
	Report

Bath Road
Attendance: 573
Referee: Andrew Bickle

31 January 2009

(BP) Canterbury	39 - 27	Rugby Lions (BP)
	Report

Merton Lane
Attendance: 200
Referee: Mark Liddell

31 January 2009

(BP) Dings Crusaders	33 - 29	Lydney (BP)
	Report

Landseer Avenue
Attendance: 146
Referee: Nick Williams

31 January 2009

(BP) Ealing Trailfinders	50 - 5	Havant
	Report

Trailfinders Sports Ground
Attendance: 117
Referee: Marcus Caton

31 January 2009

(BP) Richmond	32 - 22	Henley Hawks (BP)
	Report

Richmond Athletic Ground
Attendance: 548
Referee: Richard Kelly

31 January 2009

Rosslyn Park	7 - 18	London Scottish
	Report

The Rock
Attendance: 1,210
Referee: Paul Kimber

31 January 2009

(BP) Worthing Raiders	47 - 13	Chinnor
	Report

Roundstone Lane
Attendance: 250
Referee: Eric Woodmason

=== Round 18 ===
7 February 2009

Barking	P - P	Havant

- Postponed. Game rescheduled to 14 March 2009.

7 February 2009

Bridgwater & Albion	P - P	Worthing Raiders

- Postponed. Game rescheduled to 25 April 2009.

7 February 2009

Chinnor	P - P	Richmond

- Postponed. Game rescheduled to 11 April 2009.

7 February 2009

Henley Hawks	P - P	Rosslyn Park

- Postponed. Game rescheduled to 23 April 2009.

7 February 2009

London Scottish	P - P	Canterbury

- Postponed. Game rescheduled to 25 April 2009.

7 February 2009

Lydney	P - P	Ealing Trailfinders

- Postponed. Game rescheduled to 25 April 2009.

7 February 2009

Rugby Lions	P - P	Dings Crusaders

- Postponed. Game rescheduled to 25 April 2009.

=== Round 19 ===
14 February 2009

Canterbury	25 - 14	Henley Hawks
	Report

Merton Lane
Attendance: 180
Referee: Marcus Caton

14 February 2009

(BP) Dings Crusaders	16 - 18	London Scottish
	Report

Landseer Avenue
Attendance: 269
Referee: Gary Gordon

14 February 2009

(2BP) Ealing Trailfinders	25 - 26	Rugby Lions
	Report

Trailfinders Sports Ground
Attendance: 87
Referee: John Meredith

14 February 2009

Havant	7 - 25	Lydney
	Report

Hook's Lane
Attendance: 228
Referee: James Fisher

14 February 2009

(BP) Rosslyn Park	42 - 0	Chinnor
	Report

The Rock
Attendance: 288
Referee: Clare Daniels

14 February 2009

Worthing Raiders	23 - 19	Barking (BP)
	Report

Roundstone Lane
Attendance: 250
Referee: Ed Turnill

14 February 2009

Richmond	P - P	Bridgwater & Albion

- Postponed. Game rescheduled to 2 May 2009.

=== Round 20 ===
21 February 2009

(BP) Barking	48 - 18	Lydney
	Report

Goresbrook
Attendance: 200
Referee: Richard Parker-Sedgmore

21 February 2009

Bridgwater & Albion	15 - 25	Rosslyn Park
	Report

Bath Road
Attendance: 622
Referee: Steve Harland

21 February 2009

Chinnor	19 - 53	Canterbury (BP)
	Report

Kingsey Road
Attendance: 85
Referee: Andrew Gardner

21 February 2009

(2BP) Henley Hawks	24 - 32	Dings Crusaders (BP)
	Report

Dry Leas
Attendance: 410
Referee: Eric Woodmason

21 February 2009

London Scottish	19 - 16	Ealing Trailfinders (BP)
	Report

Richmond Athletic Ground
Attendance: 1,200
Referee: Michael Tutty

21 February 2009

Rugby Lions	31 - 10	Havant
	Report

Webb Ellis Road
Referee: Matthew Daubney

21 February 2009

(BP) Worthing Raiders	13 - 17	Richmond
	Report

Roundstone Lane
Attendance: 300
Referee: Chris Seeley

=== Round 21 ===
28 February 2009

(BP) Canterbury	27 - 11	Bridgwater & Albion
	Report

Merton Lane
Attendance: 137
Referee: Simon McConnell

28 February 2009

(BP) Dings Crusaders	15 - 19	Chinnor
	Report

Landseer Avenue
Attendance: 112
Referee: Simon Harding

28 February 2009

(BP) Ealing Trailfinders	37 - 15	Henley Hawks
	Report

Trailfinders Sports Ground
Attendance: 237
Referee: Stefano Traversi

28 February 2009

Havant	10 - 61	London Scottish (BP)
	Report

Hook's Lane
Attendance: 170
Referee: G O'Hara

28 February 2009

Lydney	24 - 23	Rugby Lions (BP)
	Report

Regentsholme
Attendance: 375
Referee: Lee Towers

28 February 2009

Richmond	18 - 18	Barking
	Report

Richmond Athletic Ground
Attendance: 423
Referee: Nick Williams

28 February 2009

Rosslyn Park	14 - 9	Worthing Raiders (BP)
	Report

The Rock
Attendance: 310
Referee: Andrea Pasquin

=== Round 22 ===
7 March 2009

Barking	31 - 10	Rugby Lions
	Report

Goresbrook
Attendance: 200
Referee: Revis Phillips

7 March 2009

(BP) Bridgwater & Albion	9 - 15	Dings Crusaders
	Report

Bath Road
Attendance: 671
Referee: Ed Turnill

7 March 2009

Chinnor	20 - 13	Ealing Trailfinders (BP)
	Report

Kingsey Road
Attendance: 102
Referee: Simon McConnell

7 March 2009

(BP) Henley Hawks	42 - 17	Havant
	Report

Dry Leas
Attendance: 270
Referee: Nigel Higginson

7 March 2009

(BP) London Scottish	76 - 11	Lydney
	Report

Richmond Athletic Ground
Attendance: 400
Referee: Cemmy Rudkin

7 March 2009

(BP) Richmond	30 - 16	Rosslyn Park
	Report

Richmond Athletic Ground
Attendance: 1,219
Referee: Richard Phillips

7 March 2009

Worthing Raiders	11 - 20	Canterbury
	Report

Roundstone Lane
Attendance: 250
Referee: Richard Parker-Sedgmore

=== Rounds 1, 14, 15 & 18 (rescheduled games) ===
14 March 2009

(BP) Barking	52 - 14	Havant
	Report

Goresbrook
Attendance: 200
Referee: Richard Parker-Sedgmore

- Game rescheduled from 7 February 2009.

14 March 2009

Dings Crusaders	25 - 20	Canterbury (BP)
	Report

Landseer Avenue
Attendance: 110
Referee: Steve Harland

- Game rescheduled from 6 September 2008.

14 March 2009

Henley Hawks	19 - 7	Chinnor
	Report

Dry Leas
Attendance: 325
Referee: Andrew Bickle

- Game rescheduled from 3 January 2009.

14 March 2009

(BP) London Scottish	52 - 7	Bridgwater & Albion
	Report

Richmond Athletic Ground
Attendance: 300
Referee: Mark Varnon

- Game rescheduled from 3 January 2009.

14 March 2009

(BP) Richmond	37 - 24	Rugby Lions (BP)
	Report

Richmond Athletic Ground
Attendance: 330
Referee: G O'Hara

- Game rescheduled from 10 January 2009.

14 March 2009

(BP) Rosslyn Park	28 - 17	Lydney
	Report

The Rock
Attendance: 187
Referee: Marcus Caton

- Game rescheduled from 10 January 2009.

=== Round 23 ===
21 March 2009

(BP) Canterbury	13 - 17	Richmond
	Report

Merton Lane
Attendance: 251
Referee: Nick Cockburn

21 March 2009

(BP) Dings Crusaders	25 - 26	Worthing Raiders
	Report

Landseer Avenue
Attendance: 172
Referee: Mick Reid

21 March 2009

(BP) Ealing Trailfinders	30 - 8	Bridgwater & Albion
	Report

Trailfinders Sports Ground
Attendance: 385
Referee: James Fisher

21 March 2009

Havant	17 - 25	Chinnor
	Report

Hook's Lane
Attendance: 126
Referee: Paul Kimber

21 March 2009

(BP) London Scottish	85 - 3	Rugby Lions
	Report

Richmond Athletic Ground
Attendance: 1,000
Referee: John Meredith

21 March 2009

(BP) Lydney	20 - 26	Henley Hawks (BP)
	Report

Regentsholme
Attendance: 418
Referee: Matthew Daubney

21 March 2009

Rosslyn Park	21 - 18	Barking (BP)
	Report

The Rock
Attendance: 190
Referee: Eric Woodmason

=== Round 24 ===
28 March 2009

(BP) Barking	19 - 21	London Scottish
	Report

Goresbrook
Attendance: 300
Referee: Nick Cockburn

28 March 2009

Bridgwater & Albion	13 - 10	Havant (BP)
	Report

Bath Road
Attendance: 397
Referee: Nick Williams

28 March 2009

(BP) Chinnor	25 - 27	Lydney (BP)
	Report

Kingsey Road
Attendance: 110
Referee: Rowan Kitt

28 March 2009

Henley Hawks	26 - 26	Rugby Lions
	Report

Dry Leas
Referee: Marcus Caton

28 March 2009

(BP) Richmond	13 - 16	Dings Crusaders
	Report

Richmond Athletic Ground
Attendance: 366
Referee: Claudio Castagnoli

28 March 2009

Rosslyn Park	26 - 6	Canterbury
	Report

The Rock
Attendance: 280
Referee: Stefano Roscini

28 March 2009

Worthing Raiders	7 - 26	Ealing Trailfinders (BP)
	Report

Roundstone Lane
Attendance: 276
Referee: Ed Turnill

=== Round 25 ===
4 April 2009

(BP) Canterbury	23 - 30	Barking (BP)
	Report

Merton Lane
Attendance: 162
Referee: Mark Liddell

4 April 2009

(BP) Dings Crusaders	14 - 16	Rosslyn Park
	Report

Landseer Avenue
Attendance: 110
Referee: B Arciero

4 April 2009

(BP) Ealing Trailfinders	51 - 10	Richmond
	Report

Trailfinders Sports Ground

4 April 2009

(BP) Havant	27 - 55	Worthing Raiders (BP)
	Report

Hook's Lane
Attendance: 283
Referee: Philip Davis

4 April 2009

(BP) London Scottish	38 - 5	Henley Hawks
	Report

Richmond Athletic Ground
Attendance: 700
Referee: Ross Campbell

4 April 2009

(BP) Lydney	41 - 12	Bridgwater & Albion
	Report

Regentsholme
Attendance: 620
Referee: Steve Harland

4 April 2009

Rugby Lions	10 - 20	Chinnor
	Report

Webb Ellis Road
Attendance: 241
Referee: Revis Phillips

=== Rounds 15 & 18 (rescheduled games) ===
11 April 2009

(BP) Bridgwater & Albion	29 - 12	Henley Hawks
	Report

Bath Road
Attendance: 421
Referee: Steve Lee

- Game rescheduled from 10 January 2009.

11 April 2009

(BP) Canterbury	75 - 0	Havant
	Report

Merton Lane
Attendance: 237
Referee: Paul Kimber

- Game rescheduled from 10 January 2009.

11 April 2009

Chinnor	21 - 35	Richmond (BP)
	Report

Kingsey Road
Attendance: 125
Referee: Marcus Caton

- Game rescheduled from 7 February 2009.

11 April 2009

Dings Crusaders	33 - 29	Ealing Trailfinders (2BP)
	Report

Landseer Avenue
Attendance: 121
Referee: Ed Gardiner

- Game rescheduled from 10 January 2009.

11 April 2009

Worthing Raiders	13 - 71	London Scottish (BP)
	Report

Roundstone Lane
Attendance: 350
Referee: Ross Campbell

- Game rescheduled from 10 January 2009.

=== Round 26 ===
18 April 2009

Bridgwater & Albion	22 - 20	Rugby Lions (BP)
	Report

Bath Road
Attendance: 487
Referee: Andrew Bickle

18 April 2009

(BP) Canterbury	24 - 8	Dings Crusaders
	Report

Merton Lane
Attendance: 301
Referee: G O'Hara

18 April 2009

(BP) Chinnor	29 - 59	London Scottish (BP)
	Report

Kingsey Road
Attendance: 250
Referee: Mark Liddell

18 April 2009

(BP) Henley Hawks	16 - 17	Barking
	Report

Dry Leas
Attendance: 395
Referee: Andrea Pasquin

18 April 2009

(BP) Richmond	47 - 12	Havant
	Report

Richmond Athletic Ground
Attendance: 382
Referee: Stefano Traversi

18 April 2009

(BP) Rosslyn Park	26 - 21	Ealing Trailfinders (BP)
	Report

The Rock
Attendance: 1,920
Referee: Marcus Caton

18 April 2009

(BP) Worthing Raiders	43 - 20	Lydney
	Report

Roundstone Lane
Attendance: 280
Referee: Paul Kimber

=== Round 18 (rescheduled games) ===
23 April 2009

(BP) Henley Hawks	22 - 28	Rosslyn Park
	Report

Dry Leas
Attendance: 360
Referee: Chris Seeley

- Game rescheduled from 7 February 2008.

25 April 2009

(BP) Bridgwater & Albion	47 - 15	Worthing Raiders
	Report

Bath Road
Attendance: 489
Referee: Chris Seeley

- Game rescheduled from 7 February 2008.

25 April 2009

(BP) London Scottish	38 - 22	Canterbury
	Report

Richmond Athletic Ground
Attendance: 1,109
Referee: Simon McConnell

- Game rescheduled from 7 February 2008.

25 April 2009

Lydney	17 - 7	Ealing Trailfinders
	Report

Regentsholme
Referee: Revis Phillips

- Game rescheduled from 7 February 2008.

25 April 2009

(BP) Rugby Lions	32 - 17	Dings Crusaders
	Report

Webb Ellis Road
Attendance: 320
Referee: Paul Kimber

- Game rescheduled from 7 February 2008.

=== Rounds 16 & 19 (rescheduled games) ===
2 May 2009

(2BP) Lydney	24 - 29	Canterbury (BP)
	Report

Regentsholme
Attendance: 470
Referee: Andrew Bickle

- Game rescheduled from 24 January 2009.

2 May 2009

(BP) Richmond	45 - 15	Bridgwater & Albion
	Report

Richmond Athletic Ground
Attendance: 358
Referee: Paul Kimber

- Game rescheduled from 14 February 2009.

== Total season attendances ==
Club	Home Games	Total	Average	Highest	Lowest	% Capacity
Barking	13	2,800	215	350	150	22%
Bridgwater & Albion	13	7,724	594	907	397	12%
Canterbury	13	2,815	217	336	137	14%
Chinnor	13	1,532	118	250	75	6%
Dings Crusaders	13	2,063	159	269	110	11%
Ealing Trailfinders	12 (Note: Missing home attendance v Richmond on 4 April 2009.)	3,313	276	573	87	9%
Havant	13	2,741	211	300	126	11%
Henley Hawks	12 (Note: Missing home attendance v Rugby Lions on 28 March 2009.)	4,693	391	580	240	10%
London Scottish	13	12,329	948	2,100	300	21%
Lydney	12	5,233	436	620	320	15%
Richmond	13	8,319	640	1,685	325	14%
Rosslyn Park	13	6,365	490	1,920	187	24%
Rugby Lions	12 (Note: Missing home attendance v Havant on 21 February 2009.)	3,432	286	459	224	7%
Worthing Raiders	12 (Note: Missing home attendance v Henley Hawks on 27 September 2008.)	3,726	311	420	250	21%

== Individual statistics ==
- Note that points scorers includes tries as well as conversions, penalties and drop goals.

=== Top points scorers ===
Rank	Player	Team	Appearances	Points
1	(England) James Brown	London Scottish	23	253
2	(England) Ben Ward	Ealing Trailfinders	26	232
3	(South Africa) Gert De Kock	Canterbury	25	223
3	(England) Mark Davies	Lydney	26	223
4	(England) Adam Westall	Dings Crusaders	22	204
5	(England) Matt Hart	Richmond	24	202
6	(England) Ben Coulson	Worthing Raiders	22	181
7	(Wales) Dylan Pugh	Rosslyn Park	21	173
8	(England) James Hawken	Rugby Lions	18	169
9	(England) Luke Cozens	Bridgwater & Albion	18	165
9	(England) David Howells	Ealing Trailfinders	21	165

=== Top try scorers ===
Rank	Player	Team	Appearances	Tries
1	(England) David Howells	Ealing Trailfinders	21	33
2	(England) Michael Melford	Canterbury	23	22
3	(England) Rory Damant	London Scottish	22	18
4	(England) Charles Broughton	London Scottish	15	15
5	(Wales) Gareth Swailes	London Scottish	16	12
5	(England) Roman Piotrowski	London Scottish	23	12
6	(England) Frankie Neale	London Scottish	14	11
6	(England) Owen Bruynseels	Ealing Trailfinders	20	11
6	(England) Pat Sykes	Canterbury	23	11
7	(England) Kiba Richards	Ealing Trailfinders	11	10
7	(England) Ade Hales	Rugby Lions	19	10
7	(England) Nick Canty	Rosslyn Park	22	10
7	(England) Chris Simmons	Rosslyn Park	22	10
7	(England) Peter Hodgkinson	Ealing Trailfinders	23	10
7	(England) Scott Shaw	Barking	23	10

== Season records ==
=== Team ===
Largest home win — 82 pts

85 - 3 London Scottish at home to Rugby Lions on 21 March 2009

Largest away win — 58 pts

71 - 13 London Scottish away to Worthing Raiders on 11 April 2009

Most points scored — 85 pts

85 - 3 London Scottish at home to Rugby Lions on 21 March 2009

Most tries in a match — 12

London Scottish at home to Barking on 6 December 2008

Most conversions in a match — 10

London Scottish at home to Barking on 6 December 2008

Most penalties in a match — 6 (x3)

Rugby Lions at home to Bridgwater & Albion on 6 September 2008
Richmond at home to Lydney on 13 September 2008
Lydney away to Henley Hawks on 29 November 2008

Most drop goals in a match — 2

Lydney at home to Worthing Raiders on 6 September 2008

=== Player ===
Most points in a match — 28

(England) Ben Ward for Ealing Trailfinders at home to Lydney on 11 October 2008

Most tries in a match — 5

(England) David Howells for Ealing Trailfinders away to Bridgwater & Albion on 29 November 2008

Most conversions in a match — 10

(England) James Brown for London Scottish at home to Barking on 6 December 2008

Most penalties in a match — 6 (x2)

(England) Matt Goode for Rugby Lions at home to Bridgwater & Albion on 6 September 2008
(England) Mart Hart for Richmond at home to Lydney on 13 September 2008

Most drop goals in a match — 2

(England) Mark Davies for Lydney at home to Worthing Raiders on 6 September 2008

=== Attendances ===
Highest — 2,100

London Scottish at home to Richmond on 24 January 2009

Lowest — 75

Chinnor at home to Havant on 29 November 2008

Highest Average Attendance — 948

London Scottish

Lowest Average Attendance — 118

Chinnor

== See also ==
- English rugby union system
- Rugby union in England
