= Gert De Kock =

South African rugby union footballer

- Born: 19 April 1980 (age 46)

Rugby union career
- Position(s): Fly-half, Full-back
Senior career
Years	Team	Apps	(Points)
2003-05	Westcombe Park	46	(140)
2005-11	Canterbury		

Gert De Kock (born 1980) is a retired South African rugby union player who played at Fly-half or Full-back. A highly skilled player that could both kick points and score tries, he became one of the top try scorers in National League 2 South history, with 80 tries scored during his spells playing for Westcombe Park and Canterbury.

== Career ==
=== Westcombe Park ===
In 2003-04 Gert had an outstanding debut season with Westcombe Park, scoring 19 tries in just 22 games to finish as top try scorer in a Park side that finished 9th in National Division 3 South. A second season with the Orpington based side was not as successful for him with only 7 league tries but he did play a role in a successful Powergen Cup run which saw Westcombe Park reach the 5th round, ultimately losing to second division side, Otley, 16-45, away to the Yorkshire side.

=== Canterbury ===
In the summer of 2005, after two seasons with Westcombe Park, Gert would drop a division to play for fellow Kent club, Canterbury and he got off to a good start as Canterbury claimed a league and cup double by first winning promotion from London Division 1 and then retaining the Kent Cup by beating Blackheath. The 2006-07 season would be Canterbury's first ever in National Division 3 South but despite being a newly promoted side the club took it in their stride, finishing 4th in the final league standings, as well as winning the Kent Cup once more. Gert, who had experience of the league from his time with Westcombe Park, struck up a good partnership with team-mate Michael Melford and the two players shared 36 tries between them, with Gert getting 20, resulting in him becoming the 4th most prolific try scorer in the division that season. 2007-08 would see Canterbury maintain their position in the division with another 4th-place finish. Gert also started to share kicking duties with team-mate, Sam Rasch, and scored 121 points that year, including 14 tries. The club would also claim their fourth successive Kent Cup at the end of the season. 2008-09 would see Canterbury drop one position to 5th in the league standings with Gert becoming the main kicker at the club and ending up with a career best tally of 223 points for the season, making him the 3rd top points scorer in the division that year.

After a relatively uneventful 2009-10 in which Canterbury finished 7th, the 2010-11 season would be a difficult one for the club. Gert featured in almost every game that year but was unable to prevent the club sliding into the relegation zone. The relegation battle actually went down to the last game of the season when Gert's former team, Westcombe Park, came up to Merton Park for the sides rescheduled league fixture on 7 May 2011. Unfortunately for Canterbury, Westcombe Park got a couple of late tries to win the game by 25 points to 18. The result meant that Westcombe Park leap-frogged Canterbury to remain safe by just 1 point, while Canterbury would drop down to National League 3 London & SE.

== Season-by-season playing stats ==
Season	Club	Competition	Appearances	Tries	Drop Goals	Conversions	Penalties	Total Points
2003-04	Westcombe Park	National Division 3 South	22	19	0	0	0	95
2004-05	Westcombe Park	National Division 3 South	20	7	0	0	0	35
2004-05	Westcombe Park	Powergen Cup	4	2	0	0	0	10
2005-06	Canterbury	London Division 1	?	?	?	?	?	?
2005-06	Canterbury	EDF Energy Trophy	3	0	0	0	0	0
2006-07	Canterbury	National Division 3 South	26	20	0	0	0	100
2006-07	Canterbury	EDF Energy Trophy	2	0	0	0	0	0
2007-08	Canterbury	National Division 3 South	25	14	0	12	9	121
2008-09	Canterbury	National Division 3 South	25	9	0	56	22	223
2008-09	Canterbury	EDF Energy Trophy	2	1	0	3	0	11
2009-10	Canterbury	National League 2 South	20	6	0	6	1	45
2010-11	Canterbury	National League 2 South	28	5	1	0	0	28

== Honours & Records ==
Westcombe Park

- National Division 3 South top try scorer: 2003-04 (19 tries)

Canterbury

- London Division 1 champions: 2005-06
- Kent Cup winners (3): 2006, 2007, 2008
