= Lisiate Tafa =

Tonga international rugby union player

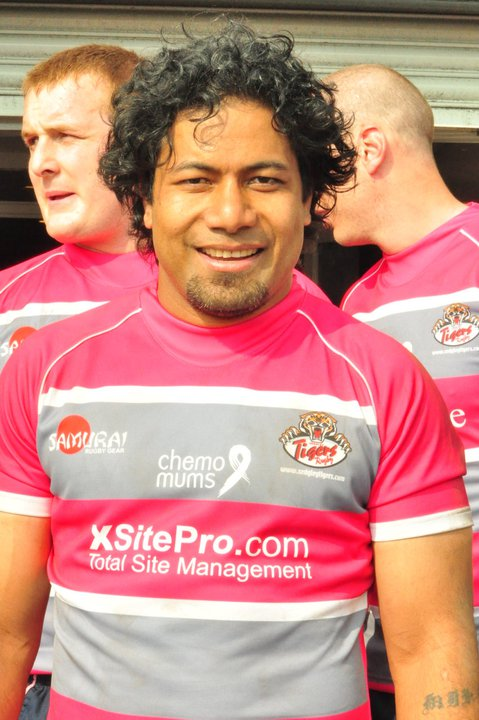
- Born: Lisiate Tafa; 10 October 1979 (age 47) Pangai, Tonga
- Height: 5 ft 11 in (1.80 m)
- Weight: 15 st 2 lb (96 kg)
- School: Taufa'ahau Pilolevu College

Rugby union career
- Position: outside centre
- Current team: Bradford & Bingley
Senior career
Years	Team	Apps	(Points)
2003-04	Lavengamalie		
2004-05	Bradford & Bingley	28	(70)
2005-06	Derby		
2006-07	Hertford		
2007-08	Bradford & Bingley	25	(60)
2008-12	Sedgley Park	54	(25)
2013-	Bradford & Bingley		
International career
Years	Team	Apps	(Points)
2003, 2007	Tonga	3	(0)

Lisiate Tafa (born 10 October 1979 in Ha'apai, Tonga) is an inside/outside center and utility who plays rugby union football for English club Sedgley Park in the National One Division and Tonga. He has played for Sedgley Park in 2008-9, 2009–10, 2010–11, 2011-12. He is well known for his speed, tactical play and ability to break tackles.

Tafa originally made a name for himself with Bradford and Bingley RFC, when he made his début in the English game in the 2004–5 season. At that time Bradford and Bingley were in National 3 North. At the end of the season, Tafa moved to Derby RFC for 2005-6, and to Hertford RFC for the 2006-7 season.

He returned to Tonga in February 2007 to play at International level for Tautahi Gold, and Tonga's national team, Ikale Tahi, in the 2007 Pacific Cup

When Tafa returned to Bradford and Bingley's Wagon Lane for the 2007-8 season, his reasons were simple. "I married a local girl, Melissa," said the 27-year-old. The couple met in his first year at Bradford and Bingley in 2004.

Tafa recently played for the Australia XV team alongside fellow Tongan, George Smith, in the Southern Hemisphere Charity Fundraiser against the Pacific Barbarians, held on 6 March 2011.

As of 2015 he has 3 caps for Tonga as well as 15 caps for Tonga 'A'.
