= Mark Billings =

- Born: 13 April 1987 (age 39)

Rugby union career
- Position(s): Wing, Full back
- Current team: Rochford Hundred
Senior career
Years	Team	Apps	(Points)
2005–16	Southend	250	(518)
2016–	Rochford Hundred	12	(20)
- Correct as of 30 April 2016

Mark Billings (born 1987) is an English rugby union player-coach who plays either on the Wing or as Full back. He has spent the bulk of his career at Southend, where he was club captain, and regular appearances for his club resulted in Billings becoming one of the top try scorers in National League 2 South history, with almost 90 tries in the competition. He is currently employed as a player-coach for Rochford Hundred. He has also made a number of appearances for Hawkwell vets 7 a side football team on a Wednesday night to reasonable success.

== Career ==
Starting his career with Southend in 2005, Billings made 18 appearances and scored 6 tries in his debut season for the Essex club as they finished fifth in National Division 3 South. In the 2006–07 season Billings contributed 11 tries from 21 appearances in what was one of the best seasons in Southend's history as they won the National Division 3 South title and promotion to National Division Two. After a couple of seasons in tier 2, Southend were relegated back to tier 4 in 2009, coming 12th in the league, some way off safety. Despite 2008–09 being a poor season for the club, in February 2009, Billings was called up for the England Counties XV squad to play France Federale at Twickenham Stadium.

Following relegation, Billings remained with the Essex club and during 2010–11 had the best try-scoring form of his career with 15 tries in 29 appearances for a Southend side that finished 4th in a competitive National League 2 South that featured teams such as Ealing Trailfinders, Jersey and Richmond. By 2014–15 Billings was captaining a Southend side that only just survived relegation thanks to a losing bonus point in their final game against Redruth, which tied them level with Lydney who went down instead due to having a poorer overall record. The next season Southend were unable to survive as they were relegated in 15th place, some 20 off safety. In the summer of 2016 Billings left to join another Essex club, Rochford Hundred, playing several divisions below Southend in London 2 North East, to take up a position as player-coach.

== Season-by-season playing stats ==
Season	Club	Competition	Appearances	Tries	Drop Goals	Conversions	Penalties	Total Points
2005–06	Southend	National Division 3 South	18	6	0	0	0	30
2005–06	Southend	EDF Energy Trophy	1	0	0	0	0	0
2006–07	Southend	National Division 3 South	21	11	0	0	0	55
2007–08	Southend	National Division 2	16	6	0	0	0	30
2007–08	Southend	EDF Energy Trophy	1	0	0	0	0	0
2008–09	Southend	National Division 2	17	4	0	0	0	20
2008–09	Southend	EDF Energy Trophy	2	0	0	0	0	0
2009–10	Southend	National League 2 South	26	10	0	0	0	50
2010–11	Southend	National League 2 South	29	15	0	1	3	86
2011–12	Southend	National League 2 South	23	7	0	0	0	35
2012–13	Southend	National League 2 South	18	14	0	0	0	70
2013–14	Southend	National League 2 South	29	14	0	4	0	78
2014–15	Southend	National League 2 South	24	6	0	1	0	32
2015–16	Southend	National League 2 South	25	6	0	1	0	32
2016–17	Rochford Hundred	London 2 North East	12	4	0	0	0	20

== Honours and records ==
Southend

- National Division 3 South champions: 2006–07

International/Representative

- Called up for England Counties XV: 2009
