= Michael Melford (rugby union) =

English rugby union footballer (born 1984)

- Born: 30 July 1984 (age 42)
- University: Loughborough University

Rugby union career
- Position: Wing
Senior career
Years	Team	Apps	(Points)
2005–13	Canterbury	?	(?)
- Correct as of 11 May 2013

Michael Melford (born 1984) is a retired English rugby union player who plays as a winger. He has spent most of his semi-professional rugby career with Canterbury during the most successful spell of the clubs career to date, which included a spell as club captain. With over 90 tries for his club in National League 2 South alone, he has become one of the most prolific try scorers in the competition's history. He currently runs a personal training business in Chatham, Kent.

== Career ==
=== Rise and Fall of Canterbury ===
After graduating from Loughborough University, Mike joined Canterbury in Kent in 2005, where he enjoyed a successful first season at the club as they won both the London Division 1 league title and retained the Kent Cup. The 2006–07 season saw the club finish 4th in National Division 3 South (excellent for a promoted side) with Mike playing all 26 games, scoring 16 tries in the process. The club also won the Kent Cup for the third year running, with Mike featuring as his side defeated Blackheath 41–27 in the final held at Maidstone rugby club. The next season finished in much the same way, with Canterbury once again finishing 4th in the league and winning the Kent Cup for the fourth year running.

The 2008–09 season saw Mike have one of his most prolific spells of his career with the club as he finished the second highest try scorer in the division with 22 tries from just 23 games, with Canterbury finishing 5th in the league. After a fairly low-key 2009–10 season, 2011–12 proved to be bittersweet for Mike.On the one hand he managed a career best total of 23 tries in National 3 South, but on the other it was for a relegated side as Canterbury went down at the end of the season, losing their final game at home to relegation rivals Westcombe Park, 18–25, condemning them to the drop, just 1 point off safety. At the end of the season Mike's try scoring exploits would lead him to be called up for the Kent county team taking part in the 2011 County Championships, although this too was a disappointment as Kent were relegated from Division 1 of the competition.

=== Return to the National Leagues ===
Although Canterbury were relegated from the National Leagues, Mike stayed at the club and was made captain in June 2011, replacing Chris Hinkins who became player-coach. His debut season as captain was a successful one as Canterbury took National League 3 South-West by storm, winning 24 out of 26 games to win the league title and promotion back to National League 2 South. The 2012–13 season would be his last with Canterbury as the newly promoted side finished mid-table, with Mike scoring 5 tries from 19 appearances to bow out after 8 seasons with the club.

== Season-by-season playing stats ==
Season	Club	Competition	Appearances	Tries	Drop Goals	Conversions	Penalties	Total Points
2005–06	Canterbury	London Division 1	?	?	?	?	?	?
2006–07	Canterbury	National Division 3 South	26	16	0	0	0	80
2006–07	Canterbury	EDF Energy Trophy	2	1	0	0	0	5
2007–08	Canterbury	National Division 3 South	25	15	0		0	75
2007–08	Canterbury	EDF Energy Trophy	2	1	0	0	0	10
2008–09	Canterbury	National Division 3 South	23	22	0	0	0	110
2008–09	Canterbury	EDF Energy Trophy	2	1	0	0	0	5
2009–10	Canterbury	National League 2 South	26	11	0	0	0	55
2010–11	Canterbury	National League 2 South	29	23	0	0	0	115
2011–12	Canterbury	National League 3 London & SE	?	?	?	?	?	?
2012–13	Canterbury	National League 2 South	19	5	0	0	0	25

== Honours and records ==
Canterbury

- National League 3 London & SE champions (2): 2005–06, 2011–12
- Kent Cup winners (3): 2006, 2007, 2008

Kent

- Called up for County Championships: 2011

International/Representative

- Capped by England Universities
