= National League 2 South =

Level four rugby union league in England

- Sport: Rugby union
- Instituted: 1987
- Ceased: 2022
- Number of teams: 16
- Country: England
- Holders: Esher (2nd title) (2021–22 promoted to National One)
- Most titles: Barking; Henley Hawks; Cambridge; Esher (2 titles)
- Website: clubs.rfu.com
- Promotion to: National League 1
- Relegation to: South West Premier; London & South East Premier

National League 2 South (known before September 2009 as National Division Three South) was a level four league in the English rugby union system until the end of season 2021–22. It was one of two leagues at this level, with its counterpart, National League 2 North, covering the north of England. The format of the league was changed at the beginning of the 2009–10 season following reorganisation by the Rugby Football Union. The champions were promoted to National League 1. The runner-up play in a promotion play-off with the runner-up of National League 2 North; the team with the best record having home advantage. The bottom three teams were relegated, to either South West Premier or London & South East Premier. Esher are the current and final champions.

The 2019–20 season ended before all the matches were completed because of the coronavirus pandemic and the RFU used a best playing record formula to decide the final table. Due to the ongoing pandemic, the 2020–21 season was cancelled.

The Rugby Football Union (RFU) approved a new structure for the National Leagues from the 2022–23 season. Along with National League 1 and National League 2 North the size of the leagues at levels 3 and 4 are reduced to 14 teams (previously 16), there will be a two-week break over Christmas and protected weekend breaks through the season. The competition structure will be reviewed every three years. As part of the restructure a third league was created at level four and most of the National League 2 South teams were placed into either National League 2 East or National League 2 West.

== Final season ==
Eleven of the teams listed below participated in the 2019–20 National League 2 South season. The 2019–20 champions Taunton Titans and Tonbridge Juddians, who won the (virtual) promotion play-off against Caldy, were promoted into the 2021–22 National League 1, while Canterbury were relegated into the division from the 2019–20 National League 1. Sides relegated from the 2019–20 National League 2 South included Sutton & Epsom (to London & SE Premier), Bournemouth and Old Redcliffians (both to South West Premier).

The promoted teams were Barnstaple who come up as champions of South West Premier while Rochford Hundred (champions) and Guernsey Raiders (virtual play-off) came up from London & South East Premier. Hinckley were level transferred into the division from National League 2 North in order to address an imbalance of teams in National 2, with Taunton and Tonbridge Juddians being promoted and only Canterbury dropping down from National League 1.

Fifteen of the sixteen teams from 2021–22 were placed into one of the other level-four leagues for 2022–23. Barnes, Bury St. Edmunds, Canterbury, Guernsey Raiders, Henley Hawks, Old Albanian, Rochford Hundred, Westcliff and Worthing Raiders were transferred to the newly created National League 2 East while Barnstaple, Clifton, Dings Crusaders, Hinckley, Leicester Lions and Redruth were transferred to another new level-four league, National League 2 West. The 2021–22 champions, Esher, were promoted to National League 1. No teams were relegated to level five.

Team	Stadium	Capacity	City/Area	Previous season
Barnes	Barn Elms	500	Barnes, London	12th
Barnstaple	Pottingham Road	2,000 (575 seats)	Barnstaple, Devon	Promoted from South West Premier (champions)
Bury St Edmunds	The Haberden	3,000 (135 seats)	Bury St Edmunds, Suffolk	6th
Canterbury	Marine Travel Ground	1,500 (75 seats)	Canterbury, Kent	Relegated from 2019–20 National League 1 (15th)
Clifton	Station Road	2,500 (400 seats)	Cribbs Causeway, Patchway, Bristol	5th
Dings Crusaders	Shaftsbury Park	2,250 (250 seats)	Frenchay, Bristol	11th
Esher	Molesey Road	3,500	Hersham, Surrey	8th
Guernsey Raiders	Footes Lane	5,000 (720 seats)	Saint Peter Port, Guernsey	Promoted from London & South East Premier (virtual play-off)
Henley Hawks	Dry Leas	4,000	Henley-on-Thames, Oxfordshire	4th
Hinckley	De Montfort Park	2,000	Hinckley, Leicestershire	Level-transfer from National 2 North (3rd)
Leicester Lions	Westleigh Park	2,000	Blaby, Leicestershire	7th
Old Albanian	Woollam's Playing Fields	1,000	St Albans, Hertfordshire	10th
Redruth	The Recreation Ground	3,500 (580 seats)	Redruth, Cornwall	3rd
Rochford Hundred	The Rugby Park	1,000	Hawkwell, Rochford, Essex	Promoted from London & South East Premier (champions)
Westcliff	The Gables	1,000	Eastwood, Essex	13th
Worthing Raiders	Roundstone Lane	1,500 (100 seats)	Angmering, West Sussex	9th

Locations of the 2021–22 National League 2 South teams

== 2020–21 ==
Due to the coronavirus pandemic, the 2020–21 season was cancelled.

== List of champions ==
=== Area League South ===
Area League South honours
Season	No of teams	No of matches	Champions	Runner-up	Relegated team(s)	Ref
1987–88	11	10	Askeans	Sidcup	Streatham/Croydon	
1988–89	11	10	Lydney	Havant	Sidcup, Stroud, Ealing	
1989–90	11	10	Metropolitan Police	Clifton	Salisbury	

=== National 4 South ===
National 4 South honours
Season	No of teams	No of matches	Champions	Runner-up	Relegated team(s)	Ref
1990–91	13	12	Redruth	Basingstoke	Cheltenham, Maidenhead	
1991–92	13	12	Havant	Basingstoke	Ealing, Sidcup	
1992–93	13	12	Sudbury	London Welsh	Multiple (Note: This year there was a league restructure with a new league (Courage National League 4) becoming the new tier 4. Courage National 4 would contain the previous season's top teams from National 4 North and National 4 South with the remaining teams joining lower tier teams as part of Courage League Division 5 (which retained the North/South divisions). This structure would continue for several years before being abolished at the end of 1996 where the league would revert to the old system.)	

=== National Division 4 ===
National Division 4 honours
Season	No of teams	No of matches	Champions	Runner-up	Relegated team(s)	Ref
1993–94	10	18	Clifton	Harrogate	Sheffield (to 5 North) and Sudbury (to 5 South) (Note: This year there was a league restructure with a new league (Courage National League 4) becoming the new tier 4. Courage National 4 would contain the previous season's top teams from National 4 North and National 4 South with the remaining teams joining lower tier teams as part of Courage League Division 5 (which retained the North/South divisions). This structure would continue for several years before being abolished at the end of 1996 where the league would revert to the old system.)	
1994–95	10	18	Rotherham	Reading	Askeans (to 5 South) and Broughton Park (to 5 North)	
1995–96	10	18	Exeter	London Welsh (Note: The top eight teams were all promoted to the re-organised, sixteen team, Courage League Division 3 for season 1996–97)	Aspatria (to 4 North) and Plymouth Albion (to 4 South)	

=== Division 4 South ===
Division 4 South honours
Season	No of teams	No of matches	Champions	Runner-up	Relegated team(s)	Ref
1996–97	14	26	Newbury	Henley	Askeans, Charlton Park, High Wycombe, Berry Hill	

=== National 2 South ===
National 2 South honours
Season	No of teams	No of matches	Champions	Runner-up	Relegated team(s)	Ref
1997–98	14	26	Camberley	Henley	No relegation	
1998–99	14	26	Bracknell	Esher	Havant	
1999–00	14	26	Esher	Penzance & Newlyn	Metropolitan Police, Norwich, Bridgwater & Albion	

=== National Division 3 South ===
National Division 3 South honours
Season	No of teams	No of matches	Champions	Runner-up	Relegated team(s)	Ref
2000–01	14	26	Plymouth Albion	Launceston	Cheltenham, Basingstoke, Weston-super-Mare, Reading	
2001–02	14	26	Penzance & Newlyn	Launceston	Cinderford, Clifton	
2002–03	14	26	Rosslyn Park	Lydney	Camberley, Havant	
2003–04	14	26	Blackheath	Launceston	Old Colfeians, Basingstoke	
2004–05	14	26	Barking	Redruth	Haywards Heath, Tabard, Weston-super-Mare	
2005–06	14	26	Cambridge	North Walsham	Bracknell, Reading	
2006–07	14	26	Southend	Westcombe Park	Chinnor, Old Patesians, Hertford	
2007–08	14	26	Mount's Bay	Cinderford	Luton, North Walsham, Clifton	
2008–09	14	26	London Scottish	Rosslyn Park	Havant, Chinnor	

=== National League 2 South ===
National League 2 South honours
Season	No of teams	No of matches	Champions	Runner-up	Relegated team(s)	Ref
2009–10	15	28	Barking	Rosslyn Park	Bridgwater & Albion, Barnes	(Note: Mounts Bay were originally scheduled to participate in the 2009–10 season after being demoted at the end of the previous season but folded in July 2009. As they were unable to participate, the division went ahead with fifteen teams instead of the expected sixteen.)
2010–11	16	30	Ealing Trailfinders	Jersey	Newbury, Hinckley, Canterbury	
2011–12	16	30	Old Albanian	Richmond	Barnes, Hertford, Westcombe Park	
2012–13	15	28	Henley Hawks	Worthing Raiders	Barking, Lydney	(Note: Rugby Lions were on the original 2012–13 fixture list after winning promotion from National League 3 Midlands but during July 2012 they went into liquidation and were unable to participate in the division, leaving fifteen teams instead of the usual sixteen.)
2013–14	16	30	Hartpury College	Ampthill & District	Exmouth, Bournemouth, London Irish Wild Geese	
2014–15	16	30	Henley Hawks	Bishop's Stortford	Dings Crusaders, Shelford, Lydney	
2015–16	16	30	Cambridge	Old Albanian	Launceston, Southend Saxons, Dorking	
2016–17	16	30	Bishop's Stortford	Old Elthamians	Exmouth, Barnes (Note: Due to London Welsh being expelled from the RFU Championship in January 2017 only 5 teams would be relegated from National League 2 North and National League South instead of the usual 6 - meaning that the 14th placed side in one of the leagues would be safe. In the end 14th placed Barnstaple (National League 2 South) gained more points (51) than 14th placed Harrogate (47) (National League 2 North) condemning them to the drop instead.)	
2017–18	16	30	Cinderford	Chinnor	Broadstreet, Wimbledon, Barnstaple	
2018–19	16	30	Rams	Canterbury	London Irish Wild Geese, Guernsey, Birmingham & Solihull	
2019–20	16	25 (Note: Due to the COVID-19 pandemic in the United Kingdom the RFU cancelled all rugby below the Premiership with most clubs in National League 2 South having played 25 games, and a best playing record formula was used to decide the final table.)	Taunton Titans	Tonbridge Juddians	Bournemouth, Old Redcliffians, Sutton & Epsom	
2020–21	16		Cancelled due to the coronavirus pandemic			
2021–22	16	30	Esher	Redruth	No relegation due to tier 3 and 4 league reorganisation	
Green background are promotion places.

== National Two promotion play-offs ==
Until the 2021–22 season there was a promotion play-off between the league runners-up of National League 2 North and National League 2 South for the third and final promotion place to National League 1. The team with the superior league record has home advantage. As of the end of the 2019–20 season the southern teams have been more successful with fourteen wins to the northern teams four, while the home side has won thirteen teams to the away sides five.

National Two promotion play-off results
Season	Home team	Score	Away team	Venue	Attendance
2000–01	Sedgley Park (N)	40–23	Launceston (S)	Park Lane, Whitefield, Greater Manchester	1,500
2001–02	Launceston (S)	26–0	Dudley Kingswinford (N)	Polson Bridge, Launceston, Cornwall	2,500
2002–03	Lydney (S)	21–7	New Brighton (N)	Regentsholme, Lydney, Gloucestershire	
2003–04	Halifax (N)	16–18	Launceston (S)	Ovenden Park, Halifax, West Yorkshire	
2004–05	Redruth (S)	33–14	Macclesfield (N)	The Recreation Ground, Redruth, Cornwall	4,000
2005–06	North Walsham (S)	5–15	Nuneaton (N)	Norwich Road, Scottow, Norfolk	1,302
2006–07	Westcombe Park (S)	36–20	Tynedale (N)	Goddington Dene, Orpington, Greater London	1,700
2007–08	Cinderford (S)	15–14	Darlington Mowden Park (N)	Dockham Road, Cinderford, Gloucestershire	2,800
2008–09	No promotion play-off due to the restructuring of the English rugby union league system. Only the champions of the two divisions were promoted.				
2009–10	Loughborough Students (N)	21–43	Rosslyn Park (S)	Loughborough University Stadium, Loughborough, Leicestershire	1,000
2010–11	Jersey (S)	30–5	Loughborough Students (N)	St. Peter, Saint Peter, Jersey	3,100
2011–12	Richmond (S)	20–13 (aet)	Caldy (N)	Athletic Ground, Richmond, Greater London	1,600
2012–13	Stourbridge (N)	26–28	Worthing Raiders (S)	Stourton Park, Stourbridge, West Midlands	925
2013–14	Darlington Mowden Park (N)	30–28 (aet)	Ampthill (S)	The Northern Echo Arena, Darlington, County Durham	975
2014–15	Ampthill (N)	19–10	Bishop's Stortford (S)	Dillingham Park, Ampthill, Bedfordshire	1,253
2015–16	Old Albanian (S)	24–0	Sedgley Park (N)	Woollam Playing Fields, St Albans, Hertfordshire	473
2016–17	Sale FC (N)	14–19	Old Elthamians (S)	Heywood Road, Sale, Greater Manchester	1,297
2017–18	Chinnor (S)	40–31	Sedgley Park (N)	Kingsey Road, Thame, Oxfordshire	1,378
2018–19	Canterbury (S)	19–10	Chester (N)	The Marine Travel Ground, Canterbury, Kent	1,114
2019–20	Cancelled due to COVID-19 pandemic in the United Kingdom. Best ranked runner up – Tonbridge Juddians (S) promoted.				
2020–21	Cancelled due to COVID-19 pandemic in the United Kingdom.				
2021–22	Cancelled due to tier 3 and 4 league reorganisation.				
Green background represent promoted teams. (N) stands for National League 2 North while (S) stands for National League 2 South.

== Number of league titles ==
- Barking (2)
- Cambridge (2)
- Esher (2)
- Henley Hawks (2)
- Askeans (1)
- Bishop's Stortford (1)
- Blackheath (1)
- Bracknell (1)
- Camberley (1)
- Cinderford (1)
- Clifton (1) (Note: Clifton's league title was won during the period when tier 4 was a single national league (1993-96).)
- Ealing Trailfinders (1)
- Exeter (1) (Note: Exeter's league title was won during the period when tier 4 was a single national league (1993-96).)
- Hartpury College (1)
- Havant (1)
- London Scottish (1)
- Lydney (1)
- Metropolitan Police (1)
- Mount's Bay (1)
- Newbury (1)
- Old Albanian (1)
- Penzance & Newlyn (1) (Note: Penzance & Newlyn are now known as the Cornish Pirates.)
- Plymouth Albion (1)
- Rams (1)
- Redruth (1)
- Rosslyn Park (1)
- Southend (1)
- Sudbury (1)
- Taunton Titans (1)

== League format since 1987 ==
Format of fourth tier rugby union leagues in England
Year	Name	No of teams	No of matches
1987–93	Area League North; Area League South	11	10
1993–96	National Division Four	10	18
1996–97	National Four North; National Four South	14	26
1997–00	National Division 2 North; National Division 2 South	14	26
2000–09	National Division Three North; National Division Three South	14	26
2009–22	National League 2 North; National League 2 South	16	30
2022–	National Two East; National Two North; National Two West	14	26

== Records ==
Note that all records are from 1996–97 season onwards as this is widely held as the dawn of professionalism across the English club game. It also offers a better comparison between seasons as the division team numbers are roughly equal (for example when league rugby union first started in 1987–88 the southern league had only 11 teams playing 10 games each, compared to 14 teams in 1996–97 playing 26 games (home & away), going up to 16 teams in 2009–10 playing 30 games each). Attendance records are from 2000 onwards unless otherwise specified. All records are up to date up till the end of the 2018–19 season.

=== League records ===
- Most titles: 2

Barking (2004–05, 2009–10)
Henley Hawks (2012–13, 2014–15)
Cambridge (2005–06, 2015–16)

- Most times promoted from division: 3

Henley Hawks (1997–98, 2012–13, 2014–15)

- Most times relegated from division: 3

Havant (1998–99, 2002–03, 2008–09)
Barnes (2009–10, 2011–12, 2016–17)

- Most league points in a season: 143

Cinderford (2017–18)

- Fewest league points in a season: 0

Metropolitan Police (1999–00)
Camberley (2002–03)

- Most points scored in a season: 1,490

Ealing Trailfinders (2010–11)

- Fewest points scored in a season: 270

Camberley (2002–03)

- Most points conceded in a season: 2,055

Newbury Blues (2010–11)

- Fewest points conceded in a season: 240

Plymouth Albion (2000–01)

- Best points difference (For/Against): 1,066

Ealing Trailfinders (2010–11)

- Worst points difference (For/Against):-1,676

Newbury Blues (2010–11)

- Most games won in a season: 29

Cinderford (2017–18)

- Most games lost in a season: 29

Newbury Blues (2010–11)
Launceston (2015–16)

- Most games drawn in a season: 4

Rugby Lions (2008–09)
Barnes (2015–16)

- Most bonus points in a season: 30

Bishop's Stortford (2014–15)

=== Match records ===
- Largest home win: 132 – 0

Old Albanian at home to Newbury Blues on 26 March 2011 (2010–11)

- Largest away win: 85 – 3

Henley Hawks away to Barking on 27 October 2012 (2012–13)

- Most points scored in a match: 132

Old Albanian at home to Newbury Blues on 26 March 2011 (2010–11)

- Most tries scored in a match: 20

Jersey at home to Newbury Blues on 6 November 2011 (2010–11)
Ealing Trailfinders at home to Hinckley on 12 March 2011 (2010–11)
Old Albanian at home to Newbury Blues on 26 March 2011 (2010–11)

- Most conversions scored in a match: 16

Old Albanian at home to Newbury Blues on 26 March 2011 (2010–11)
Ealing Trailfinders at home to Lydney on 30 April 2011 (2010–11)

- Most penalties scored in a match: 7

Blackheath at home to Redruth on 14 December 2002 (2002–03)
Hertford at home to Rosslyn Park on 30 September 2006 (2006–07)
Clifton at home to Lydney on 21 October 2006 (2006–07)
Dings Crusaders at home to Southend on 6 November 2011 (2010–11)
Launceston at home to Hartpury College on 28 September 2013 (2013–14)
Launceston away to Dings Crusaders on 27 September 2014 (2014–15)

- Most drop kicks scored in a match: 3

Westcombe Park at home to Ealing Trailfinders on 5 December 2009 (2009–10)

=== Player records ===
- Most times top points scorer: 3

(Wales) Matthew McLean for Worthing Raiders (2011–12, 2017–18, 2018–19)
(England) Gary Kingdom for Taunton Titans (2014–15, 2015–16, 2019–20)

- Most times top try scorer: 2

(England) Phil Chesters for Ealing Trailfinders (2009–10, 2010–11)
(England) Ian Clark for Hartpury College (2011–12, 2012–13)

- Most points in a season: 374

(Fiji) Nat Saumi for Penzance & Newlyn (2000–01)

- Most tries in a season: 70

(England) Phil Chesters for Ealing Trailfinders (2010–11))

- Most points in a match: 45

(England) Adam Westall for Lydney away to Haywards Heath on 12 March 2005 (2004–05)

- Most tries in a match: 7

(Malta) James O'Brien for Old Patesians at home to Old Colfeians on 27 March 2004 (2003–04)
(England) Phil Chesters for Ealing Trailfinders at home to Newbury Blues on 2 October 2010 and at home to Lydney on 30 April 2011 (2010–11)

- Most conversions in a match: 16

(England) Richard Gregg for Old Albanian at home to Newbury Blues on 26 March 2011 (2010–11)

- Most penalties in a match: 7

(Ireland) Jonathan Griffin for Blackheath at home to Redruth on 14 December 2002 (2002–03)
(England) Kieron Davies for Hertford at home to Rosslyn Park on 30 September 2006 (2006–07)
(England) John Barnes for Clifton at home to Lydney on 21 October 2006 (2006–07)
(England) Mitch Burton for Dings Crusaders at home to Southend on 6 November 2011 (2010–-11)
(England) Luke Cozens for Hartpury College away to Dings Crusaders on 17 November 2012 (2012–13)
(England) Danial Trigg for Dings Crusaders away to Lydney on 1 December 2012 (2012–13)
(Cornwall) Kieron Lewitt for Launceston away to Dings Crusaders on 27 September 2014 (2014–15)

- Most drop kicks in a match: 3

(England) Lee Audis for Westcombe Park at home to Ealing Trailfinders on 5 December 2009 (2009–10)

=== Attendance records ===
(Note: Note that due to poor attendance keeping by press and online sources means that the 2002–03 and 2003–04 seasons are excluded from these statistics due to lack of information.)

- Highest attendance (league game): 3,270

Henley Hawks at home to Worthing Raiders on 4 May 2013 (2012–13)

- Lowest attendance (league game): 0

Tonbridge Juddians at home to Sutton & Epsom on 21 December 2019 (2019–20)

- Highest attendance (promotion playoff): 4,000

Redruth at home to Macclesfield on 1 May 2005 (2004–05)

- Lowest attendance (promotion playoff): 473

Old Albanian at home to Sedgley Park on 14 May 2016 (2015–16)

- Highest average attendance (club): 1,281

Plymouth Albion (2000–01)

- Lowest average attendance (club): 96

Old Patesians (2006–07)

- Highest average attendance (season): 573 (2000–01)
- Lowest average attendance (season): 292 (2009–10)

=== All time National League 2 South top 10 point scorers ===
As of the end of the games of 27 April 2019. Stats taken from 1998–99 season onwards and include regular league games only in National League 2 South (no promotion play-off games). Points scored includes tries, drop kicks, penalties and conversions.

Rank	Nat	Name	Years	Club(s)	Points	Apps	Ratio
1	(Wales)	**Matthew McLean**	2008–13, 2014–	Worthing Raiders	2,314	237	9.8
2	(England)	**Gary Kingdom**	2010–	Taunton Titans	1,979	245	8.1
3	(England)	Adam Westall	2002–03, 2004–08; 2008–10	Lydney; Dings Crusaders	1,368	130	11
4	(England)	Andy Frost	2005–07, 2009–13; 2014–15	Southend Saxons; Dorking	1,302	117	11
5	(England)	Derek Coates	2000–03; 2003-04	Westcombe Park; Blackheath	1,183	99	12
6	(Cornwall)	Kieron Lewitt	2007–09; 2011–15	Canterbury; Launceston	1,134	131	9
7	(England)	James Comben	2009–13, 2014–15	Henley Hawks	924	103	9
8	(England)	**Tom Best**	2009–11; 2012–	Canterbury	858	202	4.2
9	(England)	**Bradley Barnes**	2012–14, 2015- 2014–15	Clifton; Lydney	830	168	4.9
10	(England)	Tom White	2014–17	Old Elthamians	778	85	9.2

(Bold denotes players still playing in National League 2 South)

=== All time National League 2 South top 10 try scorers ===
As of the end of the games of 27 April 2019. Stats taken from 1998–99 season onwards and include regular league games only in National League 2 South (no promotion play-off games).

Rank	Nat	Name	Years	Club(s)	Tries	Apps	Ratio
1	(England)	Phil Chesters	2009–11; 2017; 2017–	Ealing Trailfinders; Old Elthamians; Chinnor	117	75	1.6
2	(Wales)	**Matthew McLean**	2008–13, 2014–	Worthing Raiders	115	237	0.5
3	(England)	Andy Thorpe	2001–08	North Walsham	114	143	0.8
4	(England)	Michael Melford	2006–11, 2012–13	Canterbury	92	148	0.6
5	(England)	Mark Billings	2005–07, 2009–16	Southend	89	213	0.4
6	(England)	Alexander Nielsen	2008–13, 2014–17	Worthing Raiders	83	139	0.6
7	(England)	Owen Bruynseels	2007–11	Ealing Trailfinders	81	95	0.9
8	(England)	Nick Hankin	2013–17	Bishop's Stortford	80	119	0.7
8	(South Africa)	Gert De Kock	2003–05; 2006–11	Westcombe Park; Canterbury	80	166	0.5
8	(England)	**William Pomphrey**	2009–	Clifton	80	175	0.5

(Bold denotes players still playing in National League 2 South)

== See also ==
- English rugby union system
- History of the English rugby union system
- National League 2 North
- National League 2 East
- National League 2 West
