= 2010–11 National League 2 South =

Rugby union competition in England

- Countries: England
- Champions: Ealing
- Runners-up: Jersey (also promoted)
- Relegated: Newbury Blues, Hinckley, Canterbury
- Attendance: 71,374 (average 331 per match) (Note: Note that 27 home attendances are missing (see below) – so the total attendance will not be 100% accurate. The average attendance has also been taken into account with the missing games not included.)
- Highest attendance: 2,000; Jersey v Richmond; 12 February 2011
- Lowest attendance: 50; Hinckley v Ealing Trailfinders; 6 November 2010
- Top point scorer: (England) Phil Chesters (Ealing Trailfinders); 350 points
- Top try scorer: (England) Phil Chesters (Ealing Trailfinders); 70 tries

The 2010–11 National League 2 South was the second season (24th overall) of the fourth tier of the English domestic rugby union competitions since the professionalised format of the second division was introduced. The league system was 4 points for a win, 2 points for a draw and additional bonus points being awarded for scoring 4 or more tries and/or losing within 7 points of the victorious team. In terms of promotion the league champions would go straight up into National League 1 while the runners up would have a one-game playoff against the runners up from National League 2 North (at the home ground of the club with the superior league record) for the final promotion place.

Ealing Trailfinders finished the season as champions pipping newly promoted Jersey to the title by just four points in a season where both sides dominated the league. Jersey did join Ealing in the 2011–12 National League 1 by beating the 2010–11 National League 2 North runners up Loughborough Students in a playoff game watched by 3,000 fans in Saint Peter, Jersey. At the opposite end of the table, Newbury Blues had a terrible season, suffering a third consecutive relegation dropping to National League 3 South West, having won just one game and conceded over 2,000 points (a divisional all-time worst which also included a record 132–0 defeat by Old Albanian). Joining Newbury in relegation would be Hinckley who dropped to National League 3 Midlands, while the third and final place went to the wire with relegation rivals Canterbury and Westcombe Park meeting in a rescheduled game on the 7 May 2011 – a week after the season had finished. Westcombe Park won 25–18 at Canterbury to condemn the Kent side to National League 3 London & SE. The season was also notable for the incredible try scoring feats of Ealing Trailfinders winger Phil Chesters who scored an amazing 70 tries in 27 games – an English league record, as well as the dedicated support for Jersey who had regular attendances of over a thousand – outstanding for tier 4. Chesters also became the first top try scorer in the league to also become the top points scorer as well.

== Participating teams ==
Eleven of the teams listed below participated in the 2009–10 National League 2 South season; Newbury Blues were relegated from National League 1, Jersey (champions) and Old Albanian (playoffs) were promoted from National League 3 London & SE while Taunton were promoted from National League 3 South West. In order to address an imbalance between divisions – Hinckley were transferred from National League 2 North having achieved a late promotion from National League 3 Midlands as a consequence of Ampthill being stripped of that divisions title due to a breach of RFU rules.

Locations of the 2010–11 National League 2 South teams
Greater London National League 2 South clubs

Team	Stadium	Capacity	City/Area
Canterbury	Merton Lane	1,500 (75 seats)	Canterbury, Kent
Clifton	Station Road	2,200 (200 seats)	Cribbs Causeway, Patchway, Bristol
Dings Crusaders	Landseer Avenue	1,500	Lockleaze, Bristol
Ealing Trailfinders	Trailfinders Sports Ground	3,020	Ealing, London
Henley Hawks	Dry Leas	4,000	Henley-on-Thames, Oxfordshire
Hinckley	Leicester Road	2,000	Hinckley, Leicestershire
Jersey	St. Peter	5,000	Saint Peter, Jersey
Lydney	Regentsholme	3,000 (340 seats)	Lydney, Gloucestershire
Newbury Blues	Monk's Lane	8,000	Newbury, Berkshire
Old Albanian	Woollam Playing Fields	1,000	St Albans, Hertfordshire
Richmond	Athletic Ground	4,500 (1,000 seats)	Richmond, London
Shelford	The Davey Field	2,000 (150 seats)	Great Shelford, Cambridgeshire
Southend	Warners Park	1,500 (150 seats)	Southend, Essex
Taunton	Hyde Park	2,000 (198 seats)	Taunton, Somerset
Westcombe Park	Goddington Dene	3,200	Orpington, London
Worthing Raiders	Roundstone Lane	1,500 (100 seats)	Angmering, West Sussex

== League table ==
2010–11 National League 2 South table
Pos	Team	Pld	W	D	L	PF	PA	PD	B	Pts	Qualification
1	Ealing Trailfinders (C)	30	27	1	2	1490	424	+1066	22	132	Promoted
2	Jersey (P)	30	27	0	3	1071	482	+589	20	128	Promotion play-off
3	Richmond	30	24	0	6	1125	526	+599	21	117	
4	Southend	30	20	1	9	959	658	+301	22	104	
5	Old Albanian	30	18	1	11	1080	668	+412	27	101	
6	Henley Hawks	30	18	1	11	888	668	+220	19	93	
7	Taunton	30	18	0	12	881	847	+34	16	88	
8	Worthing Raiders	30	17	0	13	897	685	+212	19	87	
9	Clifton	30	14	0	16	712	757	−45	12	68	
10	Dings Crusaders	30	12	1	17	718	765	−47	12	62	
11	Lydney	30	12	0	18	669	955	−286	13	61	
12	Shelford	30	9	0	21	754	852	−98	20	56	
13	Westcombe Park	30	9	0	21	612	889	−277	15	51	
14	Canterbury (R)	30	7	1	22	724	940	−216	20	50	Relegated
15	Hinckley (R)	30	4	0	26	494	1282	−788	8	24	Relegated
16	Newbury Blues (R)	30	1	0	29	379	2055	−1676	4	8	Relegated

Updated to match(es) played on 28 April 2012. Source: www.englandrugby.com, westcombeparkrugby.co.uk
Rules for classification: If teams are level at any stage, tiebreakers are applied in the following order:
1. Number of matches won
2. Difference between points for and against
3. Total number of points for
4. Aggregate number of points scored in matches between tied teams
5. Number of matches won excluding the first match, then the second and so on until the tie is settled
  (C) Champion; (P) Promoted; (R) Relegated

== Results ==
=== Round 1 ===
4 September 2010

(BP) Canterbury	42–32	Clifton (BP)
	Report

Merton Lane
Referee: Richard Kelly

4 September 2010

(BP) Dings Crusaders	83–0	Newbury Blues
	Report

Landseer Avenue
Attendance: 180
Referee: Mike Cooper

4 September 2010

(BP) Henley Hawks	36–16	Taunton
	Report

Dry Leas
Attendance: 320

4 September 2010

(2BP) Hinckley	30–35	Old Albanian (BP)
	Report

Leicester Road

4 September 2010

Lydney	16–34	Ealing Trailfinders (BP)
	Report

Regentsholme
Attendance: 500
Referee: Tom Davis

4 September 2010

(BP) Shelford	17–18	Jersey
	Report

The Davey Field
Attendance: 304
Referee: Mark Liddell

4 September 2010

(BP) Southend	35–22	Richmond
	Report

Warners Bridge Park
Referee: Nick Cockburn

4 September 2010

Worthing Raiders	32–10	Westcombe Park
	Report

Roundstone Lane
Attendance: 280
Referee: Shane Lewis

=== Round 2 ===
11 September 2010

Clifton	15–14	Dings Crusaders (BP)
	Report

Station Road
Attendance: 356
Referee: Simon McConnell

11 September 2010

Ealing Trailfinders	15–13	Richmond (BP)
	Report

Trailfinders Sports Ground
Attendance: 350
Referee: Richard Phillips

11 September 2010

Hinckley	10–53	Southend
	Report

Leicester Road
Attendance: 200
Referee: Will Halford

11 September 2010

Jersey	21–10	Worthing Raiders
	Report

St Peter
Attendance: 850
Referee: D Edmunds

11 September 2010

Newbury Blues	18–43	Henley Hawks (BP)
	Report

Monk's Lane
Attendance: 467
Referee: Nick Williams

11 September 2010

(BP) Old Albanian	39––23	Shelford
	Report

Woollam Playing Fields
Attendance: 280
Referee: Guy Steel Bodger

11 September 2010

(BP) Taunton	30–19	Lydney
	Report

Hyde Park
Attendance: 380
Referee: Paul Kimber

11 September 2010

Westcombe Park	12–29	Canterbury (BP)
	Report

Goddington Dene
Attendance: 344
Referee: Cemmy Rudkin

=== Round 3 ===
18 September 2010
14:00

Canterbury	13–35	Jersey
	Report

Merton Lane
Attendance: 237
Referee: Rowan Kitt

18 September 2010
15:00

(BP) Dings Crusaders	41–18	Westcombe Park
	Report

Landseer Avenue
Attendance: 196
Referee: Tom Davis

18 September 2010
15:00

(BP) Henley Hawks	42–14	Clifton
	Report

Dry Leas
Attendance: 327
Referee: Paul Knowles

18 September 2010
15:00

(BP) Lydney	52–8	Newbury Blues
	Report

Regentsholme
Attendance: 400
Referee: Mark Liddell

18 September 2010
15:00

(BP) Richmond	25–26	Taunton
	Report

Richmond Athletic Ground
Attendance: 921
Referee: Matt Carley

18 September 2010
15:00

(BP) Shelford	34–7	Hinckley
	Report

The Davey Field
Attendance: 204
Referee: Paul Kimber

18 September 2010
15:00

(BP) Southend	32–32	Ealing Trailfinders
	Report

Warners Bridge Park
Attendance: 300
Referee: Shane Lewis

18 September 2010
15:00

(BP) Worthing Raiders	32–25	Old Albanian (BP)
	Report

Roundstone Lane
Attendance: 285
Referee: Nick Williams

=== Round 4 ===
25 September 2010
15:00

Clifton	24–32	Lydney (BP)
	Report

Station Road
Attendance: 303
Referee: Nick Williams

25 September 2010
15:00

(BP) Hinckley	32–47	Worthing Raiders (BP)
	Report

Leicester Road
Attendance: 120
Referee: Mike Cooper

25 September 2010
15:00

(BP) Jersey	35–15	Dings Crusaders
	Report

St Peter
Attendance: 1,250
Referee: Shane Lewis

25 September 2010
15:00

Newbury Blues	7–81	Richmond (BP)
	Report

Monk's Lane
Attendance: 352
Referee: Karl Kirkpatrick

25 September 2010
15:00

(BP) Old Albanian	43–23	Canterbury
	Report

Woollam Playing Fields
Attendance: 60
Referee: Wayne Falla

25 September 2010
15:00

(BP) Shelford	32–44	Southend
	Report

The Davey Field
Attendance: 847
Referee: Darren Gamage

25 September 2010
15:00

Taunton	17–33	Ealing Trailfinders
	Report

Hyde Park
Attendance: 400
Referee: Charles Sampson

25 September 2010
15:00

(2BP) Westcombe Park	27–32	Henley Hawks (BP)
	Report

Goddington Dene
Attendance: 180
Referee: Nick Cockburn

=== Round 5 ===
2 October 2010
15:00

(BP) Canterbury	29–12	Hinckley
	Report

Merton Lane
Attendance: 153
Referee: Richard Phillips

2 October 2010
15:00

Dings Crusaders	20–24	Old Albanian
	Report

Landseer Avenue
Attendance: 105
Referee: Philip Davis

2 October 2010
15:00

(BP) Ealing Trailfinders	94–0	Newbury Blues
	Report

Trailfinders Sports Ground
Attendance: 223
Referee: Tom Foley

2 October 2010
15:00

Henley Hawks	22–33	Jersey (BP)
	Report

Dry Leas
Attendance: 510
Referee: Matt Carley

2 October 2010
15:00

(BP) Lydney	20–21	Westcombe Park
	Report

Regentsholme
Attendance: 325
Referee: Guy Steel Bodger

2 October 2010
15:00

(BP) Richmond	27–10	Clifton
	Report

Richmond Athletic Ground
Attendance: 543
Referee: Andrew Vertigan

2 October 2010
15:00

(BP) Southend	23–25	Taunton
	Report

Warners Bridge Park
Attendance: 240
Referee: Mike Cooper

2 October 2010
15:00

Worthing Raiders	21–13	Shelford
	Report

Roundstone Lane
Attendance: 265
Referee: Mark Liddell

=== Round 6 ===
9 October 2010

Clifton	12–28	Ealing Trailfinders
	Report

Station Road
Attendance: 235
Referee: Shane Lewis

9 October 2010

(BP) Hinckley	15–22	Dings Crusaders (BP)

Leicester Road
Attendance: 175
Referee: Brendan Fitzmaurice

9 October 2010

Jersey	32–25	Lydney
	Report

St Peter
Referee: Tom Davis

9 October 2010

(BP) Newbury Blues	22–74	Taunton (BP)
	Report

Monk's Lane
Attendance: 334
Referee: Paul Kimber

9 October 2010

(BP) Old Albanian	50–23	Henley Hawks
	Report

Woollam Playing Fields
Referee: Karl Kirkpatrick

9 October 2010

Shelford	26–7	Canterbury
	Report

The Davey Field
Attendance: 298
Referee: Mark Jackson

9 October 2010

Westcombe Park	6–34	Richmond
	Report

Goddington Dene
Attendance: 231
Referee: Charles Samson

9 October 2010

Worthing Raiders	28–36	Southend (BP)
	Report

Roundstone Lane
Attendance: 315
Referee: Richard Phillips

=== Round 7 ===
16 October 2010
14:30

(BP) Canterbury	20–38	Worthing Raiders (BP)
	Report

Merton Lane
Attendance: 186
Referee: Fergus Kirby

16 October 2010
15:00

(BP) Dings Crusaders	41–13	Shelford
	Report

Landseer Avenue
Attendance: 187
Referee: Tom Foley

16 October 2010
15:00

(BP) Ealing Trailfinders	47–10	Westcombe Park
	Report

Trailfinders Sports Ground
Attendance: 175
Referee: Marius Mitrea

16 October 2010
15:00

(BP) Henley Hawks	56–22	Lydney (BP)
	Report

Dry Leas
Attendance: 325
Referee: Will Halford

16 October 2010
15:00

Lydney	27–22	Old Albanian (BP)
	Report

Regentsholme
Attendance: 325
Referee: Shane Lewis

16 October 2010
15:00

Richmond	25–14	Jersey
	Report

Richmond Athletic Ground

16 October 2010
15:00

(BP) Southend	100–0	Newbury Blues
	Report

Warners Bridge Park
Attendance: 200
Referee: Mark Liddell

16 October 2010
15:00

(BP) Taunton	61–25	Clifton
	Report

Hyde Park
Referee: Nick Williams

=== Round 8 ===
23 October 2010
14:30

Canterbury	10–34	Southend (BP)
	Report

Merton Lane
Attendance: 183
Referee: Nick Williams

23 October 2010
14:30

(BP) Clifton	57–22	Newbury Blues (BP)
	Report

Station Road
Attendance: 160
Referee: Guy Steel Bodger

23 October 2010
15:00

Hinckley	0–27	Lydney
	Report

Leicester Road
Attendance: 75
Referee: Mike Cooper

23 October 2010
15:00

(BP) Jersey	32–18	Ealing Trailfinders
	Report

St Peter
Attendance: 1,350
Referee: Andrew Vertigan

23 October 2010
15:00

Old Albanian	26–39	Richmond
	Report

Woollam Playing Fields
Referee: Simon McConnell

23 October 2010
15:00

(BP) Shelford	7–13	Henley Hawks
	Report

The Davey Field
Attendance: 316
Referee: Paul Kimber

23 October 2010
15:00

Westcombe Park	3–45	Taunton (BP)
	Report

Goddington Dene
Attendance: 182
Referee: Mark Liddell

23 October 2010
15:15

Worthing Raiders	27–20	Dings Crusaders (BP)
	Report

Roundstone Lane
Attendance: 315
Referee: Richard Phillips

=== Round 9 ===
30 October 2010
15:00

Dings Crusaders	30–30	Canterbury (BP)
	Report

Landseer Avenue
Attendance: 125
Referee: Mike Cooper

30 October 2010
15:00

(BP) Ealing Trailfinders	37–10	Old Albanian
	Report

Trailfinders Sports Ground
Referee: Revis Phillips

30 October 2010
15:00

(BP) Henley Hawks	34–32	Worthing Raiders (2BP)
	Report

Dry Leas
Attendance: 410
Referee: Simon McConnell

30 October 2010
15:00

Lydney	31–26	Shelford (BP)
	Report

Regentsholme
Attendance: 325
Referee: Mark Jackson

30 October 2010
15:00

Newbury Blues	22–33	Westcombe Park (BP)
	Report

Monk's Lane
Attendance: 325
Referee: Paul Kimber

30 October 2010
15:00

(BP) Richmond	49–11	Hinckley
	Report

Richmond Athletic Ground
Attendance: 402
Referee: Richard Phillips

30 October 2010
15:00

(2BP) Southend	26–33	Clifton
	Report

Warners Bridge Park
Attendance: 250
Referee: David Proctor

30 October 2010
15:00

(BP) Taunton	32–26	Jersey (2BP)
	Report

Hyde Park
Attendance: 1,200
Referee: Nick Williams

=== Round 10 ===
6 November 2010
13:45

(BP) Jersey	122–10	Newbury Blues
	Report

St Peter
Referee: Mark Liddell

6 November 2010
14:00

(BP) Canterbury	30–25	Henley Hawks (2BP)
	Report

Merton Lane
Attendance: 102
Referee: Mike Cooper

6 November 2010
14:00

(2BP) Westcombe Park	31–38	Clifton (BP)
	Report

Goddington Dene
Attendance: 220
Referee: Richard Phillips

6 November 2010
14:00

(BP) Worthing Raiders	34–26	Lydney
	Report

Roundstone Lane
Attendance: 359
Referee: Tom Foley

6 November 2010
14:15

Hinckley	10–89	Ealing Trailfinders (BP)
	Report

Leicester Road
Attendance: 50
Referee: Michael Dickens

6 November 2010
14:30

Dings Crusaders	28–25	Southend (BP)
	Report

Landseer Avenue
Attendance: 135
Referee: Nick Williams

6 November 2010
14:30

Shelford	19–34	Richmond (BP)
	Report

The Davey Field
Attendance: 249
Referee: Shane Lewis

6 November 2010
15:00

(BP) Old Albanian	51–18	Taunton
	Report

Woollam Playing Fields
Referee: Simon Harding

=== Round 11 ===
13 November 2010
13:00

Newbury Blues	7–44	Old Albanian (BP)
	Report

Monk's Lane
Attendance: 180
Referee: Phil Watters

13 November 2010
14:00

Lydney	12–11	Canterbury (BP)
	Report

Regentsholme
Attendance: 325
Referee: Paul Kimber

13 November 2010
14:00

(BP) Richmond	31–8	Worthing Raiders
	Report

Richmond Athletic Ground
Attendance: 305

13 November 2010
15:00

Clifton	17–33	Jersey (BP)
	Report

Station Road
Attendance: 196
Referee: Karl Kirkpatrick

13 November 2010
15:00

(BP) Ealing Trailfinders	87–7	Shelford
	Report

Trailfinders Sports Ground
Attendance: 139
Referee: Mark Liddell

13 November 2010
15:00

(BP) Henley Hawks	13–18	Dings Crusaders
	Report

Dry Leas
Attendance: 252
Referee: D Edmunds

13 November 2010
15:00

(BP) Southend	38–5	Westcombe Park
	Report

Warners Bridge Park
Attendance: 120
Referee: Nick Cockburn

13 November 2010
15:00

(BP) Taunton	39–10	Hinckley
	Report

Hyde Park
Referee: Nick Williams

=== Round 12 ===
20 November 2010
14:00

(BP) Canterbury	28–52	Richmond (BP)
	Report

Merton Lane
Attendance: 138
Referee: Richard Phillips

20 November 2010
14:00

(BP) Jersey	30–6	Westcombe Park
	Report

St Peter
Attendance: 750
Referee: Guy Steel Bodger

20 November 2010
14:00

Worthing Raiders	20–32	Ealing Trailfinders (BP)
	Report

Roundstone Lane
Attendance: 330
Referee: Simon McConnell

20 November 2010
14:15

(BP) Hinckley	36–12	Newbury Blues
	Report

Leicester Road
Attendance: 150
Referee: Luke Haskins

20 November 2010
14:30

Dings Crusaders	21–20	Lydney (BP)
	Report

Landseer Avenue
Referee: Simon Harding

20 November 2010
14:30

(2BP) Shelford	25–31	Taunton (BP)
	Report

The Davey Field
Referee: Karl Kirkpatrick

20 November 2010
15:00

(BP) Henley Hawks	36–11	Southend
	Report

Dry Leas
Attendance: 226
Referee: Nick Williams

20 November 2010
15:00

(BP) Old Albanian	31–16	Clifton
	Report

Woollam Playing Fields
Referee: Paul Kimber

=== Round 13 ===
27 November 2010
13:00

Newbury Blues	22–54	Shelford (BP)
	Report

Monk's Lane
Attendance: 125
Referee: Will Halford

27 November 2010
14:00

Southend	33–25	Jersey (BP)
	Report

Warners Bridge Park
Attendance: 200
Referee: Tom Davis

27 November 2010
15:00

Ealing Trailfinders	72–34	Canterbury
	Report

Trailfinders Sports Ground
Attendance: 294
Referee: Shane Lewis

27 November 2010
16:30

(BP) Richmond	39–24	Dings Crusaders
	Report

Richmond Athletic Ground
Attendance: 195
Referee: Mike Cooper

27 November 2010

Clifton	P–P	Hinckley

Postponed. Game rescheduled to 5 February 2010.

27 November 2010

Lydney	P–P	Henley Hawks

Postponed. Game rescheduled to 5 February 2010.

27 November 2010

Taunton	P–P	Worthing Raiders

Postponed. Game rescheduled to 5 February 2010.

27 November 2010

Westcombe Park	P–P	Old Albanian

- Postponed. Game rescheduled to 5 February 2010.

=== Round 14 ===
4 December 2010

Canterbury	P–P	Taunton

- Postponed. Game rescheduled to 26 February 2011.

4 December 2010

Dings Crusaders	P–P	Ealing Trailfinders

- Postponed. Game rescheduled to 26 February 2011.

4 December 2010

Henley Hawks	P–P	Richmond

- Postponed. Game rescheduled to 26 February 2011.

4 December 2010

Hinckley	P–P	Westcombe Park

- Postponed. Game rescheduled to 26 February 2011.

4 December 2010

Lydney	P–P	Southend

- Postponed. Game rescheduled to 26 February 2011.

4 December 2010

Old Albanian	P–P	Jersey

- Postponed. Game rescheduled to 26 February 2011.

4 December 2010

Shelford	P–P	Clifton

- Postponed. Game rescheduled to 26 February 2011.

4 December 2010

Worthing Raiders	P–P	Newbury Blues

- Postponed. Game rescheduled to 26 February 2011.

=== Round 15 ===
11 December 2010
14:00

(BP) Jersey	45–20	Hinckley
	Report

St Peter
Attendance: 600
Referee: Richard Phillips

11 December 2010
14:30

Clifton	10–9	Worthing Raiders (BP)
	Report

Station Road
Attendance: 267
Referee: D Edmunds

11 December 2010
15:00

(BP) Ealing Trailfinders	41–16	Henley Hawks
	Report

Trailfinders Sports Ground
Referee: Paul Kimber

11 December 2010
15:00

(BP) Richmond	56–9	Lydney
	Report

Richmond Athletic Ground
Attendance: 380
Referee: Simon McConnell

11 December 2010
15:00

Southend	31–26	Old Albanian (2BP)
	Report

Warners Bridge Park
Attendance: 250
Referee: Mark Liddell

11 December 2010
15:00

Taunton	34–23	Dings Crusaders
	Report

Hyde Park
Referee: Shane Lewis

11 December 2010

Newbury Blues	P–P	Canterbury

- Postponed. Game rescheduled to 5 February 2011.

11 December 2010

Shelford	P–P	Westcombe Park

- Postponed. Game rescheduled to 23 March 2011.

=== Round 16 ===
18 December 2010

Canterbury	P–P	Westcombe Park

- Postponed. Game rescheduled to 7 May 2011.

18 December 2010

Dings Crusaders	P–P	Clifton

- Postponed. Game rescheduled to 23 March 2011.

18 December 2010

Henley Hawks	P–P	Newbury Blues

- Postponed. Game rescheduled to 23 March 2011.

18 December 2010

Lydney	P–P	Taunton

- Postponed. Game rescheduled to 23 March 2011.

18 December 2010

Richmond	P–P	Ealing Trailfinders

- Postponed. Game rescheduled to 5 February 2011.

18 December 2010

Shelford	P–P	Old Albanian

- Postponed. Game rescheduled to 26 April 2011.

18 December 2010

Southend	P–P	Hinckley

- Postponed. Game rescheduled to 23 March 2011.

18 December 2010

Worthing Raiders	P–P	Jersey

- Postponed. Game rescheduled to 23 March 2011.

=== Round 17 ===
8 January 2011
14:00

(BP) Westcombe Park	18–25	Dings Crusaders
	Report

Goddington Dene
Attendance: 156
Referee: Paul Kimber

8 January 2011
14:15

Hinckley	25–19	Shelford (BP)
	Report

Leicester Road
Attendance: 75
Referee: Nick Cockburn

8 January 2011
14:15

(BP) Jersey	31–15	Canterbury
	Report

St Peter
Attendance: 800
Referee: Mike Cooper

8 January 2011
14:30

(BP) Clifton	32–6	Henley Hawks
	Report

Station Road
Attendance: 150
Referee: Shane Lewis

8 January 2011
14:30

Newbury Blues	25–49	Lydney (BP)
	Report

Monk's Lane

8 January 2011
15:00

(BP) Ealing Trailfinders	27–0	Southend
	Report

Trailfinders Sports Ground
Attendance: 491
Referee: Andrew Jackson

8 January 2011
15:00

(BP) Old Albanian	36–27	Worthing Raiders (BP)
	Report

Woollam Playing Fields
Attendance: 200
Referee: Mark Liddell

8 January 2011
15:00

(BP) Taunton	16–20	Richmond
	Report

Hyde Park

=== Round 18 ===
15 January 2011
14:00

Canterbury	8–45	Old Albanian (BP)
	Report

Merton Lane
Attendance: 186
Referee: Richard Phillips

15 January 2011
14:00

Lydney	23–22	Clifton (BP)
	Report

Regentsholme
Attendance: 325

15 January 2011
14:30

(BP) Dings Crusaders	20–25	Jersey
	Report

Landseer Avenue
Attendance: 135
Referee: Steve Penfold

15 January 2011
15:00

(BP) Henley Hawks	22–10	Westcombe Park
	Report

Dry Leas
Attendance: 265
Referee: Nick Williams

15 January 2011
15:00

(BP) Richmond	108–0	Newbury Blues
	Report

Richmond Athletic Ground
Attendance: 623
Referee: Mark Liddell

15 January 2011
15:00

Southend	21–12	Shelford
	Report

Warners Bridge Park
Attendance: 120
Referee: Rowan Kitt

15 January 2011
15:00

(BP) Ealing Trailfinders	50–7	Taunton
	Report

Trailfinders Sports Ground
Attendance: 396
Referee: Darren Gamage

15 January 2011
15:00

(BP) Worthing Raiders	48–14	Hinckley
	Report

Roundstone Lane
Attendance: 300
Referee: Paul Kimber

=== Round 19 ===
22 January 2011
13:45

Jersey	18–15	Henley Hawks (BP)
	Report

St Peter
Attendance: 750
Referee: Marcus Caton

22 January 2011
14:00

(2BP) Westcombe Park	25–32	Lydney (BP)
	Report

Goddington Dene
Attendance: 272
Referee: Richard Phillips

22 January 2011
14:15

Hinckley	23–17	Canterbury (BP)
	Report

Leicester Road
Attendance: 75
Referee: Tom Foley

22 January 2011
14:30

(BP) Clifton	14–18	Richmond
	Report

Station Road
Attendance: 326
Referee: S Bradford

22 January 2011
14:30

Newbury Blues	10–90	Ealing Trailfinders (BP)
	Report

Monk's Lane
Attendance: 250
Referee: Paul Kimber

22 January 2011
15:00

(BP) Old Albanian	31–12	Dings Crusaders
	Report

Woollam Playing Fields
Attendance: 300
Referee: Rob Warburton

22 January 2011
15:00

Shelford	17–25	Worthing Raiders
	Report

The Davey Field
Attendance: 273
Referee: Mike Cooper

22 January 2011
15:00

Taunton	17–15	Southend (BP)
	Report

Hyde Park
Attendance: 409
Referee: Mark Jackson

=== Round 20 ===
29 January 2011
14:00

Canterbury	22–33	Shelford
	Report

Merton Lane
Attendance: 113
Referee: Tom Davis

29 January 2011
14:15

Lydney	7–24	Jersey (BP)
	Report

Regentsholme
Attendance: 518
Referee: Shane Lewis

29 January 2011
14:30

(BP) Dings Crusaders	65–20	Hinckley
	Report

Landseer Avenue
Attendance: 136
Referee: D Edmunds

29 January 2011
14:30

(BP) Taunton	55–23	Newbury Blues
	Report

Hyde Park
Referee: Nick Williams

29 January 2011
15:00

(BP) Ealing Trailfinders	44–10	Clifton
	Report

Trailfinders Sports Ground
Referee: Mike Cooper

29 January 2011
15:00

(BP) Henley Hawks	24–24	Old Albanian
	Report

Dry Leas
Attendance: 285
Referee: Luke Haskins

29 January 2011
15:00

(BP) Richmond	33–3	Westcombe Park
	Report

Richmond Athletic Ground
Attendance: 853
Referee: Giuseppe Vivarini

29 January 2011
15:00

(BP) Southend	29–27	Worthing Raiders (BP)
	Report

Warners Bridge Park
Attendance: 180
Referee: Nick Cockburn

=== Rounds 13, 15 & 16 (Rescheduled games) ===
5 February 2011
14:00

(2BP) Westcombe Park	26–31	Old Albanian (BP)
	Report

Goddington Dene
Attendance: 112
Referee: Paul Kimber

- Rescheduled from 27 November 2010.

5 February 2011
14:15

(BP) Lydney	24–27	Henley Hawks
	Report

Regentsholme
Attendance: 561
Referee: Wayne Falla

- Rescheduled from 27 November 2010.

5 February 2011
14:30

(BP) Clifton	34–10	Hinckley
	Report

Station Road
Attendance: 77
Referee: Nick Williams

- Rescheduled from 27 November 2010.

5 February 2011
15:00

(BP) Newbury Blues	24–19	Canterbury (BP)
	Report

Monk's Lane
Attendance: 92
Referee: Richard Phillips

- Rescheduled from 11 December 2010.

5 February 2011
15:00

Richmond	6–15	Ealing Trailfinders
	Report

Richmond Athletic Ground
Attendance: 1,053
Referee: Ross Campbell

- Rescheduled from 18 December 2010.

5 February 2011
15:00

Taunton	17–26	Worthing Raiders (BP)
	Report

Hyde Park
Attendance: 300
Referee: David Proctor

- Rescheduled from 27 November 2010.

=== Round 21 ===
12 February 2011
14:00

Westcombe Park	10–39	Ealing Trailfinders (BP)
	Report

Goddington Dene
Attendance: 131
Referee: Mike Cooper

12 February 2011
14:00

(BP) Worthing Raiders	57–22	Canterbury (BP)
	Report

Roundstone Lane
Attendance: 325
Referee: Richard Phillips

12 February 2011
14:15

Hinckley	10–31	Henley Hawks (BP)
	Report

Leicester Road
Attendance: 75
Referee: Mark Liddell

12 February 2011
14:30

Clifton	15–8	Taunton (BP)
	Report

Station Road
Attendance: 270
Referee: Michael Dickens

12 February 2011
14:30

Jersey	29–9	Richmond
	Report

St Peter
Attendance: 2,000
Referee: Keith Lewis

12 February 2011
14:30

Shelford	19–5	Dings Crusaders
	Report

The Davey Field
Attendance: 314
Referee: Phillip Davis

12 February 2011
15:00

Newbury Blues	13–57	Southend (BP)
	Report

Monk's Lane
Attendance: 195
Referee: Guy Steel Bodger

12 February 2011
15:00

(BP) Old Albanian	43–13	Lydney
	Report

Woollam Playing Fields
Attendance: 150
Referee: Simon McConnell

=== Round 22 ===
19 February 2011
14:00

Ealing Trailfinders	0–15	Jersey
	Report

Trailfinders Sports Ground
Attendance: 450
Referee: Chris Sharp

19 February 2011
14:30

Dings Crusaders	16–8	Worthing Raiders
	Report

Landseer Avenue
Attendance: 175
Referee: Claudio Blessano

19 February 2011
14:30

Newbury Blues	19–58	Clifton (BP)
	Report

Monk's Lane
Attendance: 215
Referee: Mike Cooper

19 February 2011
14:45

(BP) Lydney	36–10	Hinckley
	Report

Regentsholme
Attendance: 486
Referee: S Calantonio

19 February 2011
15:00

Henley Hawks	27–12	Shelford
	Report

Dry Leas
Attendance: 320
Referee: Guy Steel Bodger

19 February 2011
15:00

(BP) Richmond	39–29	Old Albanian
	Report

Richmond Athletic Ground
Attendance: 328
Referee: Richard Phillips

19 February 2011
15:00

Southend	21–12	Canterbury
	Report

Warners Bridge Park
Attendance: 120
Referee: Karl Kirkpatrick

19 February 2011
15:00

(BP) Taunton	29–17	Westcombe Park
	Report

Hyde Park

=== Round 14 (Rescheduled games) ===
26 February 2011
14:00

(BP) Shelford	13–19	Clifton
	Report

The Davey Field
Attendance: 269
Referee: Andrew Vertigan

- Rescheduled from 4 December 2010.

26 February 2011
14:30

(BP) Dings Crusaders	3–8	Ealing Trailfinders
	Report

Landseer Avenue
Attendance: 461
Referee: Phil Watters

- Rescheduled from 4 December 2010.

26 February 2011
14:30

Hinckley	17–13	Westcombe Park (BP)
	Report

Leicester Road
Attendance: 100
Referee: Simon McConnell

- Rescheduled from 4 December 2010.

26 February 2011
15:00

(BP) Canterbury	17–18	Taunton
	Report

Merton Lane
Attendance: 127
Referee: Mike Cooper

- Rescheduled from 4 December 2010.

26 February 2011
15:00

(BP) Lydney	8–12	Southend
	Report

Regentsholme
Attendance: 456
Referee: Nick Williams

- Rescheduled from 4 December 2010.

26 February 2011
15:00

(BP) Henley Hawks	15–21	Richmond
	Report

Dry Leas
Attendance: 255
Referee: Tom Davis

- Rescheduled from 4 December 2010.

26 February 2011
15:00

(BP) Old Albanian	19–20	Jersey
	Report

Woollam Playing Fields
Attendance: 135
Referee: Will Halford

- Rescheduled from 4 December 2010.

26 February 2011
15:00

(BP) Worthing Raiders	51–5	Newbury Blues
	Report

Roundstone Lane
Attendance: 320
Referee: Guy Steel Bodger

- Rescheduled from 4 December 2010.

=== Round 23 ===
5 March 2011
14:00

(BP) Westcombe Park	71–15	Newbury Blues
	Report

Goddington Dene
Attendance: 369
Referee: Richard Phillips

5 March 2011
14:30

(BP) Canterbury	18–20	Dings Crusaders
	Report

Merton Lane
Attendance: 187
Referee: Rowan Kitt

5 March 2011
14:30

Clifton	18–26	Southend
	Report

Station Road
Attendance: 120
Referee: Paul Kimber

5 March 2011
14:30

(BP) Shelford	61–18	Lydney
	Report

The Davey Field
Attendance: 254
Referee: Will Halford

5 March 2011
15:00

Hinckley	15–66	Richmond (BP)
	Report

Leicester Road
Attendance: 75
Referee: Guy Steel Bodger

5 March 2011
15:00

(BP) Jersey	46–18	Taunton
	Report

St Peter
Attendance: 1,150
Referee: Wayne Falla

5 March 2011
15:00

Old Albanian	19–28	Ealing Trailfinders
	Report

Woollam Playing Fields
Attendance: 240
Referee: Simon Harding

5 March 2011
15:00

(BP) Worthing Raiders	30–8	Henley Hawks
	Report

Roundstone Lane
Attendance: 550
Referee: Shane Lewis

=== Round 24 ===
12 March 2011
14:30

(BP) Clifton	30–20	Westcombe Park
	Report

Station Road
Attendance: 130
Referee: Phil Watters

12 March 2011
14:30

Newbury Blues	0–99	Jersey (BP)
	Report

Monk's Lane
Attendance: 105
Referee: Paul Kimber

12 March 2011
14:45

(BP) Lydney	18–23	Worthing Raiders
	Report

Regentsholme
Attendance: 496
Referee: Marcus Caton

12 March 2011
15:00

(BP) Ealing Trailfinders	130–14	Hinckley
	Report

Trailfinders Sports Ground
Attendance: 328
Referee: Richard Phillips

12 March 2011
15:00

(BP) Henley Hawks	31–27	Canterbury (BP)
	Report

Dry Leas
Attendance: 325
Referee: Simon McConnell

12 March 2011
15:00

(BP) Richmond	61–28	Shelford (BP)
	Report

Richmond Athletic Ground
Attendance: 727
Referee: John Healy

12 March 2011
15:00

(BP) Southend	39–13	Dings Crusaders
	Report

Warners Bridge Park
Attendance: 160
Referee: Richard Kelly

12 March 2011
15:00

(BP) Taunton	34–31	Old Albanian (2BP)
	Report

Hyde Park
Referee: Shane Lewis

=== Rounds 15 & 16 (Rescheduled games) ===
19 March 2011
15:00

(BP) Dings Crusaders	26–27	Clifton
	Report

Landseer Avenue
Attendance: 250
Referee: Ross Campbell

- Rescheduled from 18 December 2010.

19 March 2011
15:00

(BP) Henley Hawks	87–5	Newbury Blues
	Report

Dry Leas
Attendance: 260
Referee: Paul Kimber

- Rescheduled from 18 December 2010.

19 March 2011
15:00

(BP) Lydney	30–28	Taunton (BP)
	Report

Regentsholme
Attendance: 491
Referee: Nick Cockburn

- Rescheduled from 18 December 2010.

19 March 2011
15:00

(BP) Southend	48–17	Hinckley
	Report

Warners Bridge Park
Attendance: 60
Referee: Revis Phillips

- Rescheduled from 18 December 2010.

19 March 2011
14:00

Westcombe Park	22–17	Shelford (BP)
	Report

Goddington Dene
Referee: Mike Cooper

- Rescheduled from 11 December 2010.

19 March 2011
15:00

Worthing Raiders	10–37	Jersey (BP)
	Report

Roundstone Lane
Attendance: 425
Referee: Keith Lewis

- Rescheduled from 18 December 2010.

=== Round 25 ===
26 March 2011
14:30

(BP) Canterbury	55–5	Lydney
	Report

Merton Lane
Attendance: 206

26 March 2011
14:30

Dings Crusaders	17–28	Henley Hawks
	Report

Landseer Avenue
Attendance: 264
Referee: Richard Phillips

26 March 2011
14:30

(BP) Old Albanian	132–0	Newbury Blues
	Report

Woollam Playing Fields
Attendance: 200
Referee: Tom Davis

26 March 2011
14:30

(BP) Shelford	22–59	Ealing Trailfinders (BP)
	Report

The Davey Field
Attendance: 228
Referee: Will Halford

26 March 2011
15:00

Hinckley	22–30	Taunton
	Report

Leicester Road
Attendance: 70
Referee: Mark Liddell

26 March 2011
15:00

(BP) Jersey	44–28	Clifton
	Report

St Peter
Attendance: 1,022
Referee: Simon McConnell

26 March 2011
15:00

(BP) Westcombe Park	36–25	Southend
	Report

Goddington Dene
Attendance: 185
Referee: Guy Steel Bodger

26 March 2011
15:00

Worthing Raiders	22–36	Richmond (BP)
	Report

Roundstone Lane
Attendance: 400
Referee: Paul Kimber

=== Round 26 ===
2 April 2011
14:00

(2BP) Westcombe Park	31–33	Jersey (BP)
	Report

Goddington Dene
Attendance: 451
Referee: Richard Phillips

2 April 2011
14:30

Clifton	10–25	Old Albanian
	Report

Station Road
Attendance: 80
Referee: Rob Warburton

26 March 2011
15:00

(BP) Ealing Trailfinders	45–10	Worthing Raiders
	Report

Trailfinders Sports Ground
Referee: Simon McDowell

2 April 2011
15:00

Lydney	27–13	Dings Crusaders
	Report

Regentsholme
Attendance: 320
Referee: Karl Kirkpatrick

2 April 2011
15:00

Newbury Blues	22–37	Hinckley (BP)
	Report

Monk's Lane
Attendance: 145
Referee: Guy Steel Bodger

2 April 2011
15:00

(BP) Richmond	61–19	Canterbury
	Report

Richmond Athletic Ground
Attendance: 549
Referee: John Healy

2 April 2011
15:00

(BP) Southend	36–21	Henley Hawks
	Report

Warners Bridge Park
Attendance: 160
Referee: Paul Kimber

2 April 2011
15:00

(BP) Taunton	40–36	Shelford (2BP)
	Report

Hyde Park
Referee: Nick Williams

=== Round 27 ===
9 April 2011
15:00

Canterbury	12–69	Ealing Trailfinders (BP)
	Report

Merton Lane
Attendance: 125
Referee: Mike Cooper

9 April 2011
15:00

Dings Crusaders	10–38	Richmond (BP)
	Report

Landseer Avenue
Attendance: 150
Referee: Filippo Bertelli

9 April 2011
15:00

(BP) Henley Hawks	62–7	Lydney
	Report

Dry Leas
Attendance: 375
Referee: Nick Williams

9 April 2011
15:00

Hinckley	12–22	Clifton
	Report

Leicester Road
Attendance: 75
Referee: Luke Haskins

9 April 2011
15:00

(BP) Jersey	33–6	Southend
	Report

St Peter
Referee: Richard Kelly

9 April 2011
15:00

(BP) Old Albanian	54–19	Westcombe Park
	Report

Woollam Playing Fields
Attendance: 100
Referee: Andrew Vertigan

9 April 2011
15:00

(BP) Shelford	78–19	Newbury Blues
	Report

The Davey Field
Attendance: 645
Referee: S Bradford

9 April 2011
15:00

(BP) Worthing Raiders	62–7	Taunton
	Report

Roundstone Lane
Attendance: 325
Referee: Richard Phillips

=== Round 28 ===
16 April 2011
14:30

(BP) Clifton	15–16	Shelford
	Report

Station Road
Attendance: 100
Referee: Tom Foley

16 April 2011
15:00

(BP) Ealing Trailfinders	65–12	Dings Crusaders
	Report

Trailfinders Sports Ground
Attendance: 327
Referee: Paul Kimber

16 April 2011
15:00

Jersey	31–21	Old Albanian
	Report

St Peter
Attendance: 1,295
Referee: Simon Harding

16 April 2011
15:00

Newbury Blues	19–74	Worthing Raiders (BP)
	Report

Monk's Lane
Attendance: 139
Referee: Mark Liddell

16 April 2011
15:00

(BP) Richmond	14–20	Henley Hawks
	Report

Richmond Athletic Ground
Attendance: 583
Referee: Shane Lewis

16 April 2011
15:00

(BP) Southend	42–20	Lydney
	Report

Warners Bridge Park
Attendance: 280
Referee: John Healy

16 April 2011
15:00

Taunton	26–43	Canterbury (BP)
	Report

Hyde Park
Attendance: 295
Referee: Rob Warburton

16 April 2011
15:00

(BP) Westcombe Park	36–15	Hinckley
	Report

Goddington Dene
Attendance: 278
Referee: Brendan Fitzmaurice

=== Round 29 ===
23 April 2011
15:00

(BP) Canterbury	81–5	Newbury Blues
	Report

Merton Lane
Attendance: 240
Referee: S Bradford

23 April 2011
15:00

Dings Crusaders	25–56	Taunton (BP)
	Report

Landseer Avenue
Attendance: 151
Referee: John Healy

23 April 2011
15:00

Henley Hawks	25–35	Ealing Trailfinders (BP)
	Report

Dry Leas
Attendance: 545
Referee: Richard Kelly

23 April 2011
15:00

Hinckley	0–60	Jersey (BP)
	Report

Leicester Road
Attendance: 75
Referee: Paul Kimber

23 April 2011
15:00

(BP) Lydney	17–22	Richmond (BP)
	Report

Regentsholme
Attendance: 571
Referee: Richard Phillips

23 April 2011
15:00

(BP) Old Albanian	21–25	Southend (BP)
	Report

Woollam Playing Fields
Attendance: 206
Referee: Simon McConnell

23 April 2011
15:00

(BP) Shelford	33–25	Westcombe Park
	Report

The Davey Field
Attendance: 364
Referee: Keith Lewis

23 April 2011
15:00

(BP) Worthing Raiders	37–30	Clifton (2BP)
	Report

Roundstone Lane
Attendance: 420
Referee: Guy Steel Bodger

=== Round 16 (Rescheduled game) ===
26 April 2011
15:00

(BP) Shelford	23–29	Old Albanian (BP)
	Report

The Davey Field
Attendance: 264
Referee: Philip Davis

- Rescheduled from 18 December 2010.

=== Round 30 ===
30 April 2011
14:30

Clifton	25–12	Canterbury
	Report

Station Road
Attendance: 250
Referee: Paul Kimber

30 April 2011
15:00

(BP) Ealing Trailfinders	127–19	Lydney
	Report

Trailfinders Sports Ground
Attendance: 1,108
Referee: Paul Knowles

30 April 2011
15:00

Jersey	25–20	Shelford (BP)
	Report

St Peter
Attendance: 1,420
Referee: Nick Cockburn

30 April 2011
15:00

(BP) Newbury Blues	25–36	Dings Crusaders (BP)
	Report

Monk's Lane
Attendance: 340
Referee: Tom Foley

30 April 2011
15:00

(BP) Old Albanian	64–0	Hinckley
	Report

Woollam Playing Fields
Attendance: 200
Referee: Luke Haskins

30 April 2011
15:00

(BP) Richmond	51–36	Southend (BP)
	Report

Richmond Athletic Ground
Attendance: 420
Referee: Nick Williams

30 April 2011
15:00

(BP) Taunton	27–48	Henley Hawks (BP)
	Report

Hyde Park
Attendance: 451
Referee: Simon McConnell

30 April 2011
15:00

Westcombe Park	19–17	Worthing Raiders (BP)
	Report

Goddington Dene
Attendance: 305
Referee: Mark Liddell

=== Round 16 (Rescheduled game) ===
7 May 2011
15:00

(BP) Canterbury	18–25	Westcombe Park
	Report

Merton Lane
Attendance: 500
Referee: Darren Gamage

- Rescheduled from 18 December 2010.

=== Promotion play-off ===
Each season, the runners-up in the National League 2 South and National League 2 North participate in a play-off for promotion into National League 1. Jersey were runners-up in the South and would host the game as they had a better record in the league in comparison to the North runners up Loughborough Students.

28 May 2011
15:00

Jersey	30–5	Loughborough Students

St Peter
Attendance: 3,100

== Total season attendances ==
- Note that a large number of attendances are missing due to poor record keeping (see below for more detail). Also be aware that Jersey's playoff game does not count in the regular season attendances.

Club	Home Games	Total	Average	Highest	Lowest	% Capacity
Canterbury	14 (Note: Missing attendance: 4 September 2010 v Clifton.)	2,683	192	500	102	13%
Clifton	15	3,020	201	356	77	9%
Dings Crusaders	14 (Note: Missing attendance: 20 November 2010 v Lydney.)	2,650	189	461	105	13%
Ealing Trailfinders	11 (Note: Missing attendances: 30 October 2010 Old Albanian, 11 December 2010 v Henley, 29 January 2011 v Clifton, 26 March 2011 v Worthing.)	4,281	389	1,108	139	13%
Henley Hawks	15	5,000	333	545	226	8%
Hinckley	14 (Note: Missing attendance: 4 September 2010 v Old Albanian.)	1,390	99	200	50	5%
Jersey	12 (Note: Missing attendances: 9 October 2010 v Lydney, 6 November 2010 v Newbury, 9 April 2011 v Southend.)	13,237	1,103	2,000	600	22%
Lydney	15	6,424	428	571	320	14%
Newbury Blues	14 (Note: Missing attendance: 8 January 2011 v Lydney.)	3,264	233	467	92	3%
Old Albanian	11 (Note: Missing attendances: 9 October 2010 v Henley, 23 October 2010 v Richmond, 6 November 2010 v Taunton, 20 November 2010 v Clifton.)	2,009	183	300	60	18%
Richmond	14 (Note: Missing attendance: 16 October 2010 v Jersey.)	7,882	563	1,053	195	13%
Shelford	14 (Note: Missing attendance: 20 November 2010 v Taunton.)	4,829	345	847	204	17%
Southend	14 (Note: Missing attendance: 4 September 2010 v Richmond.)	2,640	189	300	60	13%
Taunton	7 (Note: Missing attendances: 16 October 2010 v Clifton, 13 November 2010 v Hinckley, 11 December 2010 v Dings, 8 January 2011 v Richmond, 29 January 2011 v Newbury, 19 February 2011 v Westcombe Park, 12 March 2011 v Old Albanian, 2 April 2011 v Shelford.)	3,435	491	1,200	295	25%
Westcombe Park	14 (Note: Missing attendance: 19 March 2011 v Shelford.)	3,416	244	451	112	8%
Worthing Raiders	15	5,214	348	550	265	23%

== Individual statistics ==
- Note that points scorers includes tries as well as conversions, penalties and drop goals. Does not include North–South playoff game.

=== Top points scorers ===
Rank	Player	Team	Appearances	Points
1	(England) Phil Chesters	Ealing Trailfinders	27	350
2	(Wales) Matthew McLean	Worthing Raiders	27	339
2	(England) Richard Gregg	Old Albanian	29	339
3	(England) Neil Hallett	Ealing Trailfinders	26	337
4	(England) Andy Frost	Southend	25	330
5	(Jersey) Michael Le Bourgeois	Jersey	30	307
6	(England) James Combden	Henley Hawks	29	243
7	(England) Ross Broadfoot	Richmond	20	239
8	(England) Brett Turner	Lydney	23	235
9	(England) Gary Kingdom	Taunton	27	223

=== Top try scorers ===
Rank	Player	Team	Appearances	Tries
1	(England) Phil Chesters	Ealing Trailfinders	27	70
2	(England) Owen Bruynseels	Ealing Trailfinders	30	32
3	(New Zealand) Peter Kelly	Canterbury	26	29
4	(England) James Greenwood	Richmond	28	28
5	(England) Chris May	Old Albanian	28	26
6	(England) Michael Melford	Canterbury	29	23
6	(England) Jason Luff	Taunton	25	23
7	(England) Terry Adams	Old Albanian	26	21
8	(England) Guy Thompson	Richmond	18	19
8	(England) Mike Stanley	Southend	26	19

== Season records ==
=== Team ===
Largest home win — 132 pts

132–0 Old Albanian at home to Newbury Blues on 26 March 2011

Largest away win — 80 pts

90–10 Ealing Trailfinders away to Newbury on 22 January 2011

Most points scored — 132 pts

132–0 Old Albanian at home to Newbury Blues on 26 March 2011

Most tries in a match — 20 (x3)

Jersey at home to Newbury Blues on 6 November 2011
Ealing Trailfinders at home to Hinckley on 12 March 2011
Old Albanian at home to Newbury Blues on 26 March 2011

Most conversions in a match — 16 (x2)

Old Albanian at home to Newbury Blues on 26 March 2011
Ealing Trailfinders at home to Lydney on 30 April 2011

Most penalties in a match — 7

Dings Crusaders at home to Southend on 6 November 2011

Most drop goals in a match — 1

N/A – multiple teams

=== Player ===
Most points in a match — 37

(England) Richard Gregg for Old Albanian at home to Newbury Blues on 26 March 2011

Most tries in a match — 7 (x2)

(England) Phil Chesters for Ealing Trailfinders at home to Newbury Blues on 2 October 2010
(England) Phil Chesters for Ealing Trailfinders at home to Lydney on 30 April 2011

Most conversions in a match — 16

(England) Richard Gregg for Old Albanian at home to Newbury Blues on 26 March 2011

Most penalties in a match — 7

(England) Mitch Burton for Dings Crusaders at home to Southend on 6 November 2011

Most drop goals in a match — 1

N/A – multiple players

=== Attendances ===
Highest — 2,000

Jersey at home to Richmond on 12 February 2011

Lowest — 50

Hinckley at home to Ealing Trailfinders on 6 November 2010

Highest Average Attendance — 1,103

Jersey

Lowest Average Attendance — 99

Hinckley

== See also ==
- English rugby union system
- Rugby union in England
