= Phil Chesters =

English rugby union player

- Born: Philip Chesters; 29 October 1987 (age 39) Devon, England
- Height: 1.89 m (6 ft 2 in)

Rugby union career
- Position: Winger
- Current team: Chinnor
Senior career
Years	Team	Apps	(Points)
2008-09	Westcombe Park	10	(9)
2009-17	Ealing Trailfinders	183	(1,135)
2017	Old Elthamians	1	(0)
2017-	Chinnor	21	(95)
- Correct as of 28 April 2018
International career
Years	Team	Apps	(Points)
2012	Devon	1	(5)
2012	Barbarians	1	(5)
2012	England Counties XV	3	(20)

Phil Chesters (born 29 October 1987) is an English rugby union player who is currently playing for Chinnor in National League 1 having signed for the club for the 2017–18 season. Prior to that he had made his name at Ealing Trailfinders where he had also been part of the medical staff. His best position is winger and over his career he has proved to be a tremendous try scorer who has set multiple records in lower division English rugby with Ealing, notably all-time records of 42 tries in a season in tier 3 (National League 1) and an amazing 70 tries in a season in tier 4 (National League 2 South) – a record that is unlikely to ever be beaten. As of the end of the 2017-18 he has also become the National League 2 South all-time try scorer with 117 tries.

Surprisingly, despite all the records he has set Phil has been relatively unheralded by the English mainstream press and he has not played at the highest level of English rugby in the Premiership. As well as appearing for Ealing, Phil has also represented his county side Devon as well as Barbarians and England Counties XV.

== Rugby Union career ==
=== Early career ===
Although he grew up in Devon, Phil started his senior rugby union league career at the south-east London based club, Westcombe Park, during the 2008-09 season. Deployed as a full-back in what was a very competitive division, he found his chances limited at a club that would ultimately be relegated at the end of the season. After just one year at Wescombe Park, Phil would be signed by another local club, Ealing Trailfinders, who were playing in National League 2 South – the same division Park had just been demoted to. At Ealing Phil was switched from full-back to the wing where he was better able to make use of his speed and timing at a strong, attack focused team. Becoming a first team regular he had an outstanding debut season, scoring 29 tries to become the divisions top try scorer and helping his side to 3rd place in the 2009–10 National League 2 South, narrowly missing out on the playoff spot despite being tied on points with runners up, Rosslyn Park (who had a better for and against record).

=== Breaking records ===
If his debut season was good, his second season at Trailfinders was record breaking. Having come close to promotion last time around, Ealing would be strong favorites for the title along with league newcomers Jersey. The national league record for tries in a season had been set by Chris Ashton who had scored 39 tries while helping Northampton Saints make an instant return to the Premiership by winning the 2007–08 National Division One league title, himself beating the record of 38 tries set by Richard Newton of Penzance & Newlyn (now known as Cornish Pirates) back in 2000. This record was blown out of the water by Phil who broke it by February when he scored his 40th try against Richmond, ultimately ending the season with an unbelievable 70 tries. As well as breaking the most tries scored in a season, Phil also equaled the divisional record of most tries per game set by James O'Brien back in 2004 – by scoring 7 tries in a game – twice. Unsurprisingly considering the number of tries scored by Phil and the team as a whole (over 1,400 points scored in total), Ealing finished as champions of the 2010–11 National League 2 South, run close by runners up Jersey, with both teams streets ahead of everyone else.

His third season at Ealing was another good one for Phil and the club. Although some doubted that in a stronger league he would be able to dominate defences as he did in National League 2 South, he continued his rich vein of form by finishing as the league's top try scorer and breaking the National League 1 try record with 40 tries – the third year in a row he had finished as his division's top try scorer. Ealing battled for the 2011–12 National League 1 title with Jersey, as the two promoted sides dominated the league, but in the end had to settle for second place (and missing out on the only promotion spot) as the Islanders had a tremendous season. His form for Ealing would lead to Phil being called up by Devon for the Bill Beaumont Cup in May, bagging 2 tries in a 20 – 33 group stage defeat against Somerset in his only appearance at the competition. Phil would also be honoured with a cap for the Barbarians later that month, scoring a try in a 40 – 17 win for the Ba-Bas against Loughborough Students. The final highlight of another great season was a call up by England Counties XV for their tour of East Africa. Phil scored 4 tries in 3 games played for the Counties which include a brace in the pre-tour game against an Irish XV in Preston, Lancashire as they won all their games.

=== Near death and rehabilitation ===
The 2012-13 season was going well for Phil and his club. Ealing were top of National League 1 and Phil was having another prolific try scoring season with 29 tries to his name before March had drawn to close when disaster struck. Having helped Ealing to a 62 – 7 victory away to Sedgley Park in which he scored six tries, Phil had returned to London and had a night out with friends, during which he was hit by a car and suffered severe injuries including a fractured skull, broken jaw and injured shoulder. He was rushed to intensive care for surgery and spent a week in hospital until he was released to spend the rest of the season at his parents home to recover from his injuries. Despite missing their key try scorer, Ealing managed to win the league title and promotion to the RFU Championship for the first time in the club's history. Phil also finished as the top try scorer in the division as his 29 tries were enough to claim this accolade – now the fourth year in a row in which he had been the top try scorer in his division.

=== Championship up and downs ===
During his rehabilitation Phil had been unsure if he would ever play rugby union again due to his injuries but after several months he was given the all-clear and returned to the Ealing Trailfinders squad for contact training in August 2013 in preparation for the 2013–14 RFU Championship season. He made the Trailfinders team for the first game of the season at Allianz Park (a neutral venue for what was billed as the "Big Rugby Weekend"), making history by being the first Ealing try scorer in the Championship, in what was otherwise a disappointing game for his side as they lost 13 – 44 to London Scottish. It was a huge step up in class for both Phil and his team as Championship defences were far meaner than they had been in either National League 1 or National League 2 South and they struggled throughout the season, falling out of the British and Irish Cup before Christmas and being involved in a relegation battle with old foes Jersey. Phil scored 12 tries over the season but in the end his team experienced the agony of a last day relegation losing at home to Rotherham Titans while the Islanders had a bonus point victory away to Bedford Blues – staying up by a single point as Ealing's two losing points were not enough to save them from an instant return to National League 1.

The 2014-15 season saw Phil and Ealing back in National League 1. During the course of the season Ealing proved to be far too strong for the majority of the teams in the division, winning 27 games out of 30 to take the league title and make an instant return to the Championship – nine points clear of second placed Rosslyn Park. In a division where defences were less tight and playing for a winning team, Phil rediscovered his lethal try scoring touch, finishing as the divisions top try scorer with 33 tries.

Although Phil was not as prolific as he had been in the previous campaign, he still played an important role in ensuring that this time Ealing remained in the Championship, contributing 9 tries in the league over the 2015-16 season and condemning Moseley to the drop instead. The 2016-17 season saw Ealing go from strength to strength as they achieved a 3rd-place finish in the league and qualification to the playoffs where they lost to Yorkshire Carnegie despite winning the second leg. On a personal note Phil was relegated to more of a squad player this season despite appearing in one of the playoff semi-finals. In March 2017 he signed with Old Elthamians who would go on to achieve promotion from the 2016–17 National League 2 South via the playoffs, although Phil did not feature in the playoff victory.

=== Back to National 2 South ===
After his short spell with Old Elthamians, Phil decided to sign terms with Chinnor, signing for the club in June 2017. He scored 19 league tries during the 2017–18 as his side would go on to finish as league runners up in National League 2 South, and ultimately gain promotion after winning the play-off against Sedgley Park, although he did not play in this game.

== Season-by-season playing stats ==
Season	Club	Competition	Appearances	Tries	Drop Goals	Conversions	Penalties	Total Points
2008-09	Westcombe Park	National Division 2	10	1	0	2	0	9
2009-10	Ealing Trailfinders	National League 2 South	26	28	0	0	0	140
2010-11	Ealing Trailfinders	National League 2 South	27	70	0	0	0	350
2011-12	Ealing Trailfinders	National League 1	29	42	0	0	0	210
2012-13	Ealing Trailfinders	National League 1	23	29	0	0	0	145
2013-14	Ealing Trailfinders	RFU Championship	21	12	0	0	0	60
2013-14	Ealing Trailfinders	British and Irish Cup	5	1	0	0	0	5
2014-15	Ealing Trailfinders	National League 1	29	33	0	0	0	165
2015-16	Ealing Trailfinders	RFU Championship	13	8	0	0	0	40
2015-16	Ealing Trailfinders	British and Irish Cup	2	1	0	0	0	5
2016-17	Ealing Trailfinders	RFU Championship	7	2	0	0	0	10
2016-17	Ealing Trailfinders	British and Irish Cup	2	1	0	0	0	5
2016-17	Old Elthamians	National League 2 South	1	0	0	0	0	0
2017-18	Chinnor	National League 2 South	21	19	0	0	0	95

== Honours ==
Ealing Trailfinders

- National League 2 South champions: 2010-11
- National League 2 South top try scorer (2 times): 2009-10 (28 tries), 2010-11 (70 tries)
- National League 1 champions (2 times): 2012-13, 2014-15
- National League 1 top try scorer (3 times): 2011-12 (42 tries), 2012-13 (29 tries), 2014-15 (33 tries)

Chinnor

- National League 2 (north v south) promotion play-off winners: 2017–18

County/Representative

- Selected for Devon in County Championship: 2012
- Represented England Counties XV on tour of East Africa: 2012
- Represented Barbarians: 2012

== Playing records ==
- National League 2 South All-time top try scorer: 117 tries
- National League 2 South most times top try scorer: (Note: Tied with Ian Clark who was also top try scorer two years in a row with Hartpury.) 2 times during 2009-10 and 2010-11 seasons
- National League 2 South most tries in a season: 70 tries during 2010–11 season
- National League 2 South most tries in a match: (Note: Tied with James O'Brien who also got 7 tries in one game playing for Old Patesians.) 7 (x2) during 2010–11 season
- National League 1 most tries in a season: 42 tries during 2011-12 season
