= 2009–10 National League 2 South =

Rugby union competition in England

- Countries: England
- Champions: Barking
- Runners-up: Rosslyn Park (also promoted)
- Relegated: Bridgwater & Albion, Barnes
- Attendance: 58,619 (average 292 per match) (Note: Note that 6 home attendances are missing (see below) - so the total attendance will not be 100% accurate. The average attendance has also been taken into account with the missing games not included.)
- Highest attendance: 1,473; Richmond v Rosslyn Park; 26 September 2009
- Lowest attendance: 30; Barnes v Shelford; 20 February 2010
- Top point scorer: (Scotland) Ross Laidlaw (Rosslyn Park); 318 points
- Top try scorer: (England) Phil Chesters (Ealing Trailfinders); 28 tries

The 2009–10 National League 2 South was the first season (23rd overall) of the fourth tier (south) of the English domestic rugby union competitions since the professionalised format of the second division was introduced. Previously known as National Division 3 South, it had been renamed due to widespread changes to the league system by the RFU with National One becoming the Championship, National 2 becoming National 1 and so on. The league system was 4 points for a win, 2 points for a draw and additional bonus points being awarded for scoring 4 or more tries and/or losing within 7 points of the victorious team. In terms of promotion the league champions would go straight up into National League 1 while the runners up would have a one-game playoff against the runners up from National League 2 North (at the home ground of the club with the superior league record) for the final promotion place. A further change to the league system would see the division increase from 14 to 15 teams (this was originally supposed to be 16 teams but one of the teams relegated from the 2008–09 National Division 2, Mounts Bay, folded at the beginning of the season).

Barking would finish as champions with only two league defeats all season, while runners up Rosslyn Park would join them in the 2010–11 National League 1 by defeating 2009–10 National League 2 North runners up Loughborough Students in the National 2 promotion playoff. At the bottom of the table Bridgwater & Albion and newly promoted Barnes would be condemned to National League 3 South West and National League 3 London & SE respectively.

== Participating teams ==
Eleven of the teams listed below participated in the 2008–09 National League 3 South season; Westcombe Park were relegated from the 2008–09 National Division 2, while Clifton were promoted as champions of South West Division 1 with Shelford (champions) and Barnes (playoffs) coming up from London Division 1.

Locations of the 2009–10 National League 2 South teams
Greater London National League 2 South clubs

Team	Stadium	Capacity	City/Area
Barking	Goresbrook	1,000	Barking, London
Barnes	Barn Elms		Barnes, London
Bridgwater & Albion	Bath Road	5,000	Bridgwater, Somerset
Canterbury	Merton Lane	1,500 (75 seats)	Canterbury, Kent
Clifton	Station Road	2,200 (200 seats)	Clifton, Bristol
Dings Crusaders	Landseer Avenue	1,500	Lockleaze, Bristol
Ealing Trailfinders	Trailfinders Sports Ground	3,020	Ealing, London
Henley Hawks	Dry Leas	4,000	Henley-on-Thames, Oxfordshire
Lydney	Regentsholme	3,000 (340 seats)	Lydney, Gloucestershire
Richmond	Athletic Ground	4,500	Richmond, London
Rosslyn Park	The Rock	2,000 (630 seats)	Roehampton, London
Shelford	The Davey Field	2,000 (150 seats)	Great Shelford, Cambridgeshire
Southend	Warners Park	1,500 (150 seats)	Southend, Essex
Westcombe Park	Goddington Dene	3,200	Orpington, London
Worthing Raiders	Roundstone Lane	1,500 (100 seats)	Angmering, West Sussex

== League table ==
2009–10 National League 2 South table
Pos	Team	Pld	W	D	L	PF	PA	PD	B	Pts	Qualification
1	Barking (C)	28	26	0	2	1060	335	+725	22	124 (Note: Barking deducted 2 points.)	Promoted
2	Rosslyn Park (P)	28	23	1	4	995	423	+572	19	113	Promotion play-off
3	Ealing Trailfinders	28	22	1	5	1014	504	+510	23	113	
4	Southend	28	19	1	8	802	566	+236	17	95	
5	Clifton	28	18	2	8	682	571	+111	15	91	
6	Worthing Raiders	28	16	1	11	653	561	+92	9	75	
7	Canterbury	28	13	1	14	625	780	−155	13	67	
8	Richmond	28	11	0	17	706	761	−55	18	62	
9	Henley Hawks	28	11	1	16	668	598	+70	12	56 (Note: Henley deducted 2 points.)	
10	Shelford	27	11	1	15	550	778	−228	7	53	
11	Dings Crusaders	28	9	2	17	549	697	−148	13	53	
12	Lydney	28	8	0	20	580	807	−227	18	40 (Note: Lydney deducted 10 points.)	
13	Westcombe Park	27	8	0	19	434	832	−398	7	39	
14	Barnes (R)	28	6	1	21	486	916	−430	7	31 (Note: Barnes deducted 2 points.)	Relegated
15	Bridgwater & Albion (R)	28	2	0	26	321	996	−675	4	8 (Note: Bridgwater deducted 4 points.)	Relegated

Updated to match(es) played on 28 April 2012. Source: westcombeparkrugby.co.uk, www.englandrugby.com
Rules for classification: If teams are level at any stage, tiebreakers are applied in the following order:
1. Number of matches won
2. Difference between points for and against
3. Total number of points for
4. Aggregate number of points scored in matches between tied teams
5. Number of matches won excluding the first match, then the second and so on until the tie is settled
  (C) Champion; (P) Promoted; (R) Relegated
  Notes:

== Results ==
=== Round 1 ===
5 September 2009

(BP) Barking	42 - 3	Shelford
	Report

Goresbrook
Attendance: 300
Referee: Andrew Bickle

5 September 2009

Bridgwater & Albion	13 - 23	Barnes
	Report

Bath Road
Attendance: 598
Referee: Simon McConnell

5 September 2009

Canterbury	22 - 16	Lydney (BP)
	Report

Merton Lane
Attendance: 150
Referee: Guy Steel Bodger

5 September 2009

(BP) Dings Crusaders	29 - 22	Richmond (BP)
	Report

Landseer Avenue
Attendance: 122
Referee: Mark Liddell

5 September 2009
15:00

Henley Hawks	19 - 30	Westcombe Park
	Report

Dry Leas
Attendance: 325
Referee: Ed Turnill

5 September 2009

Rosslyn Park	23 - 21	Clifton (BP)
	Report

The Rock
Attendance: 440
Referee: Tom Davis

5 September 2009
15:00

Worthing Raiders	25 - 20	Southend (BP)
	Report

Roundstone Lane
Attendance: 250
Referee: Keith Lewis

Bye: Ealing Trailfinders

=== Round 2 ===
12 September 2009

(BP) Barking	48 - 20	Canterbury
	Report

Goresbrook
Attendance: 250
Referee: Mark Liddell

12 September 2009

Barnes	6 - 25	Rosslyn Park
	Report

Barn Elms
Attendance: 200
Referee: Paul Kimber

12 September 2009

Richmond	17 - 32	Ealing Trailfinders (BP)
	Report

Richmond Athletic Ground
Attendance: 574
Referee: Simon McConnell

12 September 2009

(BP) Clifton	31 - 20	Henley Hawks
	Report

Station Road
Attendance: 110
Referee: Andrew Bickle

12 September 2009

Lydney	26 - 17	Dings Crusaders
	Report

Regentsholme
Attendance: 650

12 September 2009
15:00

Shelford	22 - 22	Southend
	Report

The Davey Field
Attendance: 200
Referee: Revis Phillips

12 September 2009
15:00

Westcombe Park	16 - 12	Worthing Raiders (BP)
	Report

Goddington Dene
Attendance: 229
Referee: Richard Parker-Sedgmore

Bye: Bridgwater & Albion

=== Round 3 ===
19 September 2009

Bridgwater & Albion	3 - 44	Richmond (BP)
	Report

Bath Road
Attendance: 380
Referee: Nick Ashton

19 September 2009

(BP) Canterbury	27 - 17	Shelford
	Report

Merton Lane
Attendance: 173
Referee: Tom Davis

19 September 2009

Dings Crusaders	9 - 18	Barking
	Report

Landseer Avenue
Attendance: 117
Referee: Marcus Caton

19 September 2009

(BP) Ealing Trailfinders	50 - 18	Lydney
	Report

Trailfinders Sports Ground
Attendance: 350
Referee: Ed Turnill

19 September 2009

(BP) Henley Hawks	26 - 14	Barnes
	Report

Dry Leas
Attendance: 315
Referee: Ian Tempest

19 September 2009
15:00

Southend	19 - 6	Westcombe Park
	Report

Warners Bridge Park
Attendance: 300
Referee: Nick Cockburn

19 September 2009

(BP) Worthing Raiders	20 - 27	Clifton (BP)
	Report

Roundstone Lane
Attendance: 260
Referee: Simon McConnell

Bye: Rosslyn Park

=== Round 4 ===
26 September 2009

(BP) Barking	44 - 29	Ealing Trailfinders (BP)
	Report

Goresbrook
Attendance: 250
Referee: Phillip Davis

26 September 2009

(BP) Barnes	14 - 19	Worthing Raiders
	Report

Barn Elms
Attendance: 150
Referee: Richard Parker-Sedgmore

26 September 2009

(BP) Canterbury	42 - 15	Dings Crusaders
	Report

Merton Lane
Attendance: 153
Referee: Paul Kimber

26 September 2009
15:00

(BP) Clifton	29 - 23	Southend (BP)
	Report

Station Road
Attendance: 160
Referee: Cemmy Rudkin

26 September 2009

(BP) Lydney	37 - 6	Bridgwater & Albion
	Report

Regentsholme
Attendance: 600

26 September 2009
15:00

Shelford	29 - 21	Westcombe Park
	Report

The Davey Field
Referee: Michael Tutty

26 September 2009

Richmond	13 - 28	Rosslyn Park (BP)
	Report

Richmond Athletic Ground
Attendance: 1,473
Referee: Simon McConnell

Bye: Henley Hawks

=== Round 5 ===
3 October 2009

Bridgwater & Albion	0 - 16	Barking
	Report

Bath Road
Attendance: 243
Referee: Paul Kimber

3 October 2009

(BP) Dings Crusaders	17 - 18	Shelford
	Report

Landseer Avenue
Attendance: 107

3 October 2009

(BP) Ealing Trailfinders	50 - 8	Canterbury
	Report

Trailfinders Sports Ground
Attendance: 374
Referee: Tom Davis

3 October 2009

Henley Hawks	25 - 36	Richmond (BP)
	Report

Dry Leas
Attendance: 375
Referee: Mark Liddell

3 October 2009

(BP) Rosslyn Park	29 - 5	Lydney
	Report

The Rock
Attendance: 410
Referee: Ed Turnill

3 October 2009
15:00

(BP) Southend	22 - 9	Barnes
	Report

Warners Bridge Park
Attendance: 300

3 October 2009
15:00

Westcombe Park	20 - 13	Clifton (BP)
	Report

Goddington Dene
Attendance: 195
Referee: Matt Carley

Bye: Worthing Raiders

=== Round 6 ===
10 October 2009
15:00

(BP) Barnes	19 - 20	Westcombe Park
	Report

Barn Elms
Attendance: 100
Referee: Paul Kimber

10 October 2009

(BP) Barking	43 - 19	Rosslyn Park
	Report

Goresbrook
Attendance: 350
Referee: Michael Tutty

10 October 2009

(BP) Canterbury	Report	Bridgwater & Albion
	31 - 18

Merton Lane
Attendance: 247
Referee: Ed Turnill

10 October 2009

(BP) Dings Crusaders	22 - 29	Ealing Trailfinders
	Report

Landseer Avenue
Attendance: 110
Referee: David Walker

10 October 2009

(BP) Lydney	30 - 20	Henley Hawks
	Report

Regentsholme
Attendance: 550

10 October 2009

Richmond	30 - 13	Worthing Raiders
	Report

Richmond Athletic Ground
Attendance: 852
Referee: Nick Cockburn

10 October 2009

(BP) Shelford	19 - 21	Clifton
	Report

The Davey Field
Attendance: 207
Referee: Simon Harding

Bye: Southend

=== Round 7 ===
17 October 2009

(BP) Bridgwater & Albion	32 - 23	Dings Crusaders
	Report

Bath Road
Attendance: 627
Referee: Simon McConnell

17 October 2009

Clifton	23 - 15	Barnes
	Report

Station Road
Attendance: 150
Referee: Greg MacDonald

17 October 2009

Ealing Trailfinders	36 - 15	Shelford
	Report

Trailfinders Sports Ground
Attendance: 574
Referee: Mark Liddell

17 October 2009

Henley Hawks	5 - 15	Barking
	Report

Dry Leas
Attendance: 240
Referee: Keith Lewis

17 October 2009

(BP) Rosslyn Park	70 - 19	Canterbury
	Report

The Rock
Attendance: 340
Referee: Paul Kimber

17 October 2009
15:00

(BP) Southend	41 - 27	Richmond (BP)
	Report

Warners Bridge Park
Attendance: 230
Referee: Ed Turnill

17 October 2009

Worthing Raiders	25 - 21	Lydney (BP)
	Report

Roundstone Lane
Attendance: 245
Referee: Mike Cooper

Bye: Westcombe Park

=== Round 8 ===
24 October 2009

(BP) Barking	34 - 22	Worthing Raiders
	Report

Goresbrook
Attendance: 365
Referee: Tom Davis

24 October 2009

Canterbury	19 - 30	Henley Hawks (BP)
	Report

Merton Lane
Attendance: 227
Referee: Stuart Parker

24 October 2009

Dings Crusaders	21 - 21	Rosslyn Park
	Report

Landseer Avenue
Attendance: 112
Referee: Simon Harding

24 October 2009

(BP) Ealing Trailfinders	52 - 7	Bridgwater & Albion
	Report

Trailfinders Sports Ground
Attendance: 342
Referee: Paul Kimber

24 October 2009
15:00

(BP) Lydney	20 - 24	Southend
	Report

Regentsholme
Attendance: 400

24 October 2009
15:00

(BP) Richmond	40 - 19	Westcombe Park
	Report

Richmond Athletic Ground
Attendance: 928
Referee: Terry Hall

24 October 2009

Shelford	30 - 12	Barnes
	Report

The Davey Field
Attendance: 222
Referee: Nick Cockburn

Bye: Clifton

=== Round 9 ===
31 October 2009

Bridgwater & Albion	21 - 37	Shelford (BP)
	Report

Bath Road
Attendance: 327
Referee: Richard Parker-Sedgmore

31 October 2009

(BP) Clifton	56 - 15	Richmond
	Report

Station Road
Attendance: 270
Referee: Andrea Pasquin

31 October 2009

Henley Hawks	28 - 0	Dings Crusaders
	Report

Dry Leas
Attendance: 256

31 October 2009

Rosslyn Park	31 - 24	Ealing Trailfinders (BP)
	Report

The Rock
Attendance: 510
Referee: Terry Hall

31 October 2009
15:00

Westcombe Park	21 - 7	Lydney
	Report

Goddington Dene
Attendance: 232
Referee: Shane Lewis

31 October 2009

Worthing Raiders	20 - 20	Canterbury
	Report

Roundstone Lane
Attendance: 285
Referee: Mark Varnon

31 October 2009
18:30

Southend	10 - 31	Barking (BP)
	Report

Warners Bridge Park
Attendance: 550
Referee: Nick Cockburn

Bye: Barnes

=== Round 10 ===
7 November 2009
14:15

(BP) Barking	32 - 0	Westcombe Park
	Report

Goresbrook
Attendance: 250
Referee: Andrew Bickle

7 November 2009

Bridgwater & Albion	10 - 30	Rosslyn Park (BP)
	Report

Bath Road
Attendance: 347
Referee: David Walker

7 November 2009
14:15

(BP) Canterbury	29 - 44	Southend (BP)
	Report

Merton Lane
Attendance: 178

7 November 2009

Dings Crusaders	26 - 10	Worthing Raiders
	Report

Landseer Avenue
Attendance: 105
Referee: Ed Turnill

7 November 2009

(BP) Ealing Trailfinders	36 - 25	Henley Hawks
	Report

Trailfinders Sports Ground
Attendance: 273
Referee: Richard Parker-Sedgmore

7 November 2009

(BP) Lydney	7 - 10	Clifton
	Report

Regentsholme
Attendance: 300
Referee: Simon Harding

7 November 2009

Richmond	21 - 32	Barnes (BP)
	Report

Richmond Athletic Ground
Attendance: 512
Referee: Clare Daniels

Bye: Shelford

=== Round 11 ===
14 November 2009

Barnes	17 - 43	Lydney (BP)
	Report

Barn Elms
Attendance: 50
Referee: Andrew Bickle

14 November 2009

Clifton	17 - 13	Barking (BP)
	Report

Station Road
Attendance: 231
Referee: Ross Campbell

14 November 2009

Henley Hawks	24 - 12	Bridgwater & Albion
	Report

Dry Leas
Attendance: 210
Referee: Ian Tempest

14 November 2009

Rosslyn Park	14 - 11	Shelford (BP)
	Report

The Rock
Attendance: 210
Referee: Greg MacDonald

14 November 2009
15:00

Southend	30 - 17	Dings Crusaders
	Report

Warners Bridge Park
Attendance: 250
Referee: Tom Davis

14 November 2009
14:15

Westcombe Park	13 - 22	Canterbury (BP)
	Report

Goddington Dene
Attendance: 66
Referee: Nick Ashton

14 November 2009

Worthing Raiders	5 - 18	Ealing Trailfinders
	Report

Roundstone Lane
Attendance: 215
Referee: Paul Kimber

Bye: Richmond

=== Round 12 ===
28 November 2009

(BP) Barking	65 - 0	Barnes
	Report

Goresbrook
Attendance: 363
Referee: Ian Tempest

28 November 2009

Bridgwater & Albion	10 - 20	Worthing Raiders
	Report

Bath Road
Attendance: 519
Referee: David Stephens

28 November 2009

(BP) Canterbury	51 - 17	Clifton
	Report

Merton Lane
Attendance: 163
Referee: Filippo Bertelli

28 November 2009
14:00

(BP) Ealing Trailfinders	39 - 28	Southend
	Report

Trailfinders Sports Ground
Referee: J Matthews

28 November 2009
14:15

Dings Crusaders	18 - 9	Westcombe Park
	Report

Landseer Avenue
Attendance: 101
Referee: Mark Jackson

28 November 2009

(BP) Rosslyn Park	48 - 3	Henley Hawks
	Report

The Rock
Attendance: 380
Referee: Cemmy Rudkin

28 November 2009

(BP) Shelford	49 - 17	Richmond
	Report

The Davey Field
Attendance: 245
Referee: Nick Ashton

Bye: Lydney

=== Round 13 ===
5 December 2009

Clifton	6 - 6	Dings Crusaders
	Report

Station Road
Attendance: 250
Referee: Philip Davis

5 December 2009

(BP) Henley Hawks	39 - 6	Shelford
	Report

Dry Leas
Attendance: 230
Referee: Rob Sheard

5 December 2009

(BP) Richmond	20 - 21	Lydney
	Report

Richmond Athletic Ground
Attendance: 358
Referee: Adam Friend

5 December 2009

Barnes	13 - 23	Canterbury
	Report

Barn Elms
Referee: Nick Cockburn

5 December 2009
15:00

(BP) Southend	61 - 0	Bridgwater & Albion
	Report

Warners Bridge Park
Attendance: 160
Referee: Mark Varnon

5 December 2009
14:15

(BP) Westcombe Park	24 - 28	Ealing Trailfinders (BP)
	Report

Goddington Dene
Attendance: 165
Referee: Simon McConnell

5 December 2009

Worthing Raiders	8 - 6	Rosslyn Park (BP)
	Report

Roundstone Lane
Attendance: 315
Referee: Mark Jackson

Bye: Barking

=== Round 14 ===
12 December 2009

Barking	24 - 19	Richmond (BP)
	Report

Goresbrook
Attendance: 500
Referee: Simon Harding

12 December 2009
14:15

Bridgwater & Albion	16 - 12	Westcombe Park (BP)
	Report

Bath Road
Attendance: 350
Referee: Wayne Falla

12 December 2009

(BP) Dings Crusaders	48 - 0	Barnes
	Report

Landseer Avenue
Attendance: 105

12 December 2009

(BP) Ealing Trailfinders	36 - 11	Clifton
	Report

Trailfinders Sports Ground
Attendance: 200
Referee: Steve Lee

12 December 2009

Henley Hawks	10 - 8	Worthing Raiders (BP)
	Report

Dry Leas
Attendance: 295
Referee: Guy Steel Bodger

12 December 2009
14:15

(BP) Rosslyn Park	38 - 15	Southend
	Report

The Rock
Attendance: 300
Referee: Tom Davis

12 December 2009

(BP) Shelford	44 - 6	Lydney
	Report

The Davey Field
Attendance: 226
Referee: Adrian Hartwell

Bye: Canterbury

=== Round 15 ===
19 December 2009

Barnes	P - P	Ealing Trailfinders

- Postponed. Game rescheduled to 6 February 2010.

19 December 2009

Clifton	P - P	Bridgwater & Albion

- Postponed. Game rescheduled to 6 February 2010.

19 December 2009

Lydney	P - P	Barking

- Postponed. Game rescheduled to 6 February 2010.

19 December 2009

Richmond	P - P	Canterbury

- Postponed. Game rescheduled to 6 February 2010.

19 December 2009

Southend	P - P	Henley Hawks

- Postponed. Game rescheduled to 6 February 2010.

19 December 2009

Westcombe Park	P - P	Rosslyn Park

- Postponed. Game rescheduled to 6 February 2010.

19 December 2009

Worthing Raiders	P - P	Shelford

- Postponed. Game rescheduled to 6 February 2010.

Bye: Dings Crusaders

=== Round 16 ===
2 January 2010

(BP) Canterbury	13 - 17	Barking
	Report

Merton Lane
Attendance: 196
Referee: Tom Davis

2 January 2010

(BP) Ealing Trailfinders	24 - 16	Richmond
	Report

Trailfinders Sports Ground
Referee: Nick Cockburn

2 January 2010

(BP) Rosslyn Park	51 - 9	Barnes
	Report

The Rock
Attendance: 370
Referee: Simon Harding

2 January 2010
15:00

(BP) Southend	32 - 20	Shelford
	Report

Warners Bridge Park
Attendance: 250
Referee: Mark Liddell

2 January 2010

Dings Crusaders	P - P	Lydney

- Postponed. Game rescheduled to 20 March 2010.

2 January 2010

Henley Hawks	P - P	Clifton

- Postponed. Game rescheduled to 20 March 2010.

2 January 2010

Worthing Raiders	P - P	Westcombe Park

- Postponed. Game rescheduled to 20 March 2010.

Bye: Bridgwater & Albion

=== Round 17 ===
9 January 2010

Barking	P - P	Dings Crusaders

- Postponed. Game rescheduled to 1 May 2010.

9 January 2010

Barnes	P - P	Henley Hawks

- Postponed. Game rescheduled to 1 May 2010.

9 January 2010

Clifton	P - P	Worthing Raiders

- Postponed. Game rescheduled to 1 May 2010.

9 January 2010

Lydney	P - P	Ealing Trailfinders

- Postponed. Game rescheduled to 1 May 2010.

9 January 2010

Richmond	P - P	Bridgwater & Albion

- Postponed. Game rescheduled to 20 March 2010.

9 January 2010

Shelford	P - P	Canterbury

- Postponed. Game rescheduled to 20 March 2010.

9 January 2010

Westcombe Park	P - P	Southend

- Postponed. Game rescheduled to 1 May 2010.

Bye: Rosslyn Park

=== Round 18 ===
16 January 2010

Bridgwater & Albion	10 - 21	Lydney
	Report

Bath Road
Attendance: 423
Referee: Paul Knowles

16 January 2010

Dings Crusaders	3 - 23	Canterbury
	Report

Landseer Avenue
Attendance: 135
Referee: Lee Towers

16 January 2010

(BP) Rosslyn Park	50 - 8	Richmond
	Report

The Rock
Attendance: 490
Referee: Marcus Caton

16 January 2010
15:00

(BP) Southend	6 - 7	Clifton
	Report

Warners Bridge Park
Attendance: 200
Referee: Paul Kimber

16 January 2010

Worthing Raiders	29 - 18	Barnes
	Report

Roundstone Lane
Attendance: 200
Referee: Greg MacDonald

16 January 2010

Ealing Trailfinders	P - P	Barking

- Postponed. Game rescheduled to 20 March 2010.

16 January 2010

Westcombe Park	P - P	Shelford

- Postponed. Game rescheduled to 19 March 2010.

Bye: Henley Hawks

=== Round 19 ===
23 January 2010

(BP) Barking	41 - 3	Bridgwater & Albion
	Report

Goresbrook
Attendance: 180
Referee: Nick Cockburn

23 January 2010
14:00

(BP) Barnes	24 - 29	Southend (BP)
	Report

Barn Elms
Attendance: 60
Referee: Philip Davis

23 January 2010

Canterbury	5 - 24	Ealing Trailfinders
	Report

Merton Lane
Attendance: 231
Referee: Paul Kimber

23 January 2010
14:15

Clifton	14 - 3	Westcombe Park
	Report

Station Road
Attendance: 200
Referee: Matthew Daubney

23 January 2010

(BP) Lydney	23 - 29	Rosslyn Park (BP)
	Report

Regentsholme
Attendance: 300
Referee: Simon McConnell

23 January 2010

(BP) Richmond	26 - 15	Henley Hawks
	Report

Richmond Athletic Ground
Attendance: 802
Referee: John Owen

23 January 2010

Shelford	21 - 17	Dings Crusaders (BP)
	Report

The Davey Field
Attendance: 137
Referee: Mark Liddell

Bye: Worthing Raiders

=== Round 20 ===
30 January 2010

(BP) Bridgwater & Albion	23 - 25	Canterbury
	Report

Bath Road
Attendance: 327
Referee: Mark Varnon

30 January 2010

(BP) Clifton	27 - 18	Shelford
	Report

Station Road
Attendance: 80
Referee: Steve Penfold

30 January 2010

(BP) Ealing Trailfinders	37 - 28	Dings Crusaders
	Report

Trailfinders Sports Ground
Attendance: 300
Referee: Simon Harding

30 January 2010

Rosslyn Park	11 - 10	Barking (BP)
	Report

The Rock
Attendance: 780
Referee: Darren Gamage

30 January 2010
14:15

(BP) Westcombe Park	19 - 20	Barnes
	Report

Goddington Dene
Attendance: 153
Referee: Giuseppe Vivarini

30 January 2010

(BP) Worthing Raiders	45 - 3	Richmond
	Report

Roundstone Lane
Attendance: 350
Referee: Andrew Bickle

30 January 2010

Henley Hawks	P - P	Lydney

- Postponed. Game rescheduled to 8 May 2010.

Bye: Southend

=== Round 15 (Rescheduled games) ===
6 February 2010

Barnes	8 - 73	Ealing Trailfinders (BP)
	Report

Barn Elms
Attendance: 200
Referee: Richard Parker-Sedgmore

- Rescheduled from 19 December 2009.

6 February 2010

(BP) Clifton	34 - 10	Bridgwater & Albion
	Report

Station Road
Attendance: 187
Referee: Karl Kirkpatrick

- Rescheduled from 19 December 2009.

6 February 2010

Lydney	16 - 35	Barking (BP)
	Report

Regentsholme
Attendance: 500
Referee: Trevor Fisher

- Rescheduled from 19 December 2009.

6 February 2010

Richmond	27 - 18	Canterbury
	Report

Richmond Athletic Ground
Attendance: 223
Referee: Mike Cooper

- Rescheduled from 19 December 2009.

6 February 2010
15:00

(BP) Southend	33 - 10	Henley Hawks
	Report

Warners Bridge Park
Attendance: 150
Referee: Guy Steel Bodger

- Rescheduled from 19 December 2009.

6 February 2010
14:00

Westcombe Park	3 - 75	Rosslyn Park (BP)
	Report

Goddington Dene
Attendance: 150
Referee: Simon Harding

- Rescheduled from 19 December 2009.

6 February 2010

(BP) Worthing Raiders	38 - 14	Shelford
	Report

Roundstone Lane
Attendance: 250
Referee: Mark Varnon

- Rescheduled from 19 December 2009.

=== Round 21 ===
13 February 2010

(BP) Barking	38 - 8	Henley Hawks
	Report

Goresbrook
Attendance: 200
Referee: Ed Turnill

13 February 2010

Barnes	25 - 25	Clifton (BP)
	Report

Barn Elms
Attendance: 50
Referee: Nick Cockburn

13 February 2010

(BP) Dings Crusaders	31 - 5	Bridgwater & Albion
	Report

Landseer Avenue
Attendance: 115
Referee: Cemmy Rudkin

13 February 2010
15:00

Richmond	20 - 30	Southend
	Report

Richmond Athletic Ground
Attendance: 189
Referee: Tom Davis

13 February 2010

Shelford	19 - 15	Ealing Trailfinders (BP)
	Report

The Davey Field
Attendance: 183
Referee: Simon McConnell

13 February 2010

(BP) Lydney	20 - 22	Worthing Raiders
	Report

Regentsholme
Attendance: 300

13 February 2010

Canterbury	P - P	Rosslyn Park

- Postponed. Game rescheduled for 1 May 2010.

Bye: Westcombe Park

=== Round 22 ===
20 February 2010
14:15

(BP) Westcombe Park	26 - 25	Richmond (2BP)
	Report

Goddington Dene
Attendance: 251
Referee: Guy Steel Bodger

20 February 2010

Barnes	10 - 18	Shelford
	Report

Barn Elms
Attendance: 30
Referee: Shane Lewis

20 February 2010

Bridgwater & Albion	15 - 54	Ealing Trailfinders (BP)
	Report

Bath Road
Attendance: 342
Referee: Claudio Blessano

20 February 2010

(BP) Henley Hawks	24 - 31	Canterbury (BP)
	Report

Dry Leas
Attendance: 320
Referee: Wayne Falla

20 February 2010

Rosslyn Park	24 - 17	Dings Crusaders (BP)
	Report

The Rock
Attendance: 420
Referee: Karl Kirkpatrick

20 February 2010
15:00

(BP) Southend	42 - 32	Lydney (BP)
	Report

Warners Bridge Park
Attendance: 230
Referee: Paul Kimber

20 February 2010

Worthing Raiders	6 - 29	Barking (BP)
	Report

Roundstone Lane
Attendance: 300
Referee: Richard Parker-Sedgmore

Bye: Clifton

=== Round 23 ===
27 February 2010
14:00

(BP) Barking	42 - 11	Southend
	Report

Goresbrook
Attendance: 375
Referee: Marcus Caton

27 February 2010

(BP) Canterbury	16 - 18	Worthing Raiders
	Report

Merton Lane
Attendance: 124

27 February 2010

Dings Crusaders	20 - 13	Henley Hawks (BP)
	Report

Landseer Avenue
Attendance: 101
Referee: Andrew Bickle

27 February 2010
14:15

Lydney	17 - 13	Westcombe Park (BP)
	Report

Regentsholme
Attendance: 350
Referee: Dino Maddern

27 February 2010

(BP) Ealing Trailfinders	8 - 9	Rosslyn Park
	Report

Trailfinders Sports Ground

27 February 2010

(BP) Shelford	27 - 15	Bridgwater & Albion
	Report

The Davey Field
Attendance: 217
Referee: Simon McConnell

27 February 2010

(2BP) Richmond	29 - 34	Clifton (BP)
	Report

Richmond Athletic Ground
Attendance: 114
Referee: Mark Varnon

Bye: Barnes

=== Round 24 ===
6 March 2010
14:00

Westcombe Park	14 - 59	Barking (BP)
	Report

Goddington Dene
Attendance: 235
Referee: Guy Steel Bodger

6 March 2010

Barnes	24 - 32	Richmond (BP)
	Report

Barn Elms
Attendance: 120
Referee: Paul Kimber

6 March 2010

Clifton	20 - 17	Lydney (BP)
	Report

Station Road
Attendance: 287
Referee: David Stephens

6 March 2010

Henley Hawks	19 - 19	Ealing Trailfinders
	Report

Dry Leas
Attendance: 351

6 March 2010

(BP) Rosslyn Park	62 - 24	Bridgwater & Albion (BP)
	Report

The Rock
Attendance: 490
Referee: Andrew Bickle

6 March 2010
15:00

(BP) Southend	37 - 5	Canterbury
	Report

Warners Bridge Park
Attendance: 200
Referee: Mark Liddell

6 March 2010

(BP) Worthing Raiders	35 - 7	Dings Crusaders
	Report

Roundstone Lane
Attendance: 300
Referee: Lee Towers

Bye: Shelford

=== Round 25 ===
13 March 2010

(BP) Barking	38 - 26	Clifton
	Report

Goresbrook
Attendance: 350
Referee: Ed Turnill

13 March 2010

Bridgwater & Albion	3 - 47	Henley Hawks (BP)
	Report

Bath Road
Attendance: 217
Referee: D Edmunds

13 March 2010
15:00

(BP) Canterbury	29 - 18	Westcombe Park
	Report

Merton Lane
Attendance: 130
Referee: Mark Varnon

13 March 2010
15:00

(BP) Dings Crusaders	16 - 19	Southend
	Report

Landseer Avenue
Attendance: 107
Referee: Mark Jackson

13 March 2010

(BP) Ealing Trailfinders	27 - 15	Worthing Raiders
	Report

Trailfinders Sports Ground
Attendance: 300
Referee: Simon McConnell

13 March 2010

(2BP) Lydney	31 - 33	Barnes (BP)
	Report

Regentsholme
Attendance: 400
Referee: Mike Cooper

13 March 2010

Shelford	3 - 42	Rosslyn Park (BP)
	Report

The Davey Field
Attendance: 235
Referee: Brendan Fitzmaurice

Bye: Richmond

=== Round 17 (Rescheduled game) ===
19 March 2010
15:00

Westcombe Park	C - C	Shelford

- Rescheduled from 16 January 2010 and eventually cancelled altogether due to fixture congestion meaning both Westcombe Park and Shelford would only play 29 games each.

=== Rounds 16, 17 & 18 (Rescheduled games) ===
20 March 2010

Dings Crusaders	29 - 27	Lydney (BP)
	Report

Landseer Avenue
Attendance: 152
Referee: Ed Turnill

- Game rescheduled from 2 January 2010.

20 March 2010

(BP) Ealing Trailfinders	19 - 21	Barking
	Report

Trailfinders Sports Ground
Attendance: 400
Referee: Terry Hall

- Game rescheduled from 16 January 2010.

20 March 2010

(BP) Henley Hawks	10 - 14	Clifton
	Report

Dry Leas
Attendance: 238
Referee: Nick Cockburn

- Game rescheduled from 2 January 2010.

20 March 2010

(BP) Richmond	37 - 19	Bridgwater & Albion
	Report

Richmond Athletic Ground
Attendance: 475
Referee: Simon Harding

- Game rescheduled from 9 January 2010.

20 March 2010

(BP) Shelford	29 - 24	Canterbury (2BP)
	Report

The Davey Field
Attendance: 301
Referee: Guy Steel Bodger

- Game rescheduled from 9 January 2010.

20 March 2010
15:00

Worthing Raiders	31 - 19	Westcombe Park
	Report

Roundstone Lane
Attendance: 320
Referee: Greg MacDonald

- Game rescheduled from 2 January 2010.

=== Round 26 ===
27 March 2010

Barnes	17 - 45	Barking (BP)
	Report

Barn Elms
Attendance: 100
Referee: Trevor Fisher

27 March 2010

(BP) Clifton	58 - 17	Canterbury
	Report

Station Road
Attendance: 120
Referee: Simon McConnell

27 March 2010

Henley Hawks	22 - 47	Rosslyn Park (BP)
	Report

Dry Leas
Attendance: 330
Referee: Paul Knowles

27 March 2010

(BP) Richmond	55 - 12	Shelford
	Report

Richmond Athletic Ground
Attendance: 412
Referee: Marius Mitrea

27 March 2010
15:00

(BP) Southend	27 - 28	Ealing Trailfinders
	Report

Warners Bridge Park
Attendance: 200
Referee: Paul Kimber

27 March 2010
15:00

(BP) Westcombe Park	45 - 43	Dings Crusaders (2BP)
	Report

Goddington Dene
Attendance: 180
Referee: Tom Davis

27 March 2010

(BP) Worthing Raiders	69 - 5	Bridgwater & Albion
	Report

Roundstone Lane
Attendance: 350
Referee: Mark Liddell

Bye: Lydney

=== Round 27 ===
3 April 2010
15:00

Bridgwater & Albion	0 - 15	Southend
	Report

Bath Road
Attendance: 421
Referee: Richard Parker-Sedgmore

3 April 2010

(BP) Canterbury	27 - 12	Barnes
	Report

Merton Lane
Attendance: 212
Referee: Simon Harding

3 April 2010

Dings Crusaders	17 - 15	Clifton (BP)
	Report

Landseer Avenue
Attendance: 256
Referee: Richard Kelly

3 April 2010

Lydney	21 - 14	Richmond (BP)
	Report

Regentsholme
Attendance: 250
Referee: Andrew Bickle

3 April 2010

Rosslyn Park	23 - 33	Worthing Raiders
	Report

The Rock
Attendance: 520
Referee: John Meredith

3 April 2010

Shelford	6 - 57	Henley Hawks (BP)
	Report

The Davey Field
Attendance: 426
Referee: Tom Davis

3 April 2010
15:00

Ealing Trailfinders	P - P	Westcombe Park

- Postponed. Game rescheduled to 8 May 2010.

Bye: Barking

=== Round 28 ===
10 April 2010

Barnes	24 - 21	Dings Crusaders (BP)
	Report

Barn Elms
Attendance: 75
Referee: Shane Lewis

10 April 2010

(BP) Clifton	24 - 42	Ealing Trailfinders (BP)
	Report

Station Road
Attendance: 262
Referee: Ian Tempest

10 April 2010

Richmond	10 - 35	Barking (BP)
	Report

Richmond Athletic Ground
Attendance: 683
Referee: Guy Steel Bodger

10 April 2010
15:00

(BP) Southend	32 - 29	Rosslyn Park (2BP)
	Report

Warners Bridge Park
Referee: Nick Cockburn

10 April 2010

(BP) Lydney	41 - 29	Shelford
	Report

Regentsholme
Attendance: 400
Referee: Matt Carley

10 April 2010

Westcombe Park	20 - 0 (Note: Westcombe Park awarded 20 - 0 win as Bridgwater & Albion were unable to contest game due to a lack of a front row.)	Bridgwater & Albion

10 April 2010

Worthing Raiders	22 - 15	Henley Hawks (BP)
	Report

Roundstone Lane
Attendance: 350
Referee: Claire Daniels

Bye: Canterbury

=== Round 29 ===
17 April 2010

(BP) Barking	96 - 14	Lydney
	Report

Goresbrook
Attendance: 365
Referee: Paul Kimber

17 April 2010

Bridgwater & Albion	17 - 47	Clifton (BP)
	Report

Bath Road
Attendance: 347
Referee: Matt Carley

17 April 2010

Canterbury	14 - 35	Richmond (BP)
	Report

Merton Lane
Attendance: 223
Referee: Shane Lewis

17 April 2010

(BP) Ealing Trailfinders	62 - 29	Barnes (BP)
	Report

Trailfinders Sports Ground
Attendance: 250
Referee: Terry Hall

17 April 2010
15:00

Henley Hawks	15 - 28	Southend (BP)
	Report

Dry Leas
Attendance: 245
Referee: S Leyshon

17 April 2010
15:00

(BP) Rosslyn Park	68 - 15	Westcombe Park
	Report

The Rock
Attendance: 650
Referee: Guy Steel Bodger

17 April 2010

Shelford	20 - 51	Worthing Raiders (BP)
	Report

The Davey Field
Attendance: 237
Referee: Will Halford

Bye: Dings Crusaders

=== Round 30 ===
24 April 2010

(BP) Barnes	56 - 24	Bridgwater & Albion (BP)
	Report

Barn Elms
Attendance: 50
Referee: Guy Steel Bodger

24 April 2010

Clifton	0 - 36	Rosslyn Park (BP)
	Report

Station Road
Attendance: 256
Referee: Ross Campbell

24 April 2010

(2BP) Lydney	27 - 28	Canterbury
	Report

Regentsholme
Attendance: 500
Referee: Luke Pearce

24 April 2010

(BP) Richmond	51 - 22	Dings Crusaders (BP)
	Report

Richmond Athletic Ground
Attendance: 327
Referee: Nick Cockburn

24 April 2010

Shelford	14 - 62	Barking (BP)
	Report

The Davey Field
Attendance: 271
Referee: Matt Carley

24 April 2010
15:00

(BP) Southend	38 - 14	Worthing Raiders
	Report

Warners Bridge Park
Attendance: 350

24 April 2010
15:00

Westcombe Park	15 - 40	Henley Hawks (BP)
	Report

Goddington Dene
Attendance: 235
Referee: Mark Varnon

Bye: Ealing Trailfinders

=== Rounds 17 & 21 (Rescheduled games) ===
1 May 2010

(BP) Barking	67 - 0	Dings Crusaders
	Report

Goresbrook
Attendance: 300
Referee: Wayne Falla

- Game rescheduled from 9 January 2010.

1 May 2010

Barnes	3 - 52	Henley Hawks (BP)

Barn Elms

- Game rescheduled from 9 January 2010.

1 May 2010

Canterbury	17 - 57	Rosslyn Park (BP)
	Report

Merton Lane
Attendance: 210
Referee: Mike Cooper

- Game rescheduled from 13 February 2010.

1 May 2010

(BP) Clifton	55 - 18	Worthing Raiders
	Report

Station Road
Attendance: 100
Referee: Guy Steel Bodger

- Game rescheduled from 9 January 2010.

1 May 2010

Lydney	8 - 50	Ealing Trailfinders (BP)
	Report

Regentsholme
Attendance: 400
Referee: Greg MacDonald

- Game rescheduled from 9 January 2010.

1 May 2010
15:00

Westcombe Park	7 - 64	Southend (BP)
	Report

Goddington Dene
Attendance: 180
Referee: Shane Lewis

- Game rescheduled from 9 January 2010.

=== Rounds 20 & 24 (Rescheduled games) ===
8 May 2010
15:00

(BP) Ealing Trailfinders	73 - 6	Westcombe Park
	Report

Trailfinders Sports Ground
Attendance: 300
Referee: Mike Cooper

- Rescheduled from 3 April 2010.

8 May 2010

(BP) Henley Hawks	42 - 8	Lydney
	Report

Dry Leas
Attendance: 280
Referee: Will Halford

- Rescheduled from 30 January 2010.

=== Promotion play-off ===
Each season, the runners-up in the National League 2 South and National League 2 North participate in a play-off for promotion into National League 1. Loughborough Students were runners-up in the North and would host the game as they had a better record in the league in comparison to the South runners up Rosslyn Park.

15 May 2010
15:00

Loughborough Students	21 - 43	Rosslyn Park
	Report

Loughborough University Stadium
Attendance: 1,000
Referee: Michael Tutty

== Total season attendances ==
Club	Home Games	Total	Average	Highest	Lowest	% Capacity
Barking	14	4,398	314	500	180	31%
Barnes	12 (Note: Missing attendance: 5 December 2009 v Canterbury.)	1,185	99	200	30	
Bridgwater & Albion	14	5,468	391	627	217	8%
Canterbury	14	2,617	187	247	124	12%
Clifton	14	2,663	190	287	80	9%
Dings Crusaders	14	1,745	125	256	101	8%
Ealing Trailfinders	11 (Note: Missing attendances: 28 November 2009 Southend, 2 January 2010 v Richmond, 27 February 2010 v Rosslyn Park.)	3,663	333	574	200	11%
Henley Hawks	14	4,010	286	375	210	7%
Lydney	14	5,900	421	650	250	14%
Richmond	14	7,922	566	1,473	114	13%
Rosslyn Park	14	6,310	451	780	210	23%
Shelford	13 (Note: Missing attendance: 26 September 2009 v Westcombe Park.)	3,107	239	426	137	12%
Southend	13 (Note: Missing attendance: 10 April 2010 v Rosslyn Park.)	3,370	259	550	150	17%
Westcombe Park	12 (Note: Home games against Bridgwater & Albion and Shelford cancelled.)	2,271	189	251	66	6%
Worthing Raiders	14	3,990	285	350	200	19%

== Individual statistics ==
- Note that points scorers includes tries as well as conversions, penalties and drop goals. Does not include North - South playoff game.

=== Top points scorers ===
Rank	Player	Team	Appearances	Points
1	(Scotland) Ross Laidlaw	Rosslyn Park	25	318
2	(England) Craig Ratford	Barking	26	277
3	(England) Matt Hart	Richmond	26	252
4	(England) Ben Ward	Ealing Trailfinders	28	245
5	(England) Edward Gough	Shelford	24	221
6	(England) Andy Frost	Southend	18	212
7	(England) Warren Gower	Barnes	28	203
8	(England) Lee Audis	Westcombe Park	25	171
9	(Wales) Matthew McLean	Worthing Raiders	18	163
10	(England) Phil Chesters	Ealing Trailfinders	26	140

=== Top try scorers ===
Rank	Player	Team	Appearances	Tries
1	(England) Phil Chesters	Ealing Trailfinders	26	28
2	(England) James Strong	Rosslyn Park	21	24
3	(England) Robert Viol	Clifton	27	22
3	(England) James Kellard	Barking	28	22
4	(England) Owen Bruynseels	Ealing Trailfinders	19	18
5	(England) Chris Jones	Barking	26	17
5	(England) David Vincent	Barking	27	17
6	(England) Peter Hodgkinson	Ealing Trailfinders	27	15
7	(England) Nick Fraser	Barking	26	14
8	(England) Paul Unseld	Rosslyn Park	11	13
8	(England) Guthrie Hall	Ealing Trailfinders	23	13
8	(England) Joe Govett	Worthing Raiders	24	13
8	(England) Marc Sweeney	Rosslyn Park	27	13

== Season records ==
=== Team ===
Largest home win — 82 pts

96 - 14 Barking at home to Lydney on 17 April 2010

Largest away win — 72 pts

75 - 3 Rosslyn Park away to Westcombe Park on 6 February 2010

Most points scored — 96 pts

96 - 14 Barking at home to Lydney on 17 April 2010

Most tries in a match — 14

Barking at home to Lydney on 17 April 2010

Most conversions in a match — 13

Barking at home to Lydney on 17 April 2010

Most penalties in a match — 6

Westcombe Park away to Henley Hawks on 5 September 2009

Most drop goals in a match — 3

Westcombe Park at home to Ealing Trailfinders on 5 December 2009

=== Player ===
Most points in a match — 31

(England) Craig Ratford for Barking at home to Lydney on 17 April 2010

Most tries in a match — 4 (x3)

(England) Rob Viol for Clifton at home to Richmond on 31 October 2009
(England) Paul Unseld for Rosslyn Park away to Westcombe Park on 6 February 2010
(England) James Strong for Rosslyn Park away to Henley Hawks on 27 March 2010

Most conversions in a match — 13

(England) Craig Ratford for Barking at home to Lydney on 17 April 2010

Most penalties in a match — 6

(England) Lee Audis for Westcombe Park away to Henley Hawks on 5 September 2009

Most drop goals in a match — 3

(England) Lee Audis for Westcombe Park at home to Ealing Trailfinders on 5 December 2009

=== Attendances ===
Highest — 1,473

Richmond at home to Rosslyn Park on 26 September 2009

Lowest — 30

Barnes at home to Shelford on 20 February 2010

Highest Average Attendance — 566

Richmond

Lowest Average Attendance — 99

Barnes

== See also ==
- English rugby union system
- Rugby union in England
