= 2014–15 National League 2 South =

Rugby union competition in England

- Countries: England
- Champions: Henley Hawks
- Runners-up: Bishop's Stortford (not promoted)
- Relegated: Dings Crusaders, Shelford, Lydney
- Matches played: 240
- Attendance: 94,033 (average 392 per match)
- Highest attendance: 1,687; Cambridge v Shelford; 10 January 2014
- Lowest attendance: 75; Clifton v Southend; 15 November 2014
- Top point scorer: (England) Gary Kingdom (Taunton Titans); 312 points
- Top try scorer: (England) Will Crow (Dorking); 22 tries

The 2014–15 National League 2 South is the sixth season (28th overall) of the fourth tier (south) of the English domestic rugby union competitions since the professionalised format of the second division was introduced. New teams to the division include Worthing Raiders (relegated from National League 1), Dorking and Old Elthamians (both promoted from National League 3 London & SE) and Lydney (promoted from National League 3 South West). The league system is 4 points for a win, 2 points for a draw and additional bonus points being awarded for scoring 4 or more tries and/or losing within 7 points of the victorious team. In terms of promotion the league champions would go straight up into National League 1 while the runners up would have a one-game playoff against the runners up from National League 2 North (at the home ground of the club with the superior league record) for the final promotion place.

During the course of the season the two league derby games between the Launceston and Redruth would also double up as the Cornish Super Cup with Launceston being the defending 2013–14 champions. Redruth won over two razor edge contests to take the 2014–15 Cornish Super Cup 29–28 on aggregate. Henley Hawks finished the season as champions and booked themselves an immediate return to National League 1 for the 2015–16 season by securing the league title and promotion on 28 March 2015, beating Shelford 66–17 at Dry Leas.

While Henley gained promotion early, the battle for second spot (and the chance to go up via the play-off) went right to the last day of the season with three teams looking to go up — Bishop's Stortford, Dorking and Taunton Titans. In the end, all three teams had bonus point victories but Bishop's Stortford's slender two point lead at the start of play meant they would finish as league runners–up. With only three victories all season Dings Crusaders were the first team to be relegated, followed some time later by Shelford with the third relegation spot much more keenly contested. A dramatic last day saw Lydney competing against Southend Saxons to avoid the drop. Lydney won their game with the maximum 5 points they needed but Southend managed to get a losing bonus point in their game and stayed up thanks to a better win record. Dings and Lydney would drop to National League 3 South West while Shelford would drop to National League 3 London & SE.

League runners up Bishop's Stortford would go into a playoff against the runners up of the 2014–15 National League 2 North, Ampthill, with Ampthill getting home advantage due to their better league record. It was the second time in a row that Ampthill were in the playoffs after somewhat ironically finishing second in National League 2 South the previous season. Bishop's Stortford lost a close game at Dillingham Park 10–19, with Ampthill gaining promotion to National League 1 for the 2015-16 season. In terms of attendances, National League 2 South had a total of 94,033 fans turning up for games across the season - up 14,405 from the previous season. This was helped by good regular crowds at Launceston and Redruth with 1,000+ attendances in the matches between the two Cornish sides while the two Cambridge–Shelford derby games attracted the biggest crowds of the season.

== Structure ==
The league consists of sixteen teams with all the teams playing each other on a home and away basis to make a total of thirty matches each. There is one automatic promotion place, one play-off place and three relegation places. The champions are promoted to 2015–16 National League 1 and the runners-up play the second-placed team in the 2014–15 National League 2 North with the winner being promoted. The last three teams are relegated to either National League 3 London & SE or National League 3 South West depending on the geographical location of the team (in some cases teams may join the Midlands regional leagues).

== Participating teams ==
Eleven of the teams listed below participated in the 2013–14 National League 2 South season; Henley Hawks and Worthing Raiders were relegated from National League 1, Dorking (champions) and Old Elthamians (play-offs) were promoted from National League 3 London & SE, Lydney were promoted from National League 3 South West and Ampthill were transferred back to National League 2 North to ensure that both leagues were suitably balanced with the same number of teams.

Team	Stadium	Capacity	City/Area
Bishop's Stortford	Silver Leys	1,600	Bishop's Stortford, Hertfordshire
Cambridge	Grantchester Road	2,200 (200 seats)	Cambridge, Cambridgeshire
Canterbury	Merton Lane	1,500 (75 seats)	Canterbury, Kent
Chinnor	Kingsey Road	2,000	Thame, Oxfordshire
Clifton	Station Road	2,200 (200 seats)	Cribbs Causeway, Patchway, Bristol
Dings Crusaders	Landseer Avenue	1,500	Lockleaze, Bristol
Dorking	The Big Field	1,000+	Dorking, Surrey
Henley Hawks	Dry Leas	4,000	Henley-on-Thames, Oxfordshire
Launceston	Polson Bridge	3,000	Launceston, Cornwall
Lydney	Regentsholme	3,000 (340 seats)	Lydney, Gloucestershire
Old Elthamians	Foxbury Avenue	1,300+	Chislehurst, Kent
Redruth	Recreation Ground	3,500 (580 seats)	Redruth, Cornwall
Shelford	The Davey Field	2,000 (150 seats)	Great Shelford, Cambridgeshire
Southend Saxons	Warners Park	1,500 (150 seats)	Southend, Essex
Taunton Titans	Hyde Park	2,000 (198 seats)	Taunton, Somerset
Worthing Raiders	Roundstone Lane	1,500 (100 seats)	Angmering, West Sussex

Locations of the 2014–15 National League 2 South teams

== Final league table ==
2014–15 National League 2 South table
Pos	Team	Pld	W	D	L	PF	PA	PD	TB	LB	Pts	Qualification
1	Henley Hawks (C)	30	24	1	5	956	567	+389	19	4	121	Promotion place
2	Bishop's Stortford	30	20	1	9	933	608	+325	22	8	112	Play-off place
3	Taunton Titans	30	22	0	8	863	591	+272	16	6	110	
4	Dorking	30	22	2	6	852	567	+285	12	4	108	
5	Worthing Raiders	30	19	0	11	804	605	+199	19	5	100	
6	Chinnor	30	18	0	12	780	639	+141	11	9	92	
7	Cambridge	30	17	0	13	765	662	+103	16	6	90	
8	Old Elthamians	30	12	1	17	693	736	−43	9	9	68	
9	Redruth	30	13	1	16	577	686	−109	6	6	66	
10	Launceston	30	12	2	16	625	595	+30	3	11	66	
11	Canterbury	30	11	2	17	640	721	−81	11	3	62	
12	Clifton	30	11	0	19	635	837	−202	9	6	59	
13	Southend Saxons	30	12	0	18	640	782	−142	6	7	56 (Note: Southend were deducted 5 points for playing an unregistered player against Clifton on 15 November 2014)	
14	Lydney (R)	30	11	1	18	546	871	−325	5	5	56	Relegation place
15	Shelford (R)	30	7	0	23	579	938	−359	9	4	36 (Note: Shelford were deducted 5 points for playing an unregistered player against Lydney on 6 September 2014)	Relegation place
16	Dings Crusaders (R)	30	3	1	26	526	1009	−483	5	3	22	Relegation place

Source: "National League 2 South". NCA Rugby.
Rules for classification: If teams are level at any stage, tiebreakers are applied in the following order:
1. Number of matches won
2. Difference between points for and against
3. Total number of points for
4. Aggregate number of points scored in matches between tied teams
5. Number of matches won excluding the first match, then the second and so on until the tie is settled
  Notes:

== Results ==
=== Round 1 ===
6 September 2014
14:30

Clifton	28–24	Canterbury (2BP)
	Report

Station Road
Attendance: 215
Referee: Christopher Ridley

6 September 2014
15:00

(BP) Chinnor	45–18	Dings Crusaders
	Report

Kingsey Road
Attendance: 720
Referee: Mike Hudson

6 September 2014
15:00

(BP) Dorking	10–13	Henley Hawks
	Report

The Big Field
Attendance: 325
Referee: Alex Manley

6 September 2014
15:00

(BP) Launceston	18–19	Bishop's Stortford
	Report

Polson Bridge
Attendance: 942
Referee: Richard Kelly

6 September 2014
15:00

Lydney	16–12	Shelford (BP)
	Report

Regentsholme
Attendance: 315
Referee: Dan Parrott

6 September 2014
15:00

(BP) Southend Saxons	31–36	Redruth (BP)
	Report

Warners Park Bridge
Attendance: 155
Referee: Luke Haskins

6 September 2014
15:00

(2BP) Worthing Raiders	30–33	Old Elthamians
	Report

Roundstone Lane
Attendance: 556
Referee: Veryan Boscawen

6 September 2014
15:30

(BP) Cambridge	24–29	Taunton Titans (BP)
	Report

Grantchester Road
Attendance: 388
Referee: Calum Howard

=== Round 2 ===
13 September 2014
14:30

Dings Crusaders	24–22	Lydney (BP)
	Report

Landseer Avenue
Attendance: 220
Referee: Luke Haskins

13 September 2014
15:00

(BP) Bishop's Stortford	32–19	Cambridge
	Report

Silver Leys
Attendance: 423
Referee: James Clarke

13 September 2014
15:00

Canterbury	28–15	Old Elthamians
	Report

Merton Lane
Attendance: 346
Referee: Alex Manley

13 September 2014
15:00

Dorking	8–5	Worthing Raiders (BP)
	Report

The Big Field
Attendance: 525
Referee: James Sullivan

13 September 2014
15:00

(BP) Henley Hawks	28–24	Chinnor (BP)
	Report

Dry Leas
Attendance: 470
Referee: Dan Parrott

13 September 2014
15:00

Redruth	14–13 (Note: First leg of 2014-15 Cornish Super Cup.)	Launceston (BP)
	Report

The Recreation Ground
Attendance: 1,320
Referee: Philip Davis

13 September 2014
15:00

Shelford	18–6	Southend Saxons
	Report

The Davey Field
Attendance: 183
Referee: Clare Hodnett

13 September 2014
15:00

(BP) Taunton Titans	38–24	Clifton (BP)
	Report

Hyde Park
Attendance: 250
Referee: Paul Kimber

=== Round 3 ===
20 September 2014
10:00

(BP) Chinnor	22–23	Dorking
	Report

Kingsey Road
Attendance: 400
Referee: Christopher Ridley

20 September 2014
14:30

(BP) Clifton	35–24	Bishop's Stortford (BP)
	Report

Station Road
Attendance: 115
Referee: Mike Hudson

20 September 2014
15:00

(BP) Cambridge	27–20	Redruth (BP)
	Report

Grantchester Road
Attendance: 412
Referee: Fergus Kirby

20 September 2014
15:00

Launceston	23–15	Shelford
	Report

Polson Bridge
Attendance: 466
Referee: Paul Kimber

20 September 2014
15:00

Lydney	17–43	Henley Hawks (BP)
	Report

Regentsholme
Attendance: 328
Referee: James Clarke

20 September 2014
15:00

(2BP) Old Elthamians	29–31	Taunton Titans
	Report

Foxbury Avenue
Attendance: 150
Referee: Dan Parrott

20 September 2014
15:00

(BP) Southend Saxons	52–14	Dings Crusaders
	Report

Warners Park Bridge
Attendance: 190
Referee: Rob Warburton

20 September 2014
15:00

(BP) Worthing Raiders	36–25	Canterbury (BP)
	Report

Roundstone Lane
Attendance: 436
Referee: Richard Kelly

=== Round 4 ===
27 September 2014
14:30

Dings Crusaders	22–35	Launceston
	Report

Landseer Avenue
Attendance: 121
Referee: Calum Howard

27 September 2014

(2BP) Bishop's Stortford	41–43	Old Elthamians (BP)
	Report

Silver Leys
Attendance: 380
Referee: Luke Haskins

27 September 2014

(BP) Chinnor	21–26	Worthing Raiders (BP)
	Report

Kingsey Road
Attendance: 400
Referee: Graham Dickens

27 September 2014

(BP) Dorking	52–3	Lydney
	Report

The Big Field
Attendance: 485
Referee: Mike Hudson

27 September 2014

(BP) Henley Hawks	31–13	Southend Saxons
	Report

Dry Leas
Attendance: 425
Referee: Christopher Ridley

27 September 2014

(BP) Redruth	20–23	Clifton
	Report

The Recreation Ground
Attendance: 760
Referee: Veryan Boscawen

27 September 2014
15:00

(BP) Shelford	32–11	Cambridge
	Report

The Davey Field
Attendance: 1,509
Referee: Alex Manley

27 September 2014
15:00

(BP) Taunton Titans	43–12	Canterbury
	Report

Hyde Park
Attendance: 250
Referee: Shane Lewis

=== Round 5 ===
4 October 2014
14:30

(2BP) Clifton	31–32	Shelford (BP)
	Report

Station Road
Attendance: 230
Referee: Luke Haskins

4 October 2014
15:00

Cambridge	27–17	Dings Crusaders
	Report

Grantchester Road
Attendance: 398
Referee: Graham Dickens

4 October 2014
15:00

Canterbury	10–22	Bishop's Stortford
	Report

Merton Lane
Attendance: 290
Referee: David Parsons

4 October 2014
15:00

Launceston	22–32	Henley Hawks
	Report

Polson Bridge
Attendance: 659
Referee: Dan Parrott

4 October 2014
15:00

(BP) Lydney	30–24	Chinnor (BP)
	Report

Regentsholme
Attendance: 359
Referee: Alex Manley

4 October 2014
15:00

Old Elthamians	13–12	Redruth (BP)
	Report

Foxbury Avenue
Attendance: 250
Referee: James Clarke

4 October 2014
15:00

(BP) Southend Saxons	13–18	Dorking
	Report

Warners Park Bridge
Attendance: 239
Referee: Calum Howard

4 October 2014
15:00

(BP) Worthing Raiders	27–29	Taunton Titans
	Report

Roundstone Lane
Attendance: 300
Referee: Paul Kimber

=== Round 6 ===
11 October 2014
15:00

(BP) Bishop's Stortford	34–20	Taunton Titans
	Report

Silver Leys
Attendance: 360
Referee: Ryan Smith

11 October 2014
15:00

(BP) Chinnor	42–21	Southend Saxons
	Report

Kingsey Road
Attendance: 291
Referee: James Clarke

11 October 2014
15:00

(BP) Dings Crusaders	19–21	Clifton

Landseer Avenue
Attendance: 679
Referee: Alex Manley

11 October 2014
15:00

Dorking	20–17	Launceston (BP)
	Report

The Big Field
Attendance: 280
Referee: David Parsons

11 October 2014
15:00

(BP) Henley Hawks	37–0	Cambridge
	Report

Dry Leas
Attendance: 535
Referee: Mike Hudson

11 October 2014
15:00

Lydney	18–17	Worthing Raiders (BP)
	Report

Regentsholme
Attendance: 401
Referee: Jake Makepeace

11 October 2014
15:00

(BP) Redruth	38–15	Canterbury
	Report

The Recreation Ground
Attendance: 726
Referee: Christophe Ridley

11 October 2014
15:00

(2BP) Shelford	28–33	Old Elthamians
	Report

Davey Field
Attendance: 265
Referee: Paul Kimber

=== Round 7 ===
18 October 2014
14:00

(BP) Worthing Raiders	24–22	Bishop's Stortford (2BP)
	Report

Roundstone Lane
Attendance: 516
Referee: Simon Harding

18 October 2014
14:30

Clifton	7–29	Henley Hawks
	Report

Station Road
Attendance: 180
Referee: Clare Hodnett

18 October 2014
15:00

Cambridge	14–28	Dorking
	Report

Grantchester Road
Attendance: 346
Referee: Ryan Smith

18 October 2014
15:00

(BP) Canterbury	37–22	Shelford
	Report

Merton Lane
Attendance: 504
Referee: Calum Howard

18 October 2014
15:00

(BP) Launceston	22–26	Chinnor
	Report

Polson Bridge
Attendance: 553
Referee: Mike Hudson

18 October 2014
15:00

(BP) Old Elthamians	38–29	Dings Crusaders
	Report

Foxbury Avenue
Attendance: 200
Referee: Paul Kimber

18 October 2014
15:00

(BP) Southend Saxons	50–13	Lydney
	Report

Warners Bridge Park
Attendance: 135
Referee: Louis Caviglia

18 October 2014
15:00

Taunton Titans	24–17	Redruth
	Report

Hyde Park
Attendance: 625
Referee: Daniel Parrott

=== Round 8 ===
25 October 2014
14:30

(BP) Dings Crusaders	36 - 36	Canterbury (BP)
	Report

Landseer Avenue
Attendance: 196
Referee: Daniel Parrott

25 October 2014
15:00

Chinnor	23 - 19	Cambridge (BP)
	Report

Kingsey Road
Attendance: 221
Referee: Rob Warburton

25 October 2014
15:00

(BP) Dorking	49 - 34	Clifton (BP)
	Report

The Big Field
Attendance: 338
Referee: Paul Kimber

25 October 2014
15:00

Lydney	20 - 19	Launceston (BP)
	Report

Regentsholme
Attendance: 438
Referee: Matthew Turvey

25 October 2014
15:00

(BP) Redruth	28 - 24	Bishop's Stortford (BP)
	Report

The Recreation Ground
Attendance: 734
Referee: Ian Bibey

25 October 2014
15:00

Shelford	19 - 28	Taunton Titans
	Report

The Davey Field
Attendance: 188
Referee: Christophe Ridley

25 October 2014
15:00

Southend Saxons	23 - 14	Worthing Raiders
	Report

Warners Bridge Park
Attendance: 256
Referee: David Clarkson

25 October 2014
15:30

(BP) Henley Hawks	48 - 19	Old Elthamians
	Report

Dry Leas
Attendance: 510
Referee: Shane Lewis

=== Round 9 ===
1 November 2014
14:00

(BP) Cambridge	50–20	Lydney
	Report

Grantchester Road
Attendance: 398
Referee: Richard Kelly

1 November 2014
14:00

Worthing Raiders	12–10	Redruth (BP)
	Report

Roundstone Lane
Attendance: 624
Referee: Calum Howard

1 November 2014
14:30

Bishop's Stortford	30–21	Shelford
	Report

Silver Leys
Attendance: 350
Referee: Phillip Davies

1 November 2014
14:30

Clifton	20–38	Chinnor (BP)
	Report

Station Road
Attendance: 136
Referee: Dan Parrott

1 November 2014
14:30

(BP) Launceston	21–22	Southend Saxons
	Report

Polson Bridge
Attendance: 538
Referee: Shane Lewis

1 November 2014
14:30

Old Elthamians	19–39	Dorking (BP)
	Report

Foxbury Avenue
Attendance: 380
Referee: Luke Haskins

1 November 2014
14:30

(BP) Taunton Titans	31–19	Dings Crusaders
	Report

Hyde Park
Attendance: 350
Referee: Mike Hudson

1 November 2014
15:00

(2 BP) Canterbury	29–30	Henley Hawks (BP)
	Report

Merton Lane
Attendance: 219
Referee: James Sullivan

=== Round 10 ===
8 November 2014
15:00

Chinnor	25–22	Old Elthamians (BP)
	Report

Kingsey Road
Attendance: 211
Referee: Calum Howard

8 November 2014
15:00

Dings Crusaders	8–34	Bishop's Stortford (BP)
	Report

Landseer Avenue
Attendance: 162
Referee: Simon Walker

8 November 2014
15:00

(BP) Dorking	46–19	Canterbury
	Report

The Big Field
Attendance: 332
Referee: David Parsons

8 November 2014
15:00

Henley Hawks	15–10	Taunton Titans (BP)
	Report

Dry Leas
Attendance: 345
Referee: Christopher Ridley

8 November 2014
15:00

Launceston	29–19	Worthing Raiders
	Report

Polson Bridge
Attendance: 411
Referee: Richard Kelly

8 November 2014
15:00

Lydney	P–P	Clifton

- Postponed due to waterlogged pitch. Game to be replayed on 28 February 2015.

8 November 2014
15:00

(BP) Shelford	31–11	Redruth
	Report

The Davey Field
Attendance: 296
Referee: Daniel Parrott

9 November 2014
15:00

Southend Saxons	20–36	Cambridge (BP)
	Report

Warners Bridge Park
Attendance: 374
Referee: Tom Davis

=== Round 11 ===
15 November 2014
14:00

(BP) Bishop's Stortford	13–19	Henley Hawks
	Report

Silver Leys
Attendance: 250
Referee: Tom Davies

15 November 2014
14:00

(BP) Cambridge	32–31	Launceston
	Report

Grantchester Road
Attendance: 424
Referee: Ben Blain

15 November 2014
14:00

(BP) Worthing Raiders	41–13	Shelford
	Report

Roundstone Lane
Attendance: 439
Referee: Christophe Ridley

15 November 2014
14:30

(BP) Clifton	51–18	Southend Saxons
	Report

Station Road
Attendance: 75
Referee: Paul Kimber

15 November 2014
14:30

(BP) Redruth	36–25	Dings Crusaders
	Report

The Recreation Ground
Attendance: 725
Referee: Calum Howard

15 November 2014
14:30

(BP) Taunton Titans	14–21	Dorking
	Report

Hyde Park
Attendance: 325
Referee: Daniel Parrott

15 November 2014
15:00

Canterbury	23–22	Chinnor (BP)
	Report

Merton Lane
Attendance: 219
Referee: James Sullivan

15 November 2014
15:00

(BP) Old Elthamians	38–18	Lydney
	Report

Foxbury Avenue
Attendance: 150
Referee: Alexis Manley

=== Round 12 ===
22 November 2014
14:00

Cambridge	14–28	Worthing Raiders (BP)
	Report

Grantchester Road
Attendance: 411
Referee: Mike Hudson

22 November 2014
14:30

(BP) Dings Crusaders	43–28	Shelford
	Report

Landseer Avenue
Attendance: 125
Referee: Daniel Parrott

22 November 2014
14:30

Dorking	23–22	Bishop's Stortford (2BP)
	Report

The Big Field
Attendance: 402
Referee: Calum Howard

22 November 2014
14:30

Launceston	23–16	Clifton (BP)
	Report

Polson Bridge
Attendance: 582
Referee: Philip Davies

22 November 2014
14:30

(BP) Southend Saxons	29–26	Old Elthamians (2BP)
	Report

Warners Bridge Park
Attendance: 125
Referee: Paul Dickens

22 November 2014
15:00

Chinnor	30–26	Taunton Titans (2BP)
	Report

Kingsey Road
Attendance: 197
Referee: Richard Kelly

22 November 2014
15:00

Henley Hawks	17–3	Redruth
	Report

Dry Leas
Attendance: 340
Referee: Paul Kimber

22 November 2014
15:00

Lydney	24–11	Canterbury
	Report

Regentsholme
Attendance: 397
Referee: Chris Newton

=== Round 13 ===
29 November 2014
14:00

(2BP) Worthing Raiders	24 - 28	Ding's Crusaders
	Report

Roundstone Lane
Attendance: 426
Referee: Calum Howard

29 November 2014
14:30

Bishop's Stortford	25 - 20	Chinnor (BP)
	Report

Silver Leys
Attendance: 220
Referee: Mike Hudson

29 November 2014
14:30

Clifton	12 - 9	Cambridge (BP)
	Report

Station Road
Attendance: 115
Referee: Dan Parott

29 November 2014
14:30

(BP) Old Elthamians	18 - 20	Launceston
	Report

Foxbury Avenue
Attendance: 120
Referee: Andrew McNeany

29 November 2014
14:30

Redruth	12 - 38	Dorking (BP)
	Report

The Recreation Ground
Attendance: 875
Referee: Christoph Ridley

29 November 2014
14:30

Shelford	21 - 59	Henley Hawks (BP)
	Report

The Davey Field
Attendance: 238
Referee: David Clarkson

29 November 2014
15:00

(BP) Canterbury	31 - 10	Southend Saxons
	Report

Merton Lane
Attendance: 256
Referee: Alexis Manley

29 November 2014
15:00

(BP) Taunton Titans	49 - 17	Lydney
	Report

Hyde Park
Attendance: 300
Referee: Shane Lewis

=== Round 14 ===
6 December 2014
14:00

(BP) Cambridge	39 - 33	Old Elthamians (2BP)
	Report

Grantchester Road
Attendance: 368
Referee: Matthew Turvey

6 December 2014
14:30

(BP) Chinnor	33 - 12	Redruth
	Report

Kingsey Road
Attendance: 167
Referee: Thomas Davis

6 December 2014
14:30

(2 BP) Clifton	34 - 40	Worthing Raiders (BP)
	Report

Station Road
Attendance: 166
Referee: Luke Haskins

6 December 2014
14:30

Dorking	28 - 20	Shelford
	Report

The Big Field
Attendance: 386
Referee: Jack Lewars

6 December 2014
14:30

Launceston	25 - 15	Canterbury
	Report

Polson Bridge
Attendance: 593
Referee: Dan Parrott

6 December 2014
14:30

Southend Saxons	18 - 8	Taunton Titans
	Report

Warners Bridge Park
Attendance: 97
Referee: David Clarkson

6 December 2014
15:00

(BP) Henley Hawks	58 - 10	Dings Crusaders
	Report

Dry Leas
Attendance: 445
Referee: Alexis Manley

6 December 2014
15:00

(BP) Lydney	26 - 43	Bishop's Stortford (BP)
	Report

Regentsholme
Attendance: 382
Referee: Ben Blain

=== Round 15 ===
13 December 2014
14:00

(BP) Bishop's Stortford	40–11	Southend Saxons
	Report

Silver Leys
Attendance: 270
Referee: Andrew MacNeaney

13 December 2014
14:00

(BP) Redruth	27–25	Lydney (BP)
	Report

The Recreation Ground
Attendance: 685
Referee: Calum Howard

13 December 2014
14:00

(BP) Worthing Raiders	30–7	Henley Hawks
	Report

Roundstone Lane
Attendance: 761
Referee: Gareth Holsgrove

13 December 2014
14:15

(BP) Shelford	12–14	Chinnor
	Report

The Davey Field
Attendance: 205
Referee: Claire Hodnett

13 December 2014
14:30

Dings Crusaders	19–32	Dorking (BP)
	Report

Landseer Avenue
Attendance: 139
Referee: Paul Kimber

13 December 2014
14:30

(BP) Old Elthamians	39–12	Clifton
	Report

Foxbury Avenue
Attendance: 120
Referee: Robbie Bourke

13 December 2014
14:30

Taunton Titans	23–20	Launceston (BP)
	Report

Hyde Park
Attendance: 515
Referee: James Sullivan

13 December 2014
15:00

Canterbury	5–36	Cambridge (BP)
	Report

Merton Lane
Attendance: 237
Referee: Alexis Manley

=== Round 16 ===
19 December 2014
19:45

(BP) Clifton	16–21	Taunton Titans
	Report

Station Road
Attendance: 163
Referee: Adam Leal

20 December 2014
14:00

(BP) Cambridge	33–32	Bishop's Stortford (2BP)
	Report

Grantchester Road
Attendance: 498
Referee: Claire Hodnett

20 December 2014
14:00

(BP) Worthing Raiders	32–27	Dorking (2BP)
	Report

Roundstone Lane
Attendance: 853
Referee: Calum Howard

20 December 2014
14:30

Chinnor	28–21	Henley Hawks (BP)
	Report

Kingsey Road
Attendance: 566
Referee: Thomas Davies

20 December 2014
14:30

Launceston	15–15 (Note: Second leg of 2014-15 Cornish Super Cup. Redruth win 29 - 28 on aggregate.)	Redruth
	Report

Polson Bridge
Attendance: 1,315
Referee: Shane Lewis

20 December 2014
14:30

Old Elthamians	18–8	Canterbury
	Report

Foxbury Avenue
Attendance: 150
Referee: Paul Kimber

20 December 2014
14:30

Southend Saxons	14–32	Shelford (BP)
	Report

Warners Bridge Park
Attendance: 165
Referee: Alexis Manley

20 December 2014
15:00

Lydney	21–6	Dings Crusaders
	Report

Regentsholme
Attendance: 611
Referee: Mike Hudson

=== Round 17 ===
3 January 2014
14:00

(BP) Bishop's Stortford	34–8	Clifton
	Report

Silver Leys
Attendance: 180
Referee: Matthew Turvey

3 January 2014
14:00

Redruth	17–7	Cambridge
	Report

The Recreation Ground
Attendance: 619
Referee: Paul Kimber

3 January 2014
14:15

(BP) Dorking	5–6	Chinnor
	Report

The Big Field
Attendance: 400
Referee: Phillip Davies

3 January 2014
14:30

(BP) Dings Crusaders	6–13	Southend Saxons
	Report

Landseer Avenue
Attendance: 120
Referee: Chris Newton

3 January 2014
14:30

(BP) Taunton Titans	22–15	Old Elthamians (BP)
	Report

Hyde Park
Attendance: 350
Referee: Dan Parrott

3 January 2014
15:00

Canterbury	12–20	Worthing Raiders
	Report

Merton Lane
Attendance: 237
Referee: Andrew MacNeaney

3 January 2014
15:00

(BP) Henley Hawks	50–5	Lydney
	Report

Dry Leas
Attendance: 425
Referee: Gareth Holsgrove

3 January 2014
15:00

Shelford	9–19	Launceston
	Report

The Davey Field
Attendance: 209
Referee: William Halford

=== Round 18 ===
10 January 2014
14:00

(BP) Cambridge	29–8	Shelford
	Report

Grantchester Road
Attendance: 1,687
Referee: Shane Lewis

10 January 2014
14:00

Old Elthamians	14–26	Bishop's Stortford (BP)
	Report

Foxbury Avenue
Attendance: 150
Referee: Shane Lewis

10 January 2014
14:00

(BP) Worthing Raiders	36–14	Chinnor
	Report

Roundstone Lane
Attendance: 632
Referee: James Clarke

10 January 2014
14:30

Clifton	30–22	Redruth
	Report

Station Road
Attendance: 158
Referee: Dan Parrott

10 January 2014
14:30

Launceston	18–8	Dings Crusaders
	Report

Polson Bridge
Attendance: 566
Referee: Alexis Manley

10 January 2014
14:30

Southend Saxons	18–17	Henley Hawks (BP)
	Report

Warners Bridge Park
Attendance: 215
Referee: Calum Howard

10 January 2014
15:00

Canterbury	19–14	Taunton Titans (BP)
	Report

Merton Lane
Attendance: 197
Referee: Paul Kimber

10 January 2014
15:00

Lydney	14–38	Dorking (BP)
	Report

Regentsholme
Attendance: 380
Referee: Claire Hodnett

=== Round 19 ===
17 January 2014
14:00

(BP) Bishop's Stortford	12–19	Canterbury
	Report

Silver Leys
Attendance: 260
Referee: James Sullivan

17 January 2014
14:00

Redruth	22–10	Old Elthamians
	Report

The Recreation Ground
Attendance: 815
Referee: Mike Hudson

17 January 2014
14:15

Dorking	P–P	Southend Saxons

- Postponed after a referee's assessment due to wet weather conditions rendering pitch unplayable. Game to be replayed on 28 February 2015.

17 January 2014
14:15

Shelford	24–37	Clifton
	Report

The Davey Field
Attendance: 188
Referee: David Clarkson

17 January 2014
14:30

(BP) Chinnor	22–17	Lydney (BP)
	Report

Kingsey Road
Attendance: 321
Referee: Calum Howard

17 January 2014
14:30

(BP) Dings Crusaders	0–5	Cambridge
	Report

Landseer Avenue
Attendance: 207
Referee: Clare Daniels

17 January 2014
14:30

Taunton Titans	30–17	Worthing Raiders
	Report

Hyde Park
Attendance: 425
Referee: Shane Lewis

17 January 2014
15:00

(BP) Henley Hawks	29–28	Launceston (2BP)
	Report

Dry Leas
Attendance: 515
Referee: Veryan Boscawen

=== Round 20 ===
24 January 2015
14:00

(2BP) Cambridge	27–32	Henley Hawks (BP)
	Report

Grantchester Road
Attendance: 432
Referee: James Clarke

24 January 2015
14:00

Launceston	17–17	Dorking
	Report

Polson Bridge
Attendance: 660
Referee: Paul Kimber

24 January 2015
14:00

Old Elthamians	23–3	Shelford
	Report

Foxbury Avenue
Attendance: 150
Referee: Dan Parrott

24 January 2015
14:00

(BP) Worthing Raiders	59–5	Lydney
	Report

Roundstone Lane
Attendance: 619
Referee: Mike Hudson

24 January 2015
14:30

(BP) Clifton	40–19	Dings Crusaders
	Report

Station Road
Attendance: 450
Referee: James Sullivan

24 January 2015
14:30

Southend Saxons	18–14	Chinnor (BP)
	Report

Warners Bridge Park
Attendance: 137
Referee: Alexis Manley

24 January 2015
14:30

(BP) Taunton Titans	22–17	Bishop's Stortford (BP)
	Report

Hyde Park
Attendance: 400
Referee: Thomas Davis

24 January 2015
15:00

(BP) Canterbury	28–23	Redruth (BP)
	Report

Merton Lane
Attendance: 183
Referee: Rob Warburton

=== Round 21 ===
31 January 2015
14:00

Bishop's Stortford	P–P	Worthing Raiders

- Postponed due to snow. Game to be replayed on 28 February 2015.

31 January 2015
14:00

Redruth	8–5	Taunton Titans (BP)
	Report

The Recreation Ground
Attendance: 730
Referee: Ian Bibey

31 January 2015
14:15

Dorking	16–15	Cambridge (BP)
	Report

The Big Field
Attendance: 482
Referee: Mike Hudson

31 January 2015
14:15

Shelford	8–0	Canterbury
	Report

The Davey Field
Attendance: 132
Referee: Paul Kimber

31 January 2015
14:30

(BP) Chinnor	24–12	Launceston
	Report

Kingsey Road
Attendance: 157
Referee: Luis Caviglia

31 January 2015
14:30

Dings Crusaders	6–25	Old Elthamians (BP)
	Report

Landseer Avenue
Attendance: 157
Referee: Veryan Boscawen

31 January 2015
15:00

(BP) Henley Hawks	32–17	Clifton
	Report

Dry Leas
Attendance: 470
Referee: Shane Lewis

31 January 2015
15:00

Lydney	25–20	Southend Saxons (BP)
	Report

Regentsholme
Attendance: 392
Referee: Jack Makepeace

=== Round 22 ===
7 February 2015
14:00

Cambridge	22–14	Chinnor
	Report

Grantchester Road
Attendance: 412
Referee: Andrew MacNeaney

7 February 2015
14:00

(BP) Worthing Raiders	33–11	Southend Saxons
	Report

Roundstone Lane
Attendance: 432
Referee: Paul Kimber

7 February 2015
14:30

(BP) Bishop's Stortford	45–20	Redruth
	Report

Silver Leys
Attendance: 210
Referee: James Sullivan

7 February 2015
14:30

(BP) Clifton	11–15	Dorking
	Report

Station Road
Attendance: 175
Referee: James Clarke

7 February 2015
14:30

Launceston	16–13	Lydney (BP)
	Report

Polson Bridge
Attendance: 746
Referee: Luke Haskins

7 February 2015
15:00

(BP) Canterbury	31–14	Dings Crusaders
	Report

Merton Lane
Attendance: 206
Referee: Robbie Bourke

7 February 2015
15:00

(BP) Old Elthamians	18–23	Henley Hawks
	Report

Foxbury Avenue
Attendance: 200
Referee: Christopher Ridley

7 February 2015
15:00

(BP) Taunton Titans	33–17	Shelford
	Report

Hyde Park
Attendance: 215
Referee: Luis Caviglia

=== Round 23 ===
14 February 2015
14:00

Dorking	13–6	Old Elthamians (BP)
	Report

The Big Field
Attendance: 312
Referee: Andrew Rawson

14 February 2015
14:30

(BP) Dings Crusaders	26–54	Taunton Titans (BP)
	Report

Landseer Avenue
Attendance: 163
Referee: Luke Haskins

14 February 2015
14:30

Redruth	22–17	Worthing Raiders (BP)
	Report

The Recreation Ground
Attendance: 690
Referee: James Sullivan

14 February 2015
14:00

Shelford	14–54	Bishop's Stortford (BP)
	Report

The Davey Field
Attendance: 349
Referee: Alexis Manley

14 February 2015
15:00

(2BP) Chinnor	29–32	Clifton (BP)
	Report

Kingsey Road
Attendance: 297
Referee: Paul Kimber

14 February 2015
15:00

(BP) Henley Hawks	39–24	Canterbury
	Report

Dry Leas
Attendance: 345
Referee: Mike Hudson

14 February 2015
15:00

(BP) Lydney	18–24	Cambridge (BP)
	Report

Regentsholme
Attendance: 326
Referee: David Clarkson

14 February 2015
15:00

Southend Saxons	22–21	Launceston (BP)
	Report

Warners Bridge Park
Attendance: 125
Referee: Calum Howard

=== Round 24 ===
21 February 2015
14:00

(BP) Cambridge	26–19	Southend Saxons (BP)
	Report

Grantchester Road
Attendance: 432
Referee: Calum Howard

21 February 2015
14:00

(BP) Worthing Raiders	25–13	Launceston
	Report

Roundstone Lane
Attendance: 436
Referee: Philip Davies

21 February 2015
14:30

(BP) Bishop's Stortford	50–0	Dings Crusaders
	Report

Silver Leys
Attendance: 260
Referee: Claire Hodnett

21 February 2015
14:30

Clifton	10–19	Lydney
	Report

Station Road
Attendance: 186
Referee: Ben Blain

21 February 2015
14:30

Old Elthamians	24–26	Chinnor (BP)
	Report

Foxbury Avenue
Attendance: 150
Referee: David Clarkson

21 February 2015
14:30

(BP) Redruth	41–5	Shelford
	Report

The Recreation Ground
Attendance: 665
Referee: Shane Lewis

21 February 2015
15:00

Canterbury	15–15	Dorking
	Report

Merton Lane
Attendance: 237
Referee: Alexis Manley

21 February 2015
15:00

(BP) Taunton Titans	28–34	Henley Hawks (BP)
	Report

Hyde Park
Attendance: 650
Referee: Thomas Davies

=== Rounds 10, 19 & 21 (rescheduled matches) ===
28 February 2015
14:00

(BP) Bishop's Stortford	29–10	Worthing Raiders
	Report

Silver Leys
Attendance: 270
Referee: Luis Caviglia

28 February 2015
15:00

(BP) Dorking	19–25	Southend Saxons
	Report

The Big Field
Attendance: 282
Referee: Gareth Holsgrove

28 February 2015
15:00

(BP) Lydney	39–14	Clifton
	Report

Regentsholme
Attendance: 422
Referee: Craig Maxwell Keys

=== Round 25 ===
7 March 2015
14:30

Dings Crusaders	20–29	Redruth
	Report

Landseer Avenue
Attendance: 169
Referee: Neil Chivers

7 March 2015
14:30

Launceston	7–28	Cambridge (BP)
	Report

Polson Bridge
Attendance: 635
Referee: Veryan Boscawen

7 March 2015
15:00

Chinnor	14–3	Canterbury
	Report

Kingsey Road
Attendance: 253
Referee: Ian Bibey

7 March 2015
15:00

Dorking	17–51	Taunton Titans (BP)
	Report

The Big Field
Attendance: 427
Referee: Christophe Ridley

7 March 2015
15:00

(BP) Henley Hawks	34–34	Bishop's Stortford (BP)
	Report

Dry Leas
Attendance: 670
Referee: Claire Hodnett

7 March 2015
15:00

Lydney	23–23	Old Elthamians
	Report

Regentsholme
Attendance: 461
Referee: Andrew Rawson

7 March 2015
15:00

Shelford	13–40	Worthing Raiders (BP)
	Report

The Davey Field
Attendance: 218
Referee: Alexis Manley

7 March 2015
15:00

(BP) Southend Saxons	36–18	Clifton
	Report

Warners Bridge Park
Attendance: 166
Referee: Thomas Davies

=== Round 26 ===
14 March 2015
14:30

Clifton	8–29	Launceston (BP)
	Report

Station Road
Attendance: 153
Referee: Ben Davis

14 March 2015
14:30

(BP) Taunton Titans	35–14	Chinnor
	Report

Hyde Park
Attendance: 430
Referee: Alexis Manley

14 March 2015
15:00

(BP) Bishop's Stortford	32–8	Dorking
	Report

Silver Leys
Attendance: 315
Referee: James Clarke

14 March 2015
15:00

Canterbury	22–9	Lydney
	Report

Merton Lane
Attendance: 312
Referee: Rob Warburton

14 March 2015
15:00

(BP) Old Elthamians	51–28	Southend Saxons (BP)
	Report

Foxbury Avenue
Attendance: 150
Referee: Luis Caviglia

14 March 2015
15:00

Redruth	13–28	Henley Hawks
	Report

The Recreation Ground
Attendance: 825
Referee: Christophe Ridley

14 March 2015
15:00

(BP) Shelford	43–29	Dings Crusaders (BP)
	Report

The Davey Field
Attendance: 132
Referee: Calum Howard

14 March 2015
15:00

Worthing Raiders	19–43	Cambridge (BP)
	Report

Roundstone Lane
Attendance: 449
Referee: Chris Newton

=== Round 27 ===
28 March 2015
14:30

Dings Crusaders	5–31	Worthing Raiders (BP)
	Report

Landseer Avenue
Attendance: 172
Referee: Graeme Ormiston

28 March 2015
15:00

(BP) Cambridge	46–7	Clifton
	Report

Grantchester Road
Attendance: 443
Referee: Robbie Bourke

28 March 2015
15:00

(2BP) Chinnor	45–46	Bishop's Stortford (BP)
	Report

Kingsey Road
Attendance: 260
Referee: James Sullivan

28 March 2015
15:00

(BP) Dorking	50–7	Redruth
	Report

The Big Field
Attendance: 475
Referee: Philip Davies

28 March 2015
15:00

(BP) Henley Hawks	66–17	Shelford
	Report

Dry Leas
Attendance: 605
Referee: James Clark

28 March 2015
15:00

(BP) Launceston	29–5	Old Elthamians
	Report

Polson Bridge
Attendance: 559
Referee: Paul Kimber

28 March 2015
15:00

Lydney	7–33	Taunton Titans (BP)
	Report

Regentsholme
Attendance: 406
Referee: Mike Hudson

28 March 2015
15:00

(BP) Southend Saxons	21–26	Canterbury (BP)
	Report

Warners Bridge Park
Attendance: 220
Referee: Luke Haskins

=== Round 28 ===
11 April 2015
14:30

(BP) Bishop's Stortford	38–7	Lydney
	Report

Silver Leys
Attendance: 410
Referee: Philip Davies

11 April 2015
14:30

Dings Crusaders	22–38	Henley Hawks (BP)
	Report

Landseer Avenue
Attendance: 163
Referee: Christopher Newton

11 April 2015
15:00

(BP) Canterbury	18–20	Launceston
	Report

Merton Lane
Attendance: 304
Referee: Veryan Boscawen

11 April 2015
15:00

Old Elthamians	27–26	Cambridge (2BP)
	Report

Foxbury Avenue
Attendance: 200
Referee: Neil Chivers

11 April 2015
15:00

Redruth	7–31	Chinnor (BP)
	Report

The Recreation Ground
Attendance: 713
Referee: Sara Cox

11 April 2015
15:00

(BP) Shelford	33–64	Dorking (BP)
	Report

The Davey Field
Attendance: 334
Referee: Robert Bourke

11 April 2015
15:00

(BP) Taunton Titans	52–18	Southend
	Report

Hyde Park
Attendance: 325
Referee: James Clark

11 April 2015
15:00

(BP) Worthing Raiders	24–17	Clifton (BP)
	Report

Roundstone Lane
Attendance: 748
Referee: Mike Hudson

=== Round 29 ===
18 April 2015
14:30

Clifton	17–7	Old Elthamians
	Report

Station Road
Attendance: 189
Referee: Brendan McGaffney

18 April 2015
15:00

(BP) Cambridge	58–49	Canterbury (BP)
	Report

Grantchester Road
Attendance: 632
Referee: Tom Davis

18 April 2015
15:00

(BP) Chinnor	52–13	Shelford
	Report

Kingsey Road
Attendance: 379
Referee: Calum Howard

18 April 2015
15:00

(BP) Dorking	62–19	Dings Crusaders

The Big Field
Attendance: 1,065
Referee: Paul Kimber

18 April 2015
15:00

(2BP) Henley Hawks	22–28	Worthing Raiders (BP)
	Report

Dry Leas
Attendance: 525
Referee: Alexis Manley

18 April 2015
15:00

Launceston	19–30	Taunton Titans (BP)
	Report

Polson Bridge
Attendance: 863
Referee: Mike Hudson

18 April 2015
15:00

(BP) Lydney	29–17	Redruth
	Report

Regentsholme
Attendance: 530
Referee: Jack Makepeace

18 April 2015
15:00

(2BP) Southend Saxons	26–27	Bishop's Stortford (BP)
	Report

Warners Bridge Park
Attendance: 453
Referee: Rob Warburton

=== Round 30 ===
25 April 2015
14:30

(BP) Bishop's Stortford	31–24	Launceston (BP)
	Report

Silver Leys
Attendance: 725
Referee: Thomas Davis

25 April 2015
14:30

Dings Crusaders	21–38	Chinnor (BP)
	Report

Landseer Avenue
Attendance: 120
Referee: Adam Leal

25 April 2015
15:00

(BP) Canterbury	48–5	Clifton
	Report

Merton Lane
Attendance: 357
Referee: David Clarkson

25 April 2015
15:00

(2BP) Henley Hawks	34–41	Dorking (BP)
	Report

Dry Leas
Attendance: 865
Referee: Alexis Manley

25 April 2015
15:00

Old Elthamians	18–35	Worthing Raiders (BP)
	Report

Foxbury Avenue
Attendance: 465
Referee: Andrew MacEaney

25 April 2015
15:00

Redruth	18–15	Southend Saxons (BP)
	Report

The Recreation Ground
Attendance: 825
Referee: Calum Howard

25 April 2015
15:00

(2BP) Shelford	24–26	Lydney (BP)
	Report

The Davey Field
Attendance: 257
Referee: Paul Kimber

25 April 2015
15:00

(BP) Taunton Titans	30–20	Cambridge
	Report

Hyde Park
Attendance: 580
Referee: Daniel Parrott

=== Promotion play-off ===
Each season, the runners-up in the National League 2 South and National League 2 North participate in a play-off for promotion into National Division 1. Ampthill were runners-up in the North and because they had a better record than the South runners-up, Bishop's Stortford they hosted the play-off match.

Team	Pld	W	D	L	PF	PA	PD	TB	LB	Pts
Ampthill	30	26	1	3	1113	440	+673	23	2	131
Bishop's Stortford	30	20	1	9	933	608	+325	22	8	112

2 May 2015
15:00

Ampthill	19–10	Bishop's Stortford

Dillingham Park
Attendance: 1,253
Referee: Marcus Caton

== Total season attendances ==
Club	Home games	Total	Average	Highest	Lowest	% Capacity
Bishop's Stortford	15	4,883	326	725	180	20%
Cambridge	15	7,681	512	1,687	346	23%
Canterbury	15	4,104	274	504	183	18%
Chinnor	15	4,840	323	720	157	16%
Clifton	15	2,706	180	450	75	8%
Dings Crusaders	15	2,913	194	679	120	13%
Dorking	15	6,516	434	1,065	280	43%
Henley Hawks	15	7,490	499	865	340	12%
Launceston	15	10,088	673	1,315	411	22%
Lydney	15	6,148	410	611	315	14%
Old Elthamians	15	2,985	199	465	120	19%
Redruth	15	11,707	780	1,320	619	22%
Shelford	15	4,703	314	1,509	132	16%
Southend Saxons	15	3,052	203	453	97	14%
Taunton Titans	15	5,990	399	650	215	20%
Worthing Raiders	15	8,227	548	853	300	35%

== Individual statistics ==
- Note that points scorers includes tries as well as conversions, penalties and drop goals. Appearance figures also include coming on as substitutes (unused substitutes not included).

=== Top points scorers ===
Rank	Player	Team	Appearances	Points
1	(England) Gary Kingdom	Taunton Titans	29	307
2	(Wales) Matthew McLean	Worthing Raiders	30	298
3	(England) Keiron Lewitt	Launceston	27	257
4	(England) Tom White	Old Elthamians	28	254
5	(England) Ed Keohane	Chinnor	28	238
6	(England) Matt Noble	Dorking	20	197
7	(England) Mark Woodrow	Dings Crusaders	25	190
8	(England) Bradley Burr	Southend Saxons	28	183
9	(England) Steven Smith	Shelford	27	175
10	(England) Tom Coleman	Bishop's Stortford	27	148

=== Top try scorers ===
Rank	Player	Team	Appearances	Tries
1	(England) Will Crow	Dorking	30	22
2	(England) Nick Hankin	Bishop's Stortford	29	21
3	(New Zealand) Mason Rosvall	Canterbury	28	20
4	(England) Ryan Jeffery	Dorking	29	18
4	(Wales) Matthew McLean	Worthing Raiders	30	18
5	(England) Alex Nielsen	Worthing Raiders	21	17
6	(Samoa) Alfie Vaeluaga	Chinnor	24	16
6	(England) Reuben Haile	Chinnor	27	16
7	(England) Simon Hunt	Dings Crusaders	25	14
7	(England) Albert Portsmouth	Cambridge	29	14
7	(England) Lewis Webb	Taunton Titans	29	14

== Season records ==
=== Team ===
Largest home win – 58 pts

63–5 Henley Hawks at home to Dings Crusaders on 6 December 2014

Largest away win – 40 pts

54–14 Bishop's Stortford away to Shelford on 14 February 2015

Most points scored – 66 pts

66–17 Henley Hawks at home to Shelford on 28 March 2015

Most tries in a match – 12

Henley Hawks at home to Shelford on 28 March 2015

Most conversions in a match – 7 (x4)

Worthing Raiders at home to Lydney on 24 January 2015
Bishop's Stortford away to Shelford on 14 February 2015
Henley Hawks at home to Shelford on 28 March 2015
Dorking away to Shelford on 11 April 2015

Most penalties in a match – 7

Launceston away to Dings Crusaders on 27 September 2014

Most drop goals in a match – 2

Taunton Titans away to Worthing Raiders on 4 October 2014

=== Player ===
Most points in a match – 27

(England) Charles Foley for Clifton away to Shelford on 17 January 2015

Most tries in a match – 4 (x3)

(England) Ruben Haile for Chinnor at home to Southend Saxons on 11 October 2014
(England) Joe Collingham for Cambridge away to Southend Saxons on 9 November 2014
(England) Lloyd Owen for Henley Hawks at home to Dings Crusaders on 6 December 2014

Most conversions in a match – 7 (x2)

(Wales) Matthew McLean for Worthing Raiders at home to Lydney on 24 January 2015
(England) James Combden for Henley Hawks at home to Shelford on 28 March 2015

Most penalties in a match – 7

(England) Kieron Lewitt for Launceston away to Dings Crusaders on 27 September 2014

Most drop goals in a match – 1

N/A - multiple players

=== Attendances ===
Highest – 1,687

Cambridge against Shelford on 10 January 2014

Lowest – 75

Clifton against Southend on 15 November 2014

Highest Average Attendance – 780

Redruth

Lowest Average Attendance – 180

Clifton

== See also ==
- English rugby union system
- Rugby union in England
