= 2014–15 National League 2 North =

Rugby union competition in England

- Countries: England
- Champions: Hull Ionians
- Runners-up: Ampthill (also promoted)
- Relegated: Stockport, Hull, Birmingham & Solihull
- Matches played: 240
- Attendance: 62,781 (average 262 per match)
- Highest attendance: 1,201; Preston Grasshoppers v Caldy; 18 April 2015
- Lowest attendance: 54; Leicester Lions av Chester; 14 March 2015
- Top point scorer: (England) Joe Tarrant (Ampthill); 310 points
- Top try scorer: (England) Joe Bercis (Ampthill); 31 tries

The 2014–15 National League 2 North is the sixth season (28th overall) of the fourth tier of the English domestic rugby union competitions since the professionalised format of the second division was introduced. New teams to the division include Hull Ionians (relegated from National League 1 2013–14), Broadstreet (promoted from National League 3 Midlands), Huddersfield and Stockport (both promoted from National League 3 North). Ampthill was also transferred back to the division after spending the 2013–14 season in National League 2 South. At the end of the season the champions are promoted to National League 1 while the second placed team will play against the runners-up from the 2014–15 National League 2 South, with the winner also promoted. The bottom three teams, depending on geographical location, are usually relegated to either National League 3 North or National League 3 Midlands (in some cases teams may be relegated to the southern regional leagues).

Hull Ionians claimed the title and promotion to National League 1 on the last day of the season, with Ampthill finishing as runners-up and having to be content with a promotion play-off. Both Hull Ionians and Ampthill were head and shoulders over the other teams in the division, with Ionians narrow 7 – 6 victory over Ampthill on 24 January ultimately being the deciding factor in who would end up as champions.

While the title chase was tight, the fight against relegation was even tighter. Apart from Stockport, who were relegated way before the end of the season, the next two relegation spots were contested up until the very last game with four teams in danger of the drop. In the end Hull's defeat to fellow relegation rivals Preston Grasshoppers meant they went straight down, while Birmingham & Solihull's bonus point victory was not enough due to Luctonians narrow win over Leicester Lions, meaning that Luctonians stayed up instead. On paper Birmingham & Solihull had a better attack and defence than Luctonians but were unable to translate this to enough wins over the course of the season. Stockport and Hull would drop down to National League 3 North while Birmingham & Solihull would go into National League 3 Midlands.

As runner-up, Ampthill played in the divisional play-off for the second year in a row (they lost the play-off in 2013–14 against Darlington Mowden Park). This year they played at home to National League 2 South runner-up Bishop's Stortford. The final result was 19 – 10 to Ampthill at Dillingham Park, and they join Hull Ionians in the 2015–16 National League 1.

== Structure ==
The league consists of sixteen teams with all the teams playing each other on a home and away basis to make a total of thirty matches each. There is one automatic promotion place, one play-off place and three relegation places. The champions are promoted to the 2015–16 National League 1 and the runner-up play the second-placed team in the 2014–15 National League 2 South with the winner being promoted. The last three teams are relegated to either National League 3 Midlands or National League 3 North depending on the geographical location of the team.

== Participating teams and locations ==
Eleven of the teams listed below participated in the 2013–14 National League 2 North season; Hull Ionians were relegated from National League 1, Huddersfield (champions) and Stockport (play-offs) were promoted from National League 3 North, Broadstreet were promoted from National League 3 Midlands and Ampthill were transferred from National League 2 South to ensure that both leagues were suitably balanced with the same number of teams.

Locations of the 2014–15 National League 2 North teams

Team	Stadium	Capacity	City/Area	Previous season
Ampthill	Dillingham Park	3,000	Ampthill, Bedfordshire	transferred from National League 2 South
Birmingham & Solihull	Portway		Portway, Birmingham, West Midlands	6th
Broadstreet	Ivor Preece Field	1,500 (250 seats)	Coventry, West Midlands	Promoted from National League 3 Midlands (1st)
Caldy	Paton Field	4,000	Thurstaston, Wirral, Merseyside	8th
Chester	Hare Lane	2,000 (500 seats)	Chester, Cheshire	5th
Harrogate	Claro Road	4,500 (500 seats)	Harrogate, North Yorkshire	9th
Huddersfield	Lockwood Park	1,500 (500 seats)	Huddersfield, West Yorkshire	Promoted from National League 3 North (1st)
Hull	Ferens Ground	1,500 (288 seats)	Kingston upon Hull, East Riding of Yorkshire	13th
Hull Ionians	Brantingham Park	1,500 (240 seats)	Brantingham, East Riding of Yorkshire	Relegated from National League 1 (16th)
Leicester Lions	Westleigh Park	2,000	Blaby, Leicestershire	7th
Luctonians	Mortimer Park	2,500 (300 seats)	Kingsland, Herefordshire	10th
Otley	Cross Green	7,000 (852 seats)	Otley, Leeds, West Yorkshire	12th
Preston Grasshoppers	Lightfoot Green	2,250 (250 seats)	Preston, Lancashire	11th
Sedgley Park	Park Lane	3,000	Whitefield, Bury, Greater Manchester	4th
Stockport	The Memorial Ground	500	Stockport, Greater Manchester	Promoted from National League 3 North (via play-off)
Stourbridge	Stourton Park	3,500 (499 seats)	Stourbridge, West Midlands	3rd

== League table ==
2014–15 National League 2 North table
Pos	Team	Pld	W	D	L	PF	PA	PD	TB	LB	Pts	Qualification
1	Hull Ionians (C)	30	27	0	3	976	407	+569	25	1	134	Promotion place
2	Ampthill (P)	30	26	1	3	1113	440	+673	23	2	131	Play-off place
3	Sedgley Park	30	18	1	11	881	666	+215	16	4	94	
4	Harrogate	30	17	3	10	720	652	+68	11	4	89	
5	Chester	30	16	1	13	706	595	+111	12	6	84	
6	Caldy	30	16	1	13	696	720	−24	11	7	84	
7	Broadstreet	30	17	0	13	773	687	+86	11	4	83	
8	Otley	30	13	1	16	676	682	−6	13	8	75	
9	Huddersfield	30	14	2	14	586	658	−72	7	4	71	
10	Stourbridge	30	12	1	17	740	803	−63	12	7	69	
11	Leicester Lions	30	13	0	17	612	804	−192	10	2	64	
12	Preston Grasshoppers	30	11	0	19	621	664	−43	10	10	64	
13	Luctonians	30	11	1	18	599	766	−167	10	5	61	
14	Birmingham & Solihull (R)	30	9	2	19	724	809	−85	8	10	58	Relegation place
15	Hull (R)	30	10	1	19	543	836	−293	9	3	54	Relegation place
16	Stockport (R)	30	2	1	27	444	1221	−777	5	4	19	Relegation place

Updated to match(es) played on 2 May 2015. Source: "National League 2 North". NCA Rugby.
Rules for classification: If teams are level at any stage, tiebreakers are applied in the following order:
1. Number of matches won
2. Difference between points for and against
3. Total number of points for
4. Aggregate number of points scored in matches between tied teams
5. Number of matches won excluding the first match, then the second and so on until the tie is settled

== Results ==
=== Round 1 ===
6 September 2014
14:00

(BP) Birmingham & Solihull	23 – 25	Otley
	Report

Portway
Attendance: 197
Referee: Brendan McGaffney

6 September 2014
14:00

Leicester Lions	11 – 5	Luctonians (BP)
	Report

Westleigh Park
Attendance: 105
Referee: Clare Hodnett

6 September 2014
14:30

(BP) Preston Grasshoppers	11 – 16	Hull
	Report

Lightfoot Green
Attendance: 217
Referee: Karl Kirkpatrick

6 September 2014
14:30

Sedgley Park	24 – 15	Broadstreet
	Report

Park Lane
Attendance: 247
Referee: Andrew Taylorson

6 September 2014
15:00

(BP) Ampthill	48 – 0	Stockport
	Report

Dillingham Park
Attendance: 215
Referee: James Clarke

6 September 2014
15:00

Chester	23 – 17	Huddersfield (BP)
	Report

Hare Lane
Attendance: 200
Referee: Chris Bennett

6 September 2014
15:00

(BP) Harrogate	11 – 17	Stourbridge
	Report

Claro Road
Attendance: 300
Referee: Graham Dickens

6 September 2014
15:00

(BP) Hull Ionians	45 – 17	Caldy
	Report

Brantingham Park
Attendance: 240
Referee: Mick Harris

=== Round 2 ===
13 September 2014
15:00

(BP) Ampthill	66 – 7	Leicester Lions
	Report

Dillingham Park
Attendance: 176
Referee: Mike Hudson

13 September 2014
15:00

(BP) Birmingham & Solihull	36 – 38	Broadstreet (BP)
	Report

Portway
Attendance: 205
Referee: Chris Bennett

13 September 2014
15:00

Caldy	21 – 15	Chester (BP)
	Report

Paton Field
Attendance: 397
Referee: Will Halford

13 September 2014
15:00

Huddersfield	18 – 18	Harrogate
	Report

Lockwood Park
Attendance: 178
Referee: Brendan McGaffney

13 September 2014
15:00

Hull	10 – 44	Hull Ionians (BP)
	Report

Ferens Ground
Attendance: 150
Referee: Mick Harris

13 September 2014
15:00

(BP) Otley	17 – 24	Preston Grasshoppers
	Report

Cross Green
Attendance: 289
Referee: Graham Dickens

13 September 2014
15:00

Stockport	10 – 85	Sedgley Park (BP)
	Report

The Memorial Ground
Attendance: 200
Referee: Karl Kirkpatrick

13 September 2014
15:00

(BP) Stourbridge	27 – 18	Luctonians
	Report

Stourton Park
Attendance: 600
Referee: Christopher Ridley

=== Round 3 ===
20 September 2014
14:00

(BP) Birmingham & Solihull	28 – 9	Stockport
	Report

Portway
Attendance: 227
Referee: Brendan McGaffney

20 September 2014
14:00

(BP) Leicester Lions	42 – 17	Stourbridge
	Report

Westleigh Park
Attendance: 145
Referee: Calum Howard

20 September 2014
14:30

(BP) Preston Grasshoppers	32 – 13	Broadstreet
	Report

Lightfoot Green
Attendance: 262
Referee: Mick Harris

20 September 2014
14:30

Sedgley Park	20 – 32	Ampthill (BP)
	Report

Park Lane
Attendance: 212
Referee: Chris Bennett

20 September 2014
15:00

(BP) Chester	32 – 0	Hull
	Report

Hare Lane
Attendance: 300
Referee: Graham Dickens

20 September 2014
15:00

(BP) Luctonians	29 – 23	Huddersfield (BP)
	Report

Mortimer Park
Attendance: 357
Referee: Luke Haskins

20 September 2014
15:00

Harrogate	20 – 15	Caldy (BP)
	Report

Claro Road
Attendance: 230
Referee: Karl Kirkpatrick

20 September 2014
15:00

(BP) Hull Ionians	32 – 3	Otley
	Report

Brantingham Park
Attendance: 280
Referee: Will Halford

=== Round 4 ===
27 September 2014
14:30

(BP) Sedgley Park	39 – 20	Leicester Lions
	Report

Park Lane
Attendance: 241
Referee: Llyr Apgeraint-Roberts

27 September 2014
15:00

(BP) Ampthill	33 – 17	Birmingham & Solihull
	Report

Dillingham Park
Attendance: 265
Referee: Clare Hodnett

27 September 2014
15:00

Broadstreet	19 – 36	Hull Ionians (BP)
	Report

Ivor Preece Field
Attendance: 310
Referee: Dan Parrott

27 September 2014
15:00

(BP) Caldy	43 – 36	Luctonians (2BP)
	Report

Paton Field
Attendance: 199
Referee: Andrew Taylorson

27 September 2014
15:00

Huddersfield	10 – 7	Stourbridge (BP)
	Report

Lockwood Park
Attendance: 184
Referee: Karl Kirkpatrick

27 September 2014
15:00

Hull	20 – 20	Harrogate
	Report

Ferens Ground
Attendance: 150
Referee: Jack Makepeace

27 September 2014
15:00

Otley	23 – 5	Chester
	Report

Cross Green
Attendance: 264
Referee: Mick Harris

27 September 2014
15:00

(BP) Stockport	18 – 19	Preston Grasshoppers
	Report

The Memorial Ground
Attendance: 138
Referee: Chris Bennett

=== Round 5 ===
4 October 2014
14:00

(2BP) Birmingham & Solihull	27 – 29	Sedgley Park (BP)
	Report

Portway
Attendance: 206
Referee: Karl Kirkpatrick

4 October 2014
14:00

(BP) Leicester Lions	12 – 19	Huddersfield
	Report

Westleigh Park
Attendance: 117
Referee: Jack Makepeace

4 October 2014
14:30

Preston Grasshoppers	9 – 59	Ampthill (BP)
	Report

Lightfoot Green
Attendance: 281
Referee: Will Halford

4 October 2014
15:00

(BP) Chester	32 – 20	Broadstreet
	Report

Hare Lane
Attendance: 340
Referee: Brendan McGaffney

4 October 2014
15:00

Harrogate	26 – 25	Otley (BP)
	Report

Claro Road
Attendance: 750
Referee: Clare Hodnett

4 October 2014
15:00

(BP) Hull Ionians	52 – 15	Stockport
	Report

Brantingham Park
Attendance: 205
Referee: Ben Blain

4 October 2014
15:00

(2BP) Luctonians	20 – 23	Hull
	Report

Mortimer Park
Attendance: 330
Referee: Christopher Ridley

4 October 2014
15:00

(2BP) Stourbridge	29 – 30	Caldy
	Report

Bridgnorth Road
Attendance: 500
Referee: Chris Bennett

=== Round 6 ===
11 October 2014
14:00

Birmingham & Solihull	22 – 31	Leicester Lions (BP)
	Report

Portway
Attendance: 372
Referee: Luke Haskins

11 October 2014
14:30

(BP) Sedgley Park	33 – 31	Preston Grasshoppers (2BP)
	Report

Park Lane
Attendance: 298
Referee: Ben Blain

11 October 2014
15:00

Ampthill	25 – 15	Hull Ionians
	Report

Dillingham Park
Attendance: 421
Referee: Thomas Davies

11 October 2014
15:00

(BP) Broadstreet	24 – 28	Harrogate (BP)
	Report

Ivor Preece Field
Attendance: 285
Referee: Simon Walker

11 October 2014
15:00

(BP) Caldy	31 – 22	Huddersfield (BP)
	Report

Paton Field
Attendance: 236
Referee: Michael Harris

11 October 2014
15:00

Hull	18 – 27	Stourbridge (BP)
	Report

Ferens Ground
Attendance: 163
Referee: William Halford

11 October 2014
15:00

(BP) Otley	30 – 19	Luctonians
	Report

Cross Green
Attendance: 983
Referee: Wayne Falla

11 October 2014
15:00

Stockport	6 – 31	Chester (BP)
	Report

The Memorial Ground
Attendance: 150
Referee: Claire Hodnett

=== Round 7 ===
18 October 2014
14:00

(BP) Leicester Lions	33 – 19	Caldy
	Report

Westleigh Park
Attendance: 127
Referee: Simon Walker

18 October 2014
14:30

(BP) Preston Grasshoppers	19 – 20	Birmingham & Solihull
	Report

Lightfoot Green
Attendance: 286
Referee: Jack Makepeace

18 October 2014
15:00

Chester	15 – 13	Ampthill (BP)
	Report

Hare Lane
Attendance: 300
Referee: Karl Kirkpatrick

18 October 2014
15:00

(BP) Harrogate	59 – 14	Stockport
	Report

Claro Road
Attendance: 150
Referee: Matt Turvey

18 October 2014
15:00

(BP) Huddersfield	26 – 11	Hull
	Report

Lockwood Park
Attendance: 286
Referee: Michael Harris

18 October 2014
15:00

(BP) Hull Ionians	29 – 18	Sedgley Park
	Report

Brantingham Park
Attendance: 320
Referee: Christopher Bennett

18 October 2014
15:00

(BP) Luctonians	31 – 22	Broadstreet
	Report

Mortimer Park
Attendance: 345
Referee: Graham Dickens

18 October 2014
15:00

Stourbridge	23 – 37	Otley
	Report

Stourton Park
Attendance: 310
Referee: Brendan McGaffeney

=== Round 8 ===
25 October 2014
14:00

Birmingham & Solihull	20 – 29	Hull Ionians (BP)
	Report

Portway
Attendance: 202
Referee: Graham Dickens

25 October 2014
14:30

(BP) Preston Grasshoppers	45 – 14	Leicester Lions
	Report

Lightfoot Green
Attendance: 422
Referee: Karl Kirkpatrick

25 October 2014
14:30

Sedgley Park	13 – 23	Chester
	Report

Park Lane
Attendance: 150
Referee: Michael Harris

25 October 2014
15:00

(BP) Ampthill	53 – 7	Harrogate
	Report

Dillingham Park
Attendance: 205
Referee: Luke Haskins

25 October 2014
15:00

Broadstreet	33 – 10	Stourbridge
	Report

Ivor Preece Field
Attendance: 375
Referee: Chris Bennett

25 October 2014
15:00

(BP) Hull	44 – 15	Caldy
	Report

Ferens Ground
Attendance: 173
Referee: Luis Caviglia

25 October 2014
15:30

(BP) Otley	47 – 7	Huddersfield
	Report

Cross Green
Attendance: 427
Referee: Jack Makepeace

25 October 2014
15:30

Stockport	11 – 34	Luctonians (BP)
	Report

The Memorial Ground
Attendance: 85
Referee: Brendan McGaffney

=== Round 9 ===
1 November 2014
14:00

Harrogate	21 – 19	Sedgley Park (BP)
	Report

Claro Road
Attendance: 260
Referee: Andrew Taylorson

1 November 2014
14:00

(BP) Huddersfield	27 – 14	Broadstreet
	Report

Lockwood Park
Attendance: 226
Referee: Karl Kirkpatrick

1 November 2014
15:00

(BP) Hull Ionians	43 – 15	Preston Grasshoppers
	Report

Brantingham Park
Attendance: 171
Referee: Michael Harris

1 November 2014
14:15

(BP) Chester	30 – 18	Birmingham & Solihull
	Report

Hare Lane
Attendance: 500
Referee: Will Halford

1 November 2014
14:15

Luctonians	7 – 29	Ampthill (BP)
	Report

Mortimer Park
Attendance: 424
Referee: Paul Kimber

1 November 2014
15:00

(BP) Caldy	29 – 22	Otley (2 BP)
	Report

Paton Field
Attendance: 135
Referee: Christopher Bennett

1 November 2014
15:00

(BP) Leicester Lions	39 – 17	Hull
	Report

Westleigh Park
Attendance: 129
Referee: Christoper Ridley

1 November 2014
15:00

(BP) Stourbridge	62 – 7	Stockport
	Report

Stourton Park
Attendance: 308
Referee: Jack Makepeace

=== Round 10 ===
8 November 2014
14:00

(BP) Hull Ionians	38 – 0	Leicester Lions
	Report

Brantingham Park
Attendance: 185
Referee: Jack Makepeace

8 November 2014
14:00

(BP) Otley	30 – 0	Hull
	Report

Cross Green
Attendance: 219
Referee: David Clarkson

8 November 2014
14:15

(BP) Ampthill	44 – 12	Stourbridge
	Report

Dillingham Park
Attendance: 206
Referee: Clair Hodnett

8 November 2014
14:15

Caldy	14 – 12	Broadstreet (BP)
	Report

Paton Field
Attendance: 101
Referee: Michael Harris

8 November 2014
14:15

Stockport	27 – 18	Huddersfield
	Report

The Memorial Ground
Attendance: 150
Referee: Will Halford

8 November 2014
14:30

(BP) Sedgley Park	49 – 12	Luctonians
	Report

Park Lane
Attendance: 246
Referee: Brendan McGaffney

8 November 2014
15:00

Birmingham & Solihull	20 – 20	Harrogate
	Report

Portway
Attendance: 137
Referee: Matt Turvey

8 November 2014
15:00

Preston Grasshoppers	0 – 29	Chester (BP)
	Report

Lightfoot Green
Attendance: 277
Referee: Ben Blain

=== Round 11 ===
15 November 2014
14:00

(BP) Harrogate	27 – 9	Preston Grasshoppers
	Report

Claro Road
Attendance: 300
Referee: Ryan Smith

15 November 2014
14:00

(BP) Hull	11 – 15	Broadstreet
	Report

Ferens Ground
Attendance: 150
Referee: Phillip Davies

15 November 2014
14:00

Leicester Lions	14 – 8	Otley (BP)
	Report

Westleigh Park
Attendance: 119
Referee: Llyr Apgeraint-Roberts

15 November 2014
14:15

(BP) Caldy	40 – 30	Stockport
	Report

Paton Field
Attendance: 140
Referee: Karl Kirkpatrick

15 November 2014
14:15

Luctonians	21 – 39	Birmingham & Solihull (BP)
	Report

Mortimer Park
Attendance: 285
Referee: Jack Makepeace

15 November 2014
14:30

Stourbridge	17 – 17	Sedgley Park
	Report

Stourton Park
Attendance: 258
Referee: Luke Haskins

15 November 2014
15:00

Chester	14 – 35	Hull Ionians
	Report

Hare Lane
Attendance: 410
Referee: Chris Bennett

15 November 2014
15:00

Huddersfield	17 – 17	Ampthill
	Report

Lockwood Park
Attendance: 248
Referee: Michael Harris

=== Round 12 ===
22 November 2014
14:00

(BP) Birmingham & Solihull	23 – 25	Stourbridge
	Report

Portway
Attendance: 310
Referee: Christopher Bennett

22 November 2014
14:00

(BP) Hull Ionians	29 – 14	Harrogate
	Report

Brantingham Park
Attendance: 215
Referee: William Halford

22 November 2014
14:15

Ampthill	18 – 13	Caldy (BP)
	Report

Dillingham Park
Attendance: 153
Referee: Chris Ridley

22 November 2014
14:15

(BP) Broadstreet	37 – 27	Otley (BP)

The Ivor Preece Field
Attendance: 210
Referee: Carl Kirkpatrick

22 November 2014
14:15

(2 BP) Stockport	30 – 33	Hull (BP)
	Report

The Memorial Ground
Attendance: 150
Referee: Michael Harris

22 November 2014
14:30

(BP) Preston Grasshoppers	27 – 8	Luctonians
	Report

Lightfoot Green
Attendance: 339
Referee: Brendan Mcgaffney

22 November 2014
14:30

Sedgley Park	21 – 19	Huddersfield (BP)
	Report

Park Lane
Attendance: 100
Referee: Ben Blaine

22 November 2014
15:00

(BP) Chester	42 – 10	Leicester Lions
	Report

Hare Lane
Attendance: 410
Referee: Andrew Taylorson

=== Round 13 ===
29 November 2014
14:00

(BP) Harrogate	38 – 15	Chester
	Report

Claro Road
Attendance: 220
Referee: Sam Grove-White

29 November 2014
14:00

Hull	3 – 67	Ampthill (BP)
	Report

Ferens Ground
Attendance: 187
Referee: Ben Blaine

29 November 2014
14:00

Leicester Lions	13 – 21	Broadstreet
	Report

Westleigh Park
Attendance: 113
Referee: Christopher Bennett

29 November 2014
14:00

(BP) Otley	41 – 12	Stockport
	Report

Cross Green
Attendance: 208
Referee: Andrew Taylorson

29 November 2014
14:15

(BP) Caldy	40 – 35	Sedgley Park (2BP)
	Report

Paton Field
Attendance: 191
Referee: Llyr ApGeraint-Roberts

29 November 2014
14:15

Luctonians	17 – 36	Hull Ionians (BP)
	Report

Mortimer Park
Attendance: 320
Referee: Ian Bibey

29 November 2014
15:00

Huddersfield	14 – 22	Birmingham & Solihull
	Report

Lockwood Park
Attendance: 256
Referee: Will Halford

29 November 2014
15:00

(BP) Stourbridge	46 – 36	Preston Grasshoppers (BP)
	Report

Stourton Park
Attendance: 280
Referee: Claire Hodnett

=== Round 14 ===
6 December 2014
14:00

(BP) Birmingham & Solihull	20 – 24	Caldy
	Report

Portway
Attendance: 160
Referee: Claire Dodnett

6 December 2014
14:00

Harrogate	25 – 5	Leicester Lions
	Report

Claro Road
Attendance: 180
Referee: Ian Bibey

6 December 2014
14:00

(BP) Hull Ionians	50 – 13	Stourbridge
	Report

Brantingham Park
Attendance: 285
Referee: Jack Makepeace

6 December 2014
14:15

(BP) Ampthill	41 – 10	Otley
	Report

Dillingham Park
Attendance: 222
Referee: Philip Davies

6 December 2014
14:15

Stockport	3 – 39	Broadstreet (BP)
	Report

The Memorial Ground
Attendance: 150
Referee: Brendan McGaffney

6 December 2014
14:30

(2BP) Preston Grasshoppers	30 – 31	Huddersfield
	Report

Lightfoot Green
Attendance: 302
Referee: Karl Kirkpatrick

6 December 2014
14:30

(BP) Sedgley Park	47 – 15	Hull
	Report

Park Lane
Attendance: 227
Referee: William Hallford

6 December 2014
15:00

(BP) Chester	32 – 24	Luctonians
	Report

Hare Lane
Attendance: 150
Referee: Michael Harris

=== Round 15 ===
13 December 2014
14:00

Hull	12 – 22	Birmingham & Solihull
	Report

Ferens Ground
Attendance: 250
Referee: Andrew Rawson

13 December 2014
14:00

(BP) Leicester Lions	55 – 0	Stockport
	Report

Westleigh Park
Attendance: 111
Referee: Will Halford

13 December 2014
14:00

(BP) Otley	39 – 10	Sedgley Park
	Report

Cross Green
Attendance: 262
Referee: Christopher Bennett

13 December 2014
14:15

(BP) Broadstreet	33 – 52	Ampthill (BP)
	Report

Ivor Preece Field
Attendance: 231
Referee: Matthew Turvey

13 December 2014
14:15

Caldy	10 – 0	Preston Grasshoppers
	Report

Paton Field
Attendance: 263
Referee: Michael Harris

13 December 2014
14:15

(2BP) Luctonians	29 – 34	Harrogate
	Report

Mortimer Park
Attendance: 285
Referee: Dan Parrott

13 December 2014
15:00

Huddersfield	14 – 29	Hull Ionians (BP)
	Report

Lockwood Park
Attendance: 268
Referee: Brendan McGaffney

13 December 2014
15:00

(BP) Stourbridge	28 – 23	Chester (BP)
	Report

Stourton Park
Attendance: 270
Referee: Andrew Taylorson

=== Round 16 ===
20 December 2014
14:00

(BP) Harrogate	29 – 13	Huddersfield
	Report

Claro Road
Attendance: 380
Referee: Mick Harris

20 December 2014
14:00

(BP) Hull Ionians	29 – 6	Hull
	Report

Brantingham Park
Attendance: 491
Referee: Christophe Ridley

20 December 2014
14:00

Leicester Lions	30 – 19	Ampthill
	Report

Westleigh Park
Attendance: 137
Referee: Andrew Macneaney

20 December 2014
14:15

(BP) Broadstreet	41 – 21	Birmingham & Solihull
	Report

Ivor Preece Field
Attendance: 303
Referee: Llyr Geraint-Roberts

20 December 2014
14:15

Luctonians	26 – 14	Stourbridge
	Report

Mortimer Park
Attendance: 480
Referee: Matt Turvey

20 December 2014
14:30

(BP) Preston Grasshoppers	24 – 25	Otley (BP)
	Report

Lightfoot Green
Attendance: 502
Referee: Brendan McGaffney

20 December 2014
14:30

(BP) Sedgley Park	56 – 5	Stockport
	Report

Park Lane
Attendance: 500
Referee: Andrew Taylorson

20 December 2014
15:00

Chester	18 – 30	Caldy (BP)
	Report

Hare Lane
Attendance: 520
Referee: Chris Bennett

=== Round 17 ===
3 January 2014
14:00

(BP) Hull	27 – 22	Chester (BP)
	Report

Ferens Ground
Attendance: 198
Referee: Karl Kirkpatrick

3 January 2014
14:00

Otley	12 – 6	Hull Ionians (BP)
	Report

Cross Green
Attendance: 400
Referee: Jack Makepeace

3 January 2014
14:15

(BP) Ampthill	27 – 8	Sedgley Park
	Report

Dillingham Park
Attendance: 138
Referee: Christophe Ridley

3 January 2014
14:15

Broadstreet	23 – 14	Preston Grasshoppers
	Report

The Ivor Preece Field
Attendance: 247
Referee: Marcus Caton

3 January 2014
14:15

(BP) Caldy	12 – 19	Harrogate
	Report

Paton Field
Attendance: 220
Referee: Andrew Taylorson

3 January 2014
14:15

Stockport	27 – 27	Birmingham & Solihull
	Report

The Memorial Ground
Attendance: 100
Referee: Ben Blaine

3 January 2014
15:00

Huddersfield	19 – 12	Luctonians (BP)
	Report

Lockwood Park
Attendance: 262
Referee: Chris Bennett

3 January 2014
15:00

(BP) Stourbridge	20 – 22	Leicester Lions
	Report

Stourton Park
Attendance: 295
Referee: Llyr-Geraint Roberts

=== Round 18 ===
10 January 2014
14:00

Birmingham & Solihull	14 – 31	Ampthill (BP)
	Report

Portway
Attendance: 185
Referee: Andrew Taylorson

10 January 2014
14:00

(BP) Harrogate	28 – 10	Hull
	Report

Claro Road
Attendance: 200
Referee: Christopher Bennet

10 January 2014
14:00

(BP) Hull Ionians	26 – 10	Broadstreet
	Report

Brantingham Park
Attendance: 211
Referee: Karl Kirkpatrick

10 January 2014
14:00

Leicester Lions	17 – 28	Sedgley Park
	Report

Westleigh Park
Attendance: 79
Referee: Jack Makepeace

10 January 2014
14:15

(BP) Luctonians	24 – 10	Caldy
	Report

Mortimer Park
Attendance: 305
Referee: Luke Haskins

10 January 2014
14:30

(BP) Preston Grasshoppers	34 – 7	Stockport
	Report

Lightfoot Green
Attendance: 375
Referee: Michael Harris

10 January 2014
15:00

(BP) Chester	40 – 12	Otley
	Report

Hare Lane
Attendance: 362
Referee: Ben Blain

10 January 2014
15:00

Stourbridge	12 – 24	Huddersfield
	Report

Stourton Park
Attendance: 255
Referee: David Clarkson

=== Round 19 ===
17 January 2014
14:00

(BP) Hull	27 – 0	Luctonians
	Report

Ferens Ground
Attendance: 185
Referee: Andrew Taylorson

17 January 2014
14:00

Otley	10 – 20	Harrogate
	Report

Cross Green
Attendance: 578
Referee: Chris Bennett

17 January 2014
14:15

(BP) Ampthill	22 – 17	Preston Grasshoppers (BP)
	Report

Dillingham Park
Attendance: 162
Referee: Philip Davies

17 January 2014
14:15

(BP) Broadstreet	19 – 23	Chester
	Report

The Ivor Preece Field
Attendance: 213
Referee: Andrew MacNeaney

17 January 2014
14:15

Caldy	23 – 22	Stourbridge (BP)
	Report

Paton Field
Attendance: 276
Referee: Ben Blain

17 January 2014
14:15

Stockport	P – P	Hull Ionians

- Postponed due to frozen pitch. Game replayed on 28 February.

17 January 2014
14:30

(BP) Sedgley Park	17 – 22	Birmingham & Solihull
	Report

Park Lane
Attendance: 193
Referee: Andy Rawson

17 January 2014
15:00

(BP) Huddersfield	37 – 3	Leicester Lions
	Report

Lockwood Park
Attendance: 245
Referee: Luke Haskins

=== Round 20 ===
24 January 2015
14:00

Harrogate	P – P	Broadstreet

- Postponed due to bad weather. Game replayed on 28 February.

24 January 2015
14:00

Hull Ionians	7 – 6	Ampthill (BP)
	Report

Brantingham Park
Attendance: 453
Referee: Marcus Caton

24 January 2015
14:00

(BP) Leicester Lions	29 – 25	Birmingham & Solihull (BP)
	Report

Westleigh Park
Attendance: 121
Referee: Mike Adamson

24 January 2015
14:15

Luctonians	21 – 40	Otley (BP)
	Report

Mortimer Park
Attendance: 340
Referee: Powell Ettinger

24 January 2015
14:30

Preston Grasshoppers	21 – 6	Sedgley Park
	Report

Lightfoot Green
Attendance: 237
Referee: Chris Bennett

24 January 2015
15:00

(BP) Chester	41 – 5	Stockport
	Report

Hare Lane
Attendance: 200
Referee: Andrew Taylorson

24 January 2015
15:00

Huddersfield	24 – 17	Caldy (BP)
	Report

Lockwood Park
Attendance: 270
Referee: Karl Kirkpatrick

24 January 2015
15:00

(BP) Stourbridge	53 – 22	Hull (BP)
	Report

Stourton Park
Attendance: 325
Referee: Luke Haskins

=== Round 21 ===
31 January 2015
14:00

Birmingham & Solihull	10 – 24	Preston Grasshoppers (BP)
	Report

Portway
Attendance: 121
Referee: Claire Hodnett

31 January 2015
14:00

Hull	15 – 31	Huddersfield (BP)
	Report

Ferens Ground
Attendance: 123
Referee: Brendan McGaffney

31 January 2015
14:00

Otley	18 – 12	Stourbridge (BP)
	Report

Cross Green
Attendance: 219
Referee: Karl Kirkpatrick

31 January 2015
14:15

(BP) Ampthill	28 – 23	Chester (BP)
	Report

Dillingham Park
Attendance: 130
Referee: Daniel Parrott

31 January 2015
14:15

(BP) Broadstreet	32 – 6	Luctonians
	Report

The Ivor Preece Field
Attendance: 180
Referee: David Clarkson

31 January 2015
14:15

(BP) Caldy	41 – 21	Leicester Lions
	Report

Paton Field
Attendance: 196
Referee: Michael Harris

31 January 2015
14:15

Stockport	P – P	Harrogate

- Postponed due to snow. Game replayed on 28 March.

31 January 2015
14:30

(BP) Sedgley Park	38 – 5	Hull Ionians
	Report

Park Lane
Attendance: 267
Referee: Ben Blain

=== Round 22 ===
7 February 2015
14:00

Harrogate	9 – 26	Ampthill
	Report

Claro Road
Attendance: 400
Referee: Ben Blain

7 February 2015
14:00

(BP) Hull Ionians	50 – 17	Birmingham & Solihull
	Report

Brantingham Park
Attendance: 155
Referee: Michael Harris

7 February 2015
14:00

(BP) Leicester Lions	30 – 27	Preston Grasshoppers (2BP)
	Report

Westleigh Park
Attendance: 65
Referee: Calum Howard

7 February 2015
14:15

Caldy	15 – 13	Hull (BP)
	Report

Paton Field
Attendance: 193
Referee: Christopher Bennett

7 February 2015
14:15

(BP) Luctonians	31 – 20	Stockport
	Report

Mortimer Park
Attendance: 305
Referee: Brendan McGaffney

7 February 2015
15:00

(2BP) Chester	25 – 26	Sedgley Park (BP)
	Report

Hare Lane
Attendance: 227
Referee: Karl Kirkpatrick

7 February 2015
15:00

Huddersfield	13 – 6	Otley (BP)
	Report

Lockwood Park
Attendance: 374
Referee: Andrew Taylorson

7 February 2015
15:00

Stourbridge	23 – 17	Broadstreet (BP)
	Report

Stourton Park
Attendance: 220
Referee: Ben Davies

=== Round 23 ===
14 February 2015
14:00

(BP) Birmingham & Solihull	21 – 25	Chester
	Report

Portway
Attendance: 150
Referee: Christopher Bennett

14 February 2015
14:00

(BP) Hull	27 – 0	Leicester Lions
	Report

Ferens Ground
Attendance: 123
Referee: Karl Kirkpatrick

14 February 2015
14:00

(BP) Otley	26 – 26	Caldy (BP)
	Report

Cross Green
Attendance: 248
Referee: Ben Davis

14 February 2015
14:15

(BP) Ampthill	45 – 29	Luctonians (BP)
	Report

Dillingham Park
Attendance: 162
Referee: Jack Makepeace

14 February 2015
14:15

Broadstreet	25 – 21	Huddersfield (BP)
	Report

The Ivor Preece Field
Attendance: 143
Referee: Luis Caviglia

14 February 2015
14:15

Stockport	19 – 48	Stourbridge (BP)
	Report

The Memorial Ground
Attendance: 132
Referee: Matthew Turvey

14 February 2015
14:30

(BP) Preston Grasshoppers	24 – 29	Hull Ionians (BP)
	Report

Lightfoot Green
Attendance: 227
Referee: Ben Blain

14 February 2015
14:30

(BP) Sedgley Park	43 – 25	Harrogate
	Report

Park Lane
Attendance: 257
Referee: Michael Harris

=== Round 24 ===
21 February 2015
14:00

(2BP) Harrogate	34 – 35	Birmingham & Solihull (BP)
	Report

Claro Road
Attendance: 220
Referee: Luis Caviglia

21 February 2015
14:00

(BP) Hull	30 – 18	Otley
	Report

Ferens Ground
Attendance: 204
Referee: Christopher Bennett

21 February 2015
14:00

Leicester Lions	0 – 53	Hull Ionians (BP)
	Report

Westleigh Park
Attendance: 87
Referee: Mike Hudson

21 February 2015
14:15

(BP) Broadstreet	26 – 23	Caldy (2BP)
	Report

The Ivor Preece Field
Attendance: 148
Referee: Andrew Taylorson

21 February 2015
14:15

Luctonians	23 – 19	Sedgley Park (BP)
	Report

Mortimer Park
Attendance: 305
Referee: Karl Kirkpatrick

21 February 2015
15:00

Chester	16 – 11	Preston Grasshoppers (BP)
	Report

Hare Lane
Attendance: 438
Referee: Brendan McGaffney

21 February 2015
15:00

(BP) Huddersfield	26 – 11	Stockport
	Report

Lockwood Park
Attendance: 244
Referee: Matt Turvey

21 February 2015
15:00

Stourbridge	12 – 37	Ampthill (BP)
	Report

Stourton Park
Attendance: 340
Referee: Luke Haskins

=== Rounds 19 & 20 (rescheduled games) ===
28 February 2015
14:00

(BP) Harrogate	21 – 22	Broadstreet
	Report

Claro Road
Attendance: 180
Referee: Matt Turvey

28 February 2015
14:15

(BP) Stockport	19 – 24	Hull Ionians (BP)
	Report

The Memorial Ground
Attendance: 150
Referee: Michael Harris

=== Round 25 ===
7 March 2015
14:00

Birmingham & Solihull	22 – 41	Luctonians
	Report

Portway
Attendance: 249
Referee: Jack Makepeace

7 March 2015
14:15

(BP) Stockport	24 – 59	Caldy (BP)
	Report

The Memorial Ground
Attendance: 166
Referee: Ben Blain

7 March 2015
14:30

Preston Grasshoppers	21 – 12	Harrogate
	Report

Lightfoot Green
Attendance: 311
Referee: Karl Kirkpatrick

7 March 2015
14:30

(BP) Sedgley Park	43 – 23	Stourbridge
	Report

Park Lane
Attendance: 312
Referee: Brendan McGaffney

7 March 2015
15:00

(BP) Amphill	48 – 7	Huddersfield
	Report

Dillingham Park
Attendance: 228
Referee: Marcus Caton

7 March 2015
15:00

(BP) Broadstreet	34 – 12	Hull
	Report

The Ivor Preece Field
Attendance: 203
Referee: Michael Harris

7 March 2015
15:00

(BP) Hull Ionians	29 – 14	Chester
	Report

Brantingham Park
Attendance: 281
Referee: Christopher Bennett

7 March 2015
15:00

(BP) Otley	31 – 22	Leicester Lions (BP)
	Report

Cross Green
Attendance: 207
Referee: Ben Davies

=== Round 26 ===
14 March 2015
14:00

(BP) Leicester Lions	38 – 28	Chester (2BP)
	Report

Westleigh Park
Attendance: 54
Referee: Matt Turvey

14 March 2015
14:15

Luctonians	22 – 7	Preston Grasshoppers
	Report

Mortimer Park
Attendance: 410
Referee: Mike Hudson

14 March 2015
15:00

(2BP) Caldy	29 – 36	Ampthill (BP)
	Report

Paton Field
Attendance: 232
Referee: Michael Harris

14 March 2015
15:00

Harrogate	18 – 29	Hull Ionians (BP)
	Report

Claro Road
Attendance: 250
Referee: Karl Kirkpatrick

14 March 2015
15:00

Huddersfield	24 – 33	Sedgley Park (BP)
	Report

Lockwood Park
Attendance: 267
Referee: Chris Bennett

14 March 2015
15:00

Hull	27 – 21	Stockport (BP)
	Report

Ferens Ground
Attendance: 250
Referee: Karl Kirkpatrick

14 March 2015
15:00

(BP) Otley	20 – 22	Broadstreet
	Report

Cross Green
Attendance: 246
Referee: Andrew MacNeaney

14 March 2015
15:00

(BP) Stourbridge	36 – 33	Birmingham & Solihull (2BP)
	Report

Stourton Park
Attendance: 325
Referee: Luke Haskins

=== Round 21 (rescheduled game) ===
21 March 2015
14:15

(2BP) Stockport	24 – 29	Harrogate (BP)
	Report

The Memorial Ground
Attendance: 160
Referee: Chris Bennett

=== Round 27 ===
28 March 2015
14:00

(BP) Birmingham & Solihull	35 – 21	Huddersfield
	Report

Portway
Attendance: 185
Referee: Brendan McGaffney

28 March 2015
14:30

Preston Grasshoppers	18 – 28	Stourbridge (BP)
	Report

Lightfoot Green
Attendance: 327
Referee: Michael Harris

28 March 2015
14:30

Sedgley Park	15 – 10	Caldy (BP)
	Report

Park Lane
Attendance: 395
Referee: Andrew Taylorson

28 March 2015
15:00

(BP) Ampthill	45 – 14	Hull
	Report

Dillingham Park
Attendance: 155
Referee: David Proctor

28 March 2015
15:00

(BP) Broadstreet	31 – 15	Leicester Lions
	Report

The Ivor Preece Field
Attendance: 173
Referee: Neil Chivers

28 March 2015
15:00

(BP) Chester	17 – 22	Harrogate
	Report

Hare Lane
Attendance: 423
Referee: Andrew Rawson

28 March 2015
15:00

(BP) Hull Ionians	26 – 0	Luctonians
	Report

Brantingham Park
Attendance: 225
Referee: Llyr ApGeraint-Roberts

28 March 2015
15:00

Stockport	19 – 14	Otley (BP)
	Report

The Memorial Ground
Attendance: 150
Referee: Karl Kirkpatrick

=== Round 28 ===
11 April 2015
14:00

Leicester Lions	20 – 30	Huddersfield (BP)
	Report

Westleigh Park
Attendance: 120
Referee: Benjamin Davis

11 April 2015
15:00

(BP) Broadstreet	55 – 24	Stockport (BP)
	Report

The Ivor Preece Field
Attendance: 176
Referee: Adam Leal

11 April 2015
15:00

Caldy	19 – 14	Birmingham & Solihull (BP)
	Report

Paton Field
Attendance: 149
Referee: Karl Kirkpatrick

11 April 2015
15:00

Huddersfield	19 – 17	Preston Grasshoppers (BP)
	Report

Lockwood Park
Attendance: 266
Referee: Will Halford

11 April 2015
15:00

(BP) Hull	21 – 28	Sedgley Park (BP)
	Report

Ferens Ground
Attendance: 210
Referee: Andrew Taylorson

11 April 2015
15:00

Luctonians	10 – 10	Chester
	Report

Mortimer Park
Attendance: 518
Referee: Shane Lewis

11 April 2015
15:00

Otley	12 – 53	Ampthill (BP)
	Report

Cross Green
Attendance: 238
Referee: Llyr ApGeraint-Roberts

11 April 2015
15:00

Stourbridge	21 – 42	Hull Ionians (BP)
	Report

Stourton Park
Attendance: 310
Referee: Thomas Davis

=== Round 29 ===
18 April 2015
14:00

(2BP) Birmingham & Solihull	38 – 40	Hull (BP)
	Report

Portway
Attendance: 350
Referee: Luke Haskins

18 April 2015
14:30

Preston Grasshoppers	24 – 14	Caldy
	Report

Lightfoot Green
Attendance: 1,201
Referee: Michael Harris

18 April 2015
14:30

(BP) Sedgley Park	39 – 33	Otley (2BP)
	Report

Park Lane
Attendance: 250
Referee: Benjamin Davis

18 April 2015
15:00

(BP) Ampthill	36 – 26	Broadstreet
	Report

Dillingham Park
Attendance: 383
Referee: Veryan Boscawen

18 April 2015
15:00

(BP) Chester	31 – 28	Stourbridge (2BP)
	Report

Hare Lane
Attendance: 512
Referee: Chris Bennett

18 April 2015
15:00

(2BP) Harrogate	27 – 30	Luctonians (BP)
	Report

Claro Road
Attendance: 240
Referee: Will Halford

18 April 2015
15:00

(BP) Hull Ionians	45 – 3	Huddersfield
	Report

Brantingham Park
Attendance: 421
Referee: Andrew Taylorson

18 April 2015
15:00

Stockport	10 – 47	Leicester Lions (BP)
	Report

The Memorial Ground
Attendance: 150
Referee: Karl Kirkpatrick

=== Round 30 ===
25 April 2015
14:15

Stockport	17 – 59	Ampthill (BP)
	Report

The Memorial Ground
Attendance: 150
Referee: Mick Harris

25 April 2015
15:00

(BP) Broadstreet	35 – 26	Sedgley Park (BP)
	Report

The Ivor Preece Field
Attendance: 215
Referee: Karl Kirkpatrick

25 April 2015
15:00

Caldy	7 – 34	Hull Ionians (BP)
	Report

Paton Field
Attendance: 299
Referee: Andrew Taylorson

25 April 2015
15:00

Huddersfield	21 – 12	Chester
	Report

Lockwood Park
Attendance: 294
Referee: Ben Davis

25 April 2015
15:00

Hull	19 – 29	Preston Grasshoppers (BP)
	Report

Ferens Ground
Attendance: 210
Referee: Will Halford

25 April 2015
15:00

Luctonians	14 – 12	Leicester Lions (BP)
	Report

Mortimer Park
Attendance: 1,050
Referee: Luke Haskins

25 April 2015
15:00

Otley	15 – 33	Birmingham & Solihull (BP)
	Report

Cross Green
Attendance: 317
Referee: Brendan McGaffney

25 April 2015
15:00

(2BP) Stourbridge	28 – 29	Harrogate (BP)
	Report

Stourton Park
Attendance: 350
Referee: Neil Chivers

=== Promotion play-off ===
Each season, the runners-up in the National League 2 North and National League 2 South participate in a play-off for promotion to National Division 1. Ampthill, the runner-up in the North and, because they had a better record than the South runner-up, Bishop's Stortford hosted the match.

Club	Played	Won	Drawn	Lost	Points For	Points Against	Points Difference	Try Bonus	Loss Bonus	Points
Ampthill	30	26	1	3	1113	440	673	23	2	131
Bishop's Stortford	30	20	1	9	933	608	325	22	8	112

2 May 2015
15:00

Ampthill	19 – 10	Bishop's Stortford

Dillingham Park
Attendance: 1,253
Referee: Marcus Caton

== Average attendances ==
- Does not include play-off.

Club	Home Games	Total	Average	Highest	Lowest	% Capacity
Ampthill	15	3,221	215	421	130	7%
Birmingham & Solihull	15	3,256	217	372	121	
Broadstreet	15	3,412	227	375	143	15%
Caldy	15	3,227	215	397	101	5%
Chester	15	5,292	353	520	150	18%
Harrogate	15	4,260	284	750	150	6%
Huddersfield	15	3,868	258	374	178	17%
Hull	15	2,726	182	250	123	12%
Hull Ionians	15	4,138	276	491	155	18%
Leicester Lions	15	1,629	109	145	54	5%
Luctonians	15	6,059	404	1,050	285	16%
Otley	15	5,105	340	983	207	5%
Preston Grasshoppers	15	5,566	371	1,201	217	16%
Sedgley Park	15	3,895	260	500	100	9%
Stockport	15	2,181	145	200	85	29%
Stourbridge	15	4,946	330	600	220	9%

== Individual statistics ==
- Note that points scorers includes tries as well as conversions, penalties and drop goals. Appearance figures also include coming on as substitutes (unused substitutes not included).

=== Top points scorers ===
Rank	Player	Team	Appearances	Points
1	(England) Joe Tarrant	Ampthill	28	310
2	(England) Adam Canning	Birmingham & Solihull	30	297
3	(England) Lewis Allen	Preston Grasshoppers	30	273
4	(England) Steve Depledge	Otley	28	234
5	(England) Will Goodwin	Chester	20	186
6	(England) Ben Palmer	Broadstreet	19	176
7	(England) Isaac Green	Hull Ionians	27	175
8	(England) Stephen Collins	Sedgley Park	26	172
9	(England) Joel Hinchcliffe	Huddersfield	30	171
10	(England) Joe Rowntree	Harrogate	23	168

=== Top try scorers ===
Rank	Player	Team	Appearances	Tries
1	(England) Joe Bercis	Ampthill	28	31
2	(England) Harry Hudson	Otley	27	22
3	(England) Sam Wilson	Hull Ionians	21	19
4	(England) Darryl Dyer	Ampthill	22	18
4	(England) Joe Tarrant	Ampthill	28	18
4	(England) Andrew Riley	Sedgley Park	30	18
5	(England) Aquile Smith	Birmingham & Solihull	24	16
6	(England) Rob Young	Leicester Lions	29	15
6	(England) Matt Riley	Sedgley Park	30	15
7	(England) Craig Ross	Chester	23	14
7	(England) Callum Irvine	Harrogate	27	14
7	(England) David Ford	Chester	28	14
7	(England) Lewis Allen	Preston Grasshoppers	30	14

== Season records ==
=== Team ===
Largest home win – 59 pts

66 – 7 Ampthill at home to Leicester Lions on 13 September 2014

Largest away win – 75 pts

85 - 10 Sedgley Park away to Stockport on 13 September 2014

Most points scored – 85 pts

85 - 10 Sedgley Park away to Stockport on 13 September 2014

Most tries in a match – 13

Sedgley Park away to Stockport on 13 September 2014

Most conversions in a match – 10

Sedgley Park away to Stockport on 13 September 2014

Most penalties in a match – 9

Luctonians at home to Birmingham & Solihull on 15 November 2014

Most drop goals in a match – 1

N/A - multiple times

=== Player ===
Most points in a match – 36

(England) Caolan Ryan for Stourbridge at home to Preston Grasshoppers on 29 November 2014

Most tries in a match – 4 (x2)

(England) Callum McShane for Sedgley Park away to Stockport on 13 September 2014
(England) Joe Bercis for Ampthill away to Broadstreet on 13 December 2014

Most conversions in a match – 9

(England) Matt Riley for Sedgley Park away to Stockport on 13 September 2014

Most penalties in a match – 9

(England) Louis Silver for Luctonians at home to Birmingham & Solihull on 15 November 2015

Most drop goals in a match – 1

N/A - multiple players

=== Attendances ===
Highest – 1,201

Preston Grasshoppers at home against Caldy on 18 April 2015

Lowest – 54

Leicester Lions at home against Chester on 14 March 2015

Highest Average Attendance – 404

Luctonians

Lowest Average Attendance – 109

Leicester Lions

== See also ==
- English rugby union system
- Rugby union in England
