= 2015–16 National League 1 =

7th Season

- Countries: England
- Date: 5 September 2015 – 30 April 2016
- Champions: Richmond (2nd title)
- Runners-up: Hartpury College
- Relegated: Henley Hawks, Cinderford, Wharfedale
- Matches played: 240
- Attendance: 134,861 (average 562 per match)
- Highest attendance: 1,843 Plymouth Albion v Hartpury College on 23 April 2016
- Lowest attendance: 80 Blaydon v Fylde on 7 November 2015
- Tries scored: 1540 (average 6.4 per match)
- Top point scorer: (Wales) Gareth Thompson (Hartpury College) 283
- Top try scorer: (Lithuania) Jonas Mikalcius (Hartpury College) (England) Jason Smithson (Blaydon) 27

The 2015–16 National League 1, known for sponsorship reasons as the SSE National League 1 is the seventh season of the third tier of the English rugby union system, since the professionalised format of the second tier RFU Championship was introduced; and is the twenty-ninth season since league rugby began in 1987.

Richmond are the current champions and will play in the Greene King IPA Championship next season. Henley Hawks, Cinderford and Wharfedale are relegated. Henley and Cinderford to National League 2 South and Wharfedale to National League 2 North. Plymouth Albion went into administration on 8 April 2016 and an interim licence to run the club ended on 6 May 2016. Albion were deducted 30 points by the RFU and dropped from 5th place to 8th. The club have submitted a business case and await a decision by the RFU on 18 May. If the RFU reject the plan Albion could be relegated to the bottom of the league structure i.e. Devon League 2. If that happens Wharfedale will not be relegated and subsequently other teams down through the league structure could be reprieved.

== Structure ==
The league consists of sixteen teams with all the teams playing each other on a home and away basis to make a total of thirty matches each. There is one promotion place and three relegation places. The champions are promoted to the Greene King IPA Championship and the bottom three teams are relegated to either National League 2 North or National League 2 South depending on the geographical location of the team.

== Participating teams and locations ==
National 1 teams in England
Greater London National League 1 clubs

Twelve of the sixteen teams participated in last season's competition. The 2014–15 champions Ealing Trailfinders are promoted to the 2015–16 RFU Championship and are replaced by Plymouth Albion who were relegated from the 2014–15 RFU Championship after spending thirteen seasons in the league above. The three teams relegated last season, are Old Albanian, (to the 2015–16 National League 2 South), and Macclesfield and Tynedale, (both to the 2015–16 National League 2 North). The promoted teams are Henley Hawks and Hull Ionians champions of the 2014–15 National League 2 South and 2014–15 National League 2 North respectively, and Ampthill who won the promotion play-off against Bishop's Stortford.

Team	Ground	Capacity	City/Area	Previous season
Ampthill	Dillingham Park	3,000	Ampthill, Bedfordshire	Promoted from the 2014–15 National League 2 North (playoffs)
Blackheath	Rectory Field	3,500 (500 seats)	Blackheath, London	6th
Blaydon	Crow Trees	2,000 (400 seats)	Swalwell, Tyne and Wear	8th
Cinderford	Dockham Road	2,500	Cinderford, Gloucestershire	13th
Coventry	Butts Park Arena	4,000 (3,000 seats)	Coventry, West Midlands	3rd
Darlington Mowden Park	Northern Echo Arena	25,000	Darlington, County Durham	9th
Esher	Molesey Road	3,000 (1,200 seats)	Hersham, Surrey	10th
Fylde	Woodlands Memorial Ground	7,500 (500 seats)	Lytham St. Annes, Lancashire	4th
Hartpury College	College Stadium	2,000	Hartpury, Gloucestershire	5th
Henley Hawks	Dry Leas	4,000	Henley-on-Thames, Oxfordshire	Promoted from the 2014–15 National League 2 South (champions)
Hull Ionians	Brantingham Park	1,500 (240 seats)	Brantingham, East Riding of Yorkshire	Promoted from the 2014–15 National League 2 North (champions)
Loughborough Students	Loughborough University Stadium	3,000	Loughborough, Leicestershire	12th
Plymouth Albion	The Brickfields	8,500	Plymouth, Devon	Relegated from the 2014–15 RFU Championship
Richmond	Athletic Ground, Richmond	4,500 (1,000 seats)	Richmond, London	7th
Rosslyn Park	The Rock	2,000 (630 seats)	Roehampton, London	2nd
Wharfedale	The Avenue	2,000	Threshfield, North Yorkshire	11th

== League table ==
2015–16 National League 1 table
Pos	Team	Pld	W	D	L	PF	PA	PD	TB	LB	Pts	Qualification
1	Richmond (C)	30	23	2	5	854	534	+320	16	4	116	Promoted
2	Hartpury College	30	21	0	9	966	558	+408	15	5	104	
3	Blackheath	30	21	2	7	794	488	+306	9	6	103	
4	Ampthill	30	20	2	8	746	620	+126	14	5	103	
5	Rosslyn Park	30	20	0	10	745	578	+167	12	3	95	
6	Darlington Mowden Park	30	19	0	11	766	640	+126	11	4	91	
7	Esher	30	17	0	13	801	603	+198	14	6	88	
8	Plymouth Albion	30	22	0	8	733	647	+86	11	3	72 (Note: Plymouth Albion were deducted 30 points for going into administration on 8 April 2016)	
9	Coventry	30	13	2	15	710	653	+57	9	6	71	
10	Fylde	30	11	1	18	736	804	−68	11	10	67	
11	Blaydon	30	10	0	20	565	772	−207	10	7	57	
12	Hull Ionians	30	9	0	21	645	872	−227	10	11	57	
13	Loughborough Students	30	9	0	21	680	774	−94	10	9	55	
14	Wharfedale (R)	30	6	1	23	592	869	−277	10	7	43	Relegated
15	Cinderford (R)	30	7	1	22	545	969	−424	7	4	41	Relegated
16	Henley Hawks (R)	30	6	1	23	478	975	−497	5	3	34	Relegated

Updated to match(es) played on 30 April 2016. Source: "National League 1". NCA Rugby.
Rules for classification: Points system: 4 points for a win; 2 points for a draw; 1 point if a team loses by seven points or less (losing bonus); 1 point if the team scores four or more tries in a match (try bonus)
- If teams are level at any stage, tiebreakers are applied in the following order:
1. Number of matches won
2. Difference between points for and against
3. Total number of points for
4. Aggregate number of points scored in matches between tied teams
5. Number of matches won excluding the first match, then the second and so on until the tie is settled
  (C) Champion; (R) Relegated
  Notes:

== Fixtures ==
=== Round 1 ===
5 September 2015
14:30

(BP) Blaydon	29 – 16	Blackheath

Crow Trees
Attendance: 152
Referee: Ben Blain

5 September 2015
15:00

(BP) Cinderford	24 – 37	Darlington Mowden Park (BP)

Dockham Road
Attendance: 305
Referee: Fergus Kirby

5 September 2015
15:00

(BP) Coventry	40 – 14	Wharfedale

Butts Park Arena
Attendance: 1,259
Referee: Robert Warburton

5 September 2015
15:00

Esher	16 – 27	Ampthill (BP)

Molesey Road
Attendance: 285
Referee: James Sullivan

5 September 2015
15:00

(BP) Fylde	30 – 28	Loughborough Students (BP)

Woodlands Memorial Ground
Attendance: 575
Referee: Jack Makepeace

5 September 2015
15:00

(BP) Hull Ionians	37 – 32	Hartpury College (2BP)

Brantingham Park
Attendance: 316
Referee: Gareth Holsgrove

5 September 2015
15:00

Plymouth Albion	33 – 20	Richmond

Brickfields
Attendance: 967
Referee: Daniel Parrott

5 September 2015
15:00

(BP) Rosslyn Park	62 – 12	Henley Hawks

The Rock
Attendance: 660
Referee: Philip Davies

=== Round 2 ===
12 September 2015
14:00

Loughborough Students	12 – 48	Coventry (BP)

Loughborough University Stadium
Attendance: 664
Referee: Ben Blain

12 September 2015
14:30

(BP) Ampthill	41 – 12	Blaydon

Dillingham Park
Attendance: 317
Referee: James Clarke

12 September 2015
14:30

(BP) Hartpury College	39 – 12	Fylde

College Stadium
Attendance: 349
Referee: Fergus Kirby

12 September 2015
15:00

(BP) Blackheath	44 – 10	Cinderford

Rectory Field
Attendance: 627
Referee: Gareth Holsgrove

12 September 2015
15:00

(2BP) Darlington Mowden Park	28 – 30	Henley Hawks (BP)

Northern Echo Arena
Attendance: 741
Referee: Jamie Leahy

12 September 2015
15:00

(BP) Plymouth Albion	15 – 16	Rosslyn Park

Brickfields
Attendance: 1,243
Referee: Shane Lewis

12 September 2015
15:00

Richmond	23 – 16	Hull Ionians (BP)

Athletic Ground
Attendance: 353
Referee: Christophe Ridley

12 September 2015
15:00

(BP) Wharfedale	26 – 46	Esher (BP)

The Avenue
Attendance: 475
Referee: Jack Makepeace

=== Round 3 ===
19 September 2015
14:30

Blaydon	13 – 43	Wharfedale (BP)

Crow Trees
Attendance: 220
Referee: Jamie Leahy

19 September 2015
15:00

(BP) Cinderford	25 – 27	Ampthill (BP)

Dockham Road
Attendance: 270
Referee: Matthew O'Grady

19 September 2015
15:00

(BP) Coventry	21 – 23	Hartpury College

Butts Park Arena
Attendance: 1,053
Referee: Phillip Davies

19 September 2015
15:00

(BP) Esher	30 – 16	Loughborough Students

Molesey Road
Attendance: 310
Referee: Robert Warburton

19 September 2015
15:00

(BP) Fylde	27 – 29	Richmond

Woodlands Memorial Ground
Attendance: 467
Referee: Steve Lee

19 September 2015
15:00

Henley Hawks	13 – 47	Blackheath (BP)

Dry Leas
Attendance: 410
Referee: Veryan Boscawen

19 September 2015
15:00

Hull Ionians	25 – 21	Plymouth Albion (BP)

Brantingham Road
Attendance: 257
Referee: Jack Makepeace

19 September 2015
15:00

Rosslyn Park	26 – 17	Darlington Mowden Park

The Rock
Attendance: 570
Referee: James Clarke

=== Round 4 ===
26 September 2015
14:00

(BP) Loughborough Students	35 – 7	Blaydon

Loughborough University Stadium
Attendance: 554
Referee: Robert Warburton

26 September 2015
14:30

Hartpury College	30 – 13	Esher

College Stadium
Attendance: 337
Referee: Dan Parrott

26 September 2015
15:00

Ampthill	14 – 14	Henley Hawks

Dillingham Park
Attendance: 395
Referee: Jack Makepeace

26 September 2015
15:00

Blackheath	23 – 7	Darlington Mowden Park

Rectory Field
Attendance: 521
Referee: Fergus Kirby

26 September 2015
15:00

(BP) Hull Ionians	26 – 44	Rosslyn Park (BP)

Brantingham Park
Attendance: 201
Referee: Jamie Leahy

26 September 2015
15:00

Plymouth Albion	31 – 24	Fylde (BP)

Brickfields
Attendance: 981
Referee: Shane Lewis

26 September 2015
15:00

(BP) Richmond	31 – 7	Coventry

Athletic Ground
Attendance: 423
Referee: Veryan Boscawen

26 September 2015
15:00

(2BP) Wharfedale	27 – 33	Cinderford (BP)

The Avenue
Attendance: 451
Referee: Christopher Ridley

=== Round 5 ===
3 October 2015
14:30

(BP) Blaydon	22 – 28	Hartpury College

Crow Trees
Attendance: 155
Referee: James Leahy

3 October 2015
15:00

(BP) Amptill	32 – 20	Darlington Mowden Park

Dillington Park
Attendance: 195
Referee: Dan Parrott

3 October 2015
15:00

(BP) Cinderford	9 – 16	Loughborough Students

Dockham Road
Attendance: 265
Referee: James Sullivan

3 October 2015
15:00

Coventry	26 – 19	Plymouth Albion (BP)

Butts Park Arena
Attendance: 1,168
Referee: Philip Davies

3 October 2015
15:00

(BP) Esher	41 – 34	Richmond (2BP)

Molesey Road
Attendance: 436
Referee: Gareth Holsgrove

3 October 2015
15:00

(2BP) Fylde	35 – 38	Hull Ionions (BP)

Woodlands Memorial Ground
Attendance: 493
Referee: Ben Blain

3 October 2015
15:00

(BP) Henley Hawks	39 – 13	Wharfedale

Dry Leas
Attendance: 348
Referee: James Clarke

3 October 2015
15:00

Rosslyn Park	18 – 31	Blackheath

The Rock
Attendance: 603
Referee: Ian Tempest

=== Round 6 ===
10 October 2015
14:00

(BP) Loughborough Students	21 – 24	Henley Hawks

Loughborough University Stadium
Attendance: 475
Referee: Jamie Leahy

10 October 2015
14:30

Hartpury College	27 – 17	Cinderford

College Stadium
Attendance: 576
Referee: Gareth Holsgrove

10 October 2015
14:45

Richmond	19 – 10	Blaydon

Athletic Ground
Attendance: 279
Referee: Phillip Davies

10 October 2015
15:00

(BP) Ampthill	10 – 15	Blackheath

Dillingham Park
Attendance: 398
Referee: Shane Lewis

10 October 2015
15:00

(BP) Fylde	36 – 20	Rosslyn Park

Woodlands Memorial Ground
Attendance: 458
Referee: Jack Makepeace

10 October 2015
15:00

(BP) Hull Ionians	16 – 21	Coventry

Brantingham Park
Attendance: 274
Referee: John Meredith

10 October 2015
15:00

Plymouth Albion	12 – 38	Esher (BP)

Brickfields
Attendance: 1,254
Referee: Michael Hudson

10 October 2015
15:00

(BP) Wharfedale	45 – 21	Darlington Mowden Park

The Avenue
Attendance: 526
Referee: Ben Blain

=== Round 7 ===
17 October 2015
14:00

(BP) Esher	40 – 14	Hull Ionians

Molesey Road
Attendance: 304
Referee: Jamie Leahy

17 October 2015
14:00

Henley Hawks	0 – 46	Hartpury College (BP)

Dry Leas
Attendance: 325
Referee: Jack Makepeace

17 October 2015
14:15

Coventry	24 – 36	Fylde (BP)

Butt Parks Arena
Attendance: 1,173
Referee: Christopher Ridley

17 October 2015
14:30

(2BP) Blaydon	33 – 38	Plymouth Albion (BP)

Crow Trees
Attendance: 165
Referee: Ben Blain

17 October 2015
15:00

Blackheath	27 – 24	Wharfedale (BP)

Rectory Field
Attendance: 423
Referee: Dan Parrott

17 October 2015
15:00

Cinderford	20 – 43	Richmond (BP)

Dockham Road
Attendance: 266
Referee: Veryan Boscawen

17 October 2015
15:00

(BP) Darlington Mowden Park	39 – 16	Loughborough Students

Northern Echo Arena
Attendance: 1,056
Referee: Thomas Davis

17 October 2015
15:00

Rosslyn Park	17 – 10	Ampthill (BP)

The Rock
Attendance: 350
Referee: Fergus Kirby

=== Round 8 ===
24 October 2015
14:00

Fylde	21 – 31	Esher (BP)

Woodlands Memorial Ground
Attendance: 489
Referee: Shane Lewis

24 October 2015
14:00

Loughborough Students	15 – 23	Blackheath

Loughborough University Stadium
Attendance: 226
Referee: Veryan Boscawen

24 October 2015
14:15

Wharfedale	12 – 29	Ampthill (BP)

The Avenue
Attendance: 426
Referee: Gareth Holsgrove

24 October 2015
14:30

(BP) Hartpury College	50 – 7	Darlington Mowden Park

College Stadium
Attendance: 331
Referee: Ben Blain

24 October 2015
15:00

(BP) Coventry	13 – 20	Rosslyn Park

Butts Park Arena
Attendance: 1,025
Referee: Llyr ApGeraint Roberts

24 October 2015
15:00

(BP) Hull Ionians	28 – 3	Blaydon

Brantingham Park
Attendance: 174
Referee: Christophe Ridley

24 October 2015
15:00

(BP) Plymouth Albion	27 – 15	Cinderford

Brickfields
Attendance: 894
Referee: Robert Warburton

24 October 2015
15:00

(BP) Richmond	54 – 5	Henley Hawks

Athletic Ground
Attendance: 451
Referee: James Clarke

=== Round 9 ===
7 November 2015
14:00

(BP) Blaydon	34 – 17	Fylde

Crow Trees
Attendance: 80
Referee: Jack Makepeace

7 November 2015
14:15

Ampthill	21 – 19	Loughborough Students (BP)

Dillington Park
Attendance: 310
Referee: Christopher Ridley

7 November 2015
15:00

Blackheath	13 – 12	Hartpury College (BP)

Rectory Field
Attendance: 562
Referee: Greg MacDonald

7 November 2015
15:00

(BP) Cinderford	32 – 19	Hull Ionians

Dockham Road
Attendance: 187
Referee: Andrew Jackson

7 November 2015
15:00

(BP) Darlington Mowden Park	21 – 22	Richmond (BP)

Northern Echo Arena
Attendance: 1,013
Referee: Michael Hudson

7 November 2015
15:00

(BP) Esher	46 – 5	Coventry

Molesey Road
Attendance: 472
Referee: Thomas Davis

7 November 2015
15:00

Henley Hawks	3 – 36	Plymouth Albion (BP)

Dry Leas
Attendance: 376
Referee: Phillip Davies

7 November 2015
15:00

(BP) Rosslyn Park	26 – 15	Wharfedale

The Rock
Attendance: 462
Referee: Veryan Boscawen

=== Round 10 ===
14 November 2015
14:00

(BP) Hull Ionians	32 – 5	Henley Hawks

Brantingham Park
Attendance: 232
Referee: Jamie Leahy

14 November 2015
14:00

(BP) Loughborough Students	30 – 8	Wharfedale

Loughborough University Stadium
Attendance: 263

14 November 2015
14:30

(BP) Hartpury College	37 – 10	Ampthill

College Stadium
Attendance: 200
Referee: Llyr ApGeraint Roberts

14 November 2015
15:00

(BP) Coventry	38 – 0	Blaydon

Butts Park Arena
Attendance: 1,047
Referee: Jack Makepeace

14 November 2015
15:00

(BP) Esher	17 – 20	Rosslyn Park

Molesey Road
Attendance: 715
Referee: Gareth Holsgrove

14 November 2015
15:00

(BP) Fylde	45 – 7	Cinderford

Woodlands Memorial Ground
Attendance: 466
Referee: Ben Blain

14 November 2015
15:00

Plymouth Albion	15 – 25	Darlington Mowden Park

Brickfields
Attendance: 1,065
Referee: Veryan Boscawen

14 November 2015
15:00

Richmond	23 – 20	Blackheath (BP)

Athletic Ground
Attendance: 879
Referee: James Sullivan

=== Round 11 ===
21 November 2015
14:00

Blaydon	13 – 8	Esher (BP)

Crow Trees
Attendance: 150
Referee: John Brennan

21 November 2015
14:00

Wharfedale	0 – 45	Hartpury College (BP)

The Avenue
Attendance: 325
Referee: James Sullivan

21 November 2015
14:15

Ampthill	10 – 46	Richmond

Dillington Park
Attendance: 315
Referee: Keith Allen

21 November 2015
15:00

(BP) Blackheath	34 – 3	Plymouth Albion

Rectory Field
Attendance: 610
Referee: James Clarke

21 November 2015
15:00

Cinderford	13 – 38	Coventry (BP)

Dockham Road
Attendance: 384
Referee: Shane Lewis

21 November 2015
15:00

(BP) Darlington Mowden Park	43 – 11	Hull Ionians

Northern Echo Arena
Attendance: 962
Referee: Llyr ApGeraint Roberts

21 November 2015
15:00

(BP) Henley Hawks	18 – 23	Fylde

Dry Leas
Attendance: 374
Referee: Daniel Parrott

21 November 2015
15:00

Rosslyn Park	10 – 32	Loughborough Students (BP)

The Rock
Attendance: 473
Referee: Veryan Boscawen

=== Round 12 ===
28 November 2015
14:00

Blaydon	13 – 0	Rosslyn Park

Crow Trees
Attendance: 180
Referee: Llyr ApGeraint Roberts

28 November 2015
14:00

(BP) Hull Ionians	20 – 26	Blackheath (BP)

Brantingham Park
Attendance: 301
Referee: Dan Parrott

28 November 2015
14:30

Hartpury College	13 – 8	Loughborough College (BP)

College Stadium
Attendance: 276
Referee: Phillip Davies

28 November 2015
15:00

(BP) Coventry	29 – 15	Henley Hawks

Butts Park Arena
Attendance: 1,012
Referee: Ben Blain

28 November 2015
15:00

(BP) Esher	43 – 3	Cinderford

Molesey Road
Attendance: 351
Referee: Robert Warburton

28 November 2015
15:00

(BP) Fylde	17 – 21	Darlington Mowden Park

Woodlands Memorial Park
Attendance: 438
Referee: Fergus Kirby

28 November 2015
15:00

Plymouth Albion	18 – 13	Ampthill (BP)

Brickfields
Attendance: 927
Referee: Gareth Holsgrove

28 November 2015
15:00

(BP) Richmond	55 – 12	Wharfedale

Athletic Ground
Attendance: 391
Referee: Christophe Ridley

=== Round 13 ===
5 December 2015
14:00

Loughborough Students	17 – 31	Richmond (BP)

Loughborough University Stadium
Attendance: 379
Referee: Shane Lewis

5 December 2015
14:00

(BP) Wharfedale	9 – 12	Plymouth Albion

The Avenue
Attendance: 379
Referee: Jamie Leahy

5 December 2015
14:15

Ampthill	22 – 21	Hull Ionians (BP)

Dillingham Park
Attendance: 215
Referee: Jack Makepeace

5 December 2015
14:30

Cinderford	12 – 10	Blaydon (BP)

Dockham Road
Attendance: 262
Referee: Christophe Ridley

5 December 2015
15:00

Blackheath	34 – 34	Fylde (BP)

Rectory Field
Attendance: 481
Referee: Ben Blain

5 December 2015
15:00

(BP) Darlington Mowden Park	29 – 21	Coventry

Northern Echo Arena
Attendance: 900
Referee: Michael Hudson

5 December 2015
15:00

Henley Hawks	5 – 39	Esher (BP)

Dry Leas
Attendance: 375
Referee: Veryan Boscawen

5 December 2015
15:00

(BP) Rosslyn Park	26 – 18	Hartpury College

The Rock
Attendance: 301
Referee: John Meredith

=== Round 14 ===
12 December 2015
14:00

(BP) Hull Ionians	15 – 16	Wharfedale

Brantingham Park
Attendance: 405
Referee: Veryan Boscawen

12 December 2015
14:45

Blaydon	P – P	Henley Hawks

- Postponed due to bad weather and waterlogged pitch. Game rescheduled to 27 February 2016.

12 December 2015
15:00

(BP) Cinderford	17 – 20	Rosslyn Park

Dockham Road
Attendance: 243
Referee: Darren Gamage

12 December 2015
15:00

Coventry	16 – 24	Blackheath

Butts Park
Attendance: 1,298
Referee: James Clarke

12 December 2015
15:00

Esher	14 – 22	Darlington Mowden Park

Molesey Road
Attendance: 420
Referee: Simon Harding

12 December 2015
15:00

Fylde	P – P	Ampthill

- Postponed due to bad weather and waterlogged pitch. Game rescheduled to 27 February 2016.

12 December 2015
15:00

(BP) Plymouth Albion	34 – 27	Loughborough Students (2BP)

Brickfields
Attendance: 961
Referee: Dave Parrot

12 December 2015
15:00

(BP) Richmond	21 – 27	Hartpury College (BP)

Athletic Ground
Attendance: 835
Referee: Gareth Holsgrove

=== Round 15 ===
19 December 2015
14:00

Loughborough Students	28 – 24	Hull Ionians (BP)

Loughborough University Stadium
Attendance: 243
Referee: Thomas Davis

19 December 2015
14:00

(2 BP) Wharfedale	28 – 32	Fylde (BP)

The Avenue
Attendance: 581
Referee: John Meredith

19 December 2015
14:15

(BP) Ampthill	31 – 25	Coventry (2 BP)

Dillingham Park
Attendance: 585
Referee: Andrew Jackson

19 December 2015
14:30

(BP) Hartpury College	17 – 22	Plymouth Albion

College stadium
Attendance: 370
Referee: Shane Lewis

19 December 2015
15:00

Blackheath	28 – 21	Esher (BP)

Rectory Field
Attendance: 841
Referee: Matthew O'Grady

19 December 2015
15:00

(BP) Darlington Mowden Park	51 – 11	Blaydon

Northern Echo Arena
Attendance: 1,175
Referee: James Clarke

19 December 2015
15:00

(BP) Henley Hawks	27 – 13	Cinderford

Dry Leas
Attendance: 485
Referee: Philip Davies

19 December 2015
15:00

Rosslyn Park	24 – 33	Richmond

The Rock
Attendance: 1,604
Referee: Rob Warburton

=== Round 16 ===
2 January 2016
14:00

(BP) Blaydon	12 – 19	Ampthill

Crow Trees
Attendance: 210
Referee: Ben Blain

2 January 2016
14:00

Hull Ionians	13 – 37	Richmond (BP)

Brantingham Park
Attendance: 512
Referee: James Clarke

2 January 2016
15:00

Cinderford	5 – 37	Blackheath (BP)

Dockham Road
Attendance: 227
Referee: Thomas Davis

2 January 2016
15:00

(BP) Coventry	37 – 12	Loughborough Students

Butts Park Arena
Attendance: 1,372
Referee: Jamie Leahy

2 January 2016
15:00

Esher	25 – 10	Wharfedale

Molesey Road
Attendance: 373
Referee: Gareth Holsgrove

2 January 2016
15:00

(BP) Fylde	17 – 18	Hartpury College

Woodlands Memorial Ground
Attendance: 550
Referee: Llyr ApGeraint Roberts

2 January 2016
15:00

Henley Hawks	11 – 19	Darlington Mowden Park

Dry Leas
Attendance: 325
Referee: Philip Davies

2 January 2016
15:00

(BP) Rosslyn Park	24 – 26	Plymouth Albion

The Rock
Attendance: 520
Referee: James Sullivan

=== Round 17 ===
9 January 2016
14:00

Loughborough Students	17 – 32	Esher (BP)

Loughborough University Stadium
Attendance: 306
Referee: Keith Allen

9 January 2016
14:00

Richmond	22 – 21	Fylde (BP)

Athletic Ground
Attendance: 864
Referee: Michael Hudson

9 January 2016
14:00

Wharfedale	13 – 27	Blaydon

The Avenue
Attendance: 570
Referee: Jack Makepeace

9 January 2016
14:15

(BP) Ampthill	47 – 14	Cinderford

Dillingham Park
Attendance: 185
Referee: Steve Lee

9 January 2016
14:30

Hartpury College	26 – 17	Coventry

College Stadium
Attendance: 475
Referee: James Sullivan

9 January 2016
15:00

Blackheath	23 – 12	Henley Hawks

Rectory Field
Attendance: 821
Referee: Veryan Boscawen

9 January 2016
15:00

Darlington Mowden Park	17 – 10	Rosslyn Park (BP)

Northern Echo Arena
Attendance: 1,111
Referee: Ben Blain

9 January 2016
15:00

Plymouth Albion	7 – 17	Hull Ionians

Brickfields
Attendance: 1,083
Referee: Shane Lewis

=== Round 18 ===
16 January 2016
14:00

Blaydon	P – P	Loughborough Students

Crow Trees

- Game rescheduled to 12 March 2016

16 January 2016
15:00

Cinderford	26 – 26	Wharfedale

Dockham Road
Attendance: 217
Referee: James Sullivan

16 January 2016
15:00

Coventry	21 – 21	Richmond

Butts Park Arena
Attendance: 1,229
Referee: Gareth Holsgrove

16 January 2016
15:00

Darlington Mowden Park	P – P	Blackheath

Northern Echo Arena

- Game rescheduled to 27 February 2016

16 January 2016
15:00

Esher	24 – 14	Hartpury College

Molesey Road
Attendance: 463
Referee: Robert Warburton

16 January 2016
15:00

Fylde	26 – 38	Plymouth Albion (BP)

Woodlands Memorial Ground
Attendance: 673
Referee: Greg MacDonald

16 January 2016
15:00

Henley Hawks	16 – 38	Ampthill (BP)

Dry Leas
Attendance: 415
Referee: Shane Lewis

16 January 2016
15:00

(BP) Rosslyn Park	49 – 0	Hull Ionians

The Rock
Attendance: 430
Referee: James Clarke

=== Round 19 ===
23 January 2016
14:00

(BP) Hull Ionians	26 – 36	Fylde (BP)

Brantingham Park
Attendance: 277
Referee: Jamie Leahy

23 January 2016
14:00

(BP) Loughborough Students	43 – 12	Cinderford

Loughborough University Stadium
Attendance: 326
Referee: Rob Warburton

23 January 2016
14:00

Wharfedale	26 – 17	Henley Hawks

The Avenue
Attendance: 530
Referee: Lyr ApGeraint-Roberts

23 January 2016
14:30

(BP) Hartpury College	71 – 12	Blaydon

College Stadium
Attendance: 315
Referee: James Clarke

23 January 2016
15:00

Blackheath	20 – 7	Rosslyn Park

Rectory Field
Attendance: 1,127
Referee: Andrew Jackson

23 January 2016
15:00

(BP) Darlington Mowden Park	45 – 29	Ampthill (BP)

Northern Echo Arena
Attendance: 1,102
Referee: Matt Turvey

23 January 2016
15:00

(BP) Plymouth Albion	29 – 18	Coventry

Brickfields
Attendance: 1,083
Referee: Darren Gamage

23 January 2016
15:00

(BP) Richmond	33 – 19	Esher

Athletic Ground
Attendance: 1,159
Referee: Veryan Boscawen

=== Round 20 ===
30 January 2016
14:30

(BP) Blaydon	3 – 10	Richmond

Crow Trees
Attendance: 320
Referee: Jamie Leahy

30 January 2016
15:00

Blackheath	21 – 15	Ampthill (BP)

Rectory Field
Attendance: 813
Referee: Gareth Holsgrove

30 January 2016
15:00

Cinderford	7 – 38	Hartpury College (BP)

Dockham Road
Attendance: 435
Referee: Shane Lewis

30 January 2016
15:00

(BP) Coventry	26 – 19	Hull Ionians (BP)

Butts Park Arena
Attendance: 1,117
Referee: Jack Makepeace

30 January 2016
15:00

(BP) Darlington Mowden Park	36 – 26	Wharfedale (BP)

Northern Echo Arena
Attendance: 1,315
Referee: Fergus Kirby

30 January 2016
15:00

Esher	15 – 30	Plymouth Albion (BP)

Molesey Road
Attendance: 554
Referee: Michael Hudson

30 January 2016
15:00

Henley Hawks	25 – 19	Loughborough Students (BP)

Dry Leas
Attendance: 406
Referee: Tom Davies

30 January 2016
15:00

Rosslyn Park	14 – 12	Fylde (BP)

The Rock
Attendance: 275
Referee: Phil Davies

=== Round 21 ===
6 February 2016
14:00

(BP) Hull Ionians	19 – 22	Esher (BP)

Brantingham Park
Attendance: 231
Referee: Christophe Ridley

6 February 2016
14:00

Loughborough Students	7 – 22	Darlington Mowden Park

Loughborough University Stadium
Attendance: 156
Referee: Jack Makepeace

6 February 2016
14:00

Wharfedale	21 – 15	Blackheath (BP)

The Avenue
Attendance: 376
Referee: Ben Blain

6 February 2016
14:15

Ampthill	21 – 5	Rosslyn Park

Dillingham Park
Attendance: 314
Referee: Michael Hudson

6 February 2016
14:30

(BP) Hartpury College	48 – 16	Henley Hawks

College Stadium
Attendance: 225
Referee: Gareth Holsgrove

6 February 2016
15:00

Fylde	25 – 14	Coventry

Woodlands Memorial Ground
Attendance: 724
Referee: Jamie Leahy

6 February 2016
15:00

Plymouth Albion	16 – 5	Blaydon

Brickfields
Attendance: 754
Referee: Thomas Davis

6 February 2016
15:00

(BP) Richmond	25 – 8	Cinderford

Athletic Ground
Attendance: 728
Referee: Fergus Kirby

=== Round 22 ===
13 February 2016
14:00

(BP) Blaydon	35 – 7	Hull Ionians

Crow Trees
Attendance: 302
Referee: Jake Makepeace

13 February 2016
14:15

(BP) Ampthill	35 – 29	Wharfedale (2BP)

Dillingham Park
Attendance: 212
Referee: Shane Lewis

13 February 2016
15:00

(BP) Blackheath	39 – 12	Loughborough Students

Rectory Field
Attendance: 383
Referee: James Sullivan

13 February 2016
15:00

Cinderford	22 – 34	Plymouth Albion (BP)

Dockham Road
Attendance: 271
Referee: Ben Blain

13 February 2016
15:00

(BP) Darlington Mowden Park	36 – 27	Hartpury College (BP)

Northern Echo Arena
Attendance: 988
Referee: Michael Hudson

13 February 2016
15:00

Esher	26 – 24	Fylde (BP)

Molesey Road
Attendance: 542
Referee: Matt Turvey

13 February 2016
15:00

Henley Hawks	0 – 36	Richmond (BP)

Dry Leas
Attendance: 305
Referee: James Clarke

13 February 2016
15:00

Rosslyn Park	22 – 16	Coventry (BP)

The Rock
Attendance: 405
Referee: Fergus Kirby

=== Round 23 ===
20 February 2016
14:00

(2 BP) Hull Ionians	24 – 28	Cinderford (BP)

Brantingham Park
Attendance: 196
Referee: Ben Blain

20 February 2016
14:00

(BP) Loughborough Students	19 – 21	Ampthill

Loughborough University Stadium
Attendance: 212
Referee: Tom Davis

20 February 2016
14:00

Wharfedale	15 – 27	Rosslyn Park

The Avenue
Attendance: 395
Referee: Jamie Leahy

20 February 2016
14:30

Hartpury College	15 – 9	Blackheath (BP)

College Stadium
Attendance: 380
Referee: Philip Davies

20 February 2016
15:00

(BP) Coventry	12 – 13	Esher

Butts Park Arena
Attendance: 1,195
Referee: James Sullivan

20 February 2016
15:00

Fylde	10 – 8	Blaydon (BP)

Woodlands Memorial Park
Attendance: 658
Referee: Andrew Jackson

20 February 2016
15:00

(BP) Plymouth Albion	27 – 8	Henley Hawks

Brickfields
Attendance: 1,171
Referee: David Parrott

20 February 2016
15:00

Richmond	14 – 7	Darlington Mowden Park (BP)

Athletic Park
Attendance: 702
Referee: Veryan Boscawan

=== Postponed matches (1) ===
27 February 2016
14:30

(BP) Blaydon	40 – 14	Henley Hawks

Crow Trees
Attendance: 185
Referee: Llyr ApGeraint Roberts

27 February 2016
15:00

Darlington Mowden Park	14 – 12	Blackheath (BP)

Northern Echo Arena
Attendance: 804
Referee: Jamie Leahy

27 February 2016
15:00

(BP) Fylde	19 – 25	Ampthill (BP)

Woodlands Memorial Ground
Attendance: 535
Referee: Phil Davies

=== Round 24 ===
4 March 2016
19:45

(BP) Rosslyn Park	29 – 17	Esher

The Rock
Attendance: 760
Referee: Fergus Kirby

5 March 2016
14:30

(BP) Blaydon	26 – 8	Coventry

Crow Trees
Attendance: 210
Referee: Ben Blain

5 March 2016
15:00

Ampthill	24 – 18	Hartpury College (BP)

Dillington Park
Attendance: 248
Referee: James Sullivan

5 March 2016
15:00

(BP) Blackheath	6 – 8	Richmond

Rectory Field
Attendance: 1,263
Referee: Mike Hudson

5 March 2016
15:00

Cinderford	24 – 21	Fylde (BP)

Dockham Road
Attendance: 187
Referee: Veryan Boscawen

5 March 2016
15:00

(BP) Darlington Mowden Park	17 – 24	Plymouth Albion

Northern Echo Arena
Attendance: 1,348
Referee: Keith Allen

5 March 2016
15:00

(BP) Henley Hawks	24 – 31	Hull Ionians (BP)

Dry Leas
Attendance: 265
Referee: Gareth Holsgrove

5 March 2016
15:00

Wharfedale	21 – 30	Loughborough Students (BP)

The Avenue
Attendance: 485
Referee: Lylr ApGeraint Roberts

=== Postponed matches (2) ===
12 March 2016
14:30

(2 BP) Blaydon	26 – 27	Loughborough Students (BP)

Crow Trees
Attendance: 258
Referee: Matt Turvey

=== Round 25 ===
19 March 2016
14:00

(2BP) Loughborough Students	32 – 37	Rosslyn Park (BP)

Loughborough University Stadium
Attendance: 243
Referee: Ben Blain

19 March 2016
14:30

(BP) Hartpury College	54 – 29	Wharfedale (BP)

College Stadium
Attendance: 252
Referee: Michael Hudson

19 March 2016
15:00

(BP) Coventry	33 – 27	Cinderford (2BP)

Butts Park Arena
Attendance: 851
Referee: Jack Makepeace

19 March 2016
15:00

(BP) Esher	42 – 29	Blaydon (BP)

Molesey Road
Attendance: 302
Referee: James Sullivan

19 March 2016
15:00

(BP) Fylde	35 – 21	Henley Hawks

Woodlands Memorial Ground
Attendance: 783
Referee: Matt Turvey

19 March 2016
15:00

(BP) Hull Ionians	20 – 22	Darlington Mowden Park

Brantingham Park
Attendance: 201
Referee: Darren Gamage

19 March 2016
15:00

Plymouth Albion	20 – 19	Blackheath (BP)

Brickfields
Attendance: 1,680
Referee: Veryan Boscawen

19 March 2016
15:00

Richmond	19 – 19	Ampthill

Athletic Ground
Attendance: 525
Referee: Daniel Parrott

=== Round 26 ===
2 April 2016
14:00

Loughborough Students	22 – 39	Hartpury College (BP)

Loughborough University Stadium
Attendance: 237
Referee: Jack Makepeace

2 April 2016
15:00

(BP) Ampthill	52 – 13	Plymouth Albion

Dillingham Park
Attendance: 627
Referee: Gareth Holsgrove

2 April 2016
15:00

(BP) Blackheath	54 – 16	Hull Ionians

Rectory Field
Attendance: 578
Referee: Phil Davies

2 April 2016
15:00

Cinderford	31 – 24	Esher (2BP)

Dockham Road
Attendance: 307
Referee: Christopher Ridley

2 April 2016
15:00

(BP) Darlington Mowden Park	40 – 14	Fylde

Northern Echo Arena
Attendance: 860
Referee: Shane Lewis

2 April 2016
15:00

Henley Hawks	27 – 39	Coventry (BP)

Dry Leas
Attendance: 475
Referee: James Clarke

2 April 2016
15:00

(BP) Rosslyn Park	46 – 22	Blaydon

The Rock
Attendance: 431
Referee: Dan Parrott

2 April 2016
15:00

(BP) Wharfedale	21 – 22	Richmond (BP)

The Avenue
Attendance: 543
Referee: Ben Blain

=== Round 27 ===
9 April 2016
14:00

(BP) Blaydon	45 – 23	Cinderford

Crow Trees
Attendance: 350
Referee: J Clarke

9 April 2016
14:30

Hartpury College	31 – 27	Rosslyn Park (2BP)

College Stadium
Attendance: 305
Referee: Jack Makepeace

9 April 2016
15:00

Coventry	27 – 10	Darlington Mowden Park

Butts Park Arena
Attendance: 1,043
Referee: Veryan Boscawen

9 April 2016
15:00

(BP) Esher	52 – 7	Henley Hawks

Molesey Road
Attendance: 548
Referee: Robert Warburton

9 April 2016
15:00

(BP) Fylde	30 – 45	Blackheath (BP)

Woodlands Memorial Ground
Attendance: 855
Referee: Steve Lee

9 April 2016
15:00

(2BP) Hull Ionians	34 – 36	Ampthill (BP)

Brantingham Park
Attendance: 244
Referee: Matt Turvey

9 April 2016
15:00

Plymouth Albion	30 – 10	Wharfedale

Brickfields
Attendance: 1,393
Referee: James Sullivan

9 April 2016
15:00

Richmond	29 – 12	Loughborough Students

Athletic Ground
Attendance: 715
Referee: Jamie Leany

=== Round 28 ===
16 April 2016
14:30

(2BP) Hartpury College	29 – 33	Richmond (BP)

College Stadium
Attendance: 500
Referee: Phillip Davies

16 April 2016
15:00

(BP) Ampthill	25 – 21	Fylde (BP)

Dillingham Park
Attendance: 238
Referee: Jamie Leahy

16 April 2016
15:00

Blackheath	20 – 20	Coventry

Rectory Field
Attendance: 520
Referee: Fergus Kirby

16 April 2016
15:00

Darlington Mowden Park	27 – 13	Esher

Northern Echo Arena
Attendance: 682
Referee: Ben Blain

16 April 2016
15:00

(BP) Henley Hawks	31 – 20	Blaydon

Dry Leas
Attendance: 285
Referee: Gareth Holsgrove

16 April 2016
15:00

(BP) Loughborough Students	24 – 28	Plymouth Albion

Loughborough University Stadium
Attendance: 223
Referee: James Clarke

16 April 2016
15:00

(BP) Rosslyn Park	43 – 10	Cinderford

The Rock
Attendance: 426
Referee: James Sullivan

16 April 2016
15:00

Wharfedale	10 – 18	Hull Ionians

The Avenue
Attendance: 580
Referee: Michael Hudson

=== Round 29 ===
23 April 2016
14:30

(BP) Blaydon	27 – 14	Darlington Mowden Park

Crow Trees
Attendance: 710
Referee: Andrew Taylorson

23 April 2016
15:00

(BP) Cinderford	34 – 27	Henley Hawks (2BP)

Dockham Road
Attendance: 450
Referee: Adam Leal

23 April 2016
15:00

Coventry	25 – 19	Ampthill (BP)

Butts Park Arena
Attendance: 1,435
Referee: Ben Blain

23 April 2016
15:00

(BP) Esher	21 – 24	Blackheath

Molesey Road
Attendance: 612
Referee: Matt Turvey

23 April 2016
15:00

Fylde	19 – 15	Wharfedale (BP)

Woodlands Memorial Ground
Attendance: 796
Referee: Llyr ApGeraint-Roberts

23 April 2016
15:00

(BP) Hull Ionians	38 – 27	Loughborough Students (BP)

Brantingham Park
Attendance: 339
Referee: Jamie Leahy

23 April 2016
15:00

(BP) Plymouth Albion	35 – 26	Hartpury College

Brickfields
Attendance: 1,843
Referee: James Clark

23 April 2016
15:00

(2BP) Richmond	22 – 25	Rosslyn Park (BP)

Athletic Ground
Attendance: 1,247
Referee: Dan Parrott

=== Round 30 ===
30 April 2016
15:00

Ampthill	20 – 13	Esher (BP)

Dillingham Park
Attendance: 570
Referee: Phillip Davies

30 April 2016
15:00

(BP) Blackheath	45 – 17	Blaydon

Rectory Field
Attendance: 852
Referee: Shane Lewis

- Blackheath's last ever first team game at the Rectory Field.

30 April 2016
15:00

(BP) Darlington Mowden Park	52 – 22	Cinderford

Northern Echo Arena
Attendance: 1,245
Referee: Llyr ApGeraint Roberts

30 April 2016
15:00

(BP) Hartpury College	68 – 21	Hull Ionians

College Stadium
Attendance: 500
Referee: Veryan Boscawen

30 April 2016
15:00

Henley Hawks	12 – 31	Rosslyn Park (BP)

Dry Leas
Attendance: 375
Referee: James Sullivan

30 April 2016
15:00

(BP) Loughborough Students	57 – 17	Fylde

Loughborough University Stadium
Attendance: 475
Referee: Neil Chivers

30 April 2016
15:00

(2BP) Richmond	39 – 40	Plymouth Albion (BP)

Athletic Ground
Attendance: 837
Referee: Christophe Ridley

30 April 2016
15:00

(BP) Wharfedale	28 – 24	Coventry (BP)

The Avenue
Attendance: 525
Referee: Ben Blain

== Attendances ==
Club	Home Games	Total	Average	Highest	Lowest	% Capacity
Ampthill	15	5,124	342	627	185	11%
Blackheath	15	10,422	695	1,263	383	20%
Blaydon	15	3,647	243	710	80	12%
Cinderford	15	4,276	285	450	187	11%
Coventry	15	17,277	1,152	1,435	851	29%
Darlington Mowden Park	15	15,302	1,020	1,348	682	4%
Esher	15	6,687	446	715	285	15%
Fylde	15	8,960	597	855	438	8%
Hartpury College	15	5,391	359	576	200	18%
Henley Hawks	15	5,544	370	485	265	9%
Hull Ionians	15	4,160	277	512	174	18%
Loughborough Students	15	4,982	332	664	156	11%
Plymouth Albion	15	17,299	1,153	1,843	754	14%
Richmond	15	10,388	693	1,247	279	15%
Rosslyn Park	15	8,270	551	1,604	275	28%
Wharfedale	15	7,167	478	581	325	24%

== Individual statistics ==
- Note if players are tied on tries or points the player with the lowest number of appearances is placed first (if they have the same number of games, then the less minutes played will rank first). Also note that points scorers includes tries as well as conversions, penalties and drop goals. Appearance figures also include coming on as substitutes (unused substitutes not included).

=== Top points scorers ===
Rank	Player	Team	Appearances	Points
1	(Wales) Gareth Thompson	Hartpury College	25	281
2	(England) Freddy Gabbitas	Blackheath	28	280
3	(England) Elliot Clements-Hill	Ampthill	24	229
4	(England) Chris Johnson	Fylde	25	215
5	(England) Matthew Shepherd	Plymouth Albion	30	189
6	(England) Robert Kirby	Richmond	26	186
7	(England) James Guy	Wharfedale	29	184
8	(England) Paul Roberts	Esher	23	182
9	(England) Thomas James	Esher; Loughborough Students	28	165
10	(England) Tom Whiteley	Rosslyn Park	18	147

=== Top try scorers ===
Rank	Player	Team	Appearances	Tries
1	(Lithuania) Jonas Mikalcius	Hartpury College	27	27
1	(England) Jason Smithson	Blaydon	29	27
2	(England) Hugo Ellis	Rosslyn Park	22	24
3	(England) Oliver Brennand	Fylde	30	21
4	(England) Jack Allcock	Richmond	27	20
4	(England) Simon Uzokwe	Darlington Mowden Park	28	20
5	(England) Chris Davies	Richmond	28	19
6	(England) Spencer Sutherland	Esher	22	18
6	(England) David Allen	Blackheath	26	18
7	(England) Charles Broughton	Richmond	25	15

== Season records ==
=== Team ===
Largest home win — 59 pts

71 – 12 Hartpury College at home to Blaydon on 23 January 2016

Largest away win — 46 pts

46 - 0 Hartpury College away to Henley Hawks on 17 October 2015

Most points scored — 71 pts

71 – 12 Hartpury College at home to Blaydon on 23 January 2016

Most tries in a match — 11

Hartpury College at home to Blaydon on 23 January 2016

Most conversions in a match — 9

Hartpury College at home to Hull Ionians on 30 April 2016

Most penalties in a match — 8

Hartpury College at home to Rosslyn Park on 9 April 2016

Most drop goals in a match — 3

Fylde away to Esher on 13 February 2016

=== Player ===
Most points in a match — 30

(Wales) Gareth Thompson for Hartpury College at home to Esher on 26 September 2015

Most tries in a match — 4 (x7)

(Lithuania) Jonas Mikalcius for Hartpury College away to Henley Hawks on 17 October 2015
(England) Spencer Sutherland for Esher at home to Coventry on 7 November 2015
(England) Peter Homan for Darlington Mowden Park at home to Hull Ionians on 21 November 2015
(Lithuania) Jonas Mikalcius for Hartpury College at home to Blaydon on 23 January 2016
(England) Ben Vellacott for Hartpury College at home to Blaydon on 23 January 2016
(England) Aquile Smith for Hull Ionians at home to Cinderford on 20 February 2016
(Lithuania) Jonas Mikalcius for Hartpury College at home to Wharfedale on 19 March 2016

Most conversions in a match — 9

(Wales) Gareth Thompson for Hartpury College at home to Hull Ionians on 30 April 2016

Most penalties in a match — 8

(Wales) Gareth Thompson for Hartpury College at home to Rosslyn Park on 9 April 2016

Most drop goals in a match — 3

(England) Chris Johnson for Fylde away to Esher on 13 February 2016

=== Attendances ===
Highest — 1,843

Plymouth Albion v Hartpury College on 23 April 2016

Lowest — 80

Blaydon v Fylde on 7 November 2015

Highest Average Attendance — 1,153

Plymouth Albion

Lowest Average Attendance — 243

Blaydon

== See also ==
- English rugby union system
- Rugby union in England
