= Kowloon RFC =

(Hong Kong) Kowloon RFC
- Full name: Kowloon RFC
- Founded: 1976
- Location: Hong Kong
- Ground: Kings Park (Capacity: 3,000)
- League: HKRFU Premiership
Team kit	2nd kit

Official website
- www.kowloon-rugby.com

Kowloon RFC is a rugby club based at King's Park, Kowloon, Hong Kong.

== History ==
The club was founded in 1976 by John Eastman, David Lacey, and Bill Trotter. They were supported by a donation of HK$3,000 from Vernon Roberts, the chairman of Hongkong Land.

=== Notable players ===
- (England) David Tait – former Sale Sharks player. Died in December 2012.
- Ignacio Elosu – Argentina U21 international, former Castres Olympique and Exeter Chiefs player.
- (England) Eni Gesinde – former Newcastle Falcons player.
- Henjo Van Niekerk – South Africa U19 international, former Blue Bulls and Venezia Mestre Rugby FC player.
- Tom Bury – Scotland U20 and Scotland 7's international.
- Adam Dehaty – England U21 international, former Newcastle Falcons player.
- Mike Waywell – England Counties XV international.
- Mark Goosen – Hong Kong international.
- Alex Harris – Hong Kong international.
- So Hok Ken – Hong Kong international.
- Andy Li – Hong Kong international.
- Chris McAdam – Hong Kong international.
- Alan Graham – Hong Kong international.
- Tom McColl – Hong Kong international.
- Jeff Wong – Hong Kong international.
- Leon Wei – Hong Kong international.
- Jonny Rees – Hong Kong international.
- Tomasi Lawa – Hong Kong international.
- Eni Gesidne – Hong Kong international.
- Don Rintoul – Hong Kong international.
- Peter Clough – Hong Kong international.
