= Mike Waywell =

English rugby union player

- Born: 25 September 1988 (age 38) Maghull, Merseyside, England
- Height: 1.86 m (6 ft 1 in)
- Weight: 87 kg (13 st 10 lb)

Rugby union career
- Position(s): Inside-centre, Fly-half
- Current team: Sedgley Park
Senior career
Years	Team	Apps	(Points)
2006-07	Preston Grasshoppers	1	(0)
2007-08	Altrincham Kersal	3	(5)
2008-13	Fylde	105	(362)
2013-14	Sedgley Park	13	(25)
2014-15	Kowloon		
2015-	Sedgley Park	10	(10)
- Correct as of 2 May 2015

Mike Waywell (born 25 September 1988 in Maghull, Liverpool, England), formerly of Sale Sharks is an English rugby union player who has represented England Counties XV and Lancashire. He currently plays inside centre but has previously played professionally at Fly-half. He has had most club level success at Fylde but his current club is Sedgley Park.

== Rugby union career ==
A product of the Sale Sharks academy, Mike began his career by playing academy rugby for Sale as well as lower league club rugby for Preston Grasshoppers and Altrincham Kersal before being signed by Fylde part way through the 2007–08 season. While playing for Fylde, Mike was part of a squad that won three consecutive Lancashire Cup titles as well as gaining promotion to National League 1 by becoming National League 2 North champions in 2010-11 playing alongside former England legend Jason Robinson. While at Fylde Mike proved to be a highly versatile and valuable player scoring both tries and being a reliable points kicker with 362 points scored in his 5 1/2 seasons spent with the club. It was his performances for Fylde which led to Mike being called up by the Lancashire county team which he helped to win the prestigious Bill Beaumont in 2010 - a feat which also saw him be awarded the Lancashire Young Player of the Year. Further good performances for Fylde meant that Mike was also selected for the England Counties XV in 2012, playing an Irish Clubs XV in Preston.

in 2012 Mike left Fylde to move to Hong Kong where he spent a season at Kowloon in the Hong Kong Premiership - a spell blighted by restricted game time due to Visa issues and the tragic death of his friend and fellow player, David Tait. After his brief experience abroad Mike returned to Fylde before switching to Sedgley Park a division below in National League 2 North for the 2013–14 season. Mike made this move as he had just opened a gym in the summer and was unable to juggle his business with the increased travel demands of Fylde in National League 1.

== Honours ==
Fylde

- Lancashire Cup winner (3 times): 2009, 2010, 2011
- Lancashire Young Player of the Year Award winner
- National League 2 North champions: 2010-11

County/Representative

- Bill Beaumont Cup winner with Lancashire: 2010
- Selected for England Counties XV: 2012
