= Chris Johnson (rugby union) =

English rugby union player (born 1981)

- Born: 2 October 1981 (age 45)
- School: Home Educated
- University: University of Huddersfield

Rugby union career
- Position(s): Fly-half, Centre
- Current team: Sale
Senior career
Years	Team	Apps	(Points)
2006–12, 18–19	Huddersfield	173	(2,070)
2012–16	Fylde	111	(999)
2016–18, 19-	Sale FC	69	(476)
- Correct as of 27 April 2019
International career
Years	Team	Apps	(Points)
2009, 12–16	England Counties XV	8	(86)
- Correct as of 18 May 2018

Chris Johnson (born 1981) is an English rugby union footballer, currently playing at Fly-half or Centre for Sale in National League 1. An outstanding player who can kick points, drop goals, and score tries, he is one of the most prolific scorers of all time in both National League 2 North and National League 1, with over 3,000 points spread across the two divisions from his time with Huddersfield, Fylde and Sale. Johnson has also had a very successful representative career, winning the Bill Beaumont Cup five times with Lancashire, and captaining the England Counties XV.

== Career ==
=== Huddersfield ===
Growing up in Lancashire where he played junior rugby at Rochdale, upon finishing school Johnson moved across the Pennines to study at the University of Huddersfield. While at university Johnson came to the attention of local rugby union side, Huddersfield, who were playing in North Division 1 (now known as National League 3 North) and signed with them for the 2006–07 season. In 2008 Huddersfield finished runners up in the league to Kendal, qualifying for a promotion playoff against Midlands Division 1 runners up Luctonians, with the Yorkshire side gaining home advantage due to a better comparable league standing. Johnson was outstanding in the playoff game at Lockwood Park, kicking 18 points in the 22–7 victory against Luctonians, and helping Huddersfield achieve a first ever promotion to the National Leagues.

The 2008–09 season was the first for Huddersfield in National Division 3 North and they managed to finish 10th out of the 14 teams, way clear of relegation. Johnson also adapted well to the higher level with 248 points making him the third top scorer in the division, which included 7 drop goals across the season. Outside of the league, Chris starred in a Huddersfield side that made it to the semi-finals of the Yorkshire Cup, going out 6–13 to eventual winners Leeds Carnegie. This form saw Lancashire born Johnson selected by reigning county champions Yorkshire as member of their 2009 Bill Beaumont Cup squad, although he could not help the side retain the cup. He also made his England Counties XV debut in March 2009, starting in the 19–27 defeat to France Federale XV at the match at Twickenham. The 2009–10 season saw National Division 3 North re-branded as National League 2 North as part of the RFU's changes to the English league system, which would also see the division increase by 2 teams to 16. Huddersfield ended the season in 11th while Johnson scored 327 points to one more finish as the third most prolific points scorer in the division. At the end of the season Johnson's form with his club side would once again see him called up by Yorkshire for the 2010 Bill Beaumont Cup.

The 2010–11 season saw Huddersfield finish 8th in the league with Johnson becoming the top scorer in the division with 387 points, including a career best 15 tries. He also played a key role in Huddersfield winning the Yorkshire Cup for the first time in the club's history, scoring 15 points in a 25–18 win over Hull in the final held at York. The final act of Johnson's season saw him switch his county allegiance from Yorkshire to the county of his birth, Lancashire, and he was part of the squad that would win the 2011 Bill Beaumont Cup. 2011–12 would be Johnson's final season at the club and he went out on a successful note as he helped Huddersfield to a highest ever position in the league as they finished in 6th place. Once again he would also finish as top scorer in the league with 362 points. He was also picked once for Lancashire for the 2012 Bill Beaumont Cup, playing in the final at Twickenham Stadium in a 38 – 20 defeat to Hertfordshire. Despite finishing runners up, Johnson had a fantastic tournament scoring 62 points, with 24 of those coming in the 54–33 victory away to former county side Yorkshire in front of 2,023 supporters at Scarborough – a record crowd for the ground.

=== Fylde ===
In the summer of 2012, after six seasons with Huddersfield and over 1,800 points scored, Johnson decided to move back to Lancashire to sign for Fylde, playing one division higher in National League 1. His first season in National League 1 saw him became a regular in a Fylde side that finished the 2012–13 season in 6th place, scoring 251 points (the 4th highest tally in the division). As well as playing league games, Johnson also took part in the Fylde side that reached the semi-finals of the Lancashire Cup, losing 24–25 to rivals Preston Grasshoppers at home. Johnson was also called up to the Lancashire for the 2013 Bill Beaumont Cup where he had an excellent tournament, scoring 36 points (the second highest in the competition), 15 of which came the final in a 35–26 victory against Cornwall. He finished off the year by being selected for the England Counties XV side on their tour summer tour of Belgium. He played against Belgium 'A', leading his side out as captain and scoring 28 points (including 1 try) in a 78–0 victory. A second appearance would follow as he scored a try in a 57–5 win over Belgium to cap off a very successful season.

The 2013–14 season with Fylde saw his club finish an excellent 3rd in the league with Johnson once more one of the top scorers in the league with 272 points including 10 tries. Consistent good performances with Fylde saw Johnson come to the attention of Premiership side, Sale Sharks, and he was picked to play for the Jets development side, making his A-League debut in October 2013, scoring a try and drop goal in a 40–19 win against Northampton Wanderers at Heywood Road. At the start of 2014 Johnson captained England Counties XV as they lost very close games against France Federale XV and an Irish Club XV. His season finished with for Lancashire at the 2014 Bill Beaumont Cup, finishing as the competition's top scorer with 60 points as his county retained the trophy with a 36–26 victory over last year's finalists, Cornwall.

The 2014–15 season saw Fylde drop one place down to finish 5th in the league, with Johnson ending up as the second highest scorer in the division with 252 points (behind Richmond's Rob Kirby). Johnson would also return to action with England Counties XV at the start of 2015, scoring 7 points in a 37–3 victory against a Scottish Club XV in front of 1,200 supporters at Fylde's Woodlands Memorial Ground. He was even better in the next game for Counties as he bagged all 24 points in a 24 – 15 win against France Federale XV at Périgueux. The year would finish with Lancashire at the 2015 Bill Beaumont Cup, scoring 21 points as his side reached their fourth successive final, only to lose 18–13 against Cornwall, who avenged the two previous final defeats. The 2015–16 season was the last for Johnson at Fylde, scoring 215 points from 25 games as his side finished in 6th place. He also made further appears for England Counties in a 27 – 57 defeat against Scottish Clubs XV at Netherdale, as well as appearing for Lancashire at the 2016 Bill Beaumont Cup as his side failed to make the final for the first time in eight years.

=== Sale FC ===
In the summer of 2016, after four seasons with Fylde, over 900 points scored for the club, and multiple county championship triumphs with Lancashire, Johnson decided to sign for Sale FC, playing one division below in National League 2 North. Reasons given for the move were that Johnson wanted to cut down on travel (Sale FC were closer to where he worked) and that his new club had more potential for winning silverware in the future. Although he was relegated to reserve kicker behind team-mate Luke McGovern he featured in all of Sale's games as they finished second to league champions Caldy. Unfortunately for Johnson his team were unable to grab promotion at the second chance of asking as they lost their promotion playoff game at home to National League 2 South runners up Old Elthamians. The disappointment of missing out on promotion was tempered as Johnson was called up to the Lancashire who went on to win the 2017 Bill Beaumont Cup. He started the final and kicked two conversions as his side beat Cornwall 19–8 at Twickenham Stadium for the counties 24th title and the first since 2014.

His second season (2017–18) at Sale FC was an excellent one. With Luke McGovern leaving the club, Johnson once again became the main kicker. He was ever present in the Sale FC that went on to become champions of National League 2 North, contributing 324 (second highest in league) as his club finished five points clear of runners up Sedgley Park to gain promotion to National League 1. Promotion was followed by more silverware as Johnson scored 55 points for Lancashire during the 2018 Bill Beaumont Cup, including 22 points in the 33-16 win over Hertfordshire in the final.

=== Second spell at Huddersfield ===
Although Johnson started the 2018–19 season with Sale FC in National League 1, in November 2018 he decided to drop down a league and return to play for former club, Huddersfield in National League 2 North, after an absence of six years. The reasons for him leaving were due to family commitments and the greater amount of travel required in National League 1. Despite not playing a full-season, he still managed to finish in the top 5 scorers in the league, scoring 222 points, and helping Huddersfield to a best-ever 4th place finish.

=== Second spell at Sale FC ===
In June 2019, Johnson resigned with Sale FC, once more playing in National League 1 for the 2019-20 season.

== Season-by-season playing stats ==
=== Club ===
Season	Club	Competition	Appearances	Tries	Drop Goals	Conversions	Penalties	Total Points
2006–07	Huddersfield	North 1	18	2	1	27	34	169
2006–07	Huddersfield	Yorkshire Cup	2	1	0	3	0	11 (Note: Johnson played 2 games in the 2006–07 Yorkshire Cup, scoring 11 points in the 21–52 defeat to Wharfedale. He is likely to have scored more points as he played a key role in the 16–14 win against Leeds Tykes in the first round of the cup but there is no details available online.)
2007–08	Huddersfield	North 1	14	10	4	24	26	188
2007–08	Huddersfield	EDF Energy Trophy	1	0	0	0	3	9
2007–08	Huddersfield	Yorkshire Cup	1	0	0	0	0	9
2008–09	Huddersfield	National Division 3 North	22	5	7	29	48	248
2008–09	Huddersfield	EDF Energy Trophy	2	1	0	7	0	19
2008–09	Huddersfield	Yorkshire Cup	3	5	0	12	4	61
2009–10	Huddersfield	National League 2 North	28	7	0	62	56	327
2009–10	Huddersfield	Yorkshire Cup	1	0	0	2	1	7 (Note: Johnson played at least 1 game in the 2009–10 Yorkshire Cup, scoring 11 points in the 22–14 win away to Cleckheaton in the first round. He may have played (and scored) in 14 29 defeat away to Sandal in the quarter-final but there are no clear press reports.)
2010–11	Huddersfield	National League 2 North	27	15	5	72	51	387
2010–11	Huddersfield	Yorkshire Cup	3	0	1	5	9	40
2011–12	Huddersfield	National League 2 North	30	10	6	48	66	362
2011–12	Huddersfield	Yorkshire Cup	1	1	0	3	0	11 (Note: Johnson played at least 1 game in the 2011–12 Yorkshire Cup, scoring 11 points in the 29–19 win away to Bradford & Bingley in the quarter-finals. He may have played (and scored) in the 20–22 defeat away to Wharfedale in the semi-finals but there are no clear press reports.)
2012–13	Fylde	National League 1	28	7	1	66	27	251
2012–13	Fylde	Lancashire Cup	1	0	0	3	1	9
2013–14	Fylde	National League 1	28	10	1	81	19	272
2014–15	Fylde	National League 1	29	7	0	89	13	252
2015–16	Fylde	National League 1	25	4	3	60	22	215
2016–17	Sale FC	National League 2 North	30	5	3	1	7	57
2017–18	Sale FC	National League 2 North	30	4	1	98	39	324
2018–19	Sale FC	National League 1	9	0	1	22	12	83
2018–19	Huddersfield	National League 2 North	20	5	4	52	27	222
2019–20	Sale FC	National League 1						

=== County/Representative ===
Season	Club	Competition	Appearances	Tries	Drop Goals	Conversions	Penalties	Total Points
2008–09	England Counties XV	Test match	1	0	0	0	0	0
2008–09	Yorkshire	Bill Beaumont Cup	2 (Note: Played at least 2 games at the 2009 Bill Beaumont Cup but is likely to have played in first game at Northumberland. Apart from the Yorkshire game it is unclear how many points Johnson score although he did get at least 11 points including scoring a try against Warwickshire.)	1	0	0	2	11
2009–10	Yorkshire	Bill Beaumont Cup	1 (Note: Was in Yorkshire squad for 2010 Bill Beaumont and definitely played game against Cheshire and probably against Lancashire as well, although press coverage of competition was very poor this season. Also unsure if he scored any points against Cheshire although he was not the main kicker this season – Richard Vasey was.)	?	?	?	?	?
2010–11	Lancashire	Bill Beaumont Cup	0 (Note: Was in Lancashire squad for 2011 Bill Beaumont Cup and may have played up to 3 games (including the final) as he was on the substitutes bench for each. Inconclusive press releases mean that his total appearance figure is uncertain but we do know he did not score any points in this season's competition.)	0	0	0	0	0
2011–12	Lancashire	Bill Beaumont Cup	4	3	0	16	5	62
2012–13	Lancashire	Bill Beaumont Cup	3 (Note: Played at least 3 games in 2013 Bill Beaumont Cup, scoring in each, but may have also played in Lancashire's first pool game in which he was on the substitutes bench but this is not clear from press reports.)	2	0	6	5	37
2012–13	England Counties XV	Tour of Belgium	2	2	0	10	1	33
2013–14	England Counties XV	Test matches	2	1	0	1	1	10
2013–14	Lancashire	Bill Beaumont Cup	4	4	0	14	4	60
2014–15	England Counties XV	Test matches	2	0	0	2	9	31
2014–15	Lancashire	Bill Beaumont Cup	4	0	0	3	5	21
2015–16	England Counties XV	Test matches	1	0	0	3	2	12
2015–16	Lancashire	Bill Beaumont Cup	3	1	0	6	5	32
2016–17	Lancashire	Bill Beaumont Cup	2 (Note: Played at least 2 games in 2017 Bill Beaumont Cup, scoring in each, but may have also played in Lancashire's second pool game as he was on the substitutes bench. However, whether he came on in this game is not clear from press reports.)	0	0	5	1	13
2017-18	Lancashire	Bill Beaumont Cup	3	0	17	6	1	55

== Honours and records ==
=== Club ===
Huddersfield

- North 1 v Midlands 1 promotion play-off winner: 2007–08
- Yorkshire Cup winner: 2011

Sale FC

- National League 2 North champions: 2017–18

Yorkshire

- Represented county in Bill Beaumont Cup: 2009, 2010

Lancashire

- Bill Beaumont Cup winner (5): 2011, 2013, 2014, 2017, 2018

=== Personal ===
- National League 2 North top points scorer (2): 2010–11 (387 points), 2011–12 (362 points)
- Bill Beaumont Cup top points scorer (2): 2014 (60 points), 2018 (55 points)
- Capped by England Counties XV: 2013, 2014, 2015, 2016
