= Waywell =

Waywell is a surname. Notable people with the surname include:

- Geoffrey B. Waywell (1944–2016), British archaeologist and classical scholar
- Mike Waywell (born 1988), English rugby union player
