= 2010–11 National League 2 North =

Rugby union competition in England

- Countries: England
- Champions: Fylde
- Runners-up: Loughborough Students
- Relegated: Manchester, Rugby Lions, Morley
- Attendance: 60,630 (average 268 per match) (Note: Note that 14 home attendances are missing (see below) - so the total attendance will not be 100% accurate. The average attendance has also been taken into account with the missing games not included.)
- Highest attendance: 2,415; Fylde v Preston Grasshoppers; 11 September 2010
- Lowest attendance: 50; Huddersfield v Hull Ionians; 11 December 2010
- Top point scorer: (England) Chris Johnson (Huddersfield); 387 points
- Top try scorer: (England) Gareth Collins (Leicester Lions); 32 tries

The 2010–11 National League 2 North was the second season (twenty-fourth overall) of the fourth tier (north) of the English domestic rugby union competitions since the professionalised format of the second division was introduced. The league system was 4 points for a win, 2 points for a draw and additional bonus points being awarded for scoring 4 or more tries and/or losing within 7 points of the victorious team. In terms of promotion the league champions would go straight up into National League 1 while the runners up would have a one-game playoff against the runners up from National League 2 South (at the home ground of the club with the superior league record) for the final promotion place.

The league title ended up going to Fylde who finished 14 points clear of runners up Loughborough Students to gain promotion to the 2011–12 National League 1- quite a turnaround for a team that finished 9th the season before. Although there were 14 points between the two sides, Fylde actually only won one more game, but in the end it was the accumulating of bonus points that really pulled the Lancashire side clear, as they claimed 28 to Loughborough Students 23 (almost one a game). As well as being the best team in the division Fylde also pulled in the most fans with almost 14,000 supporters attending Woodlands over the course of the season (a great record for a division which had seen dwindling attendances over the years). Loughborough Students did have a second chance to go up against the 2010–11 National League 2 South runners up Jersey, but lost heavily away at St. Peter in front of a large crowd of over 3,000, to consign the Students to another year in National League 2 North, in what was their second playoff defeat in a row.

At the bottom of the table, Manchester had another shocking season, comfortably the worst team in the division with no points (not even bonus points) occurred with almost 2,000 points conceded, and suffering their fourth consecutive relegation since they dropped from the 2008–09 National Division One (now the Championship) in what was the worst overall league performance in the division since league rugby began. Rugby Lions were little better, with two of their three wins coming against the hapless Manchester, going down as the second relegated team with just 20 points, for what was their second relegation in a row. The final spot was far more competitive, with five teams separated by just 2 points but in a dramatic final game (which had been rescheduled from February), Hull Ionians managed to beat Morley away from home 27 - 25 and send the newly promoted Maroons back to their former league. Manchester and Rugby Lions would drop down to National League 3 North while Rugby Lions fell to National League 3 Midlands.

== Participating teams and locations ==
Twelve of the teams listed below participated in the 2009–10 National League 2 North season; Manchester and Nuneaton were relegated from the 2009–10 National League 1 while Luctonians came up as playoff winners from National League 3 Midlands along with Morley who were champions of National League 3 North. Ampthill had finished 2009-10 as champions of National League 3 Midlands and would have joined National League 2 North or the 2010–11 National League 2 South had they not been found in breach of regulations during a league game which cost them both the league title and promotion.

Locations of the 2010-11 National League 2 North teams

Team	Stadium	Capacity	City/Area
Caldy	Paton Field	4,000	Thurstaston, Wirral, Merseyside
Fylde	Woodlands Memorial Ground	7,500 (500 seats)	Lytham St. Annes, Lancashire
Harrogate	Claro Road	4,500 (500 seats)	Harrogate, North Yorkshire
Huddersfield	Lockwood Park	1,500 (500 seats)	Huddersfield, West Yorkshire
Hull	Ferens Ground	1,500 (288 seats)	Kingston upon Hull, East Riding of Yorkshire
Hull Ionians	Brantingham Park	2,500 (240 seats)	Brantingham, East Riding of Yorkshire
Kendal	Mint Bridge	4,600 (600 seats)	Kendal, Cumbria
Leicester Lions	Westleigh Park	2,000	Blaby, Leicestershire
Loughborough Students	Loughborough University Stadium	3,000	Loughborough, Leicestershire
Luctonians	Mortimer Park	2,500 (300 seats)	Kingsland, Herefordshire
Manchester	Grove Park	4,000	Cheadle Hulme, Greater Manchester
Morley	Scatcherd Lane	6,000 (1,000 seats)	Morley, Leeds, West Yorkshire
Nuneaton	Liberty Way	3,800 (500 seats)	Nuneaton, Warwickshire
Preston Grasshoppers	Lightfoot Green	2,250 (250 seats)	Preston, Lancashire
Rugby Lions	Webb Ellis Road	4,000 (200 seats)	Rugby, Warwickshire
Westoe	Wood Terrace		South Shields, Tyne and Wear

== Final league table ==
2010–11 National League 2 North table
Pos	Team	Pld	W	D	L	PF	PA	PD	TB	LB	Pts	Qualification
1	Fylde (C)	30	26	0	4	1259	523	+736	26	2	132	Promoted
2	Loughborough Students	30	25	0	5	1132	437	+695	20	3	123	Promotion play-off
3	Leicester Lions	30	24	0	6	987	508	+479	15	4	115	
4	Westoe	30	23	0	7	986	521	+465	17	3	107 (Note: 5 points deducted)	
5	Caldy	30	18	0	12	1047	750	+297	17	8	97	
6	Harrogate	30	15	1	14	884	717	+167	19	3	84	
7	Hull	30	16	2	12	864	639	+225	16	4	83	
8	Huddersfield	30	15	2	13	836	610	+226	7	6	77	
9	Luctonians	30	14	1	15	754	693	+61	12	10	75	
10	Kendal	30	11	0	19	719	829	−110	7	10	61	
11	Nuneaton	30	12	1	17	655	805	−150	7	3	60	
12	Preston Grasshoppers (Note: Preston Grasshoppers game at home to Rugby Lions would be cancelled due to fixture congestion.)	29	11	1	17	708	721	−13	8	6	60	
13	Hull Ionians	30	10	2	18	790	889	−99	10	5	59	
14	Morley (R)	30	11	0	19	705	822	−117	9	5	58	Relegated
15	Rugby Lions (Note: Rugby Lions game at Preston Grasshoppers was cancelled due to fixture congestion.) (R)	29	3	0	26	397	1479	−1082	6	2	20	Relegated
16	Manchester (R)	30	0	0	30	205	1985	−1780	0	0	0	Relegated

Updated to match(es) played on 21-05-2011. Source: Rugby Statbunker
(C) Champion; (R) Relegated

== Results ==
=== Round 1 ===
4 September 2010

(BP) Harrogate	39 - 17	Nuneaton
	Report

Claro Road
Attendance: 160
Referee: Andrew Jackson

4 September 2010

Hull Ionians	13 - 34	Fylde (BP)
	Report

Brantingham Park
Attendance: 300
Referee: Brendan Fitzmaurice

4 September 2010

(BP) Kendal	22 - 29	Hull (BP)
	Report

Mint Bridge
Attendance: 271
Referee: Matthew Daubney

4 September 2010

(BP) Luctonians	18 - 20	Leicester Lions
	Report

Mortimer Park
Referee: Darren Gamage

4 September 2010

Manchester	3 - 46	Loughborough Students (BP)
	Report

Grove Park
Attendance: 180
Referee: Karl Kirkpatrick

4 September 2010

Morley	25 - 50	Caldy (BP)
	Report

Scatcherd Lane
Attendance: 200
Referee: Wayne Falla

4 September 2010

Preston Grasshoppers	31 - 22	Huddersfield
	Report

Lightfoot Green
Attendance: 239
Referee: D Edmunds

4 September 2010

Rugby Lions	16 - 57	Westoe (BP)
	Report

Webb Ellis Road
Attendance: 270
Referee: Matt Carley

=== Round 2 ===
11 September 2010

(BP) Caldy	48 - 17	Kendal
	Report

Paton Field
Attendance: 231
Referee: Brendan Fitzmaurice

11 September 2010

(BP) Fylde	48 - 17	Preston Grasshoppers
	Report

Woodlands Memorial Ground
Attendance: 2,415
Referee: Nick Cockburn

11 September 2010

Huddersfield	27 - 11	Morley
	Report

Lockwood Park
Attendance: 267
Referee: Trevor Fisher

11 September 2010

(BP) Hull	47 - 27	Harrogate (BP)
	Report

Ferens Ground
Attendance: 250
Referee: Rob Sheard

11 September 2010

(BP) Loughborough Students	90 - 0	Rugby Lions
	Report

Loughborough University Stadium
Attendance: 150
Referee: Shane Lewis

11 September 2010

Manchester	6 - 45	Luctonians (BP)
	Report

Grove Park
Attendance: 142
Referee: Mark Liddell

11 September 2010

(BP) Nuneaton	21 - 27	Leicester Lions (BP)
	Report

Liberty Way
Attendance: 143
Referee: Tom Davis

11 September 2010

Westoe	20 - 19	Hull Ionians (BP)
	Report

Wood Terrace
Attendance: 121
Referee: Revis Phillips

=== Round 3 ===
18 September 2010
14:30

(BP) Leicester Lions	40 - 3	Hull
	Report

Westleigh Park
Attendance: 100
Referee: Revis Phillips

18 September 2010
14:30

(BP) Rugby Lions	33 - 21	Manchester
	Report

Webb Ellis Road
Attendance: 165
Referee: Nick Cockburn

18 September 2010
15:00

(2BP) Harrogate	30 - 32	Caldy (BP)
	Report

Claro Road
Attendance: 203
Referee: Andrew Vertigan

18 September 2010
15:00

Hull Ionians	24 - 41	Loughborough Students (BP)
	Report

Brantingham Park
Attendance: 200
Referee: Will Halford

18 September 2010
15:00

(BP) Kendal	22 - 26	Huddersfield
	Report

Mint Bridge
Attendance: 240
Referee: Brendan Fitzmaurice

18 September 2010
15:00

Luctonians	23 - 15	Nuneaton
	Report

Mortimer Park
Attendance: 250
Referee: Karl Kirkpatrick

18 September 2010
15:00

Morley	14 - 25	Fylde (BP)
	Report

Scatcherd Lane
Attendance: 200
Referee: Matthew Daubney

18 September 2010
15:00

Preston Grasshoppers	8 - 34	Westoe
	Report

Lightfoot Green
Attendance: 261
Referee: Wayne Falla

=== Round 4 ===
25 September 2010
14:00

(BP) Loughborough Students	48 - 21	Preston Grasshoppers
	Report

Loughborough University Stadium
Attendance: 250
Referee: Rob Sheard

25 September 2010
14:30

Rugby Lions	14 - 35	Luctonians (BP)
	Report

Webb Ellis Road
Attendance: 234
Referee: Richard Phillips

25 September 2010
15:00

(BP) Caldy	21 - 26	Leicester Lions
	Report

Paton Field
Attendance: 279
Referee: Simon McConnell

25 September 2010
15:00

(BP) Fylde	41 - 12	Kendal
	Report

Woodlands Memorial Ground
Attendance: 1,260
Referee: Matthew Daubney

25 September 2010
15:00

Huddersfield	27 - 5	Harrogate
	Report

Lockwood Park
Attendance: 313
Referee: Will Halford

25 September 2010
15:00

(BP) Hull	27 - 13	Nuneaton
	Report

Ferens Ground
Attendance: 150
Referee: Mark Liddell

25 September 2010
15:00

Manchester	0 - 62	Hull Ionians (BP)
	Report

Grove Park
Attendance: 182
Referee: D Edmunds

25 September 2010

(BP) Westoe	54 - 3	Morley
	Report

Wood Terrace
Attendance: 200
Referee: Brendan Fitzmaurice

=== Round 5 ===
2 October 2010

Harrogate	20 - 30	Fylde (BP)
	Report

Claro Road
Attendance: 320
Referee: Brendan Fitzmaurice

2 October 2010

(BP) Hull Ionians	68 - 20	Rugby Lions
	Report

Brantingham Park
Attendance: 200
Referee: David Procter

2 October 2010

Kendal	21 - 31	Westoe (BP)
	Report

Mint Bridge
Attendance: 182
Referee: Karl Kirkpatrick

2 October 2010

Leicester Lions	23 - 13	Huddersfield
	Report

Westleigh Park
Attendance: 100
Referee: Nick Williams

2 October 2010

Luctonians	23 - 20	Hull (BP)
	Report

Mortimer Park
Attendance: 200
Referee: Tom Davis

2 October 2010

Morley	9 - 20	Loughborough Students
	Report

Scatcherd Lane
Attendance: 200
Referee: Nick Cockburn

2 October 2010

Nuneaton	16 - 25	Caldy
	Report

Liberty Way
Attendance: 191
Referee: John Meredith

2 October 2010

(BP) Preston Grasshoppers	70 - 5	Manchester
	Report

Lightfoot Green
Attendance: 208
Referee: D Edmunds

=== Round 6 ===
9 October 2010

(BP) Caldy	26 - 17	Hull
	Report

Paton Field
Attendance: 201
Referee: Marcus Caton

9 October 2010

(2BP) Fylde	30 - 32	Leicester Lions (BP)
	Report

Woodlands Memorial Ground
Attendance: 1,235
Referee: Wayne Falla

9 October 2010

(BP) Huddersfield	57 - 13	Nuneaton
	Report

Lockwood Park
Attendance: 260
Referee: Will Halford

9 October 2010

Hull Ionians	15 - 39	Luctonians (BP)
	Report

Brantingham Park
Attendance: 200
Referee: Michael Dickens

9 October 2010

(BP) Loughborough Students	67 - 17	Kendal
	Report

Loughborough University Stadium
Referee: Steve Penfold

9 October 2010

Manchester	14 - 27	Morley (BP)
	Report

Grove Park
Attendance: 183
Referee: Mark Liddell

9 October 2010

(BP) Rugby Lions	24 - 50	Preston Grasshoppers (BP)
	Report

Webb Ellis Road
Attendance: 174
Referee: Phil Watters

9 October 2010

(BP) Westoe	27 - 19	Harrogate
	Report

Wood Terrace
Attendance: 262
Referee: Revis Phillips

=== Round 7 ===
16 October 2010
14:00

Harrogate	17 - 34	Loughborough Students (BP)
	Report

Claro Road
Attendance: 250
Referee: Tom Davis

16 October 2010
15:00

(BP) Hull	34 - 0	Huddersfield
	Report

Ferens Ground
Attendance: 150
Referee: Revis Phillips

16 October 2010
15:00

(BP) Kendal	74 - 0	Manchester
	Report

Mint Bridge
Attendance: 275
Referee: Rob Sheard

16 October 2010

Leicester Lions	11 - 5	Westoe (BP)
	Report

Westleigh Park

16 October 2010

(2BP) Luctonians	29 - 32	Caldy (BP)
	Report

Mortimer Park
Attendance: 410
Referee: Brendan Fitzmaurice

16 October 2010

(BP) Nuneaton	36 - 53	Fylde (BP)
	Report

Liberty Way
Attendance: 191
Referee: Greg MacDonald

16 October 2010

Preston Grasshoppers	20 - 17	Hull Ionians (BP)
	Report

Lightfoot Green
Attendance: 203
Referee: Wayne Falla

16 October 2010

Rugby Lions	7 - 35	Morley (BP)
	Report

Webb Ellis Road
Attendance: 264
Referee: Karl Kirkpatrick

=== Round 8 ===
23 October 2010
14:00

Loughborough Students	13 - 10	Leicester Lions (BP)
	Report

Loughborough University Stadium
Attendance: 350
Referee: Karl Kirkpatrick

23 October 2010
14:30

Rugby Lions	13 - 34	Kendal (BP)
	Report

Webb Ellis Road
Attendance: 220
Referee: John Owen

23 October 2010
15:00

(BP) Fylde	37 - 8	Hull
	Report

Woodlands Memorial Ground
Attendance: 885
Referee: Brendan Fitzmaurice

23 October 2010
15:00

(BP) Huddersfield	27 - 34	Caldy (BP)
	Report

Lockwood Park
Attendance: 327
Referee: Wayne Falla

23 October 2010
15:00

(BP) Hull Ionians	46 - 17	Morley
	Report

Brantingham Park
Attendance: 200
Referee: S Bradford

23 October 2010
15:00

Manchester	3 - 62	Harrogate (BP)
	Report

Grove Park
Attendance: 121
Referee: Will Halford

23 October 2010
15:00

(BP) Preston Grasshoppers	50 - 10	Luctonians
	Report

Lightfoot Green
Attendance: 352
Referee: Revis Phillips

23 October 2010
15:00

(BP) Westoe	31 - 3	Nuneaton
	Report

Wood Terrace
Attendance: 150
Referee: Charles Samson

=== Round 9 ===
30 October 2010
14:00

(BP) Leicester Lions	90 - 0	Manchester
	Report

Westleigh Park
Attendance: 100
Referee: Mark Liddell

30 October 2010
15:00

(BP) Caldy	20 - 25	Fylde (BP)
	Report

Paton Field
Attendance: 382
Referee: Simon Harding

30 October 2010
15:00

(BP) Harrogate	99 - 7	Rugby Lions
	Report

Claro Road
Attendance: 250
Referee: Trevor Fisher

30 October 2010
15:00

(BP) Hull	17 - 23	Westoe
	Report

Ferens Ground
Attendance: 150
Referee: Brendan Fitzmaurice

30 October 2010
15:00

(BP) Kendal	19 - 20	Hull Ionians
	Report

Mint Bridge
Attendance: 260
Referee: Wayne Falla

30 October 2010
15:00

Luctonians	21 - 21	Huddersfield
	Report

Mortimer Park
Attendance: 485
Referee: Fergus Kirby

30 October 2010
15:00

Morley	18 - 39	Preston Grasshoppers (BP)
	Report

Scatcherd Lane
Attendance: 200
Referee: Rob Sheard

30 October 2010
15:00

Nuneaton	10 - 65	Loughborough Students (BP)
	Report

Liberty Way
Attendance: 153
Referee: Cemmy Rudkin

=== Round 10 ===
6 November 2010
14:00

Hull Ionians	5 - 27	Harrogate (BP)
	Report

Brantingham Park
Attendance: 200
Referee: D Edmunds

6 November 2010
14:00

(BP) Loughborough Students	48 - 14	Hull
	Report

Loughborough University Stadium
Attendance: 150
Referee: Wayne Falla

6 November 2010
14:00

(BP) Westoe	50 - 12	Caldy
	Report

Wood Terrace
Attendance: 199
Referee: Marcus Caton

6 November 2010
14:15

Manchester	17 - 43	Nuneaton (BP)
	Report

Grove Park
Attendance: 91
Referee: Rob Sheard

6 November 2010
14:15

(BP) Morley	17 - 21	Luctonians
	Report

Scatcherd Lane
Attendance: 250
Referee: S Bradford

6 November 2010
14:30

Rugby Lions	9 - 86	Leicester Lions (BP)
	Report

Webb Ellis Road
Attendance: 218
Referee: Karl Kirkpatrick

6 November 2010
15:00

(BP) Fylde	22 - 10	Huddersfield
	Report

Woodlands Memorial Ground
Attendance: 389
Referee: Dale Newitt

6 November 2010
15:00

(BP) Preston Grasshoppers	37 - 19	Kendal
	Report

Lightfoot Green
Attendance: 332
Referee: Brendan Fitzmaurice

=== Round 11 ===
13 November 2010
14:00

(BP) Hull	102 - 3	Manchester
	Report

Ferens Ground
Attendance: 180
Referee: Brendan Fitzmaurice

13 November 2010
14:00

Kendal	28 - 20	Morley
	Report

Mint Bridge
Attendance: 300
Referee: Trevor Fisher

13 November 2010
14:00

(BP) Leicester Lions	62 - 17	Hull Ionians
	Report

Westleigh Park
Attendance: 100
Referee: Will Halford

13 November 2010
14:15

(BP) Caldy	24 - 30	Loughborough Students (BP)
	Report

Paton Field
Attendance: 229
Referee: John Meredith

13 November 2010
14:15

(BP) Harrogate	25 - 8	Preston Grasshoppers
	Report

Claro Road
Attendance: 200
Referee: Rob Sheard

13 November 2010
14:15

(BP) Luctonians	26 - 19	Fylde (BP)
	Report

Mortimer Park
Attendance: 647
Referee: Shane Lewis

13 November 2010
15:00

(BP) Huddersfield	16 - 17	Westoe
	Report

Lockwood Park
Attendance: 177
Referee: Wayne Falla

14 November 2010
15:00

Nuneaton	20 - 15	Rugby Lions (BP)
	Report

Liberty Way
Attendance: 475
Referee: Mike Cooper

=== Round 12 ===
20 November 2010
14:00

(BP) Hull Ionians	30 - 25	Nuneaton (BP)
	Report

Brantingham Park
Attendance: 250
Referee: Wayne Falla

20 November 2010
14:00

(BP) Kendal	16 - 20	Luctonians
	Report

Mint Bridge
Attendance: 260
Referee: Rob Sheard

20 November 2010
14:00

(BP) Loughborough Students	37 - 10	Huddersfield
	Report

Loughborough University Stadium
Attendance: 200

20 November 2010
14:00

(BP) Westoe	23 - 5	Fylde
	Report

Wood Terrace
Attendance: 153
Referee: Steve Lee

20 November 2010
14:15

Manchester	3 - 82	Caldy (BP)
	Report

Grove Park
Attendance: 127
Referee: Trevor Fisher

20 November 2010
14:15

Morley	16 - 13	Harrogate (BP)
	Report

Scatcherd Lane
Attendance: 250
Referee: John Healy

20 November 2010
14:30

Rugby Lions	3 - 64	Hull (BP)
	Report

Webb Ellis Road
Attendance: 144
Referee: Will Halford

20 November 2010
15:00

Preston Grasshoppers	5 - 22	Leicester Lions
	Report

Lightfoot Green
Attendance: 217
Referee: Revis Phillips

=== Round 13 ===
27 November 2010
14:00

(BP) Hull	30 - 15	Hull Ionians
	Report

Ferens Ground
Attendance: 500
Referee: Darren Gamage

27 November 2010

Caldy	P - P	Rugby Lions

- Postponed. Game rescheduled to 5 February 2011.

27 November 2010

Fylde	P - P	Loughborough Students

- Postponed. Game rescheduled to 5 February 2011.

27 November 2010

Harrogate	P - P	Kendal

- Postponed. Game rescheduled to 5 February 2011.

27 November 2010

Huddersfield	P - P	Manchester

- Postponed. Game rescheduled to 5 February 2011.

27 November 2010

Leicester Lions	P - P	Morley

- Postponed. Game rescheduled to 5 February 2011.

27 November 2010

Luctonians	P - P	Westoe

- Postponed. Game rescheduled to 5 February 2011.

27 November 2010

Nuneaton	P - P	Preston Grasshoppers

- Postponed. Game rescheduled to 5 February 2011.

=== Round 14 ===
4 December 2010

Harrogate	P - P	Luctonians

- Postponed. Game rescheduled to 26 February 2011.

4 December 2010

Hull Ionians	P - P	Caldy

- Postponed. Game rescheduled to 26 February 2011.

4 December 2010

Kendal	P - P	Leicester Lions

- Postponed. Game rescheduled to 26 February 2011.

4 December 2010

Loughborough Students	P - P	Westoe

- Postponed. Game rescheduled to 21 May 2011.

4 December 2010

Manchester	P - P	Fylde

- Postponed. Game rescheduled to 26 February 2011.

4 December 2010

Morley	P - P	Nuneaton

- Postponed. Game rescheduled to 26 February 2011.

4 December 2010

Preston Grasshoppers	P - P	Hull

- Postponed. Game rescheduled to 26 February 2011.

4 December 2010

Rugby Lions	P - P	Huddersfield

- Postponed. Game rescheduled to 26 February 2011.

=== Round 15 ===
11 December 2010
14:00

(BP) Leicester Lions	13 - 17	Harrogate
	Report

Westleigh Park
Attendance: 100
Referee: Michael Dickens

11 December 2010
14:00

Nuneaton	23 - 16	Kendal (BP)
	Report

Liberty Way
Attendance: 147
Referee: Guy Steel Bodger

11 December 2010
14:00

(BP) Westoe	69 - 0	Manchester
	Report

Wood Terrace
Referee: Will Halford

11 December 2010
14:15

(BP) Caldy	18 - 22	Preston Grasshoppers
	Report

Paton Field
Attendance: 231
Referee: Matthew Daubney

11 December 2010
14:15

Luctonians	19 - 17	Loughborough Students (BP)
	Report

Mortimer Park
Attendance: 320
Referee: Andrew Vertigan

11 December 2010
15:00

(BP) Fylde	76 - 8	Rugby Lions
	Report

Woodlands Memorial Ground
Attendance: 505
Referee: Kirby Fergus

11 December 2010
15:00

(BP) Huddersfield	35 - 5	Hull Ionians
	Report

Lockwood Park
Attendance: 50
Referee: Wayne Falla

11 December 2010

Hull	P - P	Morley

- Postponed. Game rescheduled to 19 March 2011.

=== Round 16 ===
18 December 2010

Harrogate	P - P	Hull

- Postponed. Game rescheduled to 7 May 2011.

18 December 2010

Hull Ionians	P - P	Westoe

- Postponed. Game rescheduled to 19 March 2011.

18 December 2010

Kendal	P - P	Caldy

- Postponed. Game rescheduled to 19 March 2011.

18 December 2010

Leicester Lions	P - P	Nuneaton

- Postponed. Game rescheduled to 19 March 2011.

18 December 2010

Luctonians	P - P	Manchester

- Postponed. Game rescheduled to 19 March 2011.

18 December 2010

Morley	P - P	Huddersfield

- Postponed. Game rescheduled to 7 May 2011.

18 December 2010

Preston Grasshoppers	P - P	Fylde

- Postponed. Game rescheduled to 19 March 2011.

18 December 2010

Rugby Lions	P - P	Loughborough Students

- Postponed. Game rescheduled to 19 March 2011.

=== Round 17 ===
8 January 2011
14:00

Hull	9 - 17	Leicester Lions
	Report

Ferens Ground
Attendance: 150
Referee: Karl Kirkpatrick

8 January 2011
14:00

(BP) Loughborough Students	51 - 13	Hull Ionians
	Report

Loughborough University Stadium
Attendance: 100
Referee: Dale Newitt

8 January 2011
14:00

Westoe	19 - 10	Preston Grasshoppers
	Report

Wood Terrace
Attendance: 201
Referee: Revis Phillips

8 January 2011
14:15

Caldy	25 - 53	Harrogate (BP)
	Report

Paton Field
Attendance: 199
Referee: Brendan Fitzmaurice

8 January 2011
14:15

Manchester	23 - 32	Rugby Lions (BP)
	Report

Grove Park
Attendance: 173
Referee: D Edmunds

8 January 2011
14:15

Nuneaton	24 - 21	Luctonians (BP)
	Report

Liberty Way
Attendance: 173
Referee: Phil Watters

8 January 2011
15:00

(BP) Fylde	62 - 19	Morley
	Report

Woodlands Memorial Ground
Attendance: 757
Referee: Andrew Vertigan

8 January 2011

Huddersfield	P - P	Kendal

- Postponed. Game rescheduled to 14 May 2011.

=== Round 18 ===
15 January 2011
14:00

(BP) Hull Ionians	79 - 5	Manchester
	Report

Brantingham Park
Attendance: 200
Referee: Matthew Daubney

15 January 2011
14:00

Kendal	0 - 46	Fylde (BP)
	Report

Mint Bridge
Attendance: 650
Referee: Nick Cockburn

15 January 2011
14:00

Leicester Lions	17 - 5	Caldy
	Report

Westleigh Park
Attendance: 100
Referee: Michael Tutty

15 January 2011
14:00

Nuneaton	9 - 27	Hull
	Report

Liberty Way
Attendance: 149
Referee: Will Halford

15 January 2011
14:15

(BP) Harrogate	17 - 20	Huddersfield
	Report

Claro Road
Attendance: 280
Referee: Tom Davis

15 January 2011
14:15

(BP) Luctonians	39 - 15	Rugby Lions
	Report

Mortimer Park
Attendance: 385
Referee: D Edmunds

15 January 2011
14:15

Morley	14 - 7	Westoe
	Report

Scatcherd Lane
Attendance: 200
Referee: Rob Sheard

15 January 2011
15:00

Preston Grasshoppers	19 - 5	Loughborough Students
	Report

Lightfoot Green
Attendance: 234
Referee: Wayne Falla

=== Round 19 ===
22 January 2011
14:00

Hull	23 - 12	Luctonians
	Report

Ferens Ground
Attendance: 175
Referee: Brendan Fitzmaurice

22 January 2011
14:00

(BP) Loughborough Students	27 - 15	Morley
	Report

Loughborough University Stadium
Attendance: 200
Referee: Nick Williams

22 January 2011
14:00

Westoe	20 - 15	Kendal (BP)
	Report

Wood Terrace
Attendance: 173
Referee: Matthew Daubney

22 January 2011
14:15

Manchester	0 - 36	Preston Grasshoppers (BP)
	Report

Grove Park
Referee: Rob Sheard

22 January 2011
14:30

Rugby Lions	22 - 20	Hull Ionians (BP)
	Report

Webb Ellis Road
Attendance: 192
Referee: Trevor Fisher

22 January 2011
15:00

(BP) Caldy	28 - 21	Nuneaton (BP)
	Report

Paton Field
Attendance: 101
Referee: Wayne Falla

22 January 2011
15:00

(BP) Fylde	35 - 12	Harrogate
	Report

Woodlands Memorial Ground
Attendance: 576
Referee: Shane Lewis

22 January 2011

Huddersfield	P - P	Leicester Lions

- Postponed. Game rescheduled to 21 May 2011.

=== Round 20 ===
29 January 2011
14:00

(BP) Hull	28 - 24	Caldy (BP)
	Report

Ferens Ground
Attendance: 175
Referee: Revis Phillips

29 January 2011
14:00

Leicester Lions	8 - 32	Fylde (BP)
	Report

Westleigh Park
Attendance: 230
Referee: Marcus Caton

29 January 2011
14:00

Nuneaton	18 - 18	Huddersfield
	Report

Liberty Way
Attendance: 183
Referee: Karl Kirkpatrick

29 January 2011
14:15

(BP) Luctonians	26 - 24	Hull Ionians (2BP)
	Report

Mortimer Park
Attendance: 415
Referee: John Owen

29 January 2011

Harrogate	P - P	Westoe

- Postponed. Game rescheduled to 14 May 2011.

29 January 2011

Kendal	P - P	Loughborough Students

- Postponed. Game rescheduled to 7 May 2011.

29 January 2011

Morley	P - P	Manchester

- Postponed. Game rescheduled to 14 May 2011.

29 January 2011

Preston Grasshoppers	C - C	Rugby Lions

- Game would initially be postponed but due to fixture congestion it would ultimately be cancelled due to the result not affecting the overall league table.

=== Round 13 (rescheduled games) ===
5 February 2011
14:00

(BP) Leicester Lions	30 - 25	Morley (BP)
	Report

Westleigh Park
Attendance: 100
Referee: Phil Watters

- Game rescheduled from 27 November 2010.

5 February 2011
14:00

Nuneaton	21 - 14	Preston Grasshoppers (BP)
	Report

Liberty Way
Attendance: 127
Referee: Nick Cockburn

- Game rescheduled from 27 November 2010.

5 February 2011
14:15

Caldy	28 - 27	Rugby Lions (BP)
	Report

Paton Field
Attendance: 133
Referee: Karl Kirkpatrick

- Game rescheduled from 27 November 2010.

5 February 2011
14:15

(BP) Harrogate	24 - 17	Kendal (BP)
	Report

Claro Road
Attendance: 150
Referee: Michael Dickens

- Game rescheduled from 27 November 2010.

5 February 2011
14:15

(BP) Luctonians	19 - 23	Westoe
	Report

Mortimer Park
Attendance: 265
Referee: Shane Lewis

- Game rescheduled from 27 November 2010.

5 February 2011
15:00

(BP) Fylde	29 - 17	Loughborough Students
	Report

Woodlands Memorial Ground
Attendance: 740
Referee: Darren Gamage

- Game rescheduled from 27 November 2010.

5 February 2011
15:00

(BP) Huddersfield	62 - 3	Manchester
	Report

Lockwood Park
Attendance: 171
Referee: Brendan Fitzmaurice

- Game rescheduled from 27 November 2010.

=== Round 21 ===
12 February 2011
13:00

(BP) Loughborough Students	34 - 26	Harrogate (BP)
	Report

Loughborough University Stadium
Attendance: 175
Referee: Johan van Merwe

12 February 2011
14:00

(BP) Westoe	26 - 15	Leicester Lions
	Report

Wood Terrace
Attendance: 106
Referee: Karl Kirkpatrick

12 February 2011
14:00

(BP) Hull Ionians	60 - 21	Preston Grasshoppers
	Report

Brantingham Park
Attendance: 150
Referee: Rob Sheard

12 February 2011
14:15

(BP) Caldy	17 - 20	Luctonians
	Report

Paton Field
Attendance: 201
Referee: John Healy

12 February 2011
14:15

Manchester	21 - 51	Kendal (BP)
	Report

Grove Park
Attendance: 81
Referee: Matthew Daubney

12 February 2011
14:15

(BP) Morley	53 - 10	Rugby Lions
	Report

Scatcherd Lane
Attendance: 250
Referee: D Edmunds

12 February 2011
15:00

(BP) Fylde	33 - 5	Nuneaton
	Report

Woodlands Memorial Ground
Attendance: 515
Referee: Will Halford

12 February 2011
15:00

(BP) Huddersfield	23 - 28	Hull (BP)
	Report

Lockwood Park
Attendance: 241
Referee: Luke Haskins

=== Round 22 ===
19 February 2011
14:00

Hull	9 - 31	Fylde (BP)
	Report

Ferens Ground
Attendance: 200
Referee: Brendan Fitzmaurice

19 February 2011
14:00

(BP) Kendal	40 - 20	Rugby Lions (BP)
	Report

Mint Bridge
Attendance: 250
Referee: Revis Phillips

19 February 2011
14:00

Leicester Lions	16 - 14	Loughborough Students (BP)
	Report

Westleigh Park
Attendance: 100
Referee: S Leyshon

19 February 2011
14:00

Nuneaton	33 - 17	Westoe
	Report

Liberty Way
Attendance: 183
Referee: Rob Warburton

19 February 2011
14:15

(BP) Caldy	44 - 29	Huddersfield
	Report

Paton Field
Attendance: 140
Referee: Rob Sheard

19 February 2011
14:30

(BP) Luctonians	32 - 17	Preston Grasshoppers
	Report

Mortimer Park
Attendance: 464
Referee: Matthew Daubney

19 February 2011

Harrogate	P - P	Manchester

- Postponed. Game rescheduled to 21 May 2011.

19 February 2011

Morley	P - P	Hull Ionians

- Postponed. Game rescheduled to 21 May 2011.

=== Round 14 (rescheduled games) ===
26 February 2011
14:00

(BP) Hull Ionians	25 - 32	Caldy (BP)
	Report

Brantingham Park
Attendance: 200
Referee: Charles Samson

- Game rescheduled from 4 December 2010.

26 February 2011
14:00

Kendal	21 - 20	Leicester Lions (BP)
	Report

Mint Bridge
Attendance: 300
Referee: Wayne Falla

- Game rescheduled from 4 December 2010.

26 February 2011
14:15

(BP) Harrogate	30 - 29	Luctonians (2BP)
	Report

Claro Road
Attendance: 150
Referee: Karl Kirkpatrick

- Game rescheduled from 4 December 2010.

26 February 2011
14:15

Manchester	6 - 92	Fylde (BP)
	Report

Grove Park
Attendance: 133
Referee: Matthew Daubney

- Game rescheduled from 4 December 2010.

26 February 2011
14:15

(BP) Morley	24 - 3	Nuneaton
	Report

Scatcherd Lane
Referee: Chris Sharp

- Game rescheduled from 4 December 2010.

26 February 2011
14:30

Rugby Lions	13 - 28	Huddersfield (BP)
	Report

Webb Ellis Road
Attendance: 156
Referee: Revis Phillips

- Game rescheduled from 4 December 2010.

26 February 2011
14:30

Preston Grasshoppers	18 - 18	Hull
	Report

Lightfoot Green
Attendance: 156
Referee: Revis Phillips

- Game rescheduled from 4 December 2010.

=== Round 23 ===
5 March 2011
14:00

(BP) Hull Ionians	42 - 11	Kendal
	Report

Brantingham Park
Attendance: 200
Referee: Matthew Daubney

5 March 2011
14:15

Manchester	17 - 50	Leicester Lions (BP)
	Report

Grove Park
Attendance: 80
Referee: Revis Phillips

5 March 2011
14:30

Rugby Lions	0 - 25	Harrogate (BP)
	Report

Webb Ellis Road
Attendance: 205
Referee: Rob Warburton

5 March 2011
15:00

(BP) Fylde	55 - 29	Caldy (BP)
	Report

Woodlands Memorial Ground
Attendance: 827
Referee: Chris Sharp

5 March 2011
15:00

Huddersfield	24 - 15	Luctonians
	Report

Lockwood Park
Attendance: 167
Referee: D Edmunds

5 March 2011
15:00

Preston Grasshoppers	30 - 17	Morley
	Report

Lightfoot Green
Attendance: 204
Referee: Tom Foley

5 March 2011
15:00

(BP) Westoe	31 - 19	Hull
	Report

Wood Terrace
Attendance: 186
Referee: Andrew Vertigan

5 March 2011

Loughborough Students	P - P	Nuneaton

- Postponed. Game rescheduled to 14 May 2011.

=== Round 24 ===
12 March 2011
14:00

(BP) Hull	23 - 29	Loughborough Students (BP)
	Report

Ferens Ground
Attendance: 120
Referee: Rob Warburton

12 March 2011
14:00

(BP) Leicester Lions	57 - 7	Rugby Lions
	Report

Westleigh Park
Attendance: 147
Referee: Tom Davis

12 March 2011
14:00

(BP) Nuneaton	60 - 0	Manchester
	Report

Liberty Way
Attendance: 144
Referee: Nick Cockburn

12 March 2011
14:15

(BP) Caldy	41 - 39	Westoe (2BP)
	Report

Paton Field
Attendance: 121
Referee: Nick Williams

12 March 2011
15:00

Harrogate	25 - 25	Hull Ionians
	Report

Claro Road
Attendance: 150

12 March 2011
15:00

(BP) Huddersfield	18 - 25	Fylde
	Report

Lockwood Park
Attendance: 285
Referee: Mike Cooper

12 March 2011
15:00

Kendal	11 - 10	Preston Grasshoppers (BP)
	Report

Mint Bridge
Attendance: 400
Referee: Rob Sheard

12 March 2011
15:00

(BP) Luctonians	20 - 23	Morley
	Report

Mortimer Park
Attendance: 425
Referee: Wayne Falla

=== Rounds 15 & 16 (rescheduled games) ===
19 March 2011
14:00

(BP) Hull	35 - 31	Morley (2BP)
	Report

Ferens Ground
Attendance: 120
Referee: Karl Kirkpatrick

- Game rescheduled from 11 December 2010.

19 March 2011
14:00

Hull Ionians	16 - 30	Westoe
	Report

Brantingham Park
Attendance: 200
Referee: Wayne Falla

- Game rescheduled from 18 December 2010.

19 March 2011
14:00

(BP) Kendal	21 - 25	Caldy
	Report

Mint Bridge
Attendance: 300
Referee: Brendan Fitzmaurice

- Game rescheduled from 18 December 2010.

19 March 2011
14:00

(BP) Leicester Lions	37 - 15	Nuneaton
	Report

Westleigh Park
Attendance: 200
Referee: S Bradford

- Game rescheduled from 18 December 2010.

19 March 2011
14:15

(BP) Luctonians	42 - 0	Manchester
	Report

Mortimer Park

- Game rescheduled from 18 December 2010.

19 March 2011
14:30

Rugby Lions	5 - 71	Loughborough Students
	Report

Webb Ellis Road
Attendance: 144
Referee: D Edmunds

- Game rescheduled from 18 December 2010.

19 March 2011
15:00

(BP) Preston Grasshoppers	20 - 27	Fylde
	Report

Lightfoot Green
Attendance: 670
Referee: Philip Davis

- Game rescheduled from 18 December 2010.

=== Round 25 ===
25 March 2011
19:30

Rugby Lions	17 - 35	Nuneaton (BP)
	Report

Webb Ellis Road
Attendance: 280
Referee: Mike Cooper

26 March 2011
14:00

Loughborough Students	28 - 21	Caldy (BP)
	Report

Loughborough University Stadium
Attendance: 200
Referee: Andrew Vertigan

26 March 2011
14:15

(BP) Manchester	5 - 54	Hull (BP)
	Report

Grove Park
Attendance: 246
Referee: Paul Knowles

26 March 2011
15:00

(BP) Fylde	34 - 29	Luctonians (2BP)
	Report

Woodlands Memorial Ground
Attendance: 780
Referee: John Meredith

26 March 2011
15:00

Hull Ionians	25 - 24	Leicester Lions (BP)
	Report

Brantingham Park
Attendance: 200
Referee: Brendan Fitzmaurice

26 March 2011
15:00

(BP) Morley	26 - 36	Kendal
	Report

Scatcherd Lane
Attendance: 200

26 March 2011
15:00

(2BP) Preston Grasshoppers	28 - 29	Harrogate (BP)
	Report

Lightfoot Green
Attendance: 214
Referee: Filippo Bertelli

26 March 2011
15:00

Westoe	20 - 14	Huddersfield (BP)
	Report

Wood Terrace
Attendance: 172
Referee: Karl Kirkpatrick

=== Round 26 ===
2 April 2011
14:00

(BP) Leicester Lions	45 - 29	Preston Grasshoppers (BP)
	Report

Westleigh Park
Attendance: 121
Referee: Wayne Falla

2 April 2011
14:00

(BP) Nuneaton	37 - 14	Hull Ionians
	Report

Liberty Way
Attendance: 238
Referee: Marcus Caton

2 April 2011
15:00

(BP) Caldy	104 - 3	Manchester
	Report

Paton Field
Attendance: 211
Referee: Mark Liddell

2 April 2011
15:00

(BP) Fylde	53 - 24	Westoe (BP)
	Report

Woodlands Memorial Ground
Attendance: 952
Referee: Greg MacDonald

2 April 2011
15:00

(BP) Harrogate	37 - 19	Morley
	Report

Claro Road
Attendance: 250
Referee: Brendan Fitzmaurice

2 April 2011
15:00

Huddersfield	13 - 10	Loughborough Students (BP)
	Report

Lockwood Park
Attendance: 300
Referee: Matthew Daubney

2 April 2011
15:00

(BP) Hull	39 - 0	Rugby Lions
	Report

Ferens Ground
Attendance: 150
Referee: John Owen

2 April 2011
15:00

(BP) Luctonians	22 - 29	Kendal
	Report

Mortimer Park
Attendance: 312
Referee: D Edmunds

=== Round 27 ===
9 April 2011
14:00

(BP) Loughborough Students	44 - 22	Fylde
	Report

Loughborough University Stadium
Attendance: 250
Referee: Andrew Taylorson

9 April 2011
14:30

Rugby Lions	3 - 69	Caldy (BP)
	Report

Webb Ellis Road
Attendance: 146
Referee: Rob Warburton

9 April 2011
15:00

Hull Ionians	22 - 22	Hull
	Report

Brantingham Park
Attendance: 400
Referee: K White

9 April 2011
15:00

(BP) Kendal	42 - 26	Harrogate (BP)
	Report

Mint Bridge
Attendance: 310
Referee: Karl Kirkpatrick

9 April 2011
15:00

Manchester	20 - 101	Huddersfield (BP)
	Report

Grove Park
Attendance: 98
Referee: Guy Steel Bodger

9 April 2011
15:00

Morley	14 - 47	Leicester Lions (BP)
	Report

Scatcherd Lane
Referee: Mark Liddell

9 April 2011
15:00

(BP) Preston Grasshoppers	22 - 24	Nuneaton
	Report

Lightfoot Green
Attendance: 167
Referee: Paul Kimber

9 April 2011
15:00

(BP) Westoe	48 - 24	Luctonians
	Report

Wood Terrace
Attendance: 147

=== Round 28 ===
16 April 2011
14:00

(BP) Leicester Lions	40 - 34	Kendal (2BP)
	Report

Westleigh Park
Referee: Tom Davis

16 April 2011
14:00

Nuneaton	28 - 22	Morley (2BP)
	Report

Liberty Way
Attendance: 275
Referee: Philip Davis

16 April 2011
15:00

(BP) Caldy	63 - 21	Hull Ionians
	Report

Paton Field
Attendance: 119
Referee: Nick Williams

16 April 2011
15:00

(BP) Fylde	118 - 0	Manchester
	Report

Woodlands Memorial Ground
Attendance: 950
Referee: D Edmunds

16 April 2011
15:00

(BP) Huddersfield	71 - 24	Rugby Lions (BP)
	Report

Lockwood Park
Attendance: 211
Referee: Luke Haskins

16 April 2011
15:00

(BP) Hull	38 - 21	Preston Grasshoppers
	Report

Ferens Ground
Attendance: 150
Referee: Will Halford

16 April 2011
15:00

(BP) Luctonians	31 - 48	Harrogate (BP)
	Report

Mortimer Park
Attendance: 456
Referee: Fergus Kirby

16 April 2011
15:00

Westoe	22 - 40	Loughborough Students (BP)
	Report

Wood Terrace
Attendance: 451
Referee: Andrew Jackson

=== Round 29 ===
23 April 2011
14:00

Hull Ionians	7 - 30	Huddersfield
	Report

Brantingham Park
Attendance: 200
Referee: Steve Lee

23 April 2011
14:00

Loughborough Students	17 - 14	Luctonians (BP)
	Report

Loughborough University Stadium
Attendance: 175
Referee: Ross Campbell

23 April 2011
14:30

(BP) Rugby Lions	30 - 44	Fylde (BP)
	Report

Webb Ellis Road
Attendance: 164
Referee: Mark Liddell

23 April 2011
15:00

Harrogate	14 - 29	Leicester Lions (BP)
	Report

Claro Road
Attendance: 200
Referee: Karl Kirkpatrick

23 April 2011
15:00

(BP) Kendal	33 - 24	Nuneaton (BP)
	Report

Mint Bridge
Attendance: 400
Referee: Marcus Caton

23 April 2011
15:00

Manchester	10 - 67	Westoe (BP)
	Report

Grove Park
Attendance: 112
Referee: Will Halford

23 April 2011
15:00

(BP) Morley	37 - 36	Hull (2BP)
	Report

Scatcherd Lane
Attendance: 250
Referee: Andrew Vertigan

23 April 2011
15:00

Preston Grasshoppers	14 - 40	Caldy (BP)
	Report

Lightfoot Green
Attendance: 126
Referee: D Edmunds

=== Round 30 ===
30 April 2011
15:00

(2BP) Caldy	28 - 29	Morley
	Report

Paton Field
Attendance: 391
Referee: Karl Kirkpatrick

30 April 2011
15:00

(BP) Fylde	76 - 14	Hull Ionians
	Report

Woodlands Memorial Ground
Attendance: 1,033
Referee: Wayne Falla

30 April 2011
15:00

Huddersfield	25 - 21	Preston Grasshoppers (BP)
	Report

Lockwood Park
Attendance: 390
Referee: Shane Lewis

30 April 2011
15:00

(BP) Hull	22 - 17	Kendal (BP)
	Report

Ferens Ground
Attendance: 200
Referee: Will Halford

30 April 2011
15:00

(BP) Leicester Lions	35 - 30	Luctonians (BP)
	Report

Westleigh Park
Attendance: 137
Referee: Andrew Vertigan

30 April 2011
15:00

(BP) Loughborough Students	92 - 0	Manchester
	Report

Loughborough University Stadium
Attendance: 165
Referee: Matthew Daubney

30 April 2011
15:00

(BP) Nuneaton	40 - 17	Harrogate
	Report

Liberty Way
Referee: Richard Phillips

30 April 2011
15:00

(BP) Westoe	102 - 3	Rugby Lions
	Report

Wood Terrace
Attendance: 143
Referee: Fergus Kirby

=== Rounds 16 & 20 (rescheduled games) ===
7 May 2011
14:15

(BP) Harrogate	32 - 22	Hull (BP)
	Report

Claro Road
Referee: Fergus Kirby

- Game rescheduled from 18 December 2010.

7 May 2011
15:00

Kendal	6 - 30	Loughborough Students
	Report

Mint Bridge
Attendance: 400
Referee: Philip Davis

- Game rescheduled from 29 January 2011.

7 May 2011
15:00

Morley	18 - 15	Huddersfield (BP)
	Report

Scatcherd Lane
Attendance: 250
Referee: Marcus Caton

- Game rescheduled from 18 December 2010.

=== Rounds 17, 20 & 23 (rescheduled games) ===
14 May 2011
15:00

Harrogate	14 - 38	Westoe (BP)
	Report

Claro Road
Attendance: 250
Referee: Darren Gamage

- Game rescheduled from 29 January 2011.

14 May 2011
15:00

(BP) Huddersfield	35 - 14	Kendal
	Report

Lockwood Park
Referee: Matthew Daubney

- Game rescheduled from 8 January 2010.

14 May 2011
15:00

(BP) Loughborough Students	36 - 3	Nuneaton
	Report

Loughborough University Stadium
Attendance: 350
Referee: Marcus Caton

- Game rescheduled from 5 March 2011.

14 May 2011
15:00

(BP) Morley	81 - 0	Manchester
	Report

Scatcherd Lane
Attendance: 200
Referee: Fergus Kirby

- Game rescheduled from 29 January 2011.

=== Rounds 14, 19 & 22 (rescheduled games) ===
21 May 2011
15:00

(BP) Harrogate	55 - 17	Manchester
	Report

Claro Road
Attendance: 280
Referee: Andy Rawson

- Game rescheduled from 19 February 2011.

21 May 2011
15:00

Huddersfield	19 - 38	Leicester Lions (BP)
	Report

Lockwood Park
Attendance: 194
Referee: Andrew Taylorson

- Game rescheduled from 22 January 2011.

21 May 2011
15:00

(BP) Loughborough Students	31 - 12	Westoe
	Report

Loughborough University Stadium
Attendance: 300
Referee: Steve Lee

- Game rescheduled from 4 December 2010.

21 May 2011
15:00

(BP) Morley	25 - 27	Hull Ionians (BP)
	Report

Scatcherd Lane
Referee: Andrew Jackson

- Game rescheduled from 19 February 2011.

=== Promotion play-off ===
Each season, the runners-up in the National League 2 North and National League 2 South participate in a play-off for promotion into National League 1. Jersey were runners-up in the South and would host the game as they had a better record in the league in comparison to the North runners up Loughborough Students.

28 May 2011
15:00

Jersey	30 - 5	Loughborough Students

St Peter
Attendance: 3,100

== Total season attendances ==
Club	Home Games	Total	Average	Highest	Lowest	% Capacity
Caldy	15	3,169	211	391	101	5%
Fylde	15	13,819	921	2,415	389	12%
Harrogate	14 (Note: Missing home attendance v Hull on 7 May 2011.)	3,093	221	320	150	5%
Huddersfield	14 (Note: Missing home attendance v Kendal on 14 May 2011.)	3,353	240	390	50	16%
Hull	15	2,820	188	500	120	13%
Hull Ionians	15	3,300	220	400	150	15%
Kendal	15	4,798	320	650	182	7%
Leicester Lions	13 (Note: Missing home attendances v Westoe on 16 October 2010 and Kendal on 16 April 2011.)	1,635	126	230	100	6%
Loughborough Students	14 (Note: Missing home attendance v Kendal on 9 October 2010.)	3,015	215	350	100	7%
Luctonians	13 (Note: Missing home attendances v Leicester Lions on 4 September 2010 and Manchester on 19 March 2011.)	5,034	387	647	200	15%
Manchester	14 (Note: Missing home attendance v Preston Grasshoppers on 22 January 2011.)	1,949	139	246	80	3%
Morley	12 (Note: Missing home attendances v Nuneaton on 26 February 2011, Leicester Lions on 9 April 2011 and Hull Ionians on 21 May 2011.)	2,650	221	250	200	4%
Nuneaton	14 (Note: Missing home attendance v Harrogate 30 April 2011.)	2,772	198	475	127	5%
Preston Grasshoppers	14 (Note: Only played 14 home games due to fixture cancellation.)	3,583	256	670	126	11%
Rugby Lions	15	2,976	198	280	144	5%
Westoe	14 (Note: Missing home attendance v Manchester on 11 December 2010.)	2,664	190	451	106	

== Individual statistics ==
- Note that points scorers includes tries as well as conversions, penalties and drop goals.

=== Top points scorers ===
Rank	Player	Team	Appearances	Points
1	(England) Chris Johnson	Huddersfield	27	387
2	(England) Richard Vasey	Caldy	28	323
3	(England) Mark Ireland	Kendal	30	319
4	(England) Jon Boden	Leicester Lions	29	283
5	(England) John Morris	Luctonians	27	272
6	(England) Mark Bedworth	Westoe	28	271
7	(England) Simon Bradshaw	Morley	24	228
8	(England) James Cameron	Hull	22	222
9	(England) George Drake	Loughborough Students	26	209
10	(England) Mike Waywell	Fylde	27	193

=== Top try scorers ===
Rank	Player	Team	Appearances	Tries
1	(England) Gareth Collins	Leicester Lions	29	32
2	(England) Oliver Brennand	Fylde	24	29
3	(England) Jamie Broadley	Harrogate	25	28
4	(England) Nick Royle	Fylde	18	24
4	(England) Gavin Roberts	Caldy	28	24
5	(England) Craig Holland	Loughborough Students	20	23
5	(England) Mike MacFarlane	Loughborough Students	28	23
6	(England) Craig Ross	Caldy	24	20
6	(England) Mike Waywell	Fylde	27	20
6	(England) Craig Field	Morley	28	20

== Season records ==
=== Team ===
Largest home win — 118 pts

118 - 0 Fylde at home to Manchester on 16 April 2011

Largest away win — 86 pts

92 - 6 Fylde away to Manchester on 26 February 2011

Most points scored — 118 pts

118 - 0 Fylde at home to Manchester on 16 April 2011

Most tries in a match — 18

Fylde at home to Manchester on 16 April 2011

Most conversions in a match — 14

Fylde at home to Manchester on 16 April 2011

Most penalties in a match — 6

Caldy at home to Preston Grasshoppers on 11 December 2010

Most drop goals in a match — 2 (x2)

Nuneaton at home to Leicester Lions on 11 September 2010
Preston Grasshoppers at home to Hull Ionians on 16 October 2010

=== Player ===
Most points in a match — 37

(England) Gavin Roberts for Caldy at home to Manchester on 2 April 2011

Most tries in a match — 6

(England) Gareth Collins for Leicester Lions at home to Hull Ionians on 13 November 2010

Most conversions in a match — 14

(England) Stephen Collins for Fylde at home to Manchester on 16 April 2011

Most penalties in a match — 6

(England) Richard Vasey for Caldy at home to Preston Grasshoppers on 11 December 2010

Most drop goals in a match — 2 (x2)

(England) Lee Chapman for Nuneaton at home to Leicester Lions on 11 September 2010
(England) Mark Edwards for Preston Grasshoppers at home to Hull Ionians on 16 October 2010

=== Attendances ===
Highest — 2,415

Fylde at home to Preston Grasshoppers on 11 September 2010

Lowest — 50

Huddersfield at home to Hull Ionians on 11 December 2010

Highest Average Attendance — 921

Fylde

Lowest Average Attendance — 126

Leicester Lions

== See also ==
- English Rugby Union Leagues
- English rugby union system
- Rugby union in England
