= Gareth Collins =

English-Welsh rugby union player (born 1983)

- Born: 20 September 1983 (age 43) Rugby, Warwickshire, England
- School: Lawrence Sheriff School

Rugby union career
- Position(s): Full back, Centre, Wing
- Current team: Leicester Lions
Senior career
Years	Team	Apps	(Points)
2002–03	Barkers Butts	7	(0)
2003–05	Rugby Lions	43	(90)
2005–14	Leicester Lions	213	(730)
2014–	Melton Mowbray		
- Correct as of 26 April 2014
International career
Years	Team	Apps	(Points)
2009–11	England Counties XV	7	(20)
- Correct as of 8 June 2011

Gareth Collins (born 1983) is a former English-Welsh rugby union player who is currently head coach at Leicester Lions and Head of Psychology at The King's School Grantham. A Leicester Tigers youth player, Collins was a versatile back who made his name scoring tries, being one of the most prolific finishers in National League 2 North history with 152 tries scored during his time with Rugby Lions and Leicester Lions, which included a joint divisional record 32 tries in a season. As well as playing club rugby he has also represented Warwickshire in the county championships and has captained the England Counties XV.

== Career ==
=== Early career ===
Born to an English mother and Welsh father, Collins grew up in Rugby, Warwickshire and attended Lawrence Sheriff School. While at school he played rugby for Warwickshire under-16s as well as playing junior rugby for Rugby Lions and English Premiership giants, Leicester Tigers. By virtue of his Welsh heritage he also played rugby union for the Welsh Exiles and hockey for Wales at under-16 level. Collins played three seasons of youth rugby at Leicester Tigers but was unable to break into the senior squad, instead returning his other youth side, Rugby Lions in 2003, after a short spell with Midlands regional side, Barkers Butts. Back in the 2002–03 season Rugby Lions were playing in the second division (then known as National Division 1) and the young Collins had to wait until March for his debut, a 12 – 56 defeat away to Plymouth Albion. Collins played 2 more games in what was a very difficult debut season as Rugby failed to win a single game and were relegated to National Division 2.

The 2003–04 started better for Rugby Lions as they were competitive in National 2 and Collins started to become a first team regular, playing 18 games and scoring 6 tries in the league. Although performances were improved on the previous year, Rugby lost out in a very close relegation battle with Rosslyn Park, going down in 13th place on the last day of the season after losing 35–50 at home to champions Sedgley Park (a game Collins missed), while Rosslyn Park managed to stay up by 1 point after winning their fixture. The 2004–05 season saw Rugby Lions in National Division 3 North and as with the previous year they were competitive in the league, with Collins continuing to play regularly and bettered his try record from the previous season by grabbing 8 in the league. Unfortunately for Rugby they were deducted 5 points in December due to fielding too many oversea players and this would cost them at the end of the season as they were relegated for the third successive year. The club's 49 points meant that they went down in 12th spot just 2 points behind relegation rivals, Cleckheaton – if it had not been for the points deducted then they would have stayed up.

=== Leicester Lions ===
After a disastrous third relegation with Rugby, Collins left in the summer of 2005 to join another Lions side – this time with the Leicester Lions who had just been promoted into National Division 3 North. The 2005–06 season saw Collins play and score regularly for his new side, getting 12 tries and helping them to a 12th-place finish in the league. Despite being well clear of the relegation zone, Collins and Lions could be thankful to the RFU who had designated just two relegation spots that season – if they had not then it would have been four relegation's in a row for Collins! The next couple of seasons saw Leicester Lions consolidate their place in National Division 3 North with 7th and 4th-placed finishes, Collins playing and scoring regularly. The 2008–09 season would be an excellent one for Collins as he started to discover serious try scoring form. Despite the Lions not building on their 4th-place finish of the previous year and dropping back down to 7th, Collins finished as the divisions top try scorer with 29 tries from 26 league appearances – including getting six tries in a match (twice) against first Bradford & Bingley and then Halifax.

Such deadly form saw him picked for Warwickshire for the 2009 County Championship, although he could not help his county stay in Division 1 and they were relegated at the end of the competition having failed to win any games in their northern pool. Despite disappointment in county competition, Collins was called up by England Counties XV to take part in their summer tour of South Korea and Japan – the only player from tier 4 to be included. He did not play in the Counties record 108–10 win over a Korea presidents XV but started the second game, scoring a try on his international debut as his team beat East Japan 67 – 31 in Tokyo on 8 June in what would be his only game of the tour.

The 2009–10 season saw Leicester Lions finish 6th in the newly rebranded National League 2 North. Although Collins was not as prolific as the previous year he still managed 18 tries and was recalled by England Counties to take part in their summer tour of Canada. He featured in two of the three games on tour including a 20 – 6 win against The Rock and a 46 – 7 win over British Columbia Bears. The 2010–11 season was the most successful of both Collins and Leicester Lions to date. Collins managed to once more finish as the division's top try scorer with a tier 4 (north) record breaking 32 tries (since equalled by Ryan Parkinson in the 2013–14 season), while his team just missed out on a promotion playoff spot, 2 points adrift of second place, Loughborough Lions – the highest league position in the Lions history. In March 2011 Collins captained the England Counties XV for the first time, scoring a try as his side lost 8 – 16 to an Irish Club XV at the match played Anglesea Road in Dublin. Although he missed county action with Warwickshire his rugby continued into the summer, captaining England Counties for their tour of Spain. He played three games on a very successful tour, scoring two tries including one in the 55 – 6 victory against Spain in the final game.

After the dizzy heights of 2011 there came a fall as Leicester Lions struggled in the league, just managing to avoid relegation with a 13th-placed finish, 1 point clear of 14th placed Harrogate who actually had more wins. In a struggling team, Collins found tries harder to come by than in recent seasons, although the 13 he got went some way to ensuring the Lions stayed up. It was also the first time in three years in which Collins did not experience England Counties XV rugby, freeing him up for Warwickshire who took part in the County Championship Plate at the end of the season. He scored 2 tries in a 39–37 victory over Eastern Counties but this was not enough as Warwickshire would go on to finish second in their pool, missing out on a chance of promotion to Division 1.

The following season was better for Leicester Lions as they would finish higher up in the table in 9th with Collins grabbing 12 tries but it was the beginning of the end of his time at the club. During the pre-season Collins injured his knee. He took part in the opening league game against Dudley Kinswinford but had to go off in the first half after re-injuring his knee. This injury would result in him missing the whole of the 2013–14 season. After nine seasons at Leicester Lions, five of which he had been captain, Collins had played his last game for the club.

=== Head coach at Melton Mowbray ===
In September 2014 after a year out due to injury and knee reconstruction surgery, Collins became the head coach at Melton Mowbray. He had prior coaching experience with The King's School at Grantham, as well as currently coaching the Leicestershire under-20s, but this was his first senior coaching role. He took over a Melton Mowbray team which had just been relegated into Midlands 3 East (North) – the lowest level of Midlands regional rugby.

His first season coaching was a great success as Melton Mowbray dominated Midlands 3 East (North), going undefeated in the league all season to take the title and claim promotion back to their former league. They also won a double by clinching the RFU Midlands Vase with an emphatic 46 – 5 victory away to Vipers in March 2015. Winning the Midlands section of the RFU Vase meant going through to the national semi-finals in April, where despite home advantage, Melton Mowbray lost 22 – 33 against northern winners, West Leeds, ending the hopes of appearing at the Twickenham final.

A second promotion would follow the next season as Melton Mowbray claimed the Midlands 2 East (South) title with a win over Vipers to go up to Midlands 1 East. Melton would also claim another double – this time defeating Hinckley 20–18 at Welford Road in Leicester to win the Leicestershire Cup for the first time ever in the club's history.

== Season-by-season playing stats ==
=== Club ===
Season	Club	Competition	Appearances	Tries	Drop Goals	Conversions	Penalties	Total Points
2002–03	Barkers Butts	Midlands Division 1	7	0	0	0	0	0
2002–03	Rugby Lions	National Division 1	3	0	0	0	0	0
2003–04	Rugby Lions	National Division 2	18	6	0	0	0	30
2003–04	Rugby Lions	Powergen Cup	2	2	0	0	0	10
2004–05	Rugby Lions	National Division 3 North	18	8	0	0	0	40
2004–05	Rugby Lions	Powergen Cup	2	2	0	0	0	10
2005–06	Leicester Lions	National Division 3 North	23	14	0	0	0	70
2005–06	Leicester Lions	Powergen National Trophy	1	0	0	0	0	0
2006–07	Leicester Lions	National Division 3 North	21	10	0	0	0	50
2007–08	Leicester Lions	National Division 3 North	24	16	0	0	0	80
2007–08	Leicester Lions	EDF National Trophy	1	1	0	0	0	5
2008–09	Leicester Lions	National Division 3 North	26	29	0	0	0	145
2009–10	Leicester Lions	National League 2 North	29	18	0	0	0	90
2010–11	Leicester Lions	National League 2 North	29	32	0	0	0	160
2011–12	Leicester Lions	National League 2 North	30	13	0	1	0	67
2012–13	Leicester Lions	National League 2 North	28	12	0	0	1	63
2013–14	Leicester Lions	National League 2 North	1	0	0	0	0	0
2014–15	Melton Mowbray	Midlands 3 East (North)	?	?	?	?	?	?
2015–16	Melton Mowbray	Midlands 2 East (South)	?	?	?	?	?	?
2016–17	Melton Mowbray	Midlands 1 East	?	?	?	?	?	?

=== County/Representative ===
Season	Side	Competition	Appearances	Tries	Drop Goals	Conversions	Penalties	Total Points
2008–09	Warwickshire	County Championship	2 (Note: During the 2009 County Championships Collins played at least 2 games but team details for Warwickshire's final game against Yorkshire are unclear with the Coventry Telegraph press article stating that Warwickshire were depleted by injuries.)	0	0	0	0	0
2008–09	England Counties XV	Tour of Korea and Japan	1	1	0	0	0	5
2009–10	England Counties XV	Tour of Canada	2	0	0	0	0	0
2010–11	England Counties XV	Test match	1	1	0	0	0	5
2010–11	England Counties XV	Tour of Spain	3	2	0	0	0	10
2011–12	Warwickshire	County Championship Plate	1 (Note: During the 2012 County Championship Plate Collins played at least one game but team details for Warwickshire's first game against Durham are unclear.)	2	0	0	0	10

== Honours and records ==
=== Playing ===
National League 2 North

- Tier 4 (North) most tries in a season: 32 (tied with Ryan Parkinson)

Leicester Lions

- National League 2 North top try scorer (2): 2008–09 (29 tries), 2010–11 (32 tries)

England Counties XV

- Selected for tour of Korea: 2009
- Selected for tour of Canada: 2010
- Selected and made captain for tour of Spain: 2011

Warwickshire

- Capped by Warwickshire senior county team

Other

- Capped by Welsh Exiles

=== Coaching ===
Melton Mowbray

- Midlands 3 East (North) champions: 2014–15
- RFU Midlands Vase winners: 2015
- Midlands 2 East (South) champions: 2015–16
- Leicestershire Cup winners: 2016, 2017
