= Hong Kong Premiership (rugby union) =

Hong Kong rugby championship

- Current season, competition or edition: 2025–26 Hong Kong Premiership
- Sport: Rugby union
- Founded: 2001; 25 years ago
- CEO: James Farndon
- Administrator: HKRU
- No. of teams: 6
- Country: Hong Kong
- Most recent champion: Hong Kong FC (12th title) (2025–2026)
- Most titles: Hong Kong FC (12 titles)
- Broadcasters: Cluch TV (former); YouTube
- Level on pyramid: 1

The Hong Kong Premiership currently branded as the Nan Fung Group | AIRSIDE Hong Kong Premiership, is the top-tier domestic rugby union competition for rugby union clubs in Hong Kong, organized by the Hong Kong Rugby Union.

The season usually runs from October to March and combines a regular league campaign with end of season playoffs.Teams play a regular league season first, then the top four move into the Grand Championship playoffs. In the men's competition, the regular season lasts 15 rounds. The team who finishes first in the table becomes the League Winner, while the playoff winner becomes the Premiership champion, often called the Grand Champions.

The competition has been played since 2001, and has evolved into the current Premiership system. The current champions are HKFC, who won the league in 2026.

== Teams ==
Hong Kong Premiership clubs
Club	Established	District	Stadium	Capacity	Titles (Last)
HKU Sandy Bay RFC	1990	Southern District, Hong Kong	Aberdeen Sports Ground	9,000	2 (2025)
Hong Kong Scottish RFC	2011	Sham Shui Po	Shek Kip Mei Park	1,440	
Hong Kong FC	1886	Happy Valley	Hong Kong Football Club Stadium	2,750	12 (2026)
Kowloon RFC	1976	Kowloon City	King's Park	3,000	1 (2016)
USRC Tigers RFC	1978	Kowloon City	King's Park	3,000	
Valley RFC	1975	Happy Valley	Happy Valley Racecourse	2,000	7 (2018)

== Most Grand championships ==
1. Hong Kong FC
  12 Titles
2. Valley RFC
  8 Titles
3. HKU Sandy Bay RFC
  2 Titles
4. Kowloon RFC
  1 Titles

== Grand Champions year by year ==
- 2001 – Hong Kong FC
- 2002 – Hong Kong FC
- 2003 – Hong Kong FC
- 2004 – Hong Kong FC
- 2005 – Hong Kong FC
- 2006 – Hong Kong FC
- 2007 – Hong Kong FC
- 2008 – Hong Kong FC
- 2009 – Hong Kong FC
- 2010 – Valley RFC
- 2011 – Valley RFC
- 2012 – Valley RFC
- 2013 – Valley RFC
- 2014 – Valley RFC
- 2015 – Valley RFC
- 2016 – Kowloon RFC
- 2017 – Valley RFC
- 2018 – Valley RFC
- 2019 – HKU Sandy Bay RFC
- 2020 – No champion due to COVID-19
- 2021 – No champion due to COVID-19
- 2022 – No champion due to COVID-19
- 2023 – Hong Kong FC
- 2024 – Hong Kong FC
- 2025 – HKU Sandy Bay RFC
- 2026 – Hong Kong FC

== See also ==
- Rugby union in Hong Kong
