= 2009–10 National League 2 North =

Rugby union competition in England

- Countries: England
- Champions: Macclesfield
- Runners-up: Loughborough Students
- Relegated: Waterloo, Bradford & Bingley, Broadstreet
- Attendance: 55,958 (average 247 per match) (Note: Note that 13 home attendances are missing (see below) - so the total attendance will not be 100% accurate. The average attendance has also been taken into account with the missing games not included.)
- Highest attendance: 735; Fylde v Preston Grasshoppers; 6 February 2010
- Lowest attendance: 100 (multiple teams)
- Top point scorer: (England) Ross Winney (Macclesfield); 422 points
- Top try scorer: (England) Paul Arnold (Caldy); 27 tries

The 2009–10 National League 2 North was the first season (twenty-third overall) of the fourth tier (north) of the English domestic rugby union competitions since the professionalised format of the second division was introduced. Previously known as National Division 3 North, it had been renamed due to widespread changes to the league system by the RFU with National One becoming the Championship, National 2 becoming National 1 and so on. The league system was 4 points for a win, 2 points for a draw and additional bonus points being awarded for scoring 4 or more tries and/or losing within 7 points of the victorious team. In terms of promotion the league champions would go straight up into National League 1 while the runners up would have a one-game playoff against the runners up from National League 2 South (at the home ground of the club with the superior league record) for the final promotion place. A further change to the league system would see the division increase from 14 to 16 teams.

After finishing 3rd the previous season, Macclesfield would go two places better by winning the league title in what was a very close contest with runners up Loughborough Students - Macclesfield clinching the championship by benefit of just 3 points (one more win). Loughborough Students would fail to join Macclesfield in the 2010–11 National League 1 as they lost their playoff at home to the 2009–10 National League 2 South runners up Rosslyn Park. At the other end of the table, Waterloo suffered their 3rd successive relegation as the worst side in the division, followed at later dates by the more competitive Bradford & Bingley and newly promoted Broadstreet. Waterloo and Bradford & Bingley would drop to National League 3 North while Broadstreet would fall back down to the National League 3 Midlands.

== Participating teams and locations ==
Eleven of the teams listed below participated in the 2008–09 National Division Three North season; Waterloo were relegated from the 2008–09 National Division Two, while Broadstreet would come up as champions of Midlands Division 1 along with Westoe (champions) and Hull (playoffs) from North Division 1. A further move saw that Rugby Lions were level transferred (again) across from the National League 2 South as the most northerly team in that division after promotion and relegation left the two leagues unbalanced (in the end there would still be an imbalance as Mounts Bay's liquidation meant there would only be 15 teams in the 2009–10 National League 2 South compared to 16 in National League 2 North).

Locations of the 2009-10 National League 2 North teams

Team	Stadium	Capacity	City/Area
Bradford & Bingley	Wagon Lane	4,000	Bingley, West Yorkshire
Broadstreet	Ivor Preece Field	1,500 (250 seats)	Coventry, West Midlands
Caldy	Paton Field	4,000	Thurstaston, Wirral, Merseyside
Fylde	Woodlands Memorial Ground	7,500 (500 seats)	Lytham St. Annes, Lancashire
Harrogate	Claro Road	4,500 (500 seats)	Harrogate, North Yorkshire
Huddersfield	Lockwood Park	1,500 (500 seats)	Huddersfield, West Yorkshire
Hull	Ferens Ground	1,500 (288 seats)	Kingston upon Hull, East Riding of Yorkshire
Hull Ionians	Brantingham Park	1,500 (240 seats)	Brantingham, East Riding of Yorkshire
Kendal	Mint Bridge	4,600 (600 seats)	Kendal, Cumbria
Leicester Lions	Westleigh Park	2,000	Blaby, Leicestershire
Loughborough Students	Loughborough University Stadium	3,000	Loughborough, Leicestershire
Macclesfield	Priory Park	1,250 (250 seats)	Macclesfield, Cheshire
Preston Grasshoppers	Lightfoot Green	2,250 (250 seats)	Preston, Lancashire
Rugby Lions	Webb Ellis Road	4,000 (200 seats)	Rugby, Warwickshire
Waterloo	St Anthony's Road	9,950 (950 seats)	Blundellsands, Merseyside
Westoe	Wood Terrace		South Shields, Tyne and Wear

== Final league table ==
2009–10 National League 2 North table
Pos	Team	Pld	W	D	L	PF	PA	PD	TB	LB	Pts	Qualification
1	Macclesfield (C)	30	27	0	3	1137	405	+732	20	2	130	Promoted
2	Loughborough Students	30	26	0	4	968	448	+520	21	2	127	Promotion play-off
3	Caldy	30	26	0	4	984	492	+492	18	3	125	
4	Harrogate	30	20	2	8	717	579	+138	15	3	102	
5	Hull	30	17	1	12	646	717	−71	10	1	81	
6	Leicester Lions	30	14	1	15	823	571	+252	12	7	77	
7	Westoe (Note: Westoe's game away to Preston Grasshoppers would be cancelled.)	29	14	0	15	690	780	−90	15	5	76	
8	Rugby Lions	30	13	0	17	665	641	+24	13	7	72	
9	Fylde	30	13	1	16	685	722	−37	11	6	71	
10	Kendal	30	13	1	16	626	802	−176	5	4	63	
11	Huddersfield (Note: Hudderfield's game at home to Hull Ionians would be cancelled.)	29	11	1	17	696	613	+83	7	5	58	
12	Hull Ionians (Note: Hull Ionian's game away to Huddersfield would be cancelled.)	29	11	0	18	557	667	−110	4	6	54	
13	Preston Grasshoppers (Note: Preston Grasshopper's game at home to Westoe would be cancelled.)	29	10	2	17	509	793	−284	6	4	54	
14	Broadstreet (R)	30	7	1	22	567	870	−303	7	7	44	Relegated
15	Bradford & Bingley (R)	30	7	1	22	555	945	−390	8	5	43	Relegated
16	Waterloo (R)	30	3	1	26	434	1214	−780	3	1	18	Relegated

Updated to match(es) played on 08-05-2010. Source: Rugby Statbunker
(C) Champion; (R) Relegated

== Results ==
=== Round 1 ===
5 September 2009

(BP) Broadstreet	37 - 15	Bradford & Bingley
	Report

Ivor Preece Field
Attendance: 300
Referee: Matthew Daubney

5 September 2009

(BP) Caldy	38 - 15	Westoe
	Report

Paton Field
Attendance: 184
Referee: Mike Read

5 September 2009

(BP) Harrogate	27 - 21	Rugby Lions (BP)
	Report

Claro Road
Referee: Nick Ashton

5 September 2009

Hull	31 - 25	Fylde (2BP)
	Report

Ferens Ground
Attendance: 200
Referee: Ian Tennant

5 September 2009

(BP) Kendal	37 - 33	Leicester Lions (2BP)
	Report

Mint Bridge
Attendance: 420
Referee: D Edmunds

5 September 2009

(BP) Loughborough Students	23 - 22	Macclesfield (BP)
	Report

Loughborough University Stadium
Attendance: 200
Referee: Marcus Caton

5 September 2009

(BP) Preston Grasshoppers	30 - 29	Hull Ionians (2BP)
	Report

Lightfoot Green
Attendance: 294
Referee: Andrew Jackson

5 September 2009

Waterloo	21 - 41	Huddersfield (BP)
	Report

St Anthony's Road
Attendance: 200
Referee: Nick Cockburn

=== Round 2 ===
12 September 2009

(BP) Bradford & Bingley	37 - 37	Waterloo (BP)
	Report

Wagon Lane
Attendance: 200
Referee: Andrew Vertigan

12 September 2009

Caldy	17 - 32	Huddersfield
	Report

Paton Field
Attendance: 211
Referee: Clare Daniels

12 September 2009

Fylde	20 - 20	Kendal
	Report

Woodlands Memorial Ground
Attendance: 407
Referee: Rob Sheard

12 September 2009

Hull Ionians	31 - 48	Hull (BP)
	Report

Brantingham Park
Attendance: 500
Referee: Andrew Taylorson

12 September 2009

(BP) Leicester Lions	25 - 27	Broadstreet
	Report

Westleigh Park
Attendance: 150
Referee: Andrew McMenemy

12 September 2009

(BP) Macclesfield	35 - 28	Preston Grasshoppers (BP)
	Report

Priory Park
Attendance: 228
Referee: Matthew Daubney

12 September 2009

(BP) Rugby Lions	27 - 39	Loughborough Students (BP)
	Report

Webb Ellis Road
Attendance: 282
Referee: David Walker

12 September 2009

Westoe	14 - 29	Harrogate (BP)
	Report

Wood Terrace

=== Round 3 ===
19 September 2009

Broadstreet	9 - 39	Fylde (BP)
	Report

Ivor Preece Field
Attendance: 190
Referee: Andrew Jackson

19 September 2009

Harrogate	3 - 19	Caldy
	Report

Claro Road
Attendance: 220
Referee: Mark Wilson

19 September 2009

(BP) Huddersfield	60 - 0	Bradford & Bingley
	Report

Lockwood Park
Attendance: 225
Referee: Mike Read

19 September 2009

Hull	19 - 44	Macclesfield (BP)
	Report

Ferens Ground
Attendance: 150
Referee: Brendan Fitzmaurice

19 September 2009

(BP) Kendal	44 - 12	Hull Ionians
	Report

Mint Bridge
Attendance: 484
Referee: Mark Liddell

19 September 2009

(BP) Loughborough Students	16 - 22	Westoe
	Report

Loughborough University Stadium
Attendance: 120
Referee: John Meredith

19 September 2009

Preston Grasshoppers	17 - 32	Rugby Lions (BP)
	Report

Lightfoot Green
Referee: Revis Phillips

19 September 2009

Waterloo	7 - 36	Leicester Lions (BP)
	Report

St Anthony's Road
Attendance: 595
Referee: Simon Harding

=== Round 4 ===
26 September 2009

(BP) Caldy	45 - 7	Bradford & Bingley
	Report

Paton Field
Attendance: 201
Referee: Nick Ashton

26 September 2009

(BP) Fylde	43 - 31	Waterloo (BP)
	Report

Woodlands Memorial Ground
Attendance: 575
Referee: Brendan Fitzmaurice

26 September 2009

Harrogate	12 - 25	Loughborough Students (BP)
	Report

Claro Road
Attendance: 198
Referee: Mike Read

26 September 2009

Hull Ionians	22 - 50	Broadstreet (BP)
	Report

Brantingham Park
Attendance: 250
Referee: D Edmunds

26 September 2009

Leicester Lions	23 - 15	Huddersfield
	Report

Westleigh Park
Attendance: 150
Referee: Andrew Bickle

26 September 2009

Macclesfield	27 - 6	Kendal
	Report

Priory Park
Attendance: 255
Referee: Trevor Fisher

26 September 2009

(BP) Rugby Lions	35 - 3	Hull
	Report

Webb Ellis Road
Attendance: 235
Referee: Simon Harding

26 September 2009

(2BP) Westoe	31 - 32	Preston Grasshoppers (BP)
	Report

Wood Terrace
Referee: Rob Sheard

=== Round 5 ===
3 October 2009

(BP) Bradford & Bingley	30 - 22	Leicester Lions
	Report

Wagon Lane
Attendance: 100
Referee: Lee Towers

3 October 2009

Broadstreet	13 - 34	Macclesfield (BP)
	Report

Ivor Preece Field
Attendance: 155
Referee: Stefano Roscini

3 October 2009

Huddersfield	22 - 15	Fylde (BP)
	Report

Lockwood Park
Attendance: 257
Referee: Andrew Vertigan

2 October 2009

(BP) Hull	18 - 25	Westoe
	Report

Ferens Ground
Attendance: 200

3 October 2009

Kendal	6 - 36	Rugby Lions (BP)
	Report

Mint Bridge
Attendance: 388
Referee: Andrew Jackson

3 October 2009

Loughborough Students	8 - 36	Caldy (BP)
	Report

Loughborough University Stadium
Attendance: 200
Referee: Rob Sheard

3 October 2009

(BP) Preston Grasshoppers	31 - 31	Harrogate (BP)
	Report

Lightfoot Green
Attendance: 176
Referee: D Edmunds

3 October 2009

Waterloo	17 - 12	Hull Ionians (BP)
	Report

St Anthony's Road
Attendance: 348
Referee: Revis Phillips

=== Round 6 ===
9 October 2009

Rugby Lions	0 - 12	Broadstreet
	Report

Webb Ellis Road
Attendance: 533
Referee: Marcus Caton

10 October 2009

(BP) Caldy	34 - 21	Leicester Lions
	Report

Paton Field
Attendance: 261
Referee: Stuart Parker

10 October 2009

(BP) Fylde	39 - 25	Bradford & Bingley
	Report

Woodlands Memorial Ground
Attendance: 454
Referee: Mike Read

10 October 2009

(BP) Harrogate	57 - 11	Hull
	Report

Claro Road
Attendance: 300
Referee: D Edmunds

10 October 2009

(BP) Hull Ionians	30 - 13	Huddersfield
	Report

Brantingham Park
Attendance: 250
Referee: Rob Sheard

10 October 2009

(BP) Loughborough Students	29 - 8	Preston Grasshoppers
	Report

Loughborough University Stadium
Attendance: 250
Referee: Clare Daniels

10 October 2009

(BP) Macclesfield	55 - 14	Waterloo
	Report

Priory Park
Referee: Andrew Bickle

10 October 2009

(BP) Westoe	33 - 17	Kendal
	Report

Wood Terrace
Attendance: 200

=== Round 7 ===
17 October 2009

Bradford & Bingley	13 - 28	Hull Ionians
	Report

Wagon Lane
Attendance: 150
Referee: Steve Penfold

17 October 2009

(BP) Broadstreet	38 - 31	Westoe (2BP)
	Report

Ivor Preece Field
Attendance: 250
Referee: Tom Davis

17 October 2009

Huddersfield	10 - 20	Macclesfield
	Report

Lockwood Park
Attendance: 270
Referee: Steve Lee

17 October 2009

Hull	11 - 28	Loughborough Students (BP)
	Report

Ferens Ground
Attendance: 130
Referee: Revis Phillips

17 October 2009

Kendal	13 - 12	Harrogate (BP)
	Report

Mint Bridge
Attendance: 487
Referee: Brendan Fitzmaurice

17 October 2009

(BP) Leicester Lions	35 - 3	Fylde
	Report

Westleigh Park
Attendance: 150
Referee: Ian Tempest

17 October 2009

Preston Grasshoppers	15 - 50	Caldy (BP)
	Report

Lightfoot Green
Attendance: 357
Referee: James Fisher

17 October 2009

Waterloo	10 - 24	Rugby Lions
	Report

St Anthony's Road
Attendance: 385
Referee: Lee Towers

=== Round 8 ===
24 October 2009

(BP) Caldy	21 - 27	Fylde
	Report

Paton Field
Attendance: 300
Referee: Chris Sharp

24 October 2009

(BP) Harrogate	32 - 20	Broadstreet
	Report

Claro Road
Attendance: 173
Referee: Revis Phillips

24 October 2009

Hull Ionians	15 - 25	Leicester Lions (BP)
	Report

Brantingham Park
Attendance: 250
Referee: J Matthews

24 October 2009

(BP) Loughborough Students	34 - 3	Kendal
	Report

Loughborough University Stadium
Attendance: 250
Referee: Mark Jackson

24 October 2009

(BP) Macclesfield	53 - 3	Bradford & Bingley
	Report

Priory Park
Attendance: 203
Referee: Rob Sheard

24 October 2009

(BP) Preston Grasshoppers	24 - 0	Hull
	Report

Lightfoot Green
Attendance: 203
Referee: Andrew Jackson

24 October 2009

(BP) Rugby Lions	34 - 27	Huddersfield (BP)
	Report

Webb Ellis Road
Referee: Will Halford

24 October 2009

(BP) Westoe	30 - 17	Waterloo
	Report

Wood Terrace

=== Round 9 ===
31 October 2009

(BP) Bradford & Bingley	20 - 27	Rugby Lions (BP)
	Report

Wagon Lane
Attendance: 175
Referee: Brendan Fitzmaurice

31 October 2009

Broadstreet	0 - 60	Loughborough Students (BP)
	Report

Ivor Preece Field
Attendance: 239
Referee: John Meredith

31 October 2009

(BP) Fylde	35 - 9	Hull Ionians
	Report

Woodlands Memorial Ground
Attendance: 382
Referee: Matthew Daubney

31 October 2009

Huddersfield	20 - 28	Westoe (BP)
	Report

Lockwood Park
Attendance: 243
Referee: D Edmunds

31 October 2009

Hull	29 - 41	Caldy (BP)
	Report

Ferens Ground
Attendance: 185
Referee: Andrew Vertigan

31 October 2009

(BP) Kendal	20 - 27	Preston Grasshoppers (BP)
	Report

Mint Bridge
Attendance: 458
Referee: Guy Steel Bodger

31 October 2009

Leicester Lions	22 - 7	Macclesfield
	Report

Westleigh Park
Attendance: 116
Referee: Mark Jackson

31 October 2009

Waterloo	10 - 36	Harrogate (BP)
	Report

St Anthony's Road
Attendance: 331
Referee: Trevor Fisher

=== Round 10 ===
7 November 2009

Broadstreet	10 - 10	Preston Grasshoppers
	Report

Ivor Preece Field
Attendance: 150
Referee: Matt Carley

7 November 2009

(BP) Caldy	34 - 23	Hull Ionians
	Report

Paton Field
Attendance: 230
Referee: D Edmunds

7 November 2009

(BP) Harrogate	22 - 20	Huddersfield (BP)
	Report

Claro Road
Attendance: 190
Referee: Brendan Fitzmaurice

7 November 2009

Hull	8 - 28	Kendal
	Report

Ferens Ground
Attendance: 100

7 November 2009

(BP) Loughborough Students	74 - 19	Waterloo
	Report

Loughborough University Stadium
Attendance: 250
Referee: Steve Penfold

7 November 2009

(BP) Macclesfield	33 - 10	Fylde
	Report

Priory Park
Attendance: 295
Referee: Andrew Vertigan

7 November 2009

Rugby Lions	14 - 25	Leicester Lions
	Report

Webb Ellis Road
Attendance: 228
Referee: Revis Phillips

7 November 2009

(BP) Westoe	38 - 16	Bradford & Bingley
	Report

Wood Terrace
Attendance: 200
Referee: Matthew Daubney

=== Round 11 ===
14 November 2009

(BP) Bradford & Bingley	18 - 22	Harrogate (BP)
	Report

Wagon Lane
Attendance: 247
Referee: Adam Friend

14 November 2009

(BP) Broadstreet	20 - 22	Hull
	Report

Ivor Preece Field
Referee: Stuart Turnbull

14 November 2009

Fylde	12 - 10	Rugby Lions (BP)
	Report

Woodlands Memorial Ground
Attendance: 385
Referee: Andrew Jackson

14 November 2009

Huddersfield	3 - 15	Loughborough Students
	Report

Lockwood Park
Attendance: 275
Referee: Brendan Fitzmaurice

14 November 2009

(BP) Hull Ionians	21 - 22	Macclesfield
	Report

Brantingham Park
Attendance: 150
Referee: Andrew Vertigan

14 November 2009

(BP) Kendal	14 - 15	Caldy
	Report

Mint Bridge
Attendance: 430
Referee: Trevor Fisher

14 November 2009

(BP) Leicester Lions	46 - 5	Westoe
	Report

Westleigh Park
Attendance: 150
Referee: Mike Cooper

14 November 2009

Waterloo	17 - 38	Preston Grasshoppers (BP)
	Report

St Anthony's Road
Attendance: 408
Referee: Will Halford

=== Round 12 ===
28 November 2009

(BP) Caldy	11 - 16	Macclesfield
	Report

Paton Field
Attendance: 239
Referee: Mark Wilson

28 November 2009

Harrogate	10 - 10	Leicester Lions
	Report

Claro Road
Attendance: 160
Referee: Nick Cockburn

28 November 2009

(BP) Hull	29 - 13	Waterloo
	Report

Ferens Ground
Attendance: 250
Referee: Matthew Daubney

28 November 2009

Kendal	30 - 5	Broadstreet
	Report

Mint Bridge
Attendance: 334
Referee: John Meredith

28 November 2009

(BP) Loughborough Students	52 - 13	Bradford & Bingley
	Report

Loughborough University Stadium
Attendance: 150
Referee: Simon Harding

28 November 2009

Preston Grasshoppers	17 - 11	Huddersfield (BP)
	Report

Lightfoot Green
Attendance: 245
Referee: Mark Liddell

28 November 2009

(BP) Rugby Lions	7 - 8	Hull Ionians
	Report

Webb Ellis Road
Attendance: 213
Referee: Tom Davis

28 November 2009

(BP) Westoe	43 - 21	Fylde
	Report

Wood Terrace
Attendance: 250
Referee: Rob Sheard

=== Round 13 ===
5 December 2009

(BP) Bradford & Bingley	28 - 18	Preston Grasshoppers
	Report

Wagon Lane
Attendance: 196
Referee: D Edmunds

5 December 2009

Broadstreet	13 - 38	Caldy (BP)
	Report

Ivor Preece Field
Attendance: 250
Referee: Tom Davis

5 December 2009

Fylde	21 - 15	Harrogate (BP)
	Report

Woodlands Memorial Ground
Attendance: 447
Referee: Nick Ashton

5 December 2009

Huddersfield	9 - 17	Hull
	Report

Lockwood Park
Attendance: 273
Referee: Trevor Fisher

5 December 2009

Hull Ionians	33 - 17	Westoe
	Report

Brantingham Park
Attendance: 200
Referee: Lee Towers

5 December 2009

Leicester Lions	9 - 18	Loughborough Students
	Report

Westleigh Park
Attendance: 250
Referee: Richard Parker-Sedgmore

5 December 2009

Macclesfield	23 - 14	Rugby Lions
	Report

Priory Park
Attendance: 203
Referee: John Meredith

5 December 2009

(BP) Waterloo	12 - 18	Kendal
	Report

St Anthony's Road
Attendance: 350
Referee: John Owen

=== Round 14 ===
12 December 2009

(2BP) Broadstreet	26 - 28	Waterloo
	Report

Ivor Preece Field
Attendance: 180
Referee: Matthew Daubney

12 December 2009

Caldy	17 - 11	Rugby Lions (BP)
	Report

Paton Field
Attendance: 161
Referee: Andrew Jackson

12 December 2009

Harrogate	19 - 5	Hull Ionians
	Report

Claro Road
Attendance: 125
Referee: Clare Daniels

12 December 2009

(BP) Hull	30 - 0	Bradford & Bingley
	Report

Ferens Ground
Attendance: 120
Referee: Richard Kelly

12 December 2009

Kendal	25 - 17	Huddersfield
	Report

Mint Bridge
Attendance: 360
Referee: Andrew Taylorson

12 December 2009

(BP) Loughborough Students	43 - 0	Fylde
	Report

Loughborough University Stadium
Attendance: 150
Referee: Darren Gamage

12 December 2009

Preston Grasshoppers	20 - 10	Leicester Lions
	Report

Lightfoot Green
Attendance: 332

12 December 2009

(BP) Westoe	28 - 38	Macclesfield (BP)
	Report

Wood Terrace
Attendance: 200
Referee: Brendan Fitzmaurice

=== Round 15 ===
19 December 2009

Bradford & Bingley	P - P	Kendal

- Postponed. Game rescheduled to 6 February 2010.

19 December 2009

Fylde	P - P	Preston Grasshoppers

- Postponed. Game rescheduled to 6 February 2010.

19 December 2009

Huddersfield	P - P	Broadstreet

- Postponed. Game rescheduled to 6 February 2010.

19 December 2009

Hull Ionians	P - P	Loughborough Students

- Postponed. Game rescheduled to 6 February 2010.

19 December 2009

Leicester Lions	P - P	Hull

- Postponed. Game rescheduled to 6 February 2010.

19 December 2009

Macclesfield	P - P	Harrogate

- Postponed. Game rescheduled to 6 February 2010.

19 December 2009

Rugby Lions	P - P	Westoe

- Postponed. Game rescheduled to 6 February 2010.

19 December 2009

Waterloo	P - P	Caldy

- Postponed. Game rescheduled to 6 February 2010.

=== Round 16 ===
2 January 2010

(BP) Hull	27 - 7	Hull Ionians
	Report

Ferens Ground
Attendance: 400
Referee: Marcus Caton

2 January 2010

(BP) Loughborough Students	42 -3	Rugby Lions
	Report

Loughborough University Stadium
Attendance: 100
Referee: Matt Carley

2 January 2010

Waterloo	8 - 17	Bradford & Bingley
	Report

St Anthony's Road
Attendance: 260
Referee: Matthew Daubney

2 January 2010

Broadstreet	P - P	Leicester Lions

- Postponed. Game rescheduled to 20 March 2010.

2 January 2010

Harrogate	P - P	Westoe

- Postponed. Game rescheduled to 20 March 2010.

2 January 2010

Huddersfield	P - P	Caldy

- Postponed. Game rescheduled to 20 March 2010.

2 January 2010

Kendal	P - P	Fylde

- Postponed. Game rescheduled to 20 March 2010.

2 January 2010

Preston Grasshoppers	P - P	Macclesfield

- Postponed. Game rescheduled to 29 April 2010.

=== Round 17 ===
9 January 2010

Bradford & Bingley	P - P	Huddersfield

- Postponed. Game rescheduled to 1 May 2010.

9 January 2010

Caldy	P - P	Harrogate

- Postponed. Game rescheduled to 1 May 2010.

9 January 2010

Fylde	P - P	Broadstreet

- Postponed. Game rescheduled to 1 May 2010.

9 January 2010

Hull Ionians	P - P	Kendal

- Postponed. Game rescheduled to 1 May 2010.

9 January 2010

Leicester Lions	P - P	Waterloo

- Postponed. Game rescheduled to 1 May 2010.

9 January 2010

Macclesfield	P - P	Hull

- Postponed. Game rescheduled to 1 May 2010.

9 January 2010

Rugby Lions	P - P	Preston Grasshoppers

- Postponed. Game rescheduled to 1 May 2010.

9 January 2010

Westoe	P - P	Loughborough Students

- Postponed. Game rescheduled to 5 May 2010.

=== Round 18 ===
16 January 2010

(BP) Broadstreet	12 - 16	Hull Ionians
	Report

Ivor Preece Field
Attendance: 215
Referee: Brendan Fitzmaurice

16 January 2010

Hull	20 - 5	Rugby Lions
	Report

Ferens Ground
Attendance: 150
Referee: Nick Cockburn

16 January 2010

Loughborough Students	25 - 13	Harrogate
	Report

Loughborough University Stadium
Attendance: 150
Referee: John Meredith

16 January 2010

Bradford & Bingley	P - P	Caldy

- Postponed. Game rescheduled to 8 May 2010.

16 January 2010

Huddersfield	P - P	Leicester Lions

- Postponed. Game rescheduled to 8 May 2010.

16 January 2010

Kendal	P - P	Macclesfield

- Postponed. Game rescheduled to 8 May 2010.

16 January 2010

Preston Grasshoppers	P - P	Westoe

- Postponed. Game rescheduled to 15 May 2010.

16 January 2010

Waterloo	P - P	Fylde

- Postponed. Game rescheduled to 8 May 2010.

=== Round 19 ===
23 January 2010

Caldy	20 - 17	Loughborough Students (BP)
	Report

Paton Field
Attendance: 402
Referee: Steve Lee

23 January 2010

Fylde	24 - 14	Huddersfield
	Report

Woodlands Memorial Ground
Attendance: 387
Referee: Guy Steel Bodger

23 January 2010

Harrogate	12 - 9	Preston Grasshoppers (BP)
	Report

Claro Road
Attendance: 210
Referee: Mark Jackson

23 January 2010

(BP) Hull Ionians	50 - 14	Waterloo
	Report

Brantingham Park
Attendance: 250
Referee: D Edmunds

23 January 2010

(BP) Leicester Lions	41 - 23	Bradford & Bingley
	Report

Westleigh Park
Attendance: 125
Referee: Rob Sheard

23 January 2010

(BP) Macclesfield	58 - 6	Broadstreet
	Report

Priory Park
Attendance: 144
Referee: Andrew Vertigan

23 January 2010

Rugby Lions	25 - 11	Kendal
	Report

Webb Ellis Road
Attendance: 202

23 January 2010

(BP) Westoe	19 - 23	Hull
	Report

Wood Terrace
Attendance: 100

=== Round 20 ===
29 January 2010

Broadstreet	14 - 28	Rugby Lions
	Report

Ivor Preece Field
Attendance: 500
Referee: Ross Campbell

30 January 2010

Bradford & Bingley	13 - 28	Fylde (BP)
	Report

Wagon Lane
Attendance: 235
Referee: Karl Kirkpatrick

30 January 2010

Hull	23 - 12	Harrogate
	Report

Ferens Ground
Attendance: 175
Referee: Matt Carley

30 January 2010

(BP) Kendal	46 - 10	Westoe
	Report

Mint Bridge
Attendance: 415
Referee: Mark Liddell

30 January 2010

(BP) Leicester Lions	13 - 14	Caldy
	Report

Westleigh Park
Attendance: 125
Referee: Ed Turnill

30 January 2010

Waterloo	14 - 104	Macclesfield (BP)
	Report

St Anthony's Road
Attendance: 217
Referee: Trevor Fisher

30 January 2010

Huddersfield	P - P	Hull Ionians

- Postponed. Game rescheduled to 15 May 2010.

30 January 2010

Preston Grasshoppers	P - P	Loughborough Students

- Postponed. Game rescheduled to 8 May 2010.

=== Round 15 (rescheduled games) ===
6 February 2010

Bradford & Bingley	14 - 23	Kendal
	Report

Wagon Lane
Attendance: 195
Referee: Revis Phillips

- Game rescheduled from 19 December 2009.

6 February 2010

(BP) Fylde	32 - 10	Preston Grasshoppers
	Report

Woodlands Memorial Ground
Attendance: 735
Referee: Steve Lee

- Game rescheduled from 19 December 2009.

6 February 2010

(BP) Huddersfield	42 - 0	Broadstreet
	Report

Lockwood Park
Attendance: 173
Referee: John Meredith

- Game rescheduled from 19 December 2009.

6 February 2010

Hull Ionians	15 - 33	Loughborough Students (BP)
	Report

Brantingham Park
Attendance: 250
Referee: Greg MacDonald

- Game rescheduled from 19 December 2009.

6 February 2010

(BP) Leicester Lions	30 - 15	Hull
	Report

Westleigh Park
Attendance: 100
Referee: Mark Jackson

- Game rescheduled from 19 December 2009.

6 February 2010

(BP) Macclesfield	61 - 5	Harrogate
	Report

Priory Park
Attendance: 218
Referee: Philip Davis

- Game rescheduled from 19 December 2009.

6 February 2010

(BP) Rugby Lions	34 - 22	Westoe
	Report

Webb Ellis Road
Attendance: 160
Referee: D Edmunds

- Game rescheduled from 19 December 2009.

6 February 2010

Waterloo	10 - 40	Caldy (BP)
	Report

St Anthony's Road
Attendance: 348
Referee: Rob Sheard

- Game rescheduled from 19 December 2009.

=== Round 21 ===
13 February 2010

(BP) Caldy	33 - 10	Preston Grasshoppers
	Report

Paton Field
Attendance: 211
Referee: Ian Tempest

13 February 2010

(BP) Fylde	34 - 20	Leicester Lions
	Report

Woodlands Memorial Ground
Attendance: 295
Referee: Simon Harding

13 February 2010

Harrogate	28 - 21	Kendal (BP)
	Report

Claro Road
Attendance: 170
Referee: Matthew Daubney

13 February 2010

(BP) Hull Ionians	11 - 14	Bradford & Bingley
	Report

Brantingham Park
Attendance: 300
Referee: Guy Steel Bodger

13 February 2010

(BP) Loughborough Students	41 - 17	Hull
	Report

Loughborough University Stadium
Attendance: 150
Referee: Karl Kirkpatrick

13 February 2010

(BP) Macclesfield	41 - 5	Huddersfield
	Report

Priory Park
Attendance: 225
Referee: Mark Liddell

13 February 2010

(BP) Rugby Lions	43 - 3	Waterloo
	Report

Webb Ellis Road
Attendance: 238
Referee: Paul Kimber

13 February 2010

Westoe	22 - 16	Broadstreet (BP)
	Report

Wood Terrace
Attendance: 175
Referee: Revis Phillips

=== Round 22 ===
20 February 2010

Bradford & Bingley	7 - 36	Macclesfield (BP)
	Report

Wagon Lane
Attendance: 275
Referee: Andrew Jackson

20 February 2010

(BP) Fylde	25 - 28	Caldy
	Report

Woodlands Memorial Ground
Attendance: 475
Referee: D Edmunds

20 February 2010

Huddersfield	23 - 16	Rugby Lions (BP)
	Report

Lockwood Park
Attendance: 303
Referee: Brendan Fitzmaurice

20 February 2010

(BP) Hull	24 - 19	Preston Grasshoppers (BP)
	Report

Ferens Ground
Attendance: 200
Referee: Revis Phillips

20 February 2010

Kendal	17 - 43	Loughborough Students (BP)
	Report

Mint Bridge
Attendance: 482
Referee: Trevor Fisher

20 February 2010

(BP) Leicester Lions	7 - 14	Hull Ionians
	Report

Westleigh Park
Attendance: 100

20 February 2010

Waterloo	13 - 33	Westoe (BP)
	Report

St Anthony's Road
Attendance: 250
Referee: Mark Liddell

20 February 2010

Broadstreet	P - P	Harrogate

- Postponed. Game rescheduled for 8 May 2010.

=== Round 23 ===
27 February 2010

(BP) Caldy	36 - 12	Hull
	Report

Paton Field
Attendance: 123
Referee: Brendan Fitzmaurice

27 February 2010

(BP) Harrogate	48 - 12	Waterloo
	Report

Claro Road
Referee: Matt Carley

27 February 2010

Hull Ionians	27 - 17	Fylde
	Report

Brantingham Park
Attendance: 200
Referee: Greg MacDonald

27 February 2010

(BP) Loughborough Students	24 - 8	Broadstreet
	Report

Loughborough University Stadium
Attendance: 100
Referee: D Edmunds

27 February 2010

Macclesfield	27 - 15	Leicester Lions
	Report

Priory Park
Attendance: 197
Referee: Andrew Vertigan

27 February 2010

(BP) Preston Grasshoppers	18 - 25	Kendal
	Report

Lightfoot Green
Attendance: 326
Referee: Andrew Jackson

27 February 2010

(BP) Rugby Lions	37 - 31	Bradford & Bingley (2BP)
	Report

Webb Ellis Road
Attendance: 197
Referee: Rob Sheard

27 February 2010

Westoe	25 - 10	Huddersfield
	Report

Wood Terrace
Attendance: 127
Referee: Trevor Fisher

=== Round 24 ===
6 March 2010

(BP) Bradford & Bingley	37 - 8	Westoe
	Report

Wagon Lane
Attendance: 170
Referee: Brendan Fitzmaurice

6 March 2010

Fylde	7 - 37	Macclesfield (BP)
	Report

Woodlands Memorial Ground
Attendance: 375
Referee: Chris Sharp

6 March 2010

(BP) Huddersfield	19 - 25	Harrogate
	Report

Lockwood Park
Attendance: 176
Referee: Steve Penfold

6 March 2010

Hull Ionians	25 - 41	Caldy (BP)
	Report

Brantingham Park
Attendance: 250
Referee: Wayne Falla

6 March 2010

Kendal	7 - 25	Hull (BP)
	Report

Mint Bridge
Attendance: 340
Referee: D Edmunds

6 March 2010

(BP) Leicester Lions	45 - 24	Rugby Lions (BP)
	Report

Westleigh Park
Attendance: 150

6 March 2010

Preston Grasshoppers	22 - 17	Broadstreet (BP)
	Report

Lightfoot Green
Attendance: 247
Referee: Revis Phillips

6 March 2010

Waterloo	7 - 48	Loughborough Students (BP)
	Report

St Anthony's Road
Attendance: 368
Referee: Andrew Jackson

=== Round 25 ===
13 March 2010

(BP) Caldy	61 - 6	Kendal
	Report

Paton Field
Attendance: 271
Referee: Andrew Jackson

13 March 2010

(BP) Harrogate	41 - 7	Bradford & Bingley
	Report

Claro Road
Attendance: 220
Referee: Nick Cockburn

13 March 2010

(BP) Hull	40 - 22	Broadstreet
	Report

Ferens Ground
Attendance: 150
Referee: Matt Carley

13 March 2010

(BP) Loughborough Students	29 - 18	Huddersfield
	Report

Loughborough University Stadium
Attendance: 150
Referee: Guy Steel Bodger

13 March 2010

(BP) Macclesfield	34 - 0	Hull Ionians
	Report

Priory Park
Attendance: 237
Referee: Richard Parker-Sedgmore

13 March 2010

Preston Grasshoppers	20 - 12	Waterloo
	Report

Lightfoot Green
Attendance: 214
Referee: Rob Sheard

13 March 2010

Rugby Lions	18 - 13	Fylde (BP)
	Report

Webb Ellis Road
Attendance: 162
Referee: Paul Kimber

13 March 2010

(BP) Westoe	20 - 17	Leicester Lions (BP)
	Report

Wood Terrace
Attendance: 143
Referee: Simon Harding

=== Round 16 (rescheduled games) ===
20 March 2010

Broadstreet	16 - 3	Leicester Lions
	Report

Ivor Preece Field
Attendance: 200
Referee: Philip Davis

- Game rescheduled from 2 January 2010.

20 March 2010

Harrogate	19 - 17	Westoe (BP)
	Report

Claro Road
Attendance: 210
Referee: Matthew Daubney

- Game rescheduled from 2 January 2010.

20 March 2010

Huddersfield	15 - 36	Caldy (BP)
	Report

Lockwood Park
Attendance: 169
Referee: Andrew Jackson

- Game rescheduled from 2 January 2010.

20 March 2010

Kendal	29 - 16	Fylde
	Report

Mint Bridge
Attendance: 523
Referee: Revis Phillips

- Game rescheduled from 2 January 2010.

=== Round 26 ===
27 March 2010

Bradford & Bingley	18 - 38	Loughborough Students (BP)
	Report

Wagon Lane
Attendance: 225
Referee: Andrew Vertigan

27 March 2010

(BP) Broadstreet	37 - 45	Kendal (BP)
	Report

Ivor Preece Field
Attendance: 400
Referee: Richard Parker-Sedgmore (Eng)

27 March 2010

(BP) Fylde	20 - 24	Westoe
	Report

Woodlands Memorial Ground
Attendance: 217
Referee: Cemmy Rudkin

27 March 2010

(BP) Huddersfield	50 - 5	Preston Grasshoppers
	Report

Lockwood Park

27 March 2010

Hull Ionians	19 - 10	Rugby Lions
	Report

Brantingham Park
Attendance: 150
Referee: Andrew Jackson

27 March 2010

(BP) Leicester Lions	27 - 34	Harrogate (BP)
	Report

Westleigh Park
Attendance: 100
Referee: Wayne Falla

27 March 2010

Macclesfield	15 - 13	Caldy (BP)
	Report

Priory Park
Attendance: 287
Referee: Ed Turnill

27 March 2010

Waterloo	13 - 27	Hull (BP)
	Report

St Anthony's Road
Attendance: 304
Referee: Rob Sheard

=== Round 27 ===
3 April 2010

(BP) Caldy	36 - 5	Broadstreet
	Report

Paton Field
Attendance: 143
Referee: Mark Liddell

3 April 2010

(BP) Harrogate	34 - 15	Fylde
	Report

Claro Road
Attendance: 180
Referee: Brendan Fitzmaurice

3 April 2010

Hull	20 - 20	Huddersfield
	Report

Ferens Ground
Attendance: 150
Referee: Guy Steel Bodger

3 April 2010

(BP) Kendal	37 - 8	Waterloo
	Report

Mint Bridge
Attendance: 475
Referee: D Edmunds

3 April 2010

Loughborough Students	24 - 17	Leicester Lions (BP)
	Report

Loughborough University Stadium
Attendance: 100
Referee: Paul Kimber

3 April 2010

Preston Grasshoppers	30 - 22	Bradford & Bingley
	Report

Lightfoot Green
Attendance: 163
Referee: Trevor Fisher

3 April 2010

Rugby Lions	13 - 43	Macclesfield (BP)
	Report

Webb Ellis Road
Attendance: 211
Referee: Marcus Caton

3 April 2010

(BP) Westoe	26 - 3	Hull Ionians
	Report

Wood Terrace
Attendance: 150
Referee: Revis Phillips

=== Round 28 ===
10 April 2010

(2BP) Bradford & Bingley	24 - 31	Hull (BP)
	Report

Wagon Lane
Attendance: 190
Referee: D Edmunds

10 April 2010

(2BP) Fylde	32 - 39	Loughborough Students (BP)
	Report

Woodlands Memorial Ground
Attendance: 265
Referee: Andrew Vertigan

10 April 2010

(BP) Huddersfield	45 - 23	Kendal
	Report

Lockwood Park
Attendance: 250
Referee: Rob Sheard

10 April 2010

(BP) Hull Ionians	17 - 19	Harrogate
	Report

Brantingham Park
Attendance: 200

10 April 2010

(BP) Leicester Lions	49 - 15	Preston Grasshoppers
	Report

Westleigh Park
Attendance: 150
Referee: Karl Kirkpatrick

10 April 2010

(BP) Macclesfield	58 - 21	Westoe
	Report

Priory Park
Attendance: 211
Referee: Trevor Fisher

10 April 2010

(BP) Rugby Lions	25 - 27	Caldy
	Report

Webb Ellis Road
Attendance: 181
Referee: Mark Liddell

10 April 2010

Waterloo	0 - 53	Broadstreet (BP)
	Report

St Anthony's Road
Attendance: 270
Referee: Matthew Daubney

=== Round 29 ===
17 April 2010

(BP) Broadstreet	22 - 26	Huddersfield (BP)
	Report

Ivor Preece Field
Attendance: 200
Referee: Ross Campbell

17 April 2010

(BP) Caldy	80 - 7	Waterloo
	Report

Paton Field
Attendance: 350
Referee: Ian Tempest

17 April 2010

(BP) Harrogate	25 - 24	Macclesfield (2BP)
	Report

Claro Road
Attendance: 205
Referee: D Edmunds

17 April 2010

Hull	24 - 17	Leicester Lions (BP)
	Report

Ferens Ground
Attendance: 150
Referee: Andrew Jackson

17 April 2010

(BP) Kendal	17 - 18	Bradford & Bingley
	Report

Mint Bridge
Attendance: 372
Referee: Matthew Daubney

17 April 2010

(BP) Loughborough Students	26 - 23	Hull Ionians (BP)
	Report

Loughborough University Stadium
Attendance: 150
Referee: Mark Liddell

17 April 2010

Preston Grasshoppers	10 - 38	Fylde (BP)
	Report

Lightfoot Green
Attendance: 473
Referee: Revis Phillips

17 April 2010

(BP) Westoe	38 - 35	Rugby Lions (2BP)
	Report

Wood Terrace
Attendance: 162
Referee: Brendan Fitzmaurice

=== Round 30 ===
24 April 2010

(BP) Bradford & Bingley	47 - 34	Broadstreet (BP)
	Report

Wagon Lane
Attendance: 230
Referee: Paul Kimber

24 April 2010

Fylde	16 - 25	Hull
	Report

Woodlands Memorial Ground
Attendance: 310
Referee: Trevor Fisher

24 April 2010

(BP) Huddersfield	60 - 19	Waterloo
	Report

Lockwood Park
Attendance: 298
Referee: Rob Sheard

24 April 2010

(BP) Hull Ionians	29 - 3	Preston Grasshoppers
	Report

Brantingham Park
Attendance: 200
Referee: Simon McConnell

24 April 2010

(BP) Leicester Lions	100 - 14	Kendal
	Report

Westleigh Park
Attendance: 100
Referee: Richard Parker-Sedgmore

24 April 2010

Macclesfield	26 - 18	Loughborough Students
	Report

Priory Park
Attendance: 506
Referee: Andrew Vertigan

24 April 2010

(BP) Rugby Lions	26 - 34	Harrogate (BP)
	Report

Webb Ellis Road
Attendance: 245
Referee: Andrew Bickle

24 April 2010

(BP) Westoe	26 - 48	Caldy (BP)
	Report

Wood Terrace
Referee: D Edmunds

=== Round 20 (rescheduled game) ===
29 April 2010

Preston Grasshoppers	3 - 54	Macclesfield (BP)
	Report

Lightfoot Green
Attendance: 217
Referee: John Meredith

- Game rescheduled from 2 January 2010.

=== Round 17 (rescheduled games) ===
1 May 2010

Bradford & Bingley	13 - 25	Huddersfield
	Report

Wagon Lane
Attendance: 270
Referee: D Edmunds

- Game rescheduled from 9 January 2010.

1 May 2010

Caldy	26 - 22	Harrogate (2BP)
	Report

Paton Field
Attendance: 341
Referee: Steve Harland

- Game rescheduled from 9 January 2010.

1 May 2010

(BP) Fylde	53 - 13	Broadstreet
	Report

Woodlands Memorial Ground
Attendance: 252
Referee: Philip Davis

- Game rescheduled from 9 January 2010.

1 May 2010

(BP) Hull Ionians	23 - 10	Kendal
	Report

Brantingham Park
Attendance: 200
Referee: Brendan Fitzmaurice

- Game rescheduled from 9 January 2010.

1 May 2010

(BP) Leicester Lions	50 - 7	Waterloo
	Report

Westleigh Park
Attendance: 120
Referee: Karl Kirkpatrick

- Game rescheduled from 9 January 2010.

1 May 2010

(BP) Macclesfield	50 - 17	Hull
	Report

Priory Park
Attendance: 340
Referee: John Meredith

- Game rescheduled from 9 January 2010.

1 May 2010

(BP) Rugby Lions	31 - 10	Preston Grasshoppers
	Report

Webb Ellis Road
Attendance: 320
Referee: Matthew Daubney

- Game rescheduled from 9 January 2010.

=== Round 17 (rescheduled game) ===
5 May 2010

(BP) Westoe	19 - 22	Loughborough Students
	Report

Wood Terrace
Attendance: 100
Referee: Andrew Vertigan

- Game rescheduled from 9 January 2010.

=== Rounds 18, 20 & 22 (rescheduled games) ===
8 May 2010

(2BP) Bradford & Bingley	25 - 29	Caldy (BP)
	Report

Wagon Lane
Attendance: 195
Referee: Brendan Fitzmaurice

- Game rescheduled from 16 January 2010.

8 May 2010

(BP) Broadstreet	12 - 19	Harrogate
	Report

Ivor Preece Field
Attendance: 150
Referee: Luke Pearce

- Game rescheduled from 20 February 2010.

8 May 2010

(BP) Huddersfield	24 - 31	Leicester Lions (BP)
	Report

Lockwood Park
Attendance: 123
Referee: Darren Gamage

- Game rescheduled from 16 January 2010.

8 May 2010

Kendal	14 - 40	Macclesfield (BP)
	Report

Mint Bridge
Attendance: 478
Referee: Chris Sharp

- Game rescheduled from 16 January 2010.

8 May 2010

Preston Grasshoppers	10 - 32	Loughborough Students (BP)
	Report

Lightfoot Green
Attendance: 123
Referee: Andrew Jackson

- Game rescheduled from 30 January 2010.

8 May 2010

(BP) Waterloo	34 - 5	Fylde
	Report

St Antony's Road
Attendance: 312
Referee: Wayne Falla

- Game rescheduled from 16 January 2010.

=== Rounds 18 & 20 (rescheduled games) ===
15 May 2010

Huddersfield	C - C	Hull Ionians

- Game rescheduled from 30 January 2010. Game would ultimately be cancelled as result would have no outcome on final league table.

15 May 2010

Preston Grasshoppers	C - C	Westoe

- Game rescheduled from 16 January 2010. Game would ultimately be cancelled as result would have no outcome on final league table.

=== Promotion play-off ===
Each season, the runners-up in the National League 2 North and National League 2 South participate in a play-off for promotion into National League 1. Loughborough Students were runners-up in the North and would host the game as they had a better record in the league in comparison to the South runners up Rosslyn Park.

15 May 2010
15:00

Loughborough Students	21 - 43	Rosslyn Park
	Report

Loughborough University Stadium
Attendance: 1,000
Referee: Michael Tutty

== Total season attendances ==
- Figures not including north–south promotion playoff.

Club	Home Games	Total	Average	Highest	Lowest	% Capacity
Bradford & Bingley	15	3,053	204	275	100	5%
Broadstreet	14 (Note: Missing home attendance v Hull on 14 November 2009.)	3,379	241	500	150	16%
Caldy	15	3,628	242	402	123	6%
Fylde	15	5,961	397	735	217	5%
Harrogate	13 (Note: Missing home attendances v Rugby Lions on 5 September 2009 and Waterloo on 27 February 2010.)	2,561	197	300	125	4%
Huddersfield	13 (Note: Only played 14 home games as 1 game cancelled. Missing home attendance v Preston Grasshoppers on 27 March 2010.)	3,035	233	303	123	16%
Hull	15	2,710	181	400	100	12%
Hull Ionians	15	3,600	240	500	150	16%
Kendal	15	6,446	430	523	334	9%
Leicester Lions	15	2,036	136	250	100	7%
Loughborough Students	15	2,470	165	250	100	5%
Macclesfield	14 (Note: Missing home attendance v Waterloo on 10 October 2009.)	3,549	254	506	144	20%
Preston Grasshoppers	13 (Note: Only played 14 home games as 1 game cancelled. Missing home attendance v Rugby Lions on 19 September 2009.)	3,370	259	473	123	12%
Rugby Lions	14 (Note: Missing home attendance v Huddersfield on 23 October 2009.)	3,407	243	533	160	6%
Waterloo	15	4,946	330	595	200	3%
Westoe	11 (Note: Missing home attendances v Harrogate on 12 September 2009, Preston Grasshoppers on 26 September 2009, Waterloo on 24 October 2009 and Caldy on 24 April 2010.)	1,807	164	250	100	

== Individual statistics ==
- Note that points scorers includes tries as well as conversions, penalties and drop goals.

=== Top points scorers ===
Rank	Player	Team	Appearances	Points
1	(England) Ross Winney	Macclesfield	30	422
2	(England) Richard Vasey	Caldy	30	352
3	(England) Chris Johnson	Huddersfield	28	327
4	(England) Jon Boden	Leicester Lions	24	246
5	(England) Lloyd Warner	Rugby Lions	26	240
6	(England) Mark Ireland	Kendal	25	215
7	(England) Dan Richards	Broadstreet	23	201
8	(England) Tom Barlow	Fylde	23	199
9	(England) Charlie Rayner	Westoe	24	197
10	(England) George Drake	Loughborough Students	24	189

=== Top try scorers ===
Rank	Player	Team	Appearances	Tries
1	(England) Paul Arnold	Caldy	28	27
2	(England) Greg Summers	Broadstreet	26	22
2	(England) Thomas Harris	Rugby Lions	28	22
2	(England) Robert 'Evan' Stewart	Macclesfield	28	22
3	(England) Scott Alfred	Leicester Lions	25	20
4	(England) Nathan Lambden	Loughborough Students	25	18
4	(England) Gareth Collins	Leicester Lions	29	18
5	(England) Phil Burgess	Loughborough Students	20	16
5	(Malta) James O'Brien	Waterloo	21	16
6	(England) Daniel Baines	Macclesfield	26	15
6	(England) Richard Hughes	Macclesfield	29	15

== Season records ==
=== Team ===
Largest home win — 86 pts

100 - 14 Leicester Lions at home to Kendal on 24 April 2010

Largest away win — 90 pts

104 - 14 Macclesfield away to Waterloo on 30 January 2010

Most points scored — 104 pts

104 - 14 Macclesfield away to Waterloo on 30 January 2010

Most tries in a match — 15 (x2)

Macclesfield away to Waterloo on 30 January 2010
Leicester Lions at home to Kendal on 24 April 2010

Most conversions in a match — 13

Macclesfield away to Waterloo on 30 January 2010

Most penalties in a match — 6

Huddersfield away to Caldy on 12 September 2009

Most drop goals in a match — 2

Kendal away to Huddersfield on 10 April 2010

=== Player ===
Most points in a match — 49

(England) Ross Winney for Macclesfield away to Waterloo on 30 January 2010

Most tries in a match — 4 (x4)

(England) Greg Summers for Broadstreet away to Hull Ionians on 26 September 2009
(England) John Williamson for Leicester Lions at home to Westoe on 14 November 2009
(England) Ross Winney for Macclesfield away to Waterloo on 30 January 2010
(England) Matthew Clark for Huddersfield at home to Waterloo on 24 April 2010

Most conversions in a match — 13

(England) Ross Winney for Macclesfield away to Waterloo on 30 January 2010

Most penalties in a match — 6

(England) Chris Johnson for Huddersfield away to Caldy on 12 September 2009

Most drop goals in a match — 2

(England) Mike Scott for Kendal away to Huddersfield on 10 April 2010

=== Attendances ===
Highest — 735

Fylde at home to Preston Grasshoppers on 6 February 2010

Lowest — 100 (x11)

Bradford & Bingley at home to Leicester Lions on 3 October 2009
Hull at home to Kendal on 7 November 2009
Loughborough Students at home to Rugby Lions on 2 January 2010
Westoe at home to Hull on 23 January 2010
Leicester Lions at home to Hull on 6 February 2010
Leicester Lions at home to Hull Ionians on 20 February 2010
Loughborough Students at home to Broadstreet on 27 February 2010
Leicester Lions at home to Harrogate on 27 March 2010
Loughborough Students at home to Leicester Lions on 3 April 2010
Leicester Lions at home to Kendal on 24 April 2010
Westoe at home to Loughborough Students on 5 May 2010

Highest Average Attendance — 430

Kendal

Lowest Average Attendance — 136

Leicester Lions

== See also ==
- English Rugby Union Leagues
- English rugby union system
- Rugby union in England
