= Richard Vasey =

English rugby union player

- Born: 31 January 1985 (age 41) Leeds, England
- Height: 1.83 m (6 ft 0 in)
- Weight: 85 kg (13 st 5 lb)
- School: Silcoates School
- University: Leeds Metropolitan University

Rugby union career
- Position: Fly-half
- Current team: Caldy
Senior career
Years	Team	Apps	(Points)
2005	Morley		
–	Leeds Carnegie	22	(55)
–	Rotherham Titans	1	(0)
–	Moseley	27	(132)
–	Caldy	159	(1449)
- Correct as of 28 April 2018

Richard Vasey (born 1985) is an English rugby union player, currently playing at Fly-half for Caldy in National League 2 North. A talented player who has experience of playing at a higher level with clubs such as Leeds Carnegie and Moseley, Vasey is a reliable points kicker who has become one of the most prolific in National League 2 North history with over 1,400 points for Caldy. He has also been capped by England Students.

== Career ==
=== Leeds Carnegie ===
Vasey was born in Leeds but grew up in nearby Wakefield where he attended Silcoates School. On finishing school he enrolled at Leeds Metropolitan University to study business and finance alongside playing rugby union for local side, Morley. While at Morley Vasey came to the attention of Leeds Carnegie (then known as Leeds Tykes), for who he signed in 2005. His first season at the club, who were fighting for Premiership survival, saw first team opportunities limited, with only the one appearance (from the substitutes bench) in a Powergen Cup match.

Relegation at the end of the 2005–06 season meant that Leeds started the next season in National Division 1. The relegation meant that several key players would leave the club and this gave Vasey opportunities. He became a useful squad player, playing 17 league games and contributing 46 points, as Leeds edged out Yorkshire rivals, Rotherham Titans, to win the league title and make an instant return to the Premiership. While playing at Leeds, Vasey was still enrolled at university and this made him eligible for the England Students team, gaining a cap in a loss against Italy under-25's in February 2006.

Back in the Premiership, Vasey once more found opportunities hard to come as Leeds new signing, Alberto Di Bernardo, was preferred at first choice. He joined Rotherham Titans on loan towards the end of the 2007–08 season but only managed one league appearance due to injury as well as commitments for the England Students side, which included a game against France.

=== Moseley ===
In September 2008, Vasey moved south to sign for Moseley, after initially appearing to sign terms with Rotherham Titans. He had an excellent start to the season at his new club, playing and scoring regularly in National Division 1. However, by the winter he suffered a loss of form and was displaced by team-mate Tristan Roberts, meaning that he did not appear in Moseley's EDF Energy Trophy triumph at the end of the season, when they defeated his former club, Leeds Carnegie, 23–18, in the final at Twickenham. Despite losing his first-team place, Vasey played his part in Moseley's successful season, making 27 appearances and scoring 132 points across all competitions.

=== Caldy ===
For the 2009–10 season Vasey left Moseley to join Merseyside based Caldy - playing two divisions below in National League 2 North - where he would combine his rugby with studying at the University of Liverpool. He had an excellent debut season, playing every game and finishing as the divisions second top scorer with 352 points as Caldy narrowly missed out on a promotion spot in what was one of the most competitive league finishes in the divisions history. The year would end with Vasey being called by Yorkshire to play in the 2011 County Championships. Yorkshire went agonizingly close to making the final, losing out to fierce rivals Lancashire on points difference, despite beating them 30–28 in the final match, with Vasey kicking 13 points.

The following season he was prominent in a Caldy side that this time finished 5th in the table, with 323 points making him once more the division's second top scorer. The year would end with silverware as he was part of the Caldy side that would share the Cheshire Cup with Sale Jets despite the final being cancelled. He would also be called up to the 2012 County Championships, this time playing for Cheshire. The 2011–12 season started well until Vasey broke his leg in a league game against Westoe in November. This injury kept him out for most of the season, although he did return in April 2012 to kick the final conversion in Caldy's Cheshire Cup 28–0 victory against Northwich at Lymm as they retained the trophy. Despite Vasey missing most of the season, Caldy made the promotion playoff game by finishing second. They travelled down to National League 2 South runners up Richmond but lost a very tight game 20–13 to the London side.

The 2012–13 season would be Vasey's first full season back from injury and he was once again second top scorer in the division with 289 points in a Caldy side that disappointed in the league, finishing 10th. Despite dropping down the league, he would experience more silverware as his side retained the Cheshire Cup by beating Birkenhead Park in the final at Moreton, Merseyside. The following season, Caldy improved to finish 8th in the league with Vasey scoring 209 points, and once again they made the Cheshire Cup final, although this time they lost 26–21 to Sale at Lymm. His performances for a mid-table Caldy side were good enough to get Vasey a repeat call-up by Cheshire for the 2014 County Championships, playing all 3 games and scoring 29 points for his county as they missed out on a place in the final after losing the final game to Lancashire, 19–25. The 2014–15 season saw Vasey lose his regular spot to Gavin Roberts who was preferred as the main kicker, as Caldy improved to finish 6th. Of recent times Vasey has become more of a squad player as Caldy have become serious contenders for promotion from the division.

== Season-by-season playing stats ==
Season	Club	Competition	Appearances	Tries	Drop Goals	Conversions	Penalties	Total Points
2005-06	Leeds Carnegie	Guinness Premiership	0	0	0	0	0	0
2005-06	Leeds Carnegie	Heineken Cup	0	0	0	0	0	0
2005-06	Leeds Carnegie	Powergen Cup	1	0	0	0	0	0
2006-07	Leeds Carnegie	National Division 1	17	1	0	13	5	46
2006-07	Leeds Carnegie	EDF Energy Trophy	2	0	0	3	1	9
2007-08	Leeds Carnegie	Guinness Premiership	2	0	0	0	0	0
2007-08	Rotherham Titans	National Division 1	1	0	0	0	0	0
2008-09	Moseley	National Division 1	24	1	4	28	18	127
2008-09	Moseley	EDF Energy Trophy	3	0	0	1	1	5
2009-10	Caldy	National League 2 North	30	2	6	99	42	352
2010-11	Caldy	National League 2 North	28	9	5	80	46	323
2011-12	Caldy	National League 2 North	14	1	1	35	25	153
2012-13	Caldy	National League 2 North	27	2	4	51	55	289
2013-14	Caldy	National League 2 North	28	2	1	62	24	209
2014-15	Caldy	National League 2 North	18	1	0	20	14	87
2015-16	Caldy	National League 2 North	13	0	0	6	8	36
2016-17	Caldy	National League 2 North	0	0	0	0	0	0
2017-18	Caldy	National League 2 North	1	0	0	0	0	0

== Honours and records ==
Leeds Carnegie

- National Division 1 champions: 2006–07

Caldy

- Cheshire Cup winners (3): 2011, 2012, 2013

Yorkshire

- Called up to County Championship: 2010

Cheshire

- Called up to County Championship: 2011, 2014

International/Representative

- Capped by England Students: 2006, 2007, 2008
