= Ignacio Elosu =

- Born: 31 October 1980 (age 46) Buenos Aires, Argentina
- Height: 1.73 m (5 ft 8 in)
- Weight: 110 kg (17 st 5 lb)

Rugby union career
- Position: Prop
- Current team: Exeter Chiefs
Senior career
Years	Team	Apps	(Points)
- Castres
- Tarbes
- Harlequins
- Viadana
2010–2011	Exeter Chiefs		
2011-	Esher RFC		
International career
Years	Team	Apps	(Points)
- Argentina U21

Ignacio Elosu (born 31 October 1980) is a rugby union player whose principal position is prop. He has previously played for Exeter Chiefs in Premiership Rugby and he joined Esher RFC in the RFU Championship from Exeter in the summer of 2011.
