= David Tait =

Scotland international rugby union player

- Born: David Campbell Tait; 5 July 1987 Sale, Greater Manchester
- Died: 12 December 2012 (aged 25) Kowloon, Hong Kong
- Height: 6 ft 4 in (1.93 m)
- Weight: 105 kg (16 st 7 lb)
- School: Sale Grammar School

Rugby union career
- Position(s): Number Eight, Flanker
Youth career
- Broughton Park Rugby Union F.C
- –: Altrincham Kersal
Senior career
Years	Team	Apps	(Points)
2005–2010	Sale Sharks	28	(0)
National sevens team
Years	Team		Comps
2009–2010	Scotland		Dubai

David Tait (5 July 1987 – 12 December 2012) was a professional rugby union player for Sale Sharks in the Guinness Premiership.

== Career ==
Tait played as a Number 8, although he could also operate as a Flanker. He also represented Scotland at rugby sevens. Tait made his Sale debut in a Powergen Cup match against Llanelli Scarlets. He "left the club in 2010 after suffering persistent injuries, having made just 40 appearances".

Tait represented the England Under 20 team. He was called up to the England sevens training squad for the 2008–09 IRB Sevens World Series. However, Tait did not represent England and later competed for Scotland at the 2009 Dubai Sevens.

In November 2011, Tait started a career at KPMG Hong Kong in the Corporate Finance team. While there, he also became captain for the Kowloon RFC first fifteen. He went on to lead the first team to their first Hong Kong Premiership League title in 30 years, during the 2011–2012 season.

== Personal life ==
Tait was born in Sale, Greater Manchester, England, where he attended Sale Grammar School. Later he attended Sedbergh School and took a history degree at Manchester University. He was of Scottish descent on his father's side. His father Campbell Tait, a judge, died in 2004.

== Death ==
Tait died after falling from the roof of the Harbourview Horizon apartment block in Hung Hom, Hong Kong, on 12 December 2012. The coroner was unable to determine if the fall was suicide or an accident. The Hong Kong national rugby union team wore black armbands during the 2012 Cup of Nations in his memory.
