= Oliver Brennand =

English rugby union player

- Born: 24 January 1986 (age 40)
- School: Arnold School
- University: Durham University

Rugby union career
- Position: Wing
- Current team: Fylde
Senior career
Years	Team	Apps	(Points)
2004–17	Fylde	267	(1,085)
- Correct as of 29 April 2017
International career
Years	Team	Apps	(Points)
2008, 11, 15	England Counties XV	6	(30)
- Correct as of 30 April 2016

Oliver "Ollie" Brennand (born 1986) is an English rugby union footballer, who last played as a winger for Fylde in National League 1. He is Fylde's record try scorer with over 200 tries, and is also one of the most prolific try scorers ever in both National League 1 and National League 2 North. As well as playing club rugby he has also been capped by England Counties XV and Lancashire – with whom he has won the Bill Beaumont Cup four times.

== Career ==
=== Early career ===
Growing up in Lytham St Annes Brennand attended the Arnold School and played youth rugby for Fylde. Upon leaving school he enrolled at Durham University but remained part of the Fylde squad, making his first team debut for the club aged 18 when he came on as a late substitute in a 15–9 away win against Whitchurch in the Powergen Cup on 18 September 2005. Due to his university commitments he had to wait until 22 January 2005 for his league debut, making an appearance for the bench in a 31–17 win away to Rugby Lions, before scoring his first tries for the club, claiming a hat-trick in a 27–25 league away win against Kendal – a sign of things to come. He went on to make 4 more appearances for Fylde as they finished 4th in National Division 3 North ending up with 6 tries from just 7 appearances in league and cup games. The next couple of seasons would mimic Brennand's first as he was restricted to a scattering of appearances due to attending university in the north-east of England.

=== Fylde Regular ===
The 2007–08 season would be Brennand's first with Fylde since completing university and he would quickly become a first team regular with the club. He scored a hat-trick in the second league game of the season, a 25–18 home win over Lancashire rivals Preston Grasshoppers, and did not look back, going on to score 22 tries in 26 league appearances, becoming the top try scorer in National Division 3 North that season and helping his club to a 3rd-place finish. His try scoring form with Fylde saw him come to the attention of Lancashire and he was selected as part of the men's senior squad to take part in the 2008 County Championship. He made his county debut on 5 May 2008, scoring 2 tries in a 32–25 win over Warwickshire at Lightfoot Green, Preston. Although Lancashire would fail to get out of the group stage that year, Brennand was selected for the England Counties XV squad to tour the United States and Canada in June. He played 2 of the 3 games on tour, with the highlight being a try on his debut as the Counties beat USA Eagles A 27–3 in New York City on 6 June 2008.

Brennand's excellent try scoring run would continue into the 2008–09 season, finishing as joint 3rd top try scorer with 24 tries from 24 league appearances (level with team-mate Nick Royle) as Fylde finished 4th in the division. He would also experience his first taste of silverware as Fylde went on to win the Lancashire for the first time since 1995, scoring a try in a 37–17 win away to Preston Grasshoppers. Brennand proved to be equally as prolific in the cup as in the league, having already grabbed 5 tries against West Park St Helens and 2 against Broughton Park in the earlier rounds, to add to the one he got in the final. A shoulder injury towards the end of the season meant that he had to miss out Lancashire's first couple of games in the county championships but he returned to the side for the final group game, scoring a try in an 80–12 win over Northumberland at Park Lane, Whitefield, to help book a spot in the final. On 1 June 2009 Brennand experienced his first county silverware with Lancashire, featuring in the side that outclassed Gloucestershire 32–18 at Twickenham Stadium.

While the previous couple of seasons had been fruitful, 2009–10 would be largely disappointing for Brennand. He started the season reasonably well with 5 tries from 11 league appearances but reinjured his shoulder in a November match against Rugby Lions. This time the injury was worse and he would keep him out of the Fylde team for the rest of the season, including missing out as the club retained the Lancashire Cup by defeating Preston Grasshoppers 15–7 away. He did recover in time to take part in the county championships with Lancashire but was restricted to the bench as his county retained the Bill Beaumont Cup, with an even more emphatic 36–6 win at Twickenham against the previous years' opponents Gloucestershire.

=== League Champions ===
After the injury hell of the previous season, 2010–11 would be one of the best of Brennand's career. His Fylde side had been hovering around the top of National League 2 North (previously National Division 3 South) for some time, but the acquisition of England legend Jason Robinson who had come out of retirement to sign for the club, meant that it was an exciting time to be involved with Fylde. With an attacking array of talent that included Robinson, Brennand and England Sevens international Nick Royle, Fylde would storm to the title winning 26 of the 30 games played and claiming 26 try bonus points on the way. Brennand played a key role in the title victory, grabbing 29 tries from just 24 league appearances, and finishing second top try scorer in the league. By winning the league, Fylde were promoted to National League 1 – which at tier 3 of the English league system was the highest level the club had reached since the mid 1990s. Fylde also won the double that season, although they retained the Lancashire Cup in much less spectacular fashion, as opponents Rossendale pulled out of the final, leaving the Woodlands side as champions by default, having only played one game in the competition that year, a 20–13 win over Preston Grasshoppers in the first round (Fylde's semi-final opponents had also pulled out).

Success at club level would be replicated at county level as Brennand was selected once more for the Lancashire side taking part in the county championships. He scored five tries in the group stage, including a hat-trick against Warwickshire as his side qualified for yet another final by winning all three games. At Twickenham, Lancashire went on to defeat southern group winners Hertfordshire 32–23, with Brennand scoring his counties' final try. In June Brennand was selected for the England Counties XV for their tour of Spain. He played in all three games on the tour, scoring 5 tries, 4 of which came in the 104–10 win over a Castille & Leon XV in Salamanca as the Counties finished the tour unbeaten.

=== National League 1 ===
Brennand and Fylde had a decent 2011–12 season. The newly promoted club managed to exceed expectations by finishing in an excellent 4th position in what was a very strong league which featured ambitious teams such as Ealing Trailfinders and Jersey and Brennand finished as the second top try scorer in the division with 27 tries – behind Ealing's record breaking Phil Chesters who was way ahead with 42. Outside of league rugby, Fylde also went through to the final of the Lancashire Cup where the faced Sedgley Park. Brennand had missed the early rounds of the competition but was recalled for the final, where Fylde, despite having home advantage and Brennand scoring a hat-trick, succumbed 31–33 to Sedgley Park, and failed to win the cup for the first time in four seasons. During the summer Brennand was selected for Lancashire for the annual county championships. He missed a couple of the group games due to other commitments (including playing in a sevens competition in Amsterdam) but made up for this by scoring 4 tries in a 54–33 win away to rivals Yorkshire which effectively sealed Lancashire's passage through to the final at Twickenham. On 27 May 2012 Lancashire lost the Bill Beaumont for the first time in four years, losing 20–38 to Hertfordshire in a repeat of the previous years final, Brennand making an appearance from the substitutes bench to no avail.

Fylde continued to establish themselves in National League 1 the following season, finishing 6th in the division, with Brennand getting 23 tries and ending up as the 3rd top try scorer in the league. Brennand also featured in the Lancashire Cup but was unable to help Fylde make the final as they went out to rivals Preston Grasshoppers (playing in the division below) disappointing 24–25 defeat at the Woodlands. With the defeat went the club's last chance to win the Lancashire Cup as the competition was discontinued the following season due to the number of teams that pulled out of games as they prioritised league matches instead. At the season's end Brennand had a break from rugby with Lancashire who were taking part in the 2013 Bill Beaumont Cup – the first time in five years that he had not featured at the county championships.

The 2013–14 season saw Fylde moved up the league table for their best ever finish in National League – finishing 3rd. As always Brennand contributed with the tries, his total of 20 making him the second highest try scorer in the division (tied with two other players). After missing out on the season before he returned to county championship rugby with Lancashire, being part of the squad that went to the 2014 Bill Beaumont Cup. He played in the first two group games, scoring 2 tries as the White Rose qualified for yet another Twickenham final, despite losing the last match 13–20 to Cheshire (a game Brennand missed). On 1 June 2014 Brennand was in the starting 15 as Lancashire won the cup with a 36–26 victory over Cornwall in what was a repeat of the previous year. It would be Lancashire 23rd title in the competition, and Brennard's 4th.

The following season saw Fylde drop one position to 4th with Brennand finished as 3rd top try scorer with a tally of 25 tries. The season was a particularly notable one for Brennand as he broke Fylde's try scoring record of 198 set by Brendon Hanavan, scoring 4 tries in a 28–24 win away to Blaydon on 10 February 2015 to take his own total to 202. Later on that month he returned to the England Counties XV for his first cap since 2011, appearing in the Counties 37–3 win over Scottish Club XV on 27 February 2015 held at his home ground at the Woodlands. Brennand was also picked by Lancashire for the 2015 Bill Beaumont Cup although he played only a minor role in the side as they reached the final for the seventh year in a row, coming on as a substitute in the 13–18 defeat to Cornwall in what was his only appearance of the tournament.

The 2015–16 season was Fylde's worst in National League 1 to date as they finished in 10th place. Despite playing in a mid-table side, Brennand still managed to help himself to 21 tries from the 30 games he played in – the fourth best in the division. He had a quiet close season as he was not selected by Lancashire the 2016 Bill Beaumont Cup, making way for some of the younger up and coming talent in the country. 2016–17 proved to be even poorer for Fylde as they slipped down the table to finish in 12th place, while Brennand, typically so prolific, scored only one try all season – the worst tally of his career.

== Season-by-season playing stats ==
=== Club ===
Season	Club	Competition	Appearances	Tries	Drop Goals	Conversions	Penalties	Total Points
2004–05	Fylde	National Division 3 North	6	6	0	0	0	30
2004–05	Fylde	Powergen Cup	1	0	0	0	0	0
2004–05	Fylde	Lancashire Cup	0 (Note: Fylde withdrew from Lancashire Cup during the 2004–05 season due to fixture congestion, playing no games in the competition that year.)	0	0	0	0	0
2005–06	Fylde	National Division 3 North	7	4	0	0	0	20
2005–06	Fylde	Lancashire Cup	0 (Note: May have played in Fylde's 81–0 Lancashire Cup first round win over Rossendale during 2005–06 season but no record of game online. No mention of playing or scoring in the two other games Fylde played in the competition that year.)	0	0	0	0	0
2006–07	Fylde	National Division 3 North	4	6	0	0	0	30
2006–07	Fylde	Lancashire Cup	0 (Note: Didn't play in Fylde's 29–46 quarter final loss in the 2006–07 Lancashire Cup. Fylde had earlier had a walkover so Brennand played no games in the competition that season.)	0	0	0	0	0
2007–08	Fylde	National Division 3 North	26	22	0	0	0	110
2007–08	Fylde	EDF Energy Trophy	2	4	0	0	0	20
2007–08	Fylde	Lancashire Cup	0 (Note: Fylde were supposed to play Preston Grasshoppers in the 2007–08 Lancashire Cup 1st Round but there does not to seem to have been a game played. In the next game Fylde would field a second string in the semi-final 16–48 defeat to Waterloo – a game Brennand does not appear to have played in.)	0	0	0	0	0
2008–09	Fylde	National Division 3 North	24	24	0	0	0	120
2008–09	Fylde	EDF Energy Trophy	1	0	0	0	0	0
2008–09	Fylde	Lancashire Cup	3	8	0	0	0	40
2009–10	Fylde	National League 2 North	11	5	0	0	0	25
2009–10	Fylde	Lancashire Cup	0	0	0	0	0	0
2010–11	Fylde	National League 2 North	24	29	0	0	0	145
2010–11	Fylde	Lancashire Cup	1	0	0	0	0	0
2011–12	Fylde	National League 1	29	27	0	0	0	135
2011–12	Fylde	Lancashire Cup	1	3	0	0	0	15
2012–13	Fylde	National League 1	29	23	0	0	0	115
2012–13	Fylde	Lancashire Cup	1	0	0	0	0	0
2013–14	Fylde	National League 1	29	20	0	0	0	100
2014–15	Fylde	National League 1	29	25	0	0	0	125
2015–16	Fylde	National League 1	30	21	0	0	0	105
2016–17	Fylde	National League 1	15	1	0	0	0	5

=== County/Representative ===
Season	Club	Competition	Appearances	Tries	Drop Goals	Conversions	Penalties	Total Points
2007–08	Lancashire	Bill Beaumont Cup	1 (Note: Played at least 1 game in 2008 Bill Beaumont Cup scoring 2 tries. Likely to have played in the other 2 group games but this is not clear due to poor press coverage of competition that year.)	2	0	0	0	10
2007–08	England Counties XV	Tour of USA and Canada	2	1	0	0	0	5
2008–09	Lancashire	Bill Beaumont Cup	2	1	0	0	0	5
2009–10	Lancashire	Bill Beaumont Cup	0 (Note: Was on the bench for two games in the 2010 Bill Beaumont Cup including the final although it is not clear whether he appeared in either game, as he did not score any tries. Had suffered a serious injury in a league game earlier in the season which may explain why he did not start any games.)	0	0	0	0	0
2010–11	Lancashire	Bill Beaumont Cup	4	6	0	0	0	30
2010–11	England Counties XV	Tour of Spain	3	5	0	0	0	25
2011–12	Lancashire	Bill Beaumont Cup	2	4	0	0	0	20
2013–14	Lancashire	Bill Beaumont Cup	3	2	0	0	0	10
2013–14	England Counties XV	Test match	1	0	0	0	0	0
2014–15	Lancashire	Bill Beaumont Cup	1	0	0	0	0	0

== Honours and records ==
Fylde

- National Division 3 North top try scorer: 2007–08 (22 tries)
- Lancashire Cup winners (2): 2009, 2011
- National League 2 North champions: 2010–11

Lancashire

- Bill Beaumont Cup winners (4): 2009, 2010, 2011, 2014

England Counties

- Capped by England Counties XV: 2008, 2011, 2015
