= 2013 Bill Beaumont Cup =

2013 Bill Beaumont Cup (County Championship)
- Countries: England
- Date: 4 May 2013 - 26 May 2013
- Champions: Lancashire (22nd title)
- Runners-up: Cornwall
- Relegated: Durham County, Kent
- Matches played: 13
- Attendance: 27,346 (average 2,104 per match)
- Highest attendance: 20,000 Lancashire v Cornwall (26 May 2013)
- Lowest attendance: 175 Gloucestershire v Kent (18 May 2013)
- Top point scorer: (England) Paul Thirlby (Cornwall) 47
- Top try scorer: (England) Nick Royle (Lancashire) 5

The 2013 Bill Beaumont Cup, also known as Bill Beaumont Cup Division One, was the 113th version of the annual, English rugby union, County Championship organized by the RFU for the top tier English counties. Each county drew its players from rugby union clubs from the third tier and below of the English rugby union league system (typically National League 1, National League 2 South or National League 2 North). The counties were divided into two regional pools with the winners of each pool meeting in the final held at Twickenham Stadium. New counties to the competition included Durham County (north) and Kent (south) who won their respective groups in the 2012 County Championship Plate. Hertfordshire were the defending champions.

The northern group was won by last year's runners up, Lancashire, who booked a place in their fifth successive final in what was a very close group, edging Cheshire and Yorkshire by virtue of a superior bonus points record. They were joined by southern group winners, Cornwall, who were appearing in their first Twickenham final since 1999. Cornwall had perhaps an easier route through to the final, winning all three games, but looked very impressive in their six try demolition of last year's winners, Hertfordshire, in their final pool game to book their place. Both promoted counties, Durham County and Kent, were relegated to the 2014 County Championship Plate.

Over 10,000 Cornish fans made the journey to Twickenham but were unable to help their team to victory as Lancashire emerged victorious by defeating Cornwall, 35 - 26, in what was an exciting game. Lancashire's Nick Royle had an excellent tournament by finishing top try scorer with 5 including 1 in the final, while Cornwall's Paul Thirlby was the tournament's top scorer with 47 points.

== Competition format ==
The competition format was two regional group stages divided into north and south, with each team playing each other once. This meant that two teams in the pool had two home games, while the other two had just one. The top side in each group went through to the final held at Twickenham Stadium on 26 May 2013.

== Participating Counties and ground locations ==
Locations of the 2013 Bill Beaumont Cup county teams

County	Stadium(s)	Capacity	City/Area
Cheshire	Priory Park	1,000	Macclesfield, Cheshire
Cornwall	Recreation Ground	7,000 (780 seats)	Camborne, Cornwall
Durham County	New Friarage; Eastwood Gardens	N/A; N/A	Hartlepool, County Durham; Gateshead, Tyne and Wear
Gloucestershire	Dockham Road	2,500	Cinderford, Gloucestershire
Hertfordshire	Highfields	N/A	Ware, Hertfordshire
Kent	Jack Williams Ground; Priestfields	N/A; N/A	Aylesford, Kent; Rochester, Kent
Lancashire	Woodlands Memorial Ground	9,000	Lytham St Annes, Lancashire
Yorkshire	Wagon Lane; Silver Royd	4,000; 1,950 (322 seats)	Bingley, West Yorkshire; Scalby, North Yorkshire

== Group stage ==
=== Division 1 North ===
2013 Beaumont Cup Division 1 North Table
	County	Played	Won	Drawn	Lost	Points For	Points Against	Points Difference	Try Bonus	Losing Bonus	Points
1	Lancashire (Q)	3	2	0	1	88	74	14	2	1	11
2	Cheshire	3	2	0	1	66	63	3	1	1	10
3	Yorkshire	3	2	0	1	66	55	11	0	0	8
4	Durham County (R)	3	0	0	3	63	91	-28	2	1	3
If teams are level at any stage, tiebreakers are applied in the following order: 1. Number of matches won 2. Difference between points for and against 3. Total number of points for 4. Aggregate number of points scored in matches between tied teams 5. Number of matches won excluding the first match, then the second and so on until the tie is settled
Green background means the county qualified for the final. Pink background means the county were demoted to Division 2 North of the County Championship Plate for the following season. Updated: 18 May 2013; Source: "County Championships". englandrugby.com.

==== Round 1 ====
4 May 2013
15:00

(BP) Durham County	29 - 40	Lancashire (BP)
	Report

New Friarage, Hartlepool
Attendance: 310
Referee: Marcus Caton

4 May 2013
15:00

Yorkshire	21 - 15	Cheshire (BP)

Wagon Lane, Bingley
Attendance: 295
Referee: Will Halford

==== Round 2 ====
11 May 2013
15:00

(2BP) Durham County	29 - 31	Cheshire (BP)

Eastwood Gardens, Gateshead
Attendance: 194
Referee: Graham Dickens

11 May 2013
15:00

(BP) Lancashire	35 - 25	Yorkshire

Woodlands Memorial Ground, Lytham St Annes
Attendance: 740
Referee: Wayne Falla

==== Round 3 ====
18 May 2013
15:00

Cheshire	20 - 13	Lancashire (BP)

Priory Park, Macclesfield
Attendance: 479
Referee: Andrew Jackson

18 May 2013
15:00

Yorkshire	20 - 5	Durham County
	Report

Silver Royd, Scalby
Attendance: 1,100
Referee: Andrew Rawson

=== Division 1 South ===
2013 Beaumont Cup Division 1 South Table
	County	Played	Won	Drawn	Lost	Points For	Points Against	Points Difference	Try Bonus	Losing Bonus	Points
1	Cornwall (Q)	3	3	0	0	88	65	23	1	0	13
2	Hertfordshire	3	2	0	1	135	89	46	3	0	11
3	Gloucestershire	3	1	0	2	77	100	-23	2	1	7
4	Kent (R)	3	0	0	3	63	109	-46	0	1	1
If teams are level at any stage, tiebreakers are applied in the following order: 1. Number of matches won 2. Difference between points for and against 3. Total number of points for 4. Aggregate number of points scored in matches between tied teams 5. Number of matches won excluding the first match, then the second and so on until the tie is settled
Green background means the county qualified for the final. Pink background means the county were demoted to Division 2 South of the County Championship Plate for the following season. Updated: 18 May 2013; Source: "County Championships". englandrugby.com.

==== Round 1 ====
4 May 2013
15:00

(BP) Gloucestershire	19 - 24	Cornwall
	Report

Dockham Road, Cinderford
Attendance: 407
Referee: Rowan Kitt

4 May 2013
15:00

Kent	26 - 50	Hertfordshire (BP)

Jack Williams Ground, Aylesford
Attendance: 305
Referee: Richard Kelly

==== Round 2 ====
11 May 2013
15:00

(BP) Hertfordshire	56 - 22	Gloucestershire (BP)
	Report

Highfields, Ware
Attendance: 426
Referee: Craig Maxwell-Keys

11 May 2013
15:00

(BP) Kent	17 - 23	Cornwall
	Report

Priestfields, Rochester
Attendance: 700
Referee: Tom Davis

==== Round 3 ====
18 May 2013
15:00

(BP) Cornwall	41 - 29	Hertfordshire (BP)
	Report

Recreation Ground, Camborne
Attendance: 2,215
Referee: Nick Williams

18 May 2013
15:00

(BP) Gloucestershire	36 - 20	Kent
	Report

Dockham Road, Cinderford
Attendance: 175
Referee: Phillip Davis

== Final ==
26 May 2013
15:15

Lancashire	35–26	Cornwall
Try: Royle (2), Moon, Rath; Con: Johnson (3); Pen: Johnson (2); Drop: Johnson	Report	Try: Webber, Penalty try, Vinnicombe; Con: Thirlby; Pen: Thirlby (3)

Twickenham Stadium, London
Attendance: 20,000
Referee: Wayne Falla

15	Sean Taylor	Preston Grasshoppers
14	Nick Royle	Vale of Lune
13	Chris Briers	Fylde
12	Jack Ward	Preston Grasshoppers
11	Ben Rath	Fylde
10	Chris Johnson (capt)	Fylde
9	Steve Collins	Sedgley Park
1	Dan Birchall	Fylde
2	Jon Matthews	Otley
3	Simon Griffiths	Fylde
4	Paul Arnold	Fylde
5	Louis McGowan (capt)	Sedgley Park
6	Jon Nugent	Stade Dijon
7	Steve McGinnis	Fylde
8	Dominic Moon	Preston Grasshoppers
Replacements:
16	Pete Altham	Preston Grasshoppers
17	Gareth Gore	Preston Grasshoppers
18	Phil Mills	Preston Grasshoppers
19	Evan Stewart	Fylde
20	Phil Baines	Preston Grasshoppers
21	Tom Webb	Fylde
22	Grant Eddlestone	Sedgley Park

15	Jake Murphy	Cornish All Blacks
14	Richard Bright	Cornish All Blacks
13	Steve Johns	Coventry
12	Nielson Webber	Cornish All Blacks
11	Tom Notman	Redruth
10	Paul Thirlby	Redruth
9	Greg Goodfellow	Redruth
1	Darren Jacques	Redruth
2	Richard Brown	Redruth
3	Craig Williams	Redruth
4	Damien Cook	Redruth
5	Ben Hilton (capt)	Cornish All Blacks
6	Chris Fuca	Redruth
7	Sam Hocking	Plymouth Albion
8	Ashley Lawton	Camborne
Replacements:
16	Neal Turner	Redruth
17	Jon Drew	Redruth
18	Luke Collins	Redruth
19	Tom Rawlings	Cornish All Blacks
20	Matthew Shepherd	St Austell
21	Steve Perry	Unattached
22	Lewis Vinnicombe	Redruth

== Total season attendances ==
- Does not include final at Twickenham which is a neutral venue and involves teams from all three county divisions on the same day

County	Home Games	Total	Average	Highest	Lowest	% Capacity
Cheshire	1	479	479	479	479	48%
Cornwall	1	2,215	2,215	2,215	2,215	32%
Durham County	2	504	252	310	194	
Gloucestershire	2	582	291	407	175	12%
Hertfordshire	1	426	426	426	426	
Kent	2	1,005	503	700	305	
Lancashire	1	740	740	740	740	8%
Yorkshire	2	1,395	698	1,100	295	32%

== Individual statistics ==
- Note if players are tied on tries or points the player with the lowest number of appearances will come first. Also note that points scorers includes tries as well as conversions, penalties and drop goals. Appearance figures also include coming on as substitutes (unused substitutes not included). Statistics will also include final.

=== Top points scorers ===
Rank	Player	County	Club Side	Appearances	Points
1	(England) Paul Thirlby	Cornwall	Redruth	4	47
2	(England) Chris Johnson	Lancashire	Fylde	3	37
3=	(England) Mike Barlow	Cheshire	Stockport	2	31
3=	(England) Sam Stanley	Hertfordshire	Old Albanian	2	31
4	(England) Nick Royle	Lancashire	Fylde	4	25

=== Top try scorers ===
Rank	Player	County	Club Side	Appearances	Tries
1	(England) Nick Royle	Lancashire	Fylde	4	5
2	(South Africa) Stefan Liebenberg	Hertfordshire	Old Albanian	3	4
3	(England) Lloyd Stapleton	Gloucestershire	Cinderford	3	3
4=	(England) Sam Hocking	Cornwall	Plymouth Albion	4	3
4=	(England) Dominic Moon	Lancashire	Preston Grasshoppers	4	3

== See also ==
- English rugby union system
- Rugby union in England
