= 1985 England rugby union tour of New Zealand =

Summary
P	W	D	L
Total
7	4	0	3
Test match
2	0	0	2
Opponent
P	W	D	L
New Zealand
2	0	0	2

The 1985 England rugby union tour of New Zealand was a series of seven matches played by the England national rugby union team in New Zealand in May and June 1985. England played seven games, including two test matches against the New Zealand national rugby union team. They won four of the seven matches but lost both of the test matches as well as the fixture against the Auckland provincial team.

The preliminaries to this tour were shrouded in uncertainty and selection announcements containing players whose availability had not been confirmed. Dick Greenwood, England's current coach, announced he was not available having just taken a new job, and eventually 2 coaches were appointed under Derek Morgan, Martin Green and Brian Ashton. The party as a whole was very short of experience,

== Matches ==
Scores and results list England's points tally first.

Opposing Team	For	Against	Date	Venue	Status
North Auckland	27	14	18 May 1985	Okara Park, Whangarei	Tour match
Poverty Bay	45	0	22 May 1985	Rugby Park, Gisborne	Tour match
Auckland	6	24	25 May 1985	Eden Park, Auckland	Tour match
Otago	25	16	28 May 1985	Carisbrook, Dunedin	Tour match
New Zealand	13	18	1 June 1985	Lancaster Park, Christchurch	First Test
Southland	15	9	4 June 1985	Homestead Stadium, Invercargill	Tour match
New Zealand	15	42	8 June 1985	Athletic Park, Wellington	Second Test

== Touring party ==
- Manager: Derek Morgan
- Assistant manager: Brian Ashton
- Coach: Martin Green
- Captain: Paul Dodge (Leicester) 30 caps

=== Backs ===
- Chris Martin (Bath) 4 caps
- Ian Metcalfe (Moseley) No caps
- Bryan Barley (Wakefield) 4 caps
- Paul Dodge (Leicester) 30 caps
- J.M. Goodwin (Moseley) No caps
- Mike Harrison (Wakefield) No caps
- Jamie Salmon (Harlequins) No caps
- Simon Smith (Wasps) 5 caps
- Stuart Barnes (Bath) 2 caps
- Huw Davies (Wasps) 15 caps
- Richard Hill (Bath) 2 caps
- Nigel Melville (Wasps) 3 caps

=== Forwards ===
- Steve Bainbridge (Fylde) 11 caps
- Steve Brain (Coventry) 7 caps
- David Cooke (Harlequins) 10 caps
- Wade Dooley (Preston Grasshoppers) 5 caps
- Jon Hall (Bath) 3 caps
- Bob Hesford (Bristol) 10 caps
- Paul Huntsman (Headingley) No caps
- John Orwin (Gloucester) 5 caps
- Gary Pearce (Northampton) 21 caps
- Malcolm Preedy (Gloucester) 1 cap
- Gary Rees (Nottingham) 2 caps
- Austin Sheppard (Bristol) 2 caps
- Andy Simpson (Sale) No caps
- Mike Teague (Gloucester) No caps
