= 2006–07 National Division Three North =

Rugby union competition in England

- Countries: England
- Champions: Blaydon
- Runners-up: Tynedale
- Relegated: Orrell, Cleckheaton, Darlington
- Attendance: 44,916 (average 263 per match) (Note: Note that 11 home attendances are missing (see below) - so the total attendance will not be 100% accurate. The average attendance has also been taken into account with the missing games not included.)
- Highest attendance: 1,987; Fylde v Preston Grasshoppers; 23 December 2006
- Lowest attendance: 60; Leicester Lions v Tynedale; 25 November 2006
- Top point scorer: (England) James Hawken (Rugby Lions); 266 points
- Top try scorer: (England) Nick Royle (Fylde); 31 tries

The 2006–07 National Division Three North was the seventh season (nineteenth overall) of the fourth division (north) of the English domestic rugby union competition using the name National Division Three North. New teams to the division included Orrell who were relegated from the 2005–06 National Division Two while promoted teams included Rugby Lions who came up as champions of Midlands Division 1 as well as Morley (champions) and West Park St Helens who came up from North Division 1. The league system was 4 points for a win, 2 points for a draw and additional bonus points being awarded for scoring 4 or more tries and/or losing within 7 points of the victorious team. In terms of promotion the league champions would go straight up into National Division Two while the runners up would have a one-game playoff against the runners up from National Division Three South (at the home ground of the club with the superior league record) for the final promotion place.

At the end of the season Blaydon would pip Tynedale to the title by just one point with Tynedale actually having a better league record in terms of wins and draws but having fewer bonus points. After missing out on the league title by the finest of margins, Tynedale would fail to gain promotion to the 2007–08 National Division Two at the second attempt losing away to the 2006–07 National Division Three South runners up Westcombe Park in the promotion playoff. In terms of relegation Orrell would suffer their third relegation in a row, with just two draws all season, with the much more competitive Cleckheaton and Darlington going down at a later date. In Darlington's case they finished level with newly promoted West Park St Helens, with the same number of wins but with more defeats as West Park managed to draw two extra games (despite having less bonus points). Cleckheaton and Darlington would join North Division 1 for the subsequent season. In the case of Orrell the impact of relegation was much more drastic as the club folded due to its financial backers pulling out. However, an amateur version of the club would carry on playing in the South Lancs/Cheshire 2 league for 2007-08.

== Participating teams and locations ==
Locations of the 2006-07 National Division Three North teams

Team	Stadium	Capacity	City/Area
Blaydon	Crow Trees	2,000 (400 seats)	Swalwell, Tyne and Wear
Cleckheaton	Cleckheaton Sports Club		Cleckheaton, West Yorkshire
Darlington	Blackwell Meadows	3,000	Darlington, County Durham
Darlington Mowden Park	Yiewsley Drive		Darlington, County Durham
Fylde	Woodlands Memorial Ground	7,500 (500 seats)	Lytham St. Annes, Lancashire
Hull Ionians	Brantingham Park	1,500 (240 seats)	Brantingham, East Riding of Yorkshire
Leicester Lions	Westleigh Park	2,000	Blaby, Leicestershire
Macclesfield	Priory Park	1,250 (250 seats)	Macclesfield, Cheshire
Morley	Scatcherd Lane	6,000 (1,000 seats)	Morley, Leeds, West Yorkshire
Orrell	Edge Hall Road	5,300 (300 seats)	Orrell, Greater Manchester
Preston Grasshoppers	Lightfoot Green	2,250 (250 seats)	Preston, Lancashire
Rugby Lions	Webb Ellis Road	4,000 (200 seats)	Rugby, Warwickshire
Tynedale	Tynedale Park	2,000 (400 seats)	Corbridge, Northumberland
West Park St Helens	Red Rocks		St Helens, Merseyside

== Final league table ==
2006-07 National Division Three North table
Pos	Team	Pld	W	D	L	PF	PA	PD	TB	LB	Pts	Qualification
1	Blaydon (C)	26	21	0	5	847	448	+399	16	1	101	Promoted
2	Tynedale	26	21	1	4	806	367	+439	14	0	100	Promotion play-off
3	Preston Grasshoppers	26	17	1	8	704	482	+222	10	5	85	
4	Rugby Lions	26	17	1	8	652	474	+178	9	2	81	
5	Fylde	26	16	1	9	659	390	+269	11	2	79	
6	Morley	26	13	1	12	556	558	−2	9	5	68	
7	Leicester Lions	26	13	1	12	520	548	−28	5	4	63	
8	Darlington Mowden Park	26	12	2	12	572	627	−55	6	4	62	
9	Macclesfield	26	11	0	15	573	534	+39	7	8	59	
10	Hull Ionians	26	11	0	15	469	590	−121	7	5	56	
11	West Park St Helens	26	9	2	15	572	601	−29	7	6	53	
12	Darlington (R)	26	9	0	17	533	626	−93	9	8	53	Relegated
13	Cleckheaton (R)	26	5	2	19	383	675	−292	2	6	32	Relegated
14	Orrell (R)	26	0	2	24	293	1219	−926	3	3	4 (Note: Orrell deducted six points for fielding unregistered players.)	Relegated

Updated to match(es) played on 28-04-2007. Source: Rugby Statbunker
(C) Champion; (R) Relegated

== Results ==
=== Round 1 ===
2 September 2006

Blaydon	7 - 26	Preston Grasshoppers
	Report

Crow Trees
Attendance: 180
Referee: Andrew Gardner

2 September 2006

Darlington	3 - 13	Cleckheaton
	Report

Blackwell Meadows
Attendance: 120
Referee: Revis Phillips

2 September 2006

(BP) Fylde	29 - 0	Hull Ionians
	Report

Woodlands Memorial Ground
Attendance: 410
Referee: Mick Reid

2 September 2006

Leicester Lions	27 - 23	Macclesfield (BP)
	Report

Westleigh Park
Attendance: 105
Referee: Mark Liddell

2 September 2006

(BP) Morley	47 - 7	Orrell
	Report

Scatcherd Lane
Referee: Andrew Taylorson

2 September 2006

(BP) Rugby Lions	36 - 0	Darlington Mowden Park
	Report

Webb Ellis Road
Referee: Keith Lewis

2 September 2006

West Park St Helens	25 - 34	Tynedale
	Report

Red Rocks
Referee: Brendan Fitzmaurice

=== Round 2 ===
9 September 2006

(BP) Cleckheaton	21 - 28	Morley (BP)
	Report

Cleckheaton Sports Club
Attendance: 850
Referee: Matthew Daubney

9 September 2006

(BP) Darlington Mowden Park	34 - 27	West Park St Helens (BP)
	Report

Yiewsley Drive
Attendance: 200
Referee: Andrew Taylorson

9 September 2006

(BP) Hull Ionians	20 - 22	Darlington (BP)
	Report

Brantingham Park
Attendance: 300
Referee: Mark Liddell

9 September 2006

Orrell	0 - 51	Macclesfield (BP)
	Report

Edge Hall Road
Attendance: 99
Referee: Guy Steel Bodger

9 September 2006

Preston Grasshoppers	18 - 10	Fylde
	Report

Lightfoot Green
Attendance: 805
Referee: Trevor Fisher

9 September 2006

Rugby Lions	18 - 3	Leicester Lions
	Report

Webb Ellis Road
Attendance: 353
Referee: D Edmunds

9 September 2006

Tynedale	18 - 37	Blaydon (BP)
	Report

Tynedale Park
Attendance: 300
Referee: Mick Reid

=== Round 3 ===
16 September 2006

(BP) Blaydon	52 - 24	Darlington Mowden Park
	Report

Crow Trees
Attendance: 240
Referee: Rob Sheard

16 September 2006

(BP) Darlington	24 - 27	Preston Grasshoppers (BP)
	Report

Blackwell Meadows
Attendance: 180
Referee: Brendan Fitzmaurice

16 September 2006

Fylde	14 - 14	Tynedale
	Report

Woodlands Memorial Ground
Attendance: 475
Referee: Revis Phillips

16 September 2006

Leicester Lions	21 - 13	Orrell
	Report

Westleigh Park
Attendance: 110
Referee: P.W Davies

16 September 2006

Macclesfield	22 - 18	Cleckheaton (BP)
	Report

Priory Park
Attendance: 337
Referee: Darren Gamage

16 September 2006

Morley	19 - 13	Hull Ionians (BP)
	Report

Scatcherd Lane
Attendance: 275
Referee: Andrew Gardner

16 September 2006

(BP) West Park St Helens	34 - 25	Rugby Lions
	Report

Red Rocks
Attendance: 135
Referee: Chris Seeley

=== Round 4 ===
23 September 2006

(BP) Cleckheaton	53 - 28	Orrell (BP)
	Report

Cleckheaton Sports Club
Attendance: 200
Referee: Mick Reid

23 September 2006

Darlington Mowden Park	28 - 13	Fylde
	Report

Yiewsley Drive
Attendance: 180
Referee: Matthew Daubney

23 September 2006

(BP) Hull Ionians	13 - 19	Macclesfield
	Report

Brantingham Park
Attendance: 200
Referee: Brendan Fitzmaurice

23 September 2006

Preston Grasshoppers	25 - 12	Morley
	Report

Lightfoot Green
Attendance: 307
Referee: D Edmunds

23 September 2006

(BP) Rugby Lions	42 - 31	Blaydon
	Report

Webb Ellis Road
Referee: K White

23 September 2006

Tynedale	25 - 13	Darlington
	Report

Tynedale Park
Attendance: 220
Referee: Revis Phillips

23 September 2006

(BP) West Park St Helens	55 - 20	Leicester Lions
	Report

Red Rocks
Attendance: 140
Referee: Darren Gamage

=== Round 5 ===
30 September 2006

(BP) Blaydon	45 - 14	West Park St Helens
	Report

Crow Trees
Attendance: 160
Referee: Andrew Gardner

30 September 2006

Darlington	23 - 8	Darlington Mowden Park
	Report

Blackwell Meadows
Attendance: 500
Referee: Andrew Taylorson

30 September 2006

Fylde	19 - 13	Rugby Lions (BP)
	Report

Woodlands Memorial Ground
Attendance: 650
Referee: Mick Reid

30 September 2006

(BP) Leicester Lions	22 - 28	Cleckheaton
	Report

Westleigh Park
Attendance: 110
Referee: Chris Seeley

30 September 2006

Macclesfield	20 - 30	Preston Grasshoppers
	Report

Priory Park
Attendance: 326
Referee: Mark Liddell

30 September 2006

Morley	30 - 12	Tynedale
	Report

Scatcherd Lane
Attendance: 220
Referee: Guy Steel Bodger

30 September 2006

Orrell	17 - 26	Hull Ionians (BP)
	Report

Edge Hall Road
Referee: Revis Phillips

=== Round 6 ===
7 October 2006

(BP) Blaydon	36 - 15	Leicester Lions
	Report

Crow Trees
Attendance: 120
Referee: Andrew Taylorson

7 October 2006

(BP) Darlington Mowden Park	38 - 13	Morley
	Report

Yiewsley Drive
Attendance: 200
Referee: Revis Phillips

7 October 2006

Hull Ionians	10 - 5	Cleckheaton (BP)
	Report

Brantingham Park
Attendance: 300
Referee: Ian Robinson

7 October 2006

(BP) Preston Grasshoppers	48 - 18	Orrell
	Report

Lightfoot Green
Attendance: 561
Referee: Rob Sheard

7 October 2006

(BP) Rugby Lions	54 - 7	Darlington
	Report

Webb Ellis Road
Attendance: 268
Referee: Darren Gamage

7 October 2006

(BP) Tynedale	23 - 20	Macclesfield (BP)
	Report

Tynedale Park
Attendance: 200
Referee: Mick Reid

7 October 2006

West Park St Helens	18 - 30	Fylde (BP)
	Report

Red Rocks
Attendance: 200
Referee: D Edmunds

=== Round 7 ===
14 October 2006

(BP) Cleckheaton	13 - 20	Preston Grasshoppers
	Report

Cleckheaton Sports Club
Attendance: 350
Referee: Revis Phillips

14 October 2006

(BP) Darlington	30 - 18	West Park St Helens
	Report

Blackwell Meadows
Attendance: 120
Referee: Mick Reid

14 October 2006

(BP) Fylde	15 - 20	Blaydon
	Report

Woodlands Memorial Ground
Attendance: 350
Referee: Andrew Gardner

14 October 2006

Leicester Lions	21 - 13	Hull Ionians
	Report

Westleigh Park
Attendance: 130
Referee: P.W Davies

14 October 2006

(BP) Macclesfield	29 - 24	Darlington Mowden Park (BP)
	Report

Priory Park
Attendance: 296
Referee: Steve Walters

14 October 2006

Morley	16 - 38	Rugby Lions (BP)
	Report

Scatcherd Lane
Attendance: 265
Referee: Chris Seeley

14 October 2006

(BP) Orrell	13 - 17	Tynedale
	Report

Edge Hall Road
Attendance: 98
Referee: Matthew Daubney

=== Round 8 ===
21 October 2006

(BP) Blaydon	36 - 20	Darlington (BP)
	Report

Crow Trees
Attendance: 410
Referee: Chris Sharp

21 October 2006

(BP) Darlington Mowden Park	73 - 29	Orrell (BP)
	Report

Yiewsley Drive
Attendance: 170
Referee: Brendan Fitzmaurice

21 October 2006

(BP) Fylde	30 - 6	Leicester Lions
	Report

Woodlands Memorial Ground
Attendance: 535
Referee: Mark Liddell

21 October 2006

(BP) Preston Grasshoppers	20 - 24	Hull Ionians
	Report

Lightfoot Green
Attendance: 420
Referee: Mick Reid

21 October 2006

Rugby Lions	18 - 13	Macclesfield (BP)
	Report

Webb Ellis Road
Attendance: 318
Referee: Keith Lewis

21 October 2006

(BP) Tynedale	54 - 12	Cleckheaton
	Report

Tynedale Park
Attendance: 220
Referee: Revis Phillips

21 October 2006

(BP) West Park St Helens	31 - 12	Morley
	Report

Red Rocks
Attendance: 180
Referee: Guy Steel Bodger

=== Round 9 ===
4 November 2006

Cleckheaton	25 - 11	Darlington Mowden Park
	Report

Cleckheaton Sports Club
Attendance: 130
Referee: Rhys Davies

4 November 2006

(BP) Darlington	15 - 18	Fylde
	Report

Blackwell Meadows
Attendance: 200
Referee: Ross Campbell

4 November 2006

Hull Ionians	6 - 35	Tynedale (BP)
	Report

Brantingham Park
Attendance: 200
Referee: Darren Gamage

4 November 2006

Leicester Lions	13 - 9	Preston Grasshoppers (BP)
	Report

Westleigh Park
Attendance: 130
Referee: P.W Davies

4 November 2006

Macclesfield	30 - 18	West Park St Helens
	Report

Priory Park
Attendance: 297
Referee: Steve Harland

4 November 2006

(2BP) Morley	29 - 32	Blaydon (BP)
	Report

Scatcherd Lane
Attendance: 295

4 November 2006

Orrell	14 - 36	Rugby Lions (BP)
	Report

Edge Hall Road
Attendance: 89
Referee: Chris Seeley

=== Round 10 ===
11 November 2006

Blaydon	15 - 6	Macclesfield
	Report

Crow Trees
Attendance: 175
Referee: Matthew Daubney

11 November 2006

(BP) Darlington	29 - 15	Leicester Lions
	Report

Blackwell Meadows
Attendance: 120
Referee: D Edmunds

11 November 2006

(BP) Darlington Mowden Park	30 - 23	Hull Ionians (BP)
	Report

Yiewsley Drive
Attendance: 120
Referee: Rhys Davies

11 November 2006

Fylde	25 - 10	Morley
	Report

Woodlands Memorial Ground
Attendance: 350
Referee: Rob Sheard

11 November 2006

Rugby Lions	11 - 6	Cleckheaton (BP)
	Report

Webb Ellis Road
Attendance: 270
Referee: P.W Davies

11 November 2006

(BP) Tynedale	34 - 8	Preston Grasshoppers
	Report

Tynedale Park
Attendance: 210
Referee: Trevor Fisher

11 November 2006

(BP) West Park St Helens	37 - 19	Orrell
	Report

Red Rocks
Attendance: 250
Referee: Dino Maddern

=== Round 11 ===
25 November 2006

Cleckheaton	12 - 21	West Park St Helens
	Report

Cleckheaton Sports Club
Attendance: 150
Referee: Adrian Hartwell

25 November 2006

Hull Ionians	13 - 35	Rugby Lions (BP)
	Report

Brantingham Park
Attendance: 200
Referee: Rhys Davies

25 November 2006

Leicester Lions	8 - 16	Tynedale
	Report

Westleigh Park
Attendance: 60

25 November 2006

Macclesfield	17 - 34	Fylde (BP)
	Report

Priory Park
Referee: Andrew Taylorson

25 November 2006

Orrell	6 - 42	Blaydon (BP)
	Report

Edge Hall Road
Attendance: 101
Referee: Mick Reid

25 November 2006

Preston Grasshoppers	19 - 19	Darlington Mowden Park
	Report

Lightfoot Green
Attendance: 319
Referee: Matthew Daubney

25 November 2006

Morley	P - P	Darlington

- Postponed. Game rescheduled to 30 December 2006.

=== Round 12 ===
2 December 2006

(BP) Blaydon	24 - 3	Cleckheaton
	Report

Crow Trees
Attendance: 310
Referee: Andrew Taylorson

2 December 2006

Darlington	16 - 15	Macclesfield (BP)
	Report

Blackwell Meadows
Attendance: 100
Referee: Darren Gamage

2 December 2006

(BP) Darlington Mowden Park	37 - 29	Tynedale (BP)
	Report

Yiewsley Drive
Attendance: 166
Referee: Andrew Gardner

2 December 2006

(BP) Fylde	45 - 13	Orrell
	Report

Woodlands Memorial Ground
Attendance: 550
Referee: Guy Steel Bodger

2 December 2006

Morley	16 - 14	Leicester Lions (BP)
	Report

Scatcherd Lane
Attendance: 295
Referee: Luke Pearce

2 December 2006

(2BP) Rugby Lions	27 - 31	Preston Grasshoppers (BP)
	Report

Webb Ellis Road
Attendance: 326
Referee: Chris Seeley

2 December 2006

(BP) West Park St Helens	23 - 27	Hull Ionians (BP)
	Report

Red Rocks
Attendance: 120
Referee: Mick Reid

=== Round 13 ===
16 December 2006

Cleckheaton	15 - 38	Fylde (BP)
	Report

Cleckheaton Sports Club
Attendance: 180
Referee: Mick Reid

16 December 2006

Hull Ionians	3 - 13	Blaydon
	Report

Brantingham Park
Attendance: 150
Referee: Rob White

16 December 2006

Leicester Lions	16 - 10	Darlington Mowden Park (BP)
	Report

Westleigh Park
Attendance: 80
Referee: Steve Harland

16 December 2006

(BP) Macclesfield	27 - 13	Morley
	Report

Priory Park
Referee: Andrew Nicholas

16 December 2006

(2BP) Orrell	29 - 30	Darlington (BP)
	Report

Edge Hall Road
Attendance: 69
Referee: D Edmunds

16 December 2006

Preston Grasshoppers	24 - 19	West Park St Helens (BP)
	Report

Lightfoot Green
Attendance: 305
Referee: Darren Gamage

16 December 2006

(BP) Tynedale	34 - 17	Rugby Lions
	Report

Tynedale Park
Attendance: 160
Referee: Andrew Vertigan

=== Round 14 ===
23 December 2006

Blaydon	10 - 24	Tynedale (BP)
	Report

Crow Trees
Attendance: 810
Referee: Trevor Fisher

23 December 2006

(BP) Darlington	5 - 12	Hull Ionians
	Report

Blackwell Meadows
Attendance: 140
Referee: Rhys Davies

23 December 2006

Fylde	21 - 9	Preston Grasshoppers
	Report

Woodlands Memorial Ground
Attendance: 1,987
Referee: Mark Liddell

23 December 2006

(BP) Leicester Lions	16 - 19	Rugby Lions
	Report

Westleigh Park
Attendance: 200
Referee: Revis Phillips

23 December 2006

(BP) Macclesfield	42 - 19	Orrell
	Report

Priory Park
Referee: P.W Davies

23 December 2006

Morley	19 - 19	Cleckheaton
	Report

Scatcherd Lane
Attendance: 500
Referee: D Edmunds

23 December 2006

(BP) West Park St Helens	12 - 19	Darlington Mowden Park
	Report

Red Rocks
Attendance: 170
Referee: Matthew Daubney

=== Round 11 (rescheduled game) ===
30 December 2006

(BP) Morley	27 - 18	Darlington
	Report

Scatcherd Lane
Attendance: 300
Referee: Andrew Gardner

- Game rescheduled from 25 November 2006.

=== Round 15 ===
6 January 2007

Cleckheaton	19 - 13	Macclesfield (BP)
	Report

Cleckheaton Sports Club
Attendance: 175
Referee: Gareth Hodges

6 January 2007

(BP) Darlington Mowden Park	23 - 24	Blaydon
	Report

Yiewsley Drive
Attendance: 180
Referee: Andrew Taylorson

6 January 2007

Hull Ionians	11 - 8	Morley (BP)
	Report

Brantingham Park
Attendance: 300
Referee: Revis Phillips

6 January 2007

Orrell	0 - 31	Leicester Lions
	Report

Edge Hall Road
Attendance: 110
Referee: Andrew Gardner

6 January 2007

(BP) Preston Grasshoppers	42 - 12	Darlington
	Report

Lightfoot Green
Attendance: 242
Referee: D Edmunds

6 January 2007

Rugby Lions	7 - 3	West Park St Helens (BP)
	Report

Webb Ellis Road
Attendance: 235
Referee: Michael Tutty

6 January 2007

(BP) Tynedale	28 - 6	Fylde
	Report

Tynedale Park
Attendance: 260
Referee: Matthew Daubney

=== Round 16 ===
13 January 2007

(BP) Blaydon	34 - 19	Rugby Lions
	Report

Crow Trees
Referee: Adrian Hartwell

13 January 2007

(BP) Darlington	12 - 19	Tynedale
	Report

Blackwell Meadows
Attendance: 180
Referee: Mick Reid

13 January 2007

Fylde	17 - 10	Darlington Mowden Park (BP)
	Report

Woodlands Memorial Ground
Attendance: 240
Referee: Rhys Davies

13 January 2007

Leicester Lions	15 - 15	West Park St Helens
	Report

Westleigh Park
Attendance: 100
Referee: Matthew Daubney

13 January 2007

(BP) Macclesfield	33 - 10	Hull Ionians
	Report

Priory Park
Referee: Luke Pearce

13 January 2007

(BP) Morley	31 - 27	Preston Grasshoppers (BP)
	Report

Scatcherd Lane
Attendance: 300
Referee: Andrew Gardner

13 January 2007

Orrell	10 - 10	Cleckheaton
	Report

Edge Hall Road
Attendance: 69
Referee: Eric Woodmason

=== Round 17 ===
27 January 2007

Cleckheaton	3 - 28	Leicester Lions
	Report

Cleckheaton Sports Club
Attendance: 165
Referee: James Fisher

27 January 2007

(BP) Darlington Mowden Park	30 - 27	Darlington (2BP)
	Report

Yiewsley Drive
Attendance: 300
Referee: Andrew Gardner

27 January 2007

(BP) Hull Ionians	42 - 7	Orrell
	Report

Brantingham Park
Attendance: 250
Referee: Rhys Davies

27 January 2007

(BP) Preston Grasshoppers	32 - 18	Macclesfield
	Report

Lightfoot Green
Attendance: 320
Referee: Revis Phillips

27 January 2007

Rugby Lions	22 - 15	Fylde (BP)
	Report

Webb Ellis Road
Attendance: 302
Referee: Chris Seeley

27 January 2007

Tynedale	20 - 18	Morley (BP)
	Report

Tynedale Park
Attendance: 210
Referee: Mick Reid

27 January 2007

West Park St Helens	23 - 19	Blaydon (BP)
	Report

Red Rocks
Attendance: 260
Referee: D Edmunds

=== Round 18 ===
3 February 2007

Cleckheaton	16 - 41	Hull Ionians (BP)
	Report

Cleckheaton Sports Club
Attendance: 206
Referee: Mick Reid

3 February 2007

(BP) Darlington	19 - 22	Rugby Lions
	Report

Blackwell Meadows
Attendance: 100
Referee: Richard Phillips

3 February 2007

Fylde	0 - 8	West Park St Helens
	Report

Woodlands Memorial Ground
Attendance: 310
Referee: Ian Robinson

3 February 2007

(BP) Leicester Lions	51 - 36	Blaydon (BP)
	Report

Westleigh Park
Attendance: 120
Referee: Steve Walters

3 February 2007

(BP) Macclesfield	17 - 23	Tynedale
	Report

Priory Park
Attendance: 183
Referee: Ross Campbell

3 February 2007

(BP) Morley	28 - 14	Darlington Mowden Park
	Report

Scatcherd Lane
Attendance: 250
Referee: Andrew Taylorson

3 February 2007

Orrell	0 - 53	Preston Grasshoppers (BP)
	Report

Edge Hall Road
Attendance: 68
Referee: Mark Liddell

=== Round 19 ===
17 February 2007

Blaydon	15 - 6	Fylde
	Report

Crow Trees
Attendance: 240
Referee: Andrew Vertigan

17 February 2007

(BP) Darlington Mowden Park	29 - 11	Macclesfield
	Report

Yiewsley Drive
Attendance: 280
Referee: Matthew Daubney

17 February 2007

(BP) Hull Ionians	17 - 20	Leicester Lions
	Report

Brantingham Park
Attendance: 300
Referee: Revis Phillips

17 February 2007

(BP) Preston Grasshoppers	42 - 15	Cleckheaton
	Report

Lightfoot Green
Attendance: 452
Referee: Guy Steel Bodger

17 February 2007

Rugby Lions	19 - 17	Morley (BP)
	Report

Webb Ellis Road
Attendance: 380
Referee: Andrew Bickle

17 February 2007

(BP) Tynedale	102 - 0	Orrell
	Report

Tynedale Park
Attendance: 225
Referee: Mick Reid

17 February 2007

(BP) West Park St Helens	23 - 24	Darlington (BP)
	Report

Red Rocks
Attendance: 100
Referee: Andrew Gardner

=== Round 20 ===
24 February 2007

Cleckheaton	7 - 36	Tynedale (BP)
	Report

Cleckheaton Sports Club
Attendance: 210
Referee: Andrew Gardner

24 February 2007

(BP) Darlington	10 - 15	Blaydon
	Report

Blackwell Meadows
Attendance: 160
Referee: Revis Phillips

24 February 2007

Hull Ionians	9 - 38	Preston Grasshoppers (BP)
	Report

Brantingham Park
Attendance: 200
Referee: Mick Reid

24 February 2007

(BP) Leicester Lions	24 - 8	Fylde
	Report

Westleigh Park
Attendance: 100
Referee: Ian Robinson

24 February 2007

(BP) Macclesfield	32 - 23	Rugby Lions
	Report

Priory Park
Attendance: 232
Referee: Matthew Daubney

24 February 2007

Morley	24 - 15	West Park St Helens
	Report

Scatcherd Lane
Attendance: 300
Referee: Trevor Fisher

24 February 2007

Orrell	9 - 25	Darlington Mowden Park
	Report

Edge Hall Road
Attendance: 130
Referee: Guy Steel Bodger

=== Round 21 ===
3 March 2007

(BP) Blaydon	33 - 26	Morley (2BP)
	Report

Crow Trees
Attendance: 220
Referee: Trevor Fisher

3 March 2007

Darlington Mowden Park	19 - 8	Cleckheaton
	Report

Yiewsley Drive
Attendance: 130
Referee: Revis Phillips

3 March 2007

(BP) Fylde	45 - 13	Darlington
	Report

Woodlands Memorial Ground
Attendance: 304
Referee: Paul Knowles

3 March 2007

(BP) Preston Grasshoppers	43 - 14	Leicester Lions
	Report

Lightfoot Green
Attendance: 468
Referee: Darren Gamage

3 March 2007

(BP) Rugby Lions	39 - 7	Orrell
	Report

Webb Ellis Road
Attendance: 263
Referee: Philip Davis

3 March 2007

(BP) Tynedale	43 - 7	Hull Ionians
	Report

Tynedale Park
Attendance: 240
Referee: Mark Liddell

3 March 2007

(BP) West Park St Helens	24 - 18	Macclesfield (BP)
	Report

Red Rocks
Attendance: 200
Referee: Eric Woodmason

=== Round 22 ===
17 March 2007

Cleckheaton	0 - 24	Rugby Lions
	Report

Cleckheaton Sports Club
Referee: Revis Phillips

17 March 2007

(BP) Hull Ionians	32 - 8	Darlington Mowden Park
	Report

Brantingham Park
Attendance: 150
Referee: Rhys Davies

17 March 2007

Leicester Lions	24 - 19	Darlington (BP)
	Report

Westleigh Park
Attendance: 120
Referee: Andrew Bickle

17 March 2007

Macclesfield	10 - 22	Blaydon (BP)
	Report

Priory Park
Attendance: 154
Referee: Andrew Gardner

17 March 2007

(BP) Morley	32 - 16	Fylde
	Report

Scatcherd Lane
Attendance: 250
Referee: Matthew Daubney

17 March 2007

Orrell	18 - 18	West Park St Helens
	Report

Edge Hall Road
Attendance: 75
Referee: Mick Reid

17 March 2007

Preston Grasshoppers	22 - 10	Tynedale
	Report

Lightfoot Green
Attendance: 487
Referee: Trevor Fisher

=== Round 23 ===
24 March 2007

(BP) Blaydon	124 - 0	Orrell
	Report

Crow Trees
Attendance: 200
Referee: D Edmunds

24 March 2007

Darlington	20 - 30	Morley (BP)
	Report

Blackwell Meadows
Attendance: 110
Referee: Revis Phillips

24 March 2007

Darlington Mowden Park	19 - 12	Preston Grasshoppers (BP)
	Report

Yiewsley Drive
Attendance: 176
Referee: Matthew Daubney

24 March 2007

(BP) Fylde	27 - 14	Macclesfield
	Report

Woodlands Memorial Ground
Attendance: 420
Referee: Andrew Taylorson

24 March 2007

Rugby Lions	20 - 31	Hull Ionians (BP)
	Report

Webb Ellis Road
Attendance: 263
Referee: Trevor Fisher

24 March 2007

(BP) Tynedale	37 - 12	Leicester Lions
	Report

Tynedale Park
Attendance: 260
Referee: Mick Reid

24 March 2007

(BP) West Park St Helens	41 - 22	Cleckheaton
	Report

Red Rocks
Attendance: 200
Referee: Brendan Fitzmaurice

=== Round 24 ===
31 March 2007

Cleckheaton	5 - 57	Blaydon (BP)
	Report

Cleckheaton Sports Club
Attendance: 150
Referee: Revis Phillips

31 March 2007

(BP) Hull Ionians	27 - 15	West Park St Helens
	Report

Brantingham Park
Attendance: 200
Referee: Andrew Vertigan

31 March 2007

(BP) Leicester Lions	36 - 12	Morley
	Report

Westleigh Park
Attendance: 150
Referee: Mark Liddell

31 March 2007

(BP) Macclesfield	33 - 16	Darlington
	Report

Priory Park
Attendance: 200
Referee: Matthew Daubney

31 March 2007

Orrell	0 - 106	Fylde (BP)
	Report

Edge Hall Road
Attendance: 99
Referee: Simon Lazenby

31 March 2007

Preston Grasshoppers	21 - 37	Rugby Lions (BP)
	Report

Lightfoot Green
Attendance: 443
Referee: Chris Sharp

31 March 2007

(BP) Tynedale	67 - 3	Darlington Mowden Park
	Report

Tynedale Park
Attendance: 240
Referee: Rhys Davies

=== Round 25 ===
14 April 2007

(BP) Blaydon	41 - 10	Hull Ionians
	Report

Crow Trees
Attendance: 700
Referee: Trevor Fisher

14 April 2007

Darlington Mowden Park	13 - 22	Leicester Lions
	Report

Yiewsley Drive
Attendance: 170
Referee: Darren Gamage

14 April 2007

(BP) Fylde	24 - 9	Cleckheaton
	Report

Woodlands Memorial Ground
Attendance: 595
Referee: James Fisher

14 April 2007

Morley	15 - 10	Macclesfield (BP)
	Report

Scatcherd Lane
Attendance: 250
Referee: Steve Walters

14 April 2007

Rugby Lions	7 - 24	Tynedale
	Report

Webb Ellis Road
Attendance: 374
Referee: Llyr Apgeraint-Roberts

14 April 2007

(BP) West Park St Helens	29 - 38	Preston Grasshoppers (BP)
	Report

Red Rocks
Attendance: 200
Referee: Guy Steel Bodger

14 April 2007

Darlington	P - P	Orrell

- Postponed. Game rescheduled to 28 April 2007.

=== Round 26 ===
21 April 2007

(BP) Cleckheaton	26 - 29	Darlington
	Report

Cleckheaton Sports Club
Attendance: 175
Referee: Mick Reid

21 April 2007

Darlington Mowden Park	24 - 24	Rugby Lions
	Report

Yiewsley Drive
Attendance: 180
Referee: Richard Kelly

21 April 2007

Hull Ionians	19 - 48	Fylde (BP)
	Report

Brantingham Park
Attendance: 500
Referee: Philip Davis

21 April 2007

Macclesfield	30 - 26	Leicester Lions (2BP)
	Report

Priory Park
Attendance: 257
Referee: Andrew Bickle

21 April 2007

(BP) Orrell	17 - 24	Morley
	Report

Edge Hall Road
Attendance: 505
Referee: Revis Phillips

21 April 2007

(BP) Preston Grasshoppers	20 - 27	Blaydon (BP)
	Report

Lightfoot Green
Attendance: 582
Referee: Richard Draper

21 April 2007

(BP) Tynedale	28 - 6	West Park St Helens
	Report

Tynedale Park
Attendance: 410
Referee: D Edmunds

=== Round 25 (rescheduled game) ===
28 April 2007

(BP) Darlington	77 - 0	Orrell
	Report

Blackwell Meadows
Attendance: 120
Referee: Mark Liddell

- Game rescheduled from 14 April 2007.

=== Promotion play-off ===
The league runners up of National Division Three South and North would meet in a playoff game for promotion to National Division Two. Westcombe Park were the southern division runners up and as they had a superior league record than northern runners-up, Tynedale, they hosted the play-off match.

28 May 2007
15:00

Westcombe Park	36 - 20	Tynedale

Goddington Dene

== Total season attendances ==
Club	Home Games	Total	Average	Highest	Lowest	% Capacity
Blaydon	12 (Note: Missing home attendance v Rugby Lions on 13 January 2007.)	3,765	314	810	120	16%
Cleckheaton	12 (Note: Missing home attendance v Rugby Lions on 17 March 2007.)	2,941	245	850	130	
Darlington	13	2,150	165	500	100	6%
Darlington Mowden Park	13	2,452	189	300	120	
Fylde	13	7,176	552	1,987	240	7%
Hull Ionians	13	3,250	250	500	150	17%
Leicester Lions	13	1,515	117	200	60	6%
Macclesfield	9 (Note: Missing home attendances v Fylde on 25 November 2006, Morley on 16 December 2006, Orrell on 23 December 2006 and Hull Ionians on 13 January 2007.)	2,282	254	337	154	20%
Morley	12 (Note: Missing home attendance v Orrell on 2 September 2006.)	3,500	292	500	220	5%
Orrell	12 (Note: Missing home attendance v Hull Ionians on 30 September 2006.)	1,512	126	505	68	2%
Preston Grasshoppers	13	5,711	439	805	242	20%
Rugby Lions	11 (Note: Missing home attendances v v Darlington Mowden Park on 2 September 2006 and Blaydon on 23 September 2006.)	3,352	305	380	235	8%
Tynedale	13	3,155	243	410	160	12%
West Park St Helens	12 (Note: Missing home attendance v Tynedale on 2 September 2006.)	2,155	180	260	100	

== Individual statistics ==
- Note that points scorers includes tries as well as conversions, penalties and drop goals.

=== Top points scorers ===
Rank	Player	Team	Appearances	Points
1	(England) James Hawken	Rugby Lions	26	266
2	(England) John Armstrong	Fylde	26	247
3	(Wales) Anthony Mellalieu	Darlington Mowden Park / Blaydon	22	217
4	(England) Andrew Soutar	West Park St Helens	22	206
5	(England) Paul Bailey	Preston Grasshoppers	22	202
6	(England) Ross Winney	Macclesfield	23	200
7	(England) Phillip Belgian	Tynedale	18	183
8	(England) Glenn Boyd	Morley	26	177
9	(England) Nick Royle	Fylde	22	155
10	(England) Karl Birch	Hull Ionians	21	141

=== Top try scorers ===
Rank	Player	Team	Appearances	Tries
1	(England) Nick Royle	Fylde	22	31
2	(Wales) Andrew Fenby	Blaydon	24	25
3	(England) Peter Altona	Blaydon	22	20
4	(England) Ade Hales	Rugby Lions	24	18
5	(England) Oliver Viney	Preston Grasshoppers	24	16
6	(England) Craig Field	Morley	24	14
7	(England) Ralph Smith	Blaydon	18	13
7	(England) Will Massey	Tynedale	25	13
8	(Tonga) Feofaaku Lea	Leicester Lions	10	12
8	(England) Benjamin Duncan	Tynedale	19	12
8	(England) Dominic Wareing	Rugby Lions	25	12

== Season records ==
=== Team ===
Largest home win — 124 pts

124 - 0 Blaydon at home to Orrell on 24 March 2007

Largest away win — 106 pts

106 - 0 Fylde away to Orrell on 31 March 2007

Most points scored — 124 pts

124 - 0 Blaydon at home to Orrell on 24 March 2007

Most tries in a match — 18

Blaydon at home to Orrell on 24 March 2007

Most conversions in a match — 17

Blaydon at home to Orrell on 24 March 2007

Most penalties in a match — 5 (x2)

Tynedale away to West Park St Helens on 2 September 2006
Rugby Lions at home to Fylde on 27 January 2007

Most drop goals in a match — 2

Fylde at home to Blaydon on 14 October 2006

=== Player ===
Most points in a match — 35

(England) Nick Royle for Fylde away to Orrell on 31 March 2007

Most tries in a match — 7

(England) Nick Royle for Fylde away to Orrell on 31 March 2007

Most conversions in a match — 17

(Wales) Anthony Mellalieu for Blaydon at home to Orrell on 24 March 2007

Most penalties in a match — 5 (x2)

(England) Phillip Belgian for Tynedale away to West Park St Helens on 2 September 2006
(England) James Hawken for Rugby Lions at home to Fylde on 27 January 2007

Most drop goals in a match — 2 (x2)

(England) John Armstrong for Fylde at home to Blaydon on 14 October 2006

=== Attendances ===
Highest — 1,987

Fylde at home to Preston Grasshoppers on 23 December 2006

Lowest — 60

Leicester Lions at home to Tynedale on 25 November 2006

Highest Average Attendance — 552

Fylde

Lowest Average Attendance — 117

Leicester Lions

== See also ==
- English Rugby Union Leagues
- English rugby union system
- Rugby union in England
