= Chris Martin (rugby union) =

English rugby union player

- Full name: Ronald Christopher Martin
- Born: 27 June 1961 (age 65) Truro, Cornwall, England
- Height: 6 ft 3 in (191 cm)

Rugby union career
- Position: Fullback
International career
Years	Team	Apps	(Points)
1985	England	4	(0)

Ronald Christopher Martin (born 27 June 1961) is an English former rugby union international who represented England in four Test matches during the 1980s.

A native of Penryn in Cornwall, he was born in Truro, Martin played his rugby for Bath and his home town of Penryn. He made his international appearances in the 1985 Five Nations Championship, where he was England's starting fullback in all four matches. He proved at times susceptible under the high ball and made a particularly costly mistake against Wales which led to a match turning try. These remained his only Test caps for England, although he did retain his place in the squad for the 1985 New Zealand tour.

== See also ==
- List of England national rugby union players
