= Austin Sheppard =

English rugby union player (born 1950)

- Born: 1 May 1950 (age 76) Bristol, England
- School: Colston’s School, Bristol

Rugby union career
- Position: Prop
International career
Years	Team	Apps	(Points)
1981–85	England	2	(0)

Austin Sheppard (born 1 May 1950) is an English former rugby union international who represented England in two Test matches during the 1980s.

A Bristol native, Sheppard is a graduate of Colston's School. He played rugby as a prop and appeared in numerous games for Bristol, including the club's 1982–83 John Player Cup triumph.

Sheppard, who was a funeral director by profession, debuted for England in a 1981 Five Nations Test against Wales in Cardiff. It wasn't until 1985 that he got another opportunity, with Wales again his opponent. He remained in the England squad for the tour of New Zealand that followed.

One of his sons Max has followed in his footsteps but in coaching rugby. By taking North Bristol RFC undefeated in the 2022/23 season which was capped off with a trip to Twickenham with them winning the Pappa Johns National Cup.

== See also ==
- List of England national rugby union players
