= Brian Ashton (rugby union) =

English rugby union footballer & coach

Brian Ashton MBE
- Born: William Brian Ashton; 3 September 1946 (age 80) Leigh, Greater Manchester, England

Rugby union career
- Position: Scrum-half
- Current team: Vale of Lune RUFC
Amateur team(s)
Years	Team	Apps	(Points)
1965–	Tyldesley RUFC		
19??-1973	Fylde		
1973–	Orrell		
- AS Montferrand
- Rome
197?–1980	Milan		
Coaching career
- Years: Team
- 1980–1988: Stonyhurst College
- 1985: England (asst.)
- 1989–1994: King's School, Bruton
- 1989–1994: Bath Rugby (asst.)
- 1994–1996: Bath Rugby
- 1996–1998: Ireland
- 1998–2002: England A
- 2005: Bath Rugby
- 2006–2008: England

William Brian Ashton MBE (born 3 September 1946) is an English rugby union coach and former player. He has been head coach of the England and Ireland national teams.

== Youth ==
Ashton was born 3 September 1946 in Leigh, Lancashire to a textile weaver mother and coal miner father Albert, who played professional rugby league on the weekends for Leigh RLFC in 1940. He earned a place at Leigh Grammar School – one of the few local schools to teach and play rugby union over rugby league.

== Playing history ==
After leaving school, Ashton started working for Trustee Savings Bank in their international banking division then Midland Bank at Farnworth, Bolton. Keith Elleray, his old games master from Leigh Grammar, took him to Tyldesley RUFC, where Ashton played fly-half in his first season in 1965–6, before Elleray retired and Ashton took over his preferred position of scrum-half for 1966–67.

Although offered professional terms by various rugby league clubs, Ashton moved to Fylde – where his teammates included Roger Uttley and Bill Beaumont – and then to Orrell from 1973 to be closer to his Leigh home. On finding his chances limited, he started training as a school teacher, where his first posts were at Ashton High School, brought about by the head master's requirement to introduce rugby, and Hutton Grammar School, Preston.

Ashton was in the England squad which toured Australia in 1975, playing in one game, but was never capped – the closest he came was as an unused replacement on 15 March 1975 against Scotland. He also played representative rugby for Lancashire, England North and the Barbarians.

His friend Dick Greenwood – England international and later father of Will Greenwood – persuaded Ashton to extend his career by playing in France for AS Montferrand, and then in Italy with Roma and Milan. As a result, he speaks Italian.

== Coaching career ==
Ashton started at Leigh college 1980–81 and turned the side into a formidable team that rucked the ball at speed due to a lack of size in the pack. He was persuaded in 1981 to take up the position of history teacher and rugby master by then assistant-bursar Dick Greenwood at Stonyhurst College where Kyran Bracken was a pupil at the time and to whom he taught history. His local teaching counterparts included Ray French.

Ashton met Jack Rowell in the summer of 1985, when he toured New Zealand as assistant coach with England A. Four years later Ashton was offered an accepted a job as backs coach job at Bath, moving to teach history and coach various sports at King's School, Bruton, Somerset from 1989, where his wife also worked as a teacher.

Working under Jack Rowell, he helped establish Bath as the dominant team in English rugby for a decade to the mid-1990s. He took over as head coach from Rowell in 1994 and led Bath to the Courage League title in 1996.

Ashton then had a brief and unsuccessful spell as National Coach of Ireland from 1997 to 1998. He had been awarded a six-year contract by the IRFU but resigned 12 months later after a series of disappointing results, and against a background where arguments or disagreements with the team manager, Pat Whelan, were frequently aired in public.

Ashton was Clive Woodward's assistant with England from 1998 to 2002 and was the RFU's National Academy Manager from 2002 to 2005. In this role Ashton played a key part in the launch of England Rugby's National Academy system, creating the Junior and Senior National Academies to develop the most talented players at England A, Sevens, Under 21 and Under 19 level. Ashton also coached some of these feeder teams, including England A.

Ashton returned to Bath as head coach at the start of 2006 but was appointed as England attack coach from May 2006 to assist head coach Andy Robinson, alongside forwards' coach John Wells and defence coach Mike Ford.

In December 2006 Robinson was dismissed, and Ashton was appointed England head coach. He chose Phil Vickery as his captain. Ashton won his first two games in charge of the England team, firstly the Calcutta Cup tie against Scotland and secondly beating Italy at Twickenham but led the English team to a crushing defeat against the Irish National Team on his third outing. The 43–13 defeat by Ireland was England's worst ever defeat by Ireland in the 132 years of competition between the two sides.

England's 2007 Rugby World Cup campaign started badly: the team only narrowly beat the amateurs of the United States, and went on to lose 36–0 to South Africa. However, having finished their group as runners up, they recorded a shock victory over Australia, won a very tight semi-final against France 14–9, and lost a closely fought final to South Africa 15–6. Despite criticism of his management, Ashton was reconfirmed as manager of England with an indefinite length contract, on 20 December 2007.

England finished second in the 2008 Six Nations, losing games to Wales and Scotland. On 16 April 2008 Martin Johnson was appointed England team manager with effect from 1 July 2008, with Ashton leaving the post immediately. Ashton was offered the role of head coach of the RFU's National Academy but declined this position.

He was appointed a Member of the Order of the British Empire (MBE) in the 2008 New Year Honours.

In September 2008 he was appointed director of coaching at the University of Bath and also successfully coached Oxford University to victory in the 2008 Varsity match.

In June 2010 Ashton returned to his old club Fylde to become a coaching consultant to the senior squad. He said he is prepared to contribute as much time as he can spare to assisting Head Coach Mark Nelson in the development of Fylde's senior squad. Fylde won National League 2 North 10/11 and Ashton signed for Fylde for the 2011/12 season as Technical Director.

Ashton has previously said, "My main strength is as a coach. I see my job as improving players individually, to do the technical work with them, and also to establish the environment, the framework, in which the players operate." Ashton's philosophy is that the backs comprise three creative forces (the scrum-half, the fly-half and the inside-centre) and four penetrative finishers (the outside- centre, the two wings and the full-back).

=== Teams coached ===
Team	Role	Date from:	Date to:	Notes
Stonyhurst College	Rugby coach	1980	1988	
England	Assistant coach	1985	1985	Tour of New Zealand
King's School, Bruton	Rugby coach	1987	1994	
Bath Rugby	Assistant coach	1989	1994	
Bath Rugby	Head coach	1994	1996	
Ireland	Head coach	1996	1998	
England	Assistant coach	1998	2002	Managed England A and Churchill Cup team
England	National Academy Manager	2002	2005	
Bath Rugby	Head coach	2005	2005	
England	Attack coach	2006	2006	
England	Head coach	2006	2008	took team to final of 2007 Rugby World Cup

== International matches as head coach ==
Note: World Rankings Column shows the World Ranking England was placed at on the following Monday after each of their matches

Matches (2007–2008)
Match	Date	Opposition	Venue	Score (Eng.–Opponent)	Competition	Captain	World Rank
2007

Sporting positions
Preceded by (New Zealand) Murray Kidd	Irish national rugby coach 1997–1998	Succeeded by (New Zealand) Warren Gatland
Preceded by (England) Andy Robinson	English national rugby coach 2006–2008	Succeeded by (England) Martin Johnson
