= Paul Huntsman =

English rugby union player (born 1957)

Robert Paul Huntsman (born 5 May 1957) is a former English rugby union player. Huntsman played for Headingley as a prop and won two international caps for the England national rugby union team, both during the 1985 England rugby union tour of New Zealand.
