= National League 2 North =

Men's rugby union league in England

National Two North
- Founded: 1987; 39 years ago
- Country: England
- Number of clubs: 14
- Level on pyramid: Level 4
- Promotion to: National League 1
- Relegation to: Regional 1: Midlands; North East; North West
- Current champions: Sheffield (1st title) (2025–26)
- Most championships: Hull Ionians, Macclesfield (3 titles)
- Website: nationalleaguerugby.com
- Current: 2026–27 National League 2 North

National League 2 North is one of three level four leagues in the men’s English rugby union system and provides semi-professional competition for teams in Northern England. The remainder of England is covered by the two counterpart leagues National League 2 East and National League 2 West. The champion club is promoted to National One. Relegation is to either the Regional 1 Midlands, Regional 1 North East or Regional 1 North West, depending on their location. Rotherham Titans are the current champions.

Before September 2009, it was known as National Division Three North. From 2009 to 2010 the Rugby Football Union (RFU) expanded the league from fourteen to sixteen teams. Each team played thirty league games on a home and away basis. The 2019–20 season ended before all the matches were completed because of the coronavirus pandemic and the RFU used a best playing record formula to decide the final table.

The RFU approved a new structure for the National Leagues from the 2022–23 season. The league is reduced to fourteen teams, there will be a two-week break over Christmas and protected weekend breaks through the season. The competition structure will be reviewed every three years.

== Structure ==
The league consists of fourteen teams and each plays the others on a home and away basis, to make a total of 26 matches each. The champions are promoted to National League 1 while the runners up go into a four team promotion-relegation playoff with the runners up from National League 2 East and National League 2 West and the 11th placed side in National League 1.

The bottom two teams are relegated to Regional 1 North East or Regional 1 North West; depending on their location, while the 12th placed side go into the four team Regional 1 playoffs with the 12th placed sides from National 2 East and National 2 North, as well as the Regional 1 playoff winners.

The results of the matches contribute points to the league as follows:

- 4 points are awarded for a win
- 2 points are awarded for a draw
- 0 points are awarded for a loss, however
- 1 losing (bonus) point is awarded to a team that loses a match by 7 points or fewer
- 1 additional (bonus) point is awarded to a team scoring 4 tries or more in a match.

== Current season ==
=== Participating teams and locations ===
Team	Ground	Capacity	City/Area	Previous season
Billingham	Greenwood Road	1,500 (100 seats)	Billingham, County Durham	10th
Chester	Hare Lane	2,000 (500 seats)	Chester, Cheshire	Level transfer from National League 2 West (11th)
Darlington Mowden Park	The Darlington Arena	25,500	Darlington, County Durham	5th
Fylde	Woodlands Memorial Ground	7,500 (500 seats)	Lytham St. Annes, Lancashire	6th
Harrogate	Rudding Lane	2,000	Harrogate, North Yorkshire	Promoted from Regional 1 North East (3rd – play-off winner)
Heath	West Vale		West Vale, Halifax, West Yorkshire	Promoted from Regional 1 North East (champions)
Huddersfield	Lockwood Park	1,500 (500 seats)	Huddersfield, South Yorkshire	Promoted from Regional 1 North West (champions)
Hull Ionians	Brantingham Park	1,500 (240 seats)	Brantingham, East Riding	4th
Otley	Cross Green	7,000 (852 seats)	Otley, Leeds, West Yorkshire	11th
Preston Grasshoppers	Lightfoot Green	2,250 (250 seats)	Preston, Lancashire	9th
Sedgley Park	Park Lane	3,000	Whitefield, Bury, Greater Manchester	Relegated from National League 1 (13th)
Sheffield Tigers	Dore Moor	1,000	Sheffield, South Yorkshire	8th
Tynedale	Tynedale Park	2,000 (400 seats)	Corbridge, Northumberland	2nd
Wharfedale	The Avenue	2,000	Threshfield, North Yorkshire	7th

Locations of the 2026–27 National League 2 North teams

== Current league table ==
2026–27 National League 2 North table
Pos	Team	Pld	W	D	L	PF	PA	PD	TB	LB	Pts	Qualification
1	Billingham	0	0	0	0	0	0	0	0	0	0	Promotion place
2	Chester	0	0	0	0	0	0	0	0	0	0	Promotion play-off
3	Darlington Mowden Park	0	0	0	0	0	0	0	0	0	0	
4	Fylde	0	0	0	0	0	0	0	0	0	0	
5	Harrogate	0	0	0	0	0	0	0	0	0	0	
6	Heath	0	0	0	0	0	0	0	0	0	0	
7	Huddersfield	0	0	0	0	0	0	0	0	0	0	
8	Hull Ionians	0	0	0	0	0	0	0	0	0	0	
9	Otley	0	0	0	0	0	0	0	0	0	0	
10	Preston Grasshoppers	0	0	0	0	0	0	0	0	0	0	
11	Sedgley Park	0	0	0	0	0	0	0	0	0	0	
12	Sheffield Tigers	0	0	0	0	0	0	0	0	0	0	Relegation play-off
13	Tynedale	0	0	0	0	0	0	0	0	0	0	Relegation place
14	Wharfedale	0	0	0	0	0	0	0	0	0	0	Relegation place

Updated to match(es) played on 2 September 2026. Source: National League Rugby
Rules for classification: If teams are level at any stage, tiebreakers are applied in the following order:
1. Number of matches won
2. Number of matches drawn
3. Difference between points for and against
4. Total number of points for
5. Aggregate number of points scored in matches between tied teams
6. Number of matches won excluding the first match, then the second and so on until the tie is settled

== National Two North honours ==
List of National Two North honours
Season	No of teams	Champions	Runner–up	Relegated teams	League name
1987–88	11	Rugby	Durham City	Solihull, Derby, Birkenhead Park	Area League North
1988–89	11	Roundhay	Broughton Park	Birmingham	Area League North
1989–90	11	Broughton Park	Morley	No relegation (Note: As no northern teams from National 3 were relegated into the division, there was no relegation.)	Area League North
1990–91	13	Otley	Lichfield	Birmingham & Solihull, Stoke-on-Trent	National 4 North
1991–92	13	Aspatria	Hereford	Vale of Lune, Northern	National 4 North
1992–93	13	Harrogate	Rotherham	Towcestrians	National 4 North
1993–94	10	Clifton	Harrogate	Sheffield (to 5 North), Sudbury (to 5 South)	Courage National League 4 (Note: This year there was a league restructure with a new league (Courage National League 4) becoming the new tier 4. Courage National 4 contained the previous season's top teams from National 4 North and National 4 South with the remaining teams joining lower tier teams as part of Courage League Division 5 (which retained the North/South divisions). This structure continued for until the end of 1996 when the league reverted to the old system.)
1994–95	10	Rotherham	Reading	Askeans (to 5 South), Broughton Park (to 5 North)	Courage National League 4
1995–96	10	Exeter	London Welsh (Note: The top eight teams were all promoted to the re-organised, sixteen team, Courage League Division 3 for season 1996–97.)	Aspatria (to 4 North), Plymouth Albion (to 4 South)	Courage National League 4
1996–97	14	Worcester	Birmingham & Solihull	Stoke-on-Trent, Hereford	National 4 North
1997–98	14	Birmingham & Solihull	Manchester	No relegation	National 2 North
1998–99	14	Preston Grasshoppers	Stourbridge	Winnington Park, Lichfield, Hinckley	National 2 North
1999–00	14	Kendal	Stourbridge	Sheffield	National 2 North
2000–01	14	Stourbridge	Sedgley Park	Walsall, Aspatria	National 3 North
2001–02	14	Doncaster	Dudley Kingswinford	Whitchurch, Morley, Sandal, West Hartlepool	National 3 North
2002–03	14	Nuneaton	New Brighton	Bedford Athletic, Broadstreet, Hull Ionians, Scunthorpe	National 3 North
2003–04	14	Waterloo	Halifax	Preston Grasshoppers, Liverpool St Helens, Longton	National 3 North
2004–05	14	Halifax	Macclesfield	Rugby Lions, Dudley Kingswinford, Bedford Athletic	National 3 North
2005–06	14	Bradford & Bingley	Nuneaton	New Brighton, Kendal	National 3 North
2006–07	14	Blaydon	Tynedale	Darlington, Cleckheaton, Orrell	National 3 North
2007–08	14	Tynedale	Darlington Mowden Park	Morley, West Park St Helens, Beverley	National 3 North
2008–09	14	Nuneaton	Caldy	Darlington Mowden Park, Halifax	National 3 North
2009–10	16	Macclesfield	Loughborough Students	Waterloo, Bradford & Bingley	National League 2 North
2010–11	16	Fylde	Loughborough Students	Morley, Rugby Lions, Manchester	National League 2 North
2011–12	16	Loughborough Students	Caldy	Harrogate, Nuneaton, Kendal	National League 2 North
2012–13	16	Hull Ionians	Stourbridge	Westoe, Stockport, Huddersfield	National League 2 North
2013–14	16	Macclesfield	Darlington Mowden Park	Sheffield Tigers, Bromsgrove, Dudley Kingswinford	National League 2 North
2014–15	16	Hull Ionians	Ampthill	Birmingham & Solihull, Hull, Stockport	National League 2 North
2015–16	16	Macclesfield	Sedgley Park	Huddersfield, Broadstreet, Sandal	National League 2 North
2016–17	16	Caldy	Sale	Preston Grasshoppers, Scunthorpe, Harrogate	National League 2 North
2017–18	16	Sale FC	Sedgley Park	Sheffield, Blaydon, Luctonians	National League 2 North
2018–19	16	Hull Ionians	Chester	Peterborough Lions, South Leicester, Macclesfield	National League 2 North
2019–20	16	Caldy	Fylde	Scunthorpe, Preston Grasshoppers, Otley	National League 2 North
2020–21	16	Cancelled due to COVID-19 pandemic in the United Kingdom.			National League 2 North
2021–22	16	Hull	Sedgley Park	No relegation owing to league reorganisation	National League 2 North
2022–23	14	Sedgley Park	Fylde	Blaydon and Harrogate	National League 2 North
2023–24	14	Rotherham Titans	Leeds Tykes	Huddersfield (Note: Only 14th place Huddersfield would be relegated at the end of the 2023–24 season. This was because of the liquidation of RFU Championship side Jersey Reds in September 2023, which meant that the best 13th placed side would escape relegation, in this case National League 2 North side Hull Ionians.)	National League 2 North
2024–25	14	Leeds Tykes	Sheffield	Harrogate (Note: Normally two sides would be relegated from National League 2 North but due to reorganisation of the RFU Championship for the 2025–26 season, one 13th placed side from tier 4 would be exempt from relegation, which ended up being Billingham due to a superior record to their counterparts in National 2 East and National 2 West.)	National League 2 North
2025–26	14	Sheffield	Tynedale	Hull, Scunthorpe, Rossendale	National League 2 North
2026–27	14				National League 2 North
Green backgrounds are promotion places.

== Promotion play-offs ==
Until the 2018–19 season, there was a play-off between the league runners-up of National League 2 North and National League 2 South, for the third and final promotion place to National League 1. The team with the superior league record having home advantage in the tie. Southern teams have been more successful with fourteen wins to the northern teams four, while the home side has won thirteen teams to the away sides five.

National Two promotion play-off results
Season	Home team	Score	Away team	Venue	Attendance
2000–01	Sedgley Park (N)	40–23	Launceston (S)	Park Lane, Whitefield, Greater Manchester	1,500
2001–02	Launceston (S)	26–0	Dudley Kingswinford (N)	Polson Bridge, Launceston, Cornwall	2,500
2002–03	Lydney (S)	21–7	New Brighton (N)	Regentsholme, Lydney, Gloucestershire	
2003–04	Halifax (N)	16–18	Launceston (S)	Ovenden Park, Halifax, West Yorkshire	
2004-05	Redruth (S)	33–14	Macclesfield (N)	The Recreation Ground, Redruth, Cornwall	4,000
2005–06	North Walsham (S)	5–15	Nuneaton (N)	Norwich Road, Scottow, Norfolk	1,302
2006–07	Westcombe Park (S)	36–20	Tynedale (N)	Goddington Dene, Orpington, Greater London	1,700
2007–08	Cinderford (S)	15–14	Darlington Mowden Park (N)	Dockham Road, Cinderford, Gloucestershire	2,800
2008–09	No promotion play-offs this season due to the restructuring of the English rugby union league system, with only the champions of each division promoted.				
2009–10	Loughborough Students (N)	21–43	Rosslyn Park (S)	Loughborough University Stadium, Loughborough, Leicestershire	1,000
2010–11	Jersey (S)	30–5	Loughborough Students (N)	St. Peter, Saint Peter, Jersey	3,100
2011–12	Richmond (S)	20–13 (aet)	Caldy (N)	Athletic Ground, Richmond, Greater London	1,600
2012–13	Stourbridge (N)	26–28	Worthing Raiders (S)	Stourton Park, Stourbridge, West Midlands	925
2013–14	Darlington Mowden Park (N)	30–28 (aet)	Ampthill (S)	The Northern Echo Arena, Darlington, County Durham	975
2014–15	Ampthill (N)	19–10	Bishop's Stortford (S)	Dillingham Park, Ampthill, Bedfordshire	1,253
2015–16	Old Albanian (S)	24–0	Sedgley Park (N)	Woollam Playing Fields, St Albans, Hertfordshire	473
2016–17	Sale FC (N)	14–19	Old Elthamians (S)	Heywood Road, Sale, Greater Manchester	1,297
2017–18	Chinnor (S)	40–31	Sedgley Park (N)	Kingsey Road, Thame, Oxfordshire	1,378
2018–19	Canterbury (S)	19–10	Chester (N)	The Marine Travel Ground, Canterbury, Kent	1,114
2019–20	Cancelled due to COVID-19 pandemic in the United Kingdom. Best ranked runner-up – Tonbridge Juddians (S) promoted.				
2020–21	Cancelled due to COVID-19 pandemic in the United Kingdom.				
2021–22	Cancelled due the reorganisation of tier three and four national leagues.				
Green background represent the promoted teams. (N) stands for the northern teams and (S) stands for the southern teams.

== Number of league titles ==
- Hull Ionians (3)
- Macclesfield (3)
- Caldy (2)
- Nuneaton (2)
- Rotherham Titans (2) (Note: One of Rotherham's league titles was won during the period when tier 4 was a single national league (1993-96).)
- Aspatria (1)
- Birmingham & Solihull (1)
- Blaydon (1)
- Bradford & Bingley (1)
- Broughton Park (1)
- Doncaster (1)
- Fylde (1)
- Halifax (1)
- Harrogate (1)
- Hull (1)
- Kendal (1)
- Leeds Tykes (1)
- Loughborough Students (1)
- Otley (1)
- Preston Grasshoppers (1)
- Roundhay (1) (Note: Roundhay were a parent club to the modern day Leeds Tykes.)
- Rugby (1)
- Sale FC (1)
- Sedgley Park (1)
- Sheffield (1)
- Stourbridge (1)
- Tynedale (1)
- Waterloo (1)
- Worcester (1)

== Original teams ==
When club rugby began in 1987 this division was called Area 4 North and contained the following teams:

- Birkenhead Park (now playing in North 1 West)
- Broughton Park (now playing in North 1 West)
- Derby (now playing in Midlands 1 East)
- Durham City (now playing in North 1 East)
- Lichfield (now playing in Midlands 1 West)
- Northern (now playing in Durham/Northumberland 1)
- Preston Grasshoppers (now playing in North Premier)
- Roundhay (now Leeds Tykes and playing in National League 1)
- Rugby Lions (now playing in Midlands 1 East)
- Solihull (now Birmingham & Solihull and playing in Midlands 4 West (South))
- Stourbridge (still playing in National League 2 North)

== League format since 1987 ==
Format of fourth tier rugby union leagues in England
Year	Name	No of teams	No of matches
1987–93	Area League North; Area League South	11	10
1993–96	National Division Four	10	18
1996–97	National Four North; National Four South	14	26
1997–00	National Division 2 North; National Division 2 South	14	26
2000–09	National Division Three North; National Division Three South	14	26
2009–22	National League 2 North; National League 2 South	16	30
2022–	National Two East; National Two North; National Two West	14	26

== Records ==
Note that all records are from 1996–97 season onwards as this is widely held as the dawn of professionalism across the English club game. It also offers a better comparison between seasons as the division team numbers are roughly equal (for example when league rugby union first started in 1987–88 the northern league had only 11 teams playing 10 games each, compared to 14 teams in 1996–97 playing 26 games (home & away), going up to 16 teams in 2009–10 playing 30 games each). Attendance records are from 2000 onwards unless otherwise specified. All records are up to date up till the end of the 2019–20 season.

=== League records ===
- Most titles: 3

Hull Ionians (2012–13, 2014–15, 2018–19)
Macclesfield (2009–10, 2013–14, 2015–16)

- Most times promoted from division: 3

Hull Ionians (2012–13, 2014–15, 2018–19)
Nuneaton (2002–03, 2005–06, 2008–09)
Macclesfield (2009–10, 2013–14, 2015–16)

- Most times relegated from division: 4

Scunthorpe (2002–03, 2016–17, 2019–20, 2025–26)

- Most league points in a season: 134

Hull Ionians (2014–15)

- Fewest league points in a season: 0

Manchester (2010–11)

- Most points scored in a season: 1,259

Fylde (2010–11)

- Fewest points scored in a season: 205

Manchester (2010–11)

- Most points conceded in a season: 1,985

Manchester (2010–11)

- Fewest points conceded in a season: 305

Kendal (1999–00)

- Best points difference (for/against): 736

Fylde (2010–11)

- Worst points difference (for/against): -1,780

Manchester (2010–11)

- Most games won in a season: 28

Hull Ionians (2012–13)

- Most games lost in a season: 30

Manchester (2010–11)
Dudley Kingswinford (2013-14)

- Most games drawn in a season: 4

Huddersfield (2019–20)

- Most bonus points in a season: 30

Sedgley Park (2017–18)

=== Match records ===
- Largest home win: 124 – 0

Blaydon at home to Orrell on 24 March 2007 (2006–07)

- Largest away win: 106 – 0

Fylde away to Orrell on 31 March 2007 (2006–07)

- Most points scored in a match: 124

Blaydon at home to Orrell on 24 March 2007 (2006–07)

- Most tries scored in a match: 18

Blaydon at home to Orrell on 24 March 2007 (2006–07)
Fylde at home to Manchester on 16 April 2011 (2010–11)

- Most conversions scored in a match: 17

Blaydon at home to Orrell on 24 March 2007 (2006–07)

- Most penalties scored in a match: 9

Luctonians at home to Birmingham & Solihull on 15 November 2014 (2014–15)

- Most drop kicks scored in a match: 3

Fylde at home to Preston Grasshoppers on 7 January 2006 (2005–06)
Nuneaton at home to Macclesfield on 11 October 2008 and away to Bradford & Bingley on 29 November 2008 (both 2008–09)
Wharfedale at home to Scunthorpe on 19 November 2016 and Wharfedale at home to Luctonians on 28 January 2017 (both 2016–17)

=== Player records ===
- Most times top points scorer: 2

(England) Tom Rhodes for Bradford & Bingley (2004–05, 2005–06)
(England) Chris Johnson for Huddersfield (2010–11, 2011–12)
(England) Lewis Mininkin for Hull Ionians (2015–16, 2018–19)
(Wales) Gavin Roberts for Caldy (2008–09, 2019–20)

- Most times top try scorer: 3

(England) Nick Royle for Fylde (2006–07) and Caldy (2015–16, 2016–17)

- Most points in a season: 422

(England) Ross Winney for Macclesfield (2009–10)

- Most tries in a season: 32

(England) Gareth Collins for Leicester Lions (2010–11)
(England) Ryan Parkinson for Macclesfield (2013–14)
(England) Nick Royle for Caldy (2016–17)

- Most points in a match: 49

(England) Ross Winney for Macclesfield away to Waterloo on 30 January 2010 (2009–10)
(England) Lewis Minikin for Hull Ionians at home to Huddersfield on 27 April 2024 (2023–24)

- Most conversions in a match: 17

(Wales) Anthony Mellalieu for Blaydon at home to Orrell on 24 March 2007 (2006–07)

- Most tries in a match: 7

(England) Matt Donkin for Doncaster at home to Whitchurch on 10 November 2001 (2001–02)
(England) Nick Royle for Fylde away to Orrell on 31 March 2007 (2006–07)
(England) Dominic Moon for Preston Grasshoppers at home to Otley on 14 April 2012 (2011–12)

- Most penalties in a match: 9

(England) Louis Silver for Luctonians at home to Birmingham & Solihull on 15 November 2015 (2014–15)

- Most drop kicks in a match: 3

(England) Mike Scott for Fylde at home to Preston Grasshoppers on 7 January 2006 (2005–06)
(England) Rickie Aley for Nuneaton at home to Macclesfield on 11 October 2008 and away to Bradford & Bingley on 29 November 2008 (both 2008–09)
(England) Tom Barrett for Wharfedale at home to Scunthorpe on 19 November 2016 and at home to Luctonians on 28 January 2017 (both 2016–17)

=== Attendance records ===
- Highest attendance (league game): 3,750

Darlington Mowden Park at home to Macclesfield on 26 April 2014 (2013–14)

- Lowest attendance (league game): 37

South Leicester at home to Sedgley Park on 30 March 2019 (2018–19)

- Highest attendance (promotion play-off): 1,500

Sedgley Park at home to Launceston (2000–01) (Note: Note that promotion play-off games include stats for northern clubs only. Southern club attendances will be covered on the National League 2 South page.)

- Lowest attendance (promotion play-off): 925 (Note: Note that due to poor attendance keeping by press and online sources means that only seasons from 2004–-05 onwards are included (apart from play-off games).)

Stourbridge at home to Worthing Raiders on 11 May 2013 (2012–13) (Note: This attendance is the lowest recorded but may not actually be the lowest as a couple of play-off games involving northern clubs have no attendance figures due to poor coverage. It is also worth noting than many Stourbridge fans felt the crowd was twice this large but this is the figure given in The Rugby Paper.)

- Highest average attendance (club): 921

Fylde (2010–11)

- Lowest average attendance (club): 85

South Leicester (2018–19)

- Highest average attendance (season): 348 (2019–20)
- Lowest average attendance (season): 239 (2007–08)

=== National League 2 North top 10 point scorers, all time ===
As of the end of the games of 27 April 2019. Stats taken from 1998–99 season onwards and include regular league games only in National League 2 North (no promotion play-off games). Points scored includes tries, drop kicks, penalties and conversions.

Rank	Nat	Name	Years	Club(s)	Points	Apps	Ratio
1	(England)	Jon Boden	2006–18	Leicester Lions	2,059	277	7.4
2	(England)	Chris Johnson	2008–12, 2018–19; 2016–18	Huddersfield; Sale	1,927	187	10.3
3	(England)	**Mark Ireland**	2009–12; 2013–14; 2017–	Kendal; Otley; Sheffield Tigers	1,479	159	9.3
4	(England)	**Stephen Collins**	2010–11; 2013–	Fylde; Sedgley Park	1,470	159	9.2
5	(England)	Richard Vasey	2009–17	Caldy	1,449	158	9.2
6	(England)	Ross Winney	2005–10	Macclesfield	1,290	126	10
7	(Wales)	**Gavin Roberts**	2007–17, 2019–	Caldy	1,284	232	5.5
8	(England)	**Rickie Aley**	2008–09; 2015–18; 2018–	Nuneaton; South Leicester; Stourbridge	1,126	110	10.2
9	(England)	Phillip Belgian	2001–08	Tynedale	1,070	116	9
10	(England)	Mark Bedworth	2001–05; 2010–12	Darlington Mowden Park; Westoe	1,052	120	9

(Bold denotes players still playing in National League 2 North.)

=== National League 2 North top 10 try scorers, all time ===
As of the end of the games of 27 April 2019. Stats taken from 1998–99 season onwards and include regular league games only in National League 2 North (no promotion play-off games).

Rank	Nat	Name	Years	Club(s)	Tries	Apps	Ratio
1	(England)	**Nick Royle**	2003–04; 2005–11; 2014–17, 2019–	Liverpool St Helens; Fylde; Caldy	193	212	0.9
2	(England)	**Jamie Broadley**	2009–11; 2011–12, 2016– 2014-15	Harrogate; Sheffield Tigers; Hull	157	190	0.8
3	(England)	Gareth Collins	2004–05; 2005–14	Rugby Lions; Leicester Lions	152	229	0.7
4	(England)	**Andrew Riley**	2013–	Sedgley Park	122	171	0.7
5	(Wales)	Gavin Roberts	2007–17	Caldy	114	232	0.5
6	(England)	Oliver Brennand	2004–11	Fylde	96	102	0.9
7	(England)	Devon Constant	2014–19	Leicester Lions	88	135	0.7
8	(England)	Andrew Soutar	2006–-08; 2008–17	West Park St Helens; Caldy	83	281	0.3
9	(England)	**Peter Swatkins**	2011–	Sheffield Tigers	82	148	0.6
9	(England)	**Craig Ross**	2007–08, 2009–11, 2013–14; 2014–	Caldy; Chester	82	165	0.5
9	(England)	**Nicholas Sharpe**	2006–07; 2008–13, 2014–16, 2017–	Rugby Lions; Huddersfield	82	261	0.3

(Bold denotes players still playing in National League 2 North.)

== See also ==
- English rugby union system
- History of the English rugby union system
- National League 2 South
- National League 2 East
- National League 2 West
