= Nick Royle =

English rugby league & union player

- Born: 25 September 1983 (age 43) Widnes, Cheshire
- Height: 1.83 m (6 ft 0 in)
- Weight: 83 kg (13 st 1 lb)

Rugby union career
- Position: Wing
Senior career
Years	Team	Apps	(Points)
2002-03	Manchester	19	(30)
2003-04	Liverpool SH	8	(20)
2005-12	Fylde	123	(635)
2005-12	Sale Sharks	2	(0)
2012-14	Vale of Lune	50	(280)
2014-	Caldy	140	(570)
- Correct as of 12 May 2018
International career
Years	Team	Apps	(Points)
2007, 2009	England Counties XV	6	(25)
2009-12	England Sevens	11	(145)
- Correct as of 12 May 2018
- Rugby league career

Playing information
- Position: Wing
Club
Years	Team	Pld	T	G	FG	P
2003–04	Widnes Vikings	13	7	0	0	28
2005	Rochdale Hornets	3	2	0	0	8
2009	Blackpool Panthers	7	6	0	0	24
	Total	23	15	0	0	60

Nick Royle (born 1983) is a former England Rugby Sevens International rugby union and rugby league player. He plays as a winger. He is currently playing 15-aside rugby for Caldy in the RFU Championship. As of 2018 he is the most prolific try scorer in National league history with over 190 tries. Royle has also had success with Lancashire in the Bill Beaumont Cup - winning the competition 3 times. As well as playing international sevens, he was selected by the England Counties XV.

== Career ==
In 2002 Royle was playing rugby union for Manchester, then in the second tier of English rugby. He made a number of league and cup appearances for the club, mostly as a substitute, and scored several tries. The next season, he dropped several divisions to National League 2 North (then known as National 3 North) to spend a year playing for Liverpool St Helens, who unfortunately ended up being relegated from the league. During the summer of 2004 he switched to rugby league, playing for Super League side Widnes Vikings, plus Rochdale Hornets and Blackpool Panthers in the lower divisions.

Despite making a number of appearances in the Super League, Royle returned to rugby union for the 2005-06 season and was signed by Premiership side Sale Sharks, who loaned him out to local Lancashire side, Fylde, who were playing in the fourth division. He scored 16 tries for a Fylde side that finished mid table. The following year, Royle's performances continued to improve with Fylde as he finished as the league's top try scorer with 31 tries and his club side finished in 5th place. He also equaled the division's record of seven tries in one game during the 106-0 thrashing of relegated Orrell on 31 March 2007. The 2007-08 season with Fylde was less prolific for Royle, although he still managed 20 tries in league and cup competitions and Fylde just missed out on a playoff spot when they finished 3rd. In September 2007 Royle's form saw him picked by the England Counties XV for the FIRA/AER Rugby Festival held in south-west France. He played in all 3 games at the festival scoring 3 tries.

The next couple of seasons would see Royle continue his prolific try scoring with Fylde, during which he was called up for the England Sevens team in 2009, England Counties and the Barbarians.

Royle was also involved with the Lancashire country side that won the Bill Beaumont Cup in the summer of 2009 - scoring a try in the 32 - 18 win against Gloucestershire at the final at Twickenham. A second county championship win with Lancashire would be repeated in the 2010 Bill Beaumont Cup, as Royle played in the 37-27 victory over Cheshire. He would also be picked by England Counties XV for their 2009 tour of South Korea and Japan - playing all 3 games and scoring 2 tries.

The 2011-12 season would see Royle be called up once more by the England Sevens team, finishing best try scorer of the Sevens Grand Prix Series with 35 tries.

In 2012 Royle decided to leave Fylde on what was initially thought to be a temporary (but financially lucrative) deal to play for the Vale of Lune, a local side which played three divisions below Fylde. While at the Vale of Lune, Royle broke the club's season try scoring record of 36 set by former player Mark Nelson (got who was also Royle's coach at Fylde) with 38 league tries during the 2013-14 season. While at Vale of Lune, Royle was also called up to the Lancashire county rugby side, with whom he helped win the 2013 Bill Beaumont Cup (his third successive cup victory for his county), scoring 2 tries as Lancashire defeated Cornwall at the final held at Twickenham, and finishing the tournaments top try scorer with 5.

Royle returned to national rugby with Caldy for the 2014-15 season, playing in National League 2 North (tier 4). Royle finished the 2015-16 season as the division's top try scorer with 25 tries, also becoming the divisions all-time top try scorer. The 2016-17 season was an extremely successful one for Royle and his club, as he contributed 32 tries to finish once again as the top try scorer in the division for a record breaking 3rd time, and Caldy were promoted to National League 1 as champions - the highest level the club has reached. The next season he scored 19 tries in National League 1 as Caldy finished their first season in the new division in a respectable 11th place. Although he had a good second season individually, his tries (20 in all) were not enough to keep Caldy up and they were relegated at the end of 2018-19.

== Season-by-season playing stats ==
=== Club ===
Season	Club	Competition	Appearances	Tries	Drop Goals	Conversions	Penalties	Total Points
2002-03	Manchester	National Division One	17	4	0	0	0	20
2002-03	Manchester	Powergen Cup	2	2	0	0	0	10
2003-04	Liverpool St Helens	National Division 3 North	8	4	0	0	0	20
2004	Widnes Vikings	Super League	13	7	0	0	0	28
2005	Rochdale Hornets	RFL National League	3	2	0	0	0	8
2005-06	Fylde	National Division 3 North	18	16	0	0	0	80
2005-06	Fylde	EDF Energy Trophy	1	0	0	0	0	0
2006-07	Fylde	National Division 3 North	22	31	0	0	0	155
2006-07	Fylde	EDF Energy Trophy	1	0	0	0	0	0
2007-08	Fylde	National Division 3 North	23	14	0	0	0	70
2007-08	Fylde	EDF Energy Trophy	2	6	0	0	0	30
2008-09	Fylde	National Division 3 North	17	24	0	0	0	120
2008-09	Sale Sharks	EDF Cup	2	0	0	0	0	0
2009-10	Fylde	National League 2 North	16	11	0	0	0	55
2010-11	Fylde	National League 2 North	18	24	0	0	0	120
2011-12	Fylde	National League 1	4	1	0	0	0	5
2012-13	Fylde	National League 1	1	0	0	0	0	0
2012-13 (Note: For the 2012-13 season Royle's appearance and try statistics may also include cup games (Staffordshire Trophy) as well as league.)	Vale of Lune	North Division 1 West	21	18	0	0	0	90
2013-14	Vale of Lune	North Division 1 West	29	38	0	0	0	190
2014-15	Caldy	National League 2 North	30	12	0	0	0	90
2015-16	Caldy	National League 2 North	30	25	0	0	0	125
2016-17	Caldy	National League 2 North	30	32	0	0	0	160
2017-18	Caldy	National League 1	29	19	0	0	0	95
2018-19	Caldy	National League 1	29	20	0	0	0	100
2019-20	Caldy	National League 2 North						

=== County or representative ===
Season	Side	Competition	Appearances	Tries	Drop Goals	Conversions	Penalties	Total Points
2006-07	Lancashire	Bill Beaumont Cup	1 (Note: Played at least 1 game (final) in 2007 Bill Beaumont Cup. Likely to have played in the other 3 games but this is not certain as little information online.)	?	0	0	0	?
2007-08	England Counties XV	FIRA/AER Rugby Festival, France	3	3	0	0	0	15
2007-08	Lancashire	Bill Beaumont Cup	1 (Note: Played at least 1 game in 2008 Bill Beaumont Cup scoring a try. Likely to have played in the other 2 group games but this is not clear due to poor press coverage of competition that year.)	1	0	0	0	5
2008-09	Barbarians	Test	1	2	0	0	0	10
2008-09	Lancashire	Bill Beaumont Cup	4	7	0	0	0	35
2008-09	England Counties XV	Tour of Korea and Japan	3	2	0	0	0	10
2009-10	Lancashire	Bill Beaumont Cup	2 (Note: Played at least 2 games during 2010 Bill Beaumont Cup. May have played the 2 other games but not clear from press sources. What is clear is that he did not get any tries during the tournament.)	0	0	0	0	0
2011-12	Lancashire	Bill Beaumont Cup	1	0	0	0	0	0
2012-13	Lancashire	Bill Beaumont Cup	4	5	0	0	0	25
2014-15	Cheshire	Bill Beaumont Cup	3	1	0	0	0	5

== Honours and records ==
National League 2 North

- Tier 4 (North) all-time top try scorer (161 tries)
- Tier 4 (North) most tries in a match: 7 (tied)

Fylde

- National Division 3 North top try scorer: 2006-07 (31 tries)
- National League 2 North champions: 2010-11

Vale of Lune

- North Division 1 West top try scorer: 2013-14 (38 tries)
- Most league tries in a season (38 tries)

Caldy

- National League 2 North top try scorer: 2015-16 (25 tries)
- National League 2 North champions (2): 2016-17, 2019-20
- National League 2 North top try scorer: 2016-17 (32 tries)

Lancashire

- Bill Beaumount Cup winner (3): 2009, 2010, 2013
- Bill Beaumount Cup runner up: 2012
- Bill Beaumount Cup top try scorer: 2013 (5 tries)

International/Representative

- Selected for England Counties XV: 2009
- Selected for Barbarians: 2009
- Selected for England Sevens: 2009, 2011
