= Lancashire Cup (rugby union) =

Rugby union cup competition in England

- Current season, competition or edition: 2026-27
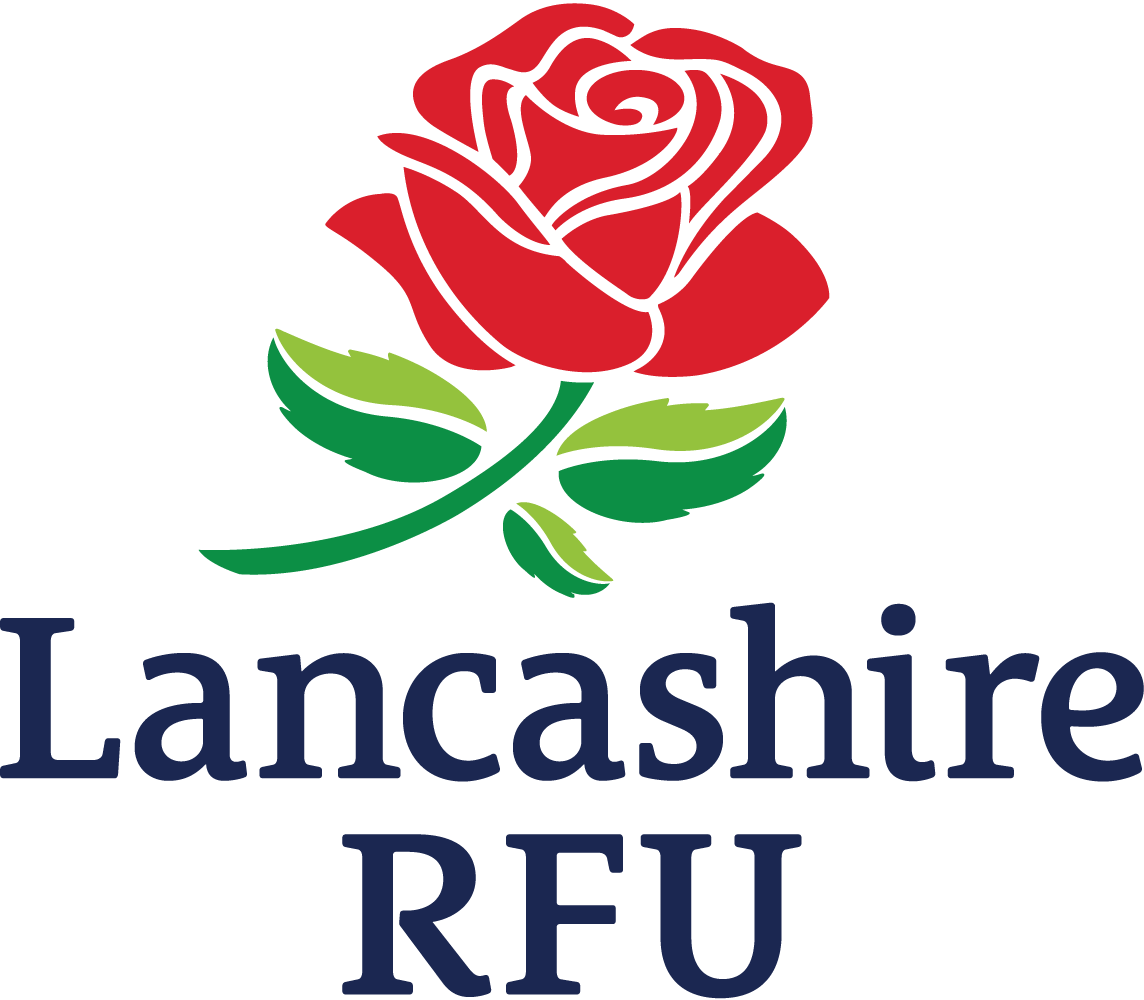
- Sport: Rugby union
- Founded: 1893
- Replaced by: 1971
- Countries: England
- Most recent champion: Vale of Lune (3rd title)
- Most titles: Orrell (10 titles)
- Website: https://www.lancashirerfu.com

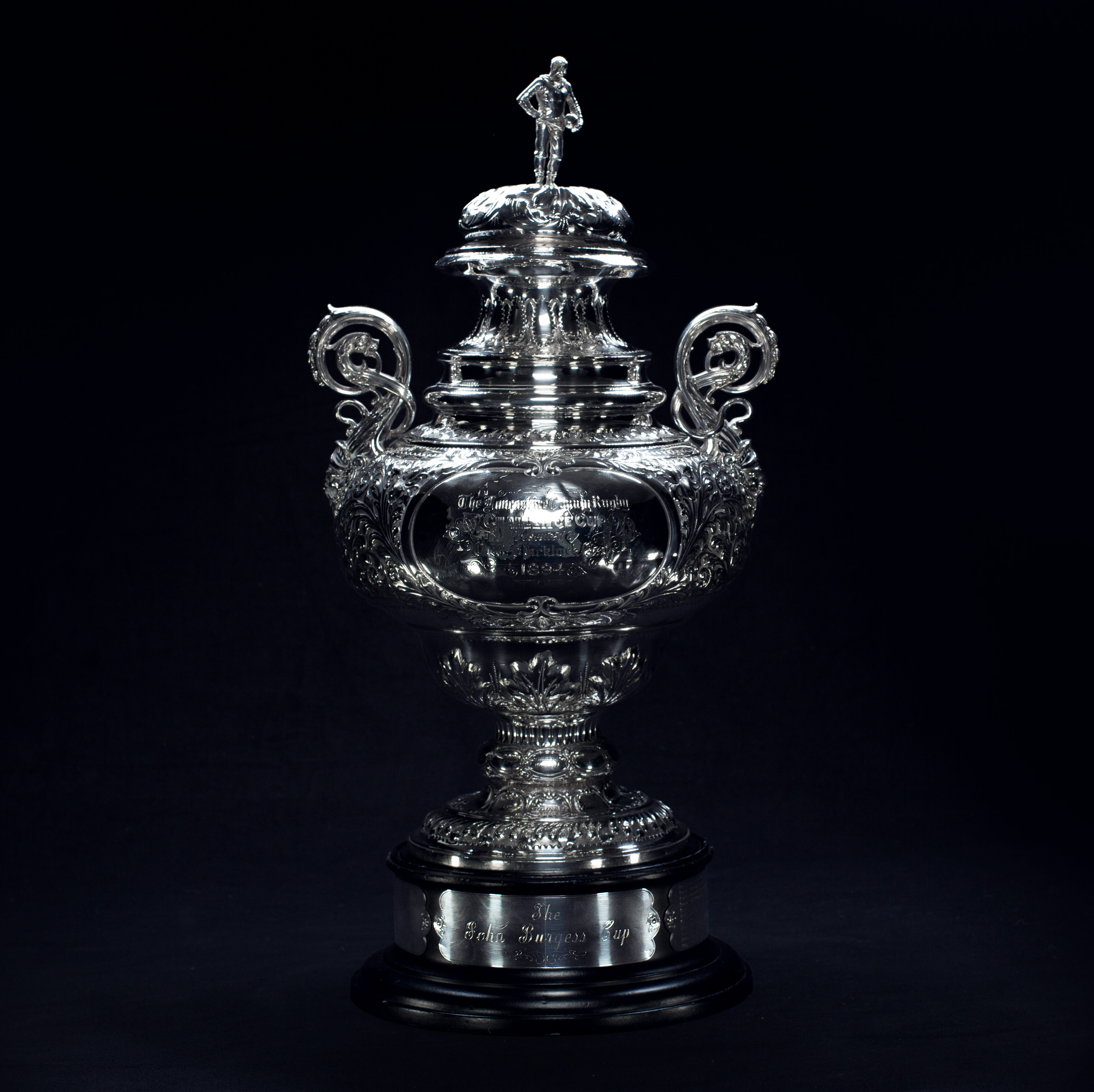
John Burgess Lancashire Cup

The John Burgess Lancashire Cup is an English Rugby Football Union competition organised by the Lancashire Rugby Football Union and open to all eligible clubs in the Lancashire region including a number of clubs in Cheshire and Merseyside. The men's competition was discontinued at the end of 2013 as there were not enough teams willing to participate (partly due to the increased demands of league rugby) and subsequently reintroduced in 2021.

== History ==
Despite the Lancashire RFU being established in 1881 and having the most successful county team in the country, club rugby union took a long time to catch on in Lancashire. While bitter rivals Yorkshire had an established county club competition (the Yorkshire Cup) from 1878, Lancashire did not have a similar sustained competition until 1971. This lack of competitive rugby perhaps contributing to Lancashire's smaller membership of clubs when compared to its counterpart.

The Lancashire County Rugby Challenge Cup was first introduced in 1893-1894 season. As a consequence of the loss of clubs to Northern Union from 1895 onwards, the competition was withdrawn in 1897 and reintroduced in 1971. In 1997, the competition was renamed the John Burgess Lancashire Cup in honour of the former Lancashire and England Coach and RFU President.

Some of the current clubs competing appear to be based outside of Lancashire, such as Liverpool St Helens and Waterloo, but when the Lancashire RFU was founded, places like Merseyside and Liverpool were part of the county, and these teams have retained their membership.

== Final results ==
Year	Winner	Score	Runner up	Venue
1971-72	Orrell	16 – 0	Liverpool	St. Anthony's Road, Blundellsands
1972-73	Orrell	32 – 7	West Park St Helens	
1973-74	Waterloo	12 – 9	Broughton Park	
1974-75	Orrell	9 – 3	Manchester	
1975-76	Widnes	21 – 9	West Park St Helens	
1976-77	Liverpool	10 – 9	Orrell	
1977-78	Orrell	12 - 3	Liverpool	
1978-79	Liverpool	10 - 6	Orrell	
1979-80	Waterloo	12 – 0	Broughton Park	
1980-81	Orrell	12 – 6	Liverpool	
1981-82	Orrell	17 – 12	Liverpool	
1982-83	Orrell	26 – 3	Liverpool	
1983-84	Liverpool	20 – 3	Preston Grasshoppers	St. Anthony's Road, Blundellsands
1984-85	Waterloo	11 - 6	Vale of Lune	Woodlands Memorial Ground, Fylde
1985-86	Vale of Lune	19 – 10	Preston Grasshoppers	Woodlands Memorial Ground, Fylde
1986-87	Waterloo	25 – 12	Orrell	
1987-88	Orrell	23 - 6	Liverpool St Helens	
1988-89	Orrell	48 - 6	Broughton Park	Moss Lane, St. Helens
1989-90	Liverpool St Helens	24 - 9	Waterloo	
1990-91	Widnes	23 – 7	Orrell	
1991-92	Vale of Lune	12 – 6	Widnes	
1992-93	Waterloo	13 - 11	Liverpool St Helens	
1993-94	Waterloo	19 - 6	Orrell	
1994-95	Fylde	15 - 11	Manchester	
1995-96	Liverpool St Helens	22 – 13	Widnes	
1996-97	Orrell	27 – 17	Preston Grasshoppers	
1997-98	Manchester	42 – 19	Fylde	
1998-99	Manchester	29 - 27	Orrell	
1999-00	West Park St Helens	33 – 23	Manchester	
2000-01	Manchester	27 - 20	Sedgley Park	Lightfoot Green, Preston
2001-02	Sedgley Park	31 – 3	Fylde	Lightfoot Green, Preston
2002-03	Preston Grasshoppers	34 – 31	West Park St Helens	Park Lane, Whitefield
2003-04	Sedgley Park	51 – 25	Vale of Lune	Park Lane, Whitefield
2004-05	West Park St Helens	22 – 13	Preston Grasshoppers	Park Lane, Whitefield
2005-06	Preston Grasshoppers	43 - 14	Waterloo	Park Lane, Whitefield
2006-07	Sedgley Park	24 – 14	Manchester	Woodlands Memorial Ground, Fylde
2007-08	Waterloo	30 – 19	Sedgley Park	Park Lane, Whitefield
2008-09	Fylde	37 – 17	Preston Grasshoppers	Lightfoot Green, Preston
2009-10	Fylde	15 – 7	Preston Grasshoppers	Lightfoot Green, Preston
2010-11	Fylde	W/O	Rossendale	N/A
2011-12	Preston Grasshoppers	30 - 10	Sedgley Park	Woodlands Memorial Ground, Fylde
2012-13	Sedgley Park	28 - 24	Preston Grasshoppers	Park Lane, Whitefield
2013-18	(no competition)			
2018-19	Blackburn	22 - 20	Rochdale	Moorgate Avenue, Rochdale
2019-20	(not completed)			
2020-21	(no competition)			
2021-22	Preston Grasshoppers	59 - 8	Widnes	Douglas Valley, Wigan
2022-23	Blackburn	87 - 3	Firwood Waterloo	Hand Lane, Leigh
2023-24	(no competition)			
2024-25	Firwood Waterloo	33 - 14	West Park St Helens	Douglas Valley, Wigan
2025-26	Vale of Lune	19 - 15	Widnes	Douglas Valley, Wigan
2026-27				

== Number of wins ==
- Orrell (10)
- Waterloo (8)
- Liverpool/Liverpool St Helens (5)
- Fylde (4)
- Preston Grasshoppers (4)
- Sedgley Park (4)
- Manchester (3)
- Vale of Lune (3)
- West Park St Helens (2)
- Widnes (2)
- Blackburn (2)

== See also ==
- Lancashire RFU
- English rugby union system
- Rugby union in England
