= Steve Bainbridge =

English rugby union player

- Born: Stephen Bainbridge; 7 October 1956 (age 70) Newcastle upon Tyne, England
- Height: 6 ft 7 in (2.01 m)
- Weight: 106 kg (234 lb)

Rugby union career
- Position: Lock
Amateur team(s)
Years	Team	Apps	(Points)
- Fylde
–	Gosforth		
–	Orrell		
–	Blaydon		
International career
Years	Team	Apps	(Points)
1982–1987	England	18	(0)

Stephen Bainbridge (born 7 October 1956) is a former England international rugby union player. In 1983 he toured with the British and Irish Lions on their tour to New Zealand and in the 1987 Rugby World Cup. He played amongst other teams for club rugby for Fylde, Gosforth, Blaydon and Orrell R.U.F.C.
