= Preston Grasshoppers R.F.C. =

English rugby union club, based in Lancashire

(England) Preston Grasshoppers
- Full name: Preston Grasshoppers Rugby Football Club
- Union: Lancashire RFU
- Nickname: Hoppers
- Founded: 1869; 157 years ago
- Location: Preston, Lancashire, England
- Ground: Lightfoot Green (Capacity: 2,250 (250 seats))
- Chairman: John Chesworth
- President: Bob Thompson
- Coach: Dan Orwin Karl Ince Danny Maher
- Captain: Josh Longson
- League: National League 2 North
- 2025–26: 9th
Team kit

Official website
- pgrfc.co.uk

Preston Grasshoppers Rugby Football Club is an English rugby union team from Preston, Lancashire. The men's senior team play in the RFU National League 2 North, a level 4 league in the RFU league pyramid.

== History ==
The club was founded on 28 September 1869 at a meeting held at the Bull Hotel, Preston, making it one of the oldest 'northern' rugby union teams.

The club were based at Farringdon Park (modern day Farringdon Crescent), New Hall Lane from 1924 until 1932, on the site of an old amusement park and cycling track. In 1929 the club agreed a six-year sub-tenancy with Preston speedway team, and a dirt track was constructed around the perimeter of the rugby pitch. The speedway syndicate folded in 1932 but a greyhound syndicate paid the Grasshoppers £2,000 (a huge sum at the time) to vacate the ground the same year.

While many notable players have played for the team before going onto play professionally (both in the Premiership and for England), Preston's most famous player is lock Wade Dooley. Nicknamed 'the Blackpool Tower', Dooley played for Grasshoppers in the 1980s and 90s (before rugby turned professional) and whilst working in the Lancashire Constabulary. Dooley gained 58 Test caps- 55 for England and 3 for the British & Irish Lions. The main room at Grasshopper's modern ground, Lightfoot Green Lane, is named the Dooley Suite after him.

When the national league structure was introduced in the mid nineties, Hoppers remained in National League 3 (North) until their promotion in the 1998–99 season. This was achieved with the help of Australian Michael Lough and winger Ian Bruce who, between them, scored over 50 tries.

In 2013, Preston Grasshoppers 2nd team won the Preston Sports Awards Team Performance of the Year. At the end of the 2015–16 Season Preston Grasshoppers accepted an offer from the RFU to replace the grass surface at Lightfoot Green Lane with an artificial 3G pitch. The terms of the agreement mean that the RFU have exclusive use of the pitch for the next thirty years.

In 2017–18 the club made an immediate return to National 2 North by winning the Northern Premier League at the first attempt. Under longstanding Director of Rugby Gareth Dyer and head coach Paul Arnold, the side were the stand-out side in the division with number 8 Matthew Lamprey scoring 32 league tries during the campaign to set a new club record for tries in a league season, beating the previous best of 27 set by Michael Lough in the 1998–99 National 2 North championship winning season.

After a mid-table finish in National 2 North in the 2018–19 season, the club suffered an injury decimated season that resulted in relegation in a shortened season due to the COVID-19 pandemic. No play was available at all in the 2020–21 season due to the pandemic but the team rebounded to National Two by finishing runners-up in the Northern Premier Division in the 2021–22 season. They also won the Lancashire Cup to crown a superb season.

Joel Unsworth succeeded Arnold as head coach for the 2022-23 season whilst Director of Rugby Gareth Dyer also departed after 15 years in the role. Alex Keay returned to the role and after a poor start to the season, Keay also assumed the Head Coach role. Grasshoppers now compete in the restructured National League 2 North.

== Ground ==
Preston Grasshoppers currently play at Lightfoot Green and have been based there since 1960. Ground capacity was listed by the club in 1990 as being 2,250, with 2,000 standing and 250 seated, which appears to be accurate by modern standards.

== Honours ==
- Jewson National League 2 North champions: 1998–99
- Lancashire Cup winners (4): 2003, 2006, 2012, 2022
- North Premier champions (2): 2004–05, 2017–18,
- North Premier runner-up: 2021–22 (promoted)

== Current standings ==
2026–27 National League 2 North table
Pos	Team	Pld	W	D	L	PF	PA	PD	TB	LB	Pts	Qualification
1	Sedgley Park	8	8	0	0	420	111	+309	8	0	40	Promotion place
2	Darlington Mowden Park	8	6	0	2	388	159	+229	7	1	32	Promotion play-off
3	Chester	8	6	0	2	315	214	+101	6	1	31	
4	Tynedale	8	6	0	2	252	221	+31	6	0	30	
5	Hull Ionians	7	5	0	2	276	220	+56	7	1	28	
6	Preston Grasshoppers	8	5	0	3	295	235	+60	6	1	27	
7	Harrogate	8	3	1	4	204	328	−124	6	0	20	
8	Sheffield Tigers	8	3	0	5	225	229	−4	5	3	20	
9	Fylde	8	3	0	5	198	253	−55	5	0	17	
10	Billingham	8	3	0	5	222	350	−128	5	0	17	
11	Huddersfield	8	2	1	5	202	362	−160	5	1	16	
12	Heath	8	2	0	6	188	282	−94	4	1	13	Relegation play-off
13	Otley	7	1	0	6	183	292	−109	4	1	9	Relegation place
14	Wharfedale	8	1	0	7	203	315	−112	5	0	9	Relegation place

Updated to match(es) played on 2 September 2026. Source: National League Rugby
Rules for classification: If teams are level at any stage, tiebreakers are applied in the following order:
1. Number of matches won
2. Number of matches drawn
3. Difference between points for and against
4. Total number of points for
5. Aggregate number of points scored in matches between tied teams
6. Number of matches won excluding the first match, then the second and so on until the tie is settled

== Notable former players ==
=== England ===
The following players have made appearances for England whilst playing for Grasshoppers:

- Wade Dooley (1985–1993, 58 appearances, 3 tries)

The following players have made appearances for England after playing for Grasshoppers:

- A. N. Hornby (1887–1882, 9 appearances, 1 try)
- Paul Grayson (1995–2004, 32 appearances, 2 tries)
- Will Greenwood (1997–2004, 55 appearances, 31 tries)
- Pat Sanderson (1998–2007, 16 appearances, 1 try)
- Iain Balshaw (2000–2008, 35 appearances, 13 tries)
- Steve Borthwick (2001–2010, 57 appearances, 2 tries)
- Alex Sanderson (2001–2003, 5 appearances, 1 try)

The following players have coached England after playing or coaching Grasshoppers:

- Dick Greenwood (1983–1985)
- Steve Borthwick (2022–present)

=== Ireland ===
The following players have made appearances for Ireland after playing for Grasshoppers:

- Mike Haley (2019, 1 appearance)

=== British & Irish Lions ===
The following players have made appearances for the British & Irish Lions whilst playing for Grasshoppers:

- Wade Dooley (1989 and 1993, 3 appearances)

The following players have made appearances for the Lions after playing for Grasshoppers:

- Will Greenwood (1997, 2001, 2005, 2 appearances)
- Iain Balshaw (2001 and 2005, 3 appearances)

=== Other notable players ===
The following people have made appearances for Grasshoppers:

- Sean Long (rugby league player)
- John Kirkpatrick (rugby league)
