= Fylde RFC =

English rugby union club

(England) Fylde
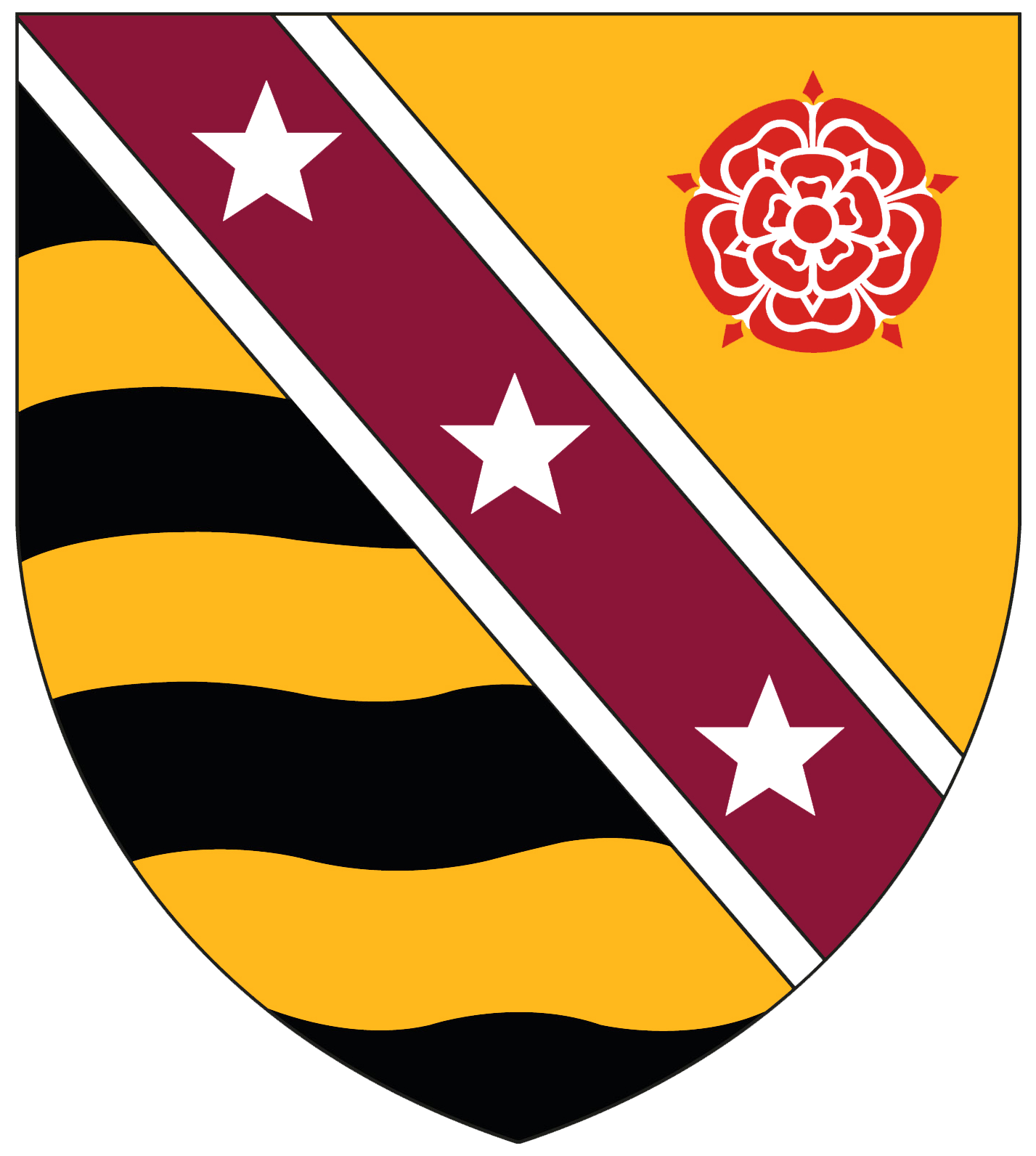
- Full name: Fylde Rugby Football Club
- Union: Lancashire RFU
- Founded: 1919 (107 years ago)
- Location: Lytham St. Annes, Lancashire, England
- Ground: Woodlands Memorial Ground (Capacity: 7,500 (500 seats))
- Chairman: (New Zealand) Matt Filipo
- President: (England) Anthony Hoskisson
- Captain: (England) Toby Harrison
- League: National League 2 North
- 2025–26: 6th
Team kit

Official website
- fylde.rugby

Fylde Rugby Union Club /ˈfaɪld/ is a rugby union club based in Lytham St Annes, on the Fylde coast in Lancashire, England. The home venue is the Woodlands Memorial Ground on Blackpool Road in Ansdell and the first team play in English rugby's National League 2 North, the fourth tier of the English rugby union system, following their relegation from National League 1 at the end of the 2017–18 season. There are another two senior teams, the Hawks and the Vandals, who play in the English North West Leagues, in the NW Premiership and NW3 North. There is also a Colts team. In previous seasons the Colts have played in the Lancashire & Cheshire regional leagues.

== History ==
=== Overview ===
Fylde Rugby Club was founded on 25 July 1919, literally on the toss of a coin when a group of Huddersfield businessmen met at Ansdell Institute to discuss the formation of either a rugby union or a football club. A coin was tossed and it fell in favour of rugby union. Hence the similarity in kit between clubs. The club grew steadily and achieved a strong fixture list by the 1960s and has been in the National Leagues since the league's inception in 1987.

It takes its name from The Fylde, a roughly 13-mile (20-kilometre) square-shaped peninsula, bounded by Morecambe Bay to the north, the Ribble estuary to the south, the Irish Sea to the west, and the Bowland hills to the east, with Blackpool to the north and Preston to the east.

=== Formative years ===
In May, 1920 the present Woodlands site was first used for rugby. The admission was 5d and the first yearly gate receipts amounted to just over £57. In 1922, Harold Brooks was elected president and through his efforts Fylde progressed. He also provided the present stand. In 1924 the club was represented in the Lancashire team by players such as "Ham" Neville, who was capped 33 times, and "Pop" Ogden. The club was strengthened by the merger with Blackpool Old Boys in the 1934–35 season.

During the World War II, Fylde, along with many other clubs, had to close as the Army took over the ground. In 1946 the President, G.W. Parkes, welcomed back members from the war and by this time the ground had been purchased and named the Woodlands Memorial Ground in recognition of those members who gave their lives during the war.

=== Post-war years ===
In the 1950s, the dressing rooms were built and Pop Ogden was elected President of Lancashire. Arthur Bell and Rothwell Bamber were given life memberships for their work with the club. Bell served for 34 years as the Honorary Secretary.

In 1964 the second England trial was held at Fylde and Sir Laurie Edwards opened the new pavilion extension and presented the club with a rugby union shield which is still on the clubhouse wall.

1969 was Fylde's jubilee year, when they were fielding six or seven teams every Saturday. The club's two most famous players were home grown, Malcolm Phillips and Bill Beaumont. Phillips, who attended Arnold School in Blackpool, won 25 England caps at centre between 1958 and 1964. He was President of the Rugby Football Union (RFU) from 2004 to 2005 and has served on the International Rugby Board (IRB) for a number of years. Beaumont was also a one club man having joined Fylde as a 17-year-old in 1969 and stayed with the club until injury forced him to retire in 1982. His father had also played for Fylde and he wrote suggesting that his son be given a trial. His first game was in the sixth team as fullback. With his size and his 6'3" height, he was very quickly made into a forward to play for the first team. He earned 34 England caps between 1975 and 1982, 21 of them as captain. This included leading the side to the Grand Slam in 1980, as well as skippering the 1980 British Lions tour to South Africa. In retirement he has remained in the public eye as a broadcaster and columnist. He is still a regular face at Fylde. He has also made major contribution to rugby administration in the United Kingdom and internationally as an IRB Member, with the RFU and he was manager of the 2005 British & Irish Lions tour to New Zealand.

In the same era, a young Roger Uttley, subsequently to skipper and then manage England, and Brian Ashton, England's Head Coach, also played for Fylde. Other more recent internationals associated with Fylde include England wingers Tony Swift and Simon Smith, who were capped in the 1980s after leaving the club and locks Steve Bainbridge and Wade Dooley, established internationals who won further caps whilst with Fylde.

England 'A' winger Mark Preston had a record of scoring 98 tries in 131 appearances. He subsequently made a similar impact in rugby league with Wigan and Halifax.

=== Present day ===
As with many former top-flight clubs outside the Guinness Premiership, attendances at home matches have fallen in recent years. In the early 1990s, 2,000 spectators would watch local derbies with Preston Grasshoppers and as many as 5,000 attended in 1982 to see Bill Beaumont's XV play Lancashire, staged when he retired through injury. But the club still stages representative games such as the England v Scotland Under 19 international in January 2004 which attracted 2,500 spectators. There were 1,500 people at the Fylde v Preston Grasshoppers league match in December 2006.

Today, the teams still go onto the field wearing the colours of claret, gold and white, which were originally the colours of the Huddersfield Old Boys following the origins of Fylde's formation by Huddersfield businessmen. The colours have not changed, although the design is now modernised.

Recent seasons have seen Fylde move between National Division One, National Division Two and more recently National Division Three North (from which the club gained promotion during the 2010–11 season). The club ran up significant debts in trying to compete in National One from 1997 to 1999 and had to sell a small portion of the Woodlands' grounds in order to re-establish financial health. With the receipts of the sale, a period of redevelopment of various facilities at Woodlands began in January 2005. The new clubhouse opened in October 2005 and can house more than 600 people.

The club finished in sixth place in National Division Three North in the 2003–04 season, fourth in 2004–05 and seventh in 2005–06. The club's then rugby management, including coaches Stuart Connell, who used to play for Fylde and Cumbria, Martin Scott, who played for Orrell, Fylde and Scotland, as well as Alistair Atkinson who played for Orrell and Sedgley Park. They planned a promotion bid back to National Division Two. Leading scorers in the 2005–06 season included skipper and fly-half Mike Scott with 300 points, and one of the top goal kickers in national rugby, winger Nick Royle with 16 tries and flanker Andy Atkinson with 11 tries. The Players' Player of the Season was Paul Newton who was appointed skipper for the 2006–07 season.

Like other clubs, Fylde has struggled in the professional era to maintain a balance between a members' club and a professional outfit able to compete for players, regionally and nationally. The club, following this era, reasserted itself as a community-oriented members' club, basically amateur, bringing together players in the area, together with nurturing local talent and a bit of overseas players. Since this period of reorganisation the club has promoted young local and regional players, along with the promotion of former mini junior players to drive the club forward providing an attacking form of rugby.

The club fields eleven mini/junior sides, a Junior Colts squad and three other senior teams, the Hawks, the Saracens and the Vandals. In more recent seasons the club has also promoted more community rugby teams to promote rugby across all ages and abilities such as walking rugby. It further has a flourishing community rugby set up to promote, encourage and develop rugby in the surrounding community especially in the more disadvantaged areas at both junior and senior level.

Apart from a new clubhouse completed in September 2005, the club has developed an all-weather pitch, upgraded facilities and non-rugby items and activities forming a core to the local and regional community.

Midway through the 2007–08 season the coaches Stuart Connell and Martin Scott were replaced with Mark Nelson the Lancashire coach who has previous experience of coaching at the club along with a successful spell as backs coach at Sale. Nelson recruited a number of high calibre players including England Counties' Steve Nutt, Craig Aikman and David Wilks. He has also rekindled the club's relationship with Sale which has allowed him to call on some of the Premiership club's young players whilst Sale have also given game time to Fylde's Nick Royle.

In June 2010, it was announced that former England manager Brian Ashton would be a coaching consultant for his former club. On the 26 July 2010, it was announced that former England international Jason Robinson would be making his comeback at the club.

In June 2012, Sam Beaumont stepped down from his role as the skipper of Fylde.

== Current standings ==
2026–27 National League 2 North table
| Pos | Team | Pld | W | D | L | PF | PA | PD | TB | LB | Pts | Qualification |
|---|---|---|---|---|---|---|---|---|---|---|---|---|
| 1 | Sedgley Park | 8 | 8 | 0 | 0 | 420 | 111 | +309 | 8 | 0 | 40 | Promotion place |
| 2 | Darlington Mowden Park | 8 | 6 | 0 | 2 | 388 | 159 | +229 | 7 | 1 | 32 | Promotion play-off |
| 3 | Chester | 8 | 6 | 0 | 2 | 315 | 214 | +101 | 6 | 1 | 31 | |
| 4 | Tynedale | 8 | 6 | 0 | 2 | 252 | 221 | +31 | 6 | 0 | 30 | |
| 5 | Hull Ionians | 7 | 5 | 0 | 2 | 276 | 220 | +56 | 7 | 1 | 28 | |
| 6 | Preston Grasshoppers | 8 | 5 | 0 | 3 | 295 | 235 | +60 | 6 | 1 | 27 | |
| 7 | Harrogate | 8 | 3 | 1 | 4 | 204 | 328 | −124 | 6 | 0 | 20 | |
| 8 | Sheffield Tigers | 8 | 3 | 0 | 5 | 225 | 229 | −4 | 5 | 3 | 20 | |
| 9 | Fylde | 8 | 3 | 0 | 5 | 198 | 253 | −55 | 5 | 0 | 17 | |
| 10 | Billingham | 8 | 3 | 0 | 5 | 222 | 350 | −128 | 5 | 0 | 17 | |
| 11 | Huddersfield | 8 | 2 | 1 | 5 | 202 | 362 | −160 | 5 | 1 | 16 | |
| 12 | Heath | 8 | 2 | 0 | 6 | 188 | 282 | −94 | 4 | 1 | 13 | Relegation play-off |
| 13 | Otley | 7 | 1 | 0 | 6 | 183 | 292 | −109 | 4 | 1 | 9 | Relegation place |
| 14 | Wharfedale | 8 | 1 | 0 | 7 | 203 | 315 | −112 | 5 | 0 | 9 | Relegation place |

Updated to match(es) played on 2 September 2026. Source: National League Rugby
Rules for classification: If teams are level at any stage, tiebreakers are applied in the following order:
1. Number of matches won
2. Number of matches drawn
3. Difference between points for and against
4. Total number of points for
5. Aggregate number of points scored in matches between tied teams
6. Number of matches won excluding the first match, then the second and so on until the tie is settled

== Honours ==
1st team:

- Glengarth Sevens Davenport Shield winners 1976
- Lancashire Cup winners (4 times): 1995, 2009, 2010, 2011
- National League 2 North champions: 2010–11

Fylde Saracens (2nd team):

- North Lancs 2 champions: 2000–01

Fylde Vandals (4th team):

- NOWIRUL Plate winners 2017

== Notable former players ==
=== British & Irish Lions ===
The following Fylde players have been selected for the Lions tours while at the club:

Bill Beaumont (1977 & 1980), tour captain in 1980

=== Rugby World Cup ===
The following are players which have represented their countries at the Rugby World Cup whilst playing for Fylde:

| Tournament | Players selected | England players | Other national team players |
|---|---|---|---|
| 1987 | 2 | Steve Bainbridge, Wade Dooley | |

=== Other notable former players ===
- England – Peter Altham – England Deaf.
- England – Brian Ashton – managed England to 2007 Rugby World Cup final.
- England – Steve Bainbridge, 1983 British Lions tour to New Zealand and 1987 Rugby World Cup.
- England – Jason Robinson – won 51 England caps, 2001 and 2005 British Lions, won 13 Great Britain caps (RL)
- Great Britain (RL), and England (RL) – William "Bill" Burgess
- England – Chris Jones
- Ireland – Dylan O'Grady
- Scotland – Eric Peters
- England – Malcolm Phillips – won 25 England caps at centre between 1958 and 1964. He was President of the RFU in 2004/5
- Namibia – Ryan De La Harpe – won 9 caps for Namibia and played in the 2011 Rugby World Cup in New Zealand. The first Namibian to play for the Barbarian F.C. in 2014.
- England – Mark Preston, England 'A' winger who subsequently played for Wigan (RL)
- England – Nick Royle – played 11 times for England Sevens
- England – Simon Smith
- Great Britain (RL) – David Stephenson
- England – Tony Swift
- England – Roger Uttley – captained and managed England
- United States (RL) – Taylor Welch – represented the United States at the 2013 Rugby League World Cup
