= 2008–09 National Division Three North =

Rugby union competition in England

- Countries: England
- Champions: Nuneaton
- Runners-up: Caldy
- Relegated: Bradford & Bingley, Darlington Mowden Park
- Attendance: 43,985 (average 262 per match) (Note: Note that 14 home attendances are missing (see below) - so the total attendance will not be 100% accurate. The average attendance has also been taken into account with the missing games not included.)
- Highest attendance: 1,644; Fylde v Hull Ionians; 21 March 2009
- Lowest attendance: 65; Loughborough Students v Huddersfield; 29 November 2008
- Top point scorer: (Wales) Gavin Roberts (Caldy); 290 points
- Top try scorer: (England) Gareth Collins (Leicester Lions); 29 tries

The 2008–09 National Division Three North was the tenth and last season (twenty-second overall) of the fourth division (north) of the English domestic rugby union competition using the name National Division Three North. The division was set to be re-branded National League 2 North for the following season due to an RFU reshuffle of the entire league system. New teams to the division included Halifax and Nuneaton who were relegated from the 2007–08 National Division Two while promoted sides included Loughborough Students who came up as champions of Midlands Division 1 along with Kendal (champions) Huddersfield (playoffs) coming up from North Division 1. A further, final change to the division saw Rugby Lions transfer across to 2008–09 National Division Three South as the most southerly side in the division in order to address a team imbalance between the two leagues. The league system was 4 points for a win, 2 points for a draw and additional bonus points being awarded for scoring 4 or more tries and/or losing within 7 points of the victorious team. In terms of promotion the league champions would go straight up into what would be known as National League 1 from 2009-10 but unlike previous years, there would be no promotion playoff between the runners up of the division and the runners up of National Division Three South due to the league restructuring.

Nuneaton made it an instant return to the (newly named) 2009–10 National League 1 winning the league title and promotion ahead of nearest rivals Caldy who finished 9 points behind without the consolation of the usual north-south playoff. At the opposite end of the table Halifax suffered their second consecutive relegation being comfortably the worst team in the league with just 1 win and 1 draw for their efforts. Much more competitive but ultimately 8 points worse off than next highest team were Darlington Mowden Park who were relegated despite finishing runners up the previous season (narrowly losing in the playoffs). Darlington Mowden Park would drop down to the newly named National League 3 North (previously North Division 1). The second relegated team, Halifax, were initial supposed to join Darlington Mowden Park in that division but due to financial difficulties the club decided to drop out of the national leagues and start as an amateur club in Yorkshire 6 - the lowest level the club could drop to.

== Participating teams and locations ==
Locations of the 2008-09 National Division Three North teams

Team	Stadium	Capacity	City/Area
Bradford & Bingley	Wagon Lane	4,000	Bingley, West Yorkshire
Caldy	Paton Field	4,000	Thurstaston, Wirral, Merseyside
Darlington Mowden Park	Yiewsley Drive		Darlington, County Durham
Fylde	Woodlands Memorial Ground	7,500 (500 seats)	Lytham St. Annes, Lancashire
Halifax	Ovenden Park		Halifax, West Yorkshire
Harrogate	Claro Road	4,500 (500 seats)	Harrogate, North Yorkshire
Huddersfield	Lockwood Park	1,500 (500 seats)	Huddersfield, West Yorkshire
Hull Ionians	Brantingham Park	1,500 (240 seats)	Brantingham, East Riding of Yorkshire
Kendal	Mint Bridge	4,600 (600 seats)	Kendal, Cumbria
Leicester Lions	Westleigh Park	2,000	Blaby, Leicestershire
Loughborough Students	Loughborough University Stadium	3,000	Loughborough, Leicestershire
Macclesfield	Priory Park	1,250 (250 seats)	Macclesfield, Cheshire
Nuneaton	Liberty Way	3,800 (500 seats)	Nuneaton, Warwickshire
Preston Grasshoppers	Lightfoot Green	2,250 (250 seats)	Preston, Lancashire

== Final league table ==
2008–09 National Division Three North table
Pos	Team	Pld	W	D	L	PF	PA	PD	TB	LB	Pts	Qualification
1	Nuneaton (C)	26	21	1	4	820	465	+355	15	2	103	Promoted
2	Caldy	26	17	1	8	678	485	+193	10	4	84	
3	Macclesfield	26	16	2	8	643	518	+125	7	6	81	
4	Fylde	26	15	2	9	762	541	+221	12	5	81	
5	Harrogate	26	16	0	10	632	606	+26	11	4	79	
6	Loughborough Students	26	15	2	9	605	509	+96	10	1	75	
7	Leicester Lions	26	15	0	11	623	497	+126	6	4	70	
8	Kendal	26	13	1	12	646	522	+124	9	4	63 (Note: 4 points deducted)	
9	Preston Grasshoppers	26	11	0	15	610	638	−28	7	4	55	
10	Huddersfield	26	10	2	14	549	618	−69	2	5	51	
11	Hull Ionians	26	9	2	15	519	555	−36	6	5	51	
12	Bradford & Bingley	26	9	1	16	560	869	−309	6	2	46	
13	Darlington Mowden Park (R)	26	6	1	19	467	692	−225	3	9	38	Relegated
14	Halifax (R)	26	1	1	24	339	938	−599	2	2	10	Relegated

Updated to match(es) played on 16-05-2009. Source: Rugby Statbunker
(C) Champion; (R) Relegated

== Results ==
=== Round 1 ===
6 September 2008

(BP) Fylde	35 - 18	Huddersfield
	Report

Woodlands Memorial Ground
Attendance: 497
Referee: Guy Steel Bodger

6 September 2008

Halifax	13 - 24	Preston Grasshoppers (BP)
	Report

Ovenden Park

6 September 2008

Harrogate	28 - 11	Bradford & Bingley
	Report

Claro Road
Referee: Mike Read

6 September 2008

Loughborough Students	14 - 22	Caldy
	Report

Loughborough University Stadium
Referee: Steve Lee

6 September 2008

(BP) Kendal	34 - 13	Darlington Mowden Park
	Report

Mint Bridge
Referee: D Edmunds

6 September 2008

Macclesfield	33 - 16	Hull Ionians
	Report

Priory Park
Attendance: 143
Referee: John Meredith

6 September 2008

(BP) Nuneaton	16 - 19	Leicester Lions
	Report

Liberty Way
Attendance: 237
Referee: Paul Kimber

=== Round 2 ===
13 September 2008

Bradford & Bingley	13 - 26	Macclesfield
	Report

Wagon Lane
Attendance: 235
Referee: Simon McDowell

13 September 2008

Darlington Mowden Park	18 - 13	Caldy (BP)
	Report

Yiewsley Drive
Attendance: 125
Referee: Revis Phillips

13 September 2008

Huddersfield	24 - 3	Halifax
	Report

Lockwood Park
Attendance: 237
Referee: Steve Lee

13 September 2008

Hull Ionians	28 - 13	Kendal
	Report

Brantingham Park
Attendance: 300
Referee: Mark Liddell

13 September 2008

Leicester Lions	25 - 21	Fylde (BP)
	Report

Westleigh Park
Attendance: 100
Referee: Trevor Fisher

13 September 2008

(BP) Nuneaton	41 - 30	Loughborough Students
	Report

Liberty Way
Attendance: 175
Referee: Matthew Daubney

13 September 2008

Preston Grasshoppers	8 - 27	Harrogate
	Report

Lightfoot Green
Attendance: 237

=== Round 3 ===
20 September 2008

Caldy	20 - 19	Hull Ionians (BP)
	Report

Paton Field
Attendance: 282
Referee: John Meredith

20 September 2008

Fylde	27 - 27	Nuneaton
	Report

Woodlands Memorial Ground
Attendance: 410
Referee: Marcus Caton

20 September 2008

Halifax	13 - 57	Leicester Lions (BP)
	Report

Ovenden Park
Attendance: 150
Referee: Glenn O'Hara

20 September 2008

Harrogate	27 - 20	Huddersfield (BP)
	Report

Claro Road
Attendance: 208
Referee: Matthew Daubney

20 September 2008

(BP) Kendal	35 - 29	Bradford & Bingley (2BP)
	Report

Mint Bridge
Attendance: 583
Referee: Steve Harland

20 September 2008

Loughborough Students	19 - 17	Darlington Mowden Park (BP)
	Report

Loughborough University Stadium
Attendance: 250
Referee: Gareth Hodges

20 September 2008

(BP) Macclesfield	35 - 14	Preston Grasshoppers
	Report

Priory Park
Attendance: 164
Referee: Steve Lee

=== Round 4 ===
27 September 2008

Bradford & Bingley	6 - 50	Caldy (BP)
	Report

Wagon Lane
Attendance: 230
Referee: Tim Fisher

27 September 2008

(BP) Fylde	52 - 30	Loughborough Students
	Report

Woodlands Memorial Ground
Attendance: 350
Referee: Andrew Vertigan

27 September 2008

Huddersfield	19 - 18	Macclesfield (BP)
	Report

Lockwood Park
Attendance: 210
Referee: D Edmunds

27 September 2008

(BP) Hull Ionians	33 - 10	Darlington Mowden Park
	Report

Brantingham Park
Attendance: 300
Referee: Mick Reid

27 September 2008

(BP) Leicester Lions	35 - 14	Harrogate
	Report

Westleigh Park
Attendance: 160

27 September 2008

(BP) Nuneaton	39 - 10	Halifax
	Report

Liberty Way
Attendance: 230
Referee: John Meredith

27 September 2008

Preston Grasshoppers	23 - 15	Kendal
	Report

Lightfoot Green
Attendance: 329
Referee: Matthew Daubney

=== Round 5 ===
4 October 2008

Caldy	16 - 12	Preston Grasshoppers (BP)
	Report

Paton Field
Attendance: 127
Referee: Gareth Hodges

4 October 2008

(BP) Darlington Mowden Park	14 - 20	Bradford & Bingley
	Report

Yiewsley Drive
Attendance: 172
Referee: Steve Lee

4 October 2008

Halifax	17 - 35	Fylde (BP)
	Report

Ovenden Park
Attendance: 200
Referee: Ian Robinson

4 October 2008

(BP) Harrogate	17 - 23	Nuneaton
	Report

Claro Road
Attendance: 150
Referee: John Meredith

4 October 2008

Loughborough Students	3 - 3	Hull Ionians
	Report

Loughborough University Stadium
Referee: Greg Garner

4 October 2008

Macclesfield	26 - 6	Leicester Lions
	Report

Priory Park
Attendance: 167
Referee: D Edmunds

4 October 2008

Kendal	P - P	Huddersfield

- Postponed. Game rescheduled to 16 May 2009.

=== Round 6 ===
11 October 2008

Bradford & Bingley	28 - 19	Hull Ionians
	Report

Wagon Lane
Attendance: 165
Referee: James Fisher

11 October 2008

(BP) Fylde	62 - 13	Harrogate
	Report

Woodlands Memorial Ground
Attendance: 475
Referee: Mark Liddell

11 October 2008

Halifax	13 - 36	Loughborough Students (BP)
	Report

Ovenden Park
Attendance: 150
Referee: Matthew Daubney

11 October 2008

Huddersfield	9 - 37	Caldy (BP)
	Report

Lockwood Park
Attendance: 189
Referee: Mick Reid

11 October 2008

Leicester Lions	12 - 40	Kendal (BP)
	Report

Westleigh Park
Attendance: 120
Referee: Steve Lee

11 October 2008

(BP) Nuneaton	41 - 35	Macclesfield (2BP)
	Report

Liberty Way
Attendance: 213
Referee: D Edmunds

11 October 2008

(BP) Preston Grasshoppers	36 - 8	Darlington Mowden Park
	Report

Lightfoot Green
Attendance: 263
Referee: Ross Campbell

=== Round 7 ===
25 October 2008

(BP) Caldy	29 - 12	Leicester Lions
	Report

Paton Field
Referee: Eric Woodmason

25 October 2008

(BP) Darlington Mowden Park	26 - 28	Huddersfield
	Report

Yiewsley Drive
Attendance: 160
Referee: Matthew Daubney

25 October 2008

(BP) Harrogate	29 - 12	Halifax
	Report

Claro Road
Attendance: 250
Referee: Guy Steel Bodger

25 October 2008

Hull Ionians	17 - 12	Preston Grasshoppers (BP)
	Report

Brantingham Park
Attendance: 350
Referee: Mick Reid

25 October 2008

(BP) Loughborough Students	44 - 23	Bradford & Bingley
	Report

Loughborough University Stadium
Attendance: 250
Referee: Chris Seeley

25 October 2008

Macclesfield	15 - 12	Fylde (BP)
	Report

Priory Park
Attendance: 178
Referee: Steve Lee

25 October 2008

Kendal	P - P	Nuneaton

- Postponed. Game rescheduled to 11 April 2009.

=== Round 8 ===
1 November 2008

Fylde	24 - 24	Kendal (BP)
	Report

Woodlands Memorial Ground
Attendance: 630
Referee: D Edmunds

1 November 2008

Halifax	13 - 13	Macclesfield
	Report

Ovenden Park
Attendance: 190
Referee: Eric Woodmason

1 November 2008

(BP) Harrogate	31 - 19	Loughborough Students
	Report

Claro Road
Attendance: 257
Referee: Lee Towers

1 November 2008

Huddersfield	31 - 29	Hull Ionians (2BP)
	Report

Lockwood Park
Attendance: 203
Referee: Tom Davis

1 November 2008

Leicester Lions	13 - 12	Darlington Mowden Park (BP)
	Report

Westleigh Park
Attendance: 150
Referee: Ian Robinson

1 November 2008

Nuneaton	23 - 31	Caldy (BP)
	Report

Liberty Way
Attendance: 148
Referee: Glenn O'Hara

1 November 2008

(BP) Preston Grasshoppers	49 - 16	Bradford & Bingley
	Report

Lightfoot Green
Attendance: 264
Referee: Guy Steel Bodger

=== Round 9 ===
8 November 2008

Bradford & Bingley	25 - 25	Huddersfield
	Report

Wagon Lane
Attendance: 170
Referee: Ian Robinson

8 November 2008

(BP) Caldy	33 - 23	Fylde
	Report

Paton Field
Attendance: 319
Referee: Tim Fisher

8 November 2008

Darlington Mowden Park	17 - 44	Nuneaton (BP)
	Report

Yiewsley Drive
Attendance: 143
Referee: Revis Phillips

8 November 2008

(BP) Hull Ionians	16 - 19	Leicester Lions
	Report

Brantingham Park
Attendance: 300
Referee: Adam Friend

8 November 2008

Kendal	23 - 12	Halifax
	Report

Mint Bridge
Referee: Matthew Daubney

8 November 2008

(BP) Loughborough Students	29 - 24	Preston Grasshoppers (BP)
	Report

Loughborough University Stadium
Attendance: 150
Referee: Marcus Caton

8 November 2008

(BP) Macclesfield	27 - 28	Harrogate (BP)
	Report

Priory Park
Attendance: 204
Referee: Mike Read

=== Round 10 ===
15 November 2008

(BP) Fylde	61 - 15	Darlington Mowden Park
	Report

Woodlands Memorial Ground
Attendance: 475
Referee: Simon McConnell

15 November 2008

Halifax	15 - 39	Caldy (BP)
	Report

Ovenden Park
Attendance: 199
Referee: D Edmunds

15 November 2008

(BP) Harrogate	31 - 30	Kendal (2BP)
	Report

Claro Road
Attendance: 125
Referee: Steve Lee

15 November 2008

Huddersfield	24 - 9	Preston Grasshoppers
	Report

Lockwood Park
Attendance: 236
Referee: Brendan Fitzmaurice

15 November 2008

(BP) Leicester Lions	23 - 28	Bradford & Bingley
	Report

Westleigh Park
Attendance: 120
Referee: Simon Harding

15 November 2008

(BP) Macclesfield	33 - 17	Loughborough Students
	Report

Priory Park
Attendance: 147
Referee: Marcus Caton

15 November 2008

(BP) Nuneaton	29 - 6	Hull Ionians
	Report

Liberty Way
Attendance: 127
Referee: Richard Parker-Sedgmore

=== Round 11 ===
29 November 2008

(BP) Bradford & Bingley	16 - 19	Nuneaton
	Report

Wagon Lane
Referee: Steve Lee

29 November 2008

(BP) Darlington Mowden Park	38 - 31	Halifax (2BP)
	Report

Yiewsley Drive
Attendance: 100
Referee: Mike Read

29 November 2008

Hull Ionians	10 - 21	Fylde
	Report

Brantingham Park
Attendance: 150
Referee: Marcus Caton

29 November 2008

Kendal	28 - 23	Macclesfield (BP)
	Report

Mint Bridge
Attendance: 375
Referee: Tom Davis

29 November 2008

Loughborough Students	16 - 27	Huddersfield
	Report

Loughborough University Stadium
Attendance: 65
Referee: Ian Tempest

29 November 2008

Preston Grasshoppers	34 - 8	Leicester Lions
	Report

Lightfoot Green
Attendance: 278
Referee: John Meredith

29 November 2008

Caldy	P - P	Harrogate

- Postponed. Game rescheduled to 17 January 2009.

=== Round 12 ===
6 December 2008

(BP) Fylde	27 - 8	Bradford & Bingley
	Report

Woodlands Memorial Ground
Attendance: 475
Referee: Ross Campbell

6 December 2008

Leicester Lions	16 - 9	Huddersfield (BP)
	Report

Westleigh Park
Attendance: 120
Referee: Matthew Daubney

6 December 2008

Macclesfield	19 - 16	Caldy (BP)
	Report

Priory Park
Attendance: 276
Referee: Philip Davis

6 December 2008

(BP) Nuneaton	46 - 22	Preston Grasshoppers (BP)
	Report

Liberty Way
Attendance: 175
Referee: Paul Kimber

6 December 2008

Halifax	P - P	Hull Ionians

- Postponed. Game rescheduled to 14 March 2009.

6 December 2008

Harrogate	P - P	Darlington Mowden Park

- Postponed. Game rescheduled to 14 March 2009.

6 December 2008

Kendal	P - P	Loughborough Students

- Postponed. Game rescheduled to 25 April 2009.

=== Round 13 ===
20 December 2008

(BP) Bradford & Bingley	32 - 12	Halifax
	Report

Wagon Lane
Attendance: 375
Referee: D Edmunds

20 December 2008

Caldy	31 - 20	Kendal
	Report

Paton Field
Attendance: 341
Referee: Matthew Daubney

20 December 2008

Darlington Mowden Park	19 - 31	Macclesfield (BP)
	Report

Yiewsley Drive
Attendance: 130
Referee: Trevor Fisher

20 December 2008

Huddersfield	6 - 20	Nuneaton
	Report

Lockwood Park
Attendance: 283
Referee: Andrew Jackson

20 December 2008

(BP) Hull Ionians	12 - 16	Harrogate
	Report

Brantingham Park
Attendance: 350
Referee: Nick Cockburn

20 December 2008

Loughborough Students	20 - 6	Leicester Lions
	Report

Loughborough University Stadium
Attendance: 150
Referee: Steve Lee

20 December 2008

Preston Grasshoppers	14 - 12	Fylde (BP)
	Report

Lightfoot Green
Attendance: 758
Referee: James Fisher

=== Round 14 ===
3 January 2009

(BP) Halifax	35 - 43	Huddersfield
	Report

Ovenden Park
Attendance: 361
Referee: Clare Daniels

3 January 2009

Loughborough Students	7 - 23	Nuneaton
	Report

Loughborough University Stadium
Attendance: 150
Referee: Mark Liddell

3 January 2009

Caldy	P - P	Darlington Mowden Park

- Postponed. Game rescheduled to 11 April 2009.

3 January 2009

Fylde	P - P	Leicester Lions

- Postponed. Game rescheduled to 17 January 2009.

3 January 2009

Harrogate	P - P	Preston Grasshoppers

- Postponed. Game rescheduled to 11 April 2009.

3 January 2009

Kendal	P - P	Hull Ionians

- Postponed. Game rescheduled to 2 May 2009.

3 January 2009

Macclesfield	P - P	Bradford & Bingley

- Postponed. Game rescheduled to 17 January 2009.

=== Round 15 ===
10 January 2009

Bradford & Bingley	P - P	Kendal

- Postponed. Game rescheduled to 9 May 2009.

10 January 2009

Darlington Mowden Park	P - P	Loughborough Students

- Postponed. Game rescheduled to 17 January 2009.

10 January 2009

Huddersfield	P - P	Harrogate

- Postponed. Game rescheduled to 25 April 2009.

10 January 2009

Hull Ionians	P - P	Caldy

- Postponed. Game rescheduled to 25 April 2009.

10 January 2009

Leicester Lions	P - P	Halifax

- Postponed. Game rescheduled to 11 April 2009.

10 January 2009

Nuneaton	P - P	Fylde

- Postponed. Game rescheduled to 9 May 2009.

10 January 2009

Preston Grasshoppers	P - P	Macclesfield

- Postponed. Game rescheduled to 14 March 2009.

=== Rounds 11, 14 & 15 (rescheduled games) ===
17 January 2009

Caldy	28 - 14	Harrogate
	Report

Paton Field
Attendance: 219
Referee: John Meredith

- Game rescheduled from 29 November 2008.

17 January 2009

Darlington Mowden Park	8 - 20	Loughborough Students
	Report

Yiewsley Drive
Attendance: 120
Referee: Steve Lee

- Game rescheduled from 10 January 2009.

17 January 2009

Fylde	18 - 7	Leicester Lions
	Report

Woodlands Memorial Ground
Attendance: 425
Referee: Eric Woodmason

- Game rescheduled from 3 January 2009.

17 January 2009

Macclesfield	20 - 39	Bradford & Bingley (BP)
	Report

Priory Park
Attendance: 310
Referee: Revis Phillips

- Game rescheduled from 3 January 2009.

=== Round 16 ===
24 January 2009

(BP) Caldy	41 - 10	Bradford & Bingley
	Report

Paton Field
Attendance: 226
Referee: Marcus Caton

24 January 2009

(BP) Darlington Mowden Park	19 - 22	Hull Ionians
	Report

Yiewsley Drive
Attendance: 110
Referee: Trevor Fisher

24 January 2009

Halifax	14 - 37	Nuneaton (BP)
	Report

Ovenden Park
Attendance: 167
Referee: Nick Cockburn

24 January 2009

Harrogate	15 - 14	Leicester Lions (BP)
	Report

Claro Road
Attendance: 170
Referee: Mike Read

24 January 2009

(BP) Kendal	33 - 12	Preston Grasshoppers
	Report

Mint Bridge
Attendance: 632
Referee: D Edmunds

24 January 2009

Loughborough Students	15 - 10	Fylde (BP)
	Report

Loughborough University Stadium
Attendance: 100
Referee: Glenn O'Hara

24 January 2009

Macclesfield	27 - 23	Huddersfield (BP)
	Report

Priory Park
Attendance: 286
Referee: Chris Seeley

=== Round 17 ===
31 January 2009

(BP) Bradford & Bingley	32 - 17	Darlington Mowden Park
	Report

Wagon Lane
Attendance: 250
Referee: Andrew Vertigan

31 January 2009

(BP) Fylde	36 - 5	Halifax
	Report

Woodlands Memorial Ground
Attendance: 435
Referee: Matthew Daubney

31 January 2009

Huddersfield	17 - 26	Kendal
	Report

Lockwood Park
Attendance: 247
Referee: D Edmunds

31 January 2009

Hull Ionians	19 - 11	Loughborough Students
	Report

Brantingham Park
Attendance: 200
Referee: Guy Steel Bodger

31 January 2009

Leicester Lions	16 - 10	Macclesfield (BP)
	Report

Westleigh Park
Attendance: 100
Referee: Ross Campbell

31 January 2009

(BP) Nuneaton	32 - 9	Harrogate
	Report

Liberty Way
Attendance: 153
Referee: Claudio Castagnoli

31 January 2009

Preston Grasshoppers	23 - 19	Caldy (BP)
	Report

Lightfoot Green
Attendance: 278
Referee: Mike Read

=== Round 18 ===
7 February 2009

Caldy	22 - 13	Huddersfield
	Report

Paton Field
Attendance: 211
Referee: James Fisher

7 February 2009

(BP) Hull Ionians	30 - 10	Bradford & Bingley
	Report

Brantingham Park
Attendance: 250
Referee: Mike Read

7 February 2009

Darlington Mowden Park	P - P	Preston Grasshoppers

- Postponed. Game rescheduled to 2 May 2009.

7 February 2009

Harrogate	P - P	Fylde

- Postponed. Game rescheduled to 2 May 2009.

7 February 2009

Kendal	P - P	Leicester Lions

- Postponed. Game rescheduled to 14 March 2009.

7 February 2009

Loughborough Students	P - P	Halifax

- Postponed. Game rescheduled to 2 May 2009.

7 February 2009

Macclesfield	P - P	Nuneaton

- Postponed. Game rescheduled to 2 May 2009.

=== Round 19 ===
14 February 2009

Bradford & Bingley	20 - 38	Loughborough Students (BP)
	Report

Wagon Lane
Attendance: 150
Referee: Rob Sheard

14 February 2009

(BP) Fylde	17 - 24	Macclesfield
	Report

Woodlands Memorial Ground
Attendance: 350
Referee: Chris Sharp

14 February 2009

(BP) Leicester Lions	7 - 9	Caldy
	Report

Westleigh Park
Attendance: 120
Referee: Steve Harland

14 February 2009

Nuneaton	21 - 13	Kendal
	Report

Liberty Way
Attendance: 330
Referee: J Matthews

14 February 2009

Preston Grasshoppers	23 - 10	Hull Ionians
	Report

Lightfoot Green
Referee: Matthew Daubney

14 February 2009

Halifax	P - P	Harrogate

- Postponed. Game rescheduled to 5 May 2009.

14 February 2009

Huddersfield	P - P	Darlington Mowden Park

- Postponed. Game rescheduled to 9 May 2009.

=== Round 20 ===
21 February 2009

Bradford & Bingley	23 - 51	Preston Grasshoppers (BP)
	Report

Wagon Lane
Referee: Mark Liddell

21 February 2009

Caldy	7 - 15	Nuneaton
	Report

Paton Field
Attendance: 413
Referee: Philip Davis

21 February 2009

(BP) Darlington Mowden Park	20 - 21	Leicester Lions
	Report

Yiewsley Drive
Attendance: 100
Referee: Rob Sheard

21 February 2009

(BP) Hull Ionians	31 - 18	Huddersfield
	Report

Brantingham Park
Attendance: 300
Referee: Guy Steel Bodger

21 February 2009

(BP) Kendal	17 - 18	Fylde
	Report

Mint Bridge
Attendance: 575
Referee: Mick Reid

21 February 2009

(BP) Loughborough Students	25 - 26	Harrogate
	Report

Loughborough University Stadium
Attendance: 100
Referee: Brendan Fitzmaurice

21 February 2009

(BP) Macclesfield	35 - 15	Halifax
	Report

Priory Park
Attendance: 274
Referee: Tim Fisher

=== Round 21 ===
28 February 2009

Fylde	23 - 22	Caldy (BP)
	Report

Woodlands Memorial Ground
Attendance: 456
Referee: Mark Wilson

28 February 2009

Halifax	11 - 21	Kendal
	Report

Ovenden Park
Attendance: 203
Referee: Rob Sheard

28 February 2009

(BP) Harrogate	11 - 14	Macclesfield
	Report

Claro Road
Attendance: 250
Referee: Mark Liddell

28 February 2009

(BP) Huddersfield	18 - 22	Bradford & Bingley
	Report

Lockwood Park
Attendance: 213
Referee: Mick Reid

28 February 2009

Leicester Lions	27 - 10	Hull Ionians
	Report

Westleigh Park
Attendance: 100
Referee: Andrew Jackson

28 February 2009

Preston Grasshoppers	19 - 27	Loughborough Students (BP)
	Report

Lightfoot Green
Attendance: 328
Referee: D Edmunds

28 February 2009

Nuneaton	P - P	Darlington Mowden Park

- Postponed. Game rescheduled to 25 April 2009.

=== Round 22 ===
7 March 2009

Bradford & Bingley	16 - 64	Leicester Lions (BP)
	Report

Wagon Lane
Attendance: 150
Referee: Brendan Fitzmaurice

7 March 2009

(BP) Caldy	52 - 7	Halifax
	Report

Paton Field
Referee: Chris Seeley

7 March 2009

Darlington Mowden Park	18 - 39	Fylde (BP)
	Report

Yiewsley Drive
Attendance: 150
Referee: Guy Steel Bodger

7 March 2009

Hull Ionians	8 - 30	Nuneaton (BP)
	Report

Brantingham Park
Attendance: 300
Referee: Matthew Daubney

7 March 2009

Kendal	5 - 24	Harrogate (BP)
	Report

Mint Bridge
Attendance: 446
Referee: Eric Woodmason

7 March 2009

(BP) Loughborough Students	27 - 18	Macclesfield
	Report

Loughborough University Stadium
Referee: Mick Reid

7 March 2009

Preston Grasshoppers	17 - 13	Huddersfield (BP)
	Report

Lightfoot Green
Attendance: 303
Referee: Rob Sheard

=== Rounds 12, 15 & 18 (rescheduled games) ===
14 March 2009

Halifax	20 - 35	Hull Ionians (BP)
	Report

Ovenden Park
Attendance: 149
Referee: Trevor Fisher

- Game rescheduled from 6 December 2008.

14 March 2009

(BP) Harrogate	33 - 10	Darlington Mowden Park
	Report

Claro Road
Attendance: 120
Referee: Mark Liddell

- Game rescheduled from 6 December 2008.

14 March 2009

(BP) Kendal	13 - 18	Leicester Lions
	Report

Mint Bridge
Attendance: 548
Referee: Mick Reid

- Game rescheduled from 7 February 2009.

14 March 2009

(BP) Preston Grasshoppers	22 - 26	Macclesfield
	Report

Lightfoot Green
Attendance: 203
Referee: Chris Seeley

- Game rescheduled from 10 January 2009.

=== Round 23 ===
21 March 2009

(BP) Fylde	38 - 14	Hull Ionians
	Report

Woodlands Memorial Ground
Attendance: 1,644
Referee: Rob Sheard

21 March 2009

(BP) Halifax	17 - 19	Darlington Mowden Park
	Report

Ovenden Park
Attendance: 130
Referee: Mark Liddell

21 March 2009

(2BP) Harrogate	41 - 44	Caldy (BP)
	Report

Claro Road
Attendance: 280
Referee: Andrew Vertigan

21 March 2009

Huddersfield	15 - 15	Loughborough Students
	Report

Lockwood Park
Attendance: 119
Referee: Trevor Fisher

21 March 2009

(BP) Leicester Lions	49 - 33	Preston Grasshoppers (BP)
	Report

Westleigh Park
Attendance: 120
Referee: Ian Tempest

21 March 2009

(BP) Macclesfield	29 - 14	Kendal
	Report

Priory Park
Attendance: 187
Referee: Andrew Bickle

21 March 2009

(BP) Nuneaton	51 - 10	Bradford & Bingley
	Report

Liberty Way
Attendance: 210
Referee: Revis Phillips

=== Round 24 ===
28 March 2009

Bradford & Bingley	15 - 54	Fylde (BP)
	Report

Wagon Lane
Attendance: 95
Referee: Andrew Jackson

28 March 2009

Caldy	25 - 39	Macclesfield (BP)
	Report

Paton Field
Attendance: 250
Referee: D Edmunds

28 March 2009

(BP) Darlington Mowden Park	15 - 21	Harrogate
	Report

Yiewsley Drive
Referee: Chris Seeley

28 March 2009

Huddersfield	13 - 27	Leicester Lions (BP)
	Report

Lockwood Park
Attendance: 172
Referee: Lee Towers

28 March 2009

(BP) Hull Ionians	43 - 8	Halifax
	Report

Brantingham Park
Attendance: 250
Referee: Trevor Fisher

28 March 2009

(BP) Loughborough Students	33 - 5	Kendal
	Report

Loughborough University Stadium
Attendance: 150

28 March 2009

Preston Grasshoppers	24 - 50	Nuneaton (BP)
	Report

Lightfoot Green
Attendance: 301
Referee: Mark Wilson

=== Round 25 ===
4 April 2009

(BP) Fylde	41 - 25	Preston Grasshoppers
	Report

Woodlands Memorial Ground
Attendance: 1,050
Referee: Mike Read

4 April 2009

Halifax	22 - 61	Bradford & Bingley (BP)
	Report

Ovenden Park
Attendance: 155
Referee: Ian Tempest

4 April 2009

(BP) Harrogate	37 - 27	Hull Ionians
	Report

Claro Road
Attendance: 250
Referee: Rob Sheard

4 April 2009

(BP) Kendal	35 - 12	Caldy
	Report

Mint Bridge
Attendance: 690
Referee: Guy Steel Bodger

4 April 2009

Leicester Lions	19 - 36	Loughborough Students (BP)
	Report

Westleigh Park
Attendance: 150
Referee: Matthew Daubney

4 April 2009

(BP) Macclesfield	24 - 29	Darlington Mowden Park
	Report

Priory Park
Attendance: 187
Referee: Eric Woodmason

4 April 2009

(BP) Nuneaton	42 - 22	Huddersfield
	Report

Liberty Way
Attendance: 283
Referee: Nick Cockburn

=== Rounds 7, 14 & 15 (rescheduled games) ===
11 April 2009

Caldy	16 - 16	Darlington Mowden Park
	Report

Paton Field
Attendance: 273
Referee: Mark Rose

- Game rescheduled from 3 January 2009.

11 April 2009

(BP) Harrogate	45 - 17	Preston Grasshoppers
	Report

Claro Road
Attendance: 250
Referee: Revis Phillips

- Game rescheduled from 3 January 2009.

11 April 2009

(BP) Kendal	44 - 29	Nuneaton (BP)
	Report

Mint Bridge
Attendance: 650
Referee: Eric Woodmason

- Game rescheduled from 25 October 2008.

11 April 2009

(BP) Leicester Lions	83 - 3	Halifax
	Report

Westleigh Park
Attendance: 140
Referee: Tom Davis

- Game rescheduled from 10 January 2009.

=== Round 26 ===
18 April 2009

(BP) Bradford & Bingley	43 - 24	Harrogate (BP)
	Report

Wagon Lane
Attendance: 200
Referee: D Edmunds

18 April 2009

Caldy	15 - 25	Loughborough Students
	Report

Paton Field
Attendance: 419
Referee: James Fisher

18 April 2009

Darlington Mowden Park	22 - 19	Kendal (BP)
	Report

Yiewsley Drive
Attendance: 165
Referee: Matthew Daubney

18 April 2009

(BP) Huddersfield	44 - 32	Fylde (BP)
	Report

Lockwood Park
Attendance: 227
Referee: Chris Seeley

18 April 2009

Hull Ionians	22 - 22	Macclesfield
	Report

Brantingham Park
Attendance: 350
Referee: Guy Steel Bodger

18 April 2009

(BP) Leicester Lions	20 - 25	Nuneaton
	Report

Westleigh Park
Attendance: 200
Referee: Steve Lee

18 April 2009

(BP) Preston Grasshoppers	48 - 7	Halifax
	Report

Lightfoot Green
Attendance: 372
Referee: Revis Phillips

=== Rounds 12, 15 & 21 (rescheduled games) ===
25 April 2009

(BP) Huddersfield	43 - 25	Harrogate
	Report

Lockwood Park
Attendance: 189
Referee: Mike Read

- Game rescheduled from 10 January 2009.

25 April 2009

(BP) Hull Ionians	27 - 29	Caldy
	Report

Brantingham Park
Attendance: 150
Referee: Trevor Fisher

- Game rescheduled from 10 January 2009.

25 April 2009

Kendal	20 - 29	Loughborough Students (BP)
	Report

Mint Bridge
Attendance: 660
Referee: Brendan Fitzmaurice

- Game rescheduled from 6 December 2008.

25 April 2009

(BP) Nuneaton	31 - 25	Darlington Mowden Park (2BP)
	Report

Liberty Way
Attendance: 225
Referee: Philip Davis

- Game rescheduled from 28 February 2009.

=== Rounds 14 & 18 (rescheduled games) ===
2 May 2009

(BP) Darlington Mowden Park	29 - 15	Preston Grasshoppers
	Report

Yiewsley Drive
Attendance: 200
Referee: Mike Read

- Game rescheduled from 7 February 2009.

2 May 2009

(BP) Harrogate	36 - 19	Fylde
	Report

Claro Road
Attendance: 175
Referee: Rob Sheard

- Game rescheduled from 7 February 2009.

2 May 2009

Kendal	28 - 13	Hull Ionians
	Report

Mint Bridge
Attendance: 420
Referee: Matthew Daubney

- Game rescheduled from 3 January 2009.

2 May 2009

Loughborough Students	20 - 0 (Note: Game was awarded to Loughborough Students as a bonus point win as Halifax failed to turn up to the game.)	Halifax
	Report

Loughborough University Stadium
Attendance: N/A
Referee: N/A

- Game rescheduled from 7 February 2009.

2 May 2009

Macclesfield	21 - 16	Nuneaton (BP)
	Report

Priory Park
Attendance: 250
Referee: Ian Tempest

- Game rescheduled from 7 February 2009.

=== Round 19 (rescheduled game) ===
5 May 2009

Halifax	11 - 10	Harrogate (BP)
	Report

Ovenden Park
Attendance: 125
Referee: Mike Read

- Game rescheduled from 14 February 2009.

=== Rounds 15 & 19 (rescheduled games) ===
9 May 2009

Bradford & Bingley	0 - 68	Kendal (BP)
	Report

Wagon Lane
Attendance: 220
Referee: Andrew Jackson

- Game rescheduled from 10 January 2009.

9 May 2009

Huddersfield	19 - 13	Darlington Mowden Park (BP)
	Report

Lockwood Park
Attendance: 119
Referee: Nick Cockburn

- Game rescheduled from 14 February 2009.

9 May 2009

Nuneaton	50 - 5	Fylde
	Report

Liberty Way
Attendance: 203
Referee: Tom Davis

- Game rescheduled from 10 January 2009.

=== Round 5 (rescheduled game) ===
16 May 2009

Kendal	23 - 8	Huddersfield
	Report

Mint Bridge
Attendance: 420
Referee: Ian Tempest

- Game rescheduled from 4 October 2008.

== Total season attendances ==
Club	Home Games	Total	Average	Highest	Lowest	% Capacity
Bradford & Bingley	11 (Note: Missing home attendances v Nuneaton on 29 November 2008 and Preston Grasshoppers on 21 February 2009.)	2,240	204	375	95	5%
Caldy	11 (Note: Missing home attendances v Leicester Lions on 25 October 2008 and Halifax on 7 March 2009.)	3,080	280	419	127	7%
Darlington Mowden Park	12 (Note: Missing home attendance v Harrogate on 28 March 2009.)	1,675	140	200	100	
Fylde	13	7,672	590	1,644	350	8%
Halifax	12 (Note: Missing home attendance v Preston Grasshoppers on 6 September 2008.)	2,179	182	361	125	
Harrogate	12 (Note: Missing home attendance v Bradford & Bingley on 6 September 2008.)	2,485	207	280	120	5%
Huddersfield	13	2,644	203	283	119	14%
Hull Ionians	13	3,550	273	350	150	18%
Kendal	11 (Note: Missing home attendances v Darlington Mowden Park on 6 September 2008 and Halifax on 8 November 2008.)	5,999	545	690	375	12%
Leicester Lions	13	1,700	131	200	100	7%
Loughborough Students	9 (Note: Only played 12 home games as Halifax failed to turn up to their game on 2 May 2009. Missing home attendances v Caldy on 6 September 2008, Hull Ionians on 4 October 2008 and Macclesfield on 7 March 2009.)	1,365	152	250	65	5%
Macclesfield	13	2,773	213	310	143	17%
Nuneaton	13	2,709	208	330	127	5%
Preston Grasshoppers	12 (Note: Missing home attendance v Hull Ionians on 14 February 2009.)	3,914	326	758	203	14%

== Individual statistics ==
- Note if players are tied on tries or points the player with the lowest number of appearances will come first. Also note that points scorers includes tries as well as conversions, penalties and drop goals.

=== Top points scorers ===
Rank	Player	Team	Appearances	Points
1	(Wales) Gavin Roberts	Caldy	22	290
2	(England) Ross Winney	Macclesfield	25	215
3	(England) Chris Johnson	Huddersfield	22	248
4	(England) Jon Boden	Leicester Lions	24	229
5	(England) Stephen Nutt	Fylde	20	216
6	(England) Hugh Thomas	Nuneaton	26	189
7	(England) Marcus Jackson	Preston Grasshoppers	18	186
8	(England) Rickie Aley	Nuneaton	12	150
9	(England) Steve Brimacombe	Nuneaton	21	146
10	(England) Gareth Collins	Leicester Lions	26	145

=== Top try scorers ===
Rank	Player	Team	Appearances	Tries
1	(England) Gareth Collins	Leicester Lions	26	29
2	(England) Lewis Boyd	Kendal	26	28
3	(England) Nick Royle	Fylde	17	24
3	(England) Oliver Brennand	Fylde	24	24
4	(England) William Cave	Nuneaton	21	16
5	(England) Fergus Mulchrone	Macclesfield	23	15
5	(England) Mark Turner	Caldy	24	15
6	(England) Rob Cook	Nuneaton	25	14
6	(England) Gary Holmes	Nuneaton	26	14
6	(New Zealand) Aaron Takarangi	Nuneaton	26	14
6	(England) Andrew Soutar	Caldy	26	14

== Season records ==
=== Team ===
Largest home win — 80 pts

83 - 3 Leicester Lions at home to Halifax on 11 April 2009

Largest away win — 68 pts

68 - 0 Kendal away to Bradford & Bingley on 9 May 2009

Most points scored — 83 pts

83 - 3 Leicester Lions at home to Halifax on 11 April 2009

Most tries in a match — 13

Leicester Lions at home to Halifax on 11 April 2009

Most conversions in a match — 9

Leicester Lions at home to Halifax on 11 April 2009

Most penalties in a match — 8

Huddersfield away to Halifax on 3 January 2009

Most drop goals in a match — 3 (x2)

Nuneaton at home to Macclesfield on 11 October 2008
Nuneaton away to Bradford & Bingley on 29 November 2008

=== Player ===
Most points in a match — 30 (x2)

(England) Gareth Collins for Leicester Lions away to Bradford & Bingley on 7 March 2009
(England) Gareth Collins for Leicester Lions at home to Halifax on 11 April 2009

Most tries in a match — 6 (x2)

(England) Gareth Collins for Leicester Lions away to Bradford & Bingley on 7 March 2009
(England) Gareth Collins for Leicester Lions at home to Halifax on 11 April 2009

Most conversions in a match — 9

(England) Jon Boden for Leicester Lions at home to Halifax on 11 April 2009

Most penalties in a match — (x6)

(England) Ross Winney for Macclesfield at home to Hull Ionians on 6 September 2008
(England) Rickie Aley for Nuneaton away to Harrogate on 4 October 2008
(England) Jon Benson for Darlington Mowden Park at home to Fylde on 7 March 2009

Most drop goals in a match — 3 (x2)

(England) Rickie Aley for Nuneaton at home to Macclesfield on 11 October 2008
(England) Rickie Aley for Nuneaton away to Bradford & Bingley on 29 November 2008

=== Attendances ===
Highest — 1,644

Fylde at home to Hull Ionians on 21 March 2009

Lowest — 65

Loughborough Students at home to Huddersfield on 29 November 2008

Highest Average Attendance — 590

Fylde

Lowest Average Attendance — 131

Leicester Lions

== See also ==
- English Rugby Union Leagues
- English rugby union system
- Rugby union in England
