= 2005–06 National Division Three North =

Rugby union competition in England

- Countries: England
- Champions: Bradford & Bingley
- Runners-up: Nuneaton (also promoted)
- Relegated: Kendal, New Brighton
- Attendance: 38,787 (average 266 per match) (Note: Note that 36 home attendances are missing (see below) - so the total attendance will not be 100% accurate. The average attendance has also been taken into account with the missing games not included.)
- Highest attendance: 1,575; Fylde v Preston Grasshoppers; 7 January 2006
- Lowest attendance: 50; Leicester Lions v Cleckheaton; 7 January 2006
- Top point scorer: (England) Tom Rhodes (Bradford & Bingley); 270 points
- Top try scorer: (England) Alan Brown (Darlington); 25 tries

The 2005–06 National Division Three North was the sixth season (eighteenth overall) of the fourth division (north) of the English domestic rugby union competition using the name National Division Three North. New teams to the division included Nuneaton who were relegated from the 2004–05 National Division Two while Leicester Lions came up as champions of Midlands Division 1 along with Preston Grasshoppers (champions) and Hull Ionians (playoffs) who were promoted from North Division 1. The league system was 4 points for a win, 2 points for a draw and additional bonus points being awarded for scoring 4 or more tries and/or losing within 7 points of the victorious team. In terms of promotion the league champions would go straight up into National Division Two while the runners up would have a one-game playoff against the runners up from National Division Three South (at the home ground of the club with the superior league record) for the final promotion place.

After just missing out on the playoffs last season, Bradford & Bingley went two places better by winning the championship, finishing 13 points clear of runners up Nuneaton to gain promotion to the 2006–07 National Division Two. Nuneaton would, however, make an instance return to National Division Two after their relegation a season ago, by defeating 2005–06 National Division Three South runners up North Walsham away in the north–south playoff. There were only two relegation spots this year with the two teams to go down being Kendal and New Brighton. They were easily the weakest in the division with 13th placed New Brighton finishing 41 points behind 12th placed Leicester Lions. Both sides would drop down to North Division 1.

== Participating teams and locations ==
Locations of the 2005-06 National Division Three North teams

Team	Stadium	Capacity	City/Area
Blaydon	Crow Trees	2,000 (400 seats)	Swalwell, Tyne and Wear
Bradford & Bingley	Wagon Lane	4,000	Bingley, West Yorkshire
Cleckheaton	Cleckheaton Sports Club		Cleckheaton, West Yorkshire
Darlington	Blackwell Meadows	3,000	Darlington, County Durham
Darlington Mowden Park	Yiewsley Drive		Darlington, County Durham
Fylde	Woodlands Memorial Ground	7,500 (500 seats)	Lytham St. Annes, Lancashire
Hull Ionians	Brantingham Park	1,500 (240 seats)	Brantingham, East Riding of Yorkshire
Kendal	Mint Bridge	4,600 (600 seats)	Kendal, Cumbria
Leicester Lions	Westleigh Park	2,000	Blaby, Leicestershire
Macclesfield	Priory Park	1,250 (250 seats)	Macclesfield, Cheshire
New Brighton	Hartsfield	2,000	Wirral, Merseyside
Nuneaton	Liberty Way	3,800 (500 seats)	Nuneaton, Warwickshire
Preston Grasshoppers	Lightfoot Green	2,250 (250 seats)	Preston, Lancashire
Tynedale	Tynedale Park	2,000 (400 seats)	Corbridge, Northumberland

== Final league table ==
2005–06 National Division Three North table
Pos	Team	Pld	W	D	L	PF	PA	PD	TB	LB	Pts	Qualification
1	Bradford & Bingley (C)	26	23	1	2	934	465	+469	16	0	110	Promoted
2	Nuneaton (Note: Nuneaton's game away to Cleckheaton would be cancelled due to fixture congestion.) (P)	25	20	1	4	705	382	+323	12	3	97	Promotion play-off
3	Blaydon	26	20	0	6	792	386	+406	14	1	95	
4	Tynedale	26	16	1	9	650	430	+220	9	5	80	
5	Darlington	26	13	1	12	666	562	+104	17	6	77	
6	Preston Grasshoppers	26	13	3	10	763	605	+158	13	3	74	
7	Hull Ionians	26	12	1	13	565	581	−16	5	7	62	
8	Fylde (Note: Fylde's game at home to New Brighton would be cancelled due to fixture congestion.)	25	12	2	11	569	542	+27	7	1	60	
9	Macclesfield	26	10	2	14	560	520	+40	8	5	57	
10	Cleckheaton (Note: Cleckheaton's game at home to Nuneaton would be cancelled due to fixture congestion.)	25	11	0	14	476	550	−74	7	7	53 (Note: 5 points deducted)	
11	Darlington Mowden Park	26	10	1	15	472	578	−106	7	3	52	
12	Leicester Lions	26	9	2	15	484	732	−248	8	4	52	
13	New Brighton (Note: New Brighton's game away to Fylde would be cancelled due to fixture congestion.) (R)	25	2	0	23	358	1035	−677	2	1	11	Relegated
14	Kendal (R)	26	1	1	24	297	923	−626	1	1	8	Relegated

Updated to match(es) played on 06-05-2006. Source: Rugby Statbunker
(C) Champion; (P) Promoted; (R) Relegated

== Results ==
=== Round 1 ===
3 September 2005

(BP) Blaydon	30 - 22	Tynedale
	Report

Crow Trees
Referee: Andrew Gardner

3 September 2005

Cleckheaton	19 - 34	Bradford & Bingley (BP)
	Report

Cleckheaton Sports Club
Attendance: 800
Referee: Ian Robinson

3 September 2005

(BP) Darlington Mowden Park	28 - 28	Preston Grasshoppers (BP)
	Report

Yiewsley Drive
Attendance: 210
Referee: Mick Reid

3 September 2005

(BP) Fylde	34 - 15	Darlington
	Report

Woodlands Memorial Ground
Referee: Rob Sheard

3 September 2005

Kendal	5 - 43	Nuneaton (BP)
	Report

Mint Bridge
Attendance: 200
Referee: Matthew Daubney

3 September 2005

(BP) Leicester Lions	37 - 19	New Brighton
	Report

Westleigh Park

3 September 2005

(BP) Macclesfield	33 - 13	Hull Ionians
	Report

Priory Park
Attendance: 302
Referee: Adrian Hartwell

=== Round 2 ===
10 September 2005

Bradford & Bingley	24 - 11	Blaydon
	Report

Wagon Lane
Attendance: 230
Referee: Matthew Daubney

10 September 2005

(BP) Cleckheaton	10 - 17	Leicester Lions
	Report

Cleckheaton Sports Club
Attendance: 650
Referee: Rob Sheard

10 September 2005

(BP) Darlington	53 - 18	Macclesfield
	Report

Blackwell Meadows
Attendance: 150
Referee: Des Headington

10 September 2005

(BP) Hull Ionians	42 - 21	Kendal
	Report

Brantingham Park
Attendance: 500
Referee: Rhys Davies

10 September 2005

(BP) Nuneaton	28 - 20	New Brighton
	Report

Liberty Way
Attendance: 150
Referee: Chris Seeley

10 September 2005

(BP) Preston Grasshoppers	47 - 13	Fylde
	Report

Lightfoot Green
Referee: Adrian Hartwell

10 September 2005

(BP) Tynedale	14 - 16	Darlington Mowden Park
	Report

Tynedale Park
Attendance: 220
Referee: Ian Robinson

=== Round 10 (rescheduled game) ===
17 September 2005

(BP) Macclesfield	11 - 17	Leicester Lions
	Report

Priory Park
Referee: Trevor Fisher

- Game brought forward from 26 November 2005.

=== Round 3 ===
24 September 2005

(BP) Blaydon	74 - 10	Cleckheaton
	Report

Crow Trees
Attendance: 200
Referee: Des Headington

24 September 2005

(BP) Darlington Mowden Park	18 - 25	Bradford & Bingley
	Report

Yiewsley Drive
Attendance: 210
Referee: Andrew Gardner

24 September 2005

Fylde	10 - 46	Tynedale (BP)
	Report

Woodlands Memorial Ground
Attendance: 320
Referee: Guy Steel Bodger

24 September 2005

Kendal	16 - 46	Darlington (BP)
	Report

Mint Bridge
Attendance: 250
Referee: Mick Reid

24 September 2005

Leicester Lions	9 - 29	Nuneaton
	Report

Westleigh Park
Attendance: 250
Referee: Ed Turnill

24 September 2005

(BP) Macclesfield	36 - 36	Preston Grasshoppers (BP)
	Report

Priory Park
Attendance: 347
Referee: Chris Seeley

24 September 2005

New Brighton	18 - 15	Hull Ionians (BP)
	Report

Hartsfield
Attendance: 350
Referee: Ian Robinson

=== Round 4 ===
8 October 2005

(BP) Blaydon	34 - 12	Leicester Lions
	Report

Crow Trees
Referee: Brendan Fitzmaurice

8 October 2005

Bradford & Bingley	36 - 22	Fylde
	Report

Wagon Lane
Attendance: 230
Referee: Des Headington

8 October 2005

(BP) Cleckheaton	29 - 5	Darlington Mowden Park
	Report

Cleckheaton Sports Club
Referee: D Edmunds

8 October 2005

(BP) Darlington	20 - 15	New Brighton (BP)
	Report

Blackwell Meadows
Attendance: 125
Referee: Matthew Daubney

8 October 2005

Hull Ionians	10 - 19	Nuneaton
	Report

Brantingham Park
Attendance: 200
Referee: Rhys Davies

8 October 2005

(BP) Preston Grasshoppers	43 - 10	Kendal
	Report

Lightfoot Green
Attendance: 495
Referee: Ian Robinson

8 October 2005

Tynedale	22 - 7	Macclesfield
	Report

Tynedale Park
Attendance: 210
Referee: Mick Reid

=== Round 5 ===
22 October 2005

Darlington Mowden Park	6 - 15	Blaydon
	Report

Yiewsley Drive
Referee: Matthew Daubney

22 October 2005

Fylde	26 - 3	Cleckheaton
	Report

Woodlands Memorial Ground
Attendance: 370
Referee: Mick Reid

22 October 2005

Kendal	15 - 23	Tynedale
	Report

Mint Bridge
Attendance: 350
Referee: Rob Sheard

22 October 2005

Leicester Lions	24 - 17	Hull Ionians (BP)
	Report

Westleigh Park
Attendance: 75
Referee: Des Headington

22 October 2005

Macclesfield	25 - 3	Bradford & Bingley
	Report

Priory Park
Attendance: 273
Referee: Guy Steel Bodger

22 October 2005

New Brighton	7 - 68	Preston Grasshoppers (BP)
	Report

Hartsfield
Attendance: 400
Referee: Adrian Hartwell

22 October 2005

(BP) Nuneaton	41 - 10	Darlington
	Report

Liberty Way
Attendance: 150
Referee: Paul Kimber

=== Round 6 ===
29 October 2005

Blaydon	27 - 13	Fylde
	Report

Crow Trees
Attendance: 180
Referee: Andrew Gardner

29 October 2005

(BP) Bradford & Bingley	59 - 12	Kendal
	Report

Wagon Lane
Attendance: 250
Referee: Adrian Hartwell

29 October 2005

Cleckheaton	10 - 0	Macclesfield
	Report

Cleckheaton Sports Club
Attendance: 350
Referee: Guy Steel Bodger

29 October 2005

(BP) Darlington	29 - 23	Hull Ionians (BP)
	Report

Blackwell Meadows
Attendance: 125
Referee: Mick Reid

29 October 2005

(BP) Darlington Mowden Park	36 - 10	Leicester Lions
	Report

Yiewsley Drive
Attendance: 98
Referee: Rob Sheard

29 October 2005

Preston Grasshoppers	13 - 13	Nuneaton
	Report

Lightfoot Green
Referee: Ian Robinson

29 October 2005

(BP) Tynedale	61 - 5	New Brighton
	Report

Tynedale Park
Attendance: 310
Referee: Matthew Daubney

=== Round 7 ===
5 November 2005

Hull Ionians	27 - 21	Preston Grasshoppers (BP)
	Report

Brantingham Park
Referee: Brendan Fitzmaurice

5 November 2005

(BP) Leicester Lions	27 - 27	Darlington (BP)
	Report

Westleigh Park
Attendance: 80
Referee: Andrew Gardner

5 November 2005

Nuneaton	26 - 21	Tynedale (BP)
	Report

Liberty Way
Referee: Ed Turnill

5 November 2005

Fylde	P - P	Darlington Mowden Park

- Postponed. Game rescheduled to 4 February 2006.

5 November 2005

Kendal	P - P	Cleckheaton

- Postponed. Game rescheduled to 4 February 2006.

5 November 2005

Macclesfield	P - P	Blaydon

- Postponed. Game rescheduled to 4 February 2006.

5 November 2005

New Brighton	P - P	Bradford & Bingley

- Postponed. Game rescheduled to 4 February 2006.

=== Round 8 ===
12 November 2005

(BP) Blaydon	45 - 7	Kendal
	Report

Crow Trees
Referee: Mick Reid

12 November 2005

(BP) Cleckheaton	37 - 18	New Brighton
	Report

Cleckheaton Sports Club
Attendance: 300
Referee: Ian Robinson

12 November 2005

Darlington Mowden Park	28 - 12	Macclesfield
	Report

Yiewsley Drive
Attendance: 175
Referee: Philip Davis

12 November 2005

Fylde	30 - 10	Leicester Lions
	Report

Woodlands Memorial Ground
Attendance: 375
Referee: Adrian Hartwell

12 November 2005

Preston Grasshoppers	23 - 22	Darlington (2BP)
	Report

Lightfoot Green
Referee: Eric Woodmason

12 November 2005

(BP) Tynedale	27 - 14	Hull Ionians
	Report

Tynedale Park
Attendance: 210
Referee: Rob Sheard

12 November 2005

Bradford & Bingley	P - P	Nuneaton

- Postponed. Game rescheduled to 29 April 2006.

=== Round 9 ===
19 November 2005

(BP) Darlington	30 - 16	Tynedale
	Report

Blackwell Meadows
Attendance: 125
Referee: Des Headington

19 November 2005

(BP) Hull Ionians	17 - 24	Bradford & Bingley
	Report

Brantingham Park
Referee: Matthew Daubney

19 November 2005

(2BP) Leicester Lions	34 - 35	Preston Grasshoppers (BP)
	Report

Westleigh Park
Attendance: 75
Referee: Mark Liddell

19 November 2005

New Brighton	9 - 41	Blaydon (BP)
	Report

Hartsfield
Attendance: 150
Referee: Jason Brian

19 November 2005

Nuneaton	6 - 0	Cleckheaton (BP)
	Report

Liberty Way

19 November 2005

Kendal	P - P	Darlington Mowden Park

- Postponed. Game rescheduled to 11 March 2006.

19 November 2005

Macclesfield	P - P	Fylde

- Postponed. Game rescheduled to 11 March 2006.

=== Round 10 ===
26 November 2005

(BP) Bradford & Bingley	52 - 22	Darlington (BP)
	Report

Wagon Lane
Referee: Rob Sheard

26 November 2005

(BP) Cleckheaton	20 - 26	Hull Ionians
	Report

Cleckheaton Sports Club
Attendance: 300
Referee: Chris Seeley

26 November 2005

(BP) Darlington Mowden Park	39 - 13	New Brighton
	Report

Yiewsley Drive
Attendance: 87
Referee: Andrew Gardner

26 November 2005

(BP) Fylde	26 - 3	Kendal
	Report

Woodlands Memorial Ground
Attendance: 250
Referee: Matthew Daubney

26 November 2005

Tynedale	20 - 17	Preston Grasshoppers (BP)
	Report

Tynedale Park
Attendance: 210
Referee: Brendan Fitzmaurice

26 November 2005

Blaydon	P - P	Nuneaton

- Postponed. Game rescheduled to 15 April 2006.

26 November 2005

Macclesfield	P - P	Leicester Lions

- Game brought forward to 17 September 2005.

=== Round 11 ===
3 December 2005

(BP) Darlington	33 - 3	Cleckheaton
	Report

Blackwell Meadows
Attendance: 150
Referee: Matthew Daubney

3 December 2005

Hull Ionians	28 - 16	Blaydon
	Report

Brantingham Park
Referee: Andrew Gardner

3 December 2005

Kendal	3 - 40	Macclesfield (BP)
	Report

Mint Bridge
Attendance: 200
Referee: Darren Gamage

3 December 2005

(BP) Leicester Lions	19 - 23	Tynedale
	Report

Westleigh Park
Attendance: 60

3 December 2005

New Brighton	8 - 27	Fylde
	Report

Hartsfield
Attendance: 250
Referee: Revis Phillips

3 December 2005

(BP) Nuneaton	32 - 5	Darlington Mowden Park
	Report

Liberty Way
Attendance: 100
Referee: Ian Robinson

3 December 2005

(BP) Preston Grasshoppers	34 - 55	Bradford & Bingley (BP)
	Report

Lightfoot Green
Attendance: 574
Referee: Eric Woodmason

=== Round 12 ===
10 December 2005

(BP) Blaydon	50 - 8	Darlington
	Report

Crow Trees
Attendance: 210
Referee: Rob Sheard

10 December 2005

(BP) Bradford & Bingley	38 - 29	Tynedale (BP)
	Report

Wagon Lane
Attendance: 280
Referee: Matthew Daubney

10 December 2005

(BP) Cleckheaton	13 - 19	Preston Grasshoppers
	Report

Cleckheaton Sports Club
Attendance: 350
Referee: David Sainsbury

10 December 2005

Darlington Mowden Park	5 - 35	Hull Ionians (BP)
	Report

Yiewsley Drive
Attendance: 95
Referee: Mick Reid

10 December 2005

Fylde	19 - 29	Nuneaton
	Report

Woodlands Memorial Ground
Attendance: 425
Referee: Guy Steel Bodger

10 December 2005

Kendal	16 - 38	Leicester Lions (BP)
	Report

Mint Bridge
Attendance: 150
Referee: Andrew Gardner

10 December 2005

Macclesfield	21 - 13	New Brighton
	Report

Priory Park
Attendance: 287
Referee: Ed Turnill

=== Round 13 ===
17 December 2005

(BP) Darlington	9 - 16	Darlington Mowden Park
	Report

Blackwell Meadows
Attendance: 550
Referee: Brendan Fitzmaurice

17 December 2005

Hull Ionians	25 - 24	Fylde (BP)
	Report

Brantingham Park
Referee: Andrew Taylorson

17 December 2005

Leicester Lions	0 - 57	Bradford & Bingley (BP)
	Report

Westleigh Park
Attendance: 80
Referee: Mark Varnon

17 December 2005

New Brighton	17 - 7	Kendal
	Report

Hartsfield
Referee: Philip Davis

17 December 2005

(BP) Nuneaton	43 - 33	Macclesfield (BP)
	Report

Liberty Way
Attendance: 250
Referee: G O'Hara

17 December 2005

Preston Grasshoppers	20 - 12	Blaydon
	Report

Lightfoot Green
Attendance: 402
Referee: Guy Steel Bodger

17 December 2005

Tynedale	P - P	Cleckheaton

- Postponed. Game rescheduled to 11 March 2006.

=== Round 14 ===
7 January 2006

(BP) Blaydon	20 - 21	Bradford & Bingley
	Report

Crow Trees
Attendance: 200
Referee: Brendan Fitzmaurice

7 January 2006

(BP) Darlington Mowden Park	7 - 11	Tynedale
	Report

Yiewsley Drive
Attendance: 100
Referee: Chris Seeley

7 January 2006

Fylde	12 - 3	Preston Grasshoppers
	Report

Woodlands Memorial Ground
Attendance: 1,575
Referee: Andrew Gardner

7 January 2006

Kendal	5 - 23	Hull Ionians
	Report

Mint Bridge
Attendance: 260
Referee: Ian Robinson

7 January 2006

(2BP) Leicester Lions	25 - 26	Cleckheaton
	Report

Westleigh Park
Attendance: 50
Referee: Matthew Daubney

7 January 2006

Macclesfield	16 - 14	Darlington (BP)
	Report

Priory Park
Attendance: 247
Referee: Des Headington

7 January 2006

New Brighton	10 - 34	Nuneaton (BP)
	Report

Hartsfield
Attendance: 237
Referee: Trevor Fisher

=== Round 15 ===
14 January 2006

(BP) Bradford & Bingley	38 - 10	Darlington Mowden Park
	Report

Wagon Lane
Attendance: 250
Referee: Ian Robinson

14 January 2006

(BP) Cleckheaton	19 - 21	Blaydon
	Report

Cleckheaton Sports Club
Attendance: 350
Referee: Rob Sheard

14 January 2006

(BP) Darlington	36 - 5	Kendal
	Report

Blackwell Meadows
Attendance: 150
Referee: Matthew Daubney

14 January 2006

(BP) Hull Ionians	36 - 13	New Brighton
	Report

Brantingham Park
Attendance: 400
Referee: Rhys Davies

14 January 2006

Nuneaton	33 - 22	Leicester Lions
	Report

Liberty Way
Attendance: 125
Referee: Eric Woodmason

14 January 2006

Preston Grasshoppers	24 - 10	Macclesfield
	Report

Lightfoot Green
Referee: Mick Reid

14 January 2006

Tynedale	16 - 8	Fylde
	Report

Tynedale Park
Attendance: 290
Referee: Llyr Apgeraint-Roberts

=== Round 16 ===
21 January 2006

Darlington Mowden Park	5 - 31	Cleckheaton (BP)
	Report

Yiewsley Drive
Attendance: 100
Referee: Rhys Davies

21 January 2006

(BP) Fylde	29 - 10	Bradford & Bingley
	Report

Woodlands Memorial Ground
Attendance: 425
Referee: D Edmunds

21 January 2006

Kendal	9 - 29	Preston Grasshoppers (BP)
	Report

Mint Bridge
Attendance: 320
Referee: Brendan Fitzmaurice

21 January 2006

Leicester Lions	10 - 48	Blaydon (BP)
	Report

Westleigh Park
Attendance: 125
Referee: Andrew Taylorson

21 January 2006

(BP) Macclesfield	21 - 22	Tynedale
	Report

Priory Park
Attendance: 247
Referee: Mark Liddell

21 January 2006

New Brighton	15 - 34	Darlington (BP)
	Report

Hartsfield
Referee: Mick Reid

21 January 2006

(BP) Nuneaton	32 - 27	Hull Ionians (BP)
	Report

Liberty Way
Attendance: 135
Referee: Ian Robinson

=== Round 17 ===
28 January 2006

(BP) Blaydon	27 - 10	Darlington Mowden Park
	Report

Crow Trees
Attendance: 210
Referee: Chris Seeley

28 January 2006

Bradford & Bingley	27 - 10	Macclesfield
	Report

Wagon Lane
Attendance: 210
Referee: Ian Robinson

28 January 2006

(BP) Cleckheaton	18 - 25	Fylde
	Report

Cleckheaton Sports Club
Attendance: 320
Referee: Des Headington

28 January 2006

(BP) Darlington	10 - 16	Nuneaton
	Report

Blackwell Meadows
Attendance: 150
Referee: Rob Sheard

28 January 2006

Hull Ionians	15 - 13	Leicester Lions (BP)
	Report

Brantingham Park
Attendance: 300
Referee: Mark Wilson

28 January 2006

(BP) Preston Grasshoppers	74 - 17	New Brighton
	Report

Lightfoot Green
Attendance: 351
Referee: Matthew Daubney

28 January 2006

(BP) Tynedale	25 - 3	Kendal
	Report

Tynedale Park
Attendance: 190
Referee: Mick Reid

=== Round 7 (rescheduled games) ===
4 February 2006

(BP) Fylde	39 - 3	Darlington Mowden Park
	Report

Woodlands Memorial Ground
Attendance: 250
Referee: Darren Gamage

- Game rescheduled from 5 November 2005.

4 February 2006

Kendal	12 - 43	Cleckheaton (BP)
	Report

Mint Bridge
Attendance: 200
Referee: D Edmunds

- Game rescheduled from 5 November 2005.

4 February 2006

(BP) Macclesfield	13 - 19	Blaydon
	Report

Priory Park
Attendance: 147
Referee: Andrew Taylorson

- Game rescheduled from 5 November 2005.

4 February 2006

New Brighton	21 - 52	Bradford & Bingley (BP)
	Report

Hartsfield
Referee: Chris Sharp

- Game rescheduled from 5 November 2005.

=== Round 18 ===
11 February 2006

Fylde	13 - 51	Blaydon (BP)
	Report

Woodlands Memorial Ground
Attendance: 325
Referee: Andrew Gardner

11 February 2006

(BP) Hull Ionians	23 - 28	Darlington
	Report

Brantingham Park
Attendance: 300
Referee: Des Headington

11 February 2006

Kendal	7 - 45	Bradford & Bingley (BP)
	Report

Mint Bridge
Referee: Chris Seeley

11 February 2006

Leicester Lions	25 - 15	Darlington Mowden Park
	Report

Westleigh Park
Attendance: 125
Referee: Trevor Fisher

11 February 2006

New Brighton	16 - 48	Tynedale (BP)
	Report

Hartsfield
Referee: Steve Lander

11 February 2006

(BP) Nuneaton	55 - 24	Preston Grasshoppers (BP)
	Report

Liberty Way
Attendance: 300
Referee: D Edmunds

11 February 2006

Macclesfield	P - P	Cleckheaton

- Postponed. Game rescheduled to 29 April 2006.

=== Round 19 ===
18 February 2006

(BP) Blaydon	33 - 11	Macclesfield
	Report

Crow Trees
Attendance: 180
Referee: P.W Davies

18 February 2006

(BP) Bradford & Bingley	90 - 21	New Brighton
	Report

Wagon Lane
Attendance: 220
Referee: Andrew Gardner

18 February 2006

(BP) Cleckheaton	31 - 12	Kendal
	Report

Cleckheaton Sports Club
Attendance: 380
Referee: Rhys Davies

18 February 2006

(BP) Darlington	48 - 0	Leicester Lions
	Report

Blackwell Meadows
Attendance: 170
Referee: Revis Phillips

18 February 2006

Darlington Mowden Park	29 - 18	Fylde
	Report

Yiewsley Drive
Attendance: 120
Referee: Matthew Daubney

18 February 2006

(BP) Preston Grasshoppers	40 - 24	Hull Ionians (BP)
	Report

Lightfoot Green
Attendance: 327
Referee: Dino Maddern

18 February 2006

Tynedale	19 - 10	Nuneaton
	Report

Tynedale Park
Attendance: 300
Referee: Brendan Fitzmaurice

=== Round 20 ===
25 February 2006

(BP) Darlington	28 - 17	Preston Grasshoppers
	Report

Blackwell Meadows
Attendance: 150
Referee: Rob Sheard

25 February 2006

Hull Ionians	10 - 8	Tynedale (BP)
	Report

Brantingham Park
Attendance: 300
Referee: Trevor Fisher

25 February 2006

Kendal	12 - 48	Blaydon (BP)
	Report

Mint Bridge
Attendance: 200
Referee: Ian Robinson

25 February 2006

Leicester Lions	10 - 32	Fylde
	Report

Westleigh Park
Attendance: 120

25 February 2006

Macclesfield	27 - 18	Darlington Mowden Park
	Report

Priory Park
Attendance: 213
Referee: R Steggall

25 February 2006

New Brighton	16 - 29	Cleckheaton (BP)
	Report

Hartsfield
Attendance: 200
Referee: Matthew Daubney

25 February 2006

(BP) Nuneaton	14 - 17	Bradford & Bingley
	Report

Liberty Way
Attendance: 500
Referee: Steve Lander

=== Round 21 ===
4 March 2006

(BP) Darlington Mowden Park	37 - 7	Kendal
	Report

Yiewsley Drive
Attendance: 150
Referee: Andrew Gardner

4 March 2006

Fylde	17 - 32	Macclesfield (BP)
	Report

Woodlands Memorial Ground
Referee: D Edmunds

4 March 2006

Blaydon	P - P	New Brighton

- Postponed. Game rescheduled to 11 March 2006.

4 March 2006

Bradford & Bingley	P - P	Hull Ionians

- Postponed. Game rescheduled to 11 March 2006.

4 March 2006

Cleckheaton	C - C	Nuneaton

- Game initially postponed but due to fixture congestion and the fact that the result would not affect the final league table the game would ultimately be cancelled.

4 March 2006

Preston Grasshoppers	P - P	Leicester Lions

- Postponed. Game rescheduled to 11 March 2006.

4 March 2006

Tynedale	P - P	Darlington

- Postponed. Game rescheduled to 15 April 2006.

=== Rounds 9, 13 & 21 (rescheduled games) ===
11 March 2006

(BP) Blaydon	61 - 24	New Brighton (BP)
	Report

Crow Trees
Referee: Andrew Gardner

- Game rescheduled from 4 March 2006.

11 March 2006

(BP) Bradford & Bingley	36 - 13	Hull Ionians
	Report

Wagon Lane
Attendance: 256
Referee: Chris Seeley

- Game rescheduled from 4 March 2006.

11 March 2006

Kendal	5 - 27	Darlington Mowden Park (BP)
	Report

Mint Bridge
Attendance: 150
Referee: Brendan Fitzmaurice

- Game rescheduled from 19 November 2005.

11 March 2006

Macclesfield	13 - 26	Fylde (BP)
	Report

Priory Park
Attendance: 247
Referee: Rhys Davies

- Game rescheduled from 19 November 2005.

11 March 2006

Preston Grasshoppers	13 - 22	Leicester Lions (BP)
	Report

Lightfoot Green
Attendance: 150
Referee: Mick Reid

- Game rescheduled from 4 March 2006.

11 March 2006

Tynedale	14 - 7	Cleckheaton (BP)
	Report

Tynedale Park
Attendance: 100
Referee: Ian Robinson

- Game rescheduled from 17 December 2005.

=== Round 22 ===
18 March 2006

(BP) Hull Ionians	22 - 28	Cleckheaton
	Report

Brantingham Park
Attendance: 400
Referee: D Edmunds

18 March 2006

Kendal	22 - 22	Fylde
	Report

Mint Bridge
Attendance: 170
Referee: Mick Reid

18 March 2006

Leicester Lions	17 - 17	Macclesfield
	Report

Westleigh Park
Referee: Paul Kimber

18 March 2006

New Brighton	10 - 29	Darlington Mowden Park (BP)
	Report

Hartsfield
Referee: Chris Seeley

18 March 2006

Nuneaton	17 - 7	Blaydon
	Report

Liberty Way
Referee: Guy Steel Bodger

18 March 2006

(BP) Preston Grasshoppers	27 - 24	Tynedale (2BP)
	Report

Lightfoot Green
Referee: Rob Sheard

18 March 2006

Darlington	P - P	Bradford & Bingley

- Postponed. Game rescheduled to 6 May 2006.

=== Round 23 ===
25 March 2006

(BP) Blaydon	37 - 5	Hull Ionians
	Report

Crow Trees
Attendance: 225
Referee: Andrew Gardner

25 March 2006

(BP) Bradford & Bingley	32 - 21	Preston Grasshoppers
	Report

Wagon Lane
Attendance: 400
Referee: Matthew Daubney

25 March 2006

(BP) Cleckheaton	24 - 48	Darlington (BP)
	Report

Cleckheaton Sports Club
Attendance: 300
Referee: Jason Brian

25 March 2006

(BP) Darlington Mowden Park	17 - 19	Nuneaton
	Report

Yiewsley Drive
Attendance: 160
Referee: Ian Robinson

25 March 2006

(BP) Macclesfield	37 - 10	Kendal
	Report

Priory Park

25 March 2006

(BP) Tynedale	45 - 15	Leicester Lions
	Report

Tynedale Park
Attendance: 300
Referee: Mick Reid

25 March 2006

Fylde	C - C	New Brighton

- Game initially postponed but due to fixture congestion and the fact that the result would not affect the final league table the game would ultimately be cancelled.

=== Round 24 ===
1 April 2006

(BP) Darlington	11 - 12	Blaydon
	Report

Blackwell Meadows
Attendance: 250
Referee: Ian Robinson

1 April 2006

Hull Ionians	22 - 12	Darlington Mowden Park
	Report

Brantingham Park
Attendance: 300
Referee: Mick Reid

1 April 2006

(BP) Leicester Lions	24 - 21	Kendal (BP)
	Report

Westleigh Park
Attendance: 100
Referee: Steve Walters

1 April 2006

New Brighton	0 - 48	Macclesfield (BP)
	Report

Hartsfield
Attendance: 270
Referee: Revis Phillips

1 April 2006

(BP) Nuneaton	25 - 10	Fylde
	Report

Liberty Way
Attendance: 300
Referee: G O'Hara

1 April 2006

Tynedale	22 - 22	Bradford & Bingley
	Report

Tynedale Park
Attendance: 210
Referee: Brendan Fitzmaurice

1 April 2006

Preston Grasshoppers	P - P	Cleckheaton

- Postponed. Game rescheduled to 15 April 2006.

=== Round 25 ===
8 April 2006

(BP) Blaydon	22 - 5	Preston Grasshoppers
	Report

Crow Trees
Attendance: 230
Referee: Andrew Vertigan

8 April 2006

(BP) Bradford & Bingley	42 - 0	Leicester Lions
	Report

Wagon Lane
Referee: Mick Reid

8 April 2006

Cleckheaton	19 - 10	Tynedale
	Report

Cleckheaton Sports Club
Attendance: 400
Referee: Ian Robinson

8 April 2006

Darlington Mowden Park	13 - 12	Darlington (BP)
	Report

Yiewsley Drive
Attendance: 280
Referee: D Edmunds

8 April 2006

(BP) Fylde	35 - 35	Hull Ionians (BP)
	Report

Woodlands Memorial Ground
Attendance: 475
Referee: Matthew Daubney

8 April 2006

(BP) Kendal	52 - 0	New Brighton
	Report

Mint Bridge
Attendance: 200
Referee: Andrew Gardner

8 April 2006

(BP) Macclesfield	20 - 26	Nuneaton (BP)
	Report

Priory Park
Attendance: 237
Referee: Martin Fox

=== Rounds 10, 21 & 24 (rescheduled games) ===
15 April 2006

Blaydon	18 - 12	Nuneaton (BP)
	Report

Crow Trees
Attendance: 350
Referee: Mark Wilson

- Game rescheduled from 26 November 2005.

15 April 2006

(BP) Preston Grasshoppers	17 - 22	Cleckheaton
	Report

Lightfoot Green
Attendance: 340
Referee: D Edmunds

- Game rescheduled from 1 April 2006.

15 April 2006

(BP) Tynedale	18 - 25	Darlington (BP)
	Report

Tynedale Park
Attendance: 150
Referee: Brendan Fitzmaurice

- Game rescheduled from 4 March 2006.

=== Round 26 ===
22 April 2006

(BP) Bradford & Bingley	29 - 17	Cleckheaton
	Report

Wagon Lane
Attendance: 265
Referee: Matthew Daubney

22 April 2006

(BP) Darlington	26 - 39	Fylde (BP)
	Report

Blackwell Meadows
Attendance: 380
Referee: Andrew Gardner

22 April 2006

Hull Ionians	18 - 13	Macclesfield (BP)
	Report

Brantingham Park
Attendance: 400
Referee: Des Headington

22 April 2006

(BP) New Brighton	33 - 47	Leicester Lions (BP)
	Report

Hartsfield
Referee: Ian Robinson

22 April 2006

(BP) Nuneaton	74 - 0	Kendal
	Report

Liberty Way
Attendance: 250
Referee: Eric Woodmason

22 April 2006

(BP) Preston Grasshoppers	65 - 38	Darlington Mowden Park
	Report

Lightfoot Green
Attendance: 368
Referee: Mick Reid

22 April 2006

(BP) Tynedale	44 - 13	Blaydon
	Report

Tynedale Park
Attendance: 500
Referee: D Edmunds

=== Rounds 8 & 18 (rescheduled games) ===
29 April 2006

(BP) Bradford & Bingley	36 - 29	Nuneaton (2BP)
	Report

Wagon Lane
Attendance: 750
Referee: Andrew Vertigan

- Game rescheduled from 12 November 2005.

29 April 2006

(BP) Macclesfield	36 - 8	Cleckheaton
	Report

Priory Park
Referee: JP Doyle

- Game rescheduled from 11 February 2006.

=== Round 22 (rescheduled game) ===
6 May 2006

Darlington	22 - 30	Bradford & Bingley
	Report

Blackwell Meadows
Attendance: 150
Referee: Mick Reid

- Game rescheduled from 18 March 2006.

=== Promotion play-off ===
The league runners up of National Division Three South and North would meet in a playoff game for promotion to National Division Two. North Walsham were the southern division runners up and as they had a superior league record than northern runners-up, Nuneaton, they hosted the play-off match.

13 May 2006

North Walsham	5 - 15	Nuneaton
	Report

Norwich Road
Attendance: 1,302
Referee: Nick Williams

== Total season attendances ==
Club	Home Games	Total	Average	Highest	Lowest	% Capacity
Blaydon	9 (Note: Missing home attendances v Tynedale on 3 September 2005, Leicester Lions on 8 October 2005, Kendal on 12 November 2005 and New Brighton on 11 March 2006.)	1,985	221	350	180	11%
Bradford & Bingley	11 (Note: Missing home attendances v Darlington on 26 November 2005 and Leicester Lions on 8 April 2006.)	3,341	304	750	210	8%
Cleckheaton	11 (Note: Only played 12 home games. Missing home attendance v Darlington Mowden Park on 8 October 2005.)	4,500	409	800	300	
Darlington	13	2,625	202	550	125	7%
Darlington Mowden Park	12 (Note: Missing home attendance v Blaydon on 22 October 2005.)	1,785	149	280	87	
Fylde	10 (Note: Only played 12 home games. Missing home attendances v Darlington on 3 September 2005 and Macclesfield on 4 March 2006.)	4,790	479	1,575	250	6%
Hull Ionians	9 (Note: Missing home attendances v Preston Grasshoppers on 5 November 2005, Bradford & Bingley on 19 November 2005, Blaydon on 3 December 2005 and Fylde on 17 December 2005.)	3,100	344	500	200	23%
Kendal	12 (Note: Missing home attendance v Bradford & Bingley on 11 February 2006.)	2,650	221	350	150	5%
Leicester Lions	11 (Note: Missing home attendances v New Brighton on 3 September 2005 and Macclesfield on 18 March 2006.)	1,140	104	250	50	5%
Macclesfield	10 (Note: Missing home attendances v Leicester Lions on 17 September 2005, Kendal on 25 March 2006 and Cleckheaton on 29 April 2006.)	2,547	255	347	147	20%
New Brighton	7 (Note: Missing home attendances v Kendal on 17 December 2005, Darlington on 21 January 2006, Bradford & Bingley on 4 February 2006, Tynedale on 11 February 2006, Darlington Mowden Park on 18 March 2006 and Leicester Lions on 22 April 2006.)	1,857	265	400	150	13%
Nuneaton	10 (Note: Missing home attendances v Tynedale on 5 November 2005, Cleckheaton on 19 November 2005 and Blaydon on 18 March 2006.)	2,260	226	500	100	6%
Preston Grasshoppers	8 (Note: Missing home attendances v Fylde on 10 September 2005, Nuneaton on 29 October 2005, Darlington on 12 November 2005, Macclesfield on 14 January 2006 and Tynedale on 18 March 2006.)	3,007	376	574	150	17%
Tynedale	13	3,200	246	500	100	12%

== Individual statistics ==
- Note that points scorers includes tries as well as conversions, penalties and drop goals.

=== Top points scorers ===
Rank	Player	Team	Appearances	Points
1	(England) Tom Rhodes	Bradford & Bingley	24	270
2	(England) Paul Bailey	Preston Grasshoppers	24	269
3	(England) Mike Scott	Fylde	24	264
4	(Wales) Gareth Cull	Nuneaton	22	259
5	(Wales) Dan Yuill	Leicester Lions	25	174
6	(England) Ross Winney	Macclesfield	22	167
7	(England) Phillip Belgian	Tynedale	19	165
8	(England) Chris Quinn	Cleckheaton	23	162
9	(England) Dan Clappison	Blaydon	19	158
9	(England) Stephen Dean	New Brighton	25	158

=== Top try scorers ===
Rank	Player	Team	Appearances	Tries
1	(England) Alan Brown	Darlington	24	25
2	(England) Phil Read	Nuneaton	25	21
3	(England) Oliver Viney	Preston Grasshoppers	24	20
4	(England) Mark Kirkby	Bradford & Bingley	23	17
5	(England) Nick Royle	Fylde	18	16
6	(England) Lee Parry	Nuneaton	21	14
6	(England) Gareth Collins	Leicester Lions	23	14
6	(England) Joe Simpson	Bradford & Bingley	24	14
6	(England) Derek Eves	Hull Ionians	26	14
7	(South Africa) Barry Jacobsz	Bradford & Bingley	17	13
7	(Tonga) Katilimoni Tuipulotu	New Brighton	20	13
7	(England) Francis Coulson	Darlington	25	13

== Season records ==
=== Team ===
Largest home win — 74 pts

74 - 0 Nuneaton at home to Kendal on 22 April 2006

Largest away win — 61 pts

68 - 7 Preston Grasshoppers away to New Brighton on 22 October 2005

Most points scored — 90 pts

90 - 21 Bradford & Bingley at home to New Brighton on 18 February 2006

Most tries in a match — 14

Bradford & Bingley at home to New Brighton on 18 February 2006

Most conversions in a match — 10

Bradford & Bingley at home to New Brighton on 18 February 2006

Most penalties in a match — 6

Fylde away to Leicester Lions on 25 February 2006

Most drop goals in a match — 3

Fylde at home to Preston Grasshoppers on 7 January 2006

=== Player ===
Most points in a match — 32

(England) Paul Bailey for Preston Grasshoppers at home to Fylde on 10 September 2005

Most tries in a match — 6

(England) Mark Kirkby for Fylde away to Leicester Lions on 25 February 2006

Most conversions in a match — 10

(England) Tom Rhodes for Bradford & Bingley at home to New Brighton on 18 February 2006

Most penalties in a match — 6

(England) Mike Scott for Fylde away to Leicester Lions on 25 February 2006

Most drop goals in a match — 3

(England) Mike Scott for Fylde at home to Preston Grasshoppers on 7 January 2006

=== Attendances ===
Highest — 1,575

Fylde at home to Preston Grasshoppers on 7 January 2006

Lowest — 50

Leicester Lions at home to Cleckheaton on 7 January 2006

Highest Average Attendance — 479

Fylde

Lowest Average Attendance — 104

Leicester Lions

== See also ==
- English Rugby Union Leagues
- English rugby union system
- Rugby union in England
