= 2009–10 National League 1 =

Rugby union competition in England

2009-10 National League 1
- Countries: England
- Champions: Esher
- Runners-up: London Scottish
- Relegated: Manchester, Nuneaton, Newbury Blues
- Attendance: 127,850 (average 539 per match) (Note: Note that 2 home attendances are missing (see below) - so the total attendance will not be 100% accurate. The average attendance has also been taken into account with the missing games not included.)
- Highest attendance: 2,485 London Scottish at home to Esher on 16 January 2010
- Lowest attendance: 105 Blaydon at home to Nuneaton on 17 April 2010
- Top point scorer: (England) Sam Ulph; Esher 399 points
- Top try scorer: (South Africa) Johannes Schmidt; Cambridge 30 tries

The 2009-10 National League 1, previously known as National Division 2, is the first season of the third division of the English rugby union competitions since the professionalised format of the second division was introduced with widespread league changes made by the RFU. As the new second division would reduce teams from 16 to 12, there were plenty of new additions to National League 1, itself increasing from 14 to 16 teams, with Esher, Newbury, Manchester, Manchester and Sedgley Park all dropping down from the old National 1 while Nuneaton and London Scottish came up from the 2008–09 National Division Three North and 2008–09 National Division Three South respectively (these divisions themselves now renamed National League 2 North/South).

At the end of the season Esher finished as champions, way ahead of runners up and newly promoted London Scottish, suffering only one defeat and going straight back up to the 2010–11 RFU Championship. At the other end of the table, Manchester had an absolutely awful season, suffering their second successive relegation, with no wins, no bonus points, only 114 points scored and over 2,500 points conceded. The other two sides to join them would be Nuneaton who went straight back down after one season and Newbury Blues who also suffered a second relegation in a row, losing out to 13th place Otley by just 2 points. Manchester and Nuneaton would drop to the 2010–11 National League 2 North while Newbury would go down into the 2010–11 National League 2 South.

== Participating teams and locations ==
Locations of the 2009-10 National League 1 teams

Team	Stadium	Capacity	City/Area
Blackheath	Rectory Field	3,500 (500 seats)	Blackheath, London
Blaydon	Crow Trees	2,000 (400 seats)	Swalwell, Tyne and Wear
Cambridge	Grantchester Road	2,200 (200 seats)	Cambridge, Cambridgeshire
Cinderford	Dockham Road	2,500	Cinderford, Gloucestershire
Esher	Molesey Road	3,000 (1,200 seats)	Hersham, Surrey
Launceston	Polson Bridge	3,000	Launceston, Cornwall
London Scottish	Athletic Ground	4,500 (1,000 seats)	Richmond, London
Manchester	Grove Park	4,000	Cheadle Hulme, Greater Manchester
Newbury Blues	Monk's Lane	8,000	Newbury, Berkshire
Nuneaton	Liberty Way	3,800 (500 seats)	Nuneaton, Warwickshire
Otley	Cross Green	7,000 (852 seats)	Otley, West Yorkshire
Redruth	The Recreation Ground	3,500 (580 seats)	Redruth, Cornwall
Sedgley Park	Park Lane	3,000	Whitefield, Greater Manchester
Stourbridge	Stourton Park	3,500 (499 seats)	Stourbridge, West Midlands
Tynedale	Tynedale Park	2,000 (400 seats)	Corbridge, Northumberland
Wharfedale	The Avenue	2,000	Threshfield, Craven, North Yorkshire

== League table ==
2009–10 National League 1 table
Pos	Team	Pld	W	D	L	PF	PA	PD	TB	LB	Pts	Qualification
1	Esher (Note: Esher would only play 29 games as their final game away to Cinderford was cancelled.) (C)	29	28	0	1	1416	338	+1078	22	1	135	Promoted
2	London Scottish	30	22	1	7	938	569	+369	15	3	108	
3	Launceston	30	21	0	9	848	606	+242	17	4	105	
4	Cambridge	30	19	1	10	880	572	+308	14	5	97	
5	Tynedale	30	18	1	11	1008	629	+379	17	5	96	
6	Wharfedale	30	18	0	12	857	666	+191	14	5	91	
7	Blaydon	30	16	0	14	924	679	+245	12	4	80	
8	Blackheath	30	14	1	15	760	730	+30	10	5	73	
9	Sedgley Park	30	13	0	17	827	807	+20	11	8	71	
10	Stourbridge	30	13	0	17	751	799	−48	12	6	70	
11	Redruth	30	12	1	17	675	575	+100	10	9	69	
12	Cinderford (Note: Cinderford would only play 29 games as their final game at home to Esher was cancelled.)	29	12	0	17	753	636	+117	10	8	66	
13	Otley	30	12	1	17	710	811	−101	9	4	63	
14	Newbury (R)	30	12	0	18	671	745	−74	6	7	61	Relegated
15	Nuneaton (R)	30	6	0	24	559	903	−344	4	4	32	Relegated
16	Manchester (R)	30	0	0	30	114	2626	−2512	0	0	0	Relegated

Updated to match(es) played on 8 May 2010. Source: "National One 9/10 League table". Rugby Statbunker.
Rules for classification: If teams are level at any stage, tiebreakers are applied in the following order:
1. Number of matches won
2. Difference between points for and against
3. Total number of points for
4. Aggregate number of points scored in matches between tied teams
5. Number of matches won excluding the first match, then the second and so on until the tie is settled
  (C) Champion; (R) Relegated
  Notes:

== Results ==
=== Round 1 ===
5 September 2009
15:00

(BP) Blaydon	29 - 11	Otley
	Report

Crow Trees
Attendance: 740
Referee: Michael Tutty

5 September 2009

Cinderford	19 - 32	Launceston (BP)
	Report

Dockham Road
Attendance: 400
Referee: Rowan Kitt

5 September 2009

(BP) London Scottish	36 - 15	Sedgley Park
	Report

Richmond Athletic Ground
Attendance: 935
Referee: Terry Hall

5 September 2009

Manchester	0 - 148	Esher (BP)
	Report

Grove Park
Attendance: 221
Referee: Andrew Taylorson

5 September 2009

(BP) Newbury Blues	22 - 24	Tynedale
	Report

Monk's Lane
Attendance: 485
Referee: Richard Kelly

5 September 2009
15:00

Redruth	13 - 13	Cambridge
	Report

The Recreation Ground
Attendance: 1,026
Referee: Paul Knowles

5 September 2009

Stourbridge	29 - 10	Blackheath
	Report

Stourton Park
Attendance: 450
Referee: Steve Lee

5 September 2009

Wharfedale	20 - 6	Nuneaton
	Report

The Avenue
Attendance: 538
Referee: P.W Davies

=== Round 2 ===
12 September 2009

Blackheath	20 - 30	Newbury Blues (BP)
	Report

Rectory Field
Attendance: 542
Referee: Philip Davis

12 September 2009

(BP) Blaydon	19 - 23	Wharfedale
	Report

Crow Trees
Attendance: 348
Referee: John Meredith

12 September 2009

(BP) Cambridge	38 - 26	London Scottish
	Report

Grantchester Road
Attendance: 1,020
Referee: Adrian Hartwell

12 September 2009

(BP) Esher	62 - 15	Cinderford
	Report

Molesey Road
Attendance: 925
Referee: Marcus Canton

12 September 2009
15:00

(BP) Launceston	32 - 26	Redruth
	Report

Polson Bridge
Attendance: 1,437
Referee: Richard Kelly

12 September 2009

(BP) Nuneaton	95 - 0	Manchester
	Report

Liberty Way
Attendance: 325
Referee: Trevor Fisher

12 September 2009
15:00

Otley	23 - 23	Tynedale
	Report

Cross Green
Attendance: 459
Referee: Mark Wilson

12 September 2009

(BP) Sedgley Park	35 - 15	Stourbridge
	Report

Park Lane
Referee: Paul Knowles

=== Round 3 ===
19 September 2009

Cinderford	26 - 34	Nuneaton (BP)
	Report

Dockham Road
Attendance: 300
Referee: Luke Pearce

19 September 2009

(BP) London Scottish	42 - 13	Launceston
	Report

Richmond Athletic Ground
Attendance: 1,045
Referee: Darren Gamage

19 September 2009

Manchester	12 - 145	Blaydon (BP)
	Report

Grove Park
Attendance: 207
Referee: Rob Sheard

19 September 2009

Newbury Blues	24 - 11	Sedgley Park
	Report

Monk's Lane
Attendance: 371
Referee: Ross Campbell

19 September 2009
15:00

(BP) Redruth	17 - 23	Esher
	Report

The Recreation Ground
Attendance: 1,123
Referee: Michael Tutty

19 September 2009

Stourbridge	21 - 45	Cambridge (BP)
	Report

Stourton Park
Attendance: 450
Referee: Richard Kelly

19 September 2009

(BP) Tynedale	48 - 24	Blackheath (BP)
	Report

Tynedale Park
Attendance: 630
Referee: Andrew Vertigan

19 September 2009
15:00

Wharfedale	22 - 9	Otley
	Report

The Avenue
Attendance: 868
Referee: Llyr Apgeraint-Roberts

=== Round 4 ===
26 September 2009

(BP) Blaydon	36 - 24	Cinderford (BP)
	Report

Crow Trees
Attendance: 260
Referee: Chris Sharp

26 September 2009

Cambridge	16 - 13	Newbury (BP)
	Report

Grantchester Road
Attendance: 456
Referee: Andrew Vertigan

26 September 2009

Esher	23 - 17	London Scottish (BP)
	Report

Molesey Road
Attendance: 1,294
Referee: Luke Pearce

26 September 2009

(BP) Launceston	35 - 29	Stourbridge (2BP)
	Report

Polson Bridge
Attendance: 668
Referee: Keith Lewis

26 September 2009
15:00

Nuneaton	22 - 35	Redruth (BP)
	Report

Liberty Way
Attendance: 310
Referee: Steve Lee

26 September 2009
15:00

Otley	17 - 13	Blackheath (BP)
	Report

Cross Green
Attendance: 376
Referee: Ian Tempest

26 September 2009

Sedgley Park	23 - 22	Tynedale (BP)
	Report

Park Lane
Attendance: 499
Referee: John Meredith

26 September 2009

(BP) Wharfedale	124 - 5	Manchester
	Report

The Avenue
Attendance: 429
Referee: Matthew Daubney

=== Round 5 ===
3 October 2009

(BP) Blackheath	35 - 29	Sedgley Park (2BP)
	Report

Rectory Field
Attendance: 696
Referee: Darren Gamage

3 October 2009

(2BP) Cinderford	26 - 28	Wharfedale
	Report

Dockham Road
Attendance: 250
Referee: Ian Tempest

3 October 2009

London Scottish	22 - 7	Nuneaton
	Report

Richmond Athletic Ground
Attendance: 500
Referee: Marcus Caton

3 October 2009
15:00

Manchester	3 - 93	Otley (BP)
	Report

Grove Park
Attendance: 290
Referee: Brendan Fitzmaurice

3 October 2009

(BP) Newbury Blues	23 - 25	Launceston
	Report

Monk's Lane
Attendance: 459
Referee: Michael Tutty

3 October 2009
15:00

(BP) Redruth	30 - 12	Blaydon
	Report

The Recreation Ground
Attendance: 958
Referee: John Meredith

3 October 2009

Stourbridge	17 - 48	Esher (BP)
	Report

Stourton Park
Attendance: 450
Referee: Terry Hall

3 October 2009

Tynedale	21 - 20	Cambridge (BP)
	Report

Tynedale Park
Attendance: 486
Referee: Steve Lee

=== Round 6 ===
10 October 2009

Blaydon	11 - 29	London Scottish (BP)
	Report

Crow Trees
Attendance: 432
Referee: Andrew McMenemy

10 October 2009

(BP) Cambridge	68 - 14	Blackheath
	Report

Grantchester Road
Attendance: 589
Referee: Richard Kelly

10 October 2009

(BP) Esher	56 - 5	Newbury Blues
	Report

Molesey Road
Attendance: 786
Referee: Ashley Rowden

10 October 2009

Launceston	23 - 17	Tynedale (BP)
	Report

Polson Bridge
Attendance: 668
Referee: P.W Davies

10 October 2009

Manchester	3 - 93	Cinderford (BP)
	Report

Grove Park
Attendance: 140
Referee: Simon McConnell

10 October 2009

(BP) Nuneaton	17 - 18	Stourbridge
	Report

Liberty Way
Attendance: 277
Referee: Andrew Vertigan

10 October 2009
15:00

Otley	36 - 29	Sedgley Park (2BP)
	Report

Cross Green
Attendance: 374
Referee: Mark Wilson

10 October 2009
14:30

Wharfedale	28 - 21	Redruth (BP)
	Report

The Avenue
Attendance: 587
Referee: Andrew Taylorson

=== Round 7 ===
17 October 2009

Blackheath	20 - 19	Launceston (BP)
	Report

Rectory Field
Attendance: 836
Referee: Llyr Apgeraint-Roberts

17 October 2009
15:00

(BP) Cinderford	26 - 3	Otley
	Report

Dockham Road
Attendance: 225
Referee: Paul Knowles

17 October 2009

(BP) London Scottish	37 - 16	Wharfedale
	Report

Richmond Athletic Ground
Attendance: 700
Referee: John Meredith

17 October 2009

(BP) Newbury Blues	33 - 22	Nuneaton
	Report

Monk's Lane
Attendance: 411
Referee: Richard Kelly

17 October 2009
15:00

(BP) Redruth	91 - 5	Manchester
	Report

The Recreation Ground
Attendance: 963
Referee: Andrew Bickle

17 October 2009

(BP) Stourbridge	38 - 5	Blaydon
	Report

Stourton Park
Attendance: 450
Referee: Ross Campbell

17 October 2009

Sedgley Park	24 - 43	Cambridge (BP)
	Report

Park Lane
Attendance: 479
Referee: Andrew Vertigan

17 October 2009

(BP) Tynedale	27 - 42	Esher (BP)
	Report

Tynedale Park
Attendance: 636
Referee: Mark Wilson

=== Round 8 ===
24 October 2009

Blaydon	21 - 17	Newbury Blues (BP)
	Report

Crow Trees
Attendance: 240
Referee: Llyr Apgeraint-Roberts

24 October 2009
15:00

Cinderford	23 - 15	Redruth
	Report

Dockham Road
Attendance: 215
Referee: Ross Campbell

24 October 2009

(BP) Esher	39 - 18	Blackheath
	Report

Molesey Road
Attendance: 1,263
Referee: Rowan Kitt

24 October 2009

(BP) Launceston	14 - 20	Sedgley Park
	Report

Polson Bridge
Attendance: 704
Referee: Ed Turnill

24 October 2009

Manchester	0 - 93	London Scottish (BP)
	Report

Grove Park
Attendance: 286
Referee: Mick Reid

24 October 2009

Nuneaton	21 - 20	Tynedale (BP)
	Report

Liberty Way
Attendance: 190
Referee: John Meredith

24 October 2009
15:00

Otley	17 - 12	Cambridge (BP)
	Report

Cross Green
Attendance: 487
Referee: P.W Davies

24 October 2009

(BP) Wharfedale	31 - 16	Stourbridge
	Report

The Avenue
Attendance: 508
Referee: Ian Tempest

=== Round 9 ===
31 October 2009

(BP) Blackheath	37 - 17	Nuneaton
	Report

Rectory Field
Attendance: 722
Referee: Adrian Hartwell

31 October 2009

Cambridge	22 - 8	Launceston
	Report

Grantchester Road
Attendance: 632
Referee: Keith Lewis

31 October 2009

London Scottish	26 - 18	Cinderford
	Report

Richmond Athletic Ground
Attendance: 954
Referee: Ian Tempest

31 October 2009

Newbury Blues	21 - 17	Wharfedale (BP)
	Report

Monk's Lane
Attendance: 510
Referee: Marcus Caton

31 October 2009
15:00

Redruth	11 - 10	Otley (BP)
	Report

The Recreation Ground
Attendance: 824
Referee: Michael Tutty

31 October 2009

Sedgley Park	21 - 20	Esher (BP)
	Report

Park Lane
Attendance: 512
Referee: Steve Lee

31 October 2009

(BP) Stourbridge	95 - 0	Manchester
	Report

Stourton Park
Attendance: 600
Referee: Paul Kimber

31 October 2009

(BP) Tynedale	22 - 28	Blaydon (BP)
	Report

Tynedale Park
Attendance: 910
Referee: Chris Sharp

=== Round 10 ===
7 November 2009

Blaydon	22 - 6	Blackheath
	Report

Crow Trees
Attendance: 263
Referee: Marcus Caton

7 November 2009

(BP) Cinderford	21 - 25	Stourbridge
	Report

Dockham Road
Attendance: 265
Referee: Darren Gamage

7 November 2009

Esher	28 - 7	Cambridge
	Report

Molesey Road
Attendance: 872
Referee: Adrian Hartwell

7 November 2009

Manchester	0 - 59	Newbury Blues (BP)
	Report

Grove Park
Attendance: 175
Referee: Mark Liddell

7 November 2009

Nuneaton	24 - 33	Sedgley Park (BP)
	Report

Liberty Way
Attendance: 171
Referee: Luke Pearce

7 November 2009
14:15

(2BP) Otley	29 - 33	Launceston
	Report

Cross Green
Attendance: 347
Referee: Mark Wilson

7 November 2009
14:30

(BP) Redruth	10 - 11	London Scottish
	Report

The Recreation Ground
Attendance: 913
Referee: Richard Kelly

7 November 2009

(BP) Wharfedale	15 - 21	Tynedale
	Report

The Avenue
Attendance: 467
Referee: Ross Campbell

=== Round 11 ===
14 November 2009

Blackheath	20 - 15	Wharfedale (BP)
	Report

Rectory Field
Attendance: 410
Referee: Simon McConnell

14 November 2009

(BP) Cambridge	26 - 6	Nuneaton
	Report

Grantchester Road
Attendance: 473
Referee: Darren Gamage

14 November 2009

(BP) Launceston	6 - 10	Esher
	Report

Polson Bridge
Attendance: 605
Referee: Steve Lee

14 November 2009
14:15

(BP) London Scottish	37 - 14	Otley
	Report

Richmond Athletic Ground
Attendance: 565
Referee: Michael Tutty

14 November 2009

Newbury Blues	3 - 0	Cinderford (BP)
	Report

Monk's Lane
Attendance: 369
Referee: Philip Davis

14 November 2009

(BP) Sedgley Park	11 - 12	Blaydon
	Report

Park Lane
Attendance: 497
Referee: Richard Kelly

14 November 2009
15:00

(BP) Stourbridge	22 - 20	Redruth (BP)
	Report

Stourton Park
Attendance: 450
Referee: John Meredith

14 November 2009

(BP) Tynedale	93 - 0	Manchester
	Report

Tynedale Park
Attendance: 396
Referee: Revis Phillips

=== Round 12 ===
28 November 2009

(BP) Blackheath	82 - 0	Manchester
	Report

Rectory Field
Attendance: 523
Referee: Mark Varnon

28 November 2009

(BP) Blaydon	16 - 19	Cambridge
	Report

Crow Trees
Attendance: 283
Referee: Andrew Taylorson

28 November 2009

Cinderford	10 - 18	Tynedale
	Report

Dockham Road
Attendance: 270
Referee: Ed Turnill

28 November 2009

(BP) Launceston	30 - 3	Nuneaton
	Report

Polson Bridge
Attendance: 537
Referee: P.W Davies

28 November 2009
15:00

London Scottish	19 - 5	Stourbridge
	Report

Richmond Athletic Ground
Attendance: 627
Referee: Paul Kimber

28 November 2009
14:15

Otley	10 - 57	Esher (BP)
	Report

Cross Green
Attendance: 287
Referee: Andrew Vertigan

28 November 2009
14:30

(BP) Redruth	29 - 3	Newbury Blues
	Report

The Recreation Ground
Attendance: 764
Referee: Mike Callan

28 November 2009

(BP) Wharfedale	35 - 9	Sedgley Park
	Report

The Avenue
Attendance: 536
Referee: Llyr Apgeraint-Roberts

=== Round 13 ===
5 December 2009

Blackheath	18 - 27	Cinderford
	Report

Rectory Field
Attendance: 392
Referee: Andrew Vertigan

5 December 2009

(BP) Cambridge	28 - 21	Wharfedale
	Report

Grantchester Road
Attendance: 489
Referee: Andrew Taylorson

5 December 2009

(BP) Esher	67 - 5	Nuneaton
	Report

Molesey Road
Attendance: 862
Referee: Ian Tempest

5 December 2009

(BP) Launceston	34 - 3	Blaydon
	Report

Polson Bridge
Attendance: 636
Referee: Marcus Caton

5 December 2009

(BP) Newbury Blues	23 - 26	London Scottish
	Report

Monk's Lane
Attendance: 571
Referee: Terry Hall

5 December 2009

(BP) Sedgley Park	80 - 3	Manchester
	Report

Park Lane
Attendance: 375
Referee: Brendan Fitzmaurice

5 December 2009
14:15

Stourbridge	10 - 0	Otley
	Report

Stourton Park
Attendance: 500
Referee: Ed Turnill

5 December 2009
14:00

(BP) Tynedale	32 - 15	Redruth
	Report

Tynedale Park
Attendance: 330
Referee: Mark Wilson

=== Round 14 ===
12 December 2009

Blaydon	17 - 29	Esher
	Report

Crow Trees
Attendance: 283
Referee: David Walker

12 December 2009

(BP) Cinderford	35 - 18	Sedgley Park
	Report

Dockham Road
Attendance: 195
Referee: Mark Wilson

12 December 2009

(BP) London Scottish	34 - 24	Tynedale
	Report

Richmond Athletic Ground
Attendance: 1,055
Referee: Llyr Apgeraint-Roberts

12 December 2009

Manchester	3 - 50	Cambridge (BP)
	Report

Grove Park
Attendance: 158
Referee: Revis Phillips

12 December 2009
14:15

Otley	13 - 9	Nuneaton (BP)
	Report

Cross Green
Attendance: 271
Referee: Marcus Caton

12 December 2009
14:30

Redruth	11 - 6	Blackheath (BP)
	Report

The Recreation Ground
Attendance: 860
Referee: Philip Davis

12 December 2009

(BP) Stourbridge	3 - 6	Newbury Blues
	Report

Stourton Park
Attendance: 500
Referee: Cemmy Rudkin

12 December 2009

Wharfedale	14 - 25	Launceston
	Report

The Avenue
Attendance: 402
Referee: John Meredith

=== Round 15 ===
19 December 2009

(BP) Launceston	66 - 0	Manchester
	Report

Polson Bridge
Attendance: 542
Referee: Paul Kimber

19 December 2009
14:15

Newbury	20 - 14	Otley (BP)
	Report

Monk's Lane
Attendance: 478
Referee: Andrew Taylorson

19 December 2009

Blackheath	P - P	London Scottish

- Postponed. Game rescheduled for 6 February 2010.

19 December 2009

Cambridge	P - P	Cinderford

- Postponed. Game rescheduled for 6 February 2010.

19 December 2009

Esher	P - P	Wharfedale

- Postponed. Game rescheduled for 6 February 2010.

19 December 2009

Nuneaton	P - P	Blaydon

- Postponed. Game rescheduled for 6 February 2010.

19 December 2009
14:00

Sedgley Park	P - P	Redruth

- Postponed. Game rescheduled for 6 February 2010.

19 December 2009

Tynedale	P - P	Stourbridge

- Postponed. Game rescheduled for 6 February 2010.

=== Round 16 ===
2 January 2010

(BP) London Scottish	33 - 10	Cambridge
	Report

Richmond Athletic Ground
Attendance: 2,215
Referee: Keith Lewis

2 January 2010

(BP) Newbury Blues	23 - 25	Blackheath
	Report

Monk's Lane
Attendance: 555
Referee: Ross Campbell

2 January 2010
14:30

(BP) Redruth	7 - 9	Launceston
	Report

The Recreation Ground
Attendance: 2,010
Referee: Michael Tutty

2 January 2010

Stourbridge	P - P	Sedgley Park

- Postponed. Game rescheduled for 20 March 2010.

2 January 2010

Cinderford	P - P	Esher

- Postponed. Game rescheduled to 15 May 2010.

2 January 2010

Manchester	P - P	Nuneaton

- Postponed. Game rescheduled to 20 March 2010.

2 January 2010

Tynedale	P - P	Otley

- Postponed. Game rescheduled to 21 March 2010.

2 January 2010

Wharfedale	P - P	Blaydon

- Postponed. Game rescheduled to 21 March 2010.

=== Round 17 ===
9 January 2010

Blackheath	P - P	Tynedale

- Postponed. Game rescheduled to 1 May 2010.

9 January 2010

Blaydon	P - P	Manchester

- Postponed. Game rescheduled to 1 May 2010.

9 January 2010

Cambridge	P - P	Stourbridge

- Postponed. Game rescheduled to 1 May 2010.

9 January 2010

Esher	P - P	Redruth

- Postponed. Game rescheduled to 1 May 2010.

9 January 2010

Launceston	P - P	London Scottish

- Postponed. Game rescheduled to 20 March 2010.

9 January 2010

Nuneaton	P - P	Cinderford

- Postponed. Game rescheduled to 1 May 2010.

9 January 2010

Otley	P - P	Wharfedale

- Postponed. Game rescheduled to 1 May 2010.

9 January 2010

Sedgley Park	P - P	Newbury Blues

- Postponed. Game rescheduled to 1 May 2010.

=== Round 18 ===
16 January 2010
14:30

(BP) Blackheath	32 - 5	Otley
	Report

Rectory Field
Attendance: 352
Referee: Ross Campbell

16 January 2010

London Scottish	15 - 38	Esher (BP)
	Report

Richmond Athletic Ground
Attendance: 2,485
Referee: Llyr Apgeraint-Roberts

17 January 2010

(BP) Manchester	23 - 45	Wharfedale
	Report

Grove Park
Referee: Richard Parker-Sedgemore

16 January 2010
14:30

(BP) Redruth	34 - 3	Nuneaton
	Report

The Recreation Ground
Attendance: 709
Referee: Simon Harding

16 January 2010

(BP) Stourbridge	22 - 26	Launceston (BP)
	Report

Stourton Park
Attendance: 550
Referee: Terry Hall

16 January 2010

(BP) Tynedale	41 - 0	Sedgley Park
	Report

Tynedale Park
Attendance: 330
Referee: Philip Davis

16 January 2010

Cinderford	P - P	Blaydon

- Postponed. Game rescheduled to 8 May 2010.

16 January 2010

Newbury Blues	P - P	Cambridge

- Postponed. Game rescheduled for 14 April 2010.

=== Round 19 ===
23 January 2010
14:00

(BP) Blaydon	42 - 10	Redruth
	Report

Crow Trees
Attendance: 314
Referee: J Matthews

23 January 2010

(BP) Cambridge	17 - 20	Tynedale
	Report

Grantchester Road
Attendance: 550
Referee: Llyr Apgeraint-Roberts

23 January 2010

(BP) Esher	89 - 0	Stourbridge
	Report

Molesey Road
Attendance: 1,016
Referee: Keith Lewis

23 January 2010

(2BP) Launceston	24 - 25	Newbury Blues
	Report

Polson Bridge
Attendance: 822
Referee: Richard Kelly

23 January 2010

Nuneaton	10 - 34	London Scottish (BP)
	Report

Liberty Way
Attendance: 247
Referee: Ross Campbell

23 January 2010
14:15

(BP) Otley	89 - 3	Manchester
	Report

Cross Green
Attendance: 416
Referee: Simon Harding

23 January 2010

(BP) Sedgley Park	24 - 28	Blackheath
	Report

Park Lane
Attendance: 247
Referee: Andrew Taylorson

23 January 2010

(BP) Wharfedale	37 - 17	Cinderford
	Report

The Avenue
Attendance: 432
Referee: Marcus Caton

=== Round 20 ===
30 January 2010

Blackheath	16 - 14	Cambridge (BP)
	Report

Rectory Field
Attendance: 624
Referee: John Meredith

30 January 2010

(BP) Cinderford	73 - 0	Manchester
	Report

Dockham Road
Attendance: 245
Referee: Nick Cockburn

30 January 2010

(BP) London Scottish	46 - 20	Blaydon
	Report

Richmond Athletic Ground
Attendance: 455
Referee: Ian Tempest

30 January 2010

Newbury Blues	7 - 56	Esher (BP)
	Report

Monk's Lane
Attendance: 542
Referee: Richard Kelly

30 January 2010
14:30

Redruth	13 - 34	Wharfedale (BP)
	Report

The Recreation Ground
Attendance: 708
Referee: Luke Pearce

30 January 2010

(BP) Stourbridge	27 - 12	Nuneaton
	Report

Stourton Park
Attendance: 500
Referee: Rowan Kitt

30 January 2010

(BP) Tynedale	38 - 22	Launceston
	Report

Tynedale Park
Attendance: 310
Referee: Chris Sharp

30 January 2010

Sedgley Park	P - P	Otley

- Postponed. Game rescheduled for 2 February 2010.

=== Round 20 (Rescheduled game) ===
2 February 2010
20:00

(BP) Sedgley Park	44 - 18	Otley
	Report

Park Lane
Attendance: 176
Referee: Steve Lee

- Rescheduled from 30 January 2010.

=== Round 15 (Rescheduled games) ===
6 February 2010

(2BP) Blackheath	30 - 31	London Scottish (BP)
	Report

Rectory Field
Attendance: 942
Referee: Michael Tutty

- Rescheduled from 19 December 2009.

6 February 2010

Cambridge	10 - 27	Cinderford (BP)
	Report

Grantchester Road
Attendance: 376
Referee: Ian Tempest

- Rescheduled from 19 December 2009.

6 February 2010

(BP) Esher	47 - 12	Wharfedale
	Report

Molesey Road
Attendance: 654
Referee: Paul Knowles

- Rescheduled from 19 December 2009.

6 February 2010

(BP) Nuneaton	20 - 24	Blaydon (BP)
	Report

Liberty Way
Attendance: 155
Referee: Marcus Caton

- Rescheduled from 19 December 2009.

6 February 2010

Sedgley Park	30 - 18	Redruth
	Report

Park Lane
Attendance: 352
Referee: Chris Sharp

- Rescheduled from 19 December 2009.

6 February 2010

(BP) Tynedale	71 - 14	Stourbridge
	Report

Tynedale Park
Attendance: 340
Referee: Andrew Vertigan

- Rescheduled from 19 December 2009.

=== Round 21 (Rescheduled game) ===
7 February 2010

Manchester	14 - 52	Redruth (BP)
	Report

Grove Park
Attendance: 230
Referee: Brendan Fitzmaurice

- Brought forward from 13 February 2010.

=== Round 21 ===
13 February 2010

Blaydon	19 - 10	Stourbridge
	Report

Crow Trees
Attendance: 196
Referee: Steve Lee

13 February 2010

Cambridge	16 - 14	Sedgley Park (BP)
	Report

Grantchester Road
Attendance: 475
Referee: Ross Campbell

13 February 2010

(BP) Esher	34 - 24	Tynedale
	Report

Molesey Road
Attendance: 720
Referee: Keith Lewis

13 February 2010

(BP) Launceston	41 - 18	Blackheath
	Report

Polson Bridge
Attendance: 710
Referee: Philip Davis

13 February 2010

(BP) Nuneaton	21 - 22	Newbury Blues
	Report

Liberty Way
Attendance: 180
Referee: Andrew Vertigan

13 February 2010
14:15

(BP) Otley	21 - 25	Cinderford
	Report

Cross Green
Attendance: 472
Referee: M Sharp

13 February 2010

Wharfedale	10 - 18	London Scottish
	Report

The Avenue
Attendance: 487
Referee: Andrew Taylorson

13 February 2010

Manchester	P - P	Redruth

- Brought forward to 7 February 2010.

=== Round 22 ===
20 February 2010

(BP) Blackheath	15 - 20	Esher
	Report

Rectory Field
Attendance: 723
Referee: Ian Tempest

20 February 2010
14:15

(BP) Cambridge	31 - 3	Otley
	Report

Grantchester Road
Attendance: 510
Referee: Marcus Caton

20 February 2010

(BP) London Scottish	87 - 7	Manchester
	Report

Richmond Athletic Ground
Attendance: 550
Referee: Simon McConnell

20 February 2010

Newbury Blues	25 - 33	Blaydon (BP)
	Report

Monk's Lane
Attendance: 424
Referee: Rowan Kitt

20 February 2010
14:30

Redruth	21 - 20	Cinderford (BP)
	Report

The Recreation Ground
Attendance: 821
Referee: Richard Kelly

20 February 2010

(BP) Stourbridge	19 - 24	Wharfedale (BP)
	Report

Stourton Park
Attendance: 500
Referee: Andrew Vertigan

20 February 2010

(2BP) Sedgley Park	35 - 42	Launceston (BP)
	Report

Park Lane
Attendance: 380
Referee: Ed Turnill

20 February 2010

(BP) Tynedale	33 - 12	Nuneaton
	Report

Tynedale Park
Attendance: 310
Referee: Simon Harding

=== Round 23 ===
27 February 2010

Blaydon	13 - 11	Tynedale (BP)
	Report

Crow Trees
Attendance: 1,021
Referee: Richard Kelly

27 February 2010

Cinderford	13 - 21	London Scottish
	Report

Dockham Road
Attendance: 230
Referee: Philip Davis

27 February 2010

(BP) Launceston	26 - 25	Cambridge (BP)
	Report

Polson Bridge
Attendance: 585
Referee: Terry Hall

27 February 2010

Manchester	0 - 84	Stourbridge (BP)
	Report

Grove Park
Attendance: 240
Referee: Revis Phillips

27 February 2010

Nuneaton	22 - 10	Blackheath
	Report

Liberty Way
Attendance: 149
Referee: Ross Campbell

27 February 2010
14:15

(BP) Otley	22 - 20	Redruth (BP)
	Report

Cross Green
Attendance: 429
Referee: Andrew Taylorson

27 February 2010

Wharfedale	20 - 5	Newbury Blues
	Report

The Avenue
Attendance: 454
Referee: Ian Tempest

27 February 2010

Esher	P - P	Sedgley Park

- Postponed. Game rescheduled for 8 May 2010.

=== Round 24 ===
6 March 2010

(BP) Blackheath	39 - 17	Blaydon
	Report

Rectory Field
Attendance: 682
Referee: Keith Lewis

6 March 2010

Cambridge	15 - 53	Esher (BP)
	Report

Grantchester Road
Attendance: 752
Referee: Ed Turnill

6 March 2010
14:30

(BP) Launceston	50 - 18	Otley
	Report

Polson Bridge
Attendance: 610
Referee: Ian Tempest

6 March 2010
14:30

London Scottish	16 - 8	Redruth
	Report

Richmond Athletic Ground
Attendance: 730
Referee: Rowan Kitt

6 March 2010

(BP) Newbury Blues	90 - 5	Manchester
	Report

Monk's Lane
Attendance: 404
Referee: Tom Davis

6 March 2010

(BP) Sedgley Park	34 - 12	Nuneaton
	Report

Park Lane
Attendance: 397
Referee: Llyr Apgeraint-Roberts

6 March 2010

Stourbridge	20 - 13	Cinderford (BP)
	Report

Stourton Park
Attendance: 650
Referee: Cemmy Rudkin

6 March 2010

(BP) Tynedale	50 - 18	Wharfedale
	Report

Tynedale Park
Attendance: 420
Referee: Steve Lee

=== Round 25 ===
13 March 2010

Blaydon	41 - 8	Sedgley Park
	Report

Crow Trees
Attendance: 120
Referee: Ross Campbell

13 March 2010

(BP) Cinderford	29 - 13	Newbury Blues
	Report

Dockham Road
Attendance: 225
Referee: Philip Davis

13 March 2010

(BP) Esher	29 - 3	Launceston
	Report

Molesey Road
Attendance: 993
Referee: Richard Kelly

13 March 2010

Manchester	6 - 70	Tynedale (BP)
	Report

Grove Park
Attendance: 121
Referee: Mark Liddell

13 March 2010

Nuneaton	10 - 35	Cambridge (BP)
	Report

Liberty Way
Attendance: 424
Referee: John Meredith

13 March 2010
14:15

(BP) Otley	35 - 34	London Scottish (2BP)
	Report

Cross Green
Attendance: 294
Referee: Ian Tempest

13 March 2010
15:00

(BP) Redruth	42 - 10	Stourbridge
	Report

The Recreation Ground
Attendance: 718
Referee: Steve Lee

13 March 2010

(BP) Wharfedale	50 - 17	Blackheath
	Report

The Avenue
Attendance: 445
Referee: Llyr Apgeraint-Roberts

=== Rounds 16 & 17 (Rescheduled games) ===
20 January 2010

Launceston	13 - 12	London Scottish (BP)
	Report

Polson Bridge
Attendance: 685
Referee: Michael Tutty

- Rescheduled from 9 January 2010.

20 March 2010

Manchester	0 - 50	Nuneaton (BP)
	Report

Grove Park
Attendance: 110
Referee: D Edmunds

- Rescheduled from 2 January 2010.

20 March 2010

(BP) Stourbridge	18 - 21	Sedgley Park
	Report

Stourton Park
Attendance: 400
Referee: Marcus Caton

- Rescheduled from 2 January 2010.

21 March 2010
14:30

(BP) Tynedale	40 - 17	Otley
	Report

Tynedale Park
Attendance: 360
Referee: Brendan Fitzmaurice

- Rescheduled from 2 January 2010.

21 March 2010

Wharfedale	28 - 22	Blaydon (BP)
	Report

The Avenue
Attendance: 503
Referee: Darren Gamage

- Rescheduled from 2 January 2010.

=== Round 26 ===
27 March 2010

(BP) Cambridge	42 - 31	Blaydon (BP)
	Report

Grantchester Road
Attendance: 595
Referee: Steve Lee

27 March 2010
15:00

(BP) Esher	92 - 0	Otley
	Report

Molesey Road
Attendance: 1,017
Referee: Ian Tempest

27 March 2010

Manchester	7 - 56	Blackheath (BP)
	Report

Grove Park
Attendance: 320
Referee: Matthew Daubney

27 March 2010
15:00

Newbury Blues	28 - 22	Redruth (BP)
	Report

Monk's Lane
Attendance: 468
Referee: Ross Campbell

27 March 2010

Nuneaton	14 - 36	Launceston (BP)
	Report

Liberty Way
Attendance: 215
Referee: Richard Kelly

27 March 2010

(BP) Sedgley Park	24 - 29	Wharfedale (BP)
	Report

Park Lane
Attendance: 397
Referee: David Walker

27 March 2010

(BP) Stourbridge	27 - 14	London Scottish
	Report

Stourton Park
Attendance: 450
Referee: Philip Davis

27 March 2010

(BP) Tynedale	33 - 19	Cinderford
	Report

Tynedale Park
Attendance: 485
Referee: John Meredith

=== Round 27 ===
2 April 2010

Nuneaton	3 - 41	Esher (BP)
	Report

Liberty Way
Attendance: 263
Referee: Darren Gamage

2 April 2010

(BP) Wharfedale	31 - 20	Cambridge
	Report

The Avenue
Attendance: 678
Referee: Steve Lee

3 April 2010

(BP) Blaydon	35 - 26	Launceston (BP)
	Report

Crow Trees
Attendance: 147
Referee: Andrew Vertigan

3 April 2010

Cinderford	10 - 7	Blackheath (BP)
	Report

Dockham Road
Attendance: 215
Referee: Philip Davis

3 April 2010

(BP) London Scottish	41 - 20	Newbury Blues
	Report

Richmond Athletic Ground
Attendance: 675
Referee: Ian Tempest

3 April 2010

Manchester	0 - 83	Sedgley Park (BP)
	Report

Grove Park
Attendance: 220
Referee: Rob Sheard

3 April 2010
15:00

(BP) Otley	42 - 34	Stourbridge (BP)
	Report

Cross Green
Attendance: 417
Referee: Chris Sharp

3 April 2010
15:00

(BP) Redruth	24 - 14	Tynedale
	Report

The Recreation Ground
Attendance: 758
Referee: Ed Turnill

=== Round 28 ===
10 April 2010
15:00

Blackheath	34 - 12	Redruth
	Report

Rectory Field
Attendance: 650
Referee: Keith Lewis

10 April 2010

(BP) Cambridge	112 - 7	Manchester
	Report

Grantchester Road
Attendance: 623
Referee: Ed Turnill

10 April 2010

(BP) Esher	31 - 12	Blaydon
	Report

Molesey Road
Attendance: 1,267
Referee: Simon McConnell

10 April 2010

(BP) Launceston	38 - 24	Wharfedale (BP)
	Report

Polson Bridge
Attendance: 705
Referee: Richard Kelly

10 April 2010

(BP) Newbury Blues	23 - 24	Stourbridge
	Report

Monk's Lane
Attendance: 480
Referee: Terry Hall

10 April 2010
15:00

Nuneaton	13 - 55	Otley (BP)
	Report

Liberty Way
Attendance: 210
Referee: Philip Davis

10 April 2010

(BP) Sedgley Park	39 - 34	Cinderford (2BP)
	Report

Park Lane
Attendance: 281
Referee: Michael Tutty

10 April 2010

(BP) Tynedale	59 - 22	London Scottish
	Report

Tynedale Park
Attendance: 585
Referee: Chris Sharp

=== Round 18 (Rescheduled game) ===
14 April 2010

Newbury Blues	10 - 36	Cambridge (BP)
	Report

Monk's Lane
Attendance: 328
Referee: Keith Lewis

- Rescheduled from 16 January 2010.

=== Round 29 ===
17 April 2010

(BP) Blaydon	68 - 18	Nuneaton
	Report

Crow Trees
Attendance: 105
Referee: Andrew Vertigan

17 April 2010

(BP) Cinderford	24 - 31	Cambridge (BP)
	Report

Dockham Road
Attendance: 250
Referee: Chris Sharp

17 April 2010

London Scottish	24 - 24	Blackheath
	Report

Richmond Athletic Ground
Attendance: 1,725
Referee: Paul Knowles

17 April 2010

Manchester	8 - 71	Launceston (BP)
	Report

Grove Park
Attendance: 122
Referee: Mark Varnon

17 April 2010
15:00

(BP) Otley	34 - 14	Newbury Blues
	Report

Cross Green
Attendance: 327
Referee: Darren Gamage

17 April 2010
15:00

(BP) Redruth	33 - 13	Sedgley Park
	Report

The Recreation Ground
Attendance: 819
Referee: Simon Harding

17 April 2010

(BP) Stourbridge	38 - 28	Tynedale (BP)
	Report

Stourton Park
Attendance: 550
Referee: Philip Davis

17 April 2010

(BP) Wharfedale	24 - 38	Esher (BP)
	Report

The Avenue
Attendance: 542
Referee: Steve Lee

=== Round 30 ===
24 April 2010

(BP) Blackheath	39 - 35	Stourbridge (2BP)
	Report

Rectory Field
Attendance: 700
Referee: Darren Gamage

24 April 2010
15:00

Cambridge	15 - 10	Redruth (BP)
	Report

Grantchester Road
Attendance: 722
Referee: John Meredith

24 April 2010

(BP) Esher	119 - 0	Manchester
	Report

Molesey Road
Attendance: 987
Referee: Ian Tempest

24 April 2010

Launceston	26 - 19	Cinderford (BP)
	Report

Polson Bridge
Attendance: 887
Referee: Keith Lewis

24 April 2010

(BP) Nuneaton	34 - 27	Wharfedale (2BP)
	Report

Liberty Way
Attendance: 172
Referee: Richard Kelly

24 April 2010
15:00

(BP) Otley	36 - 12	Blaydon
	Report

Cross Green
Attendance: 367
Referee: Paul Knowles

24 April 2010

(BP) Sedgley Park	28 - 35	London Scottish (BP)
	Report

Park Lane
Attendance: 316
Referee: Andrew Jackson

24 April 2010

(BP) Tynedale	40 - 26	Newbury (BP)
	Report

Tynedale Park
Attendance: 630
Referee: Chris Sharp

=== Round 17 (Rescheduled games) ===
1 May 2010

(BP) Blackheath	48 - 24	Tynedale (BP)
	Report

Rectory Field
Attendance: 593
Referee: Luke Pearce

- Rescheduled from 9 January 2010.

1 May 2010

(BP) Blaydon	140 - 0	Manchester
	Report

Crow Trees
Attendance: 375
Referee: Andrew Jackson

- Rescheduled from 9 January 2010.

1 May 2010

(BP) Cambridge	44 - 26	Stourbridge (BP)
	Report

Grantchester Road
Attendance: 344
Referee: Andrew Vertigan

- Rescheduled from 9 January 2010.

1 May 2010

(BP) Esher	29 - 5	Redruth
	Report

Molesey Road
Attendance: 772
Referee: Ross Campbell

- Rescheduled from 9 January 2010.

1 May 2010

Nuneaton	17 - 43	Cinderford (BP)
	Report

Liberty Way
Attendance: 265
Referee: Keith Lewis

- Rescheduled from 9 January 2010.

1 May 2010
15:00

Otley	17 - 35	Wharfedale (BP)
	Report

Cross Green
Attendance: 894
Referee: Andrew Taylorson

- Rescheduled from 9 January 2010.

1 May 2010

(BP) Sedgley Park	51 - 40	Newbury Blues (BP)
	Report

Park Lane
Attendance: 205
Referee: Steve Lee

- Rescheduled from 9 January 2010.

=== Rounds 18 & 23 (Rescheduled games) ===
8 May 2010

Cinderford	24 - 19	Blaydon (BP)
	Report

Dockham Road
Attendance: 220
Referee: Greg MacDonald

- Rescheduled from 16 January 2010.

8 May 2010

(BP) Esher	48 - 21	Sedgley Park
	Report

Molesey Road
Attendance: 694
Referee: Simon Harding

- Rescheduled from 27 February 2010.

=== Round 16 (Rescheduled game) ===
15 May 2010

Cinderford	C - C	Esher

- Rescheduled from 2 January 2010. Game cancelled as Cinderford did not have enough front row players and match would not have any outcome as Esher had already won the title and Cinderford were safe from relegation.

== Total season attendances ==
Club	Home Games	Total	Average	Highest	Lowest	% Capacity
Blackheath	15	9,387	626	942	352	18%
Blaydon	15	5,127	342	1,021	105	17%
Cambridge	15	8,606	574	1,020	344	26%
Cinderford	14 (Note: Cinderford only played 14 home games as their final game against Esher was cancelled.)	3,505	250	400	195	17%
Esher	15	14,122	941	1,294	654	31%
Launceston	15	10,801	720	1,437	537	24%
London Scottish	15	15,216	1,014	2,485	455	23%
Manchester	14 (Note: Missing home attendance v Wharfedale on 17 January 2010.)	2,840	203	320	110	5%
Newbury Blues	15	6,855	457	571	328	6%
Nuneaton	15	3,553	237	424	149	6%
Otley	15	6,217	414	894	271	6%
Redruth	15	13,974	932	2,010	708	27%
Sedgley Park	14 (Note: Missing home attendance v Stourbridge on 12 September 2009.)	5,113	365	512	176	12%
Stourbridge	15	7,500	500	650	400	14%
Tynedale	15	7,158	477	910	310	24%
Wharfedale	15	7,876	525	868	402	26%

== Individual statistics ==
- Note if players are tied on tries or points the player with the lowest number of appearances will come first. Also note that points scorers includes tries as well as conversions, penalties and drop goals.

=== Top points scorers ===
Rank	Player	Team	Appearances	Points
1	(England) Sam Ulph	Esher	24	399
2	(England) Frankie Neale	London Scottish	25	279
3	(England) Tony Yapp	Launceston	28	274
4	(England) Paul Humphries	Blackheath	27	264
5	(England) Mark Bedworth	Wharfedale	28	251
6	(England) Mitch Burton	Newbury Blues	29	216
7	(Wales) Huw Thomas	Nuneaton	30	201
8	(England) Stephen Nutt	Sedgley Park	27	187
9	(England) Matthew Riley	Sedgley Park	29	180
10	(Scotland) James Murray	Otley	21	170

=== Top try scorers ===
Rank	Player	Team	Appearances	Tries
1	(South Africa) Johannes Schmidt	Cambridge	28	30
2	(England) Seb Jewell	Esher	25	22
3	(England) Charles Broughton	London Scottish	23	20
3	(England) Tyson Lewis	Blackheath	24	20
4	(Scotland) Shaun Renwick	Esher	27	19
4	(England) David Sleman	Esher	27	19
4	(England) Lewis Vinnicombe	Redruth	28	19
5	(England) Charlie Ingall	Tynedale	22	18
6	(England) David Allen	Blackheath	21	17
7	(South Africa) Chris Malherbe	Wharfedale	22	16

== Season records ==
=== Team ===
Largest home win — 119 pts

124 - 5 Wharfedale at home to Manchester on 26 September 2009

Largest away win — 148 pts

148 - 0 Esher away to Manchester on 5 September 2009

Most points scored — 148 pts

148 - 0 Esher away to Manchester on 5 September 2009

Most tries in a match — 23

Blaydon away to Manchester on 19 September 2009

Most conversions in a match — 19

Esher away to Manchester on 5 September 2009

Most penalties in a match — 5

N/A - multiple teams

Most drop goals in a match — 2

Newbury Blues away to Blackheath on 12 September 2009

=== Player ===
Most points in a match — 51

(England) Sam Ulph for Esher away to Manchester on 5 September 2009

Most tries in a match — 6 (x2)

(South Africa) Johannes Schmidt for Cambridge at home to Manchester on 10 April 2010
(England) Seb Jewell for Esher at home to Manchester on 24 April 2010

Most conversions in a match — 18

(England) Sam Ulph for Esher away to Manchester on 5 September 2009

Most penalties in a match — 5

N/A - multiple players

Most drop goals in a match — 2

(England) Mitch Burton for Newbury Blues away to Blackheath on 12 September 2009

=== Attendances ===
Highest — 2,485

London Scottish at home to Esher on 16 January 2010

Lowest — 105

Blaydon at home to Nuneaton on 17 April 2010

Highest Average Attendance — 1,014

London Scottish

Lowest Average Attendance — 203

Manchester

== See also ==
- English Rugby Union Leagues
- English rugby union system
- Rugby union in England
