= Bradford & Bingley RFC =

English rugby union club, based in Bingley, West Yorkshire

Bradford & Bingley
- Full name: Bradford and Bingley Rugby Football Club
- Union: Yorkshire RFU
- Nickname(s): Bees
- Founded: 1982; 43 years ago
- Location: Bingley, West Yorkshire, England
- Ground(s): Wagon Lane (Capacity: 4,000)
- Chairman: Andy Watts
- President: Nick Patterson
- Captain(s): Mat Cochrane
- League(s): Yorkshire 2
- 202-25: 9th
Team kit

Official website
- www.pitchero.com/clubs/bradfordandbingleyrfc/

Bradford & Bingley Rugby Football Club is an English rugby union team based in Bingley, West Yorkshire. The club runs four senior sides, including a veterans side, and eleven junior teams. The first XV plays in North 1 East.

== Bumble Bee Barbarians ==
Bradford & Bingley RFC is home of the Bumble Bee Barbarians, England's first mixed ability rugby team. Founded in 2009 by a determined young man with Cerebral Palsy and Learning Difficulties the team now has over 30 players. In August 2015 the first ever mixed ability World Cup tournament with take place at their home ground at Wagon Lane

== History ==
The club was formed in 1982 following a merger between Bingley RFC and Bradford RFC.

== Club honours ==
- North 1 East champions (3): 1988–89, 1998–99, 2002–03 (Note: Includes 2 titles when North 1 East and North 1 West were merged into one division known as North Division 2.)
- North 1 champions (2): 1992–93, 2003–04
- RFU Intermediate Cup winners: 2004
- National League 3 North champions: 2005–06
- Yorkshire 1 champions: 2015–16
