= 2018–19 National League 1 =

Rugby union competition in England

- Countries: England
- Date: 1 September 2018 – 27 April 2019
- Champions: Ampthill (1st title)
- Runners-up: Old Elthamians
- Relegated: Loughborough Students, Esher, Caldy
- Matches played: 240
- Attendance: 131,144 (average 546 per match)
- Highest attendance: 3,556; Plymouth Albion v Moseley; 30 March 2019
- Lowest attendance: 133; Old Elthamians v Caldy; 1 December 2018
- Tries scored: 1600 (average 6.7 per match)
- Top point scorer: (England) Tom White (Old Elthamians); 270 points
- Top try scorer: (England) Craig Holland (Chinnor); 25 tries

The 2018–19 National League 1, known for sponsorship reasons as the SSE National League 1, is the tenth season of the third tier of the English rugby union system, since the professionalised format of the second tier RFU Championship was introduced; and is the 32nd season since league rugby began in 1987.

The league was one of the most competitive for years, with promotion and relegation not decided until the last round. In terms of the championship, at one point it looked like four teams could go on to win it, but in the end it was a two horse race between Ampthill and Old Elthamians. The real decider was when Ampthill won 36-6 at home over Old Elthamians on 3 March 2019, but they still had to keep their head for the remaining five games as Old Elthamians pushed them all the way, eventually claiming the title on 27 April 2019 when they won 52-20 away to Loughborough Students. Ampthill would be promoted to the 2019–20 RFU Championship - the highest level the club had reached - where they could enjoy derby games at Bedford Blues.

The relegation battle was also hotly contested, with all three sides going down on the last day of the season. Loughborough Students had barely escaped relegation the previous year but after a poor first half of the season, they started to rally and gain some victories, helped by their try bonus record which was one of the best in the league, and looked at one point that they might do it yet again. However, defeats in their last two games against Plymouth Albion and champions, Ampthill, condemned them to the drop as the bottom ranked side in the division. They were joined by Esher (15th), who went down despite a valiant win away to Blackheath, and Caldy (14th), who were relegated after losing to Birmingham Moseley, finishing just 2 points shy of 13th place Cambridge, who had an excellent away win to Sale FC to thank for keeping them up. Loughborough and Caldy would drop to the 2019–20 National League 2 North while Esher would fall to the 2019–20 National League 2 South. For Esher demotion to level 4 will make it the lowest level they have played at since the 1999-00 season.

== Structure ==
The league consists of sixteen teams with all the teams playing each other on a home and away basis to make a total of thirty matches each. There is one promotion place with the champions promoted to the Greene King IPA Championship. There are usually three relegation places with the bottom three teams relegated to either National League 2 North or National League 2 South depending on the geographical location of the team.

The results of the matches contribute points to the league as follows:

- 4 points are awarded for a win
- 2 points are awarded for a draw
- 0 points are awarded for a loss, however
- 1 losing (bonus) point is awarded to a team that loses a match by 7 points or fewer
- 1 additional (bonus) point is awarded to a team scoring 4 tries or more in a match.

== Participating teams and locations ==
Twelve of the sixteen teams participated in the preceding season's competition. The 2017–18 champions, Coventry, were promoted to the 2018–19 RFU Championship, swapping places with bottom club, Rotherham Titans, who were relegated from the 2017–18 RFU Championship. Sides relegated from the 2017–18 National League 1 included Fylde and Hull Ionians (both National League 2 North) and Old Albanian (National League 2 South).

Teams promoted into the division include Cinderford and Sale FC, champions of 2017–18 National League 2 South and 2017–18 National League 2 North respectively, along with south runners up Chinnor who defeated the north's Sedgley Park in the promotion play-off. Cinderford are returning to National League 1 after an absence of two seasons, while Sale FC and Chinnor are both playing at the highest league level in their history.

Team	Ground	Capacity	City/Area	Previous season
Ampthill	Dillingham Park	3,000	Ampthill, Bedfordshire	4th
Birmingham Moseley	Billesley Common	5,000 (1,300 seated)	Birmingham, West Midlands	7th
Bishop's Stortford	Silver Leys	1,600	Bishop's Stortford, Hertfordshire	8th
Blackheath	Well Hall	1,650 (550 seats)	Eltham, Greenwich, Greater London	5th
Caldy	Paton Field	4,000	Thurstaston, Wirral, Merseyside	11th
Cambridge	Grantchester Road	2,200 (200 seats)	Cambridge, Cambridgeshire	10th
Chinnor	Kingsey Road	2,000	Thame, Oxfordshire	Promoted from National 2 South (play-off)
Cinderford	Dockham Road	2,500	Cinderford, Gloucestershire	Promoted from National 2 South (champions)
Darlington Mowden Park	Northern Echo Arena	25,500	Darlington, County Durham	2nd
Esher	Molesey Road	3,500	Hersham, Surrey	9th
Loughborough Students	Loughborough University Stadium	3,000	Loughborough, Leicestershire	13th
Old Elthamians	College Meadow	1,800	Eltham, Greenwich, London	6th
Plymouth Albion	The Brickfields	8,500	Plymouth, Devon	3rd
Rosslyn Park	The Rock	2,000 (630 seats)	Roehampton, London	12th
Rotherham Titans	Clifton Lane	2,500	Rotherham, South Yorkshire	Relegated from Championship (12th)
Sale FC	Heywood Road	3,387	Sale, Greater Manchester	Promoted from National 2 North (champions)

2018–19 National 1 teams in England

== League table ==
2018–19 National League 1 table
Pos	Team	Pld	W	D	L	PF	PA	PD	TB	LB	Pts	Qualification
1	Ampthill (C)	30	23	1	6	970	583	+387	21	5	120	Promotion place
2	Old Elthamians	30	23	2	5	845	562	+283	17	2	115	
3	Rosslyn Park	30	21	1	8	873	699	+174	16	4	106	
4	Blackheath	30	20	1	9	794	601	+193	17	6	105	
5	Plymouth Albion	30	16	0	14	701	690	+11	13	6	83	
6	Rotherham Titans	30	16	0	14	717	705	+12	13	5	82	
7	Darlington Mowden Park	30	13	1	16	739	790	−51	16	7	77	
8	Cinderford	30	13	1	16	624	710	−86	11	7	72	
9	Bishop's Stortford	30	13	0	17	758	627	+131	12	8	72	
10	Chinnor	30	11	2	17	735	862	−127	15	9	72	
11	Sale FC	30	12	1	17	732	873	−141	12	6	68	
12	Birmingham Moseley	30	11	1	18	768	857	−89	13	9	68	
13	Cambridge	30	12	1	17	574	617	−43	5	9	64	
14	Caldy (R)	30	11	0	19	579	771	−192	9	9	62	Relegation place
15	Esher (R)	30	11	0	19	627	803	−176	9	8	61	Relegation place
16	Loughborough Students (R)	30	8	0	22	821	1107	−286	19	6	57	Relegation place

Updated to match(es) played on 27 April 2019. Source: "National League 1". NCA Rugby.
Rules for classification: If teams are level at any stage, tiebreakers are applied in the following order:
1. Number of matches won
2. Difference between points for and against
3. Total number of points for
4. Aggregate number of points scored in matches between tied teams
5. Number of matches won excluding the first match, then the second and so on until the tie is settled

== Fixtures & Results ==
=== Round 1 ===
1 September 2018
14:00

(2 BP) Rotherham Titans	33 – 34	Old Elthamians (1 BP)
	Report

Clifton Lane
Attendance: 579
Referee: Neil Chivers

1 September 2018
15:00

(1 BP) Ampthill	43 – 34	Loughborough Students (1 BP)
	Report

Dillingham Park
Attendance: 328
Referee: Dan Parrott

1 September 2018
15:00

(1 BP) Bishop's Stortford	23 – 26	Darlington Mowden Park (1 BP)
	Report

Silver Leys
Attendance: 510
Referee: Veryan Boscawen

1 September 2018
15:00

(1 BP) Cambridge	36 – 36	Sale FC (1 BP)
	Report

Grantchester Road
Attendance: 381
Referee: Alexander Thomas

1 September 2018
15:00

(2 BP) Cinderford	29 – 36	Rosslyn Park (1 BP)
	Report

Dockham Road
Attendance: 318
Referee: Jack Lewars

1 September 2018
15:00

Esher	7 – 36	Blackheath (1 BP)
	Report

Molesey Road
Attendance: 417
Referee: Jonathan Cook

1 September 2018
15:00

Plymouth Albion	11 – 26	Chinnor
	Report

Brickfields
Attendance: 985
Referee: Calum Howard

2 September 2018
15:00

Caldy	30 – 27	Birmingham Moseley (1 BP)
	Report

Paton Field
Attendance: 487
Referee: Harry Walbaum

=== Round 2 ===
8 September 2018
15:00

(1 BP) Birmingham Moseley	23 – 24	Cinderford
	Report

Billesley Common
Attendance: 656
Referee: Owen Taylor

8 September 2018
15:00

Blackheath	10 – 21	Old Elthamians
	Report

Well Hall
Attendance: 1,095
Referee: Veryan Boscawen

8 September 2018
15:00

(1 BP) Chinnor	38 – 33	Ampthill (2 BP)
	Report

Kingsey Road
Attendance: 503
Referee: James Clarke

8 September 2018
15:00

(1 BP) Darlington Mowden Park	42 – 19	Rotherham Titans
	Report

Darlington Arena
Attendance: 855
Referee: Harry Walbaum

8 September 2018
15:00

(1 BP) Esher	21 – 24	Plymouth Albion (1 BP)
	Report

Molesey Road
Attendance: 553
Referee: Jack Lewars

8 September 2018
15:00

(1 BP) Loughborough Students	14 – 20	Cambridge
	Report

Loughborough University Stadium
Attendance: 234
Referee: Philip Davies

8 September 2018
15:00

Rosslyn Park	25 – 17	Bishop's Stortford
	Report

The Rock
Attendance: 583
Referee: Calum Howard

8 September 2018
15:00

Sale FC	26 – 24	Caldy (1 BP)
	Report

Heywood Road
Attendance: 509
Referee: Dan Parrott

=== Round 3 ===
15 September 2018
14:00

Rotherham Titans	29 – 12	Rosslyn Park
	Report

Clifton Lane
Attendance: 513
Referee: Matt Turvey

15 September 2018
15:00

(1 BP) Ampthill	35 – 20	Esher
	Report

Dillingham Park
Attendance: 427
Referee: Calum Howard

15 September 2018
15:00

(1 BP) Bishop's Stortford	52 – 8	Birmingham Moseley
	Report

Silver Leys
Attendance: 665
Referee: Jonathan Cook

15 September 2018
15:00

(1 BP) Cambridge	20 – 22	Chinnor (1 BP)
	Report

Grantchester Road
Attendance: 411
Referee: Stephen Copeman

15 September 2018
15:00

(1 BP) Cinderford	40 – 31	Sale FC (1 BP)
	Report

Dockham Road
Attendance: 313
Referee: Luke Davies

15 September 2018
15:00

(1 BP) Old Elthamians	41 – 22	Darlington Mowden Park
	Report

College Meadow
Attendance: 431
Referee: Alexander Thomas

15 September 2018
15:00

(1 BP) Plymouth Albion	20 – 21	Blackheath
	Report

Brickfields
Attendance: 682
Referee: Daniel Collins

16 September 2018
14:00

(1 BP) Caldy	43 – 19	Loughborough Students
	Report

Paton Field
Attendance: 432
Referee: James O'Brien

=== Round 4 ===
22 September 2018
14:00

Loughborough Students	8 – 39	Cinderford (1 BP)
	Report

Loughborough University Stadium
Attendance: 712
Referee: Veryan Boscawen

22 September 2018
15:00

(1 BP) Birmingham Moseley	28 – 22	Rotherham Titans (1 BP)
	Report

Billesley Common
Attendance: 736
Referee: Matt Turvey

22 September 2018
15:00

Blackheath	15 – 0	Darlington Mowden Park
	Report

Well Hall
Attendance: 457
Referee: James Clarke

22 September 2018
15:00

(2 BP) Chinnor	24 – 27	Caldy (1 BP)
	Report

Kingsey Road
Attendance: 539
Referee: Calum Howard

22 September 2018
15:00

Esher	17 – 10	Cambridge (1 BP)
	Report

Molesey Road
Attendance: 317
Referee: Philip Davies

22 September 2018
15:00

Plymouth Albion	17 – 5	Ampthill
	Report

Brickfields
Attendance: 558
Referee: Alexander Thomas

22 September 2018
15:00

(1 BP) Rosslyn Park	37 – 24	Old Elthamians
	Report

The Rock
Attendance: 563
Referee: Jack Lewars

22 September 2018
15:00

Sale FC	22 – 8	Bishop's Stortford
	Report

Heywood Road
Attendance: 498
Referee: Harry Walbaum

=== Round 5 ===
29 September 2018
14:00

(1 BP) Rotherham Titans	32 – 27	Sale FC (1 BP)
	Report

Clifton Lane
Attendance: 534
Referee: Veryan Boscawen

29 September 2018
15:00

(1 BP) Ampthill	33 – 22	Blackheath
	Report

Dillingham Park
Attendance: 470
Referee: Matt Turvey

29 September 2018
15:00

(1 BP) Bishop's Stortford	57 – 25	Loughborough Students
	Report

Silver Leys
Attendance: 519
Referee: Rhys Jones

29 September 2018
15:00

(1 BP) Caldy	31 – 29	Esher (2 BP)
	Report

Paton Field
Attendance: 409
Referee: Charles Gayther

29 September 2018
15:00

(1 BP) Cambridge	32 – 26	Plymouth Albion (2 BP)
	Report

Grantchester Road
Attendance: 404
Referee: Jonathan Cook

29 September 2018
15:00

(1 BP) Cinderford	21 – 26	Chinnor
	Report

Dockham Road
Attendance: 539
Referee: Dan Parrott

29 September 2018
15:00

(1 BP) Darlington Mowden Park	34 – 33	Rosslyn Park (2 BP)
	Report

Darlington Arena
Attendance: 977
Referee: Glynn Thomas

29 September 2018
15:00

(1 BP) Old Elthamians	38 – 27	Birmingham Moseley
	Report

College Meadow
Attendance: 525
Referee: Daniel Collins

=== Round 6 ===
6 October 2018
15:00

(1 BP) Ampthill	6 – 13	Cambridge
	Report

Dillingham Park
Attendance: 317
Referee: Daniel Collins

6 October 2018
15:00

(2 BP) Birmingham Moseley	36 – 41	Darlington Mowden Park (1 BP)
	Report

Billesley Common
Attendance: 571
Referee: Dan Parrott

6 October 2018
15:00

Blackheath	23 – 15	Rosslyn Park
	Report

Well Hall
Attendance: 337
Referee: Jonathan Cook

6 October 2018
15:00

(1 BP) Chinnor	6 – 13	Bishop's Stortford
	Report

Kingsey Road
Attendance: 353
Referee: Alexander Thomas

6 October 2018
15:00

Esher	10 – 7	Cinderford (1 BP)
	Report

Molesey Road
Attendance: 299
Referee: James Clarke

6 October 2018
15:00

Loughborough Students	5 – 38	Rotherham Titans (1 BP)
	Report

Loughborough University Stadium
Attendance: 314
Referee: Dave Sutherland

6 October 2018
15:00

(1 BP) Plymouth Albion	24 – 14	Caldy
	Report

Brickfields
Attendance: 837
Referee: Jack Lewars

6 October 2018
15:00

(1 BP) Sale FC	42 – 38	Old Elthamians (2 BP)
	Report

Heywood Road
Attendance: 620
Referee: Finlay Brown

=== Round 7 ===
13 October 2018
14:00

(1 BP) Rotherham Titans	32 – 26	Chinnor (2 BP)
	Report

Clifton Lane
Attendance: 617
Referee: Jamie Leahy

13 October 2018
14:30

(1 BP) Old Elthamians	48 – 24	Loughborough Students (1 BP)
	Report

College Meadow
Attendance: 331
Referee: Andrew MacNeaney

13 October 2018
15:00

(2 BP) Bishop's Stortford	26 – 29	Esher (1 BP)
	Report

Silver Leys
Attendance: 702
Referee: Richard Haughton

13 October 2018
15:00

Caldy	19 – 18	Ampthill (1 BP)
	Report

Paton Field
Attendance: 287
Referee: Michael Harris

13 October 2018
15:00

Cambridge	24 – 43	Blackheath (1 BP)
	Report

Grantchester Road
Attendance: 503
Referee: James Clarke

13 October 2018
15:00

Cinderford	15 – 12	Plymouth Albion (1 BP)
	Report

Dockham Road
Attendance: 390
Referee: Nick Wood

13 October 2018
15:00

(2 BP) Darlington Mowden Park	29 – 31	Sale FC (1 BP)
	Report

Darlington Arena
Attendance: 897
Referee: Llyr ApGeraint-Roberts

13 October 2018
15:00

(1 BP) Rosslyn Park	27 – 22	Birmingham Moseley (2 BP)
	Report

The Rock
Attendance: 610
Referee: Jack Lewars

=== Round 8 ===
20 October 2018
14:00

(1 BP) Loughborough Students	39 – 27	Darlington Mowden Park (1 BP)
	Report

Loughborough University Stadium
Attendance: 440
Referee: Nick Wood

20 October 2018
15:00

(1 BP) Ampthill	54 – 10	Cinderford
	Report

Dillingham Park
Attendance: 433
Referee: Alexander Thomas

20 October 2018
15:00

(1 BP) Blackheath	30 – 26	Birmingham Moseley (1 BP)
	Report

Well Hall
Attendance: 427
Referee: Daniel Collins

20 October 2018
15:00

(1 BP) Cambridge	22 – 27	Caldy (1 BP)
	Report

Grantchester Road
Attendance: 410
Referee: Harry Walbaum

20 October 2018
15:00

Chinnor	20 – 20	Old Elthamians
	Report

Kingsey Road
Attendance: 456
Referee: Calum Howard

20 October 2018
15:00

Esher	15 – 45	Rotherham Titans (1 BP)
	Report

Molesey Road
Attendance: 465
Referee: Jack Lewars

20 October 2018
15:00

Plymouth Albion	23 – 19	Bishop's Stortford (1 BP)
	Report

Brickfields
Attendance: 873
Referee: Charles Gayther

20 October 2018
15:00

Sale FC	23 – 31	Rosslyn Park (1 BP)
	Report

Heywood Road
Attendance: 408
Referee: James O'Brien

=== Round 9 ===
27 October 2018
14:00

Old Elthamians	22 – 10	Esher
	Report

College Meadow
Attendance: 343
Referee: Robbie Bourke

27 October 2018
14:00

(1 BP) Rotherham Titans	25 – 14	Plymouth Albion
	Report

Clifton Lane
Attendance: 621
Referee: Joe James

27 October 2018
15:00

Birmingham Moseley	31 – 22	Sale FC
	Report

Billesley Common
Attendance: 615
Referee: Robert Teare

27 October 2018
15:00

Bishop's Stortford	10 – 29	Ampthill (1 BP)
	Report

Silver Leys
Attendance: 475
Referee: Philip Davis

27 October 2018
15:00

Caldy	17 – 25	Blackheath
	Report

Paton Field
Attendance: 298
Referee: Dan Parrott

27 October 2018
15:00

Cinderford	14 – 9	Cambridge (1 BP)
	Report

Dockham Road
Attendance: 187
Referee: Daniel Collins

27 October 2018
15:00

(1 BP) Darlington Mowden Park	21 – 23	Chinnor
	Report

Darlington Arena
Attendance: 855
Referee: Alexander Thomas

27 October 2018
15:00

(1 BP) Rosslyn Park	39 – 31	Loughborough Students (1 BP)
	Report

The Rock
Attendance: 627
Referee: Charles Gayther

=== Round 10 ===
3 November 2018
14:00

(1 BP) Blackheath	41 – 24	Sale FC
	Report

Well Hall
Attendance: 323
Referee: Jack Lewars

3 November 2018
14:00

(2 BP) Caldy	31 – 38	Cinderford (1 BP)
	Report

Paton Field
Attendance: 201
Referee: Llyr ApGeraint-Roberts

3 November 2018
14:00

Cambridge	23 – 22	Bishop's Stortford (1 BP)
	Report

Grantchester Road
Attendance: 612
Referee: Calum Howard

3 November 2018
14:00

Chinnor	33 – 33	Rosslyn Park (1 BP)
	Report

Kingsey Road
Attendance: 293
Referee: Dan Parrott

3 November 2018
14:15

Ampthill	22 – 8	Rotherham Titans
	Report

Dillingham Park
Attendance: 385
Referee: George Selwood

3 November 2018
15:00

(1 BP) Esher	24 – 25	Darlington Mowden Park
	Report

Molesey Road
Attendance: 300 (Note: The Rugby Paper give an attendance of 300 while Rugby Statbunker gives 100. Following discussion with Esher officials the Rugby Paper figure is the correct one.)
Referee: Jonathan Cook

3 November 2018
15:00

(1 BP) Loughborough Students	35 – 25	Birmingham Moseley
	Report

Loughborough University Stadium
Attendance: 358
Referee: James Clarke

3 November 2018
15:00

(1 BP) Plymouth Albion	15 – 19	Old Elthamians
	Report

Brickfields
Attendance: 1,003
Referee: Harry Walbaum

=== Round 11 ===
17 November 2018
14:00

Cinderford	22 – 22	Blackheath
	Report

Dockham Road
Attendance: 324
Referee: Dan Parrott

17 November 2018
14:00

Old Elthamians	13 – 13	Ampthill
	Report

College Meadow
Attendance: 343
Referee: Jack Lewars

17 November 2018
14:00

Rotherham Titans	14 – 25	Cambridge
	Report

Clifton Lane
Attendance: 644
Referee: Daniel Collins

17 November 2018
15:00

(2 BP) Birmingham Moseley	33 – 40	Chinnor (1 BP)
	Report

Billesley Common
Attendance: 671
Referee: Llyr ApGeraint-Roberts

17 November 2018
15:00

Bishop's Stortford	3 – 13	Caldy
	Report

Silver Leys
Attendance: 375
Referee: Jonathan Cook

17 November 2018
15:00

Darlington Mowden Park	22 – 19	Plymouth Albion (1 BP)
	Report

Darlington Arena
Attendance: 1,077
Referee: Calum Howard

17 November 2018
15:00

Rosslyn Park	17 – 25	Esher
	Report

The Rock
Attendance: 600
Referee: Jordan Way

17 November 2018
15:00

(1 BP) Sale FC	38 – 31	Loughborough Students (2 BP)
	Report

Heywood Road
Attendance: 478
Referee: Joe James

=== Round 12 ===
24 November 2018
14:00

(2 BP) Caldy	29 – 33	Rotherham Titans (1 BP)
	Report

Paton Field
Attendance: 352
Referee: James O'Brien

24 November 2018
14:00

Cinderford	0 – 11	Bishop's Stortford
	Report

Dockham Road
Attendance: 234
Referee: James Clarke

24 November 2018
14:00

(1 BP) Cambridge	17 – 20	Old Elthamians
	Report

Grantchester Road
Attendance: 483
Referee: Callum Howard

24 November 2018
14:00

(1 BP) Chinnor	28 – 21	Sale FC (1 BP)
	Report

Kingsey Road
Attendance: 297
Referee: Jonathan Cook

24 November 2018
14:15

(1 BP) Ampthill	40 – 29	Darlington Mowden Park (1 BP)
	Report

Dillingham Park
Attendance: 282
Referee: Charles Gayther

24 November 2018
15:00

(1 BP) Blackheath	39 – 32	Loughborough Students (2 BP)
	Report

Well Hall
Attendance: 237
Referee: Jack Lewars

24 November 2018
15:00

Esher	21 – 38	Birmingham Moseley (1 BP)
	Report

Molesey Road
Attendance: 300
Referee: Daniel Collins

24 November 2018
15:00

Plymouth Albion	21 – 35	Rosslyn Park (1 BP)
	Report

Brickfields
Attendance: 987
Referee: Ben Russell

=== Round 13 ===
1 December 2018
14:00

(1 BP) Old Elthamians	34 – 7	Caldy
	Report

College Meadow
Attendance: 133
Referee: Dan Parrott

1 December 2018
14:00

Rotherham Titans	20 – 3	Cinderford
	Report

Clifton Lane
Attendance: 607
Referee: Llyr ApGeraint-Roberts

1 December 2018
15:00

(1 BP) Bishop's Stortford	15 – 16	Blackheath
	Report

Silver Leys
Attendance: 406
Referee: Daniel Collins

1 December 2018
15:00

(1 BP) Birmingham Moseley	48 – 26	Plymouth Albion (1 BP)
	Report

Billesley Common
Attendance: 733
Referee: Fergus Kirby

1 December 2018
15:00

Darlington Mowden Park	3 – 22	Cambridge
	Report

Darlington Arena
Attendance: 765
Referee: Jack Lewars

1 December 2018
15:00

(1 BP) Loughborough Students	48 – 46	Chinnor (2 BP)
	Report

Loughborough University Stadium
Attendance: 324
Referee: Robert Bourke

1 December 2018
15:00

Rosslyn Park	10 – 6	Ampthill (1 BP)
	Report

The Rock
Attendance: 553
Referee: Aled Lewington

1 December 2018
15:00

(2 BP) Sale FC	38 – 44	Esher (1 BP)
	Report

Heywood Road
Attendance: 488
Referee: James O'Brien

=== Round 14 ===
8 December 2018
14:00

Ampthill	25 – 17	Birmingham Moseley
	Report

Dillingham Park
Attendance: 363
Referee: Joe James

8 December 2018
14:00

Caldy	14 – 8	Darlington Mowden Park (1 BP)
	Report

Paton Field
Attendance: 178
Referee: Timothy Allatt

8 December 2018
14:00

Cambridge	8 – 17	Rosslyn Park
	Report

Grantchester Road
Attendance: 512
Referee: Jonathan Cook

8 December 2018
14:00

Cinderford	12 – 32	Old Elthamians (1 BP)
	Report

Dockham Road
Attendance: 158
Referee: Benjamin Russell

8 December 2018
15:00

(1 BP) Bishop's Stortford	20 – 22	Rotherham Titans
	Report

Silver Leys
Attendance: 402
Referee: Robert Bourke

8 December 2018
15:00

Blackheath	22 – 14	Chinnor
	Report

Well Hall
Attendance: 546
Referee: James Clarke

8 December 2018
15:00

Esher	17 – 14	Loughborough Students (1 BP)
	Report

Molesey Road
Attendance: 350
Referee: Phillip Davies

8 December 2018
15:00

Plymouth Albion	14 – 7	Sale FC (1 BP)
	Report

Brickfields
Attendance: 871
Referee: Charles Gayther

=== Round 15 ===
15 December 2018
14:00

Chinnor	24 – 18	Esher (1 BP)
	Report

Kingsey Road
Attendance: 270
Referee: Nick Wood

15 December 2018
14:00

Old Elthamians	17 – 3	Bishop's Stortford
	Report

College Meadow
Attendance: 211
Referee: Veryan Boscawen

15 December 2018
14:00

Rotherham Titans	10 – 7	Blackheath (1 BP)
	Report

Clifton Lane
Attendance: 620
Referee: Harry Walbaum

15 December 2018
15:00

Birmingham Moseley	15 – 6	Cambridge
	Report

Billesley Common
Attendance: 540
Referee: Benjamin Russell

15 December 2018
15:00

Darlington Mowden Park	10 – 7	Cinderford (1 BP)
	Report

Darlington Arena
Attendance: 717
Referee: Joe Craggs

15 December 2018
15:00

Loughborough Students	6 – 34	Plymouth Albion (1 BP)
	Report

Loughborough University Stadium
Attendance: 153
Referee: Jonathan Cook

15 December 2018
15:00

(1 BP) Rosslyn Park	26 – 10	Caldy
	Report

The Rock
Attendance: 694
Referee: Calum Howard

15 December 2018
15:00

Sale FC	10 – 27	Ampthill (1 BP)
	Report

Heywood Road
Attendance: 558
Referee: Daniel Collins

=== Round 16 ===
22 December 2018
14:00

(1 BP) Ampthill	38 – 27	Chinnor (1 BP)
	Report

Dillingham Park
Attendance: 418
Referee: Harry Walbaum

22 December 2018
14:00

(1 BP) Caldy	20 – 23	Sale FC
	Report

Paton Field
Attendance: 567
Referee: Llyr ApGeraint-Roberts

22 December 2018
14:00

Cambridge	25 – 22	Loughborough Students (1 BP)
	Report

Grantchester Road
Attendance: 422
Referee: Andrew MacNeaney

22 December 2018
14:00

(1 BP) Cinderford	38 – 14	Birmingham Moseley
	Report

Dockham Road
Attendance: 374
Referee: Nick Wood

22 December 2018
14:00

(1 BP) Old Elthamians	11 – 12	Blackheath
	Report

College Meadow
Attendance: 1,770 (Note: The Rugby Paper give an attendance of 1,770 while Rugby Statbunker gives 400. Following discussion with the Old Elthamians chairman it turns out The Rugby Paper figure is correct.)
Referee: Alexander Thomas

22 December 2018
14:00

Rotherham Titans	25 – 13	Darlington Mowden Park
	Report

Clifton Lane
Attendance: 684
Referee: Dan Parrott

22 December 2018
15:00

(1 BP) Bishop's Stortford	25 – 27	Rosslyn Park
	Report

Silver Leys
Attendance: 604
Referee: Daniel Collins

22 December 2018
15:00

Plymouth Albion	19 – 16	Esher (1 BP)
	Report

Brickfields
Attendance: 1,261
Referee: Veryan Boscawen

=== Round 17 ===
5 January 2019
14:00

(1 BP) Chinnor	27 – 26	Cambridge (1 BP)
	Report

Kingsey Road
Attendance: 370
Referee: Joe James

5 January 2019
15:00

(1 BP) Birmingham Moseley	41 – 31	Bishop's Stortford (1 BP)
	Report

Billesley Common
Attendance: 651
Referee: Charles Gayther

5 January 2019
15:00

(2 BP) Blackheath	27 – 32	Plymouth Albion (1 BP)
	Report

Well Hall
Attendance: 724
Referee: Jonathan Cook

5 January 2019
15:00

(1 BP) Darlington Mowden Park	41 – 26	Old Elthamians (1 BP)
	Report

Darlington Arena
Attendance: 777
Referee: Llyr ApGeraint-Roberts

5 January 2019
15:00

(1 BP) Esher	49 – 48	Ampthill (2 BP)
	Report

Molesey Road
Attendance: 437
Referee: Dan Parrott

5 January 2019
15:00

(1 BP) Loughborough Students	53 – 19	Caldy
	Report

Loughborough University Stadium
Attendance: 176
Referee: Jack Lewars

5 January 2019
15:00

(1 BP) Rosslyn Park	46 – 24	Rotherham Titans
	Report

The Rock
Attendance: 695
Referee: James Clarke

5 January 2019
15:00

Sale FC	31 – 17	Cinderford
	Report

Heywood Road
Attendance: 422
Referee: Alexander Thomas

=== Round 18 ===
12 January 2019
14:00

(1 BP) Caldy	17 – 20	Chinnor
	Report

Paton Field
Attendance: 235
Referee: James O'Brien

12 January 2019
14:00

(1 BP) Cambridge	28 – 20	Esher
	Report

Grantchester Road
Attendance: 508
Referee: Harry Walbaum

12 January 2019
14:00

(1 BP) Cinderford	45 – 36	Loughborough Students (1 BP)
	Report

Dockham Road
Attendance: 202
Referee: Dan Parrott

12 January 2019
14:00

Old Elthamians	28 – 22	Rosslyn Park (1 BP)
	Report

College Meadow
Attendance: 669
Referee: Nick Wood

12 January 2019
14:00

Rotherham Titans	21 – 20	Birmingham Moseley (1 BP)
	Report

Clifton Lane
Attendance: 694
Referee: Alexander Thomas

12 January 2019
14:15

(1 BP) Ampthill	48 – 15	Plymouth Albion
	Report

Dillingham Park
Attendance: 365
Referee: James Clarke

12 January 2019
15:00

(1 BP) Bishop's Stortford	29 – 15	Sale FC
	Report

Silver Leys
Attendance: 302
Referee: Veryan Boscawen

12 January 2019
15:00

(1 BP) Darlington Mowden Park	24 – 29	Blackheath (1 BP)
	Report

Darlington Arena
Attendance: 884
Referee: Joe James

=== Round 19 ===
19 January 2019
14:00

(2 BP) Chinnor	27 – 29	Cinderford (1 BP)
	Report

Kingsey Road
Attendance: 408
Referee: Jonathan Cook

19 January 2019
15:00

(1 BP) Birmingham Moseley	10 – 14	Old Elthamians
	Report

Billesley Common
Attendance: 627
Referee: Harry Walbaum

19 January 2019
15:00

(2 BP) Blackheath	26 – 31	Ampthill (1 BP)
	Report

Well Hall
Attendance: 690
Referee: Alexander Thomas

19 January 2019
15:00

Esher	17 – 14	Caldy (1 BP)
	Report

Molesey Road
Attendance: 487 (Note: The Rugby Paper give an attendance of 487 while Rugby Statbunker gives 600. As 600 is higher than any attendance that Esher have got so far this season and Caldy are not a local team, The Rugby Paper figure will be used until more info can be gained.)
Referee: Jack Lewars

19 January 2019
15:00

(1 BP) Loughborough Students	26 – 41	Bishop's Stortford (1 BP)
	Report

Loughborough University Stadium
Attendance: 278
Referee: Calum Howard

19 January 2019
15:00

(1 BP) Plymouth Albion	29 – 17	Cambridge
	Report

Brickfields
Attendance: 651
Referee: Ben Russell

19 January 2019
15:00

(1 BP) Rosslyn Park	31 – 32	Darlington Mowden Park (1 BP)
	Report

The Rock
Attendance: 630
Referee: Daniel Collins

19 January 2019
15:00

Sale FC	13 – 12	Rotherham Titans (1 BP)
	Report

Heywood Road
Attendance: 632
Referee: Nick Wood

=== Round 20 ===
26 January 2019
14:00

Caldy	3 – 27	Plymouth Albion
	Report

Paton Field
Attendance: 268
Referee: Calum Howard

26 January 2019
14:00

Cambridge	11 – 22	Ampthill
	Report

Grantchester Road
Attendance: 561
Referee: Veryan Boscawen

26 January 2019
14:00

(1 BP) Cinderford	26 – 0	Esher
	Report

Dockham Road
Attendance: 165
Referee: Nick Wood

26 January 2019
14:00

(1 BP) Old Elthamians	32 – 14	Sale FC
	Report

College Meadow
Attendance: 313
Referee: Charles Gayther

26 January 2019
14:00

(1 BP) Rotherham Titans	23 – 29	Loughborough Students (1 BP)
	Report

Clifton Lane
Attendance: 582
Referee: John Meredith

26 January 2019
15:00

(1 BP) Bishop's Stortford	47 – 10	Chinnor
	Report

Silver Leys
Attendance: 478
Referee: Jack Sutton

26 January 2019
15:00

Darlington Mowden Park	17 – 17	Birmingham Moseley
	Report

Darlington Arena
Attendance: 794
Referee: Jack Lewars

26 January 2019
15:00

Rosslyn Park	28 – 22	Blackheath (1 BP)
	Report

The Rock
Attendance: 902
Referee: Fergus Kirby

=== Round 21 ===
2 February 2019
14:00

(2 BP) Blackheath	22 – 27	Cambridge
	Report

Well Hall Ground
Attendance: 453
Referee: Nick Wood

2 February 2019
14:00

Chinnor	P – P	Rotherham Titans

Kingsey Road

- Postponed due to poor weather (snow). Game to be rescheduled for 23 February 2019.

2 February 2019
14:15

Ampthill	P – P	Caldy

Dillingham Park

- Postponed due to poor weather (snow). Game to be rescheduled for 23 February 2019.

2 February 2019
15:00

Birmingham Moseley	P – P	Rosslyn Park

Billesley Common

- Postponed due to poor weather (snow). Game to be rescheduled for 23 February 2019.

2 February 2019
15:00

Esher	14 – 27	Bishop's Stortford (1 BP)
	Report

Molesey Road
Attendance: 476
Referee: Charles Gayther

2 February 2019
15:00

(1 BP) Loughborough Students	26 – 69	Old Elthamians (1 BP)
	Report

Loughborough University Stadium
Attendance: 345
Referee: James Clarke

2 February 2019
15:00

Plymouth Albion	21 – 10	Cinderford
	Report

Brickfields
Attendance: 1,069
Referee: Ben Russell

2 February 2019
15:00

Sale FC	P – P	Darlington Mowden Park

Heywood Road

- Postponed due to poor weather (snow). Game to be rescheduled for 23 February 2019.

=== Round 22 ===
9 February 2019
14:00

Caldy	15 – 12	Cambridge (1 BP)
	Report

Paton Field
Attendance: 156
Referee: Joe James

9 February 2019
14:00

(1 BP) Cinderford	20 – 26	Ampthill (1 BP)
	Report

Dockham Road
Attendance: 204
Referee: Neil Chivers

9 February 2019
14:00

(1 BP) Old Elthamians	22 – 3	Chinnor
	Report

College Meadow
Attendance: 292
Referee: Ben Russell

9 February 2019
15:00

Birmingham Moseley	17 – 27	Blackheath (1 BP)
	Report

Billesley Common
Attendance: 663 (Note: The Rugby Paper give an attendance of 663 while Rugby Statbunker gives 660. As 660 is a round figure, the 663 figure from The Rugby Paper will be used.)
Referee: Michael Hudson

9 February 2019
15:00

(1 BP) Bishop's Stortford	57 – 24	Plymouth Albion (1 BP)
	Report

Silver Leys
Attendance: 428
Referee: Phillip Davies

9 February 2019
15:00

(1 BP) Darlington Mowden Park	47 – 30	Loughborough Students (1 BP)
	Report

Darlington Arena
Attendance: 813 (Note: The Rugby Paper give an attendance of 813 while Rugby Statbunker gives 811. Although it is a small discrepancy, The Rugby Paper will be used as it has become more accurate in its reporting of attendance figures.)
Referee: Calum Howard

9 February 2019
15:00

(1 BP) Rosslyn Park	31 – 26	Sale FC (2 BP)
	Report

The Rock
Attendance: 610
Referee: Daniel Collins

9 February 2019
15:00

(1 BP) Rotherham Titans	22 – 12	Esher
	Report

Clifton Lane
Attendance: 534
Referee: Harry Walbaum

=== Round 23 ===
16 February 2019
14:00

Cambridge	10 – 6	Cinderford (1 BP)
	Report

Grantchester Road
Attendance: 457
Referee: Jack Lewars

16 February 2019
14:00

(2 BP) Chinnor	26 – 31	Darlington Mowden Park (1 BP)
	Report

Kingsey Road
Attendance: 325
Referee: Nick Wood

16 February 2019
14:15

(1 BP) Ampthill	34 – 24	Bishop's Stortford
	Report

Dillingham Park
Attendance: 375
Referee: Jonathan Cook

16 February 2019
15:00

(1 BP) Blackheath	46 – 30	Caldy (1 BP)
	Report

Well Hall Ground
Attendance: 492
Referee: Daniel Collins

16 February 2019
15:00

Esher	17 – 34	Old Elthamians (1 BP)
	Report

Molesey Road
Attendance: 809
Referee: Richard Haughton

16 February 2019
15:00

Loughborough Students	20 – 46	Rosslyn Park (1 BP)
	Report

Loughborough University Stadium
Attendance: 289
Referee: Alexander Thomas

16 February 2019
15:00

Plymouth Albion	24 – 17	Rotherham Titans (1 BP)
	Report

Brickfields
Attendance: 1,100
Referee: Veryan Boscawen

16 February 2019
15:00

(1 BP) Sale FC	37 – 30	Birmingham Moseley (1 BP)
	Report

Heywood Road
Attendance: 508
Referee: Calum Howard

=== Round 21 (rescheduled games) ===
23 February 2019
14:15

(1 BP) Ampthill	59 – 7	Caldy
	Report

Dillingham Park
Attendance: 265
Referee: Philip Davies

- Game rescheduled from 2 February 2019.

23 February 2019
14:30

(1 BP) Chinnor	48 – 35	Rotherham Titans (1 BP)
	Report

Kingsey Road
Attendance: 306
Referee: Matt Carley

- Game rescheduled from 2 February 2019

23 February 2019
15:00

(1 BP) Birmingham Moseley	27 – 45	Rosslyn Park (1 BP)
	Report

Billesley Common
Attendance: 442
Referee: George Selwood

- Game rescheduled from 2 February 2019.

23 February 2019
15:00

(1 BP) Sale FC	32 – 27	Darlington Mowden Park (2 BP)
	Report

Heywood Road
Attendance: 314
Referee: Charles Gayther

- Game rescheduled from 2 February 2019.

=== Round 24 ===
2 March 2019
14:00

(1 BP) Rotherham Titans	24 – 36	Ampthill (1 BP)
	Report

Clifton Lane
Attendance: 504
Referee: Nick Wood

2 March 2019
14:30

(1 BP) Old Elthamians	40 – 29	Plymouth Albion (1 BP)
	Report

College Meadow
Attendance: 313
Referee: James Clarke

2 March 2019
15:00

(1 BP) Birmingham Moseley	30 – 29	Loughborough Students (2 BP)
	Report

Billesley Common
Attendance: 651
Referee: Benjamin Russell

2 March 2019
15:00

Bishop's Stortford	24 – 6	Cambridge
	Report

Silver Leys
Attendance: 837
Referee: Alexander Thomas

2 March 2019
15:00

(1 BP) Cinderford	27 – 25	Caldy (2 BP)
	Report

Dockham Road
Attendance: 278
Referee: Veryan Boscawen

2 March 2019
15:00

Darlington Mowden Park	24 – 17	Esher (1 BP)
	Report

Northern Echo Arena
Attendance: 844
Referee: James O'Brien

2 March 2019
15:00

(1 BP) Rosslyn Park	38 – 31	Chinnor (2 BP)
	Report

The Rock
Attendance: 678
Referee: Jonathan Cook

2 March 2019
15:00

Sale FC	18 – 32	Blackheath (1 BP)
	Report

Heywood Road
Attendance: 341
Referee: Llyr ApGeraint-Roberts

=== Round 25 ===
9 March 2019
15:00

(1 BP) Ampthill	36 – 6	Old Elthamians
	Report

Dillingham Park
Attendance: 975
Referee: Alexander Thomas

9 March 2019
15:00

(1 BP) Blackheath	31 – 7	Cinderford
	Report

Well Hall
Attendance: 307
Referee: Philip Davies

9 March 2019
15:00

(1 BP) Caldy	14 – 16	Bishop's Stortford
	Report

Paton Field
Attendance: 231
Referee: Charles Gayther

9 March 2019
15:00

(1 BP) Cambridge	20 – 24	Rotherham Titans (1 BP)
	Report

Grantchester Road
Attendance: 530
Referee: Richard Haughton

9 March 2019
15:00

Chinnor	7 – 41	Birmingham Moseley (1 BP)
	Report

Kingsey Road
Attendance: 455
Referee: Veryan Boscawen

9 March 2019
15:00

(1 BP) Esher	13 – 17	Rosslyn Park
	Report

Molesey Road
Attendance: 567
Referee: Jack Lewars

9 March 2019
15:00

(1 BP) Loughborough Students	33 – 17	Sale FC
	Report

Loughborough University Stadium
Attendance: 227
Referee: Dan Parrott

9 March 2019
15:00

(1 BP) Plymouth Albion	42 – 29	Darlington Mowden Park (1 BP)
	Report

Brickfields
Attendance: 784
Referee: Calum Howard

=== Round 26 ===
23 March 2019
14:00

Loughborough Students	19 – 53	Blackheath (1 BP)
	Report

Loughborough University Stadium
Attendance: 361
Referee: James Clarke

23 March 2019
14:00

(1 BP) Rotherham Titans	29 – 5	Caldy
	Report

Clifton Lane
Attendance: 696
Referee: John Meredith

23 March 2019
14:30

(1 BP) Old Elthamians	31 – 3	Cambridge
	Report

College Meadow
Attendance: 311
Referee: Fergus Kirby

23 March 2019
15:00

(1 BP) Birmingham Moseley	29 – 27	Esher (2 BP)
	Report

Billesley Common
Attendance: 730
Referee: Nick Wood

23 March 2019
15:00

(1 BP) Bishop's Stortford	37 – 17	Cinderford
	Report

Silver Leys
Attendance: 813
Referee: Veryan Boscawen

23 March 2019
15:00

(2 BP) Darlington Mowden Park	26 – 33	Ampthill (1 BP)
	Report

Northern Echo Arena
Attendance: 823 (Note: The Rugby Paper give an attendance of 823 while Rugby Statbunker gives 780. From looking at the match report on the Darlington Mowden Park RFC website it seems the correct figure was the one in The Rugby Paper.)
Referee: Charles Gayther

23 March 2019
15:00

Rosslyn Park	22 – 17	Plymouth Albion (1 BP)
	Report

The Rock
Attendance: 690
Referee: Joe James

23 March 2019
15:00

(1 BP) Sale FC	31 – 22	Chinnor
	Report

Heywood Road
Attendance: 687
Referee: Alexander Thomas

=== Round 27 ===
30 March 2019
15:00

Ampthill	21 – 20	Rosslyn Park (1 BP)
	Report

Dillingham Park
Attendance: 982
Referee: Calum Howard

30 March 2019
15:00

Blackheath	12 – 21	Bishop's Stortford
	Report

Well Hall
Attendance: 627
Referee: Jonathan Cook

30 March 2019
15:00

Caldy	9 – 40	Old Elthamians (1 BP)
	Report

Paton Field
Attendance: 254
Referee: Neil Chivers

30 March 2019
15:00

(1 BP) Cambridge	29 – 15	Darlington Mowden Park
	Report

Grantchester Road
Attendance: 438
Referee: Jack Lewars

30 March 2019
15:00

(1 BP) Chinnor	29 – 50	Loughborough Students (1 BP)
	Report

Kingsey Road
Attendance: 301
Referee: Harry Walbaum

30 March 2019
15:00

(1 BP) Cinderford	36 – 19	Rotherham Titans
	Report

Dockham Road
Attendance: 360
Referee: James O'Brien

30 March 2019
15:00

(1 BP) Esher	31 – 29	Sale FC (2 BP)
	Report

Molesey Road
Attendance: 573
Referee: Veryan Boscawen

30 March 2019
15:00

(1 BP) Plymouth Albion	54 – 28	Birmingham Moseley (1 BP)
	Report

Brickfields
Attendance: 3,556
Referee: Ben Russell

=== Round 28 ===
6 April 2019
15:00

(1 BP) Birmingham Moseley	26 – 40	Ampthill (1 BP)
	Report

Billesley Common
Attendance: 798
Referee: James Clarke

6 April 2019
15:00

Chinnor	23 – 33	Blackheath (1 BP)
	Report

Kingsey Road
Attendance: 405
Referee: Nick Wood

6 April 2019
15:00

Darlington Mowden Park	14 – 22	Caldy
	Report

Northern Echo Arena
Attendance: 855
Referee: Alexander Thomas

6 April 2019
15:00

(1 BP) Loughborough Students	43 – 29	Esher (1 BP)
	Report

Loughborough University Stadium
Attendance: 312 (Note: The Rugby Paper give an attendance of 312 while Rugby Statbunker gives 213. The Rugby Paper will be used as the Rugby Statbunker figure was released several weeks later and may well be a mistype.)
Referee: Calum Howard

6 April 2019
15:00

Old Elthamians	22 – 17	Cinderford (1 BP)
	Report

College Meadow
Attendance: 298
Referee: Ben Russell

6 April 2019
15:00

(1 BP) Rosslyn Park	37 – 28	Cambridge (1 BP)
	Report

The Rock
Attendance: 680
Referee: Jonathan Cook

6 April 2019
15:00

(1 BP) Rotherham Titans	41 – 35	Bishop's Stortford (2 BP)
	Report

Clifton Lane
Attendance: 547
Referee: Jack Lewars

6 April 2019
15:00

(1 BP) Sale FC	31 – 22	Plymouth Albion (1 BP)
	Report

Heywood Road
Attendance: 472
Referee: Charlie Gayther

=== Round 29 ===
13 April 2019
15:00

(1 BP) Ampthill	57 – 12	Sale FC

Dillingham Park
Attendance: 882
Referee: James Clarke

13 April 2019
15:00

Bishop's Stortford	19 – 28	Old Elthamians (1 BP)

Silver Leys
Attendance: 860
Referee: Joe James

13 April 2019
15:00

(1 BP) Blackheath	28 – 7	Rotherham Titans

Well Hall
Attendance: 673
Referee: Richard Haughton

13 April 2019
15:00

(1 BP) Caldy	31 – 20	Rosslyn Park

Paton Field
Attendance: 423
Referee: Llyr ApGeraint-Roberts

13 April 2019
15:00

(1 BP) Cambridge	21 – 22	Birmingham Moseley

Grantchester Road
Attendance: 703
Referee: Philip Davies

13 April 2019
15:00

(1 BP) Cinderford	29 – 26	Darlington Mowden Park (2 BP)

Dockham Road
Attendance: 365
Referee: James O'Brien

13 April 2019
15:00

(1 BP) Esher	34 – 29	Chinnor (2 BP)

Molesey Road
Attendance: 350
Referee: Daniel Collins

13 April 2019
15:00

(1 BP) Plymouth Albion	26 – 20	Loughborough Students (1 BP)

Brickfields
Attendance: 1,522
Referee: Dan Parrott

=== Round 30 ===
27 April 2019
15:00

Birmingham Moseley	12 – 10	Caldy (1 BP)

Billesley Common
Attendance: 1,053
Referee: James Clarke

- Caldy are relegated.

27 April 2019
15:00

(2 BP) Blackheath	22 – 24	Esher (1 BP)

Well Hall
Attendance: 1,113
Referee: Benjamin Wilde

- Esher are relegated.

27 April 2019
15:00

(1 BP) Chinnor	10 – 17	Plymouth Albion

Kingsey Road
Attendance: 418
Referee: Adam Wookey

27 April 2019
15:00

(1 BP) Darlington Mowden Park	34 – 26	Bishop's Stortford (1 BP)

Northern Echo Arena
Attendance: 1,372
Referee: Ben Rayner

27 April 2019
15:00

Loughborough Students	20 – 52	Ampthill (1 BP)

Loughborough University Stadium
Attendance: 657
Referee: Nick Wood

- Ampthill are champions. Loughborough Students are relegated.

27 April 2019
15:00

(1 BP) Old Elthamians	31 – 12	Rotherham Titans

College Meadow
Attendance: 327
Referee: Veryan Boscawen

27 April 2019
15:00

(1 BP) Rosslyn Park	50 – 19	Cinderford

The Rock
Attendance: 624
Referee: Andrew MacNeaney

27 April 2019
15:00

Sale FC	5 – 24	Cambridge (1 BP)

Heywood Road
Attendance: 412
Referee: Dan Parrott

== Attendances ==
Club	Home games	Total	Average	Highest	Lowest	% Capacity
Ampthill	15	7,267	484	982	265	16%
Birmingham Moseley	15	10,137	676	1,053	442	14%
Bishop's Stortford	15	8,376	558	860	302	35%
Blackheath	15	8,501	567	1,113	237	34%
Caldy	15	4,778	319	567	156	8%
Cambridge	15	7,335	489	703	381	22%
Chinnor	15	5,699	380	539	270	19%
Cinderford	15	4,411	294	539	158	12%
Darlington Mowden Park	15	13,305	887	1,372	717	3%
Esher	15	6,744	450	809	299	13%
Loughborough Students	15	5,180	345	712	153	12%
Old Elthamians	15	6,610	441	1,770	133	24%
Plymouth Albion	15	16,739	1,116	3,556	558	13%
Rosslyn Park	15	9,739	649	902	553	32%
Rotherham Titans	15	8,976	598	696	504	24%
Sale FC	15	7,347	490	687	314	14%

== Individual statistics ==
- Note that points scorers includes tries as well as conversions, penalties and drop goals. Appearance figures also include coming on as substitutes (unused substitutes not included).

=== Top points scorers ===
Rank	Player	Team	Appearances	Points
1	(England) Tom White	Old Elthamians	30	270
2	(England) James Williams	Birmingham Moseley	26	266
3	(Australia) Alex Dolly	Rotherham Titans	26	203
4	(England) Gregory Lound	Rosslyn Park	24	192
5	(England) Ben Jones	Caldy	30	187
6	(South Africa) Warren Seals	Darlington Mowden Park	23	180
7	(England) Charlie Reed	Loughborough Students	28	179
7	(England) Craig Holland	Chinnor	30	179
8	(England) Thomas Banks	Bishop's Stortford	24	156
9	(England) Ben Penfold	Cambridge	22	155

=== Top try scorers ===
Rank	Player	Team	Appearances	Tries
1	(England) Craig Holland	Chinnor	30	25
2	(England) Seb Nagle-Taylor	Rotherham Titans	30	21
3	(England) Nick Royle	Caldy	29	20
3	(England) Jake Lloyd	Blackheath	30	20
4	(England) Nigel Baker	Ampthill	29	19
5	(England) Joss Linney	Bishop's Stortford	18	15
5	(Guyana) Dominic Lespierre	Old Elthamians	25	15
5	(England) Spencer Sutherland	Ampthill	26	15
6	(Tonga) Aleki Lutui	Ampthill	23	14
7	(England) Ben Marfo	Rosslyn Park	18	13

== Season records ==
=== Team ===
Largest home win — 52 points

59 – 7 Ampthill at home to Caldy on 23 February 2019

Largest away win — 40 points

69 – 29 Old Elthamians away to Loughborough Students on 2 February 2019

Most points scored — 69 points

69 – 29 Old Elthamians away to Loughborough Students on 2 February 2019

Most tries in a match — 10

Old Elthamians away to Loughborough Students on 2 February 2019

Most conversions in a match — 8

Old Elthamians away to Loughborough Students on 2 February 2019

Most penalties in a match — 8

Rotherham Titans at home to Rosslyn Park on 15 September 2018

Most drop goals in a match — 1 (5)

Esher away to Bishop's Stortford on 13 October 2018
Sale FC at home to Rosslyn Park on 20 October 2018
Birmingham Moseley at home to Cambridge on 15 December 2018
Darlington Mowden Park at home to Cinderford on 15 December 2018
Sale FC away to Esher on 30 March 2019

=== Attendances ===
Highest — 3,556

Plymouth Albion at home to Birmingham Moseley on 30 March 2019

Lowest — 133

Old Elthamians at home to Caldy on 1 December 2018

Highest average attendance — 1,116

Plymouth Albion

Lowest average attendance — 294

Cinderford

=== Player ===
Most points in a match — 26

(England) James Williams for Birmingham Moseley at home to Sale FC on 27 October 2018

Most tries in a match — 4

(England) Adam Caves for Birmingham Moseley at home to Rotherham Titans on 22 September 2018

Most conversions in a match — 8

(England) Tom White for Old Elthamians away to Loughborough Students on 2 February 2019

Most penalties in a match — 8

(Australia) Alex Dolly for Rotherham Titans at home to Rosslyn Park on 15 September 2018

Most drop goals in a match — 1 (5)

(England) Owen Waters for Esher away to Bishop's Stortford on 13 October 2018
(England) Chris Johnson for Sale FC at home to Rosslyn Park on 20 October 2018
(England) Sam Hollingsworth for Birmingham Moseley at home to Cambridge on 15 December 2018
(South Africa) Warren Seals for Darlington Mowden Park at home to Cinderford on 15 December 2018
(Spain) Emiliano Calle Rivas for Sale FC away to Esher on 30 March 2019

== See also ==
- English rugby union system
- Rugby union in England
