= Anita de St. Quentin =

French figure skater

Personal information
- Born: Anita Louise White; 13 November 1901 Moffat, Scotland

Figure skating career
- Country: France

Anita Louise de St. Quentin (née White; born 13 November 1901, date of death unknown) was a Scottish-French figure skater who represented France at the 1928 Winter Olympics.

== Biography ==
White was born in Moffat, Dumfriesshire, to Scottish father Thomas Brown White, a former rugby player and general practitioner, and Isabelle Constance Mégret, a native of Paris. She married a French count named Christian de St. Quentin in 1923 in Paris, and moved to Nice. She represented France when she competed in the women's singles event at the 1928 Winter Olympics. She finished last in points, with a record low score, and retired from the sport after the event.
