= 2019–20 National League 2 South =

Rugby union competition in England

- Countries: England
- Date: 7 September 2019 – 14 March 2020
- Champions: Taunton Titans (1st title)
- Runners-up: Tonbridge Juddians (also promoted)
- Relegated: Bournemouth, Old Redcliffians, Sutton & Epsom
- Matches played: 196
- Attendance: 60,934 (average 311 per match)
- Highest attendance: 1,076; Dings Crusaders v Clifton; 14 September 2019
- Lowest attendance: 0 (Note: Tonbridge Juddians home game against Sutton & Epsom on 21 December 2019 was a closed game due to flooding making it unsafe for spectators.); Tonbridge Juddians v Sutton & Epsom; 21 December 2019
- Top point scorer: (England) Gary Kingdom (Taunton Titans); 230 points
- Top try scorer: (England) Hugo Watson (Tonbridge Juddians); 22 tries

The 2019–20 National League 2 South was the eleventh season (33rd overall) of the fourth tier (south) of the English domestic rugby union competitions since the professionalised format of the second division was introduced.

Due to the COVID-19 pandemic in the United Kingdom, the Rugby Football Union officially cancelled the season on 20 March 2020, after an initial postponement of all rugby in England including training. After the cancellation was announced the RFU used a best playing record formula to decide the final table. This meant that Taunton Titans, who were 3 points clear when the league was suspended, were promoted as champions along with runners up Tonbridge Juddians, who went up as the best runner up as they had more considerably more points than 2019–20 National League 2 North runner up Fylde.

The relegated teams included Bournemouth, Old Redcliffians and Sutton & Epsom, all of whom had occupied the bottom three spots before league suspension, with 14th placed Sutton & Epsom 13 points behind 13th placed Westcliff and safety. Taunton Titans and Tonbridge Juddians will join the 2021–22 National League 1 (the highest level either club have reached), while Bournemouth and Old Redcliffians drop down to South West Premier and Sutton & Epsom to London & South East Premier.

Other interesting news from the season was Taunton's Gary Kingdom who finished as top scorer in the division for the third time, tying him with Worthing Raiders prolific Matthew McLean. An unwanted record was also made with Tonbridge Juddians official attendance of 0 from their game Sutton & Epsom on 21 December 2019 being the lowest ever recorded in a National League 2 South game. This was due to the game being played behind closed doors due to safety concerns caused by flooding.

== Structure ==
The league consists of sixteen teams with all the teams playing each other on a home and away basis to make a total of thirty matches each. There is one automatic promotion place, one play-off place and three relegation places. The champions are promoted to the 2020–21 National League 1 and the runners-up play the second-placed team in the 2019–20 National League 2 North with the winner being promoted. The last three teams are relegated to either London & South East Premier or South West Premier depending on the geographical location of the team (in some cases teams may join the Midlands regional leagues).

The results of the matches contribute points to the league as follows:

- 4 points are awarded for a win
- 2 points are awarded for a draw
- 0 points are awarded for a loss, however
- 1 losing (bonus) point is awarded to a team that loses a match by 7 points or fewer
- 1 additional (bonus) point is awarded to a team scoring 4 tries or more in a match.

== Participating teams and locations ==
Locations of the 2019–20 National League 2 South teams

Eleven of the teams listed below participated in the 2018–19 National League 2 South season. The 2018–19 champions Rams and play-off winners Canterbury, who won the promotion play-off against Chester, were promoted into the 2019–20 National League 1, while Esher were relegated into the division from the 2018–19 National League 1. Sides relegated from the 2018–19 National League 2 South included Birmingham & Solihull (to Greater Birmingham Merit Leagues), Guernsey (London & South East Premier) and London Irish Wild Geese (South West Premier). In the case of Birmingham & Solihull, they had initially been supposed to drop to Midlands Premier but on further reflection decided to become an amateur club and drop out of the league system.

The promoted teams are Bournemouth who come up as champions of South West Premier while Sutton & Epsom (champions) and Westcliff (play-off) came up from London & South East Premier. Leicester Lions were level transferred into the division from National League 2 North in order to address an imbalance of teams in National 2, with Rams and Canterbury being promoted and only Esher dropping down from National League 1. Although there were several candidates for the level-transfer in the end Leicester Lions were deemed the most suitable due to being the most southerly club in a central position, making access to both the south-east and south-west more straightforward than alternatives such as Luctonians.

| Team | Stadium | Capacity | City/Area | Previous season |
|---|---|---|---|---|
| Barnes | Barn Elms | 500 | Barnes, London | 11th |
| Bournemouth | Chapel Gate | 1,500 | Bournemouth, Dorset | Promoted from South West Premier (champions) |
| Bury St Edmunds | The Haberden | 3,000 (135 seats) | Bury St Edmunds, Suffolk | 8th |
| Clifton | Station Road | 2,200 (200 seats) | Cribbs Causeway, Patchway, Bristol | 6th |
| Dings Crusaders | Shaftsbury Park | 2,250 (250 seats) | Frenchay, Bristol | 13th |
| Esher | Molesey Road | 3,500 | Hersham, Surrey | Relegated from National 1 (15th) |
| Henley Hawks | Dry Leas | 4,000 | Henley-on-Thames, Oxfordshire | 4th |
| Leicester Lions | Westleigh Park | 2,000 | Blaby, Leicestershire | Level-transfer from National 2 North (12th) |
| Old Albanian | Woollam's Playing Fields | 1,000 | St Albans, Hertfordshire | 10th |
| Old Redcliffians | Scotland Lane | 1,000 | Brislington, Bristol | 12th |
| Redruth | The Recreation Ground | 3,500 (580 seats) | Redruth, Cornwall | 7th |
| Sutton & Epsom | Rugby Lane | | Cheam, London | Promoted from London & South East Premier (champions) |
| Taunton Titans | Towergate Stadium | 2,000 (198 seats) | Taunton, Somerset | 5th |
| Tonbridge Juddians | The Slade | 1,500 | Tonbridge, Kent | 3rd |
| Westcliff | The Gables | 1,000 | Eastwood, Essex | Promoted from London & South East Premier (play-off) |
| Worthing Raiders | Roundstone Lane | 1,500 (100 seats) | Angmering, West Sussex | 9th |

== Tables ==
At the date the leagues were suspended, the National League 2 South table read as follows:

2019–20 National League 2 South Table (to the date when play stopped due to COVID-19)
| Pos | Team | Pld | W | D | L | PF | PA | PD | TB | LB | Pts |
|---|---|---|---|---|---|---|---|---|---|---|---|
| 1 | Taunton Titans (C) | 25 | 20 | 0 | 5 | 815 | 521 | +294 | 17 | 4 | 101 |
| 2 | Tonbridge Juddians (P) | 25 | 21 | 0 | 4 | 810 | 366 | +444 | 13 | 1 | 98 |
| 3 | Redruth | 25 | 20 | 1 | 4 | 620 | 375 | +245 | 11 | 3 | 96 |
| 4 | Henley Hawks | 25 | 19 | 1 | 5 | 761 | 424 | +337 | 15 | 2 | 95 |
| 5 | Clifton | 25 | 16 | 0 | 9 | 703 | 552 | +151 | 15 | 4 | 83 |
| 6 | Bury St Edmunds | 24 | 15 | 0 | 9 | 660 | 489 | +171 | 12 | 6 | 78 |
| 7 | Leicester Lions | 24 | 16 | 0 | 8 | 520 | 374 | +146 | 7 | 5 | 76 |
| 8 | Esher | 24 | 13 | 1 | 10 | 609 | 530 | +79 | 11 | 5 | 70 |
| 9 | Worthing Raiders | 24 | 11 | 0 | 13 | 582 | 726 | −144 | 12 | 4 | 60 |
| 10 | Old Albanian | 25 | 9 | 0 | 16 | 585 | 567 | +18 | 11 | 10 | 57 |
| 11 | Dings Crusaders | 24 | 9 | 0 | 15 | 548 | 647 | −99 | 11 | 5 | 52 |
| 12 | Barnes | 25 | 8 | 0 | 17 | 533 | 719 | −186 | 9 | 5 | 46 |
| 13 | Westcliff | 25 | 6 | 1 | 18 | 446 | 735 | −289 | 5 | 8 | 39 |
| 14 | Sutton & Epsom (R) | 24 | 4 | 1 | 19 | 395 | 831 | −436 | 5 | 3 | 26 |
| 15 | Old Redcliffians (R) | 23 | 3 | 2 | 18 | 329 | 648 | −319 | 3 | 4 | 23 |
| 16 | Bournemouth (R) | 25 | 2 | 1 | 22 | 441 | 852 | −411 | 2 | 6 | 18 |

Updated to match(es) played on 14 March 2020. Source: "National League 2 South". NCA Rugby.
Rules for classification: If teams are level at any stage, tiebreakers are applied in the following order:
1. Number of matches won
2. Difference between points for and against
3. Total number of points for
4. Aggregate number of points scored in matches between tied teams
5. Number of matches won excluding the first match, then the second and so on until the tie is settled

On 4 April, the Rugby Football Union confirmed the final table for the season.

Final positions (with adjusted points)
| Pos | Team | Pts^{*} | Promotion or relegation |
|---|---|---|---|
| 1 | Taunton Titans (C) | 122.02 | Promotion place |
| 2 | Tonbridge (P) (Note: Due to the COVID-19 pandemic in the United Kingdom the promotion playoff game between the runners up of National League 2 South and the 2019–20 National League 2 North was cancelled and the winners were determined on final points tally. Tonbridge Juddians with 117.02 points were promoted ahead of Fylde with 107.88.) | 117.02 | Promotion place |
| 3 | Redruth | 114.90 | |
| 4 | Henley Hawks | 113.75 | |
| 5 | Clifton | 99.52 | |
| 6 | Bury St Edmunds | 97.50 | |
| 7 | Leicester Lions | 95.66 | |
| 8 | Esher | 90.00 | |
| 9 | Worthing Raiders | 75.10 | |
| 10 | Old Albanian | 68.17 | |
| 11 | Dings Crusaders | 65.00 | |
| 12 | Barnes | 55.29 | |
| 13 | Westcliff | 46.44 | |
| 14 | Sutton & Epsom (R) | 31.89 | Relegation place |
| 15 | Old Redcliffians (R) | 31.38 | Relegation place |
| 16 | Bournemouth (R) | 22.12 | Relegation place |

Updated to match(es) played on 4 April 2020. Source: "National League 2 South" (PDF). England Rugby.

== Fixture & Results ==
=== Round 1 ===
7 September 2019
14:30

| (1 BP) Clifton | 34 – 31 | Barnes (2 BP) |
| | Report |

Station Road
Attendance: 221
Referee: Philip Hallsworth

7 September 2019
15:00

| (1 BP) Henley Hawks | 46 – 5 | Sutton & Epsom |
| | Report |

Dry Leas
Attendance: 325
Referee: Hamish Grant

7 September 2019
15:00

| (1 BP) Old Albanian | 38 – 19 | Bury St Edmunds |
| | Report |

Woollam's Playing Fields
Attendance: 320
Referee: Andrew MacNeaney

7 September 2019
15:00

| Redruth | 10 – 8 | Esher (1 BP) |
| | Report |

Recreation Ground
Attendance: 535 (Note: Rugby Statbunker gives an attendance of 505 for the Redruth v Esher game on 7 September 2019, while The Rugby Paper give a figure of 535. The Rugby Paper figure is correct as it is backed up by Redruth RFC official match report.)
Referee: James Milliner-Woodcock

7 September 2019
15:00

| (1 BP) Taunton Titans | 49 – 12 | Bournemouth |
| | Report |

Towergate Stadium
Attendance: 400
Referee: Adam Wookey

7 September 2019
15:00

| (1 BP) Tonbridge Juddians | 41 – 12 | Leicester Lions |
| | Report |

The Slade
Attendance: 170
Referee: Richard Haughton

7 September 2019
15:00

| (2 BP) Westcliff | 24 – 25 | Dings Crusaders |
| | Report |

The Gables
Attendance: 200
Referee: Jack Sutton

7 September 2019
15:00

| Worthing Raiders | 27 – 20 | Old Redcliffians (1 BP) |
| | Report |

Roundstone Lane
Attendance: 481
Referee: Alan Chandrachud

=== Round 2 ===
14 September 2019
14:00

| (1 BP) Leicester Lions | 38 – 7 | Old Albanian |
| | Report |

Westleigh Park
Attendance: 158
Referee: Carl Adams

14 September 2019
15:00

| (1 BP) Barnes | 34 – 61 | Esher (1 BP) |
| | Report |

Barn Elms
Attendance: 181
Referee: Ben Wilde

14 September 2019
15:00

| Bournemouth | 24 – 37 | Worthing Raiders (1 BP) |
| | Report |

Chapel Gate
Attendance: 363
Referee: James Milliner-Woodcock

14 September 2019
15:00

| (1 BP) Bury St Edmunds | 53 – 17 | Westcliff |
| | Report |

The Haberden
Attendance: 431
Referee: Matt Sharpe

14 September 2019
15:00

| Dings Crusaders | 10 – 33 | Clifton |
| | Report |

Shaftesbury Park
Attendance: 1,076 (Note: Rugby Statbunker gives an attendance of just 426 for Dings Crusaders v Clifton on 14 September 2019, while The Rugby Paper give a figure of 1,076. The Rugby Paper figure is correct as it is backed up by Dings Crusaders official match report.)
Referee: Adam Wookey

14 September 2019
15:00

| Old Redcliffians | 0 – 50 | Henley Hawks (1 BP) |
| | Report |

Scotland Lane
Attendance: 126
Referee: Ieuan Davies

14 September 2019
15:00

| Sutton & Epsom | 14 – 74 | Tonbridge Juddians (1 BP) |
| | Report |

Rugby Lane
Attendance: 280
Referee: Luke Davies

14 September 2019
15:00

| (1 BP) Taunton Titans | 29 – 12 | Redruth |
| | Report |

Towergate Stadium
Attendance: 480
Referee: Neil Sweeney

=== Round 3 ===
21 September 2019
14:30

| Clifton | 18 – 14 | Bury St Edmunds (1 BP) |
| | Report |

Station Road
Attendance: 107
Referee: James Milliner-Woodcock

21 September 2019
15:00

| (1 BP) Esher | 54 – 26 | Dings Crusaders (1 BP) |
| | Report |

Molesey Road
Attendance: 475
Referee: Andrew MacNeaney

21 September 2019
15:00

| (1 BP) Henley Hawks | 66 – 24 | Bournemouth (1 BP) |
| | Report |

Dry Leas
Attendance: 441
Referee: Benjamin Wilde

21 September 2019
15:00

| (1 BP) Old Albanian | 43 – 18 | Sutton & Epsom |
| | Report |

Woollam's Playing Fields
Attendance: 327
Referee: Dan Parrott

21 September 2019
15:00

| (1 BP) Redruth | 10 – 12 | Barnes |
| | Report |

Recreation Ground
Attendance: 485
Referee: Iain Kiy

21 September 2019
15:00

| (1 BP) Tonbridge Juddians | 46 – 17 | Old Redcliffians |
| | Report |

The Slade
Attendance: 157
Referee: Ieuan Davies

21 September 2019
15:00

| (1 BP) Westcliff | 12 – 19 | Leicester Lions |
| | Report |

The Gables
Attendance: 204
Referee: Sam Phillips

21 September 2019
15:00

| (2 BP) Worthing Raiders | 42 – 46 | Taunton Titans (1 BP) |
| | Report |

Roundstone Lane
Attendance: 609
Referee: Hamish Grant

=== Round 4 ===
28 September 2019
14:00

| (1 BP) Leicester Lions | 39 – 20 | Clifton |
| | Report |

Westleigh Park
Attendance: 139
Referee: Carl Adams

28 September 2019
14:00

| Worthing Raiders | 19 – 30 | Redruth (1 BP) |
| | Report |

Roundstone Lane
Attendance: 425
Referee: Andrew MacNeaney

28 September 2019
15:00

| Bournemouth | 10 – 49 | Tonbridge Juddians (1 BP) |

Chapel Gate
Attendance: 150
Referee: Benjamin Russell

28 September 2019
15:00

| (1 BP) Bury St Edmunds | 24 – 14 | Esher |

The Haberden
Attendance: 412
Referee: Luke Davies

28 September 2019
15:00

| (1 BP) Dings Crusaders | 34 – 15 | Barnes |
| | Report |

Shaftesbury Park
Attendance: 438 (Note: Rugby Statbunker gives an attendance of 320 for Dings Crusaders v Barnes on 28 September 2019, while The Rugby Paper give a figure of 438. As Rugby Statbunker has tended to underestimate the Dings attendances, The Rugby Paper figure is used instead.)
Referee: Daniel Rowlands

28 September 2019
15:00

| Old Redcliffians | 21 – 8 | Old Albanian |

Scotland Lane
Attendance: 120
Referee: Iain Kiy

28 September 2019
15:00

| Sutton & Epsom | 21 – 17 | Westcliff (1 BP) |
| | Report |

Rugby Lane
Attendance: 157
Referee: James Clarke

28 September 2019
15:00

| Taunton Titans | 25 – 17 | Henley Hawks |
| | Report |

Towergate Stadium
Attendance: 410
Referee: James Milliner-Woodcock

=== Round 5 ===
5 October 2019
14:30

| (1 BP) Clifton | 38 – 31 | Sutton & Epsom (2 BP) |

Station Road
Attendance: 101
Referee: Neil Sweeney

5 October 2019
15:00

| (1 BP) Barnes | 10 – 12 | Bury St Edmunds |

Barn Elms
Attendance: 169
Referee: Daniel Collins

5 October 2019
15:00

| Esher | 16 – 12 | Leicester Lions (1 BP) |

Molesey Road
Attendance: 235
Referee: Jack Sutton

5 October 2019
15:00

| (1 BP) Henley Hawks | 63 – 7 | Worthing Raiders |

Dry Leas
Attendance: 335
Referee: Nick Wood

5 October 2019
15:00

| (1 BP) Old Albanian | 39 – 14 | Bournemouth |

Woollam's Playing Fields
Attendance: 314
Referee: James Clarke

5 October 2019
15:00

| Redruth | 26 – 23 | Dings Crusaders (1 BP) |

Recreation Ground
Attendance: 548
Referee: James Milliner-Woodcock

5 October 2019
15:00

| (1 BP) Tonbridge Juddians | 68 – 31 | Taunton Titans (1 BP) |

The Slade
Attendance: 256
Referee: Sam Phillips

5 October 2019
15:00

| (1 BP) Westcliff | 18 – 23 | Old Redcliffians |

The Gables
Attendance: 262
Referee: Hamish Grant

=== Round 6 ===
12 October 2019
14:00

| Leicester Lions | 21 – 9 | Barnes |

Westleigh Park
Attendance: 154
Referee: Benjamin Davis

12 October 2019
15:00

| (1 BP) Bournemouth | 39 – 12 | Westcliff |

Chapel Lane
Attendance: 276
Referee: Samuel Phillips

12 October 2019
15:00

| Bury St Edmunds | 17 – 10 | Dings Crusaders (1 BP) |

The Haberden
Attendance: 345
Referee: Jack Sutton

12 October 2019
15:00

| Henley Hawks | 20 – 20 | Redruth |

Dry Leas
Attendance: 295
Referee: Neil Sweeney

12 October 2019
15:00

| Old Redcliffians | 15 – 31 | Clifton (1 BP) |

Scotland Lane
Attendance: 222
Referee: Iain Kiy

12 October 2019
15:00

| Sutton & Epsom | 6 – 38 | Esher (1 BP) |

Rugby Lane
Attendance: 327
Referee: Hamish Grant

12 October 2019
15:00

| (1 BP) Taunton Titans | 38 – 36 | Old Albanian (2 BP) |

Towergate Stadium
Attendance: 320
Referee: Andrew Wigley

12 October 2019
15:00

| Worthing Raiders | 10 – 45 | Tonbridge Juddians (1 BP) |

Roundstone Lane
Attendance: 373
Referee: Daniel Collins

=== Round 7 ===
19 October 2019
14:00

| (1 BP) Redruth | 35 – 28 | Bury St Edmunds (1 BP) |

Recreation Ground
Attendance: 515
Referee: Benjamin Russell

19 October 2019
14:30

| (1 BP) Clifton | 28 – 15 | Bournemouth |

Station Road
Attendance: 106
Referee: Alan Chandrachud

19 October 2019
15:00

| Barnes | 25 – 41 | Sutton & Epsom (1 BP) |

Barn Elms
Attendance: 229
Referee: Benjamin Wilde

19 October 2019
15:00

| (2 BP) Dings Crusaders | 27 – 29 | Leicester Lions (1 BP) |

Shaftesbury Park
Attendance: 384
Referee: Andrew Wigley

19 October 2019
15:00

| (1 BP) Esher | 30 – 26 | Old Redcliffians (2 BP) |

Molesey Road
Attendance: 427
Referee: Luke Davies

19 October 2019
15:00

| (1 BP) Old Albanian | 54 – 17 | Worthing Raiders |

Woollam's Playing Fields
Attendance: 327
Referee: Jack Sutton

19 October 2019
15:00

| Tonbridge Juddians | 15 – 27 | Henley Hawks (1 BP) |

The Slade
Attendance: 221
Referee: Daniel Collins

19 October 2019
15:00

| Westcliff | 27 – 54 | Taunton Titans (1 BP) |

The Gables
Attendance: 204
Referee: Calum Howard

=== Round 8 ===
25 October 2019
19:45

| (1 BP) Taunton Titans | 35 – 27 | Clifton (1 BP) |

Towergate Stadium
Attendance: 485
Referee: Hamish Grant

26 October 2019
14:00

| Leicester Lions | 17 – 0 | Bury St Edmunds |

Westleigh Park
Attendance: 131
Referee: Carl Adams

26 October 2019
14:00

| Tonbridge Juddians | 13 – 7 | Redruth (1 BP) |

The Slade
Attendance: 165
Referee: Luke Davies

26 October 2019
15:00

| Bournemouth | 7 – 24 | Esher |

Chapel Lane
Attendance: 240
Referee: James Clarke

26 October 2019
15:00

| Henley Hawks | 25 – 18 | Old Albanian (1 BP) |

Dry Leas
Attendance: 246
Referee: Iain Kiy

26 October 2019
15:00

| Old Redcliffians | 21 – 17 | Barnes (1 BP) |

Scotland Lane
Attendance: 130
Referee: James Milliner-Woodcock

26 October 2019
15:00

| Sutton & Epsom | 7 – 15 | Dings Crusaders |

Rugby Lane
Attendance: 161
Referee: Jack Sutton

26 October 2019
15:00

| (1 BP) Worthing Raiders | 15 – 19 | Westcliff |

Roundstone Lane
Attendance: 308
Referee: Alan Chandrachud

=== Round 9 ===
2 November 2019
14:30

| (1 BP) Barnes | 41 – 17 | Bournemouth |

Barn Elms
Attendance: 250
Referee: Alan Chandrachud

2 November 2019
14:30

| Clifton | 10 – 24 | Worthing Raiders (1 BP) |

Station Road
Attendance: 102
Referee: Adam Wookey

2 November 2019
14:30

| Redruth | 20 – 7 | Leicester Lions |

Recreation Ground
Attendance: 656
Referee: Iain Kiy

2 November 2019
14:30

| Westcliff | 15 – 26 | Henley Hawks (1 BP) |

The Gables
Attendance: 248
Referee: Hamish Grant

2 November 2019
15:00

| (1 BP) Bury St Edmunds | 33 – 0 | Sutton & Epsom |

The Haberden
Attendance: 305
Referee: Ieuan Davies

2 November 2019
15:00

| Dings Crusaders | 17 – 5 | Old Redcliffians |

Shaftesbury Park
Attendance: 849
Referee: Charles Gayther

2 November 2019
15:00

| Esher | 10 – 8 | Taunton Titans (1 BP) |

Molesey Road
Attendance: 512
Referee: Benjamin Wilde

2 November 2019
15:00

| (1 BP) Old Albanian | 9 – 12 | Tonbridge Juddians |

Woollam's Playing Fields
Attendance: 317
Referee: Veryan Boscawen

=== Round 10 ===
9 November 2019
14:00

| (1 BP) Bournemouth | 26 – 33 | Dings Crusaders (1 BP) |

Chapel Gate
Attendance: 144
Referee: Samuel Phillips

9 November 2019
14:00

| Worthing Raiders | 20 – 15 | Esher (1 BP) |

Roundstone Lane
Attendance: 301
Referee: Andrew MacNeaney

9 November 2019
14:30

| Old Redcliffians | P – P | Bury St Edmunds |

Scotland Lane

- Postponed due to unplayable pitch caused by bad weather (rain). Game to be rescheduled for 22 February 2020.

9 November 2019
14:30

| (1 BP) Tonbridge Juddians | 42 – 5 | Westcliff |

The Slade
Attendance: 178
Referee: Calum Howard

9 November 2019
15:00

| (1 BP) Henley Hawks | 17 – 20 | Clifton |

Dry Leas
Attendance: 250
Referee: Jack Sutton

9 November 2019
15:00

| Old Albanian | 5 – 30 | Redruth (1 BP) |

Woollam's Playing Fields
Attendance: 188
Referee: Ieaun Davies

9 November 2019
15:00

| Sutton & Epsom | 7 – 23 | Leicester Lions |

Rugby Lane
Attendance: 147
Referee: Veryan Boscawen

9 November 2019
15:00

| (1 BP) Taunton Titans | 48 – 19 | Barnes |

Towergate Stadium
Attendance: 405
Referee: Matthew Sharp

=== Round 11 ===
16 November 2019
14:00

| (1 BP) Leicester Lions | 27 – 7 | Old Redcliffians |

Westleigh Park
Attendance: 118
Referee: Ieuan Davies

16 November 2019
14:30

| (2 BP) Barnes | 31 – 32 | Worthing Raiders (1 BP) |

Barn Elms
Attendance: 179
Referee: Sam Phillips

16 November 2019
14:30

| Clifton | 23 – 22 | Tonbridge Juddians (1 BP) |

Station Road
Attendance: 112
Referee: Benjamin Davis

16 November 2019
14:30

| (1 BP) Redruth | 49 – 12 | Sutton & Epsom |

Recreation Ground
Attendance: 560
Referee: Alan Chandrachud

16 November 2019
14:30

| (1 BP) Westcliff | 17 – 19 | Old Albanian |

The Gables
Attendance: 238
Referee: Andrew MacNeaney

16 November 2019
15:00

| (1 BP) Bury St Edmunds | 47 – 12 | Bournemouth |

The Haberden
Attendance: 417
Referee: Luke Davies

16 November 2019
15:00

| Dings Crusaders | 27 – 45 | Taunton Titans (1 BP) |

Shaftesbury Park
Attendance: 349
Referee: James Milliner-Woodcock

16 November 2019
15:00

| Esher | 13 – 34 | Henley Hawks (1 BP) |

Molesey Road
Attendance: 524
Referee: Veryan Boscawen

=== Round 12 ===
23 November 2019
14:00

| (1 BP) Bournemouth | 16 – 17 | Leicester Lions |

Chapel Gate
Attendance: 217
Referee: Adam Wookey

23 November 2019
14:00

| (1 BP) Westcliff | 24 – 19 | Redruth (1 BP) |

The Gables
Attendance: 317
Referee: Daniel Collins

23 November 2019
14:00

| (1 BP) Worthing Raiders | 32 – 10 | Dings Crusaders |

Roundstone Lane
Attendance: 345
Referee: Jonathan Cook

23 November 2019
14:30

| Old Redcliffians | 10 – 10 | Sutton & Epsom |

Scotland Lane
Attendance: 150
Referee: Jack Sutton

23 November 2019
14:30

| Tonbridge Juddians | 17 – 11 | Esher (1 BP) |

The Slade
Attendance: 227
Referee: Alan Chandrachud

23 November 2019
15:00

| (1 BP) Henley Hawks | 34 – 22 | Barnes |

Dry Leas
Attendance: 295
Referee: Andrew MacNeaney

23 November 2019
15:00

| Old Albanian | 7 – 43 | Clifton (1 BP) |

Woollam's Playing Fields
Attendance: 268
Referee: Andrew Wigley

23 November 2019
15:00

| Taunton Titans | 22 – 15 | Bury St Edmunds |

Towergate Stadium
Attendance: 352
Referee: Charles Gayther

=== Round 13 ===
30 November 2019
14:00

| Leicester Lions | 12 – 6 | Taunton Titans (1 BP) |

Westleigh Park
Attendance: 127
Referee: James Clarke

30 November 2019
14:30

| Barnes | 12 – 32 | Tonbridge Juddians (1 BP) |

Barn Elms
Attendance: 209
Referee: Jack Sutton

30 November 2019
14:30

| (1 BP) Clifton | 59 – 14 | Westcliff |

Station Road
Attendance: 121
Referee: Lloyd Davies

30 November 2019
14:30

| Redruth | 13 – 0 | Old Redcliffians |

Recreation Ground
Attendance: 505
Referee: Neil Sweeney

30 November 2019
15:00

| (1 BP) Bury St Edmunds | 36 – 31 | Worthing Raiders (2 BP) |

The Haberden
Attendance: 417
Referee: Daniel Rowlands

30 November 2019
15:00

| (1 BP) Dings Crusaders | 27 – 36 | Henley Hawks (1 BP) |

Shaftesbury Park
Attendance: 316
Referee: Matthew Astle

30 November 2019
15:00

| (1 BP) Esher | 31 – 20 | Old Albanian |

Molesey Road
Attendance: 646
Referee: Daniel Collins

30 November 2019
15:00

| Sutton & Epsom | A – A (Note: The Sutton & Epsom v Bournemouth game was abandoned after 60 minutes with the score at 20 - 15 to Sutton & Epsom due to local power cut causing failure to floodlights. Game to be replayed.) | Bournemouth |

Rugby Lane
Attendance: 210 (Note: Sutton & Epsom's attendance of 210 against Bournemouth on 30 November 2019 will not be counted towards their final attendance due to the game being abandoned and later rescheduled. The rescheduled game's figure on 22 February 2020 will be used instead.)
Referee: Calum Howard

- Abandoned after 60 minutes due to power cut. Game eventually rescheduled for 22 February 2020.

=== Round 14 ===
7 December 2019
14:00

| Bournemouth | 24 – 23 | Old Redcliffians (1 BP) |

Chapel Gate
Attendance: 253
Referee: Adam Wookey

7 December 2019
14:00

| Westcliff | 22 – 17 | Esher (1 BP) |

The Gables
Attendance: 438
Referee: Ben Wilde

7 December 2019
14:00

| Worthing Raiders | 27 – 23 | Leicester Lions (1 BP) |

Roundstone Lane
Attendance: 442
Referee: Neil Sweeney

7 December 2019
14:30

| (2 BP) Clifton | 30 – 35 | Redruth (1 BP) |

Station Road
Attendance: 134
Referee: Brian Ravenhill

7 December 2019
14:30

| (1 BP) Tonbridge Juddians | 38 – 5 | Dings Crusaders |

The Slade
Attendance: 157
Referee: Joe James

7 December 2019
15:00

| Henley Hawks | 21 – 18 | Bury St Edmunds (1 BP) |

Dry Leas
Attendance: 278
Referee: George Richardson

7 December 2019
15:00

| (2 BP) Old Albanian | 24 – 26 | Barnes (1 BP) |

Woollam's Playing Fields
Attendance: 152
Referee: Dan Parrott

7 December 2019
15:00

| (1 BP) Sutton & Epsom | 12 – 15 | Taunton Titans |

Rugby Lane
Attendance: 157
Referee: Jack LeFeuvre

=== Round 15 ===
14 December 2019
14:00

| (1 BP) Barnes | 34 – 27 | Westcliff (1 BP) |

Barn Elms
Attendance: 189
Referee: Andrew MacNeaney

14 December 2019
14:00

| (1 BP) Leicester Lions | 10 – 14 | Henley Hawks |

Westleigh Park
Attendance: 149
Referee: Owen Taylor

14 December 2019
14:00

| Old Redcliffians | 5 – 33 | Taunton Titans (1 BP) |

Scotland Lane
Attendance: 119
Referee: James Milliner

14 December 2019
14:00

| Redruth | 17 – 10 | Bournemouth (1 BP) |

Recreation Ground
Attendance: 504
Referee: Lloyd Davies

14 December 2019
15:00

| (1 BP) Bury St Edmunds | 13 – 17 | Tonbridge Juddians |

The Haberden
Attendance: 353
Referee: Andrew Smith

14 December 2019
15:00

| (1 BP) Dings Crusaders | 22 – 20 | Old Albanian (2 BP) |

Shaftesbury Park
Attendance: 379
Referee: Matthew Sharpe

14 December 2019
15:00

| (1 BP) Esher | 32 – 26 | Clifton (2 BP) |

Molesey Road
Attendance: 358
Referee: Ben Rayner

14 December 2019
15:00

| (2 BP) Sutton & Epsom | 24 – 30 | Worthing Raiders (1 BP) |

Rugby Lane
Attendance: 263
Referee: Tom Bird

=== Round 16 ===
21 December 2019
14:00

| Redruth | 26 – 20 | Taunton Titans (1 BP) |

Recreation Ground
Attendance: 920
Referee: Adam Wookey

21 December 2019
14:00

| Westcliff | 15 – 36 | Bury St Edmunds (1 BP) |

The Gables
Attendance: 311
Referee: Neil Sweeney

21 December 2019
14:00

| (1 BP) Worthing Raiders | 43 – 24 | Bournemouth (1 BP) |

Roundstone Lane
Attendance: 562
Referee: Samuel Phillips

21 December 2019
14:30

| (1 BP) Clifton | 31 – 21 | Dings Crusaders |

Station Road
Attendance: 441
Referee: James Clarke

21 December 2019
14:30

| (1 BP) Tonbridge Juddians | 83 – 10 | Sutton & Epsom |

The Judd School (Note: Due to flooding Tonbridge Juddians home game against Sutton & Espom on 21 September 2019 was held at Juddians 3G training ground at The Judd School.)
Attendance: 0
Referee: Daniel Collins

21 December 2019
15:00

| Esher | P – P | Barnes |

Molesey Road

- Postponed due to unplayable pitch caused by heavy rain. Game to be rescheduled for 21 February 2020.

21 December 2019
15:00

| (1 BP) Henley Hawks | 31 – 19 | Old Redcliffians |

Dry Leas
Attendance: 427
Referee: Luke Davies

21 December 2019
15:00

| Old Albanian | P – P | Leicester Lions |

Woollam's Playing Fields

- Postponed due to unplayable pitch caused by heavy rain. Game to be rescheduled for 22 February 2020.

=== Round 17 ===
4 January 2020
14:00

| Barnes | 17 – 26 | Redruth |

Barn Elms
Attendance: 129
Referee: Neil Sweeney

4 January 2020
14:00

| (1 BP) Bournemouth | 20 – 26 | Henley Hawks |

Chapel Gate
Attendance: 189
Referee: Benjamin Russell

4 January 2020
14:00

| (1 BP) Leicester Lions | 45 – 10 | Westcliff |

Westleigh Park
Attendance: 123
Referee: Daniel Woods

4 January 2020
14:00

| Old Redcliffians | 10 – 21 | Tonbridge Juddians |

Scotland Lane
Attendance: 227
Referee: James Milliner

4 January 2020
15:00

| Bury St Edmunds | 24 – 22 | Clifton (1 BP) |

The Harberden
Attendance: 371
Referee: Matthew Sharpe

4 January 2020
15:00

| (1 BP) Dings Crusaders | 45 – 33 | Esher (1 BP) |

Shaftesbury Park
Attendance: 347
Referee: Iain Kiy

4 January 2020
15:00

| Sutton & Epsom | 22 – 55 | Old Albanian (1 BP) |

Rugby Lane
Attendance: 187
Referee: Andrew MacNeaney

4 January 2020
15:00

| (1 BP) Taunton Titans | 40 – 32 | Worthing Raiders (1 BP) |

Towergate Stadium
Attendance: 446
Referee: Adam Wookey

=== Round 18 ===
11 January 2020
14:00

| Barnes | 22 – 12 | Dings Crusaders |

Barn Elms
Attendance: 69
Referee: Luke Davies

11 January 2020
14:00

| (1 BP) Redruth | 25 – 0 | Worthing Raiders |

Recreation Ground
Attendance: 865
Referee: Iain Kiy

11 January 2020
14:00

| Westcliff | 21 – 8 | Sutton & Epsom |

The Gables
Attendance: 247
Referee: Matthew Sharpe

11 January 2020
14:30

| Clifton | 13 – 39 | Leicester Lions (1 BP) |

Station Road
Attendance: 112
Referee: Alan Chandrachud

11 January 2020
14:30

| (1 BP) Tonbridge Juddians | 27 – 7 | Bournemouth |

The Slade
Attendance: 201
Referee: Andrew MacNeaney

11 January 2020
15:00

| (1 BP) Esher | 14 – 21 | Bury St Edmunds |

Molesey Road
Attendance: 673
Referee: Hamish Grant

11 January 2020
15:00

| (1 BP) Henley Hawks | 33 – 27 | Taunton Titans (2 BP) |

Dry Leas
Attendance: 410
Referee: Daniel Collins

11 January 2020
15:00

| (1 BP) Old Albanian | 33 – 3 | Old Redcliffians |

Woollam's Playing Fields
Attendance: 264
Referee: Tom Bird

=== Round 19 ===
18 January 2020
14:00

| (1 BP) Bournemouth | 26 – 28 | Old Albanian |

Chapel Gate
Attendance: 244
Referee: Alan Chandrachud

18 January 2020
14:00

| (1 BP) Leicester Lions | 17 – 20 | Esher |

Westleigh Park
Attendance: 124
Referee: Elliot Lewis

18 January 2020
14:00

| (1 BP) Old Redcliffians | 26 – 38 | Westcliff (1 BP) |

Scotland Lane
Attendance: 138
Referee: James Milliner-Woodcock

18 January 2020
14:00

| Worthing Raiders | 7 – 33 | Henley Hawks (1 BP) |

Roundstone Lane
Attendance: 342
Referee: Veryan Boscawen

18 January 2020
15:00

| (2 BP) Bury St Edmunds | 34 – 36 | Barnes (1 BP) |

The Haberden
Attendance: 447
Referee: Matthew Sharpe

18 January 2020
15:00

| Dings Crusaders | 8 – 37 | Redruth (1 BP) |

Shaftesbury Park
Attendance: 416
Referee: Max Weston

18 January 2020
15:00

| Sutton & Epsom | 7 – 27 | Clifton (1 BP) |

Rugby Lane
Attendance: 163
Referee: Lloyd Davies

18 January 2020
15:00

| Taunton Titans | 20 – 5 | Tonbridge Juddians |

Towergate Stadium
Attendance: 582
Referee: Benjamin Russell

=== Round 20 ===
25 January 2020
14:00

| Barnes | 9 – 30 | Leicester Lions |

Barn Elms
Attendance: 209
Referee: Neil Sweeney

25 January 2020
14:00

| (1 BP) Redruth | 33 – 20 | Henley Hawks |

Recreation Ground
Attendance: 890
Referee: Andrew Wigley

25 January 2020
14:00

| (1 BP) Westcliff | 20 – 20 | Bournemouth (1 BP) |

The Gables
Attendance: 359
Referee: Samuel Phillips

25 January 2020
14:30

| (1 BP) Clifton | 41 – 11 | Old Redcliffians |

Station Lane
Attendance: 112
Referee: Adam Wookey

25 January 2020
14:30

| (1 BP) Tonbridge Juddians | 41 – 14 | Worthing Raiders |

The Slade
Attendance: 163
Referee: Callum Howard

25 January 2020
15:00

| (1 BP) Dings Crusaders | 24 – 36 | Bury St Edmunds (1 BP) |

Shaftesbury Park
Attendance: 247
Referee: Ben Rayner

25 January 2020
15:00

| (1 BP) Esher | 39 – 19 | Sutton & Epsom |

Molesey Road
Attendance: 697
Referee: Hamish Grant

25 January 2020
15:00

| (1 BP) Old Albanian | 22 – 23 | Taunton Titans |

Woollam's Playing Fields
Attendance: 212
Referee: Andrew MacNeaney

=== Round 21 ===
1 February 2020
14:00

| Bournemouth | 17 – 43 | Clifton (1 BP) |

Chapel Gate
Attendance: 264
Referee: Samuel Phillips

1 February 2020
14:00

| Bury St Edmunds | 17 – 33 | Redruth (1 BP) |

The Haberden
Attendance: 373
Referee: Daniel Collins

1 February 2020
14:00

| Leicester Lions | 17 – 15 | Dings Crusaders (1 BP) |

Westleigh Park
Attendance: 141
Referee: Peter Caunt

1 February 2020
14:00

| (2 BP) Worthing Raiders | 29 – 30 | Old Albanian (1 BP) |

Roundstone Lane
Attendance: 389
Referee: Alan Chandrachud

1 February 2020
14:30

| (1 BP) Henley Hawks | 17 – 18 | Tonbridge Juddians |

Dry Leas
Attendance: 733
Referee: Veryan Boscawen

1 February 2020
14:30

| Old Redcliffians | 25 – 25 | Esher (1 BP) |

Scotland Lane
Attendance: 98
Referee: Lloyd Davies

1 February 2020
15:00

| Sutton & Epsom | 23 – 17 | Barnes (1 BP) |

Rugby Lane
Attendance: 204
Referee: Benjamin Wilde

1 February 2020
15:00

| (1 BP) Taunton Titans | 43 – 10 | Westcliff |

Towergate Stadium
Attendance: 422
Referee: James Milliner-Woodcock

=== Round 22 ===
7 February 2020
19:45

| Clifton | 10 – 36 | Taunton Titans (1 BP) |

Station Road
Attendance: 223
Referee: Andrew Wigley

8 February 2020
14:00

| Redruth | 14 – 3 | Tonbridge Juddians |

Recreation Ground
Attendance: 845
Referee: Alan Chandrachud

8 February 2020
14:30

| (1 BP) Barnes | 29 – 10 | Old Redcliffians |

Barn Elms
Attendance: 193
Referee: Daniel Rowlands

8 February 2020
14:30

| (2 BP) Westcliff | 29 – 34 | Worthing Raiders (1 BP) |

The Gables
Attendance: 173
Referee: Ben Wilde

8 February 2020
15:00

| (1 BP) Bury St Edmunds | 29 – 28 | Leicester Lions (2 BP) |

The Haberden
Attendance: 311
Referee: Matthew Sharpe

8 February 2020
15:00

| (1 BP) Dings Crusaders | 39 – 21 | Sutton & Epsom |

Shaftesbury Park
Attendance: 276
Referee: Benjamin Russell

8 February 2020
15:00

| (1 BP) Esher | 40 – 7 | Bournemouth |

Molesey Road
Attendance: 284
Referee: Calum Howard

8 February 2020
15:00

| (1 BP) Old Albanian | 16 – 20 | Henley Hawks |

Woollam's Playing Fields
Attendance: 327
Referee: Jonathan Cook

=== Round 23 ===
15 February 2020
14:00

| Bournemouth | P – P | Barnes |

Chapel Gate

- Postponed. Game to be rescheduled for 14 March 2020.

15 February 2020
14:00

| Leicester Lions | P – P | Redruth |

Westleigh Park

- Postponed. Game to be rescheduled for 14 March 2020.

15 February 2020
14:00

| Worthing Raiders | 10 – 24 | Clifton (1 BP) |

Roundstone Lane
Attendance: 245
Referee: Neil Sweeney

15 February 2020
14:30

| Old Redcliffians | P – P | Dings Crusaders |

Scotland Lane

- Postponed. Game to be rescheduled for 14 March 2020.

15 February 2020
14:30

| Tonbridge Juddians | 26 – 24 | Old Albanian (1 BP) |

The Slade
Attendance: 109
Referee: Ben Wilde

15 February 2020
15:00

| (1 BP) Henley Hawks | 29 – 5 | Westcliff |

Dry Leas
Attendance: 210
Referee: Andrew MacNeaney

15 February 2020
15:00

| Sutton & Epsom | 12 – 34 | Bury St Edmunds (1 BP) |

Rugby Lane
Attendance: 258
Referee: Calum Howard

15 February 2020
15:00

| Taunton Titans | P – P | Esher |

Towergate Stadium

- Postponed. Game to be rescheduled for 14 March 2020.

=== Rounds 10, 13 & 16 (rescheduled games) ===
21 February 2020
19:30

| (1 BP) Esher | 34 – 10 | Barnes |

Molesey Road
Attendance: 478
Referee: Sam Phillips

- Game rescheduled from 21 December 2019.

22 February 2020
14:30

| Old Redcliffians | P – P | Bury St Edmunds |

Scotland Lane

- Game originally rescheduled from 9 November 2019 but postponed again due to poor weather. Game to be rescheduled for 11 April 2020.

22 February 2020
15:00

| (1 BP) Old Albanian | 8 – 10 | Leicester Lions |

Woollam's Playing Fields
Attendance: 316
Referee: Jonathan Cook

- Game rescheduled from 21 December 2019.

22 February 2020
15:00

| (1 BP) Sutton & Epsom | 43 – 19 | Bournemouth |

Rugby Park
Attendance: 176
Referee: Iain Kiy

- Game rescheduled from 30 November 2019.

=== Round 24 ===
29 February 2020
14:00

| Leicester Lions | P – P | Sutton & Epsom |

Westleigh Park

- Postponed due to unplayable pitch caused by heavy rain. Game to be rescheduled for 11 April 2020.

29 February 2020
14:30

| Clifton | 20 – 10 | Henley Hawks |

Station Road
Attendance: 220
Referee: Daniel Rowlands

29 February 2020
14:30

| Redruth | 21 – 12 | Old Albanian |

Recreation Ground
Attendance: 870
Referee: Charlie Gayther

29 February 2020
14:30

| (1 BP) Westcliff | 12 – 19 | Tonbridge Juddians |

The Gables
Attendance: 246
Referee: Matt Sharpe

29 February 2020
15:00

| (1 BP) Bury St Edmunds | 66 – 22 | Old Redcliffians (1 BP) |

The Haberden
Attendance: 373
Referee: Andrew MacNeaney

29 February 2020
15:00

| (1 BP) Dings Crusaders | 51 – 14 | Bournemouth |

Shaftesbury Park
Attendance: 547
Referee: Neil Sweeney

29 February 2020
15:00

| Esher | P – P | Worthing Raiders |

Molesey Road

- Postponed due to unplayable pitch caused by heavy rain. Game to be rescheduled for 11 April 2020.

29 February 2020
15:30

| Barnes | 10 – 45 | Taunton Titans (1 BP) |

The Rock (Note: Due to flooding of Barn Elms, Barnes game against Taunton Titans on 29 February 2020 was instead held at The Rock, the home ground of Rosslyn Park, with kickoff moved from 14:30 to 15:30.)
Attendance: 100
Referee: Samuel Phillips

=== Round 25 ===
7 March 2020
14:30

| (1 BP) Henley Hawks | 46 – 20 | Esher |

Dry Leas
Attendance: 366
Referee: Alan Chandrachud

7 March 2020
14:30

| (1 BP) Old Redcliffians | 10 – 13 | Leicester Lions |

Scotland Lane
Attendance: 50
Referee: Carl Adams

7 March 2020
14:30

| (1 BP) Taunton Titans | 29 – 22 | Dings Crusaders (2 BP) |

Towergate Stadium
Attendance: 462
Referee: Iain Kiy

7 March 2020
15:00

| Bournemouth | 21 – 34 | Bury St Edmunds (1 BP) |

Chapel Gate
Attendance: 220
Referee: Adam Wookey

7 March 2020
15:00

| (1 BP) Old Albanian | 10 – 16 | Westcliff |

Woollam's Playing Fields
Attendance: 274
Referee: Neil Sweeney

7 March 2020
15:00

| Sutton & Epsom | 22 – 41 | Redruth (1 BP) |

Rugby Lane
Attendance: 157
Referee: Matthew Sharpe

7 March 2020
15:00

| (1 BP) Tonbridge Juddians | 36 – 32 | Clifton (2 BP) |

The Judd School (Note: Due to unplayable pitch at The Slade, Tonbridge Juddians home game against Clifton on 7 March 2020 was held at Juddians 3G training ground at The Judd School.)
Attendance: 120
Referee: Benjamin Wilde

7 March 2020
15:00

| (1 BP) Worthing Raiders | 43 – 30 | Barnes (1 BP) |

Roundstone Lane
Attendance: 435
Referee: Hamish Grant

=== Round 23 (rescheduled games) ===
14 March 2020
14:00

| Leicester Lions | 15 – 31 | Redruth (1 BP) |

Westleigh Park
Attendance: 127
Referee: Iain Kiy

- Game rescheduled from 15 February 2020.

14 March 2020
14:30

| Old Redcliffians | P – P | Dings Crusaders |

Scotland Lane

- Game originally rescheduled from 15 February 2020 but postponed again due a Dings player being potentially exposed to COVID-19. Game to be rescheduled.

14 March 2020
14:30

| (1 BP) Taunton Titans | 48 – 10 | Esher |

Towergate Stadium
Attendance: 412
Referee: James Milliner-Woodcock

- Game rescheduled from 15 February 2020.

14 March 2020
15:00

| (1 BP) Bournemouth | 14 – 15 | Barnes |

Chapel Gate
Attendance: 150
Referee: Alan Chandrachud

- Game rescheduled from 15 February 2020.

=== Round 26 ===
21 March 2020
14:00

| Leicester Lions | C – C | Bournemouth |

Westleigh Park

21 March 2020
14:00

| Redruth | C – C | Westcliff |

Recreation Ground

21 March 2020
14:30

| Clifton | C – C | Old Albanian |

Station Road

21 March 2020
15:00

| Barnes | C – C | Henley Hawks |

Barn Elms

21 March 2020
15:00

| Bury St Edmunds | C – C | Taunton Titans |

The Haberden

21 March 2020
15:00

| Dings Crusaders | C – C | Worthing Raiders |

Shaftesbury Park

21 March 2020
15:00

| Esher | C – C | Tonbridge Juddians |

Molesey Road

21 March 2020
15:00

| Sutton & Epsom | C – C | Old Redcliffians |

Rugby Lane

=== Round 27 ===
28 March 2020
15:00

| Bournemouth | C – C | v Sutton & Epsom |

Chapel Gate

28 March 2020
15:00

| Henley Hawks | C – C | Dings Crusaders |

Dry Leas

28 March 2020
15:00

| Old Albanian | C – C | Esher |

Woollam's Playing Fields

28 March 2020
15:00

| Old Redcliffians | C – C | Redruth |

Scotland Lane

28 March 2020
15:00

| Taunton Titans | C – C | Leicester Lions |

Towergate Stadium

28 March 2020
15:00

| Tonbridge Juddians | C – C | Barnes |

The Slade

28 March 2020
15:00

| Westcliff | C – C | Clifton |

The Gables

28 March 2020
15:00

| Worthing Raiders | C – C | Bury St Edmunds |

Roundstone Lane

=== Round 28 ===
4 April 2020
14:00

| Leicester Lions | C – C | Worthing Raiders |

Westleigh Park

4 April 2020
15:00

| Barnes | C – C | Old Albanian |

Barn Elms

4 April 2020
15:00

| Bury St Edmunds | C – C | Henley Hawks |

The Haberden

4 April 2020
15:00

| Dings Crusaders | C – C | Tonbridge Juddians |

Shaftesbury Park

4 April 2020
15:00

| Esher | C – C | Westcliff |

Molesey Road

4 April 2020
15:00

| Old Redcliffians | C – C | Bournemouth |

Scotland Lane

4 April 2020
15:00

| Redruth | C – C | Clifton |

Recreation Ground

4 April 2020
15:00

| Taunton Titans | C – C | Sutton & Epsom |

Towergate Stadium

=== Rounds 10 & 24 (rescheduled games) ===
10 April 2020
15:00

| Esher | C – C | Worthing Raiders |

Molesey Road

- Game rescheduled from 29 February 2020.

11 April 2020
14:00

| Leicester Lions | C – C | Sutton & Epsom |

Westleigh Park

- Game rescheduled from 29 February 2020.

11 April 2020
14:30

| Old Redcliffians | P – P | Bury St Edmunds |

Scotland Lane

- Game rescheduled from 9 November 2019 and then 22 February 2020.

=== Round 29 ===
18 April 2020
14:30

| Clifton | C – C | Esher |

Station Road

18 April 2020
15:00

| Bournemouth | C – C | Redruth |

Chapel Gate

18 April 2020
15:00

| Henley Hawks | C – C | Leicester Lions |

Dry Leas

18 April 2020
15:00

| Old Albanian | C – C | Dings Crusaders |

Woollam's Playing Fields

18 April 2020
15:00

| Taunton Titans | C – C | Old Redcliffians |

Towergate Stadium

18 April 2020
15:00

| Tonbridge Juddians | C – C | Bury St Edmunds |

The Slade

18 April 2020
15:00

| Westcliff | C – C | Barnes |

The Gables

18 April 2020
15:00

| Worthing Raiders | C – C | Sutton & Epsom |

Roundstone Lane

=== Round 30 ===
25 April 2020
15:00

| Barnes | C – C | Clifton |

Barn Elms

25 April 2020
15:00

| Bournemouth | C – C | Taunton Titans |

Chapel Gate

25 April 2020
15:00

| Bury St Edmunds | C – C | Old Albanian |

The Haberden

25 April 2020
15:00

| Dings Crusaders | C – C | Westcliff |

Shaftesbury Park

25 April 2020
15:00

| Esher | C – C | Redruth |

Molesey Road

25 April 2020
15:00

| Leicester Lions | C – C | Tonbridge Juddians |

Westleigh Park

25 April 2020
15:00

| Old Redcliffians | C – C | Worthing Raiders |

Scotland Lane

25 April 2020
15:00

| Sutton & Epsom | C – C | Henley Hawks |

Rugby Lane

== Attendances ==
- Does not include promotion play-off.

| Club | Home games | Total | Average | Highest | Lowest | % Capacity |
|---|---|---|---|---|---|---|
| Barnes | 12 | 2,106 | 176 | 250 | 69 | 35% |
| Bournemouth | 12 | 2,710 | 226 | 363 | 144 | 15% |
| Bury St Edmunds | 12 | 4,555 | 380 | 447 | 305 | 13% |
| Clifton | 13 | 2,112 | 162 | 441 | 101 | 7% |
| Dings Crusaders | 12 | 5,624 | 469 | 1,076 | 247 | 21% |
| Esher | 11 | 5,309 | 483 | 697 | 235 | 14% |
| Henley Hawks | 13 | 4,611 | 355 | 733 | 210 | 12% |
| Leicester Lions | 11 | 1,491 | 136 | 158 | 118 | 7% |
| Old Albanian | 13 | 3,606 | 277 | 327 | 152 | 28% |
| Old Redcliffians | 10 | 1,380 | 138 | 227 | 50 | 14% |
| Redruth | 13 | 8,789 | 676 | 920 | 485 | 19% |
| Sutton & Epsom | 13 | 2,637 | 203 | 327 | 147 | |
| Taunton Titans | 12 | 5,176 | 431 | 582 | 320 | 22% |
| Tonbridge Juddians | 13 | 2,124 | 163 | 256 | 0 | 12% |
| Westcliff | 13 | 3,447 | 265 | 438 | 173 | 27% |
| Worthing Raiders | 13 | 5,257 | 404 | 609 | 245 | 27% |

== Individual statistics ==
- Note that points scorers includes tries as well as conversions, penalties and drop goals.

=== Top points scorers ===
| Rank | Player | Team | Points |
|---|---|---|---|
| 1 | (England) Gary Kingdom | Taunton Titans | 230 |
| 2 | (Cornwall) Fraser Honey | Redruth | 201 |
| 3 | (England) Will Robinson | Tonbridge Juddians | 200 |
| 4 | (Wales) Matthew McLean | Worthing Raiders | 181 |
| 5 | (England) Bradley Barnes | Clifton | 175 |
| 5 | (England) Grant Hancox | Bournemouth | 175 |
| 6 | (New Zealand) Kodie Drury-Hawkins | Bury St Edmunds | 166 |
| 7 | (England) Josh Hammett | Barnes | 146 |
| 8 | (England) Tristan Roberts | Esher | 142 |

=== Top try scorers ===
| Rank | Player | Team | Tries |
|---|---|---|---|
| 1 | (England) Hugo Watson | Tonbridge Juddians | 22 |
| 2 | (England) Isaac Dalton | Taunton Titans | 16 |
| 3 | (England) Ewan Fenley | Henley Hawks | 14 |
| 3 | (England) Sam Lunnon | Henley Hawks | 14 |
| 4 | (England) Devon Constant | Leicester Lions | 13 |
| 5 | (England) Jack Arnott | Taunton Titans | 12 |
| 5 | (England) Jack Robinson | Henley Hawks | 12 |
| 5 | (England) Ed Sumpter | Leicester Lions | 12 |
| 5 | (Cornwall) Duncan Tout | Tonbridge Juddians | 12 |

== Season records ==
=== Team ===
Largest home win — 73 points

83 – 10 Tonbridge Juddians at home to Sutton & Epsom on 21 December 2019

Largest away win — 60 points

74 – 14 Tonbridge Juddians away to Sutton & Epsom on 14 September 2019

Most points scored — 83 points

83 – 10 Tonbridge Juddians at home to Sutton & Epsom on 21 December 2019

Most tries in a match — 13

Tonbridge Juddians at home to Sutton & Epsom on 21 December 2019

Most conversions in a match — 9 (3)

Henley Hawks at home to Worthing Raiders on 5 October 2019
Tonbridge Juddians at home to Taunton Titans on 5 October 2019
Tonbridge Juddians at home to Sutton & Epsom on 21 December 2019

Most penalties in a match — 5 (2)

Worthing Raiders at home to Old Redcliffians on 7 September 2019
Taunton Titans at home to Bury St Edmunds on 23 November 2019

Most drop goals in a match — 1 (3)

Redruth at home to Old Redcliffians on 30 November 2019
Bury St Edmunds at home to Tonbridge Juddians on 14 December 2019
Leicester Lions away to Old Redcliffians on 7 March 2020

=== Attendances ===
Highest — 1,076

Dings Crusaders at home to Clifton on 14 September 2019

Lowest — 0 (Note: Tonbridge Juddians home game against Sutton & Epsom on 21 December 2019 was a closed game due to flooding making it unsafe for spectators.)

Tonbridge Juddians at home to Sutton & Epsom on 21 December 2019

Highest average attendance — 676

Redruth

Lowest average attendance — 136

Leicester Lions

=== Player ===
Most points in a match — 26

(England) Tristan Roberts for Esher away to Barnes on 14 September 2019

Most tries in a match — 4 (2)

(England) Murray Galbraith-Lowe for Tonbridge Juddians at home to Taunton Titans on 5 October 2019
(England) Ewan Fenley for Henley Hawks away to Dings Crusaders on 30 November 2019

Most conversions in a match — 9 (3)

(England) Ben Bolster for Henley Hawks at home to Worthing Raiders on 5 October 2019
(England) Will Robinson for Tonbridge Juddians at home to Taunton Titans on 5 October 2019
(England) Will Robinson for Tonbridge Juddians at home to Sutton & Epsom on 21 December 2019

Most penalties in a match — 5 (3)

(Wales) Matthew McLean for Worthing Raiders at home to Old Redcliffians on 7 September 2019
(England) Gary Kingdom for Taunton Titans at home to Bury St Edmunds on 23 November 2019

Most drop goals in a match — 1 (3)

(Cornwall) Fraser Honey for Redruth at home to Old Redcliffians on 30 November 2019
(Australia) Kodie Drury-Hawkins for Bury St Edmunds at home to Tonbridge Juddians on 14 December 2019
(England) Ben Young for Leicester Lions away to Old Redcliffians on 7 March 2020

== See also ==
- 2019–20 National League 2 North
- 2019–20 National League 1
- English rugby union system
- Rugby union in England
