= Gary Kingdom =

- Born: 2 November 1982 (age 44)
- Height: 6 ft 2 in (1.88 m)

Rugby union career
- Position(s): Full back, Centre, Wing
- Current team: Taunton Titans
Senior career
Years	Team	Apps	(Points)
2002–09	Exeter Chiefs	121	(304)
2008–09	Launceston	17	(42)
2009–10	Plymouth Albion	28	(5)
2010–	Taunton Titans	245	(1979)
- Correct as of 27 April 2019

Gary Kingdom (born 2 November 1982) is an English rugby union player who can play in a variety of positions most notably at Full back or Centre. He is currently playing for Taunton Titans in National League 2 South (tier 4 of the English rugby union league system) but has played higher level rugby for both Exeter Chiefs and Plymouth Albion as well as representing the Devon county rugby side with whom he has won the County Championship twice. Kingdom has become an excellent points kicker over his career and is (as of the end of the 2018–19 season), the second highest all-time points scorer in National League 2 South with over 1,900 points for Taunton. As well as playing, Kingdom is also employed by the RFU as a community rugby coach for the South Devon region.

== Career ==
Kingdom grew up in South Devon, playing for his local rugby club, Kingsbridge, and attended Blundell's School in Tiverton. After finishing school in 2001 he went on to study Sports and Exercise Science at the University of Gloucestershire. While at university, Kingdom caught the eye of Premiership side Bath Rugby and spent a season and a half with their academy. Kingdom was unable to break into the Bath first team and in 2003 signed for second division side Exeter Chiefs, combining semi-professional rugby with his university studies. A bit part player in his first couple of seasons, Kingdom was nevertheless called up to represent Devon in the 2004 County Championship playing in the final at Twickenham Stadium as his county won the cup for the first time since 1957 by beating Gloucestershire 43–14.

After winning the county championships the 2004–05 season saw Kingdom become a first team regular, making over 20 league appearances and scoring 9 tries, in an Exeter side that finished second to Bristol Shoguns and narrowly missed out on promotion to the Premiership. He was picked by Devon once again for the 2005 County Championships, scoring a try during the final at Twickenham, which Devon won 22–16 against Lancashire to retain their title. A further return to Twickenham with Devon the following season seeking a third successive county championship victory, would this time end in disappointment for Kingdom and his side, as Lancashire gained revenge for the previous year by winning 32–26.

The next couple of seasons would see Kingdom continue to play regularly for the Chiefs as they skirted the upper echelons of the second division. In 2008 he would also make an appearance in the final of the EDF Energy Trophy where the Chiefs lost to 13–24 at Twickenham to Northampton Saints, a side that not only won promotion back to the Premiership but also finished undefeated in all league and cup games that season. The 2008–09 season would see Kingdom getting less game time at the Chiefs and he decided to drop down a division to go on loan at Launceston, helping the Cornish side to a mid-table finish.

After six seasons with Exeter, Kingdom left the club to sign with local rivals, Plymouth Albion for the 2009–10 season in what was the first year of the new RFU Championship. Kingdom only spent one season at Albion, despite being a regular, as the side failed to make the league playoffs, finishing 8th, and in 2010 he dropped down two divisions to return to semi-professional rugby with the Taunton Titans in National League 2 South. While playing for Taunton Kingdom has become one of the most prolific points scorers in the division, topping the season scoring charts twice. He has also combined his playing career with Taunton with coaching duties and in 2012 he was given a community coaching role by the RFU, being responsible for the south Devon region.

== Season-by-season playing stats ==
Season	Club	Competition	Appearances	Tries	Drop Goals	Conversions	Penalties	Total Points
2002–03	Exeter Chiefs	National Division One	11	5	0	0	0	25
2002–03	Exeter Chiefs	Powergen Shield	2	0	0	0	0	0
2003–04	Exeter Chiefs	National Division One	8	0	0	0	2	6
2003–04	Exeter Chiefs	Powergen Cup	1	0	0	0	0	0
2004–05	Exeter Chiefs	National Division One	21	9	0	6	1	60
2004–05	Exeter Chiefs	Powergen Cup	3	3	0	0	0	15
2005–06	Exeter Chiefs	National Division One	21	8	0	4	9	75
2005–06	Exeter Chiefs	Powergen National Trophy	3	2	0	0	0	10
2006–07	Exeter Chiefs	National Division One	24	7	0	0	1	38
2006–07	Exeter Chiefs	EDF Energy National Cup	5	2	0	0	0	10
2007–08	Exeter Chiefs	National Division One	14	2	0	15	2	46
2007–08	Exeter Chiefs	EDF Energy National Trophy	5	1	0	4	4	25
2008–09	Exeter Chiefs	National Division One	3	0	0	0	0	0
2008–09	Launceston	National Division Two	16	6	0	6	0	42
2008–09	Launceston	EDF Energy National Trophy	1	0	0	0	0	0
2009–10	Plymouth Albion	RFU Championship (Note: Includes 2009–10 RFU Championship playoff games.)	25	1	0	0	0	5
2009–10	Plymouth Albion	British & Irish Cup	3	0	0	0	0	0
2010–11	Taunton Titans	National League 2 South	27	9	0	52	28	233
2011–12	Taunton Titans	National League 2 South	30	5	0	9	6	61
2012–13	Taunton Titans	National League 2 South	27	10	0	52	20	214
2013–14	Taunton Titans	National League 2 South	26	1	0	45	29	182
2014–15	Taunton Titans	National League 2 South	29	5	1	69	47	307
2015–16	Taunton Titans	National League 2 South	29	4	1	82	32	283
2016–17	Taunton Titans	National League 2 South	30	6	0	84	31	291
2017–18	Taunton Titans	National League 2 South	22	7	0	70	19	232
2018–19	Taunton Titans	National League 2 South	25	1	0	60	17	176

== Honours and records ==
Exeter Chiefs

- EDF Energy Trophy finalist: 2008

Taunton Titans

- National League 2 South champions: 2019–20
- National League 2 South top points scorer (3): 2014–15 (307 points), 2015–16 (283 points), 2019–20 (230 points)

Devon

- County Championship winner (2): 2004, 2005
- County Championship runner up: 2006
