= Tom White (rugby union) =

Scotland international rugby union player

- Born: Thomas Brown White; 1 March 1866 Cumnock, Scotland
- Died: 5 July 1939 (aged 73) Moffat, Scotland
- Occupation: Physician

Rugby union career
- Position: Forward
Amateur team(s)
Years	Team	Apps	(Points)
- Edinburgh Academicals
Provincial / State sides
Years	Team	Apps	(Points)
1887	Edinburgh District		
1888	East of Scotland District		
International career
Years	Team	Apps	(Points)
1888-89	Scotland	3	(0)

Thomas Brown White (1 March 1866 – 5 July 1939) was a Scotland international rugby union player and physician.

== Rugby Union career ==
=== Amateur career ===
He was schooled at Edinburgh Academy.

He played for Edinburgh Academicals.

=== Provincial career ===
He played for Edinburgh District against Glasgow District in the inter-city match of 1887.

He played for East of Scotland District in their match against West of Scotland District in February 1888.

=== International career ===
He was capped three times for Scotland, in the period 1888 to 1889.

== Business career ==
He worked on the P & O Shipping Line.

== Military career ==
In the First World War he served with the Royal Navy.

== Medical career ==
White went to Edinburgh University to study medicine. He graduated with a M. B. and C. M. in 1888. White became a surgeon, first at the County Hospital in Ayr, then started his own practice in Moffat as a G.P. in 1894. With the exception of the war years, the last 45 years of his life were spent in Moffat.

== Other interests ==
White was a noted Freemason. He also like golf and curling.

== Family ==
His father was Andrew White (1828–1879) and his mother was Janet Young (1831–1869). Andrew White was a solicitor and bank clerk in Cumnock. Tom was one of their seven children.

He married Isabelle Constance Megret (1869–1942) in Edinburgh in February 1901. They had one daughter, Anita Louise White, a figure skater who represented France at the 1928 Winter Olympics.

== Death ==
White, who had otherwise been in good health, suddenly fell ill and died on 5 July 1939, aged 73.
