= Hugo Ellis =

English rugby union player

- Born: 4 February 1988 (age 38) Isleworth, London
- Height: 190 cm (6 ft 3 in)
- Weight: 106 kg (16 st 10 lb; 234 lb)
- School: St Benedict's School
- University: Royal Holloway, University of London
- Notable relative: Arthur Ellis (brother)

Rugby union career
- Position: Number 8
- Current team: Rosslyn Park
Senior career
Years	Team	Apps	(Points)
2006	Blackheath	1	(0)
2007, 2012-	Rosslyn Park	140	(490)
2007-10	Wasps	18	(0)
2007-08	London Welsh	12	(15)
2010-12	Dragons	13	(5)
2010-12	Newport	29	(60)
- Correct as of 12 May 2018

Hugo Ellis (born 4 February 1988, in Isleworth, London, England) is a rugby union player who plays as a back-row forward for Rosslyn Park. He is a former pupil of St Benedict's School, Ealing.

In June 2010 Ellis joined Newport Gwent Dragons. He was released by Newport Gwent Dragons at the end of the 2011–12 season.

As well as playing club rugby, Ellis has also been capped by England U-20 – helping them to win the 2008 U-20 Six Nations title.

His brother Arthur Ellis is also a rugby player, currently with Ealing Trailinders, while their father Wyn Ellis played for Neath.

== Season-by-season playing stats ==
=== Club ===
Season	Club	Competition	Appearances	Tries	Drop Goals	Conversions	Penalties	Total Points
2006-07	Blackheath	EDF Energy Trophy	1	1	0	0	0	5
2006-07	Rosslyn Park	National Division 3 South	2	1	0	0	0	5
2007-08	Wasps	Guinness Premiership	2	0	0	0	0	0
2007-08	Wasps	EDF Energy Cup	0	0	0	0	0	0
2007-08	London Welsh	National Division 1	7	2	0	0	0	10
2008-09	London Welsh	National Division 1	5	1	0	0	0	5
2008-09	Wasps	Guinness Premiership	7	0	0	0	0	0
2008-09	Wasps	EDF Energy Cup	1	0	0	0	0	0
2009-10	Wasps	Guinness Premiership	2	0	0	0	0	0
2009-10	Wasps	European Challenge Cup	2	0	0	0	0	0
2009-10	Wasps	EDF Energy Cup	4	0	0	0	0	0
2010-11	Dragons	Magners League	4	1	0	0	0	5
2010-11	Dragons	Heineken Cup	0	0	0	0	0	0
2010-11	Dragons	LV Cup	3	0	0	0	0	0
2010-11	Newport	Principality Premiership	15	8	0	0	0	40
2010-11	Newport	British and Irish Cup	3	2	0	0	0	10
2010-11	Newport	SWALEC Cup	1	0	0	0	0	0
2011-12	Dragons	Magners League	4	0	0	0	0	0
2011-12	Dragons	LV Cup	2	0	0	0	0	0
2011-12	Newport	Principality Premiership	10	2	0	0	0	10
2011-12	Newport	SWALEC Cup	0	0	0	0	0	0
2012-13	Rosslyn Park	National League 1	25	26	0	0	0	130
2013-14	Rosslyn Park	National League 1	25	10	0	0	0	50
2014-15	Rosslyn Park	National League 1	25	23	0	0	0	115
2015-16	Rosslyn Park	National League 1	23	25	0	0	0	125
2016-17	Rosslyn Park	National League 1	24	6	0	0	0	30
2017-18	Rosslyn Park	National League 1	16	7	0	0	0	35

=== International/County/Representative ===
Season	Side	Competition	Appearances	Tries	Drop Goals	Conversions	Penalties	Total Points
2007-08	England U-20	2008 U-20 Six Nations	4	2	0	0	0	10

== Honours/Records ==
England under-20s

- Six Nations U-20 champions: 2008
