= 2010–11 WRU Challenge Cup =

The 2010–11 WRU Challenge Cup, known for sponsorship reasons as the SWALEC Cup, is the 41st WRU Challenge Cup, the annual national rugby union cup competition of Wales. The competition was won by Pontypridd who beat Aberavon 35 – 24 in the final.

== Calendar ==
Stage	Date
Round 1	11 December 2010
Round 2	29 January 2011
Round 3	19 February 2011
Quarter-finals	26 March 2011
Semi-finals	9 April 2011
Final	2 May 2011

== Matches ==
=== Round 1 ===
Home team	Score	Away team
Bridgend	40 – 10	Whitland
Bridgend Athletic	18 – 12	Gilfach Goch
Felinfoel	11 – 5	Treorchy
Llangennech	22 – 23	Carmarthen Athletic
Llanharan	20 – 19	Narberth
Rumney	7 – 15	Bonymaen
Ystrad Rhondda	12 – 16	Waunarlwydd

=== Round 2 ===
Home team	Score	Away team
Aberavon	74 – 6	Bedlinog
Bargoed	5 – 14	Neath
Beddau	28 – 35	Cardiff
Bridgend	27 – 6	Ebbw Vale
Bridgend Athletic	8 – 17	Pontypridd
Carmarthen Athletic	7 – 18	Bedwas
Cross Keys	22 – 29	Swansea
Felinfoel	15 – 74	Newport
Glamorgan Wanderers	41 – 36	Corus
Llandovery	14 – 12	Llanharan
Maesteg	0 – 50	Carmarthen Quins
Merthyr	33 – 21	Newbridge
Tonmawr	31 – 8	Llanelli
UWIC	23 – 26	Pontypool
Waunarlwydd	34 – 31	Bonymaen

=== Round 3 ===
Home team	Score	Away team
Cardiff	30 – 20	Bridgend
Glamorgan Wanderers	19 – 26	Merthyr
Llandovery	20 – 19	Carmarthen Quins
Newport	69 – 17	Blackwood
Pontypridd	36 – 26	Neath
Swansea	32 – 14	Bedwas
Tonmawr	31 – 8	Pontypool
Waunarlwydd	19 – 33	Aberavon

== Finals ==
=== Quarter-finals ===
Home team	Score	Away team
Cardiff	17 – 19	Aberavon
Merthyr	30 – 38	Pontypridd
Swansea	39 – 34	Newport
Tonmawr	13 – 23	Llandovery

=== Semi-finals ===
Team 1	Score	Team 2
Pontypridd	33 – 22	Swansea
Llandovery	12 – 18	Aberavon

=== Final ===
Team 1	Score	Team 2
Pontypridd	35 – 24	Aberavon

Top Half

Round of 32
Glamorgan Wanderers	41
Corus	36
Merthyr	33
Newbridge	21
Bridgend Athletic	8
Pontypridd	17
Bargoed	5
Neath	14
Cross Keys	22
Swansea	29
Carmarthen Athletic	7
Bedwas	18
Felinfoel	15
Newport	74
Blackwood	Bye

Round of 16
Glamorgan Wanderers	19
Merthyr	26
Pontypridd	36
Neath	26
Swansea	32
Bedwas	14
Newport	69
Blackwood	17

Quarterfinals
Merthyr	30
Pontypridd	38
Swansea	39
Newport	34

Semifinals
Pontypridd	33
Swansea	22

Bottom Half

Round of 32
Tonmawr	31
Llanelli	8
UWIC	23
Pontypool	26
Llandovery	14
Llanharan	12
Maesteg	0
Carmarthen Quins	50
Beddau	28
Cardiff	35
Bridgend	27
Ebbw Vale	6
Waunarlwydd	34
Bonymaen	31
Aberavon	74
Bedlinog	6

Round of 16
Tonmawr	31
Pontypool	8
Llandovery	20
Carmarthen Quins	19
Cardiff	30
Bridgend	20
Waunarlwydd	19
Aberavon	33

Quarterfinals
Tonmawr	13
Llandovery	23
Cardiff	17
Aberavon	19

Semifinals
Llandovery	12
Aberavon	18

Quarter-finals
26 March – The Wern
Merthyr	30
Pontypridd	38
26 March – St Helens
Swansea	39
Newport	34
26 March – Whitworth Ground
Tonmawr	13
Llandovery	23
26 March – Cardiff Arms Park
Cardiff	17
Aberavon	19

Semi-finals
9 April – Cardiff
Pontypridd	33
Swansea	22
9 April – Carmarthen
Llandovery	12
Aberavon	18

Final
2 May – Millennium Stadium, Cardiff
Pontypridd	35
Aberavon	24

Preceded by 2009–10	WRU Challenge Cup; 2010–11	Succeeded by 2011–12

== See also ==
- WRU Challenge Cup
- 2010–11 WRU Challenge Cup: Tier 2
- 2010–11 WRU Challenge Cup: Tier 3
