= 2014–15 National League 1 =

Rugby union competition in England

- Countries: England
- Date: 6 September 2014 – 25 April 2015
- Champions: Ealing Trailfinders
- Runners-up: Rosslyn Park
- Relegated: Old Albanian, Macclesfield and Tynedale
- Matches played: 240
- Attendance: 142,368 (average 593 per match)
- Highest attendance: 2,278 Ealing Trailfinders at home to Rosslyn Park on 18 April
- Lowest attendance: 128 Cinderford at home to Old Albanian on 8 November
- Tries scored: 1606 (average 6.7 per match)
- Top point scorer: (England) Rob Kirby (Richmond) 270
- Top try scorer: (England) Phil Chesters (Ealing Trailfinders) 33

The 2014–15 National League 1, known for sponsorship reasons as the SSE National League 1 is the sixth season of the third tier of the English domestic rugby union competitions, since the professionalised format of the second tier RFU Championship was introduced; and is the twenty-eighth season since league rugby began in 1987. Ealing Trailfinders are the champions and return to the 2015–16 RFU Championship following their relegation from that league last season. The last three clubs are relegated; Old Albanian to National League 2 South, and Tynedale and Macclesfield to National League 2 North

== Structure ==
The league consists of sixteen teams with all the teams playing each other on a home and away basis to make a total of thirty matches each. There is one promotion place and three relegation places. The champions are promoted to the Greene King IPA Championship and the bottom three teams are relegated to either National League 2 North or National League 2 South depending on the geographical location of the team.

== Participating teams and locations ==
National 1 teams in England
Greater London National League 1 clubs

Twelve of the sixteen teams participated in last season's competition. The 2013–14 champions Doncaster Knights were promoted to the RFU Championship and are replaced by Ealing Trailfinders who only spent one season in the league above. The three relegated teams were all promoted in 2012–13 and stayed one season in National League 1; Henley Hawks and Worthing Raiders are relegated to National League 2 South and Hull Ionians to National League 2 North. The promoted teams are Hartpury College and Macclesfield champions of National League 2 South and National League 2 North respectively, and Darlington Mowden Park who won the promotion play-off against Ampthill & District.

Team	Ground	Capacity	City/Area	Previous season
Blackheath	Rectory Field	3,500 (500 seats)	Blackheath, London	10th
Blaydon	Crow Trees	2,000 (400 seats)	Swalwell, Tyne and Wear	6th
Cinderford	Dockham Road	2,500	Cinderford, Gloucestershire	11th
Coventry	Butts Park Arena	4,000 (3,000 seats)	Coventry, West Midlands	4th
Darlington Mowden Park	Northern Echo Arena	25,000	Darlington, County Durham	Promoted from the 2013–14 National League 2 North (playoffs)
Ealing Trailfinders	Trailfinders Sports Ground	3,020 (1,200 seats)	West Ealing, London	Relegated from the 2013–14 RFU Championship
Esher	Molesey Road	3,000 (1,200 seats)	Hersham, Surrey	5th
Fylde	Woodlands Memorial Ground	7,500 (500 seats)	Lytham St. Annes, Lancashire	3rd
Hartpury College	College Stadium	2,000	Hartpury, Gloucestershire	Promoted from the 2013–14 National League 2 South (champions)
Loughborough Students	Loughborough University Stadium	3,000	Loughborough, Leicestershire	12th
Macclesfield	Priory Park	1,250 (250 seats)	Macclesfield, Cheshire	Promoted from the 2013–14 National League 2 North (champions)
Old Albanian	Woollam Playing Fields	1,000	St Albans, Hertfordshire	9th
Richmond	Athletic Ground, Richmond	4,500 (1,000 seats)	Richmond, London	7th
Rosslyn Park	The Rock	2,000 (630 seats)	Roehampton, London	2nd
Tynedale	Tynedale Park	2,000 (400 seats)	Corbridge, Northumberland	13th
Wharfedale	The Avenue	2,000	Threshfield, North Yorkshire	8th

== League table ==
2014–15 National League 1 table
Pos	Team	Pld	W	D	L	PF	PA	PD	TB	LB	Pts	Qualification
1	Ealing Trailfinders (C)	30	27	0	3	1099	518	+581	25	3	136	Promoted
2	Rosslyn Park	30	26	0	4	909	508	+401	20	3	127	
3	Coventry	30	22	1	7	1011	694	+317	16	6	112	
4	Fylde	30	16	2	12	844	738	+106	18	4	90	
5	Hartpury College	30	19	0	11	784	685	+99	10	3	89	
6	Blackheath	30	16	1	13	758	731	+27	16	4	86	
7	Richmond	30	14	2	14	837	866	−29	15	5	80	
8	Blaydon	30	13	0	17	666	693	−27	13	8	73	
9	Darlington Mowden Park	30	13	1	16	782	732	+50	14	6	69 (Note: Darlington Mowden Park deducted 5 points after selecting an unregistered player on 13 September 2014 against Wharfedale.)	
10	Esher	30	12	1	17	720	738	−18	11	7	68	
11	Wharfedale	30	12	1	17	595	801	−206	11	4	65	
12	Loughborough Students	30	11	0	19	681	709	−28	12	7	63	
13	Cinderford	30	11	0	19	606	686	−80	10	5	59	
14	Old Albanian	30	12	1	17	688	771	−83	9	4	58 (Note: Old Albanian deducted 5 points after selecting two unregistered players on 31 January 2015 against Fylde)	Relegated
15	Tynedale	30	8	0	22	593	999	−406	6	5	43	Relegated
16	Macclesfield	30	3	0	27	481	1185	−704	6	3	21	Relegated

Updated to match(es) played on 25 April 2015. Source: "National League 1". NCA Rugby.
Rules for classification: If teams are level at any stage, tiebreakers are applied in the following order:
1. Number of matches won
2. Difference between points for and against
3. Total number of points for
4. Aggregate number of points scored in matches between tied teams
5. Number of matches won excluding the first match, then the second and so on until the tie is settled
  (C) Champion
  Notes:

== Fixtures ==
=== Round 1 ===
6 September 2014
14:30

(BP) Hartpury College	25 – 30	Wharfedale

College Stadium
Attendance: 350
Referee: Shane Lewis

6 September 2014
15:00

(BP) Coventry	30 – 32	Rosslyn Park (BP)

Butts Park Arena
Attendance: 1,391
Referee: Andrew Rawson

6 September 2014
15:00

(BP) Darlington Mowden Park	23 – 24	Blaydon

Northern Echo Arena
Attendance: 1,250
Referee: James Leahy

6 September 2014
15:00

(BP) Ealing Trailfinders	22 – 10	Loughborough Students

Trailfinders Sports Ground
Attendance: 320
Referee: Robert Warburton

6 September 2014
15:00

(BP) Esher	36 – 20	Cinderford

Molesey Road
Attendance: 362
Referee: Fergus Kirby

6 September 2014
15:00

(BP) Fylde	31 – 16	Blackheath

Woodlands Memorial Ground
Attendance: 875
Referee: David Procter

6 September 2014
15:00

Macclesfield	22 – 35	Richmond (BP)

Priory Park
Attendance: 637
Referee: Gareth Hosgrove

6 September 2014
15:00

Tynedale	11 – 10	Old Albanian (BP)

Tynedale Park
Attendance: 297
Referee: Llyr Apgeraint-Roberts

=== Round 2 ===
13 September 2014
14:00

(2BP) Loughborough Students	27 – 30	Coventry

Loughborough University Stadium
Attendance: 372
Referee: Fergus Kirby

13 September 2014
14:30

(BP) Blaydon	15 – 20	Tynedale

Crow Trees
Attendance: 610
Referee: Andrew Rawson

13 September 2014
14:30

Cinderford	10 – 23	Hartpury College

Dockham Road
Attendance: 560
Referee: Marcus Caton

13 September 2014
15:00

Macclesfield	0 – 47	Fylde (BP)

Priory Park
Attendance: 367
Referee: Jamie Leahy

13 September 2014
15:00

Old Albanian	30 – 47	Ealing Trailfinders (BP)

Woollam Playing Fields
Attendance: 429
Referee: Veryan Boscawen

13 September 2014
15:00

Richmond	30 – 25	Esher (BP)

Athletic Ground
Attendance: 743
Referee: Simon Harding

13 September 2014
15:00

(BP) Rosslyn Park	31 – 25	Blackheath (2BP)

The Rock
Attendance: 501
Referee: Rob Warburton

13 September 2014
15:00

(BP) Wharfedale	32 – 18	Darlington Mowden Park

The Avenue
Attendance: 730
Referee: Gareth Holsgrove

=== Round 3 ===
20 September 2014
14:30

(BP) Ealing Trailfinders	36 – 7	Blaydon

Trailfinders Sports Ground
Attendance: 275
Referee: Shane Lewis

20 September 2014
14:30

Hartpury College	17 – 59	Richmond (BP)

College Stadium
Attendance: 350
Referee: Philip Davies

20 September 2014
15:00

(BP) Blackheath	29 – 19	Loughborough Students

Rectory Field
Attendance: 532
Referee: James Sullivan

20 September 2014
15:00

(BP) Coventry	37 – 16	Old Albanian

Butts Park Arena
Attendance: 1,025
Referee: Matt O'Grady

20 September 2014
15:00

(BP) Darlington Mowden Park	32 – 24	Cinderford (BP)

Northern Echo Arena
Attendance: 970
Referee: Llyr Apgeraint Roberts

20 September 2014
15:00

(BP) Esher	53 – 15	Macclesfield

Molesey Road
Attendance: 478
Referee: Thomas Davis

20 September 2014
15:00

Fylde	22 – 17	Rosslyn Park (BP)

Woodlands Memorial Ground
Attendance: 735
Referee: Andrew Taylorson

20 September 2014
15:00

Tynedale	20 – 17	Wharfedale (BP)

Tynedale Park
Attendance: 500
Referee: Wayne Falla

=== Round 4 ===
27 September 2014
14:00

(BP) Loughborough Students	27 – 36	Rosslyn Park (BP)

Loughborough University Stadium
Attendance: 310
Referee: Greg Macdonald

27 September 2014
14:30

Blaydon	21 – 16	Coventry (BP)

Crow Trees
Attendance: 339
Referee: Marcus Caton

27 September 2014
14:30

(BP) Cinderford	32 – 28	Tynedale (BP)

Dockham Road
Attendance: 287
Referee: James Sullivan

27 September 2014
15:00

(BP) Esher	29 – 28	Fylde (2BP)

Molesey Road
Attendance: 450
Referee: Phillip Davies

27 September 2014
15:00

Macclesfield	3 – 41	Hartpury College (BP)

Priory Park
Attendance: 237
Referee: Andrew Rawson

27 September 2014
15:00

Old Albanian	12 – 35	Blackheath (BP)

Woollam Playing Fields
Attendance: 320
Referee: Fergus Kirby

27 September 2014
15:00

(BP) Richmond	30 – 27	Darlington Mowden Park (2BP)

Athletic Ground
Attendance: 758
Referee: Robert Warburton

27 September 2014
15:00

Wharfedale	8 – 21	Ealing Trailfinders

The Avenue
Attendance: 610
Referee: James Leahy

=== Round 5 ===
4 October 2014
14:30

Hartpury College	30 – 19	Esher

College Stadium
Attendance: 350
Referee: Veryan Boscawen

4 October 2014
15:00

Blackheath	12 – 29	Blaydon

Rectory Field
Attendance: 514
Referee: Gareth Holsgrove

4 October 2014
15:00

(BP) Coventry	53 – 26	Wharfedale (BP)

Butts Park Arena
Attendance: 1,076
Referee: Robert Warburton

4 October 2014
15:00

(BP) Darlington Mowden Park	41 – 12	Macclesfield

Northern Echo Arena
Attendance: 835
Referee: Marcus Caton

4 October 2014
15:00

(BP) Ealing Trailfinders	28 – 12	Cinderford

Trailfinders Sports Ground
Attendance: 498
Referee: Matthew O'Grady

4 October 2014
15:00

(BP) Fylde	43 – 25	Loughborough Students (BP)

Molesey Road
Attendance: 675
Referee: Llyr ApGeraint Roberts

4 October 2014
15:00

(BP) Rosslyn Park	38 – 3	Old Albanian

Prory Lane
Attendance: 409
Referee: John Meredith

4 October 2014
15:00

Tynedale	19 – 30	Richmond (BP)

Tynedale Park
Attendance: 452
Referee: Jamie Leahy

=== Round 6 ===
11 October 2014
14:30

(BP) Blaydon	29 – 38	Rosslyn Park (BP)

Crow Trees
Attendance: 257
Referee: Marcus Caton

11 October 2014
14:30

(BP) Cinderford	11 – 15	Coventry

Dockham Road
Attendance: 318
Referee: Gareth Holsgrove

11 October 2014
14:30

Hartpury College	24 – 32	Fylde (BP)

College Stadium
Attendance: 385
Referee: Andrew Taylorson

11 October 2014
15:00

(BP) Esher	32 – 19	Darlington Mowden Park

Molesey Road
Attendance: 650
Referee: James Sullivan

11 October 2014
15:00

Macclesfield	24 – 60	Tynedale (BP)

Priory Park
Attendance: 220
Referee: Andrew Jackson

11 October 2014
15:00

Old Albanian	13 – 28	Loughborough Students

Woollam Playing Fields
Attendance: 312
Referee: Veryan Boscawen

11 October 2014
15:00

Richmond	16 – 26	Ealing Trailfinders (BP)

Athletic Ground
Attendance: 1,403
Referee: Shane Lewis

11 October 2014
15:00

Wharfedale	12 – 52	Blackheath (BP)

The Avenue
Attendance: 612
Referee: Phillip Davies

=== Round 7 ===
18 October 2014
14:00

(BP) Loughborough Students	36 – 8	Blaydon

Loughborough University Stadium
Attendance: 310
Referee: Gareth Holsgrove

18 October 2014
14:30

(BP) Tynedale	24 – 20	Esher (BP)

Tynedale Park
Attendance: 455
Referee: Marcus Caton

18 October 2014
15:00

(BP) Blackheath	38 – 29	Cinderford (BP)

Rectory Field
Attendance: 638
Referee: Robert Warburton

18 October 2014
15:00

(BP) Coventry	48 – 27	Richmond (BP)

Butts Park Arena
Attendance: 1,374
Referee: Tom Foley

18 October 2014
15:00

(BP) Darlington Mowden Park	21 – 28	Hartpury College (BP)

Northern Echo Arena
Attendance: 902
Referee: Shane Lewis

18 October 2014
15:00

{BP} Ealing Trailfinders	73 – 15	Macclesfield

Trailfinders Sports Ground
Attendance: 312
Referee: James Sullivan

18 October 2014
15:00

(BP) Fylde	33 – 25	Old Albanian (BP)

Woodlands Memorial Ground
Attendance: 640
Referee: James Clarke

18 October 2014
15:00

(BP) Rosslyn Park	49 – 26	Wharfedale (BP)

The Rock
Attendance: 536
Referee: Tom Davis

=== Round 8 ===
25 October 2014
14:30

(BP) Blaydon	32 – 19	Old Albanian

Crow Trees
Attendance: 267
Referee: Andrew Taylorson

25 October 2014
14:30

(BP) Cinderford	17 – 19	Rosslyn Park

Dockham Road
Attendance: 412
Referee: Veryan Boscawen

25 October 2014
14:30

(BP) Hartpury College	53 – 12	Tynedale

College Stadium
Attendance: 330
Referee: Gareth Holsgrove

25 October 2014
15:00

Darlington Mowden Park	29 – 29	Fylde (BP)

Northern Echo Arena
Attendance: 878
Referee: Tom Davis

25 October 2014
15:00

Esher	5 – 22	Ealing Trailfinders

Molesey Road
Attendance: 789
Referee: Phillip Davies

25 October 2014
15:00

Macclesfield	13 – 21	Coventry

Priory Park
Attendance: 363
Referee: Andrew Rawson

25 October 2014
15:00

(BP) Richmond	36 – 27	Blackheath (BP)

Athletic Ground
Attendance: 962
Referee: Richard Kelly

25 October 2014
15:00

(BP) Wharfeldale	38 – 20	Loughborough Students

Threshdale
Attendance: 628
Referee: James Clarke

=== Round 9 ===
1 November 2014
14:00

Loughborough Students	25 – 15	Cinderford

Loughborough University Stadium
Attendance: 358
Referee: Rob Warburton

1 November 2014
14:00

Tynedale	19 – 53	Darlington Mowden Park (BP)

Tynedale Park
Attendance: 500
Referee: Veryan Boscawen

1 November 2014
15:00

(BP) Blackheath	34 – 0	Macclesfield

Rectory Field
Attendance: 583
Referee: James Clarke

1 November 2014
15:00

(BP) Coventry	33 – 31	Esher (2BP)

Butts Park Arena
Attendance: 1,354
Referee: Marcus Caton

1 November 2014
15:00

(BP) Ealing Trailfinders	50 – 17	Hartpury College

Trailfinders Sports Ground
Attendance: 322
Referee: Fergus Kirby

1 November 2014
15:00

(BP) Fylde	42 – 24	Blaydon

Woodlands Memorial Ground
Attendance: 724
Referee: Andrew Rawson

1 November 2014
15:00

(BP) Old Albanian	31 – 7	Wharfedale

Woolham Playing Fields
Attendance: 340
Referee: Gareth Holsgrove

1 November 2014
15:00

Rosslyn Park	28 – 15	Richmond

The Rock
Attendance: 1,598
Referee: Jamie Leahy

=== Round 10 ===
8 November 2014
14:00

Tynedale	9 – 8	Fylde (BP)

Tynedale Park
Attendance: 350
Referee: Tim Wigglesworth

8 November 2014
14:00

Wharfedale	15 – 12	Blaydon (BP)

The Avenue
Attendance: 366
Referee: Philip Davies

8 November 2014
14:30

(BP) Cinderford	8 – 14	Old Albanian

Dockham Park
Attendance: 128
Referee: Andrew Rawson

8 November 2014
14:30

(BP) Hartpury College	21 – 23	Coventry

College Stadium
Attendance: 180
Referee: Marcus Caton

8 November 2014
15:00

(BP) Darlington Mowden Park	14 – 21	Ealing Trailfinders

Northern Echo Arena
Attendance: 948
Referee: James Clarke

8 November 2014
15:00

Esher	24 – 18	Blackheath (BP)

Molesey Road
Attendance: 307
Referee: Robert Warbuton

8 November 2014
15:00

Macclesfield	7 – 36	Rosslyn Park (BP)

Priory Park
Attendance: 237
Referee: Llyr ApGeriant-Roberts

8 November 2014
15:00

(BP) Richmond	24 – 22	Loughborough Students

Athletic Ground
Attendance: 226
Referee: Gareth Holsgrove

=== Round 11 ===
14 November 2014
19:45

Rosslyn Park	27 – 10	Esher

The Rock
Attendance: 1,500
Referee: Veryan Boscawen

15 November 2014
14:00

(BP) Blaydon	46 – 5	Cinderford

Crow Trees
Attendance: 210
Referee: James Clarke

15 November 2014
14:00

(BP) Loughborough Students	27 – 29	Macclesfield (BP)

Loughborough University Stadium
Attendance: 220
Referee: Andrew Rawson

15 November 2014
15:00

(BP) Blackheath	29 – 24	Hartpury College (BP)

Rectory Field
Attendance: 678
Referee: Gareth Holsgrove

15 November 2014
15:00

(BP) Coventry	29 – 17	Darlington Mowden Park

Butts Park Arena
Attendance: 1,125
Referee: Matthew O'Grady

15 November 2014
15:00

(BP) Ealing Trailfinders	64 – 43	Tynedale (BP)

Trailfinder Sports Ground
Attendance: 312
Referee: Rob Warburton

15 November 2014
15:00

(BP) Fylde	35 – 3	Wharfedale

Woodlands Memorial Ground
Attendance: 746
Referee: Jamie Ledhey

15 November 2014
15:00

Old Albanian	13 – 10	Richmond (BP)

Woollam Playing Fields
Attendance: 340
Referee: Fergus Kirby

=== Round 12 ===
22 November 2014
14:00

Tynedale	21 – 57	Coventry (BP)

Tynedale Park
Attendance: 350
Referee: Jamie Leahy

22 November 2014
14:30

(BP) Cinderford	27 – 17	Wharfedale

Dockham Road
Attendance: 232
Referee: Jake Makepeace

22 November 2014
14:30

Hartpury College	10 – 31	Rosslyn Park (BP)

College Stadium
Attendance: 430
Referee: Shane Lewis

22 November 2014
14:30

(BP) Richmond	29 – 28	Blaydon (2BP)

Athletic Ground, Richmond
Attendance: 462
Referee: Robert Warburton

22 November 2014
15:00

(BP) Darlington Mowden Park	50 – 10	Blackheath

Northern Echo Arena
Attendance: 1,016
Referee: Marcus Caton

22 November 2014
15:00

(BP) Ealing Trailfinders	56 – 15	Fylde

Trailfinders Sports Ground
Attendance: 512
Referee: Matthew O'Grady

22 November 2014
15:00

Esher	19 – 17	Loughborough Students (BP)

Molesey Road
Attendance: 417
Referee: James Clarke

22 November 2014
15:00

Macclesfield	17 – 51	Old Albanian (BP)

Priory Park
Attendance: 278
Referee: Veryan Boscawen

=== Round 13 ===
28 November 2014
19:30

(BP) Loughborough Students	30 – 13	Hartpury College

Loughborough University Stadium
Attendance: 1,550
Referee: Andrew Rawson

29 November 2014
14:00

(BP) Blaydon	39 – 0	Macclesfield

Crow Trees
Attendance: 342
Referee: Jamie Leahy

29 November 2014
14:00

(BP) Wharfedale	29 – 19	Richmond

The Avenue
Attendance: 381
Referee: Cammie Rudkin

29 November 2014
15:00

(BP) Blackheath	48 – 7	Tynedale

Rectory Field
Attendance: 473
Referee: Jake Makepeace

29 November 2014
15:00

(BP) Coventry	32 – 26	Ealing Trailfinders (2BP)

Butts Park Arena
Attendance: 1,480
Referee: Veryan Boscawen

29 November 2014
15:00

(BP) Fylde	35 – 11	Cinderford

Woodlands Memorial Ground
Attendance: 657
Referee: Marcus Caton

29 November 2014
15:00

Old Albanian	24 – 22	Esher (BP)

Woollam Playing Fields
Attendance: 295
Referee: Gareth Holsgrove

29 November 2014
15:00

(BP) Rosslyn Park	29 – 19	Darlington Mowden Park

The Rock
Attendance: 470
Referee: Simon Harding

=== Round 14 ===
6 December 2014
14:00

Tynedale	0 – 47	Rosslyn Park (BP)

Tynedale Park
Attendance: 320
Referee: Llyr ApGeraint Roberts

6 December 2014
14:30

(BP) Esher	42 – 12	Blaydon

Molesey Road
Attendance: 811
Referee: James Clarke

6 December 2014
14:30

Hartpury College	15 – 10	Old Albanian (BP)

College Stadium
Attendance: 360
Referee: Jamie Leahy

6 December 2014
15:00

(BP) Coventry	62 – 31	Fylde (BP)

Butts Park Arena
Attendance: 1,737
Referee: Andrew Rawson

6 December 2014
15:00

(BP) Darlington Mowden Park	29 – 17	Loughborough Students

Northern Echo Arena
Attendance: 910
Referee: John Meredith

6 December 2014
15:00

(BP) Ealing Trailfinders	31 – 27	Blackheath (2BP)

Trailfinders Sports Ground
Attendance: 321
Referee: Tom Foley

6 December 2014
15:00

(BP) Macclesfield	24 – 32	Wharfedale (BP)

Priory Park
Attendance: 295
Referee: Andrew Taylorson

6 December 2014
15:00

(BP) Richmond	30 – 32	Cinderford (BP)

Athletic Ground
Attendance: 468
Referee: James Sullivan

=== Round 15 ===
13 December 2014
14:00

(BP) Blaydon	20 – 25	Hartpury College

Crow Trees
Attendance: 246
Referee: Marcus Caton

13 December 2014
14:00

(BP) Loughborough Students	32 – 3	Tynedale

Loughborough University Stadium
Attendance: 158
Referee: Jake Makepeace

13 December 2014
14:00

Wharfedale	Postponed	Esher

The Avenue

13 December 2014
14:30

(BP) Cinderford	42 – 5	Macclesfield

Dockham Park
Attendance: 234
Referee: Shane Lewis

13 December 2014
15:00

Blackheath	12 – 30	Coventry (BP)

Rectory Field
Attendance: 721
Referee: Phillip Davies

13 December 2014
15:00

(BP) Fylde	40 – 33	Richmond (2BP)

Woodlands Memorial Ground
Attendance: 476
Referee: Jamie Leahy

13 December 2014
15:00

(BP) Old Albanian	29 – 21	Darlington Mowden Park

Woollham Playing Fields
Attendance: 295
Referee: Veryaw Boscawem

13 December 2014
15:00

(BP) Rosslyn Park	16 – 17	Ealing Trailfinders

The Rock
Attendance: 2,090
Referee: Greg MacDonald

=== Round 16 ===
20 December 2014
13:30

Hartpury College	20 – 8	Cinderford

College Stadium
Attendance: 750
Referee: Andrew Rawson

20 December 2014
14:00

Tynedale	17 – 27	Blaydon (BP)

Tynedale Park
Attendance: 720
Referee: Jamie Leahy

20 December 2014
15:00

(BP) Blackheath	37 – 21	Rosslyn Park

Rectory Field
Attendance: 1,120
Referee: Gareth Holsgrove

20 December 2014
15:00

(BP) Coventry	48 – 22	Loughborough Students (BP)

Butts Park Arena
Attendance: 1,583
Referee: Marcus Caton

20 December 2014
15:00

(BP) Darlington Mowden Park	26 – 27	Wharfedale (BP)

Northern Echo Arena
Attendance: 1,320
Referee: Fergus Kirby

20 December 2014
15:00

(BP) Ealing Trailfinders	45 – 18	Old Albanian

Trailfinders Sports Ground
Attendance: 564
Referee: Rob Warburton

20 December 2014
15:00

(BP) Esher	27 – 37	Richmond (BP)

Molesey Road
Attendance: 967
Referee: Phillip Davies

20 December 2014
15:00

(BP) Fylde	57 – 5	Macclesfield

Woodlands Memorial Ground
Attendance: 834
Referee: Jack Makepeace

=== Round 17 ===
3 January 2015
14:00

Blaydon	5 – 31	Ealing Trailfinders (BP)

Crow Trees
Attendance: 345
Referee: Andrew Rawson

3 January 2015
14:00

Loughborough Students	7 – 15	Blackheath

Loughborough University Stadium
Attendance: 158
Referee: Shane Lewis

3 January 2015
14:00

(BP) Wharfedale	34 – 14	Tynedale

The Avenue
Attendance: 845
Referee: Andrew Jackson

3 January 2015
14:30

Cinderford	3 – 17	Darlington Mowden Park

Dockham Road
Attendance: 268
Referee: James Clarke

3 January 2015
15:00

(BP) Macclesfield	23 – 30	Esher (BP)

Priory Park
Attendance: 297
Referee: Jamie Leahy

3 January 2015
15:00

(BP) Old Albanian	19 – 24	Coventry

Woollam Playing Fields
Attendance: 290
Referee: Fergus Kirby

3 January 2015
15:00

(BP) Richmond	21 – 26	Hartpury College

Athletic Ground
Attendance: 442
Referee: James Sullivan

3 January 2015
15:00

Rosslyn Park	20 – 14	Fylde (BP)

The Rock
Attendance: 520
Referee: Rob Warburton

=== Round 18 ===
10 January 2015
14:00

(BP) Tynedale	5 – 10	Cinderford

Tynedale Stadium
Attendance: 400
Referee: Jamie Leahy

10 January 2015
14:30

(BP) Hartpury College	54 – 10	Macclesfield

College Stadium
Attendance: 325
Referee: Veryan Boscawen

10 January 2015
15:00

(BP) Blackheath	33 – 8	Old Albanian

Rectory Field
Attendance: 621
Referee: Tom Davis

10 January 2015
15:00

(BP) Coventry	34 – 15	Blaydon

Butts Park Arena
Attendance: 1,938
Referee: Fergus Kirby

10 January 2015
15:00

(BP) Darlington Mowden Park	43 – 12	Richmond

Northern Echo Arena
Attendance: 857
Referee: Gareth Halsgrove

10 January 2015
15:00

(BP) Ealing Trailfinders	78 – 12	Wharfedale

Trailfinders Sports Ground
Attendance: 480
Referee: Rob Warburton

10 January 2015
15:00

(BP) Fylde	48 – 17	Esher

Woodlands Memorial Ground
Attendance: 542
Referee: Llyr Apgeraint Roberts

10 January 2015
15:00

(BP) Rosslyn Park	38 – 17	Loughborough Students

The Rock
Attendance: 638
Referee: Phillip Davies

=== Round 19 ===
17 January 2015
14:00

(2BP) Blaydon	31 – 38	Blackheath (BP)

Crow Trees
Attendance: 129
Referee: Daniel Parott

17 January 2015
14:00

Loughborough Students	14 – 7	Fylde (BP)

Loughborough University Stadium
Attendance: 273
Referee: Christophe Ridley

17 January 2015
14:00

(BP) Wharfedale	13 – 17	Coventry

The Avenue
Attendance: 437
Referee: Marcus Caton

17 January 2015
14:30

Cinderfield	27 – 22	Ealing Trailfinders (2BP)

Dockham Road
Attendance: 356
Referee: Llyr Apgeraint Roberts

17 January 2015
15:00

Esher	8 – 36	Hartpury College (BP)

Molesey Road
Attendance: 412
Referee: Gareth Holsgrove

17 January 2015
15:00

(2BP) Macclesfield	29 – 33	Darlington Mowden Park (BP)

Priory Park
Attendance: 242
Referee: Jack Makepeace

17 January 2015
15:00

Old Albanian	10 – 19	Rosslyn Park

Woolham Playing Fields
Attendance: 390
Referee: James Clarke

17 January 2015
15:00

(BP) Richmond	33 – 3	Tynedale

Athletic Ground
Attendance: 379
Referee: Fergus Kirby

=== Round 20 ===
24 January 2015
14:00

(BP) Loughborough Students	30 – 20	Old Albanian

Loughborough University Stadium
Attendance: 275
Referee: Sam-Grove White

24 January 2015
14:00

Tynedale	20 – 22	Macclesfield

Tynedale Park
Attendance: 350
Referee: Veryan Boscawen

24 January 2015
14:30

(BP) Rosslyn Park	20 – 15	Blaydon (BP)

The Rock
Attendance: 963
Referee: Shane Lewis

24 January 2015
15:00

Blackheath	17 – 7	Wharfedale

Rectory Field
Attendance: 592
Referee: Fergus Kirby

24 January 2015
15:00

Darlington Mowden Park	30 – 22	Esher

Northern Echo Arena
Attendance: 920
Referee: Christophe Ridley

24 January 2015
15:00

(BP) Ealing Trailfinders	63 – 36	Richmond (BP)

Trailfinders Sports Ground
Attendance: 849
Referee: Phillip Davies

24 January 2015
15:00

Fylde	12 – 35	Hartpury College (BP)

Woodlands Memorial Park
Attendance: 457
Referee: Darren Gammage

24 January 2015
15:00

(BP) Coventry	32 – 22	Cinderford

Butts Park Arena
Attendance: 2,132
Referee: Gareth Holsgrove

=== Round 21 ===
31 January 2015
14:00

(BP) Blaydon	27 – 23	Loughborough Students (BP)

Crow Trees
Attendance: 202
Referee: James Clarke

31 January 2015
14:00

(BP) Wharfedale	12 – 17	Rosslyn Park

The Avenue
Attendance: 448
Referee: Llyr Apgeraint Roberts

31 January 2015
14:30

(BP) Cinderford	14 – 17	Blackheath

Dockham Road
Attendance: 291
Referee: Elia Rizzo

31 January 2015
14:30

(BP) Hartpury College	34 – 19	Darlington Mowden Park

College Stadium
Attendance: 365
Referee: Peter Davies

31 January 2015
15:00

(BP) Esher	58 – 20	Tynedale

Molesey Road
Attendance: 400
Referee: James Sullivan

31 January 2015
15:00

Macclesfield	P – P	Ealing Trailfinders

Priory Park

31 January 2015
15:00

Old Albanian	25 – 15	Fylde

Woollam Park
Attendance: 317
Referee: Matthew O'Grady

31 January 2015
15:00

(BP) Richmond	28 – 28	Coventry

Athletic Ground
Attendance: 572
Referee: Robert Warburton

=== Round 22 ===
7 February 2015
14:00

(BP) Loughborough Students	29 – 15	Wharfedale

Loughborough University Stadium
Attendance: 265
Referee: Marcus Caton

7 February 2015
14:00

Old Albanian	19 – 18	Blaydon (BP)

Woollam Playing Fields
Attendance: 295
Referee: Thomas Davies

7 February 2015
14:00

(BP) Tynedale	16 – 23	Hartpury College

Tynedale Park
Attendance: 350
Referee: Jack Makepeace

7 February 2015
15:00

Blackheath	24 – 24	Richmond

Rectory Field
Attendance: 832
Referee: Veryan Boscawen

7 February 2015
15:00

(BP) Coventry	35 – 15	Macclesfield

Butts Park Arena
Attendance: 1,558
Referee: Shane Lewis

7 February 2015
15:00

(BP) Ealing Trailfinders	24 – 19	Esher (BP)

Trailfinders Sport Ground
Attendance: 354
Referee: Phil Davies

7 February 2015
15:00

Fylde	10 – 33	Darlington Mowden Park (BP)

Woodlands Memorial Ground
Attendance: 632
Referee: Jamie Leahy

7 February 2015
15:00

(BP) Rosslyn Park	24 – 7	Cinderford

The Rock
Attendance: 475
Referee: Robert Warburton

=== Round 23 ===
13 February 2015
19:45

Richmond	6 – 44	Rosslyn Park (BP)

Athletic Ground
Attendance: 524
Referee: Shane Lewis

14 February 2015
14:00

(2BP) Blaydon	24 – 28	Fylde (BP)

Crow Trees
Attendance: 185
Referee: Christopher Ridley

14 February 2015
14:30

Cinderford	28 – 12	Loughborough Students

Dockham Road
Attendance: 267
Referee: Robert Warburton

14 February 2015
14:30

Hartpury College	22 – 39	Ealing Trailfinders (BP)

College Stadium
Attendance: 425
Referee: Fergus Kirby

14 February 2015
14:30

Wharfedale	22 – 17	Old Albanian (BP)

The Avenue
Attendance: 433
Referee: Gareth Holsgrove

14 February 2015
15:00

(BP) Darlington Mowden Park	27 – 18	Tynedale

Northern Echo Arena
Attendance: 1,046
Referee: Andrew Taylorson

14 February 2015
15:00

Esher	20 – 17	Coventry (BP)

Molesey Road
Attendance: 485
Referee: James Leahy

14 February 2015
15:00

Macclesfield	13 – 25	Blackheath (BP)

Priory Park
Attendance: 217
Referee: Brendan McGaffney

=== Round 24 ===
21 February 2015
14:00

(BP) Blaydon	34 – 27	Wharfedale (2BP)

Crow Trees
Attendance: 410
Referee: Jack Makepeace

21 February 2015
14:00

(BP) Loughborough Students	29 – 13	Richmond

Loughborough University Stadium
Attendance: 236
Referee: James Sullivan

21 February 2015
15:00

Blackheath	27 – 23	Esher (BP)

Rectory Field
Attendance: 917
Referee: Christopher Ridley

21 February 2015
15:00

(BP) Coventry	20 – 22	Hartpury College

Butts Park Arena
Attendance: 1,540
Referee: Rob Warburton

21 February 2015
15:00

(BP) Ealing Trailfinders	29 – 17	Darlington Mowden Park

Trailfinders Sports Ground
Attendance: 491
Referee: Gareth Holsgrove

21 February 2015
15:00

(BP) Fylde	33 – 26	Tynedale (2BP)

Woodlands Memorial Ground
Attendance: 459
Referee: Matthew O'Grady

21 February 2015
15:00

Old Albanian	20 – 7	Cinderford

Woollam Playing Fields
Attendance: 442
Referee: Marcus Caton

21 February 2015
15:00

(BP) Rosslyn Park	35 – 12	Macclesfield

The Rock
Attendance: 280
Referee: Veryan Boscawen

=== Postponed matches ===
28 February 2015
14:00

Wharfedale	8 – 6	Esher (BP)

The Avenue
Attendance: 442
Referee: Dan Parrott

28 February 2015
15:00

Macclesfield	7 – 45	Ealing Trailfinders (BP)

Priory Park
Attendance: 295
Referee: Jamie Leahy

=== Round 25 ===
7 March 2015
14:30

(BP) Cinderford	15 – 22	Blaydon

Dockham Road
Attendance: 269
Referee: Philip Davies

7 March 2015
14:30

Hartpury College	19 – 12	Blackheath (BP)

College Stadium
Attendance: 360
Referee: Llyr ApGeraint Roberts

7 March 2015
15:00

(BP) Darlington Mowden Park	32 – 25	Coventry (BP)

Northern Echo Arena
Attendance: 1,014
Referee: Jamie Leahy

7 March 2015
15:00

Esher	13 – 35	Rosslyn Park (BP)

Molesey Road
Attendance: 890
Referee: Fergus Kirby

7 March 2015
15:00

Macclesfield	22 – 35	Loughborough Students (BP)

Priory Park
Attendance: 197
Referee: Daniel Parrott

7 March 2015
15:00

(BP) Richmond	34 – 20	Old Albanian

Athletic Ground
Attendance: 447
Referee: Shane Lewis

7 March 2015
15:00

Tynedale	17 – 29	Ealing Trailfinders (BP)

Tynedale Park
Attendance: 350
Referee: Matthew O'Grady

7 March 2015
15:00

Wharfedale	24 – 24	Fylde

The Avenue
Attendance: 847
Referee: Andrew Taylorson

=== Round 26 ===
14 March 2015
14:00

(BP) Loughborough Students	36 – 20	Esher

Loughborough University Stadium
Attendance: 222
Referee: Jamie Leahy

14 March 2015
14:30

(BP) Blaydon	26 – 19	Richmond (BP)

Crow Trees
Attendance: 145
Referee: Marcus Caton

14 March 2015
15:00

(BP) Blackheath	29 – 27	Darlington Mowden Park (2BP)

Rectory Field
Attendance: 521
Referee: Fergus Kirby

14 March 2015
15:00

(BP) Coventry	64 – 12	Tynedale

Butts Park Arena
Attendance: 1,331
Referee: Gareth Holsgrove

14 March 2015
15:00

Fylde	14 – 39	Ealing Trailfinders (BP)

Woodlands Memorial Ground
Attendance: 686
Referee: Llyr ApGeraint Roberts

14 March 2015
15:00

(BP) Old Albanian	50 – 26	Macclesfield (BP)

Woollam Playing Fields
Attendance: 327
Referee: Shane Lewis

14 March 2015
15:00

(BP) Rosslyn Park	36 – 11	Hartpury College

The Rock
Attendance: 170
Referee: Philip Davies

14 March 2015
15:00

(BP) Wharfedale	32 – 21	Cinderford

The Avenue
Attendance: 612
Referee: James Sullivan

=== Round 27 ===
28 March 2015
14:30

(BP Hartpury College	20 – 19	Loughborough Students (BP)

College Stadium
Attendance: 642
Referee: Shane Lewis

28 March 2015
15:00

(BP) Cinderford	37 – 14	Fylde

Dockham Road
Attendance: 371
Referee: John Leahy

28 March 2015
15:00

Darlington Mowden Park	12 – 24	Rosslyn Park (BP)

Northern Echo Arena
Attendance: 1,495
Referee: Gareth Holsgrove

28 March 2015
15:00

(BP) Ealing Trailfinders	24 – 18	Coventry (BP)

Trailfinders Sports Ground
Attendance: 1,042
Referee: Fergus Kirby

28 March 2015
15:00

Esher	30 – 30	Old Albanian (BP)

Molesey Road
Attendance: 405
Referee: Robert Warburton

28 March 2015
15:00

(BP) Macclesfield	7 – 10	Blaydon

Priory Park
Attendance: 358
Referee: Tom Davis

28 March 2015
15:00

(BP) Richmond	34 – 19	Wharfedale

Athletic Ground
Attendance: 371
Referee: Christopher Ridley

28 March 2015
15:00

(BP) Tynedale	40 – 19	Blackheath

Tynedale Park
Attendance: 350
Referee: Jack Makepeace

=== Round 28 ===
11 April 2015
14:00

(BP Loughborough Students	21 – 28	Darlington Mowden Park (BP)

Loughborough University Stadium
Attendance: 382
Referee: Ben Blain

11 April 2015
14:30

Blaydon	7 – 17	Esher

Crow Trees
Attendance: 205
Referee: Jamie Leamy

11 April 2015
15:00

Blackheath	12 – 45	Ealing Trailfinders (BP)

Rectory Field
Attendance: 1,346
Referee: Robert Warburton

11 April 2015
15:00

(BP) Cinderford	35 – 10	Richmond

Dockham Road
Attendance: 387
Referee: Gareth Holsgrove

11 April 2015
15:00

(BP) Fylde	44 – 28	Coventry

Woodlands Memorial Ground
Attendance: 879
Referee: Matthew O'Grady

11 April 2015
15:00

(BP) Old Albanian	31 – 59	Hartpury College (BP)

Woollam Playing Fields
Attendance: 237
Referee: Marcus Caton

11 April 2015
15:00

(BP) Rosslyn Park	38 – 20	Tynedale

The Rock
Attendance: 361
Referee: James Sullivan

11 April 2015
15:00

Wharfedale	14 – 32	Macclesfield (BP)

The Avenue
Attendance: 435
Referee: Christophe Ridley

=== Round 29 ===
18 April 2015
14:30

(BP) Hartpury College	34 – 26	Blaydon (BP)

College Stadium
Attendance: 386
Referee: Dan Parrott

18 April 2015
15:00

(BP) Coventry	49 – 29	Blackheath (BP)

Butts Park Arena
Attendance: 1,949
Referee: James Sullivan

18 April 2015
15:00

Darlington Mowden Park	19 – 51	Old Albanian (BP)

Northern Echo Arena
Attendance: 1,252
Referee: Matthew O'Grady

18 April 2015
15:00

(BP) Ealing Trailfinders	15 – 19	Rosslyn Park

Trailfinders Sports Ground
Attendance: 2,278
Referee: Fergus Kirby

18 April 2015
15:00

(BP) Esher	26 – 8	Wharfedale

Molesey Road
Attendance: 573
Referee: Phillip Davies

18 April 2015
15:00

(BP) Macclesfield	31 – 44	Cinderford (BP)

Priory Park
Attendance: 386
Referee: Llyr ApGerant-Roberts

18 April 2015
15:00

(BP) Richmond	36 – 21	Fylde

Athletic Ground
Attendance: 300
Referee: Shane Lewis

18 April 2015
15:00

(BP) Tynedale	26 – 17	Loughborough Students

Tynedale Park
Attendance: 337
Referee: John Leahy

=== Round 30 ===
25 April 2015
14:00

Loughborough Students	8 – 31	Ealing Trailfinders (BP)

Loughborough University Stadium
Attendance: 350
Referee: Shane Lewis

25 April 2015
14:30

(BP) Blaydon	33 – 6	Darlington Mowden Park

Crow Trees
Attendance: 1,190
Referee: Ben Blain

25 April 2015
14:30

(BP) Cinderford	33 – 17	Esher

Dockham Road
Attendance: 810
Referee: Rob Warburton

25 April 2015
15:00

Blackheath	12 – 32	Fylde (BP)

Rectory Field
Attendance: 922
Referee: James Clarke

25 April 2015
15:00

(BP) Old Albanian	50 – 29	Tynedale

Woollam Playing Fields
Attendance: 413
Referee: Philip Davies

25 April 2015
15:00

(BP) Richmond	66 – 41	Macclesfield (BP)

Athletic Ground
Attendance: 461
Referee: Luis Caviglia

25 April 2015
15:00

(2BP) Rosslyn Park	45 – 50	Coventry (BP)

The Rock
Attendance: 910
Referee: Marcus Caton

25 April 2015
15:00

(BP) Wharfedale	29 – 3	Hartpury College

The Avenue
Attendance: 558
Referee: Jamie Leahy

== Season records ==
=== Team ===
Largest home win — 66 pts

78 – 12 Ealing Trailfinders at home to Wharfedale on 10 January

Largest away win — 47 pts

0 – 47 Fylde away to Macclesfield on 13 September

Most points scored — 78

78 – 12 Ealing Trailfinders at home to Wharfedale on 10 January

Most tries in a match — 12

78 – 12 Ealing Trailfinders at home to Wharfedale on 10 January

Most conversions in a match — 9

Ealing Trailfinders at home to Macclesfield on 18 October
Ealing Trailfinders at home to Wharfedale on 10 January
Ealing Trailfinders at home to Richmond on 24 January

Most penalties in a match — 6

Hartbury College home to Esher on 4 October
Blackheath away to Wharfedale on 11 October

Most drop goals in a match — 1

N/A - multiple teams

=== Player ===
Most points in a match — 25

Chris Davis for Richmond away to Hartbury College on 20 September
Ben Frankland for Tynedale away to Macclesfield on 11 October
Matthew Jones for Coventry away to Rosslyn Park on 25 April

Most tries in a match — 5

Chris Davis for Richmond away to Hartbury College on 20 September
Ben Frankland for Tynedale away to Macclesfield on 11 October

Most conversions in a match — 9

Matt Jarvis for Ealing Trailfinders at home to Macclesfield on 18 October
Ben Ward for Ealing Trailfinders at home to Wharfedale on 10 January

Most penalties in a match — 6

Gareth Thompson for Hartbury College home to Esher on 4 October
Alex Gallagher for Blackheath away to Wharfedale on 11 October

Most drop goals in a match — 1

N/A - multiple players

=== Attendances ===
Highest — 2,278

Ealing Trailfinders at home to Rosslyn Park on 18 April

Lowest — 128

Cinderford at home to Old Albanian on 8 November

Highest Average Attendance — 1,506

Coventry

Lowest Average Attendance — 308

Macclesfield

== Average attendances ==
Club	Home Games	Total	Average	Highest	Lowest	% Capacity
Blackheath	15	11,010	734	1,346	473	21%
Blaydon	15	5,082	339	1,190	129	17%
Cinderford	15	5,190	346	810	128	14%
Coventry	15	22,593	1,506	2,132	1,025	38%
Darlington Mowden Park	15	15,613	1,041	1,495	835	4%
Ealing Trailfinders	15	8,930	595	2,278	275	20%
Esher	15	8,396	560	967	307	19%
Fylde	15	10,017	668	879	457	9%
Hartpury College	15	5,988	399	750	180	20%
Loughborough Students	15	5,439	363	1,550	158	12%
Macclesfield	15	4,626	308	637	197	25%
Old Albanian	15	5,042	336	442	237	34%
Richmond	15	8,518	568	1,403	226	13%
Rosslyn Park	15	11,421	761	2,090	170	38%
Tynedale	15	6,081	405	720	297	20%
Wharfedale	15	8,384	559	847	366	28%

== Leading scorers ==
=== Leading points scorers ===
Rank	Player	Team	Points
1	(England) Rob Kirby	Richmond	270
2	(England) Chris Johnson	Fylde	252
3	(South Africa) Clifford Hodgson	Coventry	250
4	(Wales) Gareth Thompson	Hartpury College	243
5	(England) Phil Chesters	Ealing Trailfinders	165
6	(England) Scott Sneddon	Rosslyn Park	153
7	(England) Andrew Baggett	Blaydon	148

=== Top try scorers ===
Rank	Player	Team	Tries
1	(England) Phil Chesters	Ealing Trailfinders	33
2	(England) Arthur Ellis	Ealing Trailfinders	29
3	(England) Oliver Brennand	Fylde	25
4	(England) Hugo Ellis	Rosslyn Park	23
5	(England) Ben Frankland	Tynedale	19
6	(Italy) Warren Spragg	Fylde	17
6	(England) Spencer Sutherland	Esher	17
