= 2009–10 WRU Challenge Cup =

The 2009–10 WRU Challenge Cup, known for sponsorship reasons as the SWALEC Cup, was the 40th WRU Challenge Cup, the annual national rugby union cup competition of Wales. The previous competition was won by Neath RFC, who had previously won it six times, in 1971–72, 1988–89, 1989–90, 2003–04, 2007–08 and 2008-09.

== Calendar ==
Stage	Date
Round 1	12 December 2009
Round 2	16–18 January 2010
Round 3	20 February 2010
Quarter-finals	27 March 2010
Semi-finals	17–18 April 2010
Final	8 May 2010

== Matches ==
=== Round 1 ===
Home team	Score	Away team
Bedlinog	24 - 9	Tredegar
Bridgend	5 – 41	Tonmawr
Builth Wells	9 – 19	Newbridge
Llangennech	21 - 20	Llanharan
Narberth	15 – 11	Bridgend Athletic
Whitland	24 – 11	Ystrad Rhondda RFC

=== Round 2 ===
Home team	Score	Away team
Cardiff	7 – 3	Bedlinog
Bargoed	19 - 9	Corus Saints (Port Talbot)
Beddau	0 – 40	Aberavon
Bedwas	31 – 3	Bonymaen
Carmarthen Athletic	8 – 29	Carmarthen Quins
Cross Keys	39 – 10	Cwmllynfell
Ebbw Vale	7 – 23	Llanelli
Llandovery RFC	24 – 13	Whitland
Llangennech	7 – 34	Tonmawr
Merthyr	6 - 31	Newport
Narberth	28 – 8	Pontypool
Neath	11 - 16	Glamorgan Wanderers
Newbridge	13 – 16	Blackwood
Pontypridd	94 – 0	Felinfoel
Felinfoel	17 - 13	UWIC
Swansea	69 – 3	Caerphilly

=== Round 3 ===
Home team	Score	Away team
Aberavon	33 - 21	Cross Keys
Blackwood	22 - 23	Carmarthen Quins
Llanelli	42 - 20	Bargoed
Narberth	14 – 28	Bedwas
Newport RFC	20 – 22	Cardiff RFC
Pontypridd	17 - 8	Swansea
Glamorgan Wanderers	23 – 16	Rumney
Tonmawr	6 – 60	Llandovery

== Finals ==
=== Quarter-finals ===
Home team	Score	Away team
Bedwas	24 – 34	Cardiff
Glamorgan Wanderers	26 - 31	Carmarthen Quins
Pontypridd	41 – 16	Aberavon
Tonmawr	16 – 26	Tonmawr

=== Semi-finals ===
Team 1	Score	Team 2	Venue
Carmarthen Quins	41 – 12	Pontypridd	Brewery Field
Llanelli	46 – 25	Cardiff	St. Helens

=== Final ===
Team 1	Score	Team 2	Venue
Carmarthen Quins	8 – 20	Llanelli	Millennium Stadium

Quarter-finals
27 March 2010
Bedwas	24
Cardiff	34
27 March 2010
Glamorgan Wanderers	26
Carmarthen Quins	31
27 March 2010
Pontypridd	62
Aberavon	16
27 March 2010
Tonmawr	16
Llanelli	26

Semi-finals
17 April 2010 – Brewery Field
Carmarthen Quins	41
Pontypridd	12
18 April 2010 – St. Helens
Llanelli	46
Cardiff	25

Final
8 May 2010 – Millennium Stadium
Carmarthen Quins	8
Llanelli	20

== See also ==
- 2009–10 WRU Challenge Cup: Tier 2
- 2009–10 WRU Challenge Cup: Tier 3

Preceded by 2007–08	WRU Challenge Cup; 2008–09	Succeeded by 2009–10
