= Phil Keith-Roach =

English rugby union scrum coach

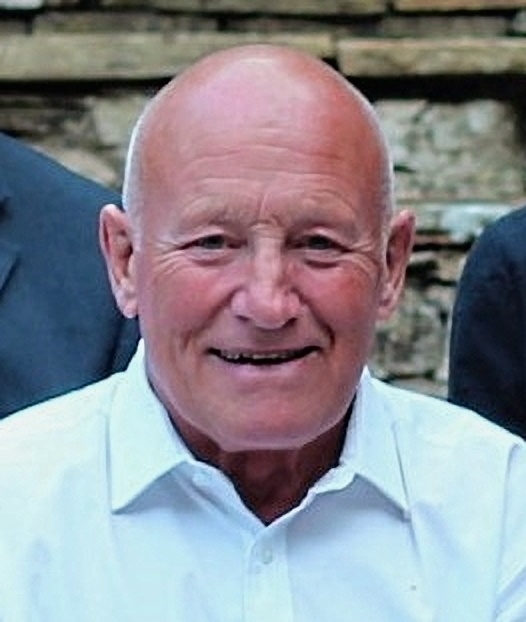
Phil Keith-Roach

Philip d'Aubigny Keith-Roach is an English rugby union coach. He was the scrum coach for the 2003 Rugby World Cup-winning England team.

He previously coached Surrey County, Rosslyn Park F.C. and London Division before being appointed as the first full-time professional scrummaging coach in the UK with Wasps RFC and later with England.

Keith-Roach was born 11 August 1943 in Jerusalem where his father, Edward Keith-Roach, was the District Commissioner. He was Educated at Cheltenham, St Luke’s College Exeter and Pembroke College, Cambridge.

== Career ==
Keith-Roach worked with three England head coaches - Jack Rowell, Clive Woodward and Andy Robinson. He was involved in 113 international matches between 1995 and 2007. He went on to coach Sale Sharks in the English Premiership, Stade Français in the French Top 14, assisted the Russia national team and acted as scrum consultant to English international referee Wayne Barnes.

He also advised Toulon (RC Toulonnais) during their European Cup campaigns, Cambridge University prior to The Varsity Match and Doncaster Knights in the Championship.

A three-time Cambridge blue as a hooker, he also played for Stroud, Gloucester, Rosslyn Park, Eastern Counties, London Division and the Barbarians during a 22-year playing career. An England trialist in 1969, he was reserve hooker for England against South Africa and on various occasions in the 1970s.

After leaving university he taught at Trinity School Croydon and later at Dulwich College. Whilst at Dulwich he was involved with the launch of Rhino Rugby the scrum machine manufacturers before switching to full time coaching when rugby union became openly professional in 1995.

Keith-Roach was present at all three England World Cup victories: the football World Cup final in 1966, the rugby World Cup final in 2003 as England scrum coach, and the cricket World Cup final in 2019.
