= Arthur Ellis (rugby union) =

Welsh rugby union player

MBA Arthur Ellis
- Born: 7 June 1990 (age 36) Aberdare, Wales
- Weight: 93 kg (205 lb)
- School: St Benedict's, Ealing
- Notable relative: Hugo Ellis (brother)

Rugby union career
- Current team: Ospreys (rugby union)
Senior career
Years	Team	Apps	(Points)
2007–10	London Wasps	13	(0)
2010–11	Dragons	0	(0)
2012-14	Ospreys (rugby union)	6	(0)
2015-	Ealing Trailfinders	47	(11)

Arthur Ellis (born 7 June 1990) is a rugby union player who plays at open-side flanker for Rosslyn Park. His father played for Wales Schools, Neath and was an Oxford Blue. Ellis attended St Benedict's School, Ealing.

Arthur Ellis played for Wales U16s before representing England at U18, 19 and 20 level. His older brother, Hugo Ellis also represented England U20. Arthur Ellis left London Wasps in June 2010 to join Newport Gwent Dragons. He was released by Newport Gwent Dragons at the end of the 2010–11 season and joined Bridgend Ravens. He has made several appearances for the Ospreys (rugby union) in the Anglo-Welsh Cup and made his first league appearance in the Pro12 against Edinburgh Rugby on 22 February 2013. Ellis also attends and plays rugby for Cardiff University.
