= 2009–10 WRU Challenge Cup: Tier 2 =

The 2009–10 WRU Challenge Cup: Tier 2, known for sponsorship reasons as the SWALEC Plate, is the 2nd WRU Challenge Cup: Tier 2, the annual national rugby union cup competition for middle division teams of Wales.

== Calendar ==
Stage	Date
Round 1	31 October 2009
Round 2	12 December 2009
Round 3	16 January 2010
Quarter-finals	20 February 2010
Semi-finals	17 April 2010
Final	8 May 2010

== Matches ==
=== Round 1 ===
Home team	Score	Away team
Abercynon	25 - 26	Heol Y Cyw
Abergavenney	31 - 20	Pontypool United
Ammanford	51 - 14	Llanelli Wanderers
Cardigan	19 - 29	Kidwelly
Grandiffaith	37 - 19	Pill Harriers
Glynneath	19 - 8	Briton Ferry
Gorseinon	15 - 32	Mumbles
Kenfig Hill	42 - 16	Brecon
Llandaff	10 - 21	Tylorstown
Llandeilo	20 - 23	Aberystwyth
Llangefni	3 - 14	Mold
Nelson	19 - 55	Rhydfelin
Penalta	32 - 24	Blaina
Pencoed	21 - 22	Tondu
Seven Sisters	3 - 8	BP (Llandarcy)

=== Round 2 ===
Home team	Score	Away team
Aberavon Quins	29 - 21	Brynamman
Aberdare	63 - 8	Rhymney
Aberystwyth	43 - 0	Llanybydder
Ammanford	27 - 7	Morriston
Bryncoch	35 - 14	Cwmavon
Brynmawr	43 - 17	Cwmbran
Caernarfon	16 - 6	Bro Ffestiniog
Crymych	15 - 6	Lampeter
Denbigh	18 - 13	Llandudno
Grandiffaith	28 - 19	Abergavenney
Glynneath	16 - 0	BP Llandarcy
Gwernyfed	34 - 0	Newport HSOB
Haverfordwest	3 - 10	Laugharne
Heol Y Cyw	8 - 15	Llandaff North
Maesteg	25 - 0	Llantrisant
Maesteg Quins	7 - 53	Treorchy
Mountain Ash	0 - 3	Llantwit Fardre
Nant Conwy	12 - 7	Mold
Newcastle Emlyn	13 - 11	Kidwelly
Penallta	14 - 7	Llanishen
Penarth	13 - 7	St. Peters
Penclawdd	22 - 26	Mumbles
Pentyrch	36 - 0	Fairwater
Pontyberem	20 - 24	Lougher
Ruthin	15 - 13	Pwllheli
Tondu	23 - 3	Nantyffyllon
Tredegar Ironsides	42 - 5	Croesyceiliog
Treherbert	3 - 39	Kenfig Hill
Tylorstown	7 - 34	Gilfach Goch
Waunarlwydd	23 - 18	Dunvant
Ynysybwl	5 - 37	Rhydfelin
Ystalyfera	5 - 36	Skewen

=== Round 3 ===
Home team	Score	Away team

=== Round 4 ===
Home team	Score	Away team
Aberystwyth	47 - 22	Laugharne
Brynmawr	27 - 15	Nant Conwy
Gwernyfed	16 - 21	Waunarlwydd
Kenfig Hill	24 - 3	Gilfach Goch
Llantwit Fardre	35 - 14	Ruthin
Lougher	26 - 11	Aberavon Quins
Maesteg	21 - 14	Skewen
Rhydfelin	13 - 9	Penarth

== Finals ==
=== Quarter-finals ===
Home team	Score	Away team
Aberystwyth	19 - 38	Lougher
Kenfig Hill	39 - 10	Brynmawr
Llantwit Fardre	23 - 17	Rhydfelin
Waunarlwydd	14 - 16	Maesteg

=== Semi-finals ===
Team 1	Score	Team 2
Kenfig Hill	19 - 12	Llantwit Fardre
Maesteg	31 - 29	Loughor

=== Final ===
Team 1	Score	Team 2
Kenfig Hill		Maesteg

Quarter-finals
March 27
Kenfig Hill	39
Brynmawr	10
March 27
Llantwit Fardre	23
Rhydfelin	17
March 27
Waunarlwydd	14
Maesteg	16
March 27
Aberystwyth	19
Loughor	38

Semi-finals
April 17
Kenfig Hill	19
Llantwit Fardre	12
April 17
Maesteg	31
Loughor	29

Final
May 8 - Millennium Stadium, Cardiff
Kenfig Hill
Maesteg
