= 2015–16 WRU Challenge Cup =

The 2015–16 WRU Challenge Cup, known for sponsorship reasons as the SSE SWALEC Cup, is the 46th WRU Challenge Cup, the annual national rugby union cup competition of Wales. The competition was won by Llandovery who beat Carmarthen Quins 25-18 in the final.

== Calendar ==
Stage	Date
Round 1	9 January 2016
Round 2	27 February 2016
Quarter-finals	20 March 2016
Semi-finals	16 April 2016
Final	1 May 2016

== Matches ==
=== Round 1 ===
Home team	Score	Away team
Glynneath	3 – 24	Newcastle Emlyn
Llandovery	9 – 6	Cardiff
RGC 1404	93 – 0	Llanharan
Swansea	11 – 18	Pontypridd
Tata Steel	7 – 15	Llanelli
Narberth	0 – 28	Merthyr
Neath	27 – 22	Bargoed
Newport	12 – 30	Carmarthen Quins
Pontypool	11 – 19	Bedwas
Beddau	13 – 20	Bridgend

=== Round 2 ===
Home team	Score	Away team
RGC 1404	11 – 8	Aberavon
Bridgend	13 – 20	Cross Keys
Pontypridd	45 – 15	Bridgend Athletic
Carmarthen Quins	23 – 11	Bedwas
Llandovery	59 – 12	Newbridge
Llanelli	14 – 17	Merthyr
Neath	34 – 16	Cardiff Met
Newcastle Emlyn	7 – 61	Ebbw Vale

=== Quarter-finals ===
Home team	Score	Away team
RGC 1404	19 – 25	Carmarthen Quins
Cross Keys	73 – 5	Neath
Pontypridd	6 – 5	Merthyr
Ebbw Vale	8 – 16	Llandovery

=== Semi-finals ===
Home team	Score	Away team
Carmarthen Quins	21 – 20	Cross Keys
Pontypridd	16 – 25	Llandovery

=== Final ===
1 May 2015
17:35 BST

Carmarthen Quins	18-25	Llandovery
Try: Penalty Try 58', Iolo Evans 79'; Con: Craig Evans (1/2) 58'; Pen: Craig Evans (2/3) 18', 21'	Report	Try: Rhodri Davies 42', Wyn Jones 60', Craig Woodall 72'; Con: Jack Maynard (2/3) 42', 60'; Pen: Jack Maynard (2/2) 8', 35'

Principality Stadium, Cardiff
Referee: Ian Davies
