= 2009–10 WRU Challenge Cup: Tier 3 =

The 2009–10 WRU Challenge Cup: Tier 3, known for sponsorship reasons as the SWALEC Bowl, is the 2nd WRU Challenge Cup: Tier 3, the annual national rugby union cup competition for lower division teams of Wales.

== Calendar ==
Stage	Date
Round 1	10 October 2009
Round 2	31 October 2009
Round 3	12 December 2009
Round 4	16 January 2010
Quarter-finals	20 February 2010
Semi-finals	17 April 2010
Final	8 May 2010

== Matches ==
=== Round 1 ===
Home team	Score	Away team
Aberaeron	18 - 23	Bethesda
Blaenavon	58 - 7	St. Josephs
Blaengarw	7 - 64	Baglan
Caerau Ely	38 - 0	St. Albans
Cefn Cribbwr	22 - 42	Bryncethin
Cefn Fforest	9 - 40	Risca
Crumlin	96 - 13	Aberbargoed
Ferndale	19 - 30	Pontyclun
Glais	18 - 38	Furnace United
Hendy	41 - 13	Trimsaran
Lampeter College	13 - 15	Pontyates
Llandybie	20 - 0	Mynydd-Y-Garreg
Machen	40 - 3	Abertyswwg Falcons
Maesteg Celtic	32 - 0	Cwmgors
Monmouth	104 - 0	Forgeside
Old Penarthians	17 - 0	Cardiff Saracens
Penybanc	12 - 21	Amman United
Pontllanfraith	12 - 26	Llanhilleth
Porth Harlequins	31 - 15	Nantymoel
Swansea Uplands	Withdrawn	Tumble
Usk	30 - 28	Hartridge
Welshpool	24 - 27	Newtown
Ynysowen	12 - 22	Dowlais

=== Round 2 ===
Home team	Score	Away team
Aberavon Naval Club	3 - 52	Pontardawe
Abercarn	74 - 3	Cwm
Abertillery/Blaenau Gwent	52 - 12	Aberbeeg
Amman United	36 - 21	Neyland
Bala	Walkover	Bangor College
Barry	23 - 18	Clwb Rygbi
Beaufort	47 - 20	Llandrindod Wells
Bethesda	Walkover	Bangor University
Birchgrove	15 - 3	Furnace United
Blaenau	19 - 15	Nantgaredig
Bryncethin	15 - 3	Baglan
Brynithel	7 - 19	Blaenavon
Caerleon	24 - 3	Llanhilleth
Cambrian Welfare	20 - 10	Dowlais
Canton	6 - 39	Taffs Well
Cefn Coed	Walkover	Deri
Cefneithin	6 - 13	Penlan
Chepstow	40 - 7	Trefil
Cilfynydd	3 - 12	Penygraig
Crickhowell	31 - 20	Llanidloes
Crynant	25 - 10	Pontrydyfen
Cwmtwrch	36 - 0	South Gower
Dolgellau	3 - 36	Monmouth
Fishgaurd	35 - 17	Tycroes
Glyncorrwg	47 - 10	Tonna
Hendy	14 - 30	Cwmgwrach
Llandybie	36 - 13	Pantyffynnon
Llansawel	Walkover	Trinity College
Llantwit Major	22 - 32	Caerau Ely
Machen	21 - 31	Hafodyrynys
Milford Haven	43 - 25	Betws
Nantyglo	10 - 13	Blackwood Stars
Neath Athletic	13 - 34	Taibach
New Dock Stars	59 - 11	Fall Bay
New Tredegar	Walkover	St. Julians
Newtown	70 - 0	Rhosllanerchrugog
Oakdale	18 - 11	Crumlin
Ogmore Vale	0 - 41	Vardre
Old Illtydians	28 - 40	Llanrumney
Old Penarthians	86 - 15	Cwmcarn United
Penygroes	19 - 3	Bynea
Pontarddulais	32 - 13	Tumble
Pontyates	16 - 21	Llangadog
Pontycymmer	13 - 20	Glyncoch
Porth Harlequins	18 - 17	Pontyclun
Porthcawl	32 - 22	Tonyrefail
Pyle	Walkover	Banwen
Resolven	14 - 17	Maesteg Celtic
Rhigos	10 - 20	Bridgend Sports Club
Risca	100 - 0	Blaina United
Rogerstone	7 - 41	Bettws
RTB Ebbw Vale	31 - 9	Hollybush
Senghenydd	43 - 7	Cardiff HSOB
South Wales Police	10 - 18	Wattstown
St. Josephs	25 - 13	Rhiwbina
Talywain	29 - 18	Usk
Tenby United	18 - 30	Pembroke
Trebanos	39 - 14	Gowerton
Tregaron	17 - 10	Caereinion Old Boys
Trinant	26 - 25	Markham
Whiteheads	17 - 16	New Panteg
Ynysddu	34 - 3	Caldicot
Ystradgynlais	22 - 24	Machynlleth

=== Round 3 ===
Home team	Score	Away team
Abertillery/Blaenau Gwent	28 - 14	Blackwood Stars
Amman United	13 - 10	Blaenau
Beaufort	13 - 17	Bethesda
Birchgrove	25 - 18	Penlan
Bryncethin	23 - 3	Maesteg Celtic
Caerau Ely	5 - 12	St. Josephs
Caerleon	16 - 20	Talywain
Cambrian Welfare	15 - 12	Penygraig
Cardiff University	35 - 6	Taffs Well
Cefn Coed	0 - 48	Bridgend Sports
Crynant	27 - 0	Pontardawe
Cwmtwrch	7 - 37	Trebanos'
Glyncoch	35 - 0	Porthcawl
Hafodyrynys	18 - 0	Trinant
Llangadog	19 - 12	Llandybie
Llanrumney	20 - 3	Barry
Machynlleth	50 - 17	Newtown
Milford Haven	Walkover	Llansawel
Monmouth	72 - 0	Crickhowell
New Dock Stars	10 - 22	Cwmgwrach
New Tredegar	40 - 24	Chepstow
Pembroke	17 - 5	Fishguard
Pontarddulais	17 - 0	Penygroes
Porth	7 - 6	Wattstown
Pyle	25 - 11	Taibach
Risca	17 - 12	Oakdale
RTB Ebbw Vale	0 - 22	Abercarn
Senghenydd	61 - 3	Old Penarthians
Tregaron	8 - 41	Bala
Vardre	17 - 18	Glyncorwwg
Whiteheads	10 - 37	Bettws
Ynysddu	6 - 13	Blaenavon

=== Round 4 ===
Home team	Score	Away team
Abercarn	17 - 0	Abertillery/Blaenau Gwent
Bala	9 - 13	Monmouth
Bethesda	34 - 13	Machynlleth
Bettws	24 - 10	New Tredegar
Birchgrove	28 - 0	Cwmgwrach
Bridgend Sports	11 - 5	Porth
Cambrian Welfare	14 - 20	Glyncoch
Hafodyrynys	5 - 20	Risca
Llangadog	32 - 28	Milford Haven
Llanrumney		Cardiff University
Pembroke	9 - 8	Amman United
Pontardawe	24 - 13	Bryncethin
Pontarddulais	12 - 48	Trebanos
Pyle	46 - 5	Glyncorrwg
Senghenydd	23 - 0	St. Josephs
Talywain	13 - 12	Blaenavon

=== Round 5 ===
Home team	Score	Away team
Bethesda	23 - 7	Bettws
Birchgrove	27 - 6	Llangadog
Bridgend Sports	18 - 14	Cardiff University
Monmouth	5 - 10	Senghenydd
Pembroke	10 - 17	Trebanos
Pontardawe	29 - 10	Glyncoch
Pyle	7 - 17	Risca
Talywain		Abercarn

== Finals ==
=== Quarter-finals ===
Home team	Score	Away team
Bethesda	6 - 33	Trebanos
Bridgend Sports	9 - 13	Abercarn
Risca	22 - 27	Pontardawe
Senghenydd	17 - 11	Birchgrove

=== Semi-finals ===
Home team	Score	Away team
Abercarn	22 - 17	Pontardawe
Senghenydd	26 - 28	Trebanos

=== Final ===
Home team	Score	Away team
Abercarn		Trebanos

Quarter-finals
March 27
Bridgend Sports	9
Abercarn	13
March 27
Risca	22
Pontardawe	27
March 27
Senghenydd	17
Birchgrove	11
March 27
Bethesda	6
Trebanos	33

Semi-finals
April 17
Abercarn	22
Pontardawe	17
April 17
Senghenydd	26
Trebanos	28

Final
May 8 - Millennium Stadium, Cardiff
Abercarn
Trebanos
