= Chris Winn =

England international rugby union player & cricketer

- Born: Christopher Elliott Winn; 13 November 1926 Beckenham, Kent, England
- Died: 27 August 2017 (aged 90) London, England
- University: Oxford

Rugby union career
- Position: Winger
International career
| Years | Team | Apps | (Points) |
| 1952–54 | England | 8 | (12) |
- Correct as of 27 August 2017

Chris Winn
Personal information
- Full name: Christopher Elliott Winn
- Born: 13 November 1926; Beckenham, Kent, England
- Died: 27 August 2017 (aged 90) (pancreatic cancer); London, England
- Batting: Left-handed
- Role: Batsman, occasional wicket-keeper

Domestic team information
- Years: Team
- 1948–1951: Oxford University
- 1948–1952: Sussex

Career statistics
| Competition | First-class |
|---|---|
| Matches | 59 |
| Runs scored | 2449 |
| Batting average | 24.98 |
| 100s/50s | 2/12 |
| Top score | 146 not out |
| Balls bowled | 36 |
| Wickets | 1 |
| Bowling average | 34.00 |
| 5 wickets in innings | – |
| 10 wickets in match | – |
| Best bowling | 1/21 |
| Catches/stumpings | 40/1 |
- Source: Cricket Archive, 27 May 2014

Christopher Elliott Winn (13 November 1926 – 27 August 2017) was an English rugby union player and cricketer. He played international rugby for England and first-class cricket for Sussex and Oxford University. He died in a nursing home from pancreatic cancer on 27 August 2017.

== Rugby ==
Winn played eight rugby union Tests for England between 1952 and 1954 as a winger, scoring three tries. He won a Blue for Oxford University and after university played for Rosslyn Park, where he was later President.

== Cricket ==
He appeared in 59 first-class matches as a left-handed batsman who sometimes kept wicket. He scored 2,449 runs with a highest score of 146 not out, one of two centuries, and completed 40 catches with one stumping.
