= 2010–11 WRU Challenge Cup: Tier 3 =

The 2010–11 WRU Challenge Cup: Tier 3, known for sponsorship reasons as the SWALEC Bowl, is the 3rd WRU Challenge Cup: Tier 3, the annual national rugby union cup competition for lower division teams of Wales. The competition was won by Senghenydd who beat Maesteg Quins 28 – 18 in the final.

== Calendar ==
Stage	Date
Round 1	9 October 2010
Round 2	30 October 2010
Round 3	11 December 2010
Round 4	29 January 2011
Round 5	19 February 2011
Quarter-finals	26 March 2011
Semi-finals	9 April 2011
Final	2 May 2011

== Matches ==
=== Round 1 ===
Home team	Score	Away team
Aberbargoed	35 – 12	Pontllanfraith
Abercarn	23 – 19	Oakdale
Abercrave	49 – 12	Penybanc
Abergele	58 – 6	Bangor
Amman United	68 – 11	Bynea
Bettws	21 – 25	Ynysddu
Blackwood Stars	57 – 8	Hollybush
Bleangarw	3 – 24	Ynysowen
Briton Ferry	25 – 30	Crynant
Cambrian Welfare	17 – 11	Hirwaun
Cardiff HSOB	12 – 27	Cardiff University
Cardigan	77 – 0	Lampeter College
Cwmgwrach	15 – 25	Maesteg Quins
Dinas Powys	0 – 58	Cardiff Academicals
Flint	24 – 31	Llandrindod Wells
Furnace	16 – 7	Hendy
Llangollen	W/O	Llangoed
Llanhilleth	12 – 11	Brynithel
Llanybydder	31 – 11	Llangadog
Maesteg Celtic	40 – 15	Ogmore Vale
Menai Bridge	8 – 34	Caereinion Old Boys
Nantgaredig	23 – 10	Mynydd y Garreg
Nelson	27 – 6	Cardiff Saracens
New Panteg	16 – 44	Usk
Old Penarthians	13 – 26	Rhiwbina
Pembroke	77 – 0	St. Clears
Penlan	63 – 0	Blaenau
Pontycymmer	32 – 22	South Wales Police
Pyle	25 – 22	Pontardawe
St. Josephs (Cardiff)	21 – 3	Barry
St. Josephs (Newport)	5 – 35	Blaenavon
Tonna	34 – 14	Pontrhydyfen
Tonyrefail	24 – 18	Glyncoch
Trebanos	35 – 5	Swansea University
Trefil	W/O	Hartridge
Tregaron	12 – 29	Fishgaurd
Trinant	16 – 3	RTB Ebbw Vale
Vardre	42 – 14	Resolven
Wrexham	24 – 21	Rhyl

=== Round 2 ===
Home team	Score	Away team
Aberaeron	45 – 6	Aberystwyth University
Aberavon Naval	0 – 52	Pyle
Abercwmboi	28 – 0	Llanrumney
Abergele	10 – 27	Dolgellau
Abertysswg	12 – 16	Nantyglo
Alltwen	W/O	Cwmtwrch
Amman United	52 – 12	Gowerton
Baglan	29 – 30	Neath Athletic
Bala	W/O	Rhos
Birchgrove	3 – 42	Vardre
Blackwood Stars	15 – 10	Trinant
Bridgend Sports	15 – 0	Treherbert
Caerau Ely	3 – 12	Pontycymmer
Caerleon	34 – 22	Caldicot
Cambrian Welfare	16 – 0	Glyncorwwg
Cardiff Academicals	47 – 5	Canton
Cefn Cribbwr	24 – 12	Glais
Cefn Fforest	6 – 17	New Tredegar
Cilfynydd	17 – 19	Cefn Coed
COBRA	65 – 0	Llandrindod Wells
Crickhowell	7 – 37	Talywain
Crumlin	32 – 10	Blaina United
Crynant	14 – 23	Bryncethin
Cwmbran	W/O	Cwm
Cwmgors	13 – 27	Porthcawl
Fall Bay	0 – 5	Burry Port
Ferndale	14 – 29	Tonyrefail
Fishguard	22 – 8	Cardigan
Forgeside	11 – 24	Blaenavon
Furnace United	27 – 15	Cefneithen
Hafodyrynys	70 – 0	Aberbeeg
Llandaff	15 – 13	St. Albans
Llanidloes	31 – 3	Machynlleth
Llanhilleth	22 – 13	Trefil
Llangollen	W/O	Harlech
Llanybydder	32 – 7	Pembroke
Machen	32 – 41	Old Illtydians
Maesteg Celtic	14 – 10	Rhigos
Maesteg Quins	34 – 0	Tonna
Markham	25 – 16	Aberbargoed
Monmouth	14 – 10	Beaufort
Nelson	47 – 13	Clwb Rygbi Caerdydd
New Dock Stars	6 – 17	Nantgaredig
Newtown	38 – 23	Denbigh
Pantyffynon	35 – 23	Penygroes
Pembroke Dock Quins	29 – 23	Milford Haven
Pontyates	11 – 22	Neyland
Pontyclun	W/O	Nantymoel
Porth	41 – 7	Penygraig
Rhiwbina	23 – 16	Llantwit Major
Senghenydd	42 – 15	Abercarn
South Gower	Walkover	Llandybie
St. Josephs (Cardiff)	15 – 25	Cardiff University
Tenby	38 – 8	Llangwm
Trebanos	20 – 10	Betws
Trimsaran	20 – 25	Penlan
Tycroes	15 – 25	St. Davids
UWIN	14 – 55	Chepstow
Welshpool	24 – 27	Shotton Steel
Whiteheads	27 – 22	Rogerstone
Wrexham	W/O	Benllech
Ynysddu	10 – 15	Usk
Ynysowen	12 – 20	Wattstown
Ystradgynlais	18 – 18	Abercrave

=== Round 3 ===
Home team	Score	Away team
Aberaeron	45 – 3	Neyland
Abercwmboi	3 – 31	Cardiff University
Amman United	27 – 7	Penlan
Blaenavon	10 – 6	Whiteheads
Burry Port	42 – 11	Pantyffynon
Cambrian Welfare	8 – 24	Porth
Cefn Coed	3 – 27	Nelson
Crumlin	14 – 51	Blackwood Stars
Furnace United	5 – 17	Ystradgynlais
Hafodyrynys	22 – 8	Nantyglo
Llangollen	0 – 64	Bala
Llanhilleth	0 – 36	Caerleon
Llanidloes	9 – 8	Dolgellau
Maesteg Harlequins	53 – 0	Cefn Cribbwr
Nantgaredig	27 – 16	Pembroke Dock Quins
Neath Athletic	20 – 10	Pyle
New Tredegar	28 – 11	Markham
Newtown	37 – 7	Wrexham
Old Illtydians	23 – 24	Cardiff Academicals
Pontycymmer	28 – 3	Bridgend Sports
Porthcawl	18 – 26	Bryncethin
Rhiwbina	3 – 0	Llandaff
Senghenydd	43 – 7	Cwmbran
Shotton Steel	10 – 11	COBRA
South Gower	3 – 21	Trebanos
St. Davids	3 – 25	Llanybydder
Talywain	27 – 10	Monmouth
Tenby United	43 – 16	Fishguard
Tonyrefail	27 – 10	Maesteg Celtic
Usk	6 – 5	Chepstow
Vardre	21 – 13	Alltwen
Wattstown	21 – 20	Pontyclun

=== Round 4 ===
Home team	Score	Away team
Aberaeron	24 – 27	Tenby
Amman United	45 – 10	Burry Port
Blackwood Stars	24 – 29	Senghenydd
Blaenavon	23 – 19	Usk
Caerleon	21 – 22	Monmouth
COBRA	7 – 6	Bala
Hafodyrynys	17 – 0	New Tredegar
Llanidloes	19 – 5	Newtown
Llanybydder	20 – 6	Nantgaredig
Maesteg Quins	33 – 10	Bryncethin
Pontycymmer	6 – 31	Porth
Trebanos	23 – 16	Ystradgynlais
Vardre	33 – 19	Neath Athletic
Wattstown	6 – 25	Tonyrefail

=== Round 5 ===
Home team	Score	Away team
Amman United	31 – 18	Tenby
Hafodyrynys	20 – 22	Cardiff Academicals
Llanidloes	0 – 28	Vardre
Maesteg Quins	39 – 18	Llanybydder
Monmouth	19 – 5	COBRA
Porth	46 – 24	Rhiwbina
Senghenydd	43 – 0	Blaenavon
Tonyrefail	14 – 7	Trebanos

== Finals ==
=== Quarter-finals ===
Home team	Score	Away team
Amman United	6 – 13	Porth
Cardiff Academicals	14 – 16	Vardre
Senghenydd	69 – 10	Monmouth
Tonyrefail	12 – 27	Maesteg Quins

=== Semi-finals ===
Team 1	Score	Team 2
Maesteg Quins	31–30	Porth
Vardre	10–34	Senghenydd

=== Final ===
Team 1	Score	Team 2
Maesteg Quins	18 – 28	Senghenydd

Quarter-finals
March 26
Tonyrefail	12
Maesteg Quins	27
March 26
Amman United	6
Porth	13
March 26
Cardiff Academicals	14
Vardre	16
March 26
Senghenydd	69
Monmouth	10

Semi-finals
April 9 – Taffs Well
Maesteg Quins	31
Porth	30
April 9 – Maesteg
Vardre	10
Senghenydd	34

Final
Millennium Stadium, Cardiff
Maesteg Quins	18
Senghenydd	28
