= 2008–09 WRU Challenge Cup =

The 2008–09 WRU Challenge Cup, known for sponsorship reasons as the SWALEC Cup, was the 39th WRU Challenge Cup, the annual national rugby union cup competition of Wales. The competition was won by Neath RFC, who had previously won it five times, in 1971–72, 1988–89, 1989–90, 2003–04 and 2007–08.

== Calendar ==
Stage	Date
Round 1	26–28 September 2008
Round 2	24–26 October 2008
Round 3	14–16 November 2008
Round 4	19–21 December 2008
Round 5	23–25 January 2009
Round 6	20–22 February 2009
Quarter-finals	27–29 March 2009
Semi-finals	19 April 2009
Final	9 May 2009

== Matches ==
=== Round 1 ===
Home team	Score	Away team

=== Round 2 ===
Home team	Score	Away team

=== Round 3 ===
Home team	Score	Away team
Abercwmboi	0 – 49	Caerphilly
Aberdare	23 – 25	Briton Ferry
Aberystwyth	0 – 10	Bedlinog
Bala	20 – 16	Cowbridge
Beddau	59 – 15	Vardre
Blackwood	Walkover	Pembroke Dock Quins
Bonymaen	40 – 7	Oakdale
Brynithel	6 – 60	Felinfoel
Builth Wells	24 – 20	Llandaff North
Caernarfon	8 – 22	Bridgend Athletic
Caldicot	13 – 31	BP Llandarcy
Cardigan	7 – 14	Llantrisant
Carmarthen Quins	60 – 3	Maesteg Quins
Crymych	22 – 3	Birchgrove
Cwmavon	6 – 24	Whitland
Cwmgors	5 – 85	Newbridge
Dunvant	12 – 10	Loughor
Gilfach Goch	13 – 6	Brynmawr
Kenfig Hill	68 – 10	Betws
Kidwelly	24 – 19	Glynneath
Llanharan	28 – 0	Merthyr
Llanishen	P – P	Bryncoch (Through as away team)
Llantwit Fardre	15 – 3	Waunarlwydd
Maesteg	23 – 0	Cwmllynfell
Maesteg Celtic	8 – 12	Fleur De Lys
Milford Haven	9 – 46	Llangennech
Narberth	45 – 12	Newport Saracens
Newport HSOB	10 – 30	Carmarthen Athletic
New Tredegar	19 – 29	Bethesda
Old Illtydians	P – P	Cwmbran (Through as away team)
Penalta	34 – 5	Penarth
Pencoed	33 – 3	Gwernyfed
Penygroes	5 – 18	Chepstow
Pontypool United	Walkover	Corus
Pontyates	16 – 25	Llandudno
Porth	5 – 53	Grandiffaith
Porthcawl	3 – 53	Tredegar
Rumnay	15 – 0	Skewen
Talywain	38 – 8	Trimsaran
Tondu	24 – 5	Nant Conwy
Tonmawr	45 – 3	Llandeilo
Treorchy	21 – 8	Nantyglo
Tumble	24 – 22	Monmouth
Tycroes	3 – 71	Bargoed
Tylorstown	18 – 27	Pill Harriers
UWIC	100 – 0	Hendy
Ynysybwl	18 – 10	ST Peters
Ynysddu	12 – 11	Pontyberem
Ystalyfera	6 – 17	Aberavon Quins
Ystradgynlais	3 – 66	Ystrad Rhondda

=== Round 4 ===
Home team	Score	Away team
Aberavon	49 – 16	Kidwelly
Bargoed	28 – 21	UWIC
Beddau	0 – 45	Llandovery
Bedwas	15 – 18	Newbridge
Bethesda	17 – 55	Cardiff
Bonymaen	5 – 13	Pontypool
Bridgend Athletic	72 – 3	Chepstow
Bridgend	37 – 6	Pencoed
Builth Wells	37 – 3	Bryncoch
Carmarthen Quins	31 – 3	BP Llandarcy
Corus	???	Fleur De Lys
Crymych	5 – 31	Cross Keys
Felinfoel	31 – 38	Caerphilly
Gilfach Goch	22 – 3	Cwmbran
Glamorgan	48 – 17	Carmarthen Athletic
Llandudno	3 – 73	Ebbw Vale
Llantrisant	13 – 27	Llanelli
Llanharan	81 – 0	Ynysddu
Llantwit Fardre	22 – 14	Aberavon Quins
Maesteg	5 – 50	Neath
Narberth	64 – 0	Kenfig Hill
Newport	40 – 21	Blackwood
Penalta	5 – 10	Llangennech
Pill Harriers	5 – 41	Tredegar
Pontypridd	64 – 5	Dunvant
Rumney	55 – 3	Tumble
Swansea	104 – 3	Bala
Talywain	6 – 8	Grandiffaith
Tondu	20 – 15	Treorchy
Tonmawr	22 – 3	Bedlinog
Whitland	25 – 13	Ystrad Rhondda
Ynysybwl	40 – 5	Briton Ferry

=== Round 5 ===
Home team	Score	Away team
Bridgend Athletic	7 – 28	Swansea
Caerphilly	59 – 19	Llangennech
Corus	19 – 58	Aberavon
Cross Keys	43 – 9	Builth Wells
Ebbw Vale	41 – 17	Ynysybwl
Grandiffaith	5 – 65	Llanelli
Gilfach Goch	3 – 44	Neath
Glamorgan	34 – 14	Newbridge
Llandovery	43 – 14	Bargoed
Llanharan	13 – 17	Tonmawr
Llantwit Fardre	26 – 18	Whitland
Narberth	15 – 53	Cardiff
Newport	44 – 7	Bridgend
Pontypridd	53 – 0	Pontypool
Rumney	12 – 7	Tredegar
Tondu	14 – 25	Carmarthen Quins

=== Round 6 ===
Home team	Score	Away team
Aberavon	74 – 0	Llantwit Fardre
Carmarthen Quins	20 – 22	Neath
Cross Keys	27 – 26	Pontypridd
Ebbw Vale	13 – 23	Swansea
Llanelli	29 – 25	Cardiff
Newport	38 – 18	Llandovery
Rumney	12 – 17	Caerphilly
Tonmawr	16 – 23	Glamorgan

== Finals ==
=== Quarter-finals ===
Home team	Score	Away team
Aberavon	20 – 10	Newport
Cross Keys	31 – 32	Neath
Llanelli	27 – 20	Glamorgan
Swansea	62 – 3	Caerphilly

=== Semi-finals ===
Team 1	Score	Team 2	Venue
Llanelli	26 – 23	Aberavon	Liberty Stadium
Swansea	16 – 32	Neath	Liberty Stadium

=== Final ===
Team 1	Score	Team 2	Venue
Llanelli	21 – 27	Neath	Millennium Stadium

Quarter-finals
28 March 2009
Llanelli	27
Glamorgan	20
27 March 2009
Aberavon	20
Newport	10
28 March 2009
Swansea	62
Caerphilly	3
28 March 2009
Cross Keys	31
Neath	32

Semi-finals
19 April 2009 – Liberty Stadium
Llanelli	26
Aberavon	23
19 April 2009 – Liberty Stadium
Swansea	16
Neath	32

Final
9 May 2009 – Millennium Stadium
Llanelli	21
Neath	27

Preceded by 2007–08	WRU Challenge Cup; 2008–09	Succeeded by 2009–10
