= 2010–11 WRU Challenge Cup: Tier 2 =

The 2010–11 WRU Challenge Cup: Tier 2, known for sponsorship reasons as the SWALEC Plate, is the 3rd WRU Challenge Cup: Tier 2, the annual national rugby union cup competition for middle division teams of Wales. The competition was won by Ammanford who beat Glynneath 35 – 13 in the final.

== Calendar ==
Stage	Date
Round 1	30 October 2010
Round 2	11 December 2010
Round 3	29 January 2011
Round 4	19 February 2011
Quarter-finals	26 March 2011
Semi-finals	9 April 2011
Final	2 May 2011

== Matches ==
=== Round 1 ===
Home team	Score	Away team
Aberavon Quins	37 – 10	Aberavon Green Stars
Abertillery BG	24 – 34	Pill Harriers
Blaina	0 – 40	Ynysybwl
BP Llandarcy	54 – 8	Brynamman
Brecon	23 – 15	Nantyffylion
Caernarfon	24 – 15	Bro Ffestiniog
Dowlais	33 – 24	Fairwater
Dunvant	26 – 25	Cwmllynfell
Fleur de Lys	11 – 19	Penallta
Garndiffaith	14 – 20	Abergavenny
Haverfordwest	10 – 20	Newcastle Emlyn
Llandeilo	19 – 21	Kidwelly
Llantwit Fadre	18 – 13	Pentyrch
Loughor	39 – 37	Mumbles
Mountain Ash	14 – 10	Abercynon
Pwllheli	17 – 0	Colwyn Bay
Tondu	'26 – 21	Builth Wells

=== Round 2 ===
Home team	Score	Away team
Abergavenny	14 – 27	Brynmawr
Ammanford	36 – 7	Pontarddulais
BP Llandarcy	15 – 14	Aberavon Quins
Brecon	29 – 5	'Taibach
Bryncoch	31 – 6	Cwmavon
Caerphilly	'13 – 28	Penallta
Croesyceiliog	3 – 29	Pontypool United
Gorseinon	27 – 10	Dunvant
Kenfig Hill	7 – 16	Heol y Cyw
Kidwelly	11 – 6	Crymych
Lampeter Town	17 – 23	Aberystwyth
Llandaff North	18 – 27	Aberdare
Llanelli Wanderers	43 – 3	Laugharne
Llantwit Fadre	39 – 19	St Peters
Mold	15 – 12	Bethesda
Mountain Ash	22 – 7	Llanishen
Nant Conwy	29 – 10	Llangefni
Penarth	14 – 12	Rhydyfelin
Penclawdd	12 – 0	Morriston
Pencoed	7 – 31	Tylorstown
Pill Harriers	22 – 5	Tredegar
Pontyberem	42 – 21	Newcastle Emlyn
Pwllheli	18 – 47	Caernarfon
Risca	12 – 11	Gwernyfed
Rhymney	20 – 5	Ynysybwl
Ruthin	11 – 6	Llandudno
Seven Sisters	14 – 30	Skewen
Taffs Well	29 – 14	Dowlais
Tredegar Ironsides	10 – 22	Newport HSOB
Tumble	24 – 40	Loughour
Ystalyfera	9 – 19	Glynneath

=== Round 3 ===
Home team	Score	Away team
Aberystwyth	17 – 12	Pontyberem
Ammanford	21 – 3	Penclawdd
BP Llandarcy	3 – 13	Glynneath
Brecon	16 – 18	Tylorstown
Kidwelly	49 – 0	Llanelli Wanderers
Llantwit Fadre	12 – 15	Mountain Ash
Loughor	12 – 15	Gorseinon
Nant Conwy	13 – 14	Caernarfon
Penarth	26 – 31	Risca
Pill Harriers	3 – 10	Newport HSOB
Pontypool United	18 – 16	Brynmawr
Rhymney	3 – 8	Penallta
Ruthin	11 – 0	Mold
Skewen	31 – 0	Bryncoch
Taffs Well	13 – 29	Aberdare
Tondu	11 – 7	Heol y Cyw

=== Round 4 ===
Home team	Score	Away team
Aberystwyth	19 – 21	Pontypool United
Ammanford	15 – 14	Kidwelly
Gorseinon	21 – 16	Penallta
Newport HSOB	17 – 27	Glynneath
Risca	32 – 28	Caernarfon
Ruthin	16 – 22	Aberdare
Tondu	15 – 0	Mountain Ash
Tylorstown	22 – 20	Skewen

== Finals ==
=== Quarter-finals ===
Home team	Score	Away team
Ammanford	87 – 20	Risca
Glynneath	31 – 13	Aberdare
Gorseinon	37 – 22	Tylorstown
Tondu	76 – 15	Pontypool United

=== Semi-finals ===
Team 1	Score	Team 2
Gorseinon	26 – 58	Ammanford
Tondu	3 – 16	Glynneath

=== Final ===
Team 1	Score	Team 2
Ammanford	35 – 13	Glynneath

Quarter-finals
March 26
Gorseinon	37
Tylorstown	22
March 26
Ammanford	87
Risca	20
March 26
Tondu	76
Pontypool Utd	15
March 26
Glynneath	31
Aberdare	13

Semi-finals
April 9 – Glynneath
Gorseinon	26
Ammanford	58
April 9 – Morriston
Tondu	3
Glynneath	16

Final
Millennium Stadium, Cardiff
Ammanford	35
Glynneath	13
