= Rosslyn Park F.C. =

English rugby union club, based in London

(England) Rosslyn Park
- Full name: Rosslyn Park Football Club
- Union: Middlesex RFU, Surrey RFU
- Founded: 1879; 147 years ago
- Location: Roehampton, Wandsworth, London, England
- Ground(s): The Rock, Priory Lane (Capacity: 2,000 (630 seats) (Note: Additional games at Richmond Park.))
- Chairman: Jim Turley
- President: Adam Tyrer
- Director of Rugby: Kieran Power
- Coach: Steve Neville
- Captain: Arthur Ellis
- League: National League 1
- 2025–26: 4th
Team kit

Official website
- rosslynpark.co.uk

Rosslyn Park Football Club is a rugby union club based in south west London currently playing in National League 1 – a tier 3 league in the English rugby union system.

== History ==
Founded in 1879 by cricketing friends in north London, at the end of their first season, Charles Hoyer Millar proposed forming a football club to keep the players together during the winter. There was already a Hampstead Football Club (from which both Wasps and Harlequins sprang), so the cricket club's name was adopted, reflecting the area of Hampstead where the cricketers first played their scratch games in the grounds of Rosslyn House. Their original rugby ground was at South End Green, Hampstead, then Gospel Oak and Acton before a lengthy tenure at Old Deer Park, Richmond until 1956, when Rosslyn Park moved to its current premises in Roehampton. After an initial blue shirt with white Maltese cross, its current red-and-white hoops were adopted in 1881. It still remains a Football Club, without the need for the word Rugby, and so is correctly Rosslyn Park FC, not RFC.

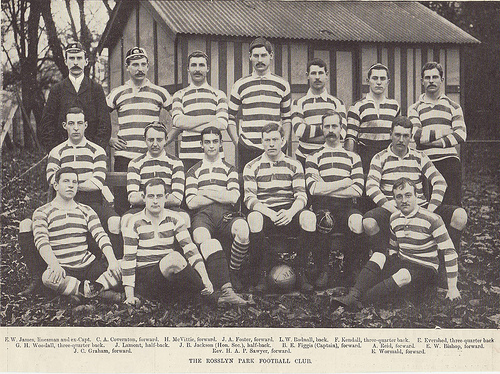
The Rosslyn Park squad in 1892

Early fixtures were generally against second XVs of leading clubs, but in the 1890s Rosslyn Park joined the first rank with fixtures against Oxford University, London Scottish, Richmond and Harlequins. Park's acceptance into the elite was signalled when venerable Blackheath agreed to play home and away fixtures in 1909. The club became the first English side to play rugby internationally when it beat Stade Français in Paris on 18 April 1892. In 1912, the club played exhibition matches in Prague, Budapest and Vienna - the first rugby matches ever played in those cities - and in 1913 played two games in Hanover, Germany. In 1939, Rosslyn Park inaugurated the annual Rosslyn Park Schools Seven Tournament, which expanded from sixteen schools to 350 in 1996. With some 7,000 players annually, it is the world's largest rugby tournament. After the Second World War, Park again led the way with a first international fixture in 1945 against traditional rivals Stade Français. In 1951, Park was the first to bring the Ladies' Cup from the Melrose Sevens south of the border. In 1975 and 1976, the club played in the final of the John Player Cup, narrowly losing on both occasions

The club runs five senior men's sides (the 1st XV, "B's", "Hatters", "Fours", and "Nomads") and a ladies side (the "Slingbacks") who play on Sundays. Rosslyn Park also have one of the country's largest mini- and youth-rugby set-ups with sides at all age groups from under-6s up. When English league rugby began in 1987, Park were placed in Division two, which they won. The first team currently play in the third division of the English league system, National League One.

The club plays at Priory Lane, Roehampton in south-west London on a ground leased from the next-door Roehampton Club. There is one 4G (4th generation synthetic turf) pitch at the main site; additional games are played on grass pitches in nearby Richmond Park. Changing facilities for both sets of pitches are at the main site in Priory Lane. The clubhouse has two bars, which are named after two of the club's famous players – Andy Ripley and Alexander Obolensky. The first floodlights for the main pitch were famously provided by the hell-raising actor Oliver Reed who was also a member of the club and occasional player. Those lights have now been replaced after storm damage.

Some 350 Park members served in the Great War, of which 109 died, believed to be the highest number from any club. The story was told in a 2012 book The Final Whistle: the Great War in Fifteen players. The original memorial was lost but was replaced with a new board in 2014 when a Centenary memorial match was played under the Laws prevailing in 1914 and the memorial was unveiled by Bill Beaumont, Chairman of the RFU.

== Ground ==
Rosslyn Park have been based at their current ground - The Rock - since 1956. In the early 1990s, when Rosslyn Park were a top flight side, the ground capacity was stated as 4,630 - 630 seated in one of the two stands, and another 4,000 standing. Although the ground has not changed much since the 1990s, stricter requirements mean the maximum capacity has been set to 2,000.

== Current standings ==
2026–27 National League 1 table
Pos	Team	Pld	W	D	L	PF	PA	PD	TB	LB	Pts	Qualification
1	Plymouth Albion	5	5	0	0	292	57	+235	5	0	25	Promotion place
2	Tonbridge Juddians	5	5	0	0	216	203	+13	5	0	25	Promotion play-off
3	Sale FC	5	4	0	1	231	141	+90	4	1	21	Promotion play-off
4	Camborne	5	4	0	1	163	144	+19	4	0	20	
5	Bishop's Stortford	5	3	0	2	184	170	+14	4	0	16	
6	Birmingham Moseley	5	3	0	2	148	191	−43	4	0	16	
7	Leeds Tykes	5	2	0	3	179	121	+58	3	3	14	
8	Rosslyn Park	5	2	0	3	178	193	−15	4	1	13	
9	Dings Crusaders	5	1	1	3	203	199	+4	5	2	13	
10	Bury St Edmunds	5	2	0	3	158	218	−60	4	0	12	
11	Rams	5	1	1	3	129	177	−48	4	1	11	Relegation play-off
12	Sheffield	5	1	0	4	98	156	−58	3	2	9	Relegation place
13	London Scottish	5	1	0	4	141	211	−70	3	1	8	Relegation place
14	Cambridge	5	0	0	5	149	288	−139	4	3	7	Relegation place

Updated to match(es) played on 5 June 2026. Source: National League Rugby
Rules for classification: If teams are level at any stage, tiebreakers are applied in the following order:
1. Number of matches won
2. Number of matches drawn
3. Difference between points for and against
4. Total number of points for
5. Aggregate number of points scored in matches between tied teams
6. Number of matches won excluding the first match, then the second and so on until the tie is settled

== Honours ==
- Middlesex Sevens winners: 1947, 1950, 1954, 1981
- Melrose Sevens winners: 1951
- John Player Cup finalists: 1974–75, 1975–76
- Middlesex Senior Cup winners: 1985
- Courage League National Division Two champions: 1987–88
- National Division Three South champions: 2002–03
- Surrey Cup winners: 2005
- National League 2 (north v south) promotion play-off winner: 2009–10

== Notable former players ==
- (England) Paul Ackford – former English international lock
- (England) Wilf Auty – Yorkshire rugby league footballer
- (England) Danny Cipriani – English international fly half
- (England) Nick Easter – English international number 8
- Neil Edwards - former Scotland international lock
- (England) Nev Edwards - Sale Sharks wing
- Hugo Ellis - England Under-20s
- Mike Friday – former England Sevens footballer
- (England) Todd Gleave - hooker
- (England) Sunni Jardine - British rugby sevens international
- Phil Keith-Roach – former English international and England Scrum coach 2003 World Cup
- (England) Alex King – former English international fly half
- (England) Joe Launchbury – English international lock
- (England) Bob Mordell – English international flanker, and rugby league footballer
- Alec Elliot Murray - Scotland international wing
- (England) Alexander Obolensky – former English international wing
- (England) Mark Odejobi – London Wasps wing
- Martin Offiah – former England and Great Britain international rugby league footballer
- (United Kingdom) John Selwyn Moll - former British Lions centre
- (England) John Ranson – former English international wing
- (England) Andy Ripley – former English international number 8
- (England) Shane Roiser – former London Wasps wing
- John Rudd – former England Saxons wing
- (England) Adam Thompstone – London Irish wing
- (England) Jim Unwin – former English and British & Irish Lions wing
- Nick Walshe – former England scrumhalf
- Lionel Edward Weston – former England scrumhalf
- (England) Chris Winn – former English international winger
- (Australia) Bruce Battishall – former Australian international flanker

== List of seasons (since the beginning of professional era) ==
Season	Division	Level	League record									Promotion play-off
Season	Division	Level	P	W	D	L	F	A	BP	Pts	Pos	Promotion play-off
1987-88	National Division 2	2	11	8	2	1	155	83	-	25	1st	
1988-89	English Premiership	1	11	5	0	6	172	208	-	10	9th	
1989-90	English Premiership	1	11	4	0	7	164	243	-	8	10th	
1990-91	English Premiership	1	12	6	0	6	216	174	-	12	7th	
1991-92	English Premiership	1	12	0	1	11	111	258	-	1	13th	
1992-93	National Division 2	2	12	5	0	7	209	199	-	10	8th	
1993-94	National Division 3	3	18	10	1	7	372	240	-	21	5th	
1994-95	National Division 3	3	18	10	0	8	313	280	-	20	4th	
1995-96	National Division 3	3	18	3	2	13	290	426	-	8	9th	
1996-97	National Division 3	3	30	17	0	13	630	620	-	34	8th	
1997-98	National League 1	3	26	13	1	12	486	537	-	27	5th	
1998-99	National League 1	3	26	17	1	8	588	371	-	35	3rd	
1999-2000	National League 1	3	26	17	2	7	694	371	-	36	4th	
2000-01	National Division 2	3	25	19	2	4	752	439	-	40	3rd	
2001-02	National Division 2	3	26	8	1	17	490	605	-	17	12th	
2002-03	National Division 3 South	4	26	24	0	2	1055	395	-	48	1st	
2003-04	National Division 2	3	26	9	1	16	672	646	-	19	12th	
2004-05	National Division 2	3	26	6	0	20	415	671	11	35	14th	
2005-06	National Division 3 South	4	26	15	0	11	549	444	11	71	6th	
2006-07	National Division 3 South	4	26	10	0	16	485	664	8	48	10th	
2007-08	National Division 3 South	4	26	12	0	14	502	463	11	59	9th	
2008-09	National Division 3 South	4	26	22	0	4	639	338	10	98	2nd	
2009-10	National Division 2 South	4	28	23	1	4	995	423	19	113	2nd	Loughborough Students 21-43 Rosslyn Park
2010-11	National League 1	3	30	13	0	17	786	847	19	71	7th	
2011-12	National League 1	3	30	17	1	12	765	657	17	88	5th	
2012-13	National League 1	3	30	19	2	9	974	638	20	100	4th	
2013-14	National League 1	3	30	25	1	4	915	413	17	119	2nd	
2014-15	National League 1	3	30	26	0	4	909	508	23	127	2nd	
2015-16	National League 1	3	30	20	0	10	745	578	15	95	5th	
2016-17	National League 1	3	30	16	1	13	867	682	20	86	6th	
2017-18	National League 1	3	29	10	2	17	752	810	22	66	12th	
2018-19	National League 1	3	30	21	1	8	873	699	20	106	3rd	
2019-20	National League 1	3	25	18	1	6	728	472	16	90	3rd	Season curtailed due to COVID-19 pandemic
2020-21	Not played due to COVID-19 pandemic											
2021-22	National League 1	3	28	19	1	8	869	556	24	102	3rd	
2022-23	National League 1	3	25	16	0	9	784	685	19	83	4th	
Total			839	483	25	331	20,921	16,643	390	2,008		

=== Number of seasons at each level ===
Level	Seasons		
Level	Seasons	1	4
2	2		
3	23		
4	6		
