= WRU Challenge Cup =

Welsh rugby union competition

Logo of the SWALEC Cup

The WRU Challenge Cup (currently known as the WRU Premiership Cup, formally called the Welsh Rugby Union Challenge Cup, is Wales' premier knockout rugby union competition and is organised by the Welsh Rugby Union. As of 2022, it has been divided into separate Cup competitions Premiership Cup, Championship Cup, Division 1 Cup etc. as well as the Bowl and Plate editions for other lower divisions. The competition is now seen as the top cup prize for the community game, separate from the Super Rygbi Cymru competitions.

On 26 February 2007, the WRU agreed a new £1 million three-year sponsorship deal with SWALEC, who had previously sponsored the event from the 1992–93 season until the 1998–99 season; the Cup was renamed the SWALEC Cup once again. The SWALEC Cup is a three-tier competition with Cup, Plate and Bowl winners. In the inaugural year, the SWALEC Plate was contested by clubs that were knocked out of the SWALEC Cup in the first two rounds, while the SWALEC Bowl was contested by clubs that were eliminated in the first round of the Plate competition. In its second year, the WRU directly split the three competitions, with teams from Divisions 4–6 competing for the Bowl, teams from Divisions 2–3 competing for the Plate, and teams from the Premiership and Division 1 competing for the Cup.

The current WRU Premiership Cup holders are Neath RFC who beat Merthyr 32–21 at the Millennium Stadium on 12 April 2026.

== Past winners ==
| Year | Winners | Score | Runners-up | Final venue |
|---|---|---|---|---|
| 1972 | Neath | 15–9 | Llanelli | Cardiff Arms Park |
| 1973 | Llanelli | 30–7 | Cardiff | Cardiff Arms Park |
| 1974 | Llanelli | 12–10 | Aberavon | Cardiff Arms Park |
| 1975 | Llanelli | 15–6 | Aberavon | Cardiff Arms Park |
| 1976 | Llanelli | 16–4 | Swansea | Cardiff Arms Park |
| 1977 | Newport | 16–15 | Cardiff | Cardiff Arms Park |
| 1978 | Swansea | 13–9 | Newport | Cardiff Arms Park |
| 1979 | Bridgend | 18–12 | Pontypridd | Cardiff Arms Park |
| 1980 | Bridgend | 15–9 | Swansea | Cardiff Arms Park |
| 1981 | Cardiff | 14–6 | Bridgend | Cardiff Arms Park |
| 1982 | Cardiff | 12–12 (Cardiff win on try count) | Bridgend | Cardiff Arms Park |
| 1983 | Pontypool | 18–6 | Swansea | Cardiff Arms Park |
| 1984 | Cardiff | 24–19 | Neath | National Stadium |
| 1985 | Llanelli | 15–14 | Cardiff | National Stadium |
| 1986 | Cardiff | 28–21 | Newport | National Stadium |
| 1987 | Cardiff | 16–15 (after extra time) | Swansea | National Stadium |
| 1988 | Llanelli | 28–13 | Neath | National Stadium |
| 1989 | Neath | 14–13 | Llanelli | National Stadium |
| 1990 | Neath | 16–10 | Bridgend | National Stadium |
| 1991 | Llanelli | 24–9 | Pontypool | National Stadium |
| 1992 | Llanelli | 16–7 | Swansea | National Stadium |
| 1993 | Llanelli | 21–18 | Neath | National Stadium |
| 1994 | Cardiff | 15–8 | Llanelli | National Stadium |
| 1995 | Swansea | 17–12 | Pontypridd | National Stadium |
| 1996 | Pontypridd | 29–22 | Neath | National Stadium |
| 1997 | Cardiff | 33–26 | Swansea | National Stadium |
| 1998 | Llanelli | 19–12 | Ebbw Vale | Ashton Gate |
| 1999 | Swansea | 37–10 | Llanelli | Ninian Park |
| 2000 | Llanelli | 22–12 | Swansea | Millennium Stadium |
| 2001 | Newport | 13–8 | Neath | Millennium Stadium |
| 2002 | Pontypridd | 20–17 | Llanelli | Millennium Stadium |
| 2003 | Llanelli | 32–9 | Newport | Millennium Stadium |
| 2004 | Neath | 36–13 | Caerphilly | Millennium Stadium |
| 2005 | Llanelli | 25–24 | Pontypridd | Millennium Stadium |
| 2006 | Pontypridd | 26–25 | Neath | Millennium Stadium |
| 2007 | Llandovery | 20–18 | Cardiff | Millennium Stadium |
| 2008 | Neath | 28–22 | Pontypridd | Millennium Stadium |
| 2009 | Neath | 27–21 | Llanelli | Millennium Stadium |
| 2010 | Llanelli | 20–8 | Carmarthen | Millennium Stadium |
| 2011 | Pontypridd | 35–24 | Aberavon | Millennium Stadium |
| 2012 | Cross Keys | 32–19 | Pontypridd | Millennium Stadium |
| 2013 | Pontypridd | 34–13 | Neath | Millennium Stadium |
| 2014 | Pontypridd | 21–8 | Cross Keys | Millennium Stadium |
| 2015 | Bridgend | 19–15 | Pontypridd | Millennium Stadium |
| 2016 | Llandovery | 25–18 | Carmarthen | Millennium Stadium |
| 2017 | RGC 1404 | 15–11 | Pontypridd | Millennium Stadium |
| 2018 | Merthyr | 41–7 | Newport | Millennium Stadium |
| 2019 | Cardiff | 25–19 | Merthyr | Millennium Stadium |
| 2020 | Cancelled due to COVID-19 pandemic | | | Millennium Stadium |
| 2021 | Cancelled due to COVID-19 pandemic | | | Millennium Stadium |
| 2022 | Newport | 25–21 | Aberavon | Millennium Stadium |
| 2023 | Cardiff | 13–10 | Newport | Millennium Stadium |
| 2024 | Llandovery | 20–18 | Merthyr | Millennium Stadium |
| 2025 | Pontypridd | 43–12 | Cross Keys | Millennium Stadium |
| 2026 | Neath | 32–21 | Merthyr | Millennium Stadium |

== Total finals by club ==
| Team | Winners | Runners-up |
|---|---|---|
| Llanelli | 14 | 6 |
| Cardiff | 9 | 4 |
| Neath | 7 | 7 |
| Pontypridd | 7 | 6 |
| Llandovery | 3 | 0 |
| Swansea | 3 | 7 |
| Bridgend | 3 | 3 |
| Newport | 3 | 4 |
| Merthyr | 1 | 3 |
| Cross Keys | 1 | 2 |
| Pontypool | 1 | 1 |
| RGC 1404 | 1 | 0 |
| Aberavon | 0 | 4 |
| Carmarthen Quins | 0 | 2 |
| Caerphilly | 0 | 1 |
| Ebbw Vale | 0 | 1 |

== Sponsorship ==
| Period | Sponsor | Name |
|---|---|---|
| 1971–1977 | —N/a | WRU Challenge Cup |
| 1977–1992 | Schweppes | Schweppes Cup |
| 1992–1999 | SWALEC | SWALEC Cup |
| 1999–2000 | —N/a | WRU Challenge Cup |
| 2000–2003 | Principality Building Society | Principality Cup |
| 2003–2008 | Konica Minolta | Konica Minolta Cup |
| 2008–2016 | SWALEC | SWALEC Cup |
| 2016–2019 | —N/a | WRU National Cup |
| 2019–2021 | Specsavers | Specsavers Cup |
| 2021–2024 | Indigo Group | Indigo Group Premiership Cup |
| 2024–present | —N/a | WRU Premiership Cup |

== See also ==
- Welsh Premier Division
- Welsh Rugby Union
- Rugby union in Wales
- Konica Minolta
