= 2018–19 National League 2 South =

Rugby union competition in England

- Countries: England; Guernsey
- Date: 1 September 2018 – 4 May 2019
- Champions: Rams (1st title)
- Runners-up: Canterbury (also promoted)
- Relegated: London Irish Wild Geese, Guernsey, Birmingham & Solihull
- Matches played: 240
- Attendance: 81,988 (average 342 per match)
- Highest attendance: 1,160; Henley v Rams; 5 January 2019
- Lowest attendance: 68; Redcliffians v Worthing; 8 December 2018
- Top point scorer: (Wales) Matthew McLean (Worthing); 341 points
- Top try scorer: (England) Henry Bird (Redcliffians); 26 tries

The 2018–19 National League 2 South is the tenth season (32nd overall) of the fourth tier (south) of the English domestic rugby union competitions since the professionalised format of the second division was introduced. At the end of the season, Rams became champions when they won away to Clifton on 6 April 2019, sealing promotion with two games to go. It was a fitting reward for the Berkshire club, who were by far the strongest side in the division. The runners up were Canterbury who claimed second spot after beating off stiff competition from the likes of Tonbridge Juddians and Henley Hawks. Despite finishing 21 points behind Rams, Canterbury's league results were still strong enough to enough to book a home promotion playoff against National League 2 North runners up, Chester. On 4 May 2019, Canterbury defeated Chester 19–10 to join Rams in the 2019–20 National League 1. For both clubs, National League 1 is the highest level they have ever reached since the leagues began back in 1987.

At the other end of the table, London Irish Wild Geese became the first team to be relegated after they suffered a heavy loss away to Henley Hawks on 30 March 2019. They were followed a week later by league newcomers Guernsey, who also went down after just one season, following a heavy defeat away to Henley on 6 April 2019. One week later still, Birmingham & Solihull became the third and final team to go down with one round still to play after they lost away to champions, Rams, on 13 April 2019, with a try bonus not enough to keep them up due to results elsewhere. London Irish Wild Geese and Guernsey will drop into London & South East Premier, while Birmingham & Solihull, who had initially been supposed to drop to Midlands Premier, decided to become an amateur club and drop out of the league system altogether.

A final point of note was Worthing's Matthew McLean, who once again finished as the league's top scorer – this time for a record-breaking 3rd time. McLean scored 341 points, including 22 tries – an outstanding total for a Worthing side that finished 9th.

== Structure ==
The league consists of sixteen teams with all the teams playing each other on a home and away basis to make a total of thirty matches each. There is one automatic promotion place, one play-off place and three relegation places. The champions are promoted to the 2019–20 National League 1 and the runners-up play the second-placed team in the 2018–19 National League 2 North with the winner being promoted. The last three teams are relegated to either London & South East Premier or South West Premier depending on the geographical location of the team (in some cases teams may join the Midlands regional leagues).

The results of the matches contribute points to the league as follows:

- 4 points are awarded for a win
- 2 points are awarded for a draw
- 0 points are awarded for a loss, however
- 1 losing (bonus) point is awarded to a team that loses a match by 7 points or fewer
- 1 additional (bonus) point is awarded to a team scoring 4 tries or more in a match.

== Participating teams and locations ==
Eleven of the teams listed below participated in the 2017–18 National League 2 South season. The 2017–18 champions Cinderford and play-off winners Chinnor, who won the promotion play-off against Sedgley Park, were promoted into the 2018–19 National League 1, while Old Albanian were relegated into the division from the 2017–18 National League 1. Sides relegated from the 2017–18 National League 2 South included Broadstreet (to Midlands Premier), Wimbledon (London & South East Premier) and Barnstaple (South West Premier).

The promoted teams are Dings Crusaders who finished as champions of South West Premier while Barnes (champions) and Guernsey (play-off) came up from London & South East Premier. Birmingham & Solihull were also included from the division when they were level transferred from National League 2 North having been promoted as champions of Midlands Premier. They were transferred to address an imbalance of teams in National League 2 caused by both Cinderford and Chinnor being promoted, with only Old Albanian dropping down to the south, and as the most southerly club in the northern division, Birmingham & Solihull were deemed the most suitable for a level transfer.

Locations of the 2018–19 National League 2 South teams

Team	Stadium	Capacity	City/Area	Previous season
Barnes	Barn Elms	500	Barnes, London	Promoted from London & SE Premier (champions)
Birmingham & Solihull	Portway		Birmingham, West Midlands	Promoted from Midlands Premier (champions) (Note: Birmingham & Solihull were level transferred into National League 2 South from National League 2 North due to an imbalance of teams.)
Bury St Edmunds	The Haberden	3,000 (135 seats)	Bury St Edmunds, Suffolk	8th
Canterbury	The Marine Travel Ground	1,500 (75 seats)	Canterbury, Kent	10th
Clifton	Station Road	2,200 (200 seats)	Cribbs Causeway, Patchway, Bristol	11th
Dings Crusaders	Shaftsbury Park	2,250 (250 seats)	Frenchay, Bristol	Promoted from South West Premier (champions)
Guernsey	Footes Lane	5,000 (720 seats)	Saint Peter Port, Guernsey	Promoted from London & SE Premier (playoff)
Henley Hawks	Dry Leas	4,000	Henley-on-Thames, Oxfordshire	9th
London Irish Wild Geese	Hazelwood	2,000	Sunbury-on-Thames, Surrey	13th
Old Albanian	Woollam Playing Fields	1,000	St Albans, Hertfordshire	Relegated from National 1 (15th)
Old Redcliffians	Scotland Lane	1,000	Brislington, Bristol	12th
Rams	Old Bath Road	1,250	Sonning, Reading, Berkshire	3rd
Redruth	The Recreation Ground	3,500 (580 seats)	Redruth, Cornwall	5th
Taunton Titans	Commsplus Stadium	2,000 (198 seats)	Taunton, Somerset	4th
Tonbridge Juddians	The Slade	1,500	Tonbridge, Kent	6th
Worthing Raiders	Roundstone Lane	1,500 (100 seats)	Angmering, West Sussex	7th

== League table ==
2018–19 National League 2 South table
Pos	Team	Pld	W	D	L	PF	PA	PD	TB	LB	Pts	Qualification
1	Rams (C)	30	28	0	2	1106	465	+641	26	1	139	Promotion place
2	Canterbury (P)	30	24	0	6	894	564	+330	21	4	121	Play-off place
3	Tonbridge Juddians	30	25	1	4	903	562	+341	17	1	120	
4	Henley Hawks	30	24	0	6	901	592	+309	20	4	120	
5	Taunton Titans	30	19	0	11	928	764	+164	19	5	100	
6	Clifton	30	12	1	17	705	862	−157	13	7	70	
7	Redruth	30	13	1	16	664	765	−101	10	5	69	
8	Bury St Edmunds	30	11	2	17	722	712	+10	13	7	68	
9	Worthing Raiders	30	11	2	17	828	908	−80	15	5	68	
10	Old Albanian	30	12	1	17	763	726	+37	10	6	66	
11	Barnes	30	12	1	17	650	712	−62	7	9	66	
12	Old Redcliffians	30	10	0	20	709	845	−136	12	8	60	
13	Dings Crusaders	30	10	0	20	575	669	−94	7	9	56	
14	Birmingham & Solihull (R)	30	10	1	19	651	818	−167	8	5	50 (Note: Birmingham & Solihull were deducted 5 points as a result of fielding an ineligible player from the previous season in Midlands Premier which carried over into the 2018-19 season.)	Relegation place
15	Guernsey (R)	30	8	0	22	581	1021	−440	11	6	49	Relegation place
16	London Irish Wild Geese (R)	30	6	0	24	494	1089	−595	7	2	33	Relegation place

Updated to match(es) played on 27 April 2019. Source: "National League 2 South". NCA Rugby.
Rules for classification: If teams are level at any stage, tiebreakers are applied in the following order:
1. Number of matches won
2. Difference between points for and against
3. Total number of points for
4. Aggregate number of points scored in matches between tied teams
5. Number of matches won excluding the first match, then the second and so on until the tie is settled
  Notes:

== Fixture & Results ==
=== Round 1 ===
1 September 2018
14:30

(1 BP) Old Albanian	59 – 5	Guernsey
	Report

Woollam Playing Fields
Attendance: 420
Referee: Richard Haughton

1 September 2018
14:30

(1 BP) Rams	44 – 15	Canterbury
	Report

Old Bath Road
Attendance: 308
Referee: Joe James

1 September 2018
15:00

(1 BP) Barnes	33 – 14	London Irish Wild Geese
	Report

Barn Elms
Attendance: 250
Referee: Jack Sutton

1 September 2018
15:00

(1 BP) Bury St Edmunds	37 – 45	Henley Hawks (1 BP)
	Report

The Haberden
Attendance: 449
Referee: Daniel Collins

1 September 2018
15:00

Dings Crusaders	17 – 25	Redruth
	Report

Shaftesbury Park
Attendance: 456
Referee: Benjamin Russell

1 September 2018
15:00

(1 BP) Old Redcliffians	14 – 17	Clifton
	Report

Scotland Lane
Attendance: 237
Referee: Andrew Wigley

1 September 2018
15:00

(1 BP) Taunton Titans	62 – 24	Worthing Raiders (1 BP)
	Report

Commsplus Stadium
Attendance: 275
Referee: Philip Davies

1 September 2018
15:00

Tonbridge Juddians	22 – 19	Birmingham & Solihull (1 BP)
	Report

The Slade
Attendance: 172
Referee: Alexis Manley

=== Round 2 ===
8 September 2018
14:00

(1 BP) Guernsey	26 – 35	Worthing Raiders (1 BP)
	Report

Footes Lane
Attendance: 851 (Note: The Rugby Paper gives an attendance of 851 while Rugby Statbunker gives a figure of 850. As the Rugby Statbunker figure seems rounded down, the Rugby Paper stat will be used instead.)
Referee: Joe James

8 September 2018
14:30

(1 BP) Birmingham & Solihull	42 – 38	Old Redcliffians (2 BP)
	Report

Portway
Attendance: 187 (Note: The Rugby Paper gives an attendance of 187 while Rugby Statbunker gives a figure of 200. As the Rugby Statbunker figure seems rounded down, the Rugby Paper stat will be used instead.)
Referee: Owen Taylor

8 September 2018
14:30

(1 BP) Clifton	11 – 17	Dings Crusaders
	Report

Station Road
Attendance: 217
Referee: Louis Biggs

8 September 2018
15:00

(1 BP) Canterbury	29 – 20	Tonbridge Juddians
	Report

The Marine Travel Ground
Attendance: 254
Referee: Daniel Collins

8 September 2018
15:00

(1 BP) Henley Hawks	26 – 24	Barnes (1 BP)
	Report

Dry Leas
Attendance: 265
Referee: Ben Russell

8 September 2018
15:00

London Irish Wild Geese	10 – 41	Rams (1 BP)
	Report

Hazelwood
Attendance: 181 (Note: The Rugby Paper gives an attendance of 181 while Rugby Statbunker gives a figure of 200. As the Rugby Statbunker figure seems rounded up, the Rugby Paper stat will be used instead.)
Referee: Steven Compton

8 September 2018
15:00

Old Albanian	27 – 39	Bury St Edmunds (1 BP)
	Report

Woollam Playing Fields
Attendance: 290
Referee: Benjamin Wilde

8 September 2018
15:00

(1 BP) Redruth	29 – 27	Taunton Titans (2 BP)
	Report

Recreation Ground
Attendance: 810
Referee: Charlie Gayther

=== Round 3 ===
14 September 2018
19:45

(1 BP) Taunton Titans	36 – 13	Clifton
	Report

Commsplus Stadium
Attendance: 525
Referee: James Milliner-Woodcock

15 September 2018
13:30

(1 BP) Bury St Edmunds	70 – 26	Guernsey (1 BP)
	Report

The Haberden
Attendance: 343
Referee: Andrew MacNeaney

15 September 2018
14:00

(1 BP) Worthing Raiders	68 – 21	Redruth
	Report

Roundstone Lane
Attendance: 537
Referee: Richard Haughton

15 September 2018
14:30

(1 BP) Rams	43 – 13	Henley Hawks
	Report

Old Bath Road
Attendance: 653
Referee: James Clarke

15 September 2018
15:00

(1 BP) Barnes	24 – 33	Old Albanian (1 BP)
	Report

Barn Elms
Attendance: 150
Referee: Alexis Manley

15 September 2018
15:00

Dings Crusaders	15 – 10	Birmingham & Solihull (1 BP)
	Report

Shaftesbury Park
Attendance: 450
Referee: Adam Wookey

15 September 2018
15:00

Old Redcliffians	21 – 43	Canterbury (1 BP)
	Report

Scotland Lane
Attendance: 158
Referee: Gareth Holsgrove

15 September 2018
15:00

(1 BP) Tonbridge Juddians	47 – 19	London Irish Wild Geese
	Report

The Slade
Attendance: 150
Referee: Philip Davies

=== Round 4 ===
22 September 2018
14:30

Birmingham & Solihull	20 – 28	Taunton Titans
	Report

Portway
Attendance: 253 (Note: The Rugby Paper gives an attendance of 253 while Rugby Statbunker gives a figure of 200. As the Rugby Paper figure seems more precise, this figure will be used instead.)
Referee: James O'Brien

22 September 2018
15:00

(1 BP) Clifton	37 – 15	Worthing Raiders
	Report

Station Road
Attendance: 174
Referee: Ben Russell

22 September 2018
15:00

Bury St Edmunds	22 – 12	Barnes
	Report

The Haberden
Attendance: 323
Referee: Robbie Bourke

22 September 2018
15:00

(1 BP) Canterbury	40 – 18	Dings Crusaders
	Report

The Marine Travel Ground
Attendance: 183
Referee: Jack Sutton

22 September 2018
15:00

(1 BP) Henley Hawks	14 – 19	Tonbridge Juddians
	Report

Dry Leas
Attendance: 465
Referee: Andrew Wigley

22 September 2018
15:00

London Irish Wild Geese	15 – 35	Old Redcliffians (1 BP)
	Report

Hazelwood
Attendance: 159 (Note: The Rugby Paper gives an attendance of 150 while Rugby Statbunker gives a figure of 159. As the Rugby Paper figure seems rounded down, the Rugby Statbunker stat will be used instead.)
Referee: Adam Wookey

22 September 2018
15:00

Old Albanian	18 – 10	Rams
	Report

Woollam Playing Fields
Attendance: 208
Referee: Tim Allatt

22 September 2018
18:00

(1 BP) Guernsey	15 – 16	Redruth
	Report

Footes Lane
Attendance: 367
Referee: Luke Davies

=== Round 5 ===
29 September 2018
14:30

(1 BP) Barnes	21 – 26	Guernsey (1 BP)
	Report

Barn Elms
Attendance: 175
Referee: Benjamin Wilde

29 September 2018
14:30

(1 BP) Rams	47 – 21	Bury St Edmunds
	Report

Old Bath Road
Attendance: 303
Referee: Richard Haughton

29 September 2018
15:00

(1 BP) Dings Crusaders	52 – 8	London Irish Wild Geese
	Report

Shaftsbury Park
Attendance: 249
Referee: Joe James

29 September 2018
15:00

Old Redcliffians	15 – 31	Henley Hawks (1 BP)
	Report

Scotland Lane
Attendance: 287
Referee: James Milliner-Woodcock

29 September 2018
15:00

(1 BP) Redruth	50 – 36	Clifton (1 BP)
	Report

Recreation Ground
Attendance: 645
Referee: Andrew Wigley

29 September 2018
15:00

Taunton Titans	23 – 22	Canterbury (2 BP)
	Report

Commsplus Stadium
Attendance: 375
Referee: Benjamin Russell

29 September 2018
15:00

Tonbridge Juddians	27 – 22	Old Albanian (1 BP)
	Report

The Slade
Attendance: 134
Referee: Robert Bourke

29 September 2018
15:00

(1 BP) Worthing Raiders	51 – 37	Birmingham & Solihull (1 BP)
	Report

Roundstone Lane
Attendance: 485
Referee: Calum Howard

=== Round 6 ===
6 October 2018
14:30

(1 BP) Birmingham & Solihull	22 – 25	Redruth
	Report

Portway
Attendance: 157 (Note: The Rugby Paper gives an attendance of 157 while Rugby Statbunker gives a figure of 150. As the Rugby Paper figure seems more precise, this figure will be used instead.)
Referee: Ben Rayner

6 October 2018
15:00

(1 BP) Barnes	19 – 26	Rams (1 BP)
	Report

Barn Elms
Attendance: 75 (Note: The Rugby Paper gives an attendance of 75 while Rugby Statbunker gives a figure of 100. As the Rugby Paper figure seems more precise, this figure will be used instead.)
Referee: Philip Davies

6 October 2018
15:00

Bury St Edmunds	0 – 10	Tonbridge Juddians
	Report

The Haberden
Attendance: 241
Referee: George Richardson

6 October 2018
15:00

Canterbury	21 – 10	Worthing Raiders
	Report

The Marine Travel Ground
Attendance: 427
Referee: Louis Biggs

6 October 2018
15:00

Henley Hawks	20 – 15	Dings Crusaders (1 BP)
	Report

Dry Leas
Attendance: 205
Referee: Nikki O'Donnell

6 October 2018
15:00

(1 BP) London Irish Wild Geese	36 – 46	Taunton Titans (1 BP)
	Report

Hazelwood
Attendance: 119
Referee: Jack Sutton

6 October 2018
15:00

Old Albanian	19 – 10	Old Redcliffians
	Report

Woollam Playing Fields
Attendance: 180
Referee: Benjamin Russell

6 October 2018
18:00

(1 BP) Guernsey	28 – 3	Clifton
	Report

Footes Lane
Attendance: 433
Referee: Andrew MacNeaney

=== Round 7 ===
13 October 2018
14:30

(1 BP) Clifton	31 – 22	Birmingham & Solihull
	Report

Station Road
Attendance: 98
Referee: Iain Kiy

13 October 2018
14:30

(1 BP) Rams	48 – 14	Guernsey
	Report

Old Bath Road
Attendance: 352
Referee: James Milliner-Woodcock

13 October 2018
15:00

Dings Crusaders	18 – 17	Old Albanian (1 BP)
	Report

Shaftesbury Park
Attendance: 402
Referee: Alexis Manley

13 October 2018
15:00

(2 BP) Old Redcliffians	31 – 35	Bury St Edmunds (1 BP)
	Report

Scotland Lane
Attendance: 314
Referee: Adam Wookey

13 October 2018
15:00

Redruth	14 – 10	Canterbury (1 BP)
	Report

Recreation Ground
Attendance: 485
Referee: Benjamin Russell

13 October 2018
15:00

(1 BP) Taunton Titans	13 – 17	Henley Hawks
	Report

Commsplus Stadium
Attendance: 450
Referee: Philip Davies

13 October 2018
15:00

(1 BP) Tonbridge Juddians	20 – 21	Barnes
	Report

The Slade
Attendance: 182
Referee: Jonathan Cook

13 October 2018
15:00

(1 BP) Worthing Raiders	41 – 14	London Irish Wild Geese
	Report

Roundstone Lane
Attendance: 505
Referee: Benjamin Wilde

=== Round 8 ===
20 October 2018
14:30

(1 BP) Rams	33 – 18	Tonbridge Juddians
	Report

Old Bath Road
Attendance: 424
Referee: Andrew Wigley

20 October 2018
15:00

Barnes	17 – 10	Old Redcliffians (1 BP)
	Report

Barn Elms
Attendance: 153
Referee: Robbie Bourke

20 October 2018
15:00

Bury St Edmunds	7 – 17	Dings Crusaders
	Report

The Haberden
Attendance: 491
Referee: Ieuan Davies

20 October 2018
15:00

(1 BP) Canterbury	40 – 34	Clifton (2 BP)
	Report

The Marine Travel Ground
Attendance: 231
Referee: Alexis Manley

20 October 2018
15:00

(1 BP) Henley Hawks	31 – 22	Worthing Raiders
	Report

Dry Leas
Attendance: 385
Referee: Joe James

20 October 2018
15:00

Old Albanian	21 – 35	Taunton Titans (1 BP)
	Report

Woollam Playing Fields
Attendance: 287 (Note: The Rugby Paper gives an attendance of 287 while Rugby Statbunker gives a figure of 230. As the Rugby Paper figure seems more precise, this figure will be used instead.)
Referee: Ian Kiy

20 October 2018
17:00

(1 BP) London Irish Wild Geese	33 – 28	Redruth (2 BP)
	Report

Hazelwood
Attendance: 144
Referee: Adam Wookey

20 October 2018
19:30

Guernsey	19 – 28	Birmingham & Solihull
	Report

Footes Lane
Attendance: 650
Referee: Jonathan Cook

=== Round 9 ===
27 October 2018
14:30

Birmingham & Solihull	17 – 31	Canterbury (1 BP)
	Report

Portway
Attendance: 121 (Note: The Rugby Paper gives an attendance of 121 while Rugby Statbunker gives a figure of 150. As the Rugby Paper figure seems more precise, this will be used instead.)
Referee: Jamie Leahy

27 October 2018
14:30

Clifton	12 – 22	London Irish Wild Geese
	Report

Station Road
Attendance: 102
Referee: Nikki O'Donnell

27 October 2018
14:30

(1 BP) Tonbridge Juddians	26 – 20	Guernsey (1 BP)
	Report

The Slade
Attendance: 163 (Note: The Rugby Paper gives an attendance of 200 while Rugby Statbunker gives a figure of 163. As the Rugby Statbunker figure seems more precise, this will be used instead.)
Referee: Calum Howard

27 October 2018
15:00

(1 BP) Dings Crusaders	5 – 10	Barnes
	Report

Shaftesbury Park
Attendance: 321
Referee: Benjamin Russell

27 October 2018
15:00

Old Redcliffians	21 – 38	Rams (1 BP)
	Report

Scotland Lane
Attendance: 103
Referee: Jack Sutton

27 October 2018
15:00

(1 BP) Redruth	16 – 22	Henley Hawks
	Report

Recreation Ground
Attendance: 780
Referee: James Milliner-Woodcock

27 October 2018
15:00

(1 BP) Taunton Titans	50 – 0	Bury St Edmunds
	Report

Commsplus Stadium
Attendance: 375 (Note: The Rugby Paper gives an attendance of 620 while Rugby Statbunker gives a figure of 375. On consultation with a Taunton official, it turns out the Rugby Statbunker figure was accurate.)
Referee: George Richardson

27 October 2018
15:00

(1 BP) Worthing Raiders	16 – 21	Old Albanian
	Report

Roundstone Lane
Attendance: 455
Referee: Henry Lowis

=== Round 10 ===
3 November 2018
14:00

(1 BP) Guernsey	13 – 15	Canterbury
	Report

Footes Lane
Attendance: 555
Referee: Daniel Collins

3 November 2018
14:00

(1 BP) Rams	33 – 15	Dings Crusaders
	Report

Old Bath Road
Attendance: 378
Referee: Louis Biggs

3 November 2018
14:30

(1 BP) Barnes	51 – 38	Taunton Titans (1 BP)
	Report

Barn Elms
Attendance: 120
Referee: Andrew Wigley

3 November 2018
14:30

Tonbridge Juddians	29 – 27	Old Redcliffians (2 BP)
	Report

The Slade
Attendance: 133
Referee: Ben Wilde

3 November 2018
15:00

(1 BP) Bury St Edmunds	22 – 36	Worthing Raiders (1 BP)
	Report

The Haberden
Attendance: 303
Referee: Jack Sutton

3 November 2018
15:00

(1 BP) Henley Hawks	47 – 12	Clifton
	Report

Dry Leas
Attendance: 265
Referee: Benjamin Russell

3 November 2018
15:00

(1 BP) London Irish Wild Geese	12 – 19	Birmingham & Solihull
	Report

Hazelwood
Attendance: 161
Referee: Alan Chandrachud

3 November 2018
15:00

(1 BP) Old Albanian	27 – 10	Redruth
	Report

Woollam Playing Fields
Attendance: 180
Referee: George Richardson

=== Round 11 ===
17 November 2018
14:00

(1 BP) Old Redcliffians	51 – 17	Guernsey
	Report

Scotland Lane
Attendance: 103
Referee: Iain Kiy

17 November 2018
14:00

Redruth	20 – 20	Bury St Edmunds
	Report

Recreation Ground
Attendance: 510
Referee: Andrew Wigley

17 November 2018
14:00

(1 BP) Worthing Raiders	31 – 39	Barnes (1 BP)
	Report

Roundstone Lane
Attendance: 521
Referee: Samuel Phillips

17 November 2018
14:30

Birmingham & Solihull	15 – 24	Henley Hawks (1 BP)
	Report

Portway
Attendance: 246
Referee: Alan Chandrachud

17 November 2018
14:30

(2 BP) Clifton	24 – 31	Old Albanian (1 BP)
	Report

Station Road
Attendance: 119
Referee: Adam Wookey

17 November 2018
15:00

(1 BP) Canterbury	31 – 12	London Irish Wild Geese
	Report

The Marine Travel Ground
Attendance: 278
Referee: Benjamin Wilde

17 November 2018
15:00

(2 BP) Dings Crusaders	27 – 34	Tonbridge Juddians (1 BP)
	Report

Shaftesbury Park
Attendance: 338
Referee: Owen Taylor

17 November 2018
15:00

(2 BP) Taunton Titans	30 – 35	Rams (1 BP)
	Report

Commsplus Stadium
Attendance: 525
Referee: James Clarke

=== Round 12 ===
24 November 2018
14:00

(1 BP) Barnes	12 – 14	Redruth
	Report

Barn Elms
Attendance: 96
Referee: Phillip Davies

24 November 2018
14:00

(1 BP) Guernsey	17 – 20	London Irish Wild Geese (1 BP)
	Report

Footes Lane
Attendance: 438
Referee: Jack Sutton

24 November 2018
14:00

(1 BP) Rams	41 – 12	Worthing Raiders
	Report

Old Bath Road
Attendance: 345
Referee: Alan Chandrachud

24 November 2018
14:30

Old Redcliffians	13 – 32	Dings Crusaders (1 BP)
	Report

Scotland Lane
Attendance: 328
Referee: James Milliner-Woodcock

24 November 2018
14:30

(1 BP) Tonbridge Juddians	46 – 17	Taunton Titans
	Report

The Slade
Attendance: 154
Referee: Ben Wilde

24 November 2018
15:00

(1 BP) Bury St Edmunds	13 – 17	Clifton
	Report

The Haberden
Attendance: 373
Referee: Henry Lowis

24 November 2018
15:00

(2 BP) Henley Hawks	29 – 32	Canterbury (1 BP)
	Report

Dry Leas
Attendance: 295
Referee: Adam Wookey

24 November 2018
15:00

(1 BP) Old Albanian	32 – 15	Birmingham & Solihull
	Report

Woollam Playing Fields
Attendance: 200
Referee: Robert Bourke

=== Round 13 ===
1 December 2018
14:00

Redruth	14 – 32	Rams (1 BP)
	Report

Recreation Ground
Attendance: 645
Referee: Ben Russell

1 December 2018
14:00

Worthing Raiders	18 – 18	Tonbridge Juddians
	Report

Roundstone Lane
Attendance: 352
Referee: Iain Kiy

1 December 2018
14:30

Birmingham & Solihull	17 – 33	Bury St Edmunds (1 BP)
	Report

Portway
Attendance: 215
Referee: Timothy Allatt

1 December 2018
14:30

(1 BP) Clifton	44 – 24	Barnes
	Report

Station Road
Attendance: 102
Referee: Andrew Smith

1 December 2018
15:00

(1 BP) Canterbury	24 – 12	Old Albanian
	Report

The Marine Travel Ground
Attendance: 287
Referee: Luke Davies

1 December 2018
15:00

(1 BP) Dings Crusaders	38 – 12	Guernsey
	Report

Shaftsbury Park
Attendance: 476
Referee: Philip Davies

1 December 2018
15:00

London Irish Wild Geese	15 – 38	Henley Hawks (1 BP)
	Report

Hazelwood
Attendance: 269
Referee: Louis Biggs

1 December 2018
15:00

(1 BP) Taunton Titans	49 – 17	Old Redcliffians
	Report

Commsplus Stadium
Attendance: 322
Referee: Andrew MacNeaney

=== Round 14 ===
8 December 2018
14:00

(1 BP) Barnes	10 – 15	Birmingham & Solihull
	Report

Barn Elms
Attendance: 203
Referee: Jack Sutton

8 December 2018
14:00

(1 BP) Old Redcliffians	33 – 22	Worthing Raiders
	Report

Scotland Lane
Attendance: 68
Referee: Adam Wookey

8 December 2018
14:00

(1 BP) Rams	26 – 19	Clifton (1 BP)
	Report

Old Bath Road
Attendance: 425
Referee: Luke Davies

8 December 2018
14:00

Tonbridge Juddians	22 – 7	Redruth
	Report

The Slade
Attendance: 172
Referee: Veryan Boscawen

8 December 2018
15:00

(1 BP) Bury St Edmunds	14 – 20	Canterbury
	Report

The Haberden
Attendance: 403
Referee: Nikki O'Donnell

8 December 2018
15:00

Dings Crusaders	10 – 33	Taunton Titans (1 BP)
	Report

Shaftsbury Park
Attendance: 318 (Note: The Rugby Paper gives an attendance of 318 while Rugby Statbunker gives a figure of 200. As Taunton are relatively near and fairly well supported and 200 is lower than Ding's average attendance, the higher figure will be used until more is revealed.)
Referee: Iain Kiy

8 December 2018
15:00

(1 BP) Old Albanian	56 – 0	London Irish Wild Geese
	Report

Woollam Playing Fields
Attendance: 231
Referee: Andrew Smith

8 December 2018
15:30

(1 BP) Guernsey	10 – 17	Henley Hawks
	Report

Footes Lane
Attendance: 408
Referee: Calum Howard

=== Round 15 ===
15 December 2018
14:00

Redruth	17 – 27	Old Redcliffians
	Report

Recreation Ground
Attendance: 560
Referee: James Milliner-Woodcock

15 December 2018
14:00

Worthing Raiders	10 – 0	Dings Crusaders
	Report

Roundstone Lane
Attendance: 225
Referee: Jack Sutton

15 December 2018
14:30

Birmingham & Solihull	0 – 53	Rams (1 BP)
	Report

Portway
Attendance: 150
Referee: James Clarke

15 December 2018
14:30

Clifton	14 – 37	Tonbridge Juddians (1 BP)
	Report

Station Road
Attendance: 101
Referee: Andrew Wigley

15 December 2018
15:00

(1 BP) Canterbury	38 – 5	Barnes
	Report

The Marine Travel Ground
Attendance: 256
Referee: Samuel Phillips

15 December 2018
15:00

(1 BP) Henley Hawks	33 – 12	Old Albanian
	Report

Dry Leas
Attendance: 379
Referee: Philip Davies

15 December 2018
15:00

London Irish Wild Geese	5 – 26	Bury St Edmunds (1 BP)
	Report

Hazelwood
Attendance: 104
Referee: Matthew Sharpe

15 December 2018
15:00

(1 BP) Taunton Titans	60 – 14	Guernsey
	Report

Commsplus Stadium
Attendance: 400
Referee: Adam Wookey

=== Round 16 ===
22 December 2018
14:00

(1 BP) Barnes	17 – 24	Henley Hawks (1 BP)
	Report

Barn Elms
Attendance: 163
Referee: Benjamin Russell

22 December 2018
14:00

(1 BP) Rams	40 – 12	London Irish Wild Geese
	Report

Old Bath Road
Attendance: 543
Referee: Jonathan Cook

22 December 2018
14:00

(1 BP) Worthing Raiders	43 – 36	Guernsey (2 BP)
	Report

Roundstone Lane
Attendance: 610
Referee: Samuel Phillips

22 December 2018
14:30

Old Redcliffians	20 – 10	Birmingham & Solihull
	Report

Scotland Lane
Attendance: 327
Referee: Ben Wilde

22 December 2018
14:30

Tonbridge Juddians	23 – 18	Canterbury (1 BP)
	Report

The Slade
Attendance: 471 (Note: The Rugby Paper gives an attendance of 471 while Rugby Statbunker gives a figure of 300. As this is a Christmas fixture the larger figure will be used until more can be revealed.)
Referee: Ieuan Davies

22 December 2018
15:00

Bury St Edmunds	24 – 22	Old Albanian (1 BP)
	Report

The Haberden
Attendance: 521
Referee: George Richardson

22 December 2018
15:00

Dings Crusaders	13 – 22	Clifton (1 BP)
	Report

Shaftsbury Park
Attendance: 850 (Note: The Rugby Paper gives an attendance of 850 while Rugby Statbunker gives a figure of 552. As this was the first ever league meeting between Dings and Clifton at Shaftsbury Avenue, the larger figure will be used until more is revealed.)
Referee: Jack Sutton

22 December 2018
15:00

(1 BP) Taunton Titans	35 – 33	Redruth (2 BP)
	Report

Commsplus Stadium
Attendance: 720
Referee: Hamish Grant

=== Round 17 ===
5 January 2019
14:00

Guernsey	19 – 27	Bury St Edmunds (1 BP)
	Report

Footes Lane
Attendance: 483
Referee: Ieuan Davies

5 January 2019
14:00

Redruth	17 – 28	Worthing Raiders
	Report

Recreation Ground
Attendance: 530
Referee: Adam Wookey

5 January 2019
14:30

Birmingham & Solihull	25 – 15	Dings Crusaders
	Report

Portway
Attendance: 105
Referee: Timothy Allatt

5 January 2019
14:30

(2 BP) Clifton	42 – 48	Taunton Titans (1 BP)
	Report

Station Road
Attendance: 151
Referee: Benjamin Russell

5 January 2019
15:00

(1 BP) Canterbury	47 – 12	Old Redcliffians
	Report

The Marine Travel Ground
Attendance: 231
Referee: Jack Sutton

5 January 2019
15:00

(1 BP) Henley Hawks	12 – 19	Rams
	Report

Dry Leas
Attendance: 1,160
Referee: Nick Wood

5 January 2019
15:00

(1 BP) London Irish Wild Geese	44 – 31	Tonbridge Juddians (1 BP)
	Report

Hazelwood
Attendance: 272
Referee: Andrew MacNeaney

5 January 2019
15:00

(1 BP) Old Albanian	20 – 24	Barnes
	Report

Woollam Playing Fields
Attendance: 298
Referee: Benjamin Wilde

=== Round 18 ===
12 January 2019
13:00

(1 BP) Redruth	32 – 5	Guernsey
	Report

Recreation Ground
Attendance: 695
Referee: James Milliner-Woodcock

12 January 2019
14:00

Barnes	24 – 24	Bury St Edmunds
	Report

Barn Elms
Attendance: 234
Referee: Andrew Wigley

12 January 2019
14:00

(1 BP) Rams	36 – 21	Old Albanian
	Report

Old Bath Road
Attendance: 463
Referee: Daniel Collins

12 January 2019
14:00

(1 BP) Worthing Raiders	29 – 47	Clifton (1 BP)
	Report

Roundstone Lane
Attendance: 419
Referee: Phillip Davies

12 January 2019
14:30

(1 BP) Old Redcliffians	37 – 22	London Irish Wild Geese
	Report

Scotland Lane
Attendance: 138
Referee: Ben Russell

12 January 2019
14:30

Tonbridge Juddians	23 – 12	Henley Hawks
	Report

The Slade
Attendance: 190
Referee: Jonathan Cook

12 January 2019
15:00

Dings Crusaders	23 – 20	Canterbury (1 BP)
	Report

Shaftesbury Park
Attendance: 287 (Note: The Rugby Paper gives an attendance of 287 while Rugby Statbunker gives a figure of 250. As the Rugby Statbunker figure seems rounded down, The Rugby Paper attendance will be used.)
Referee: Alan Chandrachud

12 January 2019
15:00

(1 BP) Taunton Titans	27 – 17	Birmingham & Solihull
	Report

Commsplus Stadium
Attendance: 375
Referee: Sam Phillips

=== Round 19 ===
19 January 2019
14:00

Guernsey	22 – 21	Barnes (1 BP)
	Report

Footes Lane
Attendance: 789
Referee: Samuel Phillips

19 January 2019
14:30

Birmingham & Solihull	18 – 0	Worthing Raiders
	Report

Portway
Attendance: 182 (Note: The Rugby Paper gives an attendance of 182 while Rugby Statbunker gives a figure of 150. As the Rugby Statbunker figure seems rounded down, The Rugby Paper attendance will be used.)
Referee: Benjamin Davis

19 January 2019
14:30

Clifton	24 – 15	Redruth
	Report

Station Road
Attendance: 121
Referee: Dan Parrott

19 January 2019
15:00

Bury St Edmunds	3 – 19	Rams
	Report

The Haberden
Attendance: 435
Referee: Matthew Sharpe

19 January 2019
15:00

(1 BP) Canterbury	26 – 24	Taunton Titans (2 BP)
	Report

The Marine Travel Ground
Attendance: 327
Referee: Andrew Wigley

19 January 2019
15:00

(1 BP) Henley Hawks	42 – 31	Old Redcliffians (1 BP)
	Report

Dry Leas
Attendance: 295
Referee: Adam Wookey

19 January 2019
15:00

(1 BP) London Irish Wild Geese	31 – 24	Dings Crusaders (2 BP)
	Report

Hazelwood
Attendance: 158
Referee: Jack Sutton

19 January 2019
15:00

Old Albanian	12 – 57	Tonbridge Juddians (1 BP)
	Report

Woollam Playing Fields
Attendance: 323
Referee: James Clark

=== Round 20 ===
26 January 2019
14:00

(1 BP) Rams	48 – 14	Barnes
	Report

Old Bath Road
Attendance: 501
Referee: James Clarke

26 January 2019
14:00

(1 BP) Redruth	29 – 25	Birmingham & Solihull (1 BP)
	Report

Recreation Ground
Attendance: 525
Referee: Andrew Wigley

26 January 2019
14:00

Worthing Raiders	21 – 34	Canterbury (1 BP)
	Report

Roundstone Lane
Attendance: 383
Referee: Andrew MacNeaney

26 January 2019
14:30

(1 BP) Old Redcliffians	37 – 15	Old Albanian
	Report

Scotland Lane
Attendance: 75
Referee: Ben Wilde

26 January 2019
14:30

(1 BP) Tonbridge Juddians	27 – 15	Bury St Edmunds
	Report

The Slade
Attendance: 152
Referee: Sam Phillips

26 January 2019
15:00

(1 BP) Clifton	14 – 16	Guernsey
	Report

Station Road
Attendance: 149
Referee: George Richardson

26 January 2019
15:00

(1 BP) Dings Crusaders	10 – 13	Henley Hawks
	Report

Shaftesbury Park
Attendance: 287 (Note: The Rugby Paper gives an attendance of 287 while Rugby Statbunker gives a figure of 250. As the Rugby Statbunker figure seems rounded down, The Rugby Paper attendance will be used.)
Referee: Ben Russell

26 January 2019
15:00

(1 BP) Taunton Titans	27 – 3	London Irish Wild Geese
	Report

Commsplus Stadium
Attendance: 425
Referee: James Milliner-Woodcock

=== Round 21 ===
2 February 2019
14:00

Guernsey	8 – 59	Rams (1 BP)
	Report

Footes Lane
Attendance: 756
Referee: Daniel Collins

2 February 2019
14:30

Barnes	17 – 29	Tonbridge Juddians (1 BP)
	Report

Barn Elms
Attendance: 143
Referee: Calum Howard

2 February 2019
14:30

Birmingham & Solihull	P – P	Clifton

Portway

- Postponed due to poor weather (snow). Game to be rescheduled for 23 February 2019.

2 February 2019
14:30

Henley Hawks	P – P	Taunton Titans

Dry Leas

- Postponed due to poor weather (snow). Game to be rescheduled for 23 February 2019.

2 February 2019
15:00

(1 BP) Bury St Edmunds	57 – 7	Old Redcliffians

The Haberden
Attendance: 279
Referee: Phillip Davies

2 February 2019
15:00

(1 BP) Canterbury	46 – 14	Redruth
	Report

The Marine Travel Ground
Attendance: 219
Referee: Jonathan Cook

2 February 2019
15:00

London Irish Wild Geese	22 – 19	Worthing Raiders (1 BP)
	Report

Hazelwood
Attendance: 233
Referee: Matthew Sharpe

2 February 2019
15:00

Old Albanian	P – P	Dings Crusaders

Woollam Playing Fields

- Postponed due to poor weather (snow). Game to be rescheduled for 23 February 2019.

=== Round 22 ===
9 February 2019
14:00

Worthing Raiders	19 – 42	Henley Hawks (1 BP)
	Report

Roundstone Lane
Attendance: 355
Referee: Hamish Grant

9 February 2019
14:30

(1 BP) Birmingham & Solihull	39 – 20	Guernsey
	Report

Portway
Attendance: 157 (Note: The Rugby Paper gives an attendance of 157 while Rugby Statbunker gives a figure of 150. As the Rugby Statbunker figure seems rounded down, The Rugby Paper attendance will be used.)
Referee: Daniel Wood

9 February 2019
14:30

Clifton	17 – 39	Canterbury (1 BP)
	Report

Station Road
Attendance: 114
Referee: Andrew MacNeaney

9 February 2019
14:30

Old Redcliffians	23 – 15	Barnes
	Report

Scotland Lane
Attendance: 182
Referee: Jack Sutton

9 February 2019
14:30

(1 BP) Redruth	39 – 3	London Irish Wild Geese
	Report

Recreation Ground
Attendance: 535
Referee: Ben Wilde

9 February 2019
14:30

Tonbridge Juddians	25 – 19	Rams (1 BP)
	Report

The Slade
Attendance: 203
Referee: Iain Kiy

9 February 2019
15:00

Dings Crusaders	21 – 14	Bury St Edmunds (1 BP)
	Report

Shaftesbury Park
Attendance: 150
Referee: Benjamin Davis

9 February 2019
15:00

Taunton Titans	10 – 8	Old Albanian (1 BP)
	Report

Commsplus Stadium
Attendance: 250
Referee: Jack Lewars

=== Round 23 ===
16 February 2019
14:00

Guernsey	17 – 35	Tonbridge Juddians (1 BP)
	Report

Footes Lane
Attendance: 434
Referee: Dan Parrott

16 February 2019
14:00

(1 BP) Rams	31 – 15	Old Redcliffians
	Report

Old Bath Road
Attendance: 421
Referee: Ieuan Davies

16 February 2019
14:30

Barnes	20 – 15	Dings Crusaders (1 BP)
	Report

Barn Elms
Attendance: 103
Referee: Philip Davies

16 February 2019
15:00

(1 BP) Bury St Edmunds	22 – 24	Taunton Titans (1 BP)
	Report

The Haberden
Attendance: 437
Referee: Luke Davies

16 February 2019
15:00

(1 BP) Canterbury	38 – 9	Birmingham & Solihull
	Report

The Marine Travel Ground
Attendance: 347
Referee: Jack Sutton

16 February 2019
15:00

Henley Hawks	21 – 17	Redruth (1 BP)
	Report

Dry Leas
Attendance: 370
Referee: Matthew Sharpe

16 February 2019
15:00

(2 BP) London Irish Wild Geese	26 – 30	Clifton (1 BP)
	Report

Hazelwood
Attendance: 253
Referee: Hamish Smales

16 February 2019
15:00

(1 BP) Old Albanian	34 – 34	Worthing Raiders (1 BP)
	Report

Woollam Playing Fields
Attendance: 256
Referee: Iain Kiy

=== Round 21 (rescheduled games) ===
23 February 2019
14:30

(1 BP) Birmingham & Solihull	28 – 28	Clifton (1 BP)
	Report

Portway
Attendance: 235
Referee: Sam Phillips

- Game rescheduled from 2 February 2019.

23 February 2019
15:00

Old Albanian	22 – 12	Dings Crusaders
	Report

Woollam Playing Fields
Attendance: 176
Referee: Hamish Grant

- Game rescheduled from 2 February 2019.

24 February 2019
14:00

(1 BP) Henley Hawks	38 – 5	Taunton Titans
	Report

Dry Leas
Attendance: 265
Referee: Veryan Boscawen

- Game rescheduled from 2 February 2019.

=== Round 24 ===
2 March 2019
14:00

(1 BP) Canterbury	38 – 15	Guernsey
	Report

The Marine Travel Ground
Attendance: 480
Referee: Philip Davies

2 March 2019
14:00

(1 BP) Birmingham & Solihull	33 – 12	London Irish Wild Geese
	Report

Portway
Attendance: 180
Referee: Adam Wookey

2 March 2019
14:30

(2 BP) Clifton	35 – 40	Henley Hawks (1 BP)
	Report

Station Road
Attendance: 157
Referee: Jack Sutton

2 March 2019
14:30

(1 BP) Old Redcliffians	24 – 40	Tonbridge Juddians (1 BP)
	Report

Scotland Lane
Attendance: 101
Referee: Luke Davies

2 March 2019
15:00

Dings Crusaders	19 – 48	Rams (1 BP)
	Report

Shaftesbury Park
Attendance: 475
Referee: Iain Kiy

2 March 2019
15:00

(1 BP) Redruth	33 – 15	Old Albanian
	Report

Recreation Ground
Attendance: 590
Referee: Samuel Phillips

2 March 2019
15:00

Taunton Titans	20 – 19	Barnes (1 BP)
	Report

Commsplus Stadium
Attendance: 350
Referee: James Milliner-Woodcock

2 March 2019
15:00

(1 BP) Worthing Raiders	22 – 24	Bury St Edmunds
	Report

Roundstone Lane
Attendance: 410
Referee: Benjamin Wilde

=== Round 25 ===
9 March 2019
14:00

(1 BP) Bury St Edmunds	17 – 19	Redruth
	Report

The Haberden
Attendance: 369
Referee: Carl Adams

9 March 2019
14:00

(1 BP) Guernsey	24 – 17	Old Redcliffians (1 BP)
	Report

Footes Lane
Attendance: 722
Referee: Andrew Wigley

9 March 2019
14:30

(1 BP) Henley Hawks	31 – 22	Birmingham & Solihull
	Report

Dry Leas
Attendance: 236
Referee: James Milliner-Woodcock

9 March 2019
14:30

(1 BP) Rams	42 – 21	Taunton Titans
	Report

Old Bath Road
Attendance: 341
Referee: Benjamin Russell

9 March 2019
15:00

(1 BP) Barnes	28 – 26	Worthing Raiders (2 BP)
	Report

Barn Elms
Attendance: 157
Referee: Jack Le Feuvre

9 March 2019
15:00

London Irish Wild Geese	13 – 45	Canterbury (1 BP)
	Report

Hazelwood
Attendance: 200
Referee: Jack Sutton

9 March 2019
15:00

(1 BP) Old Albanian	49 – 24	Clifton
	Report

Woollam Playing Fields
Attendance: 423
Referee: Ben Wilde

9 March 2019
15:00

(1 BP) Tonbridge Juddians	26 – 0	Dings Crusaders
	Report

The Slade
Attendance: 243
Referee: Sam Phillips

=== Round 26 ===
23 March 2019
14:30

(1 BP) Birmingham & Solihull	45 – 32	Old Albanian (1 BP)
	Report

Portway
Attendance: 150
Referee: Ben Rayner

23 March 2019
14:30

(1 BP) Clifton	24 – 22	Bury St Edmunds (2 BP)
	Report

Station Road
Attendance: 174
Referee: Philip Davies

23 March 2019
15:00

(1 BP) Canterbury	33 – 26	Henley Hawks (2 BP)
	Report

The Marine Travel Ground
Attendance: 643
Referee: Calum Howard

23 March 2019
15:00

Dings Crusaders	22 – 17	Old Redcliffians (1 BP)
	Report

Shaftesbury Park
Attendance: 823 (Note: The Rugby Paper gives an attendance of 823 while Rugby Statbunker gives a figure of just 200. From speaking to Dings officials it turns out that The Rugby Paper figure is correct.)
Referee: Richard Haughton

23 March 2019
15:00

(1 BP) London Irish Wild Geese	38 – 47	Guernsey (1 BP)
	Report

Hazelwood
Attendance: 140
Referee: Chris Bloomfield

23 March 2019
15:00

(1 BP) Redruth	20 – 22	Barnes
	Report

Recreation Ground
Attendance: 620
Referee: James Milliner-Woodcock

23 March 2019
15:00

Taunton Titans	10 – 22	Tonbridge Juddians (1 BP)
	Report

Commsplus Stadium
Attendance: 475
Referee: Andrew MacNeaney

23 March 2019
15:00

Worthing Raiders	7 – 53	Rams (1 BP)
	Report

Roundstone Lane
Attendance: 381
Referee: Jonathan Cook

=== Round 27 ===
30 March 2019
14:00

(1 BP) Guernsey	27 – 22	Dings Crusaders (1 BP)
	Report

Footes Lane
Attendance: 766
Referee: Matthew Sharpe

30 March 2019
14:30

(1 BP) Rams	28 – 10	Redruth
	Report

Old Bath Road
Attendance: 586
Referee: Adam Wookey

30 March 2019
15:00

(1 BP) Barnes	15 – 22	Clifton
	Report

Barn Elms
Attendance: 166
Referee: Jack Sutton

30 March 2019
15:00

(2 BP) Bury St Edmunds	26 – 29	Birmingham & Solihull (1 BP)
	Report

The Haberden
Attendance: 391
Referee: James Clarke

30 March 2019
15:00

(1 BP) Henley Hawks	52 – 0	London Irish Wild Geese
	Report

Dry Leas
Attendance: 352
Referee: George Richardson

- London Irish Wild Geese are relegated.

30 March 2019
15:00

Old Albanian	5 – 19	Canterbury
	Report

Woollam Playing Fields
Attendance: 325
Referee: Ben Rayner

30 March 2019
15:00

Old Redcliffians	22 – 17	Taunton Titans (1 BP)
	Report

Scotland Lane
Attendance: 312
Referee: Daniel Collins

30 March 2019
15:00

(1 BP) Tonbridge Juddians	31 – 28	Worthing Raiders (2 BP)
	Report

The Slade
Attendance: 271 (Note: The Rugby Paper gives an attendance of 271 while Rugby Statbunker gives a figure of 280. As the Rugby Statbunker figure seems rounded up, The Rugby Paper figure will be used.)
Referee: Samuel Phillips

=== Round 28 ===
6 April 2019
14:00

Redruth	23 – 37	Tonbridge Juddians (1 BP)
	Report

Recreation Ground
Attendance: 545
Referee: Andrew Wigley

6 April 2019
14:15

(1 BP) Henley Hawks	60 – 28	Guernsey (1 BP)
	Report

Dry Leas
Attendance: 429
Referee: Daniel Collins

- Guernsey are relegated.

6 April 2019
14:30

Birmingham & Solihull	6 – 41	Barnes (1 BP)
	Report

Portway
Attendance: 160
Referee: Tim Allatt

6 April 2019
14:30

Clifton	21 – 45	Rams (1 BP)
	Report

Station Road
Attendance: 308
Referee: Dan Rowlands

- Rams are champions.

6 April 2019
15:00

(1 BP) Canterbury	35 – 23	Bury St Edmunds
	Report

The Marine Travel Ground
Attendance: 513
Referee: Veryan Boscawen

6 April 2019
15:00

London Irish Wild Geese	5 – 61	Old Albanian (1 BP)
	Report

Hazelwood
Attendance: 211
Referee: Henry Lowis

6 April 2019
15:00

(1 BP) Taunton Titans	32 – 30	Dings Crusaders (2 BP)
	Report

Commsplus Stadium
Attendance: 450
Referee: James Sutton

6 April 2019
15:00

(1 BP) Worthing Raiders	39 – 33	Old Redcliffians (2 BP)
	Report

Roundstone Lane
Attendance: 503
Referee: Benjamin Wilde

=== Round 29 ===
13 April 2019
14:30

(1 BP) Rams	38 – 24	Birmingham & Solihull (1 BP)
	Report

Old Bath Road
Attendance: 742
Referee: Samuel Phillips

- Birmingham & Solihull are relegated.

13 April 2019
15:00

Barnes	22 – 33	Canterbury (1 BP)
	Report

Barn Elms
Attendance: 482
Referee: Andrew MacNeaney

- Canterbury qualify for promotion play-off.

13 April 2019
15:00

(1 BP) Bury St Edmunds	53 – 7	London Irish Wild Geese
	Report

The Haberden
Attendance: 611
Referee: Jack Sutton

13 April 2019
15:00

(2 BP) Dings Crusaders	33 – 36	Worthing Raiders (1 BP)
	Report

Shaftesbury Park
Attendance: 476
Referee: James-Milliner Woodcock

13 April 2019
15:00

Old Albanian	21 – 50	Henley Hawks (1 BP)
	Report

Woollam Playing Fields
Attendance: 523
Referee: Timothy Allatt

13 April 2019
15:00

(1 BP) Old Redcliffians	51 – 24	Redruth (1 BP)
	Report

Scotland Lane
Attendance: 280
Referee: Luke Davies

13 April 2019
15:00

(1 BP) Tonbridge Juddians	55 – 12	Clifton
	Report

The Slade
Attendance: 243
Referee: Ben Wilde

13 April 2019
17:30

Guernsey	19 – 50	Taunton Titans (1 BP)
	Report

Footes Lane
Attendance: 587
Referee: Jack Lewars

=== Round 30 ===
27 April 2019
15:00

(1 BP) Birmingham & Solihull	24 – 47	Tonbridge Juddians (1 BP)
	Report

Portway
Attendance: 175
Referee: George Richardson

27 April 2019
15:00

Canterbury	14 – 31	Rams (1 BP)
	Report

The Marine Travel Ground
Attendance: 383
Referee: Philip Davies

27 April 2019
15:00

Clifton	17 – 0	Old Redcliffians
	Report

Station Road
Attendance: 325
Referee: Nick Wood

27 April 2019
15:00

(1 BP) Guernsey	26 – 19	Old Albanian (1 BP)
	Report

Footes Lane
Attendance: 581
Referee: Jack Sutton

27 April 2019
15:00

(1 BP) Henley Hawks	33 – 12	Bury St Edmunds
	Report

Dry Leas
Attendance: 408
Referee: Andrew Wigley

27 April 2019
15:00

London Irish Wild Geese	21 – 29	Barnes (1 BP)
	Report

Hazelwood
Attendance: 380
Referee: Neil Sweeney

27 April 2019
15:00

(1 BP) Redruth	33 – 20	Dings Crusaders
	Report

Recreation Ground
Attendance: 635
Referee: Benjamin Russell

27 April 2019
15:00

(1 BP) Worthing Raiders	66 – 31	Taunton Titans (1 BP)
	Report

Roundstone Lane
Attendance: 603
Referee: Richard Haughton

== Promotion play-off ==
Each season, the runners-up in the National League 2 North and National League 2 South participate in a play-off for promotion to National League 1. Canterbury were runners up in the 2018–19 National League 2 South, and because they had a better record than the 2018–19 National League 2 North runners up, Chester, they host the play-off match.

Team	Pld	W	D	L	PF	PA	PD	TB	LB	Pts
Canterbury (P)	30	24	0	6	894	564	+330	21	4	121
Chester	30	21	1	8	748	542	+206	19	4	109

(P) Promoted

4 May 2019
15:00

Canterbury	19 – 10	Chester

The Marine Travel Ground
Attendance: 1,114
Referee: Charles Gayther

== Attendances ==
- Does not include promotion play-off.

Club	Home games	Total	Average	Highest	Lowest	% Capacity
Barnes	15	2,642	176	482	75	35%
Birmingham & Solihull	15	2,673	178	253	105	
Bury St Edmunds	15	5,969	398	611	241	13%
Canterbury	15	5,059	337	643	183	22%
Clifton	15	2,412	161	325	98	7%
Dings Crusaders	15	6,358	424	850	150	19%
Guernsey	15	8,820	588	851	367	12%
Henley Hawks	15	5,774	385	1,160	205	13%
London Irish Wild Geese	15	2,984	199	380	104	10%
Old Albanian	15	4,320	288	523	176	29%
Old Redcliffians	15	3,013	201	328	68	20%
Rams	15	6,785	452	742	303	36%
Redruth	15	9,110	607	810	485	17%
Taunton Titans	15	6,292	419	720	250	21%
Tonbridge Juddians	15	3,033	202	471	133	13%
Worthing Raiders	15	6,744	450	610	225	30%

== Individual statistics ==
- Note that points scorers includes tries as well as conversions, penalties and drop goals. Appearance figures also include coming on as substitutes (unused substitutes not included). Does not include promotion play-off.

=== Top points scorers ===
Rank	Player	Team	Appearances	Points
1	(Wales) Matthew McLean	Worthing Raiders	30	341
2	(England) Will Robinson	Tonbridge Juddians	30	327
3	(England) Daniel Watt	Old Albanian	28	210
4	(England) Jack Jolly	Birmingham & Solihull	30	199
5	(England) Ollie Best	Canterbury	24	191
6	(England) Alex Seers	Rams	26	186
7	(England) Kieran Hill	Old Redcliffians	24	178
8	(England) Gary Kingdom	Taunton Titans	25	176
9	(England) Ben Bolster	Dings Crusaders; Henley Hawks	20	157
10	(England) Bradley Barnes	Clifton	20	131

=== Top try scorers ===
Rank	Player	Team	Appearances	Tries
1	(England) Henry Bird	Old Redcliffians	27	26
2	(Wales) Matthew McLean	Worthing Raiders	30	22
3	(England) Ben Henderson	Rams	29	21
4	(England) Jak Rossiter	Rams	29	18
4	(England) Matthew Dight	Birmingham & Solihull	29	18
5	(England) Curtis Barnes	Worthing Raiders	24	17
6	(England) Nick Mason	Taunton Titans	23	16
6	(England) George Owen	London Irish Wild Geese	25	16
6	(England) Mark Kohler	Bury St Edmunds	26	16
6	(England) Ricky Mackintosh	Canterbury	28	16

== Season records ==
=== Team ===
Largest home win — 56 points

56 – 0 Old Albanian at home to London Irish Wild Geese on 8 December 2018

Largest away win — 56 points

61 – 5 Old Albanian away to London Irish Wild Geese on 6 April 2019

Most points scored — 70 points

70 – 26 Bury St Edmunds at home to Guernsey on 15 September 2018

Most tries in a match — 12

Bury St Edmunds at home to Guernsey on 15 September 2018

Most conversions in a match — 9

Worthing Raiders at home to Redruth on 15 September 2018

Most penalties in a match — 5

Tonbridge Juddians at home Old Redcliffians on 3 November 2018

Most drop goals in a match — 1 (3)

Old Albanian away to Barnes on 15 September 2018
Clifton away to Canterbury on 20 October 2018
Old Redcliffians away to Redruth on 15 December 2018

=== Attendances ===
Highest — 1,160

Henley Hawks at home to Rams on 5 January 2019

Lowest — 68

Old Redcliffians at home to Worthing Raiders on 8 December 2018

Highest average attendance — 607

Redruth

Lowest average attendance — 161

Clifton

=== Player ===
Most points in a match — 34

(England) Daniel Watt for Old Albanian away to London Irish Wild Geese on 6 April 2019

Most tries in a match — 5

(England) Henry Bird for Old Redcliffians at home to Guernsey on 17 November 2018

Most conversions in a match — 9

(Wales) Matthew McLean for Worthing Raiders at home to Redruth on 15 September 2018

Most penalties in a match — 5

(England) Will Robinson for Tonbridge Juddians at home to Old Redcliffians on 3 November 2018

Most drop goals in a match — 1 (3)

(England) Tom Bednall for Old Albanian away to Barnes on 15 September 2018
(England) Bradley Barnes for Clifton away to Canterbury on 20 October 2018
(England) Kieran Hill for Old Redcliffians away to Redruth on 15 December 2018

== See also ==
- English rugby union system
- Rugby union in England
