= 2018–19 National League 2 North =

Rugby union competition in England

- Countries: England
- Date: 1 September 2018 – 5 May 2019
- Champions: Hull Ionians (3rd title)
- Runners-up: Chester (not promoted)
- Relegated: Peterborough Lions, South Leicester, Macclesfield
- Matches played: 240
- Attendance: 78,870 (average 329 per match)
- Highest attendance: 1,794; Fylde v Preston Grasshoppers; 22 December 2018
- Lowest attendance: 37; South Leicester v Sedgley Park; 30 March 2019
- Top point scorer: (England) Lewis Minikin (Hull Ionians); 315 points
- Top try scorer: (England) Morgan Passman (Tynedale); 31 tries

The 2018–19 National League 2 North is the tenth season (32nd overall) of the fourth tier (north) of the English domestic rugby union competitions since the professionalised format of the second division was introduced.

Hull Ionians finished as champions following a bonus point home victory Leicester Lions on 13 April 2019, which sealed the league title with one round still to go. It was Ionians third National League 2 North title, equalling the record set by Macclesfield. It was a competitive league battle, with four teams looking like they could win but in the end Hull Ionians just did enough to claim the title, 4 points ahead of second placed Chester, who qualified for the promotion play-off. On 4 May 2019, Chester lost 10–19 away to National League 2 South runners up, Canterbury. That result meant that only Ionians would be promoted from the division, joining the 2019–20 National League 1 after just one season away.

At the other end of the table, newcomers Peterborough Lions were the first side to be relegated on 9 March 2019, with five games still to play, after they lost at home to Preston Grasshoppers. A week later a win for Sheffield Tigers on 6 April ensured the Sheffield based clubs safety, whilst condemning both Macclesfield and South Leicester to the drop, despite South Leicester winning their fixture away from home. Peterborough Lions and South Leicester would drop into Midlands Premier, while Macclesfield would fall to North Premier.

Another interesting fact from the season was the lowest ever recorded attendance in National League 2 North of just 37 who attended South Leicester's home game against Sedgley Park on 30 March 2019. (Note: Prior to South Leicester's attendance of 37, the lowest recorded attendance had been set by West Park St Helens during the 2007–08 season when a crowd of just 39 attended the home game against Leicester Lions on 15 December 2007. Note that this only refers to recorded attendances in tier 4 (north) and there may have been lower attendances since the division was created back in 1987 as Area League North.) South Leicester also set an overall low attendance record for the division, averaging just 85 supporters per game. (Note: South Leicester' average attendance of 85 broke the previous low of 89 set by West Park St Helens during the 2007–08 season. Note that this only refers to recorded attendances in tier 4 (north) and there may have been clubs with lower average attendances since the division's inception back in 1987 as Area League North.)

== Structure ==
The league consists of sixteen teams with all the teams playing each other on a home and away basis to make a total of thirty matches each. There is one automatic promotion place, one play-off place and three relegation places. The champions are promoted to the 2019–20 National League 1 and the runners up play the second-placed team in the 2018–19 National League 2 South with the winner also being promoted. The last three teams are relegated to either North Premier or Midlands Premier depending on the geographical location of the team (in some cases teams may join the southern regional leagues).

The results of the matches contribute points to the league as follows:

- 4 points are awarded for a win
- 2 points are awarded for a draw
- 0 points are awarded for a loss, however
- 1 losing (bonus) point is awarded to a team that loses a match by 7 points or fewer
- 1 additional (bonus) point is awarded to a team scoring 4 tries or more in a match.

== Participating teams and locations ==
Twelve of the teams listed below participated in the 2017–18 National League 2 North season. The 2017–18 champions Sale FC were promoted into the 2018–19 National League 1, replacing Fylde and Hull Ionians who were relegated from the 2017–18 National League 1. The three teams relegated from National League 2 North the previous season were Sheffield and Luctonians (both Midlands Premier) and Blaydon (North Premier).

The promoted teams include Preston Grasshoppers from North Premier (champions) who return to the division after an absence of just one season, while Peterborough Lions came up from Midlands Premier (playoffs). Midlands Premier champions Birmingham & Solihull were level transferred to the 2018–19 National League 2 South due to an imbalance of teams, being considered the most southerly team in the division.

Locations of the 2018–19 National League 2 North teams

Team	Ground	Capacity	City/Area	Previous season
Chester	Hare Lane	2,000 (500 seats)	Chester, Cheshire	7th
Fylde	Woodlands Memorial Ground	7,500 (500 seats)	Lytham St. Annes, Lancashire	Relegated from National League 1 (16th)
Hinckley	De Montfort Park	2,000	Hinckley, Leicestershire	5th
Huddersfield	Lockwood Park	1,500 (500 seats)	Huddersfield, West Yorkshire	6th
Hull Ionians	Brantingham Park	1,500 (240 seats)	Brantingham, East Riding of Yorkshire	Relegated from National League 1 (14th)
Leicester Lions	Westleigh Park	2,000	Blaby, Leicestershire	12th
Macclesfield	Priory Park	1,250 (250 seats)	Macclesfield, Cheshire	8th
Otley	Cross Green	7,000 (852 seats)	Otley, Leeds, West Yorkshire	11th
Peterborough Lions	Bretton Woods		Bretton, Cambridgeshire	Promoted from Midlands Premier (playoff)
Preston Grasshoppers	Lightfoot Green	2,250 (250 seats)	Preston, Lancashire	Promoted from North Premier (champions)
Sedgley Park	Park Lane	3,000	Whitefield, Bury, Greater Manchester	2nd (lost playoff)
Sheffield Tigers	Dore Moor	1,000	Sheffield, South Yorkshire	10th
South Leicester	Welford Road Ground		Leicester, Leicestershire	9th
Stourbridge	Stourton Park	3,500 (499 seats)	Stourbridge, West Midlands	3rd
Tynedale	Tynedale Park	2,000 (400 seats)	Corbridge, Northumberland	4th
Wharfedale	The Avenue	2,000	Threshfield, North Yorkshire	13th

== League table ==
2018–19 National League 2 North table
Pos	Team	Pld	W	D	L	PF	PA	PD	TB	LB	Pts	Qualification
1	Hull Ionians (C)	30	23	0	7	837	647	+190	18	3	113	Promotion place
2	Chester (PO)	30	21	1	8	748	542	+206	19	4	109	Play-off place
3	Sedgley Park	30	19	0	11	883	641	+242	19	6	101	
4	Huddersfield	30	19	1	10	806	664	+142	13	7	98	
5	Tynedale	30	17	2	11	848	724	+124	21	3	96	
6	Fylde	30	18	1	11	808	583	+225	15	4	93	
7	Preston Grasshoppers	30	16	0	14	796	676	+120	17	9	90	
8	Wharfedale	30	16	0	14	676	622	+54	12	6	82	
9	Otley	30	17	0	13	646	643	+3	14	3	81 (Note: Otley were deducted 4 points by the RFU after selecting an underage player to represent their 2nd XV on 19th January 2019 against Ripton 2nd XV, with the points deduction applying to the 1st XV side. An additional 4 points were suspended until the end of the season in the event that the club commits a similar offence.)	
10	Hinckley	30	15	2	13	729	680	+49	13	4	81	
11	Stourbridge	30	13	1	16	868	860	+8	17	6	77	
12	Leicester Lions	30	13	1	16	706	711	−5	13	8	75	
13	Sheffield Tigers	30	9	1	20	728	780	−52	11	13	62	
14	Macclesfield (R)	30	7	0	23	631	973	−342	13	6	47	Relegation place
15	South Leicester (R)	30	7	1	22	664	1112	−448	11	4	45	Relegation place
16	Peterborough Lions (R)	30	4	1	25	497	1013	−516	7	3	28	Relegation place

Updated to match(es) played on 27 April 2019. Source: "National League 2 North". NCA Rugby.
Rules for classification: If teams are level at any stage, tiebreakers are applied in the following order:
1. Number of matches won
2. Difference between points for and against
3. Total number of points for
4. Aggregate number of points scored in matches between tied teams
5. Number of matches won excluding the first match, then the second and so on until the tie is settled
  Notes:

== Fixtures & Results ==
=== Round 1 ===
1 September 2018
15:00

(1 BP) Chester	48 – 37	Preston Grasshoppers (1 BP)
	Report

Hare Lane
Attendance: 424
Referee: Llyr ApGeraint-Roberts

1 September 2018
15:00

(1 BP) Fylde	24 – 14	Otley
	Report

Woodlands Memorial Ground
Attendance: 589
Referee: Michael Harris

1 September 2018
15:00

(1 BP) Hinckley	45 – 31	Tynedale (1 BP)
	Report

De Montfort Park
Attendance: 385
Referee: Daniel Woods

1 September 2018
15:00

(1 BP) Huddersfield	24 – 29	Sedgley Park (1 BP)
	Report

Lockwood Park
Attendance: 294
Referee: Robert Tiere

1 September 2018
15:00

(1 BP) Hull Ionians	35 – 33	Sheffield Tigers (2 BP)
	Report

Brantingham Park
Attendance: 292
Referee: James O'Brien

1 September 2018
15:00

Peterborough Lions	12 – 26	Wharfedale (1 BP)
	Report

Bretton Woods
Attendance: 410
Referee: Tim Allatt

1 September 2018
15:00

(1 BP) South Leicester	47 – 24	Macclesfield (1 BP)
	Report

Welford Road Ground
Attendance: 91
Referee: Ben Rayner

1 September 2018
15:00

(1 BP) Stourbridge	42 – 25	Leicester Lions
	Report

Stourton Park
Attendance: 300
Referee: Charles Gayter

=== Round 2 ===
8 September 2018
14:00

(1 BP) Leicester Lions	21 – 24	South Leicester
	Report

Westleigh Park
Attendance: 273
Referee: Adam Wookey

8 September 2018
14:30

Otley	18 – 11	Huddersfield (1 BP)
	Report

Cross Green
Attendance: 250
Referee: Ben Rayner

8 September 2018
14:30

Peterborough Lions	21 – 48	Hinckley (1 BP)
	Report

Bretton Woods
Attendance: 187
Referee: George Richardson

8 September 2018
14:30

Preston Grasshoppers	18 – 15	Fylde (1 BP)
	Report

Lightfoot Green
Attendance: 1,023 (Note: The attendance figure given by The Rugby Paper for this game was 867. Although they had some difficulty calculating the attendance due to a lack of turnstiles, Preston Grasshopper officials gave the higher figure of 1,023.)
Referee: James O'Brien

8 September 2018
15:00

Macclesfield	10 – 24	Chester
	Report

Priory Park
Attendance: 194
Referee: Nathan Howarth

8 September 2018
15:00

Sheffield Tigers	24 – 11	Stourbridge
	Report

Dore Moor
Attendance: 161
Referee: Daniel Woods

8 September 2018
15:00

(1 BP) Tynedale	20 – 50	Hull Ionians (1 BP)
	Report

Tynedale Park
Attendance: 550
Referee: Benjamin Davis

8 September 2018
15:00

(1 BP) Wharfedale	26 – 19	Sedgley Park (1 BP)
	Report

The Avenue
Attendance: 556
Referee: Michael Harris

=== Round 3 ===
15 September 2018
14:30

(1 BP) Sedgley Park	40 – 10	Otley
	Report

Park Lane
Attendance: 200
Referee: Ieuan Davies

15 September 2018
15:00

(1 BP) Chester	24 – 12	Leicester Lions
	Report

Hare Lane
Attendance: 323
Referee: Benjamin Davis

15 September 2018
15:00

(1 BP) Fylde	46 – 8	Macclesfield
	Report

Woodlands Memorial Ground
Attendance: 575
Referee: Jamie Leahy

15 September 2018
15:00

Hinckley	33 – 24	Wharfedale
	Report

De Montfort Park
Attendance: 525 (Note: The attendance figure given by The Rugby Paper for this game was 178 while Statbunker gave a figure of 399. However, on consultation with the Hinckley club chairman it turns out that the official attendance was much higher at 525.)
Referee: Charles Gayther

15 September 2018
15:00

(1 BP) Huddersfield	28 – 27	Preston Grasshoppers (2 BP)
	Report

Lockwood Park
Attendance: 234
Referee: Michael Harris

15 September 2018
15:00

(1 BP) Hull Ionians	34 – 12	Peterborough Lions
	Report

Brantingham Park
Attendance: 163
Referee: Ben Rayner

15 September 2018
15:00

South Leicester	22 – 41	Sheffield Tigers (1 BP)
	Report

Welford Road Ground
Attendance: 79
Referee: Jack Sutton

15 September 2018
15:00

(1 BP) Stourbridge	29 – 24	Tynedale (2 BP)
	Report

Stourton Park
Attendance: 265 (Note: The Rugby Paper gives an attendance of 265 while Rugby Statbunker gives a figure of 250. As the Rugby Statbunker figure seems rounded down, the Rugby Paper stat will be used instead.)
Referee: Joe James

=== Round 4 ===
22 September 2018
14:00

(1 BP) Leicester Lions	31 – 41	Fylde (1 BP)
	Report

Westleigh Park
Attendance: 149
Referee: Joe James

22 September 2018
14:30

(2 BP) Preston Grasshoppers	31 – 36	Sedgley Park (1 BP)
	Report

Lightfoot Green
Attendance: 427
Referee: Ben Davis

22 September 2018
15:00

(1 BP) Hinckley	35 – 24	Hull Ionians (1 BP)
	Report

De Montfort Park
Attendance: 489 (Note: The attendance figure given by The Rugby Paper for this game was 327. However, on consultation with the Hinckley club chairman it turns out that the official attendance was actually 489.)
Referee: Andrew MacNeaney

22 September 2018
15:00

Macclesfield	15 – 26	Huddersfield (1 BP)
	Report

Priory Park
Attendance: 172
Referee: Charles Gayther

22 September 2018
15:00

Peterborough Lions	7 – 36	Stourbridge (1 BP)
	Report

Bretton Woods
Attendance: 150
Referee: Ieuan Davies

22 September 2018
15:00

(1 BP) Sheffield Tigers	18 – 24	Chester (1 BP)
	Report

Dore Moor
Attendance: 138
Referee: Ben Rayner

22 September 2018
15:00

(1 BP) Tynedale	33 – 33	South Leicester (1 BP)
	Report

Tynedale Park
Attendance: 380
Referee: Michael Harris

22 September 2018
15:00

(1 BP) Wharfedale	14 – 16	Otley
	Report

The Avenue
Attendance: 707
Referee: Daniel Woods

=== Round 5 ===
29 September 2018
15:00

(1 BP) Otley	28 – 25	Preston Grasshoppers (2 BP)
	Report

Cross Green
Attendance: 200
Referee: George Richardson

29 September 2018
14:30

(1 BP) Sedgley Park	58 – 17	Macclesfield
	Report

Park Lane
Attendance: 250
Referee: Michael Harris

29 September 2018
15:00

Chester	P – P	Tynedale

Hare Lane

- Postponed due to MRSA outbreak. Game to be replayed on 10 November 2018. (Note: The NCA decided to call off the Chester v Tynedale game on 29 September 2018 due an MRSA outbreak in the Tynedale team. This followed a Tynedale player suffering injuries in a game on 15 September, leading to a bacterial infection which led to the player and several of his team-mates being hospitalised.)

29 September 2018
15:00

(2 BP) Fylde	24 – 25	Sheffield Tigers
	Report

Woodlands Memorial Ground
Attendance: 497
Referee: Benjamin Davis

29 September 2018
15:00

Huddersfield	17 – 15	Leicester Lions (1 BP)
	Report

Lockwood Park
Attendance: 178
Referee: Louis Biggs

29 September 2018
15:00

Hull Ionians	20 – 12	Wharfedale
	Report

Brantingham Park
Attendance: 307
Referee: Timothy Allatt

29 September 2018
15:00

(1 BP) South Leicester	34 – 27	Peterborough Lions (2 BP)
	Report

Welford Road Ground
Attendance: 77
Referee: Daniel Woods

29 September 2018
15:00

Stourbridge	24 – 33	Hinckley (1 BP)
	Report

Stourton Park
Attendance: 310
Referee: Llyr ApGeraint-Roberts

=== Round 6 ===
6 October 2018
14:00

(1 BP) Leicester Lions	32 – 14	Sedgley Park
	Report

Westleigh Park
Attendance: 128
Referee: Daniel Woods

6 October 2018
15:00

(1 BP) Hinckley	42 – 17	South Leicester
	Report

De Montfort Park
Attendance: 580
Referee: Andrew Wigley

6 October 2018
15:00

(1 BP) Hull Ionians	34 – 21	Stourbridge
	Report

Brantingham Park
Attendance: 175
Referee: Harry Walbaum

6 October 2018
15:00

(1 BP) Macclesfield	31 – 22	Otley (1 BP)
	Report

Priory Park
Attendance: 205
Referee: Llyr ApGeraint-Roberts

6 October 2018
15:00

Peterborough Lions	17 – 10	Chester (1 BP)
	Report

Bretton Woods
Attendance: 110
Referee: Benjamin Wilde

6 October 2018
15:00

Sheffield Tigers	10 – 34	Huddersfield (1 BP)
	Report

Dore Moor
Attendance: 164
Referee: Ieuan Davies

6 October 2018
15:00

(1 BP) Tynedale	59 – 15	Fylde
	Report

Tynedale Park
Attendance: 480
Referee: Tim Allatt

6 October 2018
15:00

(1 BP) Wharfedale	39 – 22	Preston Grasshoppers (1 BP)
	Report

The Avenue
Attendance: 627
Referee: Michael Harris

=== Round 7 ===
13 October 2018
14:30

Otley	15 – 29	Leicester Lions (1 BP)
	Report

Cross Green
Attendance: 200
Referee: Timothy Allatt

13 October 2018
14:30

Preston Grasshoppers	19 – 11	Macclesfield
	Report

Lightfoot Green
Attendance: 442 (Note: The Rugby Paper give an attendance of 442 while Rugby Statbunker gives 243. In light of Preston's average attendances so far, the Rugby Paper figure seems the most likely.)
Referee: Alan Chandracahud

13 October 2018
14:30

(1 BP) Sedgley Park	37 – 29	Sheffield Tigers (1 BP)
	Report

Park Lane
Attendance: 150
Referee: George Richardson

13 October 2018
15:00

Chester	19 – 0	Hinckley
	Report

Hare Lane
Attendance: 362
Referee: Benjamin Davies

13 October 2018
15:00

(1 BP) Fylde	47 – 7	Peterborough Lions
	Report

Woodlands Memorial Ground
Attendance: 375
Referee: Nathan Howarth

13 October 2018
15:00

(1 BP) Huddersfield	24 – 21	Tynedale (1 BP)
	Report

Lockwood Park
Attendance: 266 (Note: The Rugby Paper give an attendance of 266 while Rugby Statbunker gives 400. On consultation with Huddersfield club officials it turns out the Rugby Paper attendance was correct.)
Referee: Owen Taylor

13 October 2018
15:00

South Leicester	12 – 24	Hull Ionians (1 BP)
	Report

Welford Road Ground
Attendance: 84
Referee: Jack Sutton

13 October 2018
15:00

(1 BP) Stourbridge	37 – 27	Wharfedale (1 BP)
	Report

Stourton Park
Attendance: 497 (Note: The Rugby Paper give an attendance of 497 while Rugby Statbunker gives 350. The Rugby Paper version is correct as the Stourbridge RFC match report for the games states that there are almost 500 in the ground, including 120 ex players.)
Referee: Luke Davies

=== Round 8 ===
20 October 2018
14:00

Leicester Lions	26 – 24	Preston Grasshoppers (2 BP)
	Report

Westleigh Park
Attendance: 138
Referee: Jack Le Feuvre

20 October 2018
15:00

Hinckley	16 – 5	Fylde
	Report

De Montfort Park
Attendance: 720
Referee: George Richardson

20 October 2018
15:00

(1 BP) Hull Ionians	25 – 24	Chester (1 BP)
	Report

Brantingham Park
Attendance: 181
Referee: Michael Harris

20 October 2018
15:00

Peterborough Lions	14 – 43	Huddersfield (1 BP)
	Report

Bretton Woods
Attendance: 180
Referee: Jack Sutton

20 October 2018
15:00

Sheffield Tigers	17 – 31	Otley (1 BP)
	Report

Dore Moor
Attendance: 152
Referee: Llyr ApGeraint-Roberts

20 October 2018
15:00

(1 BP) Stourbridge	57 – 45	South Leicester (1 BP)
	Report

Stourton Park
Attendance: 300
Referee: Benjamin Davis

20 October 2018
15:00

Tynedale	22 – 19	Sedgley Park (1 BP)
	Report

Tynedale Park
Attendance: 360
Referee: Alan Chandrachud

20 October 2018
15:00

(1 BP) Wharfedale	35 – 25	Macclesfield
	Report

The Avenue
Attendance: 592
Referee: Ben Rayner

=== Round 9 ===
27 October 2018
14:30

(1 BP) Otley	32 – 17	Tynedale
	Report

Cross Green
Attendance: 200
Referee: Ben Davis

27 October 2018
14:30

(1 BP) Preston Grasshoppers	38 – 33	Sheffield Tigers (2 BP)
	Report

Lightfoot Green
Attendance: 387 (Note: The Rugby Paper give an attendance of 387 while Rugby Statbunker gives 297. In light of Preston's average attendances so far, the Rugby Paper figure seems the most likely.)
Referee: Samuel Phillips

27 October 2018
14:30

(1 BP) Sedgley Park	31 – 29	Peterborough Lions (2 BP)
	Report

Park Lane
Attendance: 200
Referee: Owen Taylor

27 October 2018
15:00

(1 BP) Chester	27 – 22	Stourbridge (1 BP)
	Report

Hare Lane
Attendance: 328
Referee: James O'Brien

27 October 2018
15:00

(1 BP) Fylde	29 – 41	Hull Ionians (1 BP)
	Report

Woodlands Memorial Ground
Attendance: 438 (Note: The Rugby Paper give an attendance of 475 while Rugby Statbunker gives 438. As the Rugby Statbunker figure is more specific this has been used instead.)
Referee: Ben Rayner

27 October 2018
15:00

(1 BP) Huddersfield	43 – 8	Hinckley
	Report

Lockwood Park
Attendance: 324
Referee: Daniel Woods

27 October 2018
15:00

(1 BP) Macclesfield	35 – 24	Leicester Lions (1 BP)
	Report

Priory Park
Attendance: 287
Referee: Alan Chandrachud

27 October 2018
15:00

(1 BP) South Leicester	19 – 22	Wharfedale
	Report

Welford Road Ground
Attendance: 73
Referee: Andrew Wigley

=== Round 10 ===
3 November 2018
14:00

Hull Ionians	20 – 15	Huddersfield (1 BP)
	Report

Brantingham Park
Attendance: 247
Referee: Joe James

3 November 2018
14:00

(1 BP) Sheffield Tigers	54 – 7	Macclesfield
	Report

Dore Moor
Attendance: 143
Referee: Daniel Woods

3 November 2018
14:00

(1 BP) Tynedale	31 – 29	Preston Grasshoppers (2 BP)
	Report

Tynedale Park
Attendance: 450
Referee: Owen Taylor

3 November 2018
14:00

(1 BP) Wharfedale	34 – 30	Leicester Lions (2 BP)
	Report

The Avenue
Attendance: 439
Referee: James O'Brien

3 November 2018
14:15

Peterborough Lions	10 – 26	Otley (1 BP)
	Report

Bretton Woods
Attendance: 256 (Note: The Rugby Paper give an attendance of 256 while Rugby Statbunker gives 220. As the Rugby Paper figure is more precise, this has been used instead.)
Referee: Michael Harris

3 November 2018
14:15

South Leicester	0 – 27	Chester (1 BP)
	Report

Welford Road Ground
Attendance: 59
Referee: Ieuan Davies

3 November 2018
15:00

(1 BP) Hinckley	32 – 14	Sedgley Park
	Report

De Montfort Park
Attendance: 550
Referee: Ben Rayner

3 November 2018
15:00

Stourbridge	18 – 36	Fylde (1 BP)
	Report

Stourton Park
Attendance: 310
Referee: Adam Wookey

=== Round 5 (rescheduled game) ===
10 November 2018
15:00

(1 BP) Chester	33 – 22	Tynedale
	Report

Hare Lane
Attendance: 276
Referee: James O'Brien

- Game rescheduled from 29 September 2018.

=== Round 11 ===
17 November 2018
14:00

Leicester Lions	18 – 18	Sheffield Tigers
	Report

Westleigh Park
Attendance: 153
Referee: Luke Davies

17 November 2018
14:30

(1 BP) Otley	29 – 14	Hinckley
	Report

Cross Green
Attendance: 250
Referee: Ben Rayner

17 November 2018
14:30

(1 BP) Preston Grasshoppers	27 – 7	Peterborough Lions
	Report

Lightfoot Green
Attendance: 326
Referee: James O'Brien

17 November 2018
14:30

(2 BP) Sedgley Park	29 – 35	Hull Ionians (1 BP)
	Report

Park Lane
Attendance: 257
Referee: Tim Allatt

17 November 2018
15:00

(1 BP) Fylde	42 – 20	South Leicester
	Report

Woodlands Memorial Ground
Attendance: 531
Referee: Michael Harris

17 November 2018
15:00

Huddersfield	15 – 10	Stourbridge (1 BP)
	Report

Lockwood Park
Attendance: 196
Referee: Ben Davis

17 November 2018
15:00

Chester	28 – 25	Wharfedale (1 BP)
	Report

Hare Lane
Attendance: 379
Referee: Charlie Gayther

17 November 2018
15:00

Macclesfield	15 – 38	Tynedale (1 BP)
	Report

Priory Park
Attendance: 192
Referee: Ieuan Davies

=== Round 12 ===
24 November 2018
14:00

(1 BP) Hull Ionians	31 – 21	Otley
	Report

Brantingham Park
Attendance: 635
Referee: Ieuan Davies

24 November 2018
14:00

(1 BP) Tynedale	32 – 17	Leicester Lions
	Report

Tynedale Park
Attendance: 460
Referee: Michael Harris

24 November 2018
14:00

(1 BP) Wharfedale	26 – 35	Sheffield Tigers (1 BP)
	Report

The Avenue
Attendance: 598
Referee: Ben Davis

24 November 2018
14:15

Peterborough Lions	14 – 12	Macclesfield (1 BP)
	Report

Bretton Woods
Attendance: 150
Referee: Andrew Smith

24 November 2018
14:15

(1 BP) South Leicester	35 – 29	Huddersfield (2 BP)
	Report

Welford Road Ground
Attendance: 74
Referee: Llyr ApGeraint-Roberts

24 November 2018
15:00

Chester	7 – 16	Fylde
	Report

Hare Lane
Attendance: 368
Referee: George Richardson

24 November 2018
15:00

(1 BP) Hinckley	49 – 5	Preston Grasshoppers
	Report

De Montfort Park
Attendance: 545 (Note: The Rugby Paper give an attendance of 545 while Rugby Statbunker gives 454. From talking to Hinckley officials the 545 figure given in The Rugby Paper is correct.)
Referee: Tim Allatt

24 November 2018
15:00

(1 BP) Stourbridge	36 – 29	Sedgley Park (2 BP)
	Report

Stourton Park
Attendance: 295
Referee: Sam Phillips

=== Round 13 ===
1 December 2018
14:00

(1 BP) Leicester Lions	35 – 17	Peterborough Lions
	Report

Westleigh Park
Attendance: 149
Referee: Ieaun Davies

1 December 2018
14:00

(1 BP) Sheffield Tigers	11 – 17	Tynedale
	Report

Dore Moor
Attendance: 96
Referee: Michael Harris

1 December 2018
14:30

(1 BP) Otley	36 – 12	Stourbridge
	Report

Cross Green
Attendance: 250
Referee: George Richardson

1 December 2018
14:30

(1 BP) Preston Grasshoppers	29 – 7	Hull Ionians
	Report

Lightfoot Green
Attendance: 333
Referee: Ben Raynor

1 December 2018
14:30

(1 BP) Sedgley Park	43 – 24	South Leicester (1 BP)
	Report

Park Lane
Attendance: 150
Referee: Benjamin Davis

1 December 2018
15:00

Fylde	20 – 17	Wharfedale (1 BP)
	Report

Woodlands Memorial Ground
Attendance: 624
Referee: James O'Brien

1 December 2018
15:00

(1 BP) Huddersfield	15 – 21	Chester
	Report

Lockwood Park
Attendance: 237
Referee: Sam Phillips

1 December 2018
15:00

(1 BP) Macclesfield	33 – 21	Hinckley
	Report

Priory Park
Attendance: 187
Referee: Daniel Woods

=== Round 14 ===
8 December 2018
14:00

Hull Ionians	18 – 16	Macclesfield (1 BP)
	Report

Brantingham Park
Attendance: 208
Referee: Owen Taylor

8 December 2018
14:00

Wharfedale	18 – 3	Tynedale
	Report

The Avenue
Attendance: 402
Referee: Ben Rayner

8 December 2018
14:15

(1 BP) Peterborough Lions	28 – 27	Sheffield Tigers (2 BP)
	Report

Bretton Woods
Attendance: 150
Referee: Daniel Woods

8 December 2018
14:15

(1 BP) South Leicester	13 – 14	Otley
	Report

Welford Road Ground
Attendance: 64
Referee: Alan Chandrachud

8 December 2018
15:00

(1 BP) Chester	24 – 12	Sedgley Park
	Report

Hare Lane
Attendance: 383
Referee: Michael Harris

8 December 2018
15:00

Fylde	20 – 20	Huddersfield
	Report

Woodlands Memorial Ground
Attendance: 547
Referee: Ben Davis

8 December 2018
15:00

(1 BP) Hinckley	26 – 19	Leicester Lions (1 BP)
	Report

De Montfort Park
Attendance: 470
Referee: James O'Brien

8 December 2018
15:00

(2 BP) Stourbridge	32 – 38	Preston Grasshoppers (1 BP)
	Report

Stourton Park
Attendance: 290
Referee: Andrew Wigley

=== Round 15 ===
15 December 2018
14:00

Leicester Lions	17 – 0	Hull Ionians
	Report

Westleigh Park
Attendance: 142
Referee: Andrew MacNeaney

15 December 2018
14:00

Otley	6 – 0	Chester (1 BP)
	Report

Cross Green
Attendance: 350
Referee: Daniel Woods

15 December 2018
14:00

Sheffield Tigers	12 – 3	Hinckley
	Report

Dore Moor
Attendance: 97
Referee: Nathan Howarth

15 December 2018
14:00

Tynedale	P – P	Peterborough Lions

Tynedale Park

- Postponed due to adverse travel conditions caused by poor weather (snow). Game to be rescheduled for 23 February 2019.

15 December 2018
14:30

(1 BP) Preston Grasshoppers	25 – 0	South Leicester
	Report

Lightfoot Green
Attendance: 272
Referee: Michael Harris

15 December 2018
14:30

Sedgley Park	14 – 22	Fylde
	Report

Park Lane
Attendance: 259
Referee: George Richardson

15 December 2018
15:00

Huddersfield	P – P	Wharfedale

Lockwood Park

- Postponed due to poor weather (frozen pitch). Game to be rescheduled for 23 February 2019.

15 December 2018
15:00

Macclesfield	27 – 22	Stourbridge (1 BP)
	Report

Priory Park
Attendance: 200
Referee: Alan Chandrachud

=== Round 16 ===
22 December 2018
14:00

(1 BP) Hull Ionians	38 – 29	Tynedale (1 BP)
	Report

Brantingham Park
Attendance: 445
Referee: Jamie Leahy

22 December 2018
14:15

(1 BP) South Leicester	28 – 37	Leicester Lions (1 BP)
	Report

Welford Road Ground
Attendance: 112
Referee: Owen Taylor

22 December 2018
14:30

Sedgley Park	20 – 15	Wharfedale (1 BP)
	Report

Park Lane
Attendance: 439 (Note: The attendance figure given by The Rugby Paper for this game was 439 while Statbunker gave a figure of 250. Following discussion with Sedgley Park officials it turns out The Rugby Paper figure is correct.)
Referee: James O'Brien

22 December 2018
15:00

(1 BP) Chester	43 – 20	Macclesfield (1 BP)
	Report

Hare Lane
Attendance: 447
Referee: Ben Davis

22 December 2018
15:00

(1 BP) Fylde	33 – 17	Preston Grasshoppers
	Report

Woodlands Memorial Ground
Attendance: 1,794
Referee: Ben Rayner

22 December 2018
15:00

Hinckley	19 – 19	Peterborough Lions
	Report

De Montfort Park
Attendance: 740
Referee: Philip Davies

22 December 2018
15:00

Huddersfield	23 – 12	Otley
	Report

Lockwood Park
Attendance: 362 (Note: The attendance figure given by The Rugby Paper for this game was 362 while Statbunker gave a figure of 200. As this was a Christmas fixture the higher figure seems more likely and will be used until further findings can be revealed.)
Referee: Michael Harris

22 December 2018
15:00

(1 BP) Stourbridge	51 – 39	Sheffield Tigers (1 BP)
	Report

Stourton Park
Attendance: 400
Referee: Tim Allatt

=== Round 17 ===
5 January 2019
14:00

Leicester Lions	25 – 19	Chester (1 BP)
	Report

Westleigh Park
Attendance: 139
Referee: George Richardson

5 January 2019
14:00

(1 BP) Otley	28 – 26	Sedgley Park (1 BP)
	Report

Cross Green
Attendance: 250
Referee: Alan Chandrachud

5 January 2019
14:00

(1 BP) Sheffield Tigers	22 – 23	South Leicester
	Report

Dore Moor
Attendance: 135
Referee: Nikki O'Donnell

5 January 2019
14:00

(1 BP) Tynedale	40 – 24	Stourbridge (1 BP)
	Report

Tynedale Park
Attendance: 480
Referee: Ben Rayner

5 January 2019
14:00

Wharfedale	20 – 33	Hinckley (1 BP)
	Report

The Avenue
Attendance: 541
Referee: Owen Taylor

5 January 2019
14:15

Peterborough Lions	15 – 25	Hull Ionians
	Report

Bretton Woods
Attendance: 100
Referee: Samuel Phillips

5 January 2019
14:30

(1 BP) Preston Grasshoppers	22 – 27	Huddersfield
	Report

Lightfoot Green
Attendance: 297
Referee: Harry Walbaum

5 January 2019
15:00

(2 BP) Macclesfield	28 – 31	Fylde (1 BP)
	Report

Priory Park
Attendance: 306
Referee: Andrew Wigley

=== Round 18 ===
12 January 2019
14:00

(1 BP) Hull Ionians	31 – 27	Hinckley (1 BP)
	Report

Brantingham Park
Attendance: 224
Referee: Ben Rayner

12 January 2019
14:00

Otley	16 – 8	Wharfedale
	Report

Cross Green
Attendance: 630
Referee: George Richardson

12 January 2019
14:15

(1 BP) South Leicester	28 – 35	Tynedale (1 BP)
	Report

Welford Road Ground
Attendance: 56
Referee: Luke Davies

12 January 2019
14:30

Sedgley Park	15 – 3	Preston Grasshoppers
	Report

Park Lane
Attendance: 200
Referee: Michael Harris

12 January 2019
15:00

(1 BP) Chester	31 – 27	Sheffield Tigers (1 BP)
	Report

Hare Lane
Attendance: 330
Referee: Owen Taylor

12 January 2019
15:00

Fylde	14 – 13	Leicester Lions (1 BP)
	Report

Woodlands Memorial Ground
Attendance: 471
Referee: Benjamin Davis

12 January 2019
15:00

(1 BP) Huddersfield	37 – 19	Macclesfield
	Report

Lockwood Park
Attendance: 231
Referee: Ieuan Davies

12 January 2019
15:00

(1 BP) Stourbridge	52 – 34	Peterborough Lions (1 BP)
	Report

Stourton Park
Attendance: 295
Referee: Nikki O'Donnell

=== Round 19 ===
19 January 2019
14:00

(2 BP) Leicester Lions	23 – 28	Huddersfield (1 BP)
	Report

Westleigh Park
Attendance: 133
Referee: Owen Taylor

19 January 2019
14:00

Sheffield Tigers	17 – 12	Fylde (1 BP)
	Report

Dore Moor
Attendance: 127
Referee: Ieuan Davies

19 January 2019
14:00

(1 BP) Tynedale	35 – 5	Chester
	Report

Tynedale Park
Attendance: 860
Referee: Michael Harris

19 January 2019
14:00

(1 BP) Wharfedale	24 – 12	Hull Ionians
	Report

The Avenue
Attendance: 511
Referee: Tim Allatt

19 January 2019
14:15

Peterborough Lions	21 – 18	South Leicester (1 BP)
	Report

Bretton Woods
Attendance: 100
Referee: Daniel Woods

19 January 2019
14:30

Preston Grasshoppers	25 – 10	Otley
	Report

Lightfoot Green
Attendance: 413
Referee: James O'Brien

19 January 2019
14:00

Hinckley	15 – 7	Stourbridge
	Report

De Montfort Park
Attendance: 710
Referee: Andrew MacNeaney

19 January 2019
15:00

(2 BP) Macclesfield	24 – 26	Sedgley Park (1 BP)
	Report

Priory Park
Attendance: 237
Referee: Ben Rayner

=== Round 20 ===
26 January 2019
14:15

(1 BP) South Leicester	30 – 25	Hinckley (1 BP)
	Report

Welford Road Ground
Attendance: 74
Referee: Ieuan Davies

26 January 2019
14:30

(1 BP) Preston Grasshoppers	14 – 15	Wharfedale
	Report

Lightfoot Green
Attendance: 472
Referee: Josh Burridge

26 January 2019
14:30

(1 BP) Otley	48 – 26	Macclesfield (1 BP)
	Report

Cross Green
Attendance: 200
Referee: Llyr ApGeraint-Roberts

26 January 2019
14:30

(1 BP) Sedgley Park	19 – 20	Leicester Lions
	Report

Park Lane
Attendance: 175
Referee: James O'Brien

26 January 2019
15:00

(1 BP) Chester	24 – 5	Peterborough Lions
	Report

Hare Lane
Attendance: 341
Referee: Benjamin Davis

26 January 2019
15:00

(1 BP) Fylde	31 – 5	Tynedale
	Report

Woodlands Memorial Ground
Attendance: 423
Referee: Tim Allatt

26 January 2019
15:00

(1 BP) Huddersfield	33 – 17	Sheffield Tigers
	Report

Lockwood Park
Attendance: 552
Referee: Michael Harris

26 January 2019
15:00

Stourbridge	7 – 3	Hull Ionians (1 BP)
	Report

Stourton Park
Attendance: 325
Referee: Nigel Davies

=== Round 21 ===
2 February 2019
14:00

Hull Ionians	P – P	South Leicester

Brantingham Park

- Postponed due to poor weather (frozen pitch). Game to be rescheduled for 23 February 2019.

2 February 2019
14:00

Leicester Lions	14 – 30	Otley (1 BP)
	Report

Westleigh Park
Attendance: 127
Referee: Alan Chandrachud

2 February 2019
14:00

Sheffield Tigers	P – P	Sedgley Park

Dore Moor

- Postponed due to poor weather (frozen pitch). Game to be rescheduled for 23 February 2019.

2 February 2019
14:00

Tynedale	P – P	Huddersfield

Tynedale Park

- Postponed due to poor weather (frozen pitch). Game to be rescheduled for 16 March 2019.

2 February 2019
14:00

Wharfedale	P – P	Stourbridge

The Avenue

- Postponed due to poor weather (frozen pitch). Game to be rescheduled for 16 March 2019.

2 February 2019
14:15

Peterborough Lions	7 – 38	Fylde (1 BP)
	Report

Bretton Woods
Attendance: 100
Referee: Owen Taylor

2 February 2019
15:00

Hinckley	P – P	Chester

De Montfort Park

- Postponed due to poor weather (frozen pitch). Game to be rescheduled for 23 February 2019.

2 February 2019
15:00

Macclesfield	P – P	Preston Grasshoppers

Priory Park

- Postponed due to poor weather (snow). Game to be rescheduled for 23 February 2019.

=== Round 22 ===
9 February 2019
14:15

South Leicester	19 – 34	Stourbridge (1 BP)
	Report

Welford Road Ground
Attendance: 300
Referee: Adam Wookey

9 February 2019
14:30

Otley	20 – 14	Sheffield Tigers (1 BP)
	Report

Cross Green
Attendance: 259
Referee: Timothy Allatt

9 February 2019
14:30

(1 BP) Preston Grasshoppers	29 – 0	Leicester Lions
	Report

Lightfoot Green
Attendance: 297
Referee: Jack Le Feuvre

9 February 2019
14:30

(1 BP) Sedgley Park	28 – 46	Tynedale (1 BP)
	Report

Park Lane
Attendance: 200
Referee: Ieuan Davies

9 February 2019
15:00

(1 BP) Chester	26 – 20	Hull Ionians (1 BP)
	Report

Hare Lane
Attendance: 380
Referee: Alexander Thomas

9 February 2019
15:00

Fylde	21 – 8	Hinckley
	Report

Woodlands Memorial Ground
Attendance: 453
Referee: Llyr ApGeraint-Roberts

9 February 2019
15:00

(1 BP) Huddersfield	38 – 17	Peterborough Lions
	Report

Lockwood Park
Attendance: 197
Referee: Alan Chandrachud

9 February 2019
15:00

Macclesfield	13 – 34	Wharfedale (1 BP)
	Report

Priory Park
Attendance: 201
Referee: Andrew Wigley

=== Round 23 ===
16 February 2019
14:00

(1 BP) Hull Ionians	34 – 22	Fylde
	Report

Brantingham Park
Attendance: 256
Referee: Alan Chandrachud

16 February 2019
14:00

Leicester Lions	24 – 19	Macclesfield (1 BP)
	Report

Westleigh Park
Attendance: 109
Referee: Benjamin Wilde

16 February 2019
14:00

(2 BP) Sheffield Tigers	24 – 27	Preston Grasshoppers (1 BP)
	Report

Dore Moor
Attendance: 137
Referee: George Richardson

16 February 2019
14:00

(1 BP) Tynedale	25 – 22	Otley (1 BP)
	Report

Tynedale Park
Attendance: 650
Referee: Benjamin Davis

16 February 2019
14:00

(1 BP) Wharfedale	44 – 20	South Leicester
	Report

The Avenue
Attendance: 526
Referee: Daniel Harris

16 February 2019
14:15

Peterborough Lions	19 – 33	Sedgley Park (1 BP)
	Report

Bretton Woods
Attendance: 100
Referee: Jack Le Feurve

16 February 2019
15:00

(2 BP) Hinckley	24 – 27	Huddersfield
	Report

De Montfort Park
Attendance: 570
Referee: Daniel Woods

16 February 2019
15:00

(1 BP) Stourbridge	26 – 26	Chester (1 BP)
	Report

Stourton Park
Attendance: 300
Referee: Phillip Davies

=== Rounds 15 & 21 (rescheduled games) ===
23 February 2019
14:00

(1 BP) Hull Ionians	59 – 10	South Leicester
	Report

Brantingham Park
Attendance: 173
Referee: Benjamin Davis

- Game rescheduled from 2 February 2019.

23 February 2019
14:00

Sheffield Tigers	3 – 49	Sedgley Park (1 BP)
	Report

Dore Moor
Attendance: 88
Referee: Daniel Woods

- Game rescheduled from 2 February 2019.

23 February 2019
14:00

(1 BP) Tynedale	31 – 5	Peterborough Lions
	Report

Tynedale Park
Attendance: 380
Referee: Chris Bloomfield

- Game rescheduled from 15 December 2018.

23 February 2019
14:30

Macclesfield	14 – 50	Preston Grasshoppers (1 BP)
	Report

Priory Park
Attendance: 251
Referee: James O'Neill

- Game rescheduled from 2 February 2019.

23 February 2019
15:00

(1 BP) Hinckley	35 – 7	Chester
	Report

De Montfort Park
Attendance: 450
Referee: Andrew MacNeaney

- Game rescheduled from 2 February 2019.

23 February 2019
15:00

(1 BP) Huddersfield	13 – 20	Wharfedale
	Report

Lockwood Park
Attendance: 417
Referee: Tim Allatt

- Game rescheduled from 15 December 2018.

=== Round 24 ===
2 March 2019
14:00

(1 BP) Leicester Lions	37 – 10	Wharfedale
	Report

Westleigh Park
Attendance: 129
Referee: Andrew MacNeaney

2 March 2019
14:30

(1 BP) Otley	35 – 5	Peterborough Lions
	Report

Cross Green
Attendance: 200
Referee: Jack LeFeuvre

2 March 2019
14:30

Preston Grasshoppers	21 – 5	Tynedale
	Report

Lightfoot Green
Attendance: 381
Referee: Ieuan Davies

2 March 2019
14:30

(1 BP) Sedgley Park	31 – 10	Hinckley
	Report

Park Lane
Attendance: 250
Referee: Benjamin Davos

2 March 2019
15:00

(1 BP) Chester	59 – 12	South Leicester
	Report

Hare Lane
Attendance: 337
Referee: Timothy Allatt

2 March 2019
15:00

(1 BP) Fylde	54 – 10	Stourbridge
	Report

Woodlands Memorial Ground
Attendance: 457
Referee: Daniel Woods

2 March 2019
15:00

Huddersfield	19 – 27	Hull Ionians (1 BP)
	Report

Lockwood Park
Attendance: 527 (Note: The attendance figure given by The Rugby Paper for this game was 527 while Statbunker gave a figure of 315. As this was a Yorkshire derby between two clubs challenging for the league the higher figure seems more likely and will be used until further findings can be revealed.)
Referee: Andrew Wigley

2 March 2019
15:00

(1 BP) Macclesfield	31 – 17	Sheffield Tigers
	Report

Priory Park
Attendance: 258
Referee: Owen Taylor

=== Round 25 ===
9 March 2019
14:00

(1 BP) Tynedale	33 – 12	Macclesfield
	Report

Tynedale Park
Attendance: 360
Referee: Daniel Woods

9 March 2019
15:00

Hinckley	12 – 25	Otley (1 BP)
	Report

De Montfort Park
Attendance: 520
Referee: Ieuan Davies

9 March 2019
15:00

(1 BP) Hull Ionians	27 – 34	Sedgley Park (1 BP)
	Report

Brantingham Park
Attendance: 214
Referee: Llyr ApGeraint-Roberts

9 March 2019
15:00

(1 BP) Peterborough Lions	12 – 19	Preston Grasshoppers
	Report

Bretton Woods
Attendance: 100
Referee: Michael Harris

- Peterborough Lions are relegated.

9 March 2019
15:00

Sheffield Tigers	21 – 18	Leicester Lions (1 BP)
	Report

Dore Moor
Attendance: 106
Referee: Tim Allatt

9 March 2019
15:00

South Leicester	12 – 59	Fylde (1 BP)
	Report

Welford Road Ground
Attendance: 49
Referee: Ben Davis

9 March 2019
15:00

(1 BP) Stourbridge	58 – 22	Huddersfield
	Report

Stourton Park
Attendance: 295
Referee: James O'Brien

9 March 2019
15:00

Wharfedale	5 – 24	Chester (1 BP)
	Report

The Avenue
Attendance: 425
Referee: Harry Walbaum

=== Round 21 (rescheduled games) ===
16 March 2019
14:00

(1 BP) Tynedale	14 – 15	Huddersfield
	Report

Tynedale Park
Attendance: 203
Referee: Benjamin Davis

- Game rescheduled from 2 February 2019.

16 March 2019
14:00

Wharfedale	P – P	Stourbridge

The Avenue

- Game originally rescheduled from 2 February 2019 but postponed (again) to 20 April 2019 due to a waterlogged pitch caused by heavy rain.

=== Round 26 ===
23 March 2019
14:00

(2 BP) Leicester Lions	26 – 27	Tynedale (1 BP)
	Report

Westleigh Park
Attendance: 450
Referee: Llyr ApGeraint-Roberts

23 March 2019
14:30

(2 BP) Otley	24 – 29	Hull Ionians (1 BP)
	Report

Cross Green
Attendance: 400
Referee: Benjamin Davis

23 March 2019
14:30

(1 BP) Preston Grasshoppers	48 – 19	Hinckley
	Report

Lightfoot Green
Attendance: 425
Referee: James O'Brien

23 March 2019
14:30

(1 BP) Sedgley Park	42 – 7	Stourbridge
	Report

Park Lane
Attendance: 250
Referee: Michael Harris

23 March 2019
15:00

Fylde	19 – 27	Chester (1 BP)
	Report

Woodlands Memorial Ground
Attendance: 452
Referee: Tim Allatt

23 March 2019
15:00

(1 BP) Huddersfield	91 – 24	South Leicester (1 BP)
	Report

Lockwood Park
Attendance: 242 (Note: The attendance figure given by The Rugby Paper for this game was 242 while Statbunker gave a figure of 250. As the Rugby Statbunker figure seems a rounded estimate, The Rugby Paper figure will be used instead.)
Referee: Ieuan Davies

23 March 2019
15:00

(1 BP) Macclesfield	45 – 31	Peterborough Lions (1 BP)
	Report

Priory Park
Attendance: 201
Referee: Carl Adams

23 March 2019
15:00

(1 BP) Sheffield Tigers	20 – 22	Wharfedale
	Report

Dore Moor
Attendance: 215
Referee: Luke Davies

=== Round 27 ===
30 March 2019
15:00

(1 BP) Chester	57 – 10	Huddersfield
	Report

Hare Lane
Attendance: 430
Referee: Llyr ApGeraint-Roberts

30 March 2019
15:00

Hinckley	24 – 22	Macclesfield (1 BP)
	Report

De Montfort Park
Attendance: 650
Referee: Ben Davis

30 March 2019
15:00

Hull Ionians	22 – 15	Preston Grasshoppers (1 BP)
	Report

Brantingham Park
Attendance: 485
Referee: Nick Wood

30 March 2019
15:00

(1 BP) Peterborough Lions	29 – 52	Leicester Lions (1 BP)
	Report

Bretton Woods
Attendance: 110
Referee: Alan Chandrachud

30 March 2019
15:00

South Leicester	10 – 42	Sedgley Park (1 BP)
	Report

Welford Road Ground
Attendance: 37
Referee: Owen Taylor

30 March 2019
15:00

(1 BP) Stourbridge	60 – 17	Otley
	Report

Stourton Park
Attendance: 350
Referee: David Charlton

30 March 2019
15:00

(1 BP) Tynedale	36 – 19	Sheffield Tigers
	Report

Tynedale Park
Attendance: 480
Referee: Michael Harris

30 March 2019
15:00

Wharfedale	14 – 13	Fylde (1 BP)
	Report

The Avenue
Attendance: 780
Referee: Philip Davies

=== Round 28 ===
6 April 2019
14:00

Leicester Lions	14 – 10	Hinckley (1 BP)
	Report

Westleigh Park
Attendance: 247
Referee: Adam Wookey

6 April 2019
14:30

(2 BP) Otley	38 – 41	South Leicester (1 BP)
	Report

Cross Green
Attendance: 250
Referee: George Richardson

- South Leicester are relegated.

6 April 2019
14:30

(1 BP) Preston Grasshoppers	40 – 34	Stourbridge (2 BP)
	Report

Lightfoot Green
Attendance: 427
Referee: Andrew MacNeaney

6 April 2019
14:30

(1 BP) Sedgley Park	45 – 7	Chester
	Report

Park Lane
Attendance: 350
Referee: Ieuan Davies

6 April 2019
15:00

(1 BP) Huddersfield	45 – 33	Fylde (1 BP)
	Report

Lockwood Park
Attendance: 471
Referee: Owen Taylor

6 April 2019
15:00

(1 BP) Macclesfield	26 – 47	Hull Ionians (1 BP)
	Report

Priory Park
Attendance: 281
Referee: Ben Rayner

- Macclesfield are relegated.

6 April 2019
15:00

(1 BP) Sheffield Tigers	53 – 19	Peterborough Lions
	Report

Dore Moor
Attendance: 105
Referee: David Charlton

6 April 2019
15:00

(1 BP) Tynedale	27 – 21	Wharfedale (1 BP)
	Report

Tynedale Park
Attendance: 650 (Note: The attendance figure given by The Rugby Paper for this game was 650 while Statbunker gave a figure of just 300. From talking to Tynedale officials, it turns out that The Rugby Paper version was correct.)
Referee: Daniel Woods

=== Round 29 ===
13 April 2019
15:00

(1 BP) Chester	31 – 0	Otley

Hare Lane
Attendance: 432
Referee: Harry Walbaum

- Chester qualify for promotion play-off.

13 April 2019
15:00

Fylde	12 – 28	Sedgley Park (1 BP)

Woodlands Memorial Ground
Attendance: 930
Referee: George Richardson

13 April 2019
15:00

(1 BP) Hinckley	37 – 34	Sheffield Tigers (2 BP)

De Montfort Park
Attendance: 695
Referee: Ieuan Davies

13 April 2019
15:00

(1 BP) Hull Ionians	48 – 30	Leicester Lions (1 BP)

Brantingham Park
Attendance: 355
Referee: Alan Chandrachud

- Hull Ionians are champions.

13 April 2019
15:00

(1 BP) Peterborough Lions	35 – 68	Tynedale (1 BP)

Bretton Woods
Attendance: 140
Referee: Ben Rayner

13 April 2019
15:00

(1 BP) South Leicester	34 – 51	Preston Grasshoppers (1 BP)

Welford Road Ground
Attendance: 51
Referee: Andrew Wigley

13 April 2019
15:00

(1 BP) Stourbridge	48 – 22	Macclesfield (1 BP)

Stourton Park
Attendance: 435
Referee: Jack le Fauvre

13 April 2019
15:00

(1 BP) Wharfedale	12 – 17	Huddersfield

The Avenue
Attendance: 773
Referee: Ben Russell

=== Round 21 (rescheduled game) ===
20 April 2019
15:00

(1 BP) Wharfedale	38 – 24	Stourbridge (1 BP)

The Avenue
Attendance: 413
Referee: Alan Chandrachud

- Game originally rescheduled from 2 February 2019 and then again from 16 March 2019.

=== Round 30 ===
27 April 2019
15:00

Leicester Lions	22 – 17	Stourbridge (1 BP)

Westleigh Park
Attendance: 175
Referee: Owen Taylor

27 April 2019
15:00

(1 BP) Macclesfield	24 – 10	South Leicester

Priory Park
Attendance: 301
Referee: Carl Adams

27 April 2019
15:00

Otley	3 – 14	Fylde

Cross Green
Attendance: 250
Referee: Jack LeFeuvre

27 April 2019
15:00

(1 BP) Preston Grasshoppers	21 – 22	Chester (1 BP)

Lightfoot Green
Attendance: 432
Referee: Elliot Lewis

27 April 2019
15:00

Sedgley Park	22 – 17	Huddersfield (1 BP)

Park Lane
Attendance: 200
Referee: Daniel Woods

27 April 2019
15:00

(1 BP) Sheffield Tigers	14 – 17	Hull Ionians

Dore Moor
Attendance: 214
Referee: Llyr ApGeraint-Roberts

27 April 2019
15:00

(1 BP) Tynedale	24 – 24	Hinckley (1 BP)

Tynedale Park
Attendance: 650
Referee: Michael Harris

27 April 2019
15:00

(1 BP) Wharfedale	29 – 0	Peterborough Lions

The Avenue
Attendance: 389
Referee: David Charlton

== Promotion play-off ==
Each season, the runners-up in the National League 2 North and National League 2 South participate in a play-off for promotion to National League 1. Canterbury were runners up in the 2018–19 National League 2 South, and because they had a better record than the 2018–19 National League 2 North runners up, Chester, they host the play-off match.

Team	Pld	W	D	L	PF	PA	PD	TB	LB	Pts
Canterbury (P)	30	24	0	6	894	564	+330	21	4	121
Chester	30	21	1	8	748	542	+206	19	4	109

(P) Promoted

4 May 2019
15:00

Canterbury	19 – 10	Chester

The Marine Travel Ground
Attendance: 1,114
Referee: Charles Gayther

== Attendances ==
- Does not include promotion play-off.

Club	Home games	Total	Average	Highest	Lowest	% Capacity
Chester	15	5,540	369	447	276	18%
Fylde	15	9,156	610	1,794	375	8%
Hinckley	15	8,599	573	740	385	29%
Huddersfield	15	4,728	315	552	178	21%
Hull Ionians	15	4,360	291	635	163	19%
Leicester Lions	15	2,641	176	450	109	9%
Macclesfield	15	3,473	232	306	172	19%
Otley	15	4,139	276	630	200	4%
Peterborough Lions	15	2,313	154	410	100	
Preston Grasshoppers	15	6,354	424	1,023	272	19%
Sedgley Park	15	3,570	238	439	150	8%
Sheffield Tigers	15	2,078	139	215	88	14%
South Leicester	15	1,280	85	300	37	
Stourbridge	15	4,967	331	497	265	9%
Tynedale	15	7,393	493	860	203	25%
Wharfedale	15	8,279	552	780	389	28%

== Individual statistics ==
- Note that points scorers includes tries as well as conversions, penalties and drop goals. Appearance figures also include coming on as substitutes (unused substitutes not included). Does not include promotion play-off.

=== Top points scorers ===
Rank	Player	Team	Appearances	Points
1	(England) Lewis Minikin	Hull Ionians	30	315
2	(England) Gregory Smith	Fylde	29	258
3	(England) Joe Wilson	Hinckley	30	240
4	(England) Thomas Davidson	Preston Grasshoppers	29	229
5	(England) Chris Johnson	Huddersfield	20	222
6	(England) Stephen Collins	Sedgley Park	22	204
7	(England) Jack Blakeney-Edwards	Wharfedale	25	181
8	(England) Mark Ireland	Sheffield Tigers	22	166
9	(England) Ben Palmer	South Leicester	18	158
10	(England) Thomas Morton	Macclesfield	29	156

=== Top try scorers ===
Rank	Player	Team	Appearances	Tries
1	(England) Morgan Passman	Tynedale	19	31
2	(England) David Rundle	Stourbridge	30	26
3	(England) Thomas Carleton	Fylde	30	24
4	(England) Jamie Broadley	Sheffield Tigers	29	22
4	(England) Matt Riley	Sedgley Park	30	22
5	(England) Devon Constant	Leicester Lions	30	21
6	(England) Henri Packard	Sheffield Tigers	29	20
6	(England) Lewis Minikin	Hull Ionians	30	20
7	(England) Andrew Riley	Sedgley Park	29	19
8	(England) Callum Dacey	Hinckley	21	18
8	(England) Alex Wilcockson	Leicester Lions	24	18

== Season records ==
=== Team ===
Largest home win — 67 points

91 – 24 Huddersfield at home to South Leicester on 23 March 2019

Largest away win — 47 points

59 – 12 Fylde away to South Leicester on 9 March 2019

Most points scored — 91 points

91 – 24 Huddersfield at home to South Leicester on 23 March 2019

Most tries in a match — 13

Huddersfield at home to South Leicester on 23 March 2019

Most conversions in a match — 13

Huddersfield at home to South Leicester on 23 March 2019

Most penalties in a match — 6

Sheffield Tigers away to Fylde on 29 September 2018

Most drop goals in a match — 1 (8)

Hull Ionians at home to Peterborough Lions on 15 September 2018
Hull Ionians at home to Macclesfield on 8 December 2018
Huddersfield away to Preston Grasshoppers on 5 January 2019
Huddersfield away to Hinckley on 16 February 2019
Huddersfield at home to Wharfedale on 23 February 2019
Preston Grasshoppers at home to Tynedale on 2 March 2019
Stourbridge away to Preston Grasshoppers on 6 April 2019
Huddersfield away to Sedgley Park on 27 April 2019

=== Attendances ===
Highest — 1,794

Fylde at home to Preston Grasshoppers on 22 December 2018

Lowest — 37

South Leicester at home to Sedgley Park on 30 March 2019

Highest average attendance — 610

Fylde

Lowest average attendance — 85

South Leicester

=== Player ===
Most points in a match — 36

(England) Chris Johnson for Huddersfield at home to South Leicester on 23 March 2019

Most tries in a match — 4 (6)

(England) Jamie Broadley for Sheffield Tigers at home to Macclesfield on 3 November 2018
(England) Callum Dacey for Hinckley at home to Chester on 23 February 2019
(England) David Rundle for Stourbridge at home to Huddersfield on 9 March 2019
(England) Myles Hall for Macclesfield at home to Peterborough Lions on 23 March 2019
(England) Kian Stewart for Huddersfield at home to South Leicester on 23 March 2019
(England) Henri Packard for Sheffield Tigers at home to Peterborough Lions on 6 April 2019

Most conversions in a match — 13

(England) Chris Johnson for Huddersfield at home to South Leicester on 23 March 2019

Most penalties in a match — 6

(England) Mark Ireland for Sheffield Tigers away to Fylde on 29 September 2018

Most drop goals in a match — 1 (8)

(England) Sam Crane for Hull Ionians at home to Peterborough Lions on 15 September 2018
(England) Morgan Bunting for Hull Ionians at home to Macclesfield on 8 December 2018
(England) Chris Johnson for Huddersfield away to Preston Grasshoppers on 5 January 2019
(England) Chris Johnson for Huddersfield away to Hinckley on 16 February 2019
(England) Chris Johnson for Huddersfield at home to Wharfedale on 23 February 2019
(England) Thomas Davidson for Preston Grasshoppers at home to Tynedale on 2 March 2019
(England) Chris Scott for Stourbridge away to Preston Grasshoppers on 6 April 2019
(England) Chris Johnson for Huddersfield away to Sedgley Park on 27 April 2019

== See also ==
- English rugby union system
- Rugby union in England
