= 2015–16 National League 2 North =

Rugby union competition in England

- Countries: England
- Date: 5 September 2015 – 14 May 2016
- Champions: Macclesfield (3rd title)
- Runners-up: Sedgley Park
- Relegated: Huddersfield, Broadstreet, Sandal
- Matches played: 239
- Attendance: 65,338 (average 273 per match)
- Highest attendance: 1,050; Harrogate v Otley; 5 September 2015
- Lowest attendance: 50; South Leicester v Sedgley Park; 12 September 2015; South Leicester v Caldy; 10 October 2015
- Top point scorer: (England) Lewis Minikin (Harrogate); 299 points
- Top try scorer: (England) Nick Royle (Caldy); 25 tries

The 2015–16 National League 2 North is the seventh season (29th overall) of the fourth tier of the English domestic rugby union competitions since the professionalised format of the second division was introduced. There was talk of this being the last season in this format due to RFU changes to tier four which were supposed to result in a restructuring of the league from two regional divisions (north and south) to three (north, south-east and south-west) for the 2016–17 season but this seems to have been put on hold due to protests from the northern clubs who stood to lose revenue from a smaller fixture list.

Teams joining the division include Macclesfield and Tynedale (both relegated from National League 1), Sale and Sandal (both promoted from National League 3 North) and South Leicester (promoted from National League 3 Midlands). A further change this season saw Harrogate play their first game at their new ground at Rudding Lane – a move from their previous ground of Claro Road where they had been stationed for the past 119 years – beating local rivals Otley in front of a club record crowd of 1,050.

At the end of the season, Macclesfield made an instant return to National League 1 after their relegation the previous season by winning the championship with three games to go, defeating Chester 40-12 to take the title at Priory Park – the club's third National League 2 North title and a record so far in the division. The two bottom clubs at the end of the season were Huddersfield, who went down in Round 27, and Broadstreet, who followed one week later. While both teams were fairly competitive (gaining 7 and 8 wins apiece) the third relegation spot was much more keenly fought with five teams facing the drop up on the last round of the season. In the end it was Sandal who went down after one season spent in National League 2 North, losing their final game against Luctonians, while their relegation rivals all won. It was a particularly interesting contest between Sandal and fellow promoted club, Sale, who were actually in the final relegation spot on the last day (although they did have a rescheduled game still to play) but the Heywood Road side won against high flying Caldy to stay in the division. Another interesting feature of the season was Caldy's Nick Royle whose 25 tries saw him finish not only as the top try scorer in the league but also as the record all-time try scorer in the division with 161 tries overall.

As league runners up to Macclesfield by some distance, Sedgley Park had to travel down to Hertfordshire to face the 2015–16 National League 2 South runners up, Old Albanian, who hosted the game due to a superior league record. In the end Old Albanian were too good for Sedgley Park, winning 24 – 0 to claim the final promotion place to the 2016–17 National League 1.

== Structure ==
The league consists of sixteen teams with all the teams playing each other on a home and away basis to make a total of thirty matches each. There is one automatic promotion place, one play-off place and three relegation places. The champions are promoted to the 2016–17 National League 1 and the runners-up play the second-placed team in the 2015–16 National League 2 South with the winner being promoted. The last three teams are relegated to either National League 3 Midlands or National League 3 North depending on the geographical location of the team.

== Participating teams and locations ==
Eleven of the teams listed below participated in the 2014–15 National League 2 North season; Macclesfield and Tynedale were relegated from the 2014–15 National League 1, Sale (champions) and Sandal (play-offs) were promoted from National League 3 North while South Leicester (champions) were promoted from National League 3 Midlands.

Locations of the 2015–16 National League 2 North teams

Team	Stadium	Capacity	City/Area	Previous Season
Broadstreet	Ivor Preece Field	1,500 (250 seats)	Coventry, West Midlands	7th
Caldy	Paton Field	4,000	Thurstaston, Wirral, Merseyside	6th
Chester	Hare Lane	2,000 (500 seats)	Chester, Cheshire	5th
Harrogate	Rudding Lane (Note: Harrogate moved to Rudding Lane for the 2015–16 season having previously been based at Claro Road.)	2,000	Harrogate, North Yorkshire	4th
Huddersfield	Lockwood Park	1,500 (500 seats)	Huddersfield, West Yorkshire	9th
Leicester Lions	Westleigh Park	2,000	Blaby, Leicestershire	11th
Luctonians	Mortimer Park	2,500 (300 seats)	Kingsland, Herefordshire	13th
Macclesfield	Priory Park	1,250 (250 seats)	Macclesfield, Cheshire	Relegated from National League 1 (16th)
Otley	Cross Green	7,000 (852 seats)	Otley, Leeds, West Yorkshire	8th
Preston Grasshoppers	Lightfoot Green	2,250 (250 seats)	Preston, Lancashire	12th
Sale	Heywood Road	5,400	Sale, Greater Manchester	Promoted from National League 3 North (1st)
Sandal	Milnthorpe Green		Sandal Magna, Wakefield, West Yorkshire	Promoted from National League 3 North via the play-off
Sedgley Park	Park Lane	3,000	Whitefield, Bury, Greater Manchester	3rd
South Leicester	Welford Road Ground		Leicester, Leicestershire	Promoted from National League 3 Midlands (1st)
Stourbridge	Stourton Park	3,500 (499 seats)	Stourbridge, West Midlands	10th
Tynedale	Tynedale Park; Kingston Park (Note: Due to stormy weather conditions during the winter that damaged their clubhouse and waterlogged their pitch, during the second half of the season Tynedale would play all their 'home games' at Kingston Park, home of Newcastle Falcons.)	2,000 (400 seats); 10,200	Corbridge, Northumberland; Newcastle upon Tyne, Tyne and Wear	Relegated from National League 1 (15th)

== League table ==
2015–16 National League 2 North table
Pos	Team	Pld	W	D	L	PF	PA	PD	TB	LB	Pts	Qualification
1	Macclesfield (C)	29	25	0	4	907	507	+400	22	1	123 (Note: Macclesfield's final (rescheduled) game at home to Harrogate was cancelled as it was a 'dead rubber' and would not adversely affect the final league standings.)	Promotion place
2	Sedgley Park	30	21	0	9	951	562	+389	18	6	108	Play-off place
3	Leicester Lions	30	19	1	10	595	485	+110	7	5	90	
4	Stourbridge	30	18	1	11	626	530	+96	8	7	89	
5	Caldy	30	17	2	11	642	547	+95	8	7	87	
6	Luctonians	30	15	2	13	661	714	−53	11	4	79	
7	Harrogate	29	16	0	13	612	605	+7	7	6	77 (Note: Harrogate's final (rescheduled) game away to Macclesfield was cancelled as it was a 'dead rubber' and would not adversely affect the final league standings.)	
8	Otley	30	14	0	16	584	644	−60	9	8	73	
9	Preston Grasshoppers	30	12	3	15	591	627	−36	7	7	68	
10	Tynedale	30	12	1	17	659	746	−87	10	8	68	
11	Chester	30	12	0	18	599	662	−63	9	9	66	
12	South Leicester	30	11	3	16	659	732	−73	11	5	66	
13	Sale	30	12	2	16	617	738	−121	7	6	65	
14	Sandal (R)	30	12	1	17	506	666	−160	3	7	60	Relegation place
15	Broadstreet (R)	30	8	0	22	554	736	−182	4	9	45	Relegation place
16	Huddersfield (R)	30	7	0	23	509	771	−262	3	7	38	Relegation place

Updated to match(es) played on 7 May 2016. Source: "National League 2 North". NCA Rugby.
Rules for classification: If teams are level at any stage, tiebreakers are applied in the following order:
1. Number of matches won
2. Difference between points for and against
3. Total number of points for
4. Aggregate number of points scored in matches between tied teams
5. Number of matches won excluding the first match, then the second and so on until the tie is settled
  Notes:

== Fixtures ==
=== Round 1 ===
5 September 2015
15:00

Chester	19 – 15	Preston Grasshoppers (BP)
	Report

Hare Lane
Attendance: 378
Referee: Chris Bennett

5 September 2015
15:00

Harrogate	15 – 10	Otley (BP)
	Report

Rudding Lane
Attendance: 1,050
Referee: William Halford

5 September 2015
15:00

Huddersfield	24 – 17	South Leicester (BP)
	Report

Lockwood Park
Attendance: 148
Referee: Mike Hudson

5 September 2015
15:00

Sale	11 – 23	Caldy
	Report

Heywood Road
Attendance: 320
Referee: Ben Davis

5 September 2015
15:00

(BP) Sandal	34 – 7	Luctonians
	Report

Milnthorpe Green
Attendance: 350
Referee: Llyr Geraint-Roberts

5 September 2015
15:00

(BP) Sedgley Park	51 – 18	Broadstreet
	Report

Park Lane
Attendance: 207
Referee: Andrew Taylorson

5 September 2015
15:00

Stourbridge	22 – 5	Macclesfield
	Report

Stourton Park
Attendance: 450
Referee: Jamie Leahy

5 September 2015
15:00

(BP) Tynedale	17 – 20	Leicester Lions
	Report

Tynedale Park
Attendance: 320
Referee: Michael Harris

=== Round 2 ===
12 September 2015
14:30

Broadstreet	16 – 39	Chester (BP)
	Report

Ivor Preece Field
Attendance: 210
Referee: Neil Chivers

12 September 2015
14:30

Preston Grasshoppers	25 – 14	Sale
	Report

Lightfoot Green
Attendance: 283
Referee: Michael Harris

12 September 2015
15:00

Luctonians	18 – 27	Harrogate (BP)
	Report

Mortimer Park
Attendance: 418
Referee: Brendan McGaffney

12 September 2015
15:00

(BP) Macclesfield	34 – 27	Caldy (BP)
	Report

Priory Park
Attendance: 279
Referee: Andrew Taylorson

12 September 2015
15:00

Otley	10 – 29	Leicester Lions (BP)
	Report

Cross Green
Attendance: 275
Referee: Llyr Apgeraint-Roberts

12 September 2015
15:00

Sandal	12 – 6	Stourbridge (BP)
	Report

Milnthorpe Green
Attendance: 350
Referee: Ben Davies

12 September 2015
15:00

(BP) South Leicester	29 – 51	Sedgley Park (BP)
	Report

Welford Road Ground
Attendance: 50
Referee: Matt Turvey

12 September 2015
15:00

Tynedale	23 – 17	Huddersfield (BP)
	Report

Tynedale Park
Attendance: 274
Referee: Will Halford

=== Round 3 ===
19 September 2015
14:00

Leicester Lions	34 – 12	Luctonians
	Report

Westleigh Park
Attendance: 89
Referee: Benjamin Davis

19 September 2015
14:30

(BP) Sedgley Park	36 – 29	Tynedale (2BP)
	Report

Park Lane
Attendance: 247
Referee: Brendan McGaffney

19 September 2015
15:00

Chester	16 – 38	South Leicester (BP)
	Report

Hare Lane
Attendance: 210
Referee: Neil Chivers

19 September 2015
15:00

(BP) Harrogate	23 – 26	Sandal
	Report

Rudding Lane
Attendance: 470
Referee: Llyr Apgeraint-Roberts

19 September 2015
15:00

Huddersfield	8 – 26	Otley (BP)
	Report

Lockwood Park
Attendance: 254
Referee: Chris Bennett

19 September 2015
15:00

(BP) Macclesfield	31 – 3	Preston Grasshoppers
	Report

Priory Park
Attendance: 207
Referee: Matt Turvey

19 September 2015
15:00

(BP) Sale	27 – 18	Broadstreet
	Report

Heywood Road
Attendance: 185
Referee: Claire Hodnett

19 September 2015
15:00

(BP) Stourbridge	18 – 24	Caldy
	Report

Stourton Park
Attendance: 400
Referee: Neil Chivers

=== Round 4 ===
26 September 2015
14:00

(BP) Broadstreet	37 – 53	Macclesfield (BP)
	Report

Ivor Preece Field
Attendance: 105
Referee: Alexis Manley

26 September 2015
14:00

(BP) Preston Grasshoppers	17 – 19	Caldy
	Report

Lightfoot Green
Attendance: 287
Referee: Will Halford

26 September 2015
15:00

Harrogate	12 – 24	Stourbridge (BP)
	Report

Rudding Lane
Attendance: 250
Referee: Anthony Woodthorpe

26 September 2015
15:00

(BP) Luctonians	29 – 13	Huddersfield
	Report

Mortimer Park
Attendance: 520
Referee: Alex Thomas

26 September 2015
15:00

(BP) Otley	25 – 28	Sedgley Park (BP)
	Report

Cross Green
Attendance: 317
Referee: Benjamin Davis

26 September 2015
15:00

Sandal	24 – 18	Leicester Lions (BP)
	Report

Milnthorpe Green
Attendance: 180
Referee: Clare Hodnett

26 September 2015
15:00

(BP) South Leicester	44 – 30	Sale
	Report

Welford Road Ground
Attendance: 100
Referee: Brendan McGaffney

26 September 2015
15:00

(2BP) Tynedale	25 – 29	Chester (BP)
	Report

Tynedale Park
Attendance: 340
Referee: Peter Stentiford

=== Round 5 ===
3 October 2015
14:00

Leicester Lions	27 – 20	Harrogate (BP)
	Report

Westleigh Park
Attendance: 121
Referee: Alexis Manley

3 October 2015
14:30

(BP) Sedgley Park	53 – 28	Luctonians
	Report

Park Lane
Attendance: 202
Referee: Chris Bennett

3 October 2015
15:00

(BP) Caldy	41 – 18	Broadstreet
	Report

Paton Field
Attendance: 178
Referee: Llyr ApGeraint Roberts

3 October 2015
15:00

(BP) Chester	5 – 7	Otley
	Report

Hare Lane
Attendance: 406
Referee: Jonathon Cook

3 October 2015
15:00

Huddersfield	26 – 19	Sandal (BP)
	Report

Lockwood Park
Attendance: 247
Referee: Neil Chivers

3 October 2015
15:00

(BP) Macclesfield	47 – 19	South Leicester
	Report

Priory Park
Attendance: 221
Referee: Ben Davis

3 October 2015
15:00

Sale	31 – 23	Tynedale
	Report

Heywood Road
Attendance: 195
Referee: Anthony Woodthorpe

3 October 2015
15:00

(BP) Stourbridge	22 – 25	Preston Grasshoppers
	Report

Stourton Park
Attendance: 450
Referee: Sara Cox

=== Round 6 ===
10 October 2015
14:00

Leicester Lions	23 – 23	Stourbridge
	Report

Westleigh Park
Attendance: 193
Referee: Llyr ApGeraint Roberts

10 October 2015
14:30

Broadstreet	26 – 8	Preston Grasshoppers
	Report

Ivor Preece Field
Attendance: 98
Referee: Anthony Woodthorpe

10 October 2015
15:00

(BP) Harrogate	27 – 8	Huddersfield
	Report

Rudding Lane
Attendance: 250
Referee: Clare Hodnet

10 October 2015
15:00

Luctonians	5 – 34	Chester (BP)
	Report

Mortimer Park
Attendance: 356
Referee: Benjamin Davis

10 October 2015
15:00

(BP) Otley	40 – 34	Sale (2BP)
	Report

Cross Green
Attendance: 266
Referee: Neil Chivers

10 October 2015
15:00

Sandal	18 – 13	Sedgley Park (BP)
	Report

Milnthorpe Green
Attendance: 195
Referee: Michael Harris

10 October 2015
15:00

(BP) South Leicester	18 – 25	Caldy
	Report

Welford Road Ground
Attendance: 50
Referee: Sara Cox

10 October 2015
15:00

Tynedale	20 – 47	Macclesfield (BP)
	Report

Tynedale Park
Attendance: 210
Referee: Jonathon Cooke

=== Round 7 ===
17 October 2015
14:00

Huddersfield	27 – 23	Leicester Lions (BP)
	Report

Lockwood Park
Attendance: 274
Referee: Will Halford

17 October 2015
14:30

(BP) Preston Grasshoppers	29 – 29	South Leicester (BP)
	Report

Lightfoot Green
Attendance: 283
Referee: Chris Bennett

17 October 2015
14:30

(BP) Sedgley Park	35 – 11	Harrogate
	Report

Park Lane
Attendance: 197
Referee: Ben Davies

17 October 2015
15:00

(BP) Caldy	40 – 29	Tynedale (BP)
	Report

Paton Field
Attendance: 120
Referee: John Meredith

17 October 2015
15:00

Chester	14 – 22	Sandal
	Report

Hare Lane
Attendance: 327
Referee: Luke Haskins

17 October 2015
15:00

(BP) Macclesfield	38 – 27	Otley (BP)
	Report

Priory Park
Attendance: 214
Referee: Michael Harris

17 October 2015
15:00

(BP) Sale	40 – 30	Luctonians
	Report

Heywood Road
Attendance: 192
Referee: Llyr ApGeraint Roberts

17 October 2015
15:00

Stourbridge	23 – 15	Broadstreet
	Report

Stourton Park
Attendance: 330
Referee: James Clarke

=== Round 8 ===
24 October 2015
14:00

Huddersfield	20 – 29	Stourbridge (BP)
	Report

Lockwood Park
Attendance: 244
Referee: Andy Woodthorpe

24 October 2015
14:00

Leicester Lions	10 – 9	Sedgley Park (BP)
	Report

Westleigh Park
Attendance: 105
Referee: Sara Cox

24 October 2015
14:15

Luctonians	8 – 26	Macclesfield (BP)
	Report

Mortimer Park
Attendance: 323
Referee: Adam Leal

24 October 2015
15:00

(BP) Harrogate	39 – 22	Chester
	Report

Rudding Lane
Attendance: 220
Referee: Chris Bennett

24 October 2015
15:00

(BP) Otley	34 – 33	Caldy (2BP)
	Report

Cross Green
Attendance: 192
Referee: Ben Davis

24 October 2015
15:00

(BP) Sandal	16 – 18	Sale
	Report

Milnthorpe Green
Attendance: 350
Referee: William Halford

24 October 2015
15:00

South Leicester	22 – 16	Broadstreet (BP)
	Report

Welford Road Ground
Attendance: 125
Referee: Clare Hodnett

24 October 2015
15:00

Tynedale	20 – 18	Preston Grasshoppers (BP)
	Report

Tynedale Park
Attendance: 300
Referee: Michael Harris

=== Round 9 ===
7 November 2015
14:00

Caldy	15 – 15	Luctonians
	Report

Paton Field
Attendance: 176
Referee: Llyr ApGeraint Roberts

7 November 2015
14:15

(BP) Chester	26 – 7	Leicester Lions
	Report

Hare Lane
Attendance: 307
Referee: Benjamin Davis

7 November 2015
14:15

(BP) Sale	22 – 25	Harrogate
	Report

Heywood Road
Attendance: 302
Referee: Andrew Taylorson

7 November 2015
14:15

(BP) South Leicester	27 – 26	Stourbridge (2BP)
	Report

Welford Road Ground
Attendance: 130
Referee: Neil Chivers

7 November 2015
14:30

Broadstreet	28 – 19	Tynedale
	Report

Ivor Preece Field
Attendance: 276
Referee: Sara Cox

7 November 2015
14:30

Preston Grasshoppers	3 – 17	Otley
	Report

Lightfoot Green
Attendance: 402
Referee: Jamie Leahy

7 November 2015
15:00

(BP) Sedgley Park	32 – 15	Huddersfield
	Report

Park Lane
Attendance: 188
Referee: Michael Harris

7 November 2015
15:00

(BP) Macclesfield	29 – 3	Sandal
	Report

Priory Park
Attendance: 293
Referee: Jonathan Cook

=== Round 10 ===
14 November 2015
14:00

(BP) Harrogate	17 – 22	Macclesfield
	Report

Rudding Lane
Attendance: 200
Referee: Brendan McGaffney

14 November 2015
14:00

(BP) Leicester Lions	38 – 6	Sale
	Report

Westleigh Park
Attendance: 106
Referee: Neil Chivers

14 November 2015
14:15

(BP) Luctonians	19 – 25	Preston Grasshoppers
	Report

Mortimer Park
Attendance: 320
Referee: Adam Leal

14 November 2015
14:15

Otley	15 – 10	Broadstreet (BP)
	Report

Cross Green
Attendance: 246
Referee: Matthew Turvey

14 November 2015
14:15

Sandal	6 – 3	Caldy (BP)
	Report

Milnthorpe Green
Attendance: 100
Referee: Mike Harris

14 November 2015
14:30

(BP) Sedgley Park	19 – 24	Stourbridge
	Report

Park Lane
Attendance: 260
Referee: Andrew Taylorson

14 November 2015
15:00

Huddersfield	23 – 14	Chester
	Report

Lockwood Park
Attendance: 322
Referee: Chris Bennett

14 November 2015
15:00

(BP) Tynedale	34 – 24	South Leicester
	Report

Tynedale Park
Attendance: 240
Referee: David Charlton

=== Round 11 ===
21 November 2015
14:00

(2BP) Caldy	26 – 31	Harrogate
	Report

Paton Field
Attendance: 121
Referee: Andrew Taylorson

21 November 2015
14:15

Chester	24 – 36	Sedgley Park (BP)
	Report

Hare Lane
Attendance: 332
Referee: Callum Sharp

21 November 2015
14:15

Sale	19 – 13	Huddersfield (BP)
	Report

Heywood Road
Attendance: 220
Referee: Brendan McGaffney

21 November 2015
14:15

South Leicester	22 – 30	Otley (BP)
	Report

Welford Road Ground
Attendance: 100

21 November 2015
14:30

Broadstreet	11 – 32	Luctonians (BP)
	Report

Ivor Preece Field
Attendance: 147
Referee: Michael Harris

21 November 2015
14:30

Preston Grasshoppers	25 – 18	Sandal (BP)
	Report

Lightfoot Green
Attendance: 347
Referee: Ben Davis

21 November 2015
15:00

(BP) Macclesfield	43 – 0	Leicester Lions
	Report

Priory Park
Attendance: 375
Referee: Claire Hodnett

21 November 2015
15:00

(BP) Stourbridge	39 – 11	Tynedale
	Report

Stourton Park
Attendance: 336
Referee: Chris Bennett

=== Round 12 ===
28 November 2015
14:00

Harrogate	15 – 5	Preston Grasshoppers
	Report

Rudding Lane
Attendance: 180
Referee: Alex Thomas

28 November 2015
14:00

Leicester Lions	15 – 14	Caldy (BP)
	Report

Westleigh Park
Attendance: 119
Referee: David Clarkson

28 November 2015
14:15

(BP) Chester	11 – 18	Stourbridge
	Report

Hare Lane
Attendance: 352
Referee: Matt Turvey

28 November 2015
14:15

Luctonians	13 – 5	South Leicester
	Report

Mortimer Park
Attendance: 245
Referee: Chris Bennett

28 November 2015
14:15

(BP) Otley	12 – 13	Tynedale
	Report

Cross Green
Attendance: 275
Referee: Michael Harris

28 November 2015
14:15

(BP) Sandal	13 – 15	Broadstreet
	Report

Milnthorpe Green
Attendance: 140
Referee: Brendan McGaffney

28 November 2015
14:30

Sedgley Park	17 – 13	Sale
	Report

Park Lane
Attendance: 295
Referee: Ben Davies

28 November 2015
15:00

Huddersfield	24 – 38	Macclesfield (BP)
	Report

Lockwood Park
Attendance: 268
Referee: Andrew Taylorson

=== Round 13 ===
5 December 2015
14:00

(BP) Caldy	31 – 15	Huddersfield
	Report

Paton Field
Attendance: 121
Referee: Michael Harris

5 December 2015
14:00

Tynedale	P – P	Luctonians

- Postponed due to severe weather and flooding. Game rescheduled to 27 February 2016.

5 December 2015
14:15

(BP) Sale	15 – 21	Chester
	Report

Heywood Road
Attendance: 288
Referee: Brendan McGaffney

5 December 2015
14:15

(BP) South Leicester	20 – 25	Sandal (BP)
	Report

Welford Road Ground
Attendance: 75
Referee: Jonathon Cook

5 December 2015
14:30

Broadstreet	23 – 8	Harrogate
	Report

Ivor Preece Field
Attendance: 175
Referee: Jack Lewars

5 December 2015
14:30

Preston Grasshoppers	P – P	Leicester Lions

- Postponed due to severe weather causing flooding. Game rescheduled to 27 February 2016.

5 December 2015
15:00

Macclesfield	12 – 27	Sedgley Park
	Report

Priory Park
Attendance: 275
Referee: Matt Turvey

5 December 2015
15:00

Stourbridge	25 – 8	Otley
	Report

Stourton Park
Attendance: 460
Referee: Adam Leal

=== Round 14 ===
12 December 2015
14:00

Harrogate	P – P	South Leicester

- Postponed due to waterlogged pitch. Game rescheduled to 27 February 2016.

12 December 2015
14:00

Leicester Lions	12 – 3	Broadstreet
	Report

Westleigh Park
Attendance: 121
Referee: Luke Haskins

12 December 2015
14:15

Chester	10 – 35	Macclesfield (BP)
	Report

Hare Lane
Attendance: 890
Referee: Michael Harris

12 December 2015
14:15

(BP) Luctonians	27 – 19	Otley
	Report

Mortimer Park
Attendance: 420
Referee: Brendan McGafferty

12 December 2015
14:15

Sale	13 – 10	Stourbridge (BP)
	Report

Heywood Road
Attendance: 220
Referee: Andrew Taylorson

12 December 2015
14:15

Sandal	17 – 0	Tynedale
	Report

Milnthorpe Green
Attendance: 192
Referee: Alex Thomas

12 December 2015
14:30

Sedgley Park	P – P	Caldy

- Postponed due to waterlogged pitch. Game rescheduled to 27 February 2016.

12 December 2015
15:00

Huddersfield	6 – 32	Preston Grasshoppers (BP)
	Report

Lockwood Park
Attendance: 268
Referee: James Brown

=== Round 15 ===
19 December 2015
14:00

Caldy	20 – 13	Chester (BP)

Paton Field
Attendance: 272
Referee: Benjamin Davis

19 December 2015
14:00

(BP) Otley	29 – 13	Sandal
	Report

Cross Green
Attendance: 353
Referee: Andrew Taylorson

19 December 2015
14:00

Tynedale	25 – 10	Harrogate
	Report

Kingston Park, Newcastle upon Tyne
Attendance: 584
Referee: William Halford

19 December 2015
14:15

South Leicester	29 – 22	Leicester Lions (BP)
	Report

Welford Road Ground
Attendance: 300
Referee: Llyr ApGeraint Roberts

19 December 2015
14:30

(BP) Broadstreet	20 – 27	Huddersfield (BP)
	Report

Ivor Preece Field
Attendance: 155
Referee: Alex Thomas

19 December 2015
14:30

Preston Grasshoppers	18 – 15	Sedgley Park (BP)
	Report

Lightfoot Green
Attendance: 355
Referee: Brendan McGaffney

19 December 2015
15:00

(BP) Macclesfield	54 – 7	Sale
	Report

Priory Park
Attendance: 452
Referee: Jamie Leahy

19 December 2015
15:00

Stourbridge	27 – 18	Luctonians
	Report

Stourton Park
Attendance: 480
Referee: Matthew O'Grady

=== Round 16 ===
2 January 2016
14:00

Caldy	29 – 24	Macclesfield (2BP)
	Report

Paton Field
Attendance: 205
Referee: Matt Turvey

2 January 2016
14:00

Harrogate	P – P	Luctonians

- Postponed due to pitch being deemed unsuitable to play due to heavy rain. Game rescheduled to 12 March 2016.

2 January 2016
14:00

(BP) Leicester Lions	33 – 12	Otley
	Report

Westleigh Park
Attendance: 119
Referee: Chris Bennett

2 January 2016
14:15

Chester	12 – 10	Broadstreet (BP)
	Report

Hare Lane
Attendance: 289
Referee: Andrew Taylorson

2 January 2016
14:15

Sale	22 – 22	Preston Grasshoppers
	Report

Heywood Road
Attendance: 245
Referee: William Halford

2 January 2016
14:30

Sedgley Park	17 – 39	South Leicester (BP)
	Report

Park Lane
Attendance: 175
Referee: Mick Harris

2 January 2016
15:00

(BP) Huddersfield	17 – 20	Tynedale
	Report

Lockwood Park
Attendance: 284
Referee: Benjamin Davies

2 January 2016
15:00

(BP) Stourbridge	33 – 15	Sandal
	Report

Stourton Park
Attendance: 400
Referee: Luke Haskins

=== Round 17 ===
9 January 2016
14:00

(BP) Caldy	10 – 15	Stourbridge
	Report

Paton Field
Attendance: 200
Referee: Christopher Bennett

9 January 2016
14:15

Luctonians	11 – 10	Leicester Lions (BP)
	Report

Mortimer Park
Attendance: 220
Referee: Alexis Manley

9 January 2016
14:15

Otley	20 – 10	Huddersfield
	Report

Cross Green
Attendance: 279
Referee: Neil Chivers

9 January 2016
14:15

Sandal	17 – 35	Harrogate (BP)
	Report

Milnthorpe Green
Attendance: 220
Referee: Ben Davis

9 January 2016
14:15

South Leicester	3 – 20	Chester
	Report

Welford Road Ground
Attendance: 100
Referee: Will Halford

9 January 2016
14:30

(BP) Broadstreet	36 – 28	Sale (BP)
	Report

Ivor Preece Field
Attendance: 195
Referee: Graeme Ormiston

9 January 2016
14:30

Preston Grasshoppers	P – P	Macclesfield

- Postponed due to waterlogged pitch caused by heavy rain. Game to be rescheduled for 12 March 2016.

9 January 2016
18:30

(BP) Tynedale	13 – 15	Sedgley Park
	Report

Kingston Park, Newcastle upon Tyne
Attendance: 520
Referee: Andrew Taylorson

=== Round 18 ===
16 January 2016
14:00

Caldy	13 – 13	Preston Grasshoppers
	Report

Paton Field
Attendance: 161
Referee: Michael Harris

16 January 2016
14:00

Leicester Lions	25 – 0	Sandal
	Report

Westleigh Park
Attendance: 142
Referee: Brendan McGaffery

16 January 2016
14:15

Chester	P – P	Tynedale

- Postponed due to waterlogged pitch. Game to be rescheduled for 12 March 2016.

16 January 2016
14:15

Sale	P – P	South Leicester

- Postponed due to frozen pitch. Game to be rescheduled for 12 March 2016.

16 January 2016
14:30

Sedgley Park	P – P	Otley

- Postponed due to bad weather. Game to be rescheduled for 12 March 2016.

16 January 2016
15:00

Huddersfield	P – P	Luctonians

- Postponed due to frozen pitch. Game to be rescheduled for 26 March 2016.

16 January 2016
15:00

Macclesfield	P – P	Broadstreet

- Postponed due to bad weather. Game to be rescheduled for 27 February 2016.

16 January 2016
15:00

Stourbridge	23 – 10	Harrogate
	Report

Stourton Park
Attendance: 390
Referee: Will Halford

=== Round 19 ===
23 January 2016
14:00

(BP) Harrogate	12 – 13	Leicester Lions
	Report

Rudding Lane
Attendance: 250
Referee: Andrew Taylorson

23 January 2016
14:15

Luctonians	10 – 35	Sedgley Park (BP)
	Report

Mortimer Park
Attendance: 320
Referee: David Clarkson

23 January 2016
14:15

Otley	20 – 19	Chester (BP)
	Report

Cross Green
Attendance: 286
Referee: Will Halford

23 January 2016
14:15

Sandal	13 – 12	Huddersfield (BP)
	Report

Milnthorpe Green
Attendance: 240
Referee: Chris Bennett

23 January 2016
14:15

South Leicester	12 – 32	Macclesfield (BP)
	Report

Welford Road Ground
Attendance: 110
Referee: Ben Blain

23 January 2016
14:30

(BP) Broadstreet	14 – 15	Caldy
	Report

Ivor Preece Field
Attendance: 130
Referee: Neil Chivers

23 January 2016
14:30

Preston Grasshoppers	29 – 18	Stourbridge
	Report

Lightfoot Green
Attendance: 314
Referee: Callum Sharpe

23 January 2016
18:30

Tynedale	21 – 16	Sale (BP)
	Report

Kingston Park, Newcastle upon Tyne
Attendance: 560
Referee: Brendan McGaffney

=== Round 20 ===
30 January 2016
14:00

Caldy	31 – 6	South Leicester
	Report

Paton Field
Attendance: 121
Referee: Will Halford

30 January 2016
14:15

(BP) Chester	25 – 27	Luctonians (BP)
	Report

Hare Lane
Attendance: 293
Referee: Matt Turvey

30 January 2016
14:15

Sale	22 – 16	Otley (BP)
	Report

Heywood Road
Attendance: 197
Referee: Ben Davies

30 January 2016
14:30

(BP) Preston Grasshoppers	31 – 13	Broadstreet
	Report

Lightfoot Green
Attendance: 281
Referee: Chris Bennett

30 January 2016
14:30

Sedgley Park	P – P	Sandal

- Postponed due to Sandal being unwilling to play what they considered to be an unsafe pitch caused by recent rain. Game to be rescheduled for 26 March 2016.

30 January 2016
15:00

Huddersfield	9 – 22	Harrogate
	Report

Lockwood Park
Attendance: 312
Referee: Jonathan Cook

30 January 2016
15:00

(BP) Macclesfield	33 – 26	Tynedale (2BP)
	Report

Priory Park
Attendance: 252
Referee: Michael Harris

30 January 2016
15:00

(BP) Stourbridge	3 – 10	Leicester Lions
	Report

Stourton Park
Attendance: 360
Referee: Neil Chivers

=== Round 21 ===
6 February 2016
14:00

Harrogate	P – P	Sedgley Park

- Postponed due to bad weather conditions. Game to be rescheduled for 7 May 2016.

6 February 2016
14:00

Leicester Lions	5 – 3	Huddersfield (BP)
	Report

Westleigh Park
Attendance: 89
Referee: Chris Bennett

6 February 2016
14:15

Luctonians	P – P	Sale

- Postponed due to waterlogged pitch caused by heavy rain. Game to be rescheduled for 7 May 2016.

6 February 2016
14:15

Otley	P – P	Macclesfield

- Postponed due to waterlogged pitch caused by heavy rain. Game to be rescheduled for 26 March 2016.

6 February 2016
14:15

South Leicester	P – P	Preston Grasshoppers

- Postponed due to waterlogged pitch caused by heavy rain. Game to be rescheduled for 26 March 2016.

6 February 2016
14:30

Broadstreet	19 – 12	Stourbridge (BP)
	Report

Ivor Preece Field
Attendance: 275
Referee: Luke Haskins

6 February 2016
14:30

(BP) Sandal	13 – 19	Chester
	Report

Milnthorpe Green
Attendance: 190
Referee: Alex Thomas

6 February 2016
15:00

Tynedale	17 – 7	Caldy
	Report

Kingston Park, Newcastle upon Tyne
Attendance: 450
Referee: Neil Chivers

=== Round 22 ===
13 February 2016
14:00

(BP) Caldy	10 – 15	Otley
	Report

Paton Field
Attendance: 216
Referee: Chris Bennett

13 February 2016
14:15

(2BP) Chester	23 – 27	Harrogate (BP)
	Report

Hare Lane
Attendance: 324
Referee: Neil Chivers

13 February 2016
14:15

Sale	26 – 20	Sandal (BP)
	Report

Heywood Road
Attendance: 249
Referee: Brendan McGaffney

13 February 2016
14:30

(BP) Broadstreet	29 – 30	South Leicester (BP)
	Report

Ivor Preece Field
Attendance: 200
Referee: Luis Caviglia

13 February 2016
14:30

(BP) Preston Grasshoppers	39 – 16	Tynedale
	Report

Lightfoot Green
Attendance: 292
Referee: Jack Lewars

13 February 2016
14:30

(BP) Sedgley Park	30 – 5	Leicester Lions
	Report

Park Lane
Attendance: 295
Referee: Mike Harris

13 February 2016
15:00

Macclesfield	22 – 19	Luctonians (BP)
	Report

Priory Park
Attendance: 392
Referee: Daniel Parrott

13 February 2016
15:00

Stourbridge	25 – 19	Huddersfield (BP)
	Report

Stourton Park
Attendance: 290
Referee: Benjamin Davis

=== Round 23 ===
20 February 2016
14:00

Harrogate	17 – 6	Sale
	Report

Rudding Lane
Attendance: 240
Referee: Luke Haskins

20 February 2016
14:00

Leicester Lions	19 – 14	Chester (BP)
	Report

Westleigh Park
Attendance: 145
Referee: Benjamin Davis

20 February 2016
14:15

Luctonians	17 – 3	Caldy
	Report

Mortimer Park
Attendance: 365
Referee: Neil Chivers

20 February 2016
14:15

Otley	15 – 8	Preston Grasshoppers (BP)
	Report

Cross Green
Attendance: 358
Referee: Callum Sharpe

20 February 2016
14:15

Sandal	7 – 31	Macclesfield (BP)
	Report

Milnthorpe Green
Attendance: 165
Referee: Will Halford

20 February 2016
15:00

Huddersfield	13 – 21	Sedgley Park
	Report

Lockwood Park
Attendance: 322
Referee: Claire Hodnett

20 February 2016
15:00

Stourbridge	12 – 6	South Leicester (BP)
	Report

Stourton Park
Attendance: 260
Referee: Michael Harris

20 February 2016
15:15

(2BP) Tynedale	34 – 40	Broadstreet (BP)
	Report

Kingston Park, Newcastle upon Tyne
Attendance: 227
Referee: Matt Turvey

=== Rounds 13, 14 & 18 (rescheduled games) ===
27 February 2016
14:00

(BP) Harrogate	42 – 22	South Leicester
	Report

Rudding Lane
Attendance: 200
Referee: Ben Davis

- Game rescheduled from 12 December 2015.

27 February 2016
14:30

(BP) Preston Grasshoppers	17 – 20	Leicester Lions
	Report

Lightfoot Green
Attendance: 253
Referee: Hamish Smales

- Game rescheduled from 5 December 2015.

27 February 2016
14:30

(BP) Sedgley Park	20 – 24	Caldy
	Report

Park Lane
Attendance: 160
Referee: Ben Blain

- Game rescheduled from 12 December 2015.

27 February 2016
14:30

(BP) Tynedale	24 – 26	Luctonians
	Report

Kingston Park, Newcastle upon Tyne
Attendance: 460
Referee: Louis Silver

- Game rescheduled from 5 December 2015.

27 February 2016
15:00

Macclesfield	15 – 3	Broadstreet
	Report

Priory Park
Attendance: 215
Referee: Matt Turvey

- Game rescheduled from 16 January 2016.

=== Round 24 ===
5 March 2016
14:15

(BP) Chester	30 – 13	Huddersfield
	Report

Hare Lane
Attendance: 283
Referee: Hamish Smales

5 March 2016
14:30

(BP) Broadstreet	12 – 19	Otley
	Report

Ivor Preece Field
Attendance: 175
Referee: Ben Davis

5 March 2016
14:30

(BP) Preston Grasshoppers	24 – 31	Luctonians (BP)
	Report

Lightfoot Green
Attendance: 232
Referee: Will Halford

5 March 2016
15:00

(BP) Caldy	26 – 15	Sandal
	Report

Paton Field
Attendance: 211
Referee: Graeme Ormiston

5 March 2016
15:00

Macclesfield	P – P	Harrogate

- Postponed due to bad weather conditions. Game to be rescheduled for 14 May 2016.

5 March 2016
15:00

(BP) Sale	12 – 16	Leicester Lions
	Report

Heywood Road
Attendance: 206
Referee: David Conway

5 March 2016
15:00

(BP) South Leicester	34 – 3	Tynedale
	Report

Welford Road Ground
Attendance: 89
Referee: Anthony Woodthorpe

5 March 2016
15:00

Stourbridge	15 – 7	Sedgley Park
	Report

Stourton Park
Attendance: 450
Referee: Jamie Leahy

=== Rounds 16, 17 & 18 (rescheduled games) ===
12 March 2016
14:00

(BP) Harrogate	24 – 26	Luctonians (BP)
	Report

Rudding Lane
Attendance: 215
Referee: Neil Chivers

- Game rescheduled from 2 January 2016.

12 March 2016
14:00

Preston Grasshoppers	16 – 38	Macclesfield (BP)

Lightfoot Green
Attendance: 253
Referee: Llyr ApGeraint Roberts

- Game rescheduled from 9 January 2016.

12 March 2016
14:15

(2BP) Chester	22 – 23	Tynedale
	Report

Hare Lane
Attendance: 281
Referee: Brendan McGaffney

- Game rescheduled from 16 January 2016.

12 March 2016
14:15

Sale	17 – 17	South Leicester
	Report

Heywood Road
Attendance: 212
Referee: Will Halford

- Game rescheduled from 16 January 2016.

12 March 2016
14:15

(BP) Sedgley Park	28 – 26	Otley (2BP)
	Report

Park Lane
Attendance: 202
Referee: Hamish Smales

- Game rescheduled from 16 January 2016.

=== Round 25 ===
19 March 2016
14:00

(BP) Leicester Lions	15 – 20	Macclesfield
	Report

Westleigh Park
Attendance: 89
Referee: William Halford

19 March 2016
14:00

(BP) Tynedale	38 – 17	Stourbridge
	Report

Kingston Park, Newcastle upon Tyne
Attendance: 450
Referee: John Meredith

19 March 2016
14:15

Luctonians	26 – 23	Broadstreet (BP)
	Report

Mortimer Park
Attendance: 235
Referee: Chris Bennett

19 March 2016
14:30

(BP) Sedgley Park	48 – 5	Chester
	Report

Park Lane
Attendance: 231
Referee: Jamie Leahy

19 March 2016
15:00

(BP) Harrogate	36 – 21	Caldy
	Report

Rudding Lane
Attendance: 280
Referee: Claire Hodnett

19 March 2016
15:00

(BP) Huddersfield	28 – 35	Sale (BP)
	Report

Lockwood Park
Attendance: 246
Referee: Ben Davies

19 March 2016
15:00

Otley	10 – 8	South Leicester (BP)
	Report

Cross Green
Attendance: 320
Referee: Michael Harris

19 March 2016
15:00

(BP) Sandal	20 – 24	Preston Grasshoppers (BP)
	Report

Milnthorpe Green
Attendance: 212
Referee: Luke Haskins

=== Rounds 18, 20 & 21 (rescheduled games) ===
26 March 2016
14:30

(BP) Sedgley Park	83 – 17	Sandal
	Report

Park Lane
Attendance: 300
Referee: Llyr ApGeraint Roberts

- Game rescheduled from 30 January 2016.

26 March 2016
15:00

(BP) Huddersfield	37 – 32	Luctonians (2BP)
	Report

Lockwood Park
Attendance: 289
Referee: Luke Haskins

- Game rescheduled from 16 January 2016.

26 March 2016
15:00

(2BP) Otley	26 – 27	Macclesfield (BP)
	Report

Cross Green
Attendance: 257
Referee: Andrew Taylorson

- Game rescheduled from 6 February 2016.

26 March 2016
15:00

South Leicester	19 – 0	Preston Grasshoppers
	Report

Welford Road Ground
Attendance: 90
Referee: Claire Hodnett

- Game rescheduled from 6 February 2016.

=== Round 26 ===
2 April 2016
14:30

Broadstreet	19 – 8	Sandal
	Report

Ivor Preece Field
Attendance: 195
Referee: Llyr ApGeraint-Roberts

2 April 2016
14:30

Preston Grasshoppers	12 – 6	Harrogate (BP)
	Report

Lightfoot Green
Attendance: 552
Referee: Chris Bennett

2 April 2016
15:00

Caldy	22 – 14	Leicester Lions
	Report

Paton Field
Attendance: 211
Referee: Matt Turvey

2 April 2016
15:00

(BP) Macclesfield	22 – 10	Huddersfield
	Report

Priory Park
Attendance: 378
Referee: Jamie Leahy

2 April 2016
15:00

Sale	15 – 30	Sedgley Park (BP)
	Report

Heywood Road
Attendance: 378
Referee: Mike Harris

2 April 2016
15:00

(BP) South Leicester	22 – 22	Luctonians
	Report

Welford Road Ground
Attendance: 100
Referee: Benjamin Davies

2 April 2016
15:00

(BP) Stourbridge	35 – 17	Chester
	Report

Stourton Park
Attendance: 426
Referee: Andrew Taylorson

2 April 2016
15:00

(BP) Tynedale	50 – 17	Otley
	Report

Kingston Park, Newcastle upon Tyne
Attendance: 550
Referee: Jonathon Cook

=== Round 27 ===
9 April 2016
14:00

(BP) Leicester Lions	25 – 8	Preston Grasshoppers
	Report

Westleigh Park
Attendance: 131
Referee: Alex Thomas

9 April 2016
14:30

(2BP) Sedgley Park	33 – 34	Macclesfield (BP)
	Report

Park Lane
Attendance: 297
Referee: Ben Blain

9 April 2016
15:00

(BP) Chester	41 – 24	Sale
	Report

Hare Lane
Attendance: 325
Referee: Daniel Parrott

9 April 2016
15:00

Harrogate	23 – 15	Broadstreet
	Report

Rudding Lane
Attendance: 300
Referee: Hamish Smales

9 April 2016
15:00

Huddersfield	12 – 22	Caldy
	Report

Lockwood Park
Attendance: 385
Referee: Lylr ApGeraint-Roberts

- Huddersfield are relegated.

9 April 2016
15:00

Luctonians	17 – 12	Tynedale (BP)

Mortimer Park
Attendance: 330
Referee: Shane Lewis

9 April 2016
15:00

Otley	19 – 27	Stourbridge (BP)
	Report

Cross Green
Attendance: 348
Referee: Claire Hodnett

9 April 2016
15:00

Sandal	29 – 20	South Leicester
	Report

Milnthorpe Green
Attendance: 280
Referee: Neil Chivers

=== Round 28 ===
16 April 2016
14:30

Broadstreet	14 – 36	Leicester Lions (BP)
	Report

Ivor Preece Field
Attendance: 255
Referee: Brendan McGaffney

- Broadstreet are relegated.

16 April 2016
14:30

(BP) Preston Grasshoppers	57 – 17	Huddersfield
	Report

Lightfoot Green
Attendance: 534
Referee: Callum Sharp

16 April 2016
15:00

(BP) Caldy	34 – 19	Sedgley Park
	Report

Paton Field
Attendance: 211
Referee: Chris Bennett

16 April 2016
15:00

(BP) Macclesfield	40 – 12	Chester
	Report

Priory Park
Attendance: 411
Referee: Jack Lewars

16 April 2016
15:00

(2BP) Otley	28 – 32	Luctonians (BP)
	Report

Cross Green
Attendance: 208
Referee: Lylr ApGeraint-Roberts

16 April 2016
15:00

(BP) South Leicester	36 – 21	Harrogate
	Report

Welford Road Ground
Attendance: 100
Referee: Claire Hodnett

16 April 2016
15:00

Stourbridge	10 – 23	Sale
	Report

Stourton Park
Attendance: 570
Referee: Ben Davies

16 April 2016
18:30

(BP) Tynedale	20 – 20	Sandal
	Report

Kingston Park, Newcastle upon Tyne
Attendance: 224
Referee: Andrew Taylorson

=== Round 29 ===
23 April 2016
14:00

(BP) Leicester Lions	43 – 7	South Leicester
	Report

Westleigh Park
Attendance: 150
Referee: Phillip Davies

23 April 2016
14:30

(BP) Sedgley Park	62 – 27	Preston Grasshoppers (BP)
	Report

Park Lane
Attendance: 290
Referee: Daniel Parrott

23 April 2016
15:00

Chester (BP)	20 – 26	Caldy (BP)
	Report

Hare Lane
Attendance: 357
Referee: Neil Chivers

23 April 2016
15:00

Harrogate	29 – 17	Tynedale
	Report

Rudding Lane
Attendance: 340
Referee: Ben Davies

23 April 2016
15:00

(BP) Huddersfield	29 – 28	Broadstreet (2BP)
	Report

Lockwood Park
Attendance: 228
Referee: Jonathon Cook

23 April 2016
15:00

(2BP) Luctonians	22 – 26	Stourbridge (BP)
	Report

Mortimer Park
Attendance: 821
Referee: Chris Bennett

23 April 2016
15:00

(BP) Sale	29 – 12	Macclesfield
	Report

Heywood Road
Attendance: 420
Referee: William Halford

23 April 2016
15:00

(BP) Sandal	34 – 12	Otley
	Report

Milnthorpe Green
Attendance: 250
Referee: Claire Hodnett

=== Round 30 ===
23 April 2016
15:00

Broadstreet	5 – 29	Sedgley Park (BP)
	Report

Ivor Preece Field
Attendance: 102
Referee: Ben Davis

23 April 2016
15:00

Caldy	8 – 16	Sale
	Report

Paton Field
Attendance: 295
Referee: Luke Haskins

23 April 2016
15:00

(BP) Leicester Lions	29 – 37	Tynedale (BP)
	Report

Westleigh Park
Attendance: 117
Referee: Chris Bennett

23 April 2016
15:00

(BP) Luctonians	35 – 12	Sandal
	Report

Mortimer Park
Attendance: 266
Referee: Brendan McGaffney

- Sandal are relegated.

23 April 2016
15:00

(BP) Macclesfield	43 – 19	Stourbridge
	Report

Priory Park
Attendance: 417
Referee: Jamie Leahy

23 April 2016
15:00

Preston Grasshoppers	16 – 22	Chester (BP)
	Report

Lightfoot Green
Attendance: 402
Referee: Andrew Taylorson

23 April 2016
15:00

(BP) South Leicester	40 – 14	Huddersfield
	Report

Welford Road Ground
Attendance: 125
Referee: James Clarke

23 April 2016
17:30

(BP) Otley	20 – 22 (Note: Game would be a double header for both the league and the quarter-finals of the Yorkshire Cup.)	Harrogate
	Report

Cross Green
Attendance: 573
Referee: Michael Harris

=== Round 21 (rescheduled games) ===
7 May 2016
15:00

Harrogate	6 – 53	Sedgley Park (BP)
	Report

Rudding Lane
Attendance: 265
Referee: Jamie Leahy

- Game rescheduled from 6 February 2016.

7 May 2016
15:00

(BP) Luctonians	47 – 24	Sale (BP)
	Report

Mortimer Park
Attendance: 478
Referee: Daniel Parrott

- Game rescheduled from 6 February 2016.

=== Round 24 (rescheduled game) ===
14 May 2016
15:00

Macclesfield	C – C	Harrogate

- Game originally rescheduled from 5 March 2016 but would ultimately be cancelled at Harrogate's request as the game would not affect the final league table standings.

=== Promotion play-off ===
Each season, the runners-up in the National League 2 North and National League 2 South and participate in a play-off for promotion to National Division 1. Old Albanian were runners-up in the 2015–16 National League 2 South and because they had a better record than the 2015–16 National League 2 North runners-up, Sedgley Park, they hosted the play-off match.

Team	Pld	W	D	L	PF	PA	PD	TB	LB	Pts
Old Albanian	30	25	1	4	1040	468	+572	23	3	128
Sedgley Park	30	21	0	9	951	562	+389	18	6	108

14 May 2016
14:30

Old Albanian	24 – 0	Sedgley Park

Woollam Playing Fields
Attendance: 473
Referee: Gareth Holsgrove

== Season attendances ==
Club	Home Games	Total	Average	Highest	Lowest	% Capacity
Broadstreet	15	2,693	180	276	98	12%
Caldy	15	2,819	188	295	120	5%
Chester	15	5,354	357	890	210	18%
Harrogate	15	4,710	314	1,050	180	16%
Huddersfield	15	4,091	273	385	148	18%
Leicester Lions	15	1,836	122	193	89	6%
Luctonians	15	5,637	376	821	220	15%
Macclesfield	14 (Note: Macclesfield only played 14 home games as their rescheduled game against Harrogate was mutually cancelled due to it being a 'dead rubber' that would have no adverse impact on the final league standings.)	4,381	313	452	207	25%
Otley	15	4,553	304	573	192	4%
Preston Grasshoppers	15	5,070	338	552	232	15%
Sale	15	3,829	255	420	185	5%
Sandal	15	3,414	228	350	100	
Sedgley Park	15	3,546	236	300	160	8%
South Leicester	15	1,644	110	300	50	
Stourbridge	15	6,052	403	570	260	12%
Tynedale	15	5,709	381	584	210	9%

== Individual statistics ==
- Note that points scorers includes tries as well as conversions, penalties and drop goals. Appearance figures also include coming on as substitutes (unused substitutes not included). Does not include promotion playoff.

=== Top points scorers ===
Rank	Player	Team	Appearances	Points
1	(England) Lewis Minikin	Harrogate	28	299
2	(England) Liam McGovern	Sale	28	279
3	(England) Lewis Barker	Macclesfield	27	247
4	(England) Sean Taylor	Preston Grasshoppers	25	241
5	(England) Stephen Collins	Sedgley Park	20	209
6	(England) Greg Wood	Sandal	27	205
7	(England) Chris Bell	Huddersfield	28	203
8	(England) Louis Silver	Luctonians	22	197
9	(England) Rickie Aley	South Leicester	25	169
10	(Wales) Rhys Hayes	Chester	26	166

=== Top try scorers ===
Rank	Player	Team	Appearances	Tries
1	(England) Nick Royle	Caldy	30	25
2	(England) Andrew Riley	Sedgley Park	29	21
3	(England) Ryan Parkinson	Macclesfield	28	19
4	(England) Devon Constant	Leicester Lions	27	18
5	(England) Elliot Brierley	Macclesfield	26	17
6	(England) Jamie Harrison	Sedgley Park	25	16
6	(England) Lewis Minikin	Harrogate	28	16
7	(England) David Marwick	Macclesfield	28	15
8	(England) Joshua Fowles	Macclesfield	24	14
8	(England) Calum Gunn	South Leicester	26	14
8	(England) Callum Irvine	Harrogate	28	14
8	(England) Matthew Riley	Sedgley Park	28	14

== Season records ==
=== Team ===
Largest home win – 66 pts

83 – 17 Sedgley Park at home to Sandal on 26 March 2016

Largest away win – 47 pts

53 – 6 Sedgley Park away to Harrogate on 7 May 2016

Most points scored – 83

83 – 17 Sedgley Park at home to Sandal on 26 March 2016

Most tries in a match – 13

Sedgley Park at home to Sandal on 26 March 2016

Most conversions in a match – 9

Sedgley Park at home to Sandal on 26 March 2016

Most penalties in a match – 6 (x3)

Stourbridge at home to Caldy on 19 September 2015
Preston Grasshoppers away to Stourbridge on 3 October 2015
Caldy away to South Leicester on 10 October 2015

Most drop goals in a match – 1

N/A – multiple teams

=== Player ===
Most points in a match – 28 (x2)

(England) Lewis Barker for Macclesfield away to Huddersfield on 28 November 2015
(England) Matt Riley for Sedgley Park at home to Sandal on 26 March 2016

Most tries in a match – 3

N/A – multiple players

Most conversions in a match – 9

(England) Matt Riley for Sedgley Park at home to Sandal on 26 March 2016

Most penalties in a match – 6 (x2)

(England) Christopher Scott for Stourbridge at home to Caldy on 19 September 2015
(England) Sean Taylor for Preston Grasshoppers away to Stourbridge on 3 October 2015

Most drop goals in a match – 1

N/A – multiple players

=== Attendances ===
Highest – 1,050

Harrogate at home to Otley on 5 September 2015

Lowest – 50 (x2)

South Leicester at home to Sedgley Park on 12 September 2015
South Leicester at home to Caldy on 10 October 2015

Highest Average Attendance – 403

Stourbridge

Lowest Average Attendance – 110

South Leicester

== See also ==
- English rugby union system
- Rugby union in England
