= 2015–16 National League 2 South =

Rugby union competition in England

- Countries: England
- Date: 5 September 2015 – 14 May 2016
- Champions: Cambridge (2nd title)
- Runners-up: Old Albanian (also promoted)
- Relegated: Launceston, Southend Saxons, Dorking
- Attendance: 88,674 (average 369 per match)
- Highest attendance: 1,145; Cambridge v Dorking; 30 April 2016
- Lowest attendance: 72; Barnes v Taunton Titans; 2 January 2016
- Top point scorer: (England) Gary Kingdom (Taunton Titans); 283 points
- Top try scorer: (England) Albert Portsmouth (Cambridge); 31 tries

The 2015–16 National League 2 South is the seventh season (29th overall) of the fourth tier (south) of the English domestic rugby union competitions since the professionalised format of the second division was introduced. There was talk of this being the last season in this format due to RFU changes to tier four which were supposed to result in a restructuring of the league from two regional divisions (north and south) to three (north, south-east and south-west) for the 2016–17 season but this seems to have been put on hold due to protests from the northern clubs who stood to lose revenue from a smaller fixture list.

New faces to the division include Old Albanians (relegated from National League 1), Bury St Edmunds and Barnes (both promoted from National League 3 London & SE) and Redingensians Rams (promoted from National League 3 South West). The league system is 4 points for a win, 2 points for a draw and additional bonus points being awarded for scoring 4 or more tries and/or losing within 7 points of the victorious team. In terms of promotion the league champions are promoted to National League 1 while the second-placed team play-off against the second-placed team from National League 2 North (at the home ground of the club with the superior league record) for the final promotion place. During the course of the season the two league derby games between the Launceston and Redruth also double up as the Cornish Super Cup with Redruth being the defending 2014–15 champions. Redruth retained the cup, winning the Christmas fixture at the Recreation Ground 17 – 0 before winning away at Polson Bridge 34 – 17 to take the cup 51 – 17 on aggregate.

After a loss-heavy season, Launceston were the first team to be relegated, losing 13 – 19 away to relegation rivals Southend Saxons on the 5 March 2016 with seven games remaining. The remaining relegation places were much more keenly contested with Southend Saxons — who had only just survived the previous season — being the next team to be relegated with three games to go after losing 36 – 15 away to high flying Cambridge. The third and final relegation place fell to Dorking — who had finished 6th the previous season — losing 32 – 20 away to relegation rivals Worthing Raiders in round 29 of the competition, to condemn the Surrey-based club to the drop with one game still to go. Launceston would drop to National League 3 South West while Southend and Dorking would go into National League 3 London & SE.

While the relegation spots were fairly cut and dried, the championship went right to the wire, being keenly contested by two sides — Cambridge and Old Albanian — who were way ahead of the trailing pack. Cambridge ended up the league champions by just two points, after both sides won their last games, having almost blown it the week before by losing their derby fixture against Bury St Edmunds, but managed to claim two bonus points during the defeat. This, combined with Cambridge's home and away victories against Old Albanian, meant that they claimed the title and a return to National League 1 after a three-year absence. After just missing out on the league title, Old Albanian had a second shot at promotion when they hosted the promotion playoff game against 2015–16 National League 2 North runners up, Sedgley Park, with home advantage given due to having the superior league record. Old Albanian proved their class by defeating the northern side, 24 - 0, and returned to the 2016–17 National League 1 after just one year away.

== Structure ==
The league consists of sixteen teams with all the teams playing each other on a home and away basis to make a total of thirty matches each. There is one automatic promotion place, one play-off place and three relegation places. The champions are promoted to the 2016–17 National League 1 and the runners-up play the second-placed team in the 2015–16 National League 2 North with the winner being promoted. The last three teams are relegated to either National League 3 London & SE or National League 3 South West depending on the geographical location of the team (in some cases teams may join the Midlands regional leagues).

== Participating teams and locations ==
Twelve of the teams listed below participated in the 2014–15 National League 2 South season; Old Albanians were relegated from the 2014–15 National League 1, Bury St Edmunds (champions) and Barnes (play-off) were promoted from National League 3 London & SE, Redingensians Rams (champions) were promoted from National League 3 South West.

Locations of the 2015–16 National League 2 South teams

Team	Stadium	Capacity	City/Area	Previous season
Barnes	Barn Elms	500	Barnes, London	Promoted from National 3 London & SE (play-off)
Bishop's Stortford	Silver Leys	1,600	Bishop's Stortford, Hertfordshire	2nd (lost promotion playoff)
Bury St Edmunds	The Haberden	3,000 (135 seats)	Bury St Edmunds, Suffolk	Promoted from National 3 London & SE (1st)
Cambridge	Grantchester Road	2,200 (200 seats)	Cambridge, Cambridgeshire	7th
Canterbury	Merton Lane	1,500 (75 seats)	Canterbury, Kent	11th
Chinnor	Kingsey Road	2,000	Thame, Oxfordshire	6th
Clifton	Station Road	2,200 (200 seats)	Cribbs Causeway, Patchway, Bristol	12th
Dorking	The Big Field	1,000+	Dorking, Surrey	4th
Launceston	Polson Bridge	3,000 (194 seats)	Launceston, Cornwall	10th
Old Albanian	Woollam Playing Fields	1,000	St Albans, Hertfordshire	Relegated from National League 1 (14th)
Old Elthamians	Queen Mary Sports Ground	500	Chislehurst, Kent	8th
Redingensians Rams	Old Bath Road	1,250	Sonning, Reading, Berkshire	Promoted from National 3 SW (1st)
Redruth	Recreation Ground	3,500 (580 seats)	Redruth, Cornwall	9th
Southend Saxons	Warners Park	1,500 (150 seats)	Southend, Essex	13th
Taunton Titans	Hyde Park	2,000 (198 seats)	Taunton, Somerset	3rd
Worthing Raiders	Roundstone Lane	1,500 (100 seats)	Angmering, West Sussex	5th

== League table ==
2015–16 National League 2 South table
Pos	Team	Pld	W	D	L	PF	PA	PD	TB	LB	Pts	Qualification
1	Cambridge (C)	30	25	2	3	1029	532	+497	25	1	130	Promotion place
2	Old Albanian (P)	30	25	1	4	1040	468	+572	23	3	128	Play-off place
3	Bishop's Stortford	30	22	1	7	912	436	+476	21	5	116	
4	Redruth	30	22	1	7	752	547	+205	16	4	110	
5	Taunton Titans	30	20	1	9	896	611	+285	16	5	103	
6	Chinnor	30	13	0	17	802	748	+54	13	8	73	
7	Bury St Edmunds	30	13	0	17	735	753	−18	12	7	71	
8	Redingensians Rams	30	13	1	16	670	746	−76	12	5	71	
9	Old Elthamians	30	13	2	15	669	770	−101	8	6	70	
10	Canterbury	30	13	0	17	700	871	−171	12	6	70	
11	Worthing Raiders	30	13	1	16	636	684	−48	10	5	69	
12	Clifton	30	11	2	17	732	749	−17	12	6	66	
13	Barnes	30	10	4	16	677	827	−150	15	3	66	
14	Dorking (R)	30	10	0	20	598	822	−224	9	7	56	Relegation place
15	Southend Saxons (R)	30	7	3	20	574	845	−271	8	4	46	Relegation place
16	Launceston (R)	30	0	1	29	290	1303	−1013	2	6	5 (Note: Launceston were deducted 5 points for playing an unregistered player against Bury St Edmunds on 19 March 2016.)	Relegation place

Updated to match(es) played on 30 April 2016. Source: "National League 2 South". NCA Rugby.
Rules for classification: If teams are level at any stage, tiebreakers are applied in the following order:
1. Number of matches won
2. Difference between points for and against
3. Total number of points for
4. Aggregate number of points scored in matches between tied teams
5. Number of matches won excluding the first match, then the second and so on until the tie is settled
  Notes:

== Results ==
=== Round 1 ===
5 September 2015
14:00

Redingensians Rams	16 – 37	Redruth (BP)
	Report

Old Bath Road
Attendance: 243
Referee: Dave Miller

5 September 2015
14:30

(BP) Clifton	31 – 18	Worthing Raiders
	Report

Station Road
Attendance: 137
Referee: Calum Howard

5 September 2015
15:00

(BP) Barnes	9 – 10	Canterbury
	Report

Barn Elms
Attendance: 101
Referee: Veryan Boscawen

5 September 2015
15:00

Bury St Edmunds	22 – 41	Bishop's Stortford (BP)
	Report

The Haberden
Attendance: 622
Referee: Luis Caviglia

5 September 2015
15:00

Dorking	14 – 32	Cambridge (BP)
	Report

The Big Field
Attendance: 463
Referee: David Clarkson

5 September 2015
15:00

Launceston	3 – 47	Old Albanian (BP)
	Report

Polson Bridge
Attendance: 490
Referee: Shane Lewis

5 September 2015
15:00

(BP) Southend Saxons	40 – 24	Chinnor (BP)
	Report

Warners Bridge Park
Attendance: 135
Referee: Tom Davis

5 September 2015
15:00

(BP) Taunton Titans	47 - 16	Old Elthamians
	Report

Hyde Park
Attendance: 350
Referee: Adam Leal

=== Round 2 ===
12 September 2015
14:30

(BP) Clifton	53 – 26	Dorking (BP)
	Report

Station Road
Attendance: 237
Referee: Adam Leal

12 September 2015
15:00

Bishop's Stortford	18 – 10	Cambridge
	Report

Silver Leys
Attendance: 900
Referee: Luke Haskins

12 September 2015
15:00

(BP) Canterbury	49 – 10	Launceston
	Report

Merton Lane
Attendance: 303
Referee: Alexis Manley

12 September 2015
15:00

(2BP) Chinnor	22 – 24	Bury St Edmunds (BP)
	Report

Kingsey Road
Attendance: 313
Referee: Andrew MacNeaney

12 September 2015
15:00

(BP) Old Albanian	29 – 19	Redingensians Rams
	Report

Woollam Playing Fields
Attendance: 245
Referee: David Clarkson

12 September 2015
15:00

(BP) Redruth	30 – 17	Southend Saxons
	Report

The Recreation Ground
Attendance: 810
Referee: Calum Howard

12 September 2015
15:00

(BP) Taunton Titans	32 – 27	Barnes (BP)
	Report

Hyde Park
Attendance: 350
Referee: Rob Warburton

12 September 2015
15:00

Worthing Raiders	19 – 16	Old Elthamians (BP)
	Report

Roundstone Lane
Attendance: 522
Referee: Michael Hudson

=== Round 3 ===
19 September 2015
14:00

Redingensians Rams	6 – 20	Canterbury
	Report

Old Bath Road
Attendance: 310
Referee: Michael Hudson

19 September 2015
15:00

Barnes	27 – 35	Worthing Raiders (BP)
	Report

Barn Elms
Attendance: 104
Referee: James O'Sullivan

19 September 2015
15:00

(BP) Bury St Edmunds	22 – 23	Redruth
	Report

The Haberden
Attendance: 425
Referee: Alexis Manley

19 September 2015
15:00

(BP) Cambridge	44 – 20	Chinnor
	Report

Grantchester Road
Attendance: 350
Referee: Luis Caviglia

19 September 2015
15:00

(BP) Dorking	24 – 17	Bishop's Stortford (BP)
	Report

The Big Field
Attendance: 420
Referee: Thomas Davis

19 September 2015
15:00

Launceston	12 – 38	Taunton Titans (BP)
	Report

Polson Bridge
Attendance: 528
Referee: Daniel Parrot

19 September 2015
15:00

(BP) Old Elthamians	45 – 25	Clifton (BP)
	Report

Queen Mary Sports Ground
Attendance: 260
Referee: Andrew MacNeaney

19 September 2015
15:00

(BP) Southend Saxons	29 – 29	Old Albanians (BP)
	Report

Warners Bridge Park
Attendance: 145
Referee: Adam Leal

=== Round 4 ===
26 September 2015
14:30

(BP) Clifton	32 – 24	Barnes
	Report

Station Road
Attendance: 211
Referee: Neil Chivers

26 September 2015
15:00

(BP) Canterbury	25 – 29	Southend Saxons (BP)
	Report

Merton Lane
Attendance: 278
Referee: Andrew MacNeaney

26 September 2015
15:00

Chinnor	20 – 36	Bishop's Stortford (BP)
	Report

Kingsey Road
Attendance: 336
Referee: Gareth Holsgrove

26 September 2015
15:00

(BP) Old Albanian	46 – 11	Bury St Edmunds
	Report

Woollam Playing Fields
Attendance: 325
Referee: Matt Turvey

26 September 2015
15:00

Old Elthamians	24 – 17	Dorking (BP)
	Report

Queen Mary Sports Ground
Attendance: 330
Referee: Robbie Bourke

26 September 2015
15:00

(2BP) Redruth	25 - 27	Cambridge (BP)
	Report

The Recreation Ground
Attendance: 780
Referee: Adam Leal

26 September 2015
15:00

(BP) Taunton Titans	41 – 6	Redingensians Rams
	Report

Hyde Park
Attendance: 450
Referee: Luis Caviglia

26 September 2015
15:00

(BP) Worthing Raiders	46 – 5	Launceston
	Report

Roundstone Lane
Attendance: 612
Referee: Dave Clarkson

=== Round 5 ===
3 October 2015
14:00

(BP) Barnes	32 – 30	Old Elthamians (2BP)
	Report

Barn Elms
Attendance: 150
Referee: David Clarkson

3 October 2015
14:00

(BP) Redingensians Rams	28 – 10	Worthing Raiders
	Report

Old Bath Road
Attendance: 305
Referee: Andrew MacNeaney

3 October 2015
14:30

(BP) Dorking	30 – 27	Chinnor (BP)
	Report

The Big Field
Attendance: 200
Referee: Matt Turvey

3 October 2015
15:00

(BP) Bishop's Stortford	47 – 15	Redruth
	Report

Silver Leys
Attendance: 425
Referee: Mike Hudson

3 October 2015
15:00

(BP) Bury St Edmunds	39 – 10	Canterbury
	Report

The Haberden
Attendance: 510
Referee: Clare Hodnett

3 October 2015
15:00

(BP) Cambridge	29 – 23	Old Albanian (BP)
	Report

Grantchester Road
Attendance: 378
Referee: Calum Howard

3 October 2015
15:00

Launceston	19 – 54	Clifton (BP)
	Report

Polson Bridge
Attendance: 448
Referee: Veryan Boscawen

3 October 2015
15:00

Southend Saxons	19 – 34	Taunton Titans (BP)
	Report

Warners Bridge Park
Attendance: 163
Referee: Adam Leal

=== Round 6 ===
10 October 2015
14:30

(BP) Clifton	41 – 7	Redingensians Rams
	Report

Station Road
Attendance: 180
Referee: Chris Newton

10 October 2015
15:00

(BP) Barnes	37 – 19	Dorking
	Report

Barn Elms
Attendance: 242
Referee: Robbie Bourke

10 October 2015
15:00

Canterbury	17 – 33	Cambridge (BP)
	Report

Merton Lane
Attendance: 193
Referee: David Clarkson

10 October 2015
15:00

Old Albanian	22 – 14	Bishop's Stortford
	Report

Woollam Playing Fields
Attendance: 356
Referee: Thomas Davis

10 October 2015
15:00

(BP) Old Elthamians	49 – 11	Launceston
	Report

Queen Mary Sports Ground
Attendance: 280
Referee: Adam Leal

10 October 2015
15:00

(BP) Redruth	34 – 32	Chinnor (2BP)
	Report

The Recreation Ground
Attendance: 710
Referee: Christophe Ridley

10 October 2015
15:00

(BP) Taunton Titans	26 – 22	Bury St Edmunds (BP)
	Report

Hyde Park
Attendance: 375
Referee: Alexis Manley

10 October 2015
15:00

Worthing Raiders	11 – 20	Southend Saxons
	Report

Roundstone Lane
Attendance: 683
Referee: James Clarke

=== Round 7 ===
17 October 2015
14:15

(BP) Cambridge	32 – 19	Taunton Titans
	Report

Grantchester Road
Attendance: 380
Referee: Matthew Turvey

17 October 2015
14:30

(BP) Dorking	17 – 23	Redruth
	Report

The Big Field
Attendance: 350
Referee: Andrew MacNeaney

17 October 2015
15:00

(BP) Bishop's Stortford	48 – 13	Canterbury
	Report

Silver Leys
Attendance: 365
Referee: Neil Chivers

17 October 2015
15:00

(BP) Bury St Edmunds	25 – 11	Worthing Raiders
	Report

The Haberden
Attendance: 502
Referee: David Clarkson

17 October 2015
15:00

Chinnor	14 – 50	Old Albanian (BP)
	Report

Kingsey Road
Attendance: 223
Referee: Anthony Woodthorpe

17 October 2015
15:00

(2BP) Launceston	31 – 33	Barnes (BP)
	Report

Polson Bridge
Attendance: 392
Referee: Calum Howard

17 October 2015
15:00

(2BP) Redingensians Rams	24 – 27	Old Elthamians
	Report

Old Bath Road
Attendance: 205
Referee: Robbie Bourke

17 October 2015
15:00

(BP) Southend Saxons	34 – 34	Clifton (BP)
	Report

Warners Bridge Park
Attendance: 125
Referee: Claire Hodnett

=== Round 8 ===
24 October 2015
14:00

(BP) Launceston	16 – 20	Dorking
	Report

Polson Bridge
Attendance: 354
Referee: Luke Haskins

24 October 2015
14:00

(BP) Old Albanian	34 – 15	Redruth
	Report

Woollam Playing Fields
Attendance: 412
Referee: Alexis Manley

24 October 2015
14:00

Taunton Titans	20 – 15	Bishop's Stortford (BP)
	Report

Hyde Park
Attendance: 325
Referee: Thomas Davis

24 October 2015
14:30

Clifton	30 – 8	Bury St Edmunds
	Report

Station Road
Attendance: 113
Referee: James Sullivan

24 October 2015
15:00

Barnes	19 – 13	Redingensians Rams (BP)
	Report

Barn Elms
Attendance: 145
Referee: Jack Lewars

24 October 2015
15:00

(BP) Canterbury	11 – 15	Chinnor
	Report

Merton Lane
Attendance: 297
Referee: David Clarkson

24 October 2015
15:00

(BP) Old Elthamians	38 – 29	Southend Saxons (BP)
	Report

Queen Mary Sports Ground
Attendance: 240
Referee: Callum Howard

24 October 2015
15:00

Worthing Raiders	17 – 29	Cambridge (BP)
	Report

Roundstone Lane
Attendance: 415
Referee: Matt Turvey

=== Round 9 ===
7 November 2015
14:00

(BP) Cambridge	38 – 3	Clifton
	Report

Grantchester Road
Attendance: 430
Referee: Alexis Manley

7 November 2015
14:00

Redingensians Rams	30 – 10	Launceston
	Report

Old Bath Road
Attendance: 195
Referee: David Clarkson

7 November 2015
14:30

(BP) Bishop's Stortford	25 – 10	Worthing Raiders
	Report

Silver Leys
Attendance: 310
Referee: Luis Caviglia

7 November 2015
14:30

Dorking	8 – 24	Old Albanian (BP)
	Report

The Big Field
Attendance: 427
Referee: Adam Leal

7 November 2015
14:30

(BP) Redruth	25 – 10	Canterbury
	Report

The Recreation Ground
Attendance: 710
Referee: Daniel Parrott

7 November 2015
14:30

Southend Saxons	23 – 6	Barnes
	Report

Warner Bridge Park
Attendance: 120
Referee: James Sullivan

7 November 2015
15:00

(BP) Bury St Edmunds	17 – 18	Old Elthamians
	Report

The Haberden
Attendance: 344
Referee: James Clarke

7 November 2015
15:00

(BP) Chinnor	23 – 25	Taunton Titans (BP)
	Report

Kingsey Road
Attendance: 289
Referee: Luke Haskins

=== Round 10 ===
14 November 2015
14:00

(BP) Redgensians Rams	19 – 20	Dorking
	Report

Old Bath Road
Attendance: 255
Referee: Anthony Woodthorpe

14 November 2015
14:00

Worthing Raiders	23 – 15	Chinnor
	Report

Roundstone Lane
Attendance: 335
Referee: Luis Caviglia

14 November 2015
14:30

(BP) Barnes	18 – 21	Bury St Edmunds
	Report

Barn Elms
Attendance: 125
Referee: David Clarkson

14 November 2015
14:30

Clifton	20 – 17	Bishop's Stortford (BP)
	Report

Station Road
Attendance: 115
Referee: Rob Warburton

14 November 2015
14:30

Launceston	17 – 17	Southend Saxons
	Report

Polson Bridge
Attendance: 402
Referee: Shane Lewis

14 November 2015
14:30

Old Elthamians	14 – 14	Cambridge
	Report

Queen Mary Sports Ground
Attendance: 180
Referee: Luke Haskins

14 November 2015
15:00

(BP) Canterbury	19 – 23	Old Albanian
	Report

Merton Lane
Attendance: 187
Referee: Alexis Manley

14 November 2015
15:00

Taunton Titans	19 – 16	Redruth (BP)
	Report

Hyde Park
Attendance: 625
Referee: Phillip Davies

=== Round 11 ===
21 November 2015
14:00

(BP) Cambridge	62 – 15	Barnes
	Report

Grantchester Road
Attendance: 439
Referee: Thomas Davis

21 November 2015
14:30

(BP) Bishop's Stortford	26 – 20	Old Elthamians (BP)
	Report

Silver Leys
Attendance: 160
Referee: Graham Ormiston

21 November 2015
14:30

Dorking	16 – 28	Canterbury (BP)
	Report

The Big Field
Attendance: 204
Referee: Luis Caviglia

21 November 2015
14:30

Redruth	24 – 16	Worthing Raiders
	Report

The Recreation Ground
Attendance: 810
Referee: David Clarkson

21 November 2015
14:30

Southend Saxons	12 – 37	Redingensians Rams (BP)
	Report

Warners Bridge Park
Attendance: 168
Referee: Alexis Manley

21 November 2015
15:00

(BP) Bury St Edmunds	29 – 24	Launceston (2BP)
	Report

The Haberden
Attendance: 398
Referee: Calum Howard

21 November 2015
15:00

(BP) Chinnor	31 – 17	Clifton
	Report

Kingsey Road
Attendance: 313
Referee: Philip Davis

21 November 2015
15:00

(BP) Old Albanian	35 – 24	Taunton Titans (BP)
	Report

Wollam Playing Fields
Attendance: 329
Referee: Gareth Holsgrove

=== Round 12 ===
28 November 2015
14:00

(BP) Redingensians Rams	32 – 18	Bury St Edmunds
	Report

Old Bath Road
Attendance: 271
Referee: James Sullivan

28 November 2015
14:00

(BP) Worthing Raiders	24 – 31	Old Albanian (BP)
	Report

Roundstone Lane
Attendance: 343
Referee: James Clarke

28 November 2015
14:30

Barnes	24 – 24	Bishop's Stortford (BP)
	Report

Barn Elms
Attendance: 200
Referee: Luis Caviglia

28 November 2015
14:30

(BP) Clifton	7 – 10	Redruth
	Report

Station Road
Attendance: 180
Referee: Neil Chivers

28 November 2015
14:30

Launceston	8 – 33	Cambridge (BP)
	Report

Polson Bridge
Attendance: 433
Referee: Adam Leal

28 November 2015
14:30

(BP) Old Elthamians	27 – 19	Chinnor
	Report

Queen Mary Sports Ground
Attendance: 185
Referee: Thomas Davies

28 November 2015
14:30

(BP) Southend Saxons	18 – 22	Dorking
	Report

Warners Bridge Park
Attendance: 184
Referee: Mike Hudson

28 November 2015
15:00

(BP) Taunton Titans	68 – 21	Canterbury
	Report

Hyde Park
Attendance: 360
Referee: Alexis Manley

=== Round 13 ===
5 December 2015
14:00

(BP) Bishop's Stortford	50 – 7	Launceston
	Report

Silver Leys
Attendance: 260
Referee: Robbie Bourke

5 December 2015
14:00

(BP) Cambridge	38 – 23	Redingensians Rams (BP)
	Report

Grantchester Road
Attendance: 357
Referee: Alex Manley

5 December 2015
14:00

(BP) Dorking	19 – 22	Taunton Titans
	Report

The Big Field
Attendance: 256
Referee: David Clarkson

5 December 2015
14:00

(BP) Redruth	37 – 13	Old Elthamians
	Report

The Recreation Ground
Attendance: 670
Referee: Luke Haskins

5 December 2015
14:30

(BP) Chinnor	35 – 25	Barnes (BP)
	Report

Kingsey Road
Attendance: 288
Referee: Ben Manning

5 December 2015
15:00

(BP) Bury St Edmunds	16 – 23	Southend Saxons
	Report

The Haberden
Attendance: 408
Referee: Luis Caviglia

5 December 2015
15:00

(BP) Canterbury	20 – 27	Worthing Raiders (BP)
	Report

Merton Lane
Attendance: 189
Referee: Calum Howard

5 December 2015
15:00

(BP) Old Albanian	34 – 5	Clifton
	Report

Woollam Playing Fields
Attendance: 295
Referee: Phil Davies

=== Round 14 ===
12 December 2015
14:00

Old Elthamians	17 – 25	Old Albanian (BP)
	Report

Queen Mary Sports Ground
Attendance: 275
Referee: Claire Hodnett

12 December 2015
14:00

Redingensians Rams	15 – 27	Bishop's Stortford (BP)
	Report

Old Bath Road
Attendance: 278
Referee: Calum Howard

12 December 2015
14:00

Worthing Raiders	28 – 23	Taunton Titans (BP)
	Report

Roundstone Lane
Attendance: 521
Referee: Alexis Manley

12 December 2015
14:30

(BP) Barnes	36 – 31	Redruth (2BP)
	Report

Barn Elms
Attendance: 103
Referee: James Sullivan

12 December 2015
14:30

(BP) Clifton	46 – 31	Canterbury (BP)
	Report

Station Road
Attendance: 123
Referee: Neil Chivers

12 December 2015
14:30

Launceston	10 – 21	Chinnor
	Report

Polson Bridge
Attendance: 515
Referee: Andrew Macneney

12 December 2015
15:00

Bury St Edmunds	17 – 13	Dorking (BP)
	Report

The Haberden
Attendance: 300
Referee: Anthony Woodthorpe

12 December 2015
15:00

Southend Saxons	11 – 33	Cambridge (BP)
	Report

Warners Bridge Park
Attendance: 207
Referee: Robert Warburton

=== Round 15 ===
19 December 2015
14:00

(BP) Bishop's Stortford	28 – 15	Southend Saxons
	Report

Silver Leys
Attendance: 562
Referee: David Conway

19 December 2015
14:00

(BP) Cambridge	27 – 10	Bury St Edmunds
	Report

Grantchester Road
Attendance: 915
Referee: Veryan Boscawen

19 December 2015
14:00

(BP) Dorking	31 – 26	Worthing Raiders (2BP)
	Report

The Big Field
Attendance: 241
Referee: Adam Leal

19 December 2015
14:00

Redruth	17 – 0 (Note: First leg of 2015-16 Cornish Super Cup.)	Launceston
	Report

The Recreation Ground
Attendance: 1,050
Referee: Anthony Woodthorpe

19 December 2015
14:30

(2BP) Chinnor	39 – 41	Redingensians Rams (BP)
	Report

Kingsey Road
Attendance: 515
Referee: Luke Haskins

19 December 2015
15:00

Canterbury	20 – 9	Old Elthamians
	Report

Merton Lane
Attendance: 325
Referee: Andrew MacNeaney

19 December 2015
15:00

(BP) Old Albanian	25 – 7	Barnes
	Report

Woollam Playing Fields
Attendance: 295
Referee: Matt Turvey

19 December 2015
15:00

Taunton Titans	22 – 7	Clifton
	Report

Hyde Park
Attendance: 475
Referee: Daniel Parrott

=== Round 16 ===
2 January 2016
14:00

Barnes	20 – 15	Taunton Titans (BP)
	Report

Barn Elms
Attendance: 72
Referee: Adam Leal

2 January 2016
14:00

Cambridge	12 – 29	Bishop's Stortford (BP)
	Report

Grantchester Road
Attendance: 700
Referee: Claire Hodnett

2 January 2016
14:00

(BP) Dorking	31 – 29	Clifton (2BP)
	Report

The Big Field
Attendance: 201
Referee: Alex Thomas

2 January 2016
14:00

Old Elthamians	19 – 13	Worthing Raiders (BP)
	Report

Queen Mary Sports Ground
Attendance: 282
Referee: Luis Caviglia

2 January 2016
14:00

Redingensians Rams	21 – 31	Old Albanian (BP)
	Report

Old Bath Road
Attendance: 283
Referee: Anthony Woodthorpe

2 January 2016

Launceston	P – P	Canterbury

- Postponed due to adverse weather conditions. Game rescheduled to 27 February 2016.

2 January 2016
15:00

Bury St Edmunds	24 – 20	Chinnor (BP)
	Report

The Haberden
Attendance: 513
Referee: David Clarkson

3 January 2016
14:00

Southend Saxons	10 – 21	Redruth
	Report

Warners Bridge Park
Attendance: 165
Referee: Robbie Bourke

=== Round 17 ===
9 January 2016
14:00

(BP) Bishop's Stortford	41 – 10	Dorking
	Report

Silver Leys
Attendance: 390
Referee: Andrew MacNeaney

9 January 2016
14:00

Redruth	22 – 8	Bury St Edmunds
	Report

The Recreation Ground
Attendance: 610
Referee: Sara Cox

9 January 2016
14:00

Worthing Raiders	24 – 24	Barnes (BP)
	Report

Roundstone Lane
Attendance: 431
Referee: David Clarkson

9 January 2016
14:30

(BP) Chinnor	19 – 26	Cambridge (BP)
	Report

Kingsey Road
Attendance: 213
Referee: Phil Davies

9 January 2016
14:30

(BP) Clifton	16 – 20	Old Elthamians
	Report

Station Road
Attendance: 101
Referee: Luke Haskins

9 January 2016
15:00

Canterbury	27 – 23	Redingensians Rams (BP)
	Report

Merton Lane
Attendance: 287
Referee: Luis Caviglia

9 January 2016
15:00

(BP) Old Albanian	62 – 10	Southend Saxons
	Report

Woollam Playing Fields
Attendance: 378
Referee: James Clarke

9 January 2016
15:00

Taunton Titans	P – P	Launceston

- Postponed due to unplayable pitch caused by heavy rain. Game rescheduled to 12 March 2016.

=== Round 18 ===
16 January 2016
14:00

(BP) Barnes	27 – 25	Clifton (BP)
	Report

Barn Elms
Attendance: 201
Referee: Robbie Bourke

16 January 2016
14:00

(BP) Bishop's Stortford	36 – 8	Chinnor
	Report

Silver Leys
Attendance: 351
Referee: Adam Leal

16 January 2016
14:00

(BP) Cambridge	29 – 27	Redruth (2BP)
	Report

Grantchester Road
Attendance: 369
Referee: Matt Turvey

16 January 2016
14:00

(BP) Dorking	20 – 22	Old Elthamians
	Report

The Big Field
Attendance: 425
Referee: Calum Howard

16 January 2016
14:00

Redingensians Rams	14 – 40	Taunton Titans (BP)
	Report

Old Bath Road
Attendance: 225
Referee: Andrew MacNeaney

16 January 2016
14:30

Launceston	5 – 38	Worthing Raiders (BP)
	Report

Polson Bridge
Attendance: 657
Referee: Claire Hodnett

16 January 2016
15:00

Bury St Edmunds	12 – 31	Old Albanian (BP)
	Report

The Haberden
Attendance: 480
Referee: Neil Chivers

16 January 2016
15:30

Southend Saxons	14 – 31	Canterbury (BP)
	Report

Warners Bridge Park
Attendance: 147
Referee: Alexis Manley

=== Round 19 ===
23 January 2016
14:00

Old Elthamians	17 – 17	Barnes
	Report

Queen Mary Sports Ground
Attendance: 237
Referee: Anthony Woodthorpe

23 January 2016
14:00

Redruth	5 – 0	Bishop's Stortford (BP)
	Report

The Recreation Ground
Attendance: 810
Referee: Luke Haskins

23 January 2016
14:00

Worthing Raiders	22 – 20	Redingensians Rams (BP)
	Report

Roundstone Lane
Attendance: 461
Referee: Calum Howard

23 January 2016
14:30

Chinnor	23 – 19	Dorking (BP)
	Report

Kingsey Road
Attendance: 313
Referee: Andrew MacNeaney

23 January 2016
14:30

(BP) Clifton	50 – 15	Launceston
	Report

Station Road
Attendance: 120
Referee: Luis Caviglia

23 January 2016
15:00

(BP) Canterbury	34 – 33	Bury St Edmunds (2BP)
	Report

Merton Lane
Attendance: 347
Referee: Robbie Bourke

23 January 2016
15:00

(2BP) Old Albanian	24 – 26	Cambridge (BP)
	Report

Woollam Playing Fields
Attendance: 480
Referee: Daniel Parrott

23 January 2016
15:00

(BP) Taunton Titans	50 – 7	Southend Saxons
	Report

Hyde Park
Attendance: 360
Referee: Sara Cox

=== Round 20 ===
30 January 2016
14:00

Bishop's Stortford	20 – 16	Old Albanian (BP)
	Report

Silver Leys
Attendance: 680
Referee: Rob Warburton

30 January 2016
14:00

(BP) Cambridge	62 – 10	Canterbury
	Report

Grantchester Road
Attendance: 420
Referee: Anthony Woodthorpe

30 January 2016
14:00

Dorking	15 – 29	Barnes (BP)
	Report

The Big Field
Attendance: 490
Referee: David Conway

30 January 2016
14:00

Redingensians Rams	20 – 11	Clifton
	Report

Old Bath Road
Attendance: 276
Referee: David Clarkson

30 January 2016
14:30

Chinnor	13 – 26	Redruth (BP)
	Report

Kingsey Road
Attendance: 193
Referee: Luis Caviglia

30 January 2016
14:30

(BP) Launceston	17 – 20	Old Elthamians
	Report

Polson Bridge
Attendance: 428
Referee: Calum Howard

30 January 2016
15:00

Bury St Edmunds	24 – 34	Taunton Titans (BP)
	Report

The Haberden
Attendance: 435
Referee: Claire Hodnett

30 January 2016
15:00

Southend Saxons	25 – 10	Worthing Raiders
	Report

Warners Bridge Park
Attendance: 187
Referee: Robbie Bourke

=== Round 21 ===
6 February 2016
14:00

(BP) Barnes	40 – 0	Launceston
	Report

Barn Elms
Attendance: 75
Referee: Adam Leal

6 February 2016
14:00

Old Elthamians	18 – 42	Redingensians Rams (BP)
	Report

Queen Mary Sports Ground
Attendance: 234
Referee: Robert Warburton

6 February 2016
14:00

Redruth	P – P	Dorking

- Postponed due to heavy rain and high winds. Game rescheduled to 27 February 2016.

6 February 2016
14:00

Worthing Raiders	27 – 23	Bury St Edmunds (BP)
	Report

Roundstone Lane
Attendance: 365
Referee: Anthony Woodthorpe

6 February 2016
14:30

Clifton	P – P	Southend Saxons

- Postponed due to waterlogged pitch caused by heavy rain. Game rescheduled to 27 February 2016.

6 February 2016
15:00

Canterbury	14 – 26	Bishop's Stortford (BP)
	Report

Merton Lane
Attendance: 276
Referee: Alexis Manley

6 February 2016
15:00

Old Albanian	5 – 17	Chinnor
	Report

Woollam Playing Fields
Attendance: 322
Referee: Phil Davies

6 February 2016
15:00

Taunton Titans	P – P	Cambridge

- Postponed due to waterlogged pitch caused by heavy rain. Game rescheduled to 27 February 2016.

=== Round 22 ===
13 February 2016
14:00

(BP) Bishop's Stortford	22 – 26	Taunton Titans (BP)
	Report

Silver Leys
Attendance: 305
Referee: Thomas Davis

13 February 2016
14:00

(BP) Cambridge	28 – 22	Worthing Raiders (2BP)
	Report

Grantchester Road
Attendance: 410
Referee: Gareth Holsgrove

13 February 2016
14:00

Dorking	11 – 8	Launceston (BP)
	Report

The Big Field
Attendance: 275
Referee: Robert Bourke

13 February 2016
14:00

Redingensians Rams	23 – 13	Barnes
	Report

Old Bath Road
Attendance: 221
Referee: Calum Sharp

13 February 2016
14:30

Redruth	P – P	Old Albanian

- Postponed due to unplayable pitch caused by heavy rain. Game rescheduled to 12 March 2016.

13 February 2016
15:00

(BP) Bury St Edmunds	32 – 20	Clifton
	Report

The Haberden
Attendance: 447
Referee: Calum Howard

13 February 2016
15:00

(BP) Chinnor	39 – 26	Canterbury (BP)
	Report

Kingsey Road
Attendance: 222
Referee: David Clarkson

13 February 2016
15:00

(BP) Southend Saxons	9 – 14	Old Elthamians
	Report

Warners Bridge Park
Attendance: 132
Referee: Adam Leal

=== Round 23 ===
20 February 2016
14:00

(BP) Old Elthamians	21 – 23	Bury St Edmunds

Queen Mary Sports Ground
Attendance: 242
Referee: David Clarkson

20 February 2016
14:00

(BP) Worthing Raiders	29 – 15	Bishop's Stortford
	Report

Roundstone Lane
Attendance: 486
Referee: Andrew Macneaney

20 February 2016
14:30

Clifton	8 – 16	Cambridge
	Report

Station Road
Attendance: 217
Referee: Rob Warburton

20 February 2016
14:30

Launceston	0 – 34	Redingensians Rams (BP)
	Report

Polson Bridge
Attendance: 664
Referee: Christophe Ridley

20 February 2016
15:00

Barnes	21 – 15	Southend Saxons (BP)
	Report

Barn Elms
Attendance: 87
Referee: Thomas Davis

20 February 2016
15:00

(BP) Canterbury	5 – 7	Redruth
	Report

Merton Lane
Attendance: 307
Referee: Gareth Holsgrove

20 February 2016
15:00

Old Albanian	19 – 6	Dorking
	Report

Woollam Playing Fields
Attendance: 329
Referee: Shane Lewis

20 February 2016
15:00

Taunton Titans	15 – 26	Chinnor (BP)
	Report

Hyde Park
Attendance: 325
Referee: Adam Leal

=== Rounds 16 & 21 (rescheduled games) ===
27 February 2016
14:00

(BP) Redruth	46 – 20	Dorking
	Report

The Recreation Ground
Attendance: 701
Referee: Calum Howard

- Game rescheduled from 6 February 2016.

27 February 2016
14:30

(BP) Clifton	38 – 26	Southend Saxons (BP)
	Report

Station Road
Attendance: 135
Referee: Thomas Davis

- Game rescheduled from 6 February 2016.

27 February 2016
15:00

Launceston	12 – 39	Canterbury (BP)
	Report

Polson Bridge
Attendance: 397
Referee: Adam Leal

- Game rescheduled from 2 January 2016.

27 February 2016
15:00

(BP) Taunton Titans	15 – 21	Cambridge
	Report

Hyde Park
Attendance: 250
Referee: Daniel Parrott

- Game rescheduled from 6 February 2016.

=== Round 24 ===
5 March 2016
14:30

(BP) Bishop's Stortford	26 – 3	Clifton
	Report

Silver Leys
Attendance: 270
Referee: Luis Caviglia

5 March 2016
14:30

(BP) Dorking	7 – 13	Redingensians Rams
	Report

The Big Field
Attendance: 335
Referee: Claire Hodnett

5 March 2016
15:00

(BP) Bury St Edmunds	35 – 26	Barnes (BP)
	Report

The Haberden
Attendance: 394
Referee: James Clarke

5 March 2016
15:00

(BP) Cambridge	24 – 21	Old Elthamians (BP)
	Report

Grantchester Road
Attendance: 410
Referee: Phillip Davies

5 March 2016
15:00

(BP) Chinnor	38 – 8	Worthing Raiders
	Report

Kingsey Road
Attendance: 303
Referee: Robbie Bourke

5 March 2016
15:00

(BP) Old Albanian	71 – 17	Canterbury
	Report

Woollam Playing Fields
Attendance: 378
Referee: Thomas Davis

5 March 2016
15:00

(BP) Redruth	38 – 3	Taunton Titans
	Report

The Recreation Ground
Attendance: 921
Referee: Shane Lewis

5 March 2016
15:00

Southend Saxons	19 – 13	Launceston (BP)
	Report

Warners Bridge Park
Attendance: 93
Referee: Andrew MacNeaney

- Launceston are relegated.

=== Rounds 17 & 22 (rescheduled games) ===
12 March 2016
14:00

Redruth	18 – 29	Old Albanian (BP)
	Report

The Recreation Ground
Attendance: 690
Referee: Phillip Davies

- Game rescheduled from 13 February 2016.

12 March 2016
14:00

(BP) Taunton Titans	76 – 5	Launceston
	Report

Hyde Park
Attendance: 325
Referee: Gareth Holsgrove

- Game rescheduled from 9 January 2016.

=== Round 25 ===
19 March 2016
14:00

Old Elthamians	5 – 43	Bishop's Stortford (BP)
	Report

Queen Mary Sports Ground
Attendance: 138
Referee: Robbie Bourke

19 March 2016
14:30

Clifton	29 – 26	Chinnor (BP)
	Report

Station Road
Attendance: 243
Referee: Alexis Manley

19 March 2016
14:30

Launceston	0 – 79	Bury St Edmunds (BP)
	Report

Polson Bridge
Attendance: 390
Referee: David Clarkson

19 March 2016
14:30

(BP) Redingensians Rams	26 – 21	Southend Saxons (BP)
	Report

Old Bath Road
Attendance: 312
Referee: Calum Howard

19 March 2016
15:00

(BP) Barnes	36 – 36	Cambridge (BP)
	Report

Barn Elms
Attendance: 100
Referee: Thomas Davies

19 March 2016
15:00

(BP) Canterbury	52 – 39	Dorking (BP)
	Report

Merton Lane
Attendance: 423
Referee: Luis Caviglia

19 March 2016
15:00

(BP) Taunton Titans	21 – 26	Old Albanian
	Report

Hyde Park
Attendance: 375
Referee: Shane Lewis

19 March 2016
15:00

(BP) Worthing Raiders	8 – 10	Redruth
	Report

Roundstone Lane
Attendance: 465
Referee: James Clarke

=== Round 26 ===
2 April 2016
15:00

(BP) Bishop's Stortford	43 – 10	Barnes
	Report

Silver Leys
Attendance: 470
Referee: David Conway

2 April 2016
15:00

(2BP) Bury St Edmunds	28 – 31	Redingensians Rams (BP)
	Report

The Haberden
Attendance: 602
Referee: Alex Thomas

2 April 2016
15:00

(BP) Cambridge	109 – 0	Launceston
	Report

Grantchester Road
Attendance: 460
Referee: William Halford

2 April 2016
15:00

(BP) Canterbury	25 – 21	Taunton Titans (BP)
	Report

Merton Lane
Attendance: 532
Referee: Calum Howard

2 April 2016
15:00

(BP) Chinnor	39 – 31	Old Elthamians (BP)
	Report

Kingsey Road
Attendance: 397
Referee: Jack Lewars

2 April 2016
15:00

(BP) Dorking	39 – 26	Southend Saxons (BP)
	Report

The Big Field
Attendance: 425
Referee: Luke Haskins

2 April 2016
15:00

(BP) Old Albanian	27 – 3	Worthing Raiders
	Report

Woollam Playing Fields
Attendance: 286
Referee: Dave Clarkson

2 April 2016
15:00

(BP) Redruth	27 – 16	Clifton
	Report

The Recreation Ground
Attendance: 621
Referee: Luis Caviglia

=== Round 27 ===
9 April 2016
14:00

Redingensians Rams	12 – 33	Cambridge (BP)
	Report

Old Bath Road
Attendance: 295
Referee: Robbie Bourke

9 April 2016
14:30

Clifton	10 – 39	Old Albanian (BP)
	Report

Station Road
Attendance: 240
Referee: Adam Leal

9 April 2016
15:00

Barnes	0 – 36	Chinnor (BP)
	Report

Barn Elms
Attendance: 95
Referee: David Clarkson

9 April 2016
15:00

Launceston	7 – 56	Bishop's Stortford (BP)
	Report

Polson Bridge
Attendance: 288
Referee: Anthony Woodthorpe

9 April 2016
15:00

(BP) Old Elthamians	25 – 44	Redruth (BP)
	Report

Queen Mary Sports Ground
Attendance: 168
Referee: Andrew MacNeaney

9 April 2016
15:00

Southend Saxons	15 – 27	Bury St Edmunds (BP)
	Report

Warners Bridge Park
Attendance: 132
Referee: Alexis Manley

9 April 2016
15:00

(BP) Taunton Titans	33 – 24	Dorking (BP)
	Report

Hyde Park
Attendance: 325
Referee: Gareth Holsgrove

9 April 2016
15:00

(BP) Worthing Raiders	41 - 24	Canterbury (BP)
	Report

Roundstone Lane
Attendance: 781
Referee: Phillip Davis

=== Round 28 ===
16 April 2016
15:00

(BP) Bishop's Stortford	53 – 5	Redingensians Rams
	Report

Silver Leys
Attendance: 450
Referee: Andrew MacNeaney

16 April 2016
15:00

(BP) Cambridge	36 – 15	Southend Saxons
	Report

Grantchester Road
Attendance: 420
Referee: Thomas Davis

- Southend Saxons are relegated.

16 April 2016
15:00

(BP) Canterbury	34 – 27	Clifton (2BP)
	Report

Merton Lane
Attendance: 375
Referee: Veryan Boscawen

16 April 2016
15:00

(BP) Chinnor	75 – 3	Launceston
	Report

Kingsey Road
Attendance: 289
Referee: Adam Leal

16 April 2016
15:00

(BP) Dorking	27 – 14	Bury St Edmunds
	Report

The Big Field
Attendance: 535
Referee: Anthony Woodthorpe

16 April 2016
15:00

(BP) Old Albanian	46 – 20	Old Elthamians
	Report

Woollam Playing Fields
Attendance: 392
Referee: Calum Howard

16 April 2016
15:00

(BP) Redruth	32 – 18	Barnes
	Report

The Recreation Ground
Attendance: 924
Referee: Robert Bourke

16 April 2016
15:00

Taunton Titans	30 – 12	Worthing Raiders
	Report

Hyde Park
Attendance: 525
Referee: Neil Chivers

=== Round 29 ===
23 April 2016
14:00

(BP) Redingensians Rams	37 – 21	Chinnor
	Report

Old Bath Road
Attendance: 359
Referee: Jack Lewars

23 April 2016
14:30

Clifton	19 – 19	Taunton Titans
	Report

Station Road
Attendance: 189
Referee: Hamish Smales

23 April 2016
15:00

(BP) Barnes	26 – 47	Old Albanian (BP)

Barn Elms
Attendance: 253
Referee: Veryan Boscawen

23 April 2016
15:00

(BP) Bury St Edmunds	43 – 38	Cambridge (2BP)
	Report

The Haberden
Attendance: 997
Referee: Luis Caviglia

23 April 2016
15:00

Launceston	17 – 34 (Note: Second leg of 2015-16 Cornish Super Cup. Redruth win 51-17 on aggregate to retain the cup.)	Redruth (BP)
	Report

Polson Bridge
Attendance: 882
Referee: Calum Howard

23 April 2016
15:00

Old Elthamians	22 – 17	Canterbury (BP)
	Report

Queen Mary Sports Ground
Attendance: 238
Referee: Andrew MacNeaney

23 April 2016
15:00

Southend Saxons	0 – 28	Bishop's Stortford (BP)
	Report

Warners Bridge Park
Attendance: 287
Referee: Daniel Conway

23 April 2016
15:00

(BP) Worthing Raiders	32 – 20	Dorking
	Report

Roundstone Lane
Attendance: 933
Referee: James Sullivan

- Dorking are relegated.

=== Round 30 ===
30 April 2016
15:00

(BP) Bishop's Stortford	41 – 29	Bury St Edmunds (BP)
	Report

Silver Leys
Attendance: 780
Referee: Claire Hodnett

30 April 2016
15:00

(BP) Cambridge	52 – 14	Dorking
	Report

Grantchester Road
Attendance: 1,145
Referee: Calum Howard

30 April 2016
15:00

(BP) Canterbury	41 – 31	Barnes (BP)
	Report

Merton Lane
Attendance: 421
Referee: David Collins

30 April 2016
15:00

(BP) Chinnor	45 – 26	Southend Saxons (BP)
	Report

Kingsey Road
Attendance: 273
Referee: Rob Warburton

30 April 2016
15:00

(BP) Old Albanian	90 – 3	Launceston
	Report

Woollam Playing Fields
Attendance: 410
Referee: Gareth Holsgrove

30 April 2016
15:00

(2BP) Old Elthamians	31 – 38	Taunton Titans (BP)
	Report

Queen Mary Sports Ground
Attendance: 132
Referee: Luis Caviglia

30 April 2016
15:00

(BP) Redruth	33 – 33	Redingensians Rams (BP)
	Report

The Recreation Ground
Attendance: 1,120
Referee: David Clarkson

30 April 2016
15:00

(BP) Worthing Raiders	27 – 26	Clifton (2BP)
	Report

Roundstone Lane
Attendance: 546
Referee: Anthony Woodthorpe

=== Promotion play-off ===
Each season, the runners-up in the National League 2 South and National League 2 North participate in a play-off for promotion to National Division 1. Old Albanian having the best record hosted the match against the north runner-up, Sedgley Park.

Team	Pld	W	D	L	PF	PA	PD	TB	LB	Pts
Old Albanian (P)	30	25	1	4	1040	468	+572	23	3	128
Sedgley Park	30	21	0	9	951	562	+389	18	6	108

(P) Promoted

14 May 2016
14:30

Old Albanian	24 – 0	Sedgley Park

Woollam Playing Fields
Attendance: 473
Referee: Gareth Holsgrove

== Attendances ==
- Does not include promotion play-off.

Club	Home Games	Total	Average	Highest	Lowest	% Capacity
Barnes	15	2,053	137	253	72	27%
Bishop's Stortford	15	6,678	445	900	160	28%
Bury St Edmunds	15	7,377	492	997	300	16%
Cambridge	15	7,583	506	1,145	350	23%
Canterbury	15	4,740	316	532	187	21%
Chinnor	15	4,480	299	515	193	15%
Clifton	15	2,541	169	243	101	8%
Dorking	15	5,247	350	535	200	35%
Launceston	15	7,268	485	882	288	16%
Old Albanian	15	5,232	349	480	245	35%
Old Elthamians	15	3,421	228	330	132	46%
Redingensians Rams	15	4,033	269	359	195	22%
Redruth	15	11,937	796	1,120	610	23%
Southend Saxons	15	2,390	159	287	93	11%
Taunton Titans	15	5,795	386	625	250	19%
Worthing Raiders	15	7,899	527	933	335	35%

== Individual statistics ==
- Note that points scorers includes tries as well as conversions, penalties and drop goals. Appearance figures also include coming on as substitutes (unused substitutes not included). Does not include promotion playoff.

=== Top points scorers ===
Rank	Player	Team	Appearances	Points
1	(England) Gary Kingdom	Taunton Titans	29	283
2	(England) Tom O'Toole	Barnes	28	240
3	(England) Tom White	Old Elthamians	28	234
4	(England) Bradley Burr	Southend Saxons	30	200
5	(England) James Stokes	Cambridge	28	184
6	(England) Matt Noble	Dorking	23	182
7	(England) Max Malins	Old Albanian	14	166
7	(South Africa) Gerhard Boshoff	Cambridge	29	166
8	(England) Tom Best	Worthing Raiders	27	163
9	(England) James Mackay	Clifton	19	161

=== Top try scorers ===
Rank	Player	Team	Appearances	Tries
1	(England) Albert Portsmouth	Cambridge	30	31
2	(England) Oscar Heath	Chinnor	20	24
3	(England) James Stokes	Cambridge	28	20
3	(England) Nick Hankin	Bishop's Stortford	30	20
4	(England) Michael Allan	Old Albanian	22	19
5	(New Zealand) Mason Rosvall	Canterbury	27	18
5	(England) Lawrence Hutchinson	Cambridge	29	18
6	(England) Michael Ayrton	Cambridge	28	17
6	(England) Craig Dowsett	Old Elthamians	29	17
7	(England) Nick Mason	Taunton Titans	23	16

== Season records ==
=== Team ===
Largest home win — 109 pts

109 - 0 Cambridge at home to Launceston on 2 April 2016

Largest away win — 79 pts

79 - 0 Bury St Edmunds away to Launceston on 19 March 2016

Most points scored — 79 pts

79 - 0 Bury St Edmunds away to Launceston on 19 March 2016

Most tries in a match — 17

Cambridge at home to Launceston on 2 April 2016

Most conversions in a match — 12

Cambridge at home to Launceston on 2 April 2016

Most penalties in a match — 5 (x3)

Worthing Raiders at home to Taunton Titans on 12 December 2015
Canterbury at home to Redingensians Rams on 9 January 2016
Old Elthamians at home to Canterbury on 23 April 2016

Most drop goals in a match — 1

N/A - multiple teams

=== Player ===
Most points in a match — 30

(England) Oscar Heath for Chinnor at home to Southend Saxons on 30 April 2016

Most tries in a match — 5 (x2)

(England) Nick Mason for Taunton Titans at home to Launceston on 12 March 2016
(England) Michael Ayrton for Cambridge at home to Launceston on 2 April 2016

Most conversions in a match — 12

(South Africa) Gerhard Boshoff for Cambridge at home to Launceston on 2 April 2016

Most penalties in a match — 5 (x2)

(Wales) Matthew McLean for Worthing Raiders at home to Taunton Titans on 12 December 2015
(England) Tom Best for Canterbury at home to Redingensians Rams on 9 January 2016
(England) Tom White for Old Elthamians at home to Canterbury on 23 April 2016

Most drop goals in a match — 1

N/A - multiple players

=== Attendances ===
Highest — 1,145

Cambridge at home to Dorking on 30 April 2016

Lowest — 72

Barnes at home to Taunton Titans on 2 January 2016

Highest Average Attendance — 796

Redruth

Lowest Average Attendance — 129

Barnes

== See also ==
- English rugby union system
- Rugby union in England
