= 2019–20 National League 2 North =

Rugby union competition in England

- Countries: England
- Date: September 2019 – 14 March 2020
- Champions: Caldy (2nd title)
- Relegated: Scunthorpe
- Matches played: 199
- Attendance: 69,282 (average 348 per match)
- Highest attendance: 1,059; Fylde v Preston Grasshoppers; 14 September 2019
- Lowest attendance: 110 (3); Scunthorpe v Luctonians; 23 November 2019; Scunthorpe v Loughborough Students; 7 March 2020; Scunthorpe v Chester; 14 March 2020
- Top point scorer: (Wales) Gavin Roberts (Caldy); 269 points
- Top try scorer: (England) Dan Rundle (Stourbridge); 30 tries

The 2019–20 National League 2 North was the eleventh season (33rd overall) of the fourth tier (north) of the English domestic rugby union competitions since the professionalised format of the second division was introduced.

On 22 February Scunthorpe were the first side to be relegated after suffering a 109–12 defeat against Chester, going down with eight games still to play. Scunthorpe had suffered the loss of their player, James Walker, who died earlier in the season. On 7 March Caldy became champions with a 49–5 win away to relegation threatened Preston Grasshoppers to seal an instant return to National League 1 and claim their second National League 2 North title.

Due to the COVID-19 pandemic in the United Kingdom, the Rugby Football Union officially cancelled the season on 20 March 2020, after an initial postponement of all rugby in England including training. After the cancellation was announced the RFU used a best playing record formula to decide the final table. With Caldy already promoted, Fylde claimed the runners up spot but missed out on promotion as the 2019–20 National League 2 South runner up, Tonbridge Juddian had a better comparative league record and went up instead (the playoff had been cancelled). Joining Scunthorpe in the relegation spots were Preston Grasshoppers and Otley. Although Preston were as good as down by the time the leagues were suspended, Otley were in a real battle against Luctonians, and will feel hard done by. Scunthorpe will drop to Midlands Premier while Otley and Preston Grasshoppers will drop to North Premier. For Otley, once a second tier club, the drop to the regional leagues will be the lowest level they have played at since the 1990s.

The league was an interesting one in terms of National League 2 North records, included records that might have been achieved had the full 30 games been played. For instance, Caldy, with 25 wins out of 25 were looking to break the record of 28 wins (out of 30) set by Hull Ionians in the 2012–13 season. They may also have shattered the 134 point record set by Ionians during the 2014–15 season with a maximum of 144 achievable. A club record that were achieved despite the premature ending were the 4 draws achieved by Huddersfield (breaking the record of 3 set by numerous teams), while Caldys Gavin Roberts, in finishing as league top scorer for the second time in his career, tied a record set by a number of other players such as the prolific Chris Johnson. Stourbridge's Dan Rundle, finishing as top try scorer with 30 tries would likely have beating the existing record of 32 tries in a season (set several times by Nick Royle).

While Caldy had been looking to break records, Scunthorpe were looking to avoid making any of their own. Although the early end of the season meant they wouldn't equal the 30 games lost by Manchester and Dudley Kingswinford in the 2010–11 and 2013–14 seasons respectively, the club's relegation was their third from the division - equalling Morley and Sheffield. A final record that was set was the league average league attendance which reached an all time divisional high of 348, helped by good regular attendances at the likes of Fylde, Hinckley and Wharfedale. This was the first time in recent seasons that the National League North average attendances trumped those in National League South.

== Structure ==
The league consists of sixteen teams with all the teams playing each other on a home and away basis to make a total of thirty matches each. There is one automatic promotion place, one play-off place and three relegation places. The champions are promoted to the 2020–21 National League 1 and the runners up play the second-placed team in the 2019–20 National League 2 South with the winner also being promoted. The last three teams are relegated to either North Premier or Midlands Premier depending on the geographical location of the team (in some cases teams may join the southern regional leagues).

The results of the matches contribute points to the league as follows:

- 4 points are awarded for a win
- 2 points are awarded for a draw
- 0 points are awarded for a loss, however
- 1 losing (bonus) point is awarded to a team that loses a match by 7 points or fewer
- 1 additional (bonus) point is awarded to a team scoring 4 tries or more in a match.

== Participating teams and locations ==
Locations of the 2019–20 National League 2 North teams

Eleven of the teams listed below participated in the 2018–19 National League 2 North season. The 2018–19 champions, Hull Ionians, were promoted into the 2019–20 National League 1, replacing Caldy and Loughborough Students who were relegated from the 2018–19 National League 1. The three teams relegated from National League 2 North the previous season were Peterborough Lions and South Leicester (both Midlands Premier) and Macclesfield (North Premier).

The promoted teams include Scunthorpe (champions) and Luctonians (play-offs) from Midlands Premier, while Hull come up as champions of North Premier. In order to address an imbalance of teams, Leicester Lions have been level transferred to the 2019–20 National League 2 South as the most appropriate located team in terms of access to the southern sides.

Team	Ground	Capacity	City/Area	Previous season
Caldy	Paton Field	4,000	Thurstaston, Wirral, Merseyside	Relegated from National 1 (14th)
Chester	Hare Lane	2,000 (500 seats)	Chester, Cheshire	Runners up (lost play-off)
Fylde	Woodlands Memorial Ground	7,500 (500 seats)	Lytham St. Annes, Lancashire	6th
Hinckley	De Montfort Park	2,000	Hinckley, Leicestershire	10th
Huddersfield	Lockwood Park	1,500 (500 seats)	Huddersfield, West Yorkshire	4th
Hull	Ferens Ground	1,500 (288 seats)	Kingston upon Hull, East Riding of Yorkshire	Promoted from North Premier (champions)
Loughborough Students	East Park (Note: Since relegation from the 2018–19 National League 1 Loughborough Students have switched games from the Loughborough University Stadium to nearby East Park.)	1,000	Loughborough, Leicestershire	Relegated from National 1 (16th)
Luctonians	Mortimer Park	2,500 (300 seats)	Kingsland, Herefordshire	Promoted from Midlands Premier (play-off)
Otley	Cross Green	7,000 (852 seats)	Otley, Leeds, West Yorkshire	9th
Preston Grasshoppers	Lightfoot Green	2,250 (250 seats)	Preston, Lancashire	7th
Scunthorpe	Heslam Park	1,212 (212 seats)	Scunthorpe, Lincolnshire	Promoted from Midlands Premier (champions)
Sedgley Park	Park Lane	3,000	Whitefield, Bury, Greater Manchester	3rd
Sheffield Tigers	Dore Moor	1,000	Sheffield, South Yorkshire	13th
Stourbridge	Stourton Park	3,500 (499 seats)	Stourbridge, West Midlands	11th
Tynedale	Tynedale Park	2,000 (400 seats)	Corbridge, Northumberland	5th
Wharfedale	The Avenue	2,000	Threshfield, North Yorkshire	8th

== Tables ==
At the date the leagues were suspended, the National League 2 North table read as follows:

2019–20 National League 2 North table (to the date when play stopped due to COVID-19)
Pos	Team	Pld	W	D	L	PF	PA	PD	TB	LB	Pts
1	Caldy (C)	25	25	0	0	1002	279	+723	19	0	119
2	Fylde	25	17	1	7	790	447	+343	16	4	90
3	Hinckley	25	17	0	8	634	461	+173	12	5	85
4	Sedgley Park	25	17	0	8	627	549	+78	11	4	83
5	Loughborough Students	25	14	0	11	749	605	+144	13	5	74
6	Chester	25	13	1	11	690	618	+72	12	4	70
7	Stourbridge	25	11	1	13	679	616	+63	13	9	68
8	Hull	25	12	2	11	479	472	+7	5	6	63
9	Wharfedale	25	11	2	12	528	539	−11	5	6	59
10	Huddersfield	25	9	4	12	528	592	−64	9	4	57
11	Tynedale	24	9	2	13	583	592	−9	10	7	57
12	Sheffield Tigers	24	12	0	12	516	570	−54	5	3	56
13	Luctonians	25	9	1	15	496	609	−113	8	8	54
14	Otley (R)	25	9	3	13	508	628	−120	5	5	52
15	Preston Grasshoppers (R)	25	4	3	18	385	656	−271	3	4	29
16	Scunthorpe (R)	25	0	0	25	341	1302	−961	4	2	6

Updated to match(es) played on 14 March 2020. Source: "National League 2 North". NCA Rugby.
Rules for classification: If teams are level at any stage, tiebreakers are applied in the following order:
1. Number of matches won
2. Difference between points for and against
3. Total number of points for
4. Aggregate number of points scored in matches between tied teams
5. Number of matches won excluding the first match, then the second and so on until the tie is settled

On 4 April, the Rugby Football Union confirmed the final table for the season.

Final positions (with adjusted points)
Pos	Team	Pts^{*}	Promotion or relegation
1	Caldy (C)	142.79	Promotion place
2	Fylde (Note: Due to the COVID-19 pandemic in the United Kingdom the promotion playoff game between the runners up of National League 2 North and the 2019–20 National League 2 South was cancelled and the winners were determined on final points tally. Tonbridge Juddians with 117.02 points were promoted ahead of Fylde with 107.88.)	107.88	
3	Hinckley	101.73	
4	Sedgley Park	100.38	
5	Loughborough Students	90.10	
6	Chester	84.71	
7	Stourbridge	81.44	
8	Hull	76.25	
9	Wharfedale	70.29	
10	Sheffield Tigers	70.00	
11	Tynedale	69.97	
12	Huddersfield	68.17	
13	Luctonians	64.71	
14	Otley (R)	62.79	Relegation place
15	Preston Grasshoppers (R)	34.52	Relegation place
16	Scunthorpe (R)	7.21	Relegation place

Updated to match(es) played on 4 April 2020. Source: "National League 2 North" (PDF). England Rugby.

== Fixtures & Results ==
=== Round 1 ===
7 September 2019
14:30

Preston Grasshoppers	20 – 30	Sedgley Park (1 BP)
	Report

Lightfoot Green
Attendance: 457
Referee: Ben Davis

7 September 2019
15:00

Hinckley	13 – 29	Caldy (1 BP)
	Report

De Montfort Park
Attendance: 351
Referee: George Richardson

7 September 2019
15:00

Huddersfield	22 – 22	Hull
	Report

Lockwood Park
Attendance: 243
Referee: Llyr ApGeraint-Roberts

7 September 2019
15:00

(1 BP) Scunthorpe	32 – 52	Fylde (1 BP)
	Report

Heslam Park
Attendance: 221
Referee: Owen Taylor

7 September 2019
15:00

Sheffield Tigers	25 – 19	Chester (1 BP)
	Report

Dore Moor
Attendance: 131
Referee: Daniel Woods

7 September 2019
15:00

(1 BP) Stourbridge	31 – 20	Loughborough Students
	Report

Stourton Park
Attendance: 365
Referee: Ieuan Davies

7 September 2019
15:00

(2 BP) Tynedale	33 – 36	Luctonians (1 BP)
	Report

Tynedale Park
Attendance: 445
Referee: Michael Harris

7 September 2019
15:00

Wharfedale	15 – 8	Otley (1 BP)
	Report

The Avenue
Attendance: 693
Referee: Ben Rayner

=== Round 2 ===
14 September 2019
14:00

(1 BP) Loughborough Students	41 – 7	Hinckley
	Report

East Park
Attendance: 346
Referee: Jack Sutton

14 September 2019
14:30

Otley	15 – 15	Huddersfield
	Report

Cross Green
Attendance: 250
Referee: Hamish Smales

14 September 2019
14:30

Sedgley Park	17 – 14	Wharfedale (1 BP)
	Report

Park Lane
Attendance: 250
Referee: Owen Taylor

14 September 2019
15:00

Fylde	24 – 24	Preston Grasshoppers
	Report

Woodlands Memorial Ground
Attendance: 1,059
Referee: James O'Brien

14 September 2019
15:00

(1 BP) Hull	36 – 29	Tynedale (2 BP)
	Report

Ferens Ground
Attendance: 250
Referee: Daniel Woods

14 September 2019
15:00

Luctonians	19 – 45	Stourbridge (1 BP)
	Report

Mortimer Park
Attendance: 357
Referee: Neil Chivers

14 September 2019
15:00

(1 BP) Scunthorpe	27 – 31	Sheffield Tigers (1 BP)
	Report

Heslam Park
Attendance: 185
Referee: Llyr ApGeraint-Roberts

15 September 2019
15:00

Caldy	18 – 10	Chester
	Report

Paton Field
Attendance: 463
Referee: Benjamin Davis

=== Round 3 ===
21 September 2019
14:30

(1 BP) Preston Grasshoppers	48 – 24	Scunthorpe (1 BP)
	Report

Lightfoot Green
Attendance: 271
Referee: Ben Rayner

21 September 2019
15:00

(1 BP) Chester	29 – 23	Loughborough Students (1 BP)
	Report

Hare Lane
Attendance: 387
Referee: Tim Allatt

21 September 2019
15:00

(1 BP) Hinckley	23 – 17	Luctonians (1 BP)
	Report

De Montfort Park
Attendance: 680
Referee: Carl Adams

21 September 2019
15:00

Huddersfield	10 – 25	Sedgley Park
	Report

Lockwood Park
Attendance: 304
Referee: Michael Harris

21 September 2019
15:00

Sheffield Tigers	7 – 37	Caldy (1 BP)
	Report

Dore Moor
Attendance: 131
Referee: Daniel Rowlands

21 September 2019
15:00

(1 BP) Stourbridge	14 – 19	Hull
	Report

Stourton Park
Attendance: 350
Referee: Andrew Wigley

21 September 2019
15:00

(1 BP) Tynedale	34 – 34	Otley (1 BP)
	Report

Tynedale Park
Attendance: 340
Referee: Owen Taylor

21 September 2019
15:00

Wharfedale	19 – 32	Fylde (1 BP)
	Report

The Avenue
Attendance: 523
Referee: Ben Davis

=== Round 4 ===
28 September 2019
14:00

(1 BP) Loughborough Students	28 – 33	Caldy
	Report

East Park
Attendance: 219
Referee: Samuel Phillips

28 September 2019
14:30

(1 BP) Otley	27 – 31	Stourbridge (1 BP)
	Report

Cross Green
Attendance: 150
Referee: Michael Harris

28 September 2019
14:30

Preston Grasshoppers	10 – 9	Sheffield Tigers (1 BP)
	Report

Lightfoot Green
Attendance: 302
Referee: Dave Charlton

28 September 2019
14:30

(1 BP) Sedgley Park	7 – 12	Tynedale
	Report

Park Lane
Attendance: 250
Referee: Benjamin Davis

28 September 2019
15:00

(1 BP) Fylde	40 – 10	Huddersfield
	Report

Woodlands Memorial Ground
Attendance: 491
Referee: Daniel Woods

28 September 2019
15:00

Hull	18 – 36	Hinckley (1 BP)
	Report

Ferens Ground
Attendance: 200
Referee: Ieuan Davis

28 September 2019
15:00

(1 BP) Luctonians	20 – 24	Chester (1 BP)
	Report

Mortimer Park
Attendance: 427
Referee: Andrew Wigley

28 September 2019
15:00

Scunthorpe	5 – 24	Wharfedale
	Report

Heslam Park
Attendance: 220
Referee: George Richardson

=== Round 5 ===
5 October 2019
15:00

(1 BP) Caldy	62 – 10	Luctonians

Paton Field
Attendance: 317
Referee: Daniel Woods

5 October 2019
15:00

Chester	14 – 5	Hull

Hare Lane
Attendance: 368
Referee: Ben Davis

5 October 2019
15:00

(1 BP) Hinckley	14 – 17	Otley

De Montfort Park
Attendance: 545
Referee: Nikki O'Donnell

5 October 2019
15:00

Huddersfield	25 – 24	Scunthorpe (2 BP)

Lockwood Park
Attendance: 242
Referee: Tim Allatt

5 October 2019
15:00

(2 BP) Sheffield Tigers	37 – 40	Loughborough Students (1 BP)

Dore Moor
Attendance: 131
Referee: Robert Davidson

5 October 2019
15:00

(1 BP) Stourbridge	25 – 28	Sedgley Park

Stourton Park
Attendance: 325
Referee: Dan Parrott

5 October 2019
15:00

(2 BP) Tynedale	27 – 34	Fylde (1 BP)

Tynedale Park
Attendance: 420
Referee: Michael Harris

5 October 2019
15:00

Wharfedale	20 – 19	Preston Grasshoppers (1 BP)

The Avenue
Attendance: 427
Referee: George Richardson

=== Round 6 ===
12 October 2019
14:30

Otley	18 – 17	Chester (1 BP)

Cross Green
Attendance: 200
Referee: Daniel Woods

12 October 2019
14:30

(2 BP) Preston Grasshoppers	22 – 27	Huddersfield (1 BP)

Lightfoot Green
Attendance: 261
Referee: Carl Adams

12 October 2019
14:30

(1 BP) Sedgley Park	34 – 29	Hinckley (2 BP)

Park Lane
Attendance: 250
Referee: Pater Caunt

12 October 2019
15:00

(1 BP) Fylde	41 – 19	Stourbridge

Woodlands Memorial Ground
Attendance: 550
Referee: Owen Taylor

12 October 2019
15:00

Hull	17 – 31	Caldy (1 BP)

Ferens Ground
Attendance: 173
Referee: George Richardson

12 October 2019
15:00

(2 BP) Luctonians	33 – 36	Loughborough Students (1 BP)

Mortimer Park
Attendance: 565
Referee: Ieuan Davies

12 October 2019
15:00

Scunthorpe	17 – 59	Tynedale (1 BP)

Heslam Park
Attendance: 221
Referee: Chris Broomfield

12 October 2019
15:00

Wharfedale	18 – 34	Sheffield Tigers (1 BP)

The Avenue
Attendance: 573
Referee: Michael Harris

=== Round 7 ===
19 October 2019
14:00

Loughborough Students	22 – 17	Hull (1 BP)

East Park
Attendance: 264
Referee: Charles Gayther

19 October 2019
15:00

(1 BP) Caldy	50 – 12	Otley

Paton Field
Attendance: 315
Referee: Ben Rayner

19 October 2019
15:00

(1 BP) Chester	24 – 28	Sedgley Park (1 BP)

Hare Lane
Attendance: 328
Referee: Llyr ApGeraint-Roberts

19 October 2019
15:00

Hinckley	7 – 43	Fylde (1 BP)

De Montfort Park
Attendance: 560 (Note: Hinckley's attendance v Fylde on 19 October 2019 was incorrectly given as 275 in The Rugby Paper, with the official figure provided by Hinckley RFC instead being 560.)
Referee: Ieuan Davies

19 October 2019
15:00

(1 BP) Huddersfield	30 – 40	Wharfedale (1 BP)

Lockwood Park
Attendance: 332
Referee: Owen Taylor

19 October 2019
15:00

Sheffield Tigers	27 – 18	Luctonians

Dore Moor
Attendance: 247
Referee: Carl Adams

19 October 2019
15:00

(1 BP) Stourbridge	45 – 7	Scunthorpe

Stourton Park
Attendance: 435
Referee: Dan Rowlands

19 October 2019
15:00

(1 BP) Tynedale	34 – 5	Preston Grasshoppers

Tynedale Park
Attendance: 350
Referee: Benjamin Davis

=== Round 8 ===
26 October 2019
14:00

Hull	3 – 3	Luctonians

Ferens Ground
Attendance: 112
Referee: George Richardson

26 October 2019
14:30

Otley	19 – 12	Loughborough Students (1 BP)

Cross Green
Attendance: 150
Referee: Tim Allatt

26 October 2019
14:30

Preston Grasshoppers	20 – 17	Stourbridge (1 BP)

Lightfoot Green
Attendance: 211
Referee: Ben Rayner

26 October 2019
14:30

Sedgley Park	P – P	Caldy

Park Lane

- Postponed due to adverse weather conditions (wind/rain). Game to be rescheduled for 22 February 2020.

26 October 2019
15:00

(1 BP) Fylde	42 – 17	Chester

Woodlands Memorial Ground
Attendance: 510
Referee: James O'Brien

26 October 2019
15:00

Huddersfield	17 – 32	Sheffield Tigers (1 BP)

Lockwood Park
Attendance: 233
Referee: Ben Davies

26 October 2019
15:00

Scunthorpe	10 – 28	Hinckley (1 BP)

Heslam Park
Attendance: 470
Referee: Daniel Woods

26 October 2019
15:00

Wharfedale	27 – 27	Tynedale

The Avenue
Attendance: 458
Referee: Ieuan Davies

=== Round 9 ===
2 November 2019
14:00

Sheffield Tigers	12 – 9	Hull (1 BP)

Dore Moor
Attendance: 233
Referee: Tim Allatt

2 November 2019
14:00

(1 BP) Tynedale	33 – 18	Huddersfield

Tynedale Park
Attendance: 375
Referee: Michael Harris

2 November 2019
14:15

Caldy	25 – 18	Fylde (1 BP)

Paton Field
Attendance: 436
Referee: Owen Taylor

2 November 2019
14:15

Loughborough Students	23 – 18	Sedgley Park (1 BP)

East Park
Attendance: 212
Referee: Ben Rayner

2 November 2019
14:15

(1 BP) Luctonians	15 – 20	Otley

Mortimer Park
Attendance: 327
Referee: Lloyd Davies

2 November 2019
15:00

Chester	P – P	Scunthorpe

Hare Lane

- Postponed out of respect for James Walker - a Scunthorpe 1st XV player - who died on the morning before the game. Game to be rescheduled for 22 February 2020.

2 November 2019
15:30

(1 BP) Stourbridge	43 – 19	Wharfedale

Stourton Park
Attendance: 436
Referee: Andrew Wigley

2 November 2019
16:00

Hinckley	27 – 17	Preston Grasshoppers

De Montfort Park
Attendance: 560
Referee: George Richardson

=== Round 10 ===
9 November 2019
14:00

Tynedale	19 – 18	Sheffield Tigers (1 BP)

Tynedale Park
Attendance: 460
Referee: Owen Taylor

9 November 2019
14:00

(1 BP) Wharfedale	24 – 19	Hinckley (1 BP)

The Avenue
Attendance: 397
Referee: Benjamin Davis

9 November 2019
14:15

Scunthorpe	7 – 68	Caldy (1 BP)

Heslam Park
Attendance: 140
Referee: Michael Harris

9 November 2019
14:30

Otley	27 – 23	Hull (1 BP)

Cross Green
Attendance: 200
Referee: Nikki O'Donnell

9 November 2019
14:30

Preston Grasshoppers	10 – 27	Chester (1 BP)

Lightfoot Green
Attendance: 281
Referee: Andrew Wigley

9 November 2019
14:30

(1 BP) Sedgley Park	40 – 34	Luctonians (2 BP)

Park Lane
Attendance: 257
Referee: Carl Adams

9 November 2019
15:00

(1 BP) Fylde	33 – 7	Loughborough Students

Woodlands Memorial Ground
Attendance: 450
Referee: Llyr ApGeraint-Roberts

9 November 2019
15:00

(1 BP) Huddersfield	32 – 31	Stourbridge (2 BP)

Lockwood Park
Attendance: 238
Referee: Daniel Woods

=== Round 11 ===
16 November 2019
14:00

(2 BP) Hull	24 – 27	Sedgley Park

Ferens Ground
Attendance: 220
Referee: Dave Charlton

16 November 2019
14:00

(1 BP) Loughborough Students	57 – 11	Scunthorpe

East Park
Attendance: 230
Referee: Neil Sweeney

16 November 2019
14:00

Sheffield Tigers	21 – 6	Otley

Dore Moor
Attendance: 125
Referee: Carl Adams

16 November 2019
14:15

(1 BP) Caldy	49 – 21	Preston Grasshoppers

Paton Field
Attendance: 398
Referee: James O'Brien

16 November 2019
14:15

(1 BP) Luctonians	25 – 27	Fylde (1 BP)

Mortimer Park
Attendance: 327
Referee: George Richardson

16 November 2019
15:00

(1 BP) Chester	26 – 14	Wharfedale

Hare Lane
Attendance: 398
Referee: Daniel Woods

16 November 2019
15:00

(1 BP) Hinckley	36 – 33	Huddersfield (2 BP)

De Montfort Park
Attendance: 580 (Note: Hinckley's attendance v Huddersfield on 19 November 2019 was incorrectly given as 375 in The Rugby Paper, with the official figure provided by Hinckley RFC instead being 580.)
Referee: Timothy Allatt

16 November 2019
15:00

Stourbridge	13 – 10	Tynedale (1 BP)

Stourton Park
Attendance: 294
Referee: Iain Kiy

=== Round 12 ===
23 November 2019
14:00

Tynedale	20 – 15	Hinckley (1 BP)

Tynedale Park
Attendance: 280
Referee: Michael Harris

23 November 2019
14:00

(1 BP) Wharfedale	11 – 16	Caldy

The Avenue
Attendance: 463
Referee: David Charlton

23 November 2019
14:15

Scunthorpe	8 – 40	Luctonians (1 BP)

Heslam Park
Attendance: 110
Referee: Llyr ApGeraint-Roberts

23 November 2019
14:30

Preston Grasshoppers	21 – 34	Loughborough Students (1 BP)

Lightfoot Green
Attendance: 272
Referee: Hamish Grant

23 November 2019
14:30

(1 BP) Sedgley Park	47 – 19	Otley

Park Lane
Attendance: 320
Referee: Alexander Thomas

23 November 2019
15:00

(1 BP) Fylde	20 – 22	Hull

Woodlands Memorial Ground
Attendance: 700
Referee: Daniel Woods

23 November 2019
15:00

Huddersfield	27 – 27	Chester

Lockwood Park
Attendance: 314
Referee: Owen Taylor

23 November 2019
15:00

(1 BP) Stourbridge	17 – 20	Sheffield Tigers

Stourton Park
Attendance: 345
Referee: Benjamin Davis

=== Round 13 ===
30 November 2019
14:00

(1 BP) Hull	34 – 16	Scunthorpe

Ferens Ground
Attendance: 228
Referee: Owen Taylor

30 November 2019
14:00

(1 BP) Loughborough Students	48 – 12	Wharfedale

East Park
Attendance: 180
Referee: George Richardson

30 November 2019
14:00

Sheffield Tigers	19 – 29	Sedgley Park (1 BP)

Dore Moor
Attendance: 228
Referee: Elliot Lewis

30 November 2019
14:15

(1 BP) Caldy	34 – 13	Huddersfield

Paton Field
Attendance: 212
Referee: Benjamin Davis

30 November 2019
14:15

(1 BP) Luctonians	29 – 3	Preston Grasshoppers

Mortimer Park
Attendance: 334
Referee: Tom Bird

30 November 2019
14:30

Otley	14 – 23	Fylde

Cross Green
Attendance: 250
Referee: Gavin Jones

30 November 2019
15:00

(1 BP) Chester	36 – 17	Tynedale

Hare Lane
Attendance: 388
Referee: Ieuan Davies

30 November 2019
15:00

(1 BP) Hinckley	32 – 3	Stourbridge

De Montfort Park
Attendance: 520 (Note: Hinckley's attendance v Stourbridge on 30 November 2019 was incorrectly given as 216 in The Rugby Paper, with the official figure provided by Hinckley RFC instead being 520.)
Referee: Llyr ApGeraint-Roberts

=== Round 14 ===
7 December 2019
14:00

Tynedale	14 – 47	Caldy (1 BP)

Tynedale Park
Attendance: 340
Referee: David Charlton

7 December 2019
14:00

Wharfedale	25 – 5	Luctonians

The Avenue
Attendance: 372
Referee: Michael Harris

7 December 2019
14:15

(1 BP) Scunthorpe	24 – 62	Otley (1 BP)

Heslam Park
Attendance: 125
Referee: Tim Allatt

7 December 2019
14:30

(1 BP) Preston Grasshoppers	13 – 18	Hull

Lightfoot Green
Attendance: 333
Referee: Benjamin Davis

7 December 2019
15:00

Fylde	17 – 10	Sedgley Park (1 BP)

Woodlands Memorial Ground
Attendance: 750
Referee: Ben Rayner

7 December 2019
15:00

(1 BP) Hinckley	53 – 23	Sheffield Tigers

De Montfort Park
Attendance: 560
Referee: Michael Lamb

7 December 2019
15:00

Huddersfield	25 – 19	Loughborough Students (1 BP)

Lockwood Park
Attendance: 254
Referee: Daniel Woods

7 December 2019
15:00

(2 BP) Stourbridge	27 – 33	Chester (1 BP)

Stourton Park
Attendance: 305
Referee: Andrew Wigley

=== Round 15 ===
14 December 2019
14:00

Hull	12 – 9	Wharfedale (1 BP)

Ferens Ground
Attendance: 237
Referee: Matthew Astle (Note: The Rugby Paper reported Matthew Astle as being referee for the Hull v Wharfedale game while also referring Sedgley Park v Scunthorpe, both on 14 December 2019.)

14 December 2019
14:00

(1 BP) Loughborough Students	46 – 14	Tynedale

East Park
Attendance: 117
Referee: Peter Caunt

14 December 2019
14:00

Otley	0 – 0	Preston Grasshoppers

Cross Green
Attendance: 200
Referee: Daniel Woods

14 December 2019
14:00

Sheffield Tigers	16 – 10	Fylde (1 BP)

Dore Moor
Attendance: 238
Referee: Nikki O'Donnell

14 December 2019
14:15

(1 BP) Caldy	54 – 7	Stourbridge

Paton Field
Attendance: 454
Referee: James O'Brien

14 December 2019
14:15

Luctonians	15 – 10	Huddersfield (1 BP)

Mortimer Park
Attendance: 311
Referee: Iain Kiy

14 December 2019
14:30

(1 BP) Sedgley Park	59 – 7	Scunthorpe

Park Lane
Attendance: 300
Referee: Matthew Atsle (Note: The Rugby Paper reported Matthew Astle as being referee for the Sedgley Park v Scunthorpe game while also referring Hull v Wharfedale on the same day, both on 14 December 2019.)

14 December 2019
15:00

Chester	19 – 18	Hinckley (1 BP)

Hare Lane
Attendance: 328
Referee: Llyr ApGeraint-Roberts

=== Round 16 ===
21 December 2019
14:00

(1 BP) Sheffield Tigers	56 – 14	Scunthorpe

Door Moor
Attendance: 176
Referee: Andy Smith

21 December 2019
14:00

(1 BP) Stourbridge	10 – 14	Luctonians

Stourton Park
Attendance: 525
Referee: Iain Kiy

21 December 2019
14:00

(1 BP) Tynedale	12 – 16	Hull

Tynedale Park
Attendance: 650
Referee: Alan Chandrachud

21 December 2019
14:00

(2 BP) Wharfedale	36 – 39	Sedgley Park (1 BP)

The Avenue
Attendance: 635
Referee: Owen Taylor

21 December 2019
14:30

Preston Grasshoppers	3 – 28	Fylde (1 BP)

Lightfoot Green
Attendance: 786
Referee: Benjamin Davis

21 December 2019
15:00

Chester	12 – 53	Caldy (1 BP)

Hare Lane
Attendance: 458
Referee: Tim Allatt

21 December 2019
15:00

Hinckley	15 – 9	Loughborough Students (1 BP)

De Montfort Park
Attendance: 694
Referee: George Richardson

21 December 2019
15:00

Huddersfield	15 – 27	Otley

Lockwood Park
Attendance: 324
Referee: Matt Sharpe

=== Round 17 ===
4 January 2020
14:00

(1 BP) Hull	18 – 25	Stourbridge (1 BP)

Ferens Ground
Attendance: 176
Referee: Ben Rayner

4 January 2020
14:00

(1 BP) Loughborough Students	64 – 31	Chester (1 BP)

East Park
Attendance: 126
Referee: Daniel Rowlands

4 January 2020
14:00

Otley	16 – 13	Tynedale (1 BP)

Cross Green
Attendance: 200
Referee: George Richardson

4 January 2020
14:15

(1 BP) Caldy	40 – 7	Sheffield Tigers

Paton Field
Attendance: 423
Referee: Benjamin Davies

4 January 2020
14:15

(1 BP) Luctonians	20 – 26	Hinckley (1 BP)

Mortimer Park
Attendance: 531
Referee: Ieuan Davies

4 January 2020
14:15

Scunthorpe	7 – 30	Preston Grasshoppers (1 BP)

Heslam Park
Attendance: 150
Referee: Michael Roberts

4 January 2020
14:30

(1 BP) Sedgley Park	28 – 24	Huddersfield (2 BP)

Park Lane
Attendance: 216
Referee: James O'Brien

4 January 2020
15:00

(1 BP) Fylde	24 – 17	Wharfedale (1 BP)

Woodlands Memorial Ground
Attendance: 784
Referee: Andrew Wigley

=== Round 18 ===
11 January 2020
14:00

Sheffield Tigers	11 – 10	Preston Grasshoppers (1 BP)

Dore Moor
Attendance: 222
Referee: Llyr ApGeraint-Roberts

11 January 2020
14:00

Tynedale	15 – 8	Sedgley Park (1 BP)

Tynedale Park
Attendance: 380
Referee: Daniel Woods

11 January 2020
14:00

(1 BP) Wharfedale	49 – 12	Scunthorpe

The Avenue
Attendance: 495
Referee: Timothy Allatt

11 January 2020
14:15

(1 BP) Caldy	41 – 7	Loughborough Students

Paton Field
Attendance: 298
Referee: Daniel Rowlands

11 January 2020
15:00

(2 BP) Chester	25 – 29	Luctonians (1 BP)

Hare Lane
Attendance: 450
Referee: Elliot Lewis

11 January 2020
15:00

Hinckley	19 – 8	Hull

De Montfort Park
Attendance: 276
Referee: Lloyd Davies

11 January 2020
15:00

(1 BP) Huddersfield	32 – 15	Fylde

Lockwood Park
Attendance: 314
Referee: Owen Taylor

11 January 2020
15:00

(1 BP) Stourbridge	50 – 12	Otley

Stourton Park
Attendance: 385
Referee: Joe James

=== Round 19 ===
18 January 2020
14:00

Hull	27 – 16	Chester

Ferens Ground
Attendance: 187
Referee: Daniel Woods

18 January 2020
14:00

(1 BP) Loughborough Students	36 – 24	Sheffield Tigers

East Park
Attendance: 237
Referee: Tom Bird

18 January 2020
14:00

(1 BP) Otley	14 – 19	Hinckley

Cross Green
Attendance: 200
Referee: Tim Allatt

18 January 2020
14:15

Luctonians	3 – 31	Caldy (1 BP)

Mortimer Park
Attendance: 311
Referee: Iain Kiy

18 January 2020
14:15

Scunthorpe	17 – 28	Huddersfield (1 BP)

Heslam Park
Attendance: 220
Referee: Gavin Jones

18 January 2020
14:30

Preston Grasshoppers	26 – 26	Wharfedale

Lightfoot Green
Attendance: 402
Referee: Ieuan Davies

18 January 2020
14:30

Sedgley Park	30 – 28	Stourbridge (2 BP)

Park Lane
Attendance: 234
Referee: Peter Caunt

18 January 2020
15:00

(1 BP) Fylde	50 – 10	Tynedale

Woodlands Memorial Ground
Attendance: 500
Referee: Ben Davis

=== Round 20 ===
25 January 2020
14:00

Loughborough Students	10 – 19	Luctonians

East Park
Attendance: 568
Referee: Owen Taylor

25 January 2020
14:00

Sheffield Tigers	17 – 25	Wharfedale

Dore Moor
Attendance: 294
Referee: George Richardson

25 January 2020
14:00

(1 BP) Tynedale	54 – 5	Scunthorpe

Tynedale Park
Attendance: 525
Referee: Michael Harris

25 January 2020
14:15

Caldy	27 – 17	Hull

Paton Field
Attendance: 352
Referee: Benjamin Davis

25 January 2020
15:00

(1 BP) Chester	36 – 17	Otley

Hare Lane
Attendance: 365
Referee: James O'Brien

25 January 2020
15:00

(1 BP) Hinckley	50 – 15	Sedgley Park

De Montfort Park
Attendance: 766
Referee: Harry Walbaum

25 January 2020
15:00

Huddersfield	25 – 15	Preston Grasshoppers

Lockwood Park
Attendance: 450
Referee: Daniel Woods

25 January 2020
15:00

Stourbridge	12 – 64	Fylde (1 BP)

Stourton Park
Attendance: 345
Referee: Ieuan Davies

=== Round 21 ===
1 February 2020
14:00

(1 BP) Hull	33 – 20	Loughborough Students (1 BP)

Ferens Ground
Attendance: 145
Referee: Ieuan Davies

1 February 2020
14:00

Wharfedale	10 – 3	Huddersfield (1 BP)

The Avenue
Attendance: 397
Referee: Benjamin Davis

1 February 2020
14:15

(1 BP) Luctonians	27 – 7	Sheffield Tigers

Mortimer Park
Attendance: 297
Referee: Charles Gayther

1 February 2020
14:15

Scunthorpe	15 – 76	Stourbridge (1 BP)

Heslam Park
Attendance: 142
Referee: Timothy Allatt

1 February 2020
14:30

Otley	12 – 31	Caldy (1 BP)

Cross Green
Attendance: 300
Referee: Daniel Woods

1 February 2020
14:30

Preston Grasshoppers	14 – 29	Tynedale (1 BP)

Lightfoot Green
Attendance: 217
Referee: Ben Rayner

1 February 2020
14:30

(1 BP) Sedgley Park	27 – 14	Chester

Park Lane
Attendance: 175
Referee: Michael Harris

1 February 2020
15:00

Fylde	17 – 27	Hinckley (1 BP)

Woodlands Memorial Ground
Attendance: 750
Referee: Ben Rowlands

=== Round 22 ===
8 February 2020
14:00

(1 BP) Loughborough Students	47 – 33	Otley (1 BP)

East Park
Attendance: 222
Referee: Samuel Phillips

8 February 2020
14:00

Sheffield Tigers	10 – 27	Huddersfield (1 BP)

Dore Moor
Attendance: 423
Referee: Jamie Leahy

8 February 2020
14:00

(1 BP) Tynedale	26 – 34	Wharfedale (1 BP)

Tynedale Park
Attendance: 550
Referee: Owen Taylor

8 February 2020
14:15

(1 BP) Caldy	32 – 11	Sedgley Park

Paton Field
Attendance: 398
Referee: Ben Rayner

8 February 2020
14:15

(1 BP) Luctonians	10 – 17	Hull

Mortimer Park
Attendance: 311
Referee: Lloyd Davies

8 February 2020
15:00

Chester	15 – 51	Fylde (1 BP)

Hare Lane
Attendance: 670
Referee: Ieuan Davies

8 February 2020
15:00

(1 BP) Hinckley	47 – 5	Scunthorpe

De Montfort Park
Attendance: 560
Referee: Ben Davis

8 February 2020
15:00

(1 BP) Stourbridge	52 – 12	Preston Grasshoppers

Stourton Park
Attendance: 325
Referee: Llyr ApGeraint-Roberts

=== Round 23 ===
15 February 2020
14:00

(1 BP) Hull	34 – 21	Sheffield Tigers

Ferens Ground
Attendance: 150
Referee: Daniel Rowlands

15 February 2020
14:00

Otley	P – P	Luctonians

Cross Green

- Postponed. Game to be rescheduled for 22 February 2020.

15 February 2020
14:00

Wharfedale	P – P	Stourbridge

The Avenue

- Postponed. Game to be rescheduled for 22 February 2020.

15 February 2020
14:15

Scunthorpe	P – P	Chester

Heslam Park

- Postponed. Game to be rescheduled for 14 March 2020.

15 February 2020
14:30

Preston Grasshoppers	3 – 33	Hinckley (1 BP)

Lightfoot Green
Attendance: 327
Referee: Ian Tempest

15 February 2020
14:30

Sedgley Park	P – P	Loughborough Students

Park Lane

- Postponed. Game to be rescheduled for 14 March 2020.

15 February 2020
15:00

Fylde	7 – 15	Caldy

Woodlands Memorial Ground
Attendance: 850
Referee: George Richardson

15 February 2020
15:00

Huddersfield	P – P	Tynedale

Lockwood Park

- Postponed. Game to be rescheduled for 22 February 2020.

=== Rounds 8, 9 & 23 (rescheduled games) ===
22 February 2020
14:00

Otley	P – P	Luctonians

Cross Green

- Game originally rescheduled from 15 February 2020 but postponed again due to bad weather. Game to be rescheduled for 14 March 2020.

22 February 2020
14:00

Wharfedale	P – P	Stourbridge

The Avenue

- Game originally rescheduled from 15 February 2020 but postponed again due to bad weather. Game to be rescheduled for 14 March 2020.

22 February 2020
14:30

Sedgley Park	10 – 29	Caldy (1 BP)

Park Lane
Attendance: 300
Referee: Llyr ApGeraint-Roberts

- Game rescheduled from 26 October 2019.

22 February 2020
15:00

(1 BP) Chester	109 – 12	Scunthorpe

Hare Lane
Attendance: 324
Referee: George Richardson

- Game rescheduled from 2 November 2019. Scunthorpe are relegated.

22 February 2020
15:00

Huddersfield	P – P	Tynedale

Lockwood Park

- Game originally rescheduled from 15 February 2020 but postponed again due to bad weather. Game to be rescheduled for 14 March 2020.

=== Round 24 ===
29 February 2020
14:00

Hull	20 – 14	Otley (1 BP)

Ferens Ground
Attendance: 215
Referee: Gavin Jones

29 February 2020
14:00

(1 BP) Loughborough Students	32 – 30	Fylde (2 BP)

East Park
Attendance: 266
Referee: Carl Adams

29 February 2020
14:00

Sheffield Tigers	P – P	Tynedale

Dore Moor

- Postponed due to bad weather. Game to be rescheduled for 11 April 2020.

29 February 2020
14:15

(1 BP) Caldy	103 – 0	Scunthorpe

Paton Field
Attendance: 287
Referee: James O'Brien

29 February 2020
14:15

Luctonians	22 – 13	Sedgley Park

Mortimer Park
Attendance: 367
Referee: Iain Kiy

29 February 2020
15:00

(1 BP) Chester	27 – 14	Preston Grasshoppers

Hare Lane
Attendance: 320
Referee: Llyr ApGeraint-Roberts

29 February 2020
15:00

Hinckley	17 – 7	Wharfedale

De Montfort Park
Attendance: 600
Referee: Andrew Wigley

29 February 2020
15:00

Stourbridge	14 – 14	Huddersfield

Stourton Park
Attendance: 240
Referee: Owen Taylor

=== Round 25 ===
7 March 2020
14:00

(2 BP) Tynedale	27 – 29	Stourbridge (1 BP)

Tynedale Park
Attendance: 380
Referee: James O'Brien

7 March 2020
14:30

(2 BP) Otley	29 – 32	Sheffield Tigers

Cross Green
Attendance: 250
Referee: Owen Taylor

7 March 2020
14:30

Preston Grasshoppers	5 – 49	Caldy (1 BP)

Lightfoot Green
Attendance: 279
Referee: Daniel Rowlands

- Caldy are champions.

7 March 2020
14:30

Sedgley Park	13 – 10	Hull (1 BP)

Park Lane
Attendance: 320
Referee: Daniel Woods

7 March 2020
15:00

(1 BP) Fylde	48 – 10	Luctonians

Woodlands Memorial Ground
Attendance: 750
Referee: Benjamin Davis

7 March 2020
15:00

Huddersfield	15 – 24	Hinckley

Lockwood Park
Attendance: 240
Referee: Jamie Leahy

7 March 2020
15:00

Scunthorpe	7 – 54	Loughborough Students (1 BP)

Heslam Park
Attendance: 110
Referee: Peter Caunt

7 March 2020
15:00

(1 BP) Wharfedale	14 – 19	Chester

The Avenue
Attendance: 415
Referee: Timothy Allatt

=== Round 23 (rescheduled games) ===
14 March 2020
14:00

(1 BP) Otley	36 – 24	Luctonians (1 BP)

Cross Green
Attendance: 300
Referee: Mike Harris

- Game originally rescheduled from 15 February 2020 and then again from 22 February 2020.

14 March 2020
14:15

Scunthorpe	18 – 64	Chester (1 BP)

Heslam Park
Attendance: 110
Referee: Matthew Sharpe

- Game rescheduled from 15 February 2020.

14 March 2020
14:30

(1 BP) Sedgley Park	32 – 14	Loughborough Students

Park Lane
Attendance: 200
Referee: Daniel Rowlands

- Game rescheduled from 15 February 2020.

14 March 2020
15:00

(1 BP) Huddersfield	31 – 15	Tynedale

Lockwood Park
Attendance: 197
Referee: Elliot Lewis

- Game originally rescheduled from 15 February 2020 and then again from 22 February 2020.

14 March 2020
15:00

Wharfedale	19 – 15	Stourbridge (1 BP)

The Avenue
Attendance: 380
Referee: Benjamin Davis

- Game originally rescheduled from 15 February 2020 and then again from 22 February 2020.

=== Round 26 ===
21 March 2020
14:00

Hull	C – C	Fylde

Ferens Ground

21 March 2020
14:00

Loughborough Students	C – C	Preston Grasshoppers

East Park

21 March 2020
14:30

Otley	C – C	Sedgley Park

Cross Green

21 March 2020
15:00

Caldy	C – C	Wharfedale

Paton Field

21 March 2020
15:00

Chester	C – C	Huddersfield

Hare Lane

21 March 2020
15:00

Hinckley	C – C	Tynedale

De Montfort Park

21 March 2020
15:00

Luctonians	C – C	Scunthorpe

Mortimer Park

21 March 2020
15:00

Sheffield Tigers	C – C	Stourbridge

Dore Moor

=== Round 27 ===
28 March 2020
14:00

Tynedale	C – C	Chester

Tynedale Park

28 March 2020
14:30

Preston Grasshoppers	C – C	Luctonians

Lightfoot Green

28 March 2020
14:30

Sedgley Park	C – C	Sheffield Tigers

Park Lane

28 March 2020
15:00

Fylde	C – C	Otley

Woodlands Memorial Ground

28 March 2020
15:00

Huddersfield	C – C	Caldy

Lockwood Park

28 March 2020
15:00

Scunthorpe	C – C	Hull

Heslam Park

28 March 2020
15:00

Stourbridge	C – C	Hinckley

Stourton Park

28 March 2020
15:00

Wharfedale	C – C	Loughborough Students

The Avenue

=== Round 28 ===
4 April 2020
14:00

Loughborough Students	C – C	Huddersfield

East Park

4 April 2020
14:30

Otley	C – C	Scunthorpe

Cross Green

4 April 2020
14:30

Sedgley Park	C – C	Fylde

Park Lane

4 April 2020
15:00

Caldy	C – C	Tynedale

Paton Field

4 April 2020
15:00

Chester	C – C	Stourbridge

Hare Lane

4 April 2020
15:00

Hull	C – C	Preston Grasshoppers

Ferens Ground

4 April 2020
15:00

Luctonians	C – C	Wharfedale

Mortimer Park

4 April 2020
15:00

Sheffield Tigers	C – C	Hinckley

Dore Moor

=== Round 24 (rescheduled game) ===
11 April 2020
14:00

Sheffield Tigers	C – C	Tynedale

Dore Moor

- Game rescheduled from 29 February 2020.

=== Round 29 ===
18 April 2020
14:00

Stourbridge	C – C	Caldy

Stourton Park

18 April 2020
14:30

Preston Grasshoppers	C – C	Otley

Lightfoot Green

18 April 2020
15:00

Fylde	C – C	Sheffield Tigers

Woodlands Memorial Ground

18 April 2020
15:00

Hinckley	C – C	Chester

De Montfort Park

18 April 2020
15:00

Huddersfield	C – C	Luctonians

Lockwood Park

18 April 2020
15:00

Scunthorpe	C – C	Sedgley Park

Heslam Park

18 April 2020
15:00

Tynedale	C – C	Loughborough Students

Tynedale Park

18 April 2020
15:00

Wharfedale	C – C	Hull

The Avenue

=== Round 30 ===
25 April 2020
15:00

Caldy	C – C	Hinckley

Paton Field

25 April 2020
15:00

Chester	C – C	Sheffield Tigers

Hare Lane

25 April 2020
15:00

Fylde	C – C	Scunthorpe

Woodlands Memorial Ground

25 April 2020
15:00

Hull	C – C	Huddersfield

Ferens Ground

25 April 2020
15:00

Loughborough Students	C – C	Stourbridge

East Park

25 April 2020
15:00

Luctonians	C – C	Tynedale

Mortimer Park

25 April 2020
15:00

Otley	C – C	Wharfedale

Cross Green

25 April 2020
15:00

Sedgley Park	C – C	Preston Grasshoppers

Park Lane

== Attendances ==
- Does not include promotion play-off.

Club	Home games	Total	Average	Highest	Lowest	% Capacity
Caldy	12	4,353	363	463	212	9%
Chester	12	4,784	399	670	320	20%
Fylde	12	8,144	679	1,059	450	9%
Hinckley	13	7,049	542	766	276	27%
Huddersfield	13	3,685	283	450	197	19%
Hull	12	2,293	191	250	112	13%
Loughborough Students	12	2,987	249	568	117	25%
Luctonians	12	4,465	372	565	297	15%
Otley	12	2,650	221	300	150	3%
Preston Grasshoppers	13	4,399	338	786	211	15%
Scunthorpe	13	2,424	186	470	110	15%
Sedgley Park	12	3,072	256	320	175	9%
Sheffield Tigers	12	2,579	215	423	125	21%
Stourbridge	13	4,675	360	525	240	10%
Tynedale	13	5,495	423	650	280	21%
Wharfedale	13	6,228	479	693	372	24%

== Individual statistics ==
- Note that points scorers includes tries as well as conversions, penalties and drop goals. Appearance figures also include coming on as substitutes (unused substitutes not included).

=== Top points scorers ===
Rank	Player	Team	Points
1	(Wales) Gavin Roberts	Caldy	269
2	(England) Mark Ireland	Sheffield Tigers	251
3	(England) Gregory Smith	Fylde	236
4	(England) Joe Wilson	Hinckley	197
5	(England) Owen Waters	Loughborough Students	190
6	(England) Jack Blakeney-Edwards	Wharfedale	186
7	(England) Will Milner	Huddersfield	166
8	(England) Simon Humberstone	Hull	158
9	(England) Dan Rundle	Stourbridge	150

=== Top try scorers ===
Rank	Player	Team	Tries
1	(England) Dan Rundle	Stourbridge	30
2	(England) Nick Royle	Caldy	26
3	(England) Thomas Carleton	Fylde	23
4	(England) JJ Dickinson	Caldy	16
4	(England) Connor Wilkinson	Fylde	16
5	(England) Jack Lea	Stourbridge	15
6	(England) Tom Grimes	Fylde	14
6	(England) Ben Jones	Caldy	14
6	(England) William Kaye	Loughborough Students	14
6	(England) Frank Kelly	Luctonians	14

== Season records ==
=== Team ===
Largest home win — 103 points

103 – 0 Caldy at home to Scunthorpe on 29 February 2020

Largest away win — 61 points (2)

68 – 7 Caldy away to Scunthorpe on 9 November 2019
76 – 15 Stourbridge away to Scunthorpe on 1 February 2020

Most points scored — 109 points

109 – 12 Chester at home to Scunthorpe on 22 February 2020

Most tries in a match — 17 (2)

Chester at home to Scunthorpe on 22 February 2020
Caldy at home to Scunthorpe on 29 February 2020

Most conversions in a match — 12

Chester at home to Scunthorpe on 22 February 2020

Most penalties in a match — 6

Sheffield Tigers away to Otley on 7 March 2020

Most drop goals in a match — 1 (2)

Sedgley Park away to Hull on 16 November 2019
Sedgley Park at home to Stourbridge on 18 January 2020

=== Attendances ===
Highest — 1,059

Fylde at home to Preston Grasshoppers on 14 September 2019

Lowest — 110 (3)

Scunthorpe at home to Luctonians on 23 November 2019
Scunthorpe at home to Loughborough Students on 7 March 2020
Scunthorpe at home to Chester on 14 March 2020

Highest average attendance — 679

Fylde

Lowest average attendance — 186

Hull

=== Player ===
Most points in a match — 38

(England) Ben Jones for Caldy away to Scunthorpe on 9 November 2019

Most tries in a match — 4 (3)

(England) Nick Royle for Caldy at home to Luctonians on 5 October 2019
(England) Ben Jones for Caldy away to Scunthorpe on 9 November 2019
(England) Nick Royle for Caldy at home to Scunthorpe on 29 February 2020

Most conversions in a match — 12

(England) Dan Pemberton for Chester at home to Scunthorpe on 23 February 2020

Most penalties in a match — 6

(England) Mark Ireland for Sheffield Tigers away to Otley on 7 March 2020

Most drop goals in a match — 1 (2)

(England) Callum McShane for Sedgley Park away to Hull on 16 November 2019
(England) Stephen Collins for Sedgley Park at home to Stourbridge on 18 January 2020

== See also ==
- 2019–20 National League 2 South
- 2019–20 National League 1
- English rugby union system
- Rugby union in England
