= 2019–20 National League 1 =

Rugby union competition in England

- Countries: England
- Date: September 2019 – 14 March 2020
- Champions: Richmond (3rd title)
- Runners-up: Rams
- Relegated: Hull Ionians, Canterbury, Rotherham Titans
- Matches played: 198
- Attendance: 110,390 (average 558 per match)
- Highest attendance: 2,000; Rosslyn Park v Richmond; 6 March 2020
- Lowest attendance: 145; Cinderford v Blackheath; 7 March 2020
- Tries scored: 1279 (average 6.5 per match)
- Top point scorer: (South Africa) Warren Seals (Darlington MP); 267 points
- Top try scorer: (England) Jake Lloyd (Blackheath) (England) Jason Worrall (Chinnor); 18 tries each

The 2019–20 National League 1, known for sponsorship reasons as the SSE National League 1, was the 11th season of the third tier of the English rugby union system, since the professionalised format of the second tier RFU Championship was introduced; and was the 33rd season since league rugby began in 1987.

Newly promoted Canterbury were the first team to be relegated after losing away to league leaders Richmond on 29 February, with six games still to play. Hull Ionians, also newly promoted, were the second team to be relegated after losing their rescheduled match at home to Blackheath on 14 March - Ionians having six games still to play.

Due to the COVID-19 pandemic in the United Kingdom the Rugby Football Union officially cancelled the season after an initially suspension of all rugby in England including training, from which was scheduled to last until 14 April 2020. After the cancellation was announced the RFU used a best playing record formula to decide the final table. This meant that Richmond, who had been 7 points clear when the league had been suspended, were crowned as champions, beating off stiff opposition from Rosslyn Park (who beat Richmond home and away) and newly promoted Rams, who had a fantastic debut season in the third tier. Richmond's title was their third at level 3, and tied them with Coventry and Otley as the clubs that had the most league titles. It also was the fourth time Richmond had been promoted from tier 3 - a divisional record.

With two relegation spots already decided, it was tough luck for Rotherham Titans who were designated as the third team to go down, despite a late surge which had seen them gaining ground on 13th placed Birmingham Moseley. It was also a great fall for a side that were once playing in the Premiership and the lowest level for the club since the mid-1990s. Richmond would return to the 2020–21 RFU Championship after one season away, while Rotherham Titans and Hull Ionians would relegated to 2021–22 National League North and Canterbury to 2021–22 National League South.

Another interesting statistic from the season was Brandon Asher-Wood's 7 tries for Darlington Mowden Park's resounding win against Hull Ionians on 21 December 2019. Wood's tries equalled the league record of 7 previously set by Hugo Ellis of Rosslyn Park back in the 2012–13 season.

== Structure ==
The league consists of sixteen teams with all the teams playing each other on a home and away basis to make a total of thirty matches each. There is one promotion place with the champions promoted to the Greene King IPA Championship. There are usually three relegation places with the bottom three teams relegated to either National League 2 North or National League 2 South depending on the geographical location of the team.

The results of the matches contribute points to the league as follows:

- 4 points are awarded for a win
- 2 points are awarded for a draw
- 0 points are awarded for a loss, however
- 1 losing (bonus) point is awarded to a team that loses a match by 7 points or fewer
- 1 additional (bonus) point is awarded to a team scoring 4 tries or more in a match.

== Participating teams and locations ==
2019–20 National 1 teams in England
2019–20 Greater London National League 1 clubs

Twelve of the sixteen teams participated in the preceding season's competition. The 2018–19 champions, Ampthill, were promoted to the 2019–20 RFU Championship, swapping places with bottom club, Richmond, who were relegated from the 2018–19 RFU Championship. Sides relegated from the 2018–19 National League 1 were Loughborough Students, Esher and Caldy.

The teams promoted into the division were Hull Ionians and Rams, champions of 2018–19 National League 2 North and 2018–19 National League 2 South respectively, along with the south runners-up Canterbury, who defeated the north's Chester in the promotion play-off. Ionians return to the division after a season's absence, while Rams and Canterbury are debuting in National 1 – the highest level either club have reached since the leagues began.

Team	Ground	Capacity	City/Area	Previous season
Birmingham Moseley	Billesley Common	5,000 (1,300 seats)	Birmingham, West Midlands	12th
Bishop's Stortford	Silver Leys	1,600	Bishop's Stortford, Hertfordshire	9th
Blackheath	Well Hall	1,650 (550 seats)	Eltham, London	4th
Cambridge	Grantchester Road	2,000 (200 seats)	Cambridge, Cambridgeshire	13th
Canterbury	Marine Travel Ground	1,500 (75 seats)	Canterbury, Kent	Promoted from N2S (playoff)
Chinnor	Kingsey Road	2,000	Thame, Oxfordshire	10th
Cinderford	Dockham Road	2,500	Cinderford, Gloucestershire	8th
Darlington Mowden Park	Northern Echo Arena	25,500	Darlington, County Durham	7th
Hull Ionians	Brantingham Park	1,500 (240 seats)	Brantingham, East Riding	Promoted from N2N (champions)
Old Elthamians	College Meadow	1,800	Eltham, London	Runners up
Plymouth Albion	The Brickfields	8,500	Plymouth, Devon	5th
Rams	Old Bath Road	1,250	Sonning, Reading, Berkshire	Promoted from N2S (champions)
Richmond	Athletic Ground	4,500 (1,000 seats)	Richmond, London	Relegated from Championship
Rosslyn Park	The Rock	2,000 (630 seats)	Roehampton, London	3rd
Rotherham Titans	Clifton Lane	2,500	Rotherham, South Yorkshire	6th
Sale FC	Heywood Road	3,387	Sale, Greater Manchester	11th

== Tables ==
At the date the leagues were suspended, the National League 1 table read as follows:

2019–20 National League 1 table (to the date when play stopped due to COVID-19)
Pos	Team	Pld	W	D	L	PF	PA	PD	TB	LB	Pts
1	Richmond (C)	25	20	0	5	741	347	+394	12	5	97
2	Rosslyn Park	25	18	1	6	728	472	+256	12	4	90
3	Rams	25	19	0	6	680	521	+159	16	2	89 (Note: Rams deducted 5 points due to an issue with their Payment of Players declaration during the 2018–19 National League 2 South season.)
4	Chinnor	25	16	2	7	631	502	+129	13	4	85
5	Blackheath	25	16	1	8	621	511	+110	12	4	82
6	Plymouth Albion	25	13	2	10	698	617	+81	14	5	75
7	Darlington Mowden Park	25	13	1	11	796	517	+279	14	6	74
8	Old Elthamians	25	13	1	11	574	501	+73	10	4	68
9	Cambridge	25	12	2	11	571	560	+11	11	4	67
10	Cinderford	23	13	0	10	526	452	+74	7	6	65
11	Sale FC	25	12	0	13	621	602	+19	10	6	64
12	Bishop's Stortford	24	9	2	13	599	595	+4	12	9	61
13	Birmingham Moseley	25	8	0	17	505	649	−144	4	8	44
14	Rotherham Titans (R)	25	6	1	18	490	727	−237	7	7	40
15	Canterbury (R)	25	2	0	23	357	824	−467	2	6	16
16	Hull Ionians (R)	24	1	1	22	330	1071	−741	3	2	11

Updated to match(es) played on 14 March 2020. Source: "National League 1". NCA Rugby. Archived from the original on 2016-03-04.
Rules for classification: If teams are level at any stage, tiebreakers are applied in the following order:
1. Number of matches won
2. Difference between points for and against
3. Total number of points for
4. Aggregate number of points scored in matches between tied teams
5. Number of matches won excluding the first match, then the second and so on until the tie is settled
  Notes:

On 4 April, the RFU confirmed the final table for the season.

Final positions (with adjusted points)
Pos	Team	Pts^{*}	Promotion or relegation
1	Richmond (C)	116.44	Promotion place
2	Rams	107.79	
3	Rosslyn Park	107.21	
4	Chinnor	102.60	
5	Blackheath	98.17	
6	Plymouth Albion	89.13	
7	Darlington Mowden Park	89.04	
8	Cinderford	84.32	
9	Old Elthamians	82.21	
10	Cambridge	80.29	
11	Bishop's Stortford	77.52	
12	Sale FC	75.48	
13	Birmingham Moseley	52.02	
14	Rotherham Titans (R)	48.85	Relegation place
15	Canterbury (R)	18.85	Relegation place
16	Hull Ionians (R)	13.75	Relegation place

Updated to match(es) played on 4 April 2020. Source: "National League 1" (PDF). England Rugby.

== Fixtures & results ==
=== Round 1 ===
7 September 2019
14:00

(1 BP) Sale FC	22 – 46	Cinderford (1 BP)
	Report

Heywood Road
Attendance: 367
Referee: Colin Burrell

7 September 2019
15:00

(1 BP) Birmingham Moseley	70 – 16	Hull Ionians
	Report

Billesley Common
Attendance: 703
Referee: James O'Brien

7 September 2019
15:00

(1 BP) Blackheath	15 – 17	Chinnor
	Report

Well Hall
Attendance: 403
Referee: Adam Leal

7 September 2019
15:00

(2 BP) Cambridge	32 – 36	Rams (1 BP)
	Report

Grantchester Road
Attendance: 478
Referee: Nick Wood

7 September 2019
15:00

Canterbury	14 – 37	Old Elthamians (1 BP)
	Report

Marine Travel Ground
Attendance: 423
Referee: James Clarke

7 September 2019
15:00

(2 BP) Darlington Mowden Park	37 – 40	Richmond (1 BP)
	Report

Northern Echo Arena
Attendance: 1,011
Referee: Alex Thomas

7 September 2019
15:00

(2 BP) Plymouth Albion	40 – 42	Bishop's Stortford (1 BP)
	Report

Brickfields
Attendance: 1,148
Referee: Sara Cox

7 September 2019
15:00

(1 BP) Rosslyn Park	38 – 19	Rotherham Titans
	Report

The Rock
Attendance: 495
Referee: Karl Dickson

=== Round 2 ===
14 September 2019
14:00

(1 BP) Rotherham Titans	31 – 20	Sale FC
	Report

Clifton Lane
Attendance: 687
Referee: Andrew Jackson

14 September 2019
14:30

Rams	25 – 21	Birmingham Moseley (1 BP)
	Report

Old Bath Road
Attendance: 572
Referee: Harry Walbaum

14 September 2019
15:00

(1 BP) Bishop's Stortford	27 – 36	Cambridge (1 BP)
	Report

Silver Leys
Attendance: 825
Referee: Jonathan Cook

14 September 2019
15:00

(2 BP) Canterbury	33 – 34	Blackheath (1 BP)
	Report

Marine Travel Ground
Attendance: 463
Referee: Calum Howard

14 September 2019
15:00

(1 BP) Cinderford	36 – 29	Plymouth Albion (2 BP)
	Report

Dockham Road
Attendance: 380
Referee: Greg MacDonald

14 September 2019
15:00

Hull Ionians	5 – 52	Darlington Mowden Park (1 BP)
	Report

Brantingham Park
Attendance: 228
Referee: Ben Rayner

14 September 2019
15:00

(1 BP) Old Elthamians	24 – 30	Rosslyn Park
	Report

College Meadow
Attendance: 348
Referee: Simon Harding

14 September 2019
15:00

Richmond	26 – 14	Chinnor
	Report

Athletic Ground
Attendance: 675
Referee: Ben Russell

=== Round 3 ===
21 September 2019
14:00

Sale FC	26 – 15	Old Elthamians
	Report

Heywood Road
Attendance: 388
Referee: Llyr ApGeraint-Roberts

21 September 2019
15:00

(1 BP) Birmingham Moseley	34 – 32	Bishop's Stortford (2 BP)
	Report

Billesley Common
Attendance: 616
Referee: Charlie Gayther

21 September 2019
15:00

(1 BP) Blackheath	19 – 20	Richmond
	Report

Well Hall
Attendance: 653
Referee: Richard Haughton

21 September 2019
15:00

(1 BP) Cambridge	15 – 19	Cinderford
	Report

Grantchester Road
Attendance: 390
Referee: James Clarke

21 September 2019
15:00

(1 BP) Chinnor	29 – 19	Hull Ionians
	Report

Kingsey Road
Attendance: 408
Referee: Nick Wood

21 September 2019
15:00

(1 BP) Darlington Mowden Park	7 – 11	Rams
	Report

Northern Echo Arena
Attendance: 857
Referee: Joe James

21 September 2019
15:00

(1 BP) Plymouth Albion	33 – 27	Rotherham Titans (1 BP)
	Report

Brickfields
Attendance: 964
Referee: Ben Russell

21 September 2019
15:00

(1 BP) Rosslyn Park	47 – 14	Canterbury
	Report

The Rock
Attendance: 600
Referee: Jonathan Cook

=== Round 4 ===
28 September 2019
14:00

Rotherham Titans	22 – 17	Cambridge (1 BP)
	Report

Clifton Lane
Attendance: 572
Referee: Ben Rayner

28 September 2019
14:30

(1 BP) Rams	27 – 21	Chinnor (1 BP)
	Report

Old Bath Road
Attendance: 621
Referee: Jonathan Cook

28 September 2019
15:00

(2 BP) Bishop's Stortford	30 – 31	Darlington Mowden Park (1 BP)
	Report

Silver Leys
Attendance: 350
Referee: Ben Wilde

28 September 2019
15:00

Canterbury	7 – 27	Sale FC (1 BP)
	Report

Marine Travel Ground
Attendance: 610
Referee: Daniel Collins

28 September 2019
15:00

(1 BP) Cinderford	20 – 27	Birmingham Moseley
	Report

Dockham Road
Attendance: 425
Referee: Dan Parrott

28 September 2019
15:00

Hull Ionians	7 – 52	Richmond (1 BP)
	Report

Brantingham Park
Attendance: 213
Referee: Llyr ApGeraint-Roberts

28 September 2019
15:00

Old Elthamians	27 – 20	Plymouth Albion (1 BP)
	Report

College Meadow
Attendance: 292
Referee: Calum Howard

28 September 2019
15:00

Rosslyn Park	14 – 29	Blackheath (1 BP)
	Report

The Rock
Attendance: 670
Referee: Joe James

=== Round 5 ===
5 October 2019
14:00

Sale FC	13 – 46	Rosslyn Park (1 BP)

Heywood Road
Attendance: 432
Referee: Ben Rayner

5 October 2019
15:00

Birmingham Moseley	15 – 11	Rotherham Titans (1 BP)

Billesley Common
Attendance: 775
Referee: Llyr ApGeraint-Roberts

5 October 2019
15:00

(1 BP) Blackheath	44 – 19	Hull Ionians

Well Hall
Attendance: 614
Referee: Andrew MacNeaney

5 October 2019
15:00

Cambridge	14 – 25	Old Elthamians

Grantchester Road
Attendance: 567
Referee: Charlie Gayther

5 October 2019
15:00

(1 BP) Chinnor	32 – 29	Bishop's Stortford (2 BP)

Kingsey Road
Attendance: 650
Referee: Ben Russell

5 October 2019
15:00

(1 BP) Darlington Mowden Park	26 – 27	Cinderford

Northern Echo Arena
Attendance: 777
Referee: Harry Walbaum

5 October 2019
15:00

(1 BP) Plymouth Albion	41 – 20	Canterbury

Brickfields
Attendance: 826
Referee: Alan Chandrachud

5 October 2019
15:00

(1 BP) Richmond	37 – 22	Rams

Athletic Ground
Attendance: 850
Referee: Calum Howard

=== Round 6 ===
12 October 2019
14:00

(1 BP) Rotherham Titans	13 – 18	Darlington Mowden Park

Clifton Lane
Attendance: 617
Referee: Ben Dixon

12 October 2019
14:00

(1 BP) Sale FC	43 – 18	Blackheath

Heywood Road
Attendance: 287
Referee: James O'Brien

12 October 2019
14:30

(1 BP) Old Elthamians	46 – 3	Birmingham Moseley

College Meadow
Attendance: 221
Referee: Jonathan Cook

12 October 2019
14:30

(1 BP) Rams	36 – 8	Hull Ionians

Old Bath Road
Attendance: 526
Referee: Dan Parrott

12 October 2019
15:00

(1 BP) Bishop's Stortford	17 – 18	Richmond

Silver Leys
Attendance: 547
Referee: Harry Walbaum

12 October 2019
15:00

Canterbury	7 – 34	Cambridge (1 BP)

The Marine Travel Ground
Attendance: 343
Referee: Alan Chandrachud

12 October 2019
15:00

Cinderford	23 – 31	Chinnor (1 BP)

Dockham Road
Attendance: 395
Referee: Sara Cox

12 October 2019
15:00

(1 BP) Rosslyn Park	33 – 17	Plymouth Albion

The Rock
Attendance: 650
Referee: Joe James

=== Round 7 ===
19 October 2019
15:00

Birmingham Moseley	25 – 21	Canterbury (1 BP)

Billesley Common
Attendance: 693
Referee: Jack Makepeace

19 October 2019
15:00

Blackheath	22 – 17	Rams (1 BP)

Well Hall
Attendance: 407
Referee: Nick Wood

19 October 2019
15:00

Cambridge	24 – 20	Rosslyn Park (1 BP)

Grantchester Road
Attendance: 522
Referee: James Clarke

19 October 2019
15:00

(2 BP) Chinnor	24 – 26	Rotherham Titans

Kingsey Road
Attendance: 512
Referee: Harry Walbaum

19 October 2019
15:00

(1 BP) Darlington Mowden Park	37 – 17	Old Elthamians

Northern Echo Arena
Attendance: 675
Referee: James O'Brien

19 October 2019
15:00

(2 BP) Hull Ionians	32 – 39	Bishop's Stortford (1 BP)

Brantingham Park
Attendance: 208
Referee: Timothy Allatt

19 October 2019
15:00

(1 BP) Plymouth Albion	33 – 22	Sale FC

Brickfields
Attendance: 840
Referee: Adam Wookey

19 October 2019
15:00

(1 BP) Richmond	14 – 19	Cinderford

Athletic Ground
Attendance: 738
Referee: Jonathan Cook

=== Round 8 ===
26 October 2019
14:00

Old Elthamians	20 – 8	Chinnor

College Meadow
Attendance: 174
Referee: Nick Wood

26 October 2019
14:00

Rotherham Titans	6 – 23	Richmond

Clifton Lane
Attendance: 517
Referee: Charlie Gayther

26 October 2019
14:00

Sale FC	20 – 3	Cambridge

Heywood Road
Attendance: 250
Referee: Llyr ApGeraint-Roberts

26 October 2019
15:00

Bishop's Stortford	21 – 11	Rams

Silver Leys
Attendance: 360
Referee: Alexis Manley

26 October 2019
15:00

(1 BP) Canterbury	13 – 17	Darlington Mowden Park

The Marine Travel Ground
Attendance: 356
Referee: Jonathan Cook

26 October 2019
15:00

Cinderford	P – P	Hull Ionians

Dockham Road

- Postponed due to adverse weather conditions (wind/rain). Game to be rescheduled for 22 February 2020.

26 October 2019
15:00

(1 BP) Plymouth Albion	21 – 26	Blackheath (1 BP)

Brickfields
Attendance: 972
Referee: Ben Russell

26 October 2019
15:00

Rosslyn Park	27 – 21	Birmingham Moseley (1 BP)

Priory Park
Attendance: 570
Referee: Calum Howard

=== Round 9 ===
2 November 2019
14:00

Cambridge	20 – 20	Plymouth Albion

Grantchester Road
Attendance: 352
Referee: Daniel Collins

2 November 2019
14:00

Hull Ionians	20 – 20	Rotherham Titans

Brantingham Road
Attendance: 411
Referee: James O'Brien

2 November 2019
14:30

Blackheath	19 – 14	Bishop's Stortford (1 BP)

Well Hall
Attendance: 312
Referee: Calum Howard

2 November 2019
14:30

(1 BP) Rams	29 – 7	Cinderford

Old Bath Road
Attendance: 356
Referee: Nick Wood

2 November 2019
15:00

Birmingham Moseley	29 – 24	Sale FC (1 BP)

Billesley Common
Attendance: 675
Referee: Ben Russell

2 November 2019
15:00

(1 BP) Chinnor	28 – 20	Canterbury

Kingsey Road
Attendance: 372
Referee: James Clarke

2 November 2019
15:00

(1 BP) Darlington Mowden Park	17 – 24	Rosslyn Park

Northern Echo Arena
Attendance: 1,000
Referee: Llyr ApGeraint-Roberts

2 November 2019
15:00

(1 BP) Richmond	25 – 12	Old Elthamians

Athletic Ground
Attendance: 685
Referee: Harry Walbaum

=== Round 10 ===
9 November 2019
14:00

(2 BP) Cambridge	24 – 25	Blackheath (1 BP)

Grantchester Road
Attendance: 488
Referee: Richard Haughton

9 November 2019
14:00

Cinderford	18 – 13	Bishop's Stortford (1 BP)

Dockham Road
Attendance: 185
Referee: Ben Russell

9 November 2019
14:00

(1 BP) Old Elthamians	31 – 0	Hull Ionians

College Meadow
Attendance: 210
Referee: Daniel Collins

9 November 2019
14:00

Rotherham Titans	16 – 28	Rams (1 BP)

Clifton Lane
Attendance: 483
Referee: Joe James

9 November 2019
14:00

Sale FC	18 – 8	Darlington Mowden Park

Heywood Road
Attendance: 450
Referee: Charlie Gayther

9 November 2019
15:00

Canterbury	0 – 50	Richmond (1 BP)

Merton Lane
Attendance: 363
Referee: Benjamin Wilde

9 November 2019
15:00

Plymouth Albion	19 – 7	Birmingham Moseley

Brickfields
Attendance: 1,104
Referee: Jonathan Cook

9 November 2019
15:00

Rosslyn Park	27 – 27	Chinnor

The Rock
Attendance: 570
Referee: Dan Parrott

=== Round 11 ===
16 November 2019
14:00

(1 BP) Hull Ionians	34 – 20	Canterbury

Brantingham Park
Attendance: 208
Referee: Llyr ApGeraint-Roberts

16 November 2019
14:00

Rams	10 – 23	Old Elthamians (1 BP)

Old Bath Road
Attendance: 531
Referee: Charlie Gayther

16 November 2019
15:00

Birmingham Moseley	10 – 45	Cambridge (1 BP)

Billesley Common
Attendance: 658
Referee: James Clarke

16 November 2019
15:00

Bishop's Stortford	30 – 14	Rotherham Titans

Silver Leys
Attendance: 425
Referee: Jonathan Cook

16 November 2019
15:00

Blackheath	13 – 27	Cinderford

Well Hall
Attendance: 279
Referee: Matt Rodden

16 November 2019
15:00

(1 BP) Chinnor	38 – 31	Sale FC (2 BP)

Kingsey Road
Attendance: 520
Referee: Daniel Collins

16 November 2019
15:00

(1 BP) Darlington Mowden Park	49 – 22	Plymouth Albion

Northern Echo Arena
Attendance: 693
Referee: Callum Howard

16 November 2019
15:00

(1 BP) Richmond	13 – 18	Rosslyn Park

Athletic Ground
Attendance: 1,495
Referee: Joe James

=== Round 12 ===
23 November 2019
14:00

Cambridge	17 – 17	Darlington Mowden Park

Grantchester Road
Attendance: 543
Referee: Harry Walbaum

23 November 2019
14:00

Old Elthamians	17 – 17	Bishop's Stortford

College Meadow
Attendance: 201
Referee: Joe James

23 November 2019
14:00

Rotherham Titans	7 – 30	Cinderford (1 BP)

Clifton Lane
Attendance: 471
Referee: Ben Rayner

23 November 2019
14:00

Sale FC	8 – 7	Richmond (1 BP)

Heywood Road
Attendance: 712
Referee: Richard Haughton

23 November 2019
15:00

(1 BP) Birmingham Moseley	5 – 9	Blackheath

Billesley Common
Attendance: 634
Referee: Nick Wood

23 November 2019
15:00

Canterbury	22 – 48	Rams (1 BP)

Merton Lane
Attendance: 364
Referee: Veryan Boscawen

23 November 2019
15:00

Plymouth Albion	10 – 10	Chinnor

Brickfields
Attendance: 986
Referee: James Milliner-Woodcock

23 November 2019
15:00

(1 BP) Rosslyn Park	36 – 8	Hull Ionians

The Rock
Attendance: 587
Referee: James Clarke

=== Round 13 ===
30 November 2019
14:00

(1 BP) Cinderford	24 – 18	Old Elthamians (1 BP)

Dockham Road
Attendance: 240
Referee: Benjamin Russell

30 November 2019
14:00

Hull Ionians	7 – 36	Sale FC (1 BP)

Brantingham Road
Attendance: 249
Referee: Ben Rayner

30 November 2019
14:00

(1 BP) Rams	27 – 20	Rosslyn Park (1 BP)

Old Bath Road
Attendance: 628
Referee: Harry Walbaum

30 November 2019
14:30

(1 BP) Bishop's Stortford	43 – 0	Canterbury

Silver Leys
Attendance: 425
Referee: Andrew MacNeaney

30 November 2019
15:00

(1 BP) Blackheath	33 – 17	Rotherham Titans

Well Hall
Attendance: 327
Referee: Alan Chandrachud

30 November 2019
15:00

(1 BP) Chinnor	34 – 22	Cambridge (1 BP)

Kingsey Road
Attendance: 440
Referee: Jonathan Cook

30 November 2019
15:00

(1 BP) Darlington Mowden Park	66 – 8	Birmingham Moseley

Northern Echo Arena
Attendance: 746
Referee: James O'Brien

30 November 2019
15:00

(2 BP) Richmond	30 – 31	Plymouth Albion (1 BP)

Athletic Ground
Attendance: 858
Referee: Charlie Gayther

=== Round 14 ===
7 December 2019
14:00

Cambridge	14 – 23	Richmond

Grantchester Road
Attendance: 567
Referee: Calum Howard

7 December 2019
14:00

(1 BP) Old Elthamians	46 – 18	Rotherham Titans

College Meadow
Attendance: 205
Referee: Charles Gayther

7 December 2019
14:00

(1 BP) Sale FC	19 – 26	Rams (1 BP)

Heywood Road
Attendance: 666
Referee: Ben Henderson

7 December 2019
15:00

(1 BP) Birmingham Moseley	17 – 22	Chinnor

Billesley Common
Attendance: 596
Referee: Ben Russell

7 December 2019
15:00

Canterbury	19 – 17	Cinderford (1 BP)

Merton Lane
Attendance: 327
Referee: James Clarke

7 December 2019
15:00

(1 BP) Darlington Mowden Park	34 – 17	Blackheath

Northern Echo Arena
Attendance: 711
Referee: Llyr ApGeraint-Roberts

7 December 2019
15:00

(1 BP) Plymouth Albion	37 – 31	Hull Ionians (2 BP)

Brickfields
Attendance: 1,019
Referee: Sam Phillips

7 December 2019
15:00

(1 BP) Rosslyn Park	38 – 16	Bishop's Stortford

The Rock
Attendance: 600
Referee: Alan Chandrachud

=== Round 15 ===
14 December 2019
14:00

(1 BP) Cinderford	3 – 8	Rosslyn Park

Dockham Road
Attendance: 325
Referee: Adam Wookey

14 December 2019
14:00

Hull Ionians	10 – 59	Cambridge (1 BP)

Brantingham Park
Attendance: 312
Referee: Hamish Grant

14 December 2019
14:00

(1 BP) Rams	44 – 14	Plymouth Albion

Old Bath Road
Attendance: 635
Referee: Veryan Boscawen

14 December 2019
14:00

Rotherham Titans	20 – 19	Canterbury (1 BP)

Clifton Lane
Attendance: 512
Referee: Tim Allatt

14 December 2019
15:00

(1 BP) Bishop's Stortford	26 – 19	Sale FC (1 BP)

Silver Leys
Attendance: 400
Referee: Alexis Manley

14 December 2019
15:00

(2 BP) Blackheath	25 – 31	Old Elthamians (1 BP)

Well Hall
Attendance: 1,225
Referee: Dan Parrott

14 December 2019
15:00

(1 BP) Chinnor	37 – 27	Darlington Mowden Park (1 BP)

Kingsey Road
Attendance: 300
Referee: Jonathan Cook

14 December 2019
15:00

(1 BP) Richmond	39 – 10	Birmingham Moseley

Athletic Ground
Attendance: 830
Referee: Joe James

=== Round 16 ===
21 December 2019
14:00

Cambridge	23 – 16	Bishop's Stortford (1 BP)

Grantchester Road
Attendance: 832
Referee: Benjamin Wilde

21 December 2019
14:00

(1 BP) Sale FC	49 – 7	Rotherham Titans

Heywood Road
Attendance: 324
Referee: Llyr ApGeraint-Roberts

21 December 2019
15:00

(1 BP) Birmingham Moseley	27 – 29	Rams (1 BP)

Billesley Common
Attendance: 882
Referee: Harry Walbaum

21 December 2019
15:00

(1 BP) Blackheath	28 – 17	Canterbury

Well Hall
Attendance: 967
Referee: Veryan Boscawen

21 December 2019
15:00

Chinnor	5 – 21	Richmond

Kingsey Road
Attendance: 625
Referee: Dan Parrott

21 December 2019
15:00

(1 BP) Darlington Mowden Park	92 – 7	Hull Ionians

Northern Echo Arena
Attendance: 800
Referee: Ben Rayner

21 December 2019
15:00

Plymouth Albion	5 – 18	Cinderford

Brickfields
Attendance: 1,217
Referee: Charles Gayther

21 December 2019
15:00

(1 BP) Rosslyn Park	33 – 20	Old Elthamians

The Rock
Attendance: 700
Referee: Nick Wood

=== Round 17 ===
4 January 2020
14:00

(1 BP) Cinderford	3 – 8	Cambridge

Dockham Road
Attendance: 284
Referee: Dan Parrott

4 January 2020
14:00

Hull Ionians	7 – 54	Chinnor (1 BP)

Brantingham Road
Attendance: 202
Referee: Timothy Allatt

4 January 2020
14:00

(1 BP) Old Elthamians	28 – 21	Sale FC (1 BP)

Meadow Lane
Attendance: 515
Referee: Harry Walbaum

4 January 2020
14:00

(1 BP) Rams	27 – 17	Darlington Mowden Park

Old Bath Road
Attendance: 552
Referee: Hamish Grant

4 January 2020
14:00

(2 BP) Rotherham Titans	32 – 38	Plymouth Albion (1 BP)

Clifton Lane
Attendance: 481
Referee: Llyr ApGeraint-Roberts

4 January 2020
15:00

(1 BP) Bishop's Stortford	29 – 15	Birmingham Moseley

Silver Leys
Attendance: 385
Referee: Joe James

4 January 2020
15:00

Canterbury	5 – 38	Rosslyn Park (1 BP)

Marine Travel Ground
Attendance: 600
Referee: Callum Howard

4 January 2020
15:00

Richmond	19 – 8	Blackheath

Athletic Ground
Attendance: 1,451
Referee: Nick Wood

=== Round 18 ===
10 January 2020
19:45

(1 BP) Chinnor	17 – 21	Rams

Kingsey Road
Attendance: 1,024
Referee: Ben Russell

11 January 2020
14:00

(1 BP) Cambridge	25 – 21	Rotherham Titans (1 BP)

Grantchester Road
Attendance: 523
Referee: Samuel Phillips

11 January 2020
14:00

(1 BP) Sale FC	33 – 14	Canterbury

Heywood Road
Attendance: 421
Referee: Ben Raynor

11 January 2020
15:00

(1 BP) Birmingham Moseley	35 – 15	Cinderford

Billesley Common
Attendance: 578
Referee: Nick Wood

11 January 2020
15:00

(1 BP) Blackheath	27 – 22	Rosslyn Park (1 BP)

Well Hall
Attendance: 627
Referee: Jonathan Cook

11 January 2020
15:00

Darlington Mowden Park	26 – 19	Bishops Stortford (1 BP)

Northern Echo Arena
Attendance: 867
Referee: Veryan Boscawen

11 January 2020
15:00

Plymouth Albion	21 – 10	Old Elthamians

Brickfields
Attendance: 939
Referee: James Milliner-Woodcock

11 January 2020
15:58

(1 BP) Richmond	86 – 7	Hull Ionians

Athletic Ground
Attendance: 704
Referee: Calum Howard

=== Round 19 ===
18 January 2020
14:00

Cinderford	20 – 14	Darlington Mowden Park (1 BP)

Dockham Road
Attendance: 328
Referee: Harry Walbaum

18 January 2020
14:00

Hull Ionians	P – P	Blackheath

Brantingham Park

- Game postponed due to the funeral of Hull Ionians player, Billy Hardy, who died on 28 December 2019 after falling ill following a gym workout. Game to be rescheduled for 14 March 2020.

18 January 2020
14:00

(2 BP) Old Elthamians	25 – 28	Cambridge (1 BP)

Meadow Lane
Attendance: 393
Referee: Andrew Wigley

18 January 2020
14:00

(1 BP) Rams	17 – 22	Richmond

Old Bath Road
Attendance: 1,131
Referee: Daniel Collins

18 January 2020
14:00

Rotherham Titans	22 – 20	Birmingham Moseley (1 BP)

Clifton Lane
Attendance: 541
Referee: Charles Gayther

18 January 2020
15:00

Bishop's Stortford	17 – 30	Chinnor (1 BP)

Silver Leys
Attendance: 350
Referee: Calum Howard

18 January 2020
15:00

Canterbury	5 – 52	Plymouth Albion (1 BP)

Marine Travel Ground
Attendance: 357
Referee: Jonathan Cook

18 January 2020
15:00

(1 BP) Rosslyn Park	40 – 21	Sale FC

The Rock
Attendance: 756
Referee: Nick Wood

=== Round 20 ===
25 January 2020
14:00

(1 BP) Cambridge	29 – 28	Canterbury (2 BP)

Grantchester Road
Attendance: 487
Referee: Joe James

25 January 2020
14:00

Hull Ionians	13 – 40	Rams (1 BP)

Brantingham Park
Attendance: 262
Referee: Timothy Allatt

25 January 2020
14:00

(1 BP) Plymouth Albion	41 – 22	Rosslyn Park

Brickfields
Attendance: 1,301
Referee: Daniel Collins

25 January 2020
15:00

(1 BP) Birmingham Moseley	22 – 23	Old Elthamians

Billesley Common
Attendance: 640
Referee: Veryan Boscawen

25 January 2020
15:00

(1 BP) Blackheath	48 – 29	Sale FC

Well Hall
Attendance: 567
Referee: Jonathan Cook

25 January 2020
15:00

(1 BP) Chinnor	28 – 27	Cinderford (2 BP)

Kingsey Road
Attendance: 375
Referee: Charlie Gayther

25 January 2020
15:00

(1 BP) Darlington Mowden Park	41 – 27	Rotherham Titans (1 BP)

Northern Echo Arena
Attendance: 855
Referee: Llyr ApGeraint-Roberts

25 January 2020
15:00

(1 BP) Richmond	51 – 10	Bishop's Stortford

Athletic Ground
Attendance: 882
Referee: Nick Wood

=== Round 21 ===
1 February 2020
14:00

Cinderford	10 – 25	Richmond (1 BP)

Dockham Road
Attendance: 285
Referee: Benjamin Russell

1 February 2020
14:00

(1 BP) Old Elthamians	28 – 26	Darlington Mowden Park (2 BP)

College Meadow
Attendance: 212
Referee: Joe James

1 February 2020
14:00

Rams	18 – 31	Blackheath (1 BP)

Old Bath Road
Attendance: 424
Referee: Nick Wood

1 February 2020
14:00

(1 BP) Rotherham Titans	24 – 42	Chinnor (1 BP)

Clifton Lane
Attendance: 464
Referee: Harry Walbaum

1 February 2020
14:00

(1 BP) Sale FC	26 – 25	Plymouth Albion (2 BP)

Heywood Road
Attendance: 388
Referee: James O'Brien

1 February 2020
15:00

(1 BP) Bishop's Stortford	40 – 22	Hull Ionians

Silver Leys
Attendance: 390
Referee: Dan Parrott

1 February 2020
15:00

Canterbury	13 – 29	Birmingham Moseley (1 BP)

Marine Travel Ground
Attendance: 296
Referee: Callum Howard

1 February 2020
15:00

(1 BP) Rosslyn Park	50 – 19	Cambridge

The Rock
Attendance: 628
Referee: Dean Richards

=== Round 22 ===
8 February 2020
14:00

(1 BP) Cambridge	37 – 31	Sale FC (2 BP)

Grantchester Road
Attendance: 468
Referee: Hamish Grant

8 February 2020
14:00

Hull Ionians	10 – 58	Cinderford (1 BP)

Brantingham Park
Attendance: 257
Referee: James O'Brien

8 February 2020
14:00

(1 BP) Rams	35 – 31	Bishop's Stortford (2 BP)

Old Bath Road
Attendance: 571
Referee: Charles Gayther

8 February 2020
14:30

(1 BP) Richmond	52 –20	Rotherham Titans (1 BP)

Athletic Ground
Attendance: 545
Referee: Veryan Boscawen

8 February 2020
15:00

Birmingham Moseley	19 – 31	Rosslyn Park (1 BP)

Billesley Common
Attendance: 800
Referee: Joe James

8 February 2020
15:00

Blackheath	29 – 19	Plymouth Albion

Well Hall
Attendance: 307
Referee: Adam Wookey

8 February 2020
15:00

(1 BP) Chinnor	33 – 3	Old Elthamians

Kingsey Road
Attendance: 252
Referee: George Selwood

8 February 2020
15:00

(1 BP) Darlington Mowden Park	64 – 14	Canterbury

Northern Echo Arena
Attendance: 479
Referee: Tim Wigglesworth

=== Round 23 ===
15 February 2020
14:00

Cinderford	P – P	Rams

Dockham Road

- Postponed. Game to be rescheduled for 14 March 2020.

15 February 2020
14:00

(1 BP) Old Elthamians	7 – 9	Richmond

College Meadow
Attendance: 188
Referee: Adam Wookey

15 February 2020
14:00

Plymouth Albion	P – P	Cambridge

Brickfields

- Postponed. Game to be rescheduled for 22 February 2020.

15 February 2020
14:00

(1 BP) Rotherham Titans	26 – 10	Hull Ionians

Clifton Lane
Attendance: 491
Referee: James O'Brien

15 February 2020
14:00

Sale FC	P – P	Birmingham Moseley

Heywood Road

- Postponed. Game to be rescheduled for 22 February 2020.

15 February 2020
14:00

Bishop's Stortford	10 – 10	Blackheath

Silver Leys
Attendance: 395
Referee: Ross Mabon

15 February 2020
15:00

(1 BP) Canterbury	0 – 7	Chinnor

Marine Travel Ground
Attendance: 350
Referee: Samuel Phillips

15 February 2020
15:00

(1 BP) Rosslyn Park	26 – 12	Darlington Mowden Park

The Rock
Attendance: 623
Referee: Jonathan Cook

=== Rounds 8 & 23 (rescheduled games) ===
22 February 2020
14:00

(1 BP) Plymouth Albion	49 – 10	Cambridge

Brickfields
Attendance: 835
Referee: James Milliner

- Game rescheduled from 15 February 2020.

22 February 2020
14:00

Sale FC	P – P	Birmingham Moseley

Heywood Road

- Game originally rescheduled from 15 February 2020 but postponed again due to poor weather. Game to be rescheduled for 12 March 2020.

22 February 2020
15:00

Hull Ionians	P – P	Cinderford

Brantingham Park

- Game rescheduled from 26 October 2019 but postponed again due to poor weather. Game to be rescheduled for 11 April 2020.

=== Round 24 ===
29 February 2020
14:00

Hull Ionians	6 – 26	Old Elthamians (1 BP)

Brantingham Park
Attendance: 219
Referee: Ben Rayner

29 February 2020
14:00

(1 BP) Rams	25 – 10	Rotherham Titans

Old Bath Road
Attendance: 523
Referee: Fergus Kirby

29 February 2020
15:00

Birmingham Moseley	14 – 26	Plymouth Albion (1 BP)

Billesley Common
Attendance: 816
Referee: Nick Wood

29 February 2020
15:00

Bishop's Stortford	P – P	Cinderford

Silver Leys

- Postponed due to bad weather. Game to be rescheduled for 2 May 2020.

29 February 2020
15:00

Blackheath	12 – 3	Cambridge

Well Hall
Attendance: 316
Referee: Jonathan Cook

29 February 2020
15:00

Chinnor	24 – 21	Rosslyn Park (1 BP)

Kingsey Road
Attendance: 725
Referee: Alexander Thomas

29 February 2020
15:00

(1 BP) Darlington Mowden Park	34 – 15	Sale FC

Northern Echo Arena
Attendance: 1,128
Referee: Adam Wookey

29 February 2020
15:00

(1 BP) Richmond	27 – 10	Canterbury

Athletic Ground
Attendance: 615
Referee: Daniel Collins

- Canterbury are relegated.

=== Round 25 ===
6 March 2020
19:45

Rosslyn Park	19 – 12	Richmond (1 BP)

The Rock
Attendance: 2,000
Referee: Alex Thomas

7 March 2020
14:00

Old Elthamians	15 – 31	Rams (1 BP)

College Meadow
Attendance: 181
Referee: Neil Chivers

7 March 2020
14:00

(2 BP) Rotherham Titans	24 – 31	Bishop's Stortford (1 BP)

Clifton Lane
Attendance: 462
Referee: Charlie Gayther

7 March 2020
14:00

Sale FC	22 – 19	Chinnor (1 BP)

Heywood Road
Attendance: 321
Referee: Llyr ApGeraint-Roberts

7 March 2020
15:00

Cambridge	13 – 12	Birmingham Moseley (1 BP)

Grantchester Road
Attendance: 481
Referee: Daniel Collins

7 March 2020
15:00

Canterbury	24 – 15	Hull Ionians

Marine Travel Ground
Attendance: 387
Referee: Joe James

7 March 2020
15:00

Cinderford	21 – 16	Blackheath (1 BP)

Dockham Road
Attendance: 145
Referee: Calum Howard

7 March 2020
15:00

(1 BP) Plymouth Albion	35 – 27	Darlington Mowden Park (1 BP)

Brickfields
Attendance: 920
Referee: Benjamin Russell

=== Rounds 19 & 23 (rescheduled games) ===
12 March 2020
19:45

(1 BP) Sale FC	26 – 10	Birmingham Moseley

Heywood Road
Attendance: 210
Referee: Neil Chivers

- Game originally rescheduled from 15 February 2020 and then again from 22 February 2020.

14 March 2020
14:00

Hull Ionians	17 – 64	Blackheath (1 BP)

Brantingham Park
Attendance: 176
Referee: Samuel Phillips

- Game rescheduled from 18 January 2020. Hull Ionians are relegated.

14 March 2020
15:00

(2 BP) Cinderford	38 – 40	Rams (1 BP)

Dockham Road
Attendance: 220
Referee: James O'Brien

- Game rescheduled from 15 February 2020.

=== Round 26 ===
21 March 2020
14:30

Rams	C – C	Canterbury

Old Bath Road

21 March 2020
15:00

Bishop's Stortford	C – C	Old Elthamians

Silver Leys

21 March 2020
15:00

Blackheath	C – C	Birmingham Moseley

Well Hall

21 March 2020
15:00

Chinnor	C – C	Plymouth Albion

Kingsey Road

21 March 2020
15:00

Cinderford	C – C	Rotherham Titans

Dockham Road

21 March 2020
15:00

Darlington Mowden Park	C – C	Cambridge

Northern Echo Arena

21 March 2020
15:00

Hull Ionians	C – C	Rosslyn Park

Brantingham Park

21 March 2020
15:00

Richmond	C – C	Sale FC

Athletic Ground

=== Round 27 ===
28 March 2020
14:00

Old Elthamians	C – C	Cinderford

College Meadow

28 March 2020
14:00

Rotherham Titans	C – C	Blackheath

Clifton Lane

28 March 2020
14:30

Sale FC	C – C	Hull Ionians

Heywood Road

28 March 2020
15:00

Birmingham Moseley	C – C	Darlington Mowden Park

Billesley Common

28 March 2020
15:00

Cambridge	C – C	Chinnor

Grantchester Road

28 March 2020
15:00

Canterbury	C – C	Bishop's Stortford

Marine Travel Ground

28 March 2020
15:00

Plymouth Albion	C – C	Richmond

Brickfields

28 March 2020
15:00

Rosslyn Park	C – C	Rams

The Rock

=== Round 28 ===
4 April 2020
14:00

Rotherham Titans	C – C	Old Elthamians

Clifton Lane

4 April 2020
14:30

Rams	C – C	Sale FC

Old Bath Road

4 April 2020
15:00

Bishops Stortford	C – C	Rosslyn Park

Silver Leys

4 April 2020
15:00

Blackheath	C – C	Darlington Mowden Park

Well Hall

4 April 2020
15:00

Chinnor	C – C	Birmingham Moseley

Kingsey Road

4 April 2020
15:00

Cinderford	C – C	Canterbury

Dockham Road

4 April 2020
15:00

Hull Ionians	C – C	Plymouth Albion

Brantingham Park

4 April 2020
15:00

Richmond	C – C	Cambridge

Athletic Ground

=== Round 8 (rescheduled game) ===
11 April 2020
14:00

Cinderford	C – C	Hull Ionians

Dockham Road

- Game rescheduled from 26 October 2019 and then 22 February 2020.

=== Round 29 ===
18 April 2020
14:00

Sale FC	C – C	Bishop's Stortford

18 April 2020
15:00

Birmingham Moseley	C – C	Richmond

Billesley Common

18 April 2020
15:00

Cambridge	C – C	Hull Ionians

Grantchester Road

18 April 2020
15:00

Canterbury	C – C	Rotherham Titans

Marine Travel Ground

18 April 2020
15:00

Darlington Mowden Park	C – C	Chinnor

Northern Echo Arena

18 April 2020
15:00

Old Elthamians	C – C	Blackheath

College Meadow

18 April 2020
15:00

Plymouth Albion	C – C	Rams

Brickfields

18 April 2020
15:00

Rosslyn Park	C – C	Cinderford

The Rock

=== Round 30 ===
25 April 2020
15:00

Bishop's Stortford	C – C	Plymouth Albion

Silver Leys

25 April 2020
15:00

Chinnor	C – C	Blackheath

Kingsey Road

25 April 2020
15:00

Cinderford	C – C	Sale FC

Dockham Road

25 April 2020
15:00

Hull Ionians	C – C	Birmingham Moseley

Brantingham Park

25 April 2020
15:00

Old Elthamians	C – C	Canterbury

College Meadow

25 April 2020
15:00

Rams	C – C	Cambridge

Old Bath Road

25 April 2020
15:00

Richmond	C – C	Darlington Mowden Park

Athletic Ground

25 April 2020
15:00

Rotherham Titans	C – C	Rosslyn Park

Clifton Lane

=== Round 24 (rescheduled game) ===
2 May 2020
15:00

Bishop's Stortford	C – C	Cinderford

Silver Leys

- Game rescheduled from 29 February 2020.

== Attendances ==
Club	Home games	Total	Average	Highest	Lowest	% Capacity
Birmingham Moseley	13	9,066	697	882	578	14%
Bishop's Stortford	11	4,852	441	825	350	28%
Blackheath	13	6,698	515	832	352	41%
Cambridge	13	6,217	518	832	352	23%
Canterbury	13	5,239	403	610	296	27%
Chinnor	12	6,203	517	1,024	252	26%
Cinderford	11	3,212	292	425	145	12%
Darlington Mowden Park	13	10,599	815	1,128	479	3%
Hull Ionians	12	2,945	245	411	176	16%
Old Elthamians	12	3,140	262	515	174	15%
Plymouth Albion	13	13,071	1,005	1,301	826	12%
Rams	12	7,070	589	1,131	356	47%
Richmond	12	7,449	621	756	495	31%
Rosslyn Park	13	9,449	727	2,000	495	36%
Rotherham Titans	12	6,298	525	687	462	21%
Sale FC	13	5,216	401	712	210	12%

== Individual statistics ==
- Note that points scorers includes tries as well as conversions, penalties and drop goals. Appearance figures also include coming on as substitutes (unused substitutes not included).

=== Top points scorers ===
Rank	Player	Team	Points
1	(South Africa) Warren Seals	Darlington Mowden Park	267
2	(England) Laurence May	Chinnor	164
3	(England) Chris Johnson	Sale FC	164
4	(England) Craig Holland	Rosslyn Park	163
5	(Scotland) Connor Eastgate	Plymouth Albion	151
6	(England) Mark Cooke	Blackheath	147
7	(England) Tom Hodgson	Richmond	146
8	(England) Sam Hollingsworth	Rotherham Titans	133
9	(England) Ben Penfold	Cambridge	130

=== Top try scorers ===
Rank	Player	Team	Tries
1	(England) Jake Lloyd	Blackheath	18
1	(England) Jason Worrall	Chinnor	18
2	(South Africa) Brandon Asher-Wood	Darlington Mowden Park	17
2	(England) Nick Selway	Chinnor	17
3	(England) Matt Hema	Cambridge	14
4	(England) Craig Holland	Rosslyn Park	13
4	(England) James Martin	Cambridge	13
4	(England) Jak Rossiter	Rams	13
4	(England) Jamie Salter	Plymouth Albion	13

== Season records ==
=== Team ===
Largest home win — 85 points

92 – 7 Darlington Mowden Park at home to Hull Ionians on 21 December 2019

Largest away win — 50 points

50 – 0 Richmond away to Canterbury on 9 November 2019

Most points scored — 92

92 – 7 Darlington Mowden Park at home to Hull Ionians on 21 December 2019

Most tries in a match — 14

Darlington Mowden Park at home to Hull Ionians on 21 December 2019
Richmond at home to Hull Ionians on 11 January 2020

Most conversions in a match — 11

Darlington Mowden Park at home to Hull Ionians on 21 December 2019

Most penalties in a match — 5 (6)

Old Elthamians at home to Plymouth Albion on 28 September 2019
Birmingham Moseley at home to Sale FC on 2 November 2019
Rosslyn Park at home to Chinnor on 9 November 2019
Birmingham Moseley at home to Rams on 21 December 2019
Sale FC away to Blackheath on 25 January 2020
Blackheath at home to Plymouth Albion on 8 February 2020

Most drop goals in a match — 1 (3)

Plymouth Albion at home to Canterbury on 5 October 2019
Sale FC at home to Rosslyn Park on 5 October 2019
Bishop's Stortford at home to Rams on 26 October 2019

=== Attendances ===
Highest — 2,000

Rosslyn Park at home to Richmond on 6 March 2020

Lowest — 145

Cinderford at home to Blackheath on 7 March 2020

Highest average attendance — 1,005

Plymouth Albion

Lowest average attendance — 245

Hull Ionians

=== Player ===
Most points in a match — 35

(South Africa) Brandon Asher-Wood for Darlington Mowden Park at home to Hull Ionians on 21 December 2019

Most tries in a match — 7

(South Africa) Brandon Asher-Wood for Darlington Mowden Park at home to Hull Ionians on 21 December 2019

Most conversions in a match — 9

(South Africa) Warren Seals for Darlington Mowden Park at home to Birmingham Moseley on 30 November 2019

Most penalties in a match — 5 (6)

(England) Tom White for Old Elthamians at home to Plymouth Albion on 28 September 2019
(South Africa) Clifford Hodgson for Birmingham Moseley at home to Sale FC on 2 November 2019
(England) Craig Holland for Rosslyn Park at home to Chinnor on 9 November 2019
(South Africa) Clifford Hodgson for Birmingham Moseley at home to Rams on 21 December 2019
(England) Chris Johnson for Sale FC away to Blackheath on 25 January 2020
(England) Mark Cooke for Blackheath at home to Plymouth Albion on 8 February 2020

Most drop goals in a match — 1 (3)

(England) Connor Eastgate for Plymouth Albion at home to Canterbury on 5 October 2019
(England) Chris Johnson for Sale FC at home to Rosslyn Park on 5 October 2019
(England) Bradley Burr for Bishop's Stortford at home to Rams on 26 October 2019

== See also ==
- 2019–20 National League 2 North
- 2019–20 National League 2 South
- English rugby union system
- Rugby union in England
