= Will Milner =

English rugby footballer

Personal information
- Full name: William Milner
- Born: 28 October 1994 (age 31)
- Height: 6 ft 2 in (188 cm)
- Weight: 13 st 6 lb (85 kg)

Playing information

Rugby league
- Position: Stand-off, Scrum-half
Club
Years	Team	Pld	T	G	FG	P
2015–16	Featherstone Rovers	20	6	0	0	24
2016(loan)	→ Keighley Cougars	8	2	0	0	8
2017	Keighley Cougars	13	2	0	0	8
	Total	41	10	0	0	40

Rugby union
Club
Years	Team	Pld	T	G	FG	P
2018	Huddersfield RUFC	0	0	0	0	0
- Source: As of 23 July 2021

Will Milner (born 28 October 1994) is a professional rugby union player who plays for Huddersfield in National League 2 North.

He signed for the club for the 2018–19 season having originally played rugby league for the Keighley Cougars in Kingstone Press League 1 where he was a stand-off or scrum-half.

Milner has previously spent time on loan at the Keighley Cougars in Kingstone Press League 1 and signed a two-year contract in October 2016. The contract was cancelled by mutual consent in August 2017.

He has previously played for Featherstone Rovers in the Kingstone Press Championship.
