= Jack Lea =

English rugby union player

Jack Lea (born 21 Dec 1994) is a current rugby union player who plays hooker for Stourbridge after leaving Championship side Moseley RFC.

In March 2023, Jack played his 150th match for Stourbridge.
