= 2022–23 National League 2 East =

Rugby union competition in England

- Countries: England; Guernsey
- Date: 3 September 2022 – 22 April 2023
- Champions: Blackheath (1st title)
- Runners-up: Barnes
- Relegated: Westcliff
- Matches played: 182
- Attendance: 69,388 (average 381 per match)
- Highest attendance: 1,537 – North Walsham v Rochford Hundred, 15 April 2023
- Lowest attendance: 70 – Barnes v Westcliff, 11 March 2023
- Tries scored: 1479 (average 8.1 per match)
- Top point scorer: 243 – Henry Anscombe (Dorking)
- Top try scorer: 35 – Tobermory McRae (Dorking)

The 2022–23 National League 2 East is the first season of the fourth-tier (east) of the English domestic rugby union competitions; one of three at this level. The others are National League 2 North and National League 2 West. Previously, there were two leagues at level four; National League 2 North and National League 2 South.

Blackheath became champions, with three matches to play, following their 93 – 17 defeat of Westcliff on 25 March 2023. Rochford Hundred and Westcliff are relegated to Regional 1 South East.

== Structure ==
The league consists of fourteen teams who play the others on a home and away basis, to make a total of 26 matches each. The champions are promoted to National League 1 and the bottom two teams are relegated to Regional 1 South Central or Regional 1 South East.

The results of the matches contribute points to the league as follows:

- 4 points are awarded for a win
- 2 points are awarded for a draw
- 0 points are awarded for a loss, however
- 1 losing (bonus) point is awarded to a team that loses a match by 7 points or fewer
- 1 additional (bonus) point is awarded to a team scoring 4 tries or more in a match.

=== Participating teams and locations ===
Locations of the 2022–23 National League 2 East teams

Team	Ground	Capacity	City/Area	Previous season
Barnes	Barn Elms	1,000	Barnes, London	Transferred from National League 2 South (11th)
Blackheath	Well Hall	1,650 (550 seats)	Eltham, London	Relegated from National 1 (15th)
Bury St Edmunds	The Haberden	3,000 (135 seats)	Bury St Edmunds, Suffolk	Transferred from National League 2 South (6th)
Canterbury	Marine Travel Ground	1,500 (75 seats)	Canterbury, Kent	Transferred from National League 2 South (12th)
Dorking	The Big Field	1,500	Dorking, Surrey	Promoted from London & South East Premier (runner-up)
Guernsey Raiders	Footes Lane	5,000 (720 seats)	Saint Peter Port, Guernsey	Transferred from National League 2 South (10th)
Henley Hawks	Dry Leas	4,000	Henley-on-Thames, Oxfordshire	Transferred from National League 2 South (8th)
North Walsham	Norwich Road	1,600	Scottow, Norfolk	Promoted from London & South East Premier (3rd)
Old Albanian	Woollam's Playing Fields	1,000	St Albans, Hertfordshire	Transferred from National League 2 South (9th)
Rochford Hundred	The Rugby Park	1,000	Hawkwell, Rochford, Essex	Transferred from National League 2 South (14th)
Sevenoaks	Knole Paddock	1,000	Sevenoaks, Kent	Promoted from London & South East Premier (champions)
Tonbridge Juddians	The Slade	1,500	Tonbridge, Kent	Relegated from National 1 (16th)
Westcliff	The Gables	1,000	Eastwood, Essex	Transferred from National League 2 South (15th)
Worthing Raiders	Roundstone Lane	1,500 (100 seats)	Angmering, West Sussex	Transferred from National League 2 South (4th)

=== League table ===
2022–23 National League 2 East table
Pos	Team	Pld	W	D	L	PF	PA	PD	TB	LB	Pts	Qualification
1	Blackheath (C, P)	26	23	0	3	1072	391	+681	20	2	114	Promoted
2	Barnes	26	19	0	7	860	462	+398	19	4	99	
3	Dorking	26	17	1	8	920	561	+359	19	6	95	
4	Worthing Raiders	26	18	0	8	897	677	+220	18	2	92	
5	Bury St Edmunds	26	18	0	8	792	621	+171	16	2	90	
6	Henley Hawks	26	17	0	9	741	602	+139	15	4	87	
7	Old Albanian	26	15	1	10	778	632	+146	18	2	82	
8	Tonbridge Juddians	26	15	0	11	681	591	+90	13	2	75	
9	Guernsey Raiders	26	9	1	16	711	741	−30	13	5	56	
10	Canterbury	26	9	0	17	671	798	−127	13	3	52	
11	Sevenoaks	26	6	2	18	551	716	−165	9	7	44	
12	North Walsham	26	8	0	18	620	916	−296	9	2	43	
13	Rochford Hundred (R)	26	5	1	20	512	974	−462	13	5	40	Relegated
14	Westcliff (R)	26	0	0	26	354	1478	−1124	4	2	1 (Note: Westcliff were deducted 5 points)	Relegated

Updated to match(es) played on 22 April 2023. Source: National League 2 East RFU
Rules for classification: If teams are level at any stage, tiebreakers are applied in the following order:
1. Number of matches won
2. Difference between points for and against
3. Total number of points for
4. Aggregate number of points scored in matches between tied teams
5. Number of matches won excluding the first match, then the second and so on until the tie is settled
  (C) Champion; (P) Promoted; (R) Relegated
  Notes:

== Fixtures & results ==
Fixtures for the season were announced by the RFU on 13 June 2022.

=== Round 1 ===
3 September 2022
14:00

(1 BP) Guernsey Raiders	25 – 27	Old Albanians

Footes Lane
Attendance: 271
Referee: Tom Bird

3 September 2022
15:00

(1 BP) Barnes	34 – 21	Worthing Raiders

Barn Elms
Attendance: 197
Referee: Veryan John Boscawen

3 September 2022
15:00

(1 BP) Blackheath	29 – 10	Dorking

Well Hall
Attendance: 623
Referee: Iain Kly

3 September 2022
15:00

(1 BP) Henley Hawks	19 – 24	Bury St Edmunds

Dry Leas
Attendance: 362
Referee: Daniel Colins

3 September 2022
15:00

North Walsham	22 – 38	Canterbury (1 BP)

Norwich Road
Attendance: 1,050
Referee: Jamie Parr

3 September 2022
15:00

(1 BP) Tonbridge Juddians	24 – 37	Rochford Hundred (1 BP)

The Slade
Attendance: 163
Referee: Peter Caunt

3 September 2022
15:00

Westcliff	12 – 29	Sevenoaks (1 BP)

The Gables
Attendance: 209
Referee: Jack Sutton

=== Round 2 ===
10 September 2022
14:00

Guernsey Raiders	17 – 32	Barnes (1 BP)

Footes Lane
Attendance: 845
Referee: Jack Sutton

10 September 2022
15:00

(1 BP) Bury St Edmunds	36 – 27	North Walsham

The Haberden
Attendance: 653
Referee: Peter Connor

10 September 2022
15:00

(1 BP) Canterbury	35 – 44	Tonbridge Juddians (1 BP)

Marine Travel Ground
Attendance: 401
Referee: Daniel Collins

10 September 2022
15:00

(1 BP) Dorking	44 – 24	Worthing Raiders (1 BP)

The Big Field
Attendance: 657
Referee: Michael Lamb

10 September 2022
15:00

Old Albanian	17 – 41	Henley Hawks (1 BP)

Woollam's Playing Fields
Attendance: 267
Referee: Jonathan Cook

10 September 2022
15:00

(1 BP) Rochford Hundred	29 – 27	Westcliff (1 BP)

The Rugby Park
Attendance: 342
Referee: Phil Russell

10 September 2022
15:00

Sevenoaks	P – P (Note: Match postponed due to the pitch being relaid in the summer and not ready due to the lack of rain.)	Blackheath

Knole Paddock

=== Round 3 ===
17 September 2022
14:00

Henley Hawks	28 – 24	Guernsey Raiders (2 BP)

Dry Leas
Attendance: 265
Referee: Michael Lamb

17 September 2022
15:00

(2 BP) Barnes	25 – 26	Dorking (1 BP)

Barn Elms
Attendance: 225
Referee: Simon Waite

17 September 2022
15:00

(1 BP) Blackheath	64 – 5	Rochford Hundred

Well Hall
Attendance: 413
Referee: Katherine Ritchie

17 September 2022
15:00

North Walsham	14 – 31	Old Albanian (1 BP)

Norwich Road
Attendance: 465
Referee: Peter Connor

17 September 2022
15:00

(1 BP) Tonbridge Juddians	36 – 17	Bury St Edmunds

The Slade
Attendance: 301
Referee: Connor Boyle

17 September 2022
15:00

Westcliff	14 – 34	Canterbury (1 BP)

The Gables
Attendance: 149
Referee: Veryan Boscawen

17 September 2022
15:00

(1 BP) Worthing Raiders	32 – 27	Sevenoaks (2 BP)

Roundstone Lane
Attendance: 605
Referee: Tom Bird

=== Round 4 ===
24 September 2022
15:00

(1 BP) Bury St Edmunds	38 – 28	Westcliff (1 BP)

The Haberden
Attendance: 321
Referee: Peter Caunt

24 September 2022
15:00

Canterbury	12 – 57	Blackheath (1 BP)

Marine Travel Ground
Attendance: 576
Referee: Philip Russell

24 September 2022
15:00

(1 BP) Guernsey Raiders	58 – 21	North Walsham

Footes Lane
Attendance: 500
Referee: Veryan Boscawen

24 September 2022
15:00

(1 BP) Henley Hawks	29 – 12	Barnes

Dry Leas
Attendance: 501
Referee: Katherine Ritchie

24 September 2022
15:00

(1 BP) Old Albanian	32 – 20	Tonbridge Juddians

Woollam's Playing Fields
Attendance: 247
Referee: Jamie Parr

24 September 2022
15:00

(2 BP) Rochford Hundred	28 – 33	Worthing Raiders (1 BP)

The Rugby Park
Attendance: 200
Referee: Jack Sutton

24 September 2022
15:00

(1 BP) Sevenoaks	26 – 26	Dorking (1 BP)

Sevenoaks School (Note: Match played at Sevenoaks School due to the pitch at Knole Paddock being relaid during the summer.)
Attendance: 178
Referee: Daniel Collins

=== Round 5 ===
1 October 2022
14:30

Tonbridge Juddians	20 – 10	Guernsey Raiders

The Slade
Attendance: 176
Referee: Jack Sutton

1 October 2022
14:30

Westcliff	12 – 38	Old Albanian (1 BP)

The Gables
Attendance: 217
Referee: Tom Bird

1 October 2022
15:00

(1 BP) Barnes	48 – 10	Sevenoaks

Barn Elms
Attendance: 207
Referee: Michael Lamb

1 October 2022
15:00

(1 BP) Blackheath	46 – 28	Bury St Edmunds (1 BP)

Well Hall
Attendance: 325
Referee: Peter Connor

1 October 2022
15:00

(1 BP) Dorking	59 – 24	Rochford Hundred (1 BP)

The Big Field
Attendance: 202
Referee: Veryan Boscawan

1 October 2022
15:00

(1 BP) North Walsham	29 – 23	Henley Hawks (1 BP)

Norwich Road
Attendance: 613
Referee: Peter Caunt

1 October 2022
15:00

(1 BP) Worthing Raiders	38 – 18	Canterbury

Roundstone Lane
Attendance: 211
Referee: Katherine Ritchie

=== Round 6 ===
15 October 2022
14:00

(1 BP) Guernsey Raiders	71 – 14	Westcliff

Footes Lane
Attendance: 426
Referee: Katherine Richie

15 October 2022
15:00

Bury St Edmunds	14 – 22	Worthing Raiders

The Haberden
Attendance: 311
Referee: Philip Russell

15 October 2022
15:00

(1 BP) Canterbury	10 – 12	Dorking

Marine Travel Ground
Attendance: 298
Referee: Michael Lamb

15 October 2022
15:00

Henley Hawks	23 – 10	Tonbridge Juddians

Dry Leas
Attendance: 275
Referee: Tom Bird

15 October 2022
15:00

North Walsham	10 – 36	Barnes (1 BP)

Norwich Road
Attendance: 473
Referee: Jack Sutton

15 October 2022
15:00

(1 BP) Old Albanian	24 – 19	Blackheath (1 BP)

Woollam's Playing Fields
Attendance: 352
Referee: Peter Connor

15 October 2022
15:00

(1 BP) Rochford Hundred	24 – 19	Sevenoaks (1 BP)

The Rugby Park
Attendance: 300
Referee: Peter Caunt

=== Round 7 ===
22 October 2022
14:30

(1 BP) Westcliff	24 – 38	Henley Hawks (1 BP)

The Gables
Attendance: 147
Referee: Peter Caunt

22 October 2022
15:00

Barnes	28 – 3	Rochford Hundred

Barn Elms
Attendance: 241
Referee: Tom Bird

22 October 2022
15:00

(1 BP) Blackheath	48 – 19	Gurnsey Raiders

Well Hall
Attendance: 530
Referee: James Dowds

22 October 2022
15:00

(1 BP) Dorking	16 – 17	Bury St Edmunds

The Big Field
Attendance: 826
Referee: Jack Sutton

22 October 2022
15:00

Sevenoaks	26 – 17	Canterbury

Knole Paddock
Attendance: 134
Referee: Ben Adams

22 October 2022
15:00

(1 BP) Tonbridge Juddians	45 – 7	North Walsham

The Slade
Attendance: 208
Referee: Katherine Richie

22 October 2022
15:00

(1 BP) Worthing Raiders	38 – 20	Old Albanian (1 BP)

Roundstone Lane
Attendance: 216
Referee: Michael Lamb

=== Round 8 ===
29 October 2022
13:30

(1 BP) Guernsey Raiders	36 – 31	Worthing Raiders (2 BP)

Footes Lane
Attendance: 900
Referee: Peter Caunt

29 October 2022
15:00

(1 BP) Bury St Edmunds	29 – 24	Sevenoaks (1 BP)

The Haberden
Attendance: 433
Referee: Tom Bird

29 October 2022
15:00

(1 BP) Canterbury	31 – 12	Rochford Hundred

Marine Travel Ground
Attendance: 301
Referee: Simon Waite

29 October 2022
15:00

Henley Hawks	6 – 15	Blackheath

Dry Leas
Attendance: 395
Referee: Jack Sutton

29 October 2022
15:00

(1 BP) North Walsham	49 – 5	Westcliff

Norwich Road
Attendance: 505
Referee: Veryan Boscawen

29 October 2022
15:00

(1 BP) Old Albanian	26 – 36	Dorking (1 BP)

Woollam's Playing Fields
Attendance: 341
Referee: Katherine Richie

29 October 2022
15:00

(1 BP) Tonbridge Juddians	35 – 22	Barnes (1 BP)

The Slade
Attendance: 273
Referee: Phillip Russell

=== Round 9 ===
5 November 2022
14:00

Westcliff	13 – 48	Tonbridge Juddians (1 BP)

The Gables
Attendance: 112
Referee: Peter Connor

5 November 2022
14:00

(1 BP) Worthing Raiders	26 – 30	Henley Hawks (1 BP)

Roundstone Lane
Attendance: 356
Referee: Philip Russell

5 November 2022
14:30

(1 BP) Barnes	37 – 26	Canterbury (1 BP)

Barn Elms
Attendance: 187
Referee: Katherine Price

5 November 2022
14:30

Sevenoaks	3 – 15	Old Albanian

Knole Paddock
Attendance: 350
Referee: Simon Waite

5 November 2022
15:00

(1 BP) Blackheath	50 – 3	North Walsham

Well Hall
Attendance: 400
Referee: Jamie Parr

5 November 2022
15:00

Dorking	17 – 13	Guernsey Raiders (1 BP)

The Big Field
Attendance: 556
Referee: Veryan Boscawen

5 November 2022
15:00

(1 BP) Rochford Hundred	17 – 23	Bury St Edmunds

The Rugby Park
Attendance: 275
Referee: Simon Waite

=== Round 10 ===
12 November 2022
14:00

(1 BP) Guernsey Raiders	28 – 28	Sevenoaks

Footes Lane
Attendance: Not recorded
Referee: Philip Russell

12 November 2022
14:00

Westcliff	14 – 53	Barnes (1 BP)

The Gables
Attendance: 138
Referee: Veryan Boscawen

12 November 2022
14:30

Tonbridge Juddians	21 – 20	Blackheath (1 BP)

The Slade
Attendance: 399
Referee: Jack Sutton

12 November 2022
15:00

(1 BP) Bury St Edmunds	31 – 17	Canterbury

The Haberden
Attendance: 319
Referee: Simon Waite

12 November 2022
15:00

(1 BP) Henley Hawks	24 – 28	Dorking (1 BP)

Dry Leas
Attendance: 327
Referee: Tom Bird

12 November 2022
15:00

North Walsham	20 – 34	Worthing Raiders (1 BP)

Norwich Road
Attendance: 372
Referee: Katherine Richie

12 November 2022
15:00

(1 BP) Old Albanian	54 – 20	Rochford Hundred

Woollam's Playing Fields
Attendance: 456
Referee: Peter Caunt

=== Rescheduled match ===
19 November 2022
14:30

Sevenoaks	11 – 52	Blackheath (1 BP)

Knole Paddock
Attendance: 327
Referee: Alan Chandrachud

=== Round 11 ===
26 November 2022
14:00

(1 BP) Worthing Raiders	46 – 34	Tonbridge Juddians (1 BP)

Roundstone Lane
Attendance: 465
Referee: Simon Waite

26 November 2022
14:30

(1 BP) Barnes	32 – 14	Bury St Edmunds

Barn Elms
Attendance: 78
Referee: Neil Sweeney

26 November 2022
14:30

(1 BP) Dorking	59 – 0	North Walsham

The Big Field
Attendance: 320
Referee: Jamie Parr

26 November 2022
14:30

Sevenoaks	28 – 24	Henley Hawks (1 BP)

Knole Paddock
Attendance: 316
Referee: Michael Lamb

26 November 2022
15:00

(1 BP) Blackheath	94 – 0	Westcliff

Well Hall
Attendance: 347
Referee: Philip Russell

26 November 2022
15:00

Canterbury	20 – 32	Old Albanian (1 BP)

Marine Travel Ground
Attendance: 295
Referee: Alex Rose

26 November 2022
15:00

(1 BP) Rochford Hundred	26 – 40	Guernsey Raiders (1 BP)

The Rugby Park
Attendance: 200
Referee: Katherine Ritchie

=== Round 12 ===
3 December 2022
14:00

Westcliff	15 – 69	Worthing Raiders (1 BP)

The Gables
Attendance: 98
Referee: Peter Buchanan

3 December 2022
14:30

(1 BP) Henley Hawks	32 – 22	Rochford Hundred (1 BP)

Dry Leas
Attendance: 225
Referee: Benjamin Sampson

3 December 2022
14:30

(1 BP) Tonbridge Juddians	26 – 19	Dorking (1 BP)

The Slade
Attendance: 246
Referee: James Dowds

3 December 2022
15:00

(1 BP) Blackheath	36 – 5	Barnes

Well Hall
Attendance: 390
Referee: Tom Bird

3 December 2022
15:00

(1 BP) Guernsey Raiders	34 – 17	Canterbury

Footes Lane
Attendance: 250
Referee: Peter Connor

3 December 2022
15:00

(1 BP) North Walsham	42 – 27	Sevenoaks (1 BP)

Norwich Road
Attendance: 244
Referee: Simon Waite

3 December 2022
15:00

(1 BP) Old Albanian	26 – 22	Bury St Edmunds (2 BP)

Woollam's Playing Fields
Attendance: 352
Referee: Jack Sutton

=== Round 13 ===
10 December 2022
13:30

Bury St Edmunds	P – P	Guernsey Raiders

The Haberden

10 December 2022
14:00

Worthing Raiders	P – P	Blackheath

Roundstone Lane

10 December 2022
15:00

Barnes	P – P	Old Albanian

Barn Elms

10 December 2022
15:00

(1 BP) Canterbury	14 – 19	Henley Hawks

Marine Travel Ground
Attendance: Not recorded
Referee: Jack Sutton

10 December 2022
15:00

Dorking	P – P	Westcliff

The Big Field

10 December 2022
15:00

Rochford Hundred	P – P	North Walsham

The Rugby Park

10 December 2022
15:00

Sevenoaks	5 – 17	Tonbridge Juddians

Knole Paddock
Attendance: 650
Referee: Alex Rose

=== Round 14 ===
17 December 2022
14:00

(1 BP) Barnes	26 – 14	Guernsey Raiders

Barn Elms
Attendance: 324
Referee: Katherine Richie

17 December 2022
14:00

(1 BP) Westcliff	16 – 22	Rochford Hundred (1 BP)

The Gables
Attendance: 512
Referee: Mike Lamb

17 December 2022
14:00

Worthing Raiders	P – P	Dorking

Roundstone Lane

17 December 2022
14:30

Tonbridge Juddians	P – P	Canterbury

The Slade

17 December 2022
15:00

Blackheath	P – P	Sevenoaks

Well Hall

17 December 2022
15:00

Henley Hawks	P – P	Old Albanian

Dry Leas

17 December 2022
15:00

North Walsham	P – P	Bury St Edmunds

Norwich Road

=== Round 15 ===
7 January 2023
14:00

Dorking	17 – 13	Barnes (1 BP)

The Big Field
Attendance: 365
Referee: Phil Russell

7 January 2023
14:00

(1 BP) Sevenoaks	19 – 21	Worthing Raiders

Knole Paddock
Attendance: 310
Referee: Michael Lamb

7 January 2023
15:00

(1 BP) Bury St Edmunds	31 – 10	Tonbridge Juddians

The Haberden
Attendance: 349
Referee: Tom Bird

7 January 2023
15:00

(1 BP) Canterbury	52 – 14	Westcliff

Marine Travel Ground
Attendance: 238
Referee: Jamie Parr

7 January 2023
15:00

(1 BP) Guernsey Raiders	26 – 27	Henley Hawks (1 BP)

Footes Lane
Attendance: 523
Referee: Simon Waite

7 January 2023
15:00

(1 BP) Old Albanian	31 – 7	North Walsham

Woollam's Playing Fields
Attendance: 421
Referee: Peter Caunt

7 January 2023
15:00

Rochford Hundred	10 – 31	Blackheath (1 BP)

The Rugby Park
Attendance: 220
Referee: Katherine Lamb

=== Round 16 ===
14 January 2023
14:00

(1 BP) Dorking	29 – 0	Sevenoaks

The Big Field
Attendance: 675
Referee: Jack Sutton

14 January 2023
14:00

North Walsham	20 – 12	Guernsey Raiders

Norwich Road
Attendance: 483
Referee: Mike Lamb

14 January 2023
14:00

Westcliff	12 – 63	Bury St Edmunds (1 BP)

The Gables
Attendance: 193
Referee: Katherine Richie

14 January 2023
14:00

(1 BP) Worthing Raiders	68 – 3	Rochford Hundred

Roundstone Lane
Attendance: 300
Referee: Jamie Parr

14 January 2023
14:30

(1 BP) Tonbridge Juddians	31 – 5	Old Albanian

The Slade
Attendance: 175
Referee: Tom Bird

14 January 2023
15:00

Barnes	31 – 21	Henley Hawks

Barn Elms
Attendance: 101
Referee: Peter Connor

14 January 2023
15:00

(1 BP) Blackheath	40 – 12	Canterbury

Well Hall
Attendance: 544
Referee: Peter Caunt

=== Round 17 ===
21 January 2023
13:30

(1 BP) Guernsey Raiders	25– 14	Tonbridge Juddians

Footes Lane
Attendance: 850
Referee: Tom Bird

21 January 2023
14:00

Old Albanian	P – P	Westcliff

Woollam's Playing Fields

21 January 2023
15:00

Bury St Edmunds	P – P	Blackheath

The Haberden

21 January 2023
15:00

(1 BP) Canterbury	43 – 33	Worthing Raiders (1 BP)

Marine Travel Ground
Attendance: 298
Referee: Katherine Richie

21 January 2023
15:00

Henley Hawks	P – P	North Walsham

Dry Leas

21 January 2023
15:00

Rochford Hundred	P – P	Dorking

The Rugby Park

21 January 2023
15:00

Sevenoaks	P – P	Barnes

Knole Paddock

=== Round 18 ===
28 January 2023
14:00

Westcliff	13 – 41	Guernsey Raiders (1 BP)

The Gables
Attendance: 107
Referee: Jack Sutton

28 January 2023
14:00

(1 BP) Worthing Raiders	29 – 22	Bury St Edmunds (1 BP)

Roundstone Lane
Attendance: 450
Referee: Philip Russell

28 January 2023
14:15

(1 BP) Dorking	50 – 21	Canterbury

The Big Field
Attendance: 350
Referee: Jamie Parr

28 January 2023
14:30

(1 BP) Tonbridge Juddians	17 – 24	Henley Hawks (1 BP)

The Slade
Attendance: 200
Referee: Michael Lamb

28 January 2023
15:00

(1 BP) Barnes	38 – 19	North Walsham

Barn Elms
Attendance: 324
Referee: Simon Waite

28 January 2023
15:00

(1 BP) Blackheath	33 – 21	Old Albanian

Well Hall
Attendance: 520
Referee: Tom Bird

28 January 2023
15:00

(1 BP) Sevenoaks	35 – 19	Rochford Hundred

Knole Paddock
Attendance: 340
Referee: Peter Connor

=== Rescheduled matches ===
4 February 2023
13:00

(1 BP) Bury St Edmunds	45 – 28	Guernsey Raiders (1 BP)

The Haberden
Attendance: 411
Referee: Paul Buchanan

4 February 2023
14:00

(2 BP) Barnes	33 – 40	Old Albanian (1 BP)

Barn Elms
Attendance: 169
Referee: Mike Lamb

4 February 2023
14:00

Worthing Raiders	20 – 28	Blackheath (1 BP)

Roundstone Lane
Attendance: 476
Referee: Alex Rose

4 February 2023
14:30

(1 BP) Dorking	108 – 3	Westcliff

The Big Field
Attendance: 300
Referee: Katherine Richie

4 February 2023
14:30

(2 BP) Tonbridge Juddians	29 – 31	Canterbury (1 BP)

The Slade
Attendance: 250
Referee: Phillip Russell

4 February 2023
15:00

(1 BP) Rochford Hundred	26 – 49	North Walsham (1 BP)

The Rugby Park
Attendance: 300
Referee: Nathan Howarth

=== Rescheduled matches (Round 14) ===
11 February 2023
14:00

(1 BP) Worthing Raiders	35 – 26	Dorking (1 BP)

Roundstone Lane
Attendance: 592
Referee: Tom Bird

11 February 2023
(1 BP) 15:00

Blackheath	36 – 12	Sevenoaks

Well Hall
Attendance: 440
Referee: Conor Boyle

11 February 2023
15:00

(1 BP) Henley Hawks	32 – 8	Old Albanian

Dry Leas
Attendance: 259
Referee: Jamie Parr

11 February 2023
15:00

North Walsham	12 – 47	Bury St Edmunds (1 BP)

Norwich Road
Attendance: 515
Referee: Jack Sutton

=== Round 19 ===
18 February 2023
15:00

(1 BP) Bury St Edmunds	47 – 44	Dorking (2 BP)

The Haberden
Attendance: 523
Referee: Alex Rose

18 February 2023
15:00

(1 BP) Canterbury	33 – 30	Sevenoaks (2 BP)

Marine Travel Ground
Attendance: 400
Referee: Jack Sutton

18 February 2023
15:00

Guernsey Raiders	7 – 17	Blackheath

Footes Lane
Attendance: 1,006
Referee: Michael Lamb

18 February 2023
15:00

(1 BP) Henley Hawks	73 – 13	Westcliff

Dry Leas
Attendance: 317
Referee: Neil Sweeney

18 February 2023
15:00

(1 BP) North Walsham	17 – 20	Tonbridge Juddians

Norwich Road
Attendance: 540
Referee: Katherine Richie

18 February 2023
15:00

(1 BP) Old Albanian	25 – 33	Worthing Raiders (1 BP)

Woollam's Playing Fields
Attendance: 221
Referee: Tom Bird

18 February 2023
15:00

Rochford Hundred	0 – 71	Barnes (1 BP)

The Rugby Park
Attendance: 200
Referee: Simon Waite

=== Round 20 ===
25 February 2023
14:30

(1 BP) Barnes	33 – 7	Tonbridge Juddians

Barn Elms
Attendance: 197
Referee: Jack Sutton

25 February 2023
14:30

(1 BP) Blackheath	50 – 28	Henley Hawks (1 BP)

Well Hall
Attendance: 455
Referee: Jamie Parr

25 February 2023
14:30

(1 BP) Dorking	36 – 24	Old Albanian (1 BP)

The Big Field
Attendance: 465
Referee: Phil Russell

25 February 2023
14:30

Rochford Hundred	28 – 26	Canterbury (2 BP)

The Rugby Park
Attendance: 300
Referee: Katherine Richie

25 February 2023
14:30

(2 BP) Sevenoaks	31 – 35	Bury St Edmunds (1 BP)

Knole Paddock
Attendance: 411
Referee: Michael Lamb

25 February 2023
15:00

Westcliff	15 – 57	North Walsham (1 BP)

The Gables
Attendance: 257
Referee: Alex Rose

25 February 2023
15:00

Worthing Raiders	59 – 12	Guernsey Raiders

Roundstone Lane
Attendance: 202
Referee: Simon Waite

=== Round 21 ===
4 March 2023
15:00

(1 BP) Bury St Edmunds	52 – 7	Rochford Hundred

The Haberden
Attendance: 423
Referee: Jack Sutton

4 March 2023
15:00

Canterbury	15 – 38	Barnes (1 BP)

Marine Travel Ground
Attendance: 150
Referee: Tom Bird

4 March 2023
15:00

(1 BP) Guernsey Raiders	31 – 27	Dorking (2 BP)

Footes Lane
Attendance: 953
Referee: Philip Russell

4 March 2023
15:00

(1 BP) Henley Hawks	24 – 34	Worthing Raiders (1 BP)

Dry Leas
Attendance: 325
Referee: Michael Lamb

4 March 2023
15:00

North Walsham	25 – 35	Blackheath (1 BP)

Norwich Road
Attendance: 507
Referee: Simon Waite

4 March 2023
15:00

(1 BP) Old Albanian	49 – 8	Sevenoaks

Woollam's Playing Fields
Attendance: 221
Referee: Jamie Parr

4 March 2023
15:00

(1 BP) Tonbridge Juddians	55 – 3	Westcliff

The Slade
Attendance: 115
Referee: Callum Watson

=== Round 22 ===
11 March 2023
15:00

(1 BP) Barnes	81 – 3	Westcliff

Barn Elms
Attendance: 70
Referee: Katherine Ritchie

11 March 2023
15:00

(1 BP) Blackheath	48 – 19	Tonbridge Juddians

Well Hall
Attendance: 386
Referee: Tom Bird

11 March 2023
15:00

Canterbury	11 – 28	Bury St Edmunds (1 BP)

Marine Travel Ground
Attendance: 400
Referee: Simon Waite

11 March 2023
15:00

(1 BP) Dorking	14 – 19	Henley Hawks

The Big Field
Attendance: 438
Referee: Jack Sutton

11 March 2023
15:00

Rochford Hundred	21 – 21	Old Albanian

The Rugby Park
Attendance: 250
Referee: Michael Lamb

11 March 2023
15:00

(1 BP) Sevenoaks	33 – 26	Guernsey Raiders

Knole Paddock
Attendance: 260
Referee: Philip Russell

11 March 2023
15:00

(1 BP) Worthing Raiders	57 – 22	North Walsham (1 BP)

Roundstone Lane
Attendance: 610
Referee: Jamie Parr

=== Rescheduled matches ===
18 March 2023
15:00

Bury St Edmunds	12 – 21	Blackheath

The Haberden
Attendance: 613
Referee: Jack Sutton

18 March 2023
15:00

(1 BP) Henley Hawks	42 – 40	North Walsham (2 BP)

Dry Leas
Attendance: 158
Referee: Peter Caunt

18 March 2023
15:00

(1 BP) Old Albanian	82 – 31	Westcliff (1 BP)

Woollam's Playing Fields
Attendance: 198
Referee: Simon Thwaite

18 March 2023
15:00

(1 BP) Rochford Hundred	27 – 41	Dorking (1 BP)

The Rugby Park
Attendance: 300
Referee: Phillip Russell

18 March 2023
15:00

Sevenoaks	12 – 28	Barnes (1 BP)

Knole Paddock
Attendance: 310
Referee: Alex Rose

=== Round 23 ===
25 March 2023
15:00

Bury St Edmunds	14 – 31	Barnes (1 BP)

The Haberden
Attendance: 411
Referee: Connor Boyle

25 March 2023
15:00

(1 BP) Guernsey Raiders	50 – 31	Rochford Hundred (1 BP)

Footes Lane
Attendance: 848
Referee: Simon Waite

25 March 2023
15:00

(1 BP) Henley Hawks	28 – 14	Sevenoaks

Dry Leas
Attendance: 254
Referee: Ben Wood

25 March 2023
15:00

North Walsham	19 – 48	Dorking (1 BP)

Norwich Road
Attendance: 532
Referee: Matt Sharpe

25 March 2023
15:00

(1 BP) Old Albanian	35 – 21	Canterbury

Woollam's Playing Fields
Attendance: 219
Referee: Jack Sutton

25 March 2023
15:00

(1 BP) Tonbridge Juddians	26 – 12	Worthing Raiders

The Slade
Attendance: 183
Referee: Michael Lamb

25 March 2023
15:00

Westcliff	17 – 94	Blackheath (1 BP)

The Gables
Attendance: 246
Referee: Peter Buchanan

=== Round 24 ===
1 April 2023
15:00

Barnes	21 – 10	Blackheath

Barn Elms
Attendance: 314
Referee: Philip Russell

1 April 2023
15:00

Bury St Edmunds	27 – 24	Old Albanian (2 BP)

The Haberden
Attendance: 435
Referee: Katherine Richie

1 April 2023
15:00

(1 BP) Canterbury	41 – 24	Guernsey Raiders (1 BP)

Marine Travel Ground
Attendance: 298
Referee: Callum Watson

1 April 2023
15:00

(1 BP) Dorking	44 – 24	Tonbridge Juddians

The Big Field
Attendance: 540
Referee: Simon Waite

1 April 2023
15:00

(1 BP) Rochford Hundred	17 – 22	Henley Hawks

The Rugby Park
Attendance: 250
Referee: Jamie Parr

1 April 2023
15:00

(1 BP) Sevenoaks	23 – 24	North Walsham

Knole Paddock
Attendance: 420
Referee: Jack Sutton

1 April 2023
15:00

(1 BP) Worthing Raiders	52 – 29	Westcliff (1 BP)

Roundstone Lane
Attendance: 150
Referee: James Dowds

=== Round 25 ===
14 April 2023
19:30

Guernsey Raiders	19 – 35	Bury St Edmunds (1 BP)

Footes Lane
Attendance: 873
Referee: Philip Russell

15 April 2023
15:00

(1 BP) Blackheath	54 – 5	Worthing Raiders

Well Hall
Attendance: 850
Referee: Jack Sutton

15 April 2023
15:00

(1 BP) Henley Hawks	33 – 24	Canterbury (1 BP)

Dry Leas
Attendance: 445
Referee: Nathan Howarth

15 April 2023
15:00

(1 BP) North Walsham	31 – 28	Rochford Hundred (2 BP)

Norwich Road
Attendance: 1,537
Referee: Iain Kiy

15 April 2023
15:00

(1 BP) Old Albanians	21 – 28	Barnes (1 BP)

Woollam's Playing Fields
Attendance: 237
Referee: Simon Waite

15 April 2023
15:00

Tonbridge Juddians	22 – 6	Sevenoaks

The Slade
Attendance: 1,010
Referee: Alex Rose

15 April 2023
15:00

Westcliff	7 – 46	Dorking (1 BP)

The Gables
Attendance: 244
Referee: Conor Boyle

=== Round 26 ===
22 April 2023
14:00

(1 BP) Old Albanian	48 – 21	Guernsey Raiders

Woollam's Playing Fields
Attendance: 237
Referee: Henry Pearson

22 April 2023
15:00

(1 BP) Bury St Edmunds	41 – 32	Henley Hawks (1 BP)

The Haberden
Attendance: 643
Referee: Connor Boyle

22 April 2023
15:00

(1 BP) Canterbury	52 – 38	North Walsham (1 BP)

Marine Travel Ground
Attendance: 917
Referee: Simon Waite

22 April 2023
15:00

(2 BP) Dorking	38 – 45	Blackheath (1 BP)

The Big Field
Attendance: 865
Referee: Jamie Parr

22 April 2023
15:00

(2 BP) Rochford Hundred	26 – 27	Tonbridge Juddians (1 BP)

The Rugby Park
Attendance: 300
Referee: Jack Sutton

22 April 2023
15:00

(1 BP) Sevenoaks	62 – 0	Westcliff

Knole Paddock
Attendance: 510
Referee: Michael Lamb

22 April 2023
15:00

Worthing Raiders	25 – 24	Barnes (1 BP)

Roundstone Lane
Attendance: 683
Referee: Alex Rose

== Attendances ==
Club	Home games	Total	Average	Highest	Lowest	% Capacity
Barnes	13	2,634	203	324	70	20%
Blackheath	13	6,223	479	850	325	29%
Bury St Edmunds	13	5,845	450	653	311	15%
Canterbury	12 (Note: There was no record of the attendance for Canterbury's home game versus Henley Hawks on 10 December 2022.)	4,572	381	917	150	25%
Dorking	13	6,559	505	865	202	34%
Guernsey Raiders	12 (Note: There was no record of the attendance for Guernsey Raiders home game versus Sevenoaks on 12 November 2022.)	8,245	687	1,006	250	14%
Henley Hawks	13	4,108	316	501	158	8%
North Walsham	13	7,836	603	1,537	244	38%
Old Albanian	13	3,769	290	456	198	29%
Rochford Hundred	13	3,437	264	342	200	26%
Sevenoaks	13	4,516	347	650	134	36%
Tonbridge Juddians	13	3,699	285	1,010	115	19%
Westcliff	13	2,629	202	512	98	20%
Worthing Raiders	13	5,316	409	683	150	27%

== Individual statistics ==
=== Top points scorers ===
Rank	Player	Team	Points
1	Henry Anscombe	Dorking	243
2	Benjamin Adams	Sevenoaks	219
3	Max Titchener	Henley Hawks	216
4	Charlie Reed	Bury St Edmunds	215
5	Matthew Hodgson	North Walsham	209
6	Matthew McLean	Worthing Raiders	208
7	Thomas White	Tonbridge Juddians	192
8	Tom Fftch	Blackheath	176
9	Tobermory McRae	Dorking	175

=== Top try scorers ===
Rank	Player	Team	Tries
1	Tobermory McRae	Dorking	35
2	Curtis Barnes	Worthing Raiders	28
3	Jake Lloyd	Blackheath	21
4	Anthony Armstrong	Guernsey Raiders	15
4	Jake Hennessey	Blackheath	15
5	Ethan Smith	Guernsey Raiders	14
5	Hugo Watson	Tonbridge Juddians	14
6	Benjamin Adams	Sevenoaks	13

== See also ==
- 2022–23 National League 1
- 2022–23 National League 2 North
- 2022–23 National League 2 West
