= Matthew McLean =

- Born: 8 December 1986 (age 39)
- Height: 5 ft 11 in (1.80 m)
- University: Cardiff Metropolitan University

Rugby union career
- Position: Full-Back, Fly Half
- Current team: Worthing Raiders
Senior career
Years	Team	Apps	(Points)
2004-05	Rumney	16	(180)
2005-08	UWIC		
2008	Manchester		
2008	Newport	4	(7)
2008	Cross Keys	1	(0)
2009-23	Worthing Raiders	308	(3038)
- Correct as of 28 April 2023
International career
Years	Team	Apps	(Points)
2014	Wales Sevens		

Matt McLean (born 1986) is a recently retired Welsh rugby union player who played for Worthing Raiders in National League 2 South and East. Known for both his try scoring and kicking prowess, as of the end of the 2022/23 season, his last before retirement, Matt was the most prolific points scorer in National League 2 South and National League 2 East history with over 3,000 points scored for Worthing, including three seasons as the division's top points scorer (another record), as well as being the division's 2nd highest try scorer of all-time with 173 tries. A former Wales youth international, he has also represented his country in rugby sevens.

In 2022, McLean was convicted of sexual assault and common assault following an incident in a Guernsey nightclub. He was sentenced to five months in prison, including three months specifically for the sexual assault.

== Career ==
=== Early career ===
Growing up in Cardiff, Matt attended Ysgol Gyfun Gymraeg Glantaf school. A promising youth rugby player with Wales Schoolboys and Bath Rugby under-17s, he first came to wider public attention in 2003 when he appeared as a competitor on the BBC's "Born to Win" program, although he was eliminated in the earlier rounds. Unable to break into the Bath team, Matt returned to club rugby in Wales, turning out for local side, Rumney, performing well enough for them to be called up by the Cardiff Blues under-20 side.

Between 2005-2008 Matt studied at UWIC, turning out for the university rugby side (which competed in the Welsh league system as well as against other universities) and also gained international caps with Wales Universities and Wales under-20s. He was part of the UWIC side that reached the BUSA Championship final in 2007 held at Twickenham, losing to champions Hartpury College, and was also awarded UWIC Player of the Year. In 2008 Matt had a brief dalliance with English rugby with Manchester before returning to Wales to play Premiership rugby for first Newport and then Cross Keys. Unable to gain regular rugby in Wales in January 2009 he returned to England, this time to the south coast, to sign for Worthing Raiders, playing in National Division 3 South.

=== Worthing Raiders ===
Despite joining halfway through the season, Matt had a positive impact on the Worthing side, newly promoted to the division, helping them to avoid relegation with a contribution of 58 points from 10 games. His next season (and first full season) saw Matt become a regular in the team as Worthing finished a respectable 6th in the division. The 2010-11 season saw Worthing finish in 8th place but Matt had the best scoring record of his career so far, with 339 points seeing him second in the scoring charts, only behind Ealing's Phil Chesters (who broke the English try scoring record with 70 tries). Matt would better his own record the next season, finishing top scorer in the division with 341 points, in a Worthing side that narrowly missed out on the promotion playoffs in 3rd place.

After several excellent seasons, in 2012, Matt suffered a broken fibula and dislocated ankle in a league match in November, which saw him out of action for 16 months, a spell that also saw he miss out on Worthing's promotion to National League 1 at the end of the season. Matt would return to league rugby at the tail-end of the 2013-14 season, in which Worthing were relegated from National League 1. At the start of the 2014-15 season he would be called up to the Wales Sevens team. He also returned to form with his club side, playing every game in the league and finishing second top scorer in the division with 298 points, including 18 tries, as they finished 5th.

2015-16 was a difficult one for Worthing as they finished 11th and Matt found points harder to come by (although he still got a respectable 154 points). This was repeated for 2016 as Worthing had to play until the last game to be sure of staying in the division, defeating already relegated Exmouth 50-5 to stay up, with Matt scoring 15 points including a try as Raiders finished in 12th place. Although the team was struggling Matt ranked 5th in the division scoring charts with 249 points.

The 2017-18 season saw an improvement in form for Worthing as they overcame a slow start to finish in 7th place, with Matt continuing to be prolific, finishing as the league's top scorer for the second time in his career, this time with 295 points, including 15 tries. The 2019-19 season was an outstanding one for McLean individually, as he finished as the top scorer in the division for a record breaking third time, equalling his career best tally of 341 points (equal with 2011-12), including a career best 22 tries - even more impressive as he starred in a mid-table Worthing side that finished 9th.

== Legal Issues ==
In October 2022, McLean was convicted in Guernsey of sexual assault and common assault following an incident that took place in the early hours of 1 May at Les Folies D’Amour nightclub. While visiting the island to play rugby, McLean grabbed a woman he did not know, pulled her to the floor, and simulated sex with her in front of other patrons. When her boyfriend confronted him, McLean headbutted him during the altercation and bit him on the hip, leaving visible injuries. McLean admitted to a further assault on the woman during the incident.

McLean was sentenced to three months in prison for the sexual assault and two additional months for assaulting the woman’s boyfriend, to be served consecutively. He received no separate penalty for the second assault on the woman, which he admitted. He was also ordered to pay £500 in compensation to the male victim and made subject to sexual offence notification requirements for five years.

Although McLean denied the charges and blamed excessive alcohol consumption, he expressed remorse through his legal counsel. He has since appealed the sexual assault conviction and both sentences. A £7,000 bond was posted, and McLean was granted bail while awaiting further appeal hearings.

== Season-by-season playing stats ==
Season	Club	Competition	Appearances	Tries	Drop Goals	Conversions	Penalties	Total Points
2004-05	Rumney	WRU League 2 East	14	14	0	32	12	170
2004-05	Rumney	WRU Challenge Cup	2	2	0	0	0	10
2005-06	UWIC	WRU Division 1						
2006-07	UWIC	WRU League 1 East						
2007-08	UWIC	WRU League 1 East						
2008-09	Manchester	National Division 1						
2008-09	Newport	Principality Premiership	4	1	0	1	0	7
2008-09	Cross Keys	Principality Premiership	1	0	0	0	0	0
2008-09	Worthing Raiders	National Division 3 South	10	4	0	10	6	58
2009-10	Worthing Raiders	National League 2 South	18	7	0	34	20	163
2010-11	Worthing Raiders	National League 2 South	27	11	0	67	50	339
2011-12	Worthing Raiders	National League 2 South	30	19	0	81	28	341
2012-13	Worthing Raiders	National League 2 South	9	4	0	22	4	76
2013-14	Worthing Raiders	National League 1	4	2	0	1	2	18
2014-15	Worthing Raiders	National League 2 South	30	18	0	74	20	298
2015-16	Worthing Raiders	National League 2 South	24	6	0	32	20	154
2016-17	Worthing Raiders	National League 2 South	30	9	1	51	33	249
2017-18	Worthing Raiders	National League 2 South	29	15	0	80	20	295
2018-19	Worthing Raiders	National League 2 South	30	30	0	84	21	341
2019-20	Worthing Raiders	National League 2 South	22	8	0	46	20	181
2021-22	Worthing Raiders	National League 2 South	28	15	0	76	16	277
2022-23	Worthing Raiders	National League 2 East	17	11	0	69	5	208

== Honours and records ==
=== Club ===
UWIC

- BUSA Rugby Union Championship Finals: 2007
- Leighton Davies player of the year: 2007

=== Individual ===
- Represented Wales at schoolboy, under-18 and under-19 levels
- Represented Wales Universities
- National League 2 South all-time top point scorer (3,028 points)
- National League 2 South top points scorer (3): 2011-12 (341 points), 2017-18 (295 points), 2018-19 (341 points)
