= 2021–22 National League 1 =

Rugby union competition in England

- Countries: England
- Date: 4 September 2021 – 7 May 2022
- Champions: Caldy (1st title)
- Runners-up: Sale
- Relegated: Blackheath; Tonbridge Juddians
- Matches played: 210
- Attendance: 118,763 (average 566 per match)
- Highest attendance: 3,023 – Caldy RFC v Sale FC, 23 April 2022
- Lowest attendance: 87 − Tonbridge Juddians v Cinderford, 2 October 2021
- Tries scored: 1461 (average 7 per match)
- Top point scorer: 248 – Benjamin Jones (Caldy)
- Top try scorer: 28 – Nathan Taylor (Cinderford)

2021–22 National League 1 is the twelfth season (34th overall) of the third tier of the English domestic rugby union competitions, since the professionalised format of the second division was introduced.

Caldy were crowned champions on 23 April 2022, following their final match of the season at home to runner-up Sale, beating them 13–9 in front of a club record attendance of 3,023. Next season they will be playing in the RFU Championship. Blackheath (14th position) and Tonbridge Juddians (15th) are relegated to National 2 East.

== Structure ==
The league initially consisted of sixteen teams, with all the teams playing each other on a home and away basis, to make a total of thirty matches each. Due to financial difficulties, Old Elthamians withdrew before the season started, reducing the league to fifteen teams. There is one promotion place, with the champions promoted to the RFU Championship. As the Championship consisted of just eleven teams this season, a second promotion place would have become available if the winner of the Championship, Ealing Trailfinders were promoted to Premiership Rugby. However this will not be the case as they were ineligible for promotion. There are usually three relegation places with the bottom three teams relegated to either National League 2 North or National League 2 South depending on the geographical location of the team. Due to Old Elthamians withdrawal, before the season started, there are only two relegation places.

The results of the matches contribute points to the league table as follows:

- 4 points are awarded for a win
- 2 points are awarded for a draw
- 0 points are awarded for a loss, however
- 1 losing (bonus) point is awarded to a team that loses a match by 7 points or fewer
- 1 additional (bonus) point is awarded to a team scoring 4 tries or more in a match.

== Participating teams and locations ==
2021–22 National 1 teams in England
2021–22 Greater London National League 1 clubs

Team	Ground	Capacity	City/Area	Previous season
Birmingham Moseley	Billesley Common	5,000 (1,300 seats)	Birmingham, West Midlands	13th
Bishop's Stortford	Silver Leys	1,600	Bishop's Stortford, Hertfordshire	11th
Blackheath	Well Hall	1,650 (550 seats)	Eltham, London	5th
Caldy	Paton Field	4,000	Thurstaston, Wirral, Merseyside	Promoted from N2N (1st)
Cambridge	Grantchester Road	2,200 (200 seats)	Cambridge, Cambridgeshire	10th
Chinnor	Kingsey Road	2,000	Thame, Oxfordshire	4th
Cinderford	Dockham Road	2,500	Cinderford, Gloucestershire	8th
Darlington Mowden Park	Northern Echo Arena	25,500	Darlington, County Durham	7th
Leeds Tykes	The Sycamores (Note: Leeds Tykes would also play one home game at Headingley Rugby Stadium on 8 January 2022)	1,500	Bramhope, Leeds, West Yorkshire	Relegated from the Championship
Plymouth Albion	The Brickfields	8,500	Plymouth, Devon	6th
Rams	Old Bath Road	2,000 (300 seats)	Sonning, Reading, Berkshire	2nd
Rosslyn Park	The Rock	2,000 (630 seats)	Roehampton, London	3rd
Sale FC	Heywood Road	3,387	Sale, Greater Manchester	12th
Taunton Titans	Towergate Stadium	2,000 (198 seats)	Taunton, Somerset	Promoted from N2S (1st)
Tonbridge Juddians	The Slade	1,500	Tonbridge, Kent	Promoted from N2S (2nd)

== League table ==
2021–22 National League 1 table
Pos	Team	Pld	W	D	L	PF	PA	PD	TB	LB	Pts	Qualification
1	Caldy	28	23	2	3	752	538	+214	14	1	111	Promoted to the RFU Championship
2	Sale FC	28	22	0	6	812	558	+254	14	4	106	
3	Rosslyn Park	28	19	1	8	869	556	+313	18	6	102	
4	Cambridge	28	18	3	7	762	548	+214	18	3	99	
5	Cinderford	28	18	1	9	802	586	+216	15	7	96	
6	Rams	28	17	0	11	718	600	+118	15	7	90	
7	Chinnor	28	12	1	15	757	770	−13	18	7	70 (Note: 5 points deducted)	
8	Taunton Titans	28	10	2	16	741	952	−211	17	4	65	
9	Bishop's Stortford	28	10	2	16	651	686	−35	12	6	62	
10	Birmingham Moseley	28	12	0	16	549	732	−183	9	4	61	
11	Plymouth Albion	28	9	1	18	684	779	−95	15	7	60	
12	Darlington Mowden Park	28	11	1	16	656	763	−107	8	5	59	
13	Leeds Tykes	28	9	1	18	635	789	−154	12	9	59	
14	Blackheath	28	7	0	21	580	712	−132	7	15	50	Relegation place
15	Tonbridge Juddians	28	5	1	22	517	916	−399	5	8	35	Relegation place

Updated to match(es) played on 1 June 2022. Source: "National League 1". RFU.
Rules for classification: If teams are level at any stage, tiebreakers are applied in the following order:
1. Number of matches won
2. Difference between points for and against
3. Total number of points for
4. Aggregate number of points scored in matches between tied teams
5. Number of matches won excluding the first match, then the second and so on until the tie is settled
  Notes:

== Fixtures & results ==
Fixtures for the season were announced by the RFU on 4 May 2021.

=== Round 1 ===
4 September 2021
15:00

Birmingham Moseley	23 – 22	Darlington Mowden Park (1 BP)

Billesley Common
Attendance: 701
Referee: Llyr Ap Geraint Roberts

4 September 2021
15:00

(1 BP) Blackheath	15 – 18	Cinderford

Well Hall
Attendance: 720
Referee: Jonathan Cook

4 September 2021
15:00

(2 BP) Cambridge	28 – 34	Rams (1 BP)

Grantchester Road
Attendance: 369

4 September 2021
15:00

(1 BP) Chinnor	34 – 21	Sale FC

Kingsey Road
Attendance: 420
Referee: Alan Chandrachud

4 September 2021
15:00

(1 BP) Leeds Tykes	29 – 41	Taunton Titans (1 BP)

The Sycamores
Attendance: 320
Referee: James O'Brien

4 September 2021
15:00

Plymouth Albion	7 – 38	Rosslyn Park (1 BP)

Brickfields
Attendance: 2,088
Referee: Charlie Gaithersburg

4 September 2021
15:00

Tonbridge Juddians	18 – 18	Bishop's Stortford

The Slade
Attendance: 321

Bye/s: Caldy

=== Round 2 ===
11 September 2021
14:30

Sale FC	15 – 7	Cambridge (1 BP)

Heywood Road
Attendance: 432
Referee: Harry Walbaum

11 September 2021
15:00

Birmingham Moseley	22 – 20	Blackheath (1 BP)

Billesley Common
Attendance: 971
Referee: Andy Wigley

11 September 2021
15:00

Bishop's Stortford (1 BP)	32 – 19	Plymouth Albion

Silver Leys
Attendance: 511
Referee: Veryan Boscawen

11 September 2021
15:00

Cinderford (1 BP)	29 – 21	Caldy

Dockham Road
Attendance: 390
Referee: Dan Jones

11 September 2021
15:00

Darlington Mowden Park (2 BP)	32 – 38	Taunton Titans (1 BP)

Northern Echo Arena
Attendance: 782
Referee: Adam Wookey

11 September 2021
15:00

Rams (1 BP)	24 – 13	Tonbridge Juddians

Old Bath Road
Attendance: 369
Referee: Callum Howard

11 September 2021
15:00

Rosslyn Park (1 BP)	60 – 10	Leeds Tykes

The Rock
Attendance: 600
Referee: Jonathan Cook

Bye/s: Chinnor

=== Round 3 ===
18 September 2021
15:00

Blackheath	23 – 14	Darlington Mowden Park

Well Hall
Attendance: 431
Referee: Hamish Grant

18 September 2021
15:00

Caldy	0 – 24	Birmingham Moseley

Paton Field
Attendance: 567
Referee: Ben Davis

18 September 2021
15:00

(1 BP) Chinnor	28 – 33	Cinderford (1 BP)

Kingsey Road
Attendance: 605
Referee: Calum Howard

18 September 2021
15:00

(1 BP) Leeds Tykes	33 – 25	Bishop's Stortford

The Sycamores
Attendance: 330
Referee: Tim Allat

18 September 2021
15:00

(1 BP) Plymouth Albion	19 – 26	Rams (1 BP)

Brickfields
Attendance: 1,237
Referee: Adam Wookey

18 September 2021
15:00

Taunton Titans	14 – 40	Rosslyn Park (1 BP)

Towergate Stadium
Attendance: 850
Referee: Daniel Rowlands

18 September 2021
15:00

(1 BP) Tonbridge Juddians	30 – 21	Sale FC

The Slade
Attendance: 187
Referee: Alan Chandrachud

Bye/s: Cambridge

=== Round 4 ===
25 September 2021
14:30

(1 BP) Sale FC	38 – 27	Plymouth Albion (1 BP)

Heywood Road
Attendance: 827
Referee: James O'Btirn

25 September 2021
15:00

(1 BP) Birmingham Moseley	22 – 29	Chinnor (1 BP)

Billesley Common
Attendance: 577
Referee: Hamish

25 September 2021
15:00

Bishop's Stortford	26 – 22	Taunton Titans (2 BP)

Silver Leys
Attendance: 410
Referee: Harry Walbaum

25 September 2021
15:00

(1 BP) Blackheath	16 – 18	Caldy

Well Hall
Attendance: 521
Referee: Ben Rayner

25 September 2021
15:00

(1 BP) Cinderford	41 – 26	Cambridge (1 BP)

Dockham Road
Attendance: 412
Referee: Bryan Wookey

25 September 2021
15:00

(1 BP) Darlington Mowden Park	17 – 18	Rosslyn Park

Northern Echo Arena
Attendance: 763
Referee: Jonathan Cook

25 September 2021
15:00

(1 BP) Rams	29 – 11	Leeds Tykes

Old Bath Road
Attendance: 602
Referee: Charles Gayther

Bye/s: Tonbridge Juddians

=== Round 5 ===
2 October 2021
15:00

Caldy	27– 22	Darlington Mowden Park (1 BP)

Paton Field
Attendance: 312
Referee: James O'Brien

2 October 2021
15:00

(1 BP) Cambridge	32 – 7	Birmingham Moseley

Grantchester Road
Attendance: 339
Referee: Veryan Boscawen

2 October 2021
15:00

(1 BP) Chinnor	34 – 21	Blackheath (1 BP)

Kingsey Road
Attendance: 340
Referee: Dan Jones

2 October 2021
15:00

Sale FC	21 – 17	Leeds Tykes (1 BP)

Heywood Road
Attendance: 622
Referee: Ben Rayner

2 October 2021
15:00

(1 BP) Rosslyn Park	14 – 13	Bishop's Stortford

The Rock
Attendance: 600
Referee: Calum Howard

2 October 2021
15:00

Taunton Titans	18 – 17	Rams (1 BP)

Towergate Stadium
Attendance: 506
Referee: Adam Bryan Wookey

2 October 2021
15:00

Tonbridge Juddians	12 – 21	Cinderford

The Slade
Attendance: 87
Referee: Hamish Grant

Bye/s: Plymouth Albion

=== Round 6 ===
9 October 2021
14:30

(1 BP) Sale FC	53 – 28	Taunton Titans (1 BP)

Heywood Road
Attendance: 678
Referee: Timothy Allatt

9 October 2021
15:00

(1 BP) Birmingham Moseley	34 – 21	Tonbridge Juddians

Billesley Common
Attendance: 701
Referee: Dan Rowlands

9 October 2021
15:00

(1 BP) Blackheath	9 – 15	Cambridge

Well Hall
Attendance: 659
Referee: Dr Jonathan Cook

9 October 2021
15:00

Caldy	27 – 24	Chinnor (2 BP)

Paton Field
Attendance: 361
Referee: Ben Rayner

9 October 2021
15:00

(1 BP) Cinderford	36 – 12	Plymouth Albion

Dockham Road
Attendance: 505
Referee: Adam Wookey

9 October 2021
15:00

(1 BP) Darlington Mowden Park	33 – 22	Bishop's Stortford (1 BP)

Northern Echo Arena
Attendance: 813
Referee: Llyr ApGeraint-Roberts

9 October 2021
15:00

Rams	24 – 21	Rosslyn Park (1 BP)

Old Bath Road
Attendance: 986
Referee: Dan Jones

Bye/s: Leeds Tykes

=== Round 7 ===
16 October 2021
15:00

(1 BP) Bishop's Stortford	19 – 21	Rams

Silver Leys
Attendance: 405
Referee: Veryan Boscawen

16 October 2021
15:00

Cambridge	22 – 22	Caldy

Grantchester Road
Attendance: 433
Referee: Dan Jones

16 October 2021
15:00

(1 BP) Chinnor	20 – 23	Darlington Mowden Park

Kingsey Road
Attendance: 407
Referee: Calum Howard

16 October 2021
15:00

(1 BP) Cinderford	50 – 12	Leeds Tykes

Dockham Road
Attendance: 517
Referee: Hamish Grant

16 October 2021
15:00

(1 BP) Plymouth Albion	34 – 12	Birmingham Moseley

Brickfields
Attendance: 1,355
Referee: Charlie Gather

16 October 2021
15:00

Rosslyn Park	20 – 15	Sale FC (1 BP)

The Rock
Attendance: 570
Referee: Charlie Gather

16 October 2021
15:00

(1 BP) Tonbridge Juddians	21 – 23	Blackheath

The Slade
Attendance: 561
Referee: Jonathan Cook

Bye/s: Taunton Titans

=== Round 8 ===
23 October 2021
14:30

(1 BP) Sale FC	32 – 24	Bishop's Stortford

Heywood Road
Attendance: 500
Referee: Andrew Wigley

23 October 2021
15:00

(1 BP) Birmingham Moseley	33 – 32	Leeds Tykes (2 BP)

Billesley Common
Attendance: 769
Referee: Dan Jones

23 October 2021
15:00

(2 BP) Blackheath	30 – 36	Plymouth Albion (1 BP)

Well Hall
Attendance: 512
Referee: Calum Howard

23 October 2021
15:00

(1 BP) Caldy (2 BP)	47 – 40	Tonbridge Juddians (2 BP)

Paton Field
Attendance: 298
Referee: Hamish Grant

23 October 2021
15:00

(2 BP) Chinnor	30 – 32	Cambridge (1 BP)

Kingsey Road
Attendance: 400
Referee: Harry Walbaum

23 October 2021
15:00

(1 BP) Cinderford	26 – 21	Taunton Titans (1 BP)

Dockham Road
Attendance: 390
Referee: Veryan Boscawen

23 October 2021
15:00

(1 BP) Darlington Mowden Park	29 – 23	Rams (2 BP)

Northern Echo Arena
Attendance: 913
Referee: Ben Rayner

Bye/s: Rosslyn Park

=== Round 9 ===
30 October 2021
15:00

(1 BP) Cambridge	26 – 26	Darlington Mowden Park (1 BP)

Grantchester Road
Attendance: 390
Referee: Calum Howard

30 October 2021
15:00

Leeds Tykes	P – P	Blackheath

The Sycamores

30 October 2021
15:00

Plymouth Albion	7 – 26	Caldy (1 BP)

Brickfields
Attendance: 1,025
Referee: Dan Jones

30 October 2021
15:00

Rams	21 – 32	Sale FC (1 BP)

Old Bath Road
Attendance: 771
Referee: Paul Williams

30 October 2021
15:00

(1 BP) Rosslyn Park	38 – 31	Cinderford (2 BP)

The Rock
Attendance: 540
Referee: Harry Walbaum

30 October 2021
15:00

Taunton Titans	P – P (Note: Match postponed due to Covid-19)	Birmingham Moseley

Towergate Stadium

30 October 2021
15:00

Tonbridge Juddians	15 – 34	Chinnor (1 BP)

The Slade
Attendance: 257
Referee: Veryan Boscawen

Bye/s: Bishop's Stortford

=== Round 9 (rescheduled matches) ===
6 November 2021
14:30

(1 BP) Leeds Tykes	27 – 25	Blackheath (2 BP)

The Sycamores
Attendance: 480
Referee: James O'Brien

6 November 2021
15:00

Taunton Titans	22 – 19	Birmingham Moseley (1 BP)

Towergate Stadium
Attendance: 430
Referee: Daniel Rowlands

=== Round 10 ===
13 November 2021
14:00

(1 BP) Caldy	31 – 28	Leeds Tykes (2 BP)

Paton Field
Attendance: 412
Referee: James O'Brien

13 November 2021
14:00

(1 BP) Cambridge	45 – 14	Tonbridge Juddians

Granchester Road
Attendance: 437
Referee: Owen Taylor

13 November 2021
14:30

(1 BP) Blackheath	42 – 19	Taunton Titans

Well Hall
Attendance: 525
Referee: Calum Howard

13 November 2021
15:00

Birmingham Moseley	8 – 29	Rosslyn Park (1 BP)

Billesley Common
Attendance: 643
Referee: Llyr ApGeraint-Roberts

13 November 2021
15:00

(2 BP) Chinnor	36 – 41	Plymouth Albion (1 BP)

Kingsey Road
Attendance: 400
Referee: Veryan Boscawen

13 November 2021
15:00

(1 BP) Cinderford	55 – 39	Bishop's Stortford (1 BP)

Dockham Road
Attendance: 355
Referee: Alan Chandrachud

13 November 2021
15:00

Darlington Mowden Park	15 – 32	Sale FC (1 BP)

Northern Echo Arena
Attendance: 912
Referee: Timothy Allatt

Bye/s: Rams

=== Round 11 ===
19 November 2021
20:00

(1 BP) Rosslyn Park	55 – 14	Blackheath

The Rock
Attendance: 743
Referee: Hamish Grant

20 November 2021
12:30

Leeds Tykes	12 – 29	Chinnor (1 BP)

The Sycamores
Attendance: 290
Referee: Timothy Allatt

20 November 2021
14:00

Plymouth Albion	0 – 17	Cambridge

Brickfields
Attendance: 864
Referee: Adam Wookey

20 November 2021
14:30

(2 BP) Tonbridge Juddians	24 – 30	Darlington Mowden Park

The Slade
Attendance: 233
Referee: Callum Howard

20 November 2021
15:00

(1 BP) Bishop's Stortford	33 – 3	Birmingham Moseley

Silver Leys
Attendance: 400
Referee: Owen Taylor

20 November 2021
15:00

Rams	22 – 20	Cinderford (1 BP)

Old Bath Road
Attendance: 698
Referee: Neil Chivers

20 November 2021
15:00

(2 BP) Taunton Titans	31 – 36	Caldy (1 BP)

Towergate Stadium
Attendance: 702
Referee: Daniel Rowlands

Bye/s: Sale FC

=== Round 12 ===
27 November 2021
14:00

(1 BP) Caldy	20 – 26	Rosslyn Park (1 BP)

Paton Field
Attendance: 505
Referee: Timothy Allatt

27 November 2021
14:00

(1 BP) Cambridge	15 – 17	Leeds Tykes

Grantchester Road
Attendance: 807
Referee: Calum Howard

27 November 2021
14:00

Tonbridge Juddians	12 – 10	Plymouth Albion (1 BP)

The Slade
Attendance: 674
Referee: Peter Caunt

27 November 2021
15:00

Birmingham Moseley	P – P	Rams

Billesley Common

27 November 2021
15:00

Blackheath	16 – 0	Bishop's Stortford

Well Hall
Attendance: 492
Referee: Matthew Sharpe

27 November 2021
15:00

(1 BP) Chinnor	22 – 5	Taunton Titans

Kingsey Road
Attendance: 403
Referee: Hamish Grant

27 November 2021
15:00

(1 BP) Cinderford	15 – 19	Sale FC

Dockham Road
Attendance: 692
Referee: Ben Rayner

Bye/s: Darlington Mowden Park

=== Round 13 ===
4 December 2021
12:30

Leeds Tykes	21 – 19	Tonbridge Juddians (1 BP)

The Sycamores
Attendance: 321
Referee: Owen Taylor

4 December 2021
14:30

Sale FC	24 – 0	Birmingham Moseley

Heywood Road
Attendance: N/A
Referee: Llyr ApGeraint-Roberts

4 December 2021
15:00

Bishop's Stortford	20 – 31	Caldy (1 BP)

Silver Leys
Attendance: 300
Referee: Adam Wookey

4 December 2021
15:00

(1 BP) Plymouth Albion	49 – 22	Darlington Mowden Park (1 BP)

Brickfields
Attendance: 737
Referee: Andrew Wigley

4 December 2021
15:00

(1 BP) Rams	13 – 17	Blackheath

Old Bath Road
Attendance: 613
Referee: Hamish Grant

4 December 2021
15:00

(1 BP) Rosslyn Park	28 – 27	Chinnor (2 BP)

The Rock
Attendance: 293
Referee: Jonathan Cook

4 December 2021
15:00

(1 BP) Taunton Titans	26 – 26	Cambridge (1 BP)

Towergate Stadium
Attendance: 324
Referee: Alan Chandrachud

Bye/s: Cinderford

=== Round 14 ===
11 December 2021
14:00

Caldy	20 – 3	Rams

Paton Field
Attendance: 278
Referee: Charles Gayther

11 December 2021
14:00

(1 BP) Cambridge	34 – 29	Rosslyn Park (2 BP)

Grantchester Road
Attendance: 489
Referee: Daniel Rowlands

11 December 2021
14:00

(1 BP) Tonbridge Juddians	21 – 24	Taunton Titans (1 BP)

The Slade
Attendance: 211
Referee: Alan Chandrachud

11 December 2021
15:00

(1 BP) Blackheath	28 – 34	Sale FC (1 BP)

Well Hall
Attendance: 303
Referee: Jonathan Cook

11 December 2021
15:00

(1 BP) Chinnor	19 – 23	Bishop's Stortford

Kingsey Road
Attendance: 422
Referee: Adam Wookey

11 December 2021
15:00

Darlington Mowden Park	26 – 7	Cinderford

Northern Echo Arena
Attendance: 502
Referee: Timothy Allatt

11 December 2021
15:00

Plymouth Albion	P – P	Leeds Tykes

Brickfields

Bye/s: Birmingham Moseley

=== Round 15 ===
17 December 2021
20:00

Rams	P – P	Chinnor

Old Bath Road

18 December 2021
14:30

Leeds Tykes	P – P	Darlington Mowden Park

The Sycamores

18 December 2021
14:30

(1 BP) Sale FC	21 – 26	Caldy (1 BP)

Heywood Road
Attendance: 416
Referee: James O'Brien

18 December 2021
15:00

(1 BP) Bishop's Stortford	19 – 24	Cambridge (1 BP)

Silver Leys
Attendance: 720
Referee: Calum Howard

18 December 2021
15:00

(1 BP) Cinderford	26 – 13	Birmingham Moseley

Dockham Road
Attendance: 495
Referee: Harry Walbaum

18 December 2021
15:00

Rosslyn Park	P – P	Tonbridge Juddians

The Rock

18 December 2021
15:00

(1 BP) Taunton Titans	35 – 25	Plymouth Albion

Towergate Stadium
Attendance: 1,200 (Ground record)
Referee: Charles Gayther

Bye/s: Blackheath

=== Round 16 ===
8 January 2022
14:00

(1 BP) Caldy	26 – 24	Cinderford (1 BP)

Paton Field
Attendance: 297
Referee: James O'Brien

8 January 2022
14:00

Cambridge	17 – 14	Sale FC (1 BP)

Grantchester Road
Attendance: 411
Referee: Andrew Jackson

8 January 2022
14:00

(1 BP) Plymouth Albion	31 – 17	Bishop's Stortford

Brickfields
Attendance: 540
Referee: Hamish Grant

8 January 2022
14:00

(1 BP) Tonbridge Juddians	19 – 22	Rams

The Slade
Attendance: 157
Referee: Johathan Cook

8 January 2022
14:30

(1 BP) Leeds Tykes	13 – 19	Rosslyn Park

Headingley Stadium
Attendance: 620
Referee: Ben Rayner

8 January 2022
15:00

(1 BP) Blackheath	17 – 22	Birmingham Moseley

Well Hall
Attendance: 320
Referee: Calum Howard

8 January 2022
15:00

Taunton Titans	24 – 14	Darlington Mowden Park

Towergate Stadium
Attendance: 392
Referee: Andrew Wigley

Bye/s: Chinnor

=== Round 17 ===
15 January 2022
14:30

(1 BP) Sale FC	66 – 10	Tonbridge Juddians

Heywood Road
Attendance: 520
Referee: Owen Taylor

15 January 2022
15:00

(1 BP) Birmingham Moseley	11 – 15	Caldy

Billesley Common
Attendance: 602
Referee: Hamish Grant

15 January 2022
15:00

Bishop's Stortford	12 – 7	Leeds Tykes (1 BP)

Silver Leys
Attendance: 592
Referee: Alan Chandrachud

15 January 2022
15:00

(1 BP) Cinderford	24 – 31	Chinnor (1 BP)

Dockham Road
Attendance: 515
Referee: Adam Wookey

15 January 2022
15:00

(1 BP) Rams	41 – 27	Plymouth Albion

Old Bath Road
Attendance: 713
Referee: Alexander Thomas

15 January 2022
15:00

(1 BP) Rosslyn Park	68 – 21	Taunton Titans

The Rock
Attendance: 601
Referee: Jonathan Cook

15 January 2022
15:30

Darlington Mowden Park	P – P	Blackheath

Northern Echo Arena

Bye/s: Cambridge

=== Round 18 ===
22 January 2022
14:00

Caldy	26 – 10	Blackheath

Paton Field
Attendance: 314
Referee: Adam Wookey

22 January 2022
14:00

(1 BP) Cambridge	27 – 21	Cinderford (1 BP)

Grantchester Road
Attendance: 415
Referee: Dr Jonathan Cook

22 January 2022
15:00

(2 BP) Chinnor	27 – 29	Birminghman Moseley (1 BP)

Kingsey Road
Attendance: 477
Referee: Andy Wigley

22 January 2022
15:00

(1 BP) Plymouth Albion	7 – 10	Sale FC

Brickfields
Attendance: 866
Referee: Alan Chandrachud

22 January 2022
15:00

(1 BP) Rosslyn Park	28 – 20	Darlington Mowden Park

The Rock
Attendance: 450
Referee: Hamish Grant

22 January 2022
15:00

(1 BP) Taunton Titans	29 – 29	Bishop's Stortford (1 BP)

Towergate Stadium
Attendance: 401
Referee: James William Milliner-Woodcock

22 January 2022
16:15

Leeds Tykes	25 – 22	Rams (2 BP)

The Sycamores
Attendance: 418
Referee: Hamish Smales

Bye/s: Tonbridge Juddians

=== Round 19 ===
29 January 2022
14:30

(1 BP) Leeds Tykes	13 – 17	Sale FC

The Sycamores
Attendance: 517
Referee: Daniel Rowlands

29 January 2022
15:00

Birmingham Moseley	10 – 21	Cambridge

Billesley Common
Attendance: 709
Referee: Tim Allatt

29 January 2022
15:00

(1 BP) Bishop's Stortford	36 – 24	Rosslyn Park (1 BP)

Silver Leys
Attendance: 503
Referee: Calum Howard

29 January 2022
15:00

Blackheath	25 – 15	Chinnor

Well Hall
Attendance: 450
Referee: Richard Gordon

29 January 2022
15:00

(1 BP) Cinderford	41 – 5	Tonbridge Juddians

Dockham Road
Attendance: 415
Referee: Andy Wigley

29 January 2022
15:00

Darlington Mowden Park	7 – 40	Caldy (1 BP)

Northern Echo Arena
Attendance: 712
Referee: George Selwood

29 January 2022
15:00

(1 BP) Rams	43 – 19	Taunton Titans

Old Bath Road
Attendance: 498
Referee: Jonathan Cook

Bye/s: Plymouth Albion

=== Rounds 12, 14, 15 & 17 (rescheduled matches) ===
4 February 2022
19:00

(1 BP) Rosslyn Park	57 – 5	Tonbridge Juddians

The Rock
Attendance: 600
Referee: Jonathan Cook

5 February 2022
15:00

Birmingham Moseley	5 – 26	Rams (1 BP)

Billesley Common
Attendance: 401
Referee: Dan Thomas

5 February 2022
15:00

(1 BP) Plymouth Albion	29 – 18	Leeds Tykes

Brickfields
Attendance: 804
Referee: Calum Howard

5 February 2022
18:15

Darlington Mowden Park	19 – 14	Blackheath

Northern Echo Arena
Attendance: 671
Referee: Tim Allett

=== Round 20 ===
12 February 2022
14:00

(1 BP) Cambridge	34 – 7	Blackheath

Grantchester Road
Attendance: 493
Referee: Alan Chandrachud

12 February 2022
14:00

Tonbridge Juddians	16 – 39	Birmingham Moseley (1 BP)

The Slade
Attendance: 190
Referee: Richard Gordon

12 February 2022
15:00

(1 BP) Bishop's Stortford	36 – 26	Darlington Mowden Park

Silver Leys
Attendance: 573
Referee: Daniel Rowlands

12 February 2022
15:00

Chinnor	12 – 23	Caldy

Kingsey Road
Attendance: 419
Referee: Adam Wookey

12 February 2022
15:00

(1 BP) Plymouth Albion	13 – 20	Cinderford

Brickfields
Attendance: 813
Referee: Iain Kly

12 February 2022
15:00

(1 BP) Rosslyn Park	13 – 17	Rams

The Rock
Attendance: 427
Referee: Hamish Grant

12 February 2022
15:00

(1 BP) Taunton Titans	40 – 50	Sale FC (1 BP)

Towergate Stadium
Attendance: 420
Referee: Jonathan Cook

Bye/s: Leeds Tykes

=== Round 21 ===
19 February 2022
14:00

Caldy	9 – 0	Cambridge

Paton Field
Attendance: 621
Referee: Timothy Allett

19 February 2022
14:30

Leeds Tykes	P – P	Cinderford

The Sycamores

19 February 2022
14:30

Sale FC	21 – 17	Rosslyn Park (1 BP)

Heywood Road
Attendance: 666
Referee: Adam Wookey

19 February 2022
15:00

Birmingham Moseley	P – P	Plymouth Albion

Billesely Common

19 February 2022
15:00

(1 BP) Blackheath	12 – 16	Tonbridge Juddians

Well Hall
Attendance: 650
Referee: Callum Howard

19 February 2022
15:00

(1 BP) Darlington Mowden Park	42 – 17	Chinnor

Northern Echo Arena
Attendance: 711
Referee: Hamish Grant

19 February 2022
15:00

Rams	17 – 5	Bishop's Stortford

Old Bath Road
Attendance: 582
Referee: Richard Gordon

Bye/s: Taunton Titans

=== Round 22 ===
26 February 2022
14:00

(1 BP) Cambridge	41 – 3	Chinnor

Grantchester Road
Attendance: 301
Referee: Tim Allatt

26 February 2022
14:00

Plymouth Albion	24 – 22	Blackheath (1 BP)

Brickfields
Attendance: 897
Referee: James Milliner-Woodcock

26 February 2022
14:00

Tonbridge Juddians	21 – 40	Caldy (1 BP)

The Slade
Attendance: 620
Referee: Matthew Sharpe

26 February 2022
14:30

(2 BP) Leeds Tykes	27 – 30	Moseley

The Sycamores
Attendance: 411
Referee: Nikki O'Donnell

26 February 2022
15:00

(2 BP) Bishop's Stortford	33 – 35	Sale FC (1 BP)

Silver Leys
Attendance: 483
Referee: Hamish Grant

26 February 2022
15:00

(2 BP) Rams	36 – 32	Darlington Mowden Park (1 BP)

Old Bath Road
Attendance: 320
Referee: Adam Wookey

26 February 2022
15:00

Taunton Titans	19 – 30	Cinderford (1 BP)

Towergate Stadium
Attendance: 620
Referee: Matthew Sharpe

Bye/s: Birmingham Moseley

=== Round 23 ===
5 March 2022
14:30

Sale FC	22 – 21	Rams (1 BP)

Heywood Road
Attendance: 666
Referee: Andrew Wigley

5 March 2022
15:00

(1 BP) Birmingham Moseley	22 – 20	Taunton (1 BP)

Billesley Common
Attendance: 634
Referee: Iain Kly

5 March 2022
15:00

(1 BP) Blackheath	21 – 22	Leeds Tykes

Well Hall
Attendance: 350
Referee: Hamish Grant

5 March 2022
15:00

(1 BP) Caldy	47 – 28	Plymouth Albion (1 BP)

Paton Field
Attendance: 478
Referee: Ben Rayner

5 March 2022
15:00

(1 BP) Chinnor	36 – 10	Tonbridge Juddians

Kingsey Road
Attendance: 426
Referee: Calum Howard

5 March 2022
15:00

(1 BP) Cinderford	10 – 13	Rosslyn Park

Dockham Road
Attendance: 470
Referee: Nicholas Wood

5 March 2022
15:00

(1 BP) Darlington Mowden Park	20 – 22	Cambridge (1 BP)

Northern Echo Arena
Attendance: 781
Referee: Llyr ApGeraint Roberts

Bye/s: Bishop's Stortford

=== Round 24 ===
12 March 2022
14:00

(1 BP) Rosslyn Park	47 – 14	Birmingham Moseley

The Rock
Attendance: 358
Referee: Jonathan Cook

12 March 2022
14:30

(1 BP) Sale FC	46 – 14	Darlington Mowden Park

Heywood Road
Attendance: 322
Referee: Ben Rayner

12 March 2022
14:30

Tonbridge Juddians	10 – 59	Cambridge (1 BP)

The Slade
Attendance: 158
Referee: Iain Kiy

12 March 2022
15:00

(1 BP) Bishop's Stortford	15 – 20	Cinderford

Silver Leys
Attendance: 398
Referee: Hamish Grant

12 March 2022
15:00

Leeds Tykes	13 – 28	Caldy (1 BP)

The Sycamores
Attendance: 581
Referee: Llyr Apgeraint-Roberts

12 March 2022
15:00

(1 BP) Plymouth Albion	12 – 19	Chinnor

Brickfields
Attendance: 942
Referee: Adam Wookey

12 March 2022
15:00

(1 BP) Taunton Titans	43 – 28	Blackheath (1 BP)

Towergate Stadium
Attendance: 518
Referee: Alan Chandrachud

Bye/s: Rams

=== Round 15 & 21 (rescheduled matches) ===
18 March 2022
20:00

(1 BP) Rams	36 – 22	Chinnor

Old Bath Road
Attendance: 1,021

19 March 2022
15:00

(2 BP) Leeds Tykes	22 – 23	Darlington Mowden Park

The Sycamores
Attendance: 480

19 March 2022
15:00

(1 BP) Birmingham Moseley	45 – 28	Plymouth Albion (1 BP)

Billesley Common
Attendance: 345

=== Round 25 ===
26 March 2022
14:30

Darlington Mowden Park	22 – 20	Tonbridge Juddians (1 BP)

Northern Echo Arena
Attendance: 727
Referee: Owen Taylor

26 March 2022
15:00

Birmingham Moseley	17 – 29	Bishop's Stortford (1 BP)

Billesley Common
Attendance: 682
Referee: Dan Rowlands

26 March 2022
15:00

(1 BP) Blackheath	31 – 24	Rosslyn Park (2 BP)

Well Hall
Attendance: 600
Referee: Calum Howard

26 March 2022
15:00

(1 BP) Caldy	52 – 31	Taunton Titans (1 BP)

Paton Field
Attendance: 691
Referee: James O'Brien

26 March 2022
15:00

(1 BP) Cambridge	48 – 24	Plymouth Albion (1 BP)

Grantchester Road
Attendance: 421
Referee: Peter Caunt

26 March 2022
15:00

(1 BP) Chinnor	36 – 27	Leeds Tykes

Kingsey Road
Attendance: 387
Referee: Richard Gordon

26 March 2022
15:00

(1 BP) Cinderford	38 – 17	Rams

Dockham Road
Attendance: 435
Referee: Andrew Wigley

Bye/s: Sale FC

=== Round 26 ===
2 April 2022
14:30

(1 BP) Sale FC	32 – 17	Cinderford

Heywood Road
Attendance: 577
Referee: Hamish Grant

2 April 2022
15:00

(1 BP) Bishop's Stortford	24 – 19	Blackheath

Silver Leys
Attendance: 501
Referee: Andrew Wigley

2 April 2022
15:00

(1 BP) Leeds Tykes	27 – 38	Cambridge (1 BP)

The Sycamores
Attendance: 442
Referee: Jonathan Cook

2 April 2022
15:00

(1 BP) Plymouth Albion	34 – 21	Tonbridge Juddians

Brickfields
Attendance: 882
Referee: Calum Howard

2 April 2022
15:00

(1 BP) Rams	26 – 27	Birmingham Moseley

Old Bath Road
Attendance: 629
Referee: Alan Chandrachud

2 April 2022
15:00

(1 BP) Rosslyn Park	17 – 18	Caldy

The Rock
Attendance: 1,185
Referee: Adam Wookey

2 April 2022
15:00

(1 BP) Taunton Titans	43 – 29	Chinnor (1 BP)

Towergate Stadium
Attendance: 536
Referee: Dan Parrott

Bye/s: Darlington Mowden Park

=== Round 27 ===
9 April 2022
15:00

(1 BP) Birmingham Moseley	24 – 43	Sale FC (1 BP)

Billesley Common
Attendance: 954
Referee: Tim Allatt

9 April 2022
15:00

Blackheath	17 – 29	Rams (1 BP)

Well Hall
Attendance: 650
Referee: Ben Rayner

9 April 2022
15:00

(1 BP) Caldy	31 – 18	Bishop's Stortford

Paton Field
Attendance: 781
Referee: Hamish Grant

9 April 2022
15:00

(1 BP) Cambridge	38 – 24	Taunton Titans (1 BP)

Grantchester Road
Attendance: 489
Referee: Richard Gordon

9 April 2022
15:00

(1 BP) Chinnor	55 – 17	Rosslyn Park

Kingsey Road
Attendance: 453
Referee: Andy Wigley

9 April 2022
15:00

Darlington Mowden Park	25 – 22	Plymouth Albion (2 BP)

Northern Echo Arena
Attendance: 688
Referee: Dr Jonathan Cook

9 April 2022
15:00

(1 BP) Tonbridge Juddians	29 – 27	Leeds Tykes (2 BP)

The Slade
Attendance: 198
Referee: Adam Wookey

Bye/s: Birmingham Moseley

=== Round 28 ===
15 April 2022
15:00

(1 BP) Sale FC	29 – 23	Blackheath (1 BP)

Heywood Road
Attendance: 645
Referee: Andrew Wigley

16 April 2022
15:00

(1 BP) Bishop's Stortford	39 – 26	Chinnor (1 BP)

Silver Leys
Attendance: 301
Referee: Matthew Sharpe

16 April 2022
15:00

(1 BP) Cinderford	50 – 14	Darlington Mowden Park

Dockham Road
Attendance: 320
Referee: Daniel Rowlands

16 April 2022
15:00

(1 BP) Leeds Tykes	42 – 35	Plymouth Albion (2 BP)

The Sycamores
Attendance: 274
Referee: Hamish Grant

16 April 2022
15:00

Rams	21 – 32	Caldy (1 BP)

Old Bath Road
Attendance: 443
Referee: Jonathan Cook

16 April 2022
15:00

(1 BP) Rosslyn Park	26 – 20	Cambridge (1 BP)

The Rock
Attendance: 470
Referee: Richard Gordon

16 April 2022
15:00

(1 BP) Taunton Titans	43 – 40	Tonbridge Juddians (2 BP)

Towergate Stadium
Attendance: 582
Referee: Iain Kly

Bye/s: Birmingham Moseley

=== Round 29 ===
22 April 2022
19:30

Darlington Mowden Park	15 – 30	Leeds Tykes (1 BP)

Northern Echo Arena
Attendance: 1,249
Referee: Adam Wookey

22 April 2022
19:45

(1 BP) Chinnor	43 – 40	Rams (2 BP)

Kingsey Road
Attendance: 877
Referee: Richard Gordon

23 April 2022
15:00

Caldy	13 – 9	Sale FC (1 BP)

Paton Field
Attendance: 3,023
Referee: Hamish Grant

23 April 2022
15:00

(1 BP) Cambridge	41 – 19	Bishop's Stortford

Grantchester Road
Attendance: 521
Referee: Nikki O'Donnell

23 April 2022
15:00

(1 BP) Birmingham Moseley	10 – 14	Cinderford

Billesley Common
Attendance: 1,010
Referee: Iain Kly

23 April 2022
15:00

(1 BP) Plymouth Albion	54 – 17	Taunton Titans

Brickfields
Attendance: 1,486
Referee: Alan Chandrachud

23 April 2022
15:00

Tonbridge Juddians	12 – 46	Rosslyn Park (1 BP)

The Slade
Attendance: 418
Referee: Peter Caunt

Bye/s: Blackheath

=== Round 30 ===
30 April 2022
15:00

(1 BP) Bishop's Stortford	20 – 23	Tonbridge Juddians

Silver Leys
Attendance: 610
Referee: Neil Sweeney

30 April 2022
15:00

(1 BP) Cinderford	53 – 28	Blackheath (1 BP)

Dockham Road
Attendance: 595
Referee: Jonathan Cook

30 April 2022
15:00

(1 BP) Darlington Mowden Park	52 – 24	Birmingham Moseley (1 BP)

Northern Echo Arena
Attendance: 707
Referee: Owen Taylor

30 April 2022
15:00

(1 BP) Rams	45 – 7	Cambridge

Old Bath Road
Attendance: 612
Referee: Alan Chandrachud

30 April 2022
15:00

(1 BP) Rosslyn Park	28 – 28	Plymouth Albion (1 BP)

Priory Lane
Attendance: N/A
Referee: Iain Kly

30 April 2022
15:00

(1 BP) Sale FC	50 – 17	Chinnor

Heywood Road
Attendance: N/A
Referee: Ben Rayner

30 April 2022
15:00

(1 BP) Taunton Titans	24 – 41	Leeds Tykes (1 BP)

Towergate Stadium
Attendance: 640
Referee: Andrew Wigley

Bye/s: Caldy

=== Rescheduled match ===
7 May 2022
15:00

(1 BP) Leeds Tykes	32 – 32	Cinderford (1 BP)

The Sycamores
Attendance: 470
Referee: Andrew Wigley

== Attendances ==
Club	Home games	Total	Average	Highest	Lowest	% Capacity
Birmingham Moseley	14	9,699	693	1,010	345	14%
Bishop's Stortford	14	6,707	479	720	300	30%
Blackheath	14	7,183	513	720	303	31%
Caldy	14	8,938	638	3,023	278	16%
Cambridge	14	6,315	451	807	301	21%
Chinnor	14	6,436	460	877	340	23%
Cinderford	14	6,506	465	692	320	19%
Darlington Mowden Park	14	10,931	781	1,249	502	3%
Leeds Tykes	14	5,954	425	620	274	26%
Plymouth Albion	14	14,536	1,038	2,088	540	12%
Rams	14	8,857	633	1,021	320	32%
Rosslyn Park	13 (Note: Rosslyn Park missing home attendance figure against Plymouth Albion on 30 April 2022.)	7,437	572	1,185	293	29%
Sale FC	12 (Note: Sale FC missing home attendance figures against Birmingham Moseley on 4 December 2021 & Chinnor on 30 April 2022.)	6,871	573	827	322	17%
Taunton Titans	14	8,121	580	1,200	324	29%
Tonbridge Juddians	14	4,272	305	674	87	20%

== Individual statistics ==
=== Top points scorers ===
Rank	Player	Team	Points
1	Benjamin Jones	Caldy	248
2	James Bourton	Chinnor	195
3	Reece Boughton	Cinderford	193
4	Charlie Venables	Leeds Tykes	168
5	Thomas Putt	Plymouth Albion	161
6	James Robins	Sale FC	154
7	James White	Tonbridge Juddians	153
8	Warren Seals	Darlington Mowden Park	152
9	Craig Holland	Rosslyn Park	149
9	Jack Walsh	Taunton Titans	149

=== Top try scorers ===
Rank	Player	Team	Tries
1	Nathan Taylor	Cinderford	28
2	Benjamin Brownlie	Cambridge	27
3	Alex Ducker	Plymouth Albion	18
4	Charlie Wright	Taunton Titans	17
5	Hugo Ellis	Rosslyn Park	16
6	Joshua Stannard	Bishop's Stortford	15
7	Nana Asiedu	Cambridge	14
7	Henry Bird	Rams	14
7	Harry Jukes	Leeds Tykes	14
7	Tom Vooght	Rams	14

== See also ==
- 2021–22 National League 2 North
- 2021–22 National League 2 South
