= 2021–22 National League 2 South =

Rugby union competition in England

- Countries: England; Guernsey
- Date: 4 September 2021 – 7 May 2022
- Champions: Esher (2nd title)
- Runners-up: Redruth
- Relegated: No relegation
- Matches played: 238
- Attendance: 87,125 (average 366 per match)
- Highest attendance: 1,350 – Esher v Worthing Raiders, 23 April 2022
- Lowest attendance: 107 – Westcliff v Esher, 13 November 2021; Westcliff v Barnstaple, 5 February 2022
- Tries scored: 1797 (average 7.6 per match)
- Top point scorer: 310 – Sam Morley (Esher)
- Top try scorer: 22 – Finlay Sharp (Clifton)

The 2021–22 National League 2 South was the twelfth and final season (34th overall) of the fourth tier (south) of the English domestic rugby union competitions since the professionalised format of the second division was introduced.

== Structure ==
The league consisted of sixteen teams with all the teams playing each other on a home and away basis to make a total of thirty matches each. As originally planned there was one promotion place and one relegation place. The champions would be promoted to the 2022–23 National League 1 and the last team relegated to the most appropriate tier five league depending on the geographical location of the team.

The results of the matches contribute points to the league as follows:

- 4 points are awarded for a win
- 2 points are awarded for a draw
- 0 points are awarded for a loss, however
- 1 losing (bonus) point is awarded to a team that loses a match by 7 points or fewer
- 1 additional (bonus) point is awarded to a team scoring 4 tries or more in a match.

=== Participating teams and locations ===
Locations of the 2021–22 National League 2 South teams

Eleven of the teams listed below participated in the 2019–20 National League 2 North season. The 2019–20 champions, Taunton Titans, and runner-up, Tonbridge Juddians (Note: Due to the COVID-19 pandemic in the United Kingdom the promotion play-off game between the runners-up of National League 2 South and the 2019–20 National League 2 North was cancelled and the winner was determined on final points tally. Tonbridge Juddians with 117.02 points were promoted ahead of Fylde with 107.88.) were promoted to the 2021–22 National League 1, replacing Canterbury who were relegated from the 2019–20 National League 1. The three teams relegated from National League 2 South the previous season were Sutton & Epsom (London & South East Premier), and Bournemouth and Old Redcliffians (both South-West Premier). The promoted teams were Barnstaple (champions of South West Premier), while Rochford Hundred and Guernsey Raiders come up as champions and runner-up of London & South East Premier. In order to address an imbalance of teams, Hinckley were level transferred to the 2021–22 National League 2 South as the most appropriate located team in terms of access to the southern sides.

The Rugby Football Union restructured the leagues after the 2021–22 season and National 2 South was discontinued. Fifteen of the sixteen teams were placed into one of the other level four leagues for 2022–23. Barnes, Bury St. Edmunds, Canterbury, Guernsey Raiders, Henley Hawks, Old Albanian, Rochford Hundred, Westcliff and Worthing Raiders were transferred to the newly created National League 2 East while Barnstaple, Clifton, Dings Crusaders, Hinckley, Leicester Lions and Redruth were transferred to another new level four league, National League 2 West. The champions Esher were promoted to National League 1. No teams were relegated to level five.

Team	Ground	Capacity	City/Area	Previous season
Barnes	Barn Elms	1,000	Barnes, London	12th
Barnstaple	Pottingham Road	2,000 (575 seats)	Barnstaple, Devon	Promoted from South West Premier (champions)
Bury St Edmunds	The Haberden	3,000 (135 seats)	Bury St Edmunds, Suffolk	6th
Canterbury	Marine Travel Ground	1,500 (75 seats)	Canterbury, Kent	Relegated from National 1 (15th)
Clifton	Station Road	2,200 (200 seats)	Cribbs Causeway, Patchway, Bristol	5th
Dings Crusaders	Shaftesbury Park	2,250 (250 seats)	Frenchay, Bristol	11th
Esher	Molesey Road	3,500	Hersham, Surrey	8th
Guernsey Raiders	Footes Lane	5,000 (720 seats)	Saint Peter Port, Guernsey	Promoted from London & South East Premier (runners-up)
Henley Hawks	Dry Leas	4,000	Henley-on-Thames, Oxfordshire	4th
Hinckley	De Montfort Park	2,000	Hinckley, Leicestershire	Transferred from National 2 North (3rd)
Leicester Lions	Westleigh Park	2,000	Blaby, Leicestershire	7th
Old Albanian	Woollam's Playing Fields	1,000	St Albans, Hertfordshire	10th
Redruth	Recreation Ground	3,500 (580 seats)	Redruth, Cornwall	3rd
Rochford Hundred	The Rugby Park	1,000	Hawkwell, Rochford, Essex	Promoted from London & South East Premier (champions)
Westcliff	The Gables	1,000	Eastwood, Essex	13th
Worthing Raiders	Roundstone Lane	1,500 (100 seats)	Angmering, West Sussex	9th

== League table ==
2021–22 National League 2 South table
Pos	Team	Pld	W	D	L	PF	PA	PD	TB	LB	Pts	Qualification
1	Esher	30	25	1	4	1115	617	+498	23	2	132	Promotion place
2	Redruth	30	24	1	5	973	489	+484	19	2	119	
3	Clifton	30	22	1	7	1181	677	+504	22	4	116	
4	Worthing Raiders	30	20	1	9	886	648	+238	21	6	109	
5	Leicester Lions	30	21	0	9	872	583	+289	18	5	107	
6	Bury St Edmunds	30	16	2	12	897	744	+153	14	6	88	
7	Dings Crusaders	30	15	1	14	847	812	+35	19	6	87	
8	Henley Hawks	30	15	3	12	765	729	+36	14	4	84	
9	Old Albanian	30	14	0	16	876	791	+85	17	9	77 (Note: 5 points deducted)	
10	Guernsey Raiders	29	13	1	15	731	851	−120	14	4	72	
11	Barnes	30	11	5	14	740	724	+16	12	5	71	
12	Canterbury	29	10	2	17	628	707	−79	11	5	60	
13	Hinckley	29	9	0	20	700	849	−149	12	9	57	
14	Rochford Hundred	29	7	0	22	530	948	−418	8	7	43	
15	Westcliff	30	3	0	27	401	1365	−964	5	2	19	
16	Barnstaple	30	4	0	26	427	1035	−608	0	2	18	

Updated to match(es) played on 1 June 2022. Source: National League 2 South RFU
Rules for classification: If teams are level at any stage, tiebreakers are applied in the following order:
1. Number of matches won
2. Difference between points for and against
3. Total number of points for
4. Aggregate number of points scored in matches between tied teams
5. Number of matches won excluding the first match, then the second and so on until the tie is settled
  Notes:

== Fixtures & results ==
Fixtures for the season were announced by the RFU on 4 May 2021.

=== Round 1 ===
4 September 2021
15:00

(1 BP) Bury St Edmunds	30 – 22	Canterbury

The Haberden
Attendance: 382
Referee: Richard Gordon

4 September 2021
15:00

(1 BP) Clifton	71 – 0	Barnstaple

Station Road
Attendance: 289
Referee: Lloyd Davies

4 September 2021
15:00

(1 BP) Esher	38 – 14	Rochford Hundred

Molesey Road
Attendance: 383
Referee: Andrew MacMeaney

4 September 2021
15:00

(1 BP) Worthing Raiders	33 – 22	Guernsey Raiders

Roundstone Lane
Attendance: 300
Referee: Neil Sweeney

4 September 2021
15:00

(1 BP) Henley Hawks	19 – 25	Old Albanians

Dry Leas
Attendance: 300
Referee: Veryan Boscawen

4 September 2021
15:00

Hinckley	24 – 43	Barnes (1 BP)

De Montfort Park
Attendance: 500
Referee: Benjamin Woods

4 September 2021
15:00

(1 BP) Redruth	27 – 5	Leicester Lions

Recreation Ground
Attendance: 615
Referee: James Milliner

4 September 2021
15:00

Westcliff	25 – 29	Dings Crusaders (1 BP)

The Gables
Attendance: 274
Referee: Peter Caunt

=== Round 2 ===
11 September 2021
14:00

(1 BP) Leicester Lions	24 – 31	Clifton (1 BP)

Westleigh Park
Attendance: 238
Referee: Carl Adams

11 September 2021
14:30

(1 BP) Barnstaple	35 – 17	Westcliff

Pottingham Road
Attendance: 535
Referee: Iain Kly

11 September 2021
15:00

Barnes	10 – 24	Redruth

Barn Elms
Attendance: 224
Referee: Richard Gordon

11 September 2021
15:00

Dings Crusaders	19 – 45	Esher (1 BP)

Shaftesbury Park
Attendance: 250
Referee: Lloyd Davies

11 September 2021
15:00

(1 BP) Old Albanian	29 – 21	Canterbury

Woollam's Playing Fields
Attendance: 457
Referee: Andrew Macneaney

11 September 2021
15:00

(1 BP) Rochford Hundred	24 – 42	Guernsey Raiders (1 BP)

The Rugby Park
Attendance: 300
Referee: Matthew Sharpe

11 September 2021
15:00

(1 BP) Worthing Raiders	29 – 21	Bury St Edmunds

Roundstone Lane
Attendance: 950
Referee: Jack Sutton

11 September 2021

Henley Hawks	P – P	Hinckley

Dry Leas

=== Round 3 ===
18 September 2021
14:30

(1 BP) Clifton	57 – 10	Barnes

Station Road
Attendance: 245
Referee: Chris Wood

18 September 2021
15:00

(1 BP) Bury St Edmunds	29 – 3	Rochford Hundred

The Haberden
Attendance: 350
Referee: Mike Lamb

18 September 2021
15:00

(1 BP) Canterbury	29 – 24	Worthing Raiders (2 BP)

Marine Travel Ground
Attendance: 450
Referee: Richard Gordon

18 September 2021
15:00

(1 BP) Esher	64 – 22	Barnstaple

Molesey Road
Attendance: 413
Referee: Jack Sutton

18 September 2021
15:00

(2 BP) Dings Crusaders	31 – 34	Guernsey Raiders (1 BP)

Shaftesbury Park
Attendance: 389
Referee: Callum Watson

18 September 2021
15:00

(2 BP) Hinckley	26 – 32	Old Albanian (1 BP)

De Montfort Park
Attendance: 400
Referee: Lloyd Davies

18 September 2021
15:00

Westcliff	17 – 50	Leicester Lions (1 BP)

The Gables
Attendance: 216
Referee: Neil Sweeney

18 September 2021

Redruth	P – P	Henley Hawks

Dry Leas

=== Round 4 ===
25 September 2021
14:00

(1 BP) Leicester Lions	27 – 21	Esher (1 BP)

Westleigh Park
Attendance: 300
Referee: Owen Taylor

25 September 2021
14:30

Barnstaple	17 – 27	Guernsey Raiders

Pottingham Road
Attendance: 587
Referee: Lloyd Davies

25 September 2021
15:00

(1 BP) Barnes	46 – 12	Westcliff

Barn Elms
Attendance: 160
Referee: Lloyd Davies

25 September 2021
15:00

(1 BP) Dings Crusaders	33 – 27	Bury St Edmunds (1 BP)

Shaftesbury Park
Attendance: 421

25 September 2021
15:00

Henley Hawks	28 – 27	Clifton (1 BP)

Dry Leas
Attendance: 443
Referee: Richard Gordon

25 September 2021
15:00

Hinckley	7 – 41	Redruth (1 BP)

De Montfort Park
Attendance: 350
Referee: Matt Sharpe

25 September 2021
15:00

Old Albanian	13 – 22	Worthing Raiders (1 BP)

Woollam's Playing Fields
Attendance: 150
Referee: Michael Lamb

25 September 2021
15:00

Rochford Hundred	20 – 19	Canterbury (1 BP)

The Rugby Park
Attendance: 200
Referee: Calum Howard

=== Round 5 ===
2 October 2021
14:30

Clifton	20 – 13	Hinckley (1 BP)

Station Road
Attendance: 118
Referee: Lloyd Davies

2 October 2021
14:30

Redruth	22 – 21	Old Albanian (1 BP)

Recreation Ground
Attendance: 525
Referee: Alan Chandrachud

2 October 2021
15:00

Bury St Edmunds	16 – 9	Barnstaple (1 BP)

The Haberden
Attendance: 375
Referee: Jack Sutton

2 October 2021
15:00

Canterbury	0 – 17	Dings Crusaders

Marine Travel Ground
Attendance: 263
Referee: Michael Lamb

2 October 2021
15:00

Esher	17 – 17	Barnes

Molesey Road
Attendance: 416
Referee: Richard Gordon

2 October 2021
15:00

Guernsey Raiders	17 – 5	Leicester Lions

Footes Lane
Attendance: 600
Referee: Neil Sweeney

2 October 2021
15:00

Westcliff	7 – 36	Henley Hawks (1 BP)

The Gables
Attendance: 179
Referee: Peter Caunt

2 October 2021
15:00

Worthing Raiders	17 – 0	Rochford Hundred

Roundstone Lane
Attendance: 249
Referee: Matt Sharpe

=== Round 6 ===
9 October 2021
14:00

(1 BP) Leicester Lions	49 – 26	Bury St Edmunds (1 BP)

Westleigh Park
Attendance: 200
Referee: Callum Watson

9 October 2021
15:00

(1 BP) Barnes	19 – 26	Guernsey Raiders (1 BP)

Barn Elms
Attendance: 212
Referee: Neil Sweeney

9 October 2021
15:00

Barnstaple	10 – 22	Canterbury

Pottingham Road
Attendance: 568
Referee: Jamess Milliner-Woodcock

9 October 2021
15:00

(2 BP) Dings Crusaders	33 – 35	Worthing Raiders (1 BP)

Shaftesbury Park
Attendance: 350
Referee: Dan Parrott

9 October 2021
15:00

(1 BP) Henley Hawks	31 – 21	Esher

Dry Leas
Attendance: 395
Referee: Matthew Sharpe

9 October 2021
15:00

(1 BP) Hinckley	68 – 5	Westcliff

De Montfort Park
Attendance: 400
Referee: Iain Kly

9 October 2021
15:00

(1 BP) Old Albanian	21 – 22	Rochford Hundred

Woollam's Playing Fields
Attendance: 300
Referee: Michael Lamb

9 October 2021
15:00

(1 BP) Redruth	49 – 12	Clifton

Recreation Ground
Attendance: 825
Referee: Ben Wood

=== Round 7 ===
16 October 2021
14:00

Westcliff	7 – 57	Redruth (1 BP)

The Gables
Attendance: 216
Referee: Richard Gordon

16 October 2021
14:30

(2 BP) Clifton	32 – 33	Old Albanian (1 BP)

Station Road
Attendance: 187
Referee: Iain Kly

16 October 2021
15:00

(1 BP) Bury St Edmunds	63 – 25	Barnes

The Haberden
Attendance: 513
Referee: Matt Sharpe

16 October 2021
15:00

(1 BP) Canterbury	30 – 27	Leicester Lions (2 BP)

Marine Travel Ground
Attendance: 300

16 October 2021
15:00

(1 BP) Esher	34 – 33	Hinckley (2 BP)

Molesey Road
Attendance: 362
Referee: Lloyd Davies

16 October 2021
15:00

Rochford Hundred	22 – 17	Dings Crusaders (1 BP)

The Rugby Park
Attendance: 350
Referee: Peter Caunt

16 October 2021
15:00

(1 BP) Worthing Raiders	53 – 21	Barnstaple

Roundstone Lane
Attendance: 478
Referee: Alan Chandrachud

16 October 2021
15:45

Guernsey Raiders	17 – 16	Henley Hawks (1 BP)

Footes Lane
Attendance: 900
Referee: Jack Sutton

=== Round 8 ===
23 October 2021
14:00

Leicester Lions	17 – 7	Worthing Raiders

Westleigh Park
Attendance: 136
Referee: Peter Connor

23 October 2021
15:00

Barnes	20 – 20	Canterbury

Barn Elms
Attendance: 157
Referee: Jack Sutton

23 October 2021
15:00

Barnstaple	15 – 13	Rochford Hundred (1 BP)

Pottingham Road
Attendance: 547
Referee: Adam Wookey

23 October 2021
15:00

(1 BP) Clifton	106 – 17	Westcliff

Station Road
Attendance: 125
Referee: Iain Kly

23 October 2021
15:00

Henley Hawks	25 – 24	Bury St Edmunds (1 BP)

Dry Leas
Attendance: 377
Referee: Neil Sweeney

23 October 2021
15:00

(1 BP) Hinckley	16 – 19	Guernsey Raiders

De Montfort Park
Attendance: 350
Referee: Dan Rowlands

23 October 2021
15:00

(1 BP) Old Albanian	50 – 27	Dings Crusaders (1 BP)

Woollam's Playing Fields
Attendance: 300
Referee: Philip Russell

23 October 2021
15:00

(1 BP) Redruth	26 – 34	Esher (1 BP)

Recreation Ground
Attendance: 907
Referee: James Milner-Woodcock

=== Round 9 ===
30 October 2021
14:00

Guernsey Raiders	21 – 27	Redruth (1 BP)

Footes Lane
Attendance: 900
Referee: Alan Chandachud

30 October 2021
15:00

(1 BP) Bury St Edmunds	40 – 25	Hinckley

The Haberden
Attendance: 563
Referee: Peter Caunt

30 October 2021
15:00

Canterbury	10 – 19	Henley Hawks

Marine Travel Ground
Attendance: 400
Referee: Iain Kly

30 October 2021
15:00

(1 BP) Dings Crusaders	48 – 24	Barnstaple

Shaftesbury Park
Attendance: 416
Referee: Andrew Wigley

30 October 2021
15:00

(1 BP) Esher	32 – 12	Clifton

Molesey Road
Attendance: 487
Referee: Andrew MacNeaney

30 October 2021
15:00

(1 BP) Rochford Hundred	19 – 20	Leicester Lions

The Rugby Park
Attendance: 200
Referee: Neil Sweeney

30 October 2021
15:00

Westcliff	0 – 89	Old Albanians (1 BP)

The Gables
Attendance: 287
Referee: Katherine Richie

30 October 2021
15:00

(1 BP) Worthing	34 – 32	Barnes (2 BP)

Roundstone Lane
Attendance: 461
Referee: Matt Shape

=== Round 2 (rescheduled match) ===
6 November 2021
15:00

Henley Hawks	21 – 38	Hinckley (1 BP)

Dry Leas
Attendance: 243
Referee: Alan Chandrachud

=== Round 10 ===
13 November 2021
14:00

(1 BP) Clifton	40 – 17	Guernsey Raiders

Station Road
Attendance: 182
Referee: Lloyd Davies

13 November 2021
14:00

(1 BP) Leicester Lions	32 – 15	Dings Crusaders

Westleigh Park
Attendance: 195
Referee: Callum Watson

13 November 2021
14:00

(1 BP) Redruth	31 – 18	Bury St Edmunds

Recreation Ground
Attendance: 742
Referee: Ben Rayner

13 November 2021
14:15

Westcliff	7 – 80	Esher (1 BP)

The Gables
Attendance: 107
Referee: Simon Waite

13 November 2021
14:30

Barnes	23 – 15	Rochford Hundred

Barn Elms
Attendance: 154
Referee: Matt Sharpe

13 November 2021
15:00

(1 BP) Henley Hawks	43 – 26	Worthing (1 BP)

Dry Leas
Attendance: 310
Referee: Ben Wood

13 November 2021
15:00

Hinckley	P – P	Canterbury

De Montfort Park

13 November 2021
15:00

(1 BP) Old Albanian	45 – 21	Barnstaple

Woollam's Playing Fields
Attendance: 200
Referee: Richard Gordon

=== Round 11 ===
20 November 2021
14:00

(1 BP) Barnstaple	14 – 17	Leicester Lions

Pottingham Road
Attendance: 463
Referee: James Milliner-Wood

20 November 2021
14:00

(1 BP) Guernsey Raiders	60 – 5	Westcliff

Footes Lane
Attendance: 495
Referee: Michael Lamb

20 November 2021
14:00

(2 BP) Worthing	26 – 28	Hinckley

Roundstone Lane
Attendance: 305
Referee: Alan Chandrachud

20 November 2021
15:00

Bury St Edmunds	25 – 33	Clifton

The Haberden
Attendance: 472
Referee: Carl Adams

20 November 2021
15:00

(1 BP) Canterbury	22 – 26	Redruth (1 BP)

Marine Travel Ground
Attendance: 410
Referee: Simon Waite

20 November 2021
15:00

Dings Crusaders	21 – 21	Barnes

Shaftesbury Park
Attendance: 387
Referee: Dan Parrott

20 November 2021
15:00

(1 BP) Esher	41 – 21	Old Albanian

Molesey Road
Attendance: 403
Referee: Peter Caunt

20 November 2021
15:00

Rochford Hundred	15 – 37	Henley Hawks (1 BP)

The Rugby Park
Attendance: 303
Referee: Philip Russell

=== Round 12 ===
27 November 2021
14:00

Esher	P – P	Guernsey Raiders

Molesey Road

27 November 2021
14:00

Redruth	10 – 24	Worthing

Recreation Ground
Attendance: 810
Referee: Iain Kly

27 November 2021
14:15

Westcliff	9 – 17	Bury St Edmunds

The Gables
Attendance: 165
Referee: Tom Bird

27 November 2021
14:30

(1 BP) Barnes	33 – 8	Barnstaple

Barn Elms
Attendance: 303
Referee: Philip Russell

27 November 2021
14:30

Clifton	22 – 19	Canterbury (1 BP)

Station Road
Attendance: 156
Referee: James Milliner-Woodcock

27 November 2021
15:00

(1 BP) Henley Hawks	33 – 22	Dings Crusaders (1 BP)

Dry Leas
Attendance: 321
Referee: Neil Sweeney

27 November 2021
15:00

Hinckley	22 – 17	Rochford Hundred (1 BP)

De Montfort Park
Attendance: 350
Referee: Simon Waite

27 November 2021
15:00

(1 BP) Old Albanian	14 – 16	Leicester Lions

Woollam's Playing Fields
Attendance: 421
Referee: Benjamin Wood

=== Round 13 ===
4 December 2021
14:00

Barnstaple	5 – 26	Henley Hawks (1 BP)

Pottingham Road
Attendance: 273
Referee: Benjamin Wood

4 December 2021
14:00

Guernsey Raiders	7 – 38	Old Albanian (1 BP)

Footes Lane
Attendance: 278
Referee: Callum Howard

4 December 2021
14:00

Leicester Lions	P – P	Barnes

Westleigh Park

4 December 2021
14:00

(1 BP) Worthing Raiders	23 – 24	Clifton

Roundstone Lane
Attendance: 450
Referee: Neil Sweeney

4 December 2021
15:00

(2 BP) Bury St Edmunds	36 – 40	Esher (1 BP)

The Haberden
Attendance: 477
Referee: Ricardio Sant'anna

4 December 2021
15:00

(1 BP) Canterbury	52 – 15	Westcliff

Marine Travel Ground
Attendance: 312
Referee: Matthew Sharpe

4 December 2021
15:00

(1 BP) Dings Crusaders	32 – 22	Hinckley (1 BP)

Shaftesbury Park
Attendance: 293
Referee: Callum Watson

4 December 2021
15:00

(2 BP) Rochford Hundred	28 – 34	Redruth (1 BP)

The Rugby Park
Attendance: 300
Referee: Neil Sweeney

=== Round 14 ===
11 December 2021
14:00

Guernsey Raiders	P – P	Bury St Edmunds

Footes Lane

11 December 2021
14:00

Redruth	15 – 0	Dings Crusaders

Recreation Ground
Attendance: 740
Referee: Max Weston

11 December 2021
14:00

Westcliff	12 – 58	Worthing Raiders (1 BP)

The Gables
Attendance: 157
Referee: Alex Rose

11 December 2021
14:30

(1 BP) Clifton	52 – 5	Rochford Hundred

Station Road
Attendance: 212
Referee: Ian Kly

11 December 2021
15:00

(1 BP) Esher	26 – 0	Canterbury

Molesey Road
Attendance: 395
Referee: Matthew Sharpe

11 December 2021
15:00

(2 BP) Henley Hawks	30 – 36	Leicester Lions (1 BP)

Dry Leas
Attendance: 389
Referee: Lloyd Davies

11 December 2021
15:00

(1 BP) Hinckley	46 – 13	Barnstaple

De Montfort Park
Attendance: 500
Referee: Pete Connor

11 December 2021
15:00

Old Albanian	19 – 34	Barnes (1 BP)

Woollam's Playing Fields
Attendance: 366
Referee: Neil Sweeney

=== Round 15 ===
18 December 2021
14:00

Barnes	17 – 17	Henley Hawks

Barn Elms
Attendance: 128
Referee: Ben Rayner

18 December 2021
14:00

Barnstaple	3 – 19	Redruth

Pottingham Road
Attendance: 734
Referee: James Millner-Woodcock

18 December 2021
14:00

Leicester Lions	P – P	Hinckley

Westleigh Park

18 December 2021
14:00

Worthing Raiders	P – P	Esher

Roundstone Lane

18 December 2021
14:15

(1 BP) Canterbury	29 – 17	Guernsey Raiders

Marine Travel Ground
Attendance: 387
Referee: Neil Sweeney

18 December 2021
15:00

Bury St Edmunds	P – P	Old Albanian

The Haberden

18 December 2021
15:00

(1 BP) Dings Crusaders	23 – 29	Clifton

Shaftesbury Park
Attendance: 740
Referee: Dan Parrott

18 December 2021
15:00

(1 BP) Rochford Hundred	28 – 17	Westcliff

The Rugby Park
Attendance: 600
Referee: Johnathan Cook

=== Round 16 ===
8 January 2022
14:00

Guernsey Raiders	P – P	Rochford Hundred

Footes Lane

8 January 2022
14:00

(1 BP) Redruth	14 – 17	Barnes

Recreation Ground
Attendance: 745
Referee: Max Weston

8 January 2022
14:00

Westcliff	P – P	Barnstaple

The Gables

8 January 2022
14:30

(1 BP) Clifton	40 – 22	Leicester Lions

Station Road
Attendance: 173
Referee: Alan Chandrachud

8 January 2022
15:00

(1 BP) Bury St Edmunds	14 – 20	Worthing Raiders

The Haberden
Attendance: 325
Referee: Peter Caunt

8 January 2022
15:00

Canterbury	3 – 12	Old Albanian

Marine Travel Ground
Attendance: 310
Referee: Michael Lamb

8 January 2022
15:00

(1 BP) Esher	37 – 32	Dings Crusaders (2 BP)

Molesey Road
Attendance: 310
Referee: Adam Wookey

8 January 2022
15:00

(2 BP) Hinckley	27 – 29	Henley (1 BP)

De Montfort Park
Attendance: 400
Referee: Dan Parrott

=== Round 17 ===
15 January 2022
14:00

(1 BP) Barnes	26 – 50	Clifton (1 BP)

Barn Elms
Attendance: 506
Referee: Matthew Sharpe

15 January 2022
14:00

Barnstaple	14 – 27	Esher (1 BP)

Pottingham Road
Attendance: 456
Referee: James Millner-Woodcock

15 January 2022
14:00

(1 BP) Guernsey Raiders	31 – 17	Dings Crusaders

Footes Lane
Attendance: 433
Referee: Max Weston

15 January 2022
14:00

(1 BP) Leicester Lions	49 – 12	Westcliff

Westleigh Park
Attendance: 129
Referee: Lloyd Davies

15 January 2022
14:00

(1 BP) Worthing Raiders	33 – 19	Canterbury

Roundstone Lane
Attendance: 550
Referee: Michael Lamb

15 January 2022
15:00

Henley Hawks	21 – 21	Redruth

Dry Leas
Attendance: 429
Referee: Neil Sweeney

15 January 2022
15:00

(2 BP) Old Albanian	26 – 28	Hinckley (1 BP)

Woollam's Playing Fields
Attendance: 501
Referee: Simon Waite

15 January 2022
15:00

(1 BP) Rochford Hundred	18 – 24	Bury St Edmunds

The Rugby Park
Attendance: 403
Referee: Jack Sutton

=== Round 18 ===
22 January 2022
14:00

(1 BP) Redruth	39 – 5	Hinckley

Recreation Ground
Attendance: 650
Referee: Ian Kiy

22 January 2022
14:00

Westcliff	10 – 52	Barnes (1 BP)

The Gables
Attendance: 116
Referee: Philip Russell

22 January 2022
14:00

(1 BP) Worthing Raiders	31 – 7	Old Albanians

Roundstone Lane
Attendance: 470
Referee: Richard Gordon

22 January 2022
14:30

Clifton	21 – 13	Henley Hawks

Station Road
Attendance: 190
Referee: Ben Wood

22 January 2022
15:00

Bury St Edmunds	20 – 19	Dings Crusaders (1 BP)

The Haberden
Attendance: 421
Referee: Matthew Sharpe

22 January 2022
15:00

(1 BP) Canterbury	46 – 17	Rochford Hundred

Marine Travel Ground
Attendance: 298
Referee: Callum Howard

22 January 2022
15:00

(1 BP) Esher	34 – 31	Leicester Lions (2 BP)

Molesey Road
Attendance: 402
Referee: Peter Caunt

22 January 2022
15:00

(1 BP) Guernsey Raiders	50 – 24	Barnstaple

Footes Lane
Attendance: 341
Referee: Tom Bird

=== Round 19 ===
29 January 2022
14:00

Barnes	6 – 16	Esher

Barn Elms
Attendance: 487
Referee: Michael Lamb

29 January 2022
14:00

Barnstaple	0 – 17	Bury St Edmunds

Pottingham Road
Attendance: 420
Referee: James Milliner-Woodcock

29 January 2022
15:00

(1 BP) Dings Crusaders	32 – 6	Canterbury

Shaftesbury Park
Attendance: 209
Referee: Tom Evans-Jones

29 January 2022
15:00

(1 BP) Henley Hawks	48 – 24	Westcliff

Dry Leas
Attendance: 320
Referee: Peter Connor

29 January 2022
15:00

Hinckley	15 – 28	Clifton (1 BP)

De Montfort Park
Attendance: 281
Referee: Dan Woods

29 January 2022
15:00

Leicester Lions	P – P	Guernsey Raiders

Westleigh Park

29 January 2022
15:00

(1 BP) Old Albanian	21 – 28	Redruth (1 BP)

Woollam's Playing Fields
Attendance: 207
Referee: Neil Sweeney

29 January 2022
15:00

Rochford Hundred	14 – 34	Worthing Raiders (1 BP)

The Rugby Park
Attendance: 250
Referee: Tom Bird

=== Round 3, 10, 12, 15 & 16 (rescheduled matches) ===
5 February 2022
14:00

(1 BP) Redruth	43 – 21	Henley Hawks

Recreation Ground
Attendance: 852
Referee: Callum Watson

5 February 2022
14:00

(1 BP) Westcliff	28 – 20	Barnstaple

The Gables
Attendance: 107
Referee: Jack Sutton

5 February 2022
15:00

(1 BP) Bury St Edmunds	44 – 43	Old Albanian (2 BP)

The Haberden
Attendance: 257
Referee: Owen Taylor

5 February 2022
15:00

Esher	27 – 24	Guernsey Raiders (2 BP)

Molesey Road
Attendance: 383
Referee: Mike Lamb

5 February 2022
15:00

Hinckley	P – P	Canterbury

De Montfort Park

5 February 2022
15:00

(1 BP) Leicester Lions	36 – 12	Barnes

Westleigh Park
Attendance: 157
Referee: Lloyd Davies

=== Round 20 ===
12 February 2022
14:00

(1 BP) Guernsey Raiders	28 – 26	Barnes (2 BP)

Footes Lane
Attendance: 205
Referee: Jack Sutton

12 February 2022
14:00

(1 BP) Worthing Raiders	50 – 39	Dings Crusaders (1 BP)

Roundstone Lane
Attendance: 408
Referee: Phil Russell

12 February 2022
14:15

Westcliff	12 – 20	Hinckley

The Gables
Attendance: 171
Referee: Peter Buchanan

12 February 2022
14:30

(2 BP) Clifton	31 – 33	Redruth (1 BP)

Station Road
Attendance: 325
Referee: Neil Sweeney

12 February 2022
15:00

(1 BP) Bury St Edmunds	27 – 21	Leicester Lions (1 BP)

The Haberden
Attendance: 351
Referee: Katherine Richie

12 February 2022
15:00

(1 BP) Canterbury	52 – 22	Barnstaple

Marine Travel Ground
Attendance: 263
Referee: Ben Wood

12 February 2022
15:00

Esher	17 – 39	Henley Hawks (1 BP)

Molesey Road
Attendance: 368
Referee: Calum Howard

12 February 2022
15:00

(2 BP) Rochford Hundred	27 – 31	Old Albanian (1 BP)

The Rugby Park
Attendance: 200
Referee: Michael Lamb

=== Round 21 ===
19 February 2022
14:00

Barnstaple	6 – 21	Worthing Raiders

Pottingham Road
Attendance: 150
Referee: Ricargo Sant'anna

19 February 2022
14:00

Leicester Lions (1 BP)	35 – 0	Canterbury

Westleigh Park
Attendance: 110
Referee: Peter Connor

19 February 2022
14:00

Redruth (1 BP)	40 – 0	Westcliff

Recreation Ground
Attendance: 730
Referee: Lloyd Davies

19 February 2022
14:30

Barnes	6 – 6	Bury St Edmunds

Barn Elms
Attendance: 200
Referee: Michael Lamb

19 February 2022
15:00

Dings Crusaders (1 BP)	53 – 32	Rochford Hundred (1 BP)

Shaftesbury Park
Attendance: 183
Referee: Owen Taylor

19 February 2022
15:00

Henley Hawks (1 BP)	23 – 0	Guernsey Raiders

Dry Leas
Attendance: 226
Referee: Alan Chandrachud

19 February 2022
15:00

Hinckley	15 – 13	Esher (1 BP)

De Montfort Park
Attendance: 400
Referee: Dave Charlton

19 February 2022
15:00

Old Albanian	7 – 52	Clifton (1 BP)

Woollam's Playing Fields
Attendance: 200
Referee: Nathan Howarth

=== Round 22 ===
26 February 2022
13:45

(1 BP) Guernsey Raiders	57 – 12	Hinckley

Footes Lane
Attendance: 197
Referee: Benjamin Wood

26 February 2022
14:00

(1 BP) Rochford Hundred	33 – 9	Barnstaple

The Rugby Park
Attendance: 200
Referee: Alex Rose

26 February 2022
14:00

(1 BP) Worthing Raiders	35 – 19	Leicester Lions

Roundstone Lane
Attendance: 501
Referee: Neil Sweeney

26 February 2022
14:15

(1 BP) Westcliff	31 – 57	Clifton (1 BP)

The Gables
Attendance: 125
Referee: Tom Bird

26 February 2022
15:00

Bury St Edmunds	25 – 25	Henley Hawks

The Haberden
Attendance: 363
Referee: Phil Caunt

26 February 2022
15:00

Canterbury	21 – 12	Barnes

Marine Travel Ground
Attendance: 351
Referee: Michael Lamv

26 February 2022
15:00

(1 BP) Dings Crusaders	46 – 41	Old Albanian (2 BP)

Shaftesbury Park
Attendance: 148
Referee: Ricargo Sant'anna

26 February 2022
15:00

(1 BP) Esher	32 – 12	Redruth

Molesey Road
Attendance: 650
Referee: Richard Gordon

=== Round 23 ===
5 March 2022
14:00

Barnstaple	19 – 31	Dings Crusaders (1 BP)

Pottingham Road
Attendance: 365
Referee: James Milliner-Woodcock

5 March 2022
14:00

(1 BP) Leicester Lions	33 – 17	Rochford Hundred

Westleigh Park
Attendance: 110
Referee: Dan Woods

5 March 2022
14:30

(1 BP) Clifton	24 – 41	Esher (1 BP)

Station Road
Attendance: 211
Referee: Alan Chandrachud

5 March 2022
15:00

(1 BP) Barnes	25 – 26	Worthing Raiders (1 BP)

Barn Elms
Attendance: 176
Referee: Richard Gordon

5 March 2022
15:00

Henley Hawks	12 – 10	Canterbury (1 BP)

Dry Leas
Attendance: 285
Referee: Tim Bird

5 March 2022
15:00

(1 BP) Hinckley	28 – 48	Bury St Edmunds (1 BP)

De Montfort Park
Attendance: 200
Referee: James Dowds

5 March 2022
15:00

(1 BP) Old Albanian	14 – 18	Westcliff

Woollam's Playing Fields
Attendance: 143
Referee: Connor Boyle

5 March 2022
15:30

(1 BP) Redruth	54 – 17	Guernsey Raiders

Recreation Ground
Attendance: 855
Referee: Max Weston

=== Round 24 ===
12 March 2022
14:00

Barnstaple	12 – 36	Old Albanian (1 BP)

Pottingham Road
Attendance: 400
Referee: Tom Evans-Jones

12 March 2022
14:00

(2 BP) Bury St Edmunds	32 – 38	Redruth (1 BP)

The Haberden
Attendance: 431
Referee: Matt Sharpe

12 March 2022
14:00

(2 BP) Guernsey Raiders	24 – 26	Clifton (1 BP)

Footes Lane
Attendance: 400
Referee: Peter Caunt

12 March 2022
15:00

(1 BP) Canterbury	30 – 24	Hinckley (2 BP)

Marine Travel Ground
Attendance: 282
Referee: Jack Sutton

12 March 2022
15:00

Dings Crusaders	24 – 17	Leicester Lions (1 BP)

Shaftesbury Park
Attendance: 152
Referee: Lloyd Davies

12 March 2022
15:00

(1 BP) Esher	81 – 7	Westcliff

Molesey Road
Attendance: 320
Referee: Ben Wood

12 March 2022
15:00

Rochford Hundred	7 – 46	Barnes (1 BP)

The Rugby Park
Attendance: 275
Referee: Neil Sweeney

12 March 2022
15:00

(1 BP) Worthing Raiders	57 – 26	Henley Hawks (1 BP)

Roundstone Lane
Attendance: 525
Referee: Richard Gordon

=== Rescheduled matches ===
18 March 2022
19:30

(1 BP) Guernsey Raiders	15 – 20	Bury St Edmunds

Footes Lane
Attendance: 201
Referee: George Richardson

19 March 2022
14:00

Leicester Lions	26 – 17	Hinckley

Westleigh Park
Attendance: 270
Referee: Callum Watson

19 March 2022
15:00

(2 BP) Worthing Raiders	29 – 30	Esher (1 BP)

Roundstone Lane
Attendance: 827
Referee: Iain Kly

=== Round 25 ===
26 March 2022
14:00

(1 BP) Leicester Lions	36 – 5	Barnstaple

Westleigh Park
Attendance: 187
Referee: Tom Bird

26 March 2022
14:00

(2 BP) Westcliff	26 – 27	Guernsey Raiders (1 BP)

The Gables
Attendance: 127
Referee: Jonathan Cook

26 March 2022
14:30

(1 BP) Clifton	47 – 34	Bury St Edmunds (1 BP)

Station Road
Attendance: 199
Referee: Dan Parrott

26 March 2022
15:00

(1 BP) Barnes	23 – 30	Dings Crusaders

Barn Elms
Attendance: 219
Referee: Alex Rose

26 March 2022
15:00

(2 BP) Henley Hawks	24 – 27	Rochford Hundred

Dry Leas
Attendance: 275
Referee: Neil Sweeney

26 March 2022
15:00

(1 BP) Hinckley	31 – 26	Worthing Raiders (2 BP)

De Montfort Park
Attendance: 300
Referee: Michael Lamb

26 March 2022
15:00

(1 BP) Old Albanian	31 – 40	Esher (1 BP)

Woollam's Playing Fields
Attendance: 289
Referee: Matthew Sharpe

26 March 2022
15:00

(1 BP) Redruth	49 – 10	Canterbury

Recreation Ground
Attendance: 725
Referee: Alan Chandrachud

=== Round 26 ===
2 April 2022
14:00

(1 BP) Leicester Lions	35 – 14	Old Albanian

Westleigh Park
Attendance: 132
Referee: Callum Watson

2 April 2022
14:30

Barnstaple	23 – 14	Barnes

Pottingham Road
Attendance: 563
Referee: Max Weston

2 April 2022
15:00

(1 BP) Bury St Edmunds	61 – 0	Westcliff

The Haberden
Attendance: 479
Referee: Mike Lamb

2 April 2022
15:00

(1 BP) Canterbury	24 – 38	Clifton (1 BP)

Marine Travel Ground
Attendance: 298
Referee: Iain Kly

2 April 2022
15:00

(1 BP) Dings Crusaders	40 – 5	Henley Hawks

Shaftesbury Park
Attendance: 387
Referee: Tom Evans-Jones

2 April 2022
15:00

Guernsey Raiders	12 – 57	Esher (1 BP)

Footes Lane
Attendance: 376
Referee: Matthew Sharpe

2 April 2022
15:00

(1 BP) Rochford Hundred	33 – 5	Hinckley

The Rugby Park
Attendance: 301
Referee: Tom Bird

2 April 2022
15:00

(1 BP) Worthing Raiders	17 – 22	Redruth

Roundstone Lane
Attendance: 289
Referee: Richard Gordon

=== Round 27 ===
9 April 2022
14:00

(1 BP) Old Albanian	36 – 28	Guernsey Raiders (1 BP)

Woollam's Playing Fields
Attendance: 322
Referee: Tom Bird

9 April 2022
14:30

(1 BP) Clifton	31 – 31	Worthing Raiders (1 BP)

Station Road
Attendance: 288
Referee: Neil Sweeney

9 April 2022
15:00

Barnes	10 – 28	Leicester Lions (1 BP)

Barn Elms
Attendance: 130
Referee: Jack Sutton

9 April 2022
15:00

(1 BP) Esher	43 – 22	Bury St Edmunds

Molesey Road
Attendance: 489
Referee: Alan Chandrachud

9 April 2022
15:00

(1 BP) Henley Hawks	48 – 17	Barnstaple

Dry Leas
Attendance: 307
Referee: Katherine Ritchie

9 April 2022
15:00

(2 BP) Hinckley	29 – 34	Dings Crusaders (1 BP)

De Montfort Park
Attendance: 397
Referee: Gavin Jones

9 April 2022
15:00

(1 BP) Redruth	59 – 5	Rochford Hundred

Recreation Ground
Attendance: 825
Referee: Ben Wood

9 April 2022
15:00

Westcliff	19 – 33	Canterbury (1 BP)

The Gables
Attendance: 204
Referee: Connor Boyle

=== Round 28 ===
16 April 2022
13:30

(1 BP) Bury St Edmunds	66 – 24	Guernsey Raiders (1 BP)

The Haberden
Attendance: 637
Referee: James Dowds

16 April 2022
14:00

(1 BP) Leicester Lions	38 – 12	Henley Hawks

Westleigh Park
Attendance: 147
Referee: Neil Chivers

16 April 2022
14:30

Barnstaple	13 – 10	Hinckley (1 BP)

Pottingham Road
Attendance: 288
Referee: James Milliner-Woodcock

16 April 2022
15:00

(1 BP) Barnes	38 – 36	Old Albanian (2 BP)

Barn Elms
Attendance: 115
Referee: Neil Sweeney

16 April 2022
15:00

Canterbury	11 – 33	Esher (1 BP)

Marine Travel Ground
Attendance: 378
Referee: Callum Howard

16 April 2022
15:00

Dings Crusaders	10 – 31	Redruth (1 BP)

Shaftesbury Park
Attendance: 525
Referee: Alan Chandrachud

16 April 2022
15:00

Rochford Hundred	14 – 85	Clifton (1 BP)

The Rugby Park
Attendance: 200
Referee: Ben Wood

16 April 2022
15:00

Worthing Raiders	C – C	Westcliff

Roundstone Lane

=== Round 29 ===
23 April 2022
14:30

(2 BP) Clifton	31 – 32	Dings Crusaders (1 BP)

Station Road
Attendance: 700
Referee: Paul Wigley

23 April 2022
15:00

(1 BP) Esher	39 – 19	Worthing Raiders

Molesey Road
Attendance: 1,350 (Note: Record crowd)
Referee: Jonathan Cook

23 April 2022
15:00

(1 BP) Guernsey Raiders	33 – 33	Canterbury (1 BP)

Footes Lane
Attendance: 598
Referee: Neil Sweeney

23 April 2022
15:00

Henley Hawks	19 – 34	Barnes (1 BP)

Dry Leas
Attendance: 525
Referee: Jamie Parr

23 April 2022
15:00

Hinckley	23 – 50	Leicester Lions (1 BP)

De Montfort Park
Attendance: 600
Referee: Oli Carey

23 April 2022
15:00

(1 BP) Old Albanian	33 – 31	Bury St Edmunds (2 BP)

Woollam's Playing Fields
Attendance: N/A
Referee: Peter Connor

23 April 2022
15:00

(1 BP) Redruth	63 – 14	Barnstaple

Recreation Ground
Attendance: 1,075
Referee: Max Weston

23 April 2022
15:00

Westcliff	20 – 17	Rochford Hundred (1 BP)

The Gables
Attendance: 634
Referee: Calum Howard

=== Round 30 ===
30 April 2022
15:00

(1 BP) Barnes	42 – 17	Hinckley

Duke's Meadows, Chiswick RFC (Note: Game moved to Chiswick RFC .)
Attendance: 301
Referee: Simon Waite

30 April 2022
15:00

Barnstaple	12 – 52	Clifton (1 BP)

Pottingham Road
Attendance: 311
Referee: Simon Wills

30 April 2022
15:00

(1 BP) Canterbury	31 – 34	Bury St Edmunds (1 BP)

Marine Travel Ground
Attendance: 543
Referee: Callum Howard

30 April 2022
15:00

(1 BP) Dings Crusaders	42 – 22	Westcliff (1 BP)

Shaftesbury Park
Attendance: 365
Referee: Peter Connor

30 April 2022
15:00

Guernsey Raiders	21 – 52	Worthing Raiders (1 BP)

Footes Lane
Attendance: 375
Referee: Callum Watson

30 April 2022
15:00

(1 BP) Leicester Lions	24 – 19	Redruth (1 BP)

Westleigh Park
Attendance: 137
Referee: Dan Parrott

30 April 2022
15:00

(1 BP) Old Albanian	38 – 19	Henley Hawks

Woollam's Playing Fields
Attendance: 254
Referee: Benjamin Simpson

30 April 2022
15:00

(1 BP) Rochford Hundred	24 – 55	Esher (1 BP)

The Rugby Park
Attendance: 300
Referee: Tim Allatt

=== Rescheduled matches ===
7 May 2022
14:00

Guernsey Raiders	C – C	Rochford Hundred

Footes Lane

7 May 2022
15:00

Hinckley	C – C	Canterbury

De Montfort Park

7 May 2022
15:00

(1 BP) Leicester Lions	47 – 14	Guernsey Raiders

Westleigh Park
Attendance: 125
Referee: Jack Sutton

== Attendances ==
Club	Home games	Total	Average	Highest	Lowest	% Capacity
Barnes	15	3,472	231	506	115	23%
Barnstaple	15	6,660	444	734	150	22%
Bury St Edmunds	15	6,396	426	637	257	14%
Canterbury	15	5,245	350	543	263	23%
Clifton	15	3,600	240	700	118	11%
Dings Crusaders	15	5,215	348	740	148	15%
Esher	15	7,131	475	1,350	310	14%
Guernsey Raiders	14 (Note: Guernsey Raiders only played 14 homes games as their game versus Rochford Hundred on 7 May 2022 was cancelled.)	6,299	450	900	197	9%
Henley Hawks	15	5,145	343	525	226	9%
Hinckley	14 (Note: Hinckley only played 14 home games as their game versus Canterbury 7 May 2022 was cancelled.)	5,428	388	600	200	19%
Leicester Lions	15	2,573	172	300	110	9%
Old Albanian	14 (Note: Attendance missing for Old Albanian's home game versus Bury St Edmunds on 23 April 2022.)	4,110	294	501	143	29%
Redruth	15	11,621	775	1,075	525	22%
Rochford Hundred	15	4,382	292	600	200	29%
Westcliff	15	3,085	206	634	107	21%
Worthing Raiders	14 (Note: Worthing Raiders only played 14 home games as their game versus Westcliff on 16 April 2022 was cancelled.)	6,763	483	950	249	32%

== Individual statistics ==
- Note that points scorers includes tries as well as conversions, penalties and drop goals.

=== Top points scorers ===
Rank	Player	Team	Points
1	(England) Sam Morley	Esher	310
2	(Wales) Matthew McLean	Worthing Raiders	277
3	(England) Benjamin Young	Leicester Lions	255
4	(England) Luke Cozens	Clifton	242
4	(England) Charlie Reed	Bury St Edmunds	242
5	(England) Daniel Watt	Old Albanian	225
6	(England) Frasey Honey	Redruth	214
7	(England) Joe Wilson	Hinckley	208
8	(England) Robert Kirby	Barnes	169

=== Top try scorers ===
Rank	Player	Team	Tries
1	(England) Finlay Sharp	Clifton	22
2	(England) Reuben Norville	Henley Hawks	19
3	(England) Thomas Anderson	Dings Crusaders	17
3	(England) Richard Brown	Redruth	17
3	(England) Alex Noot	Old Albanian	17
3	(England) Alex Wilcockson	Leicester Lions	17
5	(England) Bradley Talbot	Clifton	16
6	(England) Jack Forrest	Worthing Raiders	15
6	(Wales) Matthew McLean	Worthing Raiders	15

== See also ==
- 2021–22 National League 1
- 2021–22 National League 2 North
