= 2022–23 National League 1 =

Rugby union competition in England

2022–23 National League One
- Countries: England
- Date: 3 September 2022 – 22 April 2023
- Champions: Cambridge (1st title)
- Runners-up: Rams
- Relegated: Esher; Leeds Tykes; Hull
- Matches played: 181
- Attendance: 111,117 (average 614 per match)
- Highest attendance: 2,279 – Darlington Mowden Park v Leeds Tykes, 29 October 2022
- Lowest attendance: 125 – Hull v Cinderford, 12 November 2022
- Tries scored: 1476 (average 8.2 per match)
- Top point scorer: 259 – Sam Morley (Esher)
- Top try scorer: 33 – Nana Asiedu (Cambridge)

2022–23 National League 1 is the 35th season of the third tier of the English domestic rugby union competitions, and following a reorganisation of the league structure, it is reverting to a 14-team format.

== Structure ==
The league consists of fourteen teams, with all the teams playing each other on a home and away basis, to make a total of twenty-six matches each. There is one promotion place, with the champions promoted to the RFU Championship, and there are three relegation places to either, National League 2 East, National League 2 North or National League 2 West, depending on the geographical location of the team.

The results of the matches contribute points to the league table as follows:

- 4 points are awarded for a win
- 2 points are awarded for a draw
- 0 points are awarded for a loss, however
- 1 losing (bonus) point is awarded to a team that loses a match by 7 points or fewer
- 1 additional (bonus) point is awarded to a team scoring 4 tries or more in a match.

== Participating teams and locations ==
2022–23 National 1 teams in England

The reigning champions entering the season are Caldy who were crowned champions on 23 April 2022, following their final match of the season at home to runner-up Sale; beating them 13–9 in front of a club record attendance of 3,023. They were promoted to the RFU Championship. Blackheath (14th position) and Tonbridge Juddians (15th) were relegated to National League 2 East.

Team	Ground	Capacity	City/Area	Previous season
Birmingham Moseley	Billesley Common	5,000 (1,300 seats)	Birmingham, West Midlands	10th
Bishop's Stortford	Silver Leys	1,600	Bishop's Stortford, Hertfordshire	9th
Cambridge	Grantchester Road	2,200 (200 seats)	Cambridge, Cambridgeshire	4th
Chinnor	Kingsey Road	2,000	Thame, Oxfordshire	7th
Cinderford	Dockham Road	2,500	Cinderford, Gloucestershire	5th
Darlington Mowden Park	Northern Echo Arena	25,500	Darlington, County Durham	12th
Esher	Molesey Road	3,500	Hersham, Surrey	Promoted from N2S (1st)
Hull	Ferens Ground	1,500 (288 seats)	Kingston upon Hull, East Riding	Promoted from N2N (1st)
Leeds Tykes	The Sycamores (Note: Leeds Tykes played one home game at Headingley Rugby Stadium on 17 December 2022)	1,500	Bramhope, Leeds, West Yorkshire	13th
Plymouth Albion	The Brickfields	8,500	Plymouth, Devon	11th
Rams	Old Bath Road	2,000 (300 seats)	Sonning, Reading, Berkshire	6th
Rosslyn Park	The Rock	2,000 (630 seats)	Roehampton, London	3rd
Sale FC	Heywood Road	3,387	Sale, Greater Manchester	2nd
Taunton Titans	Veritas Park	2,000 (198 seats)	Taunton, Somerset	8th

== League table ==
2022–23 National League 1 table
Pos	Team	Pld	W	D	L	PF	PA	PD	TB	LB	Pts	Qualification
1	Cambridge (C, P)	26	22	1	3	1002	543	+459	21	3	114	Promoted
2	Rams	26	22	0	4	922	583	+339	24	2	114	
3	Sale FC	26	23	0	3	821	504	+317	20	1	113	
4	Rosslyn Park	25	16	0	9	784	685	+99	17	2	83	
5	Plymouth Albion	26	14	0	12	730	647	+83	19	3	78	
6	Bishop's Stortford	26	13	1	12	664	635	+29	16	7	77	
7	Cinderford	26	12	2	12	720	678	+42	17	6	75	
8	Chinnor	26	12	1	13	720	719	+1	17	4	71	
9	Birmingham Moseley	26	10	2	14	689	795	−106	14	4	62	
10	Darlington Mowden Park	26	10	0	16	680	715	−35	14	7	61	
11	Taunton Titans	26	9	0	17	706	799	−93	13	8	57	
12	Esher (R)	26	9	0	17	692	811	−119	13	4	53	Relegated
13	Leeds Tykes (R)	25	4	2	19	481	821	−340	6	6	32	Relegated
14	Hull (R)	26	0	1	25	434	1110	−676	5	5	12	Relegated

Updated to match(es) played on 29 April 2023. Source: National League 2 East RFU
Rules for classification: If teams are level at any stage, tiebreakers are applied in the following order:
1. Number of matches won
2. Difference between points for and against
3. Total number of points for
4. Aggregate number of points scored in matches between tied teams
5. Number of matches won excluding the first match, then the second and so on until the tie is settled
  (C) Champion; (P) Promoted; (R) Relegated

== Fixtures & results ==
Fixtures for the season were announced by the RFU on 13 June 2022.

=== Round 1 ===
3 September 2022
15:00

Birmingham Moseley	13 – 32	Sale FC (1 BP)

Billesley Common
Attendance: 1,113
Referee: Adam Wookey

3 September 2022
15:00

(1 BP) Bishop's Stortford	44 – 20	Hull

Silver Leys
Attendance: 320
Referee: Hamish Grant

3 September 2022
15:00

(1 BP) Cambridge	34 – 28	Plymouth Albion (2 BP)

Grantchester Road
Attendance: 330
Referee: Daniel Rowlands

3 September 2022
15:00

Darlington Mowden Park	23 – 16	Chinnor

Northern Echo Arena
Attendance: 762
Referee: Tim Allatt

3 September 2022
15:00

(1 BP) Leeds Tykes	24 – 28	Taunton Titans (1 BP)

The Sycamores
Attendance: 256
Referee: Andrew Wigley

3 September 2022
15:00

(1 BP) Rams	38 – 21	Esher

Old Bath Road
Attendance: 623
Referee: Jonathan Cook

3 September 2022
15:00

(1 BP) Rosslyn Park	46 – 26	Cinderford (1 BP)

The Rock
Attendance: 540
Referee: Richard Gordon

=== Round 2 ===
9 September 2022
19:45

Chinnor	30 – 46	Rams (1 BP)

Kingsey Road
Attendance: 814
Referee: Andy Wigley

10 September 2022
14:00

(1 BP) Hull	22 – 29	Darlington Mowden Park (1 BP)

Ferens Ground
Attendance: 315
Referee: Callum Howard

10 September 2022
14:30

(1 BP) Sale FC	56 – 8	Leeds Tykes

Heywood Road
Attendance: 546
Referee: James O'Brien

10 September 2022
15:00

(2 BP) Bishop's Stortford	30 – 36	Cambridge (1 BP)

Silver Leys
Attendance: 550
Referee: Alan Chandrachud

10 September 2022
15:00

Cinderford (1 BP)	37 – 25	Birmingham Moseley

Dockham Road
Attendance: 370
Referee: Adam Wookey

10 September 2022
15:00

Esher (2 BP)	27 – 32	Rosslyn Park (1 BP)

Molesey Road
Attendance: 725
Referee: Matthew Sharpe

10 September 2022
15:45

Taunton Titans	26 – 33	Plymouth Albion (1 BP)

Veritas Park
Attendance: 532
Referee: Hamish Robert Grant

=== Round 3 ===
16 September 2022
19:30

(1 BP) Birmingham Moseley	35 – 24	Esher (1 BP)

Billesley Common
Attendance: 625
Referee: Timothy Allatt

16 September 2022
20:00

(1 BP) Rosslyn Park	42 – 14	Chinnor

The Rock
Attendance: 620
Referee: Jonathan Cook

17 September 2022
15:00

(1 BP) Cambridge	39 – 14	Taunton Titans

Grantchester Road
Attendance: 306
Referee: Matthew Sharpe

17 September 2022
15:00

(1 BP) Darlington Mowden Park	24 – 25	Bishop's Stortford

Northern Echo Arena
Attendance: 912
Referee: Owen Taylor

17 September 2022
15:00

Leeds Tykes	12 – 24	Cinderford (1 BP)

The Sycamores
Attendance: 248
Referee: Ben Rayner

17 September 2022
15:00

(2 BP) Plymouth Albion	24 – 27	Sale FC (1 BP)

The Brickfields
Attendance: 950
Referee: Iain Kiy

17 September 2022
15:00

(1 BP) Rams	59 – 26	Hull

Old Bath Road
Attendance: 431
Referee: Adam Wookey

=== Round 4 ===
24 September 2022
14:00

Hull	19 – 66	Rosslyn Park (1 BP)

Ferens Ground
Attendance: 375
Referee: Owen Taylor

24 September 2022
14:30

(1 BP) Sale FC	31 – 24	Taunton Titans (2 BP)

Heywood Road
Attendance: 1,160
Referee: Hamish Grant

24 September 2022
15:00

Bishop's Stortford	10 – 40	Rams (1 BP)

Silver Leys
Attendance: 400
Referee: Tim Allatt

24 September 2022
15:00

(1 BP) Chinnor	38 – 21	Birmingham Moseley

Kingsey Road
Attendance: 426
Referee: Richard Gordon

24 September 2022
15:00

(1 BP) Cinderford	41 – 28	Plymouth Albion (1 BP)

Dockham Road
Attendance: 410
Referee: Daniel Rowlands

24 September 2022
15:00

(2 BP) Darlington Mowden Park	31 – 32	Cambridge (1 BP)

Northern Echo Arena
Attendance: 612
Referee: Alan Chandrachud

24 September 2022
15:00

(1 BP) Esher	24 – 26	Leeds Tykes (1 BP)

Molesey Road
Attendance: 753
Referee: Calum Howard

=== Round 5 ===
1 October 2022
15:00

(1 BP) Birmingham Moseley	43 – 26	Hull

Billesley Common
Attendance: 548
Referee: Andrew Wigley

1 October 2022
15:00

(1 BP) Cambridge	32 – 19	Sale FC

Grantchester Road
Attendance: 346
Referee: Jonathan Cook

1 October 2022
15:00

Leeds Tykes	27 – 24	Chinnor (1 BP)

The Sycamores
Attendance: 538
Referee: James O'Brien

1 October 2022
15:00

(1 BP) Plymouth Albion	45 – 29	Esher (1 BP)

The Brickfields
Attendance: 1,088
Referee: Adam Wookey

1 October 2022
15:00

(1 BP) Rams	40 – 15	Darlington Mowden Park

Old Bath Road
Attendance: 522
Referee: Hamish Grant

1 October 2022
15:00

(1 BP) Rosslyn Park	33 – 29	Bishop's Stortford (1 BP)

The Rock
Attendance: 491
Referee: Calum Howard

1 October 2022
15:00

Taunton Titans	12 – 23	Cinderford

Veritas Park
Attendance: 582
Referee: Iain Kiy

=== Round 6 ===
15 October 2022
14:00

(1 BP) Hull	22 – 27	Leeds Tykes (1 BP)

Ferens Ground
Attendance: 284
Referee: Timothy Allatt

15 October 2022
15:00

(1 BP) Bishop's Stortford	29 – 23	Birmingham Moseley (1 BP)

Silver Leys
Attendance: 400
Referee: Calum Howard

15 October 2022
15:00

Chinnor	22 – 30	Plymouth Albion (1 BP)

Kingsey Road
Attendance: 353
Referee: Jonathan Cook

15 October 2022
15:00

(1 BP) Cinderford	27 – 26	Sale FC (2 BP)

Dockham Road
Attendance: 370
Referee: Hamish Grant

15 October 2022
15:00

(2 BP) Darlington Mowden Park	28 – 35	Rosslyn Park (1 BP)

Northern Echo Arena
Attendance: 741
Referee: Daniel Rowlands

15 October 2022
15:00

Esher	21 – 29	Taunton Titans (1 BP)

Molesey Road
Attendance: 769
Referee: Alan Chandrachud

15 October 2022
15:00

(1 BP) Rams	29 – 26	Cambridge (2 BP)

Old Bath Road
Attendance: 665
Referee: Richard Gordon

=== Round 7 ===
22 October 2022
14:30

(1 BP) Sale FC	35 – 21	Esher

Heywood Road
Attendance: 666
Referee: Andrew Wigley

22 October 2022
15:00

(1 BP) Birmingham Moseley	32 – 30	Darlington Mowden Park (2 BP)

Billesley Common
Attendance: 256
Referee: Iain Kiy

22 October 2022
15:00

(1 BP) Cambridge	40 – 29	Cinderford (1 BP)

Grantchester Road
Attendance: 379
Referee: Jonathan Cook

22 October 2022
15:00

Leeds Tykes	13 – 27	Bishop's Stortford (1 BP)

The Sycamores
Attendance: 621
Referee: Richard Gordon

22 October 2022
15:00

(1 BP) Plymouth Albion	48 – 5	Hull

The Brickfields
Attendance: 914
Referee: Daniel Rowlands

22 October 2022
15:00

Rosslyn Park	21 – 29	Rams (1 BP)

The Rock
Attendance: 1,017
Referee: Hamish Grant

22 October 2022
15:00

Taunton Titans	21 – 31	Chinnor (1 BP)

Veritas Park
Attendance: 311
Referee: Alan Chandrachud

=== Round 8 ===
28 October 2022
19:30

(1 BP) Darlington Mowden Park	29 – 20	Leeds Tykes

Northern Echo Arena
Attendance: 2,279
Referee: Tim Allat

29 October 2022
14:00

(1 BP) Hull	28 – 36	Taunton Titans (1 BP)

Ferens Ground
Attendance: 155
Referee: Richard Gordon

29 October 2022
15:00

(1 BP) Bishop's Stortford	31 – 19	Plymouth Albion

Silver Leys
Attendance: 540
Referee: Hamish Grant

29 October 2022
15:00

Chinnor	18 – 37	Sale (1 BP)

Kingsey Road
Attendance: 326
Referee: Daniel Rowlands

29 October 2022
15:00

Esher	25 – 42	Cinderford (1 BP)

Molesey Road
Attendance: 642
Referee: Jonathan Cook

29 October 2022
15:00

(1 BP) Rams	50 – 25	Birmingham Moseley

Old Bath Road
Attendance: 927
Referee: Alan Chandrachud

29 October 2022
15:00

(2 BP) Rosslyn Park	22 – 24	Cambridge

The Rock
Attendance: 615
Referee: Adam Wookey

=== Round 9 ===
5 November 2022
14:30

(1 BP) Cambridge	38 – 24	Esher (1 BP)

Grantchester Road
Attendance: 409
Referee: Matthew Sharpe

5 November 2022
14:30

Leeds Tykes	10 – 36	Rams (1 BP)

The Sycamores
Attendance: 1,417
Referee: Adam Wookey

5 November 2022
14:30

(1 BP) Sale	34 – 7	Hull

Heywood Road
Attendance: 546
Referee: Jonathan Cook

5 November 2022
15:00

Cinderford	10 – 10	Chinnor

Dockham Road
Attendance: 320
Referee: Alan Chandrachud

5 November 2022
15:00

(1 BP) Birmingham Moseley	36 – 47	Rosslyn Park (1 BP)

Billesley Common
Attendance: 609
Referee: Daniel Rowlands

5 November 2022
15:00

(1 BP) Plymouth Albion	36 – 24	Darlington Mowden Park

The Brickfields
Attendance: 790
Referee: Andrew Wigley

5 November 2022
15:00

(2 BP) Taunton Titans	24 – 31	Bishop's Stortford (1 BP)

Veritas Park
Attendance: 425
Referee: Iain Kiy

=== Round 10 ===
12 November 2022
14:00

(1 BP) Hull	30 – 30	Cinderford (1 BP)

Ferens Ground
Attendance: 125
Referee: Ben Rayner

12 November 2022
15:00

(1 BP) Birmingham Moseley	29 – 26	Cambridge (2 BP)

Billesley Common
Attendance: 476
Referee: Owen Taylor

12 November 2022
15:00

(1 BP) Bishop's Stortford	22 – 29	Sale (1 BP)

Silver Leys
Attendance: 350
Referee: Richard Gordon

12 November 2022
15:00

(1 BP) Chinnor	33 – 41	Esher (1 BP)

Kingsey Road
Attendance: 389
Referee: Max Weston

12 November 2022
15:00

(1 BP) Darlington Mowden Park	40 – 13	Taunton Titans

Northern Echo Arena
Attendance: 744
Referee: Matthew Sharpe

12 November 2022
15:00

(1 BP) Rams	26 – 14	Plymouth Albion

Old Bath Road
Attendance: 813
Referee: Daniel Rowlands

12 November 2022
15:00

(1 BP) Rosslyn Park	40 – 12	Leeds Tykes

The Rock
Attendance: 464
Referee: Calum Howard

=== Round 11 ===
26 November 2022
14:00

(1 BP) Cambridge	31 – 27	Chinnor (2 BP)

Grantchester Road
Attendance: 304
Referee: Richard Gordon

26 November 2022
14:30

Leeds Tykes	21 – 21	Birmingham Moseley

The Sycamores
Attendance: 414
Referee: Jonathan Cook

26 November 2022
14:30

(1 BP) Sale	34 – 31	Darlington Mowden Park (2 BP)

Heywood Road
Attendance: 566
Referee: James O'Brien

26 November 2022
15:00

(1 BP) Cinderford	24 – 22	Bishop's Stortford (1 BP)

Dockham Road
Attendance: 234
Referee: Iain Kiy

26 November 2022
15:00

(1 BP) Esher	34 – 0	Hull

Molesey Road
Attendance: 600
Referee: Mat Sharp

26 November 2022
15:00

Plymouth Albion	13 – 10	Rosslyn Park (1 BP)

The Brickfields
Attendance: 735
Referee: Adam Wookey

26 November 2022
15:00

(2 BP) Taunton Titans	24 – 27	Rams (1 BP)

Veritas Park
Attendance: 362
Referee: Andrew Paul Wigley

=== Round 12 ===
3 December 2022
14:00

Hull	15 – 29	Chinnor (1 BP)

Ferens Ground
Attendance: 147
Referee: Owen Taylor

3 December 2022
14:30

Leeds Tykes	17 – 17	Cambridge

The Sycamores
Attendance: 530
Referee: Andrew Wigley

3 December 2022
15:00

(1 BP) Bishop's Stortford	38 – 30	Esher

Silver Leys
Attendance: 535
Referee: Matthew Sharpe

3 December 2022
15:00

(1 BP) Darlington Mowden Park	33 – 15	Cinderford

Northern Echo Arena
Attendance: 688
Referee: Ben Rayner

3 December 2022
15:00

(1 BP) Birmingham Moseley	35 – 14	Plymouth Albion

Billesley Common
Attendance: 492
Referee: Neil Sweeney

3 December 2022
15:00

(2 BP) Rams	24 – 27	Sale (1 BP)

Old Bath Road
Attendance: 985
Referee: Adam Wookey

3 December 2022
15:00

(1 BP) Rosslyn Park	52 – 0	Taunton Titans

The Rock
Attendance: 467
Referee: Jonathan Cook

=== Round 13 ===
10 December 2022
14:00

Cambridge	P – P	Hull

Grantchester Road

10 December 2022
14:30

(1 BP) Sale	24 – 15	Rosslyn Park

Heywood Road
Attendance: 736
Referee: Richard Gordon

10 December 2022
15:00

Chinnor	P – P	Bishop's Stortford

Kinsey Road

10 December 2022
15:00

(1 BP) Cinderford	37 – 17	Rams

Dockham Road
Attendance: 352
Referee: Andy Wigley

10 December 2022
15:00

Esher	18 – 17	Darlington Mowden Park (1 BP)

Molesey Road
Attendance: 754
Referee: Max Weston

10 December 2022
15:00

Plymouth Albion	P – P	Leeds Tykes

The Brickfields

10 December 2022
15:00

(1 BP) Taunton Titans	21 – 26	Birmingham Moseley (1 BP)

Veritas Park
Attendance: 610
Referee: Jonathan Cooke

=== Round 14 ===
16 December 2022
19:45

Rams	P – P	Chinnor

Old Bath Road

16 December 2022
20:00

(1 BP) Rosslyn Park	48 – 32	Esher (1 BP)

The Rock
Attendance: 555
Referee: Matthew Sharpe

17 December 2022
14:00

Cambridge	P – P	Bishop's Stortford

Grantchester Road

17 December 2022
14:00

(1 BP) Leeds Tykes	15 – 20	Sale

Headingley Stadium
Attendance: 728
Referee: Owen Taylor

17 December 2022
15:00

Darlington Mowden Park	P – P	Hull

Northern Echo Arena

17 December 2022
15:00

Birmingham Moseley	P – P	Cinderford

Billesley Common

17 December 2022
15:00

(1 BP) Plymouth Albion	26 – 14	Taunton Titans

The Brickfields
Attendance: 1,003
Referee: Max Weston

=== Round 15 ===
6 January 2023
19:45

(1 BP) Chinnor	48 – 12	Rosslyn Park

Kingsey Road
Attendance: 734
Referee: Alan Chandrachud

7 January 2023
14:00

(1 BP) Hull	19 – 24	Rams (1 BP)

Ferens Ground
Attendance: 218
Referee: Ben Raynor

7 January 2023
14:30

(1 BP) Sale	45 – 35	Plymouth Albion (1 BP)

Heywood Road
Attendance: 657
Referee: Daniel Rowlands

7 January 2023
15:00

Bishop's Stortford	12 – 10	Darlington Mowden Park (1 BP)

Silver Leys
Attendance: 310
Referee: Max Weston

7 January 2023
15:00

Esher	24 – 14	Birmingham Moseley

Molesey Road
Attendance: 748
Referee: Owen Taylor

7 January 2023
15:00

Cinderford	23 – 17	Leeds Tykes (1 BP)

Dockham Road
Attendance: 329
Referee: Tim Allatt

7 January 2023
15:00

Taunton Titans	8 – 36	Cambridge (1 BP)

Veritas Park
Attendance: 382
Referee: Andrew Paul Wigley

=== Round 16 ===
14 January 2023
14:00

(1 BP) Cambridge	34 – 15	Darlington Mowden Park

Grantchester Road
Attendance: 371
Referee: Alan Chandrachud

14 January 2023
14:30

(2 BP) Leeds Tykes	24 – 30	Esher (1 BP)

The Sycamores
Attendance: 341
Referee: Daniel Rowlands

14 January 2023
15:00

(1 BP) Birmingham Moseley	29 – 37	Chinnor (1 BP)

Billesley Common
Attendance: 588
Referee: Iain Kiy

14 January 2023
15:00

Plymouth Albion	17 – 10	Cinderford (1 BP)

The Brickfields
Attendance: 1,275
Referee: Matt Sharpe

14 January 2023
15:00

(1 BP) Rams	26 – 14	Bishop's Stortford

Old Bath Road
Attendance: 538
Referee: Andy Wigley

14 January 2023
15:00

(1 BP) Rosslyn Park	38 – 28	Hull (1 BP)

The Rock
Attendance: 471
Referee: Neil Sweeney

14 January 2023
15:00

(1 BP) Taunton Titans	14 – 19	Sale

Veritas Park
Attendance: 523
Referee: Max Weston

=== Round 17 ===
21 January 2023
14:00

Hull	P – P	Birmingham Moseley

Ferens Ground

21 January 2023
14:30

Sale	19 – 35	Cambridge (1 BP)

Heywood Road
Attendance: 567
Referee: Richard Gordon

21 January 2023
15:00

(1 BP) Bishop's Stortford	10 – 13	Rosslyn Park

Silver Leys
Attendance: 560
Referee: Owen Taylor

21 January 2023
15:00

Chinnor	P – P	Leeds Tykes

Kingsey Road

21 January 2023
15:00

Cinderford	P – P	Taunton Titans

Dockham Road

21 January 2023
15:00

Darlington Mowden Park	P – P	Rams

Northern Echo Arena

21 January 2023
15:00

(1 BP) Esher	34 – 24	Plymouth Albion (1 BP)

Molesey Road
Attendance: 678
Referee: Iain Kiy

=== Round 18 ===
28 January 2023
14:00

(1 BP) Cambridge	27 – 33	Rams (1 BP)

Grantchester Road
Attendance: 512
Referee: Andrew Wigley

28 January 2023
14:30

(1 BP) Leeds Tykes	36 – 12	Hull

The Sycamores
Attendance: 357
Referee: Ben Rayner

28 January 2023
14:30

(1 BP) Plymouth Albion	28 – 12	Chinnor

The Brickfields
Attendance: 1,384
Referee: Alan Chandrachud

28 January 2023
14:30

Sale	24 – 17	Cinderford (1 BP)

Heywood Road
Attendance: 456
Referee: Owen Taylor

28 January 2023
15:00

(1 BP) Birmingham Moseley	34 – 34	Bishop's Stortford (1 BP)

Billesley Common
Attendance: 561
Referee: Tim Allatt

28 January 2023
15:00

(1 BP) Rosslyn Park	31 – 3	Darlington Mowden Park

The Rock
Attendance: 420
Referee: Richard Gordon

28 January 2023
15:00

Taunton Titans	27 – 18	Esher

Veritas Park
Attendance: 684
Referee: Daniel Rowlands

=== Rescheduled matches ===
4 February 2023
14:00

(1 BP) Cambridge	66 – 10	Hull

Grantchester Road
Attendance: 267
Referee: Neil Sweeney

4 February 2023
15:00

Darlington Mowden Park	21 – 37	Rams (1 BP)

Northern Echo Arena
Attendance: 652
Referee: Tim Allatt

4 February 2023
15:00

(1 BP) Birmingham Moseley	39 – 28	Cinderford (1 BP)

Billesley Common
Attendance: 410
Referee: Daniel Rowlands

4 February 2023
15:00

(1 BP) Plymouth Albion	51 – 12	Leeds Tykes

The Brickfields
Attendance: 668
Referee: Iain Kiy

4 February 2023
16:30

(1 BP) Chinnor	33 – 29	Bishop's Stortford (2 BP)

Kingsey Road
Attendance: 327
Referee: Richard Gordon

=== Rescheduled matches (Round 14) ===
10 February 2023
19:45

(1 BP) Rams	50 – 31	Chinnor (1 BP)

Old Bath Road
Attendance: 1,023
Referee: Iain Kiy

11 February 2023
14:00

(1 BP) Cambridge	40 – 38	Bishop's Stortford (2 BP)

Grantchester Road
Attendance: 546
Referee: Daniel Rowlands

11 February 2023
15:00

(1 BP) Cinderford	38 – 36	Taunton Titans (2 BP)

Dockham Road
Attendance: 275
Referee: Alan Chandrachud

11 February 2023
15:00

(1 BP) Darlington Mowden Park	53 – 16	Hull

Northern Echo Arena
Attendance: 624
Referee: Timothy Allatt

=== Round 19 ===
18 February 2023
14:00

Hull	12 – 41	Plymouth Albion (1 BP)

Ferens Ground
Attendance: 224
Referee: Peter Connor

18 February 2023
15:00

Bishop's Stortford	17 – 14	Leeds Tykes (1 BP)

Silver Leys
Attendance: 560
Referee: Tim Allatt

18 February 2023
15:00

(1 BP) Chinnor	28 – 50	Taunton Titans (1 BP)

Kingsey Road
Attendance: 589
Referee: Daniel Rowlands

18 February 2023
15:00

(1 BP) Cinderford	12 – 17	Cambridge

Dockham Road
Attendance: 275
Referee: Iain Kiy

18 February 2023
15:00

Darlington Mowden Park	22 – 21	Birmingham Moseley (1 BP)

Northern Echo Arena
Attendance: 817
Referee: Matt Sharpe

18 February 2023
15:00

(1 BP) Esher	27 – 54	Sale (1 BP)

Molesey Road
Attendance: 1,005
Referee: Richard Gordon

18 February 2023
15:00

(1 BP) Rams	43 – 10	Rosslyn Park

Old Bath Road
Attendance: 953
Referee: Richard Gordon

=== Round 20 ===
25 February 2023
13:00

(1 BP) Leeds Tykes	25 – 27	Darlington Mowden Park (1 BP)

The Sycamores
Attendance: 648
Referee: Owen Taylor

25 February 2023
14:00

(1 BP) Cambridge	50 – 28	Rosslyn Park (1 BP)

Grantchester Road
Attendance: 399
Referee: Daniel Rowlands

25 February 2023
14:30

(1 BP) Sale	27 – 17	Chinnor

Heywood Road
Attendance: 457
Referee: Andy Wigley

25 February 2023
15:00

(1 BP) Birmingham Moseley	21 – 24	Rams (1 BP)

Billesley Common
Attendance: 874
Referee: Ben Raynor

25 February 2023
15:00

(1 BP) Cinderford	35 – 47	Esher (1 BP)

Dockham Road
Attendance: 278
Referee: Alan Chandrachud

25 February 2023
15:00

Plymouth Albion	12 – 24	Bishop's Stortford (1 BP)

The Brickfields
Attendance: 987
Referee: Max Weston

25 February 2023
15:00

(1 BP) Taunton Titans	73 – 18	Hull

Veritas Park
Attendance: 805
Referee: Richard Gordon

=== Round 21 ===
4 March 2023
14:00

(1 BP) Hull	12 – 19	Sale

Ferens Ground
Attendance: 245
Referee: Owen Taylor

4 March 2023
15:00

(1 BP) Bishop's Stortford	39 – 7	Taunton Titans

Silver Leys
Attendance: 650
Referee: Tim Allatt

4 March 2023
15:00

(1 BP) Chinnor	26 – 22	Cinderford (1 BP)

Kingsey Road
Attendance: 416
Referee: Daniel Rowlands

4 March 2023
15:00

(1 BP) Darlington Mowden Park	33 – 26	Plymouth Albion (2 BP)

Northern Echo Arena
Attendance: 783
Referee: Richard Gordon

4 March 2023
15:00

Esher	22 – 56	Cambridge (1 BP)

Molesey Road
Attendance: 525
Referee: Alan Chandrachud

4 March 2023
15:00

(1 BP) Rams	52 – 24	Leeds Tykes (1 BP)

Old Bath Road
Attendance: 672
Referee: Matthew Sharpe

4 March 2023
15:00

Rosslyn Park	21 – 19	Birmingham Moseley (1 BP)

The Rock
Attendance: 450
Referee: Andy Wigley

=== Round 22 ===
10 March 2023
19:45

(1 BP) Esher	22 – 24	Chinnor (1 BP)

Molesey Road
Attendance: 302
Referee: Iain Kiy

11 March 2023
13:30

Leeds Tykes	P – P	Rosslyn Park

The Sycamores

11 March 2023
14:30

(1 BP) Sale	31 – 7	Bishop's Stortford

Heywood Road
Attendance: 550
Referee: Andy Wigley

11 March 2023
15:00

Cambridge	P – P	Hull

Grantchester Road

11 March 2023
15:00

(1 BP) Cinderford	50 – 0	Hull

Dockham Road
Attendance: 275
Referee: Max Weston

11 March 2023
15:00

(1 BP) Plymouth Albion	27 – 24	Rams (2 BP)

The Brickfields
Attendance: 1,647
Referee: Daniel Rowlands

11 March 2023
15:00

(1 BP) Taunton Titans	35 – 26	Darlington Mowden Park

Veritas Park
Attendance: 665
Referee: Alan Chandrachud

=== Rescheduled matches ===
18 March 2023
14:00

Hull	17 – 35	Birmingham Moseley (1 BP)

Ferens Ground
Attendance: 167
Referee: Daniel Rowlands

18 March 2023
15:00

(1 BP) Chinnor	42 – 17	Leeds Tykes

Kingsey Road
Attendance: 329
Referee: Matt Sharpe

=== Round 23 ===
25 March 2023
14:00

(1 BP) Hull	26 – 27	Esher (1 BP)

Ferens Ground
Attendance: 215
Referee: Richard Gordon

25 March 2023
15:00

(1 BP) Birmingham Moseley	29 – 21	Leeds Tykes

Billesley Common
Attendance: 1,637
Referee: Iain Kiy

25 March 2023
15:00

Bishop's Stortford	19 – 18	Cinderford (1 BP)

Silver Leys
Attendance: 500
Referee: Neil Sweeney

25 March 2023
15:00

(1 BP) Chinnor	17 – 19	Cambridge

Kingsey Road
Attendance: 467
Referee: Andy Wigley

25 March 2023
15:00

Darlington Mowden Park	10 – 35	Sale (1 BP)

Northern Echo Arena
Attendance: 755
Referee: Owen Taylor

25 March 2023
15:00

(1 BP) Rams	59 – 21	Taunton Titans

Old Bath Road
Attendance: 892
Referee: Tim Allatt

25 March 2023
15:00

(1 BP) Rosslyn Park	41 – 32	Plymouth Albion (1 BP)

The Rock
Attendance: 541
Referee: Alan Chandrachud

=== Round 24 ===
1 April 2023
14:30

(1 BP) Sale	35 – 12	Rams

Heywood Road
Attendance: 1,450
Referee: Richard Gordon

1 April 2023
15:00

(1 BP) Cambridge	75 – 10	Leeds Tykes

Grantchester Road
Attendance: 451
Referee: Matthew Sharpe

1 April 2023
15:00

(1 BP) Chinnor	41 – 15	Hull

Kingsey Road
Attendance: 402
Referee: Alan Chandrachud

1 April 2023
15:00

(1 BP) Cinderford	43 – 34	Darlington Mowden Park (1 BP)

Dockham Road
Attendance: 450
Referee: Michael Lamb

1 April 2023
15:00

(1 BP) Esher	31 – 13	Bishop's Stortford

Molesey Road
Attendance: 1,027
Referee: Daniel Rowlands

1 April 2023
15:00

(1 BP) Plymouth Albion	33 – 24	Birmingham Moseley (1 BP)

The Brickfields
Attendance: 1,086
Referee: Owen Taylor

1 April 2023
15:00

(1 BP) Taunton Titans	57 – 26	Rosslyn Park (1 BP)

Veritas Park
Attendance: 854
Referee: Andrew Wigley

=== Round 25 ===
15 April 2023
14:00

Hull	12 – 82	Cambridge (1 BP)

Ferens Ground
Attendance: 456
Referee: Timothy Allatt

15 April 2023
14:00

Leeds Tykes	21 – 36	Plymouth Albion (1 BP)

The Sycamores
Attendance: 431
Referee: Callum Watson

15 April 2023
15:00

(1 BP) Birmingham Moseley	32 – 31	Taunton Titans (2 BP)

Billesley Common
Attendance: 750
Referee: Matthew Sharpe

15 April 2023
15:00

Bishop's Stortford	26 – 34	Chinnor (1 BP)

Silver Leys
Attendance: 650
Referee: Jamie Parr

15 April 2023
15:00

Darlington Mowden Park	25 – 20	Esher (1 BP)

Northern Echo Arena
Attendance: 1,027
Referee: Andrew Wigley

15 April 2023
15:00

(1 BP) Rams	38 – 28	Cinderford (1 BP)

Old Bath Road
Attendance: 1,284
Referee: Daniel Rowlands

15 April 2023
15:00

Rosslyn Park	19 – 33	Sale (1 BP)

The Rock
Attendance: 639
Referee: Alan Chandrachud

=== Round 26 ===
22 April 2023
15:00

(1 BP) Chinnor	38 – 29	Darlington Mowden Park (1 BP)

Kingsey Road
Attendance: 654
Referee: Calum Watson

22 April 2023
15:00

(2 BP) Cinderford	31 – 38	Rosslyn Park (1 BP)

Dockham Road
Attendance: 456
Referee: Mathew Sharpe

22 April 2023
15:00

Esher	19 – 33	Rams (1 BP)

Molesey Road
Attendance: 1,170
Referee: Alan Chandrachud

22 April 2023
15:00

Hull	17 – 44	Bishop's Stortford (1 BP)

Ferens Ground
Attendance: 450
Referee: Benjamin Wood

22 April 2023
15:00

Plymouth Albion	10 – 31	Cambridge (1 BP)

The Brickfields
Attendance: 1,443
Referee: Richard Gordon

22 April 2023
15:00

(1 BP) Sale	49 – 18	Birmingham Moseley

Heywood Road
Attendance: 546
Referee: Neil Sweeney

22 April 2023
15:00

(1 BP) Taunton Titans	59 – 28	Leeds Tykes (1 BP)

Veritas Park
Attendance: 1,147
Referee: Tim Allatt

=== Rescheduled matches ===
29 April 2023
13:30

Leeds Tykes	Cancelled	Rosslyn Park

The Sycamores

29 April 2023
15:00

(1 BP) Cambridge	59 – 10	Moseley

Grantchester Road
Attendance: 1,241
Referee: Daniel Rowlands

== Attendances ==
Club	Home games	Total	Average	Highest	Lowest	% Capacity
Birmingham Moseley	13	8,939	688	1,637	256	14%
Bishop's Stortford	13	6,325	487	650	310	30%
Cambridge	13	5,861	451	1,241	267	20%
Chinnor	13	6,226	479	814	326	24%
Cinderford	13	4,394	338	456	234	14%
Darlington Mowden Park	13	11,396	877	2,279	612	3%
Esher	13	9,698	746	1,170	302	21%
Hull	13	3,376	260	456	125	17%
Leeds Tykes	12 (Note: Leeds Tykes only played 12 home games as final match versus Rosslyn Park on 29 April 2023 was cancelled.)	6,529	544	1,417	248	33%
Plymouth Albion	13	13,970	1,075	1,647	668	13%
Rams	13	10,328	794	1,284	431	40%
Rosslyn Park	13	7,290	561	1,017	420	28%
Sale FC	13	8,903	685	1,450	456	20%
Taunton Titans	13	7,882	606	1,147	311	30%

== Individual statistics ==
=== Top points scorers ===
Rank	Player	Team	Points
1	Sam Morley	Esher	259
2	Michael Austin	Cinderford	241
3	Steffan James	Cambridge	228
4	Matthew Minogue	Darlington Mowden Park	177
5	Nana Asiedu	Cambridge	165

=== Top try scorers ===
Rank	Player	Team	Tries
1	Nana Asiedu	Cambridge	33
2	Benjamin Brownlie	Cambridge	28
3	Nathan Taylor	Cinderford	24
4	Joshua Brown	Sale FC	21
5	Jak Rossiter	Rams	20

== See also ==
- 2022–23 National League 2 North
- 2022–23 National League 2 East
- 2022–23 National League 2 West
