= 2022–23 National League 2 West =

Rugby union competition in England

- Date: 3 September 2022 – 6 May 2023
- Champions: Leicester Lions (1st title)
- Relegated: Barnstaple; Stourbridge
- Matches played: 181
- Attendance: 63,788 (average 352 per match)
- Highest attendance: 852 – Redruth v Dings Crusaders, 22 October 2022
- Lowest attendance: 84 – Exeter University v Luctonians, 5 November 2022
- Tries scored: 1501 (average 8.3 per match)
- Top point scorer: 187 – Charlie Carter (Hornets)
- Top try scorer: 19 – Devon Constant (Leicester Lions)

The 2022–23 National League 2 West was the first season of the fourth-tier (west) of the English domestic rugby union competitions; one of three at this level. The others are National League 2 North and National League 2 East. Previously, there were two leagues at level four; National League 2 North and National League 2 South. The champions are promoted to National League 1. The bottom two teams are relegated to Regional 1 Midlands or Regional 1 South West depending on location.

Leicester Lions became champions, with three matches to play, following their 33 – 5 win over Loughborough Students on 25 March 2023. Barnstaple (13th place) and Stourbridge (14th) are relegated to Regional 1 South West and Regional 1 Midlands respectively.

== Structure ==
The league consists of fourteen teams who play the others on a home and away basis, to make a total of 26 matches each. The champions are promoted to National League 1. The bottom two teams are relegated to Regional 1 Midlands or Regional 1 South West.

The results of the matches contribute points to the league as follows:

- 4 points are awarded for a win
- 2 points are awarded for a draw
- 0 points are awarded for a loss, however
- 1 losing (bonus) point is awarded to a team that loses a match by 7 points or fewer
- 1 additional (bonus) point is awarded to a team scoring 4 tries or more in a match.

=== Participating teams and locations ===
Locations of the 2022–23 National League 2 West teams

Team	Ground	Capacity	City/Area	Previous season
Barnstaple	Pottingham Road	2,000 (575 seats)	Barnstaple, Devon	Transferred from National 2 South 16th
Bournville	Avery Fields		Edgbaston, Birmingham, West Midlands	Transferred from National 2 North 13th
Clifton	Station Road	2,200 (200 seats)	Cribbs Causeway, Patchway, Bristol	Transferred from National 2 South 3rd
Dings Crusaders	Shaftesbury Park	2,250 (250 seats)	Frenchay, Bristol	Transferred from National 2 South 7th
Exeter University	Topsham Sports Ground		Exeter, Devon	Promoted from South West Premier 1st
Hinckley	De Montfort Park	2,000	Hinckley, Leicestershire	Transferred from National 2 South 13th
Hornets	The Nest, Hutton Moor Park	1,100 (100 stand)	Weston-super-Mare, Somerset	Promoted from South West Premier 2nd
Leicester Lions	Westleigh Park	2,000	Blaby, Leicestershire	Transferred from National 2 South 5th
Loughborough Students	East Park (Note: Since relegation from the 2018–19 National League 1 Loughborough Students have switched games from the Loughborough University Stadium to nearby East Park.)	1,000	Loughborough, Leicestershire	Transferred from National 2 North 10th
Luctonians	Mortimer Park	2,500 (300 seats)	Kingsland, Herefordshire	Transferred from National 2 North 8th
Newport (Salop)	The Old Showground		Newport, Shropshire	Promoted from Midlands Premier 1st
Old Redcliffians	Scotland Lane	1,000	Brislington, Bristol	Promoted from South West Premier 3rd
Redruth	Recreation Ground	3,500 (580 seats)	Redruth, Cornwall	Transferred from National 2 South 2nd
Stourbridge	Stourton Park	3,500 (499 seats)	Stourbridge, West Midlands	Transferred from National 2 North 4th

== League table ==
2022–23 National League 2 West table
Pos	Team	Pld	W	D	L	PF	PA	PD	TB	LB	Pts	Qualification
1	Leicester Lions (C, P)	26	25	0	1	846	397	+449	21	1	122	Promoted
2	Dings Crusaders	26	20	0	6	882	658	+224	20	4	104	
3	Clifton	26	19	0	7	932	571	+361	21	1	98	
4	Luctonians	26	17	0	9	771	474	+297	18	4	90	
5	Hinckley	26	15	2	9	724	736	−12	18	2	84	
6	Loughborough Students	26	13	3	10	849	808	+41	19	6	83	
7	Redruth	26	14	0	12	773	656	+117	15	4	75	
8	Old Redcliffians	26	13	1	12	704	738	−34	14	4	72	
9	Exeter University	25	13	1	11	713	711	+2	14	4	72	
10	Newport (Salop)	26	7	0	19	595	951	−356	16	6	50	
11	Bournville	25	6	1	18	627	890	−263	13	7	46	
12	Hornets	26	6	0	20	662	829	−167	13	9	46	
13	Barnstaple (R)	26	6	0	20	471	755	−284	7	5	36	Relegated
14	Stourbridge (R)	26	3	0	23	604	979	−375	14	5	26 (Note: Stourbridge were deducted 5 points)	Relegated

Updated to match(es) played on 29 April 2023. Source:
Rules for classification: If teams are level at any stage, tiebreakers are applied in the following order:
1. Number of matches won
2. Difference between points for and against
3. Total number of points for
4. Aggregate number of points scored in matches between tied teams
5. Number of matches won excluding the first match, then the second and so on until the tie is settled
  (C) Champion; (P) Promoted; (R) Relegated
  Notes:

== Fixtures & results ==
Fixtures for the season were announced by the RFU on 13 June 2022.

=== Round 1 ===
3 September 2022
14:00

(1 BP) Leicester Lions	28 – 17	Hornets

Westleigh Park
Attendance: 129
Referee: Neil Sweeney

3 September 2022
14:30

Barnstaple	23 – 31	Exeter University (1 BP)

Pottingham Road
Attendance: 298
Referee: Tom Evans-Jones

3 September 2022
14:30

(1 BP) Bournville	19 – 20	Hinckley

Avery Fields
Attendance: 150
Referee: Callum Watson

3 September 2022
15:00

(1 BP) Clifton	31 – 28	Loughborough Students (2 BP)

Station Road
Attendance: 510
Referee: Lloyd Davies

3 September 2022
15:00

(1 BP) Dings Crusaders	29 – 17	Luctonians

Shaftesbury Park
Attendance: 329
Referee: Dan Parrott

3 September 2022
15:00

(1 BP) Old Redcliffians	58 – 14	Newport (Salop)

Scotland Lane
Attendance: 330
Referee: Philip Russell

3 September 2022
15:00

(1 BP) Redruth	41 – 8	Stourbridge

Recreation Ground
Attendance: 645
Referee: Ben Wood

=== Round 2 ===
10 September 2022
14:00

(1 BP) Exeter University	42 – 29	Redruth (1 BP)

Topsham Sports Ground
Attendance: 424
Referee: James Milliner-Woodcock

10 September 2022
14:15

(1 BP) Newport (Salop)	35 – 28	Bournville (2 BP)

The Old Showground
Attendance: 400
Referee: Benjamin Wood

10 September 2022
14:30

(1 BP) Hornets	22 – 23	Barnstaple

The Nest
Attendance: Not recorded
Referee: Callum Watson

10 September 2022
15:00

(1 BP) Dings Crusaders	43 – 24	Clifton

Shaftesbury Park
Attendance: 475
Referee: Max Weston

10 September 2022
15:00

Hinckley	15 – 26	Leicester Lions (1 BP)

De Montfort Park
Attendance: 500
Referee: Jamie Parr

10 September 2022
15:00

(1 BP) Luctonians	44 – 15	Old Redcliffians

Mortimer Park
Attendance: 568
Referee: Neil Sweeney

10 September 2022
15:00

Stourbridge	25 – 54	Loughborough Students(1 BP)

Stourton Park
Attendance: 445
Referee: James Dowds

=== Round 3 ===
17 September 2022
14:00

(1 BP) Leicester Lions	48 – 19	Newport (Salop)

Westleigh Park
Attendance: 122
Referee: Jack Sutton

17 September 2022
14:00

Loughborough Students	17 – 37	Exeter University (1 BP)

Loughborough University Stadium
Attendance: 267
Referee: Benjamin Wood

17 September 2022
14:30

Barnstaple	17 – 45	Hinckley (1 BP)

Pottingham Road
Attendance: 350
Referee: Lloyd Davies

17 September 2022
14:30

Bournville	3 – 18	Luctonians

Avery Fields
Attendance: 400
Referee: Neil Sweeney

17 September 2022
14:30

(1 BP) Clifton	59 – 19	Stourbridge

Station Road
Attendance: 221
Referee: Callum Watson

17 September 2022
15:00

(2 BP) Old Redcliffians	29 – 32	Dings Crusaders (1 BP)

Scotland Lane
Attendance: 350
Referee: James Milliner-Woodcock

17 September 2022
15:00

(1 BP) Redruth	41 – 31	Hornets (1 BP)

Recreation Ground
Attendance: 652
Referee: Max Weston

=== Round 4 ===
24 September 2022
14:00

(1 BP) Exeter University	45 – 24	Stourbridge (1 BP)

Topsham Sports Ground
Attendance: 134
Referee: Lloyd Davies

24 September 2022
14:15

(1 BP) Newport (Salop)	25 – 18	Barnstaple (1 BP)

The Old Showground
Attendance: 350
Referee: Adam Carpenter

24 September 2022
14:30

(1 BP) Hornets	40 – 38	Loughborough Students (2 BP)

The Nest
Attendance: 202
Referee: David Myers

24 September 2022
15:00

(1 BP) Dings Crusaders	45 – 41	Bournville (2 BP)

Shaftesbury Park
Attendance: 236
Referee: Neil Sweeney

24 September 2022
15:00

(1 BP) Hinckley	31 – 25	Redruth

De Montfort Park
Attendance: 350
Referee: James Dowds

24 September 2022
15:00

(2 BP) Luctonians	37 – 43	Leicester Lions (1 BP)

Mortimer Park
Attendance: 638
Referee: Callum Watson

24 September 2022
15:00

Old Redcliffians	3 – 41	Clifton (1 BP)

Scotland Lane
Attendance: 174
Referee: Dan Parrott

=== Round 5 ===
1 October 2022
14:00

(1 BP) Leicester Lions	15 – 19	Dings Crusaders

Westleigh Park
Attendance: 152
Referee: Benjamin Wood

1 October 2022
14:00

(1 BP) Loughborough Students	35 – 35	Hinckley (1 BP)

Loughborough University Stadium
Attendance: 458
Referee: Neil Sweeney

1 October 2022
14:30

Barnstaple	6 – 31	Luctonians (1 BP)

Pottingham Road
Attendance: 400
Referee: James Milliner-Wood

1 October 2022
14:30

(1 BP) Bournville	20 – 24	O Redcliffians (1 BP)

Avery Fields
Attendance: 280
Referee: Lloyd Davies

1 October 2022
14:30

(1 BP) Clifton	48 – 14	Exeter University

Station Road
Attendance: 254
Referee: Tom Evans-Jones

1 October 2022
14:30

(1 BP) Redruth	95 – 7	Newport (Salop)

Recreation Ground
Attendance: 752
Referee: Callum Watson

1 October 2022
15:00

(1 BP) Stourbridge	55 – 25	Hornets (1 BP)

Stourton Park
Attendance: 455
Referee: Max Weston

=== Round 6 ===
15 October 2022
14:15

(2 BP) Newport (Salop)	22 – 24	Loughborough Students (1 BP)

The Old Showground
Attendance: 350
Referee: Max Weston

15 October 2022
14:30

(1 BP) Bournville	28 – 57	Clifton (1 BP)

Avery Fields
Attendance: 300
Referee: Benjamin Wood

15 October 2022
14:30

(1 BP) Hornets	40 – 48	Exeter University (1 BP)

The Nest
Attendance: 200
Referee: Dan Parrott

15 October 2022
15:00

(1 BP) Dings Crusaders	52 – 10	Barnstaple

Shaftesbury Park
Attendance: 318
Referee: Neil Sweeney

15 October 2022
15:00

(1 BP) Hinckley	40 – 24	Stourbridge (1 BP)

De Montfort Park
Attendance: 300
Referee: Tom Evan-Jones

15 October 2022
15:00

Luctonians	22 – 33	Redruth (1 BP)

Mortimer Park
Attendance: 478
Referee: James Dowds

15 October 2022
15:00

Old Redcliffians	19 – 45	Leicester Lions (1 BP)

Scotland Lane
Attendance: 179
Referee: James Milner-Woodcock

=== Round 7 ===
22 October 2022
14:00

(2 BP) Exeter University	26 – 29	Hinckley (1 BP)

Topsham Sports Ground
Attendance: 198
Referee: Callum Watson

22 October 2022
14:00

(1 BP) Leicester Lions	57 – 14	Bournville

Westleigh Park
Attendance: 229
Referee: Neil Sweeney

22 October 2022
14:00

Loughborough Students	27 – 24	Luctonians (2 BP)

Loughborough University Stadium
Attendance: 254
Referee: Ben Rayner

22 October 2022
14:30

(1 BP) Barnstaple	14 – 20	Old Redcliffians

Pottingham Road
Attendance: 325
Referee: James Milliner-Wood

22 October 2022
14:30

(1 BP) Clifton	63 – 17	Hornets

Station Road
Attendance: 302
Referee: Jamie Parr

22 October 2022
14:30

(1 BP) Redruth	49 – 19	Dings Crusaders

Recreation Ground
Attendance: 852
Referee: Max Weston

22 October 2022
15:00

(1 BP) Stourbridge	27 – 37	Newport (Salop) (1 BP)

Stourton Park
Attendance: 267
Referee: Lloyd Davies

=== Round 8 ===
29 October 2022
14:00

(1 BP) Leicester Lions	27 – 14	Clifton

Westleigh Park
Attendance: 179
Referee: Max Weston

29 October 2022
14:15

(1 BP) Newport (Salop)	22 – 50	Exeter University (1 BP)

The Old Showground
Attendance: 350
Referee: Benjamin Wood

29 October 2022
14:30

Bournville	14 – 37	Barnstaple (1 BP)

Avery Fields
Attendance: 350
Referee: Callum Watson

29 October 2022
15:00

(1 BP) Dings Crusaders	48 – 24	Loughborough Students (1 BP)

Shaftesbury Park
Attendance: 320
Referee: Dan Parrott

29 October 2022
15:00

(1 BP) Hinckley	24 – 19	Hornets (1 BP)

De Montfort Park
Attendance: 450
Referee: Lloyd Davies

29 October 2022
15:00

(1 BP) Luctonians	36 – 19	Stourbridge

Mortimer Park
Attendance: 458
Referee: Connor Boyle

29 October 2022
15:00

Old Redcliffians	14 – 26	Redruth (1 BP)

Scotland Lane
Attendance: 189
Referee: Tom Evans-Jones

=== Round 9 ===
5 November 2022
14:00

Barnstaple	10 – 26	Leicester Lions (1 BP)

Pottingham Road
Attendance: 175
Referee: Neil Sweeney

5 November 2022
14:00

Exeter University	3 – 33	Luctonians (1 BP)

Topsham Sports Ground
Attendance: 84
Referee: Lloyd Davies

5 November 2022
14:00

(1 BP) Loughborough Students	57 – 30	Old Redcliffians (1 BP)

Loughborough University Stadium
Attendance: 490
Referee: Alex Rose

5 November 2022
14:00

(1 BP) Redruth	36 – 17	Bournville

Recreation Ground
Attendance: 746
Referee: Benjamin Wood

5 November 2022
14:30

(1 BP) Clifton	34 – 13	Hinckley

Station Road
Attendance: 157
Referee: Gavin Jones

5 November 2022
14:30

(1 BP) Hornets	33 – 19	Newport (Salop)

The Nest
Attendance: 203
Referee: Max Weston

5 November 2022
15:00

(2 BP) Stourbridge	24 – 29	Dings Crusaders (1 BP)

Stourton Park
Attendance: 365
Referee: Callum Watson

=== Round 10 ===
12 November 2022
14:00

Barnstaple	3 – 29	Clifton (1 BP)

Pottingham Road
Attendance: 312
Referee: Benjamin Wood

12 November 2022
14:00

(1 BP) Leicester Lions	31 – 15	Redruth

Westleigh Park
Attendance: 165
Referee: Gavin Jones

12 November 2022
14:00

(1 BP) Old Redcliffians	50 – 27	Stourbridge (1 BP)

Scotland Lane
Attendance: Not recorded
Referee: James Milliner-Wood

12 November 2022
14:15

(1 BP) Luctonians	40 – 15	Hornets

Mortimer Park
Attendance: 497
Referee: Max Weston

12 November 2022
14:15

(2 BP) Newport (Salop)	29 – 33	Hinckley (1 BP)

The Old Showground
Attendance: 360
Referee: Dan Parrott

12 November 2022
14:30

(1 BP) Bournville	38 – 38	Loughborough Students (1 BP)

Avery Fields
Attendance: 350
Referee: Haydn Davies

12 November 2022
15:00

(1 BP) Dings Crusaders	12 – 19	Exeter University

Shaftesbury Park
Attendance: 307
Referee: Neil Sweeney

=== Round 11 ===
26 November 2022
14:00

Exeter University	P – P	Old Redcliffians

Topsham Sports Ground

26 November 2022
14:00

(2 BP) Loughborough Students	28 – 34	Leicester Lions (1 BP)

Loughborough University Stadium
Attendance: 573
Referee: Chris Sutton

26 November 2022
14:00

(1 BP) Redruth	31 – 0	Barnstaple

Recreation Ground
Attendance: 764
Referee: Max Weston

26 November 2022
14:30

(1 BP) Clifton	55 – 0	Newport (Salop)

Station Road
Attendance: 167
Referee: Peter Connor

26 November 2022
14:30

(2 BP) Hornets	26 – 31	Dings Crusaders (1 BP)

The Nest
Attendance: 342
Referee: James Milliner-Woodcock

26 November 2022
15:00

Hinckley	24 – 20	Luctonians (1 BP)

De Montfort Park
Attendance: 350
Referee: Callum Watson

26 November 2022
15:00

(2 BP) Stourbridge	29 – 34	Bournville (1 BP)

Stourton Park
Attendance: 465
Referee: Peter Caunt

=== Round 12 ===
3 December 2022
14:00

(1 BP) Barnstaple	36 – 33	Loughborough Students (2 BP)

Pottingham Road
Attendance: 310
Referee: James Milliner-Wood

3 December 2022
14:00

Leicester Lions	C – C (Note: Game cancelled as Stourbridge could not raise a team. Reverse fixture on 1st April 2023 switched from Stourton park to Westleigh Park.)	Stourbridge

Westleigh Park

3 December 2022
14:00

(1 BP) Old Redcliffians	30 – 25	Hornets (2 BP)

Scotland Lane
Attendance: 145
Referee: Haydn Davies

3 December 2022
14:00

Redruth	18 – 44	Clifton (1 BP)

Recreation Ground
Attendance: 682
Referee: Tom Evan-Jones

3 December 2022
14:15

Luctonians	27 – 5	Newport (Salop)

Mortimer Park
Attendance: 588
Referee: Peter Caunt

3 December 2022
14:30

(1 BP) Bournville	36 – 52	Exeter University (1 BP)

Avery Fields
Attendance: 300
Referee: Dan Parrott

3 December 2022
15:00

Dings Crusaders	20 – 31	Hinckley (1 BP)

Shaftesbury Park
Attendance: 346
Referee: Iain Kiy

=== Round 13 ===
10 December 2022
14:00

Exeter University	19 – 31	Leicester Lions (1 BP)

Topsham Sports Ground
Attendance: 153
Referee: James Milliner-Wood

10 December 2022
14:00

(2 BP) Loughborough Students	32 – 33	Redruth (1 BP)

Loughborough University Stadium
Attendance: 575
Referee: Ben Simpson

10 December 2022
14:15

Newport (Salop)	P – P	Dings Crusaders

The Old Showground

10 December 2022
14:30

Clifton	7 – 41	Luctonians (1 BP)

Station Road
Attendance: 198
Referee: James Andrew Dowds

10 December 2022
14:30

Hornets	17 – 10	Bournville (1 BP)

The Nest
Attendance: 175
Referee: Lloyd Davies

10 December 2022
15:00

Hinckley	P – P	Old Redcliffians

De Montfort Park

10 December 2022
15:00

Stourbridge	15 – 31	Barnstaple

Stourton Park
Attendance: 235
Referee: Peter Connor

=== Round 14 ===
17 December 2022
14:00

Barnstaple	P – P	Hornets

Pottingham Road

17 December 2022
14:00

Leicester Lions	P – P	Hinckley

Westleigh Park

17 December 2022
14:00

(1 BP) Loughborough Students	34 – 21	Stourbridge

Loughborough University Stadium
Attendance: 180
Referee: Holly Wood

17 December 2022
14:00

Old Redcliffians	P – P	Luctonians

Scotland Lane

17 December 2022
14:00

Redruth	P – P	Exeter University

Recreation Ground

17 December 2022
14:30

Bournville	22 – 12	Newport (Salop)

Avery Fields
Attendance: 300
Referee: Peter Connor

17 December 2022
14:30

Clifton	P – P	Dings Crusaders

Station Road

=== Round 15 ===
7 January 2023
14:00

Exeter University	17 – 15	Loughborough Students (1 BP)

Topsham Sports Ground
Attendance: 250
Referee: Tom Evans-Jones

7 January 2023
14:15

(1 BP) Luctonians	52 – 0	Bournville

Mortimer Park
Attendance: 679
Referee: Ben Wood

7 January 2023
14:15

(2 BP) Newport (Salop)	32 – 38	Leicester Lions (1 BP)

The Old Showground
Attendance: 350
Referee: Lloyd Davies

7 January 2023
14:30

Hornets	27 – 38	Redruth (1 BP)

The Nest
Attendance: 258
Referee: Dan Parrott

7 January 2023
15:00

(1 BP) Dings Crusaders	30 – 27	Old Redcliffians (2 BP)

Shaftesbury Park
Attendance: 430
Referee: James Millner-Wood

7 January 2023
15:00

(1 BP) Hinckley	38 – 5	Barnstaple

De Montfort Park
Attendance: 450
Referee: Neil Sweeney

7 January 2023
15:00

Stourbridge	12 – 27	Clifton (1 BP)

Stourton Park
Attendance: 310
Referee: Nathan Howarth

=== Round 16 ===
14 January 2023
14:00

(1 BP) Barnstaple	29 – 3	Newport (Salop)

Pottington Road
Attendance: 200
Referee: James Millner-Wood

14 January 2023
14:00

Leicester Lions	23 – 3	Luctonians

Westleigh Park
Attendance: 160
Referee: Philip Russell

14 January 2023
14:00

Loughborough Students	24 – 17	Hornets (1 BP)

Loughborough University Stadium
Attendance: 400
Referee: Peter Connor

14 January 2023
14:00

(1 BP) Redruth	24 – 5	Hinckley

Recreation Ground
Attendance: 829
Referee: Ben Wood

14 January 2023
14:30

(1 BP) Bournville	29 – 41	Dings Crusaders (1 BP)

Avery Fields
Attendance: 350
Referee: Lloyd Davies

14 January 2023
14:30

(1 BP) Clifton	24 – 15	Old Redcliffians

Station Road
Attendance: 321
Referee: Ben Simpson

14 January 2023
15:00

Stourbridge	15 – 59	Exeter University (1 BP)

Stourton Park
Attendance: 319
Referee: James Dowds

=== Round 17 ===
21 January 2023
14:00

Exeter University	19 – 35	Clifton (1 BP)

Topsham Sports Ground
Attendance: 167
Referee: Dan Parrott

21 January 2023
14:00

Old Redcliffians	P – P	Bournville

Scotland Lane

21 January 2023
14:15

Lutonians	P – P	Barnstaple

Mortimer Park

21 January 2023
14:15

Newport (Salop)	P – P	Redruth

The Old Showground

21 January 2023
14:30

(1 BP) Hornets	47 – 26	Stourbridge (1 BP)

The Nest
Attendance: 600
Referee: Haydn Davies

21 January 2023
15:00

(2 BP) Dings Crusaders	24 – 27	Leicester Lions

Shaftesbury Park
Attendance: 285
Referee: Max Weston

21 January 2023
15:00

Hinckley	P – P	Loughborough Students

De Montfort Park

=== Round 18 ===
28 January 2023
14:00

Barnstaple	19 – 31	Dings Crusaders (1 BP)

Pottingham Road
Attendance: 350
Referee: Dan Parrott

28 January 2023
14:00

(1 BP) Exeter University	29 – 19	Hornets

Topsham Sports Ground
Attendance: 300
Referee: James Milliner-Wood

28 January 2023
14:00

(1 BP) Leicester Lions	36 – 14	Old Redcliffians

Westleigh Park
Attendance: 138
Referee: Peter Connor

28 January 2023
14:00

(1 BP) Loughborough Students	45 – 31	Newport (Salop) (1 BP)

Loughborough University Stadium
Attendance: Not recorded
Referee: Conor Boyle

28 January 2023
14:00

Redruth	21 – 3	Luctonians

Recreation Ground
Attendance: 726
Referee: Neil Sweeney

28 January 2023
14:30

(1 BP) Clifton	64 – 40	Bournville (1 BP)

Station Road
Attendance: 241
Referee: Iain Kly

28 January 2023
15:00

(1 BP) Stourbridge	28 – 52	Hinckley (1 BP)

Stourton Park
Attendance: 395
Referee: Max Weston

=== Rescheduled matches ===
4 February 2023
14:00

Barnstaple	12 – 24	Hornets (1 BP)

Pottingham Road
Attendance: 650
Referee: James Milliner-Wood

4 February 2023
14:00

Exeter University	20 – 30	Old Redcliffians

Topsham Sports Ground
Attendance: 112
Referee: Haydn Davies

4 February 2023
14:00

(1 BP) Leicester Lions	47 – 7	Hinckley

Westleigh Park
Attendance: 427
Referee: Callum Watson

4 February 2023
14:15

(1 BP) Newport (Salop)	32 – 26	Dings Crusaders (2 BP)

The Old Showground
Attendance: 300
Referee: Henry Pearson

=== Rescheduled matches ===
11 February 2023
14:00

(1 BP) Redruth	26 – 20	Exeter University (1 BP)

Recreation Ground
Attendance: 649
Referee: Callum Watson

11 February 2023
14:15

(1 BP) Luctonians	45 – 17	Barnstaple

Mortimer Park
Attendance: 348
Referee: Simon Waite

11 February 2023
14:30

(2 BP) Clifton	26 – 27	Dings Crusaders

Station Road
Attendance: 402
Referee: Haydn Davies

11 February 2023
15:00

(1 BP) Hinckley	35 – 5	Old Redcliffians

De Montfort Park
Attendance: 400
Referee: Jack Moorhouse

=== Round 19 ===
18 February 2023
14:00

(1 BP) Old Redcliffians	36 – 31	Barnstaple (2 BP)

Scotland Lane
Attendance: 170
Referee: Max Weston

18 February 2023
14:15

(1 BP) Luctonians	29 – 17	Loughborough Students

Mortimer Park
Attendance: 572
Referee: Lloyd Davies

18 February 2023
14:15

(1 BP) Newport (Salop)	31 – 24	Stourbridge (1 BP)

The Old Showground
Attendance: 300
Referee: Neil Sweeney

18 February 2023
14:30

Bournville	7 – 26	Leicester Lions (1 BP)

Avery Fields
Attendance: 202
Referee: Tom Evans-Jones

18 February 2023
14:30

(1 BP) Hornets	19 – 24	Clifton (1 BP)

The Nest
Attendance: 386
Referee: James Milliner-Wood

18 February 2023
15:00

(1 BP) Dings Crusaders	50 – 19	Redruth

Shaftesbury Park
Attendance: 322
Referee: Benjamin Wood

18 February 2023
15:00

(1 BP) Hinckley	22 – 19	Exeter University (1 BP)

De Montfort Park
Attendance: 350
Referee: Dan Parrott

=== Round 20 ===
25 February 2023
14:00

(1 BP) Barnstaple	13 – 17	Bournville

Pottingham Road
Attendance: 462
Referee: Haydn Davies

25 February 2023
14:00

(1 BP) Exeter University	31 – 28	Newport (Salop) (2 BP)

Topsham Sports Ground
Attendance: 134
Referee: James Dowds

25 February 2023
14:00

(1 BP) Loughborough Students	47 – 45	Dings Crusaders (2 BP)

Loughborough University Stadium
Attendance: 200
Referee: Dan Parrott

25 February 2023
14:30

Clifton	14 – 24	Leicester Lions

Station Road
Attendance: 300
Referee: Ben Wood

25 February 2023
14:30

(1 BP) Hornets	46 – 41	Hinckley (2 BP)

The Nest
Attendance: 200
Referee: Nathan Howarth

25 February 2023
14:30

(1 BP) Redruth	13 – 14	Old Redcliffians

Recreation Ground
Attendance: 658
Referee: James Milliner-Wood

25 February 2023
15:00

(1 BP) Stourbridge	10 – 17	Luctonians

Stourton Park
Attendance: 325
Referee: Peter Connor

=== Round 21 ===
4 March 2023
14:00

(1 BP) Bournville	50 – 42	Redruth (1 BP)

Avery Fields
Attendance: 202
Referee: Dan Parrott

4 March 2023
14:00

(1 BP) Leicester Lions	40 – 12	Barnstaple

Westleigh Park
Attendance: 242
Referee: Neil Sweeney

4 March 2023
14:00

(2 BP) Old Redcliffians	32 – 36	Loughborough Students (1 BP)

Scotland Lane
Attendance: 182
Referee: Tom Evans-Jones

4 March 2023
14:15

(1 BP) Newport (Salop)	34 – 19	Hornets

The Old Showground
Attendance: 225
Referee: Peter Connor

4 March 2023
15:00

(1 BP) Dings Crusaders	52 – 12	Stourbridge

Shaftesbury Park
Attendance: 308
Referee: James Millner-Woodcock

4 March 2023
15:00

(1 BP) Hinckley	31 – 71	Clifton(1 BP)

De Montfort Park
Attendance: 400
Referee: Max Weston

4 March 2023
15:00

(1 BP) Luctonians	59 – 28	Exeter University (1 BP)

Mortimer Park
Attendance: 486
Referee: Ben Wood

=== Round 22 ===
11 March 2023
14:00

Exeter University	22 – 28	Dings Crusaders (1 BP)

Topsham Sports Ground
Attendance: 128
Referee: Neil Sweeney

11 March 2023
14:00

(1 BP) Loughborough Students	39 – 36	Bournville (2 BP)

Loughborough University Stadium
Attendance: 515
Referee: Benjamin Wood

11 March 2023
14:00

Redruth	7 – 33	Leicester Lions (1 BP)

Recreation Ground
Attendance: 524
Referee: Callum Watson

11 March 2023
14:30

(1 BP) Clifton	26 – 3	Barnstaple

Station Road
Attendance: 150
Referee: James Milliner-Woodcock

11 March 2023
14:30

Hornets	14 – 26	Luctonians (1 BP)

The Nest
Attendance: 315
Referee: Conor Boyle

11 March 2023
15:00

(1 BP) Hinckley	36 – 12	Newport (Salop)

De Montfort Park
Attendance: 350
Referee: Peter Caunt

11 March 2023
15:00

Stourbridge	19 – 15	Old Redcliffians (1 BP)

Stourton Park
Attendance: 220
Referee: Peter Connor

=== Rescheduled matches ===
18 March 2023
14:00

(1 BP) Old Redcliffians	28 – 25	Luctonians (2 BP)

Scotland Lane
Attendance: 250
Referee: Dan Parrott

18 March 2023
14:15

(1 BP) Newport (Salop)	43 – 24	Redruth (1 BP)

The Old Showground
Attendance: 200
Referee: Tom Evans-Jones

18 March 2023
15:00

(1 BP) Hinckley	28 – 28	Loughborough Students

De Montfort Park
Attendance: 400
Referee: Callum Watson

=== Round 23 ===
25 March 2023
14:00

(1 BP) Leicester Lions	33 – 5	Loughborough Students

Westleigh Park
Attendance: 425
Referee: Max Weston

25 March 2023
14:00

(1 BP) Old Redcliffians	24 – 24	Exeter University (1 BP)

Scotland Lane
Attendance: 325
Referee: Callum Watson

25 March 2023
14:30

(1 BP) Barnstaple	12 – 18	Redruth

Pottingham Road
Attendance: 385
Referee: Haydn Davies

25 March 2023
14:30

(1 BP) Bournville	34 – 33	Stourbridge (2 BP)

Avery Fields
Attendance: 550
Referee: Peter O'Connor

25 March 2023
15:00

(1 BP) Dings Crusaders	31 – 24	Hornets (1 BP)

Shaftesbury Park
Attendance: 302
Referee: James Millner Wood

25 March 2023
15:00

(1 BP) Luctonians	40 – 12	Hinckley

Mortimer Park
Attendance: 634
Referee: George Cursey

25 March 2023
15:00

(2 BP) Newport (Salop)	29 – 33	Clifton (1 BP)

The Old Showground
Attendance: 450
Referee: Dan Parrott

=== Round 24 ===
1 April 2023
14:00

Exeter University	P – P	Bournville

Topsham Sports Ground

1 April 2023
14:00

(1 BP) Loughborough Students	38 – 17	Barnstaple

Loughborough University Stadium
Attendance: 412
Referee: Woodhouse

1 April 2023
14:15

Newport (Salop)	15 – 27	Luctonians (1 BP)

The Old Showground
Attendance: 400
Referee: Haydn Davies

1 April 2023
14:30

Clifton	18 – 10	Redruth

Station Road
Attendance: 326
Referee: Max Weston

1 April 2023
15:00

(1 BP) Hinckley	17 – 20	Dings Crusaders

De Montfort Park
Attendance: 400
Referee: Tom Evans-Jones

1 April 2023
15:00

(1 BP) Leicester Lions	29 – 53	Stourbridge (1 BP)

Westleigh Park (Note: Originally this was a home fixture for Stourbridge but it was switched after the Leicester Lions v Stourbridge game on 3 December 2022 was cancelled after Stourbridge could not raise a team.)
Attendance: 127
Referee: Benjamin Wood

1 April 2023
15:15

(1 BP) Hornets	29 – 33	Old Redcliffians (1 BP)

The Nest
Attendance: 310
Referee: James Milliner-Wood

=== Round 25 ===
15 April 2023
14:00

(1 BP) Leicester Lions	40 – 5	Exeter University

Westleigh Park
Attendance: 155
Referee: Peter Connor

15 April 2023
14:00

(2 BP) Redruth	31 – 33	Loughborough Students (1 BP)

Recreation Ground
Attendance: 869
Referee: James Milliner-Woodcock

15 April 2023
14:30

(1 BP) Barnstaple	47 – 31	Stourbridge (1 BP)

Pottingham Road
Attendance: 635
Referee: Haydn Davies

15 April 2023
14:30

(1 BP) Bournville	46 – 38	Hornets (1 BP)

Avery Fields
Attendance: 250
Referee: Benjamin Wood

15 April 2023
15:00

(1 BP) Dings Crusaders	64 – 28	Newport (Salop) (1 BP)

Shaftesbury Park
Attendance: 402
Referee: Dan Parrott

15 April 2023
15:00

(1 BP) Luctonians	35 – 26	Clifton (1 BP)

Mortimer Park
Attendance: 589
Referee: Neil Sweeney

15 April 2023
15:00

(1 BP) Old Redcliffians	54 – 26	Hinckley (1 BP)

Scotland Lane
Attendance: 205
Referee: James Dowds

=== Round 26 ===
22 April 2023
15:00

(1 BP) Exeter University	34 – 26	Barnstaple (1 BP)

Topsham Sports Ground
Attendance: 310
Referee: Neil Sweeney

22 April 2023
15:00

(1 BP) Hinckley	34 – 28	Bournville (2BP)

De Montfort Park
Attendance: 500
Referee: Haydn Davies

22 April 2023
15:00

(1 BP) Hornets	12 – 15	Leicester Lions

The Nest
Attendance: 750
Referee: James Milliner-Wood

22 April 2023
15:00

(1 BP) Loughborough Students	53 – 38	Clifton (1 BP)

Loughborough University Stadium
Attendance: 398
Referee: Tom Evan-Jones

22 April 2023
15:00

(1 BP) Luctonians	20 – 34	Dings Crusaders (1 BP)

Mortimer Park
Attendance: 527
Referee: James Dowd

22 April 2023
15:00

(2 BP) Newport (Salop)	31 – 37	Old Redcliffians (1 BP)

The Old Showground
Attendance: 450
Referee: Peter Connor

22 April 2023
15:00

(1 BP) Stourbridge	48 – 28	Redruth (1 BP)

Stourton Park
Attendance: 695
Referee: George Ounsley

=== Rescheduled match ===
29 April 2023
15:00

(1 BP) Old Redcliffians	33 – 14	Bournville

Scotland Lane
Attendance: 226
Referee: James Dowds

=== Rescheduled match ===
6 May 2023
15:00

Exeter University	C – C	Bournville

Topsham Sports Ground

== Attendances ==
Club	Home games	Total	Average	Highest	Lowest	% Capacity
Barnstaple	13	4,852	373	650	175	19%
Bournville	13	3,984	306	550	150	N/A
Clifton	13	3,549	273	510	150	12%
Dings Crusaders	13	4,380	337	475	236	15%
Exeter University	12 (Note: Exeter University only played 12 home games as their fixture versus Bournville on 6 May 2023 was cancelled.)	2,394	200	424	84	N/A
Hinckley	13	5,200	400	500	300	20%
Hornets	12 (Note: There was no record of the attendance for Hornets home game versus Barnstaple on 10 September 2022.)	3,941	328	750	175	30%
Leicester Lions	13	2,650	204	427	122	10%
Loughborough Students	12 (Note: There was no record of the attendance for Loughborough Students home game versus Newport (Salop) on 28 January 2023.)	4,722	394	575	180	39%
Luctonians	13	7,062	543	679	348	22%
Newport (Salop)	13	4,485	345	450	200	N/A
Old Redcliffians	12 (Note: There was no record of the attendance for Old Redcliffians home game versus Stourbridge on 12 November 2022.)	2,725	227	350	145	23%
Redruth	13	9,348	719	869	524	21%
Stourbridge	12 (Note: Stourbridge only played 12 home games as their home game on 1 April 2023 against Leicester Lions was switched to Westleigh Park after the first league game between the sides on 3 December 2022 was cancelled due to Stourbridge being unable to raise a team.)	4,496	375	695	220	11%

== Individual statistics ==
=== Top points scorers ===
Rank	Player	Team	Points
1	Charlie Carter	Hornets	187
2	Benjamin Young	Leicester Lions	186
3	Ashley Groves	Old Redcliffians	179
4	Fraser Honey	Redruth	165
5	Luke Cozens	Clifton	158
6	Max Craven	Bournville	155
7	Ciaran Donoghue	Dings Crusaders	147
7	Louis Silver	Luctonians	147
9	Thomas Smith	Loughborough Students	141

=== Top try scorers ===
Rank	Player	Team	Tries
1	Devon Constant	Leicester Lions	19
2	Richard Brown	Redruth	18
2	Ben Link	Luctonians	18
3	Jack Lea	Stourbridge	16
4	Alexander Howman	Clifton	15
4	William Owen	Clifton	15
5	Bradley Talbot	Clifton	14
5	Solomon Taufa	Dings Crusaders	14
6	James Stubbs	Leicester Lions	13

== See also ==
- 2022–23 National League 1
- 2022–23 National League 2 North
- 2022–23 National League 2 East
