= Hull RUFC =

English rugby union club, based in Kingston upon Hull

(England) Hull
- Full name: Hull Rugby Football Club
- Union: Yorkshire RFU
- Founded: 1992; 34 years ago
- Location: Kingston upon Hull, East Riding of Yorkshire, England
- Ground: LTS Leisure Ferens Ground (Capacity: 1,500 (288 seats))
- Chairman: David Piercy
- President: Jeremy Saunt
- Captain: Alexander Heard
- League: National League 2 North
- 2025–26: 14th (relegated to Regional 1 North East
Team kit

Official website
- hullrugbyunion.com

Hull Rugby Union Football Club is one of two rugby union clubs based in Hull in the East Riding of Yorkshire, England. They currently play in Regional 1 North East following their relegation from National League 2 North at the end of the 2025–26 season.

== History ==
The club was formed in 1992 as a result of two clubs – Old Hymerians RUFC and Hull & East Riding RUFC (1989). They initially played at the Old Hymerians ground at Haworth Park (capacity 1,200) until the 2008–09 season when they moved to their current home; the Ferens Ground located at Chanterlands Avenue. The club has progressed up the rugby union pyramid, beginning life in the old North East 2, and won promotion to National League 2 North in 2009. In 2009 a women's team was founded and the women and girls section is continuously growing.

In 2015, after six seasons in National League 2 North, Hull were relegated to the northern regional leagues. In 2019 the club won the North Premier (tier 5) league title for the first time, making a return to National League 2 North and in 2022 the club were champions of National League 2 North, winning promotion to National League 1. This was the first time the club had reached tier 3 of the English club game.

== Ground ==
The Ferens Ground is next to Hull Sports Centre, on Chanterlands Avenue, about 2.5 miles from Hull Paragon Interchange and the city centre, with parking available both in and around the ground. Capacity is around 1,500, most of which is standing but there is also seating for up to 288.

== Honours ==
- National League 2 North champions: 2021–22
- North Premier champions: 2018–19
- North 1 v Midlands 1 promotion play-off winner: 2008–09
- North Division 2 East champions: 2003–04
- Yorkshire 1 champions: 2001–02
- W S Fowler Challenge Trophy Sevens winners: 2005–06
- Yorkshire Cup winners: 2012, 2018

== Roll of honour ==
Presidents

- S. Saunt (1992–95)
- L. J. Sheppard DFC (1995–97)
- R. H. Gore (1997–99)
- A. B. Wilkie (1999–01)
- J. L. Beal (2001–03)
- M. A. Harness (2003–04)
- A. B. Wilkie (2004–05)
- R. C. Lewis (2005–07)
- G. Lound (2007–09)

Chairmen

- R. P. Ashton (1992–94)
- J. L. Beal (1994–96)
- M. A. Harness (1996–98)
- R. C. Lewis (1998–00)
- R. Gibbin (2000–02)
- G. Lound (2002–05)
- A. B. Wilkie (2005–08)

1st XV captains

- D. A. Walters (1992–93)
- W. P. Hazelton (1993–94)
- M. Lockton (1994–96)
- R. L. Beal (1996–97)
- J. M. Oxley (1997–98)
- R. L. Beal (1998–00)
- W. P. Hazelton (2000–01)
- L. McKenzie (2001–03)
- M. David (2003–04)
- G. C. Martinson (2004–05)
- J. D. Barkworth (2005–06)
- C. Kendra (2006–07)
- C. Murphy (2007–08)

== Notable players ==
- Phil Murphy
- Tevita Vaikona
- Motu Tony
- Maea David
- Neil Spence
- Thomas Minns

== Current standings ==
2025–26 National League 2 North table
Pos	Team	Pld	W	D	L	PF	PA	PD	TB	LB	Pts	Qualification
1	Sheffield (P)	26	24	0	2	1041	467	+574	24	1	121	Promotion place
2	Tynedale	26	21	0	5	941	509	+432	19	3	106	Promotion play-off
3	Macclesfield (R)	26	20	0	6	1037	725	+312	21	2	103	
4	Hull Ionians	26	17	1	8	801	592	+209	19	3	92	
5	Darlington Mowden Park	26	15	1	10	878	877	+1	20	2	84	
6	Fylde	26	13	3	10	796	664	+132	16	5	79	
7	Wharfedale	26	13	0	13	725	780	−55	15	6	73	
8	Sheffield Tigers	26	12	0	14	686	611	+75	15	8	71	
9	Preston Grasshoppers	26	10	1	15	776	817	−41	16	3	61	
10	Billingham	26	10	0	16	604	905	−301	16	3	59	
11	Otley	26	7	0	19	673	831	−158	12	8	48	
12	Rossendale (R)	26	7	0	19	633	965	−332	14	4	46	Relegation play-off
13	Scunthorpe (R)	26	5	0	21	622	1097	−475	12	7	39	Relegation place
14	Hull (R)	26	5	0	21	570	943	−373	11	5	36	Relegation place

Updated to match(es) played on 2 May 2026. Source: National League Rugby
Rules for classification: If teams are level at any stage, tiebreakers are applied in the following order:
1. Number of matches won
2. Number of matches drawn
3. Difference between points for and against
4. Total number of points for
5. Aggregate number of points scored in matches between tied teams
6. Number of matches won excluding the first match, then the second and so on until the tie is settled
