= Phil Murphy (rugby union, born 1980) =

English rugby union player

- Born: 1 April 1980 (age 46) Beverley, Humberside, England
- Height: 6 ft 5 in (1.96 m)
- Weight: 17 st 8 lb (112 kg)

Rugby union career
- Position: Lock
Senior career
Years	Team	Apps	(Points)
2003–	Leeds Tykes		
–	Wakefield RFC		

Phil Murphy (born 1 April 1980, Beverley, Humberside, England) is an English rugby union player for Leeds Tykes in the Guinness Premiership. Murphy plays as a lock.

He also played (on loan) for Wakefield RFC during the 2002/03 season.
