= 2021–22 National League 2 North =

Rugby union competition in England

- Countries: England
- Date: 4 September 2021 – 7 May 2022
- Champions: Hull (1st title)
- Runners-up: Sedgley Park
- Relegated: No relegation
- Matches played: 239
- Attendance: 79,054 (average 331 per match)
- Highest attendance: 1,106 – Fylde v Tynedale, 30 April 2022
- Lowest attendance: 50 – Harrogate v Rotherham Titans, 11 December 2021
- Tries scored: 1737 (average 7.3 per match)
- Top point scorer: 278– Gregory Smith (Fylde)
- Top try scorer: 36 – Matthew Gallagher (Sedgley Park)

The 2021–22 National League 2 North was the twelfth season (34th overall) of the fourth tier (north) of the English domestic rugby union competitions since the professionalised format of the second division was introduced.

Hull were crowned champions on 23 April 2022, when they played their last but one match of the season at home to local rivals Hull Ionians, beating them with a final minute try, 31–29 in front of a crowd of 950. Hull were promoted to National One for the 2022–23 seasom. Owing to the reorganisation of the national leagues, there was no play-off match and Sedgley Park continued to play at this level. Huddersfield (15th) and Harrogate (16th) also continued to play at this level, due to the increase of tier 4 leagues from two to three.

== Structure ==
The league consists of sixteen teams with all the teams playing each other on a home and away basis to make a total of thirty matches each. There is one promotion place and owing to the reorganisation of tier three and four divisions, there is no relegation. The champions are promoted to National League 1.

The results of the matches contribute points to the league as follows:

- 4 points are awarded for a win
- 2 points are awarded for a draw
- 0 points are awarded for a loss, however
- 1 losing (bonus) point is awarded to a team that loses a match by 7 points or fewer
- 1 additional (bonus) point is awarded to a team scoring 4 tries or more in a match.

=== Participating teams and locations ===
Locations of the 2021–22 National League 2 North teams

Eleven of the teams listed below participated in the 2019–20 National League 2 North season. The 2019–20 champions, Caldy, were promoted to the 2021–22 National League 1, replacing Rotherham Titans and Hull Ionians who were relegated from the 2019–20 National League 1. The three teams relegated from National League 2 North the previous season were Otley and Preston Grasshoppers (both North Premier) and Scunthorpe (Midlands Premier).

The promoted teams were Bournville (champions of Midlands Premier), while Blaydon and Harrogate came up as champions and runner-up of North Premier. In order to address an imbalance of teams, Hinckley were level transferred to the 2021–22 National League 2 South as the most appropriately located team in terms of access to the southern sides.

Team	Ground	Capacity	City/Area	Previous season
Blaydon	Crow Trees	2,000 (400 seats)	Swalwell, Tyne and Wear	promoted from North Premier (1st)
Bournville	Avery Fields		Edgbaston, Birmingham, West Midlands	promoted from Midlands Premier (1st)
Chester	Hare Lane	2,000 (500 seats)	Chester, Cheshire	6th
Fylde	Woodlands Memorial Ground	7,500 (500 seats)	Lytham St. Annes, Lancashire	2nd
Harrogate	Rudding Lane	2,000	Harrogate, North Yorkshire	promoted from North Premier (2nd)
Huddersfield	Lockwood Park	1,500 (500 seats)	Huddersfield, West Yorkshire	12th
Hull	Ferens Ground	1,500 (288 seats)	Kingston upon Hull, East Riding	8th
Hull Ionians	Brantingham Park	1,500 (240 seats)	Brantingham, East Riding	relegated from National 1 (16th)
Loughborough Students	East Park (Note: Since relegation from the 2018–19 National League 1 Loughborough Students have switched games from the Loughborough University Stadium to nearby East Park.)	1,000	Loughborough, Leicestershire	5th
Luctonians	Mortimer Park	2,500 (300 seats)	Kingsland, Herefordshire	13th
Rotherham Titans	Clifton Lane	2,500	Rotherham, South Yorkshire	relegated from National 1 (14th)
Sedgley Park	Park Lane	3,000	Whitefield, Bury, Greater Manchester	4th
Sheffield Tigers	Dore Moor	1,000	Sheffield, South Yorkshire	10th
Stourbridge	Stourton Park	3,500 (499 seats)	Stourbridge, West Midlands	7th
Tynedale	Tynedale Park	2,000 (400 seats)	Corbridge, Northumberland	11th
Wharfedale	The Avenue	2,000	Threshfield, North Yorkshire	9th

== League table ==
2021–22 National League 2 North table
Pos	Team	Pld	W	D	L	PF	PA	PD	TB	LB	Pts	Qualification
1	Hull	30	27	0	3	906	402	+504	21	2	132	Promotion place
2	Sedgley Park	30	25	1	4	1112	457	+655	22	4	128	
3	Rotherham Titans	30	24	2	4	955	553	+402	19	3	123	
4	Stourbridge	29	21	0	8	1036	766	+270	23	3	110	
5	Fylde	30	21	1	8	1049	638	+411	19	3	108	
6	Hull Ionians	30	18	2	10	856	650	+206	14	6	96	
7	Tynedale	30	13	1	16	732	881	−149	16	5	75	
8	Luctonians	30	14	0	16	608	529	+79	8	9	74	
9	Sheffield Tigers	30	13	0	17	649	744	−95	7	6	65	
10	Loughborough Students	30	10	0	20	702	843	−141	13	10	63	
11	Chester	30	12	1	17	645	803	−158	9	3	62	
12	Wharfedale	30	11	1	18	625	823	−198	9	5	60	
13	Bournville	30	8	1	21	743	1038	−295	12	6	52	
14	Blaydon	30	7	0	23	599	1057	−458	10	4	42	
15	Huddersfield	29	7	0	22	494	831	−337	7	6	41	
16	Harrogate	30	3	0	27	402	1098	−696	4	3	19	

Updated to match(es) played on 2 June 2022. Source: "National League 2 North". RugbyEngland.
Rules for classification: If teams are level at any stage, tiebreakers are applied in the following order:
1. Number of matches won
2. Difference between points for and against
3. Total number of points for
4. Aggregate number of points scored in matches between tied teams
5. Number of matches won excluding the first match, then the second and so on until the tie is settled

== Fixtures & results ==
Fixtures for the season were announced by the RFU on 4 May 2021.

=== Round 1 ===
4 September 2021
15:00

(1 BP) Blaydon	23 – 27	Loughborough Students

Crow Trees
Attendance: 248
Referee: Michael Harris

4 September 2021
15:00

Chester	14 – 29	Hull Ionians (1 BP)

Hare Lane
Attendance: 670
Referee: Dan Jones

4 September 2021
15:00

Harrogate	21 – 51	Sedgley Park (1 BP)

Rudding Lane
Attendance: 250
Referee: Callum Watson

4 September 2021
15:00

(1 BP) Huddersfield	19 – 24	Bournville

Lockwood Park
Attendance: 274
Referee: Daniel Woods

4 September 2021
15:00

(1 BP) Hull	27 – 8	Luctonians

Ferens Ground
Attendance: 254
Referee: Owen Taylor

4 September 2021
15:00

(1 BP) Rotherham Titans	35 – 5	Wharfedale

Clifton Lane
Attendance: 531
Referee: Carl Adams

4 September 2021
15:00

(1 BP) Stourbridge	31 – 27	Sheffield Tigers (1 BP)

Stourton Park
Attendance: 542
Referee: Dan Parrott

4 September 2021
15:00

Tynedale	24 – 48	Fylde (1 BP)

Tynedale Park
Attendance: 400
Referee: Elliot Lewis

=== Round 2 ===
11 September 2021
14:30

Sedgley Park	22 – 22	Rotherham Titans

Park Lane
Attendance: 300
Referee: Aaron Harris

11 September 2021
15:00

Blaydon	11 – 29	Huddersfield (1 BP)

Crow Trees
Attendance: 232
Referee: Ben Rayner

11 September 2021
15:00

(1 BP) Bournville	47 – 20	Harrogate

Avery Fields
Attendance: 285
Referee: Peter Caunt

11 September 2021
15:00

(1 BP) Fylde	29 – 17	Loughborough Students

Woodlands Memorial Ground
Attendance: 225
Referee: James O'Brien

11 September 2021
15:00

(1 BP) Hull Ionians	50 – 14	Tynedale

Brantingham Park
Attendance: 198
Referee: Llyr ApGeraint Roberts

11 September 2021
15:00

Luctonians	P – P (Note: Match postponed due to positive COVID-19 tests in the Luctonian squad.)	Chester

Mortimer Park

11 September 2021
15:00

Sheffield Tigers	23 – 15	Wharfedale

Dore Moor
Attendance: 276
Referee: Daniel Woods

11 September 2021
15:00

Stourbridge	19 – 17	Hull (1 BP)

Stourton Park
Attendance: 305
Referee: Elliott Lewis

=== Round 3 ===
18 September 2021
13:00

(1 BP) Loughborough Students	29 – 24	Hull Ionians (1 BP)

East Park
Attendance: 238
Referee: Dan Parrot

18 September 2021
14:00

(1 BP) Hull	29 – 0	Sheffield Tigers

Ferens Ground
Attendance: 400
Referee: Dave Charlton

18 September 2021
14:00

(1 BP) Rotherham Titans	48 – 46	Bournville (2 BP)

Clifton Lane
Attendance: 587
Referee: Lloyd Hayes

18 September 2021
15:00

Chester	27 – 36	Stourbridge (1 BP)

Hare Lane
Attendance: 350
Referee: Elliot Lewis

18 September 2021
15:00

Harrogate	17 – 12	Blaydon (1 BP)

Rudding Lane
Attendance: 150
Referee: Peter Conor

18 September 2021
15:00

(1 BP) Huddersfield	15 – 22	Fylde

Lockwood Park
Attendance: 262
Referee: Matthew Riley

18 September 2021
15:00

Tynedale	18 – 10	Luctonians

Tynedale Park
Attendance: 425
Referee: James Ellis

18 September 2021
15:00

(1 BP) Wharfedale	26 – 43	Sedgley Park (1 BP)

The Avenue
Attendance: 475
Referee: Michael Harris

=== Round 4 ===
25 September 2021

Blaydon	17 – 49	Rotherham Titans (1 BP)

Crow Trees
Attendance: 262
Referee: Michael Harris

25 September 2021

(1 BP) Bournville	66 – 13	Wharfedale

Avery Fields
Attendance: 300
Referee: Elliott Lewis

25 September 2021

(1 BP) Fylde	80 – 26	Harrogate (1 BP)

Woodlands Memorial Ground
Attendance: 390
Referee: Tim Allatt

25 September 2021

(1 BP) Hull	31 – 10	Chester

Ferens Ground
Attendance: 275
Referee: Llyr Apgeraint-Roberts

25 September 2021

(1 BP) Hull Ionians	31 – 17	Huddersfield

Brantingham Park
Attendance: 217
Referee: Carl Adams

25 September 2021

(1 BP) Luctonians	22 – 28	Loughborough Students (1 BP)

Mortimer Park
Attendance: 550
Referee: Dan Jones

25 September 2021

Sheffield Tigers	16 – 32	Sedgley Park (1 BP)

Dore Moor
Attendance: 284
Referee: Ben Davis

25 September 2021

(1 BP) Stourbridge	30 – 5	Tynedale

Stourton Park
Attendance: 305
Referee: Peter Caunt

=== Round 5 ===
2 October 2021
14:00

Loughborough Students	P – P	Stourbridge

East Park

2 October 2021
14:00

Rotherham Titans	28 – 13	Fylde

Clifton Lane
Attendance: 517
Referee: Owen Taylor

2 October 2021
14:30

Sedgley Park	20 – 6	Bournville

Park Lane
Attendance: 250
Referee: Llyr ApGeraint-Roberts

2 October 2021
15:00

(1 BP) Chester	35 – 24	Sheffield Tigers

Hare Lane
Attendance: 250
Referee: Iain Kly

2 October 2021
15:00

Harrogate	13 – 36	Hull Ionians (1 BP)

Rudding Lane
Attendance: 350
Referee: Ben Davis

2 October 2021
15:00

(1 BP) Huddersfield	10 – 12	Luctonians

Lockwood Park
Attendance: 248
Referee: Nathan Howarth

2 October 2021
15:00

(1 BP) Tynedale	11 – 17	Hull

Tynedale Park
Attendance: 260
Referee: Michael Harris

2 October 2021
15:00

Wharfedale	23 – 8	Blaydon

The Avenue
Attendance: 420
Referee: George Richardson

=== Round 6 ===
9 October 2021
15:00

Blaydon	16 – 66	Sedgley Park (1 BP)

Crow Trees
Attendance: 173
Referee: Elliott Lewis

9 October 2021
15:00

(1 BP) Chester	32 – 31	Tynedale (2 BP)

Hare Lane
Attendance: 300
Referee: Veryan Boscawen

9 October 2021
15:00

(1 BP) Fylde	48 – 18	Wharfedale

Woodlands Memorial Ground
Attendance: 520
Referee: James O'Brien

9 October 2021
15:00

(1 BP) Hull	26 – 19	Loughborough Students (1 BP)

Ferens Ground
Attendance: 250
Referee: Owen Taylor-Thorne

9 October 2021
15:00

(1 BP) Hull Ionians	24 – 27	Rotherham Titans (1 BP)

Brantingham Park
Attendance: 425
Referee: Peter Caunt

9 October 2021
15:00

Luctonians	P – P	Harrogate

Mortimer Park

9 October 2021
15:00

Sheffield Tigers	19 – 17	Bournville (1 BP)

Dore Moor
Attendance: 273
Referee: Daniel Woods

9 October 2021
15:00

(1 BP) Stourbridge	61 – 22	Huddersfield (1 BP)

Stourton Park
Attendance: 345
Referee: George Richardson

=== Round 7 ===
16 October 2021
14:00

(1 BP) Loughborough Students	42 – 28	Chester (1 BP)

East Park
Attendance: 329
Referee: Carl Adams

16 October 2021
14:00

(1 BP) Rotherham Titans	37 – 22	Luctonians

Clifton Lane
Attendance: 594
Referee: Daniel Woods

16 October 2021
14:30

(1 BP) Sedgley Park	37 – 22	Fylde

Park Lane
Attendance: 300
Referee: Llyr ApGeraint-Roberts

16 October 2021
15:00

(2 BP) Bournville	26 – 27	Blaydon (1 BP)

Avery Fields
Attendance: 310
Referee: Andy Wigley

16 October 2021
15:00

(1 BP) Harrogate	22 – 46	Stourbridge (1 BP)

Rudding Lane
Attendance: 250
Referee: Owen Taylor

16 October 2021
15:00

Huddersfield	7 – 27	Hull (1 BP)

Lockwood Park
Attendance: 239
Referee: Alistair Thompson

16 October 2021
15:00

Tynedale	P – P	Sheffield Tigers

Tynedale Park

16 October 2021
15:00

Wharfedale	14 – 14	Hull Ionians

The Avenue
Attendance: 365
Referee: Ben Davis

=== Round 8 ===
23 October 2021
14:00

(1 BP) Hull	25 – 0	Harrogate

Ferens Ground
Attendance: 213
Referee: Dan Woods

23 October 2021
15:00

(1 BP) Chester	54 – 24	Huddersfield

Hare Lane
Attendance: 350
Referee: George Richardson

23 October 2021
15:00

(1 BP) Fylde	73 – 7	Bourneville

Woodlands Memorial Ground
Attendance: 457
Referee: Ben Davis

23 October 2021
15:00

(1 BP) Hull Ionians	21 – 28	Sedgley Park

Brantingham Park
Attendance: 500
Referee: Richard Gordon

23 October 2021
15:00

(2 BP) Luctonians	26 – 32	Wharfedale (1 BP)

Mortimer Park
Attendance: 427
Referee: David Philpot

23 October 2021
15:00

(1 BP) Sheffield Tigers	34 – 12	Blaydon

Dore Moor
Attendance: 242
Referee: Callum Watson

23 October 2021
15:00

Stourbridge	P – P	Rotherham Titans

Stourton Park

23 October 2021
15:00

(1 BP) Tynedale	36 – 19	Loughborough Students

Tynedale Park
Attendance: 300
Referee: Nathan Howarth

=== Round 9 ===
30 October 2021
14:00

(2 BP) Loughborough Students	31 – 33	Sheffield Tigers

East Park
Attendance: 315
Referee: Dan Rowlands

30 October 2021
14:00

Rotherham Titans	20 – 15	Hull (1 BP)

Clifton Lane
Attendance: 544
Referee: Llyr ApGerainte-Roberts

30 October 2021
14:30

(1 BP) Sedgley Park	38 – 7	Luctonians

Park Lane
Attendance: 400
Referee: Owen Taylor

30 October 2021
15:00

Blaydon	20 – 40	Fylde (1 BP)

Crow Trees
Attendance: 135
Referee: Michael Harrisw

30 October 2021
15:00

(2 BP) Bourneville	43 – 46	Hull Ionians (1 BP)

Avery Fields
Attendance: 350
Referee: Benjamin Davis

30 October 2021
15:00

(1 BP) Harrogate	11 – 14	Chester

Rudding Lane
Attendance: 100
Referee: Ben Rayner

30 October 2021
15:00

Huddersfield	P – P (Note: Match postponed due to Covid-19)	Tynedale

Lockwood Park

30 October 2021
15:00

Wharfdale	20 – 30	Stourbridge (1 BP)

The Avenue
Attendance: 415
Referee: Nikki O'Donnell

=== Rounds 2, 5 & 7 (rescheduled matches) ===
6 November 2021
14:00

(1 BP) Tynedale	24 – 18	Sheffield Tigers (1 BP)

Tynedale Park
Attendance: 380
Referee: Nikki O'Donnell

6 November 2021
14:15

(1 BP) Luctonians	7 – 11	Chester

Mortimer Park
Attendance: 327
Referee: Peter Cant

6 November 2021
16:00

Loughborough Students	22 – 38	Stourbridge (1 BP)

East Park
Attendance: 278
Referee: Callum Watson

=== Round 10 ===
13 November 2021
14:00

(1 BP) Hull	41 – 8	Wharfedale

Ferens Ground
Attendance: 270
Referee: Ben Davis

13 November 2021
14:00

(1 BP) Hull Ionians	51 – 19	Blaydon

Brantingham Park
Attendance: 185
Referee: Matthew Riley

13 November 2021
14:00

(1 BP) Loughborough Students	33 – 29	Huddersfield (1 BP)

East Park
Attendance: 213
Referee: Michael Lamb

13 November 2021
14:00

Sheffield Tigers	12 – 43	Fylde (1 BP)

Dore Moor
Attendance: 256
Referee: Peter Caunt

13 November 2021
14:00

(2 BP) Tynedale	31 – 38	Harrogate (1 BP)

Tynedale Park
Attendance: 375
Referee: Daniel Woods

13 November 2021
14:15

Luctonians	17 – 11	Bournville (1 BP)

Mortimer Park
Attendance: 425
Referee: Dan Jones

13 November 2021
15:00

Chester	P – P	Rotherham Titans

Hare Lane

13 November 2021
15:00

(1 BP) Stourbridge	32 – 31	Sedgley Park (2 BP)

Stourton Park
Attendance: 671
Referee: Dan Rowlands

=== Round 11 ===
20 November 2021
14:00

(1 BP) Blaydon	26 – 38	Luctonians (1 BP)

Crow Trees
Attendance: 155
Referee: Ben Rayner

20 November 2021
14:00

Harrogate	15 – 24	Loughborough Students (1 BP)

Rudding Lane
Attendance: 300
Referee: Andy Morton

20 November 2021
14:00

(1 BP) Rotherham Titans	38 – 14	Tynedale

Clifton Lane
Attendance: 523
Referee: Benjamin Davis

20 November 2021
14:00

Wharfedale	20 – 10	Chester

The Avenue
Attendance: 397
Referee: Callum Watson

20 November 2021
14:30

(1 BP) Sedgley Park	17 – 22	Hull

Park Lane
Attendance: 381
Referee: James O'Brien

20 November 2021
15:00

Bourneville	22 – 52	Stourbridge (1 BP)

Avery Fields
Attendance: 500
Referee: Harry Walbaum

20 November 2021
15:00

Fylde	28 – 12	Hull Ionians

Woodlands Memorial Ground
Attendance: 420
Referee: Elliott Lewis

20 November 2021
15:00

(1 BP) Huddersfield	31 – 27	Sheffield Tigers (1 BP)

Lockwood Park
Attendance: 224
Referee: Llyr ApGeraint-Roberts

=== Round 12 ===
27 November 2021
14:00

Chester	14 – 42	Sedgley Park (1 BP)

Hare Lane
Attendance: 223
Referee: Benjamin Davis

27 November 2021
14:00

Hull	P – P	Bourneville

Ferens Ground

27 November 2021
14:00

Loughborough Students	7 – 71	Rotherham Titans (1 BP)

East Park
Attendance: 218
Referee: Peter Connor

27 November 2021
14:00

Sheffield Tigers	P – P	Hull Ionians

Dore Moor

27 November 2021
14:00

Tynedale	24 – 13	Wharfedale

Tynedale Park
Attendance: 230
Referee: Nikki O'Donnell

27 November 2021
14:15

Luctonians	15 – 14	Fylde (1 BP)

Mortimer Park
Attendance: 316
Referee: Max Weston

27 November 2021
15:00

Huddersfield	23 – 7	Harrogate

Lockwood Park
Attendance: 202
Referee: Elliott Lewis

27 November 2021
15:00

Stourbridge	P – P	Blaydon

Stourton Park

=== Round 13 ===
4 December 2021
14:00

Blaydon	19 – 38	Hull (1 BP)

Crow Trees
Attendance: 212
Referee: Elliott Lewis

4 December 2021
14:00

Harrogate	7 – 27	Sheffield Tigers

Rudding Lane
Attendance: 200
Referee: Nathan Howarth

4 December 2021
14:00

Hull Ionians	18 – 7	Luctonians

Brantingham Park
Attendance: 120
Referee: David Charlton

4 December 2021
14:00

(1 BP) Rotherham Titans	26 – 12	Huddersfield

Clifton Lane
Attendance: 487
Referee: Daniel Woods

4 December 2021
14:00

Wharfedale	15 – 14	Loughborough Students (1 BP)

The Avenue
Attendance: 220
Referee: Timothy Allat

4 December 2021
14:30

(1 BP) Sedgley Park	41 – 7	Tynedale

Park Lane
Attendance: 250
Referee: Benjamin Davis

4 December 2021
15:00

Bourneville	22 – 14	Chester

Avery Fields
Attendance: 250
Referee: Peter Connor

4 December 2021
15:00

Fylde	15 – 10	Stourbridge (1 BP)

Woodlands Memorial Grounds
Attendance: 425
Referee: Michael Harris

=== Round 14 ===
11 December 2021
14:00

Harrogate	10 – 26	Rotherham Titans (1 BP)

Rudding Lane
Attendance: 50
Referee: George Jones

11 December 2021
14:00

Hull	22 – 14	Fylde

Ferens Ground
Attendance: 133
Referee: Daniel Woods

11 December 2021
14:00

Sheffield Tigers	27 – 0	Luctonians

Dore Moor
Attendance: 101
Referee: Callum Watson

11 December 2021
14:00

(1 BP) Tynedale	48 – 12	Bourneville

Tynedale Park
Attendance: 287
Referee: Michael Harris

11 December 2021
15:00

(1 BP) Chester	33 – 21	Blaydon

Hare Lane
Attendance: 250
Referee: Benjamin Davis

11 December 2021
15:00

Huddersfield	12 – 20	Wharfdale

Lockwood Park
Attendance: 332
Referee: Elliot Lewis

11 December 2021
15:00

(1 BP) Stourbridge	42 – 15	Hull Ionians

Stourton Park
Attendance: 414
Referee: Dan Parrott

11 December 2021
16:00

Loughborough Students	14 – 43	Sedgley Park (1 BP)

East Park
Attendance: 212
Referee: Simon Waite

=== Round 15 ===
18 December 2021
14:00

Blaydon	19 – 14	Tynedale (1 BP)

Crow Trees
Attendance: 682
Referee: Alan Chandrachud

18 December 2021
14:00

(1 BP) Hull Ionians	16 – 22	Hull

Brantingham Park
Attendance: 733
Referee: Owen Taylor

18 December 2021
14:00

Rotherham Titans	P – P	Sheffield Tigers

Clifton Lane

18 December 2021
14:00

Wharfedale	P – P	Harrogate

The Avenue

18 December 2021
14:15

Luctonians	24 – 19	Stourbridge (1 BP)

Mortimer Park
Attendance: 670
Referee: Lloyd Davies

18 December 2021
14:30

Sedgley Park	P – P	Huddersfield

Park Lane

18 December 2021
15:00

Bournville	P – P	Loughborough Students

Avery Fields

18 December 2021
15:00

(1 BP) Fylde	40 – 10	Chester

Woodlands Memorial Ground
Attendance: 360
Referee: Peter Connor

=== Round 16 ===
8 January 2022
14:00

(1 BP) Harrogate	17 – 24	Bourneville

Rudding Lane
Attendance: 150
Referee: Carl Adams

8 January 2022
14:00

(1 BP) Hull	48 – 5	Stourbridge

Ferens Ground
Attendance: 149
Referee: David Rowlands

8 January 2021
14:00

(2 BP) Loughborough Students	28 – 32	Fylde (1 BP)

East Park
Attendance: 234
Referee: Llyr ApGeraint-Roberts

8 January 2022
14:00

Rotherham Titans	13 – 12	Sedgley Park (1 BP)

Clifton Lane
Attendance: 411
Referee: Timothy Allatt

8 January 2022
14:00

Tynedale	18 – 18	Hull Ionians

Tynedale Park
Attendance: 420
Referee: Owen Taylor

8 January 2022
14:00

(1 BP) Wharfedale	9 – 13	Sheffield Tigers

The Avenue
Attendance: 325
Referee: Benjamin Davis

8 January 2022
15:00

Chester	18 – 13	Luctonians (1 BP)

Hare Lane
Attendance: 300
Referee: Elliott Lewis

8 January 2021
15:00

(1 BP) Huddersfield	35 – 19	Blaydon

Lockwood Park
Attendance: 226
Referee: Daniel Woods

=== Round 17 ===
15 January 2022
14:00

Blaydon	12 – 29	Harrogate (1 BP)

Crow Trees
Attendance: 299
Referee: Nikki O'Donnell

15 January 2022
14:00

Hull Ionians	24 – 23	Loughborough Students (1 BP)

Brantingham Park
Attendance: 192
Referee: Peter Caunt

15 January 2022
14:00

Sheffield Tigers	10 – 33	Hull (1 BP)

Dore Moor
Attendance: 238
Referee: Peter Connor

15 January 2022
14:15

(1 BP) Luctonians	32 – 14	Tynedale

Mortimer Park
Attendance: 468
Referee: Carl Adams

15 January 2022
14:30

(1 BP) Sedgley Park	29 – 25	Wharfdale (1 BP)

Park Lane
Attendance: 300
Referee: Daniel Woods

15 January 2022
15:00

Bourneville	17 – 17	Rotherham Titans

Avery Fields
Attendance: 350
Referee: James O'Brien

15 January 2022
15:00

(1 BP) Fylde	38 – 5	Huddersfield

Woodlands Memorial Ground
Attendance: 380
Referee: Elliott Lewis

15 January 2022
15:00

(1 BP) Stourbridge	32 – 17	Chester

Stourton Park
Attendance: 301
Referee: Llyr ApGeraint-Roberts

=== Round 18 ===
22 January 2022
14:00

Harrogate	8 – 33	Fylde (1 BP)

Rudding Lane
Attendance: 300
Referee: Ben Davis

22 January 2022
14:00

Loughborough Students	19 – 14	Luctonians (1 BP)

East Park
Attendance: 234
Referee: George Jones

22 January 2022
14:00

(1 BP) Rotherham Titans	59 – 7	Blaydon

Clifton Lane
Attendance: 197
Referee: Peter Connor

22 January 2022
14:00

(1 BP) Tynedale	26 – 52	Stourbridge (1 BP)

Tynedale Park
Attendance: 540
Referee: Ben Ryner

22 January 2022
14:00

(1 BP) Wharfedale	30 – 18	Bourneville

The Avenue
Attendance: 467
Referee: Daniel Woods

22 January 2022
14:30

(1 BP) Sedgley Park	49 – 0	Sheffield Tigers

Park Lane
Attendance: 212
Referee: Elliott Lewis

22 January 2022
15:00

Chester	19 – 40	Hull (1 BP)

Hare Lane
Attendance: 200
Referee: Callum Watson

22 January 2022
14:00

Huddersfield	3 – 33	Hull Ionians (1 BP)

Lockwood Park
Attendance: 284
Referee: Llyr ApGeraint-Roberts

=== Round 19 ===
29 January 2022
14:00

(1 BP) Blaydon	24 – 38	Wharfedale (1 BP)

Crow Trees
Attendance: 167
Referee: Elliott Lewis

29 January 2022
14:00

(1 BP) Hull	60 – 10	Tynedale

Ferens Ground
Attendance: 213
Referee: Llyr ApGeraint-Roberts

29 January 2022
14:00

(1 BP) Hull Ionians	47 – 14	Harrogate

Brantingham Park
Attendance: 358
Referee: Nathan Howarth

29 January 2022
14:00

Sheffield Tigers	10 – 7	Chester (1 BP)

Dore Moor
Attendance: 242
Referee: Benjamin Davis

29 January 2022
14:15

(1 BP) Luctonians	17 – 22	Huddersfield

Mortimer Park
Attendance: 357
Referee: Lloyd Davies

29 January 2022
15:00

Bourneville	P – P	Sedgley Park

Avery Fields

29 January 2022
15:00

Fylde	21 – 17	Rotherham Titans (1 BP)

Woodlands Memorial Ground
Attendance: 800
Referee: Ben Rayner

29 January 2022
15:00

(1 BP) Stourbridge	46 – 24	Loughborough Students (1 BP)

Stourton Park
Attendance: 251
Referee: Benjamin Wood

=== Rounds 6, 8, 9 & 12 (rescheduled matches) ===
5 February 2022
14:00

(1 BP) Hull	50 – 22	Bourneville (1 BP)

Ferens Ground
Attendance: 225
Referee: Michael Harris

5 February 2022
14:00

(1 BP) Sheffield Tigers	13 – 16	Hull Ionians

Dore Moor
Attendance: 202
Referee: Will Evans

5 February 2022
14:15

(1 BP) Luctonians	75 – 0	Harrogate

Mortimer Park
Attendance: 377
Referee: Daniel Rowlands

5 February 2022
15:00

Huddersfield	5 – 19	Tynedale

Lockwood Park
Attendance: 215
Referee: Timothy Allatt

5 February 2022
15:00

(1 BP) Stourbridge	33 – 48	Rotherham Titans (1 BP)

Stourton Park
Attendance: 281
Referee: Ben Jacobs

=== Round 20 ===
12 February 2022
14:00

Harrogate	0 – 21	Luctonians

Rudding Lane
Attendance: 150
Referee: Llyr Apgeraint-Roberts

12 February 2022
14:00

Loughborough Students	0 – 39	Hull (1 BP)

East Park
Attendance: 182
Referee: Nathan Howard

12 February 2022
14:00

(1 BP) Rotherham Titans	40 – 12	Hull Ionians

Clifton Lane
Attendance: 377
Referee: Nikki O'Donnell

12 February 2022
14:00

(1 BP) Tynedale	38 – 14	Chester

Tynedale Park
Attendance: 440
Referee: Michael Harris

12 February 2022
14:00

Wharfedale	10 – 20	Fylde

The Avenue
Attendance: 478
Referee: Tim Allot

12 February 2022
14:30

(1 BP) Sedgley Park	31 – 0	Blaydon

Park Lane
Attendance: 313
Referee: Ben Rayner

12 February 2022
15:00

Bourneville	21 – 30	Sheffield Tigers (1 BP)

Avery Fields
Attendance: 250
Referee: George Richardson

12 February 2022
15:00

Huddersfield	P – P	Stourbridge

Lockwood Park

=== Round 21 ===
19 February 2022
14:00

(1 BP) Blaydon	36 – 14	Bourneville

Crow Trees
Attendance: 167
Referee: Daniel Woods

19 February 2022
14:00

Hull	C – C (Note: Hull awarded 5 point walkover win as Huddersfield could not fulfill fixture.)	Huddersfield

Ferens Ground

19 February 2022
14:00

Hull Ionians	15 – 3	Wharfedale

Brantingham Park
Attendance: 255
Referee: Callum Watson

19 February 2022
14:00

Sheffield Tigers	P – P	Tynedale

Dore Moor

19 February 2022
14:15

(1 BP) Luctonians	10 – 12	Rotherham Titans

Mortimer Park
Attendance: 354
Referee: George Richardson

19 February 2022
15:00

(1 BP) Chester	30 – 24	Loughborough Students (2 BP)

Hare Lane
Attendance: 250
Referee: Matthew Riley

19 February 2022
15:00

Fylde	0 – 38	Sedgley Park (1 BP)

Woodlands Memorial Ground
Attendance: 580
Referee: Ben Davis

19 February 2022
15:00

(1 BP) Stourbridge	74 – 17	Harrogate

Stourton Park
Attendance: 435
Referee: George Jones

=== Round 22 ===
26 February 2022
14:00

(1 BP) Blaydon	26 – 14	Sheffield Tigers

Crow Trees
Attendance: 178
Referee: Llyr ApGeraint-Roberts

26 February 2022
14:00

Harrogate	10 – 27	Hull (1 BP)

Rudding Lane
Attendance: 150
Referee: Ben Davis

26 February 2022
14:00

Rotherham Titans	17 – 10	Stourbridge (1 BP)

Clifton Lane
Attendance: 394
Referee: Owen Taylor

26 February 2022
14:00

(1 BP) Wharfedale	10 – 16	Luctonians

The Avenue
Attendance: 324
Referee: James O'Brien

26 February 2022
14:30

Sedgley Park	27 – 21	Hull Ionians (1 BP)

Park Lane
Attendance: 213
Referee: Elliot Lewis

26 February 2022
15:00

(1 BP) Bourneville	33 – 47	Fylde (1 BP)

Avery Fields
Attendance: 200
Referee: Peter Connor

26 February 2022
15:00

(1 BP) Huddersfield	10 – 17	Chester

Lockwood Park
Attendance: 196
Referee: Callum Watson

26 February 2022
15:00

(2 BP) Loughborough Students	31 – 32	Tynedale (1 BP)

East Park
Attendance: 287
Referee: George Richardson

=== Round 23 ===
5 March 2022
14:00

Hull	20 – 17	Rotherham Titans (1 BP)

Ferens Ground
Attendance: 576
Referee: Tim Allatt

5 March 2022
14:00

(1 BP) Tynedale	53 – 19	Huddersfield

Tynedale Park
Attendance: 450
Referee: Nikki O'Donnell

5 March 2022
15:00

(1 BP) Chester	34 – 14	Harrogate

Hare Lane
Attendance: 250
Referee: Benjamin Wood

5 March 2022
15:00

(1 BP) Fylde	79 – 31	Blaydon (1 BP)

Woodlands Memorial Ground
Attendance: 192
Referee: James O'Brien

5 March 2022
15:00

(1 BP) Hull Ionians	52 – 5	Bourneville

Brantingham Park
Attendance: 169
Referee: Peter Connor

5 March 2022
15:00

(1 BP) Lutonians	13 – 15	Sedgley Park

Mortimer Park
Attendance: 397
Referee: Peter Caunt

5 March 2022
15:00

Sheffield Tigers	20 – 12	Loughborough Students

Dore Moor
Attendance: 244
Referee: Benjamin Davis

5 March 2022
15:00

(1 BP) Stourbridge	60 – 27	Wharfedale (1 BP)

Stourton Park
Attendance: 425
Referee: George Richardson

=== Round 24 ===
12 March 2022
14:00

(1 BP) Rotherham Titans	33 – 28	Chester (2 BP)

Clifton Lane
Attendance: 364
Referee: Daniel Woods

12 March 2022
14:00

Harrogate	16 – 24	Tynedale (1 BP)

Rudding Lane
Attendance: 75
Referee: George Richardson

12 March 2022
14:30

(1 BP) Sedgley Park	50 – 12	Stourbridge

Park Lane
Attendance: 503
Referee: Nikki O'Donnell

12 March 2022
15:00

(1 BP) Blaydon	36 – 26	Hull Ionians (1 BP)

Crow Trees
Attendance: 127
Referee: Nathan Howarth

12 March 2022
15:00

Bourneville	12 – 35	Luctonians (1 BP)

Avery Fields
Attendance: 170
Referee: Callum Watson

12 March 2022
15:00

(1 BP) Fylde	62 – 17	Sheffield Tigers

Woodlands Memorial Ground
Attendance: 473
Referee: Daniel Rowlands

12 March 2022
15:00

Huddersfield	24 – 20	Loughborough Students (1 BP)

Lockwood Park
Attendance: 214
Referee: Owen Taylor

12 March 2022
15:00

Wharfedale	12 – 43	Hull (1 BP)

The Avenue
Attendance: 431
Referee: Ben Davies

=== Rounds 10, 12, 15 & 21 (rescheduled matches) ===
19 March 2022
14:30

(1 BP) Sedgley Park	80 – 5	Huddersfield

Park Lane
Attendance: 567
Referee: Daniel Woods

19 March 2022
15:00

(1 BP) Bourneville	26 – 24	Loughborough Students (2 BP)

Avery Fields
Attendance: 281
Referee: Tom Evans-Jones

19 March 2022
15:00

Chester	17 – 34	Rotherham Titans (1 BP)

Hare Lane
Attendance: 250
Referee: Benjamin Davis

19 March 2022
15:00

(2 BP) Sheffield Tigers	22 – 24	Tynedale (1 BP)

Dore Moor
Attendance: 255
Referee: James O'Brien

19 March 2022
15:00

(1 BP) Stourbridge	45 – 38	Blaydon (2 BP)

Stourton Park
Attendance: 277
Referee: Lloyd Davies

19 March 2022
15:00

Wharfedale	23 – 21	Harrogate (1 BP)

The Avenue
Attendance: 459
Referee: Owen Taylor

=== Round 25 ===
26 March 2022
14:00

Hull	24 – 19	Sedgley Park (1 BP)

Ferens Ground
Attendance: 450
Referee: Adam Wookey

26 March 2022
14:00

(1 BP) Loughborough Students	55 – 0	Harrogate

East Park
Attendance: 350
Referee: Daniel Woods

26 March 2022
14:00

(1 BP) Tynedale	31 – 47	Rotherham Titans (1 BP)

Tynedale Park
Attendance: 280
Referee: Tim Allett

26 March 2022
15:00

Chester	17 – 16	Wharfedale (1 BP)

Hare Lane
Attendance: 300
Referee: Mr Connor

26 March 2022
15:00

(1 BP) Hull Ionians	45 – 36	Fylde (1 BP)

Brantingham Park
Attendance: 313
Referee: Michael Harris

26 March 2022
15:00

(1 BP) Luctonians	43 – 0	Blaydon

Mortimer Park
Attendance: 530
Referee: Iain Kly

26 March 2022
15:00

(1 BP) Sheffield Tigers	33 – 3	Huddersfield

Dore Moor
Attendance: 184
Referee: Elliot Lewis

26 March 2022
15:00

(1 BP) Stourbridge	61 – 24	Bourneville

Stourton Park
Attendance: 677
Referee: Matt Riley

=== Round 26 ===
2 April 2022
14:00

(1 BP) Rotherham Titans	47 – 17	Loughborough Students

Clifton Lane
Attendance: 317
Referee: Tim Allatt

2 April 2022
14:30

(1 BP) Sedgley Park	26 – 22	Chester (1 BP)

Park Lane
Attendance: 289
Referee: Elliott Lewis

2 April 2022
15:00

Blaydon	19 – 36	Stourbridge (1 BP)

Crow Trees
Attendance: 213
Referee: Llyr Apgeraint-Roberts

2 April 2022
15:00

Bourneville	14 – 40	Hull (1 BP)

Avery Fields
Attendance: 200
Referee: Daniel Rowlands

2 April 2022
15:00

(1 BP) Fylde	35 – 22	Luctonians (1 BP)

Woodlands Memorial Ground
Attendance: 626
Referee: Owen Taylor

2 April 2022
15:00

Harrogate	13 – 21	Huddersfield

Rudding Lane
Attendance: 150
Referee: Ben Rayner

2 April 2022
15:00

Hull Ionians	21 – 17	Sheffield Tigers (1 BP)

Brantingham Park
Attendance: 208
Referee: Daniel Woods

2 April 2022
15:00

(2 BP) Wharfedale	37 – 42	Tynedale (1 BP)

The Avenue
Attendance: 455
Referee: James O'Brien

=== Round 27 ===
9 April 2022
14:00

(1 BP) Hull	57 – 17	Blaydon

Ferens Ground
Attendance: 539
Referee: Owen Taylor

9 April 2022
14:00

(1 BP) Loughborough Students	43 – 12	Wharfedale

East Park
Attendance: 222
Referee: Llyr Apgeraint-Roberts

9 April 2022
15:00

(1 BP) Chester	48 – 31	Bourneville (1 BP)

Hare Lane
Attendance: 362
Referee: James O'Brien

9 April 2022
15:00

(1 BP) Huddersfield	36 – 31	Rotherham Titans (2 BP)

Lockwood Park
Attendance: 233
Referee: Benjamin Davis

9 April 2022
15:00

(1 BP) Luctonians	20 – 21	Hull Ionians

Mortimer Park
Attendance: 452
Referee: Lloyd Davies

9 April 2022
15:00

(1 BP) Sheffield Tigers	62 – 8	Harrogate

Dore Moor
Attendance: 298
Referee: Daniel Rowlands

9 April 2022
15:00

(1 BP) Stourbridge	37 – 33	Fylde (2 BP)

Stourton Park
Attendance: 244
Referee: Daniel Woods

9 April 2022
15:00

Tynedale	14 – 45	Sedgley Park (1 BP)

Tynedale Park
Attendance: 305
Referee: Matt Riley

=== Round 28 ===
16 April 2022
14:00

Rotherham Titans	C – C (Note: Match cancelled due Harrogate unable to field a team. Rotherham awarded 5 pts)	Harrogate

Clifton Lane

16 April 2022
14:30

(1 BP) Sedgley Park	27 – 19	Loughborough Students

Park Lane
Attendance: 311
Referee: Elliott Lewis

16 April 2022
15:00

(1 BP) Blaydon	38 – 19	Chester

Crow Trees
Attendance: 207
Referee: Adam Wookey

16 April 2022
15:00

(1 BP) Bournville	36 – 31	Tynedale (2 BP)

Avery Fields
Attendance: 200
Referee: Lloyd Davies

16 April 2022
15:00

(2 BP) Fylde	26 – 28	Hull (1 BP)

Woodlands Memorial Ground
Attendance: 962
Referee: Ben Rayner

16 April 2022
15:00

(1 BP) Hull Ionians	42 – 28	Stourbridge (1 BP)

Brantingham Park
Attendance: 228
Referee: Nikki O'Donnell

16 April 2022
15:00

(1 BP) Luctonians	31 – 19	Sheffield Tigers

Mortimer Park
Attendance: 653
Referee: Nathan Howarth

16 April 2022
15:00

(1 BP) Wharfedale	37 – 31	Huddersfield (2 BP)

The Avenue
Attendance: 474
Referee: Callum Watson

=== Round 29 ===
23 April 2022
14:00

(1 BP) Hull	31 – 29	Hull Ionians (2 BP)

Ferens Ground
Attendance: 950
Referee: Timothy Allatt

23 April 2022
14:00

Loughborough Students	19 – 16	Bourneville (1 BP)

East Park
Attendance: 235
Referee: George Richardson

23 April 2022
15:00

Chester	20 – 20	Fylde

Hare Lane
Attendance: 300
Referee: Callum Watson

23 April 2022
15:00

Harrogate	18 – 56	Wharfedale (1 BP)

Rudding Lane
Attendance: 300
Referee: Elliott Lewis

23 April 2022
15:00

Huddersfield	7 – 35	Sedgley Park (1 BP)

Lockwood Park
Attendance: 212
Referee: Ben Rayner

23 April 2022
15:00

(1 BP) Sheffield Tigers	22 – 41	Rotherham Titans (1 BP)

Dore Moor
Attendance: 211
Referee: Owen Taylor

23 April 2022
15:00

(1 BP) Stourbridge	31 – 24	Luctonians (1 BP)

Stourton Park
Attendance: 819
Referee: Gavin Jones

23 April 2022
15:00

(1 BP) Tynedale	27 – 24	Blaydon (2 BP)

Tynedale Park
Attendance: 572
Referee: Daniel Woods

=== Round 30 ===
30 April 2022
15:00

(1 BP) Bournville	55 – 33	Huddersfield (1 BP)

Avery Fields
Attendance: 250
Referee: Peter Buchanan

30 April 2022
15:00

(1 BP) Fylde	36 – 26	Tynedale (1 BP)

Woodlands Memorial Ground
Attendance: 1,106
Referee: James O'Brien

30 April 2022
15:00

(1 BP) Hull Ionians	47 – 19	Chester

Brantingham Park
Attendance: 252
Referee: Max Weston

30 April 2022
15:00

(1 BP) Loughborough Students	20 – 22	Blaydon (1 BP)

East Park
Attendance: 301
Referee: Katherine Richie

30 April 2022
15:00

Luctonians	24 – 7	Hull

Mortimer Park
Attendance: 355
Referee: Tom Evans-Jones

30 April 2022
15:00

(1 BP) Sedgley Park	66 – 10	Harrogate

Park Lane
Attendance: 402
Referee: Michael Harris

30 April 2022
15:00

(1 BP) Sheffield Tigers	43 – 28	Stourbridge (1 BP)

Dore Moor
Attendance: 298
Referee: Samuel Yates

30 April 2022
15:00

(1 BP) Wharfedale	38 – 19	Rotherham Titans

The Avenue
Attendance: 278
Referee: Daniel Woods

=== Rescheduled matches ===
7 May 2022
14:00

(1 BP) Rotherham Titans	36 – 12	Sheffield Tigers

Clifton Lane
Attendance: 541
Referee: Paul Caunt

7 May 2022
15:00

(1 BP) Bourneville	26 – 52	Sedgley Park (1 BP)

Avery Fields
Attendance: 220
Referee: Callum Watson

7 May 2022
15:00

Huddersfield	C – C	Stourbridge

Lockwood Park

== Attendances ==
Club	Home games	Total	Average	Highest	Lowest	% Capacity
Blaydon	15	3,457	230	682	127	9%
Bournville	15	4,116	274	500	170	N/A
Chester	15	4,605	307	670	200	15%
Fylde	15	7,916	528	1,106	192	7%
Harrogate	15	2,925	195	350	50	10%
Huddersfield	14 (Note: Huddersfield only played 14 home games as their game versus Stourbridge on 7 May 2022 was cancelled.)	3,361	240	332	196	16%
Hull	14 (Note: Hull only played 14 home games as their game versus Huddersfield on 19 February 2022 was cancelled.)	4,897	350	950	133	23%
Hull Ionians	15	4,353	290	733	120	19%
Loughborough Students	15	3,848	257	350	182	26%
Luctonians	15	6,658	444	670	316	18%
Rotherham Titans	14 (Note: Rotherham Titans only played 14 home games as their game versus Harrogote on 16 April 2022 was cancelled.)	6,384	456	594	197	18%
Sedgley Park	15	4,991	333	567	212	11%
Sheffield Tigers	15	3,604	240	298	101	24%
Stourbridge	15	6,292	419	819	244	12%
Tynedale	15	5,664	378	572	230	19%
Wharfedale	15	5,983	399	478	220	20%

== Individual statistics ==
=== Top points scorers ===
Rank	Player	Team	Points
1	Gregory Smith	Fylde	278
2	Stephen Collins	Sedgley Park	242
3	Mitchell McGahan	Bournville	222
4	Lewis Minikin	Hull Ionians	215
5	Liam Reeve	Chester	210
6	Mark Ireland	Sheffield Tigers	191
7	Michael Heaney	Stourbridge	181

=== Top try scorers ===
Rank	Player	Team	Tries
1	Matthew Gallagher	Sedgley Park	36
2	Thomas Carleton	Fylde	29
2	Daniel Rundle	Stourbridge	29
3	Michael Adlard	Hull	28
4	Thomas Grimes	Fylde	24
5	Rian Hamilton	Stourbridge	22
5	Rhys Harrison	Sedgley Park	22

== See also ==
- 2021–22 National League 1
- 2021–22 National League 2 South
