= Ian Clark (rugby union) =

English rugby union & league footballer

- Born: 1 September 1992 (age 34) Bristol, England
- Height: 1.73 m (5 ft 8 in)
- Weight: 75 kg (11 st 11 lb)

Rugby union career
- Position: Wing
- Current team: Clifton
Senior career
Years	Team	Apps	(Points)
2011–13	Gloucester	6	(15)
2011–13	Hartpury College	41	(41)
2013–14	Coventry	6	(241)
2014–15	Hartpury College	1	(20)
2015	Clifton		
- Correct as of 25 April 2015
- Rugby league career

Playing information
- Position: Wing
Club
Years	Team	Pld	T	G	FG	P
2015–16	Gloucestershire All Golds

Ian Clark (born 1 September 1992) is an English semi-professional rugby union and rugby league player who plays as a wing. A prolific try scorer during his time at Hartpury College, he has also had a number of cup appearances for Gloucester. After a spell playing rugby league Ian is currently back playing union for Clifton.

== Rugby career ==
Born in Bristol, England, Ian attended Colston's School until year 11 where his ability in school rugby union saw him progress on to Hartpury College for sixth form, helping the college win back-to-back Advanced Apprenticeship in Sporting Excellence (AASE) league titles. While at Hartpury College he was signed by Premiership side Gloucester as part of their academy and was dual registered with Hartpury College men's team, allowing him to combine league rugby with his studies. Ian would begin his adult career playing for Hartpury College in the 2011–12 National League 2 South season and he had an outstanding debut year, scoring 27 tries to become the divisions top try scorer and helping the club to 4th in the league. He also made his first team competitive debut for Gloucester in the second part of the season, making an instant impression with two tries in a 15 – 23 defeat away to London Irish in the LV Cup. The final highlight of an excellent season saw Ian head to Twickenham Stadium as part of the Hartpury College student team for the 2012 BUCS Cup. He contributed two tries in a 45 – 20 win for Hartpury over Durham.

During the summer of 2012 Ian appeared for Gloucester in the 2012 JP Morgan Premiership Sevens in which he was the competition's top scorer with 10 tries in a Gloucester side that finished as runners up. Despite his excellent scoring record at the competition he was loaned back to Hartpury College for another season in National League 2 South, helping the club to go one better than the previous season, finishing 3rd, with Ian getting 20 tries and once more being the division's top try scorer (he was the joint top scorer but played less games). He also made several appearances for Gloucester in the European Rugby Challenge Cup and LV Cup.

Although he had made several appearances for Gloucester, Ian left the club to join Coventry who were playing in National League 1 (a division higher than the league Hartpury College were in). Despite a decent try scoring record of 4 tries in just 6 appearances in the league, Ian was unable to gain a regular spot in the Coventry team and left at the end of the season, to rejoin old team Hartpury College whose student side he had helped to another BUCS cup final victory while still at Cov.

After competing in sevens rugby with Harlequins during the summer Ian switched codes to play rugby league with the Gloucestershire All Golds. After a spell in rugby league he joined Clifton based in his home town of Bristol, playing in National League 2 South for the 2015–16 season scoring a try on his debut against Redingensians.

== Rugby Union honours ==
School/University Rugby

- AASE League champions with Hartpury College (2 times): 2010, 2011
- BUCS Cup winners (2 times): 2012, 2014

Hartpury College

- National League 2 South top try scorer (27 tries): 2011–12
- National League 2 South top try scorer (20 tries): 2012–13

Gloucester

- Premiership Rugby Sevens runners up: 2012
