= 2010–11 National League 1 =

Rugby union competition in England

2010-11 National League 1
- Countries: England Cornwall
- Champions: London Scottish
- Runners-up: Barking
- Relegated: Launceston, Redruth, Otley
- Matches played: 238
- Attendance: 127,609 (average 536 per match)
- Highest attendance: 2,372 Blackheath at home to London Scottish on 30 April 2011
- Lowest attendance: 142 Barking at home to Launceston on 5 February 2011
- Top point scorer: (England) Stephen Nutt; Sedgley Park 287 points
- Top try scorer: (England) David Howells (London Scottish) (Cornwall) Ryan Westren (Launceston) 24 tries

The 2010–11 National League 1 is the second season of the third division of the English domestic rugby union competitions since the professionalised format of the second division was introduced. Coventry find themselves playing in this league following their relegation from the 2009–10 RFU Championship while teams coming up include Macclesfield (2009–10 National League 2 North), Barking and Rosslyn Park (both 2009–10 National League 2 South).

Despite losing three out of their first four games, London Scottish would go on to win the league title by winning twenty-six games on the trot and finishing ahead of newly promoted Barking. They actually trailed Barking for most of the season, with a rearranged Christmas fixture meaning that they would face the Goresbrook-based side in the final game. London Scottish won this game 17 - 13 to become the champions and seal promotion to the 2011–12 RFU Championship. At the other end of the table relegated teams included Launceston (who were unable to overcome a 20-point deduction given at the start of the season due to going into voluntary liquidation), Otley and Redruth. Launceston and Redruth would drop to the 2011–12 National League 2 South, with at least the consolation of having the Cornish derby for next season, while Otley dropped to the 2011–12 National League 2 North.

== Participating teams and locations ==
Locations of the 2010-11 National League 1 teams
Greater London National League 1 clubs

| Team | Stadium | Capacity | City/Area |
|---|---|---|---|
| Barking | Goresbrook | 1,000 | Becontree, Dagenham, London |
| Blackheath | Rectory Field | 3,500 (500 seats) | Blackheath, London |
| Blaydon | Crow Trees | 2,000 (400 seats) | Swalwell, Tyne and Wear |
| Cambridge | Grantchester Road | 2,200 (200 seats) | Cambridge, Cambridgeshire |
| Cinderford | Dockham Road | 2,500 | Cinderford, Gloucestershire |
| Coventry | Butts Park Arena | 4,000 (3,000 seats) | Coventry |
| Launceston | Polson Bridge | 3,000 | Launceston, Cornwall |
| London Scottish | Athletic Ground | 4,500 (1,000 seats) | Richmond, London |
| Macclesfield | Priory Park | 1,250 (250 seats) | Macclesfield, Cheshire |
| Otley | Cross Green | 7,000 (852 seats) | Otley, West Yorkshire |
| Redruth | The Recreation Ground | 3,500 (580 seats) | Redruth, Cornwall |
| Rosslyn Park | The Rock | 2,000 (630 seats) | Roehampton, London |
| Sedgley Park | Park Lane | 3,000 | Whitefield, Greater Manchester |
| Stourbridge | Stourton Park | 3,500 (499 seats) | Stourbridge, West Midlands |
| Tynedale | Tynedale Park | 2,000 (400 seats) | Corbridge, Northumberland |
| Wharfedale | The Avenue | 2,000 | Threshfield, Craven, North Yorkshire |

== League table ==
2010–11 National League 1 table
| Pos | Team | Pld | W | D | L | PF | PA | PD | TB | LB | Pts | Qualification |
|---|---|---|---|---|---|---|---|---|---|---|---|---|
| 1 | London Scottish (C) | 30 | 27 | 0 | 3 | 958 | 518 | +440 | 22 | 2 | 132 | Promoted |
| 2 | Barking | 30 | 27 | 1 | 2 | 818 | 461 | +357 | 15 | 1 | 126 | |
| 3 | Cambridge | 29 | 19 | 1 | 9 | 1005 | 706 | +299 | 20 | 5 | 103 | |
| 4 | Macclesfield | 30 | 17 | 2 | 11 | 904 | 711 | +193 | 18 | 5 | 95 | |
| 5 | Tynedale | 30 | 15 | 1 | 14 | 768 | 808 | −40 | 13 | 4 | 79 | |
| 6 | Blackheath | 30 | 14 | 1 | 15 | 765 | 746 | +19 | 12 | 8 | 78 | |
| 7 | Rosslyn Park | 30 | 13 | 0 | 17 | 786 | 847 | −61 | 10 | 9 | 71 | |
| 8 | Coventry | 30 | 12 | 1 | 17 | 774 | 828 | −54 | 13 | 6 | 69 | |
| 9 | Stourbridge | 30 | 13 | 0 | 17 | 662 | 792 | −130 | 10 | 4 | 66 | |
| 10 | Blaydon | 30 | 11 | 0 | 19 | 679 | 792 | −113 | 11 | 11 | 66 | |
| 11 | Sedgley Park | 30 | 13 | 1 | 16 | 624 | 878 | −254 | 8 | 3 | 65 | |
| 12 | Cinderford (Note: Cinderford had two home games cancelled.) | 28 | 12 | 0 | 16 | 614 | 703 | −89 | 8 | 7 | 63 | |
| 13 | Wharfedale | 29 | 11 | 1 | 17 | 608 | 752 | −144 | 10 | 7 | 63 | |
| 14 | Redruth (R) | 30 | 12 | 2 | 16 | 633 | 788 | −155 | 6 | 4 | 62 | Relegated |
| 15 | Otley (R) | 30 | 6 | 0 | 24 | 601 | 829 | −228 | 10 | 11 | 45 | Relegated |
| 16 | Launceston (R) | 30 | 10 | 1 | 19 | 702 | 742 | −40 | 13 | 9 | 44 (Note: Launceston deducted 20 points at start of season due to going into voluntary liquidation.) | Relegated |

Updated to match(es) played on 30 May 2011. Source: "National One 10/11 League table". Rugby Statbunker.
Rules for classification: If teams are level at any stage, tiebreakers are applied in the following order:
1. Number of matches won
2. Difference between points for and against
3. Total number of points for
4. Aggregate number of points scored in matches between tied teams
5. Number of matches won excluding the first match, then the second and so on until the tie is settled
  (C) Champion; (R) Relegated
  Notes:

== Results ==
=== Round 1 ===
4 September 2010
15:00

| (BP) Barking | 34 - 7 | Cinderford |
| | Report |

Goresbrook
Attendance: 165
Referee: Dale Newitt

4 September 2010

| (BP) London Scottish | 13 - 20 | Blackheath |
| | Report |

Richmond Athletic Ground
Attendance: 1,250
Referee: Michael Tutty

4 September 2010

| (BP) Otley | 22 - 25 | Blaydon |
| | Report |

Cross Green
Attendance: 391
Referee: John Meredith

4 September 2010

| (BP) Redruth | 15 - 16 | Wharfedale |
| | Report |

The Recreation Ground
Attendance: 810
Referee: Philip Davis

4 September 2010

| Rosslyn Park | 26 - 18 | Launceston |
| | Report |

The Rock
Attendance: 580
Referee: Greg MacDonald

4 September 2010

| (BP) Sedgley Park | 28 - 43 | Cambridge (BP) |
| | Report |

Park Lane
Attendance: 747
Referee: Ian Tempest

4 September 2010

| (BP) Stourbridge | 19 - 22 | Macclesfield |
| | Report |

Stourton Park
Attendance: 450
Referee: Paul Knowles

4 September 2010

| (BP) Tynedale | 45 - 20 | Coventry |
| | Report |

Tynedale Park
Attendance: 510
Referee: Steve Lee

=== Round 2 ===
11 September 2010

| (BP) Blackheath | 34 - 17 | Rosslyn Park |
| | Report |

Rectory Field
Attendance: 795
Referee: J Matthews

11 September 2010

| (BP) Blaydon | 19 - 20 | Tynedale |
| | Report |

Crow Trees
Attendance: 1,324
Referee: Chris Sharp

11 September 2010

| (BP) Cambridge | 60 - 12 | Cinderford |
| | Report |

Grantchester Road
Attendance: 450
Referee: Darryl Chapman

11 September 2010

| (BP) Coventry | 45 - 32 | Stourbridge (BP) |
| | Report |

Butts Park Arena
Attendance: 952
Referee: Greg MacDonald

11 September 2010

| (BP) Launceston | 40 - 15 | Redruth |
| | Report |

Polson Bridge
Attendance: 1,143
Referee: Terry Hall

11 September 2010
15:00

| (BP) London Scottish | 17 - 24 | Barking |
| | Report |

Richmond Athletic Ground
Attendance: 655
Referee: Simon Harding

11 September 2010

| (BP) Macclesfield | 21 - 23 | Sedgley Park |
| | Report |

Priory Park
Attendance: 397
Referee: Dale Newitt

11 September 2010

| Wharfedale | 17 - 13 | Otley (BP) |
| | Report |

The Avenue
Attendance: 777
Referee: Ian Tempest

=== Round 3 ===
18 September 2010
15:00

| Barking | 28 - 16 | Cambridge |
| | Report |

Goresbrook
Attendance: 360
Referee: Keith Lewis

18 September 2010

| Cinderford (BP) | 54 - 36 | Macclesfield (BP) |
| | Report |

Dockham Road
Attendance: 400
Referee: Ross Campbell

18 September 2010

| Otley | 28 - 25 | Launceston (2BP) |
| | Report |

Cross Green
Attendance: 317
Referee: Chris Sharp

18 September 2010

| Redruth | 17 - 28 | Blackheath (BP) |
| | Report |

The Recreation Ground
Attendance: 858
Referee: Dale Newitt

18 September 2010

| (BP) Rosslyn Park | 37 - 16 | London Scottish |
| | Report |

The Rock
Attendance: 840
Referee: Terry Hall

18 September 2010

| Sedgley Park | 30 - 20 | Coventry |
| | Report |

Park Lane
Attendance: 270
Referee: Andrew Jackson

18 September 2010

| Stourbridge | 20 - 18 | Blaydon (BP) |
| | Report |

Stourton Park
Attendance: 400
Referee: Richard Kelly

18 September 2010

| (BP) Tynedale | 36 - 12 | Wharfedale |
| | Report |

Tynedale Park
Attendance: 580
Referee: Marcus Caton

=== Round 4 ===
25 September 2010

| (BP) Blackheath | 55-26 | Otley (BP) |
| | Report |

Rectory Field
Attendance: 1,243
Referee: Paul Knowles

25 September 2010

| Blaydon | 23 - 16 | Sedgley Park (BP) |
| | Report |

Crow Trees
Attendance: 147
Referee: Andrew Vertigan

25 September 2010

| (BP) Coventry | 55 - 5 | Cinderford |
| | Report |

Butts Park Arena
Attendance: 905
Referee: Keith Lewis

25 September 2010

| Launceston | 24 - 24 | Tynedale |
| | Report |

Polson Bridge
Attendance: 579
Referee: Philip Davis

25 September 2010

| (BP) London Scottish | 34 - 15 | Redruth |
| | Report |

Richmond Athletic Ground
Attendance: 650
Referee: Chris Sharp

25 September 2010

| Macclesfield | 26 - 26 | Cambridge (BP) |
| | Report |

Priory Park
Attendance: 375
Referee: Andrew Jackson

25 September 2010
15:00

| Rosslyn Park | 19 - 31 | Barking (BP) |
| | Report |

The Rock
Attendance: 710
Referee: Marcus Caton

25 September 2010

| Wharfedale | 33 - 22 | Stourbridge |
| | Report |

The Avenue
Attendance: 589
Referee: John Meredith

=== Round 5 ===
2 October 2010
15:00

| Barking | 10 - 6 | Macclesfield (BP) |
| | Report |

Goresbrook
Attendance: 250
Referee: Rowan Kitt

2 October 2010

| Cinderford | 33 - 26 | Blaydon (BP) |
| | Report |

Dockham Road
Attendance: 190
Referee: Ian Tempest

2 October 2010

| (BP) Cambridge | 43 - 22 | Coventry |
| | Report |

Grantchester Road
Attendance: 650

2 October 2010

| Otley | 22 - 34 | London Scottish (BP) |
| | Report |

Cross Green
Attendance: 386
Referee: Greg MacDonald

2 October 2010

| Redruth | 26 - 24 | Rosslyn Park (BP) |
| | Report |

The Recreation Ground
Attendance: 798
Referee: Richard Kelly

2 October 2010

| Sedgley Park | 19 - 27 | Wharfedale |
| | Report |

Park Lane
Attendance: 327
Referee: Darren Gamage

2 October 2010

| Stourbridge | 17 - 10 | Launceston (BP) |
| | Report |

Stourton Park
Attendance: 475
Referee: Dale Newitt

2 October 2010

| Tynedale | 22 - 19 | Blackheath (BP) |
| | Report |

Tynedale Park
Attendance: 682
Referee: Andrew Taylorson

=== Round 6 ===
9 October 2010
14:30

| Redruth | 20 - 20 | Barking |
| | Report |

The Recreation Ground
Attendance: 813
Referee: Ross Campbell

9 October 2010

| (2BP) Blaydon | 30 - 35 | Cambridge (BP) |
| | Report |

Crow Trees
Attendance: 203
Referee: Chris Sharp

9 October 2010

| (2BP) Blackheath | 31 - 33 | Stourbridge (BP) |
| | Report |

Rectory Field
Attendance: 727
Referee: Darren Gamage

9 October 2010

| Coventry | 12 - 40 | Macclesfield (BP) |
| | Report |

Butts Park Arena
Attendance: 1,022
Referee: Ian Tempest

9 October 2010

| (BP) Launceston | 46 - 24 | Sedgley Park |
| | Report |

Polson Bridge
Attendance: 504
Referee: Simon Harding

9 October 2010

| (BP) London Scottish | 34 - 33 | Tynedale (2BP) |
| | Report |

Richmond Athletic Ground
Attendance: 725
Referee: Rowan Kitt

9 October 2010

| Rosslyn Park | 17 - 15 | Otley (BP) |
| | Report |

The Rock
Attendance: 720
Referee: Cemmy Rudkin

9 October 2010

| (BP) Wharfedale | 17 - 19 | Cinderford |
| | Report |

The Avenue
Attendance: 438
Referee: Matt Carley

=== Round 7 ===
16 October 2010
14:30

| (BP) Otley | 25 - 14 | Redruth |
| | Report |

Cross Green
Attendance: 427
Referee: Richard Kelly

16 October 2010
15:00

| Barking | 21 - 15 | Coventry (BP) |
| | Report |

Goresbrook
Attendance: 150
Referee: Terry Hall

16 October 2010

| (BP) Cambridge | 41 - 11 | Wharfedale |
| | Report |

Grantchester Road
Attendance: 490
Referee: John Meredith

16 October 2010

| Cinderford | 14 - 24 | Launceston |
| | Report |

Dockham Road
Attendance: 310
Referee: Steve Lee

16 October 2010

| (BP) Macclesfield | 33 - 0 | Blaydon |
| | Report |

Priory Park
Attendance: 321
Referee: Philip Davis

16 October 2010

| Sedgley Park | 18 - 27 | Blackheath |
| | Report |

Park Lane
Attendance: 382
Referee: Dale Newitt

16 October 2010

| (BP) Stourbridge | 9 - 17 | London Scottish |
| | Report |

Stourton Park
Attendance: 550
Referee: Ian Tempest

16 October 2010

| Tynedale | 24 - 33 | Rosslyn Park (BP) |
| | Report |

Tynedale Park
Attendance: 585
Referee: Marcus Caton

=== Round 8 ===
23 October 2010
15:00

| (BP) Blackheath | 48 - 35 | Cinderford (BP) |
| | Report |

Rectory Field
Attendance: 817
Referee: Michael Tutty

23 October 2010
15:00

| (BP) Blaydon | 29 - 28 | Coventry (BP) |
| | Report |

Crow Trees
Attendance: 217
Referee: John Meredith

23 October 2010
15:00

| (BP) Launceston | 20 - 21 | Cambridge |
| | Report |

Polson Bridge
Attendance: 655
Referee: Greg MacDonald

23 October 2010
15:00

| (BP) London Scottish | 43 - 18 | Sedgley Park |
| | Report |

Richmond Athletic Ground
Attendance: 680
Referee: Simon Harding

23 October 2010
15:00

| (BP) Otley | 24 - 41 | Barking (BP) |
| | Report |

Cross Green
Attendance: 422
Referee: Philip Davis

23 October 2010
15:00

| (BP) Redruth | 27 - 22 | Tynedale (BP) |
| | Report |

The Recreation Ground
Attendance: 805
Referee: Terry Hall

23 October 2010
15:00

| Rosslyn Park | 23 - 32 | Stourbridge (BP) |
| | Report |

The Rock
Attendance: 414
Referee: Matt Carley

23 October 2010
15:00

| (BP) Wharfedale | 43 - 24 | Macclesfield (BP) |
| | Report |

The Avenue
Attendance: 502
Referee: Nick Cockburn

=== Round 9 ===
30 October 2010
15:00

| Barking | 21 - 20 | Blaydon (BP) |
| | Report |

Goresbrook
Attendance: 280
Referee: Keith Lewis

30 October 2010
15:00

| (BP) Cambridge | 40 - 31 | Blackheath (BP) |
| | Report |

Grantchester Road
Attendance: 727
Referee: Chris Sharp

30 October 2010
15:00

| (BP) Cinderford | 22 - 25 | London Scottish (BP) |
| | Report |

Dockham Road
Attendance: 230
Referee: Andrew Vertigan

30 October 2010
15:00

| (BP) Coventry | 37 - 29 | Wharfedale (BP) |
| | Report |

Butts Park Arena
Attendance: 890
Referee: Richard Kelly

30 October 2010
15:00

| (BP) Macclesfield | 36 - 7 | Launceston |
| | Report |

Priory Park
Attendance: 370
Referee: Andrew Jackson

30 October 2010
15:00

| (BP) Stourbridge | 36 - 16 | Redruth |
| | Report |

Stourton Park
Attendance: 500
Referee: Marcus Caton

30 October 2010
15:00

| Sedgley Park | 25 - 24 | Rosslyn Park (2BP) |
| | Report |

Park Lane
Attendance: 247
Referee: Nick Cockburn

30 October 2010
15:00

| Tynedale | 25 - 18 | Otley (BP) |
| | Report |

Tynedale Park
Attendance: 580
Referee: Karl Kirkpatrick

=== Round 10 ===
6 November 2010
12:30

| (BP) London Scottish | 37 - 17 | Cambridge |
| | Report |

Richmond Athletic Ground
Attendance: 575
Referee: Paul Knowles

6 November 2010
13:00

| (BP) Rosslyn Park | 26 - 24 | Cinderford (2BP) |
| | Report |

The Rock
Attendance: 237
Referee: Philip Davis

6 November 2010
14:00

| (BP) Wharfedale | 13 - 15 | Blaydon |
| | Report |

The Avenue
Attendance: 432
Referee: Andrew Vertigan

6 November 2010
14:15

| (BP) Otley | 16 - 21 | Stourbridge |
| | Report |

Cross Green
Attendance: 321
Referee: Chris Sharp

6 November 2010
14:30

| Launceston | 23 - 36 | Coventry (BP) |
| | Report |

Polson Bridge
Attendance: 595
Referee: Matt Carley

6 November 2010
14:30

| Redruth | 10 - 24 | Sedgley Park |
| | Report |

The Recreation Ground
Attendance: 795
Referee: Greg MacDonald

6 November 2010
15:00

| (BP) Blackheath | 24 - 25 | Macclesfield |
| | Report |

Rectory Field
Attendance: 824
Referee: Ross Campbell

6 November 2010
15:00

| Tynedale | 17 - 41 | Barking (BP) |
| | Report |

Tynedale Park
Attendance: 535
Referee: Ian Tempest

=== Round 11 ===
13 November 2010
14:00

| (BP) Cambridge | 29 - 27 | Rosslyn Park (BP) |
| | Report |

Grantchester Road
Attendance: 420
Referee: Rowan Kitt

13 November 2010
14:15

| (BP) Barking | 31 - 6 | Wharfedale |
| | Report |

Goresbrook
Attendance: 165
Referee: Dale Newitt

13 November 2010
14:15

| (BP) Blaydon | 29 - 24 | Launceston (BP) |
| | Report |

Crow Trees
Attendance: 192
Referee: Steve Lee

13 November 2010
14:30

| (BP) Cinderford | 17 - 18 | Redruth |
| | Report |

Dockham Road
Attendance: 205
Referee: Matt Carley

13 November 2010
14:30

| (BP) Sedgley Park | 28 - 3 | Otley |
| | Report |

Park Lane
Attendance: 513
Referee: Marcus Caton

13 November 2010
15:00

| Coventry | 17 - 16 | Blackheath (BP) |
| | Report |

Butts Park Arena
Attendance: 1,541
Referee: Andrew Jackson

13 November 2010
15:00

| (BP) Macclesfield | 25 - 31 | London Scottish (BP) |
| | Report |

Priory Park
Attendance: 327
Referee: Greg MacDonald

13 November 2010
15:00

| Stourbridge | 25 - 6 | Tynedale |
| | Report |

Stourton Park
Attendance: 525
Referee: Ross Campbell

=== Round 12 ===
20 November 2010
14:00

| Tynedale | 17 - 10 | Sedgley Park (BP) |
| | Report |

Tynedale Park
Attendance: 420
Referee: John Meredith

20 November 2010
14:15

| Otley | 18 - 10 | Cinderford |
| | Report |

Cross Green
Attendance: 429
Referee: Philip Davis

20 November 2010
14:15

| Stourbridge | 8 - 33 | Barking (BP) |
| | Report |

Stourton Park
Attendance: 500
Referee: Rowan Kitt

20 November 2010
14:30

| Blackheath | 21 - 32 | Blaydon (BP) |
| | Report |

Rectory Field
Attendance: 670
Referee: Richard Kelly

20 November 2010
14:30

| (BP) Launceston | 30 - 20 | Wharfedale |
| | Report |

Polson Bridge
Attendance: 598
Referee: Michael Tutty

20 November 2010
14:30

| (BP) Redruth | 22 - 30 | Cambridge (BP) |
| | Report |

The Recreation Ground
Attendance: 840
Referee: Ross Campbell

20 November 2010
14:30

| Rosslyn Park | 25 - 44 | Macclesfield (BP) |
| | Report |

The Rock
Attendance: 582
Referee: Keith Lewis

20 November 2010
15:00

| (BP) London Scottish | 30 - 15 | Coventry |
| | Report |

Richmond Athletic Ground
Attendance: 495
Referee: Ian Tempest

=== Round 13 ===
27 November 2011
14:00

| (BP) Cambridge | 66 - 29 | Otley (BP) |
| | Report |

Grantchester Road
Attendance: 320
Referee: Michael Tutty

27 November 2011

| Barking | P - P | Launceston |

- Postponed. Game rescheduled for 5 February 2011.

27 November 2011

| Blaydon | P - P | London Scottish |

- Postponed. Game rescheduled for 5 February 2011.

27 November 2011

| Cinderford | P - P | Tynedale |

- Postponed. Game rescheduled for 5 February 2011.

27 November 2011

| Coventry | P - P | Rosslyn Park |

- Postponed. Game rescheduled for 5 February 2011.

27 November 2011

| Macclesfield | P - P | Redruth |

- Postponed. Game rescheduled for 5 February 2011.

27 November 2011

| Sedgley Park | P - P | Stourbridge |

- Postponed. Game rescheduled for 5 February 2011.

27 November 2011

| Wharfedale | P - P | Blackheath |

- Postponed. Game rescheduled for 5 February 2011.

=== Round 14 ===
4 December 2012

| Blackheath | P - P | Launceston |

- Postponed. Game rescheduled for 26 February 2011.

4 December 2012

| London Scottish | P - P | Wharfedale |

- Postponed. Game rescheduled for 26 February 2011.

4 December 2012

| Otley | P - P | Macclesfield |

- Postponed. Game rescheduled for 26 February 2011.

4 December 2012

| Redruth | P - P | Coventry |

- Postponed. Game rescheduled for 26 February 2011.

4 December 2012

| Rosslyn Park | P - P | Blaydon |

- Postponed. Game rescheduled for 26 February 2011.

4 December 2012

| Sedgley Park | P - P | Barking |

- Postponed. Game rescheduled for 26 February 2011.

4 December 2012

| Stourbridge | P - P | Cinderford |

- Postponed. Game rescheduled for 26 February 2011.

4 December 2012

| Tynedale | P - P | Cambridge |

- Postponed. Game rescheduled for 26 February 2011.

=== Round 15 ===
11 December 2010
14:00

| (BP) Cambridge | 23 - 27 | Stourbridge |
| | Report |

Grantchester Road
Attendance: 360
Referee: John Meredith

11 December 2010
14:00

| (BP) Wharfedale | 23 - 30 | Rosslyn Park |
| | Report |

The Avenue
Attendance: 407
Referee: Andrew Taylorson

11 December 2010
14:15

| (BP) Barking | 34 - 22 | Blackheath |
| | Report |

Goresbrook
Attendance: 165
Referee: Darren Gamage

11 December 2010
14:30

| Launceston | 12 - 23 | London Scottish |
| | Report |

Polson Bridge
Attendance: 644
Referee: Marcus Caton

11 December 2010
15:00

| Coventry | 18 - 10 | Otley |
| | Report |

Butts Park Arena
Attendance: 750
Referee: Chris Sharp

11 December 2010
15:00

| (BP) Macclesfield | 34 - 10 | Tynedale |
| | Report |

Priory Park
Attendance: 368
Referee: Simon Harding

11 December 2010

| Blaydon | P - P | Redruth |

- Postponed. Game rescheduled for 19 March 2011.

11 December 2010

| Cinderford | P - P | Sedgley Park |

- Postponed. Game rescheduled for 19 March 2011.

=== Round 16 ===
18 December 2010
14:00

| Redruth | 26 - 0 | Launceston |
| | Report |

The Recreation Ground
Attendance: 1,627
Referee: Nick Williams

18 December 2010

| Barking | P - P | London Scottish |

- Postponed. Game rescheduled for 7 May 2011.

18 December 2010

| Cinderford | P - P | Cambridge |

- Postponed. Game rescheduled for 7 May 2011.

18 December 2010

| Otley | P - P | Wharfedale |

- Postponed. Game rescheduled for 19 March 2011.

18 December 2010

| Rosslyn Park | P - P | Blackheath |

- Postponed. Game rescheduled for 19 March 2011.

18 December 2010

| Stourbridge | P - P | Coventry |

- Postponed. Game rescheduled for 19 March 2011.

18 December 2010

| Sedgley Park | P - P | Macclesfield |

- Postponed. Game rescheduled for 7 May 2011.

18 December 2010

| Tynedale | P - P | Blaydon |

- Postponed. Game rescheduled for 2 May 2011.

=== Round 17 ===
8 January 2011
14:00

| (BP) Wharfedale | 27 - 10 | Tynedale |
| | Report |

The Avenue
Attendance: 487
Referee: Rowan Kitt

8 January 2011
14:15

| (BP) Blaydon | 31 - 10 | Stourbridge |
| | Report |

Crow Trees
Attendance: 220
Referee: Chris Sharp

8 January 2011
14:15

| (BP) Cambridge | 14 - 21 | Barking |
| | Report |

Grantchester Road
Attendance: 650
Referee: Greg MacDonald

8 January 2011
14:30

| Launceston | 25 - 15 | Otley |
| | Report |

Polson Bridge
Attendance: 726
Referee: Simon Harding

8 January 2011
15:00

| (BP) Blackheath | 14 - 18 | Redruth |
| | Report |

Rectory Field
Attendance: 787
Referee: Matt Carley

8 January 2011
15:00

| (BP) Coventry | 25 - 19 | Sedgley Park (BP) |
| | Report |

Butts Park Arena
Attendance: 701
Referee: John Meredith

8 January 2011
15:00

| London Scottish | 34 - 23 | Rosslyn Park |
| | Report |

Richmond Athletic Ground
Attendance: 1,878
Referee: Ross Campbell

8 January 2011
15:00

| (BP) Macclesfield | 27 - 10 | Cinderford |
| | Report |

Priory Park
Attendance: 394
Referee: Andrew Taylorson

=== Round 18 ===
15 January 2011
14:00

| (BP) Cambridge | 45 - 37 | Macclesfield (2BP) |
| | Report |

Grantchester Road
Attendance: 390
Referee: Andrew Jackson

15 January 2011
14:00

| (BP) Redruth | 15 - 21 | London Scottish |
| | Report |

The Recreation Ground
Attendance: 775
Referee: Philip Davis

15 January 2011
14:00

| (BP) Tynedale | 26 - 0 | Launceston |
| | Report |

Tynedale Park
Attendance: 348
Referee: Andrew Vertigan

15 January 2011
14:15

| Otley | 18 - 17 | Blackheath (BP) |
| | Report |

Cross Green
Attendance: 380
Referee: Marcus Caton

15 January 2011
14:30

| Cinderford | 26 - 0 | Coventry |
| | Report |

Dockham Road
Attendance: 265
Referee: Paul Knowles

15 January 2011
14:30

| Sedgley Park | 17 - 0 | Blaydon |
| | Report |

Park Lane
Attendance: 247
Referee: Steve Lee

15 January 2011
15:00

| Barking | 20 - 18 | Rosslyn Park (BP) |
| | Report |

Goresbrook
Attendance: 150
Referee: Keith Lewis

15 January 2011
15:00

| Stourbridge | 15 - 30 | Wharfedale (BP) |
| | Report |

Stourton Park
Attendance: 500
Referee: John Meredith

=== Round 19 ===
22 January 2011
14:15

| (BP) Blaydon | 17 - 20 | Cinderford |
| | Report |

Crow Trees
Attendance: 158
Referee: Darren Gamage

22 January 2011
14:30

| (BP) Rosslyn Park | 36 - 23 | Redruth |
| | Report |

The Rock
Attendance: 450
Referee: Terry Hall

22 January 2011
15:00

| Blackheath | 25 - 18 | Tynedale (BP) |
| | Report |

Rectory Field
Attendance: 626
Referee: Simon Harding

22 January 2011
15:00

| Coventry | 14 - 26 | Cambridge (BP) |
| | Report |

Butts Park Arena
Attendance: 432
Referee: Andrew Vertigan

22 January 2011
15:00

| (BP) London Scottish | 38 - 22 | Otley |
| | Report |

Richmond Athletic Ground
Attendance: 565
Referee: Greg MacDonald

22 January 2011

| Macclesfield | P - P | Barking |

- Postponed. Game rescheduled to 14 May 2011.

22 January 2011

| Launceston | P - P | Stourbridge |

- Postponed. Game rescheduled to 7 May 2011.

22 January 2011

| Wharfedale | P - P | Sedgley Park |

- Postponed. Game rescheduled to 12 April 2011.

=== Round 20 ===
29 January 2011
14:00

| (BP) Cambridge | 45 - 7 | Blaydon |
| | Report |

Grantchester Road
Attendance: 300
Referee: Matt Carley

29 January 2011
14:15

| (BP) Otley | 12 - 16 | Rosslyn Park |
| | Report |

Cross Green
Attendance: 468
Referee: Philip Davis

29 January 2011
14:30

| Sedgley Park | 18 - 17 | Launceston (BP) |
| | Report |

Park Lane
Attendance: 396
Referee: Andrew Jackson

29 January 2011
15:00

| (BP) Barking | 30 - 5 | Redruth |
| | Report |

Goresbrook
Attendance: 158
Referee: Paul Knowles

29 January 2011
15:00

| (BP) Stourbridge | 36 - 16 | Blackheath |
| | Report |

Stourton Park
Attendance: 450
Referee: Greg MacDonald

29 January 2011
15:00

| Tynedale | 15 - 31 | London Scottish (BP) |
| | Report |

Tynedale Park
Attendance: 542
Referee: John Meredith

29 January 2011

| Cinderford | P - P | Wharfedale |

- Postponed. Game rescheduled to 21 May 2011.

30 January 2011
15:00

| (BP) Macclesfield | 37 - 21 | Coventry |
| | Report |

Priory Park
Attendance: 327
Referee: Dale Newitt

=== Round 13 (Rescheduled games) ===
5 February 2011
14:00

| (BP) Wharfedale | 14 - 21 | Blackheath |
| | Report |

The Avenue
Attendance: 445
Referee: Ian Tempest

- Rescheduled from 27 November 2010.

5 February 2011
14:15

| (BP) Barking | 27 - 16 | Launceston |
| | Report |

Goresbrook
Attendance: 142
Referee: Paul Knowles

- Rescheduled from 27 November 2010.

5 February 2011
14:15

| Blaydon | 3 - 40 | London Scottish (BP) |
| | Report |

Crow Trees
Attendance: 157
Referee: Marcus Caton

- Rescheduled from 27 November 2010.

5 February 2011
14:30

| (BP) Cinderford | 32 - 5 | Tynedale |
| | Report |

Dockham Road
Attendance: 215
Referee: Michael Tutty

- Rescheduled from 27 November 2010.

5 February 2011
14:30

| Sedgley Park | 19 - 14 | Stourbridge (BP) |
| | Report |

Park Lane
Attendance: 239
Referee: Andrew Vertigan

- Rescheduled from 27 November 2010.

5 February 2011
15:00

| (2BP) Coventry | 27 - 34 | Rosslyn Park |
| | Report |

Butts Park Arena
Attendance: 621
Referee: Chris Sharp

- Rescheduled from 27 November 2010.

5 February 2011
15:00

| (BP) Macclesfield | 17 - 19 | Redruth |
| | Report |

Priory Park
Attendance: 279
Referee: Greg MacDonald

- Rescheduled from 27 November 2010.

=== Round 21 ===
12 February 2011
14:00

| (BP) Wharfedale | 31 - 28 | Cambridge (2BP) |
| | Report |

The Avenue
Attendance: 450
Referee: Nick Cockburn

12 February 2011
14:15

| Blaydon | 20 - 39 | Macclesfield (BP) |
| | Report |

Crow Trees
Attendance: 192
Referee: John Meredith

12 February 2011
14:15

| (BP) Coventry | 18 - 19 | Barking |
| | Report |

Butts Park Arena
Attendance: 516
Referee: Cemmy Rudkin

12 February 2011
14:30

| (BP) Launceston | 22 - 18 | Cinderford (BP) |
| | Report |

Polson Bridge
Attendance: 622
Referee: Marcus Caton

12 February 2011
14:30

| (BP) Redruth | 34 - 25 | Otley (BP) |
| | Report |

The Recreation Ground
Attendance: 750
Referee: Simon Harding

12 February 2011
14:30

| (BP) Rosslyn Park | 41 - 38 | Tynedale (2BP) |
| | Report |

The Rock
Attendance: 435
Referee: Greg MacDonald

12 February 2011
15:00

| (BP) Blackheath | 25 - 9 | Sedgley Park |
| | Report |

Rectory Field
Attendance: 523
Referee: Ross Campbell

12 February 2011
15:00

| (BP) London Scottish | 55 - 13 | Stourbridge |
| | Report |

Richmond Athletic Ground
Attendance: 535
Referee: Richard Kelly

=== Round 22 ===
19 February 2011
14:00

| Cambridge | 24 - 15 | Launceston |
| | Report |

Grantchester Road
Attendance: 380
Referee: Steve Lee

19 February 2011
14:00

| (BP) Tynedale | 31 - 26 | Redruth (BP) |
| | Report |

Tynedale Park
Attendance: 336
Referee: Andrew Vertigan

19 February 2011
14:30

| Cinderford | 18 - 17 | Blackheath (BP) |
| | Report |

Dockham Road
Attendance: 270
Referee: Rowan Kitt

19 February 2011
14:30

| Sedgley Park | 5 - 41 | London Scottish (BP) |
| | Report |

Park Lane
Attendance: 1,022
Referee: Simon Harding

19 February 2011
15:00

| Barking | 13 - 3 | Otley |
| | Report |

Goresbrook
Attendance: 250
Referee: Keith Lewis

19 February 2011
15:00

| Coventry | 23 - 10 | Blaydon |
| | Report |

Butts Park Arena
Attendance: 803
Referee: Richard Kelly

19 February 2011
15:00

| (BP) Macclesfield | 53 - 12 | Wharfedale |
| | Report |

Priory Park
Attendance: 410
Referee: Nick Cockburn

19 February 2011
15:00

| (BP) Stourbridge | 27 - 22 | Rosslyn Park (BP) |
| | Report |

Stourton Park
Attendance: 400
Referee: Andrew Jackson

=== Round 14 (Rescheduled games) ===
26 February 2011
14:00

| (BP) Rosslyn Park | 28 - 22 | Blaydon (2BP) |
| | Report |

The Rock
Attendance: 436
Referee: Philip Davis

- Rescheduled from 4 December 2010.

26 February 2011
14:00

| (BP) Tynedale | 29 - 17 | Cambridge |
| | Report |

Tynedale Park
Attendance: 372
Referee: J Matthews

- Rescheduled from 4 December 2010.

26 February 2011
14:15

| (BP) Otley | 27 - 19 | Macclesfield |
| | Report |

Cross Green
Attendance: 417
Referee: Marcus Caton

- Rescheduled from 4 December 2010.

26 February 2011
14:30

| (BP) Redruth | 31 - 43 | Coventry (BP) |
| | Report |

The Recreation Ground
Attendance: 810
Referee: Andrew Jackson

- Rescheduled from 4 December 2010.

26 February 2011
14:30

| Sedgley Park | 3 - 24 | Barking (BP) |
| | Report |

Park Lane
Attendance: 176
Referee: Steve Lee

- Rescheduled from 4 December 2010.

26 February 2011
15:00

| (BP) Blackheath | 33 - 31 | Launceston (2BP) |
| | Report |

Rectory Field
Attendance: 457
Referee: Nick Cousins

- Rescheduled from 4 December 2010.

26 February 2011
15:00

| London Scottish | 27 - 3 | Wharfedale |
| | Report |

Richmond Athletic Ground
Attendance: 444
Referee: Rowan Kitt

- Rescheduled from 4 December 2010.

26 February 2011
15:00

| Stourbridge | 0 - 11 | Cinderford |
| | Report |

Stourton Park
Attendance: 400
Referee: Keith Lewis

- Rescheduled from 4 December 2010.

=== Round 23 ===
5 March 2011
14:15

| Otley | 24 - 38 | Tynedale (BP) |
| | Report |

Cross Green
Attendance: 367
Referee: Steve Lee

5 March 2011
14:30

| (2BP) Launceston | 27 - 29 | Macclesfield (BP) |
| | Report |

Polson Bridge
Attendance: 623
Referee: Marcus Caton

5 March 2011
14:30

| (2BP) Rosslyn Park | 22 - 23 | Sedgley Park |
| | Report |

The Rock
Attendance: 522
Referee: Michael Tutty

5 March 2011
15:00

| (BP) Blackheath | 31 - 25 | Cambridge (BP) |
| | Report |

Rectory Field
Attendance: 854
Referee: Ian Tempest

5 March 2011
15:00

| (BP) Blaydon | 20 - 23 | Barking |
| | Report |

Crow Trees
Attendance: 197
Referee: Andrew Taylorson

5 March 2011
15:00

| (BP) London Scottish | 29 - 11 | Cinderford |
| | Report |

Richmond Athletic Ground
Attendance: 748
Referee: Terry Hall

5 March 2011
15:00

| Redruth | 36 - 32 | Stourbridge (2BP) |
| | Report |

The Recreation Ground
Attendance: 1,208
Referee: Philip Davis

5 March 2011
15:00

| (BP) Wharfedale | 37 - 32 | Coventry (2BP) |
| | Report |

The Avenue
Attendance: 560
Referee: John Meredith

=== Round 24 ===
12 March 2011
14:00

| (BP) Barking | 41 - 12 | Tynedale |
| | Report |

Goresbrook
Attendance: 189
Referee: Simon Harding

12 March 2011
14:30

| (BP) Cinderford | 26 - 21 | Rosslyn Park (BP) |
| | Report |

Dockham Road
Attendance: 230
Referee: Matt Carley

12 March 2011
15:00

| Cambridge | 12 - 27 | London Scottish (BP) |
| | Report |

Grantchester Road
Attendance: 750
Referee: Ross Campbell

12 March 2011
14:30

| (BP) Sedgley Park | 34 - 24 | Redruth |
| | Report |

Park Lane
Attendance: 311
Referee: Darren Gamage

12 March 2011
15:00

| (BP) Blaydon | 20 - 27 | Wharfedale (BP) |
| | Report |

Crow Trees
Attendance: 440
Referee: Johan van Merwe

12 March 2011
15:00

| Coventry | 25 - 34 | Launceston (BP) |
| | Report |

Butts Park Arena
Attendance: 798
Referee: Greg MacDonald

12 March 2011
15:00

| (BP) Macclesfield | 44 - 17 | Blackheath |
| | Report |

Priory Park
Attendance: 371
Referee: John Meredith

12 March 2011
15:00

| Stourbridge | 21 - 19 | Otley (BP) |
| | Report |

Stourton Park
Attendance: 450
Referee: Terry Hall

=== Rounds 15 & 16 (Rescheduled games) ===
19 March 2011
14:00

| (BP) Blaydon | 35 - 34 | Redruth (2BP) |
| | Report |

Crow Trees
Attendance: 158

- Rescheduled from 11 December 2010.

19 March 2011
14:00

| (BP) Cinderford | 36 - 11 | Sedgley Park |
| | Report |

Dockham Road
Attendance: 253
Referee: Andrew Small

- Rescheduled from 11 December 2010.

19 March 2011
14:00

| (BP) Otley | 31 - 14 | Wharfedale |
| | Report |

Cross Green
Attendance: 893

- Rescheduled from 18 December 2010.

19 March 2011
15:00

| (BP) Rosslyn Park | 20 - 25 | Blackheath |
| | Report |

The Rock
Attendance: 415

- Rescheduled from 18 December 2010.

19 March 2011
15:00

| (BP) Stourbridge | 25 - 27 | Coventry |
| | Report |

Stourton Park
Attendance: 450
Referee: Matt Carley

- Rescheduled from 18 December 2010.

=== Round 25 ===
26 March 2011
14:15

| (2BP) Otley | 32 - 33 | Sedgley Park (BP) |
| | Report |

Cross Green
Attendance: 473
Referee: Ross Campbell

26 March 2011
14:30

| (BP) Launceston | 36 - 17 | Blaydon |
| | Report |

Polson Bridge
Attendance: 564

26 March 2011
15:00

| (BP) Blackheath | 27 - 27 | Coventry (BP) |
| | Report |

Rectory Field
Attendance: 621
Referee: Rowan Kitt

26 March 2011
15:00

| (BP) London Scottish | 60 - 10 | Macclesfield |
| | Report |

Richmond Athletic Ground
Attendance: 648

26 March 2011
15:00

| Redruth | 19 - 12 | Cinderford |
| | Report |

The Recreation Ground
Attendance: 1,000
Referee: Michael Tutty

26 March 2011
15:00

| (BP) Rosslyn Park | 28 - 51 | Cambridge (BP) |
| | Report |

The Rock
Attendance: 530
Referee: Nick Cockburn

26 March 2011
15:00

| Tynedale | 23 - 14 | Stourbridge |
| | Report |

Tynedale Park
Attendance: 415

26 March 2011
15:00

| Wharfedale | 14 - 34 | Barking (BP) |
| | Report |

The Avenue
Attendance: 432

=== Round 26 ===
2 April 2011
15:00

| (BP) Cinderford | 39 - 19 | Otley |
| | Report |

Dockham Road
Attendance: 310
Referee: Ian Tempest

2 April 2011
14:30

| (BP) Sedgley Park | 30 - 65 | Tynedale (BP) |
| | Report |

Park Lane
Attendance: 197
Referee: Andrew Vertigan

2 April 2011
15:00

| (BP) Barking | 31 - 16 | Stourbridge |
| | Report |

Goresbrook
Attendance: 260
Referee: Rowan Kitt

2 April 2011
15:00

| (BP) Blaydon | 34 - 24 | Blackheath |
| | Report |

Crow Trees
Attendance: 236
Referee: Ross Campbell

2 April 2011
15:00

| (BP) Cambridge | 52 - 5 | Redruth |
| | Report |

Grantchester Road
Attendance: 480
Referee: Nick Cockburn

2 April 2011
15:00

| (BP) Coventry | 27 - 39 | London Scottish (BP) |
| | Report |

Butts Park Arena
Attendance: 1,012
Referee: Andrew Jackson

2 April 2011
15:00

| (BP) Macclesfield | 39 - 31 | Rosslyn Park |
| | Report |

Priory Park
Attendance: 329
Referee: Tom Davis

2 April 2011
15:00

| (BP) Wharfedale | 10 - 12 | Launceston |
| | Report |

The Avenue
Attendance: 423
Referee: Simon Harding

=== Round 27 ===
9 April 2011
14:30

| (BP) Rosslyn Park | 43 - 26 | Coventry (BP) |
| | Report |

The Rock
Attendance: 390
Referee: Simon Harding

9 April 2011
15:00

| Blackheath | 23 - 22 | Wharfedale (2BP) |
| | Report |

Rectory Field
Attendance: 541
Referee: Matt Carley

9 April 2011
15:00

| (BP) Launceston | 25 - 29 | Barking (BP) |
| | Report |

Polson Bridge
Attendance: 735
Referee: Keith Lewis

9 April 2011
15:00

| (BP) London Scottish | 38 - 7 | Blaydon |
| | Report |

Richmond Athletic Ground
Attendance: 670
Referee: Tom Davis

9 April 2011
15:00

| (2BP) Otley | 29 - 31 | Cambridge (BP) |
| | Report |

Cross Green
Attendance: 473
Referee: Marcus Caton

9 April 2011
15:00

| Redruth | 17 - 17 | Macclesfield |
| | Report |

The Recreation Ground
Attendance: 950
Referee: Philip Davis

9 April 2011
15:00

| (BP) Stourbridge | 33 - 8 | Sedgley Park |
| | Report |

Stourton Park
Attendance: 450
Referee: Ian Tempest

9 April 2011
15:00

| Tynedale | 20 - 33 | Cinderford (BP) |
| | Report |

Tynedale Park
Attendance: 370
Referee: Andrew Jackson

=== Round 19 (Rescheduled game) ===
12 April 2011
19:30

| Wharfedale | 22 - 22 | Sedgley Park |
| | Report |

The Avenue
Attendance: 444
Referee: Andrew Taylorson

- Game rescheduled from 22 January 2011.

=== Round 28 ===
16 April 2011
14:00

| (2BP) Cambridge | 32 - 37 | Tynedale (BP) |
| | Report |

Grantchester Road
Attendance: 420
Referee: Wayne Falla

16 April 2011
15:00

| (BP) Barking | 75 - 7 | Sedgley Park |
| | Report |

Goresbrook
Attendance: 200
Referee: Richard Kelly

16 April 2011
15:00

| (BP) Blaydon | 60 - 20 | Rosslyn Park |
| | Report |

Crow Trees
Attendance: 283
Referee: Andrew Taylorson

16 April 2011
15:00

| (2BP) Cinderford | 38 - 41 | Stourbridge (BP) |
| | Report |

Dockham Road
Attendance: 320
Referee: Greg MacDonald

16 April 2011
15:00

| (2BP) Coventry | 26 - 27 | Redruth (BP) |
| | Report |

Butts Park Arena
Attendance: 769
Referee: Keith Lewis

16 April 2011
15:00

| (BP) Launceston | 31 - 40 | Blackheath (BP) |
| | Report |

Polson Bridge
Attendance: 915
Referee: Paul Knowles

16 April 2011
15:00

| Macclesfield | 28 - 25 | Otley (BP) |
| | Report |

Priory Park
Attendance: 327
Referee: Andrew Vertigan

16 April 2011
15:00

| (BP) Wharfedale | 24 - 31 | London Scottish (BP) |
| | Report |

The Avenue
Attendance: 411
Referee: John Meredith

=== Round 29 ===
23 April 2011
14:00

| (BP) Sedgley Park | 54 - 22 | Cinderford |
| | Report |

Park Lane
Attendance: 194
Referee: Darren Gamage

23 April 2011
14:30

| (BP) Rosslyn Park | 27 - 32 | Wharfedale (BP) |
| | Report |

The Rock
Attendance: 307
Referee: Nick Cockburn

23 April 2011
15:00

| (BP) Blackheath | 17 - 23 | Barking |
| | Report |

Rectory Field
Attendance: 1,127
Referee: Matt Carley

23 April 2011
15:00

| (BP) London Scottish | 47 - 29 | Launceston (BP) |
| | Report |

Richmond Athletic Ground
Attendance: 1,123
Referee: Simon Harding

23 April 2011
15:00

| (BP) Otley | 12 - 17 | Coventry |
| | Report |

Cross Green
Attendance: 516
Referee: Paul Knowles

23 April 2011
15:00

| Redruth | 26 - 25 | Blaydon (BP) |
| | Report |

The Recreation Ground
Attendance: 1,157
Referee: Terry Hall

23 April 2011
15:00

| Stourbridge | 22 - 35 | Cambridge (BP) |
| | Report |

Stourton Park
Attendance: 470
Referee: Andrew Taylorson

23 April 2011
15:00

| (BP) Tynedale | 34 - 20 | Macclesfield |
| | Report |

Tynedale Park
Attendance: 426
Referee: Chris Sharp

=== Round 30 ===
30 April 2011
14:00

| Blackheath | 17 - 29 | London Scottish (BP) |
| | Report |

Rectory Field
Attendance: 2,372
Referee: Darren Gamage

30 April 2011
14:00

| (BP) Blaydon | 50 - 19 | Otley |
| | Report |

Crow Trees
Attendance: 189

30 April 2011
14:00

| (BP) Cambridge | 78 - 23 | Sedgley Park (BP) |
| | Report |

Grantchester Road
Attendance: 410
Referee: Rowan Kitt

30 April 2011
14:00

| (BP) Coventry | 56 - 29 | Tynedale (BP) |
| | Report |

Butts Park Arena
Attendance: 840

30 April 2011
14:00

| (BP) Wharfedale | 22 - 33 | Redruth (BP) |
| | Report |

The Avenue
Attendance: 843

30 April 2011
15:00

| (BP) Cinderford | 10 - 14 | Barking |
| | Report |

Dockham Road
Attendance: 325

30 April 2011
15:00

| (BP) Launceston | 21 - 28 | Rosslyn Park |
| | Report |

Polson Bridge
Attendance: 639

30 April 2011
15:00

| (BP) Macclesfield | 48 - 24 | Stourbridge (BP) |
| | Report |

Priory Park
Attendance: 427

=== Round 16 (Rescheduled game) ===
2 May 2011
15:00

| (BP) Tynedale | 37 - 35 | Blaydon (2BP) |
| | Report |

Tynedale Park
Attendance: 796
Referee: Chris Sharp

- Rescheduled from 18 December 2010.

=== Rounds 16 & 19 (Rescheduled games) ===
7 May 2011
14:00

| (BP) Sedgley Park | 26 - 19 | Macclesfield (BP) |
| | Report |

Park Lane
Attendance: 947
Referee: Steve Lee

- Rescheduled from 18 December 2010.

7 May 2011
15:00

| (BP) Barking | 13 - 17 | London Scottish |
| | Report |

Goresbrook
Attendance: 287
Referee: Terry Hall

- Rescheduled from 18 December 2010.

7 May 2011
15:00

| (BP) Launceston | 50 - 17 | Stourbridge |
| | Report |

Polson Bridge
Attendance: 523
Referee: Mike Cooper

- Rescheduled from 22 January 2011.

7 May 2011

| Cinderford | C - C | Cambridge |

- Rescheduled from 18 December 2010. As game would not affect league outcome it was cancelled.

=== Round 19 (Rescheduled game) ===
14 May 2011
15:00

| (BP) Macclesfield | 49 - 12 | Barking |
| | Report |

Priory Park
Attendance: 575
Referee: Steve Lee

- Rescheduled from 22 January 2011.

=== Round 20 (Rescheduled game) ===
21 May 2011

| Cinderford | C - C | Wharfedale |

- Rescheduled from 29 January 2011. As game would not affect league outcome it was cancelled.

== Total Season Attendances ==
| Club | Home Games | Total | Average | Highest | Lowest | % Capacity |
|---|---|---|---|---|---|---|
| Barking | 15 | 3,171 | 211 | 360 | 142 | 21% |
| Blackheath | 15 | 12,984 | 866 | 2,372 | 457 | 25% |
| Blaydon | 15 | 4,313 | 288 | 1,324 | 147 | 14% |
| Cambridge | 15 | 7,197 | 480 | 750 | 300 | 22% |
| Cinderford | 13 (Note: Cinderford had two home games cancelled.) | 3,523 | 271 | 400 | 190 | 11% |
| Coventry | 15 | 12,552 | 837 | 1,541 | 432 | 21% |
| Launceston | 15 | 10,065 | 671 | 1,143 | 504 | 22% |
| London Scottish | 15 | 11,641 | 776 | 1,878 | 444 | 17% |
| Macclesfield | 15 | 5,597 | 373 | 575 | 279 | 30% |
| Otley | 15 | 6,680 | 445 | 893 | 317 | 6% |
| Redruth | 15 | 13,996 | 933 | 1,627 | 750 | 27% |
| Rosslyn Park | 15 | 7,568 | 505 | 840 | 237 | 25% |
| Sedgley Park | 15 | 6,215 | 414 | 1,022 | 176 | 14% |
| Stourbridge | 15 | 6,970 | 465 | 550 | 400 | 13% |
| Tynedale | 15 | 7,497 | 500 | 796 | 336 | 25% |
| Wharfedale | 15 | 7,640 | 509 | 843 | 407 | 25% |

== Individual statistics ==
- Note if players are tied on tries or points the player with the lowest number of appearances will come first. Also note that points scorers includes tries as well as conversions, penalties and drop goals.

=== Top points scorers ===
| Rank | Player | Team | Appearances | Points |
|---|---|---|---|---|
| 1 | (England) Stephen Nutt | Sedgley Park | 30 | 287 |
| 2 | (England) Adam Armstrong | Barking | 25 | 281 |
| 3 | (England) Sam Windsor | Blackheath | 30 | 260 |
| 4 | (Scotland) Ross Laidlaw | Rosslyn Park | 22 | 253 |
| 5 | (Cornwall) Aaron Penberthy | Redruth | 30 | 247 |
| 6 | (England) Thomas Davidson | Wharfedale | 27 | 218 |
| 7 | (England) Ross Winney | Macclesfield | 22 | 204 |
| 8 | (Cornwall) Ryan Westren | Launceston | 28 | 189 |
| 9 | (England) Gavin Beasley | Tynedale | 21 | 163 |
| 10 | (England) Danial Trigg | Cinderford | 26 | 151 |

=== Top try scorers ===
| Rank | Player | Team | Appearances | Tries |
|---|---|---|---|---|
| 1 | (England) David Howells | London Scottish | 26 | 24 |
| 1 | (Cornwall) Ryan Westren | Launceston | 28 | 24 |
| 2 | (Netherlands) Sepp Visser | Tynedale | 29 | 23 |
| 3 | (England) Robert 'Evan' Stewart | Macclesfield | 28 | 20 |
| 4 | (England) David Vincent | Barking | 27 | 19 |
| 4 | (New Zealand) Mark Bright | Redruth | 30 | 19 |
| 4 | (England) Thomas Harris | Coventry | 30 | 19 |
| 5 | (England) Billy Robinson | Cambridge | 29 | 18 |
| 6 | (England) David Allen | Blackheath | 25 | 17 |
| 7 | (England) Darren Fox | Cambridge | 25 | 16 |

== Season records ==
=== Team ===
Largest home win — 68 pts

75 - 7 Barking at home to Sedgley Park on 16 April 2011

Largest away win — 37 pts

40 - 3 London Scottish away to Blaydon on 5 February 2011

Most points scored — 78

78 - 23 Cambridge at home to Sedgley Park on 30 April 2011

Most tries in a match — 12

Cambridge at home to Sedgley Park on 30 April 2011

Most conversions in a match — 9

Cambridge at home to Sedgley Park on 30 April 2011

Most penalties in a match — 5

N/A - multiple teams

Most drop goals in a match — 2

London Scottish away to Tynedale on 29 January 2011

=== Player ===
Most points in a match — 28

(England) Henry Staff for Barking at home to Sedgley Park on 16 April 2011

Most tries in a match — 4 (x3)

(England) James Stephenson for Blackheath at home to Otley on 25 September 2010
(England) Scott Shaw for Barking at home to Sedgley Park on 16 April 2011
(England) Jeff Gregson for Coventry at home to Tynedale on 30 April 2011

Most conversions in a match — 9

(England) Ben Spencer for Cambridge at home to Sedgley Park on 30 April 2011

Most penalties in a match — 5

N/A - multiple players

Most drop goals in a match — 2

(England) James Brown for London Scottish away to Tynedale on 29 January 2011

=== Attendances ===
Highest — 2,372

Blackheath at home to London Scottish on 30 April 2011

Lowest — 142

Barking at home to Launceston on 5 February 2011

Highest Average Attendance — 933

Redruth

Lowest Average Attendance — 211

Barking

== See also ==
- English Rugby Union Leagues
- English rugby union system
- Rugby union in England
