= 2011–12 National League 2 South =

Rugby union competition in England

- Countries: England
- Champions: Old Albanian
- Runners-up: Richmond (also promoted)
- Relegated: Barnes, Hertford, Westcombe Park
- Attendance: 85,440 (average 367 per match) (Note: Note that 7 home attendances are missing (see below) - so the total attendance will not be 100% accurate. The average attendance has also been taken into account with the missing games not included.)
- Highest attendance: 1,640; Taunton Titans v Redruth; 10 March 2012
- Lowest attendance: 40; Barnes v Lydney; 27 August 2011
- Top point scorer: (Wales) Matthew McLean (Worthing Raiders); 341 points
- Top try scorer: (England) Ian Clark (Hartpury College); 27 tries

The 2011–12 National League 2 South was the third season (25th overall) of the fourth tier (south) of the English domestic rugby union competitions since the professionalised format of the second division was introduced. The league system was 4 points for a win, 2 points for a draw and additional bonus points being awarded for scoring 4 or more tries and/or losing within 7 points of the victorious team. In terms of promotion the league champions would go straight up into National League 1 while the runners up would have a one-game playoff against the runners up from National League 2 North (at the home ground of the club with the superior league record) for the final promotion place.

Old Albanian, as champions, were promoted to the third tier (2012–13 National League 1) for next season, along with Richmond who finished second, beating the 2011–12 National League 2 North runners up Caldy 20 - 13 after extra time at the Richmond Athletic Ground. Relegated teams included Barnes, Hertford (both having stayed in the division for just one season) as well as Westcombe Park, with all teams dropping into National League 3 London & SE due to being from the London area.

== Participating teams ==
Eleven of the teams listed below participated in the 2010–11 National League 2 South season; Launceston and Redruth were relegated from National League 1, Barnes (champions) and Hertford (playoffs) were promoted from National League 3 London & SE while Hartpury College were promoted from National League 3 South West.

Locations of the 2011–12 National League 2 South teams
Greater London National League 2 South clubs

Team	Stadium	Capacity	City/Area
Barnes	Barn Elms		Barnes, London
Clifton	Station Road	2,200 (200 seats)	Cribbs Causeway, Patchway, Bristol
Dings Crusaders	Landseer Avenue	1,500	Lockleaze, Bristol
Hartpury College	College Stadium	2,000	Hartpury, Gloucestershire
Henley Hawks	Dry Leas	4,000	Henley-on-Thames, Oxfordshire
Hertford	Highfields		Ware, Hertfordshire
Launceston	Polson Bridge	3,000	Launceston, Cornwall
Lydney	Regentsholme	3,000 (340 seats)	Lydney, Gloucestershire
Old Albanian	Woollam Playing Fields	1,000	St Albans, Hertfordshire
Redruth	Recreation Ground	3,500 (580 seats)	Redruth, Cornwall
Richmond	Athletic Ground	4,500 (1,000 seats)	Richmond, London
Shelford	The Davey Field	2,000 (150 seats)	Great Shelford, Cambridgeshire
Southend Saxons	Warners Park	1,500 (150 seats)	Southend, Essex
Taunton Titans	Hyde Park	2,000 (198 seats)	Taunton, Somerset
Westcombe Park	Goddington Dene	3,200	Orpington, London
Worthing Raiders	Roundstone Lane	1,500 (100 seats)	Angmering, West Sussex

== Final league table ==
2011-12 National Division Two South table
Pos	Team	Pld	W	D	L	PF	PA	PD	TB	LB	Pts	Qualification
1	Old Albanian (C)	30	25	0	5	1095	503	+592	20	3	123	Promoted
2	Richmond (P)	30	23	2	5	927	488	+439	19	3	118	Promotion play-off
3	Worthing Raiders	30	23	0	7	911	620	+291	20	2	114	
4	Hartpury College	30	21	1	8	983	579	+404	17	3	106	
5	Henley Hawks	30	20	2	8	855	507	+348	17	4	105	
6	Redruth	30	16	0	14	776	809	−33	13	4	81	
7	Launceston	30	16	0	14	714	590	+124	8	8	80	
8	Shelford	30	16	0	14	790	791	−1	10	4	78	
9	Clifton	30	12	0	18	685	841	−156	12	6	66	
10	South Saxons	30	12	0	18	694	868	−174	9	3	60	
11	Taunton Titans	30	10	0	20	682	1051	−369	13	5	58	
12	Dings Crusaders	30	11	0	19	552	741	−189	3	8	55	
13	Lydney	30	9	1	20	628	977	−349	8	4	50	
14	Westcombe Park	30	9	0	21	612	848	−236	7	8	46 (Note: 5 points deducted)	Relegated
15	Hertford	30	8	0	22	561	897	−336	9	2	43	Relegated
16	Barnes	30	6	0	24	595	950	−355	7	5	36	Relegated

Updated to match(es) played on 28-04-2012. Source: englandrugby.com
(C) Champion; (P) Promoted

== Results ==
=== Round 1 ===
27 August 2011
15:00

Barnes	15 – 32	Lydney (BP)
	Report

Barn Elms
Attendance: 40
Referee: Rob Warburton

27 August 2011
15:00

Clifton	8 – 28	Worthing Raiders (BP)
	Report

Station Road
Attendance: 90
Referee: Tom Davis

27 August 2011
15:00

(BP) Hertford	29 – 45	Henley Hawks (BP)
	Report

Highfields
Attendance: 374
Referee: Guy Steel Bodger

27 August 2011
15:00

(BP) Old Albanian	31 – 18	Launceston
	Report

Woollam Playing Fields
Attendance: 138
Referee: Simon McConnell

27 August 2011
15:00

(BP) Redruth	33 – 18	Shelford
	Report

The Recreation Ground
Attendance: 975
Referee: Shane Lewis

27 August 2011
15:00

(BP) Richmond	30 – 18	Hartpury College
	Report

Richmond Athletic Ground
Attendance: 407
Referee: Matt Carley

27 August 2011
15:00

(BP) Southend Saxons	32 – 17	Westcombe Park
	Report

Warners Bridge Park
Attendance: 130
Referee: Paul Kimber

27 August 2011
15:00

Taunton	19 – 12	Dings Crusaders (BP)
	Report

Hyde Park
Attendance: 470
Referee: Mike Cooper

=== Round 2 ===
3 September 2011
14:30

Hartpury College	22 – 10	Barnes
	Report

College Stadium
Referee: Simon Harding

3 September 2011
15:00

(BP) Dings Crusaders	21 – 24	Old Albanian
	Report

Landseer Avenue
Attendance: 105
Referee: David Procter

3 September 2011
15:00

(BP) Henley Hawks	39 – 7	Taunton
	Report

Dry Leas
Attendance: 310
Referee: Mike Cooper

3 September 2011
15:00

(BP) Launceston	22 – 26	Clifton
	Report

Polson Bridge
Attendance: 509
Referee: John Healy

3 September 2011
15:00

Lydney	8 – 5	Hertford (BP)
	Report

Regentsholme
Attendance: 506
Referee: Tom Foley

3 September 2011
15:00

(BP) Richmond	55 – 28	Southend Saxons
	Report

Richmond Athletic Ground
Attendance: 401
Referee: Tom Davis

3 September 2011
15:00

(BP) Shelford	36 – 24	Westcombe Park (BP)
	Report

The Davey Field
Attendance: 270
Referee: Will Halford

3 September 2011
15:00

Worthing Raiders	27 – 25	Redruth (BP)
	Report

Roundstone Lane
Attendance: 325
Referee: Richard Phillips

=== Round 3 ===
10 September 2011
15:00

Clifton	27 – 20	Dings Crusaders (BP)
	Report

Station Road
Attendance: 250
Referee: Richard Phillips

10 September 2011
15:00

Barnes	13 – 36	Richmond (BP)
	Report

Barn Elms
Attendance: 150
Referee: Charles Samson

10 September 2011
15:00

Hertford	25 – 64	Hartpury College (BP)
	Report

Highfields
Attendance: 325
Referee: Phil Watters

10 September 2011
15:00

(BP) Old Albanian	17 – 19	Henley Hawks
	Report

Woollam Playing Fields
Attendance: 198
Referee: Nick Williams

10 September 2011
15:00

Redruth	15 – 13	Launceston (BP)
	Report

The Recreation Ground
Attendance: 1,258
Referee: Marcus Caton

10 September 2011
15:00

(BP) Southend Saxons	26 – 27	Shelford (BP)
	Report

Warners Bridge Park
Attendance: 150
Referee: Graham Dickens

10 September 2011
15:00

(BP) Taunton	35 – 45	Lydney (BP)
	Report

Hyde Park
Attendance: 371
Referee: Jason Bessant

10 September 2011
15:00

(BP) Westcombe Park	29 – 38	Worthing Raiders (BP)
	Report

Goddington Dene
Attendance: 311
Referee: Simon Walker

=== Round 4 ===
17 September 2011
14:30

(BP) Hartpury College	34 – 14	Taunton
	Report

College Stadium
Attendance: 265
Referee: David Procter

17 September 2011
14:30

Dings Crusaders	13 – 35	Redruth (BP)
	Report

Landseer Avenue
Attendance: 150
Referee: Nick Cockburn

17 September 2011
15:00

Barnes	12 – 22	Southend Saxons
	Report

Barn Elms
Attendance: 50
Referee: Tom Foley

17 September 2011
15:00

(BP) Henley Hawks	52 – 3	Clifton
	Report

Dry Leas
Attendance: 225
Referee: Fergus Kirby

17 September 2011
15:00

(BP) Launceston	48 – 7	Westcombe Park
	Report

Polson Bridge
Attendance: 443
Referee: Steve Leyshon

17 September 2011
15:00

Lydney	23 – 41	Old Albanian (BP)
	Report

Regentsholme
Attendance: 482
Referee: John Healy

17 September 2011
15:00

(BP) Worthing Raiders	31 – 13	Shelford
	Report

Roundstone Lane
Attendance: 340
Referee: Keith Lewis

17 September 2011
19:00

(BP) Richmond	25 – 9	Hertford
	Report

Richmond Athletic Ground
Attendance: 433
Referee: Simon McConnell

=== Round 5 ===
24 September 2011
14:30

(BP) Clifton	13 – 19	Lydney
	Report

Station Road
Attendance: 213
Referee: Lloyd Linton

24 September 2011
15:00

Hertford	27 – 23	Barnes (BP)
	Report

Highfields
Attendance: 235
Referee: Fergus Kirby

24 September 2011
15:00

(BP) Old Albanian	22 – 23	Hartpury College
	Report

Woollam Playing Fields
Attendance: 136
Referee: Richard Phillips

24 September 2011
15:00

(BP) Redruth	13 – 14	Henley Hawks
	Report

The Recreation Ground
Attendance: 696
Referee: Paul Kimber

24 September 2011
15:00

Shelford	33 – 30	Launceston (2BP)
	Report

The Davey Field
Attendance: 265
Referee: David Procter

24 September 2011
15:00

Southend Saxons	19 – 38	Worthing Raiders (BP)
	Report

Warners Bridge Park
Attendance: 150
Referee: Simon McConnell

24 September 2011
15:00

Taunton	22 – 52	Richmond (BP)
	Report

Hyde Park
Referee: Tom Foley

24 September 2011
15:00

(BP) Westcombe Park	31 – 20	Dings Crusaders
	Report

Goddington Dene
Attendance: 213
Referee: Ed Turnhill

=== Round 6 ===
1 October 2011
14:30

(BP) Dings Crusaders	26 – 30	Shelford (BP)
	Report

Landseer Avenue
Attendance: 110
Referee: Mike Cooper

1 October 2011
14:30

(BP) Hartpury College	36 – 23	Clifton
	Report

College Stadium
Attendance: 200
Referee: Andrew Vertigan

1 October 2011
15:00

(BP) Barnes	59 – 33	Taunton (BP)
	Report

Barn Elms
Referee: Simon McConnell

1 October 2011
15:00

(BP) Henley Hawks	50 – 20	Westcombe Park
	Report

Dry Leas
Attendance: 405
Referee: Nick Cockburn

1 October 2011
15:00

(BP) Hertford	39 – 11	Southend Saxons
	Report

Highfields
Attendance: 273
Referee: John Healy

1 October 2011
15:00

(BP) Launceston	24 – 25	Worthing Raiders (BP)
	Report

Polson Bridge
Attendance: 426
Referee: Nick Williams

1 October 2011
15:00

(BP) Lydney	21 – 27	Redruth (BP)
	Report

Regentsholme
Attendance: 423
Referee: David Procter

1 October 2011
15:00

(BP) Richmond	42 – 20	Old Albanian
	Report

Richmond Athletic Ground
Attendance: 319
Referee: Richard Kelly

=== Round 7 ===
8 October 2011
14:30

Clifton	3 – 27	Richmond (BP)
	Report

Station Road
Attendance: 160
Referee: Paul Kimber

8 October 2011
15:00

(BP) Old Albanian	56 – 12	Barnes
	Report

Woollam Playing Fields
Attendance: 190
Referee: Charles Samson

8 October 2011
15:00

Redruth	20 – 17	Hartpury College (BP)
	Report

The Recreation Ground
Attendance: 706
Referee: Tom Davis

8 October 2011
15:00

(BP) Shelford	10 – 12	Henley Hawks
	Report

The Davey Field
Attendance: 272
Referee: Phil Watters

8 October 2011
15:00

Southend Saxons	29 – 20	Launceston
	Report

Warners Bridge Park
Attendance: 150
Referee: Graham Dickens

8 October 2011
15:00

(BP) Taunton	35 – 24	Hertford
	Report

Hyde Park
Referee: Richard Phillips

8 October 2011
15:00

(2BP) Westcombe Park	26 – 29	Lydney (BP)
	Report

Goddington Dene
Attendance: 191
Referee: Simon McConnell

8 October 2011
15:00

(BP) Worthing Raiders	36 - 13	Dings Crusaders
	Report

Roundstone Lane
Attendance: 315
Referee: Keith Lewis

=== Round 8 ===
15 October 2011
14:00

Dings Crusaders	28 – 27	Launceston (2BP)
	Report

Landseer Avenue
Attendance: 125
Referee: Philip Davis

15 October 2011
14:00

(BP) Hartpury College	50 – 10	Westcombe Park
	Report

College Stadium
Attendance: 205
Referee: Clare Daniels

15 October 2011
15:00

(BP) Barnes	33 – 26	Clifton (2BP)
	Report

Barn Elms
Attendance: 52
Referee: Graham Dickens

15 October 2011
15:00

(BP) Henley Hawks	9 – 10	Worthing Raiders
	Report

Dry Leas
Attendance: 525
Referee: Richard Kelly

15 October 2011
15:00

Hertford	6 – 23	Old Albanian
	Report

Highfields
Attendance: 355
Referee: Rob Warburton

15 October 2011
15:00

(BP) Lydney	17 – 23	Shelford
	Report

Regentsholme
Attendance: 358
Referee: Alex Manley

15 October 2011
15:00

(BP) Richmond	66 – 7	Redruth
	Report

Richmond Athletic Ground
Attendance: 321
Referee: Simon Harding

15 October 2011
15:00

(BP) Taunton	27 – 49	Southend Saxons (BP)
	Report

Hyde Park
Attendance: 560
Referee: Simone Colantonio

=== Round 9 ===
22 October 2011
15:00

(BP) Clifton	56 – 12	Hertford
	Report

Station Road
Attendance: 245
Referee: John Healy

22 October 2011
15:00

(BP) Launceston	28 – 12	Henley Hawks
	Report

Polson Bridge
Attendance: 755
Referee: Shane Lewis

22 October 2011
15:00

(BP) Old Albanian	62 – 7	Taunton
	Report

Woollam Playing Fields
Attendance: 169
Referee: Tom Foley

22 October 2011
15:00

(BP) Redruth	56 – 22	Barnes
	Report

The Recreation Ground
Attendance: 680
Referee: Rob Warburton

22 October 2011
15:00

(BP) Southend Saxons	17 – 24	Dings Crusaders
	Report

Warners Bridge Park
Attendance: 200
Referee: John Lacey

22 October 2011
15:00

Shelford	21 – 58	Hartpury College (BP)
	Report

The Davey Field
Attendance: 291
Referee: Mike Cooper

22 October 2011
15:00

(BP) Westcombe Park	25 – 31	Richmond (BP)
	Report

Goddington Dene
Attendance: 250
Referee: David Procter

22 October 2011
15:00

(BP) Worthing Raiders	80 – 31	Lydney (BP)
	Report

Roundstone Lane
Attendance: 307
Referee: Nick Williams

=== Round 10 ===
29 October 2011
14:30

(2BP) Barnes	20 – 24	Westcombe Park
	Report

Barn Elms
Attendance: 60
Referee: Fergus Kirby

29 October 2011
14:30

(BP) Hartpury College	49 – 14	Worthing Raiders
	Report

College Stadium
Attendance: 240
Referee: Richard Phillips

29 October 2011
15:00

(BP) Henley Hawks	35 – 8	Dings Crusaders
	Report

Dry Leas
Attendance: 450
Referee: Nick Williams

29 October 2011
15:00

(BP) Hertford	34 – 22	Redruth
	Report

Highfields
Attendance: 375
Referee: Mike Cooper

29 October 2011
15:00

(BP) Lydney	20 – 22	Launceston
	Report

Regentsholme
Attendance: 325
Referee: Andy Rawson

29 October 2011
15:00

Old Albanian	22 – 33	Southend Saxons (BP)
	Report

Woollam Playing Fields
Attendance: 172
Referee: Luke Haskins

29 October 2011
15:00

(BP) Richmond	41 – 14	Shelford
	Report

Richmond Athletic Ground
Attendance: 637
Referee: Tom Foley

29 October 2011
15:00

(BP) Taunton	37 – 25	Clifton
	Report

Hyde Park
Attendance: 501
Referee: David Procter

=== Round 11 ===
5 November 2011
14:00

Westcombe Park	40 – 17	Hertford
	Report

Goddington Dene
Attendance: 264
Referee: Mark Liddell

5 November 2011
14:00

Worthing Raiders	21 – 17	Richmond (BP)
	Report

Roundstone Lane
Attendance: 617
Referee: Nick Cockburn

5 November 2011
14:30

Clifton	18 – 30	Old Albanian
	Report

Station Road
Attendance: 97
Referee: Richard Phillips

5 November 2011
14:30

(BP) Dings Crusaders	27 – 34	Lydney (BP)
	Report

Landseer Avenue
Attendance: 150
Referee: Keith Lewis

5 November 2011
14:30

Launceston	19 – 34	Hartpury College (BP)
	Report

Polson Bridge
Attendance: 542
Referee: John Healy

5 November 2011
14:30

(BP) Redruth	35 – 34	Taunton (2BP)
	Report

The Recreation Ground
Attendance: 825
Referee: Paul Kimber

5 November 2011
14:30

Shelford	29 – 24	Barnes (2BP)
	Report

The Davey Field
Attendance: 241
Referee: Nick Williams

5 November 2011
14:30

(BP) Southend Saxons	21 – 15	Henley Hawks
	Report

Warners Bridge Park
Attendance: 110
Referee: Simon McConnell

=== Round 12 ===
12 November 2011
14:30

Barnes	12 – 30	Worthing Raiders (BP)
	Report

Barn Elms
Attendance: 110
Referee: Mark Liddell

12 November 2011
14:30

(BP) Clifton	30 – 11	Southend Saxons
	Report

Station Road
Attendance: 60
Referee: Daniel Jones

12 November 2011
14:30

Hartpury College	14 – 11	Dings Crusaders (BP)
	Report

College Stadium
Attendance: 265
Referee: Rob Warburton

12 November 2011
14:30

(BP) Richmond	38 – 15	Launceston
	Report

Richmond Athletic Ground
Attendance: 402
Referee: Paul Knowles

12 November 2011
15:00

(BP) Hertford	29 – 21	Shelford
	Report

Highfields
Attendance: 456
Referee: Mark Phillips

12 November 2011
15:00

Lydney	12 – 33	Henley Hawks (BP)
	Report

Regentsholme
Attendance: 385
Referee: Shane Lewis

12 November 2011
15:00

(BP) Old Albanian	50 – 7	Redruth
	Report

Woollam Playing Fields
Attendance: 201
Referee: Simon McConnell

12 November 2011
15:00

(BP) Taunton	46 – 23	Westcombe Park
	Report

Hyde Park
Attendance: 487
Referee: Keith Lewis

=== Round 13 ===
19 November 2011
14:00

Westcombe Park	12 – 31	Old Albanian (BP)
	Report

Goddington Dene
Attendance: 180
Referee: Paul Kimber

19 November 2011
14:00

(BP) Worthing Raiders	31 – 14	Hertford
	Report

Roundstone Lane
Attendance: 302
Referee: Keith Lewis

19 November 2011
14:30

(BP) Dings Crusaders	13 – 18	Richmond
	Report

Landseer Avenue
Attendance: 293
Referee: Simon McConnell

19 November 2011
14:30

(BP) Launceston	39 – 17	Barnes
	Report

Polson Bridge
Attendance: 526
Referee: Luke Haskins

19 November 2011
14:30

(BP) Redruth	42 – 35	Clifton (BP)
	Report

The Recreation Ground
Attendance: 782
Referee: Nick Williams

19 November 2011
14:30

Shelford	17 – 36	Taunton (BP)
	Report

The Davey Field
Attendance: 269
Referee: Tom Foley

19 November 2011
15:00

(BP) Henley Hawks	34 – 20	Hartpury College
	Report

Dry Leas
Attendance: 525
Referee: Richard Phillips

19 November 2011
15:00

(BP) Southend Saxons	62 – 29	Lydney (BP)
	Report

Warners Bridge Park
Attendance: 200
Referee: Mike Cooper

=== Round 14 ===
26 November 2011
14:30

Barnes	28 – 19	Dings Crusaders
	Report

Barn Elms
Attendance: 70
Referee: Richard Kelly

26 November 2011
14:30

(BP) Clifton	24 – 8	Westcombe Park
	Report

Station Road
Attendance: 160
Referee: Simon McConnell

26 November 2011
14:30

(BP) Hartpury College	62 – 10	Lydney
	Report

College Stadium
Attendance: 365

26 November 2011
14:30

(BP) Redruth	49 – 6	Southend Saxons
	Report

The Recreation Ground
Attendance: 715
Referee: Fergus Kirby

26 November 2011
15:00

Hertford	7 – 37	Launceston (BP)
	Report

Highfields
Attendance: 337

26 November 2011
15:00

(BP) Old Albanian	47 – 14	Shelford
	Report

Woollam Playing Fields
Attendance: 214
Referee: Richard Harding

26 November 2011
15:00

Richmond	24 – 37	Henley Hawks (BP)
	Report

Richmond Athletic Ground
Attendance: 723
Referee: Matt Carley

26 November 2011
15:00

(BP) Taunton	18 – 22	Worthing Raiders
	Report

Hyde Park
Attendance: 850
Referee: Philip Davis

=== Round 15 ===
3 December 2011
14:00

(BP) Henley Hawks	44 – 21	Barnes
	Report

Dry Leas
Attendance: 310

3 December 2011
14:00

Westcombe Park	10 – 33	Redruth (BP)
	Report

Goddington Dene
Attendance: 230
Referee: Richard Phillips

3 December 2011
14:00

Worthing Raiders	13 – 41	Old Albanian (BP)
	Report

Roundstone Lane
Attendance: 412
Referee: Tom Davis

3 December 2011
14:15

Shelford	22 – 33	Clifton (BP)
	Report

The Davey Field
Attendance: 195
Referee: Mike Cooper

3 December 2011
14:30

Dings Crusaders	19 – 12	Hertford (BP)
	Report

Landseer Avenue
Attendance: 250

3 December 2011
14:30

(BP) Launceston	42 – 15	Taunton
	Report

Polson Bridge
Attendance: 716
Referee: Simon McConnell

3 December 2011
15:00

(BP) Lydney	35 – 35	Richmond (BP)
	Report

Regentsholme
Attendance: 457
Referee: K White

3 December 2011
15:00

Southend Saxons	14 – 66	Hartpury College (BP)
	Report

Warners Bridge Park
Attendance: 220
Referee: Max Marsden

=== Round 16 ===
10 December 2011
14:00

Barnes	26 – 46	Hartpury College (BP)
	Report

Barn Elms
Attendance: 50
Referee: Simone Colantonio

10 December 2011
14:00

(BP) Redruth	37 – 22	Worthing Raiders
	Report

The Recreation Ground
Attendance: 770
Referee: Nick Williams

10 December 2011
14:00

Westcombe Park	21 – 16	Shelford (BP)
	Report

Goddington Dene
Attendance: 208
Referee: Ed Turnhill

10 December 2011
14:30

Clifton	24 – 21	Launceston (BP)
	Report

Station Road
Attendance: 260
Referee: Guy Steel Bodger

10 December 2011
15:00

(BP) Hertford	46 – 23	Lydney
	Report

Highfields
Attendance: 310
Referee: David Procter

10 December 2011
15:00

(BP) Old Albanian	62 – 3	Dings Crusaders
	Report

Woollam Playing Fields
Attendance: 235
Referee: Simon McConnell

10 December 2011
15:00

Southend Saxons	16 – 27	Richmond (BP)
	Report

Warners Bridge Park
Attendance: 200
Referee: Richard Phillips

10 December 2011
15:00

Taunton	20 – 16	Henley Hawks (BP)
	Report

Hyde Park
Attendance: 643
Referee: Mark Liddell

=== Round 17 ===
16 December 2011
20:00

Richmond	20 – 8	Barnes
	Report

Richmond Athletic Ground
Attendance: 738

17 December 2011
14:00

Worthing Raiders	39 – 20	Westcombe Park
	Report

Roundstone Lane
Attendance: 423
Referee: Fergus Kirby

17 December 2011
15:00

(BP) Lydney	12 – 13	Taunton
	Report

Regentsholme
Attendance: 532
Referee: Marcus Caton

17 December 2011
14:15

(BP) Shelford	21 – 24	Southend Saxons
	Report

The Davey Field
Attendance: 188
Referee: Will Halford

17 December 2011
14:30

Dings Crusaders	20 – 15	Clifton (BP)
	Report

Landseer Avenue
Attendance: 250
Referee: Terry Hall

17 December 2011
14:30

(2BP) Hartpury College	22 – 24	Hertford (BP)
	Report

College Stadium
Attendance: 140
Referee: Mark Williams

17 December 2011
15:00

Launceston	20 – 10	Redruth
	Report

Polson Bridge
Attendance: 1,064
Referee: Richard Kelly

17 December 2011
15:00

Henley Hawks	7 – 17	Old Albanian
	Report

Dry Leas
Attendance: 325
Referee: John Healy

=== Round 18 ===
7 January 2012
14:00

Redruth	24 – 23	Dings Crusaders (BP)
	Report

The Recreation Ground
Attendance: 690
Referee: John Healy

7 January 2012
14:00

Shelford	19 – 15	Worthing Raiders (BP)
	Report

The Davey Field
Attendance: 238
Referee: Fergus Kirby

7 January 2012
14:00

(BP) Westcombe Park	12 – 18	Launceston
	Report

Goddington Dene
Attendance: 163
Referee: Matt Carley

7 January 2012
14:30

Clifton	20 – 29	Henley Hawks (BP)
	Report

Station Road
Attendance: 220
Referee: Tom Foley

7 January 2012
15:00

Hertford	3 – 28	Richmond (BP)
	Report

Highfields
Attendance: 433
Referee: Simon McConnell

7 January 2012
15:00

(BP) Old Albanian	57 – 8	Lydney
	Report

Woollam Playing Fields
Attendance: 210
Referee: Richard Phillips

7 January 2012
15:00

(BP) Southend Saxons	30 – 35	Barnes (BP)
	Report

Warners Bridge Park
Attendance: 150
Referee: Rowan Kitt

7 January 2012
15:00

Taunton	19 – 53	Hartpury College (BP)
	Report

Hyde Park
Attendance: 753
Referee: Graham Dickens

=== Round 19 ===
14 January 2012
14:00

(BP) Barnes	37 – 21	Hertford
	Report

Barn Elms
Attendance: 265
Referee: Nick Williams

14 January 2012
14:00

(BP) Worthing Raiders	29 – 5	Southend Saxons
	Report

Roundstone Lane
Attendance: 327
Referee: Ed Turnhill

14 January 2012
14:30

(BP) Dings Crusaders	32 – 18	Westcombe Park
	Report

Landseer Avenue
Attendance: 115
Referee: Rowan Kitt

14 January 2012
14:30

Hartpury College	18 – 32	Old Albanian (BP)
	Report

College Stadium
Attendance: 326
Referee: Richard Kelly

14 January 2012
14:30

(BP) Launceston	23 – 24	Shelford
	Report

Polson Bridge
Attendance: 685
Referee: John Healy

14 January 2012
15:00

(BP) Henley Hawks	32 – 22	Redruth
	Report

Dry Leas
Attendance: 445
Referee: Paul Kimber

14 January 2012
15:00

Lydney	20 – 31	Clifton (BP)
	Report

Regentsholme
Attendance: 487
Referee: Max Marsden

14 January 2012
15:00

(BP) Richmond	53 – 14	Taunton
	Report

Richmond Athletic Ground
Attendance: 605
Referee: David Procter

=== Round 20 ===
21 January 2012
14:00

Clifton	24 – 20	Hartpury College (BP)
	Report

Station Road
Attendance: 278
Referee: Ben Whitehouse

21 January 2012
14:00

Westcombe Park	24 – 41	Henley Hawks (BP)
	Report

Goddington Dene
Attendance: 203
Referee: Richard Phillips

21 January 2012
14:00

(BP) Worthing Raiders	24 – 16	Launceston
	Report

Roundstone Lane
Attendance: 436
Referee: Rob Warburton

21 January 2012
14:15

(BP) Shelford	34 – 9	Dings Crusaders
	Report

The Davey Field
Attendance: 208
Referee: Simon Harding

21 January 2012
14:30

(BP) Redruth	36 – 15	Lydney
	Report

The Recreation Ground
Attendance: 810
Referee: Mike Cooper

21 January 2012
15:00

Old Albanian	20 – 17	Richmond (BP)
	Report

Woollam Playing Fields
Attendance: 300
Referee: Ross Campbell

21 January 2012
15:00

(BP) Southend Saxons	29 – 12	Hertford
	Report

Warners Bridge Park
Attendance: 220
Referee: Simon Walker

21 January 2012
15:00

(BP) Taunton	37 – 12	Barnes
	Report

Hyde Park
Attendance: 401
Referee: Simon McConnell

=== Round 21 ===
28 January 2012
14:00

Barnes	7 – 45	Old Albanian (BP)
	Report

Barn Elms
Attendance: 100
Referee: Mike Cooper

28 January 2012
14:30

Dings Crusaders	26 – 22	Worthing Raiders (BP)
	Report

Landseer Avenue
Attendance: 250
Referee: David Procter

28 January 2012
14:30

(BP) Hartpury College	40 – 10	Redruth
	Report

College Stadium
Attendance: 210
Referee: Paul Knowles

28 January 2012
14:30

Launceston	30 – 10	Southend Saxons
	Report

Polson Bridge
Attendance: 530
Referee: Paul Kimber

28 January 2012
15:00

(BP) Henley Hawks	17 – 21	Shelford
	Report

Dry Leas
Attendance: 340
Referee: Nick Williams

28 January 2012
15:00

(BP) Hertford	30 – 28	Taunton (2BP)
	Report

Highfields
Attendance: 317
Referee: Keith Lewis

28 January 2012
15:00

Lydney	5 – 17	Westcombe Park
	Report

Regentsholme
Attendance: 487
Referee: James Sullivan

28 January 2012
15:00

(BP) Richmond	26 – 10	Clifton
	Report

Richmond Athletic Ground
Attendance: 479
Referee: John Healy

=== Round 22 ===
11 February 2012
14:30

(BP) Clifton	37 - 12	Barnes
	Report

Station Road
Attendance: 412
Referee: Ed Turnill

11 February 2012
14:30

Redruth	10 – 36	Richmond (BP)
	Report

The Recreation Ground
Attendance: 765
Referee: Nick Williams

11 February 2012
14:30

Launceston	18 – 0	Dings Crusaders
	Report

Polson Bridge
Attendance: 785
Referee: Keith Lewis

11 February 2012

Old Albanians	P – P	Hertford

- Postponed. Game rescheduled to 25 February 2012.

11 February 2012

Shelford	P – P	Lydney

- Postponed. Game rescheduled to 25 February 2012.

11 February 2012

Southend Saxons	P – P	Taunton

- Postponed. Game rescheduled to 25 February 2012.

11 February 2012

Westcombe Park	P – P	Hartpury College

- Postponed. Game rescheduled to 25 February 2012.

11 February 2012

Worthing Raiders	P – P	Henley Hawks

- Postponed. Game rescheduled to 25 February 2012.

=== Round 23 ===
18 February 2012
15:00

(BP) Barnes	9 – 15	Redruth
	Report

Barn Elms
Attendance: 100
Referee: David Procter

18 February 2012
14:30

Dings Crusaders	18 – 8	Southend Saxons
	Report

Landseer Avenue
Attendance: 120
Referee: John Healy

18 February 2012
14:30

Hartpury College	12 – 26	Shelford (BP)
	Report

College Stadium
Attendance: 250
Referee: Elia Rizzo

18 February 2012
15:00

(BP) Henley Hawks	28 – 5	Launceston
	Report

Dry Leas
Referee: Nick Cockburn

18 February 2012
15:00

Hertford	9 – 5	Clifton (BP)
	Report

Highfields
Attendance: 287
Referee: Terry Hall

18 February 2012
15:00

Lydney	13 – 32	Worthing Raiders (BP)
	Report

Regentsholme
Attendance: 321
Referee: Richard Phillips

18 February 2012
15:00

Richmond	13 – 6	Westcombe Park (BP)
	Report

Richmond Athletic Ground
Attendance: 642
Referee: Keith Lewis

18 February 2012
15:00

Taunton	6 – 37	Old Albanian (BP)
	Report

Hyde Park
Attendance: 651
Referee: Shane Lewis

=== Round 22 (Rescheduled Games) ===
25 February 2012
14:00

(BP) Westcombe Park	13 – 15	Hartpury College
	Report

Goddington Dene
Attendance: 132
Referee: Paul Kimber

- Rescheduled from 22 February 2012.

25 February 2012
14:00

(BP) Worthing Raiders	35 – 21	Henley Hawks
	Report

Roundstone Lane
Attendance: 389
Referee: Simon McConnell

- Rescheduled from 22 February 2012.

25 February 2012
14:30

(BP) Shelford	66 – 18	Lydney
	Report

The Davey Field
Attendance: 216
Referee: Rowan Kitt

- Rescheduled from 22 February 2012.

25 February 2012
15:00

(BP) Old Albanian	33 – 21	Hertford
	Report

Woollam Playing Fields
Attendance: 207
Referee: Richard Phillips

- Rescheduled from 22 February 2012.

25 February 2012
15:00

(BP) Southend Saxons	33 – 29	Taunton (2BP)
	Report

Warners Bridge Park
Attendance: 110
Referee: Mike Cooper

- Rescheduled from 22 February 2012.

=== Round 24 ===
2 March 2012
19:45

(BP) Clifton	34 – 11	Taunton
	Report

Station Road
Attendance: 457
Referee: Paul Knowles

3 March 2012
14:00

Westcombe Park	23 – 34	Barnes (BP)
	Report

Goddington Dene
Attendance: 203
Referee: Terry Hall

3 March 2012
14:30

Launceston	27 – 26	Lydney (BP)
	Report

Polson Bridge
Attendance: 545
Referee: David Procter

3 March 2012
15:00

Dings Crusaders	12 – 3	Henley Hawks
	Report

Landseer Avenue
Attendance: 150
Referee: Ross Campbell

3 March 2012
15:00

(BP) Redruth	38 – 24	Hertford
	Report

The Recreation Ground
Attendance: 1,023
Referee: Fergus Kirby

3 March 2012
15:00

Shelford	9 – 23	Richmond
	Report

The Davey Field
Attendance: 499
Referee: Rob Warburton

3 March 2012
15:00

Southend Saxons	22 – 42	Old Albanian (BP)
	Report

Warners Bridge Park
Attendance: 160
Referee: Mark Liddell

3 March 2012
15:00

(BP) Worthing Raiders	29 – 14	Hartpury College
	Report

Roundstone Lane
Attendance: 428
Referee: Ed Turnhill

=== Round 25 ===
10 March 2012
15:00

Barnes	15 – 33	Shelford (BP)
	Report

Barn Elms
Attendance: 50
Referee: Paul Kimber

10 March 2012
15:00

(BP) Hartpury College	27 – 25	Launceston (BP)
	Report

College Stadium
Attendance: 210
Referee: Nick Williams

10 March 2012
15:00

(BP) Henley Hawks	32 – 7	Southend Saxons
	Report

Dry Leas
Attendance: 265
Referee: Rob Warburton

10 March 2012
15:00

Hertford	13 – 22	Westcombe Park
	Report

Highfields
Attendance: 285
Referee: Richard Kelly

10 March 2012
15:00

Lydney	29 – 10	Dings Crusaders
	Report

Regentsholme
Attendance: 215
Referee: Simon Harding

10 March 2012
15:00

(BP) Old Albanian	51 – 19	Clifton
	Report

Woollam Playing Fields
Attendance: 190
Referee: Rowan Kitt

10 March 2012
15:00

Richmond	18 – 5	Worthing Raiders
	Report

Richmond Athletic Ground
Attendance: 352
Referee: David Procter

10 March 2012
15:00

(BP) Taunton	35 – 34	Redruth (2BP)
	Report

Hyde Park
Attendance: 1,640
Referee: Ed Turnhill

=== Round 26 ===
24 March 2012
14:30

Dings Crusaders	16 – 24	Hartpury College (BP)
	Report

Landseer Avenue
Attendance: 135
Referee: Tom Davis

24 March 2012
14:30

Launceston	18 – 16	Richmond (BP)
	Report

Polson Bridge
Attendance: 726
Referee: Richard Phillips

24 March 2012
15:00

(BP) Henley Hawks	46 – 30	Lydney (BP)
	Report

Dry Leas
Attendance: 405

24 March 2012
15:00

(BP) Redruth	27 – 38	Old Albanian (BP)
	Report

The Recreation Ground
Attendance: 923
Referee: John Healy

24 March 2012
15:00

(BP) Shelford	37 – 27	Hertford (BP)
	Report

The Davey Field
Attendance: 436
Referee: Guy Steel Bodger

24 March 2012
15:00

(BP) Southend Saxons	51 – 32	Clifton (BP)
	Report

Warners Bridge Park
Attendance: 130

24 March 2012
15:00

(BP) Westcombe Park	39 – 20	Taunton
	Report

Goddington Dene
Attendance: 212
Referee: Mike Cooper

24 March 2012
15:00

(BP) Worthing Raiders	39 – 30	Barnes
	Report

Roundstone Lane
Attendance: 624
Referee: Keith Lewis

=== Round 27 ===
31 March 2012
14:30

(BP) Clifton	31 – 24	Redruth (BP)
	Report

Station Road
Attendance: 187
Referee: Mike Cooper

31 March 2012
14:30

Hartpury College	24 – 24	Henley Hawks
	Report

College Stadium
Attendance: 300
Referee: Karl Kirkpatrick

31 March 2012
15:00

Barnes	13 – 20	Launceston
	Report

Barn Elms
Attendance: 51
Referee: Guy Steel Bodger

31 March 2012
15:00

Hertford	14 – 25	Worthing Raiders (BP)
	Report

Highfields
Attendance: 345
Referee: Richard Phillips

31 March 2012
15:00

Lydney	21 – 10	Southend Saxons
	Report

Regentsholme
Attendance: 312
Referee: Nick Williams

31 March 2012
15:00

(BP) Old Albanian	24 – 18	Westcombe Park (BP)
	Report

Woollam Playing Fields
Attendance: 215
Referee: Simon McConnell

31 March 2012
15:00

(BP) Richmond	45 – 12	Dings Crusaders
	Report

Richmond Athletic Ground
Attendance: 617
Referee: Paul Kimber

31 March 2012
15:00

(BP) Taunton	32 – 29	Shelford (BP)
	Report

Hyde Park
Attendance: 517
Referee: Phil Watters

=== Round 28 ===
14 April 2012
14:30

(BP) Dings Crusaders	31 – 17	Barnes
	Report

Landseer Avenue
Referee: Nick Cockburn

14 April 2012
15:00

Henley Hawks	16 – 16	Richmond
	Report

Dry Leas
Attendance: 675
Referee: Philip Davis

14 April 2012
15:00

(BP) Launceston	33 – 11	Hertford
	Report

Polson Bridge
Attendance: 502
Referee: Nick Williams

14 April 2012
15:00

Lydney	14 – 36	Hartpury College (BP)
	Report

Regentsholme
Attendance: 295
Referee: K White

14 April 2012
15:00

Shelford	17 – 50	Old Albanian (BP)
	Report

The Davey Field
Attendance: 387
Referee: Tom Davis

14 April 2012
15:00

(BP) Southend Saxons	47 – 14	Redruth
	Report

Warners Bridge Park
Attendance: 300
Referee: Bryan Aciero

14 April 2012
15:00

(BP) Westcombe Park	29 – 28	Clifton (BP)
	Report

Goddington Dene
Referee: Paul Kimber

14 April 2012
15:00

(BP) Worthing Raiders	73 – 5	Taunton
	Report

Roundstone Lane
Attendance: 412
Referee: John Healy

=== Round 29 ===
21 April 2012
12:30

(BP) Richmond	33 – 12	Lydney
	Report

Richmond Athletic Ground
Attendance: 696
Referee: Richard Phillips

21 April 2012
14:30

Clifton	14 – 65	Shelford (BP)
	Report

Station Road
Attendance: 100
Referee: Jean Marie Burel

21 April 2012
14:30

(BP) Hartpury College	29 – 3	Southend Saxons
	Report

College Stadium
Attendance: 200
Referee: D Edmunds

21 April 2012
15:00

Barnes	11 – 41	Henley Hawks (BP)
	Report

Barn Elms
Attendance: 250
Referee: Bryan Aciero

21 April 2012
15:00

Hertford	17 – 25	Dings Crusaders
	Report

Highfields
Attendance: 435
Referee: Richard Kelly

21 April 2012
15:00

(BP) Old Albanian	50 – 24	Worthing Raiders (BP)
	Report

Woollam Playing Fields
Attendance: 420
Referee: Rowan Kitt

21 April 2012
15:00

Redruth	21 – 17	Westcombe Park (BP)
	Report

The Recreation Ground
Attendance: 1,004
Referee: Nick Williams

21 April 2012
15:00

(BP) Taunton	10 – 17	Launceston
	Report

Hyde Park
Attendance: 813
Referee: Guy Steel Bodger

=== Round 30 ===
28 April 2012
14:00

Lydney	17 – 8	Barnes
	Report

Regentsholme
Attendance: 530
Referee: Shane Lewis

28 April 2012
14:30

(BP) Dings Crusaders	39 – 18	Taunton
	Report

Landseer Avenue
Attendance: 227
Referee: Tom Davis

28 April 2012
15:00

(BP) Hartpury College	33 – 19	Richmond
	Report

College Stadium
Attendance: 300
Referee: Nick Cockburn

28 April 2012
15:00

(BP) Henley Hawks	52 – 0	Hertford
	Report

Dry Leas
Attendance: 340
Referee: Mike Cooper

28 April 2012
15:00

Launceston	19 – 18	Old Albanian (BP)
	Report

Polson Bridge
Attendance: 894
Referee: Richard Kelly

28 April 2012
15:00

(BP) Shelford	37 – 24	Redruth
	Report

The Davey Field
Attendance: 550

28 April 2012
15:00

(BP) Westcombe Park	27 – 12	Southend Saxons
	Report

Goddington Dene
Attendance: 217
Referee: Sean Davey

28 April 2012
15:00

(BP) Worthing Raiders	54 – 10	Clifton
	Report

Roundstone Lane
Attendance: 462
Referee: Richard Phillips

=== Promotion play-off ===
Each season, the runners-up in the National League 2 South and National League 2 North participate in a play-off for promotion into National League 1. Richmond were runners-up in the South and would host the game as they had a better record in the league in comparison to the North runners up Caldy.

5 May 2012
15:00

Richmond	20 - 13 (a.e.t.)	Caldy

Richmond Athletic Ground
Attendance: 1,600
Referee: Terry Hall

== Total Season Attendances ==
Club	Home Games	Total	Average	Highest	Lowest	% Capacity
Barnes	14 (Note: Missing home attendance v Taunton on 24 September 2011.)	1,398	100	265	40	
Clifton	15	3,189	213	457	60	10%
Dings Crusaders	14 (Note: Missing home attendance v Barnes on 14 April 2012.)	2,430	174	293	105	12%
Hartpury College	14 (Note: Missing home attendance v Barnes on 3 September 2011.)	3,476	248	365	140	12%
Henley Hawks	14 (Note: Missing home attendance v Launceston on 18 February 2012.)	5,545	396	675	225	10%
Hertford	15	5,142	343	456	235	
Launceston	15	9,648	643	1,064	426	21%
Lydney	15	6,115	408	532	215	14%
Old Albanian	15	3,195	213	420	136	21%
Redruth	15	12,622	841	1,258	680	24%
Richmond	15	7,772	518	738	319	12%
Shelford	15	4,575	305	550	188	15%
Southend Saxons	15	2,580	172	300	110	11%
Taunton Titans	13 (Note: Missing home attendances v Richmond on 24 September 2011 and Barnes on 8 October 2011.)	8,657	666	1,640	371	33%
Westcombe Park	14 (Note: Missing home attendance v Clifton 14 April 2012 on 14 April 2012.)	2,977	213	311	132	7%
Worthing Raiders	15	6,119	408	624	302	28%

== Individual statistics ==
- Note that points scorers includes tries as well as conversions, penalties and drop goals. Does not include North - South playoff game.

=== Top Points Scorers ===
Rank	Player	Team	Appearances	Points
1	(Wales) Matthew McLean	Worthing Raiders	30	341
2	(England) Kieron Lewitt	Launceston	29	310
3	(England) Richard Gregg	Old Albanian	26	297
4	(England) Harry Owens	Shelford	30	281
5	(England) James Combden	Henley Hawks	27	273
6	(England) Tony Yapp	Taunton Titans	28	229
7	(England) Thomas Platt	Richmond	20	191
8	(England) Anthony Wicks	Lydney	20	164
9	(England) Luke Giles	Westcombe Park	21	155
10	(England) Aaron Penberthy	Redruth	12	143

=== Top Try Scorers ===
Rank	Player	Team	Appearances	Tries
1	(England) Ian Clark	Hartpury College	21	27
2	(England) Ruben Haile	Taunton Titans	27	25
3	(England) Josh Hannam	Lydney	26	24
3	(England) Alexander Nielsen	Worthing Raiders	29	24
4	(Sweden) Andrew Daish	Old Albanian	25	23
5	(England) Olly Marchon	Old Albanian	22	19
5	(England) Mike Allan	Hertford	27	19
5	(Wales) Matthew McLean	Worthing Raiders	30	19
6	(England) Tom Duncan	Redruth	29	18
7	(Fiji) Taniela Bakoso	Shelford	19	16

== Season records ==
=== Team ===
Largest home win — 68 pts

73 - 5 Worthing Raiders at home to Taunton on 14 April 2012

Largest away win — 39 pts

64 - 25 Hartpury College away to Hertford on 10 September 2011

Most points scored — 80 pts

80 – 31 Worthing Raiders at home to Lydney on 22 October 2011

Most tries in a match — 12

Worthing Raiders at home to Lydney on 22 October 2011

Most conversions in a match — 10

Worthing Raiders at home to Lydney on 22 October 2011

Most penalties in a match — 6 (x2)

Richmond away to Dings Crusaders on 19 November 2011
Westcombe Park away to Dings Crusaders on 14 January 2012

Most drop goals in a match — 1

N/A - multiple teams

=== Player ===
Most points in a match — 30

(Wales) Matthew McLean for Worthing Raiders at home to Lydney on 22 October 2011

Most tries in a match — 4 (x6)

(England) Terry Adams for Old Albanian at home to Taunton on 22 October 2011
(England) Daniel Norton for Hartpury College away to Shelford on 22 October 2011
(England) Ian Clark for Hartpury College away to Southend Saxons on 3 December 2011
(England) Mike Allan for Hertford at home to Lydney on 10 December 2011
(Fiji) Taniela Bakoso for Shelford at home to Dings Crusaders on 21 January 2012
(Fiji) Peceli Nacamavuto for Shelford at home to Lydney on 25 February 2012

Most conversions in a match — 10

(Wales) Matthew McLean for Worthing Raiders at home to Lydney on 22 October 2011

Most penalties in a match — 6 (x2)

(England) Thomas Platt for Richmond away to Dings Crusaders on 19 November 2011
(England) Luke Giles for Westcombe Park away to Dings Crusaders on 14 January 2012

Most drop goals in a match — 1

N/A - multiple players

=== Attendances ===
Highest — 1,640

Taunton Titans at home to Redruth on 10 March 2012

Lowest — 40

Barnes at home to Lydney on 27 August 2011

Highest Average Attendance — 841

Redruth

Lowest Average Attendance — 100

Barnes

== See also ==
- English rugby union system
- Rugby union in England
