= 2012 Premiership Rugby Sevens Series =

2012 J.P Morgan Asset Management Premiership Rugby 7s Series
- Countries: England
- Champions: London Irish 7s (1st title)
- Runners-up: Gloucester 7s
- Matches played: 25
- Tries scored: 173 (average 6.9 per match)

The 2012 Premiership Rugby Sevens Series (styled for sponsorship reasons as the 2012 J.P Morgan Asset Management Premiership Rugby 7s Series) was the third Rugby Union 7-a-side competition for the twelve 2012–13 Aviva Premiership Clubs. It began on Friday July 13 and lasted 4 weeks, with the final at the Recreation Ground on Friday 3 August 2012.

== Format ==
The twelve Premiership Clubs were split into three Groups – A, B and C – with each group playing in a consecutive week in July. Each team in the group played each other once, to the International Rugby Board Laws of the Game - 7s Variations. Based on the result, teams received:

- 4 points for a win
- 2 points for a draw
- 1 bonus point for a loss by seven points or less
- 1 bonus point for scoring four or more tries in a match

Following all the games, the winner and runner up in the group progressed to the final. In the final, the 6 teams (3 Winners and 3 Runners up) were split into 2 pools. Again teams played each other once and points were awarded based on the result. Following the culmination of this stage the winners of each pool progressed to the final, the winner of that game being declared the champions.

== Group stage ==
The group draw was based on geographical positioning of the clubs playing, with the exception of London Welsh, who were swapped for Newcastle Falcons following their successful promotion appeal. Premiership Rugby confirmed the match times at 2pm on 4 July 2012.

Group A	Group B	Group C
Harlequins 7s	Leicester Tigers 7s	Bath 7s
London Irish 7s	London Welsh 7s	Exeter Chiefs 7s
London Wasps 7s	Northampton Saints 7s	Gloucester 7s
Saracens 7s	Sale Sharks 7s	Worcester Warriors 7s

=== Group A ===
Played at The Stoop, Twickenham on Friday 13 July 2012.

Pos	Team	Pld	W	D	L	F	A	TF	TA	TB	LB	Pts
1	Saracens 7s	3	2	0	1	64	26	10	4	1	1	10
2	London Irish 7s	3	2	0	1	74	40	12	6	1	1	10
3	Harlequins 7s	3	2	0	1	56	47	8	7	1	0	9
4	London Wasps 7s	3	0	0	3	19	100	3	16	0	1	1
Green background is the pool winner and qualified for the Final Stage. Blue background is the runner-up and also qualified for the Final Stage. Updated 7 July 2013 — source: Premiership Rugby

13 July 2012
19:30

London Irish 7s	14 – 21	Harlequins 7s

The Stoop

13 July 2012
19:55

London Wasps 7s	12 – 19	Saracens 7s

The Stoop

13 July 2012
20:25

London Wasps 7s	7 – 46	London Irish 7s

The Stoop

13 July 2012
20:50

Harlequins 7s	0 – 33	Saracens 7s

The Stoop

13 July 2012
21:20

London Irish 7s	14 – 12	Saracens 7s

The Stoop

13 July 2012
21:45

London Wasps 7s	0 – 35	Harlequins 7s

The Stoop

=== Group B ===
Was played at Edgeley Park, Stockport on Friday 20 July 2012.

Pos	Team	Pld	W	D	L	F	A	TF	TA	TB	LB	Pts
1	London Welsh 7s	3	3	0	0	117	31	19	5	3	0	15
2	Sale Sharks 7s	3	2	0	1	105	50	17	8	2	0	10
3	Northampton Saints 7s	3	1	0	2	47	94	7	16	1	0	5
4	Leicester Tigers 7s	3	0	0	3	34	128	6	20	1	1	2
Green background is the pool winner and qualified for the Final Stage. Blue background is the runner-up and also qualified for the Final Stage. Updated 7 July 2013 — source: Premiership Rugby

20 July 2012
19:30

London Welsh 7s	31 – 19	Sale Sharks 7s

Edgeley Park

20 July 2012
19:50

Northampton Saints 7s	26 – 24	Leicester Tigers 7s

Edgeley Park

20 July 2012
20:25

Northampton Saints 7s	7 – 34	London Welsh 7s

Edgeley Park

20 July 2012
20:50

Sale Sharks 7s	50 – 5	Leicester Tigers 7s

Edgeley Park

20 July 2012
21:20

London Welsh 7s	52 – 5	Leicester Tigers 7s

Edgeley Park

20 July 2012
21:45

Northampton Saints 7s	14 – 36	Sale Sharks 7s

Edgeley Park

=== Group C ===
Was played at Kingsholm, Gloucester on Thursday 26 July 2012.

Pos	Team	Pld	W	D	L	F	A	TF	TA	TB	LB	Pts
1	Gloucester 7s	3	3	0	0	93	48	15	8	3	0	15
2	Bath 7s	3	2	0	1	71	48	11	8	1	1	10
3	Exeter Chiefs 7s	3	1	0	2	45	79	7	13	1	1	6
4	Worcester Warriors 7s	3	0	0	3	60	94	10	14	2	1	3
Green background is the pool winner and qualified for the Final Stage. Blue background is the runner-up and also qualified for the Final Stage. Updated 7 July 2013 — source: Premiership Rugby

26 July 2012
19:30

Exeter Chiefs 7s	7 – 36	Gloucester 7s

Kingsholm

26 July 2012
19:55

Bath 7s	35 – 12	Worcester Warriors 7s

Kingsholm

26 July 2012
20:25

Bath 7s	19 – 12	Exeter Chiefs 7s

Kingsholm

26 July 2012
20:50

Gloucester 7s	33 – 24	Worcester Warriors 7s

Kingsholm

26 July 2012
21:20

Exeter Chiefs 7s	26 – 24	Worcester Warriors 7s

Kingsholm

26 July 2012
21:45

Bath 7s	17 – 24	Gloucester 7s

Kingsholm

== Final stage ==
The finals were played at The Recreation Ground, Bath on Friday 3 August 2012.

For the finals, the 6 qualified teams were split into two pools of three teams. Scoring remained the same as in the previous rounds (4 points for a win, etc.), and the winner of each pool progressed to the final.

=== Pool A ===
Pos	Team	Pld	W	D	L	F	A	TF	TA	TB	LB	Pts
1	Gloucester 7s	2	2	0	0	34	24	6	4	0	0	8
2	Saracens 7s	2	1	0	1	45	27	7	5	1	1	6
3	Sale Sharks 7s	2	0	0	2	24	52	4	8	0	1	1
Green background is the pool winner and qualified for the Final. Updated 7 July 2013 — source: Premiership Rugby

3 August 2012
19:00

Saracens 7s	33 – 12	Sale Sharks 7s

The Recreation Ground

3 August 2012
19:50

Sale Sharks 7s	12 – 19	Gloucester 7s

The Recreation Ground

3 August 2012
20:40

Saracens 7s	12 – 15	Gloucester 7s

The Recreation Ground

=== Pool B ===
Pos	Team	Pld	W	D	L	F	A	TF	TA	TB	LB	Pts
1	London Irish 7s	2	1	0	1	55	43	9	7	1	0	5
2	London Welsh 7s	2	1	0	1	36	41	6	7	1	0	5
3	Bath 7s	2	1	0	1	38	45	6	7	1	0	5
Green background is the pool winner and qualified for the Final. Updated 7 July 2013 — source: Premiership Rugby

- London Irish 7s qualified for the final with the greatest points difference.

3 August 2012
19:25

London Irish 7s	17 – 29	London Welsh 7s

The Recreation Ground

3 August 2012
20:15

Bath 7s	24 – 7	London Welsh 7s

The Recreation Ground

3 August 2012
21:05

London Irish 7s	38 – 14	Bath 7s

The Recreation Ground

=== Final ===
The final was contested by the winners of the two finals pools.

In a slight difference to the rest of the series, the final was played in two halves of 10 minutes (instead of 7 minutes), with a slightly longer half-time.

3 August 2012
21:40

Gloucester 7s	28 – 31	London Irish 7s

The Recreation Ground
Referee: Luke Pearce

- London Irish 7s won the 2012 Premiership Rugby Sevens Series.
