= 2010–12 European Nations Cup Second Division =

The 2010–12 European Nations Cup Second Division is the third tier rugby union in Europe behind the Six Nations Championship and the 2010–12 European Nations Cup First Division.

The second division comprises four pools (2A, 2B, 2C, and 2D). Teams within each division play each other in a home and away round robin schedule over a two-year period.

At the end of each season a champion is declared, but for relegation and promotion only the two years ranking are considered.

The first in the 2010–2012 ranking of each pool will be promoted while last place teams will be relegated. Winners of pool 2A, will be promoted to division 1-pool B for the 2012–14 edition while the last place team in pool 2A will be relegated to pool 2B. Likewise, winners of 2B will be promoted to 2A, last place in 2B will be relegated to 2C, winner of 2C will be promoted to 2B, last place of 2C will be relegated to 2D, winner of 2D will be promoted to 2C and last place of 2D will be relegated to 3; The winner of 3 replacing the relegated 2D team. Additionally, there will be playoff matches between second place teams and fourth place teams between pools. Winners of these playoffs will determine if additional promotions/relegation occur. There will no playoff between the fourth of 2D and the second of 3.

== Division 2A ==
=== Season 2010–2011 ===
- Table

2010–11 Champions

Place	Nation	Games					Points			Table points
Place	Nation	played	won	drawn	lost	Bonus	for	against	difference	Table points
1	Sweden	4	4	0	0	2	136	77	+59	18
2	Lithuania	4	3	0	1	3	117	47	+70	15
3	Latvia	4	1	0	3	3	77	151	−74	7
4	Malta	4	1	0	3	3	66	80	−14	7
5	Croatia	4	1	0	3	1	53	94	−41	5

- Matches

24 October 2010	Croatia	13–32	Sweden	Split, Croatia
	Try: Jurišić 32'; Con: Mijić 33'; Pen: Mijić 2'; Jurišić 59'	Report	Try: Borg 10'; Daish 15'; Karlsson 45'; Sullivan 70'; Con: Gowland 16'; Arvidsson 46', 71'; Pen: Arvidsson 28'; Gowland 61'	Referee: Tomas Tuma (Czech Republic)

30 October 2010	Latvia	12–14	Croatia	Riga, Latvia

30 October 2010	Lithuania	9–6	Malta	Savivaldybė Stadium, Šiauliai, Lithuania

6 November 2010	Malta	26–33	Latvia	Paola, Malta

6 November 2010	Sweden	26–22	Lithuania	Trelleborg, Sweden
	Try: Arvidsson 21'; Daish 43'; Gowland 59'; Con: Arvidsson 22'; Pen: Arvidsson 7', 18', 66'	Report	Try: Petronis 3'; Grigas 62'; Zibolis 80+'; Con: Astrauskas 63'; Misevicus 80+'; Pen: Marcišauskas 46'	Attendance: 300; Referee: Frank Himmer (Germany)

30 April 2011	Lithuania	57–3	Latvia	Kaunas, Lithuania

30 April 2011	Malta	21–14	Croatia	Paola, Malta

7 May 2011	Croatia	5–10	Lithuania	Split, Croatia

7 May 2011	Sweden	24–13	Malta	Enköping, Sweden
	Try: Eriksson 5'; Wiklund 49'; Youngman 62'; Con: Arvidsson 5', 49', 62'; Pen: Arvidsson 71'	Report	Try: Sacco 59'; Con: O'Brien 59'; Pen: O'Brien 11', 64'	Referee: Vladamir Volovik (Russia)

14 May 2011	Latvia	29–54	Sweden	Riga, Latvia
	Try: Krūmiņš 58'; Skuja 69'; Jauntēvs 76' penalty try 80+'; Con: K. Bērziņš 59', 70', 80+'; Pen: K. Bērziņš 18'	Report	Try: Borg 23', 47'; Nave 28', 42'; T. Johansson 32'; Gowland 40+', 53'; Con: Arvidsson 24', 33', 40+', 43', 54'; Pen: Arvidsson 12', 15', 73'	Referee: Marcin Zeszitek (Poland)

=== Season 2011–2012 ===
- Table

2011–12 Champions

Place	Nation	Games					Points			Table points
Place	Nation	played	won	drawn	lost	Bonus	for	against	difference	Table points
1	Malta	4	3	0	1	1	80	55	+25	13
2	Lithuania	4	2	1	1	4	116	78	+38	13
3	Sweden	4	2	1	1	1	99	73	+26	11
4	Croatia	4	2	0	2	3	109	76	+33	11
5	Latvia	4	0	0	4	0	19	141	−122	0

- Matches

22 October 2011	Lithuania	30–30	Sweden	Kaunas, Lithuania
14:00 UTC+3	Try: Grigas 30', 62', 78'; Misevičius 48'; Con: Marcišauskas 31', 49'; Pen: Marcišauskas 3', 14'	Report	Try: Fransson 29'; Johansson 55'; Con: Fransson 56'; Pen: Fransson 12', 24', 33', 36', 38', 40+'	Referee: Tomas Tuma (Czech Republic)

29 October 2011	Latvia	0–28	Malta	Riga, Latvia
15:00 UTC+3	Try: Collins 40' Holloway R. 45'; Quarendon 47' O'Brien 80'; Con: O'Brien 48'; Pen: O' Brien 3' 58'	Report		Referee: Vadim Pikhovkin (Russia)

29 October 2011	Sweden	24–18	Croatia	Enköping, Sweden
15:00 UTC+2	Try: Blaha 18', Sandberg 26', Pettersson 63'; Con: Fransson 19', 27', 64'; Pen: Fransson 2'	Report	Try: Brown 34', Kumarich 66'; Con: Ayoub 35'; Pen: Ayoub 4', 31'	Referee: Frank Himmer (Germany)

5 November 2011	Malta	14–10	Lithuania	Valletta, Malta
	Try: O'Brien 59'; Pen: O'Brien 45' 55'; Drop: O'Brien 56'	Report	Try: Grigas 40'; Con: Marcisaukas 40'; Pen: Marcisaukas 23'	Referee: Montoya (Spain)

5 November 2011	Croatia	34–8	Latvia	Split, Croatia
	Try: Sekovanec 21', Ayoub 23'; Suta 56' Juresko 59'; Con: Lovreta 22' 24' 57' 60'; Pen: Lovreta 5' 11'	Report	Try: Jakuss 20'; Drop: Kotlevs 9'	Referee: M.Hoyer (Netherlands)

21 April 2012	Malta	22–14	Sweden	Valletta, Malta
	Try: 2 Pen: 4		Try: 2 Con: 2

28 April 2012	Latvia	8–48	Lithuania	Riga, Latvia

28 April 2012	Croatia	31–16	Malta	Zagreb, Croatia

5 May 2012	Sweden	31–3	Latvia	Enköping, Sweden

5 May 2012	Lithuania	28–26	Croatia

=== Table 2010–12 ===
Promoted to division 1B
to play-off
Relegated for 2012–2014

Place	Nation	Games					Points			Table points
Place	Nation	played	won	drawn	lost	Bonus	for	against	difference	Table points
1	Sweden	8	6	1	1	3	235	150	+85	29
2	Lithuania	8	5	1	2	6	233	125	+108	28
3	Malta	8	4	0	4	4	146	135	+11	20
4	Croatia	8	3	0	5	4	162	170	−8	19
5	Latvia	8	1	0	7	3	96	292	−196	7

== Division 2B ==
=== Season 2010–11 ===
- Table

2010–11 Champions

Place	Nation	Games					Points			Table points
Place	Nation	played	won	drawn	lost	Bonus	for	against	difference	Table points
1	Switzerland	4	3	0	1	3	94	37	+57	15
2	Andorra	4	3	0	1	3	98	53	+45	15
3	Slovenia	4	2	0	2	1	75	58	+17	9
4	Serbia	4	2	0	2	1	71	90	−19	9
5	Armenia	0	0	0	4	0	0	100	−100	0

- Matches

2 October 2010	Switzerland	25 – 0 (forfeit)	Armenia	Lausanne, Switzerland
15:00 UTC+2	Try: Guyou 41'; Bjornson 50'; Dubois 55'; Con: Meyer 41', 50' 55'; Pen: Meyer 4', 15', 40'	Report	Try: Bedrossian 19'; Boyadjian 24'; Julliat 71'; Con: Boyadjian 19', 24', 71'; Pen: Boyadjian 9', 45'	Referee: Frank Himmer (Germany)

9 October 2010	Andorra	22–7	Slovenia	Andorra la Vella, Andorra
16:00	Try: Kirikashvili 15' m Canturri 51' m Gagnidze 60' m M. Taurinya 77' c Con: Ahacic (1/4)	Report	Try: Gobec 45' c Con: Burnik (1/1)

23 October 2010	Slovenia	33–3	Serbia	Ljubljana, Slovenia

13 November 2010	Armenia	0 – 25 (forfeit)	Andorra	Abovyan, Armenia

20 November 2010	Serbia	18–15	Switzerland	Belgrade, Serbia

19 February 2011	Andorra	42–25	Serbia	Andorra la Vella, Andorra

19 March 2011	Switzerland	21–9	Andorra	Nyon, Switzerland

30 April 2011	Slovenia	10–33	Switzerland	Ljubljana, Slovenia

7 May 2011	Serbia	25 – 0 (forfeit)	Armenia	Belgrade, Serbia

28 May 2011	Armenia	0 – 25 (forfeit)	Slovenia	Abovyan, Armenia

=== Season 2011–12 ===
- Table

2010–11 Champions

Place	Nation	Games					Points			Table points
Place	Nation	played	won	drawn	lost	Bonus	for	against	difference	Table points
1	Switzerland	4	4	0	0	3	159	40	+119	19
2	Andorra	4	3	0	1	2	70	35	+35	14
3	Serbia	4	2	0	2	3	103	36	+67	11
4	Slovenia	4	1	0	3	1	31	152	−121	5
5	Armenia	4	0	0	4	0	0	100	−100	0

29 October 2011	Serbia	52–0	Slovenia	Roxal, Belgrade, Serbia
				Referee: T. Tuma, (Czech Republic)

12 November 2011	Switzerland	27–19	Serbia	Monthey, Switzerland
				Referee: V. Bouchet, (Norway)

12 November 2011	Slovenia	6–15	Andorra	Stanežiče, Slovenia
				Referee: Mossford (Finland)

26 November 2011	Andorra	21–22	Switzerland	Andorra La Vella
				Referee: Muldoon (Netherlands)

17 March 2012	Switzerland	85–0	Slovenia
	Try: 13; Con: 10

7 April 2012	Andorra	25 – 0 (forfeit)	Armenia

14 April 2012	Armenia	0 – 25 (forfeit)	Switzerland

14 April 2012	Serbia	7–9	Andorra

28 April 2012	Armenia	0 – 25 (forfeit)	Serbia

12 May 2012	Slovenia	25 – 0 (forfeit)	Armenia	Stanežiče, Slovenia

=== Table 2010–2012 ===
Promoted to division 2A
to play-off
Relegated for 2012–2014

Place	Nation	Games					Points			Table points
Place	Nation	played	won	drawn	lost	Bonus	for	against	difference	Table points
1	Switzerland	8	7	0	1	6	253	77	+176	34
2	Andorra	8	6	0	2	5	168	88	+80	29
3	Serbia	8	4	0	4	4	174	126	+48	20
4	Slovenia	8	3	0	5	2	106	210	−104	14
5	Armenia	8	0	0	8	0	0	200	−200	0

== Division 2C ==
=== Season 2010–11 ===
- Table

2010–11 Champions

Place	Nation	Games					Points			Table points
Place	Nation	played	won	drawn	lost	Bonus	for	against	difference	Table points
1	Israel	4	3	0	1	0	77	55	+22	12
2	Denmark	4	2	1	1	1	78	76	+2	11
3	Hungary	4	2	0	2	2	77	65	+12	10
4	Austria	4	2	0	2	1	65	67	−2	9
5	Norway	4	0	1	3	1	31	65	−34	3

- Matches

16 October 2010

Hungary	22–16	Austria

Budapest, Hungary

16 October 2010

Norway	14–14	Denmark

Oslo, Norway

30 October 2010

Israel	23–14	Hungary

Wingate Institute, Netanya, Israel

6 November 2010

Denmark	21–20	Hungary

Odense, Denmark

6 November 2010

Austria	15–9	Norway

Vienna, Austria

9 April 2011

Israel	20–11	Austria

Wingate Institute, Netanya, Israel

7 May 2011

Denmark	27–19	Israel

Odense, Denmark

14 May 2011

Austria	23–16	Denmark

Vienna, Austria

14 May 2011

Norway	3–15	Israel

Oslo, Norway

4 June 2011

Hungary	21–5	Norway

Budapest, Hungary

=== Season 2011–12 ===
- Table

2011–12 Champions

Place	Nation	Games					Points			Table points
Place	Nation	played	won	drawn	lost	Bonus	for	against	difference	Table points
1	Israel	4	4	0	0	2	109	42	+67	18
2	Denmark	4	3	0	1	0	77	55	+22	12
3	Austria	4	1	0	3	4	92	74	+18	8
4	Hungary	4	1	0	3	0	53	117	−64	4
5	Norway	4	1	0	3	0	41	84	−43	4

- Matches

15 October 2011

Denmark	28–5	Norway

Odense, Denmark

22 October 2011

Austria	26–28	Israel

Vienna, Austria

29 October 2011

Hungary	13–21	Denmark

Esztergom, Hungary

29 October 2011

Israel	22–11	Norway

Wingate Institute, Netanya, Israel

5 November 2011

Austria	38–7	Hungary

Vienna, Austria

21 April 2012

Hungary	5–44	Israel

Esztergom, Hungary

21 April 2012

Denmark	28–22	Austria

Odense, Denmark

5 May 2012

Norway	11–6	Austria

Oslo, Norway

19 May 2012

Norway	14–28	Hungary

2 June 2012

Israel	15–0	Denmark

Wingate Institute, Netanya, Israel

=== Season 2010–12 ===
- Table

Promoted to division 2B
to play-off
Relegated to division 2D

Place	Nation	Games					Points			Table points
Place	Nation	played	won	drawn	lost	Bonus	for	against	difference	Table points
1	Israel	8	7	0	1	2	186	97	+89	30
2	Denmark	8	5	1	2	1	155	131	+24	23
3	Austria	8	3	0	5	5	157	141	+16	17
4	Hungary	8	3	0	5	2	130	182	−52	14
5	Norway	8	1	1	6	1	72	149	−77	7

== Division 2D ==
=== Season 2010–11 ===
- Table

2010–11 Champions

Place	Nation	Games					Points			Table points
Place	Nation	played	won	drawn	lost	Bonus	for	against	difference	Table points
1	Cyprus	4	4	0	0	4	208	31	+177	20
2	Bulgaria	4	3	0	1	0	63	95	−32	13
3	Greece	4	1	0	3	3	72	87	−15	7
4	Finland	4	1	0	3	1	41	107	−66	5
5	Luxembourg	4	1	0	3	0	44	108	−64	4

- Matches

15 October 2010

Finland	10–18	Luxembourg

Jyväskylä, Finland

5 November 2010

Bulgaria	25–22	Greece

Pernik, Bulgaria

13 November 2010

Luxembourg	8–18	Bulgaria

Luxembourg

20 November 2010

Greece	13–33	Cyprus

Athens, Greece

12 March 2011

Cyprus	55–8	Bulgaria

Paphos, Cyprus

26 March 2011

Cyprus	70–10	Finland

Paphos, Cyprus

2 April 2011

Greece	30–18	Luxembourg

Athens, Greece

7 May 2011

Luxembourg	0–50	Cyprus

Luxembourg

14 May 2011

Bulgaria	12–10	Finland

Pernik, Bulgaria

11 June 2011

Finland	11–7	Greece

Helsinki, Finland

=== Season 2011–12 ===
2011–12 Champions

Place	Nation	Games					Points			Table points
Place	Nation	played	won	drawn	lost	Bonus	for	against	difference	Table points
1	Cyprus	4	4	0	0	4	266	20	+246	20
2	Greece	4	2	0	2	2	76	100	−24	10
3	Bulgaria	4	2	0	2	0	55	181	−126	9
4	Luxembourg	4	2	0	2	1	64	78	−14	9
5	Finland	4	0	0	4	0	38	120	−82	2

8 October 2011

Cyprus	48–7	Luxembourg

Paphos, Cyprus

22 October 2011

Bulgaria	19–16	Luxembourg

Pernik, Bulgaria

5 November 2011

Greece	47–7	Bulgaria

Thessaloniki, Greece

12 November 2011

Greece	16–6	Finland

Athens, Greece

21 April 2012

Luxembourg	26–3	Finland

Luxembourg

28 April 2012

Bulgaria	3–94	Cyprus

Pernik, Bulgaria

5 May 2012

Luxembourg	15–8	Greece

Luxembourg

26 May 2012

Cyprus	72–5	Greece

Paphos, Cyprus

26 May 2012

Finland	24–26	Bulgaria

Turku, Finland

9 June 2012

Finland	5–52	Cyprus

Helsinki, Finland

=== Table 2010–12 ===
Promoted to Pool 2C
to play-off
Relegated to 3rd division

Place	Nation	Games					Points			Table points
Place	Nation	played	won	drawn	lost	Bonus	for	against	difference	Table points
1	Cyprus	8	8	0	0	8	466	51	+405	40
2	Bulgaria	8	5	0	3	1	118	276	−158	21
3	Greece	8	3	0	5	5	148	187	−39	17
4	Luxembourg	8	3	0	5	1	108	186	−78	13
5	Finland	8	1	0	7	3	79	227	−148	7

- Due to Armenia dropping out of the European Nations Cup, Finland was not relegated to Division 3.

== Promotion/relegation playoffs ==
=== 2A/2B ===
26 May 2012	Andorra	8–44	Croatia	Andorra
	Try: Marc Gispert 2'; Pen: Marc Abello 39'	Report	Try: Marko Bunić 15'; Dominik Draženović 25', 66'; Vlado Ursić 35'; Paško Ivančić 41', 58'; Duje Grubišić 80'; Con: Paško Ivančić (2); Tomislav Gomuzak (1); Pen: Paško Ivančić 54'	Referee: (France) David Rosich

=== 2B/2C ===
9 June 2012	Slovenia	(forfeit)	Denmark

- Slovenia chose to accept relegation to Division 2C and forfeited the match.

=== 2C/2D ===
23 June 2012	Bulgaria	29-26	Hungary

- Due to Armenia dropping out of the European Nations Cup, both teams will play in Division 2C.
