= Fransson =

Fransson is a Swedish surname.

== Geographical distribution ==
As of 2014, 95.6% of all known bearers of the surname Fransson were residents of Sweden (frequency 1:686) and 1.3% of Norway (1:25,712).

In Sweden, the frequency of the surname was higher than national average (1:686) in the following counties:

1. Kronoberg County (1:142)
2. Jönköping County (1:201)
3. Kalmar County (1:215)
4. Blekinge County (1:355)
5. Östergötland County (1:430)
6. Örebro County (1:570)
7. Västra Götaland County (1:607)
8. Västerbotten County (1:613)

== People ==
- Alexander Fransson (born 1994), Swedish professional footballer
- Andreas Fransson (1983–2014), Swedish extreme skier
- Bent Fransson (born 1951), Danish former lightweight rower and rowing coach
- Emma Fransson, Swedish child psychologist and epidemiologist
- Jenny Fransson (born 1987), female freestyle wrestler from Sweden
- Johan Fransson (born 1985), Swedish professional ice hockey defenceman
- Jonas Fransson (born 1980), Swedish professional ice hockey Goaltender
- Josef Fransson (born 1978), Swedish politician
- Kim Fransson (born 1982), Swedish singer songwriter
- Magdalena Fransson (born 1972), Swedish politician
- Mats Fransson (born 1962), Swedish former handball goalkeeper
- Rolf Fransson (1942–2016), Swedish footballer
- Sonja Fransson (born 1949), Swedish politician
- Sten Fransson (1934–2012), Swedish murderer
- Uno Fransson (1927–1995), Swedish discus thrower

== Other ==
- Fransson the Terrible, a 1941 Swedish comedy film
- Åklagaren v Fransson, a decision of the Court of Justice of the European Union (CJEU)
- 13101 Fransson, a minor planet

== See also ==
- Frankston (disambiguation)
