= Criminal Code of Russia =

Prime source of criminal law in Russia

Parliament of Russia
- Citation: 63-ФЗ
- Territorial extent: Russia
- Enacted by: Parliament of Russia
- Signed by: President of Russia
- Signed: June 13, 1996
- Commenced: January 1, 1997
- Status: Amended

The Russian Criminal Code (Russian: Уголовный кодекс Российской Федерации, frequently abbreviated УК РФ) is the prime source of the Law of the Russian Federation concerning criminal offences. The 1996 Criminal Code of the Russian Federation (UGKRF) came into force on January 1, 1997. The new Criminal Code replaced the Soviet analogue of 1960. The main changes deal with economic crimes and property crimes. Most of the other chapters were already amended to correspond to new Russian realities.

On January 8, 1997, President Yeltsin signed the Criminal Correctional Code to regulate the conditions of the sentences. The first Criminal Procedural Code was enacted on December 18, 2001; it has subsequently been amended.

== Synopsis ==
The UGKRF is a declarative document. It begins with in Article 2 a list of "tasks", such as "the protection of the rights and freedoms of man and citizen, property, public order and public security, the environment, and the constitutional system of the Russian Federation against criminal encroachment, the maintenance of peace and security of mankind, and also the prevention of crimes." To accomplish these tasks, the UGKRF "establishes the ground and principles of criminal responsibility, defines which deeds are recognized as offences dangerous to persons, society, or the State, and establishes the types of punishment and other penal measures for the commission of offences." Only the UGKRF determines criminality; that is, only if a person engages in conduct delineated by this statute can s/he be subject to the criminal label, and thereby punished.

As late as 2002 the principle of non bis in idem seemed to apply to Russian criminal law. In 2009 the plaintiff won the case of Zolotukhin v Russia while the European Court of Human Rights still held sway in the country. Russia, having been expelled from the Council of Europe as of March 16, 2022, ceased to be a party to the convention with effect from September 16, 2022 in accordance with Article 58.

According to some orthodox conmparstivists, lawyers in Russia are substantially concerned with the principle of mens rea, although they may not recognize it as such.

The UGKRF establishes criminality for Trafficking in persons (article 127-1) and Rape (article 131).

Article 226.1 deals with "Smuggling of strong, venomous, poisonous, explosive, radioactive substances, radiation sources, nuclear materials, firearms or their main parts, explosive devices". Article 228 concerns "Illegal acquisition, storage, transportation, manufacture, processing of narcotic drugs, psychotropic substances or their analogues, as well as illegal acquisition". Article 228.1 concerns "Illegal production, sale or transfer of narcotic drugs, psychotropic substances or their analogues, as well as illegal sale or transfer of plants containing narcotics". Article 230.1 concerns "Inducing an athlete to use substances and/or methods prohibited for use in sport", while Article 230.2 targets "Use of substances and/or methods prohibited for use in sport against an athlete". Article 234 "Illegal turnover of strong or toxic substances for the purpose of sale".

Article 359 states that "Recruitment, training, financing, or any other material provision of a mercenary, and also the use of him in an armed conflict or hostilities, shall be punishable by deprivation of liberty for a term of four to eight years", so in theory to organize a private military company is in Russia fraught with danger.

== Criminal legislation of the Russian Federation ==
In the Russian Federation, in accordance with paragraph "o" of Article 71 of the Constitution of the Russian Federation, the adoption of criminal legislation is attributed to the exclusive competence of federal state authorities. The authorities of the constituent entities of the Russian Federation do not have the right to adopt acts of criminal legislation.

In accordance with article 105 of the Constitution of Russia, the body authorized to adopt federal laws is the State Duma.

Although the history of Russian criminal law is known for uncodified acts of criminal legislation, since the middle of the XIX century, Russian criminal legislation has been codified. Currently, Russia also has a codified criminal law — the Criminal Code of the Russian Federation, which entered into force on January 1, 1997.

In accordance with part 1 of Article 1 of the Criminal Code, it is the only criminal law to be applied on the territory of Russia. All other laws providing for criminal liability are subject to inclusion in the Criminal Code. Therefore, all legislative acts of this nature are adopted in the form of amendments and additions to the Criminal Code.

The Criminal Code of the Russian Federation is based on the Constitution of Russia, generally recognized principles and norms of international law, as well as on the norms contained in Russia's international legal obligations.

== Structure of the Criminal Code ==
The Code is a codified normative act (code), characterized by internal unity and consisting of two parts (General and Special).

The general part includes 6 sections, 17 chapters and articles 1-104^{5}. Its norms define the general principles and provisions of criminal law, the limits of the criminal law in time and space, the concept and categories of crimes, persons subject to criminal responsibility, the concept of guilt, its forms and types, provisions concerning unfinished criminal activity, complicity in a crime, punishment, its types, purposes and the order of appointment, cases when a person can be released from criminal liability and punishment, the specifics of the criminal liability of minors, the concept and content of other measures of a criminal nature.

The special part of the Code consists of 6 sections, 19 chapters and articles 105-361, and describes the composition of specific crimes, as well as lists sanctions (types and sizes of punishments) for their commission. The system of the Special part of the Criminal Code of Russia reflects the priorities of criminal law protection: crimes against the individual are put in the first place in it, and only then crimes in the field of economics, against public safety and public order, state power, military service, peace and security of mankind.

Criminal law norms are contained in articles of the Code, while one article may contain either one or several criminal law norms. Most of the articles of the code are divided into parts that are separated into a separate paragraph and have a numeric designation (1, 2, 3, etc.). Parts of the articles include paragraphs that have a letter designation. In addition, in some articles of the Special Part of the Code there are notes where criminal law concepts are disclosed or criminal law institutions are formulated.

The Code uses a continuous numbering of articles, chapters and sections. If new articles or chapters are included in the code, the numbering of existing ones does not change, and the added articles or chapters receive the number of the structural unit of the code closest in content with the addition of a digital designation, written with a dot or an upper index: 104.1 or 104^{1}. In case of exclusion of an article, the numbering of other articles also does not change, and a corresponding entry is made in place of the excluded article (Federal Law No. <number>—FZ of DD.MM.YYYY has become invalid).

== The effect of the Criminal Code of Russia in time ==
The procedure for the entry into force of the Criminal Code of Russia is set out in the special federal law "On the Entry into Force of the Criminal Code of the Russian Federation". According to him, the Criminal Code of Russia entered into force on January 1, 1997, with the exception of some provisions. According to art . 4 of this law, certain provisions on punishments are put into effect as soon as the necessary conditions for their execution are created, but no later than a certain period: the norms on punishment in the form of compulsory labor — no later than 2004, on punishment in the form of restriction of freedom — no later than 2005, and on punishment in the form of arrest — no later than 2006.

Federal laws introducing amendments and additions to the Criminal Code of Russia may also specify a special period for their entry into force. If such a deadline is not specified, the general procedure set out in the Federal Law of June 14, 1994 "On the Procedure for the Publication and Entry into Force of Federal Constitutional Laws, Federal Laws, Acts of the Chambers of the Federal Assembly of the Russian Federation" is used. According to it, federal laws come into force simultaneously on the entire territory of the Russian Federation after 10 days after the date of their official publication. The official publication is the first publication of the full text of the law in the "Parliamentary Newspaper", "Rossiyskaya Gazeta", "Collection of Legislation of the Russian Federation" or the first publication on the "Official Internet Portal of Legal Information" (www.pravo.gov.ru ). At the same time, the countdown of the 10-day period begins from the date of publication in the "Parliamentary Newspaper" or "Rossiyskaya Gazeta", or from the date of publication on the "Official Internet Portal of Legal Information" (www.pravo.gov.ru ).

According to Article 9 of the Criminal Code of Russia, the criminality and punishability of an act are determined by the criminal law in force at the time of the commission of this act. At the same time, the time of commission of a crime is recognized as the time of commission of a socially dangerous action (inaction), regardless of the time of the onset of consequences. In continuing crimes, this moment is determined by the moment of the last of the actions, in continuing ones — by the moment of voluntary or compulsory termination of the crime.

As an exception, a criminal law may be retroactive, that is, its effect extends to persons who committed a crime before the entry into force of such a law, including persons serving a sentence or who have served a sentence but have a criminal record. Article 10 of the Criminal Code of Russia establishes that a criminal law that eliminates the criminality of an act, mitigates punishment or otherwise improves the situation of the person who committed the crime has retroactive effect. In no other cases can the criminal law be retroactive, this is prohibited by Article 54 of the Constitution of Russia.

If the new criminal law decriminalizes (recognizes as unapproachable) any act, from the moment of its entry into force, all criminal cases on such an act, for which a preliminary investigation or judicial review is being conducted, should be terminated, and persons already serving sentences for such an act are subject to release. According to Part 2 of Article 10 of the Criminal Code of Russia, if a new criminal law mitigates the punishment for an act that is being served by a person, then this punishment is subject to reduction within the limits provided for by the new criminal law.

The issue of the possibility of applying the retroactive force of the law is controversial if decriminalization occurs due to a change in a normative act of another branch of law to which the Criminal Code makes reference (for example, Traffic Rules). In one of its definitions, the Constitutional Court of Russia gave the following interpretation of the law: "decriminalization of certain acts can be carried out not only by making appropriate changes to criminal legislation, but also by canceling regulatory prescriptions of other industry affiliation, to which the blank norms of the criminal law were referred, or limiting the scope of criminal law regulation as a result of legislative recognition any act that does not pose a public danger, which is peculiar to crimes, and entailing on this basis administrative or other milder responsibility". In another case, the Constitutional Court of Russia found that the provisions on retroactive force relate only to the norms of criminal law, and not to the norms of legislation relating to other branches of law.

In practice, there are cases when, in the period between the commission of a crime and sentencing, the criminal law is changed repeatedly, and the "intermediate" criminal law is milder (up to the decriminalization of the act) than the one in force at the time of the commission of the act or the one in force at the time of sentencing.

Thus, Federal Law No. 420-FZ of December 7, 2011 declared Article 129 of the Criminal Code of the Russian Federation, which provided for liability for libel, invalid from December 8, 2011. Federal Law No. 141-FZ of July 28, 2012 (which entered into force on August 10, 2012) re-introduced liability for libel (Article 128^{1} of the Criminal Code of the Russian Federation). As a result, the law of December 7, 2011 acquired the character of an interim criminal law, which temporarily abolished criminal liability for a crime. A similar situation arose in connection with the entry into force of the Criminal Code of the Russian Federation on January 1, 1997. Part 3 of art. 126 of the Criminal Code ("Abduction of a person") in the wording of this normative act provided for punishment from 5 to 15 years of imprisonment. Article 125^{1} of the Criminal Code of the RSFSR, which was in force until January 1, 1997, provided for a penalty of 10 to 15 years of imprisonment for a similar act with or without confiscation of property, and the wording of Part 3 of Article 126 of the Criminal Code, which entered into force on February 12, 1999, provided for a penalty of 8 to 20 years of imprisonment.

In such a situation, the question arises of the application of the interim criminal law to acts committed before its entry into force, if the sentencing is carried out after the entry into force of the new criminal law. The positions of scientists and judicial practice on this issue are contradictory and unstable. Thus, after the adoption of the Criminal Code of the RSFSR in 1960, both examples of non-application of the interim criminal law and its application were observed in judicial practice; the Supreme Court of the USSR at the same time took the position of non-application of such a law. V. N. Kudryavtsev pointed out that the "interim" law could not be applied, since it was not in effect either at the time of the commission of the crime or during the consideration of the case by the court. The opposite point of view was held by such scientists as L. Zaitsev, I. Tishkevich, I. Gorelik, N. D. Durmanov, Ya. M. Brainin and others.

== The action of the Criminal Code of Russia in space ==
In accordance with Part 1 of Article 11 of the Criminal Code of Russia, it extends its effect to the entire territory of the Russian Federation (the territorial principle of the criminal law in space). The territory of the Russian Federation for the purposes of determining the boundaries of the Criminal Code of Russia includes:

- Land.
- The internal waters of rivers, lakes and other bodies of water located within the State border of Russia.
- Inland sea waters of the Russian Federation located offshore from the baselines from which the width of the territorial sea of the Russian Federation is measured.
- The territorial sea of the Russian Federation is a 12—nautical-mile-wide sea belt adjacent to the land territory or to the internal sea waters, measured from the baselines specified in international legal acts (the low tide line along the coast, etc.).
- The bowels of Russia.
- Russian airspace.
- The continental shelf of Russia.
- Exclusive Economic Zone of Russia.

On the territory of the continental shelf, Russia's criminal jurisdiction does not extend to the waters and airspace covering it and, in this regard, is carried out only with respect to crimes related to the violation of the regime of this territory (including those relating to artificial objects located on them: drilling rigs, artificial islands, underwater cables). The situation is similar to the exercise of criminal jurisdiction on the territory of the exclusive economic zone: it applies only to acts related to the illegal creation of security zones in it and the use of its natural resources.

The Criminal Code of Russia also applies to crewed objects launched by the Russian Federation into outer space, water and aircraft under the flag or with the identification marks of Russia assigned to a port or airport of Russia, located in the open sea or open airspace, as well as naval ships and military aircraft located under the flag or identification marks of Russia (regardless of their location).

International law establishes restrictions on the exercise of Russia's criminal jurisdiction over crimes committed on board ships flying the flag of foreign States located within the territorial sea of Russia and aircraft of such States located within the airspace of Russia. Art. 27 of the UN Convention on the Law of the Sea of December 10, 1982 establishes that the jurisdiction of the coastal State applies only to cases when the consequences of the crime extend to the coastal State, or the crime violates the peace of the country or good order in the territorial sea, or if the ship's captain or a diplomatic (consular) representative of the flag State requests assistance to the local authorities, or if these measures are necessary to curb the illicit trafficking of narcotic or psychotropic drugs.

The Tokyo Convention on Crimes and Certain Other Acts Committed on Board Aircraft of 1963 establishes that with respect to crimes committed on board aircraft of other States located in territorial airspace, criminal jurisdiction is exercised only if the crime has consequences on the territory of the State, or is committed by a citizen (resident) or against a citizen (resident) of such a state, or is directed against the security of the state, or is associated with a violation of the rules of air flights, or if intervention is required to fulfill the international obligations of this State.

Thus, the law of the flag State applies to all other crimes committed on board aircraft and ships. The same applies to Russian ships and aircraft located within the territorial sea and airspace of foreign states.

International law may establish exceptions from the territorial criminal jurisdiction of Russia. One of the most well-known such exceptions is diplomatic and consular immunity.

The Criminal Code of Russia also extends its effect to Russian citizens and stateless persons permanently residing in Russia who have committed a crime on the territory of a foreign state, provided that there is no court decision of that state (the principle of citizenship) in respect of them, as well as to military personnel of Russian military units stationed outside Russia (unless otherwise provided an international agreement). The application of liability measures in this case (in accordance with the amendments made to the Criminal Code of Russia in 2006) is not dependent on whether the committed act is considered a crime in a foreign state (Article 12 of the Criminal Code of Russia).

Foreign citizens and stateless persons who are not residents of Russia are also liable under the Criminal Code of Russia if the crime committed by them is directed against the interests of Russia or its citizens or residents (the real principle of operation of the criminal law), or responsibility for this act is provided for by an international treaty of the Russian Federation (the universal principle of operation of the criminal law).

== Modifications ==
=== 2013 ===
Was modified in October 2013 Article 208, outlawing the "Organization of, or Participation in, Illegal Armed Units" in foreign countries. The penalty is a six-year incarceration.

=== 2022 ===
In March 2022, the Russia fake news law was added to the criminal code, as Article No. 207.3, titled "Public dissemination of knowingly false information about the use of the Armed Forces of the Russian Federation." The new law provides for a prison sentence of up to 15 years for knowingly disseminating false information about the Russian Armed Forces. The Washington Post interpreted section 207.3 to have the effect of criminalising the use of the term "invasion" to describe the 2022 Russian invasion of Ukraine, and forcing journalists and citizens using online social networks to use the official term "special military operation" to refer to the invasion.

On 13 December occurred the first reading of a bill in the State Duma that would remove criminal liability for actions by Russian forces and their proxies in the occupied territories of Ukraine so long as said crimes were committed 'aimed at protecting the interests of the Russian Federation'.

== See also ==
- Civil Code of Russia
- Offences Code of Russia
