= Andrew Daish =

Swedish international rugby union footballer

Andrew Kalen Daish
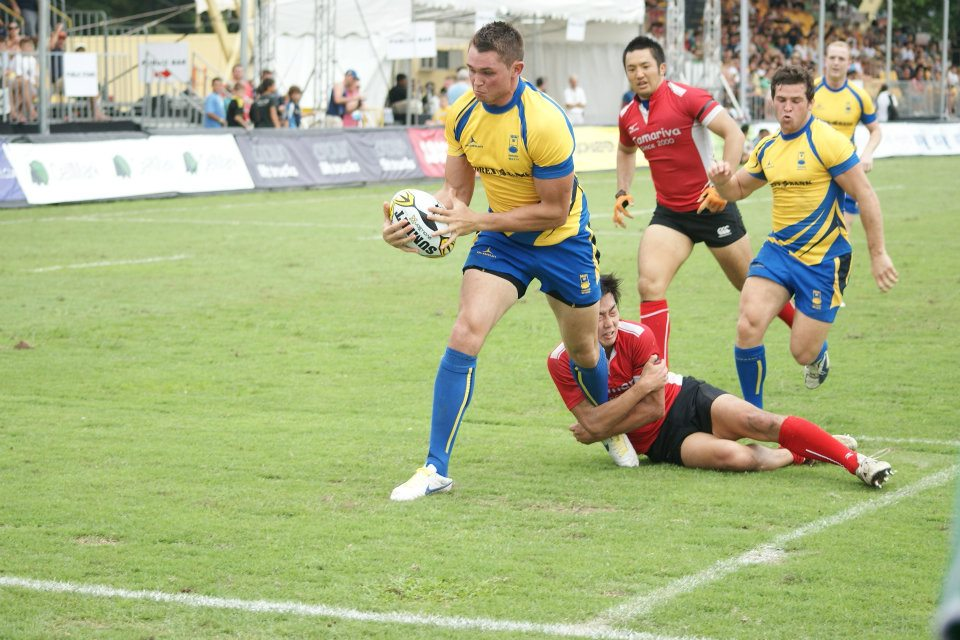
- Born: Andrew James Kalen Daish; September 6, 1984 (age 42) Welwyn Garden City, Hertfordshire England
- Height: 1.94 m (6 ft 4 1/2 in)
- Weight: 98 kg (216 lb)
- School: Verulam School, St Albans
- University: London South Bank University; Birmingham University

Rugby union career
- Position: Back Row
Amateur team(s)
Years	Team	Apps	(Points)
- Old Albanian RFC
Senior career
Years	Team	Apps	(Points)
2005-07	London Welsh	8	(10)
2007-09	Pertemps Bees	31	(45)
2008-09	Rugby Lions (loan)	1	(0)
2009-10	Nuneaton	14	(5)
2010-	Old Albanian	102	(185)
- Correct as of 25 April 2015
International career
Years	Team	Apps	(Points)
2009-	Sweden	30	(35)
- Correct as of 14 December 2015
National sevens team
Years	Team		Comps
2009-2013	Sweden		FIRA 7s

Andrew James Kalen Daish (born 6 September 1984) is a Swedish rugby union player of Welsh parentage as well as playing for Old Albanian as part of the back row.

He started playing at the age of six for Old Albanians, and represented Hertfordshire at U12, U14, U16 and U18. He also represented London and South East Division at U16, Wales Youth (U18) and Wales Schools (U18) and Wales U19 (development), and was Rugby Captain at Verulam School, St Albans.

== Rugby Union Career ==
=== Youth career ===
Andrew was born in Welwyn Garden City, Hertfordshire, England. He started playing rugby union at the age of six for Old Albanian, based in St Albans, and represented Hertfordshire at U12, U14, U16 and U17 level. He also represented London and South East Division at U16, Wales Youth (U18), Wales Schools (U18), Wales U19 and was captain of his school side at Verulam School, St Albans.

=== Club career ===
Andrew's introduction to senior rugby began at London Welsh, then in National Division One, for the 2005-06 season, while studying at London South Bank University for a degree in Sports and Exercise Science. He spent two seasons at Welsh where he was a fringe player and upon successful completion of his degree, he gained a place to study for a Post Graduate Certificate in Education at Birmingham University. At this time he was recommended to local side, Pertemps Bees, also playing in National Division One and he was made part of their squad for the 2007-08 season.

In his debut season with the Bees Andrew had far more opportunities than with his previous club, making 25 league appearances, winning the fans’ most promising player award, as well as being the leading try scorer at the club with eight tries and was also named in the Birmingham Post's Midland Select XV. Unfortunately, his performances and tries were not enough to keep the Bees up and the side were relegated at the end of the season, dropping to National Division Two. The next season was not so successful for Andrew as he was unable to break into the Pertemps Bees first team and had limited opportunities in a side that claimed promotion from the 2008–09 National Division Two as league champions, spending part of the season in National Division 3 South with Rugby Lions. Due to a lack of games at the Bees, Andrew moved across the Midlands to nearby Nuneaton who had just gained promotion to National Division Two for the 2009-10 season. He failed to make much impact at the Nuns, making only 14 appearances (half of which were from the bench), as the club failed to stay in the division and were relegated by the end of the season.

After several disappointing seasons, Andrew decided to move back to Hertfordshire, dropping down a division to National League 2 South to play for his youth club, Old Albanian. He had a good first season with the St Albans club, becoming a regular in the newly promoted side and helping them to a very respectable 6th place in the league for the 2010-11 season. The next year was even better as Andrew had the best season of his career so far, finishing as the club's top scorer (and one of the league's best) with 23 tries, propelling Old O's to the 2011–12 National League 2 South league title ahead of fancied Richmond and promotion to National League 1 - the highest division the club have played in since they entered the league system. Andrew has become a regular at Old Albanian, who after several years in National League 1 were relegated at the end of the 2014-15 season, returning to National League 2 South.

=== International career ===
Although he started his international career at youth level for Wales, Andrew has since represented the Sweden National Rugby Union Team having been made eligible by his grandfather. He has been capped 20 times with 7 tries as of 2015 and he also has captained the sevens side. In 2012 he helped the country to gain promotion to European Nations Cup First Division after they won the second division title.

== Honours ==
Pertemps Bees

- Pertemps Bees fans 'Most Promising Player Award': 2008-09
- Birmingham Post Midland Select XV: 2008-09
- Part of squad that were National Division Two champions: 2009-10

Old Albanian

- National League 2 South champions: 2011-12

Sweden

- European Nations Cup Second Division champions: 2012
