= Stanežiče =

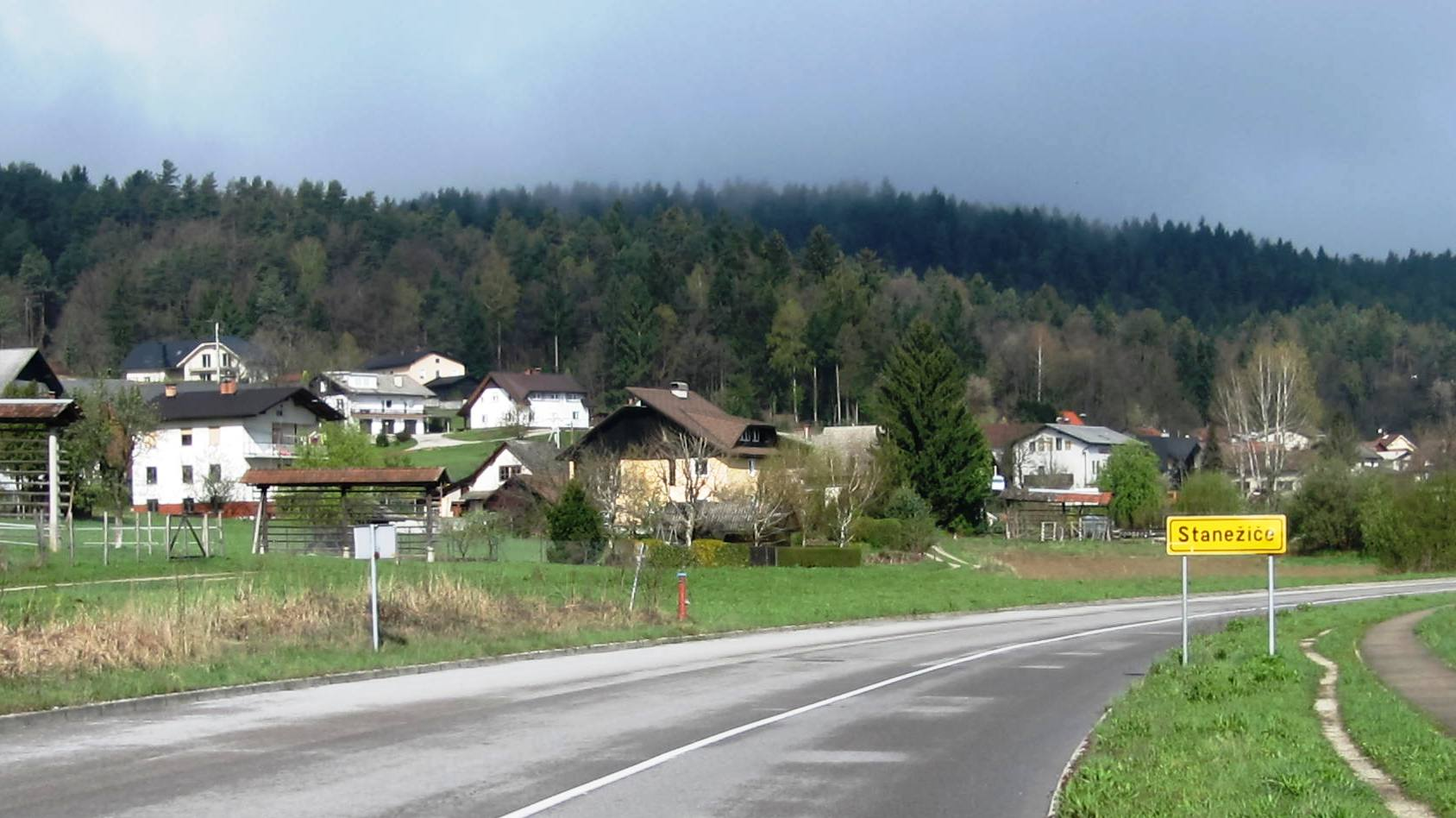
- Stanežiče

- Location in Slovenia
- Coordinates: 46°6′43.44″N 14°26′2.9″E
- Country: Slovenia
- Traditional region: Upper Carniola
- Statistical region: Central Slovenia
- Municipality: Ljubljana

Area
  - Total: 1.84 km^{2} (0.71 sq mi)
- Elevation: 337.2 m (1,106 ft)

Population (2002)
  - Total: 670
  - Density: 360/km^{2} (940/sq mi)
- Postal code: 1210

Stanežiče (pronounced [ˈstaːnɛʒitʃɛ]; German: Staneschitz) is a settlement in the City Municipality of Ljubljana in central Slovenia. It lies just northwest of Ljubljana and is part of the traditional region of Upper Carniola. It is now included with the rest of the municipality in the Central Slovenia Statistical Region.

The local church is dedicated to Saint James (Slovene: sveti Jakob) and belongs to the Parish of Šentvid. The bell tower was built in 1681, the nave and cloistered presbytery in 1721, and the barrel-vaulted narthex in 1794. The main altar was created by Matevž Tomec in 1856. There are four side altars in the church, dedicated to the Descent from the Cross and Saint Florian (both 1739), and to Saint Peregrine and Saint Lucy (both renovated in 1934).

== Gallery ==
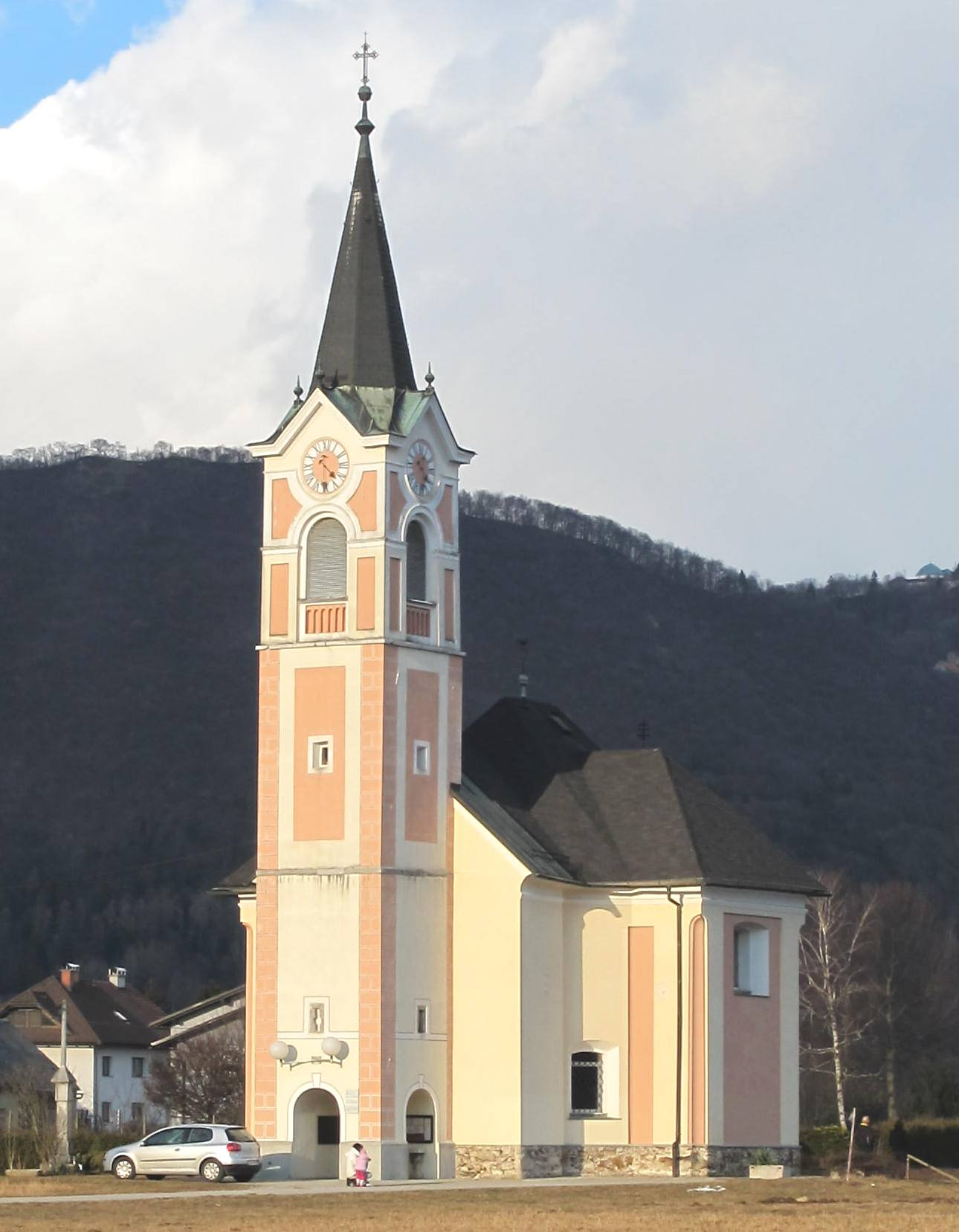
St. James' Church in Stanežiče

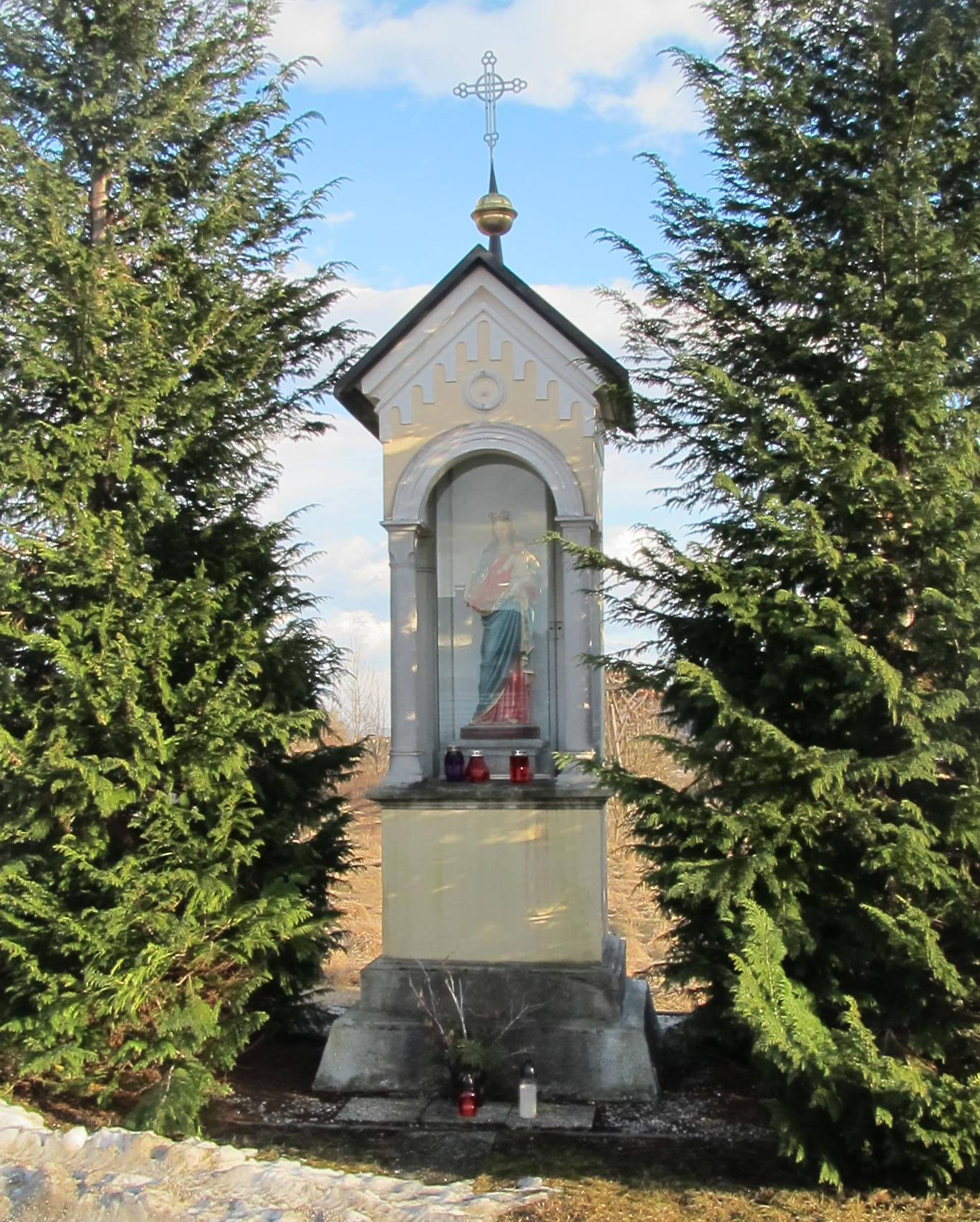
Wayside shrine in Stanežiče
