= Non bis in idem =

No legal action can be instituted twice for the same cause

Non bis in idem (sometimes rendered non-bis in idem or ne bis in idem), which translates literally from Latin as 'not twice in the same [thing]', is a legal doctrine to the effect that no legal action can be instituted twice for the same cause of action. It is a legal concept originating in Roman civil law, but it is essentially the equivalent of the double jeopardy doctrine found in common law jurisdictions, and similar peremptory plea (autrefois acquit/convict, 'previously acquitted/convicted') in some modern civil law countries.

The International Covenant on Civil and Political Rights guarantees the right to be free from double jeopardy; however, it does not apply to prosecutions by two different sovereigns (Note: For example, see A.P. v Italy, UN HRC CCPR/C/31/D/204/1986) (unless the relevant extradition treaty or other agreement between the countries expresses a prohibition). The Rome Statute of the International Criminal Court employs a modified form of non bis in idem.

== Rome Statute and ad hoc UN tribunals ==
The Rome Statute establishing the International Criminal Court (ICC) states that the non bis in idem principle has a peculiar meaning, especially in comparison to European supranational law. The ICC jurisdiction is complementary to national law, and Article 20 of the Rome Statute specifies that even if the principle remains in general terms, it cannot be taken in consideration if there is unwillingness or incapability of the existence of the supranational court's jurisdiction.

Article 10 of the ICTY Statute and Article 9 of the ICTR Statute both state that the principle can be enforced mainly to clarify that the ad hoc tribunal's sentences are "stronger" than the ones in domestic courts.

In other words, national courts cannot proceed against the responsible parties of crimes within the tribunal's jurisdiction if the international tribunal has already pronounced sentence for the same crimes. However, the ICTY and the ICTR can judge alleged criminals already sentenced by national courts if both of the following occur:

- the sentence defined the crimes as "ordinary".
- the judiciary of the state is not considered impartial or the domestic trial is considered to be a pretense to protect the accused from the legal action of international justice or is considered to be unfair on some fundamental legal basis.

== European Court of Human Rights ==
=== Legal Framework ===
The legal basis for the non bis in idem principle in the European Court of Human Rights (ECtHR) is Article 4 of Protocol No. 7 to the European Convention on Human Rights. Section 1 of Article 4 outlines the procedure relevant to rights against being prosecuted or punished twice in criminal proceedings. Thus, trials involving breaches of non bis in idem can only be commenced contingent on the criminal nature of the tried act, the duplication of proceedings seen via the bis concept, and the same offense seen via the idem concept—as discussed infra. Questions pertaining to the scope of non bis in idem have been developed relevant to administrative and tax affairs, which sometimes are not tried under criminal courts at the national level despite their “criminal nature.” Accordingly, Section 2 of Article 4 establishes the right for the accused to present newly discovered evidence to higher tribunal for review. While there exist guarantees against punishment or prosecution twice under the ECHR, post-trial discovery can warrant a change in the outcome of a case. This also includes significant procedural errors that may affect the fairness or outcome of a case. However, reopening a case through the ECtHR can only occur when critical pieces of evidence were not sufficiently adduced or discussed, necessitating a referral to the Grand Chamber. Finally, Section 3 of Article 4 prevents the full protections of non bis in idem under the conditions of Article 15 of the Convention, which includes during war and times of national public emergencies.

=== Engel Criteria ===
To determine the criminality of an offense in non bis in idem, the Court refers to the “Engel criteria,” taken from its judgment in Engel and Others v. Netherlands App no. 5100/71; 5101/71; 5102/71; 5354/72; 5370/72 (ECtHR, 8 June 1976). This is critical to assess when penalties that are not considered criminal at the national scale should be treated as “criminal” for the purposes of invoking non bis in idem protections. The three criteria are as follows to determine if a penalty is of “criminal nature”: (1) the national classification of the offense, (2) the criminal nature of the offense, and (3) the severity of the penalty. If penalties are primarily intended to compensate for the shortfall and encourage future compliance, they may not be considered criminal according to the severity and purpose principles of the Engel Criteria—as seen in certain cases related to tax withholding. Through the application of these criteria, the ECtHR can ensure that states do not circumvent human rights protections through non-criminal punitive measures at the national level and harmonize criminal proceedings at the ECtHR.

=== The Criminal Nature Requirement ===
==== Kremzow v. Austria App no. 16417/90 (ECtHR, 7 November 1990) ====
Since considerable cases that have reached the ECtHR have involved applicants with both criminal offenses along with disciplinary proceedings, non bis in idem has become a principal issue when assessing if the disciplinary proceedings also have reached a criminal nature. In Kremzow, the applicant, who was a retired judge sentenced for murder and unlawful possession of a firearm, appealed to the ECtHR based on the “criminal nature” of his disciplinary proceedings. These disciplinary penalties included the deprivation of his former privileges as a judge, such as his pension rights. Thus, he claimed that his rights relevant to Article 6 of the ECHR were violated, implying that the Engel criteria were relevant in raising his disciplinary proceedings. If the Court deemed the disciplinary charges criminal in nature, his rights under non bis in idem would be violated.

Ultimately, the ECtHR concluded that application was inadmissible and upheld the indictment decided by the Vienna Court of Appeal acting as Disciplinary Court (Oberlandesgericht als Disziplinargericht). The ECtHR decided that the disciplinary proceedings did not reach a criminal level according to the Engel Criteria, thus not constituting a break of Article 6. Regarding the national standards of the Engel Criteria, while the ECtHR agreed that Kremzow had separate criminal charges, the disciplinary consequences were distinguished, and the Disciplinary Court did not “convict” him for the aforementioned criminal charges. Thus, the duty of the Disciplinary Court in Austria was tasked with dealing with the repercussions of Kremzow’s actions as a defendant but also as a civil servant. Since the disciplinary proceedings were treated as a separate matter from his criminal penalties, non bis in idem was not applicable in Kremzow’s case.

==== Ruotsalainen v. Finland App no. 13079/03 (ECtHR, 16 June 2009) ====
Ruotsalainen tested the scope of non bis in idem relevant to the criminal nature of national administrative proceedings and penalties. The applicant, a Finnish national, was stopped by the police in 2001 during a road check when police found Ruotsalainen to be driving with leniently taxed fuel that was illegal given his type of vehicle. Thereafter, he was charged for petty tax fraud due to the illegally cheaper fuel alongside his admission to refueling the vehicle himself. Ruotsalainen was charged the difference between the tax in administrative proceedings brought against him from the same event. When domestic authorities refused to grant a reduction in the tax charge, Ruotsalainen brought the case before the ECtHR. According to his complaint, he cited that his rights pursuant to Article 4 of Protocol No. 7 were breached since he was penalized twice for the fuel tax offense.

The ECtHR decided that both penalties imposed upon Ruotsalainen were criminal in nature with the first contingent upon the classification of Finnish criminal law and the second, although administrative technically, had a “criminal nature” due to its intent to punish and dissuade a repeated offense. While both penalties were handled separately, they converged towards the same criminal subject matter. Thus, the Court concluded that there had been a violation of non bis in idem according to Article 4 of Protocol No. 7.

=== The ‘Bis’ (Duplication of Proceedings) Requirement ===
==== A and B v. Norway [GC] App nos. 24130/11 and 29758/11 (ECtHR, 15 November 2016) ====
A and B was a landmark case since it established the “substance and time connection” requirement relevant to assessing a duplication of proceedings in non bis in idem. The two applicants, represented through aliases Mr. A and Mr. B, were charged for failing to report taxes. The first applicant—Mr. A—was indicted for violating section 12-1(1) of the Tax Assessment Act of 1980 (ligningsloven) for failing to declare tax transactions with Software Innovation AS in 2008. In 2009, following his failure to pay an outstanding tax due without an appeal, the Follo District Court (tingrett) convicted Mr. A of aggravated tax fraud, sentencing him to a year’s imprisonment due to his failure to declare. The second applicant—Mr. B—similarly failed to declare his tax return for the tax year 2002 but was given an amendment to his tax assessment and penalty in 2008 by the Tax Administration under the criminal investigation. While the second applicant paid the tax due along with the penalty, the public prosecutor indicted him for violating section 12-1 as well given his failure to declare his full income on his tax return in 2002. Like Mr. A, Mr. B was charged for aggravated tax fraud and sentenced to a year’s imprisonment in 2009. Given the criminal and tax penalties of their respective cases, the two applicants contended that their rights relevant to non bis in idem were violated according to Article 4 of Protocol No. 7 ECHR.

The primary task of the ECtHR was to examine whether the invocation of section 12-1(1) of the Tax Assessment Act and the aggravated tax fraud charge were both criminal, which would jeopardize the protections of Mr. A and Mr. B. First, the ECtHR acknowledged that due to the optional ratification of Article 4 of Protocol No. 7 ECHR, the Court generally had to acknowledge national sensitivities to defining the “criminal nature” of an act. This reiterated the first principle of the Engel criteria. Secondly, the Court addressed the chronology of the two proceedings and found that a “final decision” resulting from a single proceeding was irrelevant when there did not exist a duplication of proceedings. Instead, this would constitute a combination of proceedings, meaning they were complementary. Finally, to avoid misinterpreting administrative proceedings that were criminal in nature, the ECtHR would assess the proceedings’ compliance with Article 4 through a single-track procedure onwards, which could enable “parallel strands of legal regulation” with the national government.

Since the Court separated the criminal and administrative procedures of the case, non bis in idem could only be violated in dual proceedings when there existed “complementary responses to socially offensive conducts” that were integrated in a way to demonstrate a “coherent whole” of indictments from the original criminal and administrative facets of the penalties. Moreover, A and B set the precedent of requiring “sufficiently close connection in substance and in time” between proceedings according to the bis principle, or duplication of proceedings. The substance and the chronological closeness of proceedings were not intended to be mutually exclusive but to be assessed conjunctively to justify the relevance of both cases and guarantee the protections of individuals from unduly delay over prolonged proceedings. The Court ruled in both applicants’ cases that their respective criminal and administrative proceedings had proportionate and foreseeable cumulative penalties. Thus, the Court ruled there had not been a violation of non bis in idem according to Article 4 of Protocol No. 7.

==== Marguš v. Croatia [GC] App no. 4455/10 (ECtHR, 27 May 2014) ====
Marguš was a Grand Chamber judgment that dealt with an alleged duplication of criminal offenses under a change in international war crimes law. The applicant, a Croatian national, was tried by the Osijek Military Prosecutor in 1993 on the grounds of serious offense against civilians through the Croatian army in 1991. However, with the establishment of the General Amnesty Act in 1996, which applied to criminal offenses from the Yugoslav Wars other than crimes against humanity, charges brought against Marguš were dropped. However, in 2007, the Supreme Court of Croatia decided that the termination of the proceedings was in fact in violation of the General Amnesty Act. This was due to the severity of Marguš’ actions during the war—killing four persons and seriously wounding a child—on top of his cited offenses as a member of the reserve forces following his duty. Accordingly, the Supreme Court ruled that amnesty could not be granted, leading him to be tried and imprisoned for war crimes. Subsequently, Marguš appealed to the Supreme Court, which upheld the conviction on the grounds that the second set of proceedings dealt with a broader scope since a Geneva Convention violation was applied. Thus, Marguš brought his application to the ECtHR in 2009 on the grounds of his rights under Article 6 to a fair trial and Article 4 to not be tried or punished twice were violated such that the subject of the 1997 and 2007 proceedings were the same.

While the Court found there to be no violation of Article 6 given the lack of proof of the judge’s partiality in initial proceedings, the Court found that the invocation of Article 4 of Protocol No. 7 to be non-applicable. The Court did acknowledge that both sets of proceedings handled the same offense. Yet, the Court noted that contemporary granting of amnesties for war crimes was unacceptable and that the decisions taken in Croatia aligned with the fundamentals in the Convention—Article 2 (right to life) and Article 3 (prohibition of degrading treatment and torture). Thus, the renewed indictment against Marguš concerning war crimes was compliant to Article 2 and 3 and Article 4 of Protocol No. 7 was inherently out of the scope of the case and hence not applicable.

=== The ‘Idem’ (The Same Offense) Requirement ===
==== Gradinger v. Austria App no. 15963/90 (ECtHR, 23 October 1995) ====
In Gradinger, the applicant faced criminal and administrative punishment based on the same offense but at a regional and national level. The applicant was convicted of driving under the influence and death by negligence, resulting in fines and imprisonment first under Article 81 of the Criminal Code and then Section 5 of the Road Traffic Act in Austria. After failing to appeal his convictions under the non bis in idem principle in the Austrian legal system, Gradinger brought an appeal to the ECtHR citing a violation of Article 4 of Protocol No. 7 on the premise that the administrative and criminal proceedings pursued against him were based on identical facts from the same offense.

The Court determined that despite the administrative action in the procedures, they were criminal in nature based on the fact that Gradinger’s fine was accompanied with a prison sentence contingent on his default on payment. Thus, Gradinger’s case fulfilled the initial prong of the Engel criteria and could be assessed for potential violations of the dual-track criminal and administrative sentence. Due to the inherently criminal nature of the two proceedings regarding the same offense, the Court determined that his rights under Article 4 of Protocol No. 7 were violated.

==== Zolotukhin v. Russia App no. 14939/03 (ECtHR, 10 February 2009) ====
Zolotukhin was a landmark case brought before the Grand Chamber of the ECtHR, which broadened the idem—or same offense principle—and harmonized the procedural laws for multiple prosecutions in contracting states in the CoE. It also established the precedent of “criminal procedure” in Article 4 of Protocol No. 7 to take into account broader application related to “criminal charge” of Article 6 and “penalty” of Article 7. Since Zolotukhin, both the CJEU and the ECtHR have broadened the usage of non bis in idem related to charges and procedures with the same offenses regardless of their national legal assessment.

The applicant, Sergey Zolotukhin, served as a Russian soldier and took his girlfriend into military property without permission, acted threateningly, and used obscene insulting language toward the police officers who arrested him in 2002. On 4 January 2002, the Gribanovskiy District Court, where he was first tried, found Zolotukhin guilty of an administrative offense under Article 148 of the Code of Administrative Offenses of the Russian Soviet Federative Republic (RSFSR). Following, on 23 January 2002, the District Court tried him in a criminal case, which cited him violating Article 213 § 2(b) of the Criminal Code of the Russian Federation for “disorderly acts, including resisting a public official dealing with a breach of public order.” While the Russian Constitution provides a clause pursuant to protections against re-trials under Article 50 § 1, the penalties brought against Zolotukhin were an administrative charge under minor disorderly acts and a criminal charge, constituting separate offenses in Russia’s dual-track system. However, Zolotukhin complained that the detention tied to his disorderly acts and his criminal sentence culminated in double penalty under the same offense, breaching his rights under Article 4 Protocol No. 7.

The Court similarly decided that despite the initial administrative proceedings, the guilty finding and detention under the Code of Administrative Offenses constituted a “criminal nature,” satisfying the first of the Engel criteria. In this landmark case, the Court decided to synthesize approaches it had used in past to determine whether the same offense had been invoked in Zolotukhin. These approaches included whether the lower courts had penalized the applicant for the “same conduct” (idem factum) seen in Gradinger, whether the lower courts had produced several offenses in separate proceedings from the same conduct (concours ideal d’infractions) seen in Oliveira, and whether there existed “essential elements” in both proceedings seen in Franz Fischer. The Court decided to change its approach toward the interpretation of “offense” according to Article 4 of Protocol No. 7, favoring a broader, liberal approach. From Zolotukhin, the presiding judges commented that limiting the scope of the offenses based on different legal classification undermined the rights of the individual guaranteed under Article 4. Moreover, the Court found that the administrative judgment was autonomously and inherently final when criminal proceedings began a week after against Zolotuhkin. As noted, the Russian legal system did not recognize a breach in the non bis in idem principle relevant to Zolotukhin since both proceedings were not legally classified as criminal. Thus, the Court ruled that there had been a violation of Zolotukhin’s rights under Article 4 of Protocol No. 7. Since Zolotukhin, the ECtHR has revolutionized its approach to determining the criminal nature of multiple offenses in contracting states with dual-track procedures such as Russia.

== Court of Justice of the European Union ==
=== Legal Framework ===
The legal basis for the non bis in idem principle for the Court of Justice of the European Union (CJEU) is Article 50 of the EU Charter of Fundamental Rights, which is applicable in all member states. Since the scope of the Charter is relevant to EU member states, cases related to cross-border double jeopardy and third-party affairs are clarified under Article 54 of the Convention Implementing the Schengen Agreement (CISA) and Article 3(2) of the European Arrest Warrant Framework Decision (EAW FD) respectively. When cases pertain to a duplication of proceedings or penalties between several member states, especially pertaining to extradition, CISA and EAW become critical instruments, as discussed infra. Moreover, given the judicial framework of the EU, the CJEU has the potential to invoke direct effect via non bis in idem, altering the fundamental approach to member states discretion in related proceedings. Granted certain exceptions, the wording and scope of the non bis in idem principle are identically applied to the corresponding fundamental right in Article 4 of Protocol No. 7 under the ECHR. For example, the criteria to determine violations of non bis in idem in the CJEU includes instruments from the ECtHR such as the Engel criteria, which is employed in the ECtHR to determine the criminal nature of a penalty. Conversely, the major exception between the two courts is the decision-making in cross-border proceedings, in which ECtHR rulings may only apply within a given State while CJEU rulings may apply across relevant contracting states. Moreover, since the EU derives its legal functioning from legal cooperation mechanisms within the member states, it maintains more flexibility in its interpretation of non bis in idem.

=== The Criminal Nature Requirement ===
==== Case C-617/10, Åklagaren v. Hans Åkerberg Fransson (2013) ====
In Åkerberg Fransson, the non bis in idem principle in Article 50 of the Charter was tested if it could be invoked to prevent criminal proceedings for tax evasion contingent on an existing administrative tax penalty. Accordingly, Fransson was tried in Sweden by tax authorities on the grounds that he falsified his value added tax and income tax. Thus, he had been fined by the Swedish government with administrative tax penalties. Subsequently, Fransson was tried for failing to report sizable employer’s contributions in taxes, culminating to a criminal offense due to the copious amounts of money not reported and the significant impact of his failure to declare. Accordingly, Fransson brought the matter to the Court on the grounds that his rights to not be tried and punished twice for a criminal offense had been violated according to Article 50 of the Charter and Article 4 of Protocol No. 7 ECHR. By doing so, he implied that the initial administrative tax penalty was criminal in nature, subjecting him to trial and punishment twice.

In response, the CJEU concluded that Article 50 of the Charter was not breached since the initial tax penalty did not constitute a criminal penalty and left the discretion to the national court. Firstly, the CJEU posited that an invocation of Article 50 necessitated the main proceeding to be of criminal nature, which contested Fransson’s petition. Second, the CJEU emphasized that Article 50 can treat administrative penalties and criminal penalties exclusively for the same cited act so long as the administrative penalty does not reach criminal consequences. Finally, like the ECtHR has determined in matters in non bis in idem contingent on the criminal nature of a proceeding, Fransson additionally relied on the Engel criteria, which it failed to demonstrate. Ultimately, the CJEU concluded the matter to be relevant to the Swedish court’s decision so long as whatever issued penalties are “effective, proportionate, and dissuasive” according to its national standards.

==== Case C-27/22, Volkswagen Group Italia S.p.A., Volkswagen Aktiengesellschaft v. Associazione Cittadinanza Attiva Onlus (2023) ====
In Volkswagen Group Italia and Volkswagen Aktiengesellschaft, the CJEU handled whether an administrative fine by a national consumer protection authority against a company could become criminal in nature when addressing unfair commercial practices and consumer protection under Directive 2005/29/EC. In 2016, the Italian Competition Markets Authority (AGCM) fined both Volkswagen Group Italia (VWGI) and Volkswagen Aktiengesellschaft (VWAG) 5 million euros on the basis of unfair commercial practices in the automobile industry by distorting their pollutant emissions levels on their vehicles’ interfaces. While VWGI and VWAG were still involved in proceedings with the Italian Regional Administrative Court, the Public Prosecutor’s Office of Braunschweig in Germany imposed a fine of 1 billion euros through a final decision on the same grounds of the misinformation related to Volkswagen’s pollutant emissions levels. Due to the final decision characteristic of the decision at Braunschweig, VWAG surrendered its right to bring action against the decision as it had appealed in Italy, leaving Volkswagen with its 1 billion euro fine alongside a pending case dealing with a similar case matter. Once the decision was reached in 2019, VWGI and VWAG contended that their rights according to non bis in idem under Article 50 of the Charter and Article of the 54 CISA had been violated. By contending the matter to the CJEU, VWGI and VWAG posited that the administrative fines reached a criminal level, therefore hindering their protections from punishment twice.

In response, the Court agreed with the applicants that their rights pertaining to non bis in idem under Article 50 were breached. The Court’s premise laid on the idea that the imposed administrative fine constituted a criminal penalty due to its punitive purpose and higher degree of severity. The nature of the penalty was tested through the Engel criteria, which it passed. As for the former prong related to its punitive purpose, the CJEU held that the cited violation of Article 27(9) by the AGCM had a purpose not just to punish unlawful conduct related to competition practices but to deprive an entity from continuing to pursue its unfair commercial advantage. As for the latter prong related to the degree of severity, the CJEU noted that bearing in mind the maximum potential penalty contingent on relevant provisions, the 5 million euro fine constituted a criminal punishment. While in technical terms, the penalties were under administrative code, they were inherently criminal and cited twice, demonstrating the utility of the Engel criteria in non bis in idem procedure through the CJEU.

=== The ‘Bis’ (Duplication of Proceedings) Requirement ===
==== Cases C-187/01 and C-385/01, Gözütok and Brügge (2003) ====
In Gözütok and Brügge, the CJEU dealt with legality of the preclusion of further prosecution given the discontinuation of criminal proceedings in another Schengen Agreement member state under Article 54 of CISA. In Gözütok, the applicant was in possession of illicit hashish products, which the Dutch government cited to pursue criminal proceedings against him. These conditions were also drawn to the attention of German authorities through a German bank alerting them of unusually large sums of money. This led to the discovery of narcotic sales, which the German Regional Court in Aachen tried and sentenced him for. Gözütok appealed the decision against the Aachen court, which they terminated under Article 54 of CISA. However, under the termination, questions remained over whether the Dutch “transactie” under Dutch law served as a final disposition that barred the German courts from taking further action. Similarly, under Brügge, the applicant, who was a German national, was charged by Belgian prosecuting officials for intentionally assaulting and wounding a Belgian national, Leliaert. While proceedings were ongoing in a Belgian criminal court, Brügge had already reached a conclusion in a settlement with the German judicial authority, thus raising questions over a duplication of proceedings across Schengen Agreement member states.

The Court ultimately ruled that the non bis in idem rights under Article 54 of CISA were violated in Gözütok and Brügge. The CJEU confirmed the applicability of the non bis in idem principle such that once the applicant fulfills outlined obligations or negotiations with the public prosecutors, the discontinuation of proceedings constitutes a procedure that cannot be tried again in another member state. The CJEU underscored the initial legal ability of the public prosecutor to discontinue prosecution as an option under the administration of criminal justice. Nevertheless, settlement acts regarding penalties for unlawful conduct still constitute a legal exercise by the state to punish an individual. If the applicant complies with obligations by the public prosecutor, which Gözütok and Brügge did, an additional penalty or prosecution from another Schengen member state is redundant and violates the protections against a duplication of trial under Article 54. Because of the devolvement of power into national courts under CISA, harmonization of criminal procedures (e.g., Dutch “transactie”) is not required. That said, the Court clarified that mutual trust and compliance amongst the member states was necessary to ensure the effet utile (effective application) of Article 54 and protect individuals’ enshrined rights under Article 54 of CISA. Thus, Gözütok and Brügge served as principal cases to bolster the “bis” requirement of non bis in idem by establishing the preclusion of further prosecution at the national level within the EU.

==== Case C-486/14, Kossowski (2016) ====
In Kossowski, the CJEU was concerned with whether a decision by a public prosecutor to terminate criminal proceedings and close an investigation against a defendant, without any penalty and a condition that it may be reopened upon the emergence of new essential evidence, may be considered a “final decision.” If so, questions were raised if such a decision could prevent further prosecution in another member state. Accordingly, the public prosecutors’ office of Hamburg accused Kossowski of the criminal offense of extortion with aggravating factors. Kossowski fled in a vehicle belonging to the victim during his proceedings in Germany when he was subsequently stopped, arrested, and sentenced in Poland. The Polish court opened the same charges against him according to its national law but closed the case in the absence of sufficient evidence and considered the termination as final, leading to the potential continuation of the case in Germany. Despite still being wanted in Germany, the Hamburg court refused to open proceedings out of concern of doubling prosecution in violation of Article 54 of CISA. Thus, the CJEU heard an appeal brought forth by the Hamburg Public Prosecutor’s Office contending that the German law was still applicable given the substantial evidence of its proceeding, finding the Polish decision of termination to be overreaching in barring the respective German trial.

In its decision, the Court ruled that non bis in idem was not violated in Kossowski since it realized that the Polish termination was not considered “final” to invoke Article 54. Thus, reopening proceedings in Germany would not constitute a duplication of proceedings. A fundamental facet of Article 54 is the requirement of a decision made “after a determination has been made as to the merits of the case.” In such, the requirement is not fulfilled when a prosecuting authority failed to undertake a thorough investigation, refused to proceed based on the defendant’s ability to give a statement, or failed to provide substantial hearsay witness testimony. Accordingly, this applies in Kossowski whereby the Polish courts failed to gather substantial evidence to fully administer proceedings and potential penalties to the defendant. Kossowski therefore confirmed two key tenets of the bis principle: (1) a final decision in proceedings from one member state must bar further prosecution and penalty in another member state and (2) a decision must be delivered “after a determination has been made as to the merits of the case.”

=== The ‘Idem’ (The Same Offense) Requirement ===
==== Case C-436/04, Van Esbroeck (2006) ====
In Van Esbroeck, the CJEU assessed the relevant criterion for the application of the “same acts or offense” criteria of non bis in idem in the frame of material acts. The defendant, a Belgian national, was tried and sentenced in Norway for importing illicit narcotics. Van Esbroeck was conditionally released and escorted back to Belgian whereupon his return he was tried and convicted for exporting the aforementioned illicit narcotics. An appeal was then brought before the Belgian Court of Cassation and the preceding court on the grounds that Van Esbroeck’s non bis in idem rights were violated under Article 54 of CISA.

In response, the CJEU ruled that non bis in idem was violated given the existence of “inextricably linked” facts. Regardless of the legal classification, affirming the criminal nature of the acts, the punishable acts of importation in Norway and exportation in Belgium of the same narcotic drugs constitutes “the same acts,” which are protected under non bis in idem. While the CJEU reiterated that definitive assessment would ultimately be under the jurisdiction of the respective national courts, the same offense in Van Esbroeck prevented his re-trial and second punishment.

=== The Schengen Nature Condition ===
==== Case C-435/22 PPU, Generalstaatsanwaltschaft München (2023) ====
In Generalstaatsanwaltschaft München, the CJEU addressed whether the non bis in idem principle outlined in Article 54 of CISA with Article 50 of the Charter could preclude the extradition of a third-country national from a Member State to another third country. The defendant, whose alias is HF, was a Serbian national who was put into custody in Germany following a red notice issued by Interpol at the request of American authorities. Upon arrest, HF mentioned that he had been imprisoned in Slovenia for the offense of “attacking information systems” and fully served his sentence. Thus, upon calls for extradition, the Higher Regional Court of Munich had doubts towards the application of non bis in idem under the relevant law to prevent the extradition. Given the bilateral extradition treaty between the U.S. and Germany, non bis in idem could be potentially ruled out given its exclusion of considerations of judgments from other Member States, that being Slovenia in this case.

The CJEU ruled that non bis in idem should be upheld, thereby precluding the extradition to the U.S. in light of Article 54 of CISA and Article 50 of the Charter. Since a final judgment was administered in Slovenia, an additional penalty that could be enforced could no longer be applicable since a decision had already been made in the national system of an EU member state. Moreover, the CJEU affirmed that a bilateral extradition treaty could not trump or annul the provisions of Article 54 of CISA and Article 50 of the Charter. However, the Court clarified that it would not have the capacity to bar extradition bilaterally assuming offense were committed outside of the subject matter or relevant time period of prosecution, upholding the “sufficiently close connection” tenet proscribed through the ECtHR. Accordingly, Generalstaatsanwaltschaft München affirmed the supremacy of the Schengen Area and the EU over bilateral treaties in matters related to fundamental rights under extradition processes and double jeopardy.

== See also ==
- Extradition
- List of legal Latin terms
