= Magdalena Fransson =

Swedish politician

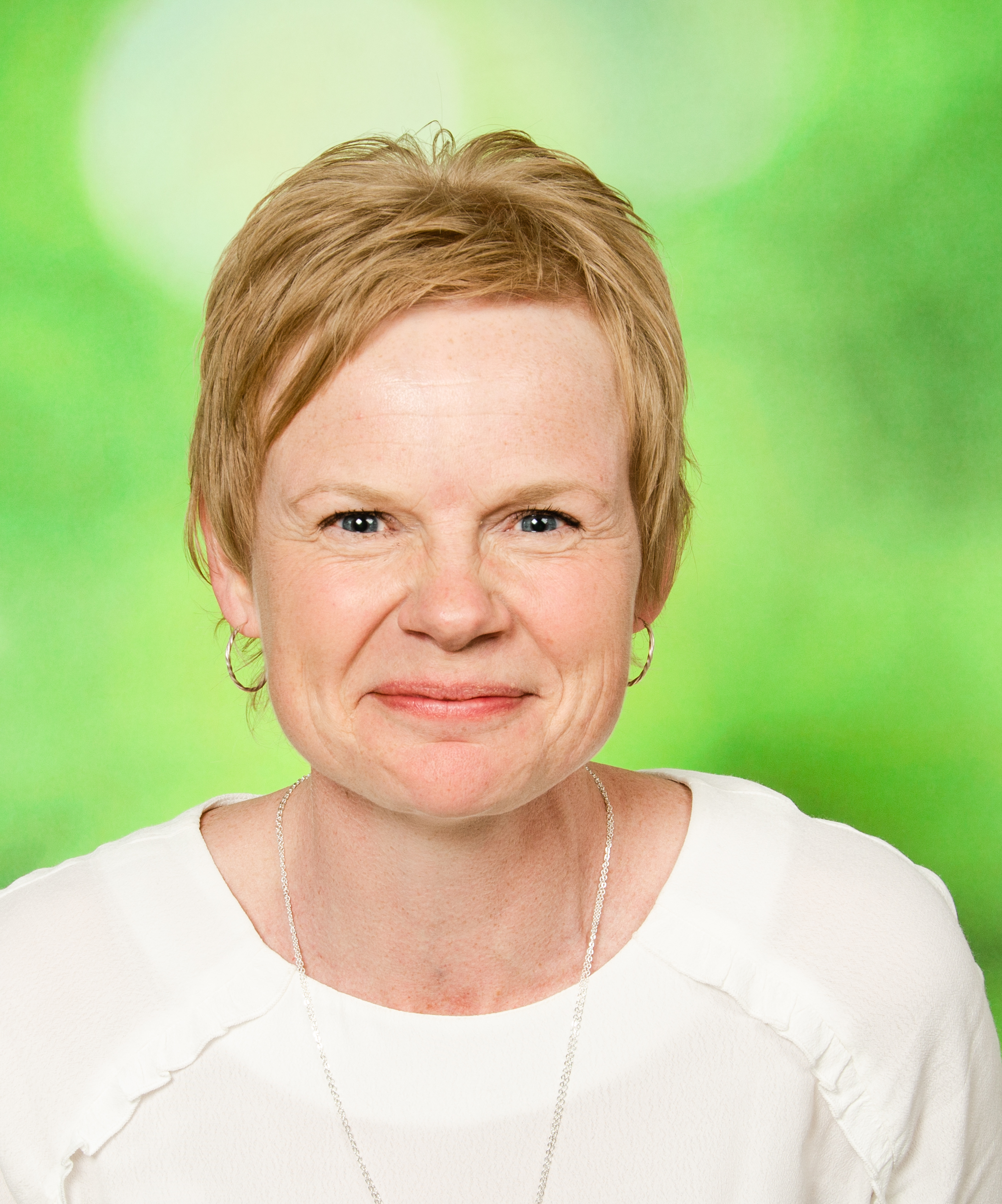
Magdalena Fransson

Magdalena Fransson (born 1971) is a Swedish politician. She is a member of the Centre Party and was chairman of Centre Party Youth from 1996 to 1999.
