= Åklagaren v Fransson =

Åkerberg Fransson
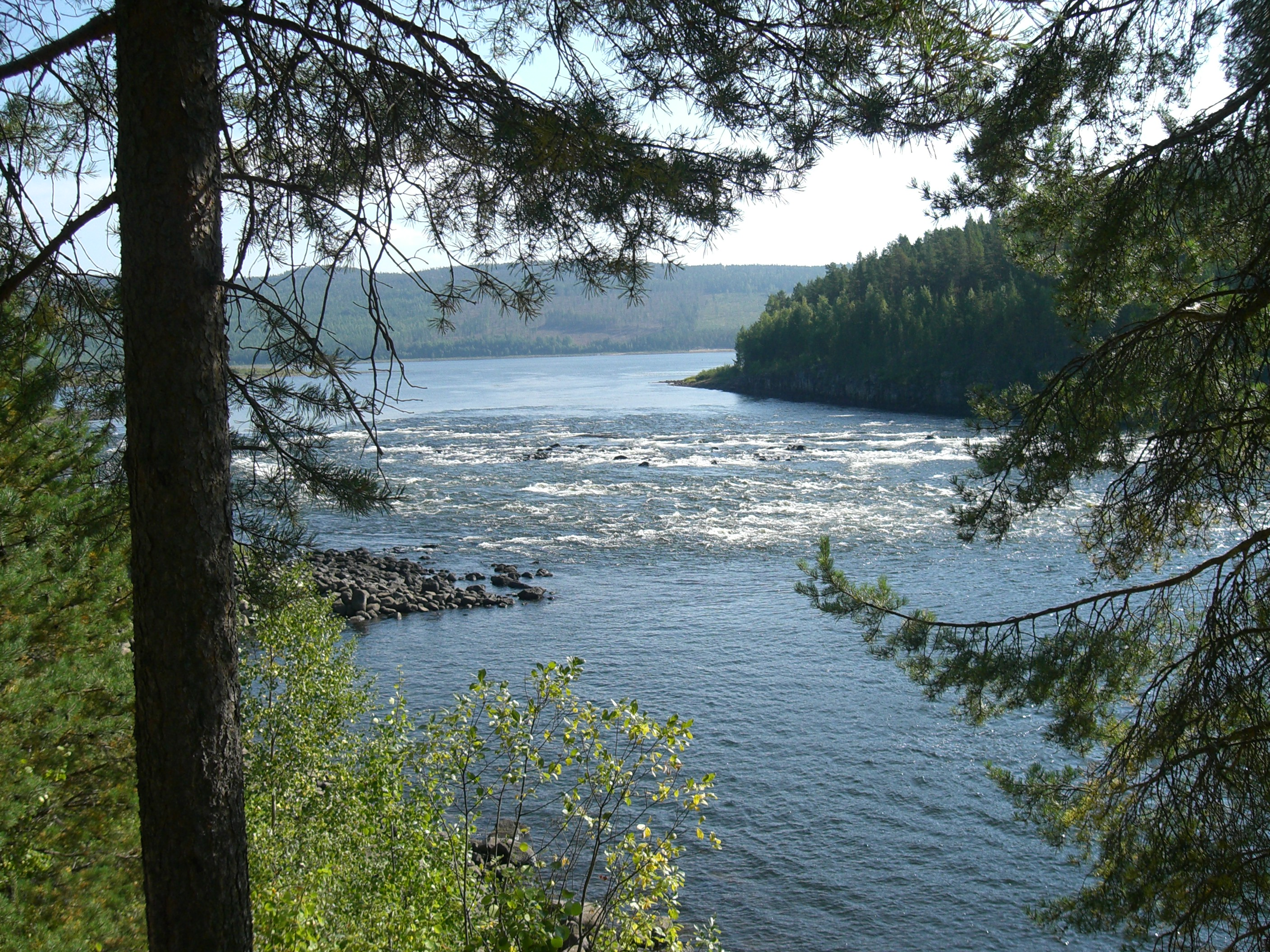
- Court: European Court of Justice
- Citation: (2013) C-617/10

Keywords
- Human rights

Åkerberg Fransson (2013) C-617/10 is a decision of the Court of Justice of the European Union (CJEU) concerning the application of the Charter of Fundamental Rights of the European Union. The case addressed whether EU member states are bound by the Charter when enforcing national laws that implement EU obligations, particularly in the context of tax penalties and criminal proceedings.

The Court ruled that the Charter does apply when national measures fall within the scope of EU law, and that doing so does not violate the principle of national legal autonomy. The case is notable for clarifying when the Charter’s protections—such as the right not to be tried or punished twice for the same offence (ne bis in idem)—apply in national legal systems.

== Facts ==
Mr Hans Åkerberg Fransson claimed he should not have criminal proceedings brought against him after he had already gotten tax fines. The Åklagare (Public Prosecutor's Office) prosecuted Mr Fransson for fraudulently misstating his liabilities for income and Value Added Tax, failing to declare employers' contributions in his work as a fisherman on the Kalix River. Directive 2006/112/EC harmonised principles of those taxes. He got fines for 2004 and 2005 in 2007. The criminal prosecutions began. CFREU article 50 says that nobody shall be tried or punished twice for a criminal conviction (ne bis in idem, not the same thing twice). ECHR Protocol 7, article 4 contains the same.

== Judgment ==
The Court of Justice, Grand Chamber, held that a tax penalty, for value added tax, if not criminal in nature can be imposed. EU law does not govern relations of member states to the ECHR. However, it precludes a national law disapplying provisions contrary to the CFREU, as it withholds a power to assess fully whether a provision is compatible with the Charter.

18 That article of the Charter thus confirms the Court's case-law relating to the extent to which actions of the Member States must comply with the requirements flowing from the fundamental rights guaranteed in the legal order of the European Union.

19 The Court's settled case-law indeed states, in essence, that the fundamental rights guaranteed in the legal order of the European Union are applicable in all situations governed by European Union law, but not outside such situations. In this respect the Court has already observed that it has no power to examine the compatibility with the Charter of national legislation lying outside the scope of European Union law. On the other hand, if such legislation falls within the scope of European Union law, the Court, when requested to give a preliminary ruling, must provide all the guidance as to interpretation needed in order for the national court to determine whether that legislation is compatible with the fundamental rights the observance of which the Court ensures (see inter alia, to this effect, Case C‑260/89 ERT [1991] I‑2925, paragraph 42; Case C‑299/95 Kremzow [1997] ECR I‑2629, paragraph 15; Case C‑309/96 Annibaldi [2007] ECR I‑7493, paragraph 13; Case C‑94/00 Roquette Frères [2002] ECR I‑9011, paragraph 25; Case C‑349/07 Sopropé [2008] ECR I‑10369, paragraph 34; Case C‑256/11 Dereci and Others [2011] ECR I‑11315, paragraph 72; and Case C‑27/11 Vinkov [2012] ECR, paragraph 58).

20 That definition of the field of application of the fundamental rights of the European Union is borne out by the explanations relating to Article 51 of the Charter, which, in accordance with the third subparagraph of Article 6(1) TEU and Article 52(7) of the Charter, have to be taken into consideration for the purpose of interpreting it (see, to this effect, Case C‑279/09 DEB [2010] ECR I‑13849, paragraph 32). According to those explanations, 'the requirement to respect fundamental rights defined in the context of the Union is only binding on the Member States when they act in the scope of Union law'.

21 Since the fundamental rights guaranteed by the Charter must therefore be complied with where national legislation falls within the scope of European Union law, situations cannot exist which are covered in that way by European Union law without those fundamental rights being applicable. The applicability of European Union law entails applicability of the fundamental rights guaranteed by the Charter.

22 Where, on the other hand, a legal situation does not come within the scope of European Union law, the Court does not have jurisdiction to rule on it and any provisions of the Charter relied upon cannot, of themselves, form the basis for such jurisdiction (see, to this effect, the order in Case C‑466/11 Currà and Others [2012] ECR, paragraph 26).

23 These considerations correspond to those underlying Article 6(1) TEU, according to which the provisions of the Charter are not to extend in any way the competences of the European Union as defined in the Treaties. Likewise, the Charter, pursuant to Article 51(2) thereof, does not extend the field of application of European Union law beyond the powers of the European Union or establish any new power or task for the European Union, or modify powers and tasks as defined in the Treaties (see Dereci and Others, paragraph 71).

24 in the case in point, it is to be noted at the outset that the tax penalties and criminal proceedings to which Mr Åkerberg Fransson has been or is subject are connected in part to breaches of his obligations to declare VAT.

25 in relation to VAT, it follows, first, from Articles 2, 250(1) and 273 of Council Directive 2006/112/EC of 28 November 2006 on the common system of value added tax (OJ 2006 L 347, p. 1), which reproduce inter alia the provisions of Article 2 of the Sixth Directive and of Article 22(4) and (8) of that directive in the version resulting from Article 28h thereof, and second, from Article 4(3) TEU that every Member State is under an obligation to take all legislative and administrative measures appropriate for ensuring collection of all the VAT due on its territory and for preventing evasion (see Case C‑132/06 Commission v Italy [2008] ECR I‑5457, paragraphs 37 and 46).

== See also ==
- European Union law
